= 1928–29 Eintracht Frankfurt season =

Eintracht Frankfurt
1928–29 season
- Chairman: Egon Graf von Beroldingen
- Manager: Paul Oßwald
- Bezirksliga Main-Hessen (Main division): 1st / Champions
- South German Championship round: 4th
- Domestic cup competition: Not established yet
- Top goalscorer: League: Karl Ehmer (21); All: Karl Ehmer (30)
- Highest home attendance: 30,000 2 December 1928 v FSV Frankfurt (league)
- Lowest home attendance: 1,500 16 September 1928 v SpVgg 60/94 Hanau (league)

The 1928–29 Eintracht Frankfurt season was the 29th season in the club's football history.

In 1928–29 the club played in the Bezirksliga Main-Hessen (Main division), the top tier of German football. It was the club's 2nd season in the Bezirksliga Main-Hessen (Main division).

The season ended up with Eintracht winning the Bezirksliga Main-Hessen (Main division). In the South German Championship round finished as 4th, not qualifying for the German Championship knockout stage.

== Matches ==
=== Legend ===
Win Draw Loss Postponed

=== Friendlies ===
5 August 1928	Eintracht Frankfurt (Germany)	6–3	(Germany) Altona 93	Frankfurt, Germany
	Schaller 6'; Döpfer 20'; Goldammer 25'; Ehmer 63' 70'	Report	Nommensen 32'; Endruleit 22'	Stadium: Riederwaldstadion; Referee: Höhn

12 August 1928	Eintracht Frankfurt (Germany)	3–4	(Germany) SpVgg Sülz 07	Frankfurt, Germany
	Ehmer 17'; Schaller 32'; Döpfer 63'	Report	Zarges 61'; Gausepohl 65'; 84'; Swatosch 85'	Stadium: Waldstadion; Attendance: 15,000; Referee: Hasemeier

30 December 1928	Eintracht Frankfurt (Germany)	0–2	(Germany) SpVgg Fürth	Frankfurt, Germany
		Report	Frank; Franz	Stadium: Riederwaldstadion; Referee: Rotauge

31 March 1929	Eintracht Frankfurt (Germany)	3–0	(Germany) Essener SC Preußen	Frankfurt, Germany
	Mantel	Report		Stadium: Riederwaldstadion; Referee: Fink

1 April 1929	Eintracht Frankfurt (Germany)	0–2	(Germany) Schwaben Augsburg	Frankfurt, Germany
		Report	Wittmann (pen.)	Stadium: Riederwaldstadion; Referee: Kellerer

21 April 1929	Eintracht Frankfurt (Germany)	5–1	(Germany) Mainz 05	Germany
	Dietrich; Krenz; Schaller	Report	Schneider	Referee: Hannewald

18 May 1929	SC Brühl / FC St. Gallen XI (Switzerland)	2–4	(Germany) Eintracht Frankfurt	St. Gallen, Switzerland
	Goal	Report	Krenz; Kron; Ehmer

20 May 1929	Young Fellows Zürich (Switzerland)	1–7	(Germany) Eintracht Frankfurt	Zurich, Switzerland
	Bucco	Report	Dietrich; Ehmer; Kron; Kellerhoff	Attendance: 14,000

25 May 1929	Eintracht Frankfurt (Germany)	2–1	(Germany) Kickers Offenbach	Frankfurt, Germany
	Kellerhoff; Dietrich	Report	(o.g.)	Stadium: Riederwaldstadion

9 June 1929	Eintracht Frankfurt (Germany)	0–1	(Germany) SpVgg Fürth	Frankfurt, Germany
		Report	Schütz 83' (o.g.)	Stadium: Waldstadion; Attendance: 12,000

16 June 1929	Eintracht Frankfurt (Germany)	5–0	(France) Olympique de Marseille	Frankfurt, Germany
	Schaller 5', 30'; Kron 24'; Kellerhoff 44'; Ehmer	Report		Stadium: Riederwaldstadion; Attendance: 6,000; Referee: Rettelbach

23 June 1929	Eintracht Frankfurt (Germany)	1–0	(Germany) 1. FC Nürnberg	Frankfurt, Germany
	Ehmer	Report		Referee: Uhrig

29 June 1929	Eintracht Frankfurt (Germany)	1–1	(Egypt) Arsenal Cairo	Germany
	Dietrich 55'	Report	Rihan 80'	Attendance: 3,000; Referee: Weingärtner

=== Bezirksliga Main-Hessen (Main division) ===
==== League fixtures and results ====
19 August 1928 1	Eintracht Frankfurt	7–1	Hanauer FC 93	Frankfurt, Germany
	Döpfer; Kissinger; Goldammer; Ehmer	Report	Philippi	Stadium: Riederwaldstadion; Attendance: 5,000; Referee: Schmitt

26 August 1928 2	Union Niederrad	4–2	Eintracht Frankfurt	Frankfurt, Germany
	Stork; Kolter; Lindner	Report	Ehmer; Schaller	Stadium: Unionplatz; Attendance: 3,000; Referee: Schäfer

1 September 1928 3	Eintracht Frankfurt	3–1	SpVgg Fechenheim	Frankfurt, Germany
	Schaller; Ehmer; Kissinger	Report	Pinther	Attendance: 3,500; Referee: Dölcker

9 September 1928 4	Germania Bieber	1–1	Eintracht Frankfurt	Bieber, Germany
	Huber	Report	Schaller	Attendance: 4,000; Referee: Fritz

16 September 1928 5	Eintracht Frankfurt	5–1	SpVgg 60/94 Hanau	Germany
	Ehmer 3' (pen.) 49'; Kissinger	Report	Sachs 62' (pen.)	Attendance: 1,500; Referee: Bachmann

23 September 1928 6	FSV Frankfurt	2–5	Eintracht Frankfurt	Frankfurt, Germany
	Brück 3'; (o.g.)	Report	Kissinger; Ehmer; Kellerhoff	Stadium: Waldstadion; Attendance: 25,000; Referee: Maul

30 September 1928 7	Eintracht Frankfurt	3–1	Kickers Offenbach	Germany
	Kissinger; Döpfer; Ehmer	Report	Goal	Attendance: 4,000; Referee: Daxner

7 October 1928 8	Rot-Weiss Frankfurt	1–2	Eintracht Frankfurt	Frankfurt, Germany
	Meier	Report	Ehmer	Stadium: Platz an der Festhalle; Attendance: 20,000; Referee: Müller

21 October 1928 9	Eintracht Frankfurt	7–1	Viktoria Aschaffenburg	Frankfurt, Germany
	Dietrich; Döpfer; Ehmer; Kellerhoff	Report	Herrmann	Stadium: Riederwaldstadion; Attendance: 2,500; Referee: Knecht

28 October 1928 Since Eintracht's player Schütz was capped for an international match with Germany the league match was played as a friendly and rescheduled for 26 December 1928.	Hanauer FC 93	1–0	Eintracht Frankfurt	Hanau, Germany
	Goal	Report

4 November 1928 11	Eintracht Frankfurt	3–2	Union Niederrad	Frankfurt, Germany
	Schaller; Ehmer	Report	Goal	Stadium: Riederwaldstadion; Attendance: 2,500; Referee: List

11 November 1928 12	SpVgg Fechenheim	1–1	Eintracht Frankfurt	Frankfurt, Germany
	Heck (red card); Kunzig (red card); Pinther	Report	Kübert (red card); Ehmer	Attendance: 3,500; Referee: Sackenreuther

18 November 1928 13	Eintracht Frankfurt	3–1	Germania Bieber	Germany
	Döpfer	Report	Huber	Attendance: 4,000; Referee: Walter

25 November 1928 14	SpVgg 60/94 Hanau	0–4	Eintracht Frankfurt	Germany
		Report	Döpfer; Ehmer; Kellerhoff; Schaller	Attendance: 300; Referee: Becker

2 December 1928 15	Eintracht Frankfurt	2–4	FSV Frankfurt	Frankfurt, Germany
	Döpfer; Schaller 84'	Report	Pache; Böttner; Armbruster 77'	Stadium: Waldstadion; Attendance: 30,000; Referee: Fritz

9 December 1928 16	Kickers Offenbach	1–1	Eintracht Frankfurt	Bieber, Germany
	Benz	Report	Ehmer 35'	Stadium: Stadion am Bieberer Berg; Attendance: 6,000; Referee: Müller

16 December 1928 17	Eintracht Frankfurt	3–1	Rot-Weiss Frankfurt	Frankfurt, Germany
	Ehmer 20'	Report	Funk 22'	Stadium: Riederwaldstadion; Attendance: 4,000; Referee: Maul

23 December 1928 18	Viktoria Aschaffenburg	2–3	Eintracht Frankfurt	Aschaffenburg, Germany
	Brehm 19'; Kolb 36'	Report	Ehmer 62' (pen.); Goldammer 70'; Döpfer 87'	Attendance: 2,500; Referee: Boerres

26 December 1928 10	Hanauer FC 93	4–1	Eintracht Frankfurt	Hanau, Germany
	Goal	Report	Ehmer	Stadium: Stadion an der Aschaffenburger Straße; Attendance: 1,500

==== League table ====
Pos	Team	Pld	W	D	L	GF	GA	GD	Pts	Promotion, qualification or relegation
1	Eintracht Frankfurt	18	12	3	3	56	29	+27	27	Qualification to Qualifier to the championship
2	FSV Frankfurt	18	12	1	5	72	25	+47	25	
3	Union Niederrad	18	12	1	5	47	26	+21	25	
4	Kickers Offenbach	18	9	5	4	34	30	+4	23	
5	Hanauer FC 93	18	10	2	6	42	32	+10	22	
6	Germania Bieber	18	8	3	7	37	27	+10	19	
7	Rot-Weiss Frankfurt	18	9	1	8	34	26	+8	19	
8	SpVgg Fechenheim	18	4	2	12	28	63	−35	10	Relegation to the second tier
9	Viktoria Aschaffenburg	18	2	1	15	19	62	−43	5	Relegation to the second tier
10	SpVgg 60/94 Hanau	18	2	1	15	18	67	−49	5	Relegation to the second tier

Source: RSSSF.com
Rules for classification: 1) Points

==== Results summary ====
Overall								Home						Away					
Pld	W	D	L	GF	GA	GD	Pts	W	D	L	GF	GA	GD	W	D	L	GF	GA	GD
18	12	3	3	56	29	+27	27	8	0	1	36	13	+23	4	3	2	20	16	+4

Source: Bundesliga

==== Results by round ====
Round	1	2	3	4	5	6	7	8	9	10	11	12	13	14	15	16	17	18
Ground	H	A	H	A	H	A	H	A	H	A	H	A	H	A	H	A	H	A
Result	W	L	W	D	W	W	W	W	W	L	W	D	W	W	L	D	W	W
Position	2	3	4	2	2	2	2	1	1	1	1	1	1	1	1	1	1	1

A = Away; H = Home; W = Win; D = Draw; L = Loss

=== South German championship round ===
==== League fixtures and results ====
6 January 1929 1	Eintracht Frankfurt	4–0	Germania Brötzingen	Frankfurt, Germany
	Dietrich; Ehmer; Stamm	Report		Stadium: Riederwaldstadion; Attendance: 15,000; Referee: Sehlmacher

20 January 1929 2	Eintracht Frankfurt	1–2	1. FC Nürnberg	Frankfurt, Germany
	Schaller	Report	Weiß; Wieder	Stadium: Waldstadion; Attendance: 25,000; Referee: Fritz

27 January 1929 3	Bayern Munich	3–1	Eintracht Frankfurt	Munich, Germany
	Haringer; Schmidt	Report	Dietrich	Stadium: Stadion an der Grünwalder Straße; Attendance: 12,000; Referee: Schneider

3 March 1929 4	Germania Brötzingen	2–2	Eintracht Frankfurt	Pforzheim, Germany
	Burkhardt (pen.); Dietz	Report	Stamm; Schaller	Attendance: 6,000; Referee: Becker

10 March 1929 5	Eintracht Frankfurt	1–5	Bayern Munich	Frankfurt, Germany
	Ehmer 5'	Report	Welker 20'; Haringer; Schmid; Pöttinger	Stadium: Waldstadion; Attendance: 15,000; Referee: Keller

17 March 1929 6	1. FC Nürnberg	2–0	Eintracht Frankfurt	Nuremberg, Germany
	Hornauer 42'; Mantel 44' (o.g.)	Report		Stadium: Zabo; Attendance: 15,000; Referee: Rettelbach

24 March 1929 7	Wormatia Worms	3–1	Eintracht Frankfurt	Worms, Germany
	Winkler 28'; Deibert 47'; Philipp 77'	Report	Pfeiffer 44'	Stadium: Wormatia-Stadion; Attendance: 4,000; Referee: Bohn

7 April 1929 8	Eintracht Frankfurt	2–4	VfL Neckarau	Germany
	Ehmer; Dietrich	Report	Zeilfelder 15'; Striehl	Attendance: 5,000; Referee: Schmitt

14 April 1929 9	Borussia Neunkirchen	0–1	Eintracht Frankfurt	Germany
		Report	Schaller	Attendance: 4,000; Referee: Müller

28 April 1929 10	Karlsruher FV	0–3	Eintracht Frankfurt	Karlsruhe, Germany
		Report	Schaller; Krenz; Dietrich	Stadium: KFV-Platz; Attendance: 4,500; Referee: Sackenreuther

5 May 1929 11	Eintracht Frankfurt	3–2	Karlsruher FV	Frankfurt, Germany
	Schaller; Ehmer; Zimmermann (o.g.)	Report	Quasten; Poretti	Stadium: Waldstadion; Attendance: 20,000; Referee: Freiländer

9 May 1929 12	VfL Neckarau	1–2	Eintracht Frankfurt	Mannheim, Germany
	Striehl 37'	Report	Schaller	Attendance: 4,000; Referee: Dölker

12 May 1929 13	Eintracht Frankfurt	3–0	Borussia Neunkirchen	Frankfurt, Germany
	Ehmer; Schaller; Kellerhoff	Report		Stadium: Riederwaldstadion; Attendance: 12,000; Referee: Waltenberger

1 June 1929 14	Eintracht Frankfurt	3–2	Wormatia Worms	Germany
	Ehmer (pen.)(.); Schaller	Report	Dietz; (pen.)	Attendance: 3,000; Referee: Krotz

==== League table ====
Pos	Team	Pld	W	D	L	GF	GA	GD	Pts	Promotion, qualification or relegation
1	1. FC Nürnberg	14	12	1	1	52	7	+45	25	Qualification to Qualifier to the championship
2	Bayern Munich	14	9	2	3	47	28	+19	20	Qualification to Qualifier to the championship
3	VfL Neckarau	14	5	5	4	30	28	+2	15	
4	Eintracht Frankfurt	14	7	1	6	27	26	+1	15	
5	Karlsruher FV	14	3	7	4	24	25	−1	13	
6	Germania Brötzingen	14	3	5	6	17	29	−12	11	
7	Wormatia Worms	14	3	4	7	18	37	−19	10	
8	Borussia Neunkirchen	14	1	1	12	10	45	−35	3	

Source: RSSSF.com
Rules for classification: 1) Points

==== Results summary ====
Overall								Home						Away					
Pld	W	D	L	GF	GA	GD	Pts	W	D	L	GF	GA	GD	W	D	L	GF	GA	GD
14	7	1	6	27	26	+1	15	4	0	3	17	15	+2	3	1	3	10	11	−1

Source: Bundesliga

==== Results by round ====
Round	1	2	3	4	5	6	7	8	9	10	11	12	13	14
Ground	H	H	A	A	H	A	A	H	A	A	H	A	H	H
Result	W	L	L	D	L	L	L	L	W	W	W	W	W	W
Position	1	6	6	6	6	6	6	6	6	6	6	5	4	4

A = Away; H = Home; W = Win; D = Draw; L = Loss

== Squad ==
=== Squad and statistics ===
No.	Pos	Nat	Player	Total		Bezirksliga		South German Championship round	
No.	Pos	Nat	Player	Apps	Goals	Apps	Goals	Apps	Goals
	GK	(Germany) GER	Hermann Judisch	21	0	13	0	8	0
	GK	(Germany) GER	Willy Trump	11	0	5	0	6	0
	DF	(Germany) GER	Rudi Kirchheim	11	0	4	0	7	0
	DF	(Germany) GER	Fritz Mauruschat (Note: Originally, the family name was Maurischat. By mistake a registrar in Berlin registered the name as "Mauruschat". When marrying in Frankfurt it would have taken too much time to correct the typing error and therefore Fritz formally kept the name Mauruschat)	15	0	13	0	2	0
	DF	(Germany) GER	Willi Pfeiffer	7	1	0	0	7	1
	DF	(Germany) GER	Franz Schütz	30	0	17	0	13	0
	DF	(Germany) GER	Heinrich Vesper	2	0	2	0	0	0
	MF	(Germany) GER	Hans Bechtold	10	0	8	0	2	0
	MF	(Germany) GER	Bruno Goldammer	24	2	12	2	12	0
	MF		Willi Klar	1	0	1	0	0	0
	MF	(Germany) GER	Fritz Kübert	26	0	12	0	14	0
	MF	(Germany) GER	Hugo Mantel	28	0	15	0	13	0
	FW	(Switzerland) SUI	Walter Dietrich	26	7	14	3	12	4
	FW	(Germany) GER	Karl Döpfer	19	12	15	12	4	0
	FW	(Germany) GER	Karl Ehmer	32	30	18	21	14	9
	FW	(Germany) GER	Albert Höhl	4	0	3	0	1	0
	FW	(Germany) GER	Bernhard Kellerhoff	32	3	18	3	14	0
	FW	(Germany) GER	H Kissinger	13	9	11	9	2	0
	FW		Krenz	6	1	0	0	6	1
	FW	(Germany) GER	Fritz Schaller	29	15	17	6	12	9
	FW	(Germany) GER	Heinrich Stamm	5	2	0	0	5	2

=== Transfers ===
In:

No.	Pos.	Nation	Player
—	FW	GER	Albert Höhl (from Eintracht Frankfurt academy)
—	MF	GER	Willi Klar (from unknown)
—	FW	GER	Krenz (from unknown)
—	MF	GER	Hugo Mantel (from Dresdner SC)
—	MF	GER	Heinrich Vesper (from VfL Germania 1894)

Out:

No.	Pos.	Nation	Player
—	MF		Karl Biehler (to unknown)
—	DF		Friedel Egly (to unknown)
—	FW		Kaufmann (to unknown)
—	MF		James Müller (to unknown)
—	FW	GER	Georg Stroh (to unknown)

== See also ==
- 1929 German football championship

== Sources ==
- Matheja, Ulrich (2011). Unsere Eintracht - Eintracht Frankfurt - Die Chronik. Die Werkstatt. ISBN 978-3-89533-750-5.
