= 1927–28 Eintracht Frankfurt season =

Eintracht Frankfurt
1927–28 season
- Chairman: Egon Graf von Beroldingen
- Manager: Walter Dietrich / Friedel Egly (player-managers until September 1927); Gustav Wieser (signed October 1927)
- Bezirksliga Main-Hessen (Main division): 1st / Champions
- South German Championship round: 2nd / Runners-Up
- German Championship knockout stage: Round of 16
- Domestic cup competition: Not established yet
- Top goalscorer: League: Karl Ehmer (34); All: Karl Ehmer (40)
- Highest home attendance: 25,000 2 October 1927 v FSV Frankfurt (league)
- Lowest home attendance: 2,000 11 December 1927 v VfR Offenbach (league)

The 1927–28 Eintracht Frankfurt season was the 28th season in the club's football history.

In 1927–28 the club played in the Bezirksliga Main-Hessen, the top tier of German football. It was the club's 1st season in the Bezirksliga Main-Hessen. The league was founded with the clubs of the north-eastern part of the Bezirksliga Rheinhessen-Saar merging with those of the Bezirksliga Main (Main division).

The season ended up with Eintracht winning the Bezirksliga Main-Hessen (Main division). In the South German Championship round finished as runners-up but were eliminated in the round of 16 of the German Championship knockout stage.

== Matches ==
=== Legend ===
Win Draw Loss Postponed

=== Friendlies ===
26 December 1927	Eintracht Frankfurt (Germany)	6–0	(Austria) Vienna Cricket and Football-Club	Frankfurt, Germany
	Kellerhoff 30'; Schaller 38'; Dietrich 57'; Döpfer 65' (pen.); Ehmer 70', 80'	Report		Stadium: Waldstadion; Attendance: 3,500; Referee: Uhrig

4 March 1928	Würzburger FV (Germany)	2–2	Eintracht Frankfurt	Würzburg, Germany
	Müller 5'; Stauß	Report	Willner (o.g.); Döpfer	Stadium: Stadion an der Frankfurter Straße; Attendance: 5,000; Referee: Maul

9 April 1928	Eintracht Frankfurt (Germany)	2–2	(Germany) Tennis Borussia Berlin	Germany
	Kellerhoff; Dietrich	Report	Hoffmann; Raue	Attendance: 6,000; Referee: Fritz

9 May 1928	Eintracht Frankfurt (Germany)	1–2	(England) West Ham United	Frankfurt, Germany
	Kissinger	Report	Goal	Stadium: Waldstadion; Attendance: 10,000; Referee: Weingärtner

12 May 1928	ABTS/Komet Bremen (Germany)	1–6	(Germany) Eintracht Frankfurt	Germany
	Goal		Goal

13 May 1928	Altona 93 (Germany)	2–4	(Germany) Eintracht Frankfurt	Altona, Germany
	Warnecke; Jäger	Report	Kissinger; Schaller; Ehmer

17 May 1928	Eintracht Frankfurt (Germany)	4–0	(Italy) Modena FC	Frankfurt, Germany
	Kissinger; Ehmer; Dietrich	Report		Stadium: Waldstadion; Attendance: 4,000; Referee: Haseneier

2 June 1928	VfR Mannheim (Germany)	1–1	(Germany) Eintracht Frankfurt	Mannheim, Germany
	Langenstein	Report	(o.g.)	Referee: Albrecht

3 June 1928	SpVgg Griesheim 02 (Germany)	4–3	(Germany) Eintracht Frankfurt	Germany
	Goal		Goal

10 June 1928	VfL Neu-Isenburg (Germany)	0–5	(Germany) Eintracht Frankfurt	Neu-Isenburg, Germany
		Report	Ehmer	Attendance: 1,000; Referee: Freiländer

24 June 1928	Rot-Weiss Frankfurt (Germany)	1–4	(Germany) Eintracht Frankfurt	Frankfurt, Germany
	Goal	Report	Goal	Stadium: Platz an der Festhalle; Attendance: 4,000; Referee: Herbst

30 June 1928	Hanauer FC 93 (Germany)	2–1	(Germany) Eintracht Frankfurt	Hanau, Germany
	Goal	Report	Ehmer

=== Bezirksliga Main-Hessen (Main division) ===
==== League fixtures and results ====
31 July 1927 1	Eintracht Frankfurt	2–0	Kickers Offenbach	Germany
	Stamm 9'; Schaller 57'	Report		Attendance: 3,000; Referee: Klaiber

7 August 1927 2	SpVgg Fechenheim	1–9	Eintracht Frankfurt	Fechenheim, Germany
	Kuntzig 55'	Report	Ehmer 15', 68', 78'; Schaller 47', 60', 79'; Biehler 56', 77'; Döpfer 86'	Attendance: 2,000; Referee: Blendl

14 August 1927 3	Sport 1860 Hanau	1–6	Eintracht Frankfurt	Hanau, Germany
	Goal	Report	Ehmer; Dietrich; Kellerhoff	Attendance: 1,200

21 August 1927 4	Viktoria Aschaffenburg	0–3	Eintracht Frankfurt	Aschaffenburg, Germany
	Heeg (red card)	Report	Schaller; Ehmer	Attendance: 2,500; Referee: Schmidt

27 August 1927 5	Eintracht Frankfurt	5–1	VfL Germania 1894	Frankfurt, Germany
	Stamm 14'; Döpfer 28'; Ehmer 39', 77'; Goldammer 88'	Report	Meisinger 61'	Attendance: 3,000; Referee: Freiländer

4 September 1927 6	Viktoria 94 Hanau	1–3	Eintracht Frankfurt	Hanau, Germany
	Wilhelm; Schömber (red card); Müller (red card)	Report	Dietrich; Ehmer; Kellerhoff	Attendance: 2,500; Referee: Pulscher

11 September 1927 7	Eintracht Frankfurt	3–0	Hanauer FC 93	Frankfurt, Germany
	Ehmer pen.'	Report	Rothard (red card)	Stadium: Riederwaldstadion; Attendance: 4,000; Referee: Behr

18 September 1927 8	Eintracht Frankfurt	2–1	Rot-Weiss Frankfurt	Frankfurt, Germany
	Ehmer pen.'; Dietrich 83'	Report	Maier	Stadium: Riederwaldstadion; Attendance: 5,000; Referee: Welte

25 September 1927 9	VfR Offenbach	1–3	Eintracht Frankfurt	Offenbach, Germany
	Goal	Report	Schaller; Ehmer; Kaufmann	Attendance: 1,200; Referee: Jünger

2 October 1927 10	Eintracht Frankfurt	1–1	FSV Frankfurt	Frankfurt, Germany
	Ehmer 27'	Report	Strehlke 40'	Stadium: Riederwaldstadion; Attendance: 25,000; Referee: Fritz

9 October 1927 11	Union Niederrad	0–3	Eintracht Frankfurt	Frankfurt, Germany
		Report	Döpfer; Ehmer pen.'	Attendance: 5,000; Referee: Gimper

16 October 1927 12	Kickers Offenbach	1–3	Eintracht Frankfurt	Germany
	pen.'	Report	Kellerhoff 3'; Schaller 43'; Wigidahl (o.g.)	Attendance: 6,000; Referee: Bühler

23 October 1927 13	Eintracht Frankfurt	5–1	Union Niederrad	Frankfurt, Germany
	Dietrich; Döpfer; Kellerhoff; Ehmer	Report	Wissenbach	Stadium: Riederwaldstadion; Attendance: 3,000; Referee: Uhl

30 October 1927 14	FSV Frankfurt	0–2	Eintracht Frankfurt	Frankfurt, Germany
		Report	Ehmer 40'; Schaller	Stadium: Waldstadion; Attendance: 40,000; Referee: Maul

6 November 1927 15	Rot-Weiss Frankfurt	1–0	Eintracht Frankfurt	Frankfurt, Germany
	Jost 58'	Report		Stadium: Platz an der Festhalle; Attendance: 12,000; Referee: Müller

13 November 1927 16	VfL Germania 1894	1–5	Eintracht Frankfurt	Germany
	Vetter	Report	Ehmer 7'; Schaller; Dietrich	Attendance: 2,000

20 November 1927 17	Eintracht Frankfurt	5–0	Viktoria Aschaffenburg	Frankfurt, Germany
	Dietrich; Döpfer; Ehmer	Report		Attendance: 2,500; Referee: Schuan

27 November 1927 18	Eintracht Frankfurt	10–1	SpVgg Fechenheim	Frankfurt, Germany
	Schaller 3'; Dietrich; Ehmer; Kellerhoff; Goldammer; Döpfer	Report	Sohl 10'	Stadium: Riederwaldstadion; Attendance: 4,000; Referee: Dröll

4 December 1927 19	Eintracht Frankfurt	7–0	Viktoria 94 Hanau	Frankfurt, Germany
	Döpfer; Dietrich; Ehmer; Schaller; Kellerhoff	Report		Attendance: 3,000; Referee: Lukassowitz

11 December 1927 20	Eintracht Frankfurt	6–0	VfR Offenbach	Germany
	Döpfer; Dietrich pen.'; Ehmer	Report		Attendance: 2,000; Referee: Müller

18 December 1927 21	Hanauer FC 93	1–4	Eintracht Frankfurt	Germany
	Dorn	Report	Schaller; Döpfer; Ehmer	Attendance: 2,000; Referee: Becker

25 December 1927 22	Eintracht Frankfurt	6–0	Sport 1860 Hanau	Germany
	Ehmer; Döpfer; Kellerhoff	Report		Attendance: 3,000; Referee: Flügel

==== League table ====
Pos	Team	Pld	W	D	L	GF	GA	GD	Pts	Promotion, qualification or relegation
1	Eintracht Frankfurt	22	20	1	1	93	13	+80	41	Qualification to Qualifier to the championship
2	FSV Frankfurt	22	17	2	3	87	25	+62	36	
3	Rot-Weiss Frankfurt	22	13	4	5	53	29	+24	30	
4	Union Niederrad	22	11	4	7	55	40	+15	26	
5	Hanauer FC 93	22	10	2	10	48	46	+2	22	
6	Viktoria Aschaffenburg	22	9	3	10	53	57	−4	21	
7	Kickers Offenbach	22	7	6	9	32	42	−10	20	
8	SpVgg Fechenheim	22	9	2	11	60	82	−22	20	
9	Sport 1860 Hanau	22	7	3	12	41	80	−39	17	
10	Viktoria 94 Hanau	22	4	4	14	37	74	−37	12	
11	VfR Offenbach	22	3	4	15	29	81	−52	10	Relegation to the second tier
12	VfL Germania 1894	22	3	3	16	41	60	−19	9	Relegation to the second tier

Source: RSSSF.com
Rules for classification: 1) Points

==== Results summary ====
Overall								Home						Away					
Pld	W	D	L	GF	GA	GD	Pts	W	D	L	GF	GA	GD	W	D	L	GF	GA	GD
22	20	1	1	93	13	+80	41	10	1	0	52	5	+47	10	0	1	41	8	+33

Source: Bundesliga

==== Results by round ====
Round	1	2	3	4	5	6	7	8	9	10	11	12	13	14	15	16	17	18	19	20	21	22
Ground	H	A	A	A	H	A	H	H	A	H	A	A	H	A	A	A	H	H	H	H	A	H
Result	W	W	W	W	W	W	W	W	W	D	W	W	W	W	L	W	W	W	W	W	W	W
Position	4	1	1	1	1	1	1	1	1	1	1	1	1	1	1	1	1	1	1	1	1	1

A = Away; H = Home; W = Win; D = Draw; L = Loss

=== South German championship round ===
==== League fixtures and results ====
1 January 1928 1	Eintracht Frankfurt	0–2	Bayern Munich	Frankfurt, Germany
	Ehmer (red card)	Report	Hutsteiner 6'; Haringer 85'	Attendance: 15,000

8 January 1928 2	Stuttgarter Kickers	1–1	Eintracht Frankfurt	Stuttgart, Germany
	Maneval	Report	Kissinger 12'	Stadium: Kickers-Platz; Attendance: 9,000; Referee: Gröschel

15 January 1928 3	Eintracht Frankfurt	4–1	Karlsruher FV	Germany
	Döpfer; Goldammer; Schaller; Kübert	Report	Quasten	Attendance: 12,000; Referee: Maul

5 February 1928 4	Eintracht Frankfurt	5–1	FV Saarbrücken	Frankfurt, Germany
	Döpfer; Kissinger; Dietrich; Schütz	Report	Schmidt	Stadium: Waldstadion; Attendance: 5,000; Referee: Schliefer

12 February 1928 5	SV Waldhof	2–7	Eintracht Frankfurt	Germany
	Decker 20'; Brückl	Report	Kissinger 21'; Schaller; Dietrich; Döpfer	Attendance: 10,000; Referee: Sackenreuther

19 February 1928 6	SpVgg Fürth	1–2	Eintracht Frankfurt	Fürth, Germany
	Franz 59'	Report	Kissinger 35'; Kellerhoff 56'	Stadium: Sportpark Ronhof; Attendance: 5,000; Referee: Fritz

26 February 1928 7	Eintracht Frankfurt	4–3	Wormatia Worms	Frankfurt, Germany
	Kissinger 13'; Döpfer 18'; Schaller 58'	Report	Müller 45' (pen.); Wolf 59', 69'	Stadium: Waldstadion; Attendance: 15,000; Referee: List

11 March 1928 8	Bayern Munich	2–2	Eintracht Frankfurt	Munich, Germany
	Welker; Haringer	Report	Kissinger 5'; Schaller 7'	Stadium: Stadion an der Grünwalderstraße; Attendance: 25,000; Referee: Speidel

18 March 1928 9	Eintracht Frankfurt	0–0	Stuttgarter Kickers	Frankfurt, Germany
		Report		Stadium: Waldstadion; Attendance: 15,000; Referee: Maul

25 March 1928 10	Karlsruher FV	1–2	Eintracht Frankfurt	Karlsruhe, Germany
	Quasten	Report	Ehmer; Dietrich	Attendance: 12,000; Referee: Fritz

1 April 1928 11	Eintracht Frankfurt	2–3	SpVgg Fürth	Frankfurt, Germany
	Döpfer 46' pen.'	Report	Frank 28'; Rupprecht 70'	Stadium: Waldstadion; Attendance: 35,000; Referee: Müller

15 April 1928 12	Wormatia Worms	0–1	Eintracht Frankfurt	Germany
		Report	Schaller 47'	Attendance: 8,000; Referee: Seelmacher

22 April 1928 13	FV Saarbrücken	2–4	Eintracht Frankfurt	Saarbrücken, Germany
	Komes 15'; Kraus	Report	Ehmer 3' (pen.); Kellerhoff 27', 75' (red card)	Attendance: 5,000; Referee: Bachmann

29 April 1928 14	Eintracht Frankfurt	5–4	SV Waldhof	Frankfurt, Germany
	Schaller; pen.'; Dietrich; Ehmer	Report	pen.'; Brückl; Skutlarek	Stadium: Waldstadion; Attendance: 12,000; Referee: Schmitt

==== League table ====
Pos	Team	Pld	W	D	L	GF	GA	GD	Pts	Promotion, qualification or relegation
1	Bayern Munich	14	10	4	0	41	17	+24	24	Qualification to Qualifier to the championship
2	Eintracht Frankfurt	14	9	3	2	39	23	+16	21	Qualification to Qualifier to the championship
3	SpVgg Fürth	14	8	4	2	37	15	+22	20	
4	Karlsruher FV	14	5	2	7	34	29	+5	12	
5	Stuttgarter Kickers	14	3	5	6	25	30	−5	11	
6	Wormatia Worms	14	4	3	7	28	37	−9	11	
7	SV Waldhof	14	3	3	8	33	42	−9	9	
8	FV Saarbrücken	14	2	0	12	19	63	−44	4	

Source: RSSSF.com
Rules for classification: 1) Points

==== Results summary ====
Overall								Home						Away					
Pld	W	D	L	GF	GA	GD	Pts	W	D	L	GF	GA	GD	W	D	L	GF	GA	GD
14	9	3	2	39	23	+16	21	4	1	2	19	12	+7	5	2	0	20	11	+9

Source: Bundesliga

==== Results by round ====
Round	1	2	3	4	5	6	7	8	9	10	11	12	13	14
Ground	H	A	H	H	A	A	H	A	H	A	H	A	A	H
Result	L	D	W	W	W	W	W	D	D	W	L	W	W	W
Position	8	6	3	4	4	2	2	2	2	2	3	2	2	2

A = Away; H = Home; W = Win; D = Draw; L = Loss

=== German championship knockout stage ===
==== League fixtures and results ====
8 July 1928 Round of 16	SpVgg Sülz 07	3–1	Eintracht Frankfurt	Cologne, Germany
	Swatosch 20', 80'; Zarges 38'	Report	Ehmer 43'	Stadium: Müngersdorfer Stadion; Attendance: 35,000; Referee: Schulz

== Squad ==
=== Squad and statistics ===
No.	Pos	Nat	Player	Total		Bezirksliga		South German Championship round		German Championship knockout stage	
No.	Pos	Nat	Player	Apps	Goals	Apps	Goals	Apps	Goals	Apps	Goals
	GK	(Germany) GER	Willy Trump	37	0	22	0	14	0	1	0
	DF		Friedel Egly	23	0	22	0	1	0	0	0
	DF	(Germany) GER	Rudi Kirchheim	14	0	0	0	13	0	1	0
	DF	(Germany) GER	Franz Schütz	36	1	22	0	14	1	0	0
	MF	(Germany) GER	Hans Bechtold	1	0	0	0	1	0	0	0
	MF	(Germany) GER	Bruno Goldammer	33	3	20	2	12	1	1	0
	MF	(Germany) GER	Fritz Kübert	35	1	22	0	12	1	1	0
	MF	(Germany) GER	Fritz Mauruschat (Note: Originally, the family name was Maurischat. By mistake a registrar in Berlin registered the name as "Mauruschat". When marrying in Frankfurt it would have taken too much time to correct the typing error and therefore Fritz formally kept the name Mauruschat)	11	0	0	0	10	0	1	0
	MF		James Müller	26	1	21	1	4	0	1	0
	FW		Karl Biehler	1	2	1	2	0	0	0	0
	FW	(Switzerland) SUI	Walter Dietrich	36	19	21	14	14	5	1	0
	FW	(Germany) GER	Karl Döpfer	33	22	19	15	14	7	0	0
	FW	(Germany) GER	Karl Ehmer	29	40	22	34	6	5	1	1
	FW		Kaufmann	6	1	6	1	0	0	0	0
	FW	(Germany) GER	Bernhard Kellerhoff	33	10	19	8	13	2	1	0
	FW	(Germany) GER	H Kissinger	14	8	0	0	13	8	1	0
	FW	(Germany) GER	Fritz Schaller	32	23	19	14	12	9	1	0
	FW	(Germany) GER	Heinrich Stamm	6	2	5	2	1	0	0	0
	FW	(Germany) GER	Georg Stroh	1	0	1	0	0	0	0	0

=== Transfers ===
In:

No.	Pos.	Nation	Player
—	FW	GER	Karl Ehmer (from EFC Kronberg)
—	FW	GER	H Kissinger (from ASV Nürnberg)
—	MF	GER	Fritz Mauruschat (from VfL Germania 1894)
—	FW	GER	Heinrich Stamm (from Eintracht Frankfurt academy)

Out:

No.	Pos.	Nation	Player
—	MF	GER	Karl Schönfeld (to unknown)

== See also ==
- 1928 German football championship

== Sources ==
- Matheja, Ulrich (2011). Unsere Eintracht - Eintracht Frankfurt - Die Chronik. Die Werkstatt. ISBN 978-3-89533-750-5.
