= 1929–30 Eintracht Frankfurt season =

Eintracht Frankfurt
1929–30 season
- Chairman: Egon Graf von Beroldingen
- Manager: Paul Oßwald
- Bezirksliga Main-Hessen: 1st / Champions
- South German Championship round: 1st / Champions
- German Championship knockout stage: Quarter-final
- Domestic cup competition: Not established yet
- Top goalscorer: League: Karl Ehmer (16); All: Karl Ehmer (37)
- Highest home attendance: 25,000 on three occasions (Bezirksliga and South German Championship round)
- Lowest home attendance: 5,000 on two occasions (Bezirksliga and South German Championship round)
- Average home league attendance: 12,273 (some Bezirksliga attendances are without records)

The 1929–30 Eintracht Frankfurt season was the 30th season in the club's football history. In 1929–30 the club played in the Bezirksliga Main-Hessen, then one of many top tiers of German football. It was the club's 3rd season in the Bezirksliga Main-Hessen.

The season ended up with Eintracht winning the South German championship for the first time, but later losing to Holstein Kiel in the quarter-final in the run for the German championship knockout stage.

== Matches ==
=== Legend ===
Win Draw Loss Postponed

=== Friendlies ===
28 July 1929	Eintracht Frankfurt	2–1	Union Niederrad	Frankfurt, Germany
	Stubb; Schaller	(Report)	Leichter	Stadium: Riederwaldstadion

3 August 1929	Eintracht Frankfurt	6–1	FC Schalke 04	Frankfurt, Germany
	Leis 2'; Ehmer; Kron; Schaller	(Report)	Schaarmann	Stadium: Riederwaldstadion; Attendance: 4,000; Referee: Hannewald

2 August 1929	Eintracht Frankfurt	1–2	Rot-Weiss Frankfurt	Frankfurt, Germany
	Goal	(Report)	Engel	Stadium: Riederwaldstadion; Attendance: 5,000; Referee: Birk

2 August 1929	Mainz 05	1–1	Eintracht Frankfurt
	Müller	(Report)	Ehmer	Attendance: 4,000; Referee: Schmidt

2 August 1929	Eintracht Frankfurt	4–2	Schwarz-Weiß Essen
	Dietrich; Joseph Kron (Elfmeter); Bernhard Leis; Fritz Schaller	(Report)	Thiekötter; Kreß	Referee: Ries

20 November 1929	Hertha BSC / Tennis Borussia Berlin	3–5	Eintracht Frankfurt	Berlin, Germany
	Welf; Wilhelm pen.'; Strohwig	(Report)	Ehmer; Wilhelm o.g.'; Goldammer; Gramlich	Stadium: Poststadion; Attendance: 15,000

22 December 1929	Stade Français	3–1	Eintracht Frankfurt	Montrouge, France
	Lafarge 11' (68), pen.' (80)	(Report)	Schaller 15'	Stadium: Stade Buffalo

25 December 1929	AS Cannes	1–2	Eintracht Frankfurt	Cannes, France
	67'	(Report)	Kellerhoff 42'; Trumpler 66'	Attendance: 2,500

26 December 1929	Olympique de Marseille	2–4	Eintracht Frankfurt	Marseille, France
	22'; 26'	(Report)	Ehmer 36', 85'; Kron 81'; Trumpler 82'	Attendance: 4,000; Referee: Jacu

29 December 1929	Sports Olympiques Montpelliér	2–4	Eintracht Frankfurt	Montpellier, France
	48'; 76'	(Report)	Trumpler 49'; Ehmer 78', 88'; Kron 86'	Attendance: 5,000

13 April 1930	FFV Sportfreunde 04	1–3	Eintracht Frankfurt
	Goal		Goal

20 April 1930	SpVgg Sülz 07	2–4	Eintracht Frankfurt	Cologne, Germany
	Swatosch	(Report)	Leis; Kellerhoff; Ehmer; Trumpler	Attendance: 6,000

21 April 1930	Bochum XI / TuS Werne	2–5	Eintracht Frankfurt
	Goal	(Report)	Goal

30 April 1930	Saar 05 Saarbrücken	3–1	Eintracht Frankfurt
	Goal		Goal

11 May 1930	FC Wacker 1900 Halle	0–4	Eintracht Frankfurt	Halle, Germany
		(Report)	Dietrich 2'; Ehmer 90' (pen.)	Stadium: Stadion an der Dessauer Straße; Attendance: 4,000

25 May 1930	Stuttgarter Kickers	4–3	Eintracht Frankfurt	Stuttgart, Germany
	Hofmann 10'; Gimpel pen.'	(Report)	Ehmer; Trumpler

7 June 1930	SC Erfurt	0–5	Eintracht Frankfurt	Erfurt, Germany
		(Report)	Ehmer; Möbs; Leis	Stadium: Sportpark; Attendance: 4,000

14 June 1930	Eintracht Frankfurt	1–0	FSV Frankfurt	Frankfurt, Germany
	Ehmer	(Report)		Stadium: Waldstadion; Attendance: 8,000; Referee: Keller

21 June 1930	Eintracht Frankfurt	4–0	FC Germania Milwaukee	Frankfurt, Germany
	Ehmer; Kron; Dietrich	(Report)		Stadium: Waldstadion; Attendance: 1,200; Referee: Fink

22 June 1930	Union Niederrad / Rot-Weiss Frankfurt	0–3	Eintracht Frankfurt / FSV Frankfurt
		(Report)	Wijk	Attendance: 1,500

25 June 1930	Rot-Weiss Frankfurt	4–3	Eintracht Frankfurt
	Goal	(Report)	Dietrich; Trumpler

=== Bezirksliga Main-Hessen ===
==== League table ====
Position	Team	Played	Goals	Points
1.	Eintracht Frankfurt (C)	14	33-12	23-5
2.	Rot-Weiss Frankfurt	14	26-17	16-12
3.	FSV Frankfurt	14	29-22	16-12
4.	Union Niederrad	14	35-26	16-12
5.	Kickers Offenbach	14	30-26	15-13
6.	Germania Bieber	14	23-25	13-15
7.	FC Hanau 93	14	27-40	9-19
8.	SpVgg Griesheim 02 (P)	14	20-55	4-24

	Qualification for the 1930 German football championship round
	Relegated to the second tier
(C)	1928–29 Bezirksliga Main-Hessen champions
(P)	Promoted from the second tier

==== Results by round ====
Round	1	2	3	4	5	6	7	8	9	10	11	12	13	14
Ground	A	A	H	H	A	A	H	H	H	A	H	H	A	A
Result	D	D	W	W	W	W	W	W	W	W	W	W	D	L
Position	3	6	3	2	1	1	1	1	1	1	1	1	1	1

Source: kicker.de
A = Away; H = Home; W = Win; D = Draw; L = Loss

==== Matches ====
25 August 1929 1	Germania Bieber	2–2	Eintracht Frankfurt	Bieber, Germany
	Dochtermann	(Report)	Leis 12'; Kellerhoff 85'	Stadium: Sportplatz am Waldhof; Attendance: 3,000; Referee: Dölker

1 September 1929 2	Kickers Offenbach	1–1	Eintracht Frankfurt	Bieber, Germany
	Mathes	(Report)	Karl Ehmer (87.)	Stadium: Stadion am Bieberer Berg; Attendance: 4,000; Referee: Keller

8 September 1929 3	Eintracht Frankfurt	1–0	Union Niederrad	Frankfurt, Germany
	Ehmer	(Report)		Stadium: Riederwaldstadion; Attendance: 5,000; Referee: Walter

15 September 1929 4	Eintracht Frankfurt	3–2	FSV Frankfurt	Frankfurt, Germany
	Knöpfle o.g' (1); Ehmer; Schaller	(Report)	Böttner	Stadium: Riederwaldstadion; Attendance: 25,000; Referee: Sackenreuther

22 September 1929 5	SpVgg Griesheim 02	0–4	Eintracht Frankfurt	Griesheim, Germany
	Dölp (red card)	(Report)	Schaller 20'; Ehmer	Attendance: 3,000; Referee: Rettelbach

6 October 1929 6	FC Hanau 93	1–6	Eintracht Frankfurt
	Goal	(Report)	Ehmer; Dietrich; Schaller; Döpfer	Attendance: 2,000

13 October 1929 7	Eintracht Frankfurt	1–0	Rot-Weiss Frankfurt	Frankfurt, Germany
	Dietrich 44'	(Report)		Stadium: Riederwaldstadion; Attendance: 10,000; Referee: Maul

20 October 1929 8	Eintracht Frankfurt	1–0	Germania Bieber	Frankfurt, Germany
	Döpfer	(Report)		Referee: Gotzl

27 October 1929 9	Eintracht Frankfurt	3–0	Kickers Offenbach	Frankfurt, Germany
	Ehmer 2', 58'; Gramlich 31'	(Report)		Stadium: Riederwaldstadion; Attendance: 5,000; Referee: Senffert

10 November 1929 10	FSV Frankfurt	0–1	Eintracht Frankfurt	Frankfurt, Germany
		(Report)	Gramlich	Stadium: Waldstadion; Attendance: 15,000; Referee: Keller

17 November 1929 11	Eintracht Frankfurt	4–0	SpVgg Griesheim 02	Frankfurt, Germany
	Ehmer; Dietrich	(Report)		Stadium: Riederwaldstadion; Referee: Bremser

1 December 1929 12	Eintracht Frankfurt	3–2	FC Hanau 93	Frankfurt, Germany
	Gramlich; Ehmer	(Report)	Philippi	Referee: Distler

8 December 1929 13	Rot-Weiss Frankfurt	1–1	Eintracht Frankfurt
	Kohoutek	(Report)	Schaller	Attendance: 7,000; Referee: Dölcker

15 December 1929 14	Union Niederrad	3–2	Eintracht Frankfurt
	Wießmeier; Lindner pen.'	(Report)	Schaller; Ehmer	Attendance: 5,000

=== South German Championship round, North West division ===
==== Fixtures and results ====
5 January 1930 1	Freiburger FC	2–3	Eintracht Frankfurt
	Schütz o.g.'; Fehrle	(Report)	Ehmer; Schaller 85'	Attendance: 6,000; Referee: Götzel

12 January 1930 2	Eintracht Frankfurt	2–1	SpVgg Fürth	Frankfurt, Germany
	Trumpler 20'; Ehmer 55'	(Report)	Leinberger 78'	Stadium: Waldstadion; Attendance: 25,000; Referee: Fritz

19 January 1930 3	FK Pirmasens	4–4	Eintracht Frankfurt	Pirmasens, Germany
	Hartmann 37', 51'; Michel 60'; Babo 80'	(Report)	Trumpler; Ehmer 20' (pen.); Kellerhoff	Attendance: 10,000; Referee: Speidel

26 January 1930 4	Bayern Munich	5–1	Eintracht Frankfurt	Munich, Germany
	Pöttinger; Bergmaier; Haringer pen.'; Schmid	(Report)	Kellerhoff	Attendance: 25,000; Referee: Walter

2 February 1930 5	Eintracht Frankfurt	5–3	Wormatia Worms	Frankfurt, Germany
	Trumpler; Ehmer; Dietrich	(Report)	Müller pen'; Winkler	Stadium: Waldstadion; Attendance: 5,000; Referee: Müller

9 February 1930 6	SV Waldhof	1–3	Eintracht Frankfurt	Mannheim, Germany
	Brückl 88'	(Report)	Ehmer 30' (pen.); Trumpler	Attendance: 8,000; Referee: Brendel

16 February 1930 7	Eintracht Frankfurt	5–2	VfB Stuttgart	Frankfurt, Germany
	Trumpler 14'; Ehmer 19', 63'; Dietrich 46'; Kellerhoff 70'	(Report)	Koch 82'; Stadelmann 84'	Stadium: Riederwaldstadion; Attendance: 8,000; Referee: Seyfferth

23 February 1930 8	VfB Stuttgart	1–3	Eintracht Frankfurt	Stuttgart, Germany
	Koch 85'	(Report)	Dietrich 6', 75'; Leis 14'	Attendance: 9,000; Referee: Maul

9 March 1930 9	Eintracht Frankfurt	7–2	FK Pirmasens	Frankfurt, Germany
	Goldammer 30', 68'; Ehmer 32', 43', 50', 85'; Leis 33'	(Report)	Hergert 57' (pen.); Michel	Stadium: Riederwaldstadion; Attendance: 8,000; Referee: Schmitt

16 March 1930 10	SpVgg Fürth	1–1	Eintracht Frankfurt	Fürth, Germany
	Faust 70'	(Report)	Leis 55'	Stadium: Sportpark Ronhof; Attendance: 15,000; Referee: Glöckner

23 March 1930 11	Eintracht Frankfurt	4–1	Freiburger FC	Frankfurt, Germany
	Ehmer; Kellerhoff	(Report)	Fehrle	Attendance: 7,000; Referee: Bohn

30 March 1930 12	Eintracht Frankfurt	2–0	SV Waldhof	Frankfurt, Germany
	Dietrich 7'; Hauth 75' (o.g.)	(Report)		Stadium: Riederwaldstadion; Attendance: 12,000; Referee: Mayer

6 April 1930 13	Wormatia Worms	1–2	Eintracht Frankfurt	Worms, Germany
	Schüler o.g.'	(Report)	Leis 43'; Ehmer 75'	Stadium: Wormatia-Stadion; Attendance: 7,000; Referee: Fritz

27 April 1930 14	Eintracht Frankfurt	3–2	Bayern Munich	Frankfurt, Germany
	Ehmer 4'; Dietrich 80'	(Report)	Bergmaier; Pöttinger	Stadium: Waldstadion; Attendance: 25,000; Referee: Schmitt

Position	Team	Played	Goals	Points
1.	Eintracht Frankfurt	14	45-26	24-4
2.	SpVgg Fürth	14	45-20	17-11
3.	Bayern Munich	14	55-30	16-12
4.	FK Pirmasens	14	35-44	16-12
5.	VfB Stuttgart	14	42-39	14-14
6.	SV Waldhof	14	31-38	10-18
7.	Wormatia Worms	14	23-39	10-18
8.	Freiburger FC	14	29-69	5-23

Qualification for the 1930 German football championship round

=== German Championship knockout stage ===
18 May 1930 Round of 16	Eintracht Frankfurt	1–0	VfL Benrath	Frankfurt, Germany
	Ehmer 75'	(Report)	Hoffmann (red card); Schmitz (red card)	Stadium: Waldstadion; Attendance: 15,000; Referee: Peters

1 June 1930 Quarter-final	Holstein Kiel	4–2	Eintracht Frankfurt	Berlin, Germany
	Ludwig 24'; Widmaier 34'; Esser 51'; Ritter 83'	(Report)	Trumpler 58', 87'	Attendance: 10,000; Referee: Birlem

== Squad ==
=== Squad and statistics ===
No.	Pos	Nat	Player	Total		League		South German championship round		All German championship round	
No.	Pos	Nat	Player	Apps	Goals	Apps	Goals	Apps	Goals	Apps	Goals
	GK	(Germany) GER	Hausmann	1	0	0	0	1	0	0	0
	GK	(Germany) GER	Schüler	4	0	1	0	2	0	1	0
	GK	(Germany) GER	Willy Trumpp	25	0	13	0	11	0	1	0
	DF	(Germany) GER	Krämer	1	0	1	0	0	0	0	0
	DF	(Germany) GER	Willi Pfeiffer	27	0	13	0	13	0	1	0
	DF	(Germany) GER	Franz Schütz	18	0	9	0	7	0	2	0
	DF	(Germany) GER	Hans Stubb	16	0	6	0	9	0	1	0
	MF	(Germany) GER	Bruno Goldammer	30	2	14	0	14	2	2	0
	MF	(Germany) GER	Rudolf Gramlich	21	4	6	4	13	0	2	0
	MF	(Germany) GER	Fritz Kübert	8	0	8	0	0	0	0	0
	MF	(Germany) GER	Hugo Mantel	30	0	14	0	14	0	2	0
	FW	(Switzerland) SUI	Walter Dietrich	29	11	13	3	14	8	2	0
	FW	(Germany) GER	Karl Döpfer	6	2	6	2	0	0	0	0
	FW	(Germany) GER	Karl Ehmer	30	37	14	16	14	20	2	1
	FW	(Germany) GER	Bernhard Kellerhoff	23	4	7	1	14	3	2	0
	FW	(Germany) GER	Joseph Kron	5	0	3	0	1	0	1	0
	FW	(Germany) GER	Bernhard Leis	20	5	13	1	6	4	1	0
	FW	(Germany) GER	Fritz Schaller	21	6	13	5	8	1	0	0
	FW	(Germany) GER	Theodor Trumpler	14	7	0	0	12	5	2	2
	FW	(Germany) GER	Walsch	1	0	0	0	1	0	0	0

=== Transfers ===
In:

No.	Pos.	Nation	Player
—	MF	GER	Rudolf Gramlich (from Sportfreunde Freiberg)
—	GK	GER	Hausmann (from Eintracht Frankfurt Academy)
—	DF	GER	Krämer (from Eintracht Frankfurt Academy)
—	GK	GER	Schüler (from Eintracht Frankfurt Academy)
—	FW	GER	Walsch (from Eintracht Frankfurt Academy)
—	MF	GER	Joseph Kron (from SpVgg 60/94 Hanau)
—	FW	GER	Bernhard Leis (from Kelsterbach)
—	FW	GER	Theodor Trumpler (from Germania Ginnheim)

Out:

No.	Pos.	Nation	Player
—	MF	GER	Hans Bechtold (to unknown)
—	GK	GER	Hermann Judisch (to unknown)
—	FW	GER	H Kissinger (to unknown)
—	MF	GER	Willy Klar (to unknown)
—	FW	GER	Kreuz (to unknown)
—	DF	GER	Fritz Mauruschat (to unknown)
—	MF	GER	Heinrich Stamm (to unknown)
—	DF	GER	Heinrich Vesper (to unknown)
—	DF	GER	Rudolf Kirchheim (retired)

== See also ==
- 1930 German football championship

== Sources ==
- Matheja, Ulrich (2011). Unsere Eintracht - Eintracht Frankfurt - Die Chronik. Die Werkstatt. ISBN 978-3-89533-750-5.
