= 1926–27 Eintracht Frankfurt season =

Eintracht Frankfurt
1926–27 season
- Chairman: Fritz Steffan / Heinrich Berger (1926–1927); Horst Rebenschütz (1927)
- Manager: Walter Dietrich / Friedel Egly (player-managers)
- Bezirksliga Main: 2nd / Runners-Up
- South German Runners-Up Championship round: 3rd
- South German Cup: Third round
- Top goalscorer: League: Karl Döpfer (9); All: Karl Döpfer (12)
- Highest home attendance: 15,000 26 December 1926 v FSV Frankfurt (league)
- Lowest home attendance: 2,000 19 September 1926 v Viktoria Aschaffenburg (league)
- Average home league attendance: 5,556

The 1926–27 Eintracht Frankfurt season was the 27th season in the club's football history.

In 1926–27 the club played in the Bezirksliga Main, the top tier of German football. It was the club's 4th season in the Bezirksliga Main. The season ended up with Eintracht finishing the Bezirksliga Main as runners-up. In the South German Runners-Up Championship round finished as 3rd.

== Matches ==
=== Legend ===
Win Draw Loss Postponed

=== Friendlies ===
25 July 1926	Würzburger Kickers (Germany)	2–8	(Germany) Eintracht Frankfurt	Würzburg, Germany
	55' (o.g.); 87' (pen.)	Report	Kellerhoff 2'; Pfeiffer 25'; Weber 80'; Dietrich	Referee: Schneider

31 July 1926	Eintracht Frankfurt (Germany)	2–2	(Germany) VfL Neu-Isenburg	Frankfurt, Germany
	Kellerhoff; Dietrich	Report	Eck	Stadium: Riederwaldstadion

8 August 1926	VfB Stuttgart (Germany)	3–3	(Germany) Eintracht Frankfurt	Stuttgart, Germany
	Vallendor; Gerlinger	Report	Dietrich; Pfeiffer (red card) 60'	Stadium: VfB-Platz auf dem Cannstadter Wasen; Referee: Niederberger

22 August 1926	Phönix Ludwigshafen (Germany)	0–2	(Germany) Eintracht Frankfurt	Edenkoben, Germany
		Report	Kellerhoff	Referee: Albrecht

28 August 1926	1860 Munich (Germany)	0–1	(Germany) Eintracht Frankfurt	Munich, Germany
		Report	Schaller	Stadium: Sportplatz an der Grünwalder Straße; Attendance: 1,500; Referee: Meßberger

29 August 1926	Ulmer FV 94 (Germany)	1–5	(Germany) Eintracht Frankfurt	Germany
	Goal	Report	Goal

16 January 1927	Eintracht Frankfurt (Germany)	2–2	(Germany) VfR Mannheim	Germany
	Stroh 32'	Report	Fleischmann 36'	Referee: Carow

23 January 1927	Eintracht Frankfurt (Germany)	2–4	(Germany) Stuttgarter Kickers	Frankfurt, Germany
	Dietrich; Klüh	Report	Lieb; Ludwig During (o.g.); Welz; Keßler	Stadium: Riederwaldstadion; Referee: Birk

30 January 1927	Eintracht Frankfurt (Germany)	3–5	(Germany) SpVgg Fürth	Frankfurt, Germany
	Dietrich; Stroh; Kaufmann	Report	Ascherl 5'; Franz; Seiderer 25'; Franz	Stadium: Waldstadion; Attendance: 10,000

6 February 1927	Eintracht Frankfurt (Germany)	5–3	(France) Red Star Olympique	Frankfurt, Germany
	Dietrich; Kaufmann; Stroh; Egly (pen.)	Report	Domergue	Stadium: Riederwaldstadion; Attendance: 4,000

15 April 1927	1. SV Solingen-Gräfrath 03 (Germany)	4–6	(Germany) Eintracht Frankfurt	Solingen, Germany
	Goal	Report	(pen.); Dietrich; Pfeiffer; (pen.)

17 April 1927	Essener SC Preußen (Germany)	0–1	(Germany) Eintracht Frankfurt	Germany
		Report	55'	Attendance: 1,000

18 April 1927	Alemannia Dortmund (Germany)	2–6	(Germany) Eintracht Frankfurt	Germany
	Goal	Report	Goal

24 April 1927	Eintracht Frankfurt / FSV Frankfurt / Rot-Weiss Frankfurt XI (Germany)	1–3	(Uruguay) Peñarol	Frankfurt, Germany
	Dietrich 35'	Report	Pérez; Ruotta (pen.)	Stadium: Waldstadion; Attendance: 10,000; Referee: Bauwens

7 May 1927	Fortuna Leipzig (Germany)	5–1	(Germany) Eintracht Frankfurt	Leipzig, Germany
	Goal	Report	Goal

8 May 1927	Guts Muts Dresden (Germany)	2–5	(Germany) Eintracht Frankfurt	Dresden, Germany
	Goal	Report	Döpfer; Stamm; Kellerhoff

15 May 1927	Kurhessen Kassel (Germany)	2–5	(Germany) Eintracht Frankfurt	Germany
	Goal		Goal

21 May 1927	Union Krefeld (Germany)	1–2	(Germany) Eintracht Frankfurt	Krefeld, Germany
	Goal	Report	10'

22 May 1927	Düren XI (Germany)	2–7	(Germany) Eintracht Frankfurt	Düren, Germany
	Goal	Report	Kellerhoff

26 May 1927	Eintracht Frankfurt (Germany)	3–4	(Netherlands) Blauw-Wit Amsterdam	Frankfurt, Germany
	Goal	Report	Goal	Stadium: Waldstadion; Attendance: 7,000; Referee: Haseneier

29 May 1927	Eintracht Frankfurt (Germany)	3–3	(Germany) Freiburger FC	Frankfurt, Germany
	Goal	Report	Goal	Stadium: Riederwaldstadion; Referee: Massing

4 June 1927	Eintracht Frankfurt (Germany)	7–2	(Germany) VfB Leipzig	Frankfurt, Germany
	Ehmer	Report	Goal	Referee: Böhres

12 June 1927	Wormatia Worms (Germany)	6–2	(Germany) Eintracht Frankfurt	Worms, Germany
	L Müller 10' 25' 48'; Völker		11'; Ehmer 38' (pen.)	Referee: Gehring

18 June 1927	Eintracht Frankfurt (Germany)	10–1	(Germany) SG Hoechst	Germany
	Goal		Goal

25 June 1927	Eintracht Frankfurt (Germany)	0–4	(Germany) FSV Frankfurt	Frankfurt, Germany
	Pfeiffer (red card)	Report	Brück 48', 65'; Wjyk 70', 72'	Stadium: Waldstadion; Attendance: 15,000; Referee: Schneider

29 June 1927	Rödelheimer FC (Germany)	0–7	(Germany) Eintracht Frankfurt	Frankfurt, Germany
		Report	Ehmer; Dietrich; Döpfer

=== Bezirksliga Main ===
==== League fixtures and results ====
5 September 1926 1	Eintracht Frankfurt	3–1	Hanauer FC 93	Frankfurt, Germany
	Pfeiffer; Dietrich; Kellerhoff	Report	Schäfer	Stadium: Riederwaldstadion; Attendance: 5,000; Referee: Hussel

12 September 1926 2	SpVgg 03 Neu-Isenburg	1–1	Eintracht Frankfurt	Neu-Isenburg, Germany
	Feldbusch	Report	Döpfer 75'	Attendance: 3,000; Referee: Boeres

19 September 1926 3	Eintracht Frankfurt	2–1	Viktoria Aschaffenburg	Germany
	Schaller; Döpfer	Report	Eckert	Attendance: 2,000; Referee: Freiländer

26 September 1926 4	VfL Germania 1894	1–2	Eintracht Frankfurt	Frankfurt, Germany
	Hiller	Report	Schaller; Dietrich (pen.)	Attendance: 2,000; Referee: Gerling

3 October 1926 5	Eintracht Frankfurt	2–1	Union Niederrad	Frankfurt, Germany
	Egly; Schaller	Report	Rosenberger	Stadium: Riederwaldstadion; Attendance: 2,500; Referee: List

10 October 1926 6	Viktoria 94 Hanau	0–2	Eintracht Frankfurt	Hanau, Germany
	Neidhardt (red card); Fiedler (red card)	Report	Egly; Kellerhoff; Kübert (red card)	Attendance: 2,000; Referee: Morczinczyk

17 October 1926 7	FSV Frankfurt	3–2	Eintracht Frankfurt	Frankfurt, Germany
	Gattermann; Strehlke; Bretteville	Report	Döpfer (pen.); Schaller	Attendance: 8,000; Referee: Maul

24 October 1926 8	Eintracht Frankfurt	2–1	Rot-Weiss Frankfurt	Frankfurt, Germany
	Egly; Döpfer	Report	K. Etsch	Stadium: Riederwaldstadion; Attendance: 4,000; Referee: Bohn

31 October 1926 9	Eintracht Frankfurt	2–0	Kickers Offenbach	Frankfurt, Germany
	Döpfer 72'; Franz Schütz 77'	Report		Stadium: Riederwaldstadion; Attendance: 8,000; Referee: Mossmann

14 November 1926 10	Hanauer FC 93	1–1	Eintracht Frankfurt	Hanau, Germany
	Klingler 44'	Report	Goldammer	Stadium: Platz an der Schönen Aussicht; Attendance: 2,000; Referee: Ullmann

21 November 1926 11	Eintracht Frankfurt	3–0	SpVgg 03 Neu-Isenburg	Frankfurt, Germany
	Stroh; Schaller 86'	Report		Stadium: Riederwaldstadion; Attendance: 7,000; Referee: Herl

28 November 1926 12	Viktoria Aschaffenburg	2–1	Eintracht Frankfurt	Aschaffenburg, Germany
	Münstermann	Report	Egly (pen.)	Attendance: 2,500; Referee: Gottmann

5 December 1926 13	Eintracht Frankfurt	2–1	VfL Germania 1894	Frankfurt, Germany
	Goldammer (pen.); Döpfer	Report	Tumm	Stadium: Riederwaldstadion; Attendance: 4,000; Referee: Müller

12 December 1926 14	Union Niederrad	3–4	Eintracht Frankfurt	Frankfurt, Germany
	Merkel (pen.); (pen.)	Report	Stroh; Dietrich; Döpfer	Referee: Lämmermann

19 December 1926 15	Eintracht Frankfurt	7–0	Viktoria 94 Hanau	Frankfurt, Germany
	Stroh; Kellerhoff; Döpfer; Kaufmann; Dietrich	Report		Attendance: 2,500; Referee: Uhl

26 December 1926 16	Eintracht Frankfurt	0–1	FSV Frankfurt	Frankfurt, Germany
		Report	Wyk 80'	Stadium: Riederwaldstadion; Attendance: 15,000; Referee: Sauer

2 January 1927 17	Rot-Weiss Frankfurt	2–3	Eintracht Frankfurt	Frankfurt, Germany
	Koos; Tümpfel	Report	Döpfer; Franz Schütz; Stroh	Attendance: 6,000; Referee: Müller

9 January 1927 18	Kickers Offenbach	0–2	Eintracht Frankfurt	Offenbach, Germany
		Report	Kaufmann 68'; Stroh	Stadium: Stadion am Bieberer Berg; Attendance: 2,500; Referee: Plendl

==== League table ====
Pos	Team	Pld	W	D	L	GF	GA	GD	Pts	Promotion, qualification or relegation
1	FSV Frankfurt	18	14	3	1	62	18	+44	31	Qualification to Qualifier to the championship
2	Eintracht Frankfurt	18	13	2	3	41	19	+22	28	Qualification to Qualifier to the championship
3	Kickers Offenbach	18	8	4	6	29	26	+3	20	
4	Rot-Weiss Frankfurt	18	7	5	6	29	22	+7	19	
5	SpVgg 03 Neu-Isenburg	18	8	2	8	34	31	+3	18	
6	Hanauer FC 93	18	5	6	7	26	31	−5	16	
7	VfL Germania 1894	18	5	5	8	25	32	−7	15	
8	Union Niederrad	18	7	0	11	46	48	−2	14	
9	Viktoria Aschaffenburg	18	5	1	12	31	58	−27	11	
10	Viktoria 94 Hanau	18	2	4	12	13	51	−38	8	

Source: RSSSF.com
Rules for classification: 1) Points

==== Results summary ====
Overall								Home						Away					
Pld	W	D	L	GF	GA	GD	Pts	W	D	L	GF	GA	GD	W	D	L	GF	GA	GD
18	13	2	3	36	24	+12	41	8	0	1	23	6	+17	5	2	2	13	18	−5

Source: Bundesliga

==== Results by round ====
Round	1	2	3	4	5	6	7	8	9	10	11	12	13	14	15	16	17	18
Ground	H	A	H	A	H	A	A	H	H	A	H	A	H	A	H	H	A	A
Result	W	D	W	W	W	W	L	W	W	D	W	L	W	W	W	L	W	W
Position	2	4	3	3	3	2	3	3	2	2	2	2	2	2	2	2	2	2

A = Away; H = Home; W = Win; D = Draw; L = Loss

=== South German Runners-Up Championship round ===
==== League fixtures and results ====
13 February 1927 1	1860 Munich	3–1	Eintracht Frankfurt	Munich, Germany
	Wendl 15'; Faubel; Stiglbauer	Report	Dietrich	Attendance: 10,000; Referee: Müller

20 February 1927 2	Eintracht Frankfurt	1–1	FV Saarbrücken	Frankfurt, Germany
	Egly (pen.)	Report	Kessler	Attendance: 5,000; Referee: Bohnenberger

27 February 1927 3	Karlsruher FV	2–2	Eintracht Frankfurt	Karlsruhe, Germany
	Quasten (pen.); Vogel 65'	Report	Weber; Egly	Attendance: 5,000; Referee: Helmschroth

13 March 1927 4	Eintracht Frankfurt	2–2	VfR Mannheim	Frankfurt, Germany
	Dietrich 35'	Report	Fleischmann 25'; Berk 55'	Stadium: Riederwaldstadion; Attendance: 6,000; Referee: Maul

20 March 1927 5	VfR Mannheim	2–1	Eintracht Frankfurt	Germany
	Hoßfelder	Report	Kellerhoff	Attendance: 3,000; Referee: Bachmann

27 March 1927 6	FV Saarbrücken	1–3	Eintracht Frankfurt	Saarbrücken, Germany
	Goal	Report	Kellerhoff 22'; Schaller	Attendance: 4,000; Referee: Löhr-Reus

3 April 1927 7	Eintracht Frankfurt	2–1	1860 Munich	Frankfurt, Germany
	Döpfer 10' 55'	Report	Franz Schütz 83' (o.g.)	Attendance: 8,000; Referee: Beutel

10 April 1927 8	Eintracht Frankfurt	2–2	Karlsruher FV	Frankfurt, Germany
	Döpfer (pen.); Kaufmann	Report	Würzburger; Huber 88'	Attendance: 6,000; Referee: Seelmacher

==== League table ====
Pos	Team	Pld	W	D	L	GF	GA	GD	Pts	Promotion, qualification or relegation
1	1860 Munich	8	5	1	2	20	8	+12	11	Qualification to Qualifier to the championship
2	Karlsruher FV	8	3	4	1	15	12	+3	10	
3	Eintracht Frankfurt	8	2	4	2	14	14	0	8	
4	VfR Mannheim	8	3	1	4	16	20	−4	7	
5	FV Saarbrücken	8	1	2	5	9	20	−11	4	

Source: RSSSF.com
Rules for classification: 1) Points

==== Results summary ====
Overall								Home						Away					
Pld	W	D	L	GF	GA	GD	Pts	W	D	L	GF	GA	GD	W	D	L	GF	GA	GD
8	2	4	2	15	13	+2	8	1	3	0	7	6	+1	1	1	2	8	7	+1

Source: Bundesliga

==== Results by round ====
Round	1	2	3	4	5	6	7	8	9	10	11	12	13	14
Ground	H	A	H	H	A	A	H	A	H	A	H	A	A	H
Result	L	D	W	W	W	W	W	D	D	W	L	W	W	W
Position	8	6	3	4	4	2	2	2	2	2	3	2	2	2

A = Away; H = Home; W = Win; D = Draw; L = Loss

=== South German Cup ===
1 May 1927 Third round	FK Pirmasens	3–2	Eintracht Frankfurt	Pirmasens, Germany
	Kolb 6'; Brödel	Report	Pfeiffer	Referee: Hofsäß
Note: Byes for Round 1 and 2

== Squad ==
=== Squad and statistics ===
No.	Pos	Nat	Player	Total		Bezirksliga		South German Championship round		German Championship knockout stage	
No.	Pos	Nat	Player	Apps	Goals	Apps	Goals	Apps	Goals	Apps	Goals
	GK	(Germany) GER	Hermann Judisch	6	0	3	0	2	0	1	0
	GK	(Germany) GER	Willy Trump	21	0	15	0	6	0	0	0
	DF	(Germany) GER	Rudi Kirchheim	5	0	4	0	1	0	0	0
	DF	(Germany) GER	Willi Pfeiffer	22	3	14	1	7	0	1	2
	DF	(Germany) GER	Franz Schütz	26	2	17	2	8	0	1	0
	MF	(Germany) GER	Hans Bechtold	5	0	0	0	4	0	1	0
	MF		Friedel Egly	25	6	16	4	8	2	1	0
	MF	(Germany) GER	Bruno Goldammer	16	2	14	2	2	0	0	0
	MF	(Germany) GER	Fritz Kübert	15	0	11	0	4	0	0	0
	MF		James Müller	21	0	18	0	3	0	0	0
	MF	(Germany) GER	Karl Schönfeld	9	0	3	0	5	0	1	0
	FW		Karl Biehler	1	0	0	0	1	0	0	0
	FW	(Germany) GER	Willy Bierling	1	0	1	0	0	0	0	0
	FW	(Switzerland) SUI	Walter Dietrich	21	8	13	5	7	3	1	0
	FW	(Germany) GER	Karl Döpfer	25	12	17	9	7	3	1	0
	FW		Kaufmann	14	4	8	3	5	1	1	0
	FW	(Germany) GER	Bernhard Kellerhoff	23	5	15	3	7	2	1	0
	FW	(Germany) GER	Fritz Schaller	14	7	10	5	3	2	1	0
	FW	(Germany) GER	Georg Stroh	18	7	14	7	4	0	0	0
	FW	(Germany) GER	Friedrich Weber	9	1	5	0	4	1	0	0

=== Transfers ===
In:

No.	Pos.	Nation	Player
—	FW		Karl Biehler (from unknown)
—	FW		Kaufmann (from unknown)
—	FW	GER	Georg Stroh (from unknown)
—	MF	GER	Bruno Goldammer (from Helvetia Frankfurt)
—	GK	GER	Hermann Judisch (from Helvetia Frankfurt)
—	FW	GER	Bernhard Kellerhoff (from Schwarz-Weiß Essen)

Out:

No.	Pos.	Nation	Player
—	MF	GER	Bäuerle (to unknown)
—	FW		Adolf Block (to unknown)
—	FW	HUN	József Károly (to unknown)
—	FW	GER	Österling (to unknown)
—	DF	GER	Michael Grünerwald (emigrated to the United States)

== See also ==
- 1927 German football championship

== Sources ==
- Matheja, Ulrich (2011). Unsere Eintracht - Eintracht Frankfurt - Die Chronik. Die Werkstatt. ISBN 978-3-89533-750-5.
