= List of Eintracht Frankfurt seasons =

This is a list of seasons played by Eintracht Frankfurt in German and European football since 1920 when the club merged and introduced the name Eintracht for the first time. The club was founded in 1899. Eintracht Frankfurt have won the championship once, the DFB-Pokal five times and the UEFA Cup/Europa League twice.

The list details the club's achievements in all major competitions, and the top league goalscorer(s) for each season. For some seasons before 1963, the goalscoring information is incomplete but the player mentioned is almost certainly correct.

== Seasons ==
Season	League										DFB-Pokal	Europe		League top goalscorer(s)	
Season	Division	Pld	W	D	L	GF	GA	Pts	Pos	QGC	DFB-Pokal	Europe		Player(s)	Goals
1920–21	KLNM	20	12	5	3	31	18	29-11	1st	3rd	(Note: The first national German cup competition was not formed until 1935 under the name Tschammerpokal. After World War II the cup competition was revived under the moniker DFB-Pokal in 1952-53 and is considered as the successor of the first national cup competition. Prior to the introduction of the Bundesliga, clubs had to qualify by winning regional cup competitions.)	(Note: European club competitions did not begin until the 1955–56 season.)		Szabó	8
1921–22	KLNM	14	13	0	1	43	12	26-2	1st	Preliminary lost	(Note: The first national German cup competition was not formed until 1935 under the name Tschammerpokal. After World War II the cup competition was revived under the moniker DFB-Pokal in 1952-53 and is considered as the successor of the first national cup competition. Prior to the introduction of the Bundesliga, clubs had to qualify by winning regional cup competitions.)	(Note: European club competitions did not begin until the 1955–56 season.)		Pfeiffer	14
1922–23	KLNM	14	8	1	5	29	23	17-11	3rd	DNQ	(Note: The first national German cup competition was not formed until 1935 under the name Tschammerpokal. After World War II the cup competition was revived under the moniker DFB-Pokal in 1952-53 and is considered as the successor of the first national cup competition. Prior to the introduction of the Bundesliga, clubs had to qualify by winning regional cup competitions.)	(Note: European club competitions did not begin until the 1955–56 season.)		Klemm	9
1923–24	BLM	14	7	2	5	27	21	16-12	2nd	DNQ	(Note: The first national German cup competition was not formed until 1935 under the name Tschammerpokal. After World War II the cup competition was revived under the moniker DFB-Pokal in 1952-53 and is considered as the successor of the first national cup competition. Prior to the introduction of the Bundesliga, clubs had to qualify by winning regional cup competitions.)	(Note: European club competitions did not begin until the 1955–56 season.)		Pfeiffer	8
1924–25	BLM	14	3	6	5	15	20	12-16	6th	DNQ	(Note: The first national German cup competition was not formed until 1935 under the name Tschammerpokal. After World War II the cup competition was revived under the moniker DFB-Pokal in 1952-53 and is considered as the successor of the first national cup competition. Prior to the introduction of the Bundesliga, clubs had to qualify by winning regional cup competitions.)	(Note: European club competitions did not begin until the 1955–56 season.)		Riegel	5
1925–26	BLM	14	7	1	6	40	28	15-13	4th	DNQ	(Note: The first national German cup competition was not formed until 1935 under the name Tschammerpokal. After World War II the cup competition was revived under the moniker DFB-Pokal in 1952-53 and is considered as the successor of the first national cup competition. Prior to the introduction of the Bundesliga, clubs had to qualify by winning regional cup competitions.)	(Note: European club competitions did not begin until the 1955–56 season.)		Károly	9
1926–27	BLM	18	13	2	3	41	19	28-8	2nd	Runners-up round 3/5	(Note: The first national German cup competition was not formed until 1935 under the name Tschammerpokal. After World War II the cup competition was revived under the moniker DFB-Pokal in 1952-53 and is considered as the successor of the first national cup competition. Prior to the introduction of the Bundesliga, clubs had to qualify by winning regional cup competitions.)	(Note: European club competitions did not begin until the 1955–56 season.)		Döpfer	9
1927–28	BLMH	22	20	1	1	93	13	41-3	1st	2/8	(Note: The first national German cup competition was not formed until 1935 under the name Tschammerpokal. After World War II the cup competition was revived under the moniker DFB-Pokal in 1952-53 and is considered as the successor of the first national cup competition. Prior to the introduction of the Bundesliga, clubs had to qualify by winning regional cup competitions.)	(Note: European club competitions did not begin until the 1955–56 season.)		Ehmer	34
1928–29	BLMH	18	12	3	3	56	29	27-9	1st	4/8	(Note: The first national German cup competition was not formed until 1935 under the name Tschammerpokal. After World War II the cup competition was revived under the moniker DFB-Pokal in 1952-53 and is considered as the successor of the first national cup competition. Prior to the introduction of the Bundesliga, clubs had to qualify by winning regional cup competitions.)	(Note: European club competitions did not begin until the 1955–56 season.)		Ehmer	21
1929–30	BLMH	14	10	3	1	32	12	23-5	1st	1/8, Eliminated in the round of 8	(Note: The first national German cup competition was not formed until 1935 under the name Tschammerpokal. After World War II the cup competition was revived under the moniker DFB-Pokal in 1952-53 and is considered as the successor of the first national cup competition. Prior to the introduction of the Bundesliga, clubs had to qualify by winning regional cup competitions.)	(Note: European club competitions did not begin until the 1955–56 season.)		Ehmer	16
1930–31	BLMH	14	10	3	1	51	13	23-5	1st	2/8, Eliminated in the round of 8	(Note: The first national German cup competition was not formed until 1935 under the name Tschammerpokal. After World War II the cup competition was revived under the moniker DFB-Pokal in 1952-53 and is considered as the successor of the first national cup competition. Prior to the introduction of the Bundesliga, clubs had to qualify by winning regional cup competitions.)	(Note: European club competitions did not begin until the 1955–56 season.)		Ehmer	15
1931–32	BLMH	20	16	3	1	81	18	35-5	1st	RU	(Note: The first national German cup competition was not formed until 1935 under the name Tschammerpokal. After World War II the cup competition was revived under the moniker DFB-Pokal in 1952-53 and is considered as the successor of the first national cup competition. Prior to the introduction of the Bundesliga, clubs had to qualify by winning regional cup competitions.)	(Note: European club competitions did not begin until the 1955–56 season.)		Ehmer	34
1932–33	BLMH	18	12	5	1	45	16	29-7	2nd	2/8, SF	(Note: The first national German cup competition was not formed until 1935 under the name Tschammerpokal. After World War II the cup competition was revived under the moniker DFB-Pokal in 1952-53 and is considered as the successor of the first national cup competition. Prior to the introduction of the Bundesliga, clubs had to qualify by winning regional cup competitions.)	(Note: European club competitions did not begin until the 1955–56 season.)		Möbs	10
1933–34	GL	22	10	5	7	53	40	25-19	4th	DNQ	(Note: The first national German cup competition was not formed until 1935 under the name Tschammerpokal. After World War II the cup competition was revived under the moniker DFB-Pokal in 1952-53 and is considered as the successor of the first national cup competition. Prior to the introduction of the Bundesliga, clubs had to qualify by winning regional cup competitions.)	(Note: European club competitions did not begin until the 1955–56 season.)		Lindner	18
1934–35	GL	20	7	7	6	30	29	21-19	7th	DNQ	(Note: The first national German cup competition was not formed until 1935 under the name Tschammerpokal. After World War II the cup competition was revived under the moniker DFB-Pokal in 1952-53 and is considered as the successor of the first national cup competition. Prior to the introduction of the Bundesliga, clubs had to qualify by winning regional cup competitions.)	(Note: European club competitions did not begin until the 1955–56 season.)		Ehmer	9
1935–36	GL	18	10	5	3	32	19	25-11	3rd	DNQ	DNQ	(Note: European club competitions did not begin until the 1955–56 season.)		Möbs Schmitt	8
1936–37	GL	18	12	2	4	48	31	26-10	2nd	DNQ	DNQ	(Note: European club competitions did not begin until the 1955–56 season.)		Möbs	13
1937–38	GL	18	13	2	3	58	25	28-8	1st	2/4	R1	(Note: European club competitions did not begin until the 1955–56 season.)		Wirsching	25
1938–39	GL	18	11	0	7	49	34	22-14	3rd	DNQ	R1	(Note: European club competitions did not begin until the 1955–56 season.)		Schmitt	14
1939–40	GL	12	9	1	2	28	17	19-5	2nd	DNQ	R2	(Note: European club competitions did not begin until the 1955–56 season.)		Adamkiewicz	6
1940–41	GL	14	7	3	4	34	22	17-11	3rd	DNQ	R3	(Note: European club competitions did not begin until the 1955–56 season.)		Unsuffient data records	
1941–42	GL	12	8	1	3	46	20	17-7	2nd	DNQ	DNQ	(Note: European club competitions did not begin until the 1955–56 season.)		Kraus	11
1942–43	GL	18	6	4	8	33	38	16-20	5th	DNQ	R2	(Note: European club competitions did not begin until the 1955–56 season.)		Heilig	10
1943–44	GL	18	9	5	4	53	33	23-13	4th	DNQ	DNQ	(Note: European club competitions did not begin until the 1955–56 season.)		Kraus	20
1944–45	The season was abandoned due to World War II.														
1945–46	OL	30	9	7	14	71	75	25-35	11th	DNQ				Arheilger	15
1946–47	OL	38	16	14	8	72	50	46-30	3rd	DNQ				Wirsching	18
1947–48	OL	38	16	9	13	64	56	41-35	10th	DNQ				Baas	14
1948–49	OL	30	9	8	13	28	41	26-34	13th	DNQ				Baas	9
1949–50	OL	30	8	8	14	45	52	24-36	14th	DNQ				Schieth	15
1950–51	OL	34	12	10	12	56	64	34-34	8th	DNQ				Kraus Pfaff	12
1951–52	OL	30	15	4	11	52	43	34-26	4th	DNQ				Jänisch	12
1952–53	OL	30	16	7	7	62	49	39-21	1st	2/4	DNQ			Dziwoki	12
1953–54	OL	30	17	8	5	70	31	42-18	2nd	3/3	DNQ			Kress	17
1954–55	OL	30	15	6	9	56	36	36-24	4th	DNQ	R2			Weilbächer	13
1955–56	OL	30	13	5	12	56	49	31-29	6th	DNQ	DNQ	ICFC	Group stage	Pfaff	15
1956–57	OL	30	15	5	10	60	42	35-25	5th	DNQ	DNQ	ICFC	Group stage	Feigenspan	22
1957–58	OL	30	15	9	6	58	32	39-21	3rd	DNQ	DNQ	ICFC	Group stage	Sztáni	10
1958–59	OL	30	22	5	3	71	25	49-11	1st	1/4, Winners	DNQ	DNQ		Feigenspan	21
1959–60	OL	30	16	5	9	81	57	37-23	3rd	DNQ	DNQ	EC	RU	Stein	24
1960–61	OL	30	18	5	7	78	38	41-19	2nd	2/4	DNQ	DNQ		Stein	23
1961–62	OL	30	19	5	6	81	37	43-17	2nd	2/4	R1	DNQ		Schämer	26
1962–63	OL	30	14	11	5	56	32	39-21	4th	DNQ	SF	DNQ		Stein	12
1963–64	1. BL	30	16	7	7	65	41	39-21	3rd		RU	DNQ		Huberts	19
1964–65	1. BL	30	11	7	12	50	58	29-31	8th		R2	ICFC	R1	Huberts Solz	9
1965–66	1. BL	34	16	6	12	64	46	38-30	7th		R2	DNQ		Huberts	17
1966–67	1. BL	34	15	9	10	66	49	39-29	4th		QR	ICFC	SF	Solz	12
1967–68	1. BL	34	15	8	11	58	51	38-30	6th		R2	ICFC	R1	Bechtold	12
1968–69	1. BL	34	13	8	13	46	43	34-34	8th		R2	ICFC	R3	Grabowski Nickel	8
1969–70	1. BL	34	12	10	12	54	54	34-34	8th		QF	DNQ		Heese	12
1970–71	1. BL	34	11	6	17	39	56	28-40	15th		R2	DNQ		Nickel	13
1971–72	1. BL	34	16	7	11	71	61	39-29	5th		R2	DNQ		Nickel	13
1972–73	1. BL	34	15	4	15	58	54	34-34	8th		R2	UC	R1	Hölzenbein	13
1973–74	1. BL	34	15	11	8	63	50	41-27	4th		Winners	DNQ		Hölzenbein	12
1974–75	1. BL	34	18	7	9	89	49	43-25	3rd		Winners	ECWC	R2	Hölzenbein	16
1975–76	1. BL	34	13	10	11	79	58	36-32	9th		R4	ECWC	SF	Hölzenbein	16
1976–77	1. BL	34	17	8	9	86	57	42-26	4th		QF	DNQ		Hölzenbein	26
1977–78	1. BL	34	16	4	14	59	52	36-32	7th		R3	UC	QF	Hölzenbein	15
1978–79	1. BL	34	16	7	11	50	49	39-29	5th		SF	DNQ		Hölzenbein Lorant	8
1979–80	1. BL	34	15	2	17	65	61	32-36	9th		R3	UC	Winners	Cha	12
1980–81	1. BL	34	13	12	9	61	57	38-30	5th		Winners	UC	R3	Hölzenbein	11
1981–82	1. BL	34	17	3	14	83	72	83-72	8th		R2	ECWC	QF	Cha Nachtweih	11
1982–83	1. BL	34	12	5	17	48	57	29-39	10th		R1	DNQ		Cha	15
1983–84	1. BL	34	7	13	14	45	61	27-41	16th		R1	DNQ		Falkenmayer Svensson	8
1984–85	1. BL	34	10	12	12	62	67	32-36	12th		R2	DNQ		Krämer	10
1985–86	1. BL	34	7	14	13	35	49	28-40	15th		R1	DNQ		Theiss	7
1986–87	1. BL	34	8	9	17	42	53	25-43	15th		QF	DNQ		Turowski	7
1987–88	1. BL	34	10	11	13	51	50	31-37	9th		Winners	DNQ		Détári	11
1988–89	1. BL	34	8	10	16	30	53	26-42	16th		R2	ECWC	QF	Turowski	7
1989–90	1. BL	34	15	11	8	61	40	41-27	3rd		R1	DNQ		Andersen	18
1990–91	1. BL	34	15	10	9	63	40	40-28	4th		SF	UC	R1	Möller	16
1991–92	1. BL	38	18	14	6	76	41	50-26	3rd		R2	UC	R2	Yeboah	15
1992–93	1. BL	34	15	12	7	56	39	42-26	3rd		SF	UC	R2	Yeboah	20
1993–94	1. BL	34	15	8	11	57	41	38-30	5th		R2	UC	QF	Yeboah	18
1994–95	1. BL	34	12	9	13	41	49	33-35	9th		R2	UC	QF	Okocha Yeboah	7
1995–96	1. BL	34	7	11	16	43	68	32	17th		R2	IC	R2	Hagner	10
1996–97	2. BL	34	13	9	12	43	46	48	7th		R2	DNQ		Gaudino	9
1997–98	2. BL	34	17	13	4	50	32	64	1st		R3	DNQ		Sobotzik	10
1998–99	1. BL	34	9	10	15	44	54	37	15th		R2	DNQ		Yang	8
1999–2000	1. BL	34	12	5	17	42	44	39	13th		R3	DNQ		Salou	8
2000–01	1. BL	34	10	5	19	41	68	35	17th		R1	DNQ		Kryszałowicz	7
2001–02	2. BL	34	14	12	8	52	44	54	7th		R3	DNQ		Kryszałowicz	16
2002–03	2. BL	34	17	11	6	59	33	62	3rd		R2	DNQ		Skela	10
2003–04	1. BL	34	9	5	20	36	53	32	16th		R2	DNQ		Skela	8
2004–05	2. BL	34	19	4	11	65	39	61	3rd		R3	DNQ		Van Lent	16
2005–06	1. BL	34	9	9	16	42	51	36	14th		RU	DNQ		Amanatidis	12
2006–07	1. BL	34	9	13	12	46	58	40	14th		SF	UC	Group stage	Takahara	11
2007–08	1. BL	34	12	10	12	43	50	46	9th		R2	DNQ		Amanatidis	11
2008–09	1. BL	34	8	9	17	39	60	33	13th		R2	DNQ		Liberopoulos	9
2009–10	1. BL	34	12	10	12	47	54	46	10th		R3	DNQ		Meier	10
2010–11	1. BL	34	9	7	18	31	46	34	17th		R3	DNQ		Gekas	16
2011–12	2. BL	34	20	8	6	76	33	68	2nd		R2	DNQ		Meier	17
2012–13	1. BL	34	14	9	11	49	46	51	6th		R1	DNQ		Meier	16
2013–14	1. BL	34	9	9	16	40	57	36	13th		QF	UEL	Round of 32	Joselu	9
2014–15	1. BL	34	11	10	13	56	62	43	9th		R2	DNQ		Meier	19
2015–16	1. BL	34	9	9	16	34	52	36	16th		R2	DNQ		Meier	12
2016–17	1. BL	34	11	9	14	36	43	42	11th		RU	DNQ		Fabián	7
2017–18	1. BL	34	14	7	13	45	45	49	8th		Winners	DNQ		Haller	9
2018–19	1. BL	34	15	9	10	60	48	54	7th		R1	UEL	SF	Jović	17
2019–20	1. BL	34	13	6	15	59	60	45	9th		SF	UEL	Round of 16	Silva	12
2020–21	1. BL	34	16	12	6	69	53	60	5th		R2	DNQ		Silva	28
2021–22	1. BL	34	10	12	12	45	49	42	11th		R1	UEL	Winners	Borré	8
2022–23	1. BL	34	13	11	10	58	52	50	7th		RU	UCL	Round of 16	Kolo Muani	15
2023–24	1. BL	34	11	14	9	51	50	47	6th		R3	UECL	Round of 16	Marmoush	12
2024–25	1. BL	34	17	9	8	68	46	60	3rd		R3	UEL	QF	Ekitike Marmoush	15
2025–26	1. BL	34	11	11	12	61	65	44	8th		R2	UCL	League phase	Burkardt	13
2026–27	1. BL										R1, ongoing	DNQ			

== Key ==
- Pld = Matches played
- W = Matches won
- D = Matches drawn
- L = Matches lost
- GF = Goals for
- GA = Goals against
- Pts = Points
- Pos = Final position
- QGC = Qualification for the German championship, with varying modes until 1963
- KLNM = Kreisliga Nordmain (1st tier from 1919 until 1923)
- BLM = Bezirksliga Main (1st tier from 1923 until 1927)
- BLMH = Bezirksliga Main-Hessen (1st tier from 1927 until 1933)
- GL = Gauliga Südwest/Mainhessen (1st tier from 1933 until 1945)
- OL = Oberliga Süd (1st tier from 1945 until 1963)
- 1. BL = Bundesliga (1st tier since 1963)
- 2. BL = 2. Bundesliga (2nd tier since 1974)
- EC = European Cup
- ICFC = Inter-Cities Fairs Cup
- ECWC = European Cup Winners' Cup
- UC = UEFA Cup
- IC = UEFA Intertoto Cup
- UEL = UEFA Europa League
- UCL = UEFA Champions League
- UECL = UEFA Europa Conference League
- DNE = Did not enter
- DNQ = Did not qualify
- QR = Qualification Round
- R1 = Round 1
- R2 = Round 2
- R3 = Round 3 or Round of 16
- QF = Quarter-finals
- SF = Semi-finals
- RU = Runners-up

=== Colour coding ===
Champions or Top goalscorer	Runners-up	3rd or Semi-finals	Promoted	Relegated

== Attendance ==
Since the introduction of the Bundesliga in the 1963–64 season, Eintracht Frankfurt play their home matches at Waldstadion.

Remarks:

- In the period after the second expansion stage of Waldstadion (from 1953 until 1974) there are no official records about the maximum capacity. That is why the official capacity of this period is assumed as 81,000 which is Eintracht's record attendance achieved in a championship match versus FK Pirmasens on 23 May 1959.
- the coloured background displays: Waldstadion II Waldstadion III Commerzbank-Arena Deutsche Bank Park I Deutsche Bank Park II
- The * marked capacity figures point out that the ground has been under renovation.

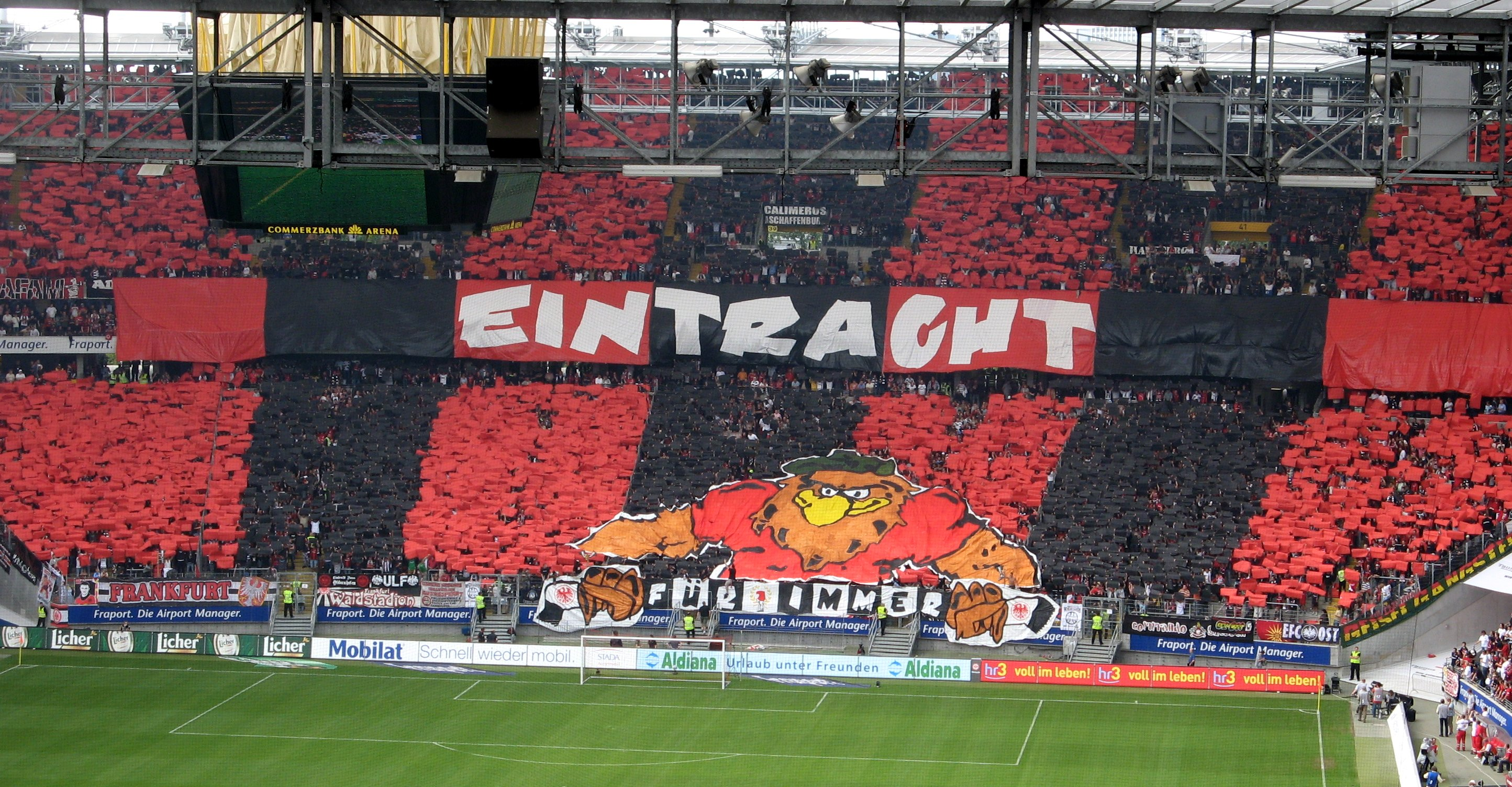
Eintracht Frankfurt fan choreography at the domestic North West Stand

Gates since the introduction of the Bundesliga
Season	League	Spectators total	Home matches	Average	Capacity	Average utilisation
1963–64	1.BL	397,000	15	26,466	81,000	32.67%
1964–65	1.BL	331,000	15	22,067	81,000	27.24%
1965–66	1.BL	461,000	17	27,118	81,000	33.48%
1966–67	1.BL	454,000	17	26,706	81,000	32.97%
1967–68	1.BL	340,700	17	20,041	81,000	24.74%
1968–69	1.BL	348,000	17	20,471	81,000	25.27%
1969–70	1.BL	275,500	17	16,206	81,000	20.01%
1970–71	1.BL	369,000	17	21,706	81,000	26.80%
1971–72	1.BL	355,200	17	20,894	81,000*	25.80%
1972–73	1.BL	236,500	17	13,912	81,000*	17.18%
1973–74	1.BL	433,000	17	25,471	81,000*	31.45%
1974–75	1.BL	404,400	17	23,788	62,200	38.24%
1975–76	1.BL	366,000	17	21,529	62,200	34.61%
1976–77	1.BL	408,000	17	24,000	62,200	38.59%
1977–78	1.BL	441,500	17	25,971	62,200	41.75%
1978–79	1.BL	438,000	17	25,765	62,200	41.42%
1979–80	1.BL	393,000	17	23,117	62,200	37.16%
1980–81	1.BL	364,500	17	21,441	62,200	34.47%
1981–82	1.BL	359,500	17	21,147	62,200	34.00%
1982–83	1.BL	370,900	17	21,818	62,200	35.08%
1983–84	1.BL	387,250	17	22,779	62,200	36.62%
1984–85	1.BL	402,500	17	23,676	62,200	38.07%
1985–86	1.BL	280,000	17	16,471	62,200	26.48%
1986–87	1.BL	314,500	17	18,500	62,200	29.74%
1987–88	1.BL	361,882	17	21,287	62,200	34.22%
1988–89	1.BL	294,849	17	17,344	62,200	27.88%
1989–90	1.BL	455,000	17	26,765	62,200	43.03%
1990–91	1.BL	413,273	17	24,310	62,200	39.08%
1991–92	1.BL	566,500	19	29,816	62,200	47.94%
1992–93	1.BL	431,500	17	25,382	62,200	40.81%
1993–94	1.BL	535,033	17	31,473	62,200	50.60%
1994–95	1.BL	508,500	17	29,912	62,200	48.09%
1995–96	1.BL	506,200	17	29,776	62,200	47.87%
1996–97	2.BL	276,000	17	16,235	62,200	26.10%
1997–98	2.BL	400,925	17	23,584	62,200	37.92%
1998–99	1.BL	558,455	17	32,850	62,200	52.81%
1999–2000	1.BL	609,745	17	35,867	62,200	57.66%
2000–01	1.BL	501,400	17	29,494	62,200	47.42%
2001–02	2.BL	240,500	17	14,147	62,200	22.74%
2002–03	2.BL	276,600	17	16,271	25,000*	65.08%
2003–04	1.BL	447,418	17	26,319	38,000*	69.26%
2004–05	2.BL	405,522	17	23,854	43,000*	55.47%
2005–06	1.BL	711,671	17	41,863	51,500	81.29%
2006–07	1.BL	809,624	17	47,625	51,500	92.48%
2007–08	1.BL	821,100	17	48,300	51,500	93.79%
2008–09	1.BL	799,200	17	47,012	51,500	91.29%
2009–10	1.BL	802,500	17	47,206	51,500	91.66%
2010–11	1.BL	805,200	17	47,365	51,500	91.97%
2011–12	2.BL	648,000	17	38,118	51,500	74.02%
2012–13	1.BL	816,750	17	48,044	51,500	93.29%
2013–14	1.BL	799,900	17	47,053	51,500	91.37%
2014–15	1.BL	809,500	17	47,618	51,500	92.46%
2015–16	1.BL	793,500	17	46,676	51,500	90.63%
2016–17	1.BL	836,000	17	49,176	51,500	95.49%
2017–18	1.BL	835,700	17	49,159	51,500	95.45%
2018–19	1.BL	846,500	17	49,794	51,500	96.69%
2019–20	1.BL	602,400 (Note: Due to the COVID-19 pandemic in Germany the remaining five Bundesliga matches had to be played behind closed doors.)	17	35,435	51,500	68.81%
2020–21	1.BL	14,000 (Note: Due to the COVID-19 pandemic in Germany fifteen matches had to be played behind closed doors while for the other two there were restrictions.)	17	411	51,500	0.08%
2021–22	1.BL	444,750 (Note: Due to the COVID-19 pandemic in Germany a majority of matches had to be played with restrictions.)	17	26,162	51,500	50.80%
2022–23	1.BL	850,700	17	50,041	51,500 (Note: Due to the reconstructions many matches had a slightly limited capacity (between 49,000 and 50,500).)	97.17%
2023–24	1.BL	968,300	17	56,959	58,000 (Note: Due to the reconstructions many matches had a slightly limited capacity (between 54,000 and 58,000).)	98.21%
2024–25	1.BL	979,200	17	57,600	58,000	99.31%
2025–26	1.BL	1,004,100	17	59,065	59,500 (Note: Minor reconstructions increased the stadium's maximum capacity to 59,500).)	99.27%
