= Trumpp =

Trumpp is a surname. Notable people with the surname include:

- Ernest Trumpp (1828–1885), German Christian missionary
- Willy Trumpp (1904–1999), German footballer

== See also ==
- Trump (surname)
