= 1. Bockenheimer FC 1899 =

German football club

1. Bockenheimer FC
- Full name: Erster Bockenheimer Fussball Club 1899
- Founded: 1899
- Dissolved: 1901
Home colours	Away colours

1. Bockenheimer FC was a German association football club from Frankfurt's western city district of Bockenheim. It was active between 1899 and 1901.

== History ==
Formed in 1899, 1. BFC had only a short existence playing in the FAB (Frankfurter Associations Bund or Frankfurt Associations Federation). Bockenheim joined founders Frankfurter FC Germania 1894, Frankfurter FC Victoria von 1899 and Frankfurter FC Kickers von 1899 in the league's second year, playing out of their home ground at Hundswiese. 1. Bockenheim is recognized as one of the founding members of the German Football Association (Deutscher Fussball Bund or German Football Association) in 1900 at Leipzig alongside each of the other FAB clubs. The league disappeared by mid-1905 as Frankfurter sides drifted away to compete in the larger SFV (Süddeutscher Fussball Verband or South German Football League).

At the end of 1901, 1. FC folded when they lost their ground and a significant number of club members left to join the army. The remaining footballers went on to help form and play for clubs such as Germania 1901 Bockenheim, Bockenheimer Fußball-Vereinigung 1901, FV 1901 Amicitia, FC 1902 Helvetia, and FC 1902 Bockenheim . These clubs would merge over the course of the following years to form the core of the present-day side Rot-Weiß Frankfurt

The memory of the short-lived Bockenheimer side is also preserved in the chronicles of present-day clubs Viktoria Frankfurt and Kickers Offenbach who both remember 1. BFC as the team they defeated in the first matches they ever played. Bockenheim fell 1:4 to Viktoria on 19 March 1899 and 1:2 to Offenbach on 7 July 1901.
