= Hellmut Maneval =

German footballer

Personal information
- Date of birth: 13 November 1898
- Date of death: 19 April 1967 (aged 68)
- Position: Midfielder

Senior career*
Years	Team	Apps	(Gls)
- Stuttgarter Kickers

International career
1923	Germany	1	(0)
- * Club domestic league appearances and goals

Hellmut Maneval (13 November 1898 – 19 April 1967) was a German international footballer.
