= VfB 1900 Offenbach =

German football club

VfB Offenbach
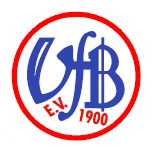
- Full name: Verein für Bewegungsspiele Offenbach am Main 1900 e.V.
- Founded: 1900
- Ground: Bierbrauerweg
- Chairman: Hans-Dieter Wolf
- League: Kreisoberliga Offenbach (VIII)
- 2015–16: Kreisliga A Offenbach-Ost (IX), 1st (promoted)
Home colours	Away colours

VfB Offenbach is a German association football club from the city of Offenbach am Main, Hesse. Currently playing in the Kreisliga A (IX), the team was a second division side during World War II and appeared for a single season (1943–44) in the Gauliga Hessen-Nassau (I).

== History ==
The club was established on 25 May 1900 as Fußball-Club Germania Offenbach. They merged with FC Melita 1900 Offenbach in 1917 to become Verein für Rasenspiele 1900 Offenbach. On 27 October 1921 VfR joined Kickers Offenbach to play as VfR Kickers Offenbach before again becoming an independent club in 1925.

VfR was forced out of its grounds by the Nazis in 1937 and in order survive the club merged with Sportverein Offenbach to form Verein für Bewegungsspiele Offenbach on 21 May 1938. SV brought together the traditions of a number of local sides; established in 1902 as FC Viktoria Offenbach, during World War I the team played as part of the combined wartime side Kriegsvereinigung FC Arminia-Viktoria Offenbach alongside FC Arminia 1904 Offenbach. The union was formalized on 26 March 1917 with creation of Offenbacher Fußballverein 02. That club in turn merged with Ballspiel-Club 1899 Offenbach in 1922 to form SV 1899 Offenbach before the two clubs again went their own ways in 1927.

VfB made two failed attempts to advance to first division Gauliga play in 1939–40 and 1941–42 before winning promotion in 1943. They played a single season at that level and were relegated after finishing 9th.

Nowadays the club exists as a lower division amateur side, playing in the tier nine Kreisliga A Offenbach-Ost until 2015–16, when it earned promotion to the Kreisoberliga.
