= Leonhard Weiß =

German footballer

Personal information
- Date of birth: 26 July 1907
- Date of death: 18 August 1981 (aged 74)
- Position: Forward

Senior career*
Years	Team	Apps	(Gls)
- 1. FC Nürnberg

International career
1931	Germany	1	(0)
- * Club domestic league appearances and goals

Leonhard Weiß (26 July 1907 – 18 August 1981) was a German international footballer.
