= Gauliga Südwest/Mainhessen =

Gauliga Südwest/Mainhessen Gauliga Hessen-Nassau Gauliga Westmark
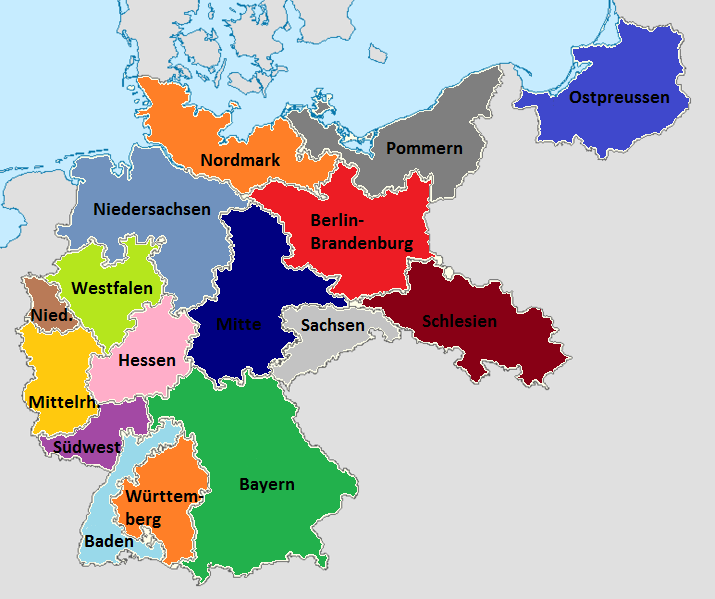
- Founded: 1933
- Folded: 1945
- Replaced by: Oberliga Süd; Oberliga Südwest
- Country: Nazi Germany
- States and Regions: People's State of Hesse; Hesse-Nassau; Palatinate; Saarland; Lorraine (from 1941)
- Gau (from 1934): Gau Hesse-Nassau; Saar-Palatinate (later:Westmark)
- Level on pyramid: Level 1
- Domestic cup: Tschammerpokal
- Last champions: Gauliga Hessen-Nassau: Kickers Offenbach Gauliga Westmark: KSG Saarbrücken (1943-44)

The Gauliga Südwest/Mainhessen was the highest football league in the German state of Hesse, the Bavarian province of Palatinate, the Saarland and some parts of the Prussian province of Hesse-Nassau from 1933 to 1941. From 1941, it also included parts of the occupied French region of Lorraine. Additionally, the league was from then on divided in the Gauligas Hessen-Nassau and Westmark.

Shortly after the formation of the league, the Nazis reorganised the administrative regions in Germany, and the Gaue Hesse Nassau and Saar-Palatinate (later: Westmark) replaced the old states and provinces.

== Overview ==
=== Gauliga Südwest/Mainhessen ===
The league was introduced by the Nazi Sports Office in 1933, after the Nazi take over of power in Germany. It replaced the Bezirksliga as the highest level of play in German football competitions.

The Gauliga Südwest/Mainhessen was established with twelve clubs from the states of Prussia, Bavaria, Hesse and Saarland. At the time of the league's establishment, the Saarland was actually not yet a part of Germany again.

The Gauliga replaced as such the Bezirksliga Rhein-Saar and the Bezirksliga Main-Hessen, who had been the highest leagues in this region until then. The clubs from Mannheim in the Bezirksliga Rhein-Saar however joined the Gauliga Baden, while some clubs from the Bezirksliga Main-Hessen joined the Gauliga Hessen.

In its first season, the league had twelve clubs, playing each other once at home and once away. The league winner qualified for the German championship while the bottom three teams were relegated. The next season, the league was reduced to eleven teams. In the 1935–36 season, it played with ten clubs and only two relegated teams. This system remained in place until 1939.

In 1939–40, the league played in two regional groups of seven, the Saarpfalz group and the Mainhessen group. The two league winners played out a home-and-away final. The 1940–41 season saw only one change in this set up, the groups were expanded to eight teams.

At the end of the 1940–41 season, the Gauliga was split into two completely separate leagues, forming the Gauligas Hessen-Nassau and Gauliga Westmark. It followed thereby the political borders of the Reichsgaue.

=== Gauligas Hessen-Nassau ===
The league was mostly formed by clubs from the Gauliga Südwest/Mainhessen (Mainhessen division) and some clubs from the south of the Gauliga Hessen.

In its first season, 1941–42, it consisted of 13 clubs in two groups with a home-and-away final for the two league winners. In the next two seasons, it operated as a single division with ten teams and two relegation spots.

The imminent collapse of Nazi Germany in 1945 gravely affected all Gauligas and football in Hesse at this stage had a very low priority. The 1944–45 season, if started at all was definitely not finished.

=== Gauliga Westmark ===
The new league, apart from the clubs from the Saarpfalz division of the Gauliga Westmark, also included two clubs from Lorraine, from Metz, and Sarreguemines (German: Saargemünd).

The league operated with nine clubs since FK Pirmasens withdrew early and two relegated team. It archived its desired strength of ten clubs the year after, in the 1942–43 season. It remained unchanged for the 1943–44 season.

The last season in 1944-45 was probably not started at all as much of Lorraine had been reoccupied by allied forces and the rest of the Reichsgau Westmnark was a front line zone.

=== Aftermath ===
With the end of the Nazi era, the Gauligas ceased to exist and while what was to become the state of Hesse found itself predominantly in the US occupation zone, all territories of the original Gauliga Südwest/Mainhessen west of the river Rhine were part of the French zone.

In the US zone, football soon resumed and the Oberliga Süd was formed in late 1945 as a replacement for the Gauligas in the south of Germany. Similar, in the French zone, the Oberliga Südwest was formed.

== National success ==
The clubs from the Südwest/Mainhessen region did not win a national championship in the Nazi era but achieved two finals appearances. The FSV Frankfurt lost the cup final to Rapid Wien in 1938 and the FV Saarbrücken lost the national championship to the Dresdner SC in 1943.

== Founding members of the league ==
The twelve founding members of the Gauliga Südwest/Mainhessen and their positions in the 1932-33 Bezirksliga Rhein/Saar and Bezirksliga Main/Hessen season were:

- Kickers Offenbach, 3rd Main division
- FK Pirmasens, winner Saar division
- Wormatia Worms, 2nd Hessen division
- Eintracht Frankfurt, 2nd Main division
- Borussia Neunkirchen, 3rd Saar division
- FSV Frankfurt, winner Main division
- 1. FC Kaiserslautern, 2nd Saar division
- Sportfreunde Saarbrücken, 4th Saar division
- Phönix Ludwigshafen, 2nd Rhein division
- SV Wiesbaden, 4th Hessen division
- FSV Mainz 05, winner Hessen division
- Alemannia/Olympia Worms, 3rd Hessen division

== League winners ==
The winners and runners-up of the league:

=== Winners and runners-up of the Gauliga Südwest/Mainhessen ===
Season	Winner	Runner-Up
1933–34	Kickers Offenbach	FK Pirmasens
1934–35	Phönix Ludwigshafen	FK Pirmasens
1935–36	Wormatia Worms	FK Pirmasens
1936–37	Wormatia Worms	Eintracht Frankfurt
1937–38	Eintracht Frankfurt	Borussia Neunkirchen
1938–39	Wormatia Worms	FSV Frankfurt
1939–40	Kickers Offenbach	1. FC Kaiserslautern
1940–41	Kickers Offenbach	FV Saarbrücken

=== Winners and runners-up of the Gauliga Hessen-Nassau ===
Season	Winner	Runner-Up
1941–42	Kickers Offenbach	Rot-Weiß Frankfurt
1942–43	Kickers Offenbach	FSV Frankfurt
1943–44	Kickers Offenbach	FC Hanau 93

=== Winners and runners-up of the Gauliga Westmark ===
Season	Winner	Runner-Up
1941–42	1. FC Kaiserslautern	FV Metz
1942–43	FV Saarbrücken	FV Metz
1943–44	KSG Saarbrücken	FV Metz

== Placings in the Gauliga 1933-44 ==
The complete list of all clubs participating in the league:

=== Hessen-Nassau clubs ===
Club	1934	1935	1936	1937	1938	1939	1940	1941	1942	1943	1944
Kickers Offenbach	1	3	6	3	4	4	1	1	1	1	1
Wormatia Worms	3	5	1	1	3	1	5	4	4	9	
Eintracht Frankfurt	4	7	3	2	1	3	2	3	2	5	4
FSV Frankfurt	6	4	5	5	5	2	3	5	3	2	3
SV Wiesbaden ^{1}	10			8	7	5	4	7	5		
FSV Mainz 05	11										
Alemannia/Olympia Worms	12										
Union Niederrad		6	8	9			5	6	3	7	10
Opel Rüsselsheim			9		10		7			8	6
Rot-Weiß Frankfurt						9	6	2	1	3	8
GfL Darmstadt							7				
Germania 94 Frankfurt								8			
FC Hanau 93									4	4	2
TSV Hanau									6		
SV 05 Wetzlar									7		
SV Darmstadt 98									2	10	
VfB Großauheim									5		
BSG Dunlop SV Hanau									6		
SpVgg Neu-Isenburg										6	5
VfL Rödelheim											7
VfB Offenbach											9

- ^{1} The SV Wiesbaden played under the name of KSG Wiesbaden from 1941.

=== Westmark clubs ===
Club	1934	1935	1936	1937	1938	1939	1940	1941	1942	1943	1944
Borussia Neunkirchen	5	8	4	4	2	6	2	3	5	3	4
1. FC Kaiserslautern	7	10			9		1	2	1	5	10
Sportfreunde Saarbrücken	8	9		10							
Phönix Ludwigshafen	9	1	10								
Saar 05 Saarbrücken		11									
FV Saarbrücken ^{2}			7	6	8	8		1	7	1	1
TSG 61 Ludwigshafen ^{3}						7	4	7	3	4	7
VfR Frankenthal							3	4	6	7	3
SpVgg Mundenheim								6	9		
SG Burbach								8			
FV Metz									2	2	2
Tura Ludwigshafen									4	6	5
TSG Saargemünd									8	8	6
TSG Oppau										9	
SC Altenkessel										10	
TSG Merlenbach											8
KSG Speyer											9

- ^{2} The FV Saarbrücken played under the name of KSG Saarbrücken from 1943.
- ^{3} The TSG 61 Ludwigshafen played under the name of KSG Ludwigshafen from 1943.
