= Wormatia-Stadion =

Stadium in Worms, Germany

Coordinates: 49°37′52.97″N 8°20′8.89″E

EWR-Arena
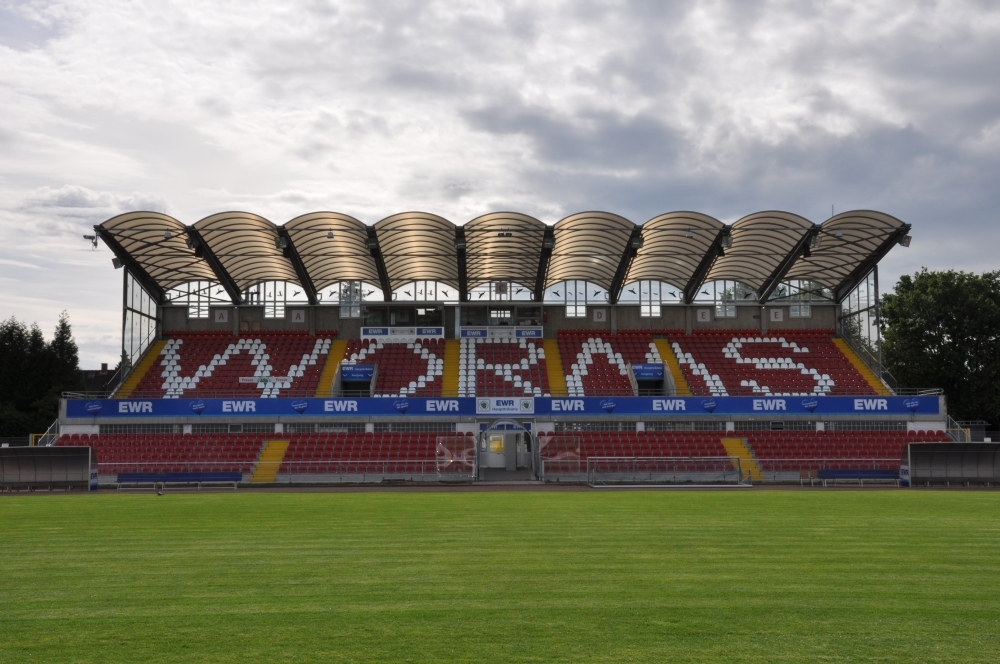
- Interactive map of EWR-Arena
- Former names: Wormatia-Stadion (1928–1933, 1945–2011); Adolf-Hitler-Kampfbahn (1933–1945)
- Location: Worms, Rhineland-Palatinate, Germany
- Owner: City of Worms
- Capacity: 5,724
- Executive suites: 2,418
- Surface: grass

Construction
- Built: 1927
- Renovated: 2008

EWR-Arena (called Wormatia-Stadion until 2011) is a multi-use stadium in Worms, Germany. It is currently used mostly for football matches and is the home of Wormatia Worms. The stadium has a capacity of 5,724 people. It opened in 1927 and was renovated in 2008 when Wormatia Worms were promoted into Regionalliga Süd.
