= Walter Dietrich =

Swiss footballer (1902-1979)

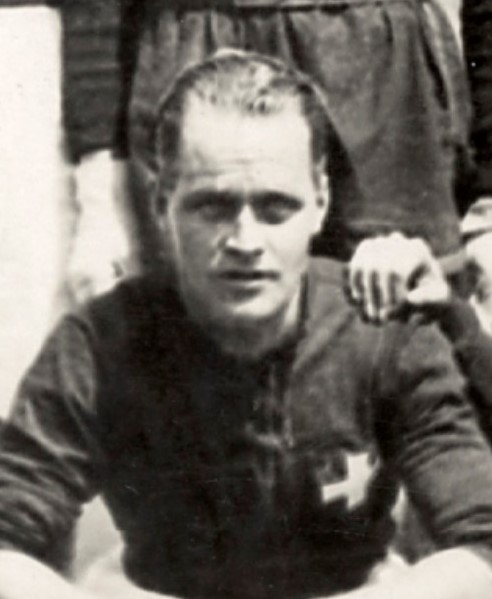
- Walter Dietrich in 1928

Personal information
- Full name: Walter Dietrich
- Date of birth: 24 December 1902
- Date of death: 27 November 1979 (aged 76)
- Position: Forward

Senior career*
Years	Team	Apps	(Gls)
1919–1922	FC Basel	8	(1)
1922–1923	Forward Morges		
1923–1925	Servette FC		
1925–1938	Eintracht Frankfurt	124	(37)

International career
1924–1928	Switzerland	14	(6)

Managerial career
- 1926–1927: Eintracht Frankfurt (player-manager)
- 1939: FC Basel
Medal record
Olympic Games
Representing Switzerland
Men's Football
Silver medal – second place	1924 Paris	Team competition
- * Club domestic league appearances and goals

Walter Dietrich (24 December 1902 – 27 November 1979) was a Swiss footballer who started his active career by FC Basel. Via Forward Morges he moved to Servette and finally in the summer of 1925 to Eintracht Frankfurt and here he ended his active football ten years later. He played as forward.

== Career ==
Dietrich joined Basel's first team in their 1919–20 season, but played only six test matches. He played his domestic league debut for the club in the first game of the next season, the away game on 26 September 1920 as Basel were defeated 1–4 by Young Boys. He scored his first goal for his club a week later on 3 October in the home game at the Landhof against Aarau as the two teams played a 2–2 draw.

Between the years 1919 and 1922 Dietrich played a total of 34 games for Basel scoring a total of five goals. Eight of these games were in the Swiss Serie A and 26 were friendly games. He scored one goal in the domestic league, the other four were scored during test games.

After playing one season for Forward Morges and two seasons for Servette he moved to Eintracht Frankfurt in 1925. Eintracht played in the Bezirksliga Main the highest association football league in the German state of Hesse and the Prussian province of Hesse-Nassau. Dietrich played ten seasons for Eintracht playing 208 league matches and scoring 66 goals.

Dietrich played 14 games for the Swiss national team. He was a member of the Swiss team, which won the silver medal in the football tournament at the 1924 Summer Olympics.

After his career Dietrich opened up an architecture firm. In 1937 when a stand of the first version of Riederwaldstadion burned down Dietrich's firm was pivotal in the reconstruction. In 1938 he returned to Switzerland and shortly took over his hometown club FC Basel that had just been relegated to the second tier.

== Honours ==
Switzerland

- Olympic Games
  - Silver: Summer Olympics 1924

Servette FC

- Swiss Serie A:
  - Champion: 1924–25

Eintracht Frankfurt

- Bezirksliga Main-Hessen:
  - Champion: 1927–28, 1928–29, 1929–30, 1930–31, 1931–32
  - Runner-up: 1932–33
- Southern German Championship
  - Champion: 1929–30, 1931–32
  - Runner-up: 1927–28, 1930–31
- German Championship
  - Runner-up: 1932
- Gauliga Südwest/Mainhessen:
  - Champion: 1937–38
  - Runner-up: 1936–37

== Sources ==
- Rotblau: Jahrbuch Saison 2017/2018. Publisher: FC Basel Marketing AG. ISBN 978-3-7245-2189-1
- Die ersten 125 Jahre. Publisher: Josef Zindel im Friedrich Reinhardt Verlag, Basel. ISBN 978-3-7245-2305-5
- Verein "Basler Fussballarchiv" Homepage
- Matheja, Ulrich (2011). Unsere Eintracht - Eintracht Frankfurt - Die Chronik. Die Werkstatt. ISBN 978-3-89533-750-5.
