= Fritz Mauruschat =

German footballer and manager

Personal information
- Full name: Fritz Mauruschat
- Date of birth: 19 December 1901
- Place of birth: Berlin, German Reich
- Date of death: 1974 (aged 72–73)
- Place of death: West Germany
- Position: Defender

Senior career*
Years	Team	Apps	(Gls)
- SC Minerva 93 Berlin
- FFV Sportfreunde 04
- VfL Germania 1894
1928–1929	Eintracht Frankfurt	13	(0)
- SV Westmark 05 Trier
- SC Minerva 93 Berlin
- Lufthansa SG Berlin

Managerial career
- 1949–1952: Tennis Borussia Berlin
- * Club domestic league appearances and goals

Fritz Mauruschat (1901–1974) was a German football player and manager.

In 1961, Mauruschat was head coach of West Berlin XI for their away tie against Barcelona in the Inter-Cities Fairs Cup. He was appointed as a replacement for Jupp Schneider, who was unable to travel with the team due to illness.
