= Hans Welker =

German footballer

Personal information
- Date of birth: 21 August 1907
- Place of birth: Munich, Germany
- Date of death: 24 July 1968 (aged 60)
- Place of death: Munich, West Germany
- Position: Forward

Senior career*
Years	Team	Apps	(Gls)
1925–1939	Bayern Munich		

International career
1931	Germany	1	(0)
- * Club domestic league appearances and goals

Hans Welker (21 August 1907 – 24 July 1968) was a German footballer.
