= Willi Winkler =

German footballer

Personal information
- Date of birth: 24 August 1903
- Date of death: 12 May 1967 (aged 63)
- Position: Forward

Senior career*
Years	Team	Apps	(Gls)
- Wormatia Worms

International career
1928	Germany	1	(0)
- * Club domestic league appearances and goals

Willi Winkler (24 August 1903 – 12 May 1967) was a German international footballer.
