= Bernhard Kellerhoff =

German footballer

Personal information
- Date of birth: 21 March 1900
- Place of birth: Germany
- Date of death: 22 October 1978 (aged 78)
- Place of death: West Germany
- Position: Winger

Youth career
- 1916–: Schwarz-Weiß Essen

Senior career*
Years	Team	Apps	(Gls)
–1926	Schwarz-Weiß Essen		
1926–1932	Eintracht Frankfurt		

Managerial career
- 193?–: SC 08 Münster
- 193?–1936: I. SC Göttingen 05
- 1946–1947: I. SC Göttingen 05
- 1948: Eintracht Frankfurt
- SG Germania Wiesbaden
- * Club domestic league appearances and goals

Bernhard Kellerhoff (21 March 1900 – 22 October 1980) was a German footballer. He played club football with Schwarz-Weiß Essen and Eintracht Frankfurt.

Schwarz-Weiß Essen academy product Bernhard Kellerhoff rose through the ranks of the West German team and reached championship play-offs 1925 where Essen were eliminated by FSV Frankfurt. In April 1926 Eintracht Frankfurt signed the left winger. In the 1929–30 he was banned for two months after slapping an opponent player during a tough match with SpVgg Griesheim 02. This ban meant that he missed Eintracht's South German championship run in 1930. A heavy knee injury during an encounter against Mainz sidelined him for good that meant a timely career end.

Despite being presumed to be one of the best left wingers of his time he was never called up for the national team. A football magazine reckoned that his exaggerated dribbling might have played a role in this. However, he was called up to the West and South German regional selections.

Kellerhoff worked as a tie merchant.

== Honours ==
- Bezirksliga Main-Hessen:
  - Champion: 1927–28, 1928–29, 1929–30, 1930–31, 1931–32
- Southern German Championship
  - Champion: 1929–30, 1931–32
  - Runner-up: 1927–28, 1930–31
- German Championship
  - Runner-up: 1932
