= TSV Hanau =

German football club

- Full name: Turn- und Sportverein 1860 Hanau e.V.
- Founded: 1860
- League: Kreisliga A Hanau (IX)
- 2018–19: 12th
Home colours	Away colours

TSV 1860 Hanau is a German association football club from the city of Hanau, Hesse near Frankfurt. Predecessor side Fußball-Club Viktoria 1894 Hanau was a founding member of the German Football Association (Deutscher Fussball Bund or German Football Association) in 1900 at Leipzig.

== History ==
The predecessor club Hanauer Tabakverein was established as a gymnastics association in 1840 but was broken up just ten years later when several of its members found themselves facing courts martial. On 9 November 1860 a new association, Turnverein der Cigarrenarbeiter Hanau was formed, which was renamed Turnverein Hanau in 1878. Three years later the club split in two with the departure of a number of its members to form Turngesellschaft Hanau 1881. Both of these clubs formed "Ballspielabteilungen", or ball play departments, in 1890 as English games such as football, rugby, and cricket were being popularized in continental Europe. TV Hanau then went on to establish a football-only department in 1905 which joined the SDFV (Süddeutschen Fußballverband or South German Football League) in 1912.

In 1922 TV was re-united with Turngesellschaft Hanau 1881 with the combined club taking on the name Turn- und Sportvereinigung 1860 Hanau. Just two years later the football department left to form a separate club called Sport 1860 Hanau which in turn would merge with the football club Fußball-Club Viktoria 1894 to become Spielvereinigung 1860/94 Hanau. A decade later, in 1934, the footballers re-joined TSV and the club was once again being called Turnverein Hanau.

In 1933 German football had been re-organized under the Third Reich into sixteen top-flight Gauligen. TV earned promotion to the Gauliga Hessen, Gruppe Süd in 1939 where they played for two seasons before joining the Gauliga Hessen-Nassau, which had emerged from the split of the Gauliga Südwest/Mainhessen into two divisions. The team played just one more season in the top tier before being relegated.

The club resumed its activities after the end of World War II in 1945 despite the destruction of its facilities. In 1957 it returned to the use of the name Turn- und Sportvereinigung 1860 Hanau.

The club has grown considerably since the end of the war and continues its tradition of participation in a wide variety of sports. In addition to fielding men's, women's and youth's football teams, TSV currently has departments for athletics, badminton, bowling, gymnastics, handball, hiking, table tennis, volleyball, and other activities.

== Famous players ==
- Rudi Völler, played in the Bundesliga before going on to play for and then coach the Germany national side.
