= Sigmund Haringer =

German footballer

Personal information
- Date of birth: 9 December 1908
- Place of birth: Munich, Germany
- Date of death: 23 February 1975 (aged 66)
- Place of death: West Germany
- Height: 1.74 m (5 ft 8 1/2 in)
- Position: Defender

Senior career*
Years	Team	Apps	(Gls)
1928–1934	Bayern Munich		
1934–1939	Wacker München		
1939–1940	1. FC Nürnberg		

International career
1931–1937	Germany	15	(0)
- * Club domestic league appearances and goals

Sigmund Haringer (9 December 1908 – 23 February 1975) was a German footballer

== Club career ==
He played club football with Bayern Munich, Wacker München and 1. FC Nürnberg. With Bayern he won the German football championship in 1932.

== International career ==
Haringer participated at the 1934 FIFA World Cup. Overall he won 15 caps for the Germany national team.
