= Willi Pfeiffer =

German footballer

Willy Pfeiffer
Personal information
- Date of birth: 27 March 1895
- Place of birth: German Empire
- Date of death: 12 March 1965 (aged 69)
- Place of death: West Germany
- Position: Midfielder

Youth career
- 1911–1912: Eintracht Frankfurt

Senior career*
Years	Team	Apps	(Gls)
1912–1922	Frankfurter Kickers / FFV / Eintracht Frankfurt	75+	(14+)
1922	Kickers Offenbach		
1922–1932	Eintracht Frankfurt	110+	(19+)
1932	Union Niederrad		

Managerial career
- 1932: Union Niederrad (player-manager)
- 1945: Eintracht Frankfurt (caretaker)
- * Club domestic league appearances and goals

Willy Pfeiffer (27 March 1895 – 12 March 1965) was a German footballer. He played club football with Eintracht Frankfurt and Kickers Offenbach.

Pfeiffer played for Frankfurter Kickers who merged with Victoria Frankfurt in 1911 to form Frankfurter FV that eventually became Eintracht Frankfurt in 1920. Between September and November 1922 he shortly played for Kickers Offenbach. In 1929–30 he was part of the Eintracht team that won the Southern German championship and again in 1931–32

For his performances he was called up to the Southern German selection.

Pfeiffer was described as a short-tempered player that tended to his opponents. Due to an assault in the Frankfurt derby between Eintracht and FSV Frankfurt in the 1927–28 campaign Pfeiffer was banned for a year.

In 1932 Pfeiffer left Eintracht to join Union Niederrad as a player-manager but finished his active career in the same year.

In 1938 Pfeiffer wrote a letter to the mayor describing himself as a national socialist despite there's no record that Pfeiffer ever entered the Nazi party. On the other hand, he had a long lasting friendship with former Eintracht track and field athlete Jew Moritz Fröhlich who emigrated to the United States. Pfeiffer sent Fröhlich a family picture as a souvenir. However, Pfeiffer was described as a conflicting character.

In 1945 he shortly acted as a caretaker manager for Eintracht.

Pfeiffer he was an honorary club member, honorary captain and member of the council of elders at Eintracht Frankfurt.

== Honours ==
- Nordkreis-Liga
  - Champion: 1911–12, 1912–13, 1913–14
- Southern German Championship
  - Runner-up: 1912–13, 1913–14
- Kreisliga Nordmain
  - Champion: 1919–20, 1920–21
  - Runner-up: 1921–22
- Bezirksliga Main-Hessen:
  - Champion: 1927–28, 1928–29, 1929–30, 1930–31, 1931–32
- Southern German championship
  - Champion: 1929–30, 1931–32
  - Runner-up: 1927–28, 1930–31
- German Championship
  - Runner-up: 1932

== Sources ==
- Matheja, Ulrich (2011). Unsere Eintracht - Eintracht Frankfurt - Die Chronik. Die Werkstatt. ISBN 978-3-89533-750-5.
