= Bruno Goldammer =

German footballer

Personal information
- Date of birth: 12 November 1904
- Place of birth: German Empire
- Date of death: 1968 or 1969 (aged 63–65)
- Place of death: West Germany
- Position: Midfielder

Senior career*
| Years | Team | Apps | (Gls) |
| –1926 | Helvetia Frankfurt | | |
| 1926–1933 | Eintracht Frankfurt | 120 | (9) |
- * Club domestic league appearances and goals

Bruno Goldammer (12 November 1904 – 1968 or 1969) was a German footballer. He played club football as midfielder with Helvetia Frankfurt (today Rot-Weiss Frankfurt) and Eintracht Frankfurt.

Goldhammer played for Helvetia Frankfurt. When the Bockenheim based clubs Helvetia and VfR 01 merged to form SC Rot-Weiss Frankfurt, Goldammer left to join Eintracht.

In his second season, Goldammer captained the Riederwald side and led the Eagles to step out from under the shadow of local rivals FSV Frankfurt, winning four Bezirksliga Main-Hessen titles in a row from 1928 to 1932. When Eintracht won their first South German championship, Goldammer played all 30 competitive matches.

His role was described as a tireless destroyer who made valuable contributions in build-up play. Apart from good heading, he regularly fired forceful long shots at goal.

In 1928, he was called up twice for the South German regional selection.

In the 1931–32 campaign, he lost his spot to Bernhard Leis and only appeared once more when he replaced German international Hans Stubb as a left defender in a 1–0 victory over Hanau 93.

== Honours ==
=== National ===
- German Championship
  - Runners-up: 1932
- Southern German Championship
  - Champion: 1929–30, 1931–32
  - Runner-up: 1927–28, 1930–31
- Bezirksliga Main-Hessen:
  - Winner: 1927–28, 1928–29, 1929–30, 1930–31, 1931–32
  - Runner-up: 1932–33

== Sources ==
- Matheja, Ulrich (2011). Unsere Eintracht - Eintracht Frankfurt - Die Chronik. Die Werkstatt. ISBN 978-3-89533-750-5.
