= Fritz Kübert (footballer, born 1906) =

German footballer

Personal information
- Date of birth: 16 February 1906
- Place of birth: Germany
- Date of death: September 1998 (aged 92)
- Place of death: Germany
- Position: Midfielder

Youth career
- 1920–1925: Eintracht Frankfurt

Senior career*
Years	Team	Apps	(Gls)
1925–1930	Eintracht Frankfurt	99	(3)
- * Club domestic league appearances and goals

Fritz Kübert (16 February 1906 – September 1998) was a German footballer. He played club football with Eintracht Frankfurt.

Fritz Kübert rose through the ranks of the Eintracht Frankfurt academy and played in the first team from 1920. He played as right midfielder. After winning the South German championship in 1930 he lost his starter spot to Rudi Gramlich.

After World War II, in December 1946 he was elected as committee member at Eintracht. He held this position until 1950 and was Eintracht youth director from 1955 to 1966.

He was an honorary member of Eintracht Frankfurt.

Fritz Kübert had a son also named Fritz Kübert who played one Bundesliga match for Eintracht Frankfurt.

== Honours ==
- Southern German championship:
  - Champion: 1929–30
  - Runner-up: 1927–28
- Bezirksliga Main-Hessen:
  - Winners: 1927–28, 1928–29, 1929–30

== Sources ==
- Matheja, Ulrich (2011). Unsere Eintracht - Eintracht Frankfurt - Die Chronik. Die Werkstatt. ISBN 978-3-89533-750-5.
