= Franz Schütz =

German footballer

Personal information
- Full name: Franz Schütz
- Date of birth: 6 December 1900
- Place of birth: Offenbach am Main, German Empire
- Date of death: 22 March 1955 (aged 54)
- Place of death: West Germany
- Position: Defender

Youth career
- –1920: BSC 99 Offenbach

Senior career*
Years	Team	Apps	(Gls)
1920	Kickers Offenbach		
1920	BSC Köln		
1920–1925	Mülheimer SV		
1925–1934	Eintracht Frankfurt	130	(3)

International career
1929–1932	Germany	11	(0)
- * Club domestic league appearances and goals

Franz Schütz (6 December 1900 – 22 March 1955) was a German footballer born in Offenbach am Main.

== Club career ==
He played in defence for Eintracht Frankfurt, together with Hans Stubb.

== International career ==
Schütz also played for Germany 11 times between 1929 and 1932.

== Honours ==
- German Championship: Runner-up 1931–32
- Southern German Championship: 1929–30, 1931–32; runner-up 1927–28, 1930–31
- Bezirksliga Main-Hessen: 1927–28, 1928–29, 1929–30, 1930–31, 1931–32; runner-up 1932–33

== Trivia ==
He is an honoured captain at Eintracht.

== Sources ==
- Matheja, Ulrich (2011). Unsere Eintracht - Eintracht Frankfurt - Die Chronik. Die Werkstatt. ISBN 978-3-89533-750-5.
