= Willy Trumpp =

German footballer

Personal information
- Date of birth: 28 July 1904
- Place of birth: Germany
- Date of death: 1999 (aged 94–95)
- Place of death: Germany
- Position: Goalkeeper

Youth career
- –1920: BSC 1919 Frankfurt
- 1920–1923: Eintracht Frankfurt

Senior career*
Years	Team	Apps	(Gls)
1923–1930	Eintracht Frankfurt	129+	(0)
- * Club domestic league appearances and goals

Willy Trumpp (28 July 1904 – 1999) was a German footballer. He played club football with Eintracht Frankfurt.

In 1920 Trumpp joined Eintracht from fellow Frankfurt team BSC 1919. In the 1923–24 season he earned the regular goalkeeper spot and his brilliant saves rescued Eintracht from a possible relegation. His biggest sportive success was winning the Southern German championship in 1930. After this season he took a back seat and practised as a dentist in the Frankfurt borough of Praunheim. Nevertheless he remained an Eintracht member and helped rebuilding the club's football section after World War II. From 1965 to 1969 he was part of the club's council of elders. After being awarded with the silver and golden badge of honour, Willy Trumpp was awarded the Eintracht Frankfurt honorary club membership for his long year work at the club. Additionally, the state of Hesse awarded him the state honorary prize. Trumpp was a regular attendee of Eintracht home matches until the early 1990s.

== Honours ==
- Southern German championship:
  - Champion: 1930
  - Runner-up: 1927–28
- Bezirksliga Main-Hessen:
  - Winner: 1927–28, 1928–29, 1929–30

== Sources ==
- Matheja, Ulrich (2011). Unsere Eintracht - Eintracht Frankfurt - Die Chronik. Die Werkstatt. ISBN 978-3-89533-750-5.
