= Riederwaldstadion =

Football stadium in Frankfurt, Germany

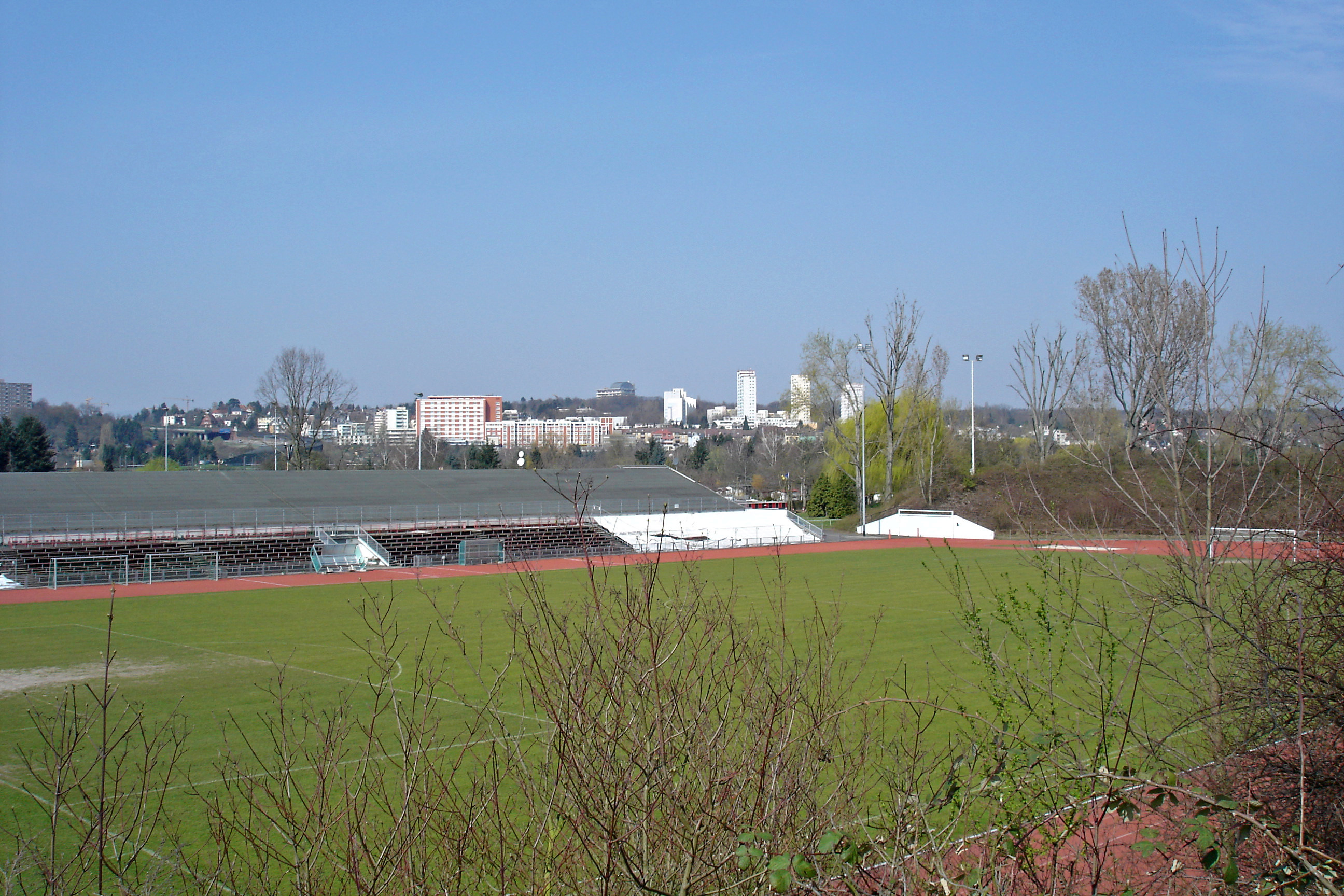
- Interactive map of Riederwaldstadion
- Location: Seckbach, Frankfurt, Germany
- Coordinates: 50°7′59″N 8°43′49″E
- Capacity: 6,000
- Surface: Grass
- Field size: 104 m x 67 m

Construction
- Built: 1920

Tenant
- Eintracht Frankfurt U23 (until 2008)

Riederwaldstadion is a stadium in Seckbach district of Frankfurt am Main in Germany. It was home pitch for Eintracht Frankfurt U23 until 2008, when Eintracht Frankfurt U23 moved.

The stadium was destroyed during World War II in 1943 and was rebuilt in 1952.
