= Karl Ehmer =

German footballer (1906–1978)

Personal information
- Date of birth: 25 November 1906
- Date of death: 12 November 1978 (aged 71)
- Position: Forward

Senior career*
| Years | Team | Apps | (Gls) |
| –1927 | Kronberg | | |
| 1927–1938 | Eintracht Frankfurt | 217 | (224) |
| 1939–1940 | VfL Benrath | | |
- * Club domestic league appearances and goals

Karl Ehmer (25 November 1906 – 12 November 1978) was a German footballer who played most of his career as a forward for Eintracht Frankfurt from 1927 to 1938.

The forwarder from Kronberg was one of the greatest goalscorers of his time. Already in his first season for the Eagles he scored 40 goals in official competitions. Thanks to Ehmer Frankfurt reached the runner-up spot and qualified for the final round to the 1928 German football championship. On 8 July 1928, Eintracht lost 3–1 at Müngersdorfer Stadion to SpVgg Sülz 07. Ehmer scored the only goal for Eintracht.

In the 1931–32 season he marked 55 goals in 38 competitive matches (33 goals in 19 league matches) and to this day still holds the season record for Eintracht Frankfurt. In the final round of the German football championship he scored seven goals in four matches but could not score on 12 June 1932 in the final match in Nürnberg against Bayern Munich. He was never capped for Germany. In total, Ehmer appeared in 13 final round matches, scoring 18 times. He played in 130 league games and marked 138 goals. Ehmer netted 68 goals 74 South German championship matches and one goal in five matches in the Tschammer-Pokal. In total he scored 224 goals in 222 competitive matches.

In 1938 he retired after he lost his starting position following an appendectomy. Though he shortly returned from retirement and appeared as a guest player at VfL Benrath in 1939–40 As a coach, he worked for Union Niederrad. Until his death on 12 November 1978 he was an honorary member and honorary captain at Eintracht Frankfurt.

== Honours ==
- Participation in the final match of the German championship 1932
- South German champion: 1930 and 1932
- Verbandsliga (nationwide) topscorer: 1932 and 1933
