= 1931–32 Eintracht Frankfurt season =

Eintracht Frankfurt
1931–32 season
- Chairman: Egon Graf von Beroldingen
- Manager: Paul Oßwald
- Bezirksliga Main-Hessen: 1st / Champions
- South German Championship round: 1st / Champions
- German Championship knockout stage: Runners-up
- Domestic cup competition: Not established yet
- Top goalscorer: League: Karl Ehmer (34); All: Karl Ehmer (55)
- Highest home attendance: 20,000 on two occasions v FSV Frankfurt (Bezirksliga and South German Championship round)
- Lowest home attendance: 1,500 6 September 1931 v Germania Bieber (Bezirksliga and South German Championship round)
- Average home league attendance: 6,618

The 1931–32 Eintracht Frankfurt season was the 32nd season in the club's football history. In 1931–32 the club played in the Bezirksliga Main-Hessen, then one of many top tiers of German football. It was the club's 5th season in the Bezirksliga Main-Hessen.

The season ended up with Eintracht winning the South German championship for the second time, but later losing to Bayern Munich in the final match.

== Matches ==
=== Legend ===
Win Draw Loss Postponed

=== Friendlies ===
2 August 1931	Eintracht Frankfurt	6–2	Stuttgarter Kickers
	Ehmer; Möbs	(Report)	Goal	Referee: Schmidt

27 September 1931	Union Niederrad	3–5	Eintracht Frankfurt
	Goal	(Report)	Goal

18 November 1931	Berliner SV 92	1–2	Eintracht Frankfurt	Berlin, Germany
	Goal	(Report)	Schaller 30'; Ehmer	Stadium: Preußenplatz; Attendance: 12,000; Referee: Röhrbein

28 February 1932	SV Kassel / CSC 03 Kassel XI	2–7	Eintracht Frankfurt	Kassel, Germany
	Engelhardt	(Report)	Ehmer; Dietrich	Attendance: 5,000

26 March 1932	Minerva 93 Berlin	1–4	Eintracht Frankfurt	Berlin, Germany
	Elsholz	(Report)	Dietrich; Ehmer 24'; Möbs	Attendance: 12,000

27 March 1932	Tennis Borussia Berlin	1–2	Eintracht Frankfurt	Berlin, Germany
	Thönnissen 89'	(Report)	Ehmer 52', 85'	Attendance: 8,500

18 June 1932	Hammer SpVg	0–3	Eintracht Frankfurt
		(Report)	Ehmer	Attendance: 8,000

19 June 1932	Schwarz-Weiß Essen	2–7	Eintracht Frankfurt	Essen, Germany
	Hullisch; Pörtgen	(Report)	Trumpler 9'; Möbs; Kron pen'; Schaller	Stadium: Uhlenkrugstadion; Attendance: 6,000

25 June 1932	SV Wiesbaden	0–2	Eintracht Frankfurt
		(Report)	Trumpler 22'; Sottong 84'	Attendance: 5,000; Referee: Bohn

26 June 1932	Union Niederrad	1–4	Eintracht Frankfurt
	6'	(Report)	Kron; Schaller; Sottong	Referee: Hannewald

2 July 1932	FSV Frankfurt	3–3	Eintracht Frankfurt	Frankfurt, Germany
	Goal	(Report)	Goal	Stadium: Stadion am Bornheimer Hang; Attendance: 7,000; Referee: Schlosser

=== Bezirksliga Main-Hessen ===
==== League fixtures and results ====
9 August 1931 1	SpVgg Griesheim 02	1–6	Eintracht Frankfurt
	pen'	(Report)	Leis; Kron; Ehmer; Möbs	Attendance: 5,000; Referee: Bremser

16 August 1931 2	Eintracht Frankfurt	1–0	VfL Germania 1894	Frankfurt, Germany
	Möbs 5'	(Report)		Stadium: Riederwaldstadion; Attendance: 2,500; Referee: Oswalt

23 August 1931 3	Eintracht Frankfurt	1–1	Rot-Weiss Frankfurt	Frankfurt, Germany
	Möbs 35'	(Report)	Rutz 60' (pen.)	Stadium: Riederwaldstadion; Attendance: 12,000; Referee: Glaser

30 August 1931 4	FC Hanau 93	2–3	Eintracht Frankfurt
	Goal	(Report)	Möbs; Ehmer	Attendance: 4,000; Referee: Kotz

6 September 1931 5	Eintracht Frankfurt	6–1	Germania Bieber
	Schaller 12'; Möbs; Ehmer	(Report)	Leis o.g.'	Attendance: 1,500; Referee: Götzl

13 September 1931 6	Eintracht Frankfurt	5–2	FSV Heusenstamm	Frankfurt, Germany
	Bauer o.g.'; Leis pen.'; Ehmer pen.'	(Report)	Wiedemann	Stadium: Riederwaldstadion; Attendance: 3,000; Referee: Uhl

4 October 1931 7	Eintracht Frankfurt	1–1	FSV Frankfurt	Frankfurt, Germany
	Dietrich 89'	(Report)	Wühler 90'	Stadium: Riederwaldstadion; Attendance: 20,000; Referee: Gabler

11 October 1931 8	VfL Neu-Isenburg	1–3	Eintracht Frankfurt
	Dietz 40'	(Report)	Ehmer 30'; Trumpler 57'; Kellerhoff 82'	Attendance: 3,500; Referee: Iserloh

18 October 1931 9	Kickers Offenbach	2–5	Eintracht Frankfurt	Bieber, Germany
	Stein (Elfmeter) pen.'; Meid	(Report)	Ehmer; Möbs	Stadium: Stadion am Bieberer Berg; Attendance: 8,000; Referee: Dölker

25 October 1931 10	Union Niederrad	0–1	Eintracht Frankfurt
		(Report)	Gramlich 5'	Attendance: 4,000; Referee: Becker

1 November 1931 11	Eintracht Frankfurt	9–0	SpVgg Griesheim 02	Frankfurt, Germany
	Schaller; Möbs; Ehmer; Gramlich	(Report)		Stadium: Riederwaldstadion; Attendance: 3,000; Referee: Neuweiler

8 November 1931 12	VfL Germania 1894	1–7	Eintracht Frankfurt	Frankfurt, Germany
	Steudle	(Report)	Fritz Schaller; August Möbs; Karl Ehmer; Walter Dietrich; Bernhard Kellerhoff	Stadium: Sportplatz Sandhöfer Wiesen; Attendance: 2,500; Referee: Keßler

15 November 1931 13	Rot-Weiss Frankfurt	2–1	Eintracht Frankfurt	Frankfurt, Germany
	Engel; Rutz 80'	(Report)	Ehmer	Stadium: Waldstadion; Attendance: 16,000; Referee: Kratzenberg

29 November 1931 14	Eintracht Frankfurt	4–0	FC Hanau 93	Frankfurt, Germany
	Möbs; Ehmer	(Report)		Stadium: Riederwaldstadion; Attendance: 3,000; Referee: Schlosser

6 December 1931 15	Germania Bieber	0–4	Eintracht Frankfurt	Bieber, Germany
		(Report)	Möbs 20'; Ehmer 28', 57', 74'	Stadium: Sportplatz am Waldhof; Attendance: 4,000; Referee: Walter

13 December 1931 16	FSV Heusenstamm	0–6	Eintracht Frankfurt
		(Report)	Möbs; Kellerhoff	Attendance: 800; Referee: Scheel

25 December 1931 17	FSV Frankfurt	0–6	Eintracht Frankfurt	Frankfurt, Germany
		(Report)	Möbs; Ehmer; Trumpler; Schaller	Stadium: Waldstadion; Attendance: 15,000; Referee: Maul

1 January 1932 18	Eintracht Frankfurt	9–2	VfL Neu-Isenburg	Frankfurt, Germany
	Ehmer 1'; Kellerhoff; Schaller	(Report)	Goal	Stadium: Riederwaldstadion; Attendance: 3,000; Referee: Keller

3 January 1932 19	Eintracht Frankfurt	3–2	Union Niederrad	Frankfurt, Germany
	Ehmer; Trumpler; Pfeiffer	(Report)	Leichter	Stadium: Riederwaldstadion; Attendance: 3,000; Referee: Müller

10 January 1932 20	Eintracht Frankfurt	0–0	Kickers Offenbach	Frankfurt, Germany
		(Report)	Maid (red card)	Stadium: Riederwaldstadion; Attendance: 4,000; Referee: Bremser

==== League table ====
Position	Team	Played	Goals	Points
1.	Eintracht Frankfurt (C)	20	81-18	35-5
2.	FSV Frankfurt	20	50-30	28-12
3.	Rot-Weiss Frankfurt	20	58-30	25-15
4.	Union Niederrad	20	69-39	25-15
5.	Kickers Offenbach	20	40-31	25-15
6.	VfL Neu-Isenburg (P)	20	42-46	18-22
7.	Germania Bieber	20	36-52	16-24
8.	FC Hanau 93	20	35-56	16-24
9.	FSV Heusenstamm (P)	20	23-51	14-26
10.	SpVgg Griesheim 02 (P)	20	33-59	12-28
11.	VfL Germania 1894 (P)	20	25-80	6-34

	Qualification for the 1932 German football championship round
	Relegated to the second tier
(C)	1930–31 Bezirksliga Main-Hessen champions
(P)	Promoted from the second tier

=== South German Championship round, North West division ===
==== Fixtures and results ====
20 December 1931 1	Mainz 05	1–4	Eintracht Frankfurt
	Posselmann 75'	(Report)	Schaller 4'; Möbs 19' (pen.), 52', 60'	Attendance: 12,000; Referee: Götzl

17 January 1932 2	Eintracht Frankfurt	3–0	SV Waldhof	Frankfurt, Germany
	Ehmer 15', 20', 78'	(Report)		Stadium: Waldstadion; Attendance: 10,000; Referee: Unverferth

24 January 1932 3	Eintracht Frankfurt	3–3	FV Saarbrücken	Frankfurt, Germany
	Ehmer; Schaller 84'	(Report)	Schmidt; Benzmüller	Stadium: Waldstadion; Attendance: 5,000; Referee: Schneider

31 January 1932 4	FK Pirmasens	1–2	Eintracht Frankfurt	Pirmasens, Germany
	Hergert 50' (pen.)	(Report)	Ehmer 14', 83'	Attendance: 10,000; Referee: Fritz

7 February 1932 5	Eintracht Frankfurt	4–2	Wormatia Worms	Frankfurt, Germany
	Möbs 30' 67'; Ehmer 64'	(Report)	Winkler 59', 86'	Stadium: Waldstadion; Attendance: 4,000; Referee: Glaser

14 February 1932 6	VfL Neckarau	2–0	Eintracht Frankfurt	Mannheim, Germany
	Zellner 52'; Zeilfelder 88'	(Report)		Attendance: 10,000; Referee: Fuchs

21 February 1932 7	Eintracht Frankfurt	1–0	FSV Frankfurt	Frankfurt, Germany
	Karl Ehmer 29'	(Report)		Stadium: Waldstadion; Attendance: 20,000; Referee: Sackenreuther

6 March 1932 8	FV Saarbrücken	0–0	Eintracht Frankfurt	Saarbrücken, Germany
		(Report)		Stadium: Ludwigsparkstadion; Attendance: 3,500

13 March 1932 9	SV Waldhof	2–3	Eintracht Frankfurt	Mannheim, Germany
	Weidinger	(Report)	Schaller; Ehmer pen'	Attendance: 12,000; Referee: Müller

20 March 1932 10	Eintracht Frankfurt	2–1	Mainz 05
	Ehmer 4'; Schaller 27'	(Report)	Engel 2'	Attendance: 4,000; Referee: Engel

3 April 1932 11	FSV Frankfurt	2–0	Eintracht Frankfurt	Frankfurt, Germany
	Knapp 4'; Sadtler 18'	(Report)		Stadium: Waldstadion; Attendance: 20,000; Referee: Maul

10 April 1932 12	Eintracht Frankfurt	3–1	VfL Neckarau	Frankfurt, Germany
	Ehmer 8', 17' (pen.); Dietrich 58'	(Report)	Schmitt 44'	Stadium: Waldstadion; Attendance: 4,500; Referee: Wacker

17 April 1932 13	Wormatia Worms	5–3	Eintracht Frankfurt	Worms
	Winkler 15' 24'; Müller	(Report)	Ehmer 4'; Leis pen.'; Dietrich	Stadium: Wormatia-Stadion; Attendance: 7,000; Referee: Götzl

24 April 1932 14	Eintracht Frankfurt	1–0	FK Pirmasens	Frankfurt, Germany
	Leis 39'	(Report)		Stadium: Riederwaldstadion; Attendance: 10,000; Referee: Unverferth

Position	Team	Played	Goals	Points
1.	Eintracht Frankfurt	14	29-20	20-8
2.	FSV Frankfurt	14	31-17	19-9
3.	Wormatia Worms	14	36-25	17-11
4.	VfL Neckarau	14	28-26	16-12
5.	FV Saarbrücken	14	28-34	12-16
6.	FK Pirmasens	14	23-34	10-18
7.	SV Waldhof	14	27-31	9-19
8.	Mainz 05	14	20-35	9-19

Qualification for the 1932 German football championship round

==== South German Championship final match ====
1 May 1932	Eintracht Frankfurt	2–0	Bayern Munich	Stuttgart, Germany
	Dietrich 5', 35'	(Report)		Stadium: Platz des VfB; Attendance: 20,000; Referee: Glöckler

=== German Championship knockout stage ===
8 May 1932 Round of 16	Hindenburg Allenstein	0–6	Eintracht Frankfurt	Königsberg, Germany
		(Report)	Ehmer 1', 24', 35', 53'; Dietrich 49'	Stadium: VfB-Platz; Attendance: 6,000; Referee: Dawzinsky

22 May 1932 Quarter-final	Eintracht Frankfurt	3–1	Tennis Borussia Berlin	Frankfurt, Germany
	Ehmer 8'; Schaller 46'; Stubb 88' (pen.)	(Report)	Handschuhmacher 41'	Stadium: Waldstadion; Attendance: 22,000; Referee: Dondelinger

29 May 1932 Semi-final	Eintracht Frankfurt	2–1	Schalke 04	Dresden, Germany
	Ehmer 9', 65'	(Report)	Rothardt 35'	Stadium: Stadion am Ostragehege des Dresdner SC; Attendance: 18,000; Referee: Flachowski

==== Final ====
12 June 1932

Bayern Munich	2–0	Eintracht Frankfurt
Rohr 36' (pen.); Krumm 75'	Report

Städtisches Stadion, Nuremberg
Attendance: 55,000
Referee: Alfred Birlem (Berlin)

== Squad ==
=== Squad and statistics ===
No.	Pos	Nat	Player	Total		League		South German championship round		All German championship round	
No.	Pos	Nat	Player	Apps	Goals	Apps	Goals	Apps	Goals	Apps	Goals
	GK		Pfister	4	0	0	0	4	0	0	0
	GK	(Germany) GER	Ludwig Schmitt	35	0	20	0	11	0	4	0
	DF	(Germany) GER	Willi Pfeiffer	21	1	14	1	7	0	0	0
	DF	(Germany) GER	Franz Schütz	28	0	16	0	8	0	4	0
	DF	(Germany) GER	Hans Stubb	24	1	9	0	11	0	4	1
	MF	(Germany) GER	Rudolf Gramlich	33	2	17	2	12	0	4	0
	MF	(Germany) GER	Bernhard Leis	37	3	19	1	14	2	4	0
	MF	(Germany) GER	Hugo Mantel	21	0	8	0	9	0	4	0
	MF	(Germany) GER	Franz Sobanski	8	0	1	0	6	0	1	0
	FW	(Germany) GER	Heinz Berger	1	0	1	0	0	0	0	0
	FW	(Switzerland) SUI	Walter Dietrich	36	8	19	2	13	4	4	2
	FW	(Germany) GER	Karl Ehmer	38	55	19	34	15	14	4	7
	FW	(Germany) GER	Walter Gerth	1	0	0	0	1	0	0	0
	FW		Kampschmieder	1	0	0	0	1	0	0	0
	FW	(Germany) GER	Bernhard Kellerhoff	30	5	18	5	12	0	0	0
	FW	(Germany) GER	Joseph Kron	19	1	12	1	7	0	0	0
	FW	(Germany) GER	August Möbs	35	28	19	22	12	6	4	0
	FW	(Germany) GER	Fritz Schaller	31	13	18	8	10	4	3	1
	FW	(Germany) GER	Theodor Trumpler	26	4	10	4	12	0	4	0

=== Transfers ===
In:

No.	Pos.	Nation	Player
—	FW	(Germany) GER	Heinz Berger (from Eintracht Frankfurt Academy)
—	FW	(Germany) GER	Walter Gerth (from unknown)
—	GK	(Germany) GER	Pfister (from unknown)
—	MF	(Germany) GER	Franz Sobanski (from Berliner SV 92)

Out:

No.	Pos.	Nation	Player
—	MF	(Germany) GER	Bruno Goldammer (retired)

== See also ==
- 1932 German football championship

== Sources ==
- Matheja, Ulrich (2011). Unsere Eintracht - Eintracht Frankfurt - Die Chronik. Die Werkstatt. ISBN 978-3-89533-750-5.
