= 1930–31 Eintracht Frankfurt season =

Eintracht Frankfurt
1930–31 season
- Chairman: Egon Graf von Beroldingen
- Manager: Paul Oßwald
- Bezirksliga Main-Hessen, Main division: 1st / Champions
- South German Championship round: 2nd / Runners-Up
- German Championship knockout stage: Quarter-final
- Domestic cup competition: Not established yet
- Top goalscorer: League: Karl Ehmer (15); All: Karl Ehmer (27)
- Highest home attendance: 15,000 16 November 1930 v FSV Frankfurt (league)
- Lowest home attendance: 2,000 2 November 1930 v SpVgg Fechenheim (league)
- Average home league attendance: 7,286

The 1930–31 Eintracht Frankfurt season was the 31st season in the club's football history. In 1930–31 the club played in the Bezirksliga Main-Hessen (Main division), then one of many top tiers of German football. It was the club's 4th season in the Bezirksliga Main-Hessen (Main division).

The season ended up with Eintracht finishing the South German championship as runners-up, but later losing to Hamburger SV in the quarter-final in the run for the German championship knockout stage.

== Matches ==
=== Legend ===
Win Draw Loss Postponed

=== Friendlies ===
2 August 1930	Dresdner SC (Germany)	1–3	(Germany) Eintracht Frankfurt	Dresden, Germany
	Richard	Report	Möbs; Kellerhoff	Attendance: 8,000

3 August 1930	VfB Leipzig (Germany)	3–2	(Germany) Eintracht Frankfurt	Germany
	Schrepper 8'; Paulsen 56'; Bödecker	Report	Schaller 61'; Trumpler 67'	Attendance: 3,000

10 August 1930	FC Schalke 04 (Germany)	5–0	(Germany) Eintracht Frankfurt	Germany
	Kuzorra; Rothard; Tibulski; Szepan	Report		Attendance: 15,000

17 August 1930	Eintracht Frankfurt (Germany)	6–0	(Germany) ASV Nürnberg	Frankfurt, Germany
	Goldammer; Kellerhoff; Möbs; Ehmer 70'	Report		Stadium: Riederwaldstadion

31 August 1930	Sparta Prague (Czechoslovakia)	3–2	(Germany) Eintracht Frankfurt	Prague, Czechoslovakia
	Košťálek 23'; Braine 75'; Silný 80'	Report	Ehmer 33'; Möbs	Attendance: 6,000

21 December 1930	Jahn Regensburg (Germany)	0–5	(Germany) Eintracht Frankfurt	Regensburg, Germany
		Report

28 December 1930	Arminia Bielefeld (Germany)	0–6	(Germany) Eintracht Frankfurt	Bielefeld, Germany
		Report	Dietrich; Möbs; Ehmer

6 April 1931	Eintracht Frankfurt (Germany)	2–2	Admira Vienna (Austria)	Frankfurt, Germany
	Kampschmieder 65'; Ehmer 80' (pen.)	Report	Schall 55'; Vogl 75'	Attendance: 4,000; Referee: Gümpler

24 May 1931	FV Lörrach (Germany)	1–6	Eintracht Frankfurt	Lörrach, Germany
	Goal	Report	Goal

25 May 1931	FC Zürich (Switzerland)	2–5	Eintracht Frankfurt	Zurich, Switzerland
	Goal	Report	Goal

17 June 1931	Rot-Weiss Frankfurt (Germany)	3–0	Eintracht Frankfurt	Frankfurt, Germany
	Dietermann	Report

21 June 1931	Eintracht Frankfurt (Germany)	9–1	FSV Frankfurt	Frankfurt, Germany
	Kron 5' 11'; Kellerhoff; Ehmer 25' 50'; Möbs 44'	Report	Mihm	Stadium: Riederwaldstadion; Attendance: 12,000; Referee: Best

=== Bezirksliga Main-Hessen (Main division) ===
==== League fixtures and results ====
24 August 1930 1	Eintracht Frankfurt	3–0	Union Niederrad	Frankfurt, Germany
	Ehmer 7'; Schaller 36', 82'	Report		Stadium: Riederwaldstadion; Attendance: 8,000; Referee: Schuch

7 September 1930 2	SpVgg Fechenheim	0–4	Eintracht Frankfurt	Frankfurt, Germany
		Report	Dietrich 3', 70'; Gehrmann 35' (o.g.); Schaller 80'	Attendance: 4,000; Referee: Albrecht

14 September 1930 3	Eintracht Frankfurt	4–0	FC Hanau 93	Frankfurt, Germany
	Möbs 8'; Dietrich 10'; Ehmer; Kellerhoff	Report		Stadium: Riederwaldstadion; Attendance: 6,000; Referee: Dölker

21 September 1930 4	Eintracht Frankfurt	11–0	Germania Bieber	Frankfurt, Germany
	Schaller; Dietrich; Ehmer; Möbs; Kellerhoff	Report		Stadium: Riederwaldstadion; Attendance: 3,000; Referee: Freiländer

28 September 1930 5	Eintracht Frankfurt	2–2	Kickers Offenbach	Frankfurt, Germany
	Ehmer (pen.); Schaller	Report	(pen.); Belle	Stadium: Riederwaldstadion; Attendance: 10,000; Referee: Walter

5 October 1930 6	FSV Frankfurt	1–3	Eintracht Frankfurt	Frankfurt, Germany
	Bretteville 77'	Report	Ehmer 20', 65'; Schaller 67'	Stadium: Waldstadion; Attendance: 12,000; Referee: Müller

12 October 1930 7	Rot-Weiss Frankfurt	3–6	Eintracht Frankfurt
	Kraushaar; Ditzel; Krauß I	Report	Leis 20'; Kellerhoff 24'; Möbs; Schaller; Stubb	Attendance: 10,000; Referee: Glöckner

20 October 1929 8	Union Niederrad	1–3	Eintracht Frankfurt	Frankfurt, Germany
	Leichter 18'	Report	Möbs 20'; Kellerhoff 52'; Ehmer 88'	Attendance: 5,000

26 October 1930 9	Eintracht Frankfurt	1–2	Rot-Weiss Frankfurt	Germany
	Leis	Report	Kraus I; Dietzel 80'	Attendance: 7,000; Referee: Maul

2 November 1930 10	Eintracht Frankfurt	6–1	SpVgg Fechenheim	Frankfurt, Germany
	Ehmer; Schaller	Report	Ruhr	Stadium: Riederwaldstadion; Attendance: 2,000; Referee: Lukassowitz

9 November 1930 11	FC Hanau 93	2–2	Eintracht Frankfurt	Germany
	Philippi; Hoock	Report	Möbs; Leis 75'	Attendance: 4,000

16 November 1930 12	Eintracht Frankfurt	2–0	FSV Frankfurt	Frankfurt, Germany
	Dietrich 9'; Möbs 84'	Report		Stadium: Riederwaldstadion; Attendance: 15,000; Referee: Sackenreuther

30 November 1930 13	Kickers Offenbach	0–3	Eintracht Frankfurt	Bieber, Germany
		Report	Kron 34'; Ehmer 65', 70'	Stadium: Stadion am Bieberer Berg; Attendance: 8,000; Referee: Jünger

7 December 1930 14	Germania Bieber	1–1	Eintracht Frankfurt	Bieber, Germany
	Kühnle (pen.)	Report	Möbs	Attendance: 1,500; Referee: Bremser

==== League table ====
Position	Team	Played	Goals	Points
1.	Eintracht Frankfurt (C)	14	51-13	23-5
2.	Rot-Weiss Frankfurt	14	26-17	18-10
3.	Union Niederrad	14	41-22	17-11
4.	Kickers Offenbach	14	29-21	16-12
5.	FSV Frankfurt	14	19-16	14-14
6.	FC Hanau 93	14	21-35	11-17
7.	Germania Bieber	14	14-34	11-17
8.	SpVgg Fechenheim (P)	14	14-58	2-26

	Qualification for the 1930 German football championship round
	Relegated to the second tier
(C)	1929–30 Bezirksliga Main-Hessen champions
(P)	Promoted from the second tier

==== Results summary ====
Overall								Home						Away					
Pld	W	D	L	GF	GA	GD	Pts	W	D	L	GF	GA	GD	W	D	L	GF	GA	GD
14	11	2	1	51	13	+38	24	6	0	1	29	5	+24	5	2	0	22	8	+14

Source: Bundesliga

==== Results by round ====
Round	1	2	3	4	5	6	7	8	9	10	11	12	13	14
Ground	H	A	H	H	H	A	A	A	H	H	A	H	A	H
Result	W	W	W	W	D	W	W	W	L	W	D	W	W	D
Position	2	2	1	1	1	1	1	1	1	1	1	1	1	1

Source: kicker.de
A = Away; H = Home; W = Win; D = Draw; L = Loss

=== South German Championship round ===
==== League fixtures and results ====
4 January 1931 1	Union Böckingen	2–3	Eintracht Frankfurt	Böckingen, Germany
	Walter I; Sammet	Report	Dietrich 5'; Möbs; Ehmer (pen.)	Stadium: Stadion am See; Attendance: 3,000; Referee: Maul

18 January 1931 2	SpVgg Fürth	2–1	Eintracht Frankfurt	Fürth, Germany
	Franz 35'; Faust 65'	Report	Schaller	Stadium: Sportpark Ronhof; Attendance: 6,000; Referee: List

1 February 1931 3	Eintracht Frankfurt	4–1	Karlsruher FV	Frankfurt, Germany
	Schaller 10' 35'; Kellerhoff 60'	Report	Nagel (pen.)	Stadium: Waldstadion; Attendance: 6,000; Referee: Weyrich

8 February 1931 4	Wormatia Worms	2–3	Eintracht Frankfurt	Worms, Germany
	Mannertz; Debusi 58'	Report	Ehmer 4'; Schaller 9'; Möbs 76'	Stadium: Wormatia-Stadion; Attendance: 4,000; Referee: Gröschel

15 February 1931 5	FK Pirmasens	3–6	Eintracht Frankfurt	Pirmasens, Germany
	Hergert (pen.); Bossert	Report	Möbs; Ehmer; Schaller; Trumpler	Attendance: 4,000; Referee: Schmitt

23 February 1931 Suspended after 12 minutes of play due to unplayable pitch conditions	Eintracht Frankfurt	0–0	Bayern Munich	Frankfurt, Germany
		Report		Stadium: Waldstadion; Attendance: 15,000; Referee: Walter

1 March 1931 6	Eintracht Frankfurt	4–1	Union Böckingen	Frankfurt, Germany
	Möbs 37'; Ehmer; Gramlich; Leis	Report	Pfisterer	Stadium: Riederwaldstadion; Attendance: 12,000; Referee: Becker

8 March 1931 7	SV Waldhof	2–1	Eintracht Frankfurt	Mannheim, Germany
	Weidinger 11', 70'	Report	Möbs 29'	Attendance: 8,000; Referee: Keller

22 March 1931 8	Eintracht Frankfurt	4–3	FK Pirmasens	Frankfurt, Germany
	Ehmer 26'; Schaller; Trumpler	Report	Hergert; Michel; Bossert	Stadium: Waldstadion; Attendance: 10,000; Referee: Sackenreuther

29 March 1931 9	Eintracht Frankfurt	0–0	SpVgg Fürth	Frankfurt, Germany
		Report		Stadium: Waldstadion; Attendance: 36,000; Referee: Maier

12 April 1931 10	Karlsruher FV	0–0	Eintracht Frankfurt	Karlsruhe, Germany
		Report		Attendance: 7,000; Referee: Höhn

19 April 1931 11	Eintracht Frankfurt	1–0	SV Waldhof	Frankfurt, Germany
	Ehmer 30'	Report		Stadium: Riederwaldstadion; Attendance: 10,000; Referee: Bachmann

26 April 1931 12	Bayern Munich	2–1	Eintracht Frankfurt	Munich, Germany
	Welker 2'; Haringer 5' (pen.)	Report	Möbs	Stadium: Heinrich-Zisch-Stadion; Attendance: 18,000; Referee: Fritz

3 May 1931 13	Eintracht Frankfurt	2–1	Bayern Munich	Frankfurt, Germany
	Ehmer; Kellerhoff 80'	Report	Bergmaier 30'	Stadium: Waldstadion; Attendance: 30,000; Referee: Walter

10 May 1931 14	Eintracht Frankfurt	2–1	Wormatia Worms	Germany
	Schaller 32'; Möbs 55'	Report	Mannertz 40'	Attendance: 5,000; Referee: Fuchs

==== League table ====
Position	Team	Played	Goals	Points
1.	SpVgg Fürth	14	36-17	21-7
2.	Eintracht Frankfurt	14	32-20	20-8
3.	Bayern Munich	14	44-25	19-9
4.	SV Waldhof	14	33-31	13-15
5.	Karlsruher FV	14	26-29	13-15
6.	FK Pirmasens	14	30-42	10-18
7.	Wormatia Worms	14	32-41	9-19
8.	Union Böckingen	14	25-53	7-21

Qualification for the 1931 German championship round

==== Results summary ====
Overall								Home						Away					
Pld	W	D	L	GF	GA	GD	Pts	W	D	L	GF	GA	GD	W	D	L	GF	GA	GD
14	9	2	3	32	20	+12	20	6	1	0	17	7	+10	3	1	3	15	13	+2

Source: Bundesliga

==== Results by round ====
Round	1	2	3	4	5	6	7	8	9	10	11	12	13	14
Ground	A	A	H	A	A	H	A	H	H	A	H	A	H	H
Result	W	L	W	W	W	W	L	W	D	D	W	L	W	W
Position	1	5	2	2	2	2	2	2	2	2	2	3	2	2

Source: kicker.de
A = Away; H = Home; W = Win; D = Draw; L = Loss

=== German Championship knockout stage ===
14 May 1931 Round of 16	Fortuna Düsseldorf	2–3 (a.e.t.)	Eintracht Frankfurt	Düsseldorf, Germany
	Hochgesang 17' (pen.); Köhler	Report	Ehmer 29', 19'; Bornefeld (o.g.)	Stadium: Rheinstadion; Attendance: 35,000; Referee: Fuchs

17 May 1931 Quarter-final	Hamburger SV	2–0	Eintracht Frankfurt	Altona, Germany
	Wollers 70'	Report		Stadium: Altonaer Stadion; Attendance: 15,000; Referee: Jung

== Squad ==
=== Squad and statistics ===
No.	Pos	Nat	Player	Total		League		South German championship round		All German championship round	
No.	Pos	Nat	Player	Apps	Goals	Apps	Goals	Apps	Goals	Apps	Goals
	GK	(Germany) GER	Ludwig Schmitt	30	0	14	0	14	0	2	0
	DF	(Germany) GER	Willi Pfeiffer	9	0	6	0	3	0	0	0
	DF	(Germany) GER	Franz Schütz	26	0	13	0	12	0	1	0
	DF	(Germany) GER	Hans Stubb	22	1	9	1	11	0	2	0
	MF	(Germany) GER	Bruno Goldammer	15	0	10	0	4	0	1	0
	MF	(Germany) GER	Rudolf Gramlich	23	1	13	0	8	1	2	0
	MF	(Germany) GER	Joseph Kron	13	1	3	1	8	0	2	0
	MF	(Germany) GER	Bernhard Leis	25	4	9	3	14	1	2	0
	MF	(Germany) GER	Hugo Mantel	25	0	12	0	11	0	2	0
	FW	(Switzerland) SUI	Walter Dietrich	17	7	14	6	3	1	0	0
	FW	(Germany) GER	Karl Ehmer	28	27	12	15	14	10	2	2
	FW	(Germany) GER	Kampschmieder	1	0	0	0	1	0	0	0
	FW	(Germany) GER	Bernhard Kellerhoff	27	6	11	4	14	2	2	0
	FW	(Germany) GER	August Möbs	28	15	14	8	12	7	2	0
	FW	(Germany) GER	Fritz Schaller	30	20	14	12	14	8	2	0
	FW	(Germany) GER	Theodor Trumpler	11	2	0	0	11	2	0	0

=== Transfers ===
In:

No.	Pos.	Nation	Player
—	FW	GER	Kampschmieder (from unknown)
—	FW	GER	August Möbs (from VfB Friedberg)
—	GK	GER	Ludwig Schmitt (from BSC Oberrad)

Out:

No.	Pos.	Nation	Player
—	FW	GER	Karl Döpfer (to unknown)
—	GK	GER	Hausmann (to unknown)
—	DF	GER	Krämer (to unknown)
—	MF	GER	Fritz Kübert (retired)
—	GK	GER	Schüler (to unknown)
—	GK	GER	Willy Trumpp (retired)
—	FW	GER	Walsch (to unknown)

== See also ==
- 1931 German football championship

== Sources ==
- Matheja, Ulrich (2011). Unsere Eintracht - Eintracht Frankfurt - Die Chronik. Die Werkstatt. ISBN 978-3-89533-750-5.
