= 1932 German football championship final =

1932 German championship final
Endspiel um die Deutsche Fußballmeisterschaft
- Event: 1932 German football championship
Bayern München	Eintracht Frankfurt
2	0
- Date: 12 June 1932
- Venue: Städtisches Stadion, Nuremberg
- Referee: Alfred Birlem (Berlin)
- Attendance: 55,000

The 1932 German football championship final decided the winner of the 1932 German football championship, the 25th of the German football championship, a knockout football cup competition contested by the regional league winners to determine the national champions. It was played on 12 June 1932 at the Städtisches Stadion in Nuremberg. Bayern München won the match 2–0 against Eintracht Frankfurt, to claim their 1st German title.

== Route to the final ==
The German football championship began with 16 teams in a single-elimination knockout competition. There were a total of three rounds leading up to the final. Teams were drawn against each other, and the winner after 90 minutes would advance. If still tied, extra time, and if necessary a replay were used to determine the winner.

Note: In all results below, the score of the finalist is given first (H: home; A: away; N: neutral).

Bayern München		Round	Eintracht Frankfurt
Opponent	Result	1932 German football championship	Opponent	Result
Minerva Berlin (H)	4–2	Round of 16	Hindenburg Allenstein (N)	6–0
PSV Chemnitz (N)	3–2	Quarter-finals	Tennis Borussia Berlin (H)	3–1
1. FC Nürnberg (N)	2–0	Semi-finals	Schalke 04 (N)	2–1

== Match ==
=== Details ===
12 June 1932
16:00 CET

Bayern München	2–0	Eintracht Frankfurt
Rohr 36' (pen.); Krumm 75'	Report

Städtisches Stadion, Nuremberg
Attendance: 55,000
Referee: Alfred Birlem (Berlin)

Bayern München	Eintracht Frankfurt

GK	(Weimar Republic) Josef Lechler
RB	(Weimar Republic) Sigmund Haringer
LB	(Weimar Republic) Conrad Heidkamp (c)
RH	(Weimar Republic) Robert Breindl
CH	(Weimar Republic) Ludwig Goldbrunner
LH	(Weimar Republic) Ernst Nagelschmitz
OR	(Weimar Republic) Josef Bergmaier
IR	(Weimar Republic) Franz Krumm
CF	(Weimar Republic) Oskar Rohr
IL	(Weimar Republic) Hans Schmid
OL	(Weimar Republic) Hans Welker
Manager:
(Austria) Richard Dombi

GK	(Weimar Republic) Ludwig Schmitt
RB	(Weimar Republic) Franz Schütz (c)
LB	(Weimar Republic) Hans Stubb
RH	(Weimar Republic) Rudolf Gramlich
CH	(Weimar Republic) Bernhard Leis
LH	(Weimar Republic) Hugo Mantel
OR	(Weimar Republic) Fritz Schaller
IR	(Weimar Republic) Theodor Trumpler
CF	(Weimar Republic) Karl Ehmer
IL	(Switzerland) Walter Dietrich
OL	(Weimar Republic) August Möbs
Manager:
(Weimar Republic) Paul Oßwald

Match rules

- 90 minutes
- 30 minutes of extra time if necessary (replay if scores still level)
- No substitutions
