= List of Eintracht Frankfurt managers =

This is a list of the people to manage Eintracht Frankfurt. Eintracht did not officially appoint a manager until 1919 when the late board member Albert Sohn coached the team. In 1921 the first full-time manager, Dori Kürschner, was appointed.

Paul Oßwald was in charge as manager in three stints, two before World War II and one after. Oßwald is also the longest serving manager in club history with 6 years in a single stint and accumulated 14 years overall.

Major national or and international trophy winning managers include Paul Oßwald (German championship in 1958–59), Elek Schwartz (Intertoto Cup in 1966–67), Dietrich Weise (DFB-Pokal in 1973–74 and 1974–75), Friedel Rausch (UEFA Cup in 1979–80), Lothar Buchmann (DFB-Pokal in 1980–81), Karl-Heinz Feldkamp (DFB-Pokal in 1987–88), Niko Kovač (DFB-Pokal in 2017–18) and Oliver Glasner (Europa League in 2021–22).

== List ==
=== Managers ===
As of 1 June 2026

== Managers ==
This list does not include caretaker managers or those who managed in a temporary capacity

Information correct as of 28 January 2026. Only competitive matches are counted

Picture	Name	Nationality	From	To	Matches	Won	Drawn	Lost	Win%	Honours	Notes
	Albert Sohn	Germany	1919	1919							
	Izidor Kürschner	Hungary	July 1921	May 1922	14	13	0	1	92.86	Kreisliga Nordmain champions (1921–22)	
	Maurice Parry	Wales	April 1925	March 1926	28	10	7	11	35.71		
	Walter Dietrich / Friedel Egly	Switzerland / Germany	March 1926	September 1927	35	24	6	5	68.57	Bezirksliga Main runners-up (1926–27)	
	Gustav Wieser	Austria	October 1927	July 1928	28	20	4	4	71.43	Bezirksliga Main-Hessen champions (1927–28)	
Paul Oßwald (on the right) with fellow coach Herbert Binkert in 1987	Paul Oßwald	Germany	August 1928	30 August 1933	166	114	26	26	68.67	Bezirksliga Main-Hessen champions (1928–29); Bezirksliga Main-Hessen champions (1929–30); Southern German champions (1929–30); Bezirksliga Main-Hessen champions (1930–31); Southern German championship runners-up (1930–31); Bezirksliga Main-Hessen champions (1931–32); Southern German champions (1931–32); German championship runners-up (1931–32); Bezirksliga Main-Hessen champions (1932–33)	
	Willi Spreng	Germany	September 1933	May 1935	42	16	12	14	38.10		
Paul Oßwald (on the right) with fellow coach Herbert Binkert in 1987	Paul Oßwald	Germany	August 1935	June 1938	67	45	9	13	67.16	Gauliga Südwest/Mainhessen runners-up (1936–37); Gauliga Südwest/Mainhessen champions (1937–38)	
	Otto Boer	Germany	January 1939	June 1939	10	5	1	4	50.00		
	Péter Szabó	Hungary	August 1939	31 May 1941	37	25	4	8	67.57		
	Willi Lindner	Germany	July 1941	July 1942	16	12	1	3	75.00		
	Péter Szabó	Hungary	1942	1943							
	Emil Melcher	Germany	January 1946	June 1947	54	21	18	15	38.89		
	Willi Treml	Germany	June 1947	January 1948	24	11	5	8	45.83		
	Bernhard Kellerhoff	Germany	February 1948	December 1948	32	12	9	11	37.50		
	Walter Hollstein	Germany	January 1949	June 1950	62	19	16	27	30.65		
	Kurt Windmann	Germany	August 1950	July 1956	206	97	44	65	47.09	Oberliga Süd champions (1952–53); Oberliga Süd runners-up (1953–54)	
	Adolf Patek	Austria	July 1956	30 April 1958	64	33	14	17	51.56		
Paul Oßwald (on the right) with fellow coach Herbert Binkert in 1987	Paul Oßwald	Germany	1 May 1958	16 April 1964	231	142	42	47	61.47	Oberliga Süd champions (1958–59); German champions (1958–59); European Cup runners-up (1959–60); Oberliga Süd runners-up (1960–61); Oberliga Süd runners-up (1961–62)	
	Ivica Horvat	Yugoslavia	17 April 1964	30 June 1965	43	19	7	17	44.19	DFB-Pokal runners-up (1963–64)	
Elek Schwartz in 1972	Elek Schwartz	Romania	1 July 1965	30 June 1968	120	54	26	40	45.00	Intertoto Cup champions (1966–67)	
Erich Ribbeck in 1980	Erich Ribbeck	Germany	1 July 1968	30 June 1973	203	83	41	79	40.89		
	Dietrich Weise	Germany	1 July 1973	12 June 1976	130	69	29	32	53.08	DFB-Pokal champions (1973–74); DFB-Pokal champions (1974–75)	
	Hans-Dieter Roos	Germany	1 July 1976	8 November 1976	14	5	1	8	35.71		
Gyula Lóránt in 1953	Gyula Lóránt	Hungary	9 November 1976	1 December 1977	51	30	11	10	58.82		
Dettmar Cramer (on the right) in 1964	Dettmar Cramer	Germany	9 December 1977	30 June 1978	19	9	2	8	47.37		
	Otto Knefler	Germany	1 July 1978	3 November 1978	12	8	1	3	66.67		
Friedel Rausch in 1979	Friedel Rausch	Germany	8 January 1979	30 June 1980	70	33	8	29	47.14	UEFA Cup champions (1979–80)	
Lothar Buchmann in 2011	Lothar Buchmann	Germany	1 July 1980	30 June 1982	88	43	15	30	48.86	DFB-Pokal champions (1980–81)	
	Helmut Senekowitsch	Austria	1 July 1982	17 September 1982	6	1	0	5	16.67		
Branko Zebec in 1953	Branko Zebec	Yugoslavia	19 September 1982	17 October 1983	39	12	8	19	30.77		
	Dietrich Weise	Germany	30 October 1983	3 December 1986	111	30	42	39	27.03		
	Timo Zahnleiter	Germany	3 December 1986	30 June 1987	19	4	2	13	21.05		
	Karl-Heinz Feldkamp	Germany	1 July 1987	14 September 1988	45	16	12	17	35.56	DFB-Pokal champions (1987–88)	
	Pál Csernai	Hungary	15 September 1988	12 December 1988	14	6	2	6	42.86		
	Jörg Berger	Germany	18 December 1988	13 April 1991	89	34	30	25	38.20	Relegation/Promotion play-off winners (1988–89)	
Dragoslav Stepanović in 2005	Dragoslav Stepanović	FR Yugoslavia	14 April 1991	30 March 1993	88	43	28	17	48.86		
	Horst Heese	Germany	31 March 1993	30 June 1993	11	4	4	3	36.36		
	Klaus Toppmöller	Germany	1 July 1993	10 April 1994	40	19	7	14	47.50		
Jupp Heynckes in 2011	Jupp Heynckes	Germany	1 July 1994	2 April 1995	34	12	10	12	35.29		
Charly Körbel in 2006	Charly Körbel	Germany	2 April 1995	30 March 1996	42	15	10	17	35.71		
Dragoslav Stepanović in 2005	Dragoslav Stepanović	FR Yugoslavia	30 March 1996	7 December 1996	28	7	7	14	25.00		
	Horst Ehrmantraut	Germany	18 December 1996	8 December 1998	72	32	22	18	44.44	2. Bundesliga champions (1997–98)	
Reinhold Fanz in 2008	Reinhold Fanz	Germany	22 December 1998	18 April 1999	9	1	3	5	11.11		
	Jörg Berger	Germany	19 April 1999	19 December 1999	26	8	4	14	30.77		
Felix Magath in 2006	Felix Magath	Germany	27 December 1999	29 January 2001	37	15	5	17	40.54		
Friedel Rausch in 1979	Friedel Rausch	Germany	3 April 2001	30 June 2001	7	2	0	5	28.57		
Martin Andermatt (on the right) in 2008	Martin Andermatt	Switzerland	1 July 2001	8 March 2002	28	12	9	7	42.86		
	Willi Reimann	Germany	1 July 2002	27 May 2004	67	26	17	24	38.81	2. Bundesliga promotion (as 3rd) (2002–03)	
Friedhelm Funkel in 2012	Friedhelm Funkel	Germany	1 July 2004	30 June 2009	194	70	50	74	36.08	2. Bundesliga promotion (as 3rd) (2004–05); DFB-Pokal runners-up (2005–06)	
Michael Skibbe in 2007	Michael Skibbe	Germany	1 July 2009	22 March 2011	67	25	15	27	37.31		
Christoph Daum	Christoph Daum	Germany	23 March 2011	30 June 2011	7	0	3	4	0.00		
Armin Veh in 2012	Armin Veh	Germany	1 July 2011	30 June 2014	119	54	28	37	45.38	2. Bundesliga runners-up (2011–12)	
Thomas Schaaf in 2009	Thomas Schaaf	Germany	1 July 2014	26 May 2015	36	12	10	14	33.33		
Armin Veh in 2012	Armin Veh	Germany	1 July 2015	6 March 2016	27	6	9	12	22.22		
Niko Kovač in 2019	Niko Kovač	Croatia	8 March 2016	30 June 2018	91	38	20	33	41.76	Relegation/Promotion play-off winners (2015–16); DFB-Pokal runners-up (2016–17); DFB-Pokal champions (2017–18)	
Adi Hütter in 2020	Adi Hütter	Austria	1 July 2018	30 June 2021	139	66	32	41	47.48		
Oliver Glasner in 2022	Oliver Glasner	Austria	1 July 2021	30 June 2023	95	37	29	29	38.95	UEFA Europa League champions (2022–23)	
Dino Toppmöller in 2023	Dino Toppmöller	Germany	1 July 2023	17 January 2026	123	53	35	35	43.09		
Albert Riera in 2017	Albert Riera	Spain	2 February 2026	present	14	4	5	5	28.57		
Adi Hütter in 2025	Adi Hütter	Austria	1 June 2026	present	0	0	0	0	—		

=== Caretaker managers ===
As of 1 June 2026

Picture	Name	Nationality	From	To	Matches	Won	Drawn	Lost	Win%	Honours	Notes
	Wilhelm Pfeiffer	Germany	1945	November 1945	4	1	1	2	25.00		
Sepp Herberger in 1957	Sepp Herberger	Germany	December 1945	December 1945	5	0	1	4	0.00		
Jürgen Grabowski in 2005	Jürgen Grabowski	Germany	3 December 1977	7 December 1977	2	1	1	0	50.00		
	Udo Klug	Germany	11 November 1978	7 January 1979	6	3	1	2	50.00		
Jürgen Grabowski in 2005	Jürgen Grabowski	Germany	October 1983	October 1983	0	0	0	0	—		
	Klaus Mank	Germany	October 1983	October 1983	2	0	1	1	0.00		
Charly Körbel in 2006	Charly Körbel	Germany	10 April 1994	30 June 1994	4	2	1	1	50.00		
	Rudi Bommer	Germany	8 December 1996	17 December 1996	0	0	0	0	—		
Bernhard Lippert in 2009	Bernhard Lippert	Germany	8 December 1998	19 December 1998	2	0	1	1	0.00		
	Rolf Dohmen	Germany	January 2001	April 2001	8	2	3	3	25.00		
	Armin Kraaz	Germany	8 March 2002	27 May 2002	9	3	4	2	33.33		
	Dennis Schmitt	Germany	18 January 2026	present	4	0	0	4	0.00		
