= August Möbs =

German footballer

Personal information
- Full name: August Möbs
- Date of birth: 8 August 1908
- Place of birth: Friedberg, Germany
- Date of death: 4 February 1944 (aged 35)
- Place of death: Bad Vilbel, Germany

Senior career*
| Years | Team | Apps | (Gls) |
| –1930 | VfB Friedberg | | |
| 1930–1939 | Eintracht Frankfurt | 115 | (70) |
- * Club domestic league appearances and goals

August Möbs (8 August 1908 – 4 February 1944) was a German footballer.

He came to Eintracht Frankfurt from VfB Friedberg. For the Eagles Möbs scored 70 goals and reached with Eintracht the final rounds for the German championship in 1932 and 1933. In 1932 he lost with his club in the final match to Bayern Munich. On 4 February 1944, during World War II, Möbs was killed in an allied air raid on the Northern boroughs of Frankfurt.

== Honours ==
- German Championship: Runner-up 1932
- Southern German Championship: 1931–32; runner-up 1930–31
- Bezirksliga Main-Hessen: 1930–31, 1931–32; runner-up: 1932–33
