= SG Germania Wiesbaden =

- Full name: Sport Gemeinschaft Germania Wiesbaden e.V.
- Founded: 1903
- Ground: Stadion Teutonenstraße
- Chairman: Ernst-Ewald Roth
- Manager: Hartmut Freudenberg
- League: Kreisliga A Wiesbaden (IX)
- 2015–16: 12th
Home colours

SG Germania Wiesbaden is a German association football club from the city of Wiesbaden in Hesse.

The club's two most notable achievement came when it won the tier-one Kreisliga Hessen in 1920 and, almost 50 years later, reached as the Germany's second division for one season in 1966–67.

== History ==
=== 1903–1945 ===
Formed in 1903, the club became part of the A-Klasse Südmain, a regional first division in the early days of German football. The club then disappeared from the highest level and did not play in the new Nordkreis-Liga, unlike its local rival SV Wiesbaden.

After the First World War, Germania became part of the new Kreisliga Hessen, which it won in its first season, 1919–20. In the group stages of the Southern German championship, the team was knocked out by Saar 05 Saarbrücken and Pfalz Ludwigshafen. In the seasons that followed, Germania could not continue its good performance and, in 1923, the team was relegated, at a time when the Southern German football leagues were reorganised once more. Instead of the new Bezirksliga Rheinhessen-Saar, the club ended up playing in the tier-two Kreisliga Rhein-Main.

In 1926, the club came close to promotion, finishing on equal points with Alemannia Worms but then lost the decider 0–2. The year after, it experienced the same with a 0–1 loss to Olympia Worms. It did however earn promotion for a year to the Bezirksliga Main-Hessen for the 1927–28 season. After this, until the outbreak of the Second World War, the club remained a non-described side in this league. For a time, in the early 1930s, the club merged with local rival SV Wiesbaden but this did not last and by 1934, Germania was independent again.

=== 1945 to present ===
After the war, Germania entered the Bezirksklasse Wiesbaden, a local third division and, from there, earned promotion to the 2nd Amateurliga Wiesbaden in 1951. Two years later, it won the 2nd Amateurliga and earned entry into the Amateurliga Hessen, the third tier. The club had its best season in this era in 1955–56, finishing second in the Amateurliga, 14 points behind champions SpVgg Neu-Isenburg. The season after, the club was relegated, coming second-last. It became something of an elevator side, earning promotion back to the Amateurliga in 1958, 1960 and 1962, to be relegated again in 1959 and 1961. Finally, in the 1962–63 season, the club archived some stability and maintained its Amateurliga status.

The 1964–65 season proofed a turn for the better, Germania finishing fifth in the league and winning the Hesse Cup. The following season saw the club take out the Amateurliga title and earning promotion to the Regionalliga Süd.

The club's one season in the second division ended with a 17th-place finish and relegation, alongside BC Augsburg and 1. FC Pforzheim. Back in the Amateurliga, it found it hard to find its footing and, after two seasons, was relegated back to what was now the Landesliga Hessen-Süd. Back in the fourth division, the title brought another promotion, back to the Amateurliga, under manager Otto Baric in its first coaching position.

Germania archived a good fourth place back in the Amateurliga in 1970–71 but narrowly avoided relegation the season after. In its ranks in that season it had the former Yugoslavian internationals Zvezdan Čebinac and Fahrudin Jusufi. In its third season back, the club then finished distant last and was relegated once more. This time, the Gruppenliga proved much harder and in 1976, Germania experienced another drop, to the Bezirksliga Wiesbaden, tier five. From there, in 1980, the drop went even further, to the tier-six A-Klasse.

From 1982, the club improved again, winning promotion to the Bezirksliga and the year after to the Landesliga Hessen-Mitte, the Gruppenligas having been renamed to Landesligas. In this league, the club existed as a mid-table side until 1988, when a 16th place and unfavorable results in a relegation round meant a return to the Bezirksliga.

Germania became part of the new Bezirksoberliga in 1990, the new fifth tier in Hesse, and played in this league until 1998, when it dropped down to the Bezirksliga. From there, it continued its lifelong yoyo existence and moved up and down between Bezirksliga and A-Klasse, to establish itself back in the Bezirksliga from 2006 onwards.

In 2008–09, the club played in the Kreisoberliga Wiesbaden, the former Bezirksliga, winning the league and earning promotion. The following season however, the team was withdrawn from the league after 19 games of which it could only win one. Since then, the club played in the Kreisoberliga Wiesbaden (VIII) until 2015, when it was relegated to the Kreisliga A.

While local rival SV Wiesbaden has considerably lost in importance, another local club has risen through the ranks to now play in the third division, the SV Wehen Wiesbaden.

== Honours ==
The club's honours:

=== League ===
- Kreisliga Hessen (I)
  - Champions: 1920
- Kreisliga Rhein-Main (II)
  - Champions: 1925, 1926, 1927, 1929
- Amateurliga Hessen (III)
  - Champions: 1966
- 2nd Amateurliga Wiesbaden (IV)
  - Champions: 1953, 1958, 1960, 1962
- Landesliga Hessen-Süd (IV)
  - Champions: 1970
- Bezirksklasse Wiesbaden (V)
  - Champions: 1951, 1983
- Kreisoberliga Wiesbaden
  - Champions: 2009
- A-Klasse Wiesbaden (VIII)
  - Champions: 1982, 2003, 2006

=== Cup ===
- Hesse Cup
  - Winners: 1965

== Recent seasons ==
The recent season-by-season performance of the club:

Season	Division	Tier	Position
1999–00	Bezirksliga Wiesbaden	VII	9th
2000–01	Bezirksliga Wiesbaden	VII	
2001–02	Bezirksliga Wiesbaden	VII	15th ↓
2002–03	A-Klasse Wiesbaden	VIII	1st ↑
2003–04	Bezirksliga Wiesbaden	VII	5th
2004–05	Bezirksliga Wiesbaden	VII	15th ↓
2005–06	A-Klasse Wiesbaden	VIII	1st ↑
2006–07	Bezirksliga Wiesbaden	VII	2nd
2007–08	Bezirksliga Wiesbaden	VII	3rd
2008–09	Kreisoberliga Wiesbaden	VIII	1st ↑
2009–10	Gruppenliga Wiesbaden	VII	17th ↓
2010–11	Kreisoberliga Wiesbaden	VIII	11th
2011–12	Kreisoberliga Wiesbaden	VIII	3rd
2012–13	Kreisoberliga Wiesbaden	VIII	14th
2013–14	Kreisoberliga Wiesbaden	VIII	14th
2014–15	Kreisoberliga Wiesbaden	VIII	17th ↓
2015–16	Kreisliga A Wiesbaden	IX	12th
2016–17	Kreisliga A Wiesbaden	IX	

- With the introduction of the Regionalligas in 1994 and the 3. Liga in 2008 as the new third tier, below the 2. Bundesliga, all leagues below dropped one tier. Also in 2008, a large number of football leagues in Hesse were renamed, with the Oberliga Hessen becoming the Hessenliga, the Landesliga becoming the Verbandsliga, the Bezirksoberliga becoming the Gruppenliga and the Bezirksliga becoming the Kreisoberliga.

↑ Promoted	↓ Relegated
