= Hugo Mantel =

German footballer

Personal information
- Full name: Hugo Mantel
- Date of birth: 4 May 1907
- Place of birth: Bövinghausen, Dortmund, Germany
- Date of death: 11 February 1942 (aged 34)
- Place of death: Berdychiv, Ukraine
- Position: Winger

Youth career
- TSG 04 Dortmund-Bövinghausen
- TSV Duisburg 1899
- Rheinhausen

Senior career*
Years	Team	Apps	(Gls)
1925–1928	Dresdner SC		
1928–1934	Eintracht Frankfurt	72	(1)
1934	AS Ambrosiania-Inter	0	(0)
1934–1938	Eintracht Frankfurt	38	(2)
1938–1942	Frankfurter FC Germania 1894		

International career
1927–1933	Germany	5	(0)
- * Club domestic league appearances and goals

Hugo Mantel (4 May 1907 – 11 February 1942) was a German footballer.

He played for teams like Dresdner SC and Eintracht Frankfurt. He also played 5 times for Germany between 1927 and 1933. In 1934 he moved to Internazionale Milano then named Ambrosiana-Inter but failed to get a permission to play for he was a foreigner.

== Personal life ==
Mantel was born on 4 May 1907 in the Bövinghausen district of Dortmund. Serving as a Gefreiter (private) in the Wehrmacht, he died in Berdychiv during World War II on 11 February 1942 at the age of 34.

== Honours ==
Dresdner SC

- Central German championship: 1926

Eintracht Frankfurt

- German Championship: Runner-up 1932
- Southern German Championship: 1929–30, 1931–32; runner-up 1930–31
- Bezirksliga Main-Hessen: 1928–29, 1929–30, 1930–31, 1931–32; runner-up: 1932–33
- Gauliga Südwest/Mainhessen: 1937–38; runner-up: 1936–37
