= Moritz Zimmer =

German footballer

Personal information
- Full name: Moritz Zimmer
- Date of birth: 25 November 1993 (age 32)
- Place of birth: Germany
- Height: 1.90 m (6 ft 3 in)
- Position: Centre-back

Team information
- Current team: FK Pirmasens
- Number: 19

Youth career
- FSV Hilbringen
- JFG Saarschleife
- –2012: FC Brotdorf

Senior career*
Years	Team	Apps	(Gls)
2012–2013	FC Brotdorf		
2013–2016	SV Elversberg II		
2014–2016	SV Elversberg	9	(0)
2016–2019	Röchling Völklingen	85	(6)
2019–	FK Pirmasens	72	(3)
- * Club domestic league appearances and goals as of 13:23, 11 February 2022 (UTC)

Moritz Zimmer (born 25 November 1993) is a German footballer who plays as a centre-back for FK Pirmasens.

== Career ==
Zimmer made his professional debut for SV Elversberg in the 3. Liga on 8 February 2014, coming on as a substitute in the 90th minute for Serkan Göcer in the 2–2 home draw against Hallescher FC.
