= Kellerhoff =

Kellerhoff is a German language surname. Notable people with the name include:

- Bernhard Kellerhoff (1900–1978), German footballer
- Sven Felix Kellerhoff (1971), German historian, journalist and author
