= Ludwig Schmitt (footballer) =

German footballer

Personal information
- Date of birth: 28 October 1910
- Place of birth: Frankfurt, German Empire
- Date of death: After 1941
- Place of death: Soviet Union
- Position: Goalkeeper

Senior career*
| Years | Team | Apps | (Gls) |
| –1930 | BSC Oberrad | | |
| 1930–1938 | Eintracht Frankfurt | | |
- * Club domestic league appearances and goals

Ludwig Schmitt (28 October 1910 – after 1941) was a German footballer. He played club football with Eintracht Frankfurt.

== Career ==
The trained fitter Ludwig Schmitt played for Frankfurt club BSC Oberrad until 1930 when he was signed for Eintracht Frankfurt playing there until 1938. He won with Eintracht Bezirksliga Main-Hessen in 1930 which advanced the Frankfurt club to the Southern German Championship where the Eagles finished as runners-up to SpVgg Fürth. Thus, Eintracht advanced further to the 1931 German championship play-offs and were terminated in the quarter-finals.

Despite being talented Schmitt remained an understudy to Willibald Kreß of Rot-Weiss Frankfurt and Jahn Regensburg's Hans Jakob in both the South German selection and the Germany national team. However, in 1931 he was called up to an international match in Denmark as a back-up.

In the next two seasons Schmitt's Eintracht won another two Bezirksliga Main-Hessen league titles and in 1931-32 even won the Southern German Championship when after a heated up decider match against Bayern Munich that was abandoned after 83 minutes. After both teams advanced through the German championship play-offs Bayern won the final match to be crowned German champions.

After the 1933-34 he lost his regular spot at the Riederwald club and later was an on and off regular fixture as a goalkeeper.

In his last Eintracht season he won the Gauliga Südwest/Mainhessen without making any appearances.

Schmitt died in Soviet war captivity.

== Honours ==
- Bezirksliga Main-Hessen:
  - Champion: 1930–31, 1931–32
  - Runner-up: 1932–33
- Southern German Championship
  - Champion: 1931–32
  - Runner-up: 1930–31
- German Championship
  - Runner-up: 1932
- Gauliga Südwest/Mainhessen:
  - Champion: 1937–38
  - Runner-up: 1936–37

== Sources ==
- Matheja, Ulrich (2011). Unsere Eintracht - Eintracht Frankfurt - Die Chronik. Die Werkstatt. ISBN 978-3-89533-750-5.
