= Josef Bergmaier =

German footballer

Personal information
- Date of birth: 5 March 1909
- Place of birth: Munich, Germany
- Date of death: 5 March 1943 (aged 34)
- Place of death: Oryol, Russia
- Position: Forward

Youth career
- TV 1888 München
- –1929: FC Wacker München

Senior career*
Years	Team	Apps	(Gls)
1929–1938	Bayern Munich		

International career
1930–1933	Germany	8	(1)
- * Club domestic league appearances and goals

Josef Bergmaier (5 March 1909 – 5 March 1943) was a German footballer who played as a forward. Bergmaier played for three clubs in his hometown, Munich - TV 1888, FC Wacker, and, most notably, FC Bayern Munich, where he won the 1932 German football championship, scoring both goals in the final against Eintracht Frankfurt. Between 1930 and 1933 he won 8 caps for Germany, scoring once, in a 2–2 draw with Norway in 1932.

Bergmaier fought in World War II, and died on the Eastern Front in March 1943. His former teammate Franz Krumm died in similar circumstances four days later.
