= Hans Stubb =

German footballer

Hennes Stubb
Personal information
- Full name: Hans Stubb
- Date of birth: 8 October 1906
- Place of birth: Germany
- Date of death: 19 March 1973 (aged 66)
- Position: Defender

Youth career
- 1920–1925: Frankfurter FC Germania 1894

Senior career*
Years	Team	Apps	(Gls)
1925–1928	SpVgg Ostend 07 Frankfurt		
1928–1944	Eintracht Frankfurt	139	(9)

International career
1930–1934	Germany	10	(1)
- * Club domestic league appearances and goals

Hans "Hennes" Stubb (8 October 1906 – 19 March 1973) was a German footballer.

== Club career ==
He played in defense for Eintracht Frankfurt from 1928 to 1944.

== International career ==
He also played 10 times for Germany, scoring one goal. Stubb shot his only international against Hungary on a wet pitch from 60 metres.

== Trivia ==
Hans Stubb is listed as an honoured captain at Eintracht Frankfurt.

== Honours ==
- German championship :
  - Runners-up: 1932
- Southern German championship:
  - Champions: 1930, 1932
  - Runners-up: 1930–31
- Gauliga Südwest/Mainhessen
  - Champions: 1938
  - Runners-up: 1936–37
- Bezirksliga Main-Hessen:
  - Winners: 1927–28, 1928–29, 1929–30, 1930–31, 1931–32
  - Runners-up: 1932–33
