= Bezirksliga Rheinhessen-Saar =

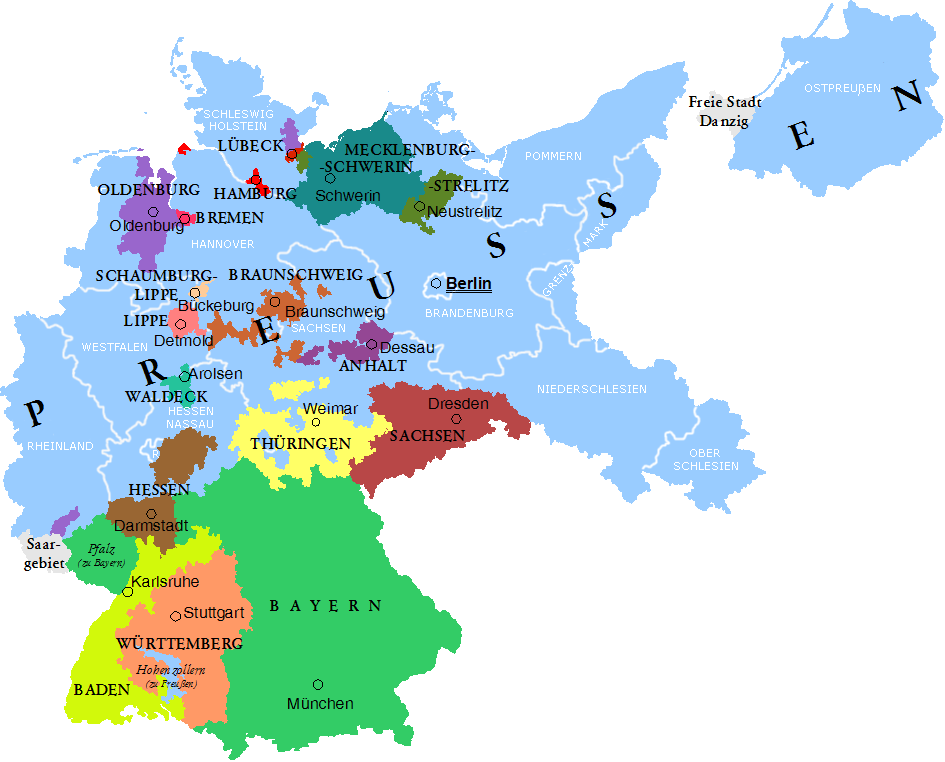
- Founded: 1923
- Folded: 1927
- Replaced by: Bezirksliga Rhein-Saar Bezirksliga Main-Hessen
- Country: Germany
- State: Saarland; Palatinate; Rhine Province
- Level on pyramid: Level 1
- Last champions: FSV Mainz 05 (1926–27)

The Bezirksliga Rheinhessen-Saar was the highest association football league in the German state of Saarland, the Rheinhessen part of the state of Hesse and parts of the Bavarian region of Palatinate and the Prussian Rhine Province from 1923 to 1927, when the league was replaced by the Bezirksliga Rhein-Saar and the Bezirksliga Main-Hessen.

== Overview ==
The league was formed in 1923, after a league reform which was decided upon in Darmstadt, Hesse. It replaced the Kreisliga Hessen and the Kreisliga Saar as the highest leagues in the region.

The Bezirksliga Rheinhessen-Saar, named after the region of Rhenish Hesse (German: Rheinhessen) and the river Saar, started out with eight teams, playing each other in a home-and-away round with the league winner advancing to the Southern German championship, which in turn was a qualification tournament for the German championship.

The league modus remained unchanged for its first three seasons, 1923–24, 1924–25 and 1925-26. For its last edition however, it expanded to ten clubs. Additionally, the leagues runners-up also qualified for a "consolidation" round with the other runners-up of the southern Bezirksligas. The winner of this round was awarded the third entry spot for the south to the German finals.

In an attempt to bring all Southern German leagues to a similar system, the Bezirksligas were reorganised in 1927. For the Bezirksliga Rheinhessen-Saar, this meant, it joined with the clubs of the Bezirksliga Rhein to form the new Bezirksliga Rhein-Saar. The clubs from the Saar region became part of the new Saar division of this league. The clubs from the Rhenish Hesse region however became part of the Hessen division of the new Bezirksliga Main-Hessen. It resulted in an even split of clubs, five going to the Main-Hessen league and the other five to the Rhein-Saar league.

== National success ==
=== Southern German championship ===
Qualified teams and their success:

- 1924:
  - Borussia Neunkirchen, 6th place
- 1925:
  - SV Wiesbaden, 5th place
- 1926:
  - FV Saarbrücken, 5th place
- 1927:
  - FV Saarbrücken, 5th place Bezirksliga-runners-up round
  - FSV Mainz 05, 6th place

=== German championship ===
Qualified teams and their success:

- 1924:
  - none qualified
- 1925:
  - none qualified
- 1926:
  - none qualified
- 1927:
  - none qualified

== Founding members of the league ==
The league was formed from eight teams:

- Borussia Neunkirchen
- SV Wiesbaden
- TG Höchst
- FV Saarbrücken
- 1. FC Idar
- SV Trier 05
- FV Biebrich
- Alemannia Worms

== Winners and runners-up of the Bezirksliga Rheinhessen-Saar ==
Season	Champions	Runners-Up
1923–24	Borussia Neunkirchen	SV Wiesbaden
1924–25	SV Wiesbaden	FV Saarbrücken
1925–26	FV Saarbrücken	FSV Mainz 05
1926–27	FSV Mainz 05	FV Saarbrücken

== Placings in the Bezirksliga Rheinhessen-Saar 1923 to 1927 ==
Club	1924	1925	1926	1927
Borussia Neunkirchen	1	5	6	7
SV Wiesbaden	2	1	5	4
TG Höchst	3	6	7	
FV Saarbrücken	4	2	1	2
1. FC Idar	5	3	3	6
SV Trier 05	6	8		
FV Biebrich	7			
Alemannia Worms	8			8
Wormatia Worms		4	4	3
Saar 05 Saarbrücken		7		9
FSV Mainz 05			2	1
SpVgg Griesheim			8	
Hassia Bingen				5
Eintracht Trier				10

Source:"Bezirksliga Rheinhessen-Saar". Das deutsche Fussball-Archiv.
