= Emil Rothardt =

German association football player

Personal information
- Date of birth: 8 March 1905
- Place of birth: Gelsenkirchen, Germany
- Date of death: 16 February 1969 (aged 63)
- Position: Left winger

Senior career*
Years	Team	Apps	(Gls)
1923–1935	Schalke 04	96	(65)
1936–1937	Alemannia Gelsenkirchen		
- * Club domestic league appearances and goals

Emil Rothardt (born Emil Czerwinski; 8 March 1905 – 16 February 1969) was a German footballer who played as a left winger. He played from 1923 until 1935 for Schalke 04. He won two German championships with the club.
