= FK Pirmasens =

German football club

- Full name: Fußballklub 03 Pirmasens e.V.
- Nickname: Die Macht vom Horeb
- Founded: 1903
- Ground: Sportpark Husterhöhe
- Capacity: 10,000
- Chairman: Emil Schweitzer
- Manager: Steven Dooley
- League: Oberliga Rheinland-Pfalz/Saar (V)
- 2025–26: Oberliga Rheinland-Pfalz/Saar, 2nd of 18
Home colours	Away colours

FK Pirmasens is a German association football club in Pirmasens, Rhineland-Palatinate. The team was formed as the football section of the gymnastics and sports club TV Pirminia Pirmasens in 1903 and became independent in 1914. They took on their current name in 1925. FK is one of the few teams that uses the German Klub in their name as opposed to the commonly affected English-style term Club.

== History ==
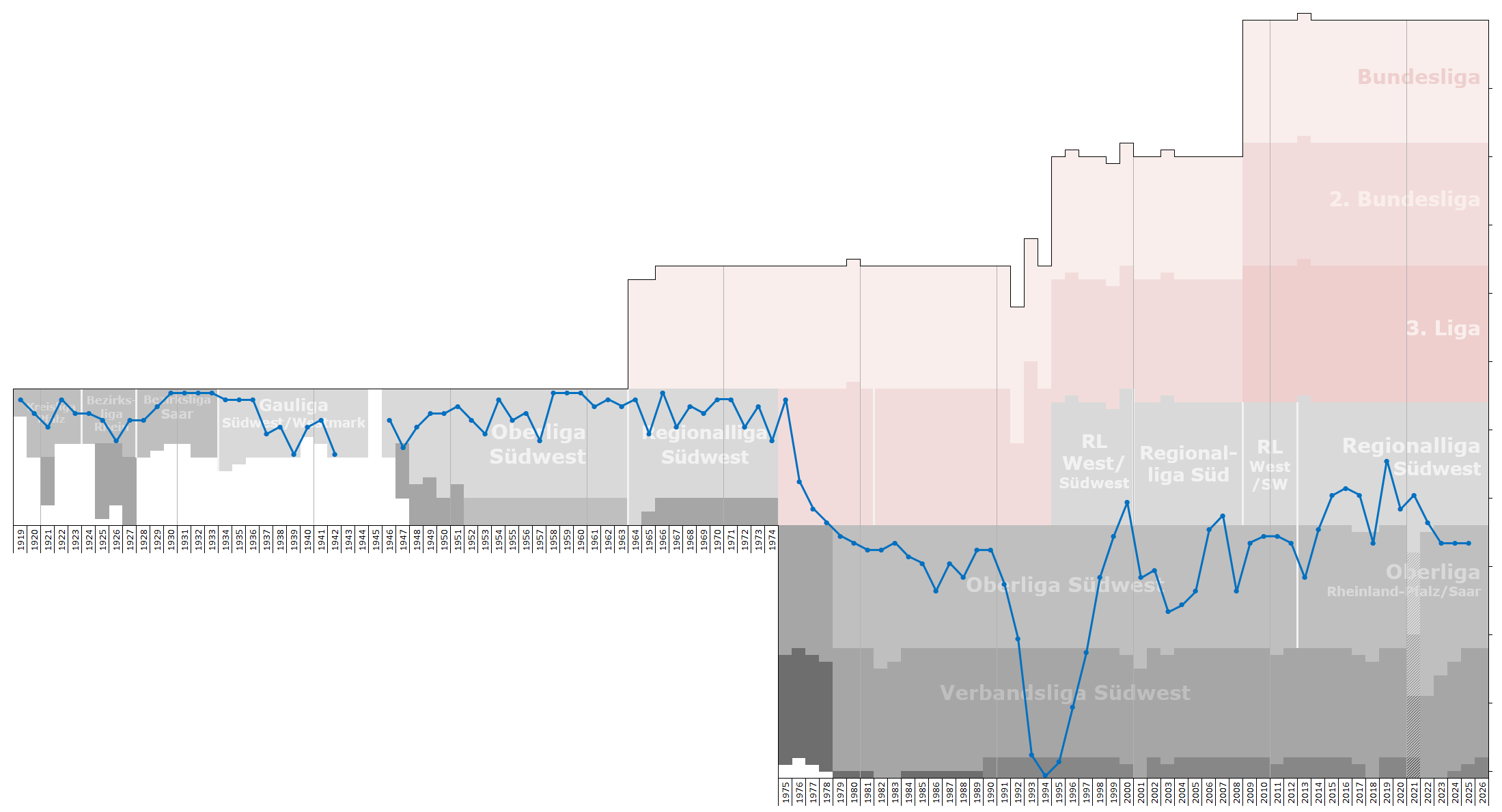
Historical chart of FK Pirmasens league performance

The club developed into a strong amateur side in southwestern Germany. In post-First World War play, the club was grouped in the tier-one Kreisliga Saar in 1919 but then moved to the Kreisliga Pfalz in 1920. From 1930 to 1933 the team made three consecutive appearances in the final of the Southern German championship, on the strength of four Bezirksliga Rhein-Saar titles, and between 1934 and 1936 were three times vice-champions of the Gauliga Südwest, one of sixteen top flight divisions formed in the re-organization of German football under the Third Reich. World War II was hard on the club: following a 0–26 beating at the hands of 1. FC Kaiserslautern in 1942 they withdrew from competition until after the conflict. After the war the club played in the Oberliga Südwest and captured league titles there in 1958, 1959 and 1960 while finishing as vice champions in 1954 and 1962. The club was so popular at the time that they often had to abandon their home ground in favour of the stadium in nearby Ludwigshafen in order to accommodate crowds of up to 65,000 spectators.

After the formation of the Bundesliga, Germany's new professional league, in 1963 Pirmasens found themselves in the second division Regionalliga Südwest where they consistently finished in the upper half of the league table over the course of the next decade. While they had several opportunities to advance to the Bundesliga through the promotion rounds they were unsuccessful. By the mid-1970s the club was faltering. They narrowly missed relegation in 1977, only staying up because rival SV Völklingen was denied a license. However, by 1980 they found themselves in the Amateur Oberliga Südwest (III), slipped to the Verbandsliga Südwest by 1993, and just two seasons later were playing in the Landesliga Südwest (VI). The club has recovered nicely and climbed as high as the third division Regionalliga Süd in 2006–07.

In 2006, the club stunned German football when they defeated Werder Bremen in the first round of the DFB-Pokal in a penalty shootout.

Since 2007 the club played in the Oberliga Südwest where the team has achieved good results, coming second in 2010 and 2011. From 2012 to 2013 the Oberliga Südwest was renamed Oberliga Rheinland-Pfalz/Saar, with FKP continuing in this league. The club won the championship in 2014 and earned promotion to the Regionalliga Südwest.

== Reserve team ==
The club's reserve team, FK Pirmasens II, achieved its greatest success in 2014–15 when it won promotion to the Oberliga Rheinland-Pfalz/Saar.

== Current squad ==
As of 23 September 2021

Note: Flags indicate national team as defined under FIFA eligibility rules; some limited exceptions apply. Players may hold more than one non-FIFA nationality.

No.	Pos.	Nation	Player
1	GK	GER	Benjamin Reitz
2	DF	GER	Jonas Vogt
4	DF	GER	Kevin Frisorger
5	MF	GER	Daniel Bohl
6	MF	GER	Yannick Griess
7	MF	GER	Benno Mohr
8	FW	ANG	Jabez Makanda
9	MF	GER	David Becker
10	MF	GER	Luca Eichhorn
11	FW	GER	Philipp Herrmann
12	MF	GER	Luka Dimitrijevic
14	DF	GER	Kevin Klein
15	MF	GER	Tim Hecker

No.	Pos.	Nation	Player
16	MF	GER	Sascha Hammann
17	DF	GER	Manuel Grünnagel
18	GK	GER	Ramon Büsken
19	DF	GER	Moritz Zimmer
20	FW	GER	Dennis Krob
21	MF	GER	Arman Ardestani
23	MF	GER	Salif Cissé
24	DF	GER	Bastian Skorski
26	MF	GER	Leon Ampadu Wiafe
27	GK	GER	Jan Schulz
29	MF	GER	Mike Scharwath
32	FW	GRE	Konstantinos Neofytos

== Honours ==
The club's honours:

=== League ===
- Oberliga Südwest (I)
  - Champions: 1958, 1959, 1960
  - Runners-up: 1954, 1962
- Bezirksliga Rhein-Saar (Saar division) (I)
  - Champions: 1930, 1931, 1932, 1933
- Regionalliga Südwest (II)
  - Champions: 1966
- 2nd Bundesliga Süd (II)
  - Runners-up: 1975
- Oberliga Südwest (IV)
  - Champions: 1999, 2006
- Oberliga Rheinland-Pfalz/Saar (V)
  - Champions: 2014
- Verbandsliga Südwest (V)
  - Champions: 1997, 2015^{‡}

=== Cup ===
- South West Cup
  - Winners: 1999, 2006, 2009, 2015, 2025

- ^{‡} Denotes won by reserve team.

== Recent seasons ==
The recent season-by-season performance of the club:

Season	Division	Tier	Position
1999–2000	Regionalliga West/Südwest	III	17th ↓
2000–01	Oberliga Südwest	IV	8th
2001–02	Oberliga Südwest	IV	7th
2002–03	Oberliga Südwest	IV	13th
2003–04	Oberliga Südwest	IV	12th
2004–05	Oberliga Südwest	IV	10th
2005–06	Oberliga Südwest	IV	1st ↑
2006–07	Regionalliga Süd	III	17th ↓
2007–08	Oberliga Südwest	IV	10th
2008–09	Oberliga Südwest	V	3rd
2009–10	Oberliga Südwest	V	2nd
2010–11	Oberliga Südwest	V	2nd
2011–12	Oberliga Südwest	V	3rd
2012–13	Oberliga Rheinland-Pfalz/Saar	V	8th
2013–14	Oberliga Rheinland-Pfalz/Saar	V	1st ↑
2014–15	Regionalliga Südwest	IV	14th
2015–16	Regionalliga Südwest	IV	13th
2016–17	Regionalliga Südwest	IV	14th ↓
2017–18	Oberliga Rheinland-Pfalz/Saar	V	2nd ↑
2018–19	Regionalliga Südwest	IV	9th
2019–20	Regionalliga Südwest	IV	16th

- With the introduction of the Regionalligas in 1994 and the 3. Liga in 2008 as the new third tier, below the 2. Bundesliga, all leagues below dropped one tier.

=== Key ===
↑ Promoted	↓ Relegated

== Famous players ==
Heinz Kubsch, played for West Germany's 1954 World Cup winning Miracle of Bern side.
