= VfB Friedberg =

German football club

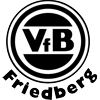
- Full name: Verein für Bewegungsspiele Friedberg e.V.
- Founded: 1918
- Ground: Burgfeld
- Capacity: 5,000
- Chairman: Horst Weitzel
- League: Kreisoberliga Friedberg (VIII)
- 2015–16: 3rd

The VfB Friedberg is a German association football club from the town of Friedberg, Hesse.

In pre-Second World War football the club has played at times at highest level, most notable the six seasons spend in the Gauliga Hessen from 1933 to 1939. In post war play the club spent just one season in the tier two 2. Oberliga Süd in 1958–59. After relegation from the tier three Amateurliga Hessen in 1963 the club permanently disappeared into regional amateur football where it plays today.

== History ==
Formed in 1918, VfB Friedberg first reached the highest level of play in the region in 1922 when it played for a season in the tier one Kreisliga Nordmain, alongside clubs like Eintracht Frankfurt and FSV Frankfurt. Relegated again immediately it returned to top-level football in 1932, now to the Bezirksliga Main-Hessen. This league was replaced by the Gauliga Hessen when the Nazis came to power in 1933 and VfB's most successful area began, lasting until the start of the Second World War in 1939. The new league did not include the strong clubs from Frankfurt, instead VfB played against clubs from Kassel and Fulda and finished runners-up in the league in 1934. In 1937 it qualified for the first round of the German Cup, losing 0–2 to SV Waldhof Mannheim, but with the outbreak of the war it had to withdraw from league football.

Post war play saw the club compete in the tier two Landesliga Hessen and, when this league was replaced by the Amateurliga Hessen in 1950, in the latter. The first couple of seasons were spent as a mid-table side but, in 1957, the club finished runners-up and in the season after won the league. VfB won promotion to the 2. Oberliga Süd where it lasted for only one season in 1958–59 before dropping back to the Amateurliga. The next four seasons the club gradually finished lower and lower and was eventually relegated from the league in 1963, making a permanent departure from Hesse's highest league.

Since then the club has played in regional amateur football, nowadays playing in the tier eight Kreisoberliga Friedberg.

== Honours ==
The club's honours:

- Gauliga Hessen
  - Runners-up: 1934
- Amateurliga Hessen
  - Champions: 1958
  - Runners-up: 1957

== Recent seasons ==
The recent season-by-season performance of the club:

Season	Division	Tier	Position
2003–04	Kreisliga A Friedberg	VIII	5th
2004–05	Kreisliga A Friedberg	VIII	3rd
2005–06	Kreisliga A Friedberg	VIII	2nd↑
2006–07	Bezirksliga Friedberg	VII	6th
2007–08	Bezirksliga Friedberg	VII	6th
2008–09	Kreisoberliga Friedberg	VIII	4th
2009–10	Kreisoberliga Friedberg	VIII	5th
2010–11	Kreisoberliga Friedberg	VIII	6th
2011–12	Kreisoberliga Friedberg	VIII	11th
2012–13	Kreisoberliga Friedberg	VIII	6th
2013–14	Kreisoberliga Friedberg	VIII	9th
2014–15	Kreisoberliga Friedberg	VIII	8th
2015–16	Kreisoberliga Friedberg	VIII	3rd
2016–17	Kreisoberliga Friedberg	VIII	

- With the introduction of the Regionalligas in 1994 and the 3. Liga in 2008 as the new third tier, below the 2. Bundesliga, all leagues below dropped one tier. Alongside the introduction of the 3. Liga in 2008, a number of football leagues in Hesse were renamed, with the Oberliga Hessen renamed to Hessenliga, the Landesliga to Verbandsliga, the Bezirksoberliga to Gruppenliga and the Bezirksliga to Kreisoberliga.

=== Key ===
↑ Promoted	↓ Relegated
