= Alfred Birlem =

German football player and referee (1888–1956)

August Robert Alfred Birlem
- Born: 10 January 1888
- Died: 13 April 1956 (aged 68)
- Other occupation: Football player

Domestic
Years	League	Role
1927–1935	German league	Referee

International
Years	League	Role
1936–1939	FIFA-listed	Referee

August Robert Alfred Birlem (10 January 1888 – 13 April 1956) was a German football player and referee, known for officiating in high-profile international tournaments during the 1930s.

== Playing career ==
Born in Berlin, Germany, Birlem began his football career as a player. He played for various clubs in Berlin, including Union 92, Berliner SC, and Viktoria 89. During his playing career, Birlem represented Berlin city in regional competitions, making nine appearances.

== Refereeing career ==
After his time as a player, Birlem transitioned to refereeing, where he became notable for his role in several international and domestic matches.

=== International ===
- 1934 FIFA World Cup: Birlem officiated the first-round match between Spain and Brazil, in which Spain won 3–1. He also served as an assistant referee in the Austria vs. Hungary quarterfinal match.
- 1936 Summer Olympics: Birlem was the referee for the bronze medal match between Norway and Poland, which ended in a 3–2 victory for Norway.
- 1938 FIFA World Cup: He officiated the replay of the Cuba vs. Romania first-round match, where Cuba emerged victorious 2–1. Birlem also served as an assistant referee for the France vs. Belgium match.

During his international refereeing career, Birlem officiated in 21 matches between 1927 and 1939.

=== Domestic ===
Birlem also played an instrumental role in German football, officiating numerous key matches in national competitions:

- German Championship Finals: He refereed the 1932 final between FC Bayern Munich and Eintracht Frankfurt, as well as the 1933 final between Fortuna Düsseldorf and FC Schalke 04.
- Tschammerpokal Final: In 1935, Birlem officiated the inaugural German Cup final between 1. FC Nürnberg and FC Schalke 04.

== Administrative career ==
After retiring from refereeing, Birlem continued to contribute to football through administrative roles. In 1951, he was appointed director of the sports school for the Verband Berliner Ballspielvereine (VBB) at Kleiner Wannsee, aiming to develop future football talent in Berlin.
