= Germania Bieber =

German football club

FV Germania Bieber
- Full name: Fußballverein Germania Bieber e.V.
- Founded: 1901
- Ground: Waldhof
- Capacity: 6,000
- League: Kreisliga A Offenbach-Ost (IX)
- 2015–16: 11th
Home colours	Away colours

Germania Bieber is a German association football club from the village of Bieber part of Offenbach, Hesse. The club was founded in 1901 as Fußballclub Germania Bieber and took on its current name after a 1919 merger with FV 1910 Bieber.

== History ==
Through the early 1910s Germania was part of the regional top flight Nordkreis-Liga before slipping to lower tier local play midway through the decade. The team returned to senior level play in 1928, but failed in its 1935 group playoff bid to become part of the Gauliga Südwest, one of 13 top flight regional divisions formed in the reorganization of German football under the Third Reich in 1933.

Following World War II, FV was part of the Landesliga Hessen (II) until 1953 when they again slipped into lower level play. They narrowly missed advancement several times in the 1960s before making it to fourth tier competition in 1968 for a three-year turn. The team has since faded and today is part of the tier nine Kreisliga A.
