= FC Hanau 93 =

German football club

- Full name: 1. Hanauer Fußball-Club 1893
- Nickname: die Schwarz-Weißen
- Founded: 1893
- Ground: Sportplatz an der Kastanienallee
- Capacity: ca. 800
- Chairman: Christian Keimer
- Coach: Giuseppe Scopelliti / Fatih Sinin
- League: Verbandsliga Hessen-Süd (VI)
- 2025–26: Oberliga Hessen (V), 18th of 18 (relegated)
Home colours	Away colours

FC Hanau 93 is a German association football club based in Hanau, Hesse.

== History ==
=== Early history ===
Founded in 1893, the club is Hesse's oldest. In its first year, the club was winless in a half dozen matches, but the next season emerged as south German champion and earned an appearance in a national championship match. Hanau was one of the founding clubs of the German Football Association formed in 1900.

In those early days of German football Hanau laid a 23–1 drubbing on a hopelessly green Kickers Offenbach side. The club managed a series of unsuccessful appearances in the local league final between 1902 and 1905 and were "robbed" of a title through bureaucratic machinations in 1907, before finally taking the local title in 1909. It became a founding member of the Nordkreis-Liga in 1909, where it played until the outbreak of the war. After the First World War, the club played in the Kreisliga Nordmain without any real success. In 1926, Hanau found itself in a legal squabble with FSV Frankfurt and the league that led to its exclusion from play for a short time. Through the late 1920s and into the 1930s the team played in the Bezirksliga Main-Hessen of the Süddeutschland Verband.

=== Nazi era ===
German football was reorganized into sixteen top-flight divisions, or Gauligen, in Nazi Germany in 1933. Playing in the Gauliga Hessen Hanau captured three more regional titles in the late 1930s (1935, 1936, 1938) and advanced to the quarter-finals of the inaugural Tschammerpokal, predecessor of today's DFB-Pokal, in 1935. The Gauliga Hessen was broken up into two divisions in 1941 with the club going to the Gauliga Hessen-Nassau where they played consistently good football until the collapse of football leagues in Germany at the end of World War II. In spite of their play they were not granted entry to the local upper-tier leagues once re-established after the war, being bypassed for clubs from larger towns, and losing their ground to the American military.

=== Post war football ===
However, the club pressed on, playing in improvised uniforms on temporary grounds. Through the next two decades they bounced up and down between what was then second and third division play in Hesse. Their play improved enough to earn the side regular appearances in the Oberliga Hessen (III) through the late 1960s and into the 1970s, and in 1978–79 they enjoyed the adventure of a break through into the 2nd Bundesliga Süd. After a 17th-place finish, they returned to the Oberliga Hessen (III) where they played until 1987. The club had a brush with financial failure in the mid-1990s that included the loss of their grounds, and considered a merger with Progres Frankfurt. They were able to recover themselves and, for a while, Hanau played in Gruppenliga Frankfurt Ost (VII) with a renewed focus on its youth teams. For the first time since the introduction of a single Hessenliga in the 1947–48 season, there was the first Hanau derby in the 2023–24 season. The city rival is the Verbandsliga Süd champions and climbers of the 2022–23 season, Hanauer SC 1960. HSC was founded in 1960 in a pub on Freigerichtstraße in the workers' housing estate, colloquially known as the "Dunlopviertel". and previously played in the Verbandsliga for seven years, in which the club rose from the group league for the first time in 2016. This first Hessenliga derby took place on Easter Saturday 2024 as the HSC's home game in the Herbert Dröse Stadium.

== National Championship Final (1894/2007) ==
In 1894, the club qualified for the national championship final organised by the Deutscher Fußball- und Cricketbund (German Football and Cricket Association), a predecessor of the German Football Association. BFC Viktoria 1889 and Hanau were scheduled to contest the country's championship in Berlin, but Hanau could not afford to make the trip and so forfeited the match, leaving Viktoria national football champions. In 2007 (113 years later), the final was finally played after enthusiastic support from the President of the German Football Federation (DFB), Theo Zwanziger. The first leg was won by Viktoria 3–0 and the second leg on 28 July ended as a draw at 1–1. The final was played with the heavy leather balls used in the late 19th century.

== Players ==
Note: Flags indicate national team as defined under FIFA eligibility rules; some limited exceptions apply. Players may hold more than one non-FIFA nationality.

No.	Pos.	Nation	Player
5	MF	GER	Ahmed Raafat
21	MF	GER	Tolga Talha Uenal

== Honours ==
The club's honours:

=== League (tier) ===
- Nordkreis-Liga (I)
  - Champions: 1916
  - Runners-up: 1912
- Gauliga Hessen (I)
  - Champions: 1935, 1936, 1938
  - Runners-up: 1939, 1941
- Oberliga Hessen (III)
  - Champions: 1953, 1961, 1978
- Gruppenliga Hessen Mitte (IV)
  - Champions: 1966
- Gruppenliga Hessen Süd (IV)
  - Champions: 1973, 1976
- Landesliga Hessen-Süd (IV)
  - Runners-up: 1984
- Gruppenliga Frankfurt Ost (VII)
  - Champions: 2017
- Bezirksliga Hanau (VII)
  - Champions: 2003
  - Runners-up: 2008
- Kreisoberliga Hanau (VIII)
  - Champions: 2010, 2015
  - Runners-up: 2014
- Kreisliga A Hanau (VIII)
  - Champions: 2000

=== Cup ===
- Hesse Cup
  - Winners: 1950, 1978

== Recent seasons ==
The recent season-by-season performance of the club:

Season	Division	Tier	Position
1999–2000	Kreisliga A Hanau	VIII	1st ↑
2000–01	Bezirksliga Hanau	VII	5th
2001–02	Bezirksliga Hanau	VII	4th
2002–03	Bezirksliga Hanau	VII	1st ↑
2003–04	Bezirksoberliga Frankfurt-Ost	VI	4th
2004–05	Bezirksoberliga Frankfurt-Ost	VI	5th
2005–06	Bezirksoberliga Frankfurt-Ost	VI	18th ↓
2006–07	Bezirksliga Hanau	VII	3rd
2007–08	Bezirksliga Hanau	VII	2nd ↑
2008–09	Gruppenliga Frankfurt Ost	VII	15th ↓
2009–10	Kreisoberliga Hanau	VIII	1st ↑
2010–11	Gruppenliga Frankfurt Ost	VII	7th
2011–12	Gruppenliga Frankfurt Ost	VII	15th ↓
2012–13	Kreisoberliga Hanau	VIII	4th
2013–14	Kreisoberliga Hanau	VIII	2nd
2014–15	Kreisoberliga Hanau	VIII	1st ↑
2015–16	Gruppenliga Frankfurt Ost	VII	5th
2016–17	Gruppenliga Frankfurt Ost	VII	1st ↑
2017–18	Verbandsliga Hessen-Süd	VI	3rd
2018–19	Verbandsliga Hessen-Süd	VI	2nd ↑
2019–20	Hessenliga	V	14th
2020–21	Hessenliga	V	4th
2021–22	Hessenliga	V	15th
2022–23	Hessenliga	V	8th
2023–24	Hessenliga	V	13th
2024–25	Hessenliga	V	

- With the introduction of the Regionalligas in 1994 and the 3. Liga in 2008 as the new third tier, below the 2. Bundesliga, all leagues below dropped one tier. Also in 2008, a large number of football leagues in Hesse were renamed, with the Oberliga Hessen becoming the Hessenliga, the Landesliga becoming the Verbandsliga, the Bezirksoberliga becoming the Gruppenliga and the Bezirksliga becoming the Kreisoberliga.

↑ Promoted	↓ Relegated
