= Rudolf Gramlich =

German footballer and manager

Personal information
- Date of birth: 6 June 1908
- Place of birth: Offenbach am Main, German Empire
- Date of death: 14 March 1988 (aged 79)
- Place of death: Frankfurt am Main, West Germany
- Position: Midfielder

Youth career
- 1923–1926: Borussia Frankfurt
- 1926–1929: Sportfreunde Freiberg/Sachsen

Senior career*
Years	Team	Apps	(Gls)
1929–1939	Eintracht Frankfurt	200	(16)
1942–1943	SS Totenkopfstandarte Krakau		
1943–1944	Eintracht Frankfurt		

International career
1931–1936	Germany	22	(0)

Managerial career
- 1951–1952: Darmstadt 98
Medal record
Men's football
Representing Germany
FIFA World Cup
Third place	1934 Italy
- * Club domestic league appearances and goals

Rudolf "Rudi" Gramlich (6 June 1908 – 14 March 1988) was a former SS officer, German football player and football club chairman. After the Second World War he was arrested and investigated for war crimes in Poland but was released without charge. He later was chairman of Eintracht Frankfurt during its most successful period. In 2020 the club took action to remove his posthumous titles due to his association with the Nazis.

== Biography ==
=== Career ===
In pre-war Germany, Gramlich played for Eintracht Frankfurt. He also made 22 international appearances for Germany between 1931 and 1936, achieving third place at the 1934 World Cup in Italy. He was the captain of the German team at the 1936 Olympic Games in Berlin.

From 1939 to 1942 he was chairman of Eintracht Frankfurt.

=== Military service ===
Gramlich joined the SS in 1936. In 1942 he was stationed as an SS officer in occupied Krakow, where he also headed the football section of the SS Death's Heads Unit. In 1945 he was arrested and held by the American forces in Frankfurt in 1947, because he was suspected of having been involved in war crimes. Finally, the case against him was closed because he was exonerated by former SS personnel.

=== Post war ===
Between 1955 and 1970 Gramlich was again the chairman of Eintracht Frankfurt. In 1959 Eintracht won its only German championship and the following year reached the European Cup final, losing 7–3 to Spain's Real Madrid.

In 2020, Eintracht Frankfurt stripped Gramlich of his posthumous title of honorary president for his active participation in the Nazi Party and the SS.

== Sources ==
- Aigner, Maximilian (2020). Vereinsführer: Vier Funktionäre von Eintracht Frankfurt im Nationalsozialismus. Wallstein Verlag. ISBN 978-3-8353-3844-9.
