= 1932 German football championship =

1932 German championship
Deutsche Fußballmeisterschaft
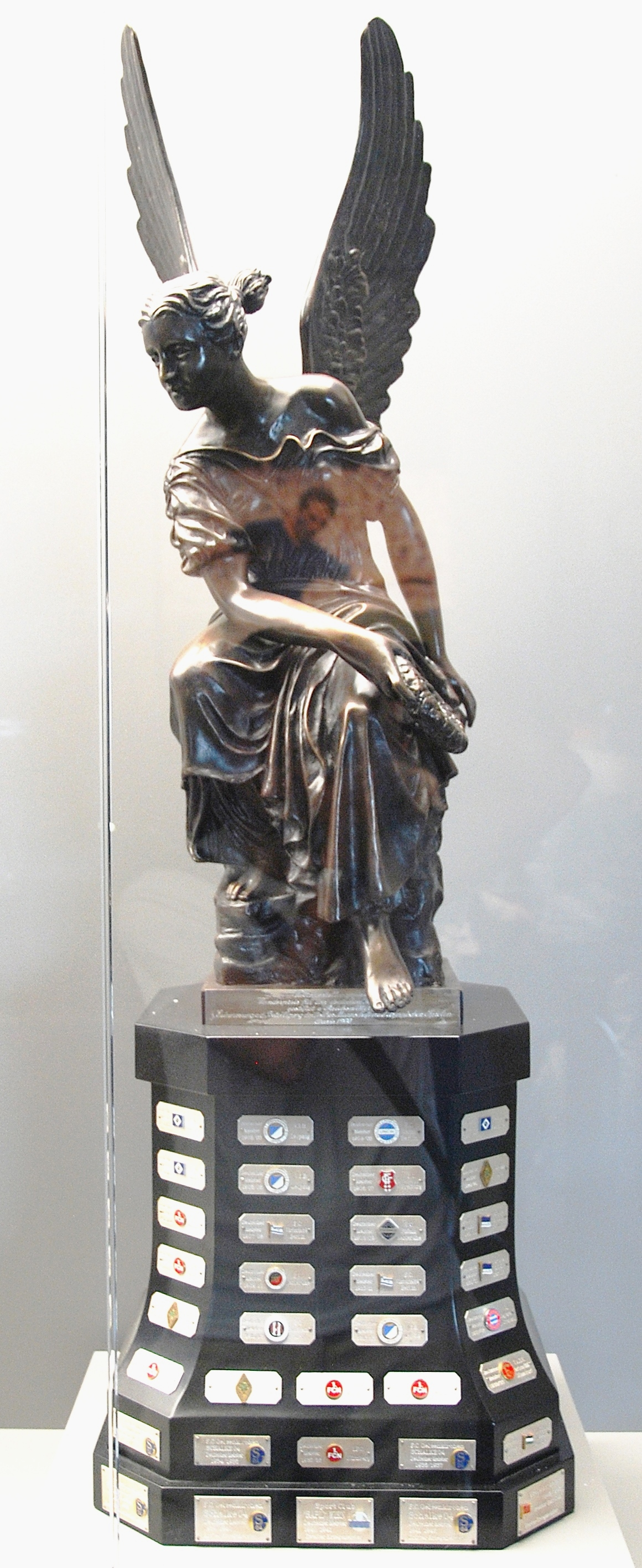
- Replica of the Viktoria trophy

Tournament details
- Country: Germany
- Dates: 8 May – 12 June
- Teams: 16

Final positions
- Champions: Bayern Munich; 1st German title
- Runner-up: Eintracht Frankfurt

Tournament statistics
- Matches played: 15
- Goals scored: 72 (4.8 per match)
- Attendance: 292,000 (19,467 per match)
- Top goal scorer(s): Karl Ehmer (7 goals)

The 1932 German football championship, the 25th edition of the competition, ended with the first national title for FC Bayern Munich. The title was won with a 2–0 over Eintracht Frankfurt. It was a replay of the Southern German championship final, in which Eintracht had defeated Bayern 2–0 on 24 April 1932.

For both clubs it was their first appearance in the German final. While Bayern, the winner, never appeared in another one, Eintracht made up for the 1932 loss by winning the 1959 final.

To qualify for the national championship, a team needed to win or finish runners-up in one of the seven regional championships. On top of those 14 clubs, the two strongest regions, West and South were allowed to send a third team each. In the West, this was the local cup winner while in the South, the third placed team of the championship received this place.

== Qualified teams ==
The teams qualified through the regional championships:

Club	Qualified as
SV Hindenburg Allenstein	Baltic champions
Viktoria Stolp	Baltic runners-up
Beuthener SuSV	South Eastern German champions
Breslauer SC 08	South Eastern German runners-up
Tennis Borussia Berlin	Brandenburg champion
Minerva 93 Berlin	Brandenburg runners-up
PSV Chemnitz	Central German champions
Plauener SuBC	Central German cup winner
Hamburger SV	Northern German champions
Holstein Kiel	Northern German runners-up
Schalke 04	Western German champions
Borussia Fulda	Western German runners-up
VfL Benrath	Western German Cup winner
Eintracht Frankfurt	Southern German champions
FC Bayern Munich	Southern German runners-up
1. FC Nürnberg	Southern German 3rd placed team

== Competition ==
=== Round of 16 ===
Date	Match			Result	Stadium
8 May 1932	1. FC Nürnberg	–	Borussia Fulda	5–2 (2–0)	Fürth, Platz am Ronhofer Weg
8 May 1932	Hamburger SV	–	VfL Benrath	3–1 (1–0)	Altona, Altonaer Stadion
8 May 1932	FC Bayern Munich	–	Minerva 93 Berlin	4–2 (1–1)	Munich, 1860-Heinrich-Zisch-Stadion
8 May 1932	FC Schalke 04	–	Plauener SuBC	5–4 aet (2–1, 4–4)	Dortmund, Kampfbahn Rothe Erde
8 May 1932	Hindenburg Allenstein	–	Eintracht Frankfurt	0–6 (0–4)	Königsberg (Preußen), Platz des VfB
8 May 1932	Tennis Borussia Berlin	–	Viktoria Stolp	3–0 (2–0)	Berlin, Stadion Bahnhof Eichkamp
8 May 1932	Breslauer SC 08	–	Holstein Kiel	1–4 (0–2)	Breslau, Sportpark Grüneiche
8 May 1932	PSV Chemnitz	–	Beuthener SuSV	5–1 (3–0)	Braunschweig, Preußen-Platz

=== Quarter-finals ===
Date	Match			Result	Stadium
22 May 1932	FC Schalke 04	–	Hamburger SV	4–2 (2–1)	Bochum, Stadion Castroper Straße
22 May 1932	Holstein Kiel	–	1. FC Nürnberg	0–4 (0–2)	Hamburg, Sportplatz Hoheluft
22 May 1932	Eintracht Frankfurt	–	Tennis Borussia Berlin	3–1 (1–1)	Frankfurt am Main, Riederwaldstadion
22 May 1932	PSV Chemnitz	–	FC Bayern Munich	2–3 (1–3)	Leipzig, Platz von Wacker Leipzig

=== Semi-finals ===
Date	Match			Result	Stadium
29 May 1932	FC Bayern Munich	–	1. FC Nürnberg	2–0 (0–0)	Mannheim, Mannheimer Stadion
29 May 1932	Eintracht Frankfurt	–	FC Schalke 04	2–1 (1–1)	Dresden, Stadion am Ostragehege

=== Final ===
12 June 1932

Bayern Munich	2–0	Eintracht Frankfurt
Rohr 36' (pen.); Krumm 75'	Report

Städtisches Stadion, Nuremberg
Attendance: 55,000
Referee: Alfred Birlem (Berlin)

== Top goalscorers ==
The top scorer of the competition:

	Name	Club	Goals
1st	Karl Ehmer	Eintracht Frankfurt	7
2nd	Erwin Helmchen	PSV Chemnitz	5
3rd	Oskar Rohr	FC Bayern Munich	5
4th	Emil Rothardt	FC Schalke 04	4
5th	Georg Friedel	1. FC Nürnberg	3
