= Franz Krumm =

German footballer

Personal information
- Date of birth: 16 October 1909
- Place of birth: Germany
- Date of death: 9 March 1943 (aged 33)
- Place of death: near Komarichi, RSFSR, Soviet Union
- Position: Forward

Senior career*
Years	Team	Apps	(Gls)
1931–1938	Bayern Munich		
1938–1943	1860 Munich		

International career
1932–1933	Germany	2	(1)
- * Club domestic league appearances and goals

Franz Krumm (16 October 1909 – 9 March 1943) was a German footballer who played as a forward.

On 12 June 1932, Krumm scored one of the goals in the 2–0 victory over Eintracht Frankfurt (the other goalscorer being Oskar Rohr) in the Städtisches Stadion in Nuremberg, helping Bayern Munich win the German football championship.

Krumm played two games for the Germany national team between 1932 and 1933, for which he scored one goal.

Krumm was killed in action while serving in the Wehrmacht on the Eastern Front of World War II in Russia.
