= Southern German football championship =

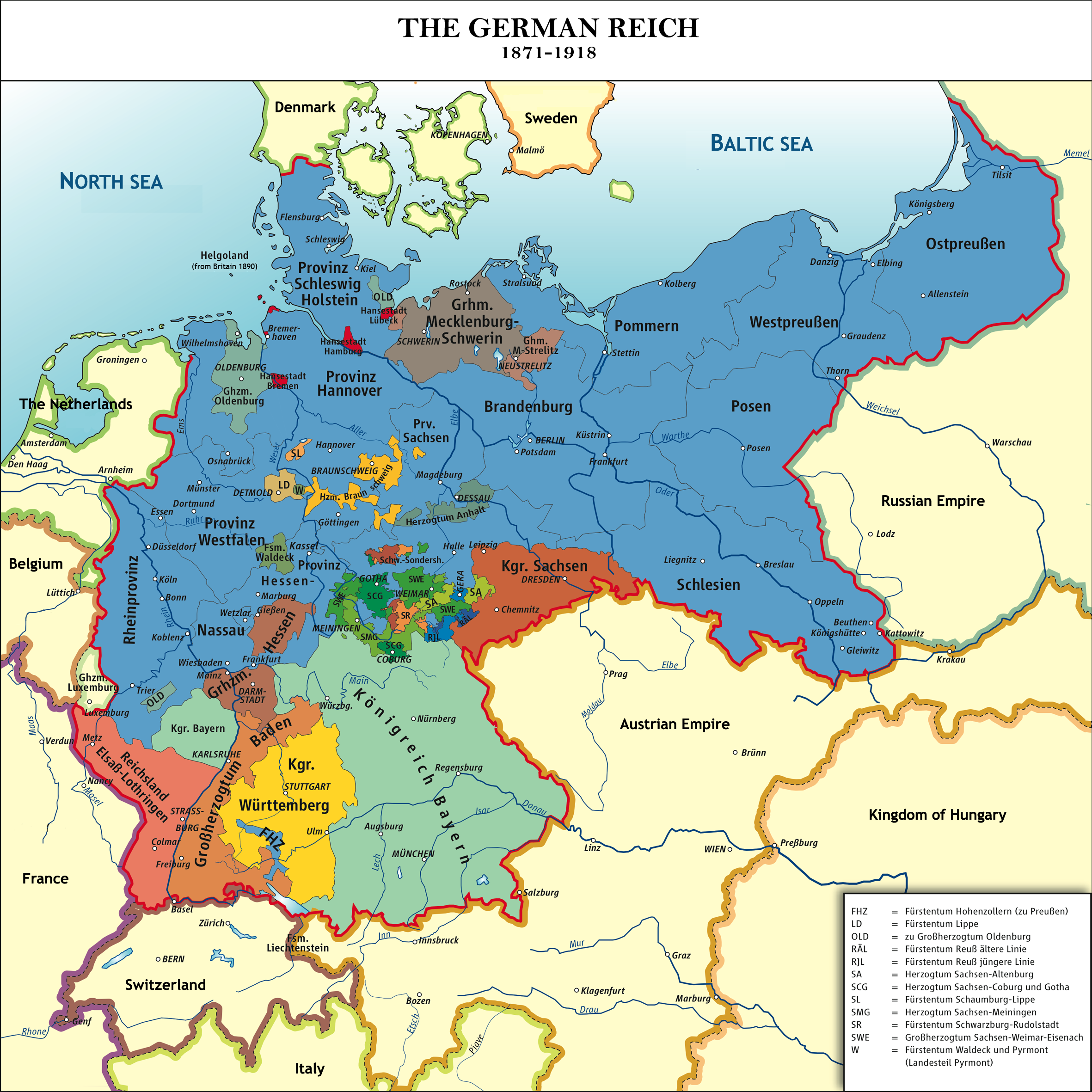
- Founded: 1898 1945 (reformed)
- Folded: 1933 (disbanded by the Nazis) 1963
- Replaced by: competition disbanded
- Country: German Empire Germany
- State: Southern Germany
- Level on pyramid: Level 1
- Last champions: TSV 1860 Munich (1962–63)

The Southern German football championship (German: Süddeutsche Meisterschaft) was the highest association football competition in the southern Germany, established in 1898. The competition was disbanded in 1933 with the rise of the Nazis to power.

While no senior Southern German championship exists nowadays, the under 15 juniors still play an annual competition for the title, often involving the junior teams of clubs who had once been involved in the senior edition.

== Overview ==
German football was, from its beginnings, divided into regional associations which carried out their own championship, which often pre-dated the national German championship. With the inception of the latter in 1903, the former became qualifying tournaments for it but these regional championships still held a high value for the local clubs. These regional championships were:

- Southern German football championship – formed in 1898
- Brandenburg football championship – formed in 1898
- Central German football championship – formed in 1902
- Western German football championship – formed in 1903
- March football championship – existed from 1903 to 1911
- Northern German football championship – formed in 1906
- South Eastern German football championship – formed in 1906
- Baltic football championship – formed in 1908

All this regional championships were suspended with the rise of the Nazis to power in 1933. At the end of the Second World War, some resumed, now in league format. Others completely disappeared, like the Baltic championship, as the territories they were held in were not part of Germany any more. With the South West German football championship, a new regional competition also appeared in 1945. Ultimately, with the formation of the Bundesliga, all this regional championships ceased altogether.

== History ==
=== From 1897 to 1919 ===
The Süddeutsche Fußball-Verband (SFV), the Southern German Football Association was formed in Karlsruhe on 17 October 1897, three years before the German Football Association (DFB) was formed. It originally was named Verband Süddeutscher Fußball-Vereine (English: Association of Southern German football clubs). One of the leading figures and driving force in the Southern German football was Walther Bensemann, founder of the kicker sportmagazin, a position he retained until the Nazis rise to power. The other driving force behind football in the south of Germany was Friedrich Wilhelm Nohe, chairman of the Karlsruher FV. The association was formed by eight clubs, those being:

- Karlsruher FV
- Phönix Karlsruhe
- Fidelitas Karlsruhe
- 1. FC Pforzheim
- FC Heilbronn
- FG 96 Mannheim
- FC Hanau 93
- Germania 94 Frankfurt

The SFV originally covered a much larger area. Upon its formation in 1897, the following German states and regions were part of it:

- Kingdom of Bavaria
- Kingdom of Württemberg
- Grand Duchy of Baden
- Grand Duchy of Hesse
- Alsace-Lorraine
- Prussian Province of Hohenzollern
- Prussian Province of Hesse-Nassau (southern parts only)
- Prussian Rhine Province (southern parts only)

From 1898, the SFV started to organise an annual Southern German football championship. With the inception of the German football championship in 1903, the Southern German championship functioned as a qualifying tournament for it. Nevertheless, it still enjoyed a high value of status. The competition went through a number of changes throughout its live time. From this season onwards, the competition also grew in size. Previously, only a few selected clubs from cities like Frankfurt, Mannheim and Karlsruhe had taken part, now clubs from Bavaria also entered the competition.

In its early years, competition was very localised and patchy, with a handful of clubs dominating play. From 1907, football became more organised with Southern Germany being split in four local districts (German: Kreis), from 1910 each had their own top-league:

- Nordkreis-Liga, covering Hesse
- Ostkreis-Liga, covering Bavaria
- Südkreis-Liga, covering Württemberg, Baden and Alsace
- Westkreis-Liga, covering the Palatinate, Lorraine and the southern Rhine Province

This step, away from localised competition and towards a more centralised system of leagues with strong competition was a vital factor in the rise of the Southern German clubs to dominance in Germany in the 1920s.

=== 1919 to 1933 ===
After the end of the First World War, the region of Alsace-Lorraine once more became part of France and its clubs did not compete in the SFV-championship any more.

From the 1919–20 season, Southern Germany was sub-divided into ten regional leagues, those being:

- Kreisliga Hessen
- Kreisliga Nordbayern
- Kreisliga Nordmain
- Kreisliga Odenwald
- Kreisliga Pfalz
- Kreisliga Saar
- Kreisliga Südbayern
- Kreisliga Südmain
- Kreisliga Südwest
- Kreisliga Württemberg

The ten league champions then played in two groups of three and one group of four to determine four clubs to enter the semi-finals, the group winners and the second placed team in the group of four qualifying for it. The semi-final winners then entered the Southern German final.

The number of leagues remained the same for the 1922 edition but now league winner and runners-up both qualified for a knock-out round to determine the champion.

In 1923, the league winners again were the only once qualified and the ten teams played a knock-out round first, the remaining five then played a home-and-away tournament for the championship.

After the 1923 season, the German league system was reorganised and streamlined. In the region of the SFV, new Bezirksligas were established as the highest level of play:

- Bezirksliga Bayern
- Bezirksliga Main
- Bezirksliga Rhein
- Bezirksliga Rheinhessen-Saar
- Bezirksliga Württemberg-Baden

For the 1924 championship, this meant, the five league champions and the 1923 champion were qualified to compete in a home-and-away round for the title. Only the champion would then move on to the German championship. In the following season, only the five league winners would compete for the southern title but the best three teams from this competition would then qualify for the German title tournament. For the 1926 edition, the modus remained unchanged apart from the Southern German cup winner also entering the finals tournament.

In 1927, the modus again remained unchanged. However, an additional tournament for the five Bezirksliga runners-up was introduced. The winner of this competition then took up the third Southern German spot in the German Finals, alongside the winner and runners-up of the championship tournament.

After this season, the Bezirksligas were partly reorganised and reduced to four in numbers. However, each Bezirksliga in turn was sub-divided into two regional groups:

- Bezirksliga Bayern, divided into northern and southern Bavaria
- Bezirksliga Main-Hessen, divided into Main and Hessen
- Bezirksliga Rhein-Saar, divided into Rhein and Saar
- Bezirksliga Württemberg-Baden, divided into Württemberg and Baden

From the 1928 season, the best team from each of the eight divisions qualified for southern tournament, still played in a home-and-away modus. Additionally, the second and third placed team from each league went to a consolidation tournament. These sixteen clubs were split into two divisions of eight, regionally subdivided. The two division winners then played an on-off final to determine the third southern team to go to the German finals.

This modus was in place for the 1928, 1929, 1930 and 1931 season.

For its last two seasons, 1932 and 1933, the modus was changed once more for the Southern German championship. The league winners and runners-up now qualified both for the finals tournament, which was played in two groups of eight teams, again regionally sub-divided. The two division winners then played out the Southern championship, with both teams still being qualified for the German finals. The two division runners-up played for the third and last spot at the German finals from the south. The 1932 and 1933 season only differed as far as the regional make up being changed in 1933, away from the system were Württemberg-Baden-Bayern played in one group and Main-Hessen-Rhein-Saar in the other, as it traditionally had been.

The 1932 Southern German final ended in something of a scandal, when the game between Eintracht Frankfurt and the FC Bayern Munich had to be stopped at a 2–0 lead for Eintracht, seven minutes before the end. Bayern supporters had stormed the field and Eintracht Frankfurt was declared the winner. Incidentally, the German final became a rematch which the FC Bayern won 2–0.

=== 1933 to 1945 ===
With the Nazis rise to power in 1933, the Southern German championship was disbanded. The new Nazi Germany did not wish for regional identities to be preserved. Instead of the Bezirksligas, the Gauligas were established:

- Gauliga Bayern
- Gauliga Württemberg
- Gauliga Baden
- Gauliga Südwest/Mainhessen

A Southern championship was not played anymore.

=== After 1945 ===
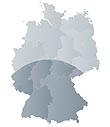
Current region of Southern Germany

Shortly after the end of the Second World War, the Oberliga Süd was established and the South of Germany had a united highest football league for the first time. The region it covered in 1945 originally was:

- Bavaria
- Württemberg
- Hesse
- Baden, northern half only

From 1950, the southern half of the state of Baden also became part of the Oberliga Süd region. The area west of the river Rhine however remained separate from the SFV and formed the Oberliga Südwest.

Up until 1963, the winner of the Oberliga Süd was still referred to as Southern German champions. After 1963, a competition which would have determined a true Southern German champion was not played anymore.

The Oberliga system was disbanded in 1963 in favor of the Bundesliga and the Regionalliga Süd, a tier-two league became the highest regional league. With its disbanding in 1974 in favor of the 2. Bundesliga Süd, the region which was once covered by the Southern German football championship briefly had a united league again, even so it was only on the second tier. This league in turn was disbanded in 1981 for the 2. Bundesliga, which ended the days of a Southern German league.

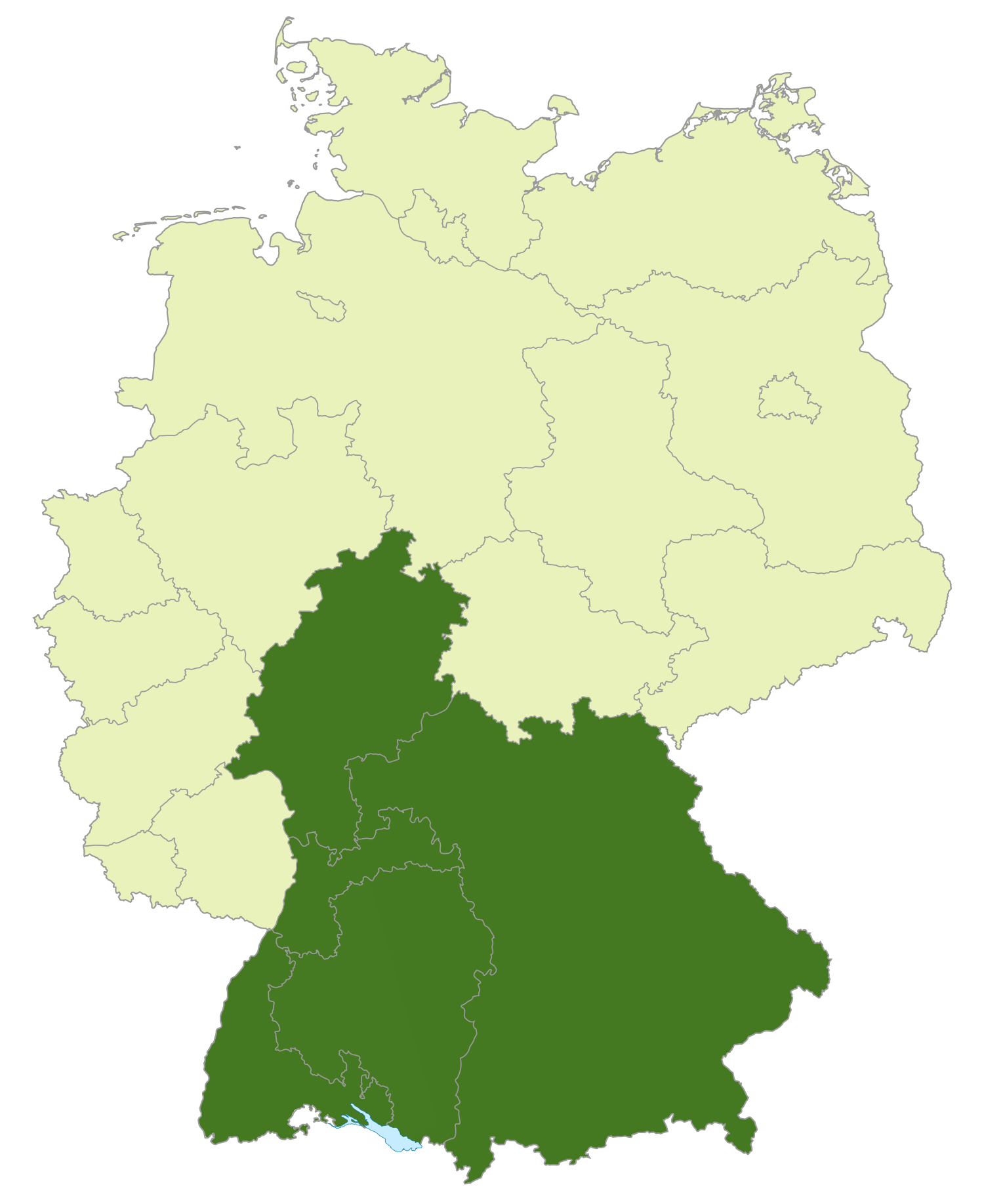
Map of Germany:Position of the Oberliga/Regionalliga Süd highlighted

In 1994, the Regionalliga Süd was re-established, now as a tier-three league, covering the three states of Bavaria, Baden-Württemberg and Hesse. From 2000 to 2008, the south western clubs also formed part of this league once more. From 2008, with the establishment of the 3. Liga, the three southern states are once more the only once covered by this league, now on the fourth tier of the German league system.

Nowadays the Southern German Football Association is made up of the following five federations:

- Bavarian Football Federation (BFV)
- Württemberg Football Federation (WFV)
- (North-) Baden Football Federation (BFV)
- Südbaden Football Federation (SBFV)
- Hesse Football Federation (HFV)

== Southern German champions ==
=== 1899 to 1933: Southern German championship ===
Season	Winner	Runner-up
1898	Freiburger FC	Karlsruher FV
1899	Straßburger FV	Karlsruher FV
1900	Straßburger FV	Karlsruher FV
1901	Karlsruher FV	Germania 94 Frankfurt
1902	Karlsruher FV	FC Hanau 93
1903	Karlsruher FV	FC Hanau 93
1904	Karlsruher FV	Germania Frankfurt
1905	Karlsruher FV	FC Hanau 93
1906	1. FC Pforzheim	FC Hanau 93
1907	Freiburger FC	1. FC Nürnberg
1908	Stuttgarter Kickers	1. FC Nürnberg
1909	Phönix Karlsruhe	1. FC Nürnberg
1910	Karlsruher FV	FC Bayern Munich
1911	Karlsruher FV	FC Bayern Munich
1912	Karlsruher FV	Phönix Mannheim
1913	Stuttgarter Kickers	Frankfurter FV
1914	SpVgg Fürth	Frankfurter FV
1915	Not held	Not held

Season	Winner	Runner-up
1916	1. FC Nürnberg	Ludwigshafener FC Pfalz
1917	Stuttgarter Kickers	SpVgg Fürth
1918	1. FC Nürnberg	Union Stuttgart
1919	Not held	Not held
1920	1. FC Nürnberg	Ludwigshafener FC Pfalz
1921	1. FC Nürnberg	Phönix Ludwigshafen
1922	Wacker München	Borussia Neunkirchen
1923	SpVgg Fürth	Phönix Ludwigshafen
1924	1. FC Nürnberg	SpVgg Fürth
1925	VfR Mannheim	1. FC Nürnberg
1926	FC Bayern Munich	SpVgg Fürth
1927	1. FC Nürnberg	SpVgg Fürth
1928	FC Bayern Munich	Eintracht Frankfurt
1929	1. FC Nürnberg	FC Bayern Munich
1930	Eintracht Frankfurt	SpVgg Fürth
1931	SpVgg Fürth	Eintracht Frankfurt
1932	Eintracht Frankfurt	FC Bayern Munich
1933	FSV Frankfurt	TSV 1860 Munich

- The SpVgg Fürth won the German Championship in 1929, qualifying as the third Southern German team.

== Winners and runners–up of the Oberliga Süd ==
The winners and runners–up of the Oberliga Süd:

Season	Winner	Runner–Up
1945–46	VfB Stuttgart	1. FC Nürnberg
1946–47	1. FC Nürnberg	SV Waldhof Mannheim
1947–48	1. FC Nürnberg	TSV 1860 Munich
1948–49	Kickers Offenbach	VfR Mannheim
1949–50	SpVgg Fürth	VfB Stuttgart
1950–51	1. FC Nürnberg	SpVgg Fürth
1951–52	VfB Stuttgart	1. FC Nürnberg
1952–53	Eintracht Frankfurt	VfB Stuttgart
1953–54	VfB Stuttgart	Eintracht Frankfurt
1954–55	Kickers Offenbach	SSV Reutlingen
1955–56	Karlsruher SC	VfB Stuttgart
1956–57	1. FC Nürnberg	Kickers Offenbach
1957–58	Karlsruher SC	1. FC Nürnberg
1958–59	Eintracht Frankfurt	Kickers Offenbach
1959–60	Karlsruher SC	Kickers Offenbach
1960–61	1. FC Nürnberg	Eintracht Frankfurt
1961–62	1. FC Nürnberg	Eintracht Frankfurt
1962–63	TSV 1860 Munich	1. FC Nürnberg

- Bold Denotes team went on to win German Championship.

== Finals ==
The Southern German championship was not always decided by a one-off final. Before 1908, the championship was carried out with a final. From 1908, the championship was determined through a home-and-away round with the first placed team automatically winning the championship. In the 1916, 1918, 1920, 1921, 1932 and 1933 season, a final was played again.

Year	Champion	Runner-Up	Result	Date	Venue	Attendance
1898	Freiburger FC	Karlsruher FV	2–0			
1899	Straßburger FV	Karlsruher FV	4–3			
1900	Straßburger FV	Karlsruher FV				
1901	Karlsruher FV	Germania Frankfurt				
1902	Karlsruher FV	FC Hanau 93	4–0			
1903	Karlsruher FV	FC Hanau 93	5–2			
1904	Karlsruher FV	Germania Frankfurt	5–0			
1905	Karlsruher FV	FC Hanau 93	not played			
1906	1. FC Pforzheim	FC Hanau 93	5–3			
1907	Freiburger FC	1. FC Nürnberg	1–1 / 3–1			
1916	1. FC Nürnberg	Ludwigshafener FC Pfalz	4–1		Stuttgart	
1918	1. FC Nürnberg	Union Stuttgart	6–2 / 3–2			
1920	1. FC Nürnberg	Ludwigshafener FC Pfalz	3–0		Stuttgart	
1921	1. FC Nürnberg	Phönix Ludwigshafen	2–1 aet	30 April 1921	Stuttgart	
1922	Wacker München	Borussia Neunkirchen	2–1 aet	14 May 1922	Frankfurt	
1932	Eintracht Frankfurt	FC Bayern Munich	2–0^{1}	1 May 1932	Stuttgart	50,000
1933	FSV Frankfurt	TSV 1860 Munich	1–0	30 April 1933	Frankfurt	

- ^{1} Game stopped in 83rd minute due to pitch invasion, Eintracht Frankfurt declared the winner.

== Cup competition ==
From 1918 to 1927, the SFV also carried out a cup competition, the Süddeutscher Pokal (English: Southern German Cup), long before a national competition was introduced in Germany in 1935. At times, this cup winner also gained entry to the Southern German championship. The record winner of this competition is the SpVgg Fürth with five titles.

Year	Champion	Runner-Up	Result	Date	Venue	Attendance
1918	SpVgg Fürth	Stuttgarter Kickers	2–1	21 April 1918	Stuttgart	5,000
1919	1. FC Nürnberg	Stuttgarter SC	5–2			
1920	Stuttgarter SC	Waldhof Mannheim	5–3			
1921	Borussia Neunkirchen	Nürnberger FV	3–2			
1922	TV 1847 Augsburg	Freiburger FC	3–1			
1923	SpVgg Fürth	FC Bayern Munich	4–3	17 June 1923	Munich	10,000
1924	1. FC Nürnberg	Stuttgarter Kickers	1–0			
1925	SpVgg Fürth	Stuttgarter Kickers	2–0	23 August 1925	München	7,000
1926	SpVgg Fürth	VfB Stuttgart	3–2 aet	1 August 1926	Frankfurt	20,000
1927	SpVgg Fürth	FSV Frankfurt	3–0	14 August 1927	Stuttgart	8,000

After the Second World War, the Southern German Cup was revitalised in 1952 and functioned as a qualifying tournament for the German Cup. The cup competition was last played in 1974.

== Regional champions ==
=== 1907 to 1919 ===
**Year**	**Nordkreis**	**Ostkreis**	**Südkreis**	**Westkreis**
1907	FC Hanau 93	1. FC Nürnberg	**Freiburger FC**	
1908	FC Hanau 93	1. FC Nürnberg	**Stuttgarter Kickers**	Ludwigshafener FC Pfalz
1909	FC Hanau 93	1. FC Nürnberg	**Phönix Karlsruhe**	FV Kaiserslautern
1910	Victoria Hanau	FC Bayern Munich	**Karlsruher FV**	Mannheimer FG
1911	SV Wiesbaden	FC Bayern Munich	**Karlsruher FV**	Mannheimer FG
1912	Frankfurter FV	SpVgg Fürth	**Karlsruher FV**	Phönix Mannheim
1913	Frankfurter FV	SpVgg Fürth	**Stuttgarter Kickers**	VfR Mannheim
1914	Frankfurter FV	**SpVgg Fürth**	Stuttgarter Kickers	VfR Mannheim
1915	not held	not held	not held	not held
1916	FC Hanau 93	**1. FC Nürnberg**	Freiburger FC	Ludwigshafener FC Pfalz
1917	FSV Frankfurt	SpVgg Fürth	**Stuttgarter Kickers**	Ludwigshafener FC Pfalz
1918	Amicitia Frankfurt	**1. FC Nürnberg**	Union Stuttgart	Phönix Mannheim
1919	Frankfurter FV	not held	not held	not held

=== 1920 to 1923 ===
**Year**	**Nordbayern**	**Südbayern**	**Württemberg**	**Südwest**	**Odenwald**
1920	**1. FC Nürnberg**	FC Bayern Munich	Stuttgarter SC	Freiburger FC	Waldhof Mannheim
1921	**1. FC Nürnberg**	Wacker München	Stuttgarter Kickers	1. FC Pforzheim	Waldhof Mannheim
1922	SpVgg Fürth	**Wacker München**	Sportfreunde Stuttgart	Karlsruher FV	VfR Mannheim
1923	**SpVgg Fürth**	FC Bayern Munich	Stuttgarter Kickers	1. FC Pforzheim	Phönix Mannheim

**Year**	**Hessen**	**Nordmain**	**Südmain**	**Pfalz**	**Saar**
1920	Germania Wiesbaden	Frankfurter FV	Kickers Offenbach	Ludwigshafener FC Pfalz	Saar 05 Saarbrücken
1921	FSV Mainz 05	Eintracht Frankfurt	Kickers Offenbach	Phönix Ludwigshafen	Borussia Neunkirchen
1922	SV Wiesbaden	Germania Frankfurt	VfL Neu-Isenburg	Phönix Ludwigshafen	Borussia Neunkirchen
1923	SV Wiesbaden	FSV Frankfurt	Kickers Offenbach	Phönix Ludwigshafen	Borussia Neunkirchen

=== 1924 to 1927 ===
**Year**	**Bayern**	**Mainbezirk**	**Rheinbezirk**	**Rheinhessen-Saar**	**Württemberg-Baden**
1924	**1. FC Nürnberg**	FSV Frankfurt	Waldhof Mannheim	Borussia Neunkirchen	Stuttgarter Kickers
1925	1. FC Nürnberg	FSV Frankfurt	**VfR Mannheim**	SV Wiesbaden	Stuttgarter Kickers
1926	**FC Bayern Munich**	FSV Frankfurt	VfR Mannheim	FV Saarbrücken	Karlsruher FV
1927	**1. FC Nürnberg**	FSV Frankfurt	VfL Neckarau	FSV Mainz 05	VfB Stuttgart

=== 1928 to 1933 ===
**Year**	**Baden**	**Württemberg**	**Nordbayern**	**Südbayern**
1928	Karlsruher FV	Stuttgarter Kickers	SpVgg Fürth	**FC Bayern Munich**
1929	Karlsruher FV	Germania Brötzingen	**1. FC Nürnberg**	FC Bayern Munich
1930	Freiburger FC	VfB Stuttgart	SpVgg Fürth	FC Bayern Munich
1931	Karlsruher FV	Union Böckingen	**SpVgg Fürth**	FC Bayern Munich
1932	Karlsruher FV	1. FC Pforzheim	1. FC Nürnberg	FC Bayern Munich
1933	Phönix Karlsruhe	Stuttgarter Kickers	1. FC Nürnberg	FC Bayern Munich

**Year**	**Main**	**Hessen**	**Rhein**	**Saar**
1928	Eintracht Frankfurt	Wormatia Worms	Waldhof Mannheim	FV Saarbrücken
1929	Eintracht Frankfurt	Wormatia Worms	VfL Neckarau	Borussia Neunkirchen
1930	**Eintracht Frankfurt**	Wormatia Worms	Waldhof Mannheim	FK Pirmasens
1931	Eintracht Frankfurt	Wormatia Worms	Waldhof Mannheim	FK Pirmasens
1932	**Eintracht Frankfurt**	FSV Mainz 05	Waldhof Mannheim	FK Pirmasens
1933	**FSV Frankfurt**	FSV Mainz 05	Waldhof Mannheim	FK Pirmasens

Source:"Germany – Championships 1902–1945". RSSSF.

- **Bold** indicates Southern German Champion.

== Junior level ==
=== Under 19 championship ===
From 1946, an under 19 championship for Southern Germany existed, having been played annually. A German Under 19 championship was only established in 1969 and shortly after this, in 1973, the Southern German edition was disbanded.

Year	Champions
1946	VfL Kornwestheim
1947	Union Böckingen
1948	Germania Nürnberg
1949	TG Viktoria Augsburg
1950	FC Bayern Munich
1951	VfB Mühlburg
1952	Kickers Offenbach
1953	FC Konstanz
1954	FC Bayern Munich
1955	VfB Stuttgart
1956	1. FC Nürnberg
1957	Karlsruher SC
1958	1. FC Nürnberg
1959	VfR Mannheim

Year	Champions
1960	1. FC Nürnberg
1961	Karlsruher SC
1962	Karlsruher SC
1963	TSV 1860 Munich
1964	1. FC Nürnberg
1965	1. FC Nürnberg
1966	VfB Stuttgart
1967	VfB Stuttgart
1968	VfB Stuttgart
1969	Karlsruher SC
1970	Eintracht Frankfurt
1971	1. FC Nürnberg
1972	Kickers Offenbach
1973	Kickers Offenbach

=== Under 15 championship ===
In 1979, a Southern German under 15 championship was established, being played annually between the five regional champions. It is now the only level of men's football that still plays out a true Southern championship. The end-of-season tournament is held at a neutral location. Since 2010 the Under 15 Regionalliga Süd is organised in the region, consisting of the best under 15 sides in Southern Germany.

Year	Champions
1979	SV Gengenbach
1980	Eintracht Frankfurt
1981	VfB Stuttgart
1982	FC Bayern Munich
1983	1. FC Nürnberg
1984	VfB Stuttgart
1985	FC Bayern Munich
1986	VfB Stuttgart
1987	FC Bayern Munich
1988	1. FC Nürnberg
1989	Eintracht Frankfurt
1990	FC Bayern Munich
1991	FC Bayern Munich
1992	VfB Stuttgart
1993	1. FC Nürnberg

Year	Champions
1994	Kickers Offenbach
1995	Eintracht Frankfurt
1996	VfB Stuttgart
1997	VfB Stuttgart
1998	
1999	
2000	
2001	VfB Stuttgart
2002	Waldhof Mannheim
2003	SC Freiburg
2004	SC Freiburg
2005	Eintracht Frankfurt
2006	Kickers Offenbach
2007	VfB Stuttgart
2008	
