= Bezirksliga Main-Hessen =

German football league

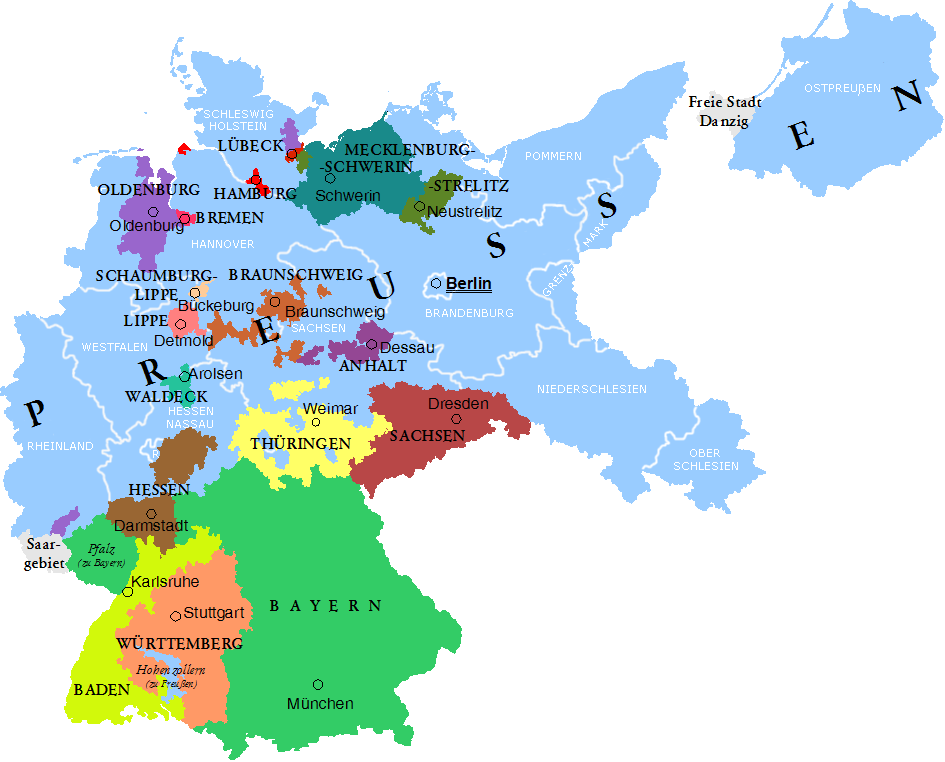
- Founded: 1927
- Folded: 1933
- Replaced by: Gauliga Südwest/Mainhessen
- Country: Germany
- State: Hesse-Nassau; People's State of Hesse
- Level on pyramid: Level 1
- Last champions: Main: FSV Frankfurt Hessen: FSV Mainz 05 (1932–32)

The Bezirksliga Main-Hessen was the highest association football league in the German state of Hesse and the Prussian province of Hesse-Nassau from 1927 to 1933. The league was disbanded with the rise of the Nazis to power in 1933.

== Overview ==
The league was formed in 1927, from the clubs of the Bezirksliga Main and the clubs of the north-eastern part of the Bezirksliga Rheinhessen-Saar. The clubs from the Bezirksliga Rheinhessen-Saar which did not become part of the new league were added to the new Bezirksliga Rhein-Saar instead. With the Viktoria Aschaffenburg, the league also included one club from Bavaria.

The league operated from the start in two regional divisions, the Main-division, named after the river Main and the Hessen-division, named after the region of Hesse. The first played with twelve, the second with ten clubs in its first season 1927-28. The clubs in each division played each other in a home-and-away round with the division winners advancing to the Southern German championship, which in turn was a qualification tournament for the German championship. A Bezirksliga final was not played.

The second and third placed team in each division qualified for another round, the Bezirksliga runners-up round, to determine one more team which would gain entry to the German finals.

The leagues were reduced to ten teams in the Main division and nine in the Hessen division in the following season but remained unchanged in modus otherwise. For the 1929-30 season, both divisions then operated on a strength of eight teams, a system that also applied in the following season.

In the 1931-32 season, both divisions expanded in strength, Main to eleven and Hessen to ten teams. The Southern German finals were also reorganised with the top two teams from each division advancing to the Northwest finals group.

In its last season, 1932–33, both divisions operated on a strength of ten clubs.

With the rise of the Nazis to power, the Gauligas were introduced as the highest football leagues in Germany. In the region, the Gauliga Südwest/Mainhessen replaced the Bezirksliga Main-Hessen as the highest level of play. The clubs from the Hanau and Friedberg region however were added to the new Gauliga Hessen.

== National success ==
=== Southern German championship ===
Qualified teams and their success:

- 1928:
  - VfL Neu-Isenburg, 6th place in the Bezirksliga-runners-up round
  - Rot-Weiß Frankfurt, 5th place in the Bezirksliga-runners-up round
  - FSV Mainz 05, 2nd place in the Bezirksliga-runners-up round
  - FSV Frankfurt, Winner of the Bezirksliga-runners-up round, loser division final
  - Wormatia Worms, 6th place
  - Eintracht Frankfurt, Runners-up
- 1929:
  - VfL Neu-Isenburg, 8th place in the Bezirksliga-runners-up round
  - Union Niederrad, 5th place in the Bezirksliga-runners-up round
  - FSV Mainz 05, 4th place in the Bezirksliga-runners-up round
  - FSV Frankfurt, Winner of the Bezirksliga-runners-up round, loser division final
  - Wormatia Worms, 7th place
  - Eintracht Frankfurt, 4th place
- 1930:
  - Rot-Weiß Frankfurt, 6th place in the Bezirksliga-runners-up round
  - VfL Neu-Isenburg, 5th place in the Bezirksliga-runners-up round
  - SV Wiesbaden, 3rd place in the Bezirksliga-runners-up round
  - FSV Frankfurt, Winner of the Bezirksliga-runners-up round, loser division final
  - Wormatia Worms, 7th place
  - Eintracht Frankfurt, Southern German champions
- 1931:
  - SV Wiesbaden, 8th place in the Bezirksliga-runners-up round
  - Union Niederrad, 5th place in the Bezirksliga-runners-up round
  - Rot-Weiß Frankfurt, 3rd place in the Bezirksliga-runners-up round
  - VfL Neu-Isenburg, 2nd place in the Bezirksliga-runners-up round
  - Wormatia Worms, 7th place
  - Eintracht Frankfurt, Runners-up
- 1932:
  - FSV Mainz 05, 8th place northwest division
  - Wormatia Worms, 3rd place northwest division
  - FSV Frankfurt, 2nd place northwest division, 4th place in Southern German championship
  - Eintracht Frankfurt, Southern German champions
- 1933:
  - FSV Mainz 05, 7th place northsouth division
  - Wormatia Worms, 3rd place northsouth division
  - Eintracht Frankfurt, 2nd place northsouth division, 3rd place in Southern German championship
  - FSV Frankfurt, Southern German champions

=== German championship ===
Qualified teams and their success:

- 1928:
  - Eintracht Frankfurt, First round
- 1929:
  - none qualified
- 1930:
  - Eintracht Frankfurt, Quarter-finals
- 1931:
  - Eintracht Frankfurt, Quarter-finals
- 1932:
  - Eintracht Frankfurt, Final
- 1933:
  - FSV Frankfurt, Quarter-finals
  - Eintracht Frankfurt, Semi-finals

== Founding members of the league ==
The 22 founding members of the league and their positions in the 1926-27 season were:

=== Main division ===
- Eintracht Frankfurt, runners-up Bezirksliga Main
- FSV Frankfurt, champions Bezirksliga Main
- Rot-Weiß Frankfurt, 4th Bezirksliga Main
- Union Niederrad, 8th Bezirksliga Main
- FC Hanau 93, 6th Bezirksliga Main
- Viktoria Aschaffenburg, 9th Bezirksliga Main
- Kickers Offenbach, 3rd Bezirksliga Main
- SpVgg Fechenheim, promoted from second tier
- Sport 1860 Hanau, promoted from second tier
- VfR Offenbach, promoted from second tier
- Viktoria Hanau, 10th Bezirksliga Main
- Germania 94 Frankfurt, 7th Bezirksliga Main

=== Hessen division ===
- Wormatia Worms, 3rd Bezirksliga Rheinhessen-Saar
- FSV Mainz 05, champions Bezirksliga Rheinhessen-Saar
- VfL Neu-Isenburg, 5th Bezirksliga Main
- SV Wiesbaden, 4th Bezirksliga Rheinhessen-Saar
- TSG Höchst, promoted from second tier
- Alemannia Worms, 8th Bezirksliga Rheinhessen-Saar
- Hassia Bingen, 5th Bezirksliga Rheinhessen-Saar
- SpVgg Arheiligen, promoted from second tier
- SV Darmstadt 98, 6th Bezirksliga Rhein
- Germania Wiesbaden, promoted from second tier

== Winners of the Bezirksliga Main-Hessen ==
Season	Main	Hessen
1927–28	Eintracht Frankfurt	Wormatia Worms
1928–29	Eintracht Frankfurt	Wormatia Worms
1929–30	Eintracht Frankfurt	Wormatia Worms
1930–31	Eintracht Frankfurt	Wormatia Worms
1931–32	Eintracht Frankfurt	FSV Mainz 05
1932–33	FSV Frankfurt	FSV Mainz 05

== Placings in the Bezirksliga Main-Hessen 1927-33 ==
=== Main division ===
Club	1928	1929	1930	1931	1932	1933
Eintracht Frankfurt	1	1	1	1	1	2
FSV Frankfurt	2	2	3	5	2	1
Rot-Weiß Frankfurt	3	7	2	3	3	7
Union Niederrad	4	3	4	2	4	4
FC Hanau 93	5	5	7	6	8	9
Viktoria Aschaffenburg	6	9				
Kickers Offenbach	7	4	5	4	5	3
SpVgg Fechenheim	8	8		8		
SpVgg Hanau	9	10				
VfR Offenbach	10					
Viktoria Hanau	11					
Germania 94 Frankfurt	12				11	
Germania Bieber		6	6	7	7	6
SpVgg Griesheim			8		10	
VfL Neu-Isenburg	x	x	x	x	6	5
FSV Heusenstamm					9	
Sportfreunde Frankfurt						8
VfB Friedberg						10

Source:"Bezirksliga Main-Hessen". Das deutsche Fussball-Archiv.

- The Sport 1860 Hanau and Viktoria Hanau merged in 1928 to form SpVgg Hanau.

=== Hessen division ===
Club	1928	1929	1930	1931	1932	1933
Wormatia Worms	1	1	1	1	2	2
FSV Mainz 05	2	2	4	5	1	1
VfL Neu-Isenburg	3	3	2	2	x	x
SV Wiesbaden	4	4	3	3	6	4
TSG Höchst	5	9				
Alemannia Worms	6	5	5	4	5	3
Hassia Bingen	7	6	8			
SpVgg Arheiligen	8	8				
SV Darmstadt 98	9		6	8	10	
Germania Wiesbaden	10					
FC Langen		7	7	6	4	8
Viktoria Urberach				7	8	10
FVgg Kastel					3	5
Olympia Lorsch					7	9
Viktoria Walldorf					9	
VfR Bürstadt						6
FVgg Mombach						7

Source:"Bezirksliga Main-Hessen". Das deutsche Fussball-Archiv.
