= Kreisliga Südwest =

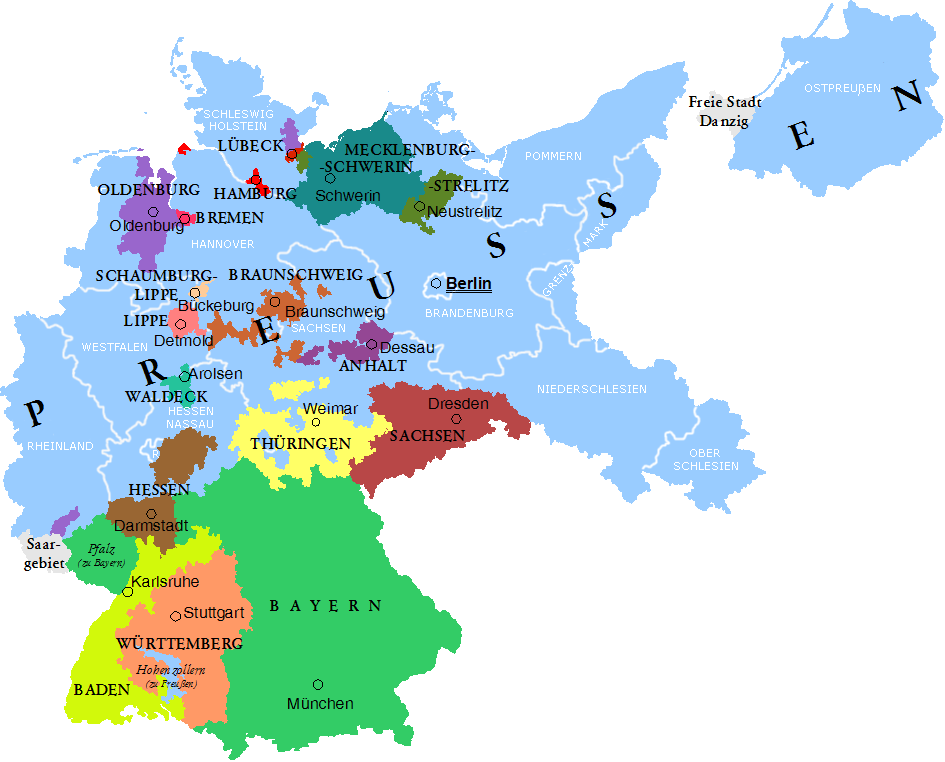
- Founded: 1919
- Folded: 1923
- Replaced by: Bezirksliga Württemberg-Baden
- Country: Germany
- State: Baden
- Level on pyramid: Level 1
- Last champions: 1. FC Pforzheim; (1922–23)

The Kreisliga Südwest (English: District league Southwest) was the highest association football league in the German state of Baden from 1919 to 1923. The league was disbanded with the introduction of the Bezirksliga Württemberg-Baden in 1923.

== Overview ==
=== Predecessor ===
From 1907, four regional leagues were formed within the structure of the Southern German football championship, in a move to improve the organisation of football in Southern Germany, these being:

- Ostkreis-Liga, covering Bavaria
- Nordkreis-Liga, covering Hesse
- Südkreis-Liga, covering Württemberg, Baden and Alsace
- Westkreis-Liga, covering the Palatinate, Lorraine and the southern Rhine Province

In 1908, a first Südkreis-Liga (English: Southern District League) was established, consisting of ten clubs and playing a home-and-away season. With the outbreak of the First World War, league football came to a halt and, during the war, games were only played on a limited level.

=== Post-First World War ===
With the collapse of the German Empire in 1918, no Württemberg championship was played in 1918-19 but football returned to a more organised system in 1919.

Southern Germany, now without the Alsace region, which had to be returned to France, was sub-divided into ten Kreisligas, these being:

- Kreisliga Hessen
- Kreisliga Nordbayern
- Kreisliga Nordmain
- Kreisliga Odenwald
- Kreisliga Pfalz
- Kreisliga Saar
- Kreisliga Südbayern
- Kreisliga Südmain
- Kreisliga Südwest
- Kreisliga Württemberg

The Südkreis-Liga was split into three regional competitions, Württemberg, Odenwald and Südwest, each with ten clubs. The three league winners advanced to the Southern championship. This system applied for the 1919-20 and 1920-21 season.

In 1921-22, the Kreisliga Südwest was split into two groups of eight, increasing the number of tier-one clubs in the region to 16. The two league winners then played a final to determine the Südwest champion, which in turn advanced to a Baden-Württemberg championship final against the Württemberg champion. The Odenwald champion was not part of this series but rather played a Rhine championship. This "watering down" of Südwest football lasted for only one season, in 1922-23, the number of top clubs was reduced to eight clubs in a single division, with a Baden-Württemberg final against the Württemberg champion once more.

In 1923, a league reform which was decided upon in Darmstadt, Hesse, established the Southern German Bezirksligas which were to replace the Kreisligas. The best four teams each from the Südwest and Württemberg were admitted to the new Bezirksliga Württemberg-Baden. The four clubs from the Südwest were:

- 1. FC Pforzheim
- Freiburger FC
- Phönix Karlsruhe
- FC Mühlburg

== National success ==
The clubs from the Kreisliga Südwest were not particularly successful in this era and none managed to qualify for the German championship.

=== Baden-Württemberg championship ===
Played in 1922 and 1923, these were the finals:

- 1922:
  - Südwest final: Karlsruher FV - Phönix Karlsruhe 2-2 / 3-2
  - Baden-Württemberg final: Sportfreunde Stuttgart - Karlsruher FV 1-0 / 1-1
- 1923:
  - Baden-Württemberg final: 1. FC Pforzheim - Stuttgarter Kickers 3-0 / 1-1

=== Southern German championship ===
Qualified teams and their success:

- 1920:
  - Freiburger FC, Semi-finals
- 1921:
  - 1. FC Pforzheim, Semi-finals
- 1922:
  - Karlsruher FV, not qualified
- 1923:
  - 1. FC Pforzheim, 4th place

== Winners and runners-up of the Kreisliga Südwest ==
Season	North	Runner-Up
1919–20	Freiburger FC	1. FC Pforzheim
1920–21	1. FC Pforzheim	Freiburger FC
1921–22	Karlsruher FV	Phönix Karlsruhe
1922–23	1. FC Pforzheim	Freiburger FC

== Placings in the Kreisliga Südwest 1919-23 ==
Club	1920	1921	1922	1923
Freiburger FC	1	2	2	2
1. FC Pforzheim	2	1	2	1
Karlsruher FV	3	3	1	5
Phönix Karlsruhe	4	5	1	3
FC Mühlburg	5	8	3	4
FV Beiertheim	6	9	6	
VfB Karlsruhe	7	7	3	8
VfR Pforzheim	8	10	7	
BSC Pforzheim	9			
Spgg. Freiburg	10			
Germania Brötzingen		4	4	7
SC Freiburg		6	4	6
Germania Durlach			5	
SC Pforzheim			8	
FC Birkenfeld			5	
Frankonia Karlsruhe			6	
Offenburger FV			7	
FV Lörrach			8	
