= Kreisliga Odenwald =

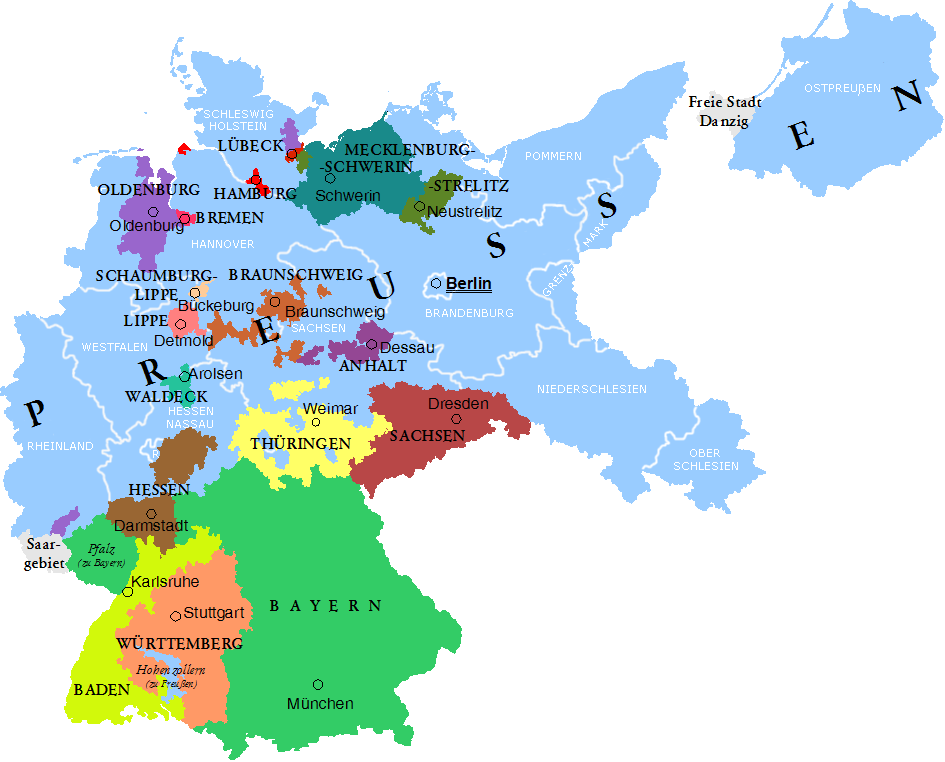
- Founded: 1919
- Folded: 1923
- Replaced by: Bezirksliga Rhein
- Country: Germany
- State: Baden; People's State of Hesse
- Level on pyramid: Level 1
- Last champions: Phönix Mannheim (1922–23)

The Kreisliga Odenwald (English: District league Odenwald) was the highest association football league in the northern part of the German state of Baden and the southern part of the state of Hesse from 1919 to 1923. The league was disbanded with the introduction of the Bezirksliga Rhein in 1923.

The league was named after the Odenwald, a forest in the border region of Hesse and Baden.

== Overview ==
=== Predecessor ===
From 1907, four regional leagues were formed within the structure of the Southern German football championship, in a move to improve the organisation of football in Southern Germany, these being:

- Ostkreis-Liga, covering Bavaria
- Nordkreis-Liga, covering Hesse
- Südkreis-Liga, covering Württemberg, Baden and Alsace
- Westkreis-Liga, covering the Palatinate, Lorraine and the southern Rhine Province

In 1908, a first Westkreis-Liga (English: Western District League) was established. With the outbreak of the First World War, league football came to a halt and, during the war, games were only played on a limited level.

=== Post-First World War ===
With the collapse of the German Empire in 1918, no Westkreis championship was played in 1918-19 but football returned to a more organised system in 1919.

Southern Germany, now without the Alsace and Lorraine regions, the later having been part of the Westkreis and had to be returned to France, was sub-divided into ten Kreisligas, these being:

- Kreisliga Hessen
- Kreisliga Nordbayern
- Kreisliga Nordmain
- Kreisliga Odenwald
- Kreisliga Pfalz
- Kreisliga Saar
- Kreisliga Südbayern
- Kreisliga Südmain
- Kreisliga Südwest
- Kreisliga Württemberg

The new Kreisliga Odenwald was made up from ten clubs from the Westkreis region. The league winners of the Kreisligas advanced to the Southern championship. This system applied for the 1919-20 and 1920-21 season.

In 1921-22, the Kreisliga Odenwald was split into two groups of eight, increasing the number of tier-one clubs in the region to 16. The two league winners then played a final to determine the Odenwald champion, which in turn advanced to a Rhein championship final against the Pfalz champion. This "watering down" of football in the region lasted for only one season, in 1922-23, the number of top clubs was reduced to eight clubs in a single division, with a Rhein final against the Pfalz champion once more.

In 1923, a league reform which was decided upon in Darmstadt, Hesse, established the Southern German Bezirksligas which were to replace the Kreisligas. The best four teams each from the Kreisliga Odenwald and Pfalz were admitted to the new Bezirksliga Rhein. The four clubs from Odenwald were:

- Phönix Mannheim
- SV Waldhof Mannheim
- VfR Mannheim
- VfTuR Feudenheim

== National success ==
The clubs from the Kreisliga Odenwald were not particularly successful in this era and none managed to qualify for the German championship.

=== Rhein championship ===
Played in 1922 and 1923, these were the finals:

- 1922:
  - Odenwald final: VfR Mannheim - Lindenhof 08 5-0 / 1-1
  - Rhein final: VfR Mannheim - Phönix Ludwigshafen 0-0 / 3-2
- 1923:
  - Rhein: Phönix Ludwigshafen - Phönix Mannheim 4-1 / 3-1

=== Southern German championship ===
Qualified teams and their success:

- 1920:
  - SV Waldhof Mannheim, Group stage
- 1921:
  - SV Waldhof Mannheim, Group stage
- 1922:
  - VfR Mannheim, Second round
- 1923:
  - Borussia Neunkirchen, not qualified

== Winners and runners-up of the Kreisliga Odenwald ==
Season	Champions	Runner-Up
1919–20	SV Waldhof Mannheim	VfR Mannheim
1920–21	SV Waldhof Mannheim	VfR Mannheim
1921–22	VfR Mannheim	Lindenhof 08
1922–23	Phönix Mannheim	SV Waldhof Mannheim

== Placings in the Kreisliga Odenwald 1919-23 ==
Club	1920	1921	1922	1923
SV Waldhof Mannheim	1	1	2	2
VfR Mannheim	2	2	1	3
Phönix Mannheim	3	6	3	1
VfL Neckarau	4	3	3	5
VfTuR Feudenheim	5	4	2	4
Viktoria Aschaffenburg ^{1}	6			
SC Käfertal	7	7		
Spgg Sandhofen	8	5	5	
SV Darmstadt 98	9	9	4	8
VfB Heidelberg	10		5	
Mannheim 07		8	4	7
SV Schwetzingen		10	7	
Lindenhof 08			1	6
Germania Pfungstadt			6	
VfR Bürstadt			8	
Hertha Mannheim			6	
Germania Friedrichsfeld			8	

- ^{1} Viktoria moved from the Kreisliga Odenwald to the Kreisliga Nordmain in 1920 and then to the Kreisliga Südmain in 1921.
