= Kreisliga Saar =

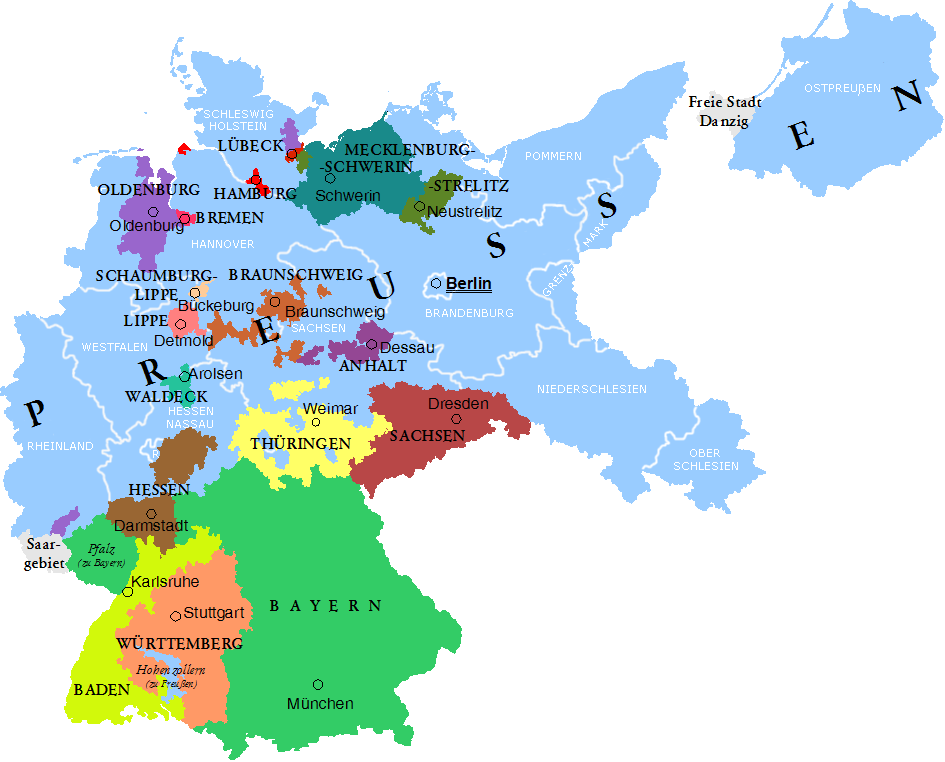
- Founded: 1919
- Folded: 1923
- Replaced by: Bezirksliga Rheinhessen-Saar
- Country: Germany
- State: Palatinate; Territory of the Saar Basin; Rhine Province
- Level on pyramid: Level 1
- Last champions: Borussia Neunkirchen (1922–23)

The Kreisliga Saar (English: District league Saar) was the highest association football league in the Territory of the Saar Basin, governed by a League of Nations mandate, and parts of the Bavarian region of Palatinate and the Prussian Rhine Province from 1919 to 1923. The league was disbanded with the introduction of the Bezirksliga Rheinhessen-Saar in 1923.

The league was named after the Saar River.

== Overview ==
=== Predecessor ===
From 1907, four regional leagues were formed within the structure of the Southern German football championship, in a move to improve the organisation of football in Southern Germany, these being:

- Ostkreis-Liga, covering Bavaria
- Nordkreis-Liga, covering Hesse
- Südkreis-Liga, covering Württemberg, Baden and Alsace
- Westkreis-Liga, covering the Palatinate, Lorraine and the southern Rhine Province

In 1908, a first Westkreis-Liga (English: Western District League) was established. With the outbreak of the First World War, league football came to a halt and, during the war, games were only played on a limited level.

=== Post-First World War ===
With the collapse of the German Empire in 1918, no Westkreis championship was played in 1918-19 but football returned to a more organised system in 1919.

Southern Germany, now without the Alsace and Lorraine regions, the later having been part of the Westkreis and had to be returned to France, was sub-divided into ten Kreisligas, these being:

- Kreisliga Hessen
- Kreisliga Nordbayern
- Kreisliga Nordmain
- Kreisliga Odenwald
- Kreisliga Pfalz
- Kreisliga Saar
- Kreisliga Südbayern
- Kreisliga Südmain
- Kreisliga Südwest
- Kreisliga Württemberg

The new Kreisliga Saar was made up from eight clubs from the Westkreis region. The league winners of the Kreisligas advanced to the Southern championship. This system applied for the 1919–20 and 1920–21 season, with the league being expanded to ten clubs for the later.

In 1921–22, the Kreisliga Saar was split into two groups of eight, increasing the number of tier-one clubs in the region to 16. The two league winners then played a final to determine the Saar champion, which in turn advanced to a Rheinhessen-Saar championship final against the Hessen champion. This "watering down" of football in the region lasted for only one season, in 1922–23, the number of top clubs was reduced to eight clubs in a single division, with a Rheinhessen-Saar final against the Hessen champion once more.

In 1923, a league reform which was decided upon in Darmstadt, Hesse, established the Southern German Bezirksligas which were to replace the Kreisligas. The best four teams each from the Kreisliga Hessen and Saar were admitted to the new Bezirksliga Rheinhessen-Saar. The four clubs from Saar were:

- Borussia Neunkirchen
- FV Saarbrücken
- 1. FC Idar
- SV Trier 05

== National success ==
The clubs from the Kreisliga Saar were not particularly successful in this era and none managed to qualify for the German championship. Borussia Neunkirchen did however reach the final of the Southern German Championship in 1922, to lose 2–1 after extra time to FC Wacker München.

=== Rheinhessen-Saar championship ===
Played in 1922 and 1923, these were the finals:

- 1922:
  - Saar final: Borussia Neunkirchen - Saar 05 Saarbrücken 2-1 / 0–0
  - Rheinhessen-Saar final: Borussia Neunkirchen - SV Wiesbaden 3-1 / 3–0
- 1923:
  - Rheinhessen-Saar final: Borussia Neunkirchen - SV Wiesbaden 0-0 / 2-2 / 3–0

=== Southern German championship ===
Qualified teams and their success:

- 1920:
  - Saar 05 Saarbrücken, Group stage
- 1921:
  - Borussia Neunkirchen, Group stage
- 1922:
  - Borussia Neunkirchen, Runners-up
- 1923:
  - Borussia Neunkirchen, not qualified

== Winners and runners-up of the Kreisliga Saar ==
Season	Champions	Runner-Up
1919–20	Saar 05 Saarbrücken	Borussia Neunkirchen
1920–21	Borussia Neunkirchen	Saar 05 Saarbrücken
1921–22	Borussia Neunkirchen	Saar 05 Saarbrücken
1922–23	Borussia Neunkirchen	FV Saarbrücken

== Placings in the Kreisliga Saar 1919-23 ==
Club	1920	1921	1922	1923
Saar 05 Saarbrücken	1	2	1	5
Borussia Neunkirchen	2	1	1	1
FV Kaiserslautern	3			
FK Pirmasens	4			
SV Trier 05	5	4	2	4
FV Saarbrücken	6	6	4	2
SC Pirmasens 05	7			
SV Völklingen	8	8	3	6
TV Burbach		3	2	7
SV Sulzbach		5	7	
FV Kreuznach 07		7		
Oberstein 08		9	4	8
FC Kreuznach 02		10		
1. FC Idar			3	3
SV Altenkessel			5	
SV 05 Saarbrücken			6	
VfR Kirn			8	
Eintracht Trier			5	
SV Elversberg			6	
SC Merzig			7	
Hansa Dudweiler			8	
