= Kreisliga Nordmain =

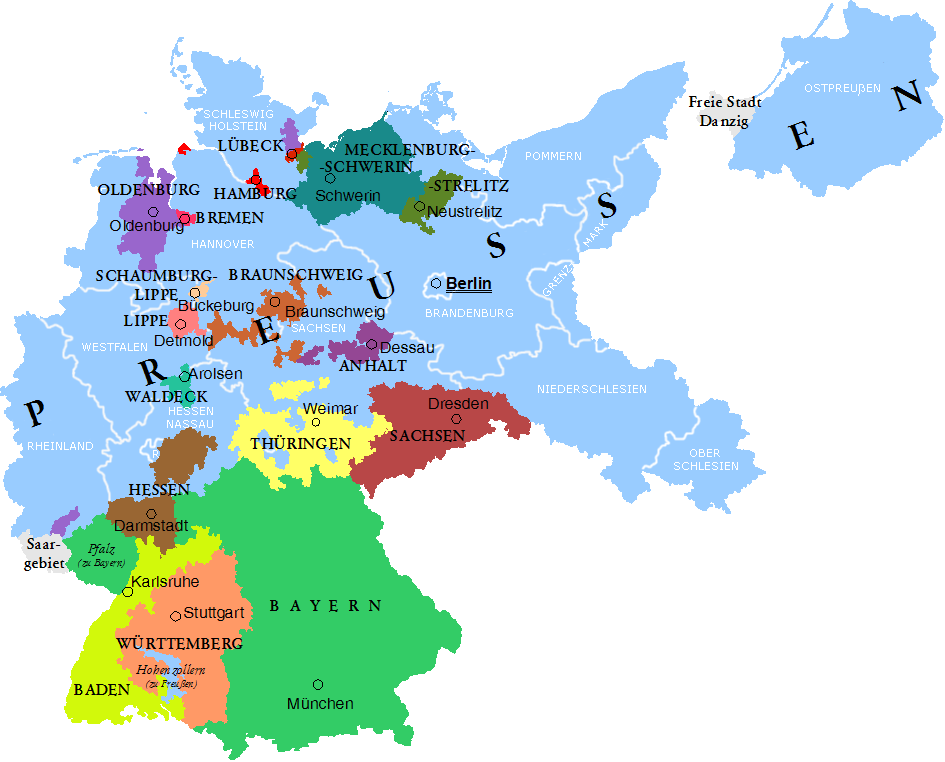
- Founded: 1919
- Folded: 1923
- Replaced by: Bezirksliga Main
- Country: Germany
- State: People's State of Hesse; Hesse-Nassau
- Level on pyramid: Level 1
- Last champions: FSV Frankfurt (1922–23)

The Kreisliga Nordmain (English: District league North Main) was the highest association football league in parts of the German state of Hesse and the Prussian province of Hesse-Nassau from 1919 to 1923. The league was disbanded with the introduction of the Bezirksliga Main in 1923.

The league is named after the river Main, which flows through Frankfurt am Main and reaches the Rhine near Mainz. The league was formed from clubs from the northern side of the river. With a club from Aschaffenburg, it also included a team from the Bavaria.

== Overview ==
=== Predecessor ===
From 1907, four regional leagues were formed within the structure of the Southern German football championship, in a move to improve the organisation of football in Southern Germany, these being:

- Ostkreis-Liga, covering Bavaria
- Nordkreis-Liga, covering Hesse
- Südkreis-Liga, covering Württemberg, Baden and Alsace
- Westkreis-Liga, covering the Palatinate, Lorraine and the southern Rhine Province

In 1908, a first Nordkreis-Liga (English: Northern District League) was established, consisting of ten clubs and playing a home-and-away season. With the outbreak of the First World War, league football came to a halt and, during the war, games were only played on a limited level.

=== Post-First World War ===
With the collapse of the German Empire in 1918, no Nordkreis championship was played in 1918-19 but football returned to a more organised system in 1919.

Southern Germany, now without the Alsace region, which had to be returned to France, was sub-divided into ten Kreisligas, these being:

- Kreisliga Hessen
- Kreisliga Nordbayern
- Kreisliga Nordmain
- Kreisliga Odenwald
- Kreisliga Pfalz
- Kreisliga Saar
- Kreisliga Südbayern
- Kreisliga Südmain
- Kreisliga Südwest
- Kreisliga Württemberg

The clubs of the former Nordkreis-Liga were split into three regional competitions, Nordmain, Südmain and Hessen, each with ten clubs. The three league winners advanced to the Southern championship. This system applied for the 1919–20 and 1920–21 seasons, except that Nordmain had eleven clubs in 1920–21.

In 1921–22, the Kreisliga Nordmain was split into two groups of eight, increasing the number of tier-one clubs in the region to 16. The two league winners then played a final to determine the Nordmain champion, which in turn advanced to a Main championship final against the Südmain champion. The Hessen champion was not part of this series but rather played a Rhinehesse/Saar championship. This "watering down" of football in the region lasted for only one season, in 1922–23, the number of top clubs was reduced to eight clubs in a single division, with a Main final against the Südmain champion once more.

In 1923, a league reform which was decided upon in Darmstadt, Hesse, established the Southern German Bezirksligas which were to replace the Kreisligas. The best four teams each from the Südmain and Nordmain were admitted to the new Bezirksliga Main. The four clubs from Nordmain were:

- FSV Frankfurt
- Helvetia Frankfurt
- Eintracht Frankfurt
- FC Hanau 93

== National success ==
The clubs from the Kreisliga Nordmain were not particularly successful in this era and none managed to qualify for the German championship.

=== Main championship ===
Played in 1922 and 1923, these were the finals:

- 1922:
  - Nordmain final: Germania 94 Frankfurt - Eintracht Frankfurt 4-1 / 2-2
  - Main final: Germania 94 Frankfurt - VfL Neu-Isenburg 1-0 / 0-3 / 4-2
- 1923:
  - Main final: FSV Frankfurt - Kickers Offenbach 0-1 / 7-2 / 2-1

=== Southern German championship ===
Qualified teams and their success:

- 1920:
  - Frankfurter FV, Group stage
- 1921:
  - Eintracht Frankfurt, Group stage
- 1922:
  - Germania 94 Frankfurt, Semi-finals
- 1923:
  - FSV Frankfurt, Group stage

== Winners and runners-up of the Kreisliga Nordmain ==
Season	Champions	Runner-Up
1919-20	Frankfurter FV	FSV Frankfurt
1920-21	Eintracht Frankfurt	Germania 94 Frankfurt
1921-22	Germania 94 Frankfurt	Eintracht Frankfurt
1922-23	FSV Frankfurt	Helvetia Frankfurt

== Placings in the Kreisliga Nordmain 1919-23 ==
Club	1920	1921	1922	1923
Eintracht Frankfurt ^{1}	1	1	1	3
FSV Frankfurt	2	8	2	1
VfR Frankfurt	3	4	4	5
Sportfreunde Frankfurt	4	10	3	6
FC Hanau 93	5	9	3	4
Helvetia Frankfurt	6	5	2	2
Viktoria 94 Frankfurt	7	6		
Germania 94 Frankfurt	8	2	1	7
FV Großauheim	9			
FC Langendiebach	10			
Viktoria Aschaffenburg ^{2}		3		
Germania Rückingen		7	6	
FG Seckbach		11	7	
VfB Großauheim			5	
Borussia Frankfurt			6	
VfB Friedberg			8	
Viktoria 1894 Hanau			4	8
FC Rödelheim			5	
Fechenheim 03			7	
Germania Niederrodenbach			8	

- ^{1} Frankfurter FV became Eintracht Frankfurt in 1920.
- ^{2} Viktoria moved from the Kreisliga Odenwald to the Kreisliga Nordmain in 1920 and then to the Kreisliga Südmain in 1921.
