= Kreisliga Pfalz =

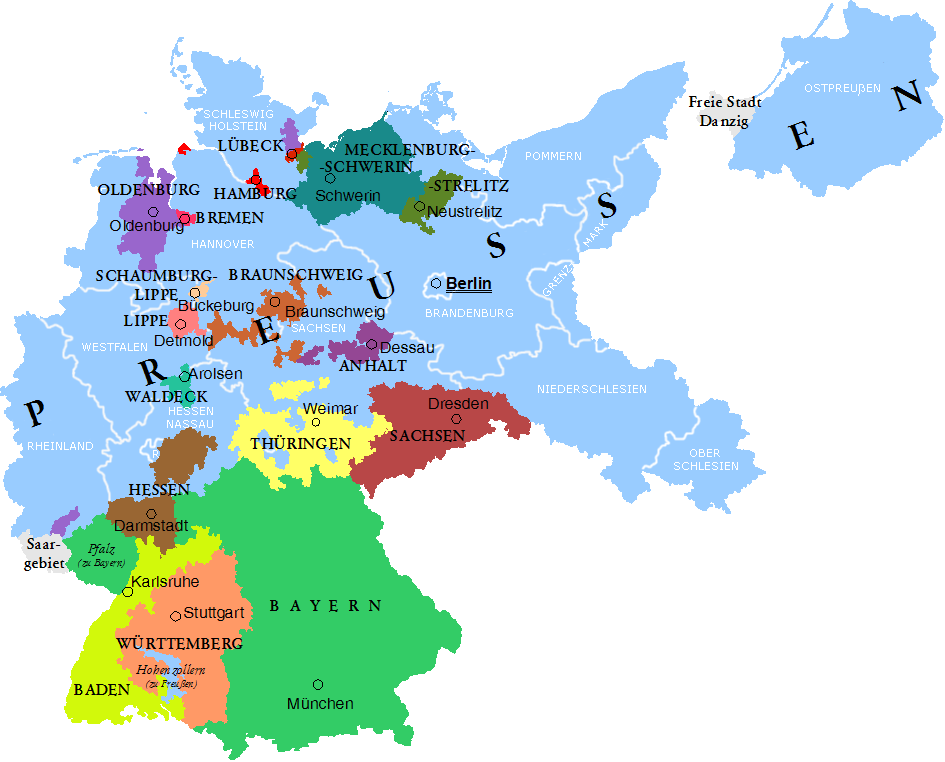
- Founded: 1919
- Folded: 1923
- Replaced by: Bezirksliga Rhein
- Country: Germany
- State: Palatinate
- Level on pyramid: Level 1
- Last champions: Phönix Ludwigshafen (1922–23)

The Kreisliga Pfalz (English: District league Palatinate) was the highest association football league in the Bavarian region of Palatinate from 1919 to 1923. The league was disbanded with the introduction of the Bezirksliga Rhein in 1923.

== Overview ==
=== Predecessor ===
From 1907, four regional leagues were formed within the structure of the Southern German football championship, in a move to improve the organisation of football in Southern Germany, these being:

- Ostkreis-Liga, covering Bavaria
- Nordkreis-Liga, covering Hesse
- Südkreis-Liga, covering Württemberg, Baden and Alsace
- Westkreis-Liga, covering the Palatinate, Lorraine and the southern Rhine Province

In 1908, a first Westkreis-Liga (English: Western District League) was established. With the outbreak of the First World War, league football came to a halt and, during the war, games were only played on a limited level.

=== Post-First World War ===
With the collapse of the German Empire in 1918, no Westkreis championship was played in 1918-19 but football returned to a more organised system in 1919.

Southern Germany, now without the Alsace and Lorraine regions, the later having been part of the Westkreis and had to be returned to France, was sub-divided into ten Kreisligas, these being:

- Kreisliga Hessen
- Kreisliga Nordbayern
- Kreisliga Nordmain
- Kreisliga Odenwald
- Kreisliga Pfalz
- Kreisliga Saar
- Kreisliga Südbayern
- Kreisliga Südmain
- Kreisliga Südwest
- Kreisliga Württemberg

The new Kreisliga Pfalz was made up from eight clubs from the Westkreis region. The league winners of the Kreisligas advanced to the Southern championship. This system applied for the 1919-20 and 1920-21 season, with the league expanding to ten clubs for the later.

In 1921-22, the Kreisliga Pfalz was split into two groups of eight, increasing the number of tier-one clubs in the region to 16. The two league winners then played a final to determine the Pfalz champion, which in turn advanced to a Rhein championship final against the Odenwald champion. This "watering down" of football in the region lasted for only one season, in 1922-23, the number of top clubs was reduced to eight clubs in a single division, with a Rhein final against the Odenwald champion once more.

In 1923, a league reform which was decided upon in Darmstadt, Hesse, established the Southern German Bezirksligas which were to replace the Kreisligas. The best four teams each from the Kreisliga Odenwald and Pfalz were admitted to the new Bezirksliga Rhein. The four clubs from Pfalz were:

- Phönix Ludwigshafen
- Pfalz Ludwigshafen
- FG 03 Ludwigshafen
- FK Pirmasens

== National success ==
No club from the Kreisliga Pfalz managed to qualify for the German championship but in three out of four years, the Pfalz champion reached the final of the Southern German championship to lose to the Bavarian representative.

=== Rhein championship ===
Played in 1922 and 1923, these were the finals:

- 1922:
  - Pfalz final: Phönix Ludwigshafen - FG 03 Ludwigshafen 1-0 / 2-4 / 3-2
  - Rhein final: VfR Mannheim - Phönix Ludwigshafen 0-0 / 3-2
- 1923:
  - Rhein: Phönix Ludwigshafen - Phönix Mannheim 4-1 / 3-1

=== Southern German championship ===
Qualified teams and their success:

- 1920:
  - Pfalz Ludwigshafen, Runners-up
- 1921:
  - Phönix Ludwigshafen, Runners-up
- 1922:
  - Phönix Ludwigshafen, not qualified
- 1923:
  - Phönix Ludwigshafen, Runners-up

== Winners and runners-up of the Kreisliga Pfalz ==
Season	Champions	Runner-Up
1919–20	Pfalz Ludwigshafen	Phönix Ludwigshafen
1920–21	Phönix Ludwigshafen	FG 03 Ludwigshafen
1921–22	Phönix Ludwigshafen	FG 03 Ludwigshafen
1922–23	Phönix Ludwigshafen	Pfalz Ludwigshafen

== Placings in the Kreisliga Pfalz 1919-23 ==
Club	1920	1921	1922	1923
Pfalz Ludwigshafen	1	3	3	2
Phönix Ludwigshafen	2	1	1	1
FG 03 Ludwigshafen	3	2	1	3
FV Frankenthal	4	4	3	6
SC Ludwigshafen 04	5	5	5	
Alemannia Worms	6			
Wormatia Worms	7			
Arminia Rheingönheim	8		5	
FK Pirmasens		6	2	4
SC Pirmasens 05		7	6	
FV Kaiserslautern		8	2	7
VfR Kaiserslautern		9	4	5
FV Speyer		10	6	
Viktoria St. Ingbert			7	
Pirmasens 1863			8	
VB Zweibrücken			4	8
MTV Pirmasens			7	
Union Ludwigshafen			8	
