= Kreisliga Württemberg =

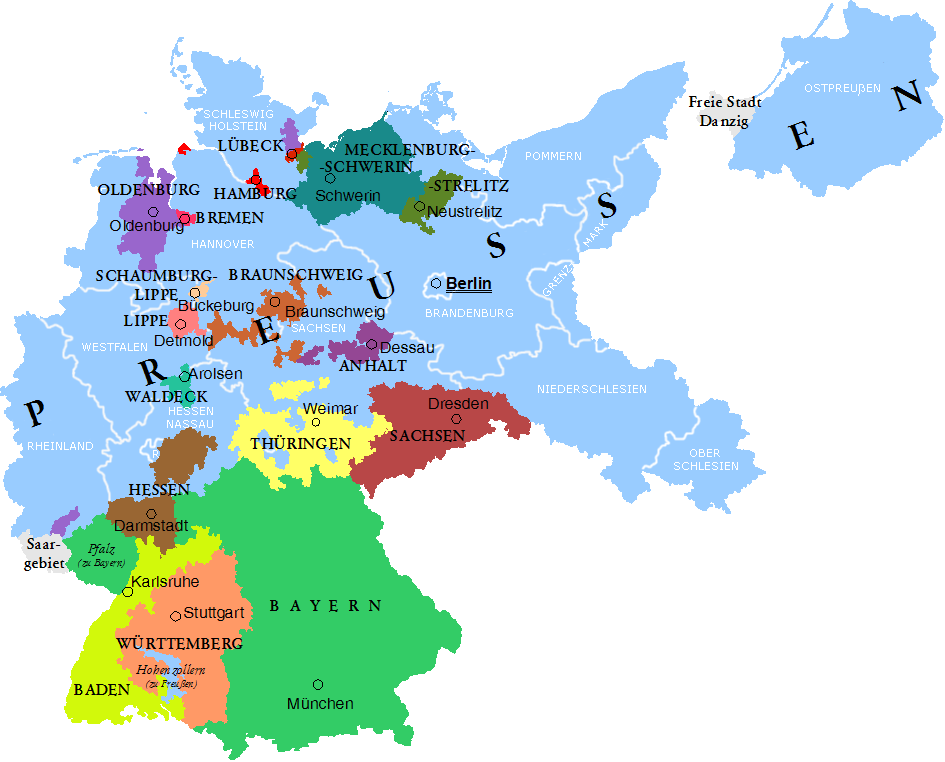
- Founded: 1919
- Folded: 1923
- Replaced by: Bezirksliga Württemberg-Baden
- Country: Germany
- State: Province of Hohenzollern; Württemberg
- Level on pyramid: Level 1
- Last champions: Stuttgarter Kickers (1922–23)

The Kreisliga Württemberg (English: District league Württemberg) was the highest association football league in the German state of Württemberg from 1919 to 1923. The league was disbanded with the introduction of the Bezirksliga Württemberg-Baden in 1923.

== Overview ==
=== Predecessor ===
From 1907, four regional leagues were formed within the structure of the Southern German football championship, in a move to improve the organisation of football in Southern Germany, these being:

- Ostkreis-Liga, covering Bavaria
- Nordkreis-Liga, covering Hesse
- Südkreis-Liga, covering Württemberg, Baden and Alsace
- Westkreis-Liga, covering the Palatinate, Lorraine and the southern Rhine Province

In 1908, a first Südkreis-Liga (English: Southern District League) was established, consisting of ten clubs and playing a home-and-away season. With the outbreak of the First World War, league football came to a halt and, during the war, games were only played on a limited level.

=== Post-First World War ===
With the collapse of the German Empire in 1918, no Württemberg championship was played in 1918-19 but football returned to a more organised system in 1919.

Southern Germany, now without the Alsace region, which had to be returned to France, was sub-divided into ten Kreisligas, these being:

- Kreisliga Hessen
- Kreisliga Nordbayern
- Kreisliga Nordmain
- Kreisliga Odenwald
- Kreisliga Pfalz
- Kreisliga Saar
- Kreisliga Südbayern
- Kreisliga Südmain
- Kreisliga Südwest
- Kreisliga Württemberg

The Südkreis-Liga was split into three regional competitions, Württemberg, Odenwald and Südwest, each with ten clubs. The three league winners advanced to the Southern championship. This system applied for the 1919-20 and 1920-21 season.

In 1921-22, the Kreisliga Württemberg was split into two groups of eight, increasing the number of tier-one clubs in Württemberg to 16. The two league winners then played a final to determine the Württemberg champion, which in turn advanced to a Baden-Württemberg championship final against the Südwest champion. The Odenwald champion was not part of this series but rather played a Rhine championship. This "watering down" of Württemberg football lasted for only one season, in 1922-23, the number of top clubs was reduced to eight clubs in a single division, with a Baden-Württemberg final against the Südwest champion once more.

In 1923, a league reform which was decided upon in Darmstadt, Hesse, established the Southern German Bezirksligas which were to replace the Kreisligas. The best four teams each from the Südwest and Württemberg were admitted to the new Bezirksliga Württemberg-Baden. The four clubs from Württemberg were:

- Stuttgarter Kickers
- SV Feuerbach
- VfR Heilbronn
- SC Stuttgart

== National success ==
The clubs from the Kreisliga Württemberg were not particularly successful in this era and none managed to qualify for the German championship.

=== Baden-Württemberg championship ===
Played in 1922 and 1923, these were the finals:

- 1922:
  - Württemberg final: Sportfreunde Stuttgart - Stuttgarter Kickers 1-0 / 3-2
  - Baden-Württemberg final: Sportfreunde Stuttgart - Karlsruher FV 1-0 / 1-1
- 1923:
  - Baden-Württemberg final: 1. FC Pforzheim - Stuttgarter Kickers 3-0 / 1-1

=== Southern German championship ===
Qualified teams and their success:

- 1920:
  - SC Stuttgart, Group stage
- 1921:
  - Stuttgarter Kickers, Group stage
- 1922:
  - Sportfreunde Stuttgart, Semi-finals
- 1923:
  - Stuttgarter Kickers, not qualified

== Winners and runners-up of the Kreisliga Württemberg ==
Season	Champions	Runner-Up
1919-20	SC Stuttgart	Stuttgarter Kickers
1920–21	Stuttgarter Kickers	SV Feuerbach
1921–22	Sportfreunde Stuttgart	Stuttgarter Kickers
1922–23	Stuttgarter Kickers	SV Feuerbach

== Placings in the Kreisliga Württemberg 1919-23 ==
Club	1920	1921	1922	1923
SC Stuttgart	1	3	4	5
Stuttgarter Kickers	2	1	1	1
Sportfreunde Stuttgart	3	4	1	3
SV Feuerbach	4	2	4	2
VfB Stuttgart	5	5	2	6
VfR Heilbronn	6	6	2	4
FV Ulm 94	7	8	3	8
FV Zuffenhausen	8	9	8	
Spgg. Tübingen	9		6	
FV Kornwestheim	10			
Spgg. Cannstatt		7	6	
Union Böckingen		10	7	
TB Ulm			5	
Pfeil Gaisburg			7	
Eintracht Stuttgart			3	7
Normannia Gmünd			5	
VfL Stuttgart			8	
