= Bezirksliga Württemberg-Baden =

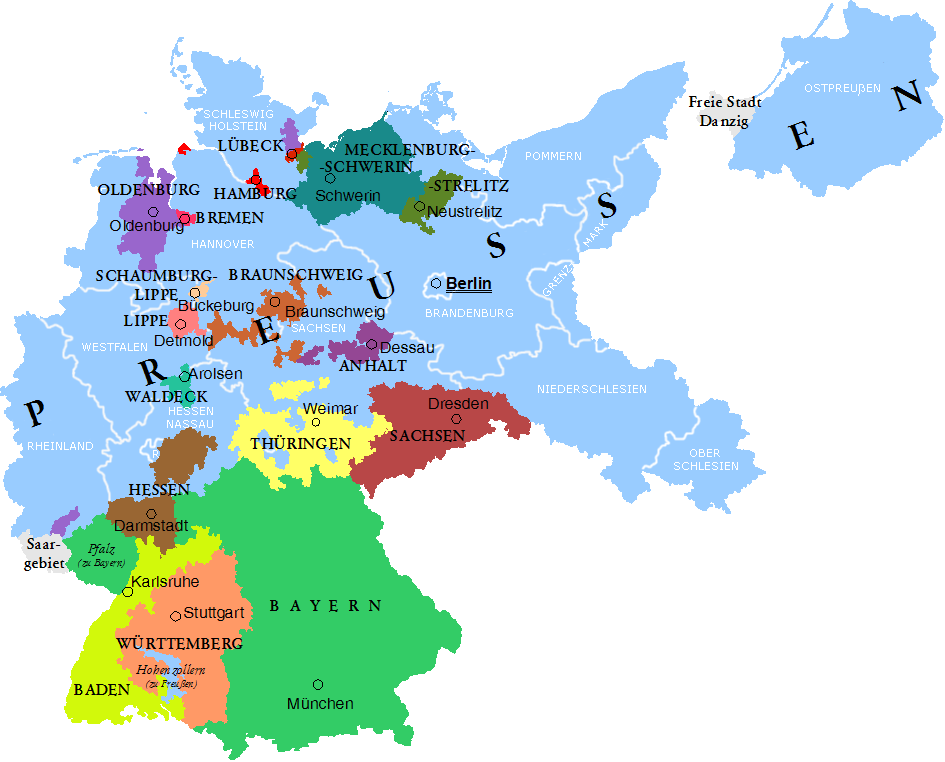
- Founded: 1923
- Folded: 1933
- Replaced by: Gauliga Württemberg Gauliga Baden
- Country: Germany
- State: Province of Hohenzollern; Württemberg; Baden
- Level on pyramid: Level 1
- Last champions: Baden: Phönix Karlsruhe Württemberg: Stuttgarter Kickers (1932–33)

The Bezirksliga Württemberg-Baden was the highest association football league in the German states of Württemberg and Baden and the Prussian Province of Hohenzollern from 1923 to 1933. The league was disbanded with the rise of the Nazis to power in 1933.

== Overview ==
The league was formed in 1923, after a league reform which was decided upon in Darmstadt, Hesse. It replaced the Kreisliga Südwest and the Kreisliga Württemberg as the highest leagues in the region.

The league started out with eight clubs from the two states and the Prussian province in the region, but without clubs from the Ulm, who were playing in the Bezirksliga Bayern and Mannheim, who played in the Bezirksliga Rhein instead. The eight clubs played each other in a home-and-away round with the top team advancing to the Southern German championship, which in turn was a qualification tournament for the German championship.

For the second and third seasons, 1924–25 and 1925–26, the modus remained unchanged.

For the 1926-27 season, the league was expanded to ten teams. The top team was again qualified for the finals. The runners-up of the Bezirksligas in the south from then on also played a championship round to determine a third team from the region to go to the German finals with the Karlsruher FV from the region qualifying for this.

After this season, the league was split into a Württemberg and a Baden group, the first having nine and the second eight teams. No final was played between the two group winners as both went on to the Southern German championship. The second and third placed team of each division would also advance to the separate round of the runners-up like in the previous season.

The 1928-29 season saw no change in modus but both leagues now operated on a strength of eight clubs. The qualification system for the finals also remained unchanged. This system remained in place until 1931.

For the 1931-32 season, both divisions were expanded to ten teams. The top-two teams from each league then advanced to the Southern German finals, which were now staged in two regional groups with a finals game between the two group winners at the end. The same system applied for the final season of the league in 1932-33.

With the rise of the Nazis to power, the Gauligas were introduced as the highest football leagues in Germany. In Württemberg-Baden, the Gauliga Württemberg and the Gauliga Baden replaced the Bezirksliga as the highest level of play.

== National success ==
The clubs from the Bezirksliga Württemberg-Baden did not manage to win a German championship in this era and were dominated by the much stronger competition from the Bezirksliga Bayern.

=== Southern German championship ===
- 1924:
  - Stuttgarter Kickers, 3rd place
- 1925:
  - Stuttgarter Kickers, 4th place
- 1926:
  - Karlsruher FV, 6th place
- 1927:
  - Karlsruher FV, 2nd place in the Bezirksliga-runners-up round
  - VfB Stuttgart, 5th place
- 1928:
  - Phönix Karlsruhe, 8th place in the Bezirksliga-runners-up round southwest division
  - Union Böckingen, 6th place in the Bezirksliga-runners-up round southwest division
  - SC Freiburg, 5th place in the Bezirksliga-runners-up round southwest division
  - VfB Stuttgart, 4th place in the Bezirksliga-runners-up round southwest division
  - Stuttgarter Kickers, 5th place
  - Karlsruher FV, 4th place
- 1929:
  - Freiburger FC, 8th place in the Bezirksliga-runners-up round southwest division
  - Phönix Karlsruhe, 6th place in the Bezirksliga-runners-up round southwest division
  - VfB Stuttgart, 5th place in the Bezirksliga-runners-up round southwest division
  - Stuttgarter Kickers, 4th place in the Bezirksliga-runners-up round southwest division
  - Germania Brötzingen, 6th place
  - Karlsruher FV, 5th place
- 1930:
  - Union Böckingen, 8th place in the Bezirksliga-runners-up round southwest division
  - Phönix Karlsruhe, 7th place in the Bezirksliga-runners-up round southwest division
  - Karlsruher FV, 4th place in the Bezirksliga-runners-up round southwest division
  - VfR Heilbronn, 3rd place in the Bezirksliga-runners-up round southwest division
  - Freiburger FC, 8th place
  - VfB Stuttgart, 5th place
- 1931:
  - Phönix Karlsruhe, 8th place in the Bezirksliga-runners-up round southwest division
  - FV Rastatt, 7th place in the Bezirksliga-runners-up round southwest division
  - Stuttgarter Kickers, 5th place in the Bezirksliga-runners-up round southwest division
  - 1. FC Pforzheim, 4th place in the Bezirksliga-runners-up round southwest division
  - Union Böckingen, 8th place
  - Karlsruher FV, 5th place
- 1932:
  - VfB Stuttgart, 8th place southwest division
  - FV Rastatt, 7th place southwest division
  - 1. FC Pforzheim, 4th place southwest division
  - Karlsruher FV, 3rd place southwest division
- 1933:
  - Union Böckingen, 8th place northsouth division
  - Phönix Karlsruhe, 6th place northsouth division
  - Karlsruher FV, 5th place northsouth division
  - Stuttgarter Kickers, 4th place northsouth division

=== German championship ===
No team from the region qualified for the German championship finals in this era.

== Founding members of the league ==
- Stuttgarter Kickers
- Freiburger FC
- 1. FC Pforzheim
- Stuttgarter SC
- VfR Heilbronn
- FC Mühlburg
- SV Feuerbach
- Phönix Karlsruhe

== Winners and runners-up of the Bezirksliga Württemberg-Baden ==
Season	Winner	Runner-Up
1923–24	Stuttgarter Kickers	Freiburger FC
1924–25	Stuttgarter Kickers	Freiburger FC
1925–26	Karlsruher FV	VfB Stuttgart
1926–27	VfB Stuttgart	Karlsruher FV

Season	Württemberg	Baden
1927–28	Stuttgarter Kickers	Karlruher FV
1928–29	Germania Brötzingen	Karlruher FV
1929–30	VfB Stuttgart	Freiburger FC
1930–31	Union Böckingen	Karlruher FV
1931–32	1. FC Pforzheim	Karlruher FV
1932–33	Stuttgarter Kickers	Phönix Karlsruhe

== Placings in the Bezirksliga Württemberg-Baden 1923-33 ==
=== Clubs from Baden-division ===
Club	1924	1925	1926	1927	1928	1929	1930	1931	1932	1933
Freiburger FC	2	2	3	8	5	2	1	8	3	4
FC Mühlburg	6	8							7	5
Phönix Karlsruhe	8			6	2	3	3	2	6	1
SC Freiburg		7		5	3	4	7	7	4	6
Karlsruher FV			1	2	1	1	2	1	1	2
Offenburger FV					4	8				10
SpVgg Freiburg					6	7	8			
FC 08 Villingen					7	5	4	5	9	
VfB Karlsruhe					8			6	8	3
FV Rastatt						6	6	3	2	9
SpVgg Schramberg							5	4	5	8
FC Rheinfelden									10	
Frankonia Karlsruhe										7

Source:"Bezirksliga Württemberg-Baden". Das deutsche Fussball-Archiv.

=== Clubs from the Württemberg-division ===
Club	1924	1925	1926	1927	1928	1929	1930	1931	1932	1933
Stuttgarter Kickers	1	1	4	3	1	2	6	3	7	1
1. FC Pforzheim	3	3	7				5	2	1	4
Stuttgarter SC	4	6	6	4	4	8				7
VfR Heilbronn	5	4	5	7	6	5	3	8	10	
SV Feuerbach	7								4	5
VfB Stuttgart		5	2	1	3	3	1	4	2	3
FC Birkenfeld			8		7	7	7	6	8	8
Union Böckingen				9	2	4	2	1	6	2
Sportfreunde Stuttgart				10	5	6	8			
FV Zuffenhausen					8			7	9	
Pfeil Gaisburg					9					
Germania Brötzingen						1	4	5	5	6
Sportfreunde Eßlingen									3	9
Normannia Gmünd										10

Source:"Bezirksliga Württemberg-Baden". Das deutsche Fussball-Archiv.
