= Kreisliga Hessen =

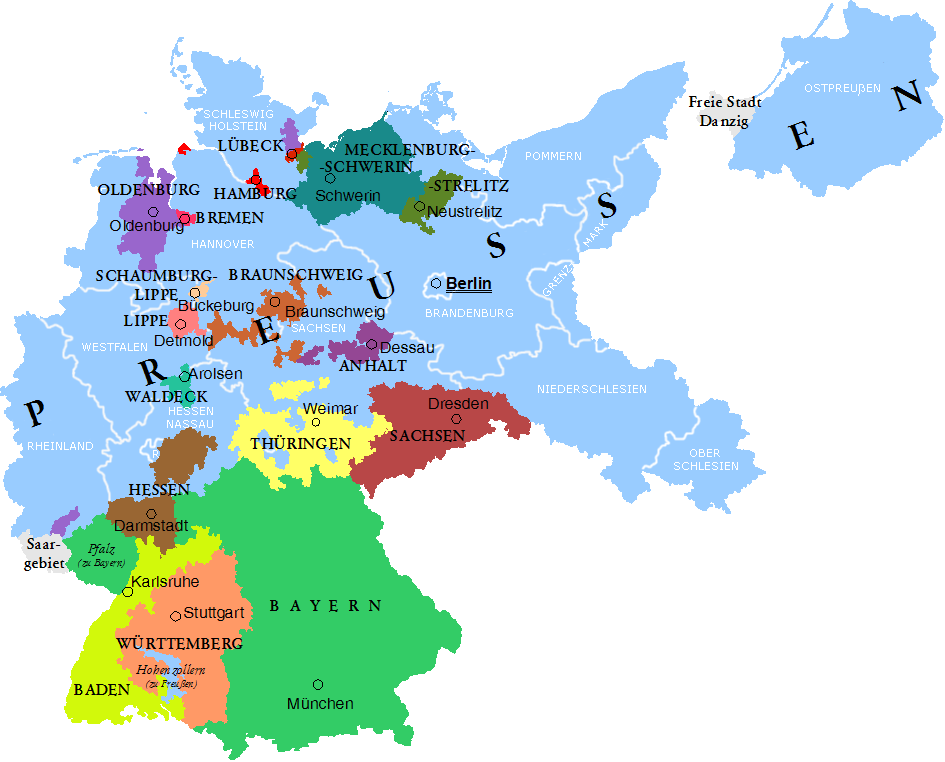
- Founded: 1919
- Folded: 1923
- Replaced by: Bezirksliga Rheinhessen-Saar
- Country: Germany
- State: People's State of Hesse; Hesse-Nassau; Palatinate
- Level on pyramid: Level 1
- Last champions: SV Wiesbaden (1922–23)

The Kreisliga Hessen (English: District league Hesse) was the highest association football league in parts of the German state of Hesse (Rheinhessen) and parts of the Bavarian region of Palatinate as well as the Prussian province of Hesse-Nassau from 1919 to 1923. The league was disbanded with the introduction of the Bezirksliga Rheinhessen-Saar in 1923.

While the league carries the name Kreisliga Hessen it did not cover anywhere near the whole area of what is now the federal state of Hesse. Its main body lay in what is now Rhineland-Palatinate, together with the Wiesbaden area of the state of Hesse.

== Overview ==
=== Predecessor ===
From 1907, four regional leagues were formed within the structure of the Southern German football championship, in a move to improve the organisation of football in Southern Germany, these being:

- Ostkreis-Liga, covering Bavaria
- Nordkreis-Liga, covering Hesse
- Südkreis-Liga, covering Württemberg, Baden and Alsace
- Westkreis-Liga, covering the Palatinate, Lorraine and the southern Rhine Province

In 1908, a first Nordkreis-Liga (English: Northern District League) and Westkreis-Liga (English: Western District League) were established. With the outbreak of the First World War, league football came to a halt and, during the war, games were only played on a limited level.

=== Post-First World War ===
With the collapse of the German Empire in 1918, no Nord- or Westkreis championship was played in 1918-19 but football returned to a more organised system in 1919.

Southern Germany, now without the Alsace and Lorraine regions, which had to be returned to France, was sub-divided into ten Kreisligas, these being:

- Kreisliga Hessen
- Kreisliga Nordbayern
- Kreisliga Nordmain
- Kreisliga Odenwald
- Kreisliga Pfalz
- Kreisliga Saar
- Kreisliga Südbayern
- Kreisliga Südmain
- Kreisliga Südwest
- Kreisliga Württemberg

The new Kreisliga Hessen was made up from ten clubs from both the Nordkreis and Westkreis leagues. The league winners of the Kreisligas advanced to the Southern championship. This system applied for the 1919-20 and 1920-21 season.

In 1921-22, the Kreisliga Hessen was split into two groups of eight, increasing the number of tier-one clubs in the region to 16. The two league winners then played a final to determine the Hessen champion, which in turn advanced to a Rheinhessen-Saar championship final against the Saar champion. This "watering down" of football in the region lasted for only one season, in 1922-23, the number of top clubs was reduced to eight clubs in a single division, with a Rheinhessen-Saar final against the Saar champion once more.

In 1923, a league reform which was decided upon in Darmstadt, Hesse, established the Southern German Bezirksligas which were to replace the Kreisligas. The best four teams each from the Kreisliga Hessen and Saar were admitted to the new Bezirksliga Rheinhessen-Saar. The four clubs from Hessen were:

- SV Wiesbaden
- TG Höchst
- Alemannia Worms
- FV 02 Bieberich

== National success ==
The clubs from the Kreisliga Hessen were not particularly successful in this era and none managed to qualify for the German championship.

=== Rheinhessen-Saar championship ===
Played in 1922 and 1923, these were the finals:

- 1922:
  - Hessen final: SV Wiesbaden - Alemannia Worms 2-0 / 1-4 / 2-1
  - Rheinhessen-Saar final: Borussia Neunkirchen - SV Wiesbaden 3-1 / 3-0
- 1923:
  - Rheinhessen-Saar final: Borussia Neunkirchen - SV Wiesbaden 0-0 / 2-2 / 3-0

=== Southern German championship ===
Qualified teams and their success:

- 1920:
  - Germania Wiesbaden, Group stage
- 1921:
  - FSV Mainz 05, Group stage
- 1922:
  - SV Wiesbaden, not qualified
- 1923:
  - SV Wiesbaden, not qualified

== Winners and runners-up of the Kreisliga Hessen ==
Season	Champions	Runner-Up
1919–20	Germania Wiesbaden	SV Wiesbaden
1920–21	FSV Mainz 05	Alemannia Worms
1921–22	SV Wiesbaden	Alemannia Worms
1922–23	SV Wiesbaden	TG Höchst

== Placings in the Kreisliga Hessen 1919-23 ==
Club	1920	1921	1922	1923
Germania Wiesbaden	1	5	4	7
SV Wiesbaden	2	6	1	1
Alemannia Griesheim	3	4	5	
Höchst 01	4			
Fvgg Kastel	5	10	2	5
Höchst 08	6			
FC Kreuznach 02	7		7	
FV 02 Biebrich	8	8	3	4
FSV Mainz 05	9	1	3	6
SG Egelsbach	10			
Alemannia Worms		2	1	3
TG Höchst		3	2	2
Wormatia Worms		7	6	
Union Wixhausen		9		
FC Unterliederbach			6	
FV Geisenheim			7	
SpVgg Griesheim			8	
FV Kreuznach 07			4	8
Fvgg Mombach			5	
VfR Worms ^{1}			8	

- ^{1} VfR Worms joined Wormatia Worms in 1922.
