= VfL Neckarau =

German football club

- Full name: Verein für Leibesübungen 1884 e.V. Mannheim-Neckarau
- Founded: 1921
- Ground: Waldweg-Stadion
- Capacity: 6,000
- Chairman: Wolfgang Beha
- Manager: Richard Weber
- League: Landesliga Rhein-Neckar (VII)
- 2015–16: 9th
Home colours	Away colours

VfL Neckarau is a German association football club from the district of Neckarau in the city of Mannheim, Baden-Württemberg.

== History ==
=== Foundation and early years ===
The current day club came out of a long string of mergers of predecessor sides. On 9 September 1907, Fuβball-Club Germania 1904 and Fuβball-Club Allemannia 1905 united to form Fuβball-Vereinigung 1907 Neckarau. In 1921, FV in turn merged with the gymnastics clubs Turnverein 1884 Neckarau and Turnerbund Jahn Neckarau (which had formed its own football department in 1914), while playing in the Kreisliga Odenwald. The newly formed association was known as Verein für Leibesübungen 1884 Neckarau. The following year Athletik-Sportverein Neckarau became part of the club, while earlier partner TV Jahn Neckarau became an independent club again in 1924.

=== Into the top flight ===
The first appearance by VfL on the national stage came with their participation in the regional Süddeutschland qualifying round for the German championship in 1927. They again took part in qualification play in 1929 and 1932, but came away unsuccessful each time. Following the reorganization of German football into 16 top-flight divisions under the Third Reich in 1933, Neckarau became part of the Gauliga Baden (I).

They remained in first-division play until the end of World War II in 1945. In 1939, the team narrowly missed demotion. Despite being beaten 2:0 by SpVgg Sandhofen in relegation play, they avoided being sent down when league reorganization expanded their division allowing VfL to stay up in the Gauliga Baden-Staffel Nord. They rebounded and took the division title in 1941, but were quickly eliminated from the national playoffs after a poor showing in their qualification group. They also made their only appearance in national cup play that year when they took part in the opening round of the Tschammerpokal, predecessor to today's German Cup (DFB-Pokal), where they were eliminated 0:4 by FV Metz. From 1943 to 1945, VfL played as part of the combined wartime side Kriegspielgemeinschaft Neckarau alongside SpVgg Mannheim.

=== Post war ===
Following the conflict, the club was re-established as VfL 1884 Mannheim-Neckarau. The renewed association included the memberships of TV Jahn Neckarau and Arbeiter Turn- Sportverein Neckarau, a worker's club which had been disbanded in 1933 as politically undesirable under the Nazi regime. The footballers captured the title in the Landesliga Nordbaden (II) in 1946 and advanced to first-division play in the Oberliga Süd. They fared poorly in their next two campaigns and were sent down in 1948. The following season, a vice-championship in the Landesliga was followed by a failed promotion attempt. VfL captured the division in 1950 and then beat TSG Ulm 3:0 to return to the Oberliga Süd (I). They struggled through the 50s, lasting only two seasons in the Oberliga before slipping through the Landesliga and into lower level play. Fritz Balogh appeared for the national side in 1950 in their first international after World War II.

The team resurfaced in the Amateurliga Nordbaden (III) in 1957–58, capturing a title there, but failing in their bid to win promotion to second-tier competition. They remained in the Amateurliga until 1964, capturing the title there again in 1962, before crashing to a 15th-place finish and falling to the Landesliga Rhein-Nord (IV). Neckarau again rebounded and advanced to the Regionalliga Süd (II) to play a single season in 1968–69. After a second-place finish in the Amateurliga Nordbaden the next year, the club took part in the national amateur championship and advanced as far as the semifinals where they were put out by SC Jülich (1:0, 1:3).

The club played in the Amateurliga Nordbaden (III) through the 70s and 80s, becoming a fourth-division side after league restructuring in 1978. VfL slipped to lower-tier play in 1990 and is currently part of the Landesliga Rhein-Neckar (VII) after spending some time in the Kreisliga Mannheim (VIII), now under the name of VfL Kurpfalz Mannheim-Neckarau.

== Honours ==
The club's honours:

=== League ===
- Gauliga Baden (I)
  - Champions: 1941
- Bezirksliga Rhein-Saar (I)
  - Champions: 1929
- Bezirksliga Rhein (I)
  - Champions: 1927
- Landesliga Nordbaden (II)
  - Champions: 1946, 1950
- Landesliga Rhein-Nord (IV)
  - Champions: 1965
- Amateurliga Nordbaden (III)
  - Champions: 1958, 1968
- Verbandsliga Nordbaden (V)
  - Champions: 1988
- Kreisliga Mannheim (VIII)
  - Champions: 2011

=== Cup ===
- North Baden Cup
  - Winners: 1957, 1967

== Recent seasons ==
The recent season-by-season performance of the club:

Season	Division	Tier	Position
2005–06	Kreisliga Mannheim A1	VII	1st
2005–06	Kreisliga Mannheim	VII	4th
2006–07	Kreisliga Mannheim	VII	7th
2007–08	Kreisliga Mannheim	VII	2nd ↑
2008–09	Landesliga Rhein-Neckar	VII	15th ↓
2009–10	Kreisliga Mannheim	VIII	8th
2010–11	Kreisliga Mannheim	VIII	1st ↑
2011–12	Landesliga Rhein-Neckar	VII	6th
2012–13	Landesliga Rhein-Neckar	VII	8th
2013–14	Landesliga Rhein-Neckar	VII	10th
2014–15	Landesliga Rhein-Neckar	VII	7th
2015–16	Landesliga Rhein-Neckar	VII	9th
2016–17	Landesliga Rhein-Neckar	VII	

- With the introduction of the Regionalligas in 1994 and the 3. Liga in 2008 as the new third tier, below the 2. Bundesliga, all leagues below dropped one tier.

↑ Promoted	↓ Relegated
