= Kreisliga Bayern =

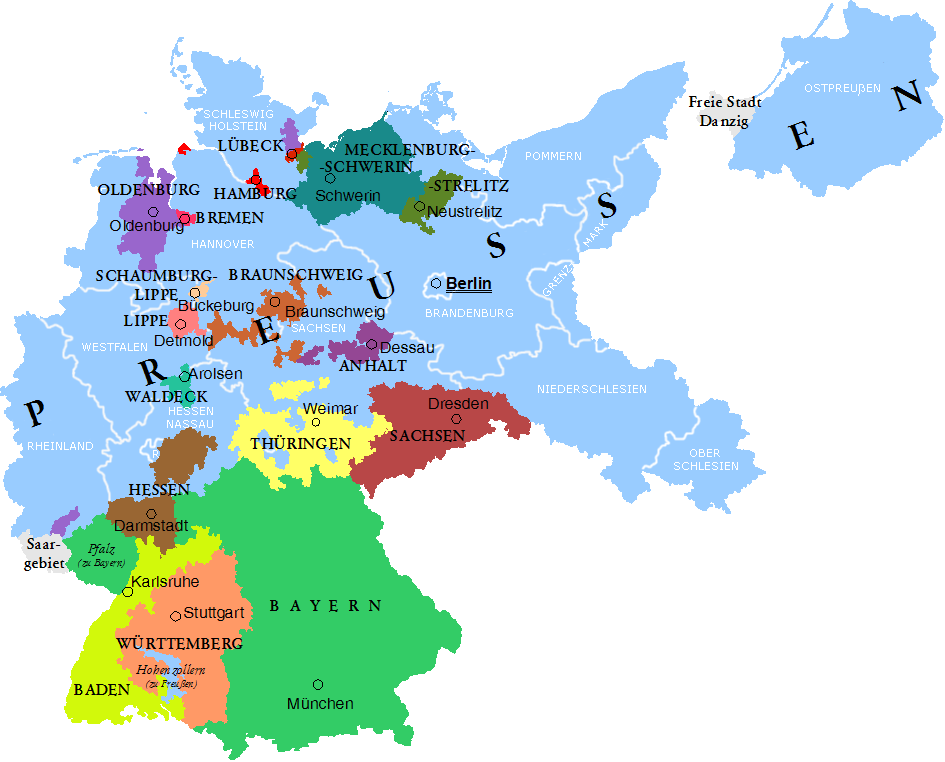
- Founded: 1909
- Folded: 1923
- Replaced by: Gauliga Bayern
- Country: German Empire Germany
- State: Kingdom of Bavaria Bavaria
- Level on pyramid: Level 1
- Last champions: SpVgg Fürth (1922–23)

The Kreisliga Bayern (English: District league Bavaria) was the highest association football league in the German Kingdom of Bavaria and, later, the state of Bavaria from 1909 to 1923. The league was disbanded with the introduction of the Bezirksliga Bayern in 1923.

== Overview ==
=== 1907 to 1914 ===
The league was formed in a move to improve the organisation of football in Southern Germany in the early 1900s. Within the structure of the Southern German football championship, four regional leagues were gradually established from 1907, these being:

- Ostkreis-Liga, covering Bavaria
- Nordkreis-Liga, covering Hesse
- Südkreis-Liga, covering Württemberg, Baden and Alsace
- Westkreis-Liga, covering the Palatinate, Lorraine and the southern Rhine Province

In 1909, a first Ostkreis-Liga (English: Eastern District League) was established, consisting of only four clubs and playing a home-and-away season, these clubs being:

- Bayern Munich
- 1. FC Nürnberg
- MTV 1879 München
- SpVgg Fürth

The winner of this competition, Bayern Munich, advanced to the Southern German championship, which in turn was a qualifying competition for the German championship. The Bavarian clubs from the Palatinate never played in the same league as the clubs from the "mainland", instead, they were part of the Westkreis-Liga. Previous to the new Ostkreis-Liga, regional competitions with a finals round were played but this was not truly an all-Bavarian competition as only clubs from the major cities took part.

The following season, 1910–11, a proper league with ten clubs was established, the teams again playing a home-and-away season. Parallel, the other three Southern Kreisligas were organised in a similar fashion with the four regional winners playing for the southern title. In the following season, the league was expanded to eleven teams but the modus remained the same.

For the 1912-13 season, the league was reduced to eight teams. It remained unchanged for its last pre-First World War season in 1913-14.

=== 1914 to 1919 ===
The outbreak of war in August 1914 lead to a suspension of all football competitions. Initially it was thought that the war would not last long but when it became evident that this was not so, competitions were restarted with players too young or too old to be drafted to the military. In any case, a 1914-15 championship was not held. A 1915-16 championship was held on regional level with a Bavarian final rather than a league, a system in place for 1916-17 and 1917-18 as well.

=== 1919 to 1923 ===
With the collapse of the German Empire in 1918, no Bavarian championship was played in 1918-19 but football returned to a more organised system in 1919, similar to the one used before the war.

Southern Germany, now without the Alsace region, which had to be returned to France, was sub-divided into ten Kreisligas, these being:

- Kreisliga Hessen
- Kreisliga Nordbayern
- Kreisliga Nordmain
- Kreisliga Odenwald
- Kreisliga Pfalz
- Kreisliga Saar
- Kreisliga Südbayern
- Kreisliga Südmain
- Kreisliga Südwest
- Kreisliga Württemberg

Bavaria was sub-divided into two Kreisligas, north and south, with ten clubs each. Both league winners advanced to the Southern championship. This system applied for the 1919-20 and 1920-21 season.

In 1921-22, the two regional divisions were in turn split into two groups of eight, increasing the number of tier-one clubs in Bavaria to 32. The four league winners then played a semi-final and final to determine the Bavarian champion. This "watering down" of Bavarian football lasted for only one season, in 1922-23, the number of top clubs was halved and the league returned to a northern and southern division, now with eight clubs each. The two league winners played a Bavarian final once more.

In 1923, a league reform which was decided upon in Darmstadt, Hesse, established the Southern German Bezirksligas which were to replace the Kreisligas. The best four teams each from the north and south of Bavaria were admitted to the new Bezirksliga Bayern.

== National success ==
=== Southern German championship ===
Qualified teams and their success:

- 1910:
  - Bayern Munich, Runners-up
- 1911:
  - Bayern Munich, Runners-up
- 1912:
  - SpVgg Fürth, 3rd place
- 1913:
  - SpVgg Fürth, 4th place
- 1914:
  - SpVgg Fürth, Southern German champions
- 1916:
  - 1. FC Nürnberg, Southern German champions
- 1917:
  - SpVgg Fürth, Runners-up
- 1918:
  - 1. FC Nürnberg, Southern German champions
- 1920:
  - 1. FC Nürnberg, Southern German champions
- 1921:
  - 1. FC Nürnberg, Southern German champions
- 1922:
  - Wacker München, Southern German champions
- 1923:
  - SpVgg Fürth, Southern German champions

=== German championship ===
- 1914:
  - SpVgg Fürth, German champions
- 1920:
  - 1. FC Nürnberg, German champions
- 1921:
  - 1. FC Nürnberg, German champions
- 1922:
  - Wacker München, Semi-finals
  - 1. FC Nürnberg, Runners-up
- 1923:
  - SpVgg Fürth, Semi-finals

== Winners and runners-up of the Kreisliga Bayern ==
**Season**	**Winner**	**Runner-Up**
1909–10	**Bayern Munich**	1. FC Nürnberg
1910–11	**Bayern Munich**	1. FC Nürnberg
1911–12	**SpVgg Fürth**	Bayern Munich
1912–13	**SpVgg Fürth**	Bayern Munich
1913–14	**SpVgg Fürth**	1. FC Nürnberg
1914–15	not held	
1915–16	**1. FC Nürnberg**	TSV 1860 Munich
1916–17	**SpVgg Fürth**	Bayern Munich
1917–18	**1. FC Nürnberg**	Bayern Munich
1918–19	not held	

**Season**	**North**	**South**
1919–20	1. FC Nürnberg	Bayern Munich
1920–21	1. FC Nürnberg	Wacker München
1921–22	SpVgg Fürth	**Wacker München**
1922–23	**SpVgg Fürth**	Bayern Munich

- **Bold** denotes Bavarian champion (when determined).

== Placings in the Kreisliga Bayern 1909-23 ==
=== Ostkreis-Liga 1909-14 ===
Club	1910	1911	1912	1913	1914
SpVgg Fürth	4	3	**1**	**1**	**1**
1. FC Nürnberg	2	2	3	3	2
Pfeil Nürnberg		6	5	5	3
Bayern Munich	**1**	**1**	2	2	4
MTV 1879 München	3	4	7	4	5
VfB Noris Nürnberg		10	8		6
Kickers Würzburg				6	7
Wacker München		5	4	7	8
TSV 1860 Munich		7	6	8	
1. FC Bamberg		9	9		
Concordia Nürnberg			10		
MTV Augsburg		8	11		

=== Kreisliga Nordbayern 1919-1923 ===
Club	1920	1921	1922	1923
SpVgg Fürth	2	2	**1**	**1**
1. FC Nürnberg	**1**	**1**	**1**	2
FV Nürnberg	4	3	2	3
1. FC Bamberg	8	9	4	4
MTV Fürth	6	7	3	5
Kickers Würzburg	7	8	2	6
TV 46 Nürnberg	5	4	4	7
TV 1860 Fürth		6	3	8
TV Weiden			5	
FV Würzburg 04			5	
Pfeil Nürnberg	3	5	6	
TV Schweinau			6	
SpVgg Hof			7	
SpVgg Erlangen			7	
Franken Fürth			8	
Bayern Kitzingen		10	8	
BSC Nürnberg	9			
1. FC Schweinfurt 05	10			

=== Kreisliga Südbayern 1919-1923 ===
Club	1920	1921	1922	1923
Bayern Munich	**1**	3	2	**1**
TSV 1860 Munich	2	2	**1**	2
Wacker München	3	**1**	**1**	3
Schwaben Augsburg	4	4	2	4
Jahn Regensburg			3	5
MTV Ingolstadt	6	7	4	6
MTV 1879 München	5	5	3	7
SpVgg München	7	6	4	8
Teutonia München	8	8	5	
Viktoria Augsburg			5	
TV Neuhausen			6	
SpVgg Landshut			6	
BC Augsburg		9	7	
Armin München		10	7	
TV Memmingen			8	
TV Dachau			8	
TV 1880 München	9			
FC Augsburg	10			
