= FC Alemannia 1897 Karlsruhe =

German football club

Alemannia Karlsruhe
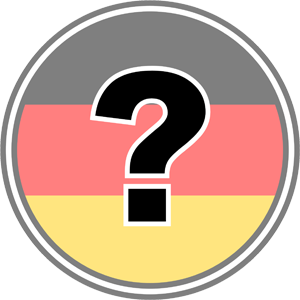
- Full name: Fußball-Club Alemannia 1897 Karlsruhe
- Founded: 1897
- Dissolved: 1912

Alemannia Karlsruhe was a German association football club from the city of Karlsruhe, Baden-Württemberg. The club was formed as Karlsruher Fußball-Club Alemannia 1897 Karlsruhe in 1897 and played four seasons in the regional top-flight Südkreisliga as a lower table side from 1908 to 1912.

In July 1912 Alemannia merged with Phönix Karlsruhe to form Karlsruher Phönix-Alemannia. During World War II the club played as part of the combined wartime side Kriegspielgemeinschaft Phönix/Germania Karlsruhe alongside Germania Durlach in 1943–45.

Following the war these clubs went their separate ways with Alemannia going on to merge with VfB Mühlburg on 16 October 1952 to create Karlsruher Sport-Club.
