= MFC 08 Lindenhof =

German football club

- Full name: Mannheimer Fußball-Club 1908 Lindenhof e.V.
- Nickname(s): 08er
- Founded: 1908
- Ground: Schäferwiese Waldpark
- League: Kreisliga Mannheim A1 (VIII)
- 2015–16: 9th
Home colours	Away colours

MFC 08 Lindenhof is a German association football club from the district of Lindenhof in the city of Mannheim, Baden-Württemberg.

== History ==
The club was established 21 March 1908 as Mannheimer Fußball-Club Lindenhof and was joined in 1915 by Sportverein Lindenhof and Spielvereinigung Lindenhof. The club is notable for its single season turn in the Gauliga Baden, one of the country's 15 regional top-flight divisions established in the re-organization of German football in 1933. After capturing the title in the Bezirksklasse Unterbaden-West in 1934, MFC beat FV Weinheim (3:1, 0:1) in a qualification playoff and then went on to a second-place finish in the Gauliga promotion round in order to advance. Their Gauliga campaign ended in a 10th-place finish and relegation.

MFC was part of the 2. Amateurliga following World War II with their highest rise coming in 1999 when they won their way into the Landesliga Rhein-Neckar (VI) where they played until 2002. The club is still active today and with nearly 600 members is Lindenhof's largest sports club with departments for football and tennis. The footballers are currently part of the Kreisliga Mannheim (VIII).
