= FV Speyer =

German football club

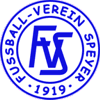
- Full name: Fußballverein Speyer 1919 e.V.
- Founded: 15 May 1919; 107 years ago
- Dissolved: 30 June 2009; 17 years ago
- Ground: Stadion am Roßsprung
- Capacity: 14,000
- League: defunct
Home colours	Away colours

FV Speyer was a German association football club from the town of Speyer, Rhineland-Palatinate. The club's greatest success has been promotion to the tier one Oberliga Südwest in 1952 and 1956, spending seven seasons at this level. In the Bundesliga era FV played in the tier two Regionalliga Südwest for six seasons from 1968 to 1974, when the league was disbanded.

In 2009 FV Speyer merged with local rival VfR Speyer to form FC Speyer 09.

== History ==
FV Speyer was formed in 1919, originally as the football department of local gymnastics club Turnverein Speyer, but soon became an independent entity.

FV Speyer became part of the tier one Kreisliga Pfalz in 1920 and played there for two seasons before being relegated again. It returned to top-level football for a season in 1926–27 in the Bezirksliga Rhein and continued on in the following season in the new Bezirksliga Rhein-Saar in what was then very regionalised German first tier football in the Mannheim/Ludwigshafen area. After the rise of the Nazis to power and the establishment of the Gauligas in 1933 Speyer did not make an appearance in top-tier football again until 1943 when it joined the Gauliga Westmark, temporarily playing as KSG Speyer.

In 1951 Speyer became a founding member of the tier two 2. Oberliga Südwest in which it finished runners-up and earned promotion in its inaugural season. FV played the next three seasons from 1952 to 1955 in the Oberliga Südwest, with a tenth place in 1952–53 as its best-ever result. After relegation the club finished runners-up once more in the 2. Oberliga and was promoted straight back to the Oberliga. A second stint in the Oberliga Südwest followed from 1956 to 1960 in which the best result was a twelfth place in 1958–59, followed by relegation the season after.

The club came third in the 2. Oberliga in 1961 and fourth the season after but, in the final season of the league in 1962–63, it finished last and failed to qualify for the new Regionalliga Südwest which would replace the 2. Oberliga in the region. Instead Speyer had to enter the tier three Amateurliga Südwest. The club played at this level for the next five season until finishing runners-up behind 1. FC Kaiserslautern Amateure, the reserve team of 1. FC Kaiserslautern. As the former was ineligible for promotion Speyer went up instead.

From 1968 to 1974 the club played in the second division Regionalliga Südwest and, apart from a fifth place in 1970, always finished in the bottom half of the league. A fifteenth place in 1974 was not enough to qualify the club for the new 2. Bundesliga and, like 1963, the club once more had to drop back to the Amateurliga.

From 1974 on wards the club experienced a decline, culminating in a disastrous 1976–77 Amateurliga season where Speyer earned just one point out of 36 games and conceded 183 goals. Consequently, the club was relegated and unable to compete for qualification to the new tier three Oberliga Südwest in 1978. Speyer rose as far as the tier four Verbandsliga Südwest again in 1983, where it played until 1991 and, again, from 1995 to 2004, and came close to Oberliga promotion in 2000 when it finished runners-up.

After relegation from the Verbandsliga in 2003–04 Speyer experienced a number of difficult seasons, winning just eight games out of 118 and conceding 592 goals in four seasons but being spared relegation from the Landesliga twice because other clubs withdrew. The club played its last season in the Bezirksliga in 2007–08, having stabilised its fall with a sixth place. During the 2008–09 season FV Speyer merged with local rival VfR Speyer to form FC Speyer 09.

== Honours ==
The club's honours:

- 2. Oberliga Südwest
  - Runners-up: 1951–52, 1955–56
- Landesliga Südwest-Ost
  - Champions: 1994–95

== Final seasons ==
The final season-by-season performance of the club:

Season	Division	Tier	Position	Pld	W	D	L	GF	GA	Pts
2003–04	Verbandsliga Südwest	V	16th ↓	30	1	2	27	12	136	5
2004–05	Landesliga Südwest-Ost	VI	15th	28	1	3	24	26	129	6
2005–06	Landesliga Südwest-Ost	VI	16th	30	1	3	26	27	152	6
2006–07	Landesliga Südwest-Ost	VI	16th ↓	30	5	3	22	36	175	18
2007–08	Bezirksliga Vorderpfalz	VII	6th	32	16	5	11	78	51	53
2008–09	Bezirksliga Vorderpfalz	VIII	3rd	30	20	6	4	78	35	66

↑ Promoted	↓ Relegated

== Stadium ==
From 1926 to 2001 FV Speyer played in the Stadion am Roßsprung which held 14,000 spectators. In 2001 the stadium was demolished and replaced by a housing estate. FV moved to the Sportpark Speyer from 2001 on wards which became the home ground of the new club FC Speyer.
