= Bezirksliga Rhein-Saar =

Bezirksliga Rhein
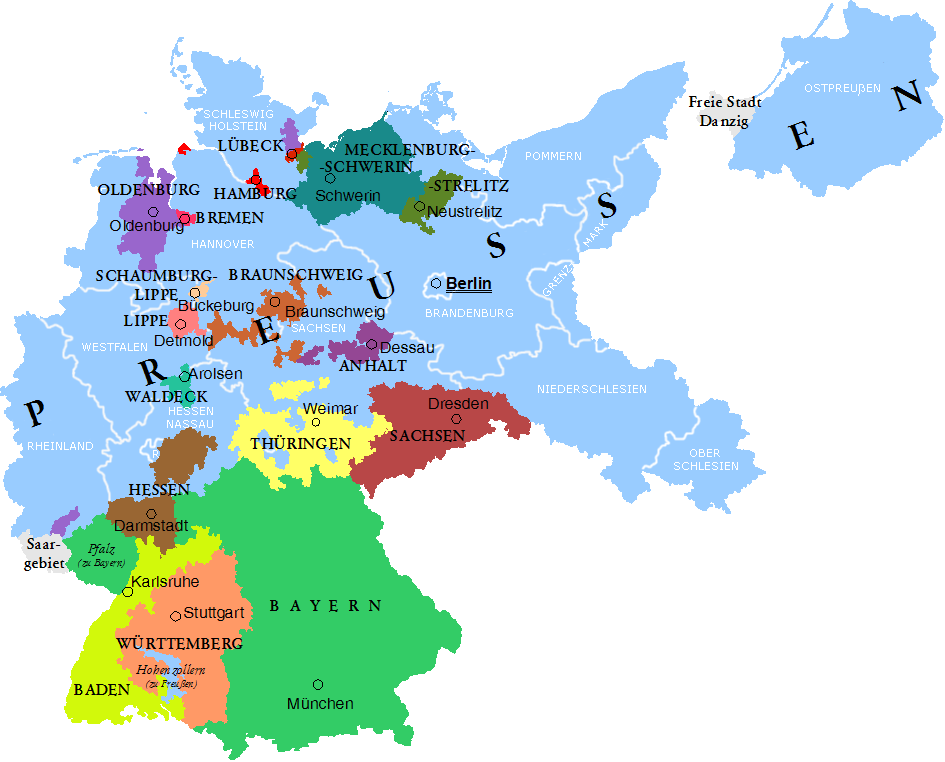
- Founded: 1927
- Folded: 1933
- Replaced by: Gauliga Südwest/Mainhessen Gauliga Baden
- Country: Germany
- State: Baden; Palatinate; Saarland
- Level on pyramid: Level 1
- Last champions: Rhein: Waldhof Mannheim Saar: FK Pirmasens (1932–33)

The Bezirksliga Rhein-Saar was the highest association football league in the German state of Saarland, the Bavarian region of Palatinate and the northernmost part of Baden from 1927 to 1933. The league was disbanded with the rise of the Nazis to power in 1933.

== Overview ==
The league was formed in 1927, from the clubs of the Bezirksliga Rhein and the southern half of the Bezirksliga Rheinhessen-Saar. The clubs from the Bezirksliga Rheinhessen-Saar which did not become part of the new league were added to the new Bezirksliga Main-Hessen instead. While the majority of clubs originated from the Palatinate and the Saarland it also incooperated some clubs from the state of Baden, from the Mannheim area and from the Prussian Rhine Province, from Trier.

The league operated from the start in two regional divisions, the Rhein-division, named after the river Rhein and the Saar-division, named after the river of Saar. The first played with eleven, the second with ten clubs in its first season 1927-28. The clubs in each division played each other in a home-and-away round with the division winners advancing to the Southern German championship, which in turn was a qualification tournament for the German championship. A Bezirksliga final was not played.

The second and third placed team in each division qualified for another round, the Bezirksliga runners-up round, to determine one more team which would gain entry to the German finals.

The leagues were reduced to nine teams each in the following season but remained unchanged in modus otherwise. For the 1929-30 season, both divisions then operated on a strength of eight teams, a system that also applied in the following season.

In the 1931-32 season, both divisions expanded in strength to ten teams. The Southern German finals were also reorganised with the top two teams from each division advancing to the Northwest finals group.

In its last season, 1932–33, both divisions operated on a strength of ten clubs.

With the rise of the Nazis to power, the Gauligas were introduced as the highest football leagues in Germany. In the region, the Gauliga Südwest/Mainhessen replaced the Bezirksliga Rhein-Saar as the highest level of play. The clubs from Mannheim however entered the new Gauliga Baden while the teams from Trier went to the Gauliga Mittelrhein.

== National success ==
=== Southern German championship ===
Qualified teams and their success:

- 1928:
  - Borussia Neunkirchen, 8th place in the Bezirksliga-runners-up round
  - Saar 05 Saarbrücken, 7th place in the Bezirksliga-runners-up round
  - Ludwigshafener FG, 4th place in the Bezirksliga-runners-up round
  - VfL Neckarau, 3rd place in theBezirksliga-runners-up round
  - FV Saarbrücken, 8th place
  - Waldhof Mannheim, 7th place
- 1929:
  - 1. FC Idar, 7th place in the Bezirksliga-runners-up round
  - Saar 05 Saarbrücken, 6th place in the Bezirksliga-runners-up round
  - VfR Mannheim, 3rd place in the Bezirksliga-runners-up round
  - Waldhof Mannheim, 2nd place in the Bezirksliga-runners-up round
  - Borussia Neunkirchen, 8th place
  - VfL Neckarau, 3rd place
- 1930:
  - FV Saarbrücken, 8th place in the Bezirksliga-runners-up round
  - VfL Neckarau, 7th place in the Bezirksliga-runners-up round
  - Sportfreunde Saarbrücken, 4th place in the Bezirksliga-runners-up round
  - Phönix Ludwigshafen, 2nd place in the Bezirksliga-runners-up round
  - Waldhof Mannheim, 6th place
  - FK Pirmasens, 4th place
- 1931:
  - 1. FC Idar, 7th place in the Bezirksliga-runners-up round
  - VfL Neckarau, 6th place in the Bezirksliga-runners-up round
  - FV Saarbrücken, 4th place in the Bezirksliga-runners-up round
  - Phönix Ludwigshafen, Winner of the Bezirksliga-runners-up round, loser division final
  - FK Pirmasens, 6th place
  - Waldhof Mannheim, 4th place
- 1932:
  - Waldhof Mannheim, 7th place northwest division
  - FK Pirmasens, 6th place northwest division
  - FV Saarbrücken, 5th place northwest division
  - VfL Neckarau, 4th place northwest division
- 1933:
  - 1. FC Kaiserslautern, 8th place eastwest division
  - FK Pirmasens, 7th place eastwest division
  - Phönix Ludwigshafen, 6th place eastwest division
  - Waldhof Mannheim, 5th place eastwest division

=== German championship ===
Qualified teams and their success:

- 1928:
  - none qualified
- 1929:
  - none qualified
- 1930:
  - none qualified
- 1931:
  - none qualified
- 1932:
  - none qualified
- 1933:
  - none qualified

== Founding members of the league ==
The 21 founding members of the league and their positions in the 1926-27 season were:

=== Saar division ===
- FV Saarbrücken, Runners-up Bezirksliga Rheinhessen/Saar
- Borussia Neunkirchen, 7th Bezirksliga Rheinhessen/Saar
- SV Saar 05 Saarbrücken, 9th Bezirksliga Rheinhessen/Saar
- 1. FC Idar, 6th Bezirksliga Rheinhessen/Saar
- FK Pirmasens, 5th Bezirksliga Rhein
- Sportfreunde Saarbrücken
- VfR Pirmasens
- FC Kreuznach
- SV Trier
- Eintracht Trier, 10th Bezirksliga Rheinhessen/Saar

=== Rhein division ===
- Waldhof Mannheim, 4th Bezirksliga Rhein
- VfL Neckarau, Winner Bezirksliga Rhein
- VfR Mannheim, Runners-up Bezirksliga Rhein
- Ludwigshafener FG, 7th Bezirksliga Rhein
- Phönix Ludwigshafen, 3rd Bezirksliga Rhein
- MFC Lindenhof
- SpVgg Sandhofen, 9th Bezirksliga Rhein
- Pfalz Ludwigshafen
- FV Speyer, 8th Bezirksliga Rhein
- Phönix Mannheim, 10th Bezirksliga Rhein
- Germania Friedrichsfeld
- All teams without a 1926-27 placing were promoted from the second tier this season.

== Winners and runners-up of the Bezirksliga Rhein-Saar ==
Season	Rhein	Saar
1927–28	Waldhof Mannheim	FV Saarbrücken
1928–29	VfL Neckarau	Borussia Neunkirchen
1929–30	Waldhof Mannheim	FK Pirmasens
1930–31	Waldhof Mannheim	FK Pirmasens
1931–32	Waldhof Mannheim	FK Pirmasens
1932–33	Waldhof Mannheim	FK Pirmasens

== Placings in the Bezirksliga Rhein-Saar 1927-33 ==
=== Rhein division ===
Club	1928	1929	1930	1931	1932	1933
Waldhof Mannheim	1	2	1	1	1	1
VfL Neckarau	2	1	2	3	2	3
VfR Mannheim	3	3	4	6	4	5
Ludwigshafener FG	4	8				
Phönix Ludwigshafen	5	5	3	2	3	2
MFC Lindenhof	6	7	7	5	8	8
SpVgg Sandhofen	7	4	5	7	6	6
Pfalz Ludwigshafen	8	9				
FV Speyer	9					
Phönix Mannheim	10					
Germania Friedrichsfeld	11					
SpVgg Mundenheim		6	6	4	5	7
FG Rohrbach			8			
SG Kirchheim				8	10	
Amicitia Viernheim					7	4
SV Sandhausen					9	
Germania Friedrichsfeld						9
VfR Kaiserslautern						10

Source:"Bezirksliga Rhein-Saar". Das deutsche Fussball-Archiv.

=== Saar division ===
Club	1928	1929	1930	1931	1932	1933
FV Saarbrücken	1	5	3	2	2	5
Borussia Neunkirchen	2	1	4	4	7	3
Saar 05 Saarbrücken	3	3	6	5	5	8
1. FC Idar	4	2	7	3	6	6
FK Pirmasens	5	4	1	1	1	1
Sportfreunde Saarbrücken	6	7	2	6	3	4
VfR Pirmasens	7	6	5	7	9	
FC Kreuznach	8	9				
SV Trier	9					
Eintracht Trier	10					7
SV Saarbrücken		8			8	10
VfR Kaiserslautern			8			
VfB Dillingen				8		
1. FC Kaiserslautern					4	2
Westmark Trier					10	
SV Völklingen						9

Source:"Bezirksliga Rhein-Saar". Das deutsche Fussball-Archiv.
