= Sportfreunde 05 Saarbrücken =

German football club

- Full name: Sportfreunde 05 Saarbrücken e.V.
- Founded: 1905
- Ground: Saarwiesen-Stadion
- Chairman: Heinz König
- League: Landesliga Saarland-Süd (VIII)
- 2015–16: 4th
Home colours	Away colours

The Sportfreunde 05 Saarbrücken is a German Association football club from the town of Saarbrücken, Saarland.

Historically the club has been a strong side in Saarbrücken, playing at highest level, and even applying for Fußball-Bundesliga membership in 1963. The club also took part in the first round of the 1962–63 DFB-Pokal. Since then however Sportfreunde Saarbrücken has declined to a point where it now plays in the lower amateur leagues, having fallen behind local rivals 1. FC Saarbrücken and Saar 05 Saarbrücken.

== History ==
Formed in January 1905 as the football department of TV 1876 Burbach, the club played in the tier one Kreisliga Saar from 1920 onwards with a second place in 1921–22 as its best result. From 1923 TV played in the new Bezirksliga Rhein-Saar, where it was to remain for the next six seasons, coming second in 1929–30 as its best result. On 1 January 1924 it changed its name to Sportfreunde 05 Saarbrücken, became independent of the mother club TV and, in March 1924 was joined by BC Burbach. In 1933, when the Nazis rose to power, the Bezirksliga was replaced by the Gauliga Südwest/Mainhessen, in which Sportfreunde played for two more seasons before being relegated in 1934–35. It returned for one more season to this league in 1936–37 but otherwise remained at the tier below. In 1938, all of the Burbacher sides were merged to form SG Saarbrücken, which was also referred to as TSG Burbach.

Post-Second World War football saw the club play in the Amateurliga Saarland, then the second tier, initially under the name of TuS Burbach, from 1946 as Sportfreunde Burbach and, from 1950 onwards, as Sportfreunde Saarbrücken again. A league title in 1952 allowed the side promotion to the new second tier in the region, the 2nd Oberliga Südwest.

After a 13th-place finish in its first season in the 2nd Oberliga the club won the league in 1954 and gained entry to the tier one Oberliga Südwest for the following season. Sportfreunde however became a Yo-yo club, winning promotion in 1954, 1956 and 1958 but being relegated in 1955 and 1957. Only from 1958 to 1959 onwards did the club's performances in the Oberliga stabilise with three sixth-place finishes in the next five seasons as its best results.

Sportfreunde Saarbrücken, in 1962–63, also applied for a place in the new Fußball-Bundesliga but was unsuccessful in this with a place eventually going to local rival 1. FC Saarbrücken. The club also took part in the 1962–63 DFB-Pokal where it lost 4–2 in the first round to Borussia Dortmund.

The club now became part of the new tier two Regionalliga Südwest but was only able to stay at this level for two seasons before being relegated in 1964, to drop out permanently of professional football. Back in the Amateurliga Saarland, now a tier three league, the side took two seasons struggling against relegation before it was able to return to better performances, coming second in 1967–68 and 1970–71.

In 1975 Sportfreunde suffered another relegation, now from the Amateurliga, and dropped to the fourth tier. In 1978 the Amateurliga was renamed Verbandsliga Saarland and became the fourth tier after the Oberliga Südwest had been reestablished. Sportfreunde Saarbrücken did not qualify for either, instead playing in the tier five Landesliga Saarland-Südwest, but won promotion to the Verbandsliga in 1987. It lasted for only one season at this level however, finishing second last in 1987–88 and has not, since then, been able to return to the highest football league in the Saarland.

Back in the Landesliga Saarland-Südwest the club returned to its pre-1987 existence as a mid-table side until 1991, when it was relegated even further. It took the team until 1999 to return to Landesliga level where it was able to reestablish itself, even coming close to promotion in 2004 and 2005 when it came second in the league. The club has remained at Landesliga level ever since, with the league being split from two into four divisions in 2012 and Sportfreunde entering the new Landesliga Saarland-Süd for 2012–13.

== Honours ==
The club's honours:

=== League ===
- 2nd Oberliga Südwest
  - Champions: 1954, 1956
  - Runners-up: 1958
- Amateurliga Saarland
  - Champions: 1950, 1952
  - Runners-up: 1948, 1968, 1971
- Landesliga Saarland-Südwest
  - Champions: 1987
  - Runners-up: 2004, 2005
- Bezirksliga Saarland-Süd
  - Champions: 1999

== Recent seasons ==
The recent season-by-season performance of the club:

Season	Division	Tier	Position
1999–2000	Landesliga Saarland-Südwest	VI	11th
2000–01	Landesliga Saarland-Südwest	VI	7th
2001–02	Landesliga Saarland-Südwest	VI	3rd
2002–03	Landesliga Saarland-Südwest	VI	7th
2003–04	Landesliga Saarland-Südwest	VI	2nd
2004–05	Landesliga Saarland-Südwest	VI	2nd
2005–06	Landesliga Saarland-Südwest	VI	6th
2006–07	Landesliga Saarland-Südwest	VI	10th
2007–08	Landesliga Saarland-Südwest	VI	7th
2008–09	Landesliga Saarland-Südwest	VII	12th
2009–10	Landesliga Saarland-Südwest	VIII	3rd
2010–11	Landesliga Saarland-Südwest	VIII	6th
2011–12	Landesliga Saarland-Südwest	VIII	12th
2012–13	Landesliga Saarland-Süd	VIII	5th
2013–14	Landesliga Saarland-Süd	VIII	6th
2014–15	Landesliga Saarland-Süd	VIII	2nd
2015–16	Landesliga Saarland-Süd	VIII	4th
2016–17	Landesliga Saarland-Süd	VIII	

- With the introduction of the Regionalligas in 1994 and the 3. Liga in 2008 as the new third tier, below the 2. Bundesliga, all leagues below dropped one tier. The Saarlandliga was introduced in 2009 and replaced the Verbandsliga Saarland at the sixth tier of football in the Saarland. In 2012 the Oberliga Südwest was renamed Oberliga Rheinland-Pfalz/Saar.

↑ Promoted	↓ Relegated
