= Gauliga Baden =

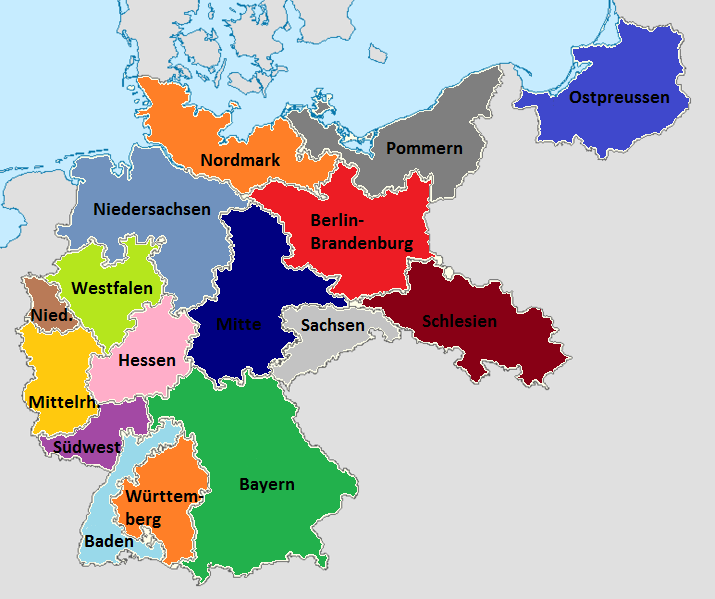
- Founded: 1933
- Folded: 1945
- Replaced by: Oberliga Süd; Oberliga Südwest
- Country: Nazi Germany
- State: Baden
- Gau (from 1934): Gau Baden
- Level on pyramid: Level 1
- Domestic cup: Tschammerpokal
- Last champions: VfR Mannheim (1943–44)

The Gauliga Baden was the highest football league in the German state of Baden from 1933 to 1945. Shortly after the formation of the league, the Nazis reorganised the administrative regions in Germany, and the Gau Baden replaced the state Baden.

== Overview ==
The league was introduced in 1933 by the Nazi Sports Office, after the Nazi take over of power in Germany and Baden. It replaced the Bezirksliga as the highest level of play in German football competitions.

The Gauliga Baden was established with ten clubs, all from the state of Baden.

The Gauliga replaced as such the Bezirksliga Württemberg-Baden and Bezirksliga Rhein-Saar, the highest leagues in the region until then.

In its first season, the league had ten clubs, playing each other once at home and once away. The league winner qualified for the German championship while the bottom two teams were relegated. The league remained unchanged until the outbreak of World War II.

In this era, the only success to come for a club from Baden was, when the SV Waldhof Mannheim reached the German cup final in 1939, losing to the 1. FC Nürnberg.

In 1939–40, the league played in four different groups with a finals round at the end to determine the Baden champion. The year after, it returned to its old system.

For the 1941–42 season, the Gauliga Baden split into a northern and a southern group with six teams each and a four-team finals round. In 1942–43 it returned to a single, ten-team format. Another change of system for the season after meant 19 clubs in three groups with a three team-finals round.

The imminent collapse of Nazi Germany in 1945 gravely affected all Gauligas and football in Baden ceased in January 1945 with none of the groups having absolved their full program.

With the end of the Nazi era, the Gauligas ceased to exist and the state of Baden found itself sub divided between two allied occupation zones, the French zone in the south and the US zone in the north.

The northern half soon saw the formation of the Oberliga Süd as the highest football league for the US occupation zone, while the south became part of the Oberliga Südwest.

== Founding members of the league ==
The ten founding members and their positions in the 1932–33 Bezirksliga Württemberg/Baden and Bezirksliga Rhein/Saar season were:

- SV Waldhof Mannheim, winner Rhein division
- VfR Mannheim, 5th Rhein division
- Freiburger FC, 4th Baden division
- Phönix Karlsruhe, winner Baden division
- 1. FC Pforzheim, 4th Württemberg division
- Karlsruher FV, 2nd Baden division
- VfL Neckarau, 3rd Rhein division
- VfB Mühlburg, merger club of VfB Karlsruhe (3rd) and FC Mühlburg (5th)
- Germania Brötzingen, 6th Württemberg division
- SC Freiburg, 6th Baden division

== Winners and runners-up of the Gauliga Baden ==
The winners and runners-up of the league:

Season	Winner	Runner-Up
1933–34	SV Waldhof Mannheim	VfR Mannheim
1934–35	VfR Mannheim	Phönix Karlsruhe
1935–36	SV Waldhof Mannheim	1. FC Pforzheim
1936–37	SV Waldhof Mannheim	VfR Mannheim
1937–38	VfR Mannheim	1. FC Pforzheim
1938–39	VfR Mannheim	1. FC Pforzheim
1939–40	SV Waldhof Mannheim	VfB Mühlburg
1940–41	VfL Neckarau	VfB Mühlburg
1941–42	SV Waldhof Mannheim	VfB Mühlburg
1942–43	VfR Mannheim	VfTuR Feudenheim
1943–44	VfR Mannheim	VfB Mühlburg

== Placings in the Gauliga Baden 1933–44 ==
The complete list of all clubs participating in the league:

Club	1934	1935	1936	1937	1938	1939	1940	1941	1942	1943	1944
SV Waldhof Mannheim	1	4	1	1	3	4	1	3	1	3	5
VfR Mannheim	2	1	4	2	1	1	2	4	4	1	1
Freiburger FC	3	6	8	4	5	3	1	5	2	6	1
Phönix Karlsruhe ^{1}	4	2	10		6	7	4	6	5	10	
1. FC Pforzheim	5	7	2	3	2	2	3	8	3	5	3
Karlsruher FV	6	8	3	9		6	5	9			5
VfL Neckarau	7	3	5	6	4	8	4	1	2	8	4
VfB Mühlburg	8	5	6	5	8	5	1	2	1	4	1
Germania Brötzingen	9		6	7	10						
SC Freiburg	10						2		6		6
Germania Karlsdorf		9									
FC Mannheim 08		10									
Amicitia Viernheim			9				5				
SV Sandhofen				8	7	9	3	7	3		
FC Rastatt 04				10			6		4	9	2
Kehler FV					9						
Offenburger FV						10	2				
SGK Heidelberg							6				
FC Birkenfeld							2	10			
VfR Achern							1				
FV Lahr							3				
Jahn Offenburg							4				
FC Gutach							3				
FV Emmendingen							4				4
FC Waldkirch							5				
VfTuR Feudenheim									5	2	3
SG Plankstadt									6		
FV Daxlanden										7	6
SC Käfertal											2
KSG Walldorf											6
VfR Pforzheim											4
KSG Karlsruhe ^{1}											7
Luftwaffen SV Freiburg											2
SpVgg Wiehre											3
Kickers Haslach											5

- ^{1} In 1943, the Phönix Karlsruhe and Germania Durlach formed the KSG Karlsruhe.
