= SV Wiesbaden =

German football club

- Full name: Sportverein Wiesbaden 1899 e.V.
- Nickname(s): SVW
- Founded: 1899
- Ground: Helmut-Schön-Sportpark
- Capacity: 11,000
- Chairman: Markus Walter
- Manager: Daniel Löbelt
- League: Gruppenliga Wiesbaden (VII)
- 2022–23: Gruppenliga (VII), 7th (withdrawn)
Home colours	Away colours

SV Wiesbaden is a German football club based in Wiesbaden, Hesse. The team was disbanded in 1994 as the result of financial problems, but was rebuilt and eventually returned to the Hessenliga (V). Their home games are played in the Helmut-Schön-Sportpark.

== History ==
A football section was founded within the gymnastics club Wiesbadener Turngesellschaft in 1899. In 1904 the footballers left the club and founded the Sportverein Wiesbaden 1899.

In its early years SVW was one of the strongest teams in the Taunus region and sent Otto Nicodemus to the national side in 1909 for his only cap. The club became one of the founding members of the Nordkreis-Liga in 1909, playing in this league until the outbreak of the First World War and winning the league championship in 1911.

After the war however, the club had only limited successes, playing in the Kreisliga Hessen but never quite making it through to the German finals. Until 1933 they played in the Bezirksliga Main-Hessen but did only reach the playoffs of the Southern German championship three times. They were relegated from the new-founded Gauliga Südwest/Mainhessen in their first year.

After World War II the SVW needed time to rebuild a team and get their first successes. After 1950 they played in the 2. Liga Süd, which was the second level in the German league system. In 1951 Helmut Schön, who became the second postwar coach of the Germany national football team some years later, started his successful career in Wiesbaden. In 1962 the club was relegated to the Amateurliga Hessen. In 1970 they had become a bankrupt and were relegated to Landesliga Südhessen

In 1965 and 1966 the SVW played for the German amateur cup, the Deutsche Amateurmeisterschaft. But they lost both games against Hannover 96 Amateure with 0–2 (1965) and 1–2 (1966). These two games are the biggest successes the SV Wiesbaden has achieved in its history. More than 4000 supporter supported the team in both games. Although the club had invested a lot of money in the squad the club failed to qualify for the new Amateur-Oberliga. But they reached the promotion in 1982, but were relegated 1985. They qualified for the Amateur-Oberliga again one year later and played in this league until 1994. Because an investor had neglected a promise the club were deeply indebted and had to disbanded the first squad. They began their rebuild in the lowest class.

In 2004 the new team could promote to the Landesliga Hessen-Mitte again. Although the team reached a respectable 6th place in the first year, many players left the club and in the following season the SV Wiesbaden was threatened to be relegated, but could prevent the relegation. During the winter break 2006–07 the club got into financial trouble once more time and had to waive two of the best and most experienced players, because the club couldn't pay their wages anymore. Despite this weakening the SVW finished 8th in this season.

The side was relegated from the Landesliga in 2008 but returned to this level in 2011, after winning a championship in the Gruppenliga Wiesbaden and earning promotion to what is now the Verbandsliga. In 2013 it took out the Verbandsliga title to return to the Hessenliga but withdrew from the league to the Gruppenliga at the end of the 2015–16 season for financial reasons.

== Rivalries ==
The SVW supporters have two big rivalries to another clubs; SV Wehen Wiesbaden with whom they played a long time in the Oberliga Hessen. Currently the old rival plays in the 3. Liga and even the reserve team played, until recently, in the Oberliga Hessen. Another rival is FV Biebrich 02, a team from another quarter of Wiesbaden.

== Honours ==
The club's honours:

=== League ===
- German amateur championship
  - Runners-up: 1965, 1966
- Nordkreis-Liga (I)
  - Champions: 1911
- Kreisliga Hessen (I)
  - Champions: 1922, 1923
- Bezirksliga Rheinhessen-Saar (I)
  - Champions: 1925
- Landesliga Hessen-Süd (IV)
  - Champions: 1971
- Landesliga Hessen-Mitte (IV)
  - Champions: 1986
- Verbandsliga Hessen-Mitte (VI)
  - Champions: 2013
- Gruppenliga Wiesbaden
  - Champions: 2011

=== Cup ===
- Hesse Cup
  - Runners-up: 1976

== Notable coaches ==
- Helmut Schön (coach of the Germany national football team)
