= Bezirksliga Rhein =

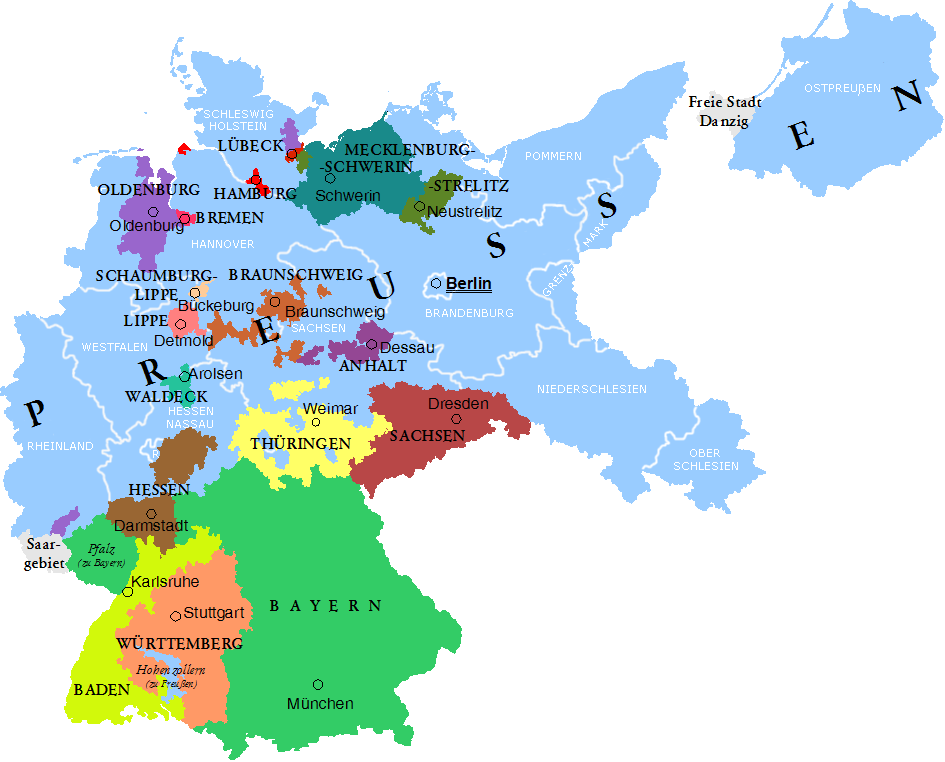
- Founded: 1923
- Folded: 1927
- Replaced by: Bezirksliga Rhein-Saar
- Country: Germany
- State: Baden; Palatinate
- Level on pyramid: Level 1
- Last champions: VfL Neckarau (1926–27)

The Bezirksliga Rhein was the highest association football league in the northern part of the German state of Baden and the Bavarian region of Palatinate from 1923 to 1927, when the league was replaced by the Bezirksliga Rhein-Saar.

== Overview ==
The league was formed in 1923, after a league reform which was decided upon in Darmstadt, Hesse. It replaced the Kreisliga Odenwald and the Kreisliga Pfalz as the highest leagues in the region.

The Bezirksliga Rhein, named after the river Rhine (German: Rhein), started out with eight teams, playing each other in a home-and-away round with the league winner advancing to the Southern German championship, which in turn was a qualification tournament for the German championship.

The league modus remained unchanged for its first three seasons, 1923–24, 1924–25 and 1925-26. For its last edition however, it expanded to ten clubs. Additionally, the leagues runners-up also qualified for a "consolidation" round with the other runners-up of the southern Bezirksligas. The winner of this round was awarded the third entry spot for the south to the German finals.

In an attempt to bring all Southern German leagues to a similar system, the Bezirksligas were reorganised in 1927. For the Bezirksliga Rhein, this meant, it joined with the southern clubs of the Bezirksliga Rheinhessen-Saar to form the new Bezirksliga Rhein-Saar. In practice, this meant little change for the league as the new Bezirksliga was immediately sub-divided into two independent, regional divisions. Out of the ten clubs in the league, eight went to the new Bezirksliga Rhein-Saar - Rhein division, only the FK Pirmasens found itself grouped into the Saar division of the new league while the SV Darmstadt 98 went to the new Bezirksliga Main-Hessen.

== National success ==
=== Southern German championship ===
Qualified teams and their success:

- 1924:
  - Waldhof Mannheim, 4th place
- 1925:
  - VfR Mannheim, Southern German champions
- 1926:
  - VfR Mannheim, 4th place
- 1927:
  - VfR Mannheim, 4th place Bezirksliga-runners-up round
  - VfL Neckarau, 4th place

=== German championship ===
Qualified teams and their success:

- 1924:
  - none qualified
- 1925:
  - VfR Mannheim, First round
- 1926:
  - none qualified
- 1927:
  - none qualified

== Founding members of the league ==
The league was formed from eight teams:

- Waldhof Mannheim
- VfR Mannheim
- Phönix Ludwigshafen
- FK Pirmasens
- Pfalz Ludwigshafen
- VfTuR Feudenheim
- Ludwigshafener FG
- Phönix Mannheim

== Winners and runners-up of the Bezirksliga Rhein ==
Season	Champions	Runners-Up
1923–24	Waldhof Mannheim	VfR Mannheim
1924–25	VfR Mannheim	Phönix Lugwigshafen
1925–26	VfR Mannheim	Phönix Lugwigshafen
1926–27	VfL Neckarau	VfR Mannheim

== Placings in the Bezirksliga Rhein 1923 to 1927 ==
Club	1924	1925	1926	1927
Waldhof Mannheim	1	3	4	4
VfR Mannheim	2	1	1	2
Phönix Ludwigshafen	3	2	2	3
FK Pirmasens	4	5	8	5
Pfalz Ludwigshafen	5	8		
VfTuR Feudenheim	6	7		
Ludwigshafener FG	7		5	7
Phönix Mannheim	8			10
VfL Neckarau		4	3	1
SV Darmstadt 98		6	6	6
SpVgg Mannheim			7	
FV Speyer				8
SpVgg Sandhofen				9

Source:"Bezirksliga Rhein". Das deutsche Fussball-Archiv.
