= SVK Beiertheim =

German sports club

- Full name: Sportverein Karlsruhe-Beiertheim 84/98 e.V.
- Founded: 1884/1898
- League: Kreisliga Karlsruhe (VIII)
- 2015–16: 13th
Home colours	Away colours

SV Karlsruhe-Beiertheim is a German sports club from the city of Karlsruhe, Baden-Württemberg.

It is known its women's volleyball team (second German division) and its association football teams.

== History ==
Founded as Fußball-Club Germania Beiertheim on 7 March 1898, the team was part of the early history of football in the city. Their name was changed to Fußball-Verein 1898 Beiertheim in 1907 and they played two seasons as a lower-level side in the top flight regional Südkreisliga in 1910–1912.

BFV remained part of local A Class football through the 1920s and on into the late 1930s but as a suburban side had limited success against larger city-based clubs. The football department of the postal workers sports club, SV Post Beiertheim, became part of BFV in 1937, but that did not prevent the team from slipping from upper level play.

The onset of World War II in 1939 led BFV to abandon play until after the conflict had ended. On 1 January 1990 they merged with the gymnastics club Turn- und Sport 1884 Beiertheim to create the present day side Sportverein Karlsruhe-Beiertheim 1884/98. The merged club currently plays in Kreisliga Karlsruhe (VIII) after promotion from Kreisklasse A1 Karlsruhe (IX) in 2014.
