= Sportfreunde Stuttgart =

Association football club

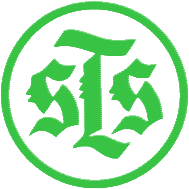
- Full name: Sportfreunde Stuttgart 1874 e.V.
- Founded: 18 April 1874
- Ground: Sportzentrum Waldau
- Chairman: Leo Weber
- Manager: Budak Özer
- League: Kreisliga B 4 Stuttgart (X)
- 2015–16: 6th
Home colours	Away colours

The Sportfreunde Stuttgart is a German association football club from the city of Stuttgart, Baden-Württemberg.

== History ==
=== 1874 to 1945 ===
The club was formed, as a gymnastics club, on 18 April 1874, under the name of Turnverein Heslach. In June 1889, the club changed its name to Turnverein Karlsvorstadt.

On 20 June 1896, a separate football club, the Fußballclub Karlsvorstadt, was formed. In 1900, it merged with two other clubs, the F.C. Adler and the F.C. Askania to form the Stuttgarter Sportfreunde 1896.

The club was a founding member of the Südkreis-Liga in 1908, then the highest level of play in the Baden-Württemberg region. In 1909 the club participated in the Sir Thomas Lipton Trophy in Italy, which is believed to be the precursor of the World Cup. The club existed there as a mid-table side but, in 1912–13, after a league reduction from 13 to eight clubs the previous season, it came last and was relegated. In this era, the club had Eugen Kipp in its ranks, who played 18 times for Germany between 1908 and 1913, 16 of those as a Sportfreunde player.

After the First World War, on 2 August 1919, Turnverein Karlsvorstadt and Stuttgarter Sportfreunde 1896 merged to form the current club, Stuttgarter Sportfreunde 1896. The team made a return to the highest league in the region, which was now the Kreisliga Württemberg and came third in 1919–20.

Sportfreundes most successful season came in 1921–22. It took out the title in its local division, the Kreisliga Württemberg having been split into two regional divisions. In the Württemberg-final, it managed to defeat Stuttgarter Kickers 1–0 and 3–2. From there, it advanced to the Württemberg-Baden championship, where it overcame Karlsruher FV 1–0 and 1–1. Advancing to the Southern German championship, it lost 0–1 to Borussia Neunkirchen in the semi-finals.

The next season saw the club missing out on qualification for the new Bezirksliga Württemberg-Baden and Sportfreunde was relegated to the second tier, where it stayed until 1926, when it earned promotion. The club managed to survive for four seasons in the Bezirksliga but was relegated once more in 1930. A fifth place in 1927–28 was its best result.

The club recovered from its temporary decline and, in 1933, it qualified for the Gauliga Württemberg, the new highest level of play in the region. It belonged to this league for the duration of its existence, until 1945. It this time, the club produced good results and finished runners-up in the league three times, never quite making it to the German championship finals.

=== 1945 to 2013 ===
With the resumption of football in Germany after the Second World War, Sportfreunde was grouped in the tier-two Landesliga Württemberg, which it won in 1946–47. This earned the club promotion to the Oberliga Süd, where it played for one last season in the top flight. The club came a distant last in the league in 1947–48, conceding 100 goals and being relegated back to the Landesliga. Sportfreunde became a mid-table side in this league, failing to qualify for the new 2nd Oberliga Süd in 1950 and thereby dropping another level to what was now the tier-three Amateurliga Württemberg.

The team continued to struggle against relegation but in 1954, it dropped down another level. The club made a brief recovery, earning promotion to the Amateurliga Nordwürttemberg in 1961 but being relegated again in 1964. After this, Sportfreunde never reached the higher levels of Württemberg football again, descending to the lower amateur leagues instead, to the extent that the new millennium saw it playing tier-eight football.

On 9 April 1987, the club changed its name to Sportfreunde Stuttgart 1874. The club suffered relegation from the Kreisliga A Stuttgart-Group 3 (IX) in 2008–09, finishing second-last. After two seasons in the Kreisliga B, the club returned to the Kreisliga A again in 2011. Since then the club has been achieving good results in the league, finishing runners-up in 2012 and 2013. It won promotion for a season to the Bezirksliga but was immediately relegated to the Kreisliga A in 2014 and the Kreisliga B in 2015.

== Honours ==
The club's honours:

- Kreisliga Württemberg (I)
  - Champions: 1922
- Gauliga Württemberg (I)
  - Runners-up: 1936, 1940, 1943
- Landesliga Württemberg (II)
  - Champions: 1947

== Recent seasons ==
The recent season-by-season performance of the club:

Season	Division	Tier	Position
2003–04	Kreisliga A Stuttgart-Group 3	VIII	10th
2004–05	Kreisliga A Stuttgart-Group 3	VIII	4th
2005–06	Kreisliga A Stuttgart-Group 3	VIII	11th
2006–07	Kreisliga A Stuttgart-Group 3	VIII	3rd
2007–08	Kreisliga A Stuttgart-Group 3	VIII	10th
2008–09	Kreisliga A Stuttgart-Group 3	IX	13th ↓
2009–10	Kreisliga B Stuttgart-Group 5	X	4th
2010–11	Kreisliga B Stuttgart-Group 5	X	1st ↑
2011–12	Kreisliga A Stuttgart-Group 3	IX	5th
2012–13	Kreisliga A Stuttgart-Group 3	IX	2nd ↑
2013–14	Bezirksliga Stuttgart	VIII	16th ↓
2014–15	Kreisliga A Stuttgart-Group 3	IX	11th ↓
2015–16	Kreisliga B Stuttgart	X	6th
2016–17	Kreisliga B Stuttgart	X	

- With the introduction of the Regionalligas in 1994 and the 3. Liga in 2008 as the new third tier, below the 2. Bundesliga, all leagues below dropped one tier.

↑ Promoted	↓ Relegated
