= Westkreis-Liga =

Südkreis-Liga
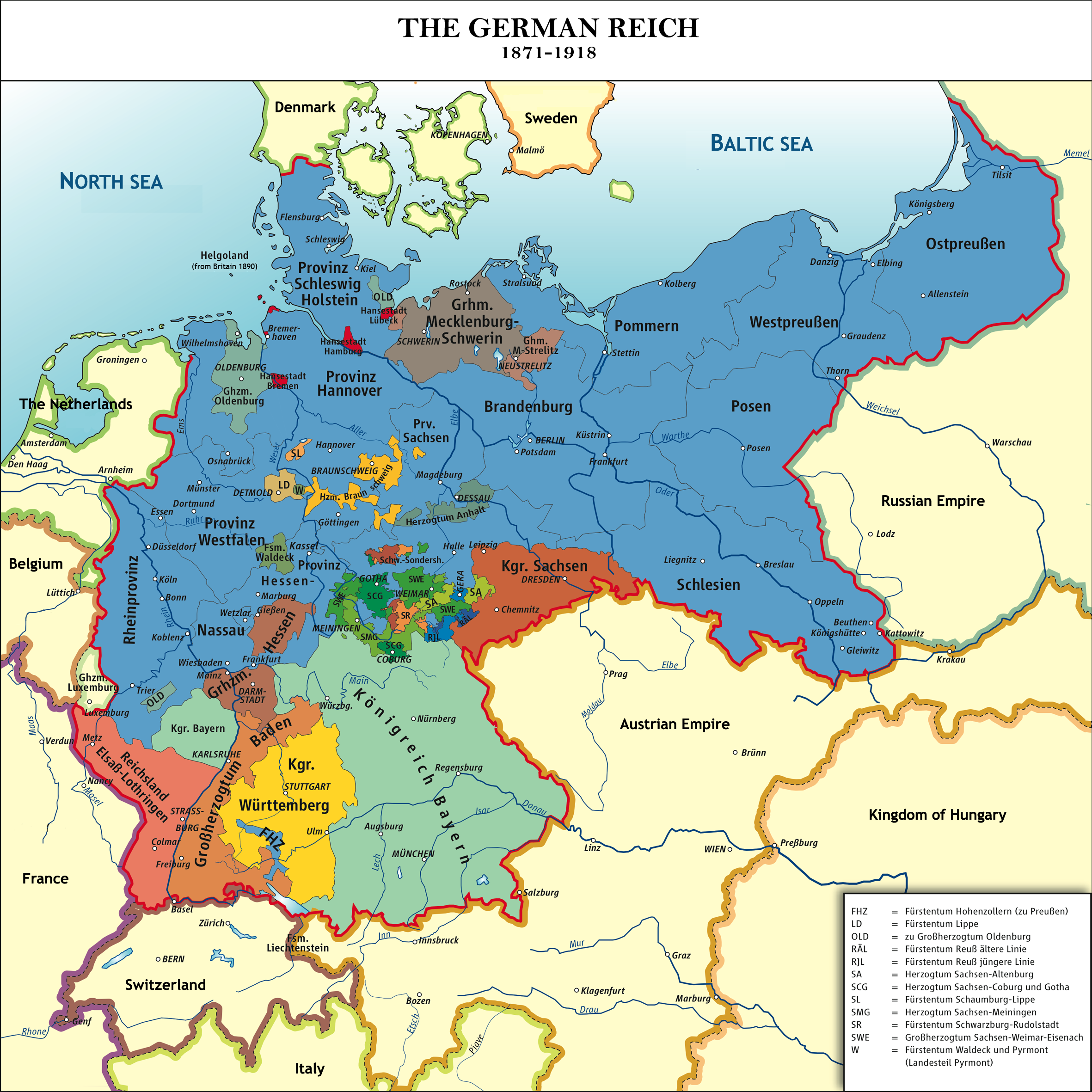
- Founded: 1908
- Folded: 1918
- Replaced by: Kreisliga Pfalz; Kreisliga Saar; Kreisliga Hessen
- Country: German Empire
- State: Alsace-Lorraine; Palatinate; Grand Duchy of Baden; Rhine Province
- Level on pyramid: Level 1
- Last champions: FC Phönix Mannheim (1917–18)

The Westkreis-Liga (English: Western district league) was the highest association football league in the Bavarian region of Palatinate, the northern parts of the Grand Duchy of Baden, the southern parts of the Prussian Rhine Province and parts of Lorraine from 1908 to 1918. The league was disbanded with the introduction of the Kreisliga Pfalz, Kreisliga Saar and Kreisliga Hessen in 1919.

== History ==
The league was formed in a move to improve the organisation of football in Southern Germany in the early 1900s. Within the structure of the Southern German football championship, four regional leagues were gradually established from 1908, these being:

- Ostkreis-Liga, covering Bavaria
- Nordkreis-Liga, covering Hesse
- Südkreis-Liga, covering Württemberg, Baden and Alsace
- Westkreis-Liga, covering the Palatinate, Lorraine and the southern Rhine Province

Until then, regional leagues had existed which send their champions to the Kreis finals and, from there, the winners went on to the Southern and German championships.

In 1908, the Westkreis-Liga was established, consisting of seven clubs from the Palatinate, playing a home-and-away season, these clubs being:

- FC 1900 Kaiserlautern
- FC Pfalz Ludwigshafen
- Palatia Kaiserslautern
- Ludwigshafener FG 03
- Germania Ludwigshafen
- Revida Ludwigshafen
- Bavaria Kaiserslautern

FC 1900 Kaiserlautern, the first league champion, qualified thereby for the Southern German championship, where it did not impress, finishing last with only one point out of six games.

In its second year, the league expanded to nine clubs, now spanning a wider area and including clubs from Mannheim and Darmstadt. In 1909-10, the league played in an unchanged format, but was reduced to eight clubs for the next season, a format it maintained until 1914.

In the last pre-First World War season, 1913–14, with the SpVgg Metz, a club from Lorraine joined the league.

The war starting in August 1914 meant an end to the league, no championship was played in 1914-15 at all. In the following three seasons, regional leagues operated, like before 1908. A Westkreis championship as well as a Southern German one was played, but no national title games were held.

With the end of the war in November 1918, football came to a halt once more. Lorraine ceased to be a part of Germany and the German football league system, being awarded to France. New leagues started to operate from 1919 and in the parts of the Westkreis still with Germany, the Kreisliga Pfalz, Kreisliga Saar and Kreisliga Hessen were formed.

== National success ==
The Westkreis was one of the weaker regions as football was concerned in this era, taking out no Southern German championships at the time and never qualifying for the German championship.

=== Southern German championship ===
Qualified teams and their success:

- 1909: FC 1900 Kaiserlautern, 4th
- 1910: Mannheimer FG Union 97, 3rd
- 1911: Mannheimer FG Union 97, 3rd
- 1912: FC Phönix Mannheim, Runners-up
- 1913: VfR Mannheim, 3rd
- 1914: VfR Mannheim, 4th
- 1916: FC Pfalz Ludwigshafen, Runners-up
- 1917: FC Pfalz Ludwigshafen, 4th
- 1918: FC Phönix Mannheim, Runners-up

=== German championship ===
None qualified.

== Winners and runners-up of the Westkreis-Liga and championship ==
| Season | Winner | Runner-Up |
| 1908–09 | FC 1900 Kaiserlautern | FC Pfalz Ludwigshafen |
| 1909–10 | Mannheimer FG Union 97 | FV Kaiserslautern |
| 1910–11 | Mannheimer FG Union 97 | Mannheimer FC Viktoria 97 |
| 1911–12 | FC Phönix Mannheim | FV Kaiserslautern |
| 1912–13 | VfR Mannheim | FC Phönix Mannheim |
| 1913–14 | VfR Mannheim | FC Phönix Mannheim |
| 1914–15 | not held | |
| 1915–16 | FC Pfalz Ludwigshafen | FC Phönix Mannheim |
| 1916–17 | FC Pfalz Ludwigshafen | FC Phönix Mannheim |
| 1917–18 | FC Phönix Mannheim | FC Alemannia Worms |
| 1918–19 | not held | |

== Placings in the Westkreis-Liga 1908-14 ==
| Club | 1909 | 1910 | 1911 | 1912 | 1913 | 1914 |
|---|---|---|---|---|---|---|
| FC 1900 Kaiserlautern ^{1} | 1 | | | | | |
| FC Pfalz Ludwigshafen | 2 | 8 | 4 | 4 | 6 | 5 |
| Palatia Kaiserslautern ^{1} | 3 | | | | | |
| Ludwigshafener FG 03 | 4 | 7 | 6 | 5 | 3 | 6 |
| Germania Ludwigshafen | 5 | 9 | 9 | 7 | | |
| Revida Ludwigshafen | 6 | | | | | |
| Bavaria Kaiserslautern ^{1} | 7 | | | | | |
| Mannheimer FG Union 97 ^{2} | | 1 | 1 | | | |
| FV Kaiserslautern ^{1} | | 2 | 3 | 2 | 5 | 4 |
| FC Phönix Mannheim | | 3 | 7 | 1 | 2 | 2 |
| Union VfB Mannheim 97 | | 4 | 5 | | | |
| FC Olympia Darmstadt | | 5 | 8 | 6 | 8 | |
| Mannheimer FC Viktoria 97 ^{2} | | 6 | 2 | | | |
| VfR Mannheim | | | | 3 | 1 | 1 |
| Phönix Ludwigshafen | | | | 8 | 4 | 3 |
| Borussia Neunkirchen | | | | | 7 | 7 |
| SpVgg Metz ^{3} | | | | | | 8 |

- ^{1} In 1909, FC 1900 merged with FC Palatia and FC Bavaria to form FV Kaiserslautern. In 1929, this club merged with SV Phönix to form 1. FC Kaiserslautern.
- ^{2} In 1911, FG Union 97 merged with FC Viktoria 97 and FG 1896 to form VfR Mannheim.
- ^{3} SpVgg Metz (sometimes SV Metz) players formed Cercle Athlétique Messin in 1919, which evolved to become FC Metz in 1932.
