= Südkreis-Liga =

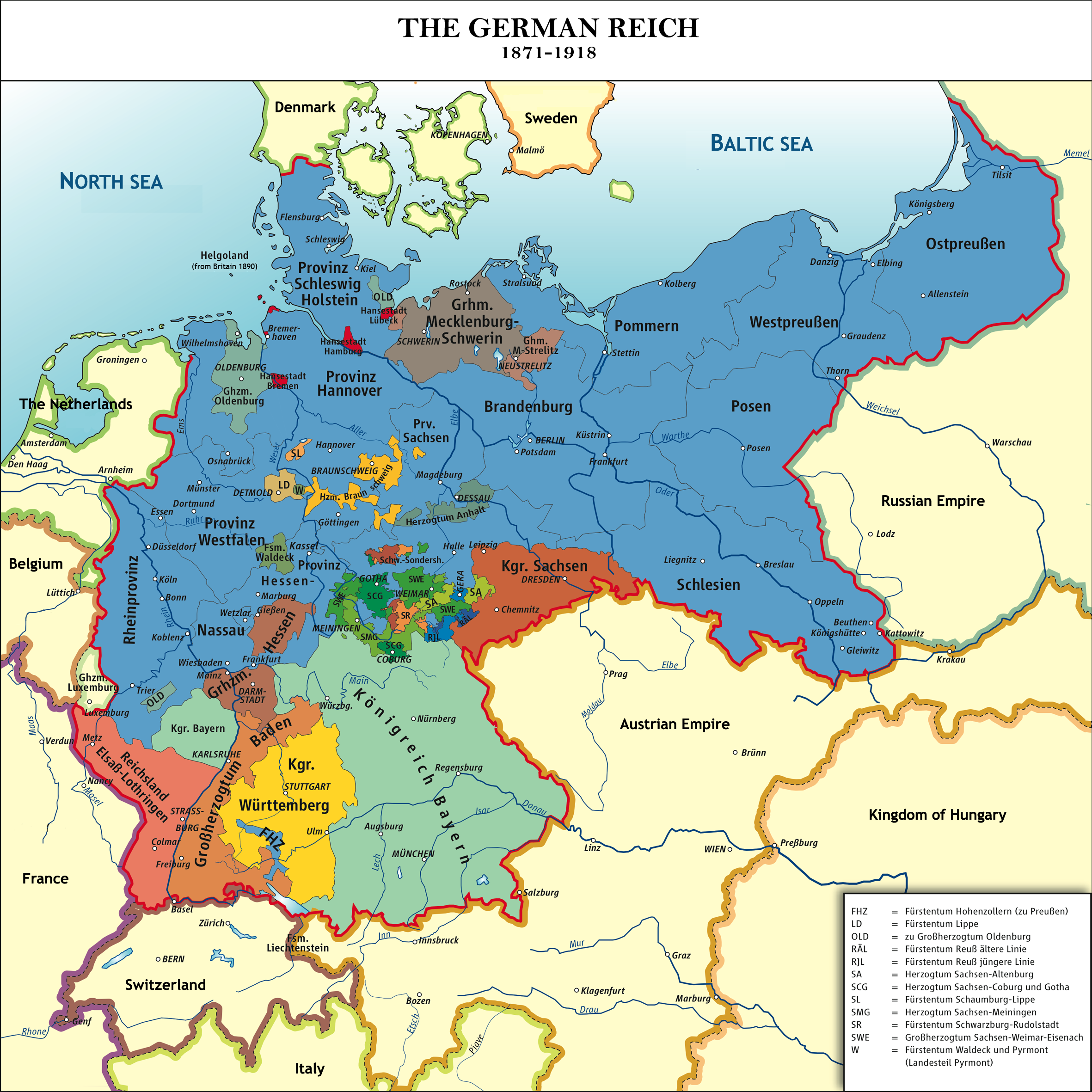
- Founded: 1908
- Folded: 1918
- Replaced by: Kreisliga Südwest; Kreisliga Württemberg
- Country: German Empire
- State: Alsace-Lorraine; Province of Hohenzollern; Grand Duchy of Baden; Württemberg
- Level on pyramid: Level 1
- Last champions: Union Stuttgart (1917–18)

The Südkreis-Liga (English: Southern district league) was the highest association football league in the German Kingdom of Württemberg, Grand Duchy of Baden, the Province of Hohenzollern and Alsace-Lorraine from 1908 to 1918. The league was disbanded with the introduction of the Kreisliga Südwest and Kreisliga Württemberg in 1919.

== History ==
The league was formed in a move to improve the organisation of football in Southern Germany in the early 1900s. Within the structure of the Southern German football championship, four regional leagues were gradually established from 1908, these being:

- Ostkreis-Liga, covering Bavaria
- Nordkreis-Liga, covering Hesse
- Südkreis-Liga, covering Württemberg, Baden and Alsace
- Westkreis-Liga, covering the Palatinate, Lorraine and the southern Rhine Province

Until then, regional leagues had existed which send their champions to the Kreis finals and, from there, the winners went on to the Southern and German championships.

In 1908, the Südkreis-Liga was established, consisting of ten clubs and playing a home-and-away season, these clubs being:

- Phönix Karlsruhe
- Kickers Stuttgart
- 1. FC Pforzheim
- Karlsruher FV
- Mannheimer FC Viktoria
- FC Alemannia Karlsruhe
- Sportfreunde Stuttgart
- Freiburger FC
- Union VfB 97 Mannheim
- FG 96 Mannheim

An eleventh club, the FV Straßburg, withdrew before the start of the season. Phönix Karlsruhe, the first league champion, qualified thereby for the Southern German championship, which it won, finishing ahead of 1. FC Nürnberg. From there, the club moved on to the German finals, where BFC Viktoria 89 could be beaten, making the club German champions.

In its second year, the league operated with only nine clubs, with the Karlsruher FV bringing home another Southern and German title to Karlsruhe. In 1909-10, the league played with ten clubs again and Karlsruher FV once more took out the league title as well as the Southern German one. In the national title round, it failed in the semi-finals, being beaten by VfB Leipzig.

In 1911-12, the league played with eleven clubs and KFV continued its dominance, reaching the German final once more but losing 1-0 to Holstein Kiel in that game.

Now with eight clubs, the 1912-13 league champion, Stuttgarter Kickers, took out the Southern championship but only managed to reach the first round of the German finals, signaling the end of the dominance of the Südkreis-Liga in Germany. In the last pre-First World War season, 1913–14, Kickers won the league title once more but in the Southern finals, rising SpVgg Fürth proved to good and went on to win the German title as well.

The war starting in August 1914 meant an end to the league, no championship was played in 1914-15 at all. In the following three seasons, regional leagues operated, like before 1908. A Südkreis championship as well as a Southern German one was played, but no national title games were held.

With the end of the war in November 1918, football came to a halt once more. Alsace ceased to be a part of Germany and the German football league system, being awarded to France. New leagues started to operate from 1919 and in the parts of the Südkreis still with Germany, the Kreisliga Südwest and Kreisliga Württemberg were formed.

== National success ==
The Südkreis was one of the strongest regions as football was concerned in this era, taking out most Southern German championships at the time. On national level, the clubs from there were quite successful, too.

=== Southern German championship ===
Qualified teams and their success:

- 1909: Phönix Karlsruhe, Southern German champions
- 1910: Karlsruher FV, Southern German champions
- 1911: Karlsruher FV, Southern German champions
- 1912: Karlsruher FV, Southern German champions
- 1913: Stuttgarter Kickers, Southern German champions
- 1914: Stuttgarter Kickers, 3rd
- 1916: Freiburger FC, Semi-finals
- 1917: Stuttgarter Kickers, Southern German champions
- 1918: Union Stuttgart, Runners-up

=== German championship ===
Qualified teams and their success:

- 1909: Phönix Karlsruhe, German champions
- 1910: Karlsruher FV, German champions
- 1911: Karlsruher FV, Semi-finals
- 1912: Karlsruher FV, Runners-up
- 1913: Stuttgarter Kickers, First round

== Winners and runners-up of the Südkreis-Liga and championship ==
Season	Winner	Runner-Up
1908–09	Phönix Karlsruhe	Stuttgarter Kickers
1909–10	Karlsruher FV	Phönix Karlsruhe
1910–11	Karlsruher FV	Stuttgarter Kickers
1911–12	Karlsruher FV	Phönix Karlsruhe
1912–13	Stuttgarter Kickers	1. FC Pforzheim
1913–14	Stuttgarter Kickers	1. FC Pforzheim
1914–15	not held	
1915–16	Freiburger FC	Phönix Karlsruhe
1916–17	Stuttgarter Kickers	Straßburger FV
1917–18	Union Stuttgart	Phönix Karlsruhe
1918–19	not held	

== Placings in the Südkreis-Liga 1908–14 ==
Club	1909	1910	1911	1912	1913	1914
Phönix Karlsruhe	1	2	5	2	7	6
Stuttgarter Kickers	2	3	2	4	1	1
1. FC Pforzheim	3	4	6	5	2	2
Karlsruher FV	4	1	1	1	4	8
Viktoria 97 Mannheim	5					
Alemannia Karlsruhe	6	6	9	8		
Sportfreunde Stuttgart	7	5	4	7	8	
Freiburger FC	8	8	3	3	5	3
Union Mannheim	9					
FG 96 Mannheim	10					
FV Straßburg		7	8	10		
Union Stuttgart		9	7	6	3	4
FV Beiertheim			10	11		
FC Mühlburg				9		5
VfB Stuttgart					6	7
