= Nordkreis-Liga =

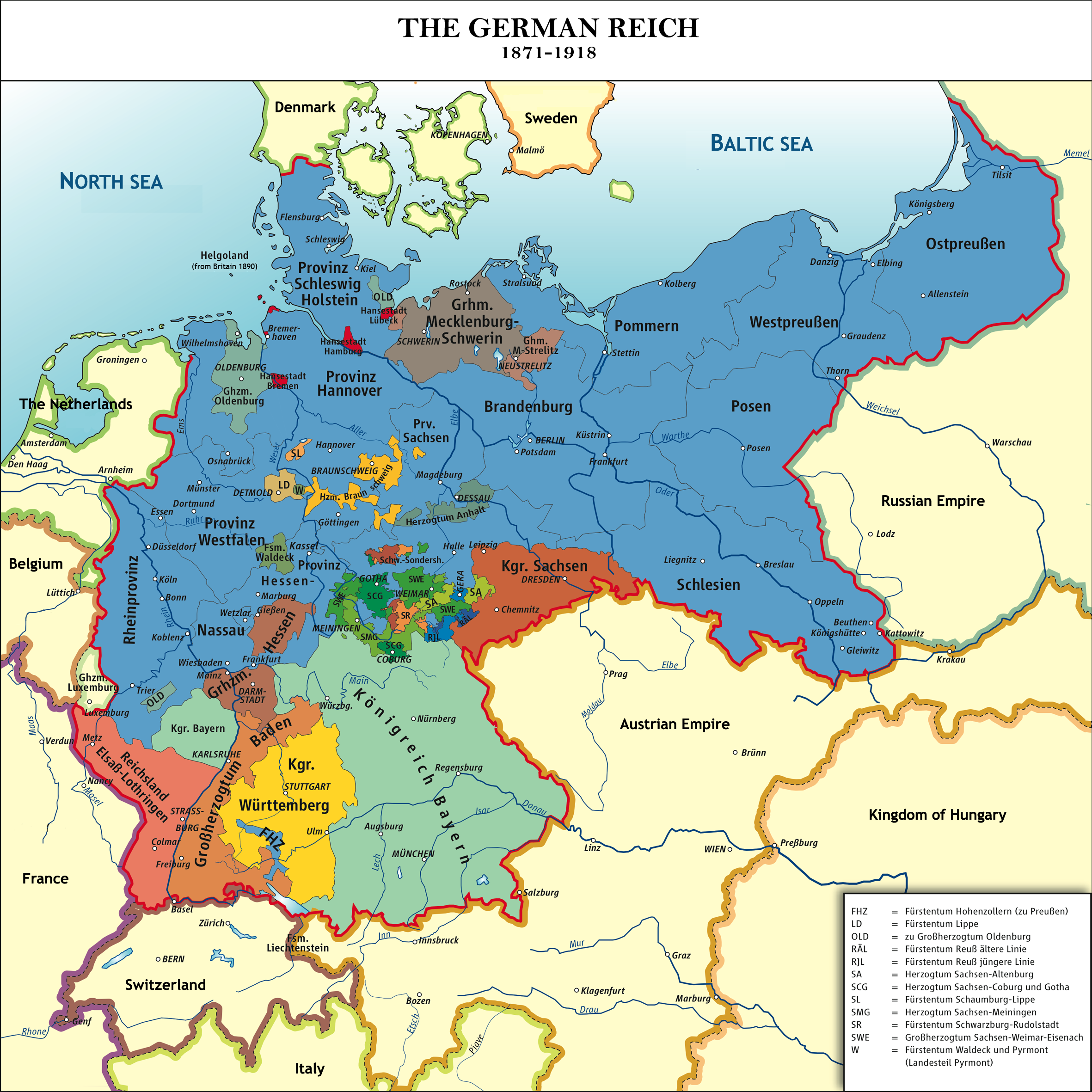
- Founded: 1909
- Folded: 1918
- Replaced by: Kreisliga Nordmain; Kreisliga Südmain; Kreisliga Hessen
- Country: German Empire
- State: Hesse-Nassau; Grand Duchy of Hesse
- Level on pyramid: Level 1
- Last champions: Amicitia 02 Frankfurt (1917–18)

The Nordkreis-Liga (English: Northern District League) was the highest association football league in the German Grand Duchy of Hesse and the Prussian province of Hesse-Nassau from 1909 to 1918. The league was disbanded with the introduction of the Kreisliga Nordmain, Kreisliga Südmain and Kreisliga Hessen in 1919.

== History ==
The league was formed in a move to improve the organisation of football in Southern Germany in the early 1900s. Within the structure of the Southern German football championship, four regional leagues were gradually established from 1908, these being:

- Ostkreis-Liga, covering Bavaria
- Nordkreis-Liga, covering Hesse
- Südkreis-Liga, covering Württemberg, Baden and Alsace
- Westkreis-Liga, covering the Palatinate, Lorraine and the southern Rhine Province

Until then, regional leagues had existed which send their champions to the Kreis finals and, from there, the winners went on to the Southern and German championships.

In 1909, the Nordkreis-Liga was established, consisting of twelve clubs and playing a home-and-away season, these clubs being:

- Viktoria 1894 Hanau
- SV Wiesbaden
- FSV Frankfurt
- FC Hanau 93
- Amicitia Bockenheim
- Kickers Frankfurt
- Kickers Offenbach
- Viktoria Frankfurt
- Germania Bockenheim
- Britannia Frankfurt
- Germania Bieber
- Fvgg Bockenheim

Viktoria 1894 Hanau, the first league champion, qualified thereby for the Southern German championship, where it came last out of four clubs.

In its second year, the league operated with thirteen clubs, with the Germania 94 Frankfurt joining the league. In 1911-12, the league played with twelve clubs again, Amicitia Frankfurt having been disqualified.

In 1912-13, the league was reduced to eight clubs and the Nordkreis champion, for the first time since the interception of the league, didn't come last in the Southern German finals, finishing second instead.

In the last pre-First World War season, 1913–14, things remained unchanged and champions Frankfurter FV finished runners-up in Southern Germany once more.

The war starting in August 1914 meant an end to the league, no championship was played in 1914-15 at all. In the following three seasons, regional leagues operated, like before 1908. A Nordkreis championship as well as a Southern German one was played, but no national title games were held.

With the end of the war in November 1918, football came to a halt once more. New leagues started to operate from 1919 and in the region that previously had formed the Nordkreis, the Kreisliga Nordmain, Kreisliga Südmain and Kreisliga Hessen were formed.

== National success ==
The Nordkreis was one of the weaker regions as football was concerned in this era, taking out no Southern German championships at the time and never qualifying for the German championship.

=== Southern German championship ===
Qualified teams and their results:

- 1910 German football championship: Viktoria 94 Hanau, 4th
- 1911: SV Wiesbaden, 4th
- 1912: Frankfurter FV, 4th
- 1913: Frankfurter FV, Runners-up
- 1914: Frankfurter FV, Runners-up
- 1916: FC Hanau 93, Semi-finals
- 1917: FSV Frankfurt, 3rd
- 1918: Amicitia 02 Frankfurt, Semi-finals

=== German championship ===
None qualified.

== Winners and runners-up of the Nordkreis-Liga and championship ==
Season	Winner	Runner-Up
1909–10	Viktoria 1894 Hanau	SV Wiesbaden
1910–11	SV Wiesbaden	FSV Frankfurt
1911–12	Frankfurter FV	FC Hanau 93
1912–13	Frankfurter FV	Viktoria 1894 Hanau
1913–14	Frankfurter FV	SV Wiesbaden
1914–15	not held	
1915–16	FC Hanau 93	FSV Frankfurt
1916–17	FSV Frankfurt	Amicitia 02 Frankfurt
1917–18	Amicitia 02 Frankfurt	FSV Frankfurt
1918–19	not held	

== Placings in the Nordkreis-Liga 1909-14 ==
Club	1910	1911	1912	1913	1914
Viktoria 1894 Hanau	1	6	4	2	5
SV Wiesbaden	2	1	7	5	2
FSV Frankfurt	3	2	3	4	6
FC Hanau 93	4	4	2	6	3
Amicitia 02 Frankfurt	5	9			
Kickers Frankfurt ^{1}	6	5			
Kickers Offenbach	7	3	5	3	4
Viktoria Frankfurt ^{1}	8	7			
Germania Bockenheim	9	8	9		
Britannia Frankfurt	10	11	8		
Germania Bieber	11	10	11		8
Fvgg Bockenheim	12	13	12		
Germania 94 Frankfurt		12	10	8	
Frankfurter FV ^{1}			1	1	1
SC Bürgel			6	7	7

- ^{1} Viktoria and Kickers merged in 1911 to form Frankfurter FV, which, in turn, formed Eintracht Frankfurt in 1920.
