= 1921–22 Eintracht Frankfurt season =

Eintracht Frankfurt
1921–22 season
- Chairman: Wilhelm Schöndube
- Manager: Dori Kürschner
- Kreisliga Nordmain: 1st / Eliminated in the Nordmain decider match
- South German Cup: 1st Round
- Top goalscorer: League: Willi Pfeifer (14) (Note: Eintracht's league records lack of 9 goals); All: Willi Pfeifer (14)

The 1921–22 Eintracht Frankfurt season was the 22nd season in the club's football history.

In 1921–22 the club played in the Kreisliga Nordmain, the top tier of German football. It was the club's 3rd season in the Kreisliga Nordmain.

The season ended up with Eintracht winning Kreisliga Nordmain for the third time in a row. In the Nordmain decider match didn't qualify for the South German championship.

== Matches ==
=== Legend ===
Win Draw Loss Postponed

=== Friendlies ===
30 July 1921	Eintracht Frankfurt (Germany)	0–2	(Germany) Frankfurter FV Sportfreunde 04	Germany
		Report	Goal

7 August 1921	Wetzlarer FC 05 (Germany)	0–3	(Germany) Eintracht Frankfurt	Wetzlar, Germany
			Goal

14 August 1921	Eintracht Frankfurt (Germany)	4–2	(Germany) VfR Mannheim	Frankfurt, Germany
	Imke; Bürkle o.g.'; Mölders (red card)	Report	Breitenbacher; Schmidt pen.'	Stadium: Sportplatz an der Roseggerstraße

20 August 1921	Essener SV 1899 (Germany)	1–2	Eintracht Frankfurt (Germany)	Essen, Germany
	Goal	Report	Goal

21 August 1921	Kölner BC 01 (Germany)	4–3	(Germany) Eintracht Frankfurt	Cologne, Germany
	Goal	Report	Goal

28 August 1921	Eintracht Frankfurt (Germany)	3–3	(Germany) Kickers Offenbach	Frankfurt, Germany
	Böttcher 15'; Szabó	Report	Maßmann; Keller; Bock pen.'	Stadium: Sportplatz an der Roseggerstraße; Attendance: 5,000; Referee: Berlepp

3 September 1921	Eintracht Frankfurt (Germany)	2–2	(Germany) Union Niederrad	Frankfurt, Germany
	Pfeiffer; Szabó	Report	Büttner	Stadium: Sportplatz an der Roseggerstraße; Attendance: 4,000; Referee: Guttmann

11 September 1921	Eintracht Frankfurt (Germany)	3–4	(Germany) Hanauer FC 93	Frankfurt, Germany
	Köster	Report	Kirchheim o.g.'	Stadium: Sportplatz an der Roseggerstraße; Attendance: 3,000; Referee: Berlepp

26 December 1921	Eintracht Frankfurt (Germany)	3–7	(Germany) Stuttgarter Kickers	Frankfurt, Germany
	pen.'; Zimmermann; Pfeiffer 55'	Report	Unseld 7' 67'; pen.'; Kehl	Stadium: Riederwaldstadion

1 January 1922	Eintracht Frankfurt (Germany)	1–1	(First Czechoslovak Republic) Teplitzer FK	Frankfurt, Germany
	Pfeiffer	Report	Olda 73'	Stadium: Riederwaldstadion; Attendance: 6,000; Referee: Christe

19 February 1922	Eintracht Frankfurt (Germany)	2–3	(Germany) Union Niederrad	Frankfurt, Germany
11:00 CEST	Szabó 33'; Pfeiffer 90'	Report	Rosenberger 23'; Wissenbacher; Büttner	Stadium: Riederwaldstadion; Referee: Christe

26 February 1922	Eintracht Frankfurt (Germany)	0–0	(Germany) Alemannia Worms	Frankfurt, Germany
		Report		Stadium: Riederwaldstadion; Attendance: 3,000

12 March 1922	Stuttgarter Kickers (Germany)	3–3	(Germany) Eintracht Frankfurt	Germany
	Kurz; Höschle 20'	Report	Pfeiffer 35'; Lindner	Referee: Witte

26 March 1922	Eintracht Frankfurt (Germany)	4–0	(Germany) Frankfurter FV Sportfreunde 04	Frankfurt, Germany
	Karl Schönfeld 37'; Szabó; Pfeiffer	Report		Stadium: Sportplatz an der Roseggerstraße

2 April 1922	Eintracht Frankfurt (Germany)	0–0	(Germany) SC Erfurt	Germany
		Report		Attendance: 4,000

9 April 1922	Eintracht Frankfurt (Germany)	1–3	(Germany) 1. FC Pforzheim	Frankfurt, Germany
	Pfeiffer	Report	Weißenbacher; Melchior	Stadium: Riederwaldstadion

14 April 1922	SC Victoria Hamburg (Germany)	2–3	(Germany) Eintracht Frankfurt	Hamburg, Germany
	Goal	Report	Goal

16 April 1922	Hannover 96 (Germany)	2–3	(Germany) Eintracht Frankfurt	Hanover, Germany
	Lages	Report	Szabó 12'; Füllgrabe o.g.'

30 April 1922	1. FC Nürnberg (Germany)	6–2	(Germany) Eintracht Frankfurt	Nuremberg, Germany
	Träg 10'; Wieder 52' 63'	Report	Schmidt o.g.'; Pfeiffer 75'	Referee: Nepf

6 May 1922 Tournament in honour of the celebration of the 30 year anniversary of Hertha and BSV 92	Hertha BSC (Germany)	1–3	(Germany) Eintracht Frankfurt	Berlin, Germany
	Goal	Report	Goal

7 May 1922 Tournament in honour of the celebration of the 30 year anniversary of Hertha and BSV 92	Berliner SV 1892 (Germany)	2–1	(Germany) Eintracht Frankfurt	Berlin, Germany
	Goal	Report	Köster	Referee: Krätzig

14 May 1922	Phönix Karlsruhe (Germany)	1–3	(Germany) Eintracht Frankfurt	Karlsruhe, Germany
	Goal		Goal

21 May 1922	Eintracht Frankfurt (Germany)	1–3	(Germany) Phönix Karlsruhe	Frankfurt, Germany
	Kirchheim 80' (pen.)	Report	Schwarzkopf 30'; 53'

26 May 1922	Eintracht Frankfurt (Germany)	1–1	(Germany) 1. FC Nürnberg	Germany
	Pfeiffer	Report	Sutor 40'	Attendance: 7,000; Referee: Christe

11 June 1922	Germania Marburg (Germany)	2–1	(Germany) Eintracht Frankfurt	Germany
	Adorf	Report	Goal

24 June 1922	Eintracht Frankfurt (Germany)	1–1	(Netherlands) AFC Ajax	Frankfurt, Germany
	Pfeiffer	Report	Goedecker 43'	Stadium: Riederwaldstadion; Attendance: 4,000; Referee: Christe

=== Kreisliga Nordmain ===
==== League fixtures and results ====
18 September 1921 1	FG Seckbach 02	1–2	Eintracht Frankfurt	Frankfurt, Germany
	Goal	Report	Szabó; Böttcher	Attendance: 3,000; Referee: Burkhartsmeier

25 September 1921 2	Eintracht Frankfurt	6–0	VfB Groß-Auheim	Frankfurt, Germany
	Imke 7'; Pfeiffer; Böttcher; Szabó	Report		Stadium: Riederwaldstadion; Referee: Hof

2 October 1921 3	Borussia Frankfurt	3–7	Eintracht Frankfurt	Germany
	61'; Damm	Report	Pfeiffer 10'; Köster; Egly pen.'; Imke; Böttcher 80'; Szabó	Attendance: 3,000

9 October 1921 4	Eintracht Frankfurt	2–0	FSV Frankfurt	Frankfurt, Germany
	Böttcher; Imke	Report		Stadium: Riederwaldstadion; Attendance: 7,000; Referee: Glaser

16 October 1921 5	VfB Friedberg	0–2	Eintracht Frankfurt	Friedberg, Germany
		Report	Pfeiffer 35'	Attendance: 1,500; Referee: Weingärtner

23 October 1921 6	VfR 01 Frankfurt	1–2	Eintracht Frankfurt	Germany
	Goal	Report	Goal	Referee: Angerer

30 October 1921 7	Eintracht Frankfurt	2–1	Hanauer FC 93	Germany
	4'; 14'	Report	Goal	Referee: Niederberger

6 November 1921 8	Eintracht Frankfurt	3–1	FG Seckbach 02	Frankfurt, Germany
	Pfeiffer; Lindner	Report	o.g.'	Stadium: Riederwaldstadion; Referee: Munk

20 November 1921 9	VfB Groß-Auheim	2–4	Eintracht Frankfurt	Germany
	pen.'	Report	2'	Referee: Maier

27 November 1921 10	Eintracht Frankfurt	1–0	Borussia Frankfurt	Frankfurt, Germany
	Kaiser; Lindner (red card)	Report	Daum (red card)	Stadium: Riederwaldstadion

4 December 1921 11	FSV Frankfurt	2–1	Eintracht Frankfurt	Germany
	Klumpp 1'; Heinig	Report	Szabó 80'	Referee: Späth

11 December 1921 12	Eintracht Frankfurt	5–0	VfB Friedberg	Frankfurt, Germany
	Pfeiffer; Szabó; Herber	Report		Stadium: Riederwaldstadion; Attendance: 2,000

8 January 1922 13	Eintracht Frankfurt	5–1	VfR 01 Frankfurt	Germany
	Pfeiffer 1'; Szabó 4'; Imke; Egly pen.'	Report	Huber	Attendance: 3,000; Referee: Knab

15 January 1922 14	Hanauer FC 93	0–1	Eintracht Frankfurt	Hanau, Germany
		Report	Pfeiffer	Referee: Blauth

==== League table ====
Pos	Team	Pld	W	D	L	GF	GA	GD	Pts	Promotion, qualification or relegation
1	Eintracht Frankfurt	14	13	0	1	43	12	+31	26	Qualification to Qualifier to the championship
2	FSV Frankfurt	14	9	2	3	37	16	+21	20	
3	Hanauer FC 93	14	7	3	4	28	13	+15	17	
4	VfR 01 Frankfurt	14	7	2	5	42	24	+18	16	
5	VfB Groß-Auheim	14	4	3	7	14	42	−28	11	
6	Borussia Frankfurt	14	2	4	8	26	36	−10	8	
7	FG Seckbach 02	14	2	3	9	14	26	−12	7	
8	VfB Friedberg	14	3	1	10	10	45	−35	7	

Source: RSSSF.com
Rules for classification: 1) Points

==== Results summary ====
Overall								Home						Away					
Pld	W	D	L	GF	GA	GD	Pts	W	D	L	GF	GA	GD	W	D	L	GF	GA	GD
14	13	0	1	43	12	+31	26	7	0	0	20	2	+18	6	0	1	23	10	+13

Source: Bundesliga

==== Results by round ====
Round	1	2	3	4	5	6	7	8	9	10	11	12	13	14
Ground	A	H	A	H	A	A	H	H	A	H	A	H	H	A
Result	W	W	W	W	W	W	W	W	W	W	L	W	W	W
Position	3	1	1	1	1	1	1	1	1	1	1	1	1	1

A = Away; H = Home; W = Win; D = Draw; L = Loss

=== South German championship round (Northern section) ===
==== Fixtures and results ====
29 January 1922 Nordmain decider match	VfL Germania 1894	2–2	Eintracht Frankfurt	Frankfurt, Germany
	Schreyvogel 30'; pen.'	Report	Donner 2' (o.g.); Szabó	Stadium: Sportplatz Sandhöfer Wiesen; Attendance: 10,000; Referee: Blauth

5 February 1922 Nordmain decider match replay	Eintracht Frankfurt	0–0	VfL Germania 1894	Germany
		Report		Referee: Römhild
Note: Abandoned after 71 minutes due to a snow storm

12 February 1922 Nordmain decider match replay	Eintracht Frankfurt	1–4	VfL Germania 1894	Germany
	Szabó	Report	Schreyvogel; Schnürle; o.g.'; Künhold	Referee: Lämmermeier

=== South German Cup DFB-Pokal / SFV-Pokal ===
13 November 1921 1st Round	Eintracht Frankfurt	1–2	Germania Mörfelden	Germany
	35'; 44' (pen.)	Report	Völtzer	Referee: Fränkel
Note: Since the first team rested and the reserves squads all had league matches on their owns the Schupo team played the cup match

== Squad ==
=== Squad and statistics ===
No.	Pos	Nat	Player	Total		Kreisliga		South German Championship round	
No.	Pos	Nat	Player	Apps	Goals	Apps	Goals	Apps	Goals
	GK	(Germany) GER	Knaus	4	0	3	0	1	0
	GK	(Germany) GER	Jean Koch	12	0	11	0	1	0
	DF	(Germany) GER	Edinger	3	0	2	0	1	0
	DF	(Germany) GER	Wilhelm Gmelin	1	0	1	0	0	0
	DF	(Germany) GER	Kraft	2	0	1	0	1	0
	DF	(Germany) GER	Walter Lemke	10	0	10	0	0	0
	DF	(Germany) GER	Lindner	11	1	9	1	2	0
	DF	(Germany) GER	Heinz Mölders	7	0	7	0	0	0
	MF		Friedel Egly	15	2	13	2	2	0
	MF	(Germany) GER	Rudi Kirchheim	10	0	8	0	2	0
	MF	(Germany) GER	Otto Knörzer	1	0	1	0	0	0
	MF	(Germany) GER	Emil Schneider	10	0	8	0	2	0
	MF	(Germany) GER	Karl Schönfeld	11	0	11	0	0	0
	FW	(Germany) GER	John Böttcher	15	4	13	4	2	0
	FW	(Germany) GER	Friedrich Dill	3	0	3	0	0	0
	FW	(Germany) GER	Karl Herbert	2	1	2	1	0	0
	FW	(Germany) GER	Paul Imke	15	5	13	5	2	0
	FW	(Germany) GER	J Köster	12	1	10	1	2	0
	FW	(Germany) GER	Willi Pfeiffer	16	14	14	14	2	0
	FW	(Hungary) HUN	Péter Szabó	16	8	14	6	2	2

=== Transfers ===
In:

No.	Pos.	Nation	Player
—	DF	GER	Edinger (from Darmstadt 98)
—	MF		Friedel Egly (from unknown)
—	MF	GER	Rudi Kirchheim (from Eintracht Frankfurt academy)
—	GK	GER	Knaus (from Eintracht Frankfurt academy)
—	MF	GER	Otto Knörzer (from Munich)
—	GK	GER	Jean Koch (from Eintracht Frankfurt academy)
—	MF	GER	Kraft (from unknown)
—	MF	GER	Lindner (from unknown)

Out:

No.	Pos.	Nation	Player
—	MF	GER	Fritz Becker (retired)
—	FW	GER	Jakob Dornbusch (retired)
—	MF	GER	Karl Jockel (retired)
—	DF	GER	Paul Brandt (to Berlin)
—	FW	GER	Ferdinand Neureuther (to SpVgg Fechenheim)
—	GK	GER	Robert Steiger (to FSV Frankfurt)

== See also ==
- 1922 German football championship

== Sources ==
- Matheja, Ulrich (2011). Unsere Eintracht - Eintracht Frankfurt - Die Chronik. Die Werkstatt. ISBN 978-3-89533-750-5.
