= 1920–21 Eintracht Frankfurt season =

Eintracht Frankfurt
1920–21 season
- Chairman: Wilhelm Schöndube
- Manager: Unknown
- Kreisliga Nordmain: 1st / Eliminated in the South German championship round (Northern section)
- South German Cup: 1st Round
- Top goalscorer: League: Péter Szabó (8) (Note: Eintracht's league records lack of 4 goals and 43 appearances); All: Paul Imke and Péter Szabó (9)

The 1920–21 Eintracht Frankfurt season was the 21st season in the club's football history. It was the first full season under the name Eintracht after merging of Frankfurter FV and the gymnastics club Frankfurter Turngemeinde von 1861.

In 1920–21 the club played in the Kreisliga Nordmain, the top tier of German football. It was the club's 2nd season in the Kreisliga Nordmain.

The season ended up with Eintracht winning Kreisliga Nordmain for the second time in a row. In the northern section of the South German championship group Eintracht didn't qualify for the championship knockout stage.

== Matches ==
=== Legend ===
Win Draw Loss Postponed

=== Friendlies ===
1 August 1920	Kickers Offenbach (Germany)	2–1	(Germany) Eintracht Frankfurt	Germany
	Goal	Report	Imke

11 August 1920	Eintracht Frankfurt (Germany)	0–0	(Germany) Helvetia Frankfurt	Germany

15 August 1920	Eintracht Frankfurt (Germany)	1–1	(Germany) MTV München 1879	Germany
	Goal		Goal

21 August 1920	Ring Dresden (Germany)	0–1	(Germany) Eintracht Frankfurt	Germany
			Goal

22 August 1920	Eintracht Leipzig (Germany)	1–1	(Germany) Eintracht Frankfurt	Germany
	Goal		Goal

29 August 1920	Eintracht Frankfurt (Germany)	1–0	(Germany) FV Neu-Isenburg	Germany
	Goal

1 September 1920 Sportplatz an der Rossegerstraße farewell match	Eintracht Frankfurt (Germany)	2–1	(Sweden) Malmö FF	Frankfurt, Germany
	Neureuther; Schönfeld	Report	Goal	Stadium: Sportplatz an der Rossegerstraße; Attendance: 5,000

5 September 1920 Riederwaldstadion inauguration match	Eintracht Frankfurt (Germany)	1–1	(Germany) Freiburger FC	Frankfurt, Germany
	Goal		Goal	Stadium: Riederwaldstadion

25 December 1920	1. FC Pforzheim (Germany)	1–1	(Germany) Eintracht Frankfurt	Pforzheim, Germany
	Kreß	Report	Szabó 18'	Attendance: 5,000; Referee: Köhler

26 December 1920	Sportfreunde Stuttgart (Germany)	2–1	(Germany) Eintracht Frankfurt	Germany
	Goal		Goal

1 January 1921	Eintracht Frankfurt (Germany)	1–1	(Switzerland) Nordstern Basel	Germany
	Goal		Goal

25 March 1921	Eintracht Frankfurt (Germany)	4–2	(Germany) Kölner BC 01	Germany
	Goal		Goal

28 March 1921	Eintracht Frankfurt (Germany)	3–1	(Germany) Essener SV 1899	Germany
	Goal		Goal

1 May 1921	Eintracht Frankfurt (Germany)	3–1	(Germany) Phönix Karlsruhe	Germany
	Goal		Goal

7 May 1921	Eintracht Frankfurt (Germany)	1–0	(Germany) Borussia Neunkirchen	Frankfurt, Germany
	Böttcher	Report		Referee: Rettelbach
Note: Tournament to celebrate the 60 years anniversary of the gymnastics section of Eintracht Frankfurt

8 May 1921	Eintracht Frankfurt (Germany)	1–6	(Germany) Wacker München	Frankfurt, Germany
	Köster	Report	Goal
Note: Tournament to celebrate the 60 years anniversary of the gymnastics section of Eintracht Frankfurt

13 May 1921	Eintracht Frankfurt (Germany)	2–1	(Netherlands) Blauw-Wit Amsterdam	Germany
	Imke; Neureuther	Report	Goal	Referee: Ter Horst

=== Kreisliga Nordmain ===
==== League fixtures and results ====
12 September 1920 1	FG 02 Seckbach	0–4	Eintracht Frankfurt	Germany
			Goal

19 September 1920 2	Eintracht Frankfurt	3–1	VfL Germania 1894	Frankfurt, Germany
	Goal		Goal	Stadium: Riederwaldstadion; Attendance: 8,000

26 September 1920 Since Helvetia's player Wunderlich was capped for the international match Germany v Austria in Vienna the league match was played as a friendly and rescheduled for 20 February 1921.	Eintracht Frankfurt	1–0	Helvetia Frankfurt	Germany
	Goal			Attendance: 5,000

3 October 1920 3	Eintracht Frankfurt	1–0	Viktoria Aschaffenburg	Germany
	Goal			Attendance: 5,000

10 October 1920 4	VfR 01 Frankfurt	1–1	Eintracht Frankfurt	Germany
	Goal		Goal

17 October 1920 5	Eintracht Frankfurt	1–0	Germania Rückingen	Germany
	Goal

24 October 1920 6	Eintracht Frankfurt	1–1	FSV Frankfurt	Germany
	Goal		Goal

31 October 1920 7	Frankfurter FV Sportfreunde 04	1–1	Eintracht Frankfurt	Germany
	Goal		Goal

7 November 1920 8	Hanauer FC 93	1–3	Eintracht Frankfurt	Germany
	Goal		Goal

14 November 1920 9	Eintracht Frankfurt	0–1	Viktoria 94 Hanau	Germany
			Goal

5 December 1920 10	Germania Rückingen	1–1	Eintracht Frankfurt	Rückingen, Germany
	Goal		Goal	Referee: Meier
Note: Match abandoned after 75 minutes when home supporters invaded the pitch after a sending-off. The match was valued 2-0 in favour for Eintracht Frankfurt in an armchair decision.

12 December 1920 11	Eintracht Frankfurt	2–1	FG 02 Seckbach	Germany
	Goal		Goal

19 December 1920 12	Helvetia Frankfurt	2–0	Eintracht Frankfurt	Germany
	Goal

2 January 1921 13	Viktoria Aschaffenburg	1–1	Eintracht Frankfurt	Germany
	Goal		Goal

9 January 1921 14	Eintracht Frankfurt	4–0	VfR 01 Frankfurt	Germany
	Goal

16 January 1921 15	VfL Germania 1894	5–1	Eintracht Frankfurt	Frankfurt, Germany
	Schnürle 15' 60'; Schneider	Report	Böttcher	Stadium: Sportplatz Sandhöfer Wiesen; Attendance: 8,000; Referee: Brenner

23 January 1921 16	FSV Frankfurt	0–1	Eintracht Frankfurt	Germany
		Report	Imke	Referee: Albrecht

30 January 1921 17	Eintracht Frankfurt	3–1	Frankfurter FV Sportfreunde 04	Germany
	Imke	Report	Schildger	Referee: Rettelbach

6 February 1921 18	Eintracht Frankfurt	1–0	Hanauer FC 93	Germany
	Mölders	Report		Referee: Werner

13 February 1921 19	Viktoria 94 Hanau	0–1	Eintracht Frankfurt	Germany
		Report	Dornbusch	Referee: Witte

20 February 1921 20	Eintracht Frankfurt	1–1	Helvetia Frankfurt	Frankfurt, Germany
	Köster	Report	Maier 40'	Stadium: Riederwaldstadion; Attendance: 10,000; Referee: Brucker

==== League table ====
Pos	Team	Pld	W	D	L	GF	GA	GD	Pts	Promotion, qualification or relegation
1	Eintracht Frankfurt	20	12	5	3	31	18	+13	29	Qualification to South German championship
2	VfL Germania 1894	20	11	6	3	46	20	+26	28	
3	Viktoria Aschaffenburg	20	10	4	6	30	22	+8	24	
4	VfR 01 Frankfurt	20	10	4	6	29	24	+5	24	
5	Helvetia Frankfurt	20	8	6	6	24	20	+4	22	
6	Viktoria 94 Hanau	20	9	3	8	29	27	+2	21	
7	Germania Rückingen	20	6	4	10	22	27	−5	16	
8	FSV Frankfurt	20	4	8	8	20	26	−6	16	
9	Hanauer FC 93	20	5	5	10	28	32	−4	15	
10	Frankfurter FV Sportfreunde 04	20	6	3	11	24	30	−6	15	
11	FG 02 Seckbach	20	3	4	13	12	49	−37	10	

Source: RSSSF.com
Rules for classification: 1) Points

==== Results summary ====
Overall								Home						Away					
Pld	W	D	L	GF	GA	GD	Pts	W	D	L	GF	GA	GD	W	D	L	GF	GA	GD
20	12	5	3	31	18	+13	29	7	2	1	17	6	+11	5	3	2	14	12	+2

Source: Bundesliga

==== Results by round ====
Round	1	2	3	4	5	6	7	8	9	10	11	12	13	14	15	16	17	18	19	20
Ground	A	H	H	A	H	H	A	A	H	A	H	A	A	H	A	A	H	H	A	H
Result	W	W	W	D	W	D	D	W	L	W	W	L	D	W	L	W	W	W	W	D
Position	3	2	5	1	2	1	2	2	1	1	1	1	1	1	1	1	2	1	1	1

A = Away; H = Home; W = Win; D = Draw; L = Loss

=== South German championship round (Northern section) ===
==== Fixtures and results ====
6 March 1921 1	Eintracht Frankfurt	2–0	SV Waldhof	Frankfurt, Germany
15:00 CEST	J Köster; Szabó 50'	Report		Attendance: 8,000; Referee: Rossi

20 March 1921 2	1. FC Nürnberg	7–2	Eintracht Frankfurt	Nürnberg, Germany
	Bös	Report	Imke; Böttcher	Attendance: 10,000; Referee: Tusch

3 April 1921 3	Eintracht Frankfurt	4–0	Kickers Offenbach	Frankfurt, Germany
	Dornbusch 1'; Imke; J Köster	Report		Stadium: Riederwaldstadion; Attendance: 8,000; Referee: Rettelbach

10 April 1921 4	Eintracht Frankfurt	0–1	1. FC Nürnberg	Frankfurt, Germany
		Report	Popp	Stadium: Riederwaldstadion; Attendance: 15,000; Referee: Niederberger

17 April 1921 5	SV Waldhof	2–0	Eintracht Frankfurt	Germany
	Höger	Report		Attendance: 6,000; Referee: Dämmermann

24 April 1921 6	Kickers Offenbach	3–2	Eintracht Frankfurt	Germany
	Goal	Report	Neureuther	Referee: Albrecht

==== Table ====
Team	Pld	W	D	L	GF	GA	GD	Pts
1. FC Nürnberg	6	5	1	0	20	4	+16	11
SV Waldhof	6	3	1	2	11	9	+2	7
Eintracht Frankfurt	6	2	0	4	10	13	−3	4
Kickers Offenbach	6	1	0	5	6	21	−15	2

=== South German Cup DFB-Pokal / SFV-Pokal ===
21 February 1921 1st Round	KV Mühlheim	3–1	Eintracht Frankfurt	Mühlheim, Germany
	Spahn 30'; Müller 55'; Lotz		Dill	Stadium: Sportplatz an der Roten Warte; Referee: Bachmann
Note: Since the first team played the replay match v Helvetia Frankfurt, Eintracht played the cup match with the reserve team

== Squad ==
=== Squad and statistics ===
No.	Pos	Nat	Player	Total		Kreisliga		South German Championship round	
No.	Pos	Nat	Player	Apps	Goals	Apps	Goals	Apps	Goals
	GK	(Germany) GER	Wilhelm Gmelin	11	0	5	0	6	0
	GK	(Germany) GER	Robert Steiger	15	0	15	0	0	0
	DF	(Germany) GER	Paul Brandt	21	0	16	0	5	0
	DF	(Germany) GER	Willi Pfeiffer	21	0	15	0	6	0
	MF	(Germany) GER	Fritz Becker	5	0	5	0	0	0
	MF	(Germany) GER	Karl Jockel	22	2	16	2	6	0
	MF	(Germany) GER	Heiner Roth	1	0	1	0	0	0
	MF	(Germany) GER	Emil Schneider	19	0	13	0	6	0
	FW	(Germany) GER	Karl Schönfeld	15	0	9	0	6	0
	FW	(Germany) GER	John Böttcher	22	2	16	1	6	1
	FW	(Germany) GER	Friedrich Dill	3	0	2	0	1	0
	FW	(Germany) GER	Jakob Dornbusch	11	3	7	1	4	2
	FW	(Germany) GER	Paul Imke	17	9	11	7	6	2
	FW	(Germany) GER	J Köster	17	3	12	1	5	2
	FW	(Germany) GER	Heinz Mölders	14	2	13	2	1	0
	FW	(Germany) GER	Ferdinand Neureuther	8	7	6	5	2	2
	FW	(Hungary) HUN	Péter Szabó	21	9	15	8	6	1

=== Transfers ===
In:

No.	Pos.	Nation	Player
—	FW	GER	John Böttcher (from unknown)
—	FW	GER	Heinz Mölders (from unknown)
—	FW	GER	Friedrich Dill (from Eintracht Frankfurt II)
—	FW	GER	J Köster (from Hannover 96)
—	GK	GER	Robert Steiger (from FSV Frankfurt)
—	FW	HUN	Péter Szabó (from 1. FC Nürnberg)

Out:

No.	Pos.	Nation	Player
—	FW	GER	Philipp Hohmann (to unknown)
—	FW	GER	Karl Reußwig (to unknown)

== See also ==
- 1921 German football championship

== Sources ==
- Matheja, Ulrich (2011). Unsere Eintracht - Eintracht Frankfurt - Die Chronik. Die Werkstatt. ISBN 978-3-89533-750-5.
