= 1935–36 Gauliga =

Gauliga
- Season: 1935–36
- Champions: 16 regional winners
- German champions: 1. FC Nürnberg; 6th German title

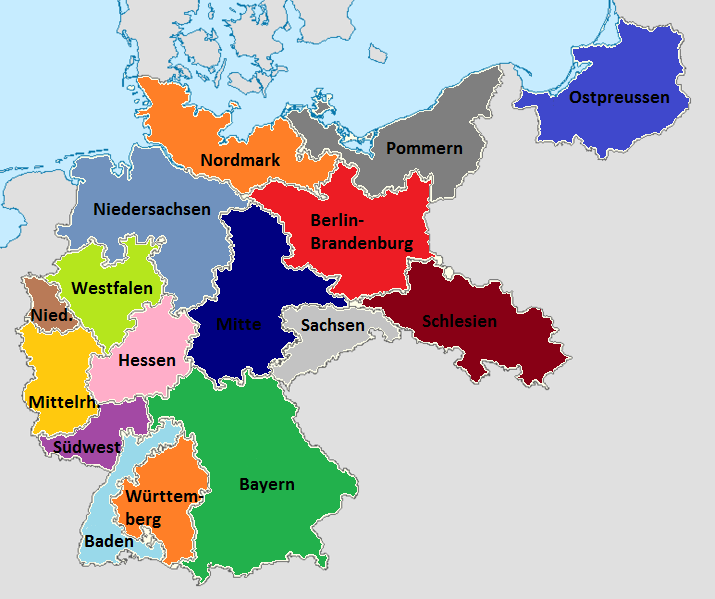
The initial 16 districts of the Gauliga in 1933

The 1935–36 Gauliga was the third season of the Gauliga, the first tier of the football league system in Germany from 1933 to 1945.

The league operated in sixteen regional divisions, of which two, the Gauliga Ostpreußen and Gauliga Pommern, were sub-divided into four and two regional groups respectively, with the league containing 183 clubs all up, eleven more than the previous season. The league champions entered the 1936 German football championship, won by 1. FC Nürnberg who defeated Fortuna Düsseldorf 2–1 in the final. It was Nürnberg's sixth national championship, the club's only one during the Gauliga era of German football from 1933 to 1945.

Three clubs remained unbeaten during the league season: Hindenburg Allenstein, FC Schalke 04 and 1. FC Nürnberg. Of those three Nürnberg would go on to remain unbeaten during the German championship as well while Schalke would suffer two defeats, one of them in the semi-finals to Nürnberg, while Allenstein would lose all six finals games. At the other end of the table only one club finished the season without a win, SpVgg Feuerbach. FC Schalke 04 scored the most goals of any Gauliga club with 94 while SC Dresdenia Dresden conceded the most with 72. FC Schalke 04 achieved the highest points total with 35 while SV Insterburg earned the least with two points to its name.

The 1935–36 season saw the second edition of the Tschammerpokal, now the DFB-Pokal. The 1936 edition was won by VfB Leipzig, defeating FC Schalke 04 2–1 on 3 January 1937.

== Champions ==
The 1935–36 Gauliga champions qualified for the group stage of the German championship. FC Schalke 04, Vorwärts-Rasensport Gleiwitz, Fortuna Düsseldorf and 1. FC Nürnberg won their championship groups and advanced to the semi-finals with the latter two reaching the championship final which Nürnberg won.

FC Schalke 04 and Eimsbütteler TV both won their third consecutive Gauliga titles while Hertha BSC, FC Hanau 93, SV Jena, PSV Chemnitz and Vorwärts-Rasensport Gleiwitz all won their second consecutive one. SV Waldhof Mannheim, 1. FC Nürnberg, SV Werder Bremen and Viktoria Stolp repeated their 1933–34 Gauliga titles with the remaining five winning their first.

Club	League	No. of clubs
SV Waldhof Mannheim	Gauliga Baden	10
1. FC Nürnberg	Gauliga Bayern (1935–36 season)	10
Hertha BSC	Gauliga Berlin-Brandenburg	10
FC Hanau 93	Gauliga Hessen	10
SV Jena	Gauliga Mitte	10
CfR Köln	Gauliga Mittelrhein	10
Fortuna Düsseldorf	Gauliga Niederrhein	10
SV Werder Bremen	Gauliga Niedersachsen	11
Eimsbütteler TV	Gauliga Nordmark	10
Hindenburg Allenstein	Gauliga Ostpreußen	28
Viktoria Stolp	Gauliga Pommern	14
PSV Chemnitz	Gauliga Sachsen	10
Vorwärts-Rasensport Gleiwitz	Gauliga Schlesien	10
Wormatia Worms	Gauliga Südwest	10
FC Schalke 04	Gauliga Westfalen	10
Stuttgarter Kickers	Gauliga Württemberg	10
