= Erwin Helmchen =

German footballer (1907–1981)

Personal information
- Date of birth: 10 May 1907
- Place of birth: Cottbus, Kingdom of Prussia, German Empire
- Date of death: 8 June 1981 (aged 74)
- Place of death: Kiel, West Germany
- Position: Forward

Senior career*
Years	Team	Apps	(Gls)
1923–1928	FV Brandenburg Cottbus	63	(184)
1928–1945	PSV Chemnitz	274	(527)
1945–1949	SG Chemnitz Nord	60	(82)
1949–1951	VfB Lübeck	18	(17)
Total		415	(810)
- * Club domestic league appearances and goals

Erwin Helmchen (10 May 1907 – 8 June 1981) was a German footballer who played as a striker. He is the second most prolific goalscorer in recorded history according to RSSSF with at least 989 goals scored in 582 official matches. He is also the second highest goalscorer in league matches with over 720 goals, the second-most prolific goalscorer for a single team with at least 667 goals, and the goalscorer with most career hat-tricks with at least 142.

== Club career ==
=== FV Brandenburg Cottbus ===
Helmchen started his career at FV Brandenburg Cottbus in 1923, at the age of 16. In Lower Lusatia, he played for FV Brandenburg in the finals of the South Eastern German football championship. However, the Breslau clubs Sportfreunde Breslau and Breslauer SC 08 dominated the competition. He scored at least 104 goals in 70 official games.

=== PSV Chemnitz ===
In 1928, Helmchen joined PSV Chemnitz. He scored 213 goals in his first five seasons at PSV in the regional championship rounds. However, they found fierce rivalry with local competitors Chemnitzer BC. In 1932, PSV managed to reach the Central German football championship final against Dresdner SC to win 3–2 after extra-time. Helmchen scored 51 goals in the championship for PSV, with a total of 120 goals in the 1931–32 season. PSV later participated in the 1932 German football championship, where they lost 2–3 to the eventual German champions Bayern Munich in the quarter-finals. However, Helmchen managed to score 5 goals in that competition to finish in second place behind Karl Ehmer.

The Gauliga Sachsen was inaugurated in 1933. In the debut 1933–34 season, PSV Chemnitz finished third behind Dresdner SC and VfB Leipzig. In 1934–35 and 1935–36 seasons, PSV Chemnitz managed to win two titles in the Gauliga Sachsen, both in front of the Dresdner SC. In the 1935 German football championship, PSV lost in the semi-finals 2–3 against the eventual winners FC Schalke 04, both PSV goals were scored by Helmchen. In total Helmchen scored 667 goals in 338 official matches for PSV Chemnitz.

In the 1935–36 Reichsbundpokal (de), PSV won against Gauliga Südwest/Mainhessen team in the final, with Helmchen scoring nine goals in total. In the 1936 German football championship group stage, PSV defeated Schalke 3–2 in front of 40,000 spectators in Dortmund's Stadion Rote Erde, and Helmchen contributed two goals to the win; however, Schalke managed to win 2–1 against PSV at Ostragehege to advance to the next round on goal difference. With a total of ten goals, Helmchen once again underlined his above-average qualifications in the final round. PSV was runner-up in the 1936–37 season, then third in 1938 and 1941, but it was no longer enough to make another entry into the final round of the German championship. However, PSV lost two Reichsbundpokal finals in 1936–37 against Gauliga Niederrhein and 1939–40 Gauliga Bayern teams, as Helmchen was a captain in the latter final.

=== Regional leagues ===
After the Second World War, Helmchen joined SG Chemnitz Nord in 1945, where Helmchen played for in Chemnitz regional competitions. The team finished first in 1947 and third in 1948. In the 1948–49 season, his team lost the finals against Meeraner SV. He was called up on 23 January 1949 in the selection game between Saxony and Berlin by Saxony coach Helmut Schön as a centre forward. He scored the last goals in the autumn round of 1949–50 in the state class of Saxony for SG Chemnitz Nord, which by then had changed it name once more to BSG Fewa Chemnitz.

Helmchen later moved to Schleswig-Holstein. First, he was at Eintracht Rendsburg and from February 1950 at VfB Lübeck, where he was a player-coach in the football league north. In the following season 1950–51, Helmchen won the championship with VfB in the Schleswig-Holstein-Liga, but failed in the promotion round to the upper league. In 1951–52, he won the state league championship again with VfB, but the return to the Oberliga Nord was not successful at the second attempt. He trained with the national league team SV Friedrichsort until 1956.

== International career ==
He was called up on 24 May 1931, in the German defeat 0–6 against Austria. In 1937, there were two more appearances in test matches before international matches: on 22 May in Stuttgart against Manchester City and on 24 October in Berlin against Gau Brandenburg. However, he did not feature in any of the national team matches, due to several reasons including injury, bad form, leaving a bad impression and, on one occasion, having to attend a wedding.

== Death and legacy ==
Helmchen lived with his wife Erna in the Elmschenhagen district of Kiel until his death on 8 June 1981, where he is also buried. The wish he expressed to want to rest under the ground of the Chemnitz Stadion an der Gellertstraße was symbolically fulfilled on 8 September 2001. On this day, Holstein Kiel and Chemnitzer met in the Regionalliga Nord for their first league game. The CFC fan club "Clubsurfer" carried out the "Lawn for Erwin" campaign, in which a piece of turf from the Chemnitz soccer turf was cut off and placed on Helmchen's grave in Kiel with a small devotion.

== Career statistics ==
Appearances and goals by club, season, and competition. Only official games are included in this table.
Club	Season	League			Regional Playoffs		DFB-Pokal		German Championship		Total	
Club	Season	Division	Apps	Goals	Apps	Goals	Apps	Goals	Apps	Goals	Apps	Goals
Brandenburg Cottbus	1923–24	South Eastern German football championship	-	-	—		—		—		7	16
Brandenburg Cottbus	1924–25	South Eastern German football championship	11	26	2	0	—		—		14	30
Brandenburg Cottbus	1925–26	South Eastern German football championship	20	49	—		—		—		21	49
Brandenburg Cottbus	1926–27	South Eastern German football championship	16	23	7	8	—		—		24	31
Brandenburg Cottbus	1927–28	South Eastern German football championship	12	21	7	10	—		—		20	25
Brandenburg Cottbus	Total		59	119	16	18	—		—		86	151
PSV Chemnitz	1928–29	Central German football championship	17	30	—		—		—		17	30
PSV Chemnitz	1929–30	Central German football championship	17	45	—		—		—		17	45
PSV Chemnitz	1930–31	Central German football championship	18	45	2	9	—		—		20	51
PSV Chemnitz	1931–32	Central German football championship	18	51	5	14	—		2	5	25	70
PSV Chemnitz	1932–33	Central German football championship	18	42	4	6	—		1	1	23	49
PSV Chemnitz	1933–34	Gauliga Sachsen	20	44	—		—		—		20	44
PSV Chemnitz	1934–35	Gauliga Sachsen	18	29	—		—		7	7	25	36
PSV Chemnitz	1935–36	Gauliga Sachsen	17	24	—		8	13	6	10	31	47
PSV Chemnitz	1936–37	Gauliga Sachsen	17	14	—		6	10	—		23	33
PSV Chemnitz	1937–38	Gauliga Sachsen		30	—		—		—			30
PSV Chemnitz	1938–39	Gauliga Sachsen		23	—		—		—			23
PSV Chemnitz	1939–40	Gauliga Sachsen		9	—		1	0	—			9
PSV Chemnitz	1940–41	Gauliga Sachsen		13	—		2	0	—			13
PSV Chemnitz	1941–42	Gauliga Sachsen		11	—		—		—			11
PSV Chemnitz	1942–43	Gauliga Sachsen		9	—		—		—			9
PSV Chemnitz	1943–44	Gauliga Sachsen		15	—		—		—			15
PSV Chemnitz	1944–45	Division 2		13	—		—		—			13
PSV Chemnitz	Total		232+	456	11	29+	17+	13+	16	23	269+	521+
SG Chemnitz Nord	1945–46	District League Chemnitz		37	—		—		—			37
SG Chemnitz Nord	1946–47	District League Chemnitz		2	—		—		—			2
SG Chemnitz Nord	1947–48	District League Chemnitz		5	—		—		—			5
SG Chemnitz Nord	1948–49	District League Chemnitz		10	—		—		—			10
SG Chemnitz Nord	1949–50	Div. 1 – Saxony		5	—		—		—			5
SG Chemnitz Nord	Total		54+	59	—		—		—		54+	59
VfB Lübeck	1949–50	Oberliga North	2	1	—		—		—		2	1
VfB Lübeck	1950–51	Landesliga Schleswig-Holstein	11	15	—		—		—		11	15
VfB Lübeck	Total		13	16	—		—		—		13	16
Career total			347+	629	32	51	23	40	16	23	418+	747+

== Honours ==
PSV Chemnitz

- Central German football championship: 1932
- Gauliga Sachsen: 1935, 1936
- Saxon Cup: 1935

VfB Lübeck

- Schleswig-Holstein-Liga: 1951, 1952

== See also ==
- List of men's footballers with 500 or more goals
- List of footballers who achieved hat-trick records
- List of world association football records

== Literature ==
- Gerhard Claus: 100 years of football in Chemnitz. Pictures, stories, tables . Chemnitzer Verlag, Chemnitz 1999, ISBN 3-928678-58-2.
- Gau selection competitions 1933–1942. In: Libero IFFHS, No. D 17, 1998, III. Quarter.
- Lorenz Knieriem: goalscorer. A typology of the executor. AGON Sportverlag, Kassel 2005, ISBN 3-89784-264-5.
- Hardy Grüne, Lorenz Knieriem: Encyclopedia of German League Football. Volume 8: Player Lexicon 1890–1963. AGON Sportverlag, Kassel 2006, ISBN 3-89784-148-7.
