= Fritz Gödicke =

East German footballer and manager

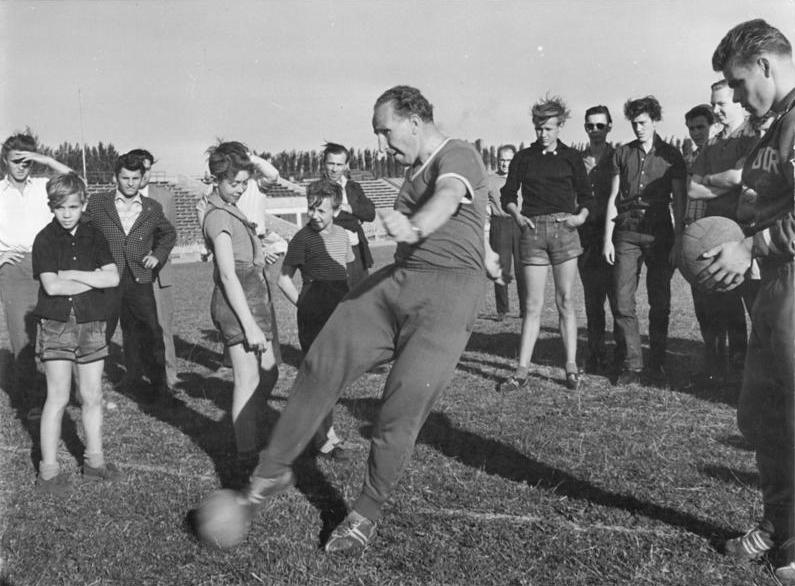
- Gödicke (center) in 1959.

Personal information
- Date of birth: 21 October 1919
- Place of birth: Zeitz, Province of Saxony, Germany
- Date of death: 28 April 2009 (aged 89)
- Place of death: Berlin, Germany
- Position: Defender

Youth career
- 1931–1933: Freie Turnerschaft Zeitz

Senior career*
Years	Team	Apps	(Gls)
1933–1945	TuRa Leipzig		
1945–1949	SG Leutzsch		
1949–1950	ZSG Industrie Leipzig		
1950–1951	Chemie Leipzig	20	(1)

Managerial career
- 1955–1958: SC Wismut Karl-Marx-Stadt
- 1958–1959: East Germany
- 1963–1965: SC Dynamo Berlin
- 1969–1970: 1. FC Union Berlin
- * Club domestic league appearances and goals as of 20 May 2015 (UTC)

Fritz Gödicke (21 October 1919 – 28 April 2009) was an East German footballer and manager.

In 1951 Gödicke was the shared winner (together with fellow footballer Werner Oberländer) in a poll conducted by the East German sports daily Deutsches Sportecho to determine East Germany's most popular sportsman.

== Honours ==
As player:

- DDR-Oberliga champion: 1950–51

As manager:

- DDR-Oberliga champion: 1956, 1957
