= Central German football championship =

- Founded
- 1902
- Disbanded
- 1933
- Nation
- German Empire
- Germany
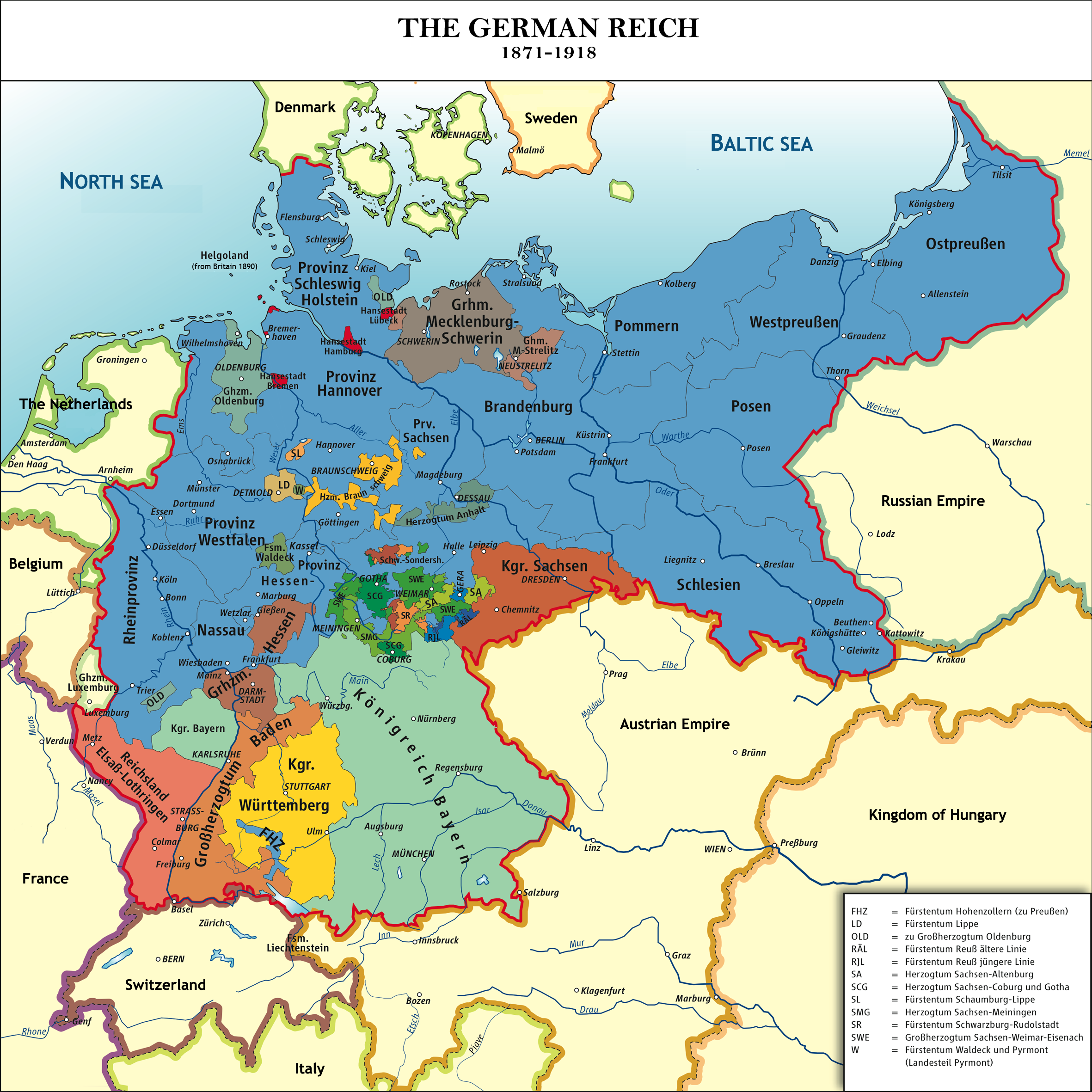
- Region
- Central Germany, Duderstadt, Neustadt bei Coburg
- Number of Seasons
- 31
- Replaced by
- Gauliga Mitte
- Gauliga Sachsen
- Level on Pyramid
- Level 1
- Last Champions 1932–33
- Dresdner SC

The Central German football championship (German: Mitteldeutsche Fußball Meisterschaft) was the highest association football competition in Central Germany, in what is now the federal states of Saxony, Saxony-Anhalt and Thuringia, established in 1902. The competition was disbanded in 1933 with the rise of the Nazis to power.

== Overview ==
German football was, from its beginnings, divided into regional associations, which carried out their own championship, which often pre-dated the national German championship. With the interception of the later in 1903, the former became qualifying tournaments for it but these regional championships still held a high value for the local clubs. These regional championships were:

- Southern German football championship - formed in 1898
- Brandenburg football championship - formed in 1898
- Central German football championship - formed in 1902
- Western German football championship - formed in 1903
- March football championship - existed from 1903 to 1911
- Northern German football championship - formed in 1906
- South Eastern German football championship - formed in 1906
- Baltic football championship - formed in 1908

All this regional championships were suspended with the rise of the Nazis to power in 1933. At the end of the Second World War, some resumed, now in league format. Others completely disappeared, like the Baltic championship, as the territories they were held in were not part of Germany any more. With the South West German football championship, a new regional competition also appeared in 1945. Ultimately, with the formation of the Fußball-Bundesliga, all this regional championships ceased altogether.

== History ==
=== Background ===
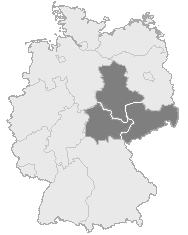
The region of Mitteldeutschland within the current borders of Germany

When the Central German championship was established in 1902, the region of Central Germany (German: Mitteldeutschland) was politically divided into a number of territories, the Prussian province of Saxony and the Kingdom of the same name being by far the largest:

- Duchy of Anhalt
- Kingdom of Saxony
- Province of Saxony
- Duchy of Saxe-Weimar-Eisenach
- Duchy of Saxe-Meiningen
- Duchy of Saxe-Altenburg
- Duchy of Saxe-Coburg and Gotha
- Principality of Schwarzburg-Sondershausen
- Principality of Schwarzburg-Rudolstadt
- Imperial County of Reuss

With the defeat of the German Empire in 1918 and the formation of a Republic, the former Kingdoms and Duchies became states. The number of small states in the Thuringia region formed the new state of that name, with the exception of Coburg, which joined Bavaria. The new states and provinces were:

- Free State of Anhalt
- Free State of Saxony
- Province of Saxony
- Thuringia

=== Football association ===
From 1897, a number of local football associations started up, the first of those being the Verband Leipziger Ballspielvereine in Leipzig. In late 1900, the Verband Mitteldeutscher Ballspiel Vereine followed, three month later, the Verband Dresdner Ballspiel-Vereine was formed in Dresden. In August 1903, the Verband Chemnitzer Ballspielvereine was formed in Chemnitz and, last, the Verband Plauener Ballspielvereine came into existence in Plauen. In 1933, all of those were disbanded by the Nazis.

== Competition ==
=== 1902 to 1919 ===
The Central German football championship was first played in 1902, but little is known about the first year other than the final. The championship was staged as a knockout competition with a one-leg final at the end. Regional champions were determined to establish who the qualified clubs for the Central German championship were.

In 1903, in the second year of the competition, a German football championship was established, for which the Central champion was qualified. The team, VfB Leipzig achieved distinction by becoming the first German champions, defeating DFC Prag 7–2 in the final and establishing Central Germany as an early power house of German football. VfB became the dominant side in the pre-First World War era of the competition, also winning another German title in 1906 and 1913 and making a losing appearance in the 1911 and 1914 final. No other club from Central Germany enjoyed a similar form of success and not until the Dresdner SC in 1943 and 1944 did another club from the region win the national title.

From 1903, three teams took part in the championship, the champions of the Leipzig, Dresden and Magdeburg region. This was expanded to four teams when the champion of the Chemnitz area joined the Central German championship. From 1908, seven teams competed in the annual finals, making it necessary to establish a quarter-final round. In 1910, the competition was expanded to nine teams, the year after to twelve and in 1912 to fifteen. In its last pre-war season, 1914, 21 clubs participated, making a qualifying round necessary.

In 1913, a different system was used, splitting the region in two groups according to their playing strength. The winners of the two then met in a final, which was predictably won by the team from the stronger group. In 1914–15, competitive football was only played regionally and no German or Central German championship was carried out, the war having its effect on the game.

During the war years, until 1919, eleven clubs played each season for the Central German championship but national title games were not held.

=== 1920 to 1933 ===
In 1920, a new modus was employed to determine the Central champion. A group stage of six clubs, which played each other once, determined the winner. For the first time, no final game was held. The following season, the group stage was expanded to seven clubs, which was also the case in 1922.

In 1923, the championship returned to a knock out system with seven clubs participating. This was drastically expanded to 27 clubs for 1924 because of the fragmented nature of the league system in Central Germany with a large number of local competitions. While subject to changes, the number of tier-one leagues operating in the region at that time stood at 27, compare to five in the larger and more successful region of Southern Germany at the time. This system remained in place until 1928, when only 26 took part. The season after, 1929, 27 clubs entered again. The following years, the number of clubs kept fluctuating around the strength of 25, depending on the number of leagues in the Gaue, the local geographical subdivisions in the region.

From 1925, the runners-up, later the Central German cup winner instead, were qualified for the expanded German championship, too.

=== Aftermath ===
The Central German championship was replaced with the Gauliga Mitte and Gauliga Sachsen by the Nazis in 1933, two of 16 new tier-one football leagues in the country. In the era that followed, the clubs from Central Germany saw an improvement in their performance, which can be attributed to the de-fragmentation of league football in the region and the increased playing strength of the two new leagues. A Central German championship was never held again.

After the end of the Second World War, Germany remained divided until 1991 and the former top-clubs of this competition, under new names, played in the DDR-Oberliga as part of the East German league system. After the reunion, the clubs from what was East Germany joined the united German football league system and the closest a competition now comes to covering the area of the former Central German championship is the tier-five NOFV-Oberliga Süd.

== Central German football champions ==
German champions in Bold:

| Season | Winner | Runner-Up | Result |
|---|---|---|---|
| 1902 | FC Wacker Leipzig | Dresdner SC | 6–3 |
| 1903 | **VfB Leipzig** | SV Victoria 96 Magdeburg | 1–0 |
| 1904 | VfB Leipzig | Dresdner SC | 4–0 |
| 1905 | Dresdner SC | Hallescher FC 1896 | 3–2 |
| 1906 | **VfB Leipzig** | Dresdner SC | Declared ^{1} |
| 1907 | VfB Leipzig | SV Victoria 96 Magdeburg | 1–0 |
| 1908 | FC Wacker Leipzig | SV Victoria 96 Magdeburg | 3–2 aet |
| 1909 | SC Erfurt | Hallescher FC 1896 | 5–4 |
| 1910 | VfB Leipzig | SC Erfurt | 4–1 |
| 1911 | VfB Leipzig | Hallescher FC Wacker | 3–1 |
| 1912 | SpVgg Leipzig | Hallescher FC Wacker | 1–0 |
| 1913 | **VfB Leipzig** | Coburger FC | 6–0 |
| 1914 | SpVgg Leipzig | VfB Leipzig | 2–1 |
| 1915 | not held | | |
| 1916 | SV Eintracht Leipzig | Hallescher FC Borussia | 4–0 |
| 1917 | Hallescher FC 1896 | Dresdner Fussballring | 2–0 |
| 1918 | VfB Leipzig | Hallescher FC 1896 | 2–0 |
| 1919 | Hallescher FC 1896 | Dresdner Fussballring | 2–1 |
| 1920 | VfB Leipzig | Hallescher FC Wacker | N/A |
| 1921 | Hallescher FC Wacker | SpVgg Leipzig | N/A |
| 1922 | SpVgg Leipzig | Chemnitzer BC | N/A |
| 1923 | Guts Muths Dresden | VfB Leipzig | 1–0 |
| 1924 | SpVgg Leipzig | Hallescher FC Wacker | 2–1 |
| 1925 | VfB Leipzig | 1. SV Jena | 2–0 |
| 1926 | Dresdner SC | SV Fortuna 02 Leipzig | 3–0 |
| 1927 | VfB Leipzig | Chemnitzer BC | 4–0 |
| 1928 | Hallescher FC Wacker | Dresdner SC | 1–0 |
| 1929 | Dresdner SC | Chemnitzer BC | 3–2 |
| 1930 | Dresdner SC | VfB Leipzig | 2–1 |
| 1931 | Dresdner SC | FC Preußen Langensalza | 6–0 |
| 1932 | Chemnitzer PSV | Dresdner SC | 3–2 aet |
| 1933 | Dresdner SC | Chemnitzer PSV | 3–1 |

- ^{1} Dresdner SC refused to play in Leipzig, VfB Leipzig declared the winner.
