= Eintracht Leipzig =

German association football club

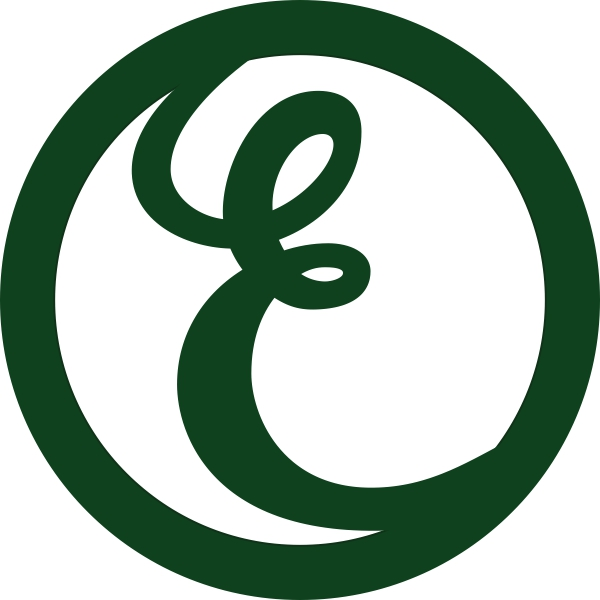
- Full name: Fussball-Club Eintracht 04 Leipzig
- Founded: 15 June 1904
- League: Nordost/Sachsen(Leipzig)
Home colours	Away colours

Eintracht Leipzig was a German association football club from the city of Leipzig, Saxony. Established on 15 June 1904, the club was a founding member of the city's Neuen Leipziger Fußball-Verbandes.

In the mid-1910s, Eintracht briefly broke the dominance of bigger Leipzig clubs including VfB Leipzig, Wacker Leipzig and SpVgg Leipzig. In 1915, Eintracht won the Leipzig/Nordwestsachsen district championship in a season shortened by World War I. In 1915–16, the club took first place after suffering only a single defeat through the season (0:1 to VfB Leipzig). The next season, Eintracht captured a third title by finishing just one point ahead of VfB.

The club's greatest honors came with their Central German Championship (Mitteldeutschen Meisterschaft) in 1916, defeating SC 1903 Weimar, Dresden SC, and Borussia Halle on their way to the title. As regional champions, Eintracht would normally have taken part in the subsequent final round of the German championship, but this was cancelled due to the ongoing war.

FC was renamed Sportverein Eintracht Leipzig in 1920 and were briefly joined by the membership of Turnverein Sűdvorstadt Leipzig which would quickly reclaim its independence as a separate side.

Until 1933, Eintracht continued to play in the Gau Nordwestsachsen (I). German football was reorganized that year into 16 top-flight regional divisions and the club was unable to qualify for the new Gauliga Sachsen (I), remaining in now second tier city-level play until being dissolved at the end of World War II in 1945.
