= Leipzig FC =

Leipzig FC may refer to several football clubs in Leipzig, Germany:

== Current ==
- RB Leipzig, founded 2009; as of 2026, a Bundesliga football team (top tier of German football)
- 1. FC Lokomotive Leipzig, founded 1893; as at 2026 in the Regionalliga Nordost (fourth tier of German football)
- BSG Chemie Leipzig (1997), founded 1997; as at 2026 in the Regionalliga Nordost (fourth tier of German football)

== Defunct ==
- TuRa Leipzig, 1899–1945
- BSG Chemie Leipzig (1950), 1950–1990
- FC Sachsen Leipzig, 1990–2011
