= 1935–36 Gauliga Bayern =

Gauliga Bayern
- Season: 1935–36
- Champions: 1. FC Nürnberg
- Relegated: 1. FC München
- German championship: 1. FC Nürnberg

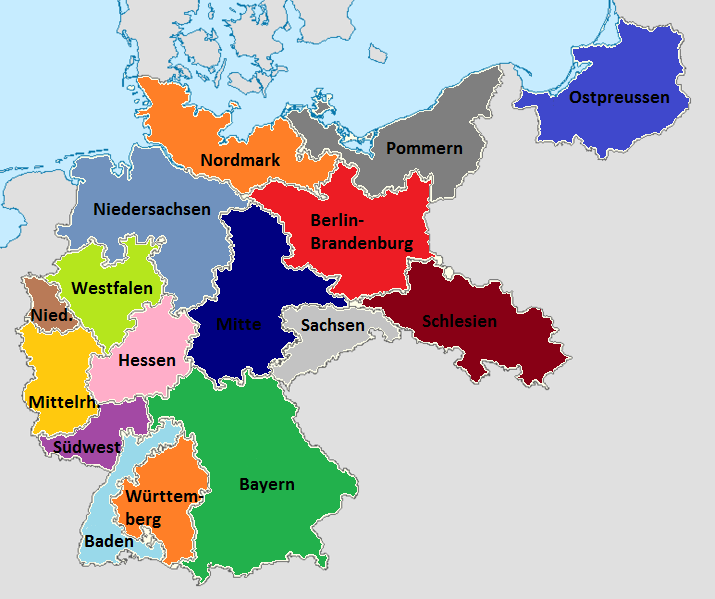
The initial 16 districts of the Gauliga with Bayern in green

The 1935–36 Gauliga Bayern was the third season of the league, one of the 16 Gauligas in Germany at the time. It was the first tier of the football league system in Bavaria (German:Bayern) from 1933 to 1945.

For 1. FC Nürnberg it was the second of seven Gauliga championships the club would win in the era from 1933 to 1944. The club qualified for the 1936 German football championship, where it finished first in its group with Wormatia Worms, SV Jena and Stuttgarter Kickers and qualified for the semi-finals. After overcoming defending champions FC Schalke 04 2–1 Nürnberg advanced to the final where it won 2–1 after extra time against Fortuna Düsseldorf. For 1. FC Nürnberg it was the eighth time the club reached the final, winning its sixth national championship, the only one for a Gauliga Bayern club.

The 1935–36 season saw the second edition of the Tschammerpokal, now the DFB-Pokal. The most successful Gauliga Bayern representative in the 1936 edition, 1. FC Schweinfurt 05, advanced to the semi-finals where it lost to FC Schalke 04 who, in turn, would lose the final to VfB Leipzig.

== Table ==
The 1935–36 season saw two new clubs in the league, 1. FC Bayreuth and 1. FC München and operated with ten teams, one less than the previous season.

Pos	Team	Pld	W	D	L	GF	GA	GD	Pts	Promotion, qualification or relegation
1	1. FC Nürnberg (C)	18	13	5	0	36	12	+24	31	Qualification to German championship
2	SpVgg Fürth	18	12	4	2	37	14	+23	28	
3	FC Bayern Munich	18	11	2	5	47	26	+21	24	
4	1. FC Schweinfurt 05	18	7	4	7	37	31	+6	18	
5	BC Augsburg	18	6	3	9	31	32	−1	15	
6	ASV Nürnberg	18	5	3	10	24	29	−5	13	
7	TSV 1860 München	18	5	3	10	24	34	−10	13	
8	FC Wacker München	18	5	3	10	21	36	−15	13	
9	1. FC Bayreuth (R)	18	3	1	14	20	39	−19	7	Relegation
10	1. FC München (R)	18	2	1	15	18	42	−24	5	Relegation

Source: claudionicoletti.eu
Rules for classification: 1) Points;
(C) Champions; (R) Relegated
