= Werner Oberländer =

German footballer and manager

Personal information
- Full name: Werner Oberländer
- Date of birth: 28 November 1921
- Date of death: 2002
- Position: Striker

Senior career*
Years	Team	Apps	(Gls)
- SpVgg Thale 04
- SC Preußen Thale
1946–1951	BSG Stahl Thale (Note: DDR-Oberliga games and goals only.)	42	(38)
1951–1956	Eintracht Braunschweig	82	(47)
1957–1959	BSG Stahl Thale		

Managerial career
- BSG Stahl Thale
- * Club domestic league appearances and goals as of 27 April 2012

Werner Oberländer (born 28 November 1921; died 2002) was a German footballer and manager.

== Career ==
After the end of World War II Oberländer played for BSG EHW Thale (later renamed Stahl Thale) in East Germany. In 1949–50 he led Thale not only to promotion to the Oberliga, but also contributed significantly to Thale's win in the East German cup that season, scoring a goal in the final. During the 1950–51 Oberliga season Oberländer scored 31 goals. In 1951 he was the shared winner (together with fellow footballer Fritz Gödicke) in a poll conducted by the East German sports daily Deutsches Sportecho to determine East Germany's most popular sportsman. Later that year, after scoring a total of 38 goals in 42 Oberliga games, Oberländer left East Germany. He joined West German Oberliga Nord side Eintracht Braunschweig until his return to East Germany in 1956, where he continued to play for Stahl Thale until 1959.

Oberländer also represented East Germany five times during the early 1950s, scoring two goals. However, since those games were played before the East German Football Association became a FIFA member in 1952, they are not considered official internationals.

== Honours ==
- FDGB-Pokal winner: 1949–50
