= LBC (disambiguation) =

LBC (originally London Broadcasting Company) is a national talk radio station in the UK.

LBC may also refer to:

== Academic institutions ==
- Lancaster Bible College in Lancaster, Pennsylvania, United States
- Lyman Briggs College, a residential college of Michigan State University

== Air travel ==
- Lübeck Airport, IATA airport code
- The ICAO airline designator for Albanian Airlines
- LBC Express, formerly Luzon Brokerage Corporation, an air cargo, courier and money remittance company of the Philippines

== Broadcasting ==
- LBC News, a rolling news radio station broadcasting on DAB+ across the United Kingdom
- Lebanese Broadcasting Corporation, a television station based in Lebanon broadcasting in the Middle East, Europe, Australia and America

== Other uses ==
- LBC Crew, a short-lived collective of Long Beach–based rappers
- Left Book Club, British book publisher active 1936–1948, revived 2015
- Leipziger BC 1893, a defunct German football club
- London Borough Council, local government administrations in Greater London excluding the Corporation of London
- The London Borough of Camden
- The London Borough of Croydon
- The London Brick Company
- The London Buddhist Centre
- The London Bulgarian Choir
- Long Beach, California, also known as "The LBC"
- Lucky Boys Confusion, a rock band from the Chicago suburbs
- LBRY credits, the cryptocurrency maintained by LBRY

== See also ==
- Live in the LBC & Diamonds in the Rough, a 2008 live album by Avenged Sevenfold
