= Stadion an der Gellertstraße =

Football stadium in Chemnitz, Germany

Stadion Chemnitz
- Fischerwiese
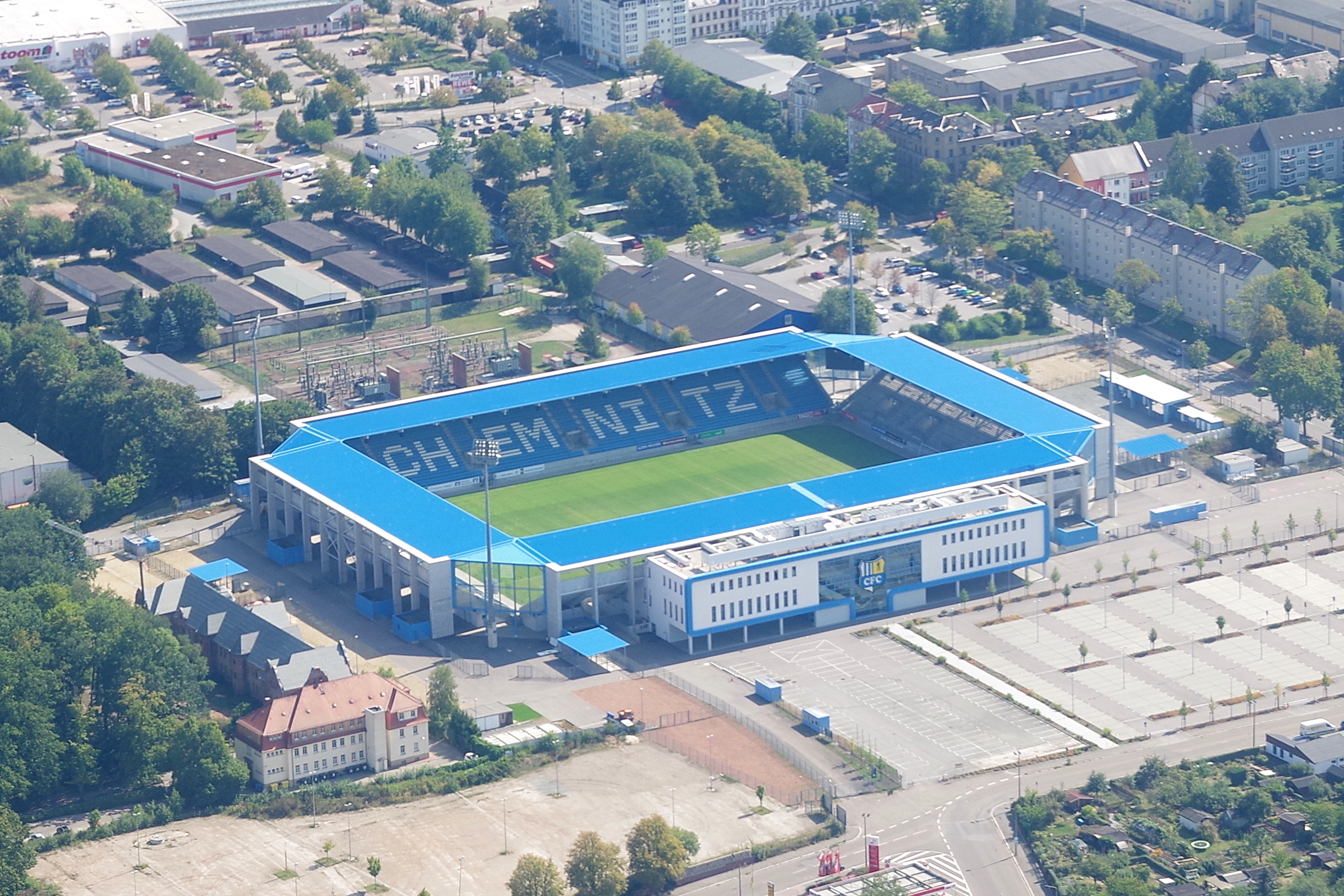
- Interactive map of Stadion Chemnitz
- Full name: Stadion Chemnitz
- Former names: Stadion an der Planitzstraße (1933–1950); Dr.-Kurt-Fischer-Stadion (1950–1990); Stadion an der Gellertstraße (1990–2016) community4you ARENA (2016–2018); Stadion – An der Gellertstraße (from 2018)
- Location: Chemnitz, Germany
- Coordinates: 50°50′31.87″N 12°56′44.41″E
- Capacity: 25,000 (original); 15,000 (current)

Construction
- Opened: 1934

Tenant
- Chemnitzer FC

Stadion an der Gellertstraße is a single-use football stadium in Chemnitz, Germany and the home stadium of Chemnitzer FC. Between 1950 and 1990, the stadium was called "Dr.-Kurt-Fischer-Stadion". The stadium was later nicknamed the "Fischerwiese".

== Structure ==
The stadium has an official capacity of 16,061. The covered Grand Stand (West) has two blocks of seating for 1061 people in total and a standing area for 1036 people. The stadium has a grass pitch, 4 floodlights and a manual scoreboard. After large renovations of the pitch and the entrance gates took place in 2009, the ground now also possesses an undersoil heating and a built-in spray-irrigation system aiming at a reduction of match cancellations due to bad weather conditions. A new main entrance has been built next to the main road passing by the stadium at Heinrich-Schütz-Straße behind blocks 5 and 6 (South). The old main gates were situated behind the Grand Stand (West).

The entrance for away team supporters is located in Forststraße (North-Eastern corner), the guest supporters block 2 has a capacity of 1940 people. In 2009, several new parking lots have been created and existing ones have been enlarged greatly eliminating matchdays' severe parking issues.

== Location ==
Located in the North-East of Chemnitz, the stadium is easy to reach by bus (Line 23 to Stadion Gellertstraße stop or Line 21 to Palmstraße stop). From the main station (Chemnitz Hauptbahnhof), it is about a 15-minute walk. The stadium is located around 5 km away from the A4 Autobahn at exits Chemnitz-Glösa or Chemnitz-Ost.

== History ==
The construction of the stadium began on 31 July 1933 on former horseriding grounds. The finished stadium was inaugurated on 13 May 1934 with a friendly between PSV Chemnitz and SpVgg Greuther Fürth in front of 25,000 spectators. The match finished 5–1 to the home side. Up until the end of World War II, the stadium served as the home stadium for PSV. After the War, SG Chemnitz Nord, precursor to FC Karl-Marx-Stadt, took over the use of stadium. On 13 July 1950, Chemnitz City Council decided to change name the stadium after the communist politician and Interior Minister of Saxony, Kurt Fischer, as he had died shortly before. On 18 November 1953, the record attendance was recorded at a second division match between Chemie Karl-Marx-Stadt and Fortschritt Weißenfels when 27,300 people turned up to see the home side win 3–0.

From the mid-1960s, FC Karl-Marx-Stadt occasionally played their home games in the larger Ernst-Thälmann-Stadion (now the Sportforum). In 1989, the main stand of the Fischer-Stadion was covered which was used for the first time on 22 October of that year in an Oberliga match between FC Karl-Marx Stadt and 1. FC Lokomotive Leipzig.
