= RSSSF =

International organization collecting football stats

- Available in: English
- Creators: Lars Aarhus; Kent Hedlundh; Karel Stokkermans
- Website: rsssf.org
- Launched: January 1994; 32 years ago, as Northern European Rec.Sport.Soccer Statistics Foundation (NERSSSF)
- Current status: Active

The Rec.Sport.Soccer Statistics Foundation (RSSSF) is an international organization dedicated to collecting statistics about football, aiming to build an exhaustive archive of the related information from around the world.

== Website ==
The RSSSF website contains football-related statistics in the form of lists without commentary and it is maintained by volunteer contributors. It is considered one of "the most complete" publicly available statistical football databases in the world, and has extensive information on games and line-ups. According to its founders, this enterprise was created in January 1994 by three regulars of the rec.sport.soccer (RSS) Usenet newsgroup: Lars Aarhus, Kent Hedlundh, and Karel Stokkermans. It was originally known as the "North European Rec.Sport.Soccer Statistics Foundation", but the geographical reference was dropped as its membership from other regions grew.

The RSSSF has members and contributors from all around the world and has spawned seven spin-off projects to more closely follow the leagues of that project's home country. The spin-off projects are dedicated to Albania, Brazil, Denmark, Norway, Romania, Uruguay, Venezuela, and Egypt. In November 2002, the Polish service 90minut.pl became the official branch of RSSSF Poland.

== Player of the Year award ==
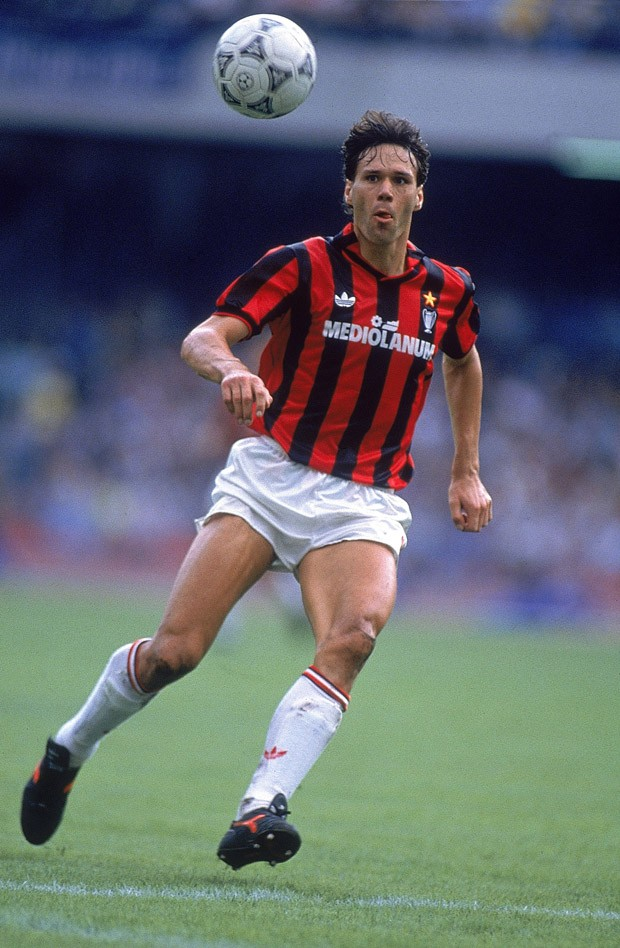
Van Basten was the inaugural winner of the award in 1992.

The Rec.Sport.Soccer Player of the Year Award was an annual football award presented by the organisation. First presented in 1992, the readers of the newsgroup voted in a format similar to that of the France Football's Ballon d'Or award. It recognised the best player in the world and was discontinued after the 2005 edition. Brazil's Ronaldinho was the last ever winner, in 2005.

Award winners
Year	Rank	Player	Team	Votes
1992	1st	(Netherlands) Marco van Basten	(Italy) AC Milan	207
1992	2nd	(Bulgaria) Hristo Stoichkov	(Spain) Barcelona	87
1992	3rd	(Denmark) Peter Schmeichel	(England) Manchester United	62
1993	1st	(Italy) Roberto Baggio	(Italy) Juventus	407
1993	2nd	(Brazil) Romário	(Spain) Barcelona	295
1993	3rd	(Netherlands) Dennis Bergkamp	(Italy) Inter Milan	178
1994	1st	(Brazil) Romário	(Spain) Barcelona	269
1994	2nd	(Bulgaria) Hristo Stoichkov	(Spain) Barcelona	254
1994	3rd	(Italy) Paolo Maldini	(Italy) AC Milan	158
1995	1st	(Liberia) George Weah	(Italy) AC Milan	153
1995	2nd	(Italy) Paolo Maldini	(Italy) AC Milan	102
1995	3rd	(Netherlands) Patrick Kluivert	(Netherlands) Ajax	88
1996	1st	(Brazil) Ronaldo	(Spain) Barcelona	348
1996	2nd	(England) Alan Shearer	(England) Newcastle United	241
1996	3rd	(Germany) Matthias Sammer	(Germany) Borussia Dortmund	215
1997	1st	(Brazil) Ronaldo	(Italy) Inter Milan	276
1997	2nd	(France) Zinedine Zidane	(Italy) Juventus	129
1997	3rd	(Argentina) Gabriel Batistuta	(Italy) Fiorentina	75
1998	1st	(France) Zinedine Zidane	(Italy) Juventus	335
1998	2nd	(Argentina) Gabriel Batistuta	(Italy) Fiorentina	175
1998	3rd	(France) Lilian Thuram	(Italy) Parma	136
1999	1st	(Brazil) Rivaldo	(Spain) Barcelona	536
1999	2nd	(England) David Beckham	(England) Manchester United	313
1999	3rd	(Ukraine) Andriy Shevchenko	(Italy) AC Milan	186
2000	1st	(Portugal) Luís Figo	(Spain) Real Madrid	648
2000	2nd	(France) Zinedine Zidane	(Italy) Juventus	535
2000	3rd	(Brazil) Rivaldo	(Spain) Barcelona	272
2001	1st	(England) Michael Owen	(England) Liverpool	288
2001	2nd	(Portugal) Luís Figo	(Spain) Real Madrid	234
2001	3rd	(Spain) Raúl	(Spain) Real Madrid	216
2002	1st	(Brazil) Ronaldo	(Spain) Real Madrid	447
2002	2nd	(Brazil) Roberto Carlos	(Spain) Real Madrid	371
2002	3rd	(France) Zinedine Zidane	(Spain) Real Madrid	341
2003	1st	(Czech Republic) Pavel Nedvěd	(Italy) Juventus	818
2003	2nd	(France) Thierry Henry	(England) Arsenal	540
2003	3rd	(France) Zinedine Zidane	(Spain) Real Madrid	350
2004	1st	(Brazil) Ronaldinho	(Spain) Barcelona	437
2004	2nd	(Ukraine) Andriy Shevchenko	(Italy) AC Milan	329
2004	3rd	(Portugal) Deco	(Spain) Barcelona	297
2005	1st	(Brazil) Ronaldinho	(Spain) Barcelona	482
2005	2nd	(England) Frank Lampard	(England) Chelsea	281
2005	3rd	(England) Steven Gerrard	(England) Liverpool	191

Wins by player
Player	Winner	Second place	Third place
(Brazil) Ronaldo	3 (1996, 1997, 2002)	—	—
(Brazil) Ronaldinho	2 (2004, 2005)	—	—
(France) Zinedine Zidane	1 (1998)	2 (1997, 2000)	2 (2002, 2003)
(Brazil) Romário	1 (1994)	1 (1993)	—
(Portugal) Luís Figo	1 (2000)	1 (2001)	—
(Brazil) Rivaldo	1 (1999)	—	1 (2000)
(Netherlands) Marco van Basten	1 (1992)	—	—
(Italy) Roberto Baggio	1 (1993)	—	—
(Liberia) George Weah	1 (1995)	—	—
(England) Michael Owen	1 (2001)	—	—
(Czech Republic) Pavel Nedvěd	1 (2003)	—	—

Wins by nationality
Nationality	Players	Wins
Brazil	4	7
France	1	1
England	1	1
Portugal	1	1
Italy	1	1
Netherlands	1	1
Liberia	1	1
Czech Republic	1	1

Wins by club
Club	Players	Wins
(Spain) Barcelona	4	5
(Italy) Juventus	3	3
(Spain) Real Madrid	2	2
(Italy) AC Milan	2	2
(Italy) Inter Milan	1	1
(England) Liverpool	1	1

== Most Prolific Goalscorers (Top 10) ==
As of 3 August 2026.
Bold indicates players currently active.
+ indicates player may have scored and played more.

The RSSSF compiles its list using a four-table method that separates official matches from all matches and top-level matches from all matches at top level; official matches comprise first-class senior club and international fixtures, the all-matches tables also include friendlies, exhibition games, and other non-official matches, and the top-level tables are restricted to the highest national league and international matches against top-level opposition.

=== Official Matches – Top level ===
Rank	Player	Goals	Career span
1	(Portugal) **Cristiano Ronaldo**	978	2002–present
2	(Argentina) **Lionel Messi**	921	2003–present
3	(Brazil) Pelé	770	1956–1977
4	(Brazil) Romário	761	1984–2009
5	(Hungary) Ferenc Puskás	760	1943–1967
6	(Austria) (Czechoslovakia) Josef Bican	743	1930–1957
7	(Poland) **Robert Lewandowski**	697	2004–present
8	(Northern Ireland) Jimmy Jones	659	1943–1965
9	(Netherlands) Abe Lenstra	645	1936–1964
10	(Germany) Gerd Müller	640	1963–1981

=== All Matches – Top level ===
Rank	Player	Official goals (top level)	International friendlies	National friendlies vs top-league teams and tournaments	Total	Career span
1	(Brazil) Pelé	770	396	108	1,274	1956–1977
2	(Austria) (Czechoslovakia) Josef Bican	743	195	143	1,081	1930–1957
3	(Portugal) **Cristiano Ronaldo**	978	44	3	1,025	2002–present
4	(Hungary) Ferenc Puskás	761	179	71	1,011	1943–1967

RSSSF currently lists only four players in this table.

=== Official Matches ===
Rank	Player	Goals	Matches	Ratio	Career span
1	(Portugal) **Cristiano Ronaldo**	994	1,366	0.73	2002–present
2	(Germany) Erwin Helmchen	989+	582	1.70	1924–1951
3	(Austria) (Czechoslovakia) Josef Bican	950+	624	1.52	1930–1957
4	(Argentina) **Lionel Messi**	948	1,220	0.78	2003–present
5	(England) Ronnie Rooke	940+	1,035	0.91	1929–1961
6	(Northern Ireland) Jimmy Jones	840+	760	1.11	1943–1965
7	(Hungary) Ferenc Puskás	802	792	1.01	1943–1967
8	(Hungary) Ferenc Deák	795+	515	1.54	1939–1959
9	(Netherlands) Abe Lenstra	790+	850	0.93	1936–1964
10	(Brazil) Romário	785	1,003	0.78	1984–2009

=== All Matches ===
Rank	Player	Goals	Matches	Ratio	Career span
1	(Hungary) Lajos Tichy	1,917	1,307	1.47	1952–1971
2	(Austria) (Czechoslovakia) Josef Bican	1,813+	1,089	1.66	1930–1957
3	(Germany) Erwin Helmchen	1,611+	939	1.72	1924–1951
4	(Hungary) Ferenc Puskás	1,569+	1,270	1.24	1943–1967
5	(Germany) Gerd Müller	1,483	1,228	1.21	1963–1981
6	(Hungary) Ferenc Bene	1,424+	1,481	0.96	1959–1985
7	(Hungary) Ferenc Deák	1,374+	839	1.64	1939–1959
8	(Brazil) Pelé	1,324	1,413	0.94	1956–1977
9	(Hungary) József Takács	1,218+	943	1.29	1920–1940
10	(Austria) Franz Binder	1,202+	833	1.44	1927–1949

== See also ==
- Association of Football Statisticians
- IFFHS
