= BSV Cottbus-Ost =

German association football club from Cottbus, Brandenburg

- Full name: Brandenburger Sportverein Cottbus-Ost
- Founded: 1899; 127 years ago
- Ground: Stadion am Stadtring
- Capacity: 4,000
- Chairman: Thomas Conrad
- League: Brandenburg 1. Kreisklasse Niederlausitz Nord
Home colours	Away colours

BSV Cottbus-Ost (German: Brandenburger Sportverein Cottbus-Ost) is a German sports club in Brandenburg, Germany. The club was founded in 1899 and sees itself as the legal successor to FV Brandenburg 1899 Sandow and BSG Fortschritt Cottbus. The club competes in the Brandenburg State Football Association in the 1. Kreisklasse Niederlausitz.

== History ==
The club was founded in 1899 as FV Brandenburg 1899 Sandow and soon changed their name to FV Brandenburg 1899 Cottbuss. They were one of the founding members of the Verband Niederlausitzer Ballspiel-Vereine (VNBV). The league closed in 1906 and the club moved to the South Eastern German football championship. The club won the Lower Lusatian Football Championship and became eligible to compete for a qualifier in the 1906 German football championship, but lost to SC Schlesien Breslau 3–1. The club again won the Lower Lusatian Football Championship in 1927 (with the help of Erwin Helmchen) and 1928, gaining entry into the South Eastern German football championship.

In 1945, FV Brandenburg was dissolved and became SG Cottbus-Ost. As SG-Cottbus-Ost, the team became the Brandenburgischer Fußballmeister/Brandenburg football champions in 1947 and 1948. Their 1948 victory helped them gain qualifications to the 1948 Ostzonenmeisterschaft, where they lost in the quarterfinals to SG Weimer-Ost. The club missed a chance to qualify for the DDR-Oberliga in 1950 and ended up in the newly created DDR-Liga. The club was renamed ZSG Textill Cottbus in 1951 and then BSG Fortschritt Cottbus in 1952. The club often struggled financially and mostly stayed in the 3rd and 4th divisions of the Bezirksliga, while rivals ASG Vorwärts Cottbus, FSV Cottbus 99 and FC Energie Cottbus had passed them by.

After German reunification, the club's had reached the Landesliga Brandenburg but are currently in the Brandenburg State Football Association's 1. Kreisklasse Niederlausit Nord.

== Honors ==
- Niederlausitzer Fußballmeisterschaft

Champions: 1906, 1908, 1927 and 1928 (as FV Brandenburg Cottbus)

- Brandenburgischer Fußballmeister

Champions: 1947 and 1948 (as SG Cottbus-Ost)

- Ostzonenmeisterschaftr

Champions: 1948

- Teilnahme DDR-Liga

Champions: 1951 and 1952

== Notable personnel ==
Erwin Helmchen – He played for the club from 1923 to 1928. He would later become the top goal scorer in the history of football, until Cristiano Ronaldo surpass him in 2026.

Rainer Pietsch – He debuted for the club at age 16 and played for the club between 1973 and 1977 and later in 1985. He played for first division FC Vorwärts Frankfurt from 1976 to 1984.

Bernd Mudra – He debuted for the club in 1970 and had three stints with the club from 1970 to 1986 and played for FC Vorwärts Frankfurt from 1977 to 1979.

Erich Luedecke – He debuted for the club in 1945 and would later go on to coach for the club as well.

Johannes Schöne – He played for the club from 1946 to 1950 and once held the record for the most goals scored in a season in the DDR-Oberliga at 38.

Karl Heinz Wohlfahrt – He played for the club from 1947 to 1950 and later from 1956 to 1958. He played for the East Germany national football team and notably played in their first ever game as a team.
