= 1936 Tschammerpokal =

Tournament details
- Country: Germany
- Teams: 64

Final positions
- Champions: VfB Leipzig (1st title)
- Runners-up: Schalke 04

Tournament statistics
- Matches played: 69

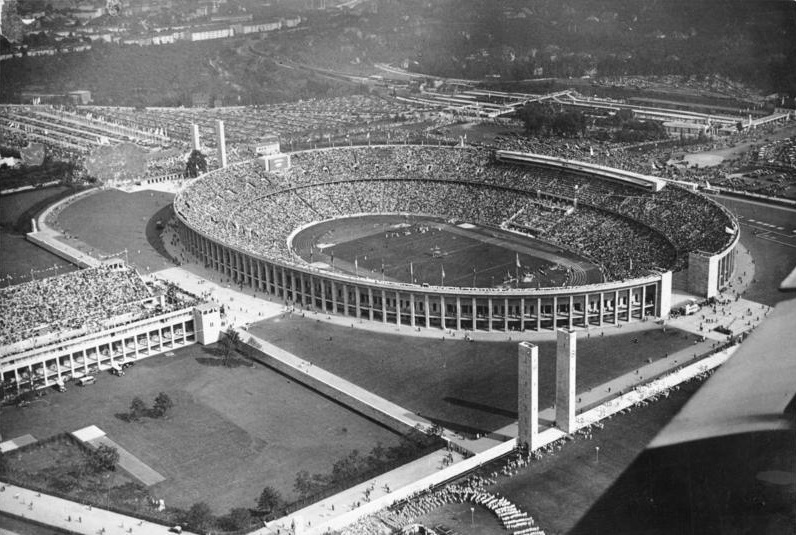
Olympiastadion, Berlin

The 1936 Tschammerpokal was the 2nd season of the annual German football cup competition. A total of 5,291 teams competed in the qualifying tournament which was divided into four stages. The final stage ended with the final which was held on 3 January 1937 in the Olympiastadion in Berlin. VfB Leipzig defeated last year's runner up, Schalke 04, 2–1.

== Matches ==
=== First round ===
7 June 1936
SV Algermissen	1 – 4	SV Werder Bremen
VfB Peine	2 – 0	Hannover 96
11 June 1936
Westmark 05 Trier	3 – 1	FV Saarbrücken
Kölner CfR	0 – 0	SSV Vingst 05	(AET)
13 June 1936
Wacker Marktredwitz	0 – 1	VfB Stuttgart
Viktoria 89 Berlin	2 – 1	Wacker Leipzig
Sportvg Feuerbach	5 – 2	Karlsruher FC Phönix
14 June 1936
1. FC Pforzheim	7 – 0	FK Pirmasens
1. FC Schweinfurt 05	4 – 0	FC Hanau 93
BC Hartha	8 – 0	Wacker Halle
Cherusker Görlitz	1 – 2	Berliner SV 92
CSC 03 Kassel	1 – 2	Polizei Chemnitz
FC Altona 93	3 – 5	Wacker 04 Berlin
FC Bayern Munich	3 – 4	1. SSV Ulm 1928
Freiburger FC	2 – 0	Kickers Offenbach
Hertha BSC	3 – 2	Eimsbütteler TV
Holstein Kiel	1 – 2	SV Polizei Lübeck	(AET)
VfB Preußen Langenbielau	2 – 7	Vorwärts-Rasensport Gleiwitz
SpVgg Röhlinghausen	2 – 1	Arminia Bielefeld
Stuttgarter Kickers	0 – 1	TSV 1860 München
Beuthener SuSV 09	3 – 2	Minerva 93 Berlin
VfB Leipzig	5 – 0	1. SV Jena
VfL Benrath	2 – 0	Rheydter SV
VfvB Ruhrort	2 – 5	FC Schalke 04
SC Victoria Hamburg	6 – 1	SV Dessau 05
Rot-Weiß Oberhausen	7 – 0	SV ASA Atsch
SV Flörsheim	0 – 1	SV Waldhof Mannheim
21 June 1936
MSV von der Goltz Tilsit	0 – 2	SV Hindenburg Allenstein
Viktoria Stolp	6 – 0	Preußen Danzig
Wormatia Worms	3 – 2	VfB Friedberg	(AET)
16 August 1936
SpVgg 08 Klafeld-Geisweid	2 – 1	Fortuna Düsseldorf
1. FC Nürnberg	7 – 0	Planitzer SC

==== Replay ====
21 June 1936
SSV Vingst 05	8 – 3	Kölner CfR

=== Second round ===
21 June 1936
Westmark 05 Trier	0 – 1	VfB Stuttgart
27 June 1936
TSV 1860 München	3 – 3	1. FC Pforzheim	(AET)
28 June 1936
1. FC Schweinfurt 05	5 – 2	Sportvg Feuerbach
Berliner SV 92	4 – 1	SuSV Beuthen 1909
FC Schalke 04	2 – 0	SpVgg Röhlinghausen
Polizei Chemnitz	5 – 2	Viktoria 89 Berlin
1. SSV Ulm 1928	3 – 0	Freiburger FC
SV Hindenburg Allenstein	2 – 1	Viktoria Stolp
SV Polizei Lübeck	1 – 3	Hertha BSC
VfB Peine	1 – 0	BC Hartha
Vorwärts-Rasensport Gleiwitz	2 – 2	VfB Leipzig	(AET)
Wacker 04 Berlin	5 – 4	Victoria Hamburg
SV Werder Bremen	3 – 2	Rot-Weiß Oberhausen	(AET)
Wormatia Worms	11 – 1	SSV Vingst 05
23 August 1936
VfL Benrath	3 – 2	1. FC Nürnberg
SV Waldhof Mannheim	6 – 0	SpVgg 08 Klafeld-Geisweid

==== Replays ====
16 August 1936
1. FC Pforzheim	2 – 0	1860 Munich
23 August 1936
VfB Leipzig	3 – 0	Vorwärts Rasensport Gleiwitz

=== Round of 16 ===
6 September 1936
VfB Stuttgart	0 – 0	FC Schalke 04
SV Werder Bremen	3 – 1	Wacker 04 Berlin
1. FC Schweinfurt 05	4 – 2	TSG Ulm 1846
SV Waldhof Mannheim	1 – 0	PSV Chemnitz
VfR Wormatia Worms	2 – 1	1. FC Pforzheim
Hertha BSC	1 – 1	VfL Benrath
VfB Peine	3 – 1	SV Hindenburg Allenstein
VfB Leipzig	2 – 0	Berliner SV 92

==== Replays ====
20 September 1936
FC Schalke 04	6 – 0	VfB Stuttgart
VfL Benrath	8 – 2	Hertha BSC

=== Quarter-finals ===
1 October 1936
FC Schalke 04	5 – 2	SV Werder Bremen	(AET)
1. FC Schweinfurt 05	2 – 1	SV Waldhof Mannheim
VfR Wormatia Worms	3 – 3	VfL Benrath	(AET)
VfB Leipzig	4 – 2	VfB Peine

==== Replay ====
2 October 1936
VfL Benrath	2 – 3	VfR Wormatia Worms	(AET)

=== Semi-finals ===
8 November 1936
FC Schalke 04	3 – 2	1. FC Schweinfurt 05
22 November 1936
VfB Leipzig	5 – 1	VfR Wormatia Worms

=== Final ===
3 January 1937

VfB Leipzig	2–1	Schalke 04
May 21'; Gabriel 32'	Report	Kalwitzki 42'

Olympiastadion, Berlin
Attendance: 70,000
Referee: Egon Zacher (Berlin)
