= 1936 German football championship =

1936 German championship
Deutsche Fußballmeisterschaft
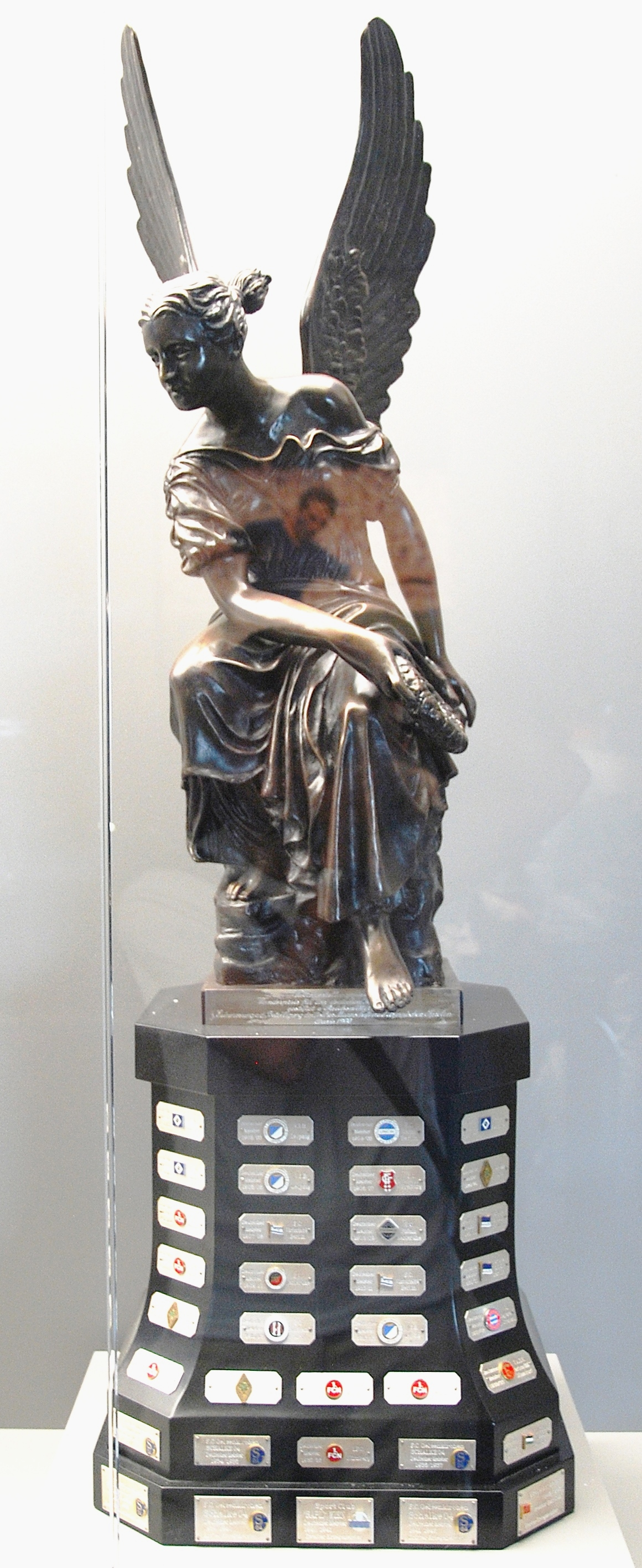
- Replica of the Viktoria trophy

Tournament details
- Country: Germany
- Dates: 5 April – 21 June
- Teams: 16

Final positions
- Champions: 1. FC Nürnberg; 6th German title
- Runners-up: Fortuna Düsseldorf
- Third place: Schalke 04
- Fourth place: Vorwärts-Rasensport Gleiwitz

Tournament statistics
- Matches played: 52
- Goals scored: 211 (4.06 per match)
- Top goal scorer: Erwin Helmchen (10 goals)

The 1936 German football championship, the 29th edition of the competition, was won by 1. FC Nürnberg by defeating Fortuna Düsseldorf 2–1 after extra time in the final. It was Nuremberg's sixth championship and its first since 1927. Fortuna Düsseldorf made its second final appearance, having previously won the competition in 1933 but, after 1936, the team would never appear in the final again. Nuremberg had eliminated the champions of the previous two seasons, Schalke 04 in the semi-finals, making 1936 the only final from 1933 to 1942 not to include the club. Schalke however would return to its winning ways the following season when it defeated Nuremberg in the 1937 final.

PSV Chemnitz's Erwin Helmchen was the top scorer of the 1936 championship with ten goals.

It was the last German championship final in Berlin to be played at a venue other than the Olympiastadion, the latter having been built for the 1936 Summer Olympics and being used for all finals from 1937 to 1944 and six more after the Second World War.

The sixteen 1935–36 Gauliga champions competed in a group stage of four groups of four teams each, with the group winners advancing to the semi-finals. The two semi-final winners then contested the 1936 championship final. The 1936 season saw the introduction of a game for third place, played between the two losing semi-finalists.

== Qualified teams ==
The teams qualified through the 1935–36 Gauliga season:

Club	Qualified from
SV Waldhof Mannheim	Gauliga Baden
1. FC Nürnberg	Gauliga Bayern
Hertha BSC	Gauliga Berlin-Brandenburg
FC Hanau 93	Gauliga Hessen
SV Jena	Gauliga Mitte
CfR Köln	Gauliga Mittelrhein
Fortuna Düsseldorf	Gauliga Niederrhein
SV Werder Bremen	Gauliga Niedersachsen
Eimsbütteler TV	Gauliga Nordmark
Hindenburg Allenstein	Gauliga Ostpreußen
Viktoria Stolp	Gauliga Pommern
PSV Chemnitz	Gauliga Sachsen
Vorwärts-Rasensport Gleiwitz	Gauliga Schlesien
Wormatia Worms	Gauliga Südwest
Schalke 04	Gauliga Westfalen
Stuttgarter Kickers	Gauliga Württemberg

== Competition ==
=== Group 1 ===
Group 1 was contested by the champions of the Gauligas Brandenburg, Ostpreußen, Sachsen and Westfalen:

Pos	Team	Pld	W	D	L	GF	GA	GR	Pts	Qualification	S04	PSV	BSV	HIA
1	Schalke 04	6	5	0	1	22	7	3.143	10	Advance to semi-finals	—	2–3	4–0	7–0
2	PSV Chemnitz	6	5	0	1	19	9	2.111	10		1–2	—	4–1	4–1
3	Berliner SV	6	2	0	4	10	17	0.588	4		2–3	1–4	—	3–1
4	Hindenburg Allenstein	6	0	0	6	6	24	0.250	0		1–4	2–3	1–3	—

Source: RSSSF
Rules for classification: 1) Points; 2) Goal ratio.

=== Group 2 ===
Group 2 was contested by the champions of the Gauligas Nordmark, Niedersachsen, Pommern and Schlesien:

Pos	Team	Pld	W	D	L	GF	GA	GR	Pts	Qualification	VRG	SVW	ETV	STO
1	Vorwärts-Rasensport Gleiwitz	6	5	0	1	21	9	2.333	10	Advance to semi-finals	—	5–2	4–1	5–0
2	Werder Bremen	6	4	0	2	22	11	2.000	8		2–4	—	2–0	6–0
3	Eimsbütteler TV	6	2	0	4	7	14	0.500	4		3–0	1–6	—	2–1
4	Viktoria Stolp	6	1	0	5	4	20	0.200	2		1–3	1–4	1–0	—

Source: RSSSF
Rules for classification: 1) Points; 2) Goal ratio.

=== Group 3 ===
Group 3 was contested by the champions of the Gauligas Bayern, Mitte, Südwest and Württemberg:

Pos	Team	Pld	W	D	L	GF	GA	GR	Pts	Qualification	FCN	W08	SVJ	SKI
1	1. FC Nürnberg	6	5	1	0	19	4	4.750	11	Advance to semi-finals	—	2–1	3–0	2–0
2	Wormatia Worms	6	2	1	3	15	13	1.154	5		2–2	—	3–1	6–2
3	1. SV Jena	6	2	0	4	7	13	0.538	4		1–5	3–1	—	2–0
4	Stuttgarter Kickers	6	2	0	4	6	17	0.353	4		0–5	3–2	1–0	—

Source: RSSSF
Rules for classification: 1) Points; 2) Goal ratio.

=== Group 4 ===
Group 4 was contested by the champions of the Gauligas Baden, Hessen, Mittelrhein and Niederrhein:

Pos	Team	Pld	W	D	L	GF	GA	GR	Pts	Qualification	F95	H93	WMA	CFR
1	Fortuna Düsseldorf	6	5	0	1	16	7	2.286	10	Advance to semi-finals	—	3–1	3–1	3–0
2	FC Hanau 93	6	2	1	3	9	6	1.500	5		5–1	—	0–0	3–0
3	Waldhof Mannheim	6	2	1	3	6	10	0.600	5		0–4	1–0	—	2–0
4	Kölner CfR	6	2	0	4	4	12	0.333	4		0–2	1–0	3–2	—

Source: RSSSF
Rules for classification: 1) Points; 2) Goal ratio.

=== Semi-finals ===
Team 1	Score	Team 2
7 June 1936
Fortuna Düsseldorf	3–1	Vorwärts-Rasensport Gleiwitz
1. FC Nürnberg	2–0	Schalke 04

=== Third place play-off ===
Team 1	Score	Team 2
20 June 1936
Schalke 04	8–1	Vorwärts-Rasensport Gleiwitz

=== Final ===
Team 1	Score	Team 2
21 June 1936
1. FC Nürnberg	2–1 aet	Fortuna Düsseldorf
