= Péter Szabó =

Hungarian footballer and manager

Personal information
- Full name: Péter Szabó
- Date of birth: 13 April 1899
- Place of birth: Budapest, Austro-Hungary
- Date of death: 21 September 1963 (aged 64)
- Place of death: Frankfurt, West Germany
- Position: Midfielder

Senior career*
Years	Team	Apps	(Gls)
1915–1919	MTK Budapest		
1919	Wiener AF	1	(0)
1919–1920	1. FC Nürnberg		
1920–1923	Eintracht Frankfurt		
1923–1926	FC Wacker München		
1926–1927	Chemnitzer BC		
1927–1928	Planitzer SC		
1939	Ruch Chorzów		

International career
1916–1919	Hungary	12	(0)

Managerial career
- VfB Dillingen
- Rot-Weiß Frankfurt
- 1938: Galatasaray
- 1939–1941: Eintracht Frankfurt
- 1942–1943: Eintracht Frankfurt
- FSV Frankfurt
- Ulmer FV 94
- Teutonia München
- BV Osterfeld
- 1945–1946: Pécsi VSK
- 1946–1949: Dorogi AC
- 1948–1949: MATEOSZ
- 1949–1950: BKV Előre SC
- 1950: Vasas
- 1954–1955: Dorogi Bányász
- 1956: Haladás Szombathely
- 1958–1959: 1. FC Köln
- * Club domestic league appearances and goals

Péter Szabó (13 April 1899 – 21 September 1963) was a Hungarian football manager and player.

== Club career ==
Born in Budapest, Szabó played with MTK Budapest FC where he won three consecutive championships. In 1919 he moves abroad and joins Austrian side Wiener AF, but after making only one appearance in the 1919–20 Austrian football championship he, along his former MTK and national team teammate Alfréd Schaffer sign with German side 1. FC Nürnberg. Szabó played a total of 43 games for Nurnberg and won the 1920 German football championship. Next he played three seasons with Eintracht Frankfurt. He also played with German sides FC Wacker München, Chemnitzer BC, Planitzer SC and Polish side Ruch Chorzów.

== International career ==
Péter Szabó made 12 appearances for the Hungary national team between 1916 and 1919.

== Coaching career ==
Peter Szabó had a long coaching career that includes clubs from Turkey, Germany and Hungary.

== Honours ==
MTK Budapest

- Nemzeti Bajnokság I
  - Champion: 1916–17, 1917–18, 1918–19

1. FC Nürnberg

- German Championship
  - Champion: 1920
- Southern German championship
  - Champion: 1920
- Kreisliga Nordbayern
  - Champion: 1920

Eintracht Frankfurt

- Kreisliga Nordmain
  - Champion: 1920–21
  - Runner-up: 1921–22

Chemnitzer BC

- Mitteldeutscher Pokal
  - Winner: 1927

1. FC Köln

- Oberliga West
  - Runner-up: 1958–59

== Sources ==
- Matheja, Ulrich (2011). Unsere Eintracht - Eintracht Frankfurt - Die Chronik. Die Werkstatt. ISBN 978-3-89533-750-5.
- Péter Szabó at eintracht-archiv.de
