= Anton Unseld =

German footballer and manager

Personal information
- Date of birth: 4 July 1894
- Place of birth: Ulm, Baden-Württemberg, Germany
- Date of death: 4 December 1932 (aged 38)
- Position: Defender

Senior career*
Years	Team	Apps	(Gls)
1911–15	Ulmer FV 1894		
1915–25	Stuttgarter Kickers		

Managerial career
- 1926–27: Stuttgarter Kickers
- 1928–32: FV Saarbrücken
- * Club domestic league appearances and goals

Anton "Toni" Unseld (4 July 1894 – 6 December 1932) was a German footballer and later manager. He played primarily as a defender.
