= TuRa Leipzig =

German football club

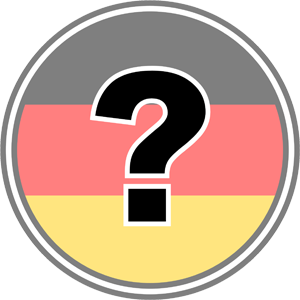
- Full name: Turn- und Rasensportverein Leipzig von 1899 e.V.
- Founded: 1899; 126 years ago
- Dissolved: 1945; 80 years ago
Home colours	Away colours

TuRa Leipzig was a German association football club active before World War II from the city of Leipzig, Saxony. Successor sides included BSG Chemie Leipzig, which was part of East German football competition, and FC Sachsen Leipzig, which emerged following German reunification in 1990.

== History ==
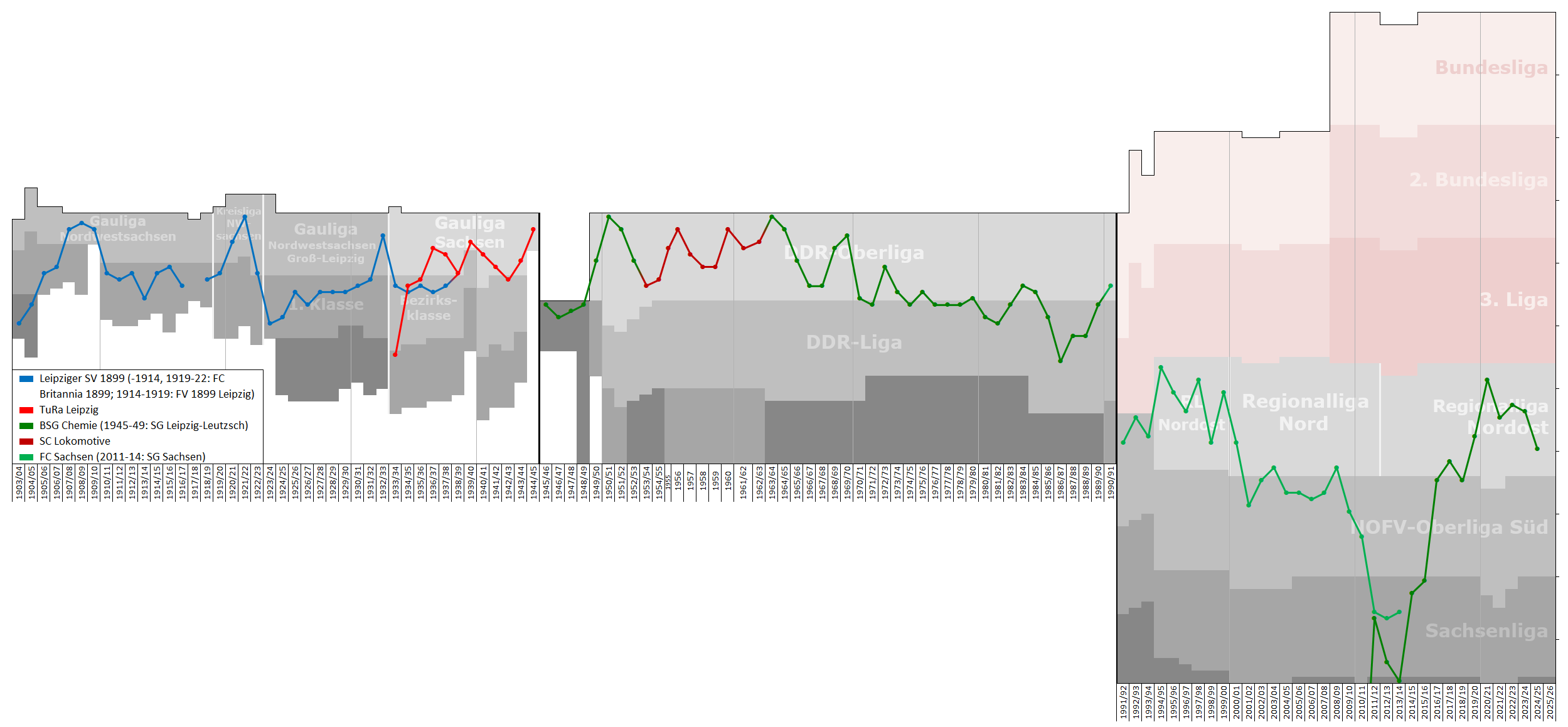
Historical chart of the club and its successors' league performance

The club was established in 1932 as Sportverein für Turnen und Rasenspiel Leipzig and advanced out of local play in 1936 to join the Gauliga Sachsen, one of 16 top-flight regional leagues established under the Third Reich. In November 1938, TuRa 32 was joined by Leipziger Sportverein 1899 which was the product of the 1919 union of FC Britannia 1899 Leipzig, established on 30 August 1899, and FC Hertha 1905 Leipzig, established 13 March 1905 as FC Hohenzollern Leipzig. TuRa 1899 Leipzig continued to play in the Gauliga Sachsen through to the end of the 1941–42 campaign when they were relegated. The team made a single appearance in 1940 in play for the Tschammerpokal, predecessor to the modern-day DFB-Pokal (German Cup). They returned to first division play after a single season absence before being paired with SpVgg Leipzig to form the wartime side Kriegspielgemeinschaft Leipzig. The 1944–45 season ended prematurely as World War II overtook the country and the team was lost at war's end.

Organizations throughout the country, including sports and football clubs, were disbanded after the conflict as part of the process of denazification. New clubs soon emerged from the remnants of the pre-war associations and former TuRa members established SG Leutzsch, named for the club's home district, in 1945. In early 1949, SG and a number of other clubs including SG Lindenau-Hafen (out of the former membership of SpVgg Leipzig ), SG Lindenau-Aue, SG Leipzig-Mitte, and SG Böhlitz-Ehrenberg were merged to create Zentral Sportgemeinschaft Industrie Leipzig which later in the year became ZSG Industrie Leutsch before disappearing in another merger of several city sides.
