= Sportforum Chemnitz =

Sports venue in Chemnitz, Germany

Coordinates: 50°48′21″N 12°56′5″E

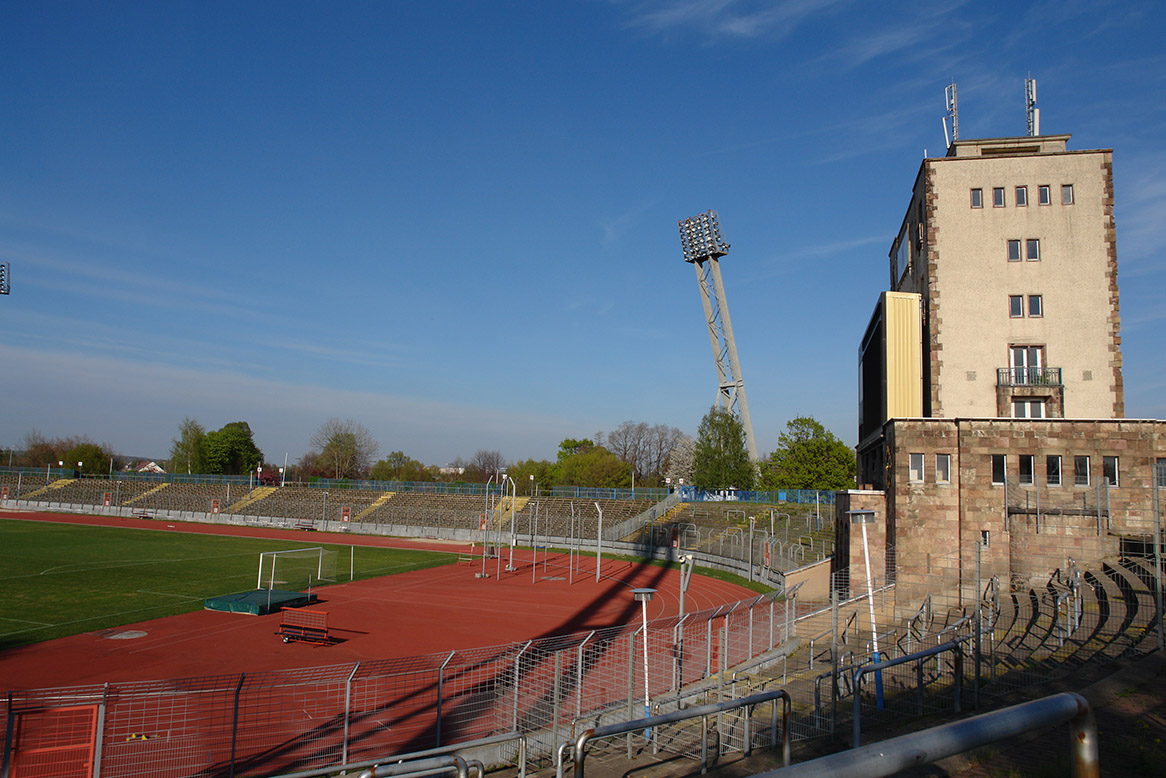
- Interactive map of Sportforum Chemnitz
- Full name: Sportforum Chemnitz
- Former names: Südkampfbahn (1933-1938); Großkampfbahn (1938-1945); Ernst-Thälmann-Stadion (1945-1992)
- Location: Chemnitz, Germany
- Capacity: 60,000 (record); 18,500 (current)

Construction
- Opened: July 11, 1926; 100 years ago

Tenant
- Chemnitzer BC

Sportforum Chemnitz is a multi-purpose stadium, in Chemnitz, Germany. The capacity of the stadium is 18,500 spectators. It was used as the stadium of Chemnitzer BC and later for home matches of FC Karl-Marx-Stadt.

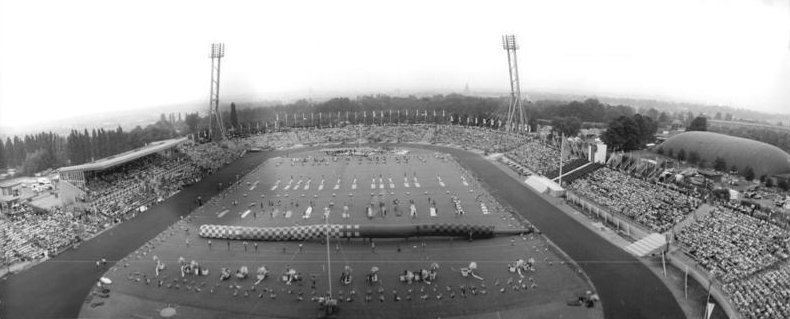

(Ernst Thälmann Pioneer Organisation, 1988)
