= Paul Imke =

German footballer

Personal information
- Date of birth: 8 March 1892
- Place of birth: Weißenfels, German Empire
- Date of death: 3 April 1964 (aged 72)
- Place of death: West Germany
- Position: Inside forward

Youth career
- SC Weißenfels

Senior career*
Years	Team	Apps	(Gls)
- SC Weißenfels
1908–?	Preußen Weißenfels		
- Leipziger BC
1913–191?	Hannovera Hannover / Hannover 96		
1919–1922	Frankfurter FV / Eintracht Frankfurt	28+	(17+)
1924–1925	Eintracht Frankfurt	3	(2)
- * Club domestic league appearances and goals

Paul Imke (8 March 1892 – 3 April 1964) was a German footballer. He played club football with Leipziger BC, Hannover 96 and Eintracht Frankfurt.

Paul Imke debuted in the first team of his hometown club SC Weißenfels aged 14. In 1908 he moved to local rivals Preußen Weißenfels. For professional reasons he moved to Leipzig where he played for Leipziger BC and later to BV Hannovera 1898 which later were part of a merger that saw the formation of Hannover 96. In Hannover he scored plenty of goals that led to call ups to North German selections. In 1919 his profession moved him to Frankfurt where he worked for the publishing house Tischbein where he was in charge for distribution and advertisement acquisitions. In Frankfurt he joined Frankfurter FV that soon became Eintracht Frankfurt. In 1922 he finished his active career but soon revived his playing career when the Riederwald based club was in relegation trouble. Two goals against Helvetia Bockenheim in 2-1 victory secured the stay in the league. For this service he was appointed as honorary club member and honorary captain for Eintracht Frankfurt.

Paul Imke was the publisher of the Eintracht club magazine and therefore nicknamed Annoncen-Imke (Advertisement Imke). His intermediations between sports and the business world brought many sports events to Frankfurt.

== Honours ==
- Kreisliga Nordmain
  - Champion: 1919–20, 1920–21
  - Runner-up: 1921–22

== Sources ==
- Matheja, Ulrich (2011). Unsere Eintracht - Eintracht Frankfurt - Die Chronik. Die Werkstatt. ISBN 978-3-89533-750-5.
- Matheja, Ulrich (2007). Schlappekicker und Himmelsstürmer. Die Geschichte von Eintracht Frankfurt. Die Werkstatt. ISBN 978-3-89533-538-9.
