= Adolf Höschle =

German footballer and manager

Personal information
- Date of birth: 20 July 1899
- Place of birth: Stuttgart, Germany
- Date of death: 14 December 1969 (aged 70)
- Position: Defender

Senior career*
Years	Team	Apps	(Gls)
- Stuttgarter Kickers

International career
1920	Germany	1	(0)

Managerial career
- 1933–34: Stuttgarter Kickers
- * Club domestic league appearances and goals

Adolf Höschle (20 July 1899 – 14 December 1969) was a German international footballer and manager.
