= Viktor Weißenbacher =

German footballer

Personal information
- Date of birth: 15 July 1897
- Date of death: 18 December 1956 (aged 59)
- Position: Forward

Senior career*
Years	Team	Apps	(Gls)
- 1. FC Pforzheim

International career
1922	Germany	1	(1)
- * Club domestic league appearances and goals

Viktor Weißenbacher (15 July 1897 – 18 December 1956) was a German international footballer.
