= Leipziger BC 1893 =

German football club

Leipziger Ballspiel-Club was a German association football club from Leipzig, Saxony.

== History ==
Leipziger BC was founded on 6 March 1893 at the Keglerheim on Nordstraße as a football and cricket club at the initiative of three Englishmen. In 1900, the club was involved in the founding of the German Football Association (DFB) in Leipzig. The DFB was founded on 28 January 1900 at the Mariengarten restaurant by representatives of 86 clubs. Oskar Büttner of Leipziger BC served on the DFB's first eleven-member committee.

Before this, LBC had played a prominent role in the formation of the Verband Leipziger Ballspiel-Vereine in 1896, with Büttner serving as the city league's first president. The league was associated with the larger regional Verband Mitteldeutscher Ballspiel-Vereine.

The team played at Sportplatz Leipzig, wearing vertically striped white-and-yellow shirts with dark-blue shorts. It generally recorded lower-to-mid-table finishes. In 1907–08, LBC reached the city final, where it lost 1–6 to VfB Leipzig. VfB Leipzig records its first match as a 3–1 victory over LBC on 5 July 1896.

After a long series of poor finishes, LBC dropped into the lower divisions during the mid-1920s. The club disappeared towards the end of the Second World War.

The association also had a tennis section.
