= Deutsches Sportecho =

East German sports newspaper (1947–1991)

- Type: Daily sports newspaper
- Publisher: Sportverlag (de)
- Founded: 1947
- Ceased publication: 1991
- Language: German
- Headquarters: East Berlin
- Circulation: 185,000 (pre-German reunification)
- ISSN: 0323-8628

Deutsches Sportecho was an East German daily sports newspaper of the Deutscher Turn- und Sportbund (DTSB).

== History ==
Deutsches Sportecho was first published on 5 May 1947. The paper had a circulation of 185,000 copies. The paper sponsored the association football competition DFV-Supercup (Pokal des Deutschen Sportechos) in 1989. The paper was published by the East German publishing house Sportverlag at the Neustädtische Kirchstraße 15 in Berlin. Sportverlag also published the weekly football paper Die neue Fußballwoche (FuWo) of the East German Football Association (DFV).

The paper was acquired by West German publishing group Axel Springer in 1990. The paper would now be published by Sportverlag GmbH. The circulation of Deutsches Sportecho rapidly declined after the German reunification. The circulation had fallen to 34,000 copies by 1991. The paper subsequently ceased publication on 3 April 1991.
