= Fritz Becker =

German footballer (1888–1963)

Personal information
- Full name: Fritz Becker
- Date of birth: 13 September 1888
- Place of birth: Frankfurt, Germany
- Date of death: 22 February 1963 (aged 74)
- Place of death: Frankfurt, West Germany
- Position: Forward

Youth career
- –1904: Germania 1894
- 1904–1906: Frankfurter Kickers

Senior career*
Years	Team	Apps	(Gls)
1906–1911	Frankfurter Kickers		
1911–1920	Frankfurter FV		
1920–1921	Eintracht Frankfurt		
Total		+91	(+7)

International career
1908	Germany	1	(2)
- * Club domestic league appearances and goals

Fritz Becker (13 September 1888 – 22 February 1963) was a German professional footballer who played as a forward.

== Biography ==
He played for FC Germania 1894 Frankfurt before moving to FC Frankfurter Kickers (later to be known as Eintracht Frankfurt). He played for the Frankfurt club from 1904 to 1921.

In 1907 he was selected to a Frankfurt city XI that would play Newcastle United, and Becker scored two goals against the reigning English champions. After his glowing performance, he was invited to a test match in order to form a Germany national team.

On 5 April 1908, Becker went down in history as one of the eleven footballers who played in the first game of the Germany national team in a friendly against Switzerland, in which he scored the first-ever goal in the team's history. Despite scoring twice for his country, Becker ended up on the losing side with Germany going down 5-3. This was the only match he ever played for Germany.

Becker acted several times as the club's sports director, most recently in 1946–47. In his professional life, he worked as a councilor in the city's administration.

Fritz Becker was honorary club member and honorary captain at Eintracht Frankfurt.

== Honours ==
- Nordkreis-Liga
  - Champion: 1911–12+, 1912–13+, 1913–14+
- Southern German Championship
  - Runner-up: 1912–13+, 1913–14+
- + As Frankfurter FV
- Kreisliga Nordmain
  - Champion: 1919–20+, 1920–21

== Sources ==
- Matheja, Ulrich (2011). Unsere Eintracht - Eintracht Frankfurt - Die Chronik. Die Werkstatt. ISBN 978-3-89533-750-5.
