= SpVgg 1899 Leipzig =

German football club

SpVgg Leipzig
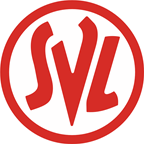
- Full name: Spielvereinigung Leipzig
- Founded: 1899; 126 years ago
- League: Stadtklasse Leipzig (IX)
- 2015–16: 4th
Home colours	Away colours

SpVgg Leipzig is a German association football club from the city of Leipzig, Saxony. It was formed on 15 February 1899 as the football department of gymnastics club ATV Leipzig-Lindenau and became independent as Spielvereinigung Leipzig in 1903. Alongside VfB Leipzig and Dresdner SC, SpVgg was one of the most successful pre-war sides in Saxony.

== History ==
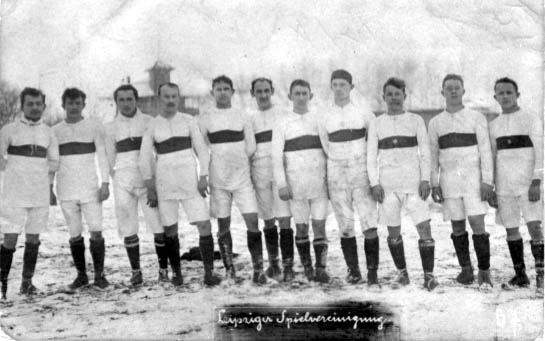
One of the first teams of the club

The club enjoyed its greatest successes in the 1910s and 1920s while competing in the regional central German league (Verbandes Mitteldeutscher Ballspiel-Vereine) where they won the title in 1912, 1914, 1922, and 1924. They also captured the Mittledeutscher Pokal (Central German Cup) in 1931. These victories qualified the team for the national playoffs where their furthest advance was to the semi-finals in 1912 and again in 1924.

In 1933, German football was reorganized by Nazi Germany into 16 top-flight regional circuits. SpVgg played a single season in the Gauliga Sachsen in 1937–38. In January 1944, they played alongside TuRa Leipzig to form the wartime side Kriegspielgemeinschaft Leipzig. The 1944–45 season ended prematurely as World War II overtook the country and the team was lost at war's end.

Organizations throughout the country, including sports and football clubs, were disbanded after the conflict as part of the process of denazification. New clubs soon emerged from the remnants of the pre-war associations and former SpVgg members established SG Lindenau-Hafen. In early 1949, SG and a number of other clubs including SG Leutzsch (out of the former membership of TuRa), SG Lindenau-Aue, SG Leipzig-Mitte, and SG Böhlitz-Ehrenberg were merged to create Zentrale Sportgemeinschaft Industrie Leipzig. The club was active in lower-tier competition in Soviet-occupied East Germany under several different names; ZSG Industrie Hafen-Leipzig (1949), SG Hafen Leipzig-Lindenau (1950), BSG Stahl Hafen Leipzig (1951), and later, as BSG Fortschritt West Leipzig, but was never able to win its way to higher-level competition.

In 1990, following German reunification, Fortschritt merged with BSG Motor Lindenau and reclaimed its historical identity as SpVgg Leipzig. The team still competes as a lower-tier side in the Stadtklasse Leipzig (IX).
