= Wilhelm Gmelin =

German footballer

Personal information
- Date of birth: 14 April 1891
- Place of birth: German empire
- Date of death: 9 December 1978 (aged 87)
- Place of death: West Germany
- Position: Goalkeeper

Senior career*
Years	Team	Apps	(Gls)
1907–1922	FFC Victoria / FFV / Eintracht Frankfurt	41+	(0)
- * Club domestic league appearances and goals

Wilhelm Gmelin (14 April 1891 – 9 December 1978) was a German football goalkeeper. He played club football with Eintracht Frankfurt and its predecessor clubs.

== Career ==
Goalkeeper Gmelin started his first team career in 1907 at Frankfurter FC Victoria 1899. Four years later Victoria merged with fellow Frankfurt club Frankfurter Kickers to form Frankfurter FV (Kickers-Victoria). Another nine years later another club merger formed Eintracht Frankfurt. In 1911–12 Gmelin's team only lost 2 of 23 matches, securing the Nordkreis championship and the qualification for the South German championship. In encounters with SpVgg Fürth, Karlsruher FV and Phönix Mannheim Frankfurter FC Victoria 1899 could only achieve two draws. In 1912–13 Victoria won the Nordkreis title once more and participated in another South German championship round where the Frankfurt club closely missed out the first spot that would have allowed playing the 1913 German championship. In the next season Gmelin's Victoria won the 3rd Nordkreis league in a row and another runners-up finish in the South German round. After the outbreak of World War I football fixtures were stopped. After the war many former football players met to revive competitive football. In 1920 and 1921 Gmelin won the Nordmain championship with Eintracht before hanging up his boots.

Wilhelm Gmelin was honorary captain at Eintracht Frankfurt.

== Honours ==
- Nordkreis-Liga
  - Champion: 1911–12, 1912–13, 1913–14
- Kreisliga Nordmain
  - Winner: 1919–20, 1920–21
  - Runner-up: 1921–22

== Sources ==
- Matheja, Ulrich (2011). Unsere Eintracht - Eintracht Frankfurt - Die Chronik. Die Werkstatt. ISBN 978-3-89533-750-5.
