= Wacker Leipzig =

German football club

SC Wacker Leipzig
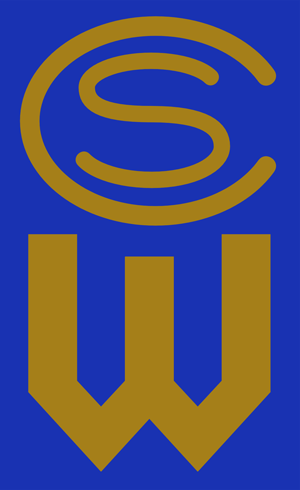
- Full name: Sport-Club Wacker Leipzig e.V.
- Founded: 24 February 1895
- Ground: Gohliser Exerzierplatz
- League: Mitteldeutschland
- –: folded 1945
Home colours	Away colours

SC Wacker Leipzig was a German association football club playing in Leipzig, Saxony. The club was formed 24 February 1895 out of the merger of the school clubs Concordia Leipzig and Saxonia Leipzig. Wacker was a founding member of the German Football Association (Deutscher Fussball Bund) in 1900.

FC changed its name to SC Wacker Leipzig in 1918 and in 1921 was joined by Friesen Leipzig. One of the city's best sides, Wacker remained in top-flight football from its foundation through to 1937. After the re-organization of German football into sixteen premier divisions under the Third Reich in 1933 Wacker played top-flight football in the Gauliga Sachsen for several seasons before being relegated in 1937. The club returned to Gauliga play for single season appearances in 1940 and 1944.

Allied authorities ordered all existing organizations, including sports and football associations, disbanded after World War II. The developing Cold War that would divide the country into East and West Germany led to the formation of separate football leagues in the Soviet-occupied areas which included Leipzig. Wacker was re-constituted as SG Motor Gohlis-Nord Leipzig and took up play in the Bezirk Leipzig in 1946 before advancing to the 2.DDR-Liga (III), Staffel 3 as Motor Nord Leipzig in 1958. The club fielded competitive teams that earned a handful of top three finishes before beginning a slide that finally led to relegation to the Bezirksliga Leipzig (IV) in 1963. After only a single season there the club disappeared into the lower divisions.

Wacker first played its home matches at the Gohlitzer Exerzierplatz (1902–23) before moving to the Wacker-Platz Debrahof (1923–45). Following the war they played in Wacker-Stadion Debrahof, known today as Stadion des Friedens.

== Honours ==
- Central German champions: 1902, 1908
- Mitteldeutscher-Pokal (Central German Cup) winners: 1929
