= Chemnitzer PSV =

German association football club from Chemnitz, Saxony

- Full name: Chemnitzer Polizeisportverein e.V.
- Founded: 16 August 1920; 104 years ago
- Ground: Stadion an der Clausstraße
- Capacity: 3,000
- Chairman: Volker Lange
- Website: https://www.cpsv.de/

Chemnitzer Polizeisportverein e.V. (commonly known as Chemnitzer PSV, or CPSV for short) is a German sports club in Chemnitz, Germany. Founded in 1920 as PSV Chemnitz, the club sees itself as their legal successor. With almost 2,000 members, CPSV is the second largest sports association in the city. Their current home is the sports field on Forststrasse at Zeisigwald and football is played at the Stadion an der Clausstraße. 22 different sports are practised in the club.

== History ==
The club was founded as "PSV Chemnitz" on 16 August 1920 by 37 police officers from the city of Chemnitz and initially consisted of the handball and football departments. The colours of the police sports club are still green and white today.

The Stadion an der Gellertstraße was built for the football section in 1934 and the police pool in the Zeisigwald for the swimming section from 1925 to 1927. The swimming pool later fell into disrepair and was converted into a tank farm by the Soviet Army in 1960; the stadium was taken over by the city of Chemnitz in 1950, and is now the home of Chemnitzer FC.

From 1942 the club played under the name "SG OrPo Chemnitz". In 1945 this was dissolved with the ban on clubs in the Soviet occupation zone.

On 4 October 1948, members of the police founded the "SV Police Chemnitz". Shortly after the club was founded in 1949, the sports club was opened to everyone. On 1 July 1949, the name was changed to “Sportverein Deutsche Volkspolizei Chemnitz” (SV DVP Chemnitz), in 1953 to “SG Dynamo Chemnitz” and shortly afterwards, with the renaming of the city from Chemnitz to Karl-Marx-Stadt, to “SG Dynamo Karl Marx City". With the political change in 1989/90, the association disintegrated.

Its current form as “Chemnitzer Polizeisportverein” was founded on 12 June 1990 by police officers, with their new home venue at Stadion an der Clausstraße inaugurated on 25 January 2002.

== Football ==
The club achieved national fame in the 1930s through its football team, which won the Central German football championship in 1932 with a 3–2 victory over Dresdner SC, and only failed in the quarter-finals of the 1932 German football championship at Bayern Munich. In 1933, the Chemnitz team reached the final of the Central German Championship again, but were defeated 1–3 by the Dresdner SC. In the subsequent final round of the German championship in 1933, PSV retired in the first round after a 1–6 defeat against FSV Frankfurt.

The Gauliga Sachsen was inaugurated in 1933, and PSV Chemntiz finished third in their debut season 1933–34, behind Dresdner SC and VfB Leipzig.

On 13 May 1934, PSV moved to a new stadium in Planitzstraße, later known as Stadion an der Gellertstraße, which opened with a 5–1 win in front of 25,000 spectators against SpVgg Fürth. In 1935 and 1936, PSV Chemnitz won the Gauliga Sachsen. In the final round of the German championship in 1935, the team made it to the semi-finals, but lost 2–3 against FC Schalke 04 at the Düsseldorf Rheinstadion.

In 1935, PSV won the Saxon Cup, defeating Sportfreunde 01 Dresden 6–1 in the final. In 1943 the club was relegated from the Gauliga Sachsen. In 1944, they were promoted to the Chemnitz Gauliga, which was cancelled after three games in the 1944/45 season. Another highlight in the club's history is the 5–2 win against Real Madrid CF in 1934, in which the player Erwin Helmchen scored three goals.

In the 1935–36 Reichsbundpokal (de), PSV won against Gauliga Südwest/Mainhessen team in the final, with Helmchen scoring nine goals in total.

In the 1936 German football championship group stage, PSV defeated Schalke 3–2 in front of 40,000 spectators in Dortmund's Stadion Rote Erde. However, Schalke managed to win 2–1 against PSV at Ostragehege to advance to the next round on goal difference.

PSV was runner-up in the 1936–37 season, then third in 1938 and 1941, but it was no longer enough to make another entry into the final round of the German championship.

=== Notable players ===
- Ernst Wilimowski, played four of his eight games for the Germany national team while at CPSV
- Erwin Helmchen, proficient all-time goalscorer
- Walter Rose

=== Honours ===
- Central German football championship

Champions: 1932

- Gauliga Sachsen

Champions: 1935, 1936

- Saxon Cup

Winners: 1935

== Handball ==
The field handball team became German champions in 1928 under the name of the Police Gymnastics Club Chemnitz-Gablenz, according to the version of the German Gymnastics Association. At the urging of DT, the handball department had to adopt the name "Police Gymnastics Club" for association policy reasons.

== Volleyball ==
The volleyball players have been playing under the name CPSV Volleys Chemnitz since 2001 in the Second Bundesliga South.

== Literature ==
- Hardy Grüne: Vereinlexikon (Encyclopedia of German league football. Volume 7). 1st edition. AGON, Kassel 2001, ISBN 3-89784-147-9, p. 107
- Gerhard Claus, Mario Schmidt (Red.): PSV Chemnitz. In: 100 years of Chemnitz football. Pictures, stories, tables. Chemnitzer Verlag, Chemnitz 1999, ISBN 3-928678-58-2
