= Chemnitzer BC =

German football club

- Full name: Chemnitzer Ballspiel-Club 1933 e. V.
- Founded: 1899
- Dissolved: 1945
Home colours	Away colours

Chemnitzer BC was a German association football club playing in Chemnitz, Saxony. The club was established 2 December 1899 as Chemnitzer Sportclub Britannia and was a founding member of the German Football Association (Deutscher Fußball Bund) at Leipzig in 1900.

== History ==
The team was renamed SC Britannia Chemnitz in April 1900 and through the first two decades of the century made regular appearances in the playoff rounds of the Verband Mitteldeutscher Ballspiel-Vereine (Middle German Football League), but was generally unable to advance past the semi-finals. The club's best results came in the late 20s. In 1927, they finished as vice-champions to VfB Leipzig and then advanced to the opening round of the national playoffs as regional cup winners, where they were put out by 1. FC Nürnberg (1–5). They made a second regional final appearance in 1929, but lost again, this time to Dresdner SC (2–3).

In November 1933 the club merged with Sportclub Sachsen 1909 Chemnitz but could not avoid bankruptcy and collapsed. The membership immediately re-established the association as Chemnitzer Ballspiel-Club 1933.

That same year German football was re-organized under the Third Reich into sixteen top flight Gauligen. Britannia took up play in the Gauliga Sachsen, but were immediately relegated. The team earned a return to the top flight in 1939 and finished second to Dresdner SC in group 2 of the division. Chemnitz fell to a mid-table side as play in the Gauliga Sachsen came to be almost completely dominated by Dresden to near the end of World War II. As the war overcame that part of the country the Gauliga was broken up into a number of smaller city-based divisions and play in the 1944–45 season was incomplete.

After the war occupying Allied authorities ordered most organizations in Germany disbanded, including sports and football clubs. In late 1945, the formation of new clubs was allowed and the former membership of CBC became part of SG Chemnitz-West. The team then went through a succession of name changes as was common in East German football playing briefly as BSG Nagema Chemnitz (1950–51) and then BSG Stahlwerk Chemnitz (1951–52). The city of Chemnitz itself was then renamed Karl-Marx-Stadt in 1953, and the football club followed suit becoming BSG Stahl Karl-Marx-Stadt, later BSG Chemie Karl-Marx-Stadt. In 1956, Chemie was attached into SC Karl-Marx-Stadt and in 1966 it was separated as FC Karl-Marx-Stadt. After German re-unification in 1990 the city's original name was restored and the team played as Chemnitzer FC.

== Stadium ==
Chemnitz played its home matches at the Garrison-Exerzierplatz until 1917, and at Bernhardstraße until 1926. In 1926, they moved to the Kampfbahn an der Reichenhainer Straße which had a capacity of 10,000. The facility underwent several name changes – Südkampfbahn (1933–38), Großkampfbahn (1938–45), Ernst-Thälmann-Stadion (1945–1992) – and is today known as the Sportforum Chemnitz.

== Honours ==
- Mitteldeutscher Pokal (Central German Cup): 1927
