= Gauliga Sachsen =

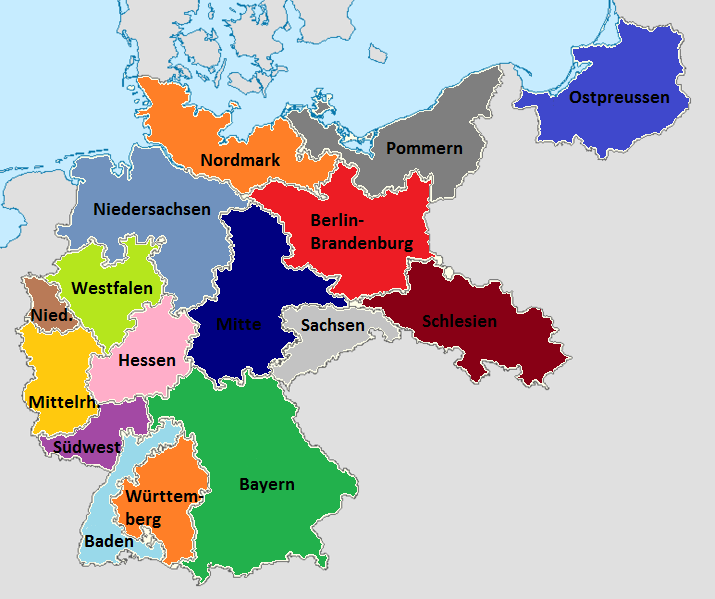
- Founded: 1933
- Folded: 1945
- Replaced by: DDR-Oberliga
- Country: Nazi Germany
- State: Saxony
- Gau (from 1934): Gau Saxony
- Level on pyramid: Level 1
- Domestic cup: Tschammerpokal
- Last champions: Dresdner SC (1943-44)

The Gauliga Saxony was the highest football league in the German state of Saxony (German:Sachsen) from 1933 to 1945. Shortly after the formation of the league, the Nazis reorganised the administrative regions in Germany, and the Gau Saxony replaced the state Saxony.

== Overview ==
The league was introduced by the Nazi Sports Office in 1933, after the Nazi takeover of power in Germany. It replaced the Bezirksligas and Oberligas as the highest level of play in German football competitions.

In its first season, the league had eleven clubs, playing each other once at home and once away. The league champion then qualified for the German championship. The bottom three teams were relegated. The season after, the league was reduced to ten teams. It operated on the same modus until the outbreak of World War II in 1939.

Due to the effects of the war, the 1939–40 season was played in two regional groups of six teams each with a home-and-away final between the two group winners.

During the war years, the Dresdner SC became a dominating force in German football, with two championships, in 1943 and 1944, a lost final in 1940 and two cup wins in 1940 and 1941. The VfB Leipzig was the other team from the league with a national title, winning the German Cup in 1936. Those successes made the Gauliga Sachsen one of the strongest competitions in the country.

In the 1940–41 season, the Gauliga Sachsen returned to a single division format, now with twelve clubs. This number was reduced to ten for the next season and remained at this strength until 1944.

The imminent collapse of Nazi Germany in 1945 gravely affected all Gauligas and football in the region was split into seven regional groups. However, none of them played more than a few games before the arrival of the Red Army, and the end of the war terminated all competitions.

== Aftermath ==
With the end of the Nazi era, the Gauligas ceased to exist and the region found itself in the Soviet occupation zone. The DDR-Oberliga was formed in the following years as the highest level of play in the new country of East Germany and the region became part of the East German football league system.

Virtually all football clubs in the region were dissolved and replaced with clubs controlled by the new communist government. Of those, some readopted the pre-1945 names after the German reunification in 1990.

== Founding members of the league ==
The eleven founding members and their league placing in 1932-33 were:

- Dresdner SC, champion Ostsachsen division
- VfB Leipzig
- Polizei SV Chemnitz, champion Mittelsachsen division
- SV Guts Muts Dresden
- Wacker Leipzig, champions Nordwestsachsen division
- VfB Glauchau, champion Westsachsen division
- Plauener SuBC
- Planitzer SC
- Chemnitzer BC
- VFC Plauen
- SpVgg Falkenstein, champion Vogtland division

== Winners and runners-up of the league ==
The winners and runners-up of the league:

Season	Winner	Runner-up
1933–34	Dresdner SC	VfB Leipzig
1934–35	PSV Chemnitz	Dresdner SC
1935–36	PSV Chemnitz	Dresdner SC
1936–37	BC 01 Hartha	PSV Chemnitz
1937–38	BC 01 Hartha	SV Fortuna Leipzig
1938–39	Dresdner SC	VfB Leipzig
1939–40	Dresdner SC	Planitzer SC
1940–41	Dresdner SC	Planitzer SC
1941–42	Planitzer SC	Dresdner SC
1942–43	Dresdner SC	Planitzer SC
1943–44	Dresdner SC	SG Zwickau

== Placings in the league 1933–1944 ==
The complete list of all clubs participating in the league:

Club	1934	1935	1936	1937	1938	1939	1940	1941	1942	1943	1944
Dresdner SC	1	2	2	4	4	1	1	1	2	1	1
VfB Leipzig	2	6	5	5	5	2	3	5	5	7	10
PSV Chemnitz	3	1	1	2	3	5	3	3	4	9	
Guths Muts Dresden	4	4	4	8	8	8	6		10		
Wacker Leipzig	5	8	7	10				11			
VfB Glauchau	6	10					4	12			
SuBC Plauen	7	9									
SC Planitz	8	7	8	3	6	4	1	2	1	2	7
Chemnitzer BC	9						2	6	3	4	4
VFC Plauen	10										
SpVgg Falkenstein	11										
SV Fortuna Leipzig		3	3	7	2	6	2	8	7	6	9
Sportfreunde Dresden		5	9			7	5	10			
BC Hartha			6	1	1	3	4	9		3	3
Dresdensia Dresden			10								
Tura Leipzig				6	7	10	5	7	9		8
Riesaer SV 03				9				4	6	5	6
SpVgg Leipzig					9						
SV Grüna					10						
Concordia Plauen						9	6				
SC Döbeln									8	8	5
Sportlust Zittau										10	
SG Zwickau											2
