= 1922 German football championship =

1922 German championship
Deutsche Fußballmeisterschaft
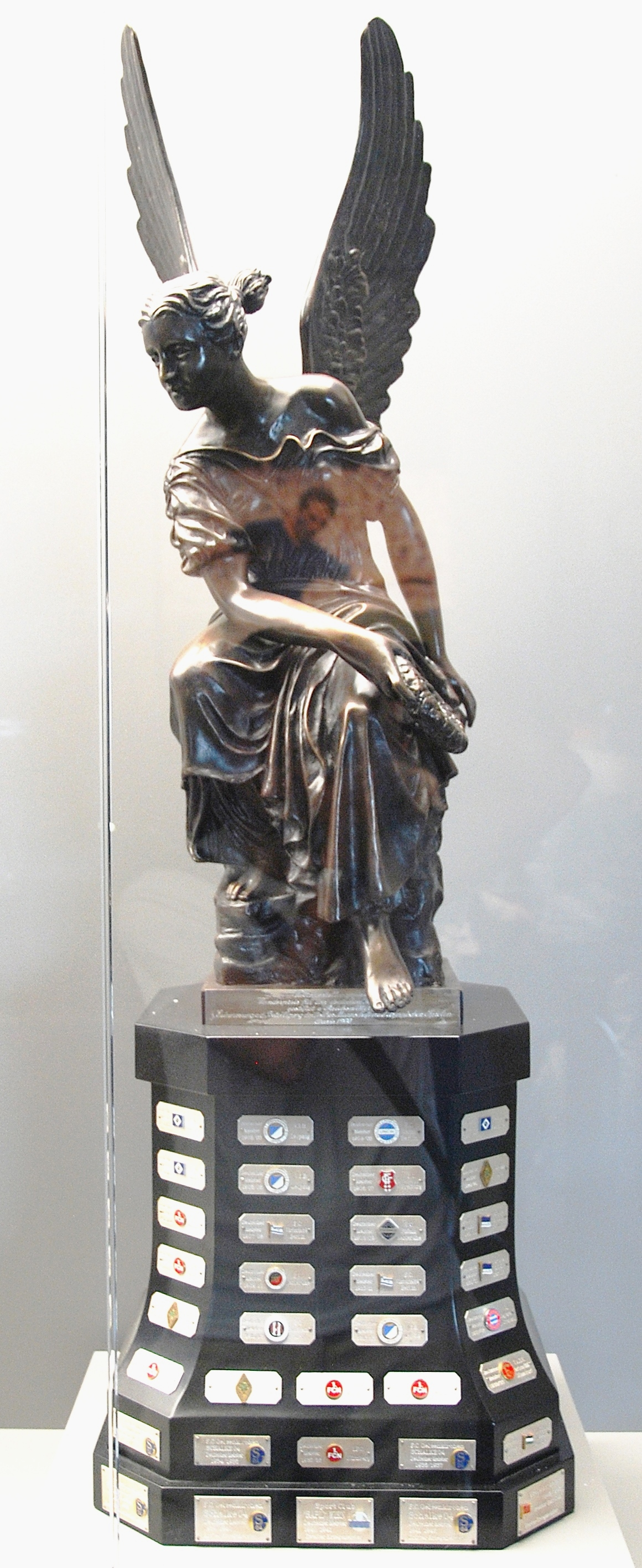
- Replica of the Viktoria trophy

Tournament details
- Country: Germany
- Dates: 21 May – 6 August
- Teams: 8

Final positions
- Champions: No champion declared

Tournament statistics
- Matches played: 8
- Goals scored: 25 (3.13 per match)
- Top goal scorer(s): Ludwig Breuel; Otto Harder; Luitpold Popp; Karl Schneider; Hans Semmler; Heinrich Träg (3 goals each)

The 1922 German football championship, the 15th edition of the competition, saw no champion determined after the first final ended in a two-all draw and the replay in a one-all draw. Hamburger SV was initially awarded the title because the other finalist, 1. FC Nürnberg, had eventually been reduced to seven players in the replay, below the required number of eight, causing an abandonment. Hamburg was awarded the title but Nuremberg successfully protested. Hamburg launched a counter-protest and was eventually awarded the title but then declined the championship, leaving the 1921–22 season without an official champions. It was the second and last time, after 1904, that a German championship concluded without a champion.

Of the two finalists Hamburg went on to win the championship the following season while Nuremberg, champions of 1920 and 1921 would win the 1924 edition by defeating Hamburg in the final, followed by another title in 1925, making the two clubs the dominant force of the first six post-First World War seasons.

Six players finished as joint top scorers of the 1922 championship, all with three goals each.

Eight clubs qualified for the knock-out competition, nominally the champions of each of the seven regional football championships and the previous seasons German champion. However both the Baltic and the South Eastern German championships were later awarded to different teams, VfB Königsberg and Sportfreunde Breslau, than the ones qualified for the German championship.

== Qualified teams ==
The teams qualified through the regional championships:

Club	Qualified as
Titania Stettin	Baltic championship representative
Viktoria Forst	South Eastern German championship representative
SV Norden-Nordwest	Brandenburg champion
SpVgg Leipzig	Central German champions
Hamburger SV	Northern German champions
TG Arminia Bielefeld	Western German champions
FC Wacker München	Southern German champions
1. FC Nürnberg	Defending champions

== Competition ==
=== Quarter-finals ===
21 May 1922

SpVgg Leipzig	0 – 3	1. FC Nürnberg
		Popp 65', 69'; Träg 76'

HWG-Stadion am Zoo, Halle
Attendance: 16,000
Referee: Cornelius

21 May 1922

SV Norden-Nordwest	1 – 0	Viktoria Forst
Montag 85'

Platz des BFC Viktoria, Berlin
Attendance: 10,000
Referee: Chemnitz

21 May 1922

Hamburger SV	5 – 0	Titania Stettin
Harder 5', 25'; Schneider 30', 60'; Breuel 63'

Stadion Hoheluft, Hamburg
Attendance: 12,000
Referee: Niederberger

21 May 1922

Wacker München	5 – 0	TG Arminia Bielefeld
Semmler 9', 31', 36'; Schaffer 50' (pen.); Nebauer 72'

Telegrafenkaserne, Karlsruhe
Attendance: 10,000
Referee: Koppehel

=== Semi-finals ===
4 June 1922

1. FC Nürnberg	1 – 0	SV Norden-Nordwest
Böß 10'

Sportpark Ronhof, Fürth
Attendance: 20,000
Referee: Kiemeyer

4 June 1922

Hamburger SV	4 – 0	Wacker München
Breuel 25', 32'; Harder 62'; Flohr 65' (pen.)

Stadion am Riederwald, Frankfurt
Attendance: 18,000
Referee: Bauwens

=== Final ===
18 June 1922

Hamburger SV	2–2 (a.e.t.)	1. FC Nürnberg
Rave 19'; Flohr 86'	Report	Träg 20'; Popp 30'

Deutsches Stadion, Berlin
Attendance: 30,000
Referee: P. Bauwens (Cologne)

HAMBURGER SV
GK	(Weimar Republic) Hans Martens
RB	(Weimar Republic) Albert Beier
LB	(Weimar Republic) Gustav Schmerbach
RH	(Weimar Republic) Hans Flohr
CH	(Norway) Asbjørn Halvorsen
LH	(Weimar Republic) Hans Krohn
OR	(Weimar Republic) Walter Kolzen
IR	(Weimar Republic) Ludwig Breuel
CF	(Weimar Republic) Otto Harder (c)
IL	(Weimar Republic) Karl Schneider
OL	(Weimar Republic) Hans Rave
Manager:
(England) Albert Wilhelm Turner

1. FC NÜRNBERG
GK	(Weimar Republic) Heinrich Stuhlfauth
RB	(Switzerland) Gustav Bark
LB	(Weimar Republic) Michael Grünerwald
RH	(Weimar Republic) Emil Köpplinger
CH	(Weimar Republic) Anton Kugler
LH	(Weimar Republic) Carl Riegel
OR	(Weimar Republic) Wolfgang Strobel
IR	(Weimar Republic) Luitpold Popp
CF	(Weimar Republic) Willy Böß
IL	(Weimar Republic) Heinrich Träg (c)
OL	(Weimar Republic) Hans Sutor
Manager:
(Hungary) Izidor Kürschner

- Match abandoned after 189 minutes due to darkness.

==== Replay ====
6 August 1922

Hamburger SV	1–1 (a.e.t.)	1. FC Nürnberg
Schneider 69'	Report	Träg 48'

Probstheidaer Stadion, Leipzig
Attendance: 50,000
Referee: P. Bauwens (Cologne)

HAMBURGER SV
GK	(Weimar Republic) Hans Martens
RB	(Weimar Republic) Albert Beier
LB	(Weimar Republic) Rudi Agte
RH	(Weimar Republic) Hans Flohr
CH	(Norway) Asbjørn Halvorsen
LH	(Weimar Republic) Hans Krohn
OR	(Weimar Republic) Walter Kolzen
IR	(Weimar Republic) Ludwig Breuel
CF	(Weimar Republic) Otto Harder (c)
IL	(Weimar Republic) Karl Schneider
OL	(Weimar Republic) Hans Rave
Manager:
(England) Albert Wilhelm Turner

1. FC NÜRNBERG
GK	(Weimar Republic) Heinrich Stuhlfauth
RB	(Switzerland) Gustav Bark
LB	(Weimar Republic) Anton Kugler (injured) (substituted off) 75'
RH	(Weimar Republic) Emil Köpplinger
CH	(Weimar Republic) Carl Riegel
LH	(Weimar Republic) Reitzenstein
OR	(Weimar Republic) Wolfgang Strobel
IR	(Weimar Republic) Luitpold Popp (injured) (substituted off) 105'
CF	(Weimar Republic) Willy Böß (red card) 18'
IL	(Weimar Republic) Heinrich Träg (c) (red card) 100'
OL	(Weimar Republic) Hans Sutor
Manager:
(Hungary) Izidor Kürschner

- Replay abandoned due to Nuremberg having only seven players remaining. The championship was initially awarded to Hamburg, but following a series of protests, the club later declined the title.
