= 1926 German football championship =

1926 German championship
Deutsche Fußballmeisterschaft
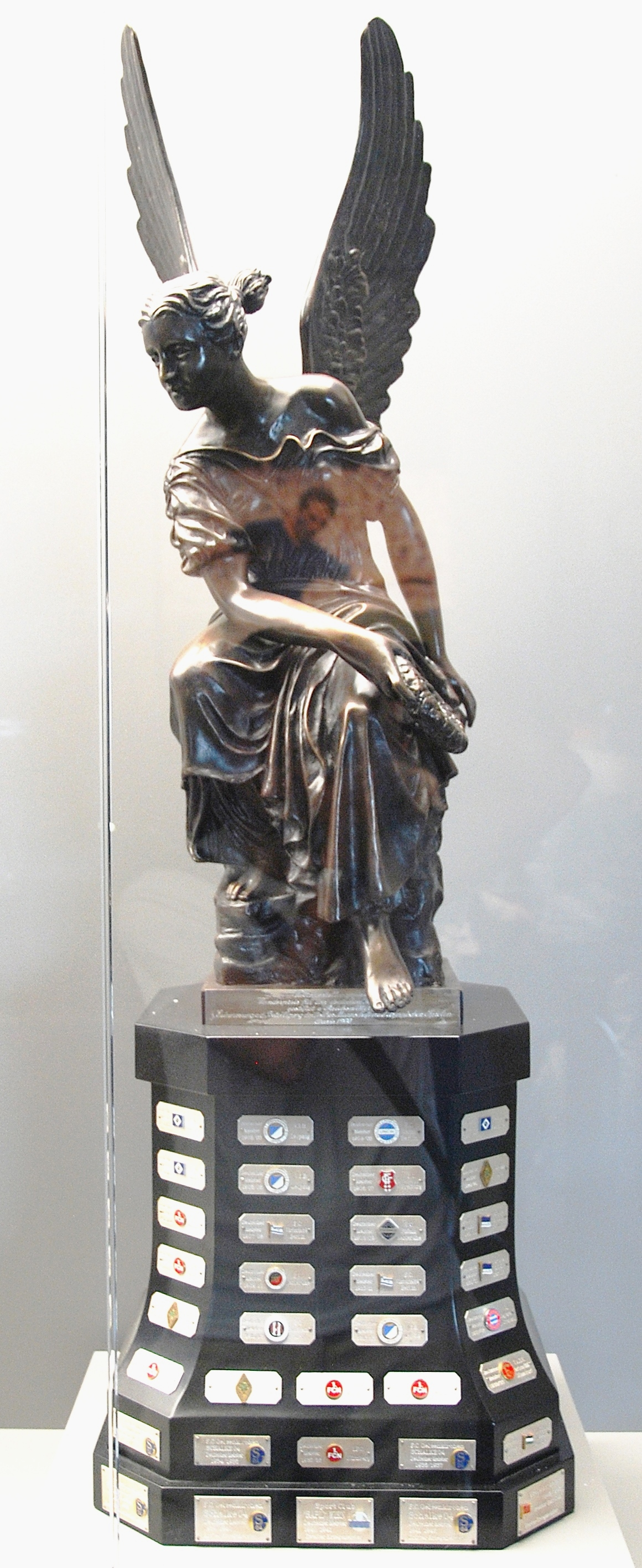
- Replica of the Viktoria trophy

Tournament details
- Country: Germany
- Dates: 16 May – 13 June
- Teams: 16

Final positions
- Champions: SpVgg Fürth; 2nd German title
- Runners-up: Hertha BSC

Tournament statistics
- Matches played: 15
- Goals scored: 73 (4.87 per match)
- Top goal scorer: Otto Harder (6 goals)

The 1926 German football championship, the 19th edition of the competition, was won by SpVgg Fürth, defeating Hertha BSC 4–1 in the final.

For SpVgg Fürth it was the second national championship after winning the 1914 edition and it won a third and last one in 1929, also against Hertha BSC. For Hertha it marked the club's first final appearance and it played in six consecutive ones, losing the first four and winning the final two in 1930 and 1931.

Hamburger SV's Tull Harder was the top scorer of the 1926 championship with six goals, having previously done so in 1922 and 1923 and, again, in 1928.

Sixteen club qualified for the knock-out competition, two from each of the regional federations plus an additional third club from the South and West. In all cases the regional champions and runners-up qualified. In the West and South the third spot went to the third placed team of the championship.

The eventual champions, SpVgg Fürth, failed to qualify for the Southern German championship through the Bezirksliga Bayern, coming only third behind league champions FC Bayern Munich runners-up 1. FC Nürnberg, when only the champions advanced. Instead, Fürth won the Southern German Cup and qualified through this route for the Southern German finals where it than finished runners-up.

== Qualified teams ==
The teams qualified through the regional championships:

Club	Qualified as
VfB Königsberg	Baltic champions
Stettiner SC	Baltic runners-up
Breslauer SC 08	South Eastern German champions
Viktoria Forst	South Eastern German runners-up
Hertha BSC	Brandenburg champion
Norden-Nordwest Berlin	Brandenburg runners-up
Dresdner SC	Central German champions
Fortuna Leipzig	Central German runners-up
Holstein Kiel	Northern German champions
Hamburger SV	Northern German runners-up
VfR Köln	Western German champions
BV Altenessen	Western German runners-up
Duisburger SpV	Western German third placed team
FC Bayern Munich	Southern German champions
SpVgg Fürth	Southern German runners-up
FSV Frankfurt	Southern German additional qualifier

== Competition ==
=== Round of 16 ===
The round of 16, played on 16 May 1926:

Team 1	Score	Team 2
Fortuna Leipzig	2–0	FC Bayern Munich
FSV Frankfurt	2–1	BV Altenessen
Duisburger SpV	1–3	Hamburger SV
Hertha BSC	4–0	VfB Königsberg
Holstein Kiel	8–2	SC Stettin
VfR Köln	1–2	Norden-Nordwest Berlin
SC Breslau 08	1–0	Dresdner SC
SpVgg Fürth	5–0	Viktoria Forst

=== Quarter-finals ===
The quarter-finals, played on 30 May 1926:

Team 1	Score	Team 2
Hamburger SV	6–2	Fortuna Leipzig
Hertha BSC	8–2	FSV Frankfurt
Norden-Nordwest Berlin	0–4	Holstein Kiel
SpVgg Fürth	4–0	SC Breslau 08

=== Semi-finals ===
The semi-finals, played on 6 June 1926:

Team 1	Score	Team 2
Hertha BSC	4–2	Hamburger SV
SpVgg Fürth	3–1	Holstein Kiel

=== Final ===
13 June 1926
17:00 CET

SpVgg Fürth	4–1	Hertha BSC
Seiderer 27'; Auer 35'; Leuschner 38' (o.g.); Ascherl 68'	Report	Ruch 9'

Waldstadion, Frankfurt
Attendance: 40,000
Referee: F. Spranger (Glauchau)

SPVGG FÜRTH
GK	(Weimar Republic) Gustav Hörgreen
RB	(Weimar Republic) Josef Müller
LB	(Weimar Republic) Hans Hagen
RH	(Weimar Republic) Hans Krauß
CH	(Weimar Republic) Ludwig Leinberger
LH	(Weimar Republic) Konrad Kleinlein
OR	(Weimar Republic) Karl Auer
IR	(Weimar Republic) Andreas Franz
CF	(Weimar Republic) Leonhard Seiderer (c)
IL	(Weimar Republic) Willy Ascherl
OL	(Weimar Republic) Georg Kießling
Manager:
(England) William Townley

HERTHA BSC
GK	(Weimar Republic) Alfred Götze
RB	(Weimar Republic) Emil Domscheidt
LB	(Weimar Republic) Max Fischer
RH	(Weimar Republic) Otto Leuschner
CH	(Weimar Republic) Karl Tewes
LH	(Weimar Republic) Willi Völker
OR	(Weimar Republic) Hans Ruch
IR	(Weimar Republic) Hanne Sobek
CF	(Weimar Republic) Hans Grenzel
IL	(Weimar Republic) Willi Kirsei (c)
OL	(Weimar Republic) Erich Gülle
Manager:
(Austria) Alexander Popovich
