= 1929 German football championship =

1929 German championship
Deutsche Fußballmeisterschaft
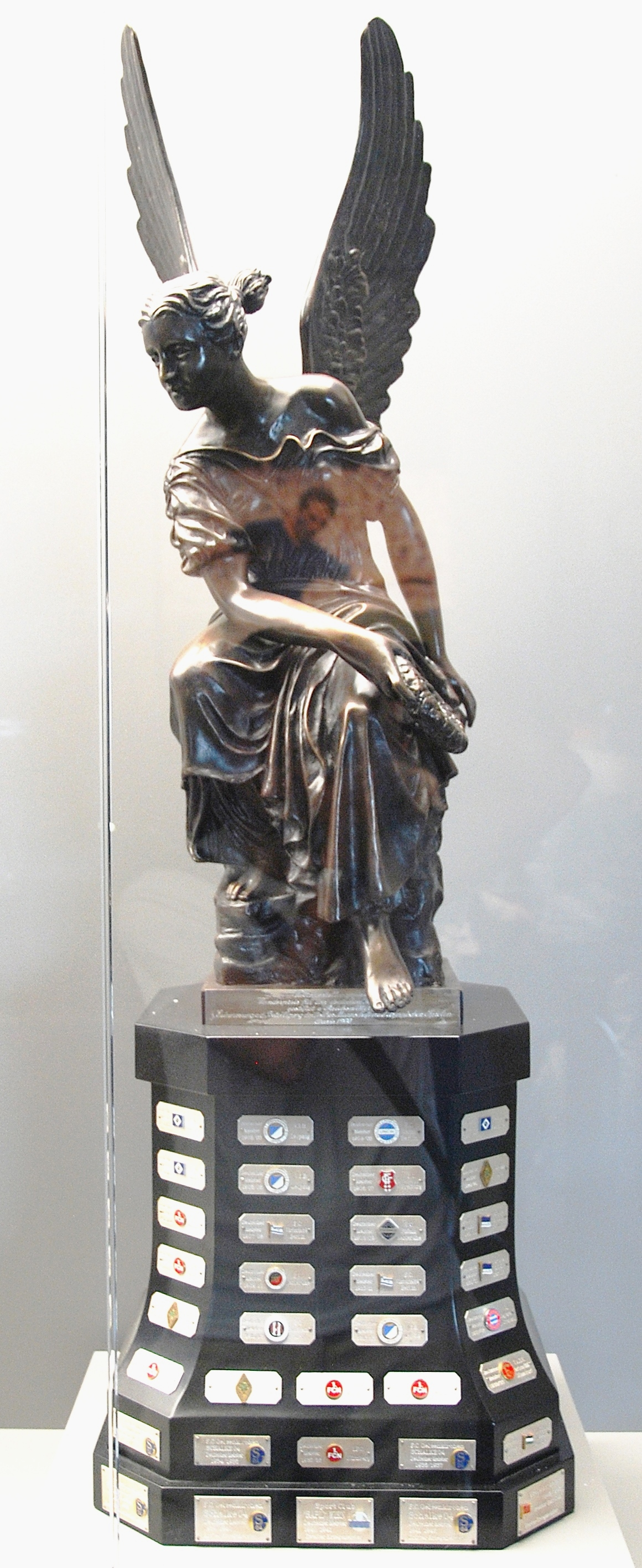
- Replica of the Viktoria trophy

Tournament details
- Country: Germany
- Dates: 9 June – 28 July
- Teams: 16

Final positions
- Champions: SpVgg Fürth; 3rd German title
- Runners-up: Hertha BSC

Tournament statistics
- Matches played: 16
- Goals scored: 79 (4.94 per match)
- Top goal scorer: Hanne Sobek (6 goals)

The 1929 German football championship, the 22nd edition of the competition, was won by SpVgg Fürth, defeating Hertha BSC 3–2 in the final.

For SpVgg Fürth it was the third national championship after wins in 1914 and 1926 but the club would never again appear in the final after 1929. It was the last highlight of the decade after the First World War that saw seven of the ten national championships go to Middle Franconian clubs 1. FC Nürnberg and SpVgg Fürth. For Hertha BSC it marked the fourth consecutive final loss, the only club to do so. Hertha had previously lost the 1926 final to Fürth as well but would go on to win back-to-back championships in 1930 and 1931.

Hertha's Hanne Sobek was the top scorer of the 1929 championship with six goals.

Sixteen club qualified for the knock-out competition, two from each of the regional federations plus an additional third club from the South and West. In all cases the regional champions qualified and almost all of the runners-up, except in Central Germany where the second spot went to the regional cup winner. In the West the third spot went to the third placed team of the championship while, in the South, the third spot was determined in a separate qualifying competition for runners-up and third placed teams.

== Qualified teams ==
The teams qualified through the regional championships:

Club	Qualified as
VfB Königsberg	Baltic champions
Titania Stettin	Baltic runners-up
Preussen Hindenburg	South Eastern German champions
Breslauer SC 08	South Eastern German runners-up
Hertha BSC	Brandenburg champion
Tennis Borussia Berlin	Brandenburg runners-up
Dresdner SC	Central German champions
Wacker Leipzig	Central German cup winner
Hamburger SV	Northern German champions
Holstein Kiel	Northern German runners-up
Schalke 04	Western German champions
Meidericher SV	Western German runners-up
Fortuna Düsseldorf	Western German third placed team
1. FC Nürnberg	Southern German champions
FC Bayern Munich	Southern German runners-up
SpVgg Fürth	Southern German additional qualifier

== Competition ==
=== Round of 16 ===
The round of 16, played on 9 and 16 June 1929:

Team 1	Score	Team 2
FC Bayern Munich	3–0	Dresdner SC
Holstein Kiel	1–6	1. FC Nürnberg
Wacker Leipzig	1–5	Schalke 04
Meidericher SpV	2–3	Hamburger SV
Preussen Hindenburg	1–8	Hertha BSC
VfB Königsberg	1–2	SC Breslau 08
SpVgg Fürth	5–1	Fortuna Düsseldorf
Tennis Borussia Berlin	3–2	Titania Stettin

=== Quarter-finals ===
The quarter-finals, played on 30 June 1929:

Team 1	Score	Team 2
1. FC Nürnberg	3–1	Tennis Borussia Berlin
Schalke 04	1–4	Hertha BSC
SC Breslau 08	4–3	FC Bayern Munich
Hamburger SV	0–2	SpVgg Fürth

=== Semi-finals ===
The semi-finals, played on 7 July 1929, with the replay played on 21 July:

Team 1	Score	Team 2
Hertha BSC	0–0	1. FC Nürnberg
SpVgg Fürth	6–1	SC Breslau 08

==== Replay ====
Team 1	Score	Team 2
Hertha BSC	3–2	1. FC Nürnberg

=== Final ===
28 July 1929
17:00 CET

SpVgg Fürth	3–2	Hertha BSC
Auer 14'; Frank 66'; Rupprecht 85'	Report	Sobek 43', 76'

Städtisches Stadion, Nuremberg
Attendance: 50,000
Referee: P. Bauwens (Cologne)

SPVGG FÜRTH
GK	(Weimar Republic) Hans Neger
RB	(Weimar Republic) Hans Hagen (Note: Hagen left the pitch injured around the 70th minute, returning around the 76th minute.) (c)
LB	(Weimar Republic) Hans Krauß
RH	(Weimar Republic) Paul Röschke
CH	(Weimar Republic) Ludwig Leinberger
LH	(Weimar Republic) Konrad Krauß
OR	(Weimar Republic) Heinrich Auer
IR	(Weimar Republic) Karl Rupprecht
CF	(Weimar Republic) Andreas Franz
IL	(Weimar Republic) Georg Frank
OL	(Weimar Republic) Georg Kießling
Manager:
None

HERTHA BSC
GK	(Weimar Republic) Paul Gehlhaar
RB	(Weimar Republic) Emil Domscheidt
LB	(Weimar Republic) Hermann Schulz (injured) (substituted off) 64'
RH	(Weimar Republic) Otto Leuschner
CH	(Weimar Republic) Ernst Müller
LH	(Weimar Republic) Willi Völker
OR	(Weimar Republic) Hans Ruch
IR	(Weimar Republic) Hanne Sobek (c)
CF	(Weimar Republic) Otto Fritze
IL	(Weimar Republic) Bruno Lehmann
OL	(Weimar Republic) Willi Kirsei
Manager:
(Weimar Republic) Richard Girulatis
