= 1920 German football championship =

1920 German championship
Deutsche Fußballmeisterschaft
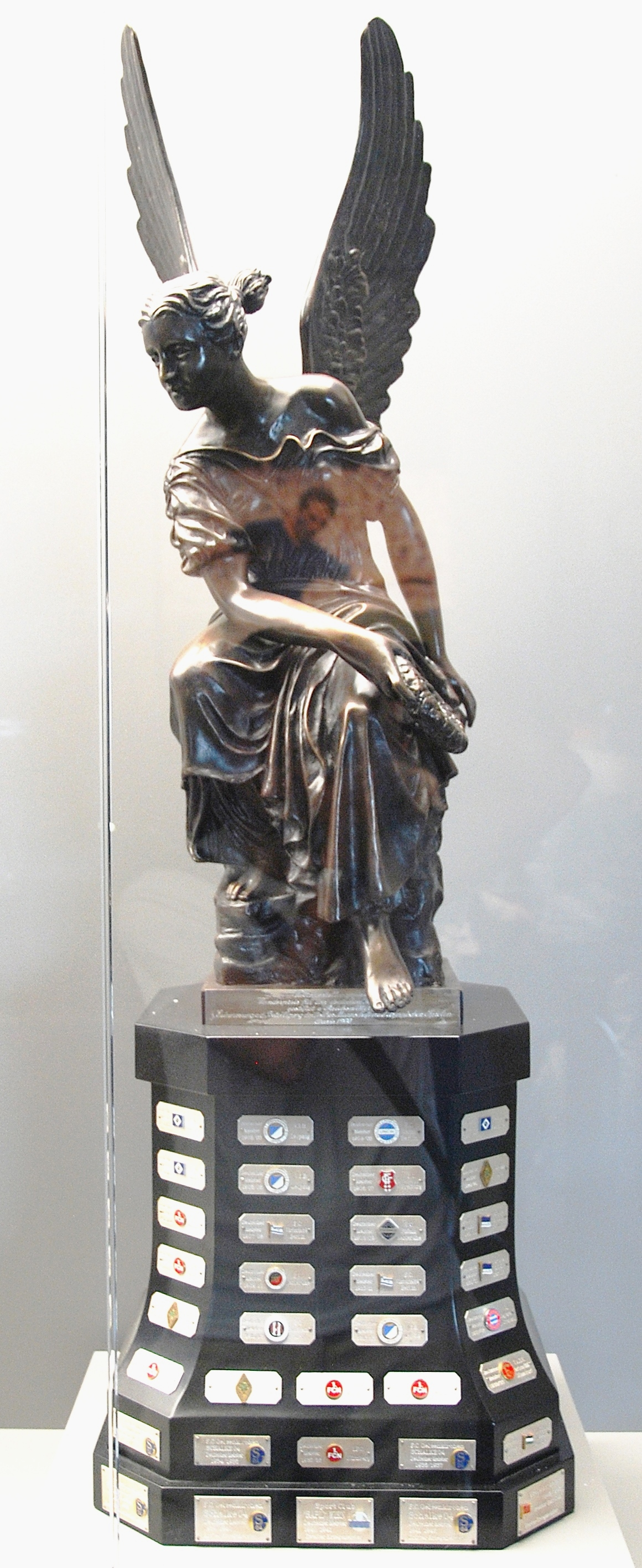
- Replica of the Viktoria trophy

Tournament details
- Country: Germany
- Dates: 16 May – 13 June
- Teams: 8

Final positions
- Champions: 1. FC Nürnberg; 1st German title
- Runners-up: SpVgg Fürth

Tournament statistics
- Matches played: 7
- Goals scored: 26 (3.71 per match)
- Top goal scorer(s): Viktor Hierländer; Leonhard Seiderer; Heinrich Träg (4 goals each)

The 1920 German football championship, the 13th edition of the competition, was won by 1. FC Nürnberg, defeating SpVgg Fürth 2–0 in the final. It was the first edition of the championship after the First World War and was staged six years after the previous championship in 1914.

For 1. FC Nürnberg it was the first national championship and was the start of Nuremberg's most successful era where the club won five titles in eight seasons from 1920 to 1927, missing out on a sixth one in the inconclusive 1922 championship. Fürth, the defending champions, would go on to win the 1926 and 1929 championship. It was the only encounter of the two Middle Franconian rivals in the final.

Nürnberg's Heinrich Träg and Fürth's Lony Seiderer and Viktor Hierländer were the top scorer of the 1920 championship with four goals each.

Eight clubs qualified for the knock-out competition, the champions of each of the seven regional football championships and the defending German champions.

== Qualified teams ==
The teams qualified through the regional championships:

Club	Qualified as
Titania Stettin	Baltic champions
Sportfreunde Breslau	South Eastern German champions
Union Oberschöneweide	Brandenburg champion
VfB Leipzig	Central German champions
SV Arminia Hannover	Northern German champions
VfTuR Mönchengladbach	Western German champions
1. FC Nürnberg	Southern German champions
SpVgg Fürth	Holders

== Competition ==
=== Quarter-finals ===
The quarter-finals, played on 16 May 1920:

Team 1	Score	Team 2
1. FC Nürnberg	2–0	VfB Leipzig
Sportfreunde Breslau	3–2	Union Oberschöneweide
SpVgg Fürth	7–0	VfTuR Mönchengladbach
Titania Stettin	2–1 aet	SV Arminia Hannover

=== Semi-finals ===
The semi-finals, played on 30 May 1920:

Team 1	Score	Team 2
1. FC Nürnberg	3–0	Titania Stettin
SpVgg Fürth	4–0	Sportfreunde Breslau

=== Final ===
13 June 1920
c. 16:05 CET

1. FC Nürnberg	2–0	SpVgg Fürth
Popp 12'; Szabó 73'	Report

Sportplatz Sandhöfer Wiesen, Frankfurt
Attendance: 35,000
Referee: P. Bauwens (Cologne)

1. FC NÜRNBERG
GK	(Weimar Republic) Heinrich Stuhlfauth
RB	(Switzerland) Gustav Bark (c)
LB	(Weimar Republic) Johann Steinlein
RH	(Weimar Republic) Anton Kugler
CH	(Weimar Republic) Hans Kalb
LH	(Weimar Republic) Carl Riegel
OR	(Weimar Republic) Wolfgang Strobel
IR	(Weimar Republic) Luitpold Popp
CF	(Weimar Republic) Willy Böß
IL	(Weimar Republic) Heinrich Träg
OL	(Hungary) Péter Szabó
Player-manager:
(Switzerland) Gustav Bark

SPVGG FÜRTH
GK	(Weimar Republic) Ludwig Gebhardt
RB	(Weimar Republic) Hans Ammerbacher
LB	(Weimar Republic) Georg Wellhöfer
RH	(Weimar Republic) Heinrich Schuster
CH	(Weimar Republic) Hans Hagen
LH	(Weimar Republic) Georg Löblein
OR	(Weimar Republic) Leopold Fiederer
IR	(Weimar Republic) Andreas Franz
CF	(Weimar Republic) Leonhard Seiderer (c)
IL	(Austria) Viktor Hierländer
OL	(Weimar Republic) Hans Sutor
Manager:
(Weimar Republic) Hans Ruff
