= 1924 German football championship =

1924 German championship
Deutsche Fußballmeisterschaft
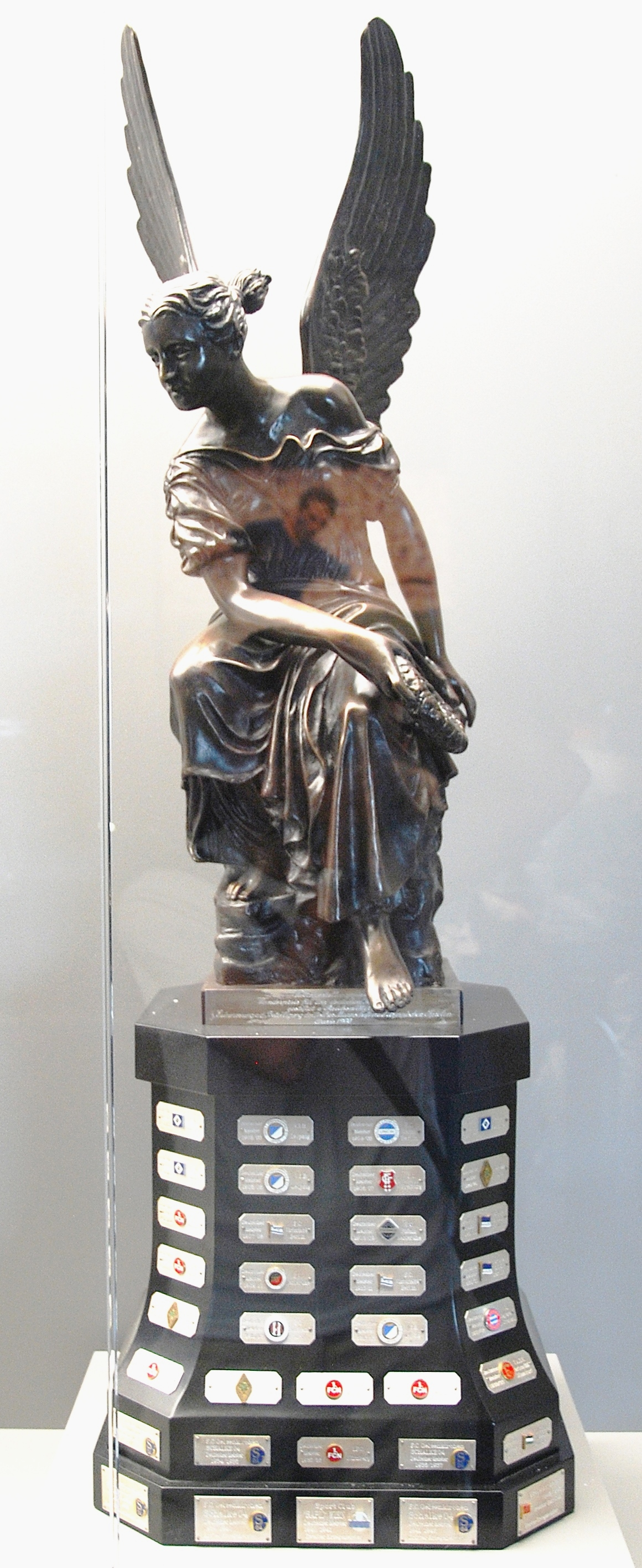
- Replica of the Viktoria trophy

Tournament details
- Country: Germany
- Dates: 11 May – 9 June
- Teams: 7

Final positions
- Champions: 1. FC Nürnberg; 3rd German title
- Runners-up: Hamburger SV

Tournament statistics
- Matches played: 6
- Goals scored: 24 (4 per match)
- Top goal scorer(s): Luitpold Popp; Erich Roßburg (3 goals each)

The 1924 German football championship, the 17th edition of the competition, was won by 1. FC Nürnberg, defeating Hamburger SV 2–0 in the final.

For 1. FC Nürnberg it was the third national championship. It was part of Nuremberg's most successful era where the club won five titles in eight seasons from 1920 to 1927, missing out on a sixth one in the inconclusive 1922 championship. For Hamburger SV, the defending champions, it was the third final appearance in three season, having faced Nuremberg once before in the 1922 final. Hamburg's next final appearance would come in 1928 when it defeated Hertha BSC.

SpVgg Leipzig's Erich Roßburg and 1. FC Nürnberg's Luitpold Popp were the top scorers of the 1924 championship with three goals each.

Seven club qualified for the knock-out competition, the champions of each of the seven regional football championships. It was the last edition with seven clubs as, from 1925 onwards, sixteen clubs would play in the competition.

== Qualified teams ==
The teams qualified through the regional championships:

Club	Qualified as
VfB Königsberg	Baltic champions
Sportfreunde Breslau	South Eastern German champions
BFC Alemannia 90	Brandenburg champion
SpVgg Leipzig	Central German champions
Hamburger SV	Northern German champions
Duisburger SpV	Western German champions
1. FC Nürnberg	Southern German champions

== Competition ==
=== Quarter-finals ===
The quarter-finals, played on 11 May 1924:

Team 1	Score	Team 2
BFC Alemannia 90	1–6	1. FC Nürnberg
Sportfreunde Breslau	0–3	Hamburger SV
SpVgg Leipzig	6–1	VfB Königsberg

- Duisburger SpV received a bye for the quarter-finals

=== Semi-finals ===
The semi-finals, played on 29 May 1924:

Team 1	Score	Team 2
1. FC Nürnberg	3–1	Duisburger SpV
Hamburger SV	1–0	SpVgg Leipzig

=== Final ===
9 June 1924
16:32 CET

1. FC Nürnberg	2–0	Hamburger SV
Hochgesang 30'; Strobel 87'	Report

Deutsches Stadion, Berlin
Attendance: 30,000
Referee: F. Seiler (Mittweida)

1. FC NÜRNBERG
GK	(Weimar Republic) Heinrich Stuhlfauth
RB	(Switzerland) Gustav Bark (c)
LB	(Weimar Republic) Anton Kugler
RH	(Weimar Republic) Hans Schmidt
CH	(Weimar Republic) Hans Kalb
LH	(Weimar Republic) Carl Riegel
OR	(Weimar Republic) Wolfgang Strobel
IR	(Weimar Republic) Ludwig Wieder
CF	(Weimar Republic) Georg Hochgesang
IL	(Weimar Republic) Heinrich Träg
OL	(Weimar Republic) Hans Sutor
Player-manager:
(Switzerland) Gustav Bark

HAMBURGER SV
GK	(Weimar Republic) Hans Martens
RB	(Weimar Republic) Albert Beier
LB	(Weimar Republic) Walter Risse
RH	(Weimar Republic) Hans Lang
CH	(Norway) Asbjørn Halvorsen
LH	(Weimar Republic) Hans Krohn
OR	(Weimar Republic) Walter Kolzen
IR	(Weimar Republic) Hugo Fick
CF	(Weimar Republic) Otto Harder (c)
IL	(Weimar Republic) Karl Schneider
OL	(Weimar Republic) Hans Rave
Manager:
(Weimar Republic) Rudi Agte
