= 1925 German football championship =

1925 German championship
Deutsche Fußballmeisterschaft
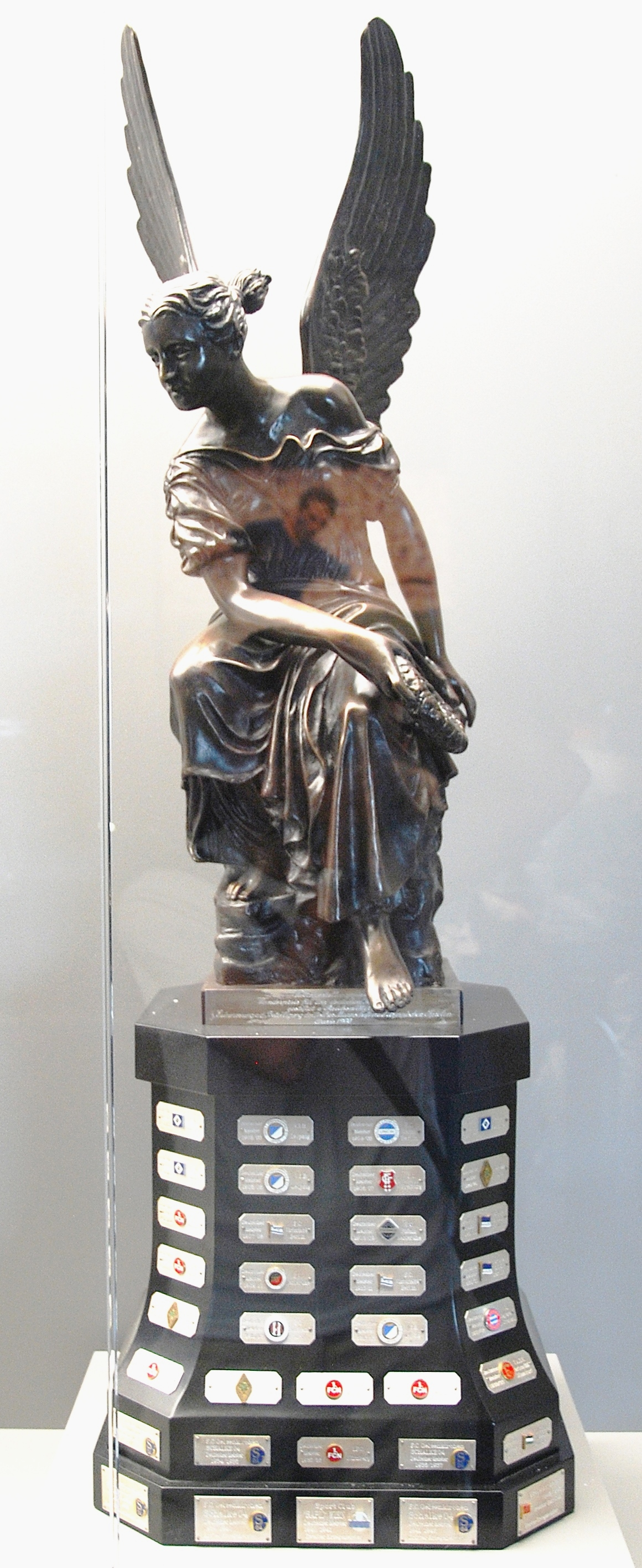
- Replica of the Viktoria trophy

Tournament details
- Country: Germany
- Dates: 3 May – 7 June
- Teams: 16

Final positions
- Champions: 1. FC Nürnberg; 4th German title
- Runners-up: FSV Frankfurt

Tournament statistics
- Matches played: 15
- Goals scored: 51 (3.4 per match)
- Top goal scorer(s): Georg Hochgesang; Willi Kirsei; Josef Lüke; Heinrich Träg; Arthur Warnecke (3 goals each)

The 1925 German football championship, the 18th edition of the competition, was won by 1. FC Nürnberg, defeating FSV Frankfurt 1–0 after extra time in the final.

For 1. FC Nürnberg it was the fourth national championship. It was part of Nuremberg's most successful era where the club won five titles in eight seasons from 1920 to 1927, missing out on a sixth one in the inconclusive 1922 championship. For FSV Frankfurt it was the club's sole German championship final appearance.

Five players were the joint top scorers of the 1925 championship with three goals each, Arthur Warnecke, Georg Hochgesang, Heinrich Träg, Josef Lüke and Willi Kirsei.

Sixteen club qualified for the knock-out competition, nine more than in previous seasons, two from each of the regional federations plus an additional third club from the South and West. In all cases the regional champions and runners-up qualified. In the West and South the third spot went to the third placed team of the championship.

== Qualified teams ==
The teams qualified through the regional championships:

Club	Qualified as
VfB Königsberg	Baltic champions
Titania Stettin	Baltic runners-up
Viktoria Forst	South Eastern German champions
Breslauer SC 08	South Eastern German runners-up
Hertha BSC	Brandenburg champion
BFC Alemannia 90	Brandenburg runners-up
VfB Leipzig	Central German champions
SV Jena	Central German runners-up
Hamburger SV	Northern German champions
Altonaer FC 93	Northern German runners-up
Duisburger SpV	Western German champions
Schwarz-Weiß Essen	Western German runners-up
TuRU Düsseldorf	Western German third placed team
VfR Mannheim	Southern German champions
1. FC Nürnberg	Southern German runners-up
FSV Frankfurt	Southern German additional qualifier

== Competition ==
=== Round of 16 ===
The round of 16, played on 3 May 1925:

Team 1	Score	Team 2
BFC Alemannia 90	1–2	Duisburger SpV
1. FC Nürnberg	2–0	FV Jena
Hamburger SV	1–2 aet	FSV Frankfurt
Titania Stettin	2–4	Altonaer FC 93
TuRU Düsseldorf	4–1	VfR Mannheim
VfB Königsberg	2–3 aet	Hertha BSC
VfB Leipzig	1–2	SC Breslau 08
Viktoria Forst	1–2	Schwarz-Weiß Essen

=== Quarter-finals ===
The quarter-finals, played on 17 May 1925:

Team 1	Score	Team 2
Altonaer FC 93	0–2	Duisburger SpV
SC Breslau 08	1–4	1. FC Nürnberg
Schwarz-Weiß Essen	1–3	FSV Frankfurt
Hertha BSC	4–1	TuRU Düsseldorf

=== Semi-finals ===
The semi-finals, played on 24 May 1925:

Team 1	Score	Team 2
Duisburger SpV	0–3	1. FC Nürnberg
FSV Frankfurt	1–0 aet	Hertha BSC

=== Final ===
7 June 1925
c. 16:05 CET

FSV Frankfurt	0–1 (a.e.t.)	1. FC Nürnberg
	Report	Wieder 108'

Waldstadion, Frankfurt
Attendance: 40,000
Referee: W. Guyenz (Essen)

FSV FRANKFURT
GK	(Weimar Republic) Jean Koch
RB	(Weimar Republic) Adolf Reitz (c)
LB	(Weimar Republic) Bebe Heinig
RH	(Weimar Republic) August Henß
CH	(Switzerland) Robert Pache
LH	(Weimar Republic) Georg Völler
OR	(Weimar Republic) Reinhold Strehlke
IR	(Weimar Republic) Ludwig Gattermann
CF	(Weimar Republic) Johannes Klumpp
IL	(Weimar Republic) Arno Strehlke
OL	(Weimar Republic) Otto Waldschmidt
Player-manager:
(Switzerland) Robert Pache

1. FC NÜRNBERG
GK	(Weimar Republic) Heinrich Stuhlfauth
RB	(Weimar Republic) Luitpold Popp
LB	(Weimar Republic) Anton Kugler
RH	(Weimar Republic) Hans Schmidt
CH	(Weimar Republic) Hans Kalb
LH	(Weimar Republic) Carl Riegel (c)
OR	(Weimar Republic) Wolfgang Strobel
IR	(Weimar Republic) Ludwig Wieder
CF	(Weimar Republic) Georg Hochgesang
IL	(Weimar Republic) Heinrich Träg
OL	(Weimar Republic) Hans Sutor
Manager:
(Hungary) Dori Kürschner
