= 1921 German football championship =

1921 German championship
Deutsche Fußballmeisterschaft
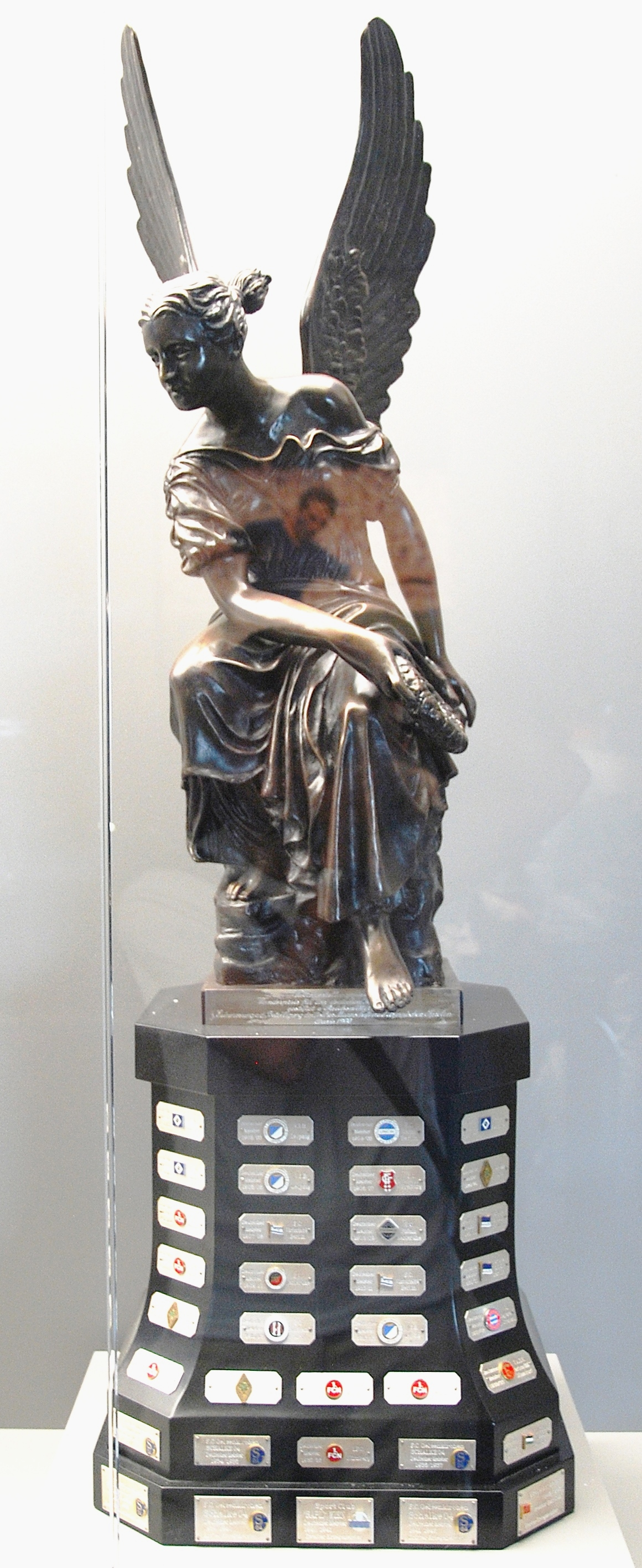
- Replica of the Viktoria trophy

Tournament details
- Country: Germany
- Dates: 22 May – 12 June
- Teams: 7

Final positions
- Champions: 1. FC Nürnberg; 2nd German title
- Runners-up: BFC Vorwärts 90

Tournament statistics
- Matches played: 6
- Goals scored: 23 (3.83 per match)
- Top goal scorer: Luitpold Popp (5 goals)

The 1921 German football championship, the 14th edition of the competition, was won by 1. FC Nürnberg, defeating BFC Vorwärts 90 5–0 in the final.

For 1. FC Nürnberg it was the second national championship, having won the competition in the previous season as well. Nuremberg thereby became the first team to successfully defend their title. It was part of Nuremberg's most successful era where the club won five titles in eight seasons from 1920 to 1927, missing out on a sixth one in the inconclusive 1922 championship. For Vorwärts Berlin it marked the club's sole German championship final. The club, being unrelated to the East German club ASK Vorwärts Berlin, later merged with 1905 champions Union 92 Berlin to form SpVgg Blau-Weiß 1890 Berlin.

Nuremberg's Luitpold Popp was the top scorer of the 1921 championship with five goals.

Seven clubs qualified for the knock-out competition, nominally the champions of each of the seven regional football championships. However, the Baltic championship was later awarded to a different club, the VfB Königsberg.

== Qualified teams ==
The teams qualified through the regional championships:

Club	Qualified as
Stettiner SC	Baltic championship representative
Sportfreunde Breslau	South Eastern German champions
BFC Vorwärts 90	Brandenburg champion
Wacker Halle	Central German champions
Hamburger SV	Northern German champions
Duisburger SpV	Western German champions
1. FC Nürnberg	Southern German champions

== Competition ==
=== Quarter-finals ===
The quarter-finals, played on 22 May 1921:

Team 1	Score	Team 2
Duisburger SpV	2–1	Hamburger SV
Sportfreunde Breslau	1–2	Wacker Halle
SC Stettin	1–2	BFC Vorwärts 90

- 1. FC Nürnberg received a bye for the quarter-finals

=== Semi-finals ===
The semi-finals, played on 29 May 1921:

Team 1	Score	Team 2
Wacker Halle	1–5	1. FC Nürnberg
BFC Vorwärts 90	2–1	Duisburger SpV

=== Final ===
12 June 1921
16:08 CET

1. FC Nürnberg	5–0	BFC Vorwärts 90
Popp 13', 76', 87'; Träg 14', 35'	Report

Sport-Club 1899-Platz, Düsseldorf
Attendance: 27,000
Referee: P. Bauwens (Cologne)

1. FC NÜRNBERG
GK	(Weimar Republic) Heinrich Stuhlfauth
RB	(Switzerland) Gustav Bark (c)
LB	(Weimar Republic) Anton Kugler
RH	(Weimar Republic) Michael Grünerwald
CH	(Weimar Republic) Hans Kalb
LH	(Weimar Republic) Carl Riegel
OR	(Weimar Republic) Wolfgang Strobel
IR	(Weimar Republic) Luitpold Popp
CF	(Weimar Republic) Willy Böß
IL	(Weimar Republic) Heinrich Träg
OL	(Weimar Republic) Hans Sutor
Manager:
(Hungary) Izidor Kürschner

BFC VORWÄRTS 90
GK	(Weimar Republic) Albert Weber
RB	(Weimar Republic) Walter Probst
LB	(Weimar Republic) Walter Fritzsche
RH	(Weimar Republic) A. Rotkehl
CH	(Weimar Republic) Karl Hüttig (c?)
LH	(Weimar Republic) Willy Puls
OR	(Weimar Republic) Erich Kretschmann
IR	(Weimar Republic) Wilhelm Hoffmann
CF	(Weimar Republic) Hermann Paul
IL	(Weimar Republic) Karl Wolter
OL	(Weimar Republic) Georg Schumann
Manager:
(Weimar Republic) Becker
