= 1928 German football championship =

1928 German championship
Deutsche Fußballmeisterschaft
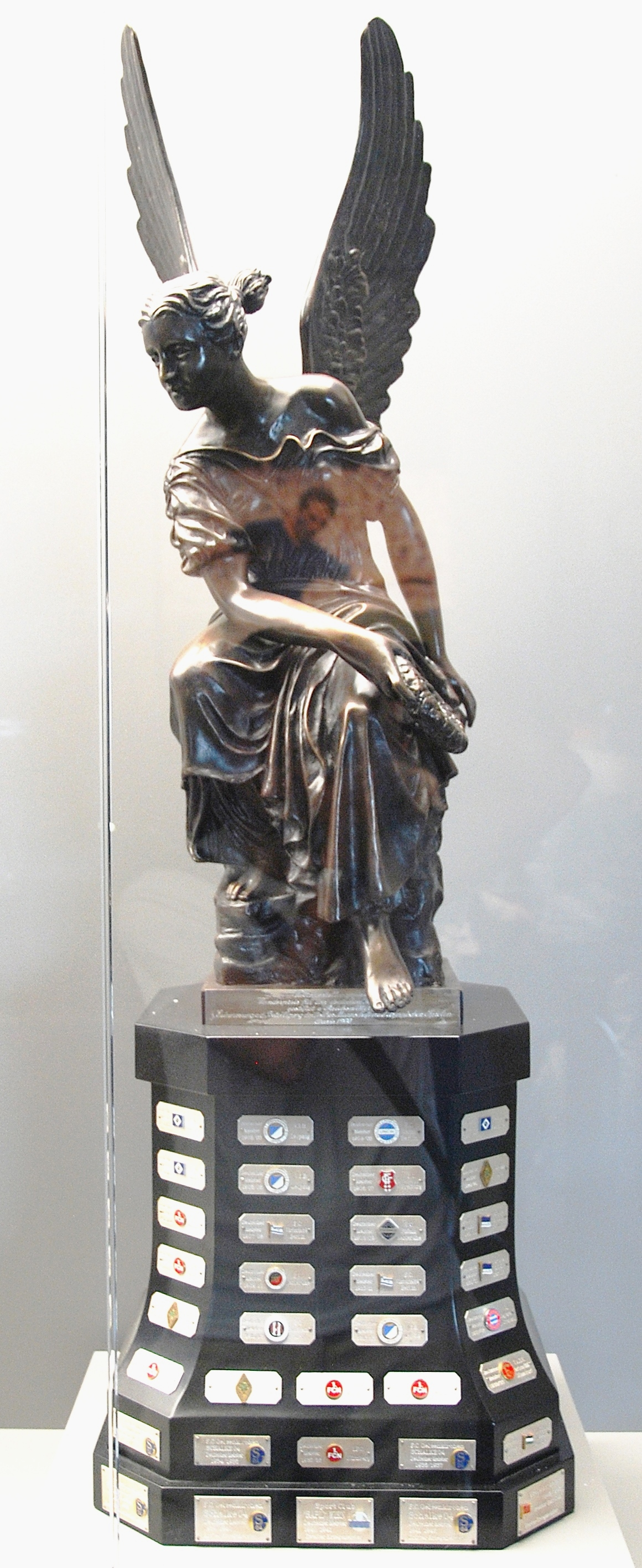
- Replica of the Viktoria trophy

Tournament details
- Country: Germany
- Dates: 8–29 July
- Teams: 16

Final positions
- Champions: Hamburger SV; 2nd German title
- Runner-up: Hertha BSC

Tournament statistics
- Matches played: 15
- Goals scored: 75 (5 per match)
- Top goal scorer(s): Hans Grenzel; Otto Harder (7 goals each)

The 1928 German football championship, the 21st edition of the competition, was won by Hamburger SV, defeating Hertha BSC, 5–2, in the final.

For Hamburger SV it was the second national championship after its first in 1923, not counting the 1922 title which the club declined. It brought to an end Hamburg's successful era during the 1920s with four appearances in the German final in seven seasons. Hamburger SV would not play in a final again until 1957 and win its next championship three years later, in 1960. For Hertha BSC it marked the third consecutive final loss, a series the club would extend to four in the following season. Hertha would then go on to win back-to-back championships in 1930 and 1931.

Hertha's Hans Grenzel and Hamburg's Tull Harder were the joint top scorer of the 1928 championship with seven goals each.

Sixteen clubs qualified for the knock-out competition, two from each of the regional federations plus an additional third club from the South and West. In all cases the regional champions and runners-up qualified. In the West the third spot went to the third-placed team of the championship while, in the South, the third spot was determined in a separate qualifying competition for runners-up and third-placed teams.

== Qualified teams ==
The teams qualified through the regional championships:

Club	Qualified as
VfB Königsberg	Baltic champions
Preußen Stettin	Baltic runners-up
Breslauer SC 08	South Eastern German champions
Sportfreunde Breslau	South Eastern German runners-up
Hertha BSC	Brandenburg champion
Tennis Borussia Berlin	Brandenburg runners-up
Wacker Halle	Central German champions
Dresdner SC	Central German runners-up
Hamburger SV	Northern German champions
Holstein Kiel	Northern German runners-up
SpVgg Sülz 07	Western German champions
Preußen Krefeld	Western German runners-up
Schalke 04	Western German third placed team
FC Bayern Munich	Southern German champions
Eintracht Frankfurt	Southern German runners-up
FC Wacker München	Southern German additional qualifier

== Competition ==
=== Round of 16 ===
The round of 16, played on 8 July 1928:

Team 1	Score	Team 2
Hamburger SV	4–2	Schalke 04
Hertha BSC	7–0	Sportfreunde Breslau
Preussen Stettin	1–4	Holstein Kiel
SpVgg Sülz 07	3–1	Eintracht Frankfurt
Preussen Krefeld	1–3	Tennis Borussia Berlin
SC Breslau 08	2–3	VfB Königsberg
Wacker Halle	0–3	FC Bayern Munich
FC Wacker München	1–0	Dresdner SC

=== Quarter-finals ===
The quarter finals, played on 12 July 1928:

Team 1	Score	Team 2
FC Bayern Munich	5–2	SpVgg Sülz 07
VfB Königsberg	0–4	Hamburger SV
Holstein Kiel	0–4	Hertha BSC
Tennis Borussia Berlin	1–4	FC Wacker München

=== Semi-finals ===
The semi-finals, played on 22 July 1928:

Team 1	Score	Team 2
Hamburger SV	8–2	FC Bayern Munich
Hertha BSC	2–1	FC Wacker München

=== Final ===
The final, played on 29 July 1928:

Team 1	Score	Team 2
Hamburger SV	5–2	Hertha BSC
