= Hans Lang =

Hans Lang may refer to:

- Hans Lang (German composer) (1897-1968), music teacher
- Hans Lang (Austrian composer) (1908-1992), composer of light music, film music and Viennese songs
- Hans Lang (footballer) (1899-1943), German international footballer
