= Georg Schumann =

Georg Schumann may refer to:

- Georg Schumann (composer) (1866–1952), German composer
- Georg Schumann (footballer), German international footballer
- Georg Schumann (resistance fighter) (1886–1945), German resistance fighter against the Nazi régime
