= Askania Forst =

German football club

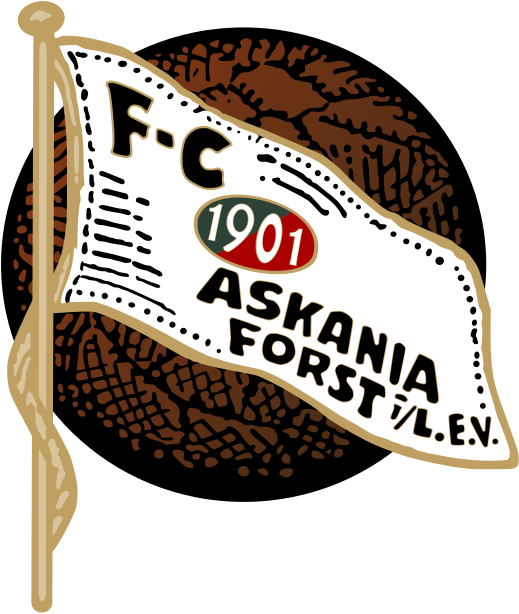
- Full name: Fußballclub Askania e.V. Forst
- Founded: 1901
- Dissolved: 1945
- Capacity: Askania-Platz Heidestraße
Home colours	Away colours

Askania Forst was a German association football club in what was the city of Forst (Lausitz), Brandenburg and is today Zasieki, Poland. Established in 1901, the team earned a number of championships in the 1910s, but disappeared from top flight German football after 1920.

== History ==
Fußballclub Askania Forst first came to prominence in the 1909–10 season, advancing to the regional Südostdeutschland final where they were beaten 1:3 by VfR Breslau.

The following year, Askania again advanced to the final and this time came away victorious with a 3:2 win over Germania Breslau. The result stood despite a protest by the Breslauer side and Askania moved on to the opening round of the national championship where they were put out (2:3) by eventual finalists VfB Leipzig.

Forst won its second title in 1913 in a playoff contested as much off the pitch as on. After beating Preußen Görlitz in qualifying, Forst defeated Preußen Breslau 2:1 and moved on to the final after Breslau's protest was denied. In the title match Askania was beaten 1:2 by Preußen Kattowitz but filed a protest of their own, which was successful. In the rematch they reversed the earlier result and came away as Südostdeutschland champions with a 4:0 win. In national quarterfinal play Forst was again put out by VfB Leipzig who would advance to the national final once more, but this time come away as German champions.

In the final season before regular competition was interrupted by World War I, Forst won the last of its three regional titles. After solid victories over DSV Posen (6:0) and Preußen Görlitz (9:0), they defeated Vereinigte Breslauer Sportfreunde 3:1. In German championship play they were eliminated in the quarterfinals by BBC 03 Berlin.

Once domestic competition resumed after the war, Forst made one more appearance in the Südostdeutschland playoffs and bowed out 0:1 to Vereinigte Breslauer Sportfreunde in a semifinal match. The team continued to compete through the interwar period, but was lost in the aftermath of World War II.

== Honours ==
- South Eastern German champions (3): 1911, 1913, 1914
