= Karl Auer =

Karl Auer may refer to:

- Karl Auer (SS officer) (1916–1997), Knight's Cross of the Iron Cross recipient
- Karl Auer (footballer) (1903–1945), German footballer
