= Ernst Müller =

Ernst Müller may refer to:

- Ernst Müller (boxer) (born 1954), German boxer
- Ernst Müller (footballer) (1901–1958), German footballer
