= Preußen Breslau =

German football club

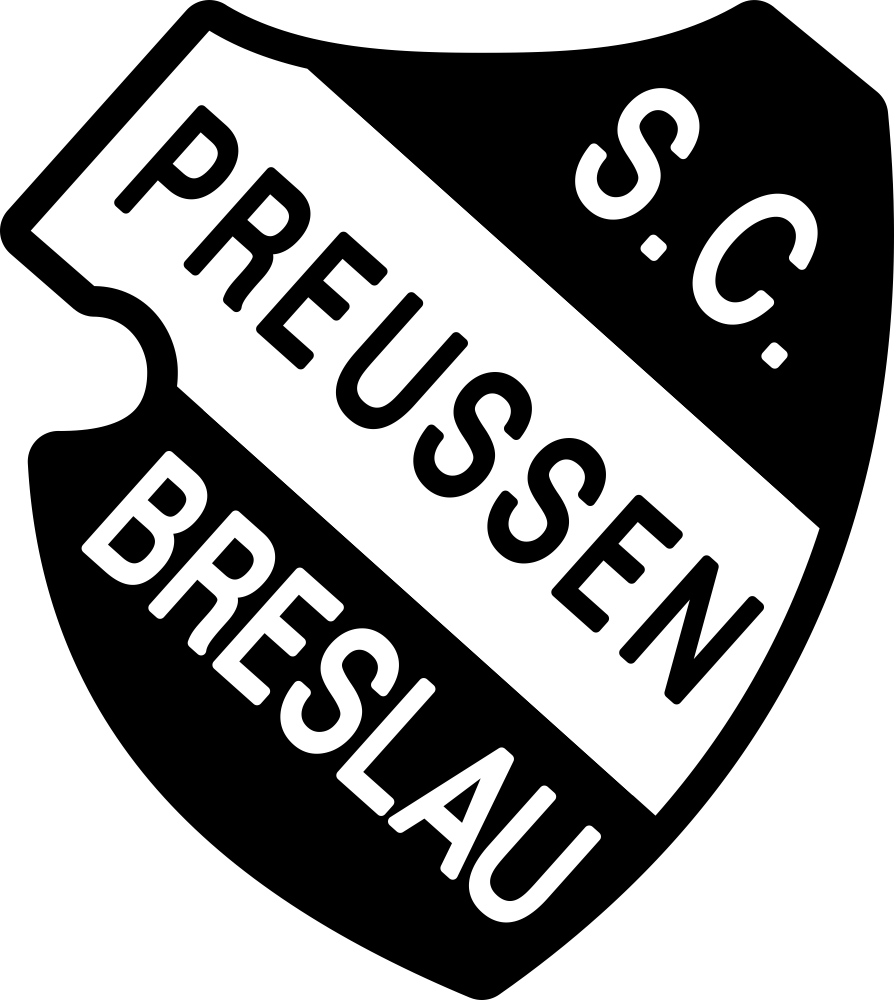
- Full name: Sport-Club Preußen Breslau
- Founded: 1902
- 2007–08: defunct

SC Preußen Breslau was a German association football club from the city of Breslau, Province of Silesia (today Wrocław, Poland). The club was briefly part of the top flight regional Südostdeutscher Fußball-Verband (SOFV, en:Southeast German Football Association) in the early 1900s.

Established 15 December 1902 the team made its only appearance in the playoffs at the end of the 1912–13 season. They beat Britannia Posen 1:0 in qualifying play before facing Askania Forst in a semifinal contest. They lost the match 1–2 and then protested the result. The match was replayed, but Forst again came away as 2:1 winners.

After World War I Preußen disappeared as a separate side when they joined Verein Breslauer Sportfreunde (previously SC 1904 Breslau) to form Vereinigte Breslauer Sportfreunde. The combined club continued to play until 1933 until they merged again.

Camillo Ugi represented Preußen on the Germany national team, earning a single cap before leaving in 1909 for VfB Leipzig where he would earn another 14 caps.
