= Fiederer =

Fiederer is a German-language occupational surname analogous to the English "Fletcher". It may refer to:

- Hans Fiederer (1920–1980), German international footballer
- Leo Fiederer (1897–1946), German international footballer
