= SV Stern Breslau =

German football club

- Full name: Sportverein Stern Breslau
- Founded: 1920
- Dissolved: 1933
- Ground: Mochbern
Home colours	Away colours

Stern Breslau was a German association football club from the city of Breslau, Lower Silesia (today Wrocław, Poland). It was established in 1920 as the workers' club BSG Großmarkhalle Breslau and by 1921 was playing as Sportverein Stern Breslau. It was part of the Arbeiter-Turn- und Sportbund, (ATSB or en:Workers Gymnastics and Sports Federation), a leftist national sports organization which organized a football competition and championship separate from that of the DFB (Deutscher Fußball Bund, en:German Football Association). Stern is notable as the losing side in the 1924 league final where they were beaten by Dresdner SV 10 6:1. This was the first of four consecutive titles for the Dresden club.

In 1933, workers' and faith-based teams were banned by the Nazis as politically undesirable. The membership of Stern reorganized itself as 1. Fußball Club Breslau which went on to play a single season in the top-flight regional Gauliga Niederschlesien in 1938–39. 1. FC disappeared following World War II when the city became part of Poland.
