= STC Görlitz =

German football club

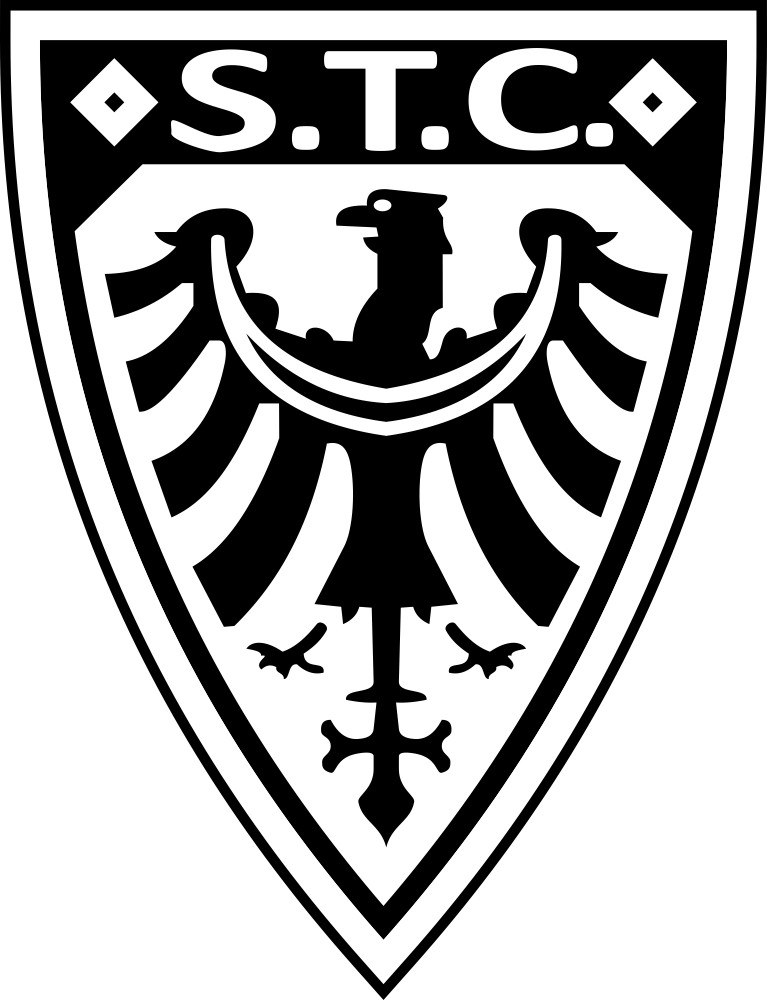
- Full name: Sport- und Turn-Club Görlitz
- Founded: 1906
- Dissolved: 1945
| Home colours | Away colours |

STC Görlitz was a German association football club from the city of Görlitz, Silesia (today: Saxony). The club was established as Sportclub Preußen Görlitz in 1906.

== History ==
SC Preußen played in the top-flight regional Südostdeutscher Fußballverband (SOFV, en:Southeast German Football Association) and while they made a string of league playoff appearances from 1911 to 1914, they were unable to advance out of the opening qualifying round except in 1914 when they got as far as the semifinals where they were resoundingly trounced by Askania Forst (0:9) who were on their way to the league championship.

Domestic competition was disrupted throughout Germany from 1914 to 1918 by World War I. The SOFV was most seriously affected of the country's various regional leagues and did not resume play until the 1919–20 season. In 1918, Preußen adopted the name Sport- und Turn-Club Görlitz and in 1920–21 reappeared in SOFV play. They again quickly went out, this time to Vereinigte Breslauer Sportfreunde (1:6), before disappearing into lower-level competition. STC made a single season cameo in the top-flight in 1928–29 before slipping away again.

German football was reorganized in 1933 under the Third Reich into 16 regional first class divisions and Görlitz became part of the Gauliga Schlesien. They finished in last place and were immediately relegated. The team won its way back to the Gauliga in 1939 but voluntarily withdrew before the season opened. Play in the SOFV was again disrupted by war and as travel became more difficult competition became more local in character. The Gauliga Schlesien was first broken up into the Gauliga Oberschlesien (I) and Gauliga Niederschlesien (I). By the 1943–44 season, the Gauliga Niederschlesien was in turn split into five divisions and STC finished poorly in the Gauliga Görlitz in a campaign of only 5 matches. Following the end of the war in 1945 the club disappeared.

== Stadium ==
STC played its home matches in the Schenkendorfplatz (capacity 4,000) or the Süd-Sportplatz.
