= Britannia Posen =

German football club

FC Britannia Posen
- Full name: Fußball-Club Britannia 1905 Posen
- Short name: Britannia Posen
- Founded: 1 April 1905
- Dissolved: c.1920
- League: South Eastern German football championship
Home colors

FC Britannia Posen was a German association football club from the City of Posen, in the German Reich. The short-lived club was established sometime within the first decade of the 20th century and lost in 1920 under the Polish rule.

== History ==
Britannia joined the top-flight regional Südostdeutscher Fußballverband (SOFV, en:Southeast German Football Association) as the league grew to include Posen in 1909. The club made just a single appearance in the playoffs in 1912–13 when they were eliminated 1:0 in the qualifying round to Preußen Breslau. The following season the team lost the district Niederschlesien final 3:4 to DSV Posen.

Football competitions in many parts of Germany were disrupted between 1914 and 1918 by World War I. The country was in disorder following its defeat in the conflict and an uprising succeeded in restoring an independent Polish republic built around Poznań, which was the historic center of the country.

Competition in the SOFV was greatly reduced, but was resumed in the 1919–20 season. Play in the Posen district circuit collapsed and they did not send a representative to the regional playoffs. Britannia was one of many German football clubs in the area that was lost at the time.

== Honours ==
Posen Football Championship

- Champions: 1912–13
