= Georg Hochgesang =

German footballer and manager

Personal information
- Full name: Georg Hochgesang
- Date of birth: 3 November 1897
- Place of birth: Nuremberg, German Empire
- Date of death: 12 June 1988 (aged 90)
- Place of death: Düsseldorf, West Germany
- Height: 1.65 m (5 ft 5 in)
- Position: Forward

Youth career
- 1905–: Pfeil Nuremberg

Senior career*
Years	Team	Apps	(Gls)
–1921	Pfeil Nuremberg		
1921–1928	1. FC Nürnberg	259	
1928–1933	Fortuna Düsseldorf		

International career
1924–1927	Germany	6	(4)

Managerial career
- 1933–1934: BV 08 Lüttringhausen
- 1934: Hamburger SV
- –1938: Germania Bochum
- 1938–: VfL Bochum
- 1946–1948: Fortuna Düsseldorf
- * Club domestic league appearances and goals

Georg Hochgesang (3 November 1897 – 12 June 1988) was a German football forward, who played for 1. FC Nürnberg and Fortuna Düsseldorf, and manager. He also represented the Germany national team, winning six caps and scoring four goals between 1924 and 1927.

== Honours ==
- German football championship: 1924, 1925, 1927, 1933
