= 1. FC Breslau =

German football club

- Full name: Erster Fußball-Club e.V. Breslau
- Founded: 1932
- Dissolved: 1945
Home colours	Away colours

1. FC Breslau was a German association football club from the city of Breslau, Province of Silesia (today Wrocław, Poland). It was established by the former membership of SV Stern Breslau, a workers' club that had been banned by the Nazis in 1933 alongside other left-leaning and faith-based clubs. Stern was notable as the losing side in the 1924 title match of the Arbeiter-Turn- und Sportbund, (ATSB or en:Workers Gymnastics and Sports Federation), a leftist national sports organization which organized a football competition and championship separate from that of the DFB (Deutscher Fußball Bund, en:German Football Association).

1. FC played in the regional top flight Gauliga Schlesien in 1938–39 and the Gauliga Niederschlesien in 1939–40. After the end of World War II, Breslau became part of Poland and all German football clubs were dissolved.
