= Josef Müller (footballer) =

German footballer

Personal information
- Date of birth: 6 May 1893
- Place of birth: Würzburg, Germany
- Date of death: 22 March 1984 (aged 90)
- Position: Defender

Senior career*
| Years | Team | Apps | (Gls) |
| 1911–1921 | Phönix Ludwigshafen | | |
| 1921–1927 | SpVgg Fürth | 114 | (1) |
| 1927–1932 | FV 04 Würzburg | | |
| 1932–1935 | Werder Bremen | | |

International career
| 1921–1928 | Germany | 12 | (0) |

Managerial career
- FV 04 Würzburg
- Werder Bremen
- IG Farben Heidelberg
- Bremer Sportfreunde
- 1937–1938: FC St. Pauli
- ASV Blumenthal
- TSG Ludwigshafen
- VfR Mannheim
- 1947–1948: Stuttgarter Kickers
- 1950–1952: TuRa Ludwigshafen
- SV Dudweiler
- SV Bad Dürkheim
- * Club domestic league appearances and goals

Josef Müller (6 May 1893 – 22 March 1984) was a German international footballer and coach.

== Career ==
In 1926 his club SpVgg Fürth was crowned German football champion. In the final Müller's team beat Hertha BSC 4–1 in Frankfurt.

Müller won 12 caps with the Germany national team between September 1921 and April 1928. He was also part of Germany's team at the 1928 Summer Olympics, but he did not play in any matches.
