= SV Ratibor 03 =

German football club

- Full name: Sportvereinigung Ratibor 1903 e.V.
- Founded: 1903
- Dissolved: 1945
| Home colours | Away colours |

SV Ratibor was a German association football club from the city of Ratibor, Upper Silesia (today Racibórz, Poland). It was the first football club established in Upper Silesia and remained active until 1945.

The club was established in 1903 by Fritz Seidl as Fußball Club Ratibor and in 1906 became part of the Upper Silesian division (Bezirk Oberschlesien) of the Southeast German Football Association. In 1911, the team took on the name Sportvereinigung Ratibor.

During the interwar period, Ratibor was in and out of regional first class competition with their best result coming as a second-place finish in 1931. In 1933, German football was reorganized under the Third Reich into sixteen top-flight divisions and Ratibor became part of the Gauliga Schlesien. SV's best finish (4th) came in the 1933–34 season, and just three campaigns later the team was relegated. They made a single appearance in the Tschammerpokal tournament, predecessor to today's DFB-Pokal (German Cup), in 1937. Ratibor returned to first division play in 1938 and later withdrew after playing just four matches of the 1939–40 Gauliga Oberschlesien (I) season when they could not field a team due to lack of players. The team disappeared with the end of World War II.
