= Germania Breslau =

German association football club

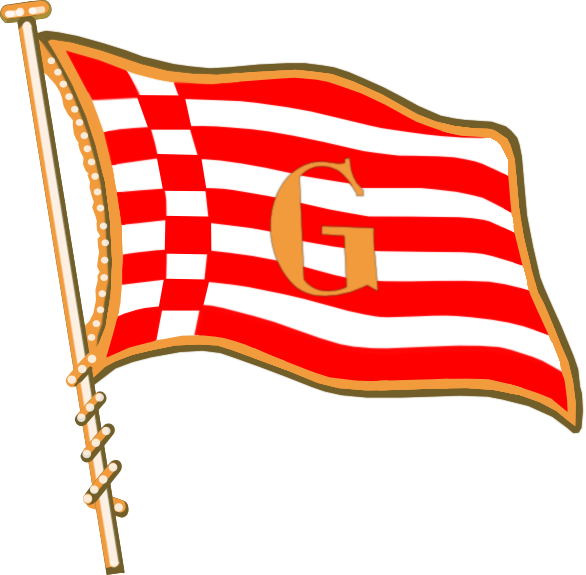
- Full name: Sport-Club Germania 1904 e.V. Breslau
- Founded: 1904
- Ground: Sportplatz Grüneiche
- 2007–08: defunct
Home colours	Away colours

SC Germania Breslau was a German association football club from the city of Breslau, Province of Silesia (today Wrocław, Poland). The team spent several seasons in upper tier regional play in the Südostdeutscher Fußball-Verband (Southeast German Football Association) and advanced to the league playoffs in 1911 and 1912.

In both appearances Germania advanced to the league final. A 2–3 loss in 1911 to Askania Forst was annulled after protest, but the team then also lost the rematch (0–3). In the following season's final they were beaten 1–5 by ATV Liegnitz. In 1913 the team merged with Preußen Breslau to form Vereinigte Breslauer Sportfreunde.
