= BV Altenessen =

- Full name: Ballspiel-Verein Altenessen von 1906 e.V.
- Founded: 1906; 119 years ago
- Ground: Am Kaiserpark
- League: Kreisliga A Essen (VIII)
- 2015–16: 5th
Home colours	Away colours

BV Altenessen is a German football club from the city of Essen, North Rhine-Westphalia. It was established 6 May 1906 and had short turns as a first division side prior to World War II.

== History ==
BV first came to note through a 1926 national round playoff appearance after a second-place result in the regional top flight play in the Westdeutschland league. They were quickly eliminated by FSV Frankfurt (1–2) in an eighth-final contest.

In 1933 they merged briefly with Essener Sport-Club Preußen 1902 and played a single season as BV Preußen Altenessen in the Gauliga Niederrhein, one of 16 regional first division circuits created in the reorganization of German football under the Third Reich that year. Preußen was relegated after a 10th-place finish and the union of the two clubs ended. After a title win in the Bezirksliga Niederrhein (II) in 1937 followed by a successful promotion round playoff, BV rejoined Gauliga play. Their 1937–38 campaign ended in relegation after another 10th-place finish. As World War II progressed domestic competition suffered from manpower shortages and difficult travel. Many teams were merged into wartime sides known as Kriegspielgemeinshaft and in October 1943 BV joined Rot-Weiß Essen to form KSG RWE/BV 06 Essen which played as Ballfreunde Bergeborbeck after 1944. The combined side played lower tier local ball until war's end.

The two clubs resumed their separate identities after the conflict and became part of the Landesliga Niederrhein (III) in 1947. Over the course of the next three decades BV remained a mid to lower table side in third and fourth tier competition with their best result coming as a 6th-place finish in 1973. Through the 1980s and 1990s the club slowly faded from view as they slipped to 5th and 6th division play. After the turn of the millennium BV descended to the Kreisliga and played in the Kreisliga B (IX). It won a league championship at this level in 2015 and returned to the Kreisliga A.
