= Emil Köpplinger =

German footballer

Personal information
- Date of birth: 19 December 1897
- Date of death: 29 July 1988 (aged 90)
- Position: Midfielder

Senior career*
Years	Team	Apps	(Gls)
- 1. FC Nürnberg

International career
1927	Germany	1	(0)
- * Club domestic league appearances and goals

Emil Köpplinger (19 December 1897 – 29 July 1988) was a German international footballer.
