= Josef Lüke =

German footballer

Personal information
- Date of birth: 13 March 1899
- Date of death: 1948
- Position: Forward

Senior career*
Years	Team	Apps	(Gls)
- TuRU Düsseldorf

International career
1923	Germany	2	(0)
- * Club domestic league appearances and goals

Josef Lüke (13 March 1899 – 1948) was a German international footballer.
