= Karl Wolter =

German footballer

Personal information
- Date of birth: 2 August 1894
- Date of death: 19 April 1959 (aged 64)
- Position: Forward

Senior career*
Years	Team	Apps	(Gls)
- Vorwärts Berlin

International career
1912–1921	Germany	3	(0)
- * Club domestic league appearances and goals

Karl Wolter (2 August 1894 – 19 April 1959) was a German international footballer.
