= Camillo Ugi =

German footballer (1884–1970)

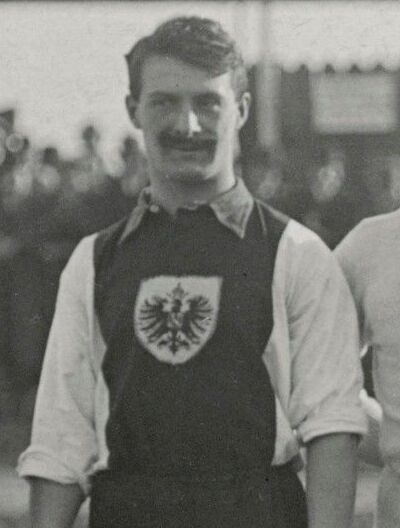
- Ugi in 1910

Personal information
- Date of birth: 21 December 1884
- Place of birth: Leipzig, German Empire
- Date of death: 9 May 1970 (aged 85)
- Place of death: Markkleeberg, East Germany
- Position: Forward

Senior career*
Years	Team	Apps	(Gls)
1902–1905	Leipziger Ballspielclub 1893		
1905	Sport Club Germânia		
1906	VfB Leipzig		
1910–1911	VfB Leipzig		
1911	Stade Helvétique de Marseille		
1913–1915	VfB Leipzig		

International career
1908–1912	Germany	15	(1)
Medal record
Gold medal – first place	1912 Stockholm
- * Club domestic league appearances and goals

Camillo Ugi (21 December 1884 – 9 May 1970) was a German footballer who played as a forward, competing in the 1912 Summer Olympics. In the main he played for his hometown club VfB Leipzig with which he won a national championship, but had numerous stints with other clubs in three countries on two continents.

== Football career ==
Between 1908 and 1912 Ugi was called up 15 times to play for Germany during his time with VfB Leipzig, Vereinigte Breslauer Sportfreunde in today's Wrocław and FSV Frankfurt and captained the team on nine occasions. He scored one goal. Ugi was a member of the German Olympic squad 1912. The midfielder also was part of the side that defeated Russia in the consolation tournament 16–0, which still is the record win for Germany.

Ugi started participating in the German gymnastics movement aged 14, but soon found interest in the then new game of football. In 1902 he joined Leipziger Ballspielclub 1893, one of the first football clubs in Leipzig. In 1905 the trained electrical mechanic, specialising in cinema equipment, was lured by career prospects to join Sport Club Germânia, today's EC Pinheiros in São Paulo, Brazil. After a few months he returned to Germany, as his language skills proved insufficient to meet his vocational ambitions.

Back in Germany he joined VfB Leipzig for the first time, a club he should be with for the majority of his years, albeit with several interruptions. He won with the VfB the German Championship of 1906, which should remain his sole title. With the VfB he reached another championship final in 1911, losing it to Viktoria Berlin. In his long career he played amongst others also for Dresdner SC, FSV Frankfurt, Vereinigte Breslauer Sportfreunde. In 1911 he played briefly for the now extinct club Stade Helvétique Marseille in France, where he was taken aback by the conditions; a wooden cabin to change was all on offer. Often he changed clubs in order to follow career prospects. He ended his playing career in the mid-1920s in Leipzig.

== Life after football ==
After this his attempts to attain paid positions as coach or sports teacher remained unsuccessful. On the other side, with the cinematographic equipment manufacturer he worked, he swiftly obtained promotion to operations manager. After World War II he worked for a medical equipment manufacturer in the then East Germany. Ugi, who married in 1921 had three daughters. Already in the early 1950s he suffered a heart attack. After retirement in 1954 he continued to attend matches of 1. FC Lokomotive Leipzig, the successor to VfB after the war, and eagerly followed the matches of both German national sides.

He died in Markkleeberg in 9 May 1970, aged 85.

== Titles ==
- German Championship: 1906
