= Willy Ascherl =

German footballer

Personal information
- Date of birth: 7 January 1902
- Place of birth: Fürth, Germany
- Date of death: 8 August 1929 (aged 27)
- Place of death: Meißen, Germany
- Position: Striker

Youth career
- –1918: SpVgg Fürth

Senior career*
Years	Team	Apps	(Gls)
1918–1922	TV 1860 Fürth		
1922–1928	SpVgg Fürth	105	(60)
1928–1929	Meißner SV 08		

International career
1924	Germany	1	(0)
- * Club domestic league appearances and goals

Willy Ascherl (7 January 1902 – 8 August 1929) was a German international footballer.
