= Viktor Hierländer =

Austrian footballer and manager

Personal information
- Date of birth: 7 June 1900
- Place of birth: Vienna, Austria-Hungary
- Date of death: 20 January 1982 (aged 81)
- Position: Striker

Senior career*
Years	Team	Apps	(Gls)
1915–1919	Floridsdorfer AC		
1919–1922	SpVgg Fürth	32	(31)
1922–1923	TSV Schwaben Augsburg		
1923	FC Bayern Munich		
1923–1927	FK Austria Wien		
1927	New York Giants	21	(10)
1927–1928	Wiener AC		

International career
1925–1928	Austria	5	(3)

Managerial career
- 1929–1931: Cracovia
- 1931–1932: BSC Young Boys
- 1932–1935: Olympic Alexandria
- 1935–1938: Admira Wien
- 1938–1940: Turkey (coach)
- 1941: German team of Bohemia and Moravia
- 1952: Austria (Amateur)
- 1954–1955: SK Rapid Wien
- 1966–1967: Austria (Amateur)
- * Club domestic league appearances and goals

Viktor Hierländer (7 June 1900 – 20 January 1982) was an Austrian football player and manager.

He played for Floridsdorfer AC, SpVgg Fürth, FK Austria Wien, New York Giants and Wiener AC.

He coached Cracovia, BSC Young Boys, Alexandria, Admira Wien, Austria (Amateur, most notably at the 1952 Summer Olympics) and SK Rapid Wien.
