= Carl Riegel =

German footballer

Personal information
- Full name: Carl Riegel
- Date of birth: 6 January 1897
- Place of birth: Germany
- Date of death: 26 November 1970 (aged 73)
- Position: Midfielder

Senior career*
Years	Team	Apps	(Gls)
1914–1925	1. FC Nürnberg		

International career
1920–1923	Germany	7	(0)
- * Club domestic league appearances and goals

Carl Riegel (6 January 1897 – 26 November 1970) was a German football midfielder who played for 1. FC Nürnberg.

Riegel joined Nürnberg in 1914 and went on to win four German football championships with the club. He was also capped seven times by the Germany national team between 1920 and 1923.

== Honours ==
- German football championship: 1920, 1921, 1924, 1925
