= Otto Montag =

German footballer

Personal information
- Date of birth: 12 October 1897
- Date of death: 23 December 1973 (aged 76)
- Position: Forward

Senior career*
Years	Team	Apps	(Gls)
- Norden-Nordwest Berlin

International career
1923–1925	Germany	4	(0)
- * Club domestic league appearances and goals

Otto Montag (12 October 1897 – 23 December 1973) was a German international footballer.
