= Albert Weber (German footballer) =

German footballer (1888–1940)

Personal information
- Date of birth: 21 November 1888
- Place of birth: Berlin, Germany
- Date of death: 17 September 1940 (aged 51)
- Position: Goalkeeper

International career
Years	Team	Apps	(Gls)
1912	Germany	1	(-)

Albert Weber (21 November 1888, in Berlin – 17 September 1940) was a German amateur football (soccer) player who competed in the 1912 Summer Olympics. He was a member of the German Olympic squad and played one match in the main tournament as goalkeeper.
