= Paul Gehlhaar =

German footballer

Personal information
- Date of birth: 27 August 1905
- Date of death: 30 June 1968 (aged 62)
- Position: Goalkeeper

Senior career*
Years	Team	Apps	(Gls)
1922–1928	VfB Königsberg		
1928–1935	Hertha BSC		
1935–1938	SV Lorenz Berlin		

International career
1928–1931	Germany	2	(0)
- * Club domestic league appearances and goals

Paul Gehlhaar (27 August 1905 - 30 June 1968) was a German international footballer. He was part of Germany's team at the 1928 Summer Olympics, but he did not play in any matches. He was born in Königsberg.
