= Preussen Hindenburg =

German football club

Preußen Hindenburg-Zaborze
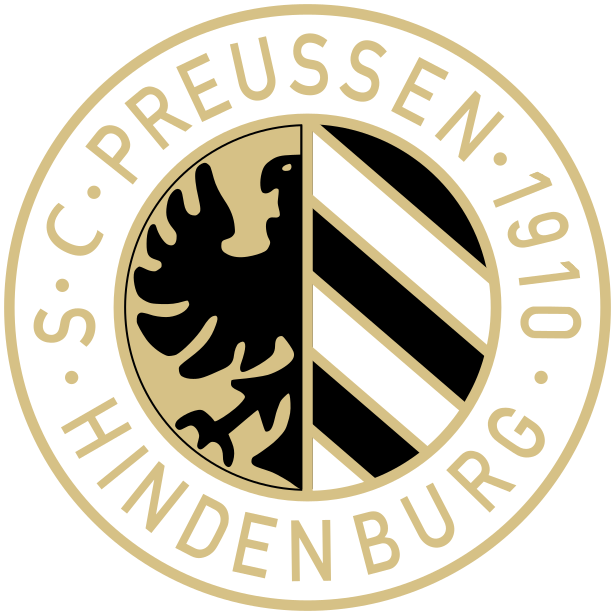
- Full name: Sport-Club Preußen 1910 e.V. Hindenburg-Zaborze
- Founded: 1910
- Dissolved: 1945
- Ground: Preußenplatz im Steinhoffpark
- Capacity: 18,000
Home colours	Away colours

Preußen Hindenburg was a German association football club from the village of Zaborze, Upper Silesia in Germany (present-day part of Zabrze, Poland).

== History ==
The club was established in 1909 as Fußball-Club Borussia 1909 Zaborze out of the membership of the fencing club Fechtklub Edelweiß Hindenburg. On 23 August 1910, the team merged with other local clubs including Fußball-Club Viktoria Zaborze, Sport-Club Silesia Zaborze, and Sport-Club Zaborze to form Sport-Club Preußen Zaborze whose membership was largely made up of post office workers. They took on the name SC Preußen Hindenburg in 1915 when the city was renamed in honour of German military leader and statesman Generalfeldmarschall Paul von Hindenburg, and in 1918 were joined by the membership of Sportfreunde Hindenburg.

The name of the club reverted in 1920 to SC Preußen Zaborze and then again to SC Preußen Hindenburg in 1934, reflecting the struggle between Germany and Poland over the territory of Upper Silesia. When the region was partitioned in 1921, Zaborze remained part of Germany and Preußen played in German football competition in the Südostdeutscher Fußball Verband (Southeast German Football Association). By 1923, the club had over 500 members with departments for athletics and handball. The footballers were a successful regional side capturing the title of German Upper Silesia in 1928, 1929, 1930, and 1931. They emerged as Südostdeutscher champions in 1929 and qualified for the national playoffs by defeating SpVgg Komet Breslau (7:3) before being soundly beaten 1:8 in an eighth-final matchup versus eventual vice-champions Hertha Berlin.

German football competition was reorganized under the Third Reich in 1933 into sixteen top-flight divisions with Preußen becoming part of the Gauliga Schlesien. The following year the club's name was Germanized to Hindenburg and they remained in first division play until being relegated in 1942. During this period the club earned three second-place finishes (1936 and 1939 in the Gauliga Schlesien, 1940 in the Gauliga Oberschlesien), but was unable to make its way back to the national stage. Hindenburg played a final season in the Gauliga Oberschlesien (I) in 1943–44 before competition in the region was disrupted by World War II.

The club played its final match in January 1945 and disappeared following the war when the area became part of Poland. The modern-day Polish club MKS Zaborze acknowledges links to predecessor Preußen through ethnically-Polish pre-war club members who organized Robotniczy Klub Sportowy Pogoń Zabrze later in 1945.

== Honours ==
- South Eastern German champions: 1929
- Upper Silesia (Germany) champions: 1928, 1929, 1930, 1931
