= Heinrich Träg =

German footballer (1893–1976)

Personal information
- Full name: Heinrich Träg
- Date of birth: 3 January 1893
- Place of birth: Nuremberg, Germany
- Date of death: 13 October 1976 (aged 83)
- Position: Forward

Senior career*
Years	Team	Apps	(Gls)
1911–1927	1. FC Nürnberg	455	

International career
1921–1926	Germany	6	(1)
- * Club domestic league appearances and goals

Heinrich Träg (3 January 1893 – 13 October 1976) was a German football forward who played for 1. FC Nürnberg.

== Club career ==
Träg joined Nürnberg in 1911, and went on to win five German football championships with the club. In January 1918, Heinrich scored 10 out of 19 goals 1. FC Nürnberg scored in a 19-0 victory against TV 1891 Regensburg. In a game against Jena, in 1919, in the first half, 1. FC Nürnberg were behind 2-0, but by the full-time whistle, the score was 9-2 with Heinrich scoring 7.

== Career statistics ==
Appearances and goals by club, season, and competition. Only official games are included in this table.
Club	Season	Regional Championship		Southern Germany		German Championship		South German Cup		Total	
Club	Season	Apps	Goals	Apps	Goals	Apps	Goals	Apps	Goals	Apps	Goals
1. FC Nürnberg	1911/1912	2+	2+	0	0	0	0	0	0	2+	2+
1. FC Nürnberg	1912/1913	9	10	0	0	0	0	0	0	9	10
1. FC Nürnberg	1913/1914	9	9	0	0	0	0	0	0	9	9
1. FC Nürnberg	1914/1915	0	0	0	0	0	0	0	0	0	0
1. FC Nürnberg	1915/1916	0	0	0	0	0	0	0	0	0	0
1. FC Nürnberg	1916/1917	3+	3+	2+	3+	0	0	0	0	5+	6+
1. FC Nürnberg	1917/1918	3+	6+	3+	15+	0	0	1+	0+	7+	21+
1. FC Nürnberg	1918/1919	4+	5+	0	0	0	0	2	2	6+	7+
1. FC Nürnberg	1919/1920	15	26	8	7	3	4	1	4	27	41
1. FC Nürnberg	1920/1921	13	21	6	3	2	3	0	0	21	27
1. FC Nürnberg	1921/1922	15	26	2	1	4	3	0	0	21	30
1. FC Nürnberg	1922/1923	11	9	0	0	0	0	4	10	15	19
1. FC Nürnberg	1923/1924	9	8	9	8	2	0	0	0	20	16
1. FC Nürnberg	1924/1925	11	8	7	1	4	3	2	2	24	14
1. FC Nürnberg	1925/1926	9	6	0	0	0	0	0	0	9	6
1. FC Nürnberg	1926/1927	16	8	2	4	4	3	1	0	22	15
1. FC Nürnberg	Total	129+	147+	39+	42+	18	16	12+	19+	198+	225+

== International career ==
He made six appearances for the Germany national team between 1921 and 1926.

== Honours ==
- German football championship: 1920, 1921, 1924, 1925, 1927
