= Leonhard Seiderer =

German footballer (1895–1940)

Lony Seiderer
Personal information
- Full name: Leonhard Seiderer
- Date of birth: 1 November 1895
- Place of birth: Nuremberg, Germany
- Date of death: 3 July 1940 (aged 45)
- Position: Forward

Senior career*
Years	Team	Apps	(Gls)
1908–1917	1. FC Nürnberg		
1917–1928	SpVgg Fürth	196	(130)

International career
1920–1924	Germany	8	(5)

Managerial career
- 1929–1930: Germania Nürnberg
- 1930–1931: ASV Nürnberg
- 1931–1932: Germania Nürnberg
- 1932–1933: Wacker München
- 1933–1934: 1. FC Schweinfurt 05
- 1934–1936: SpVgg Fürth
- 1936–1939: VfB Stuttgart
- * Club domestic league appearances and goals

Leonhard "Lony" Seiderer (1 November 1895 – 3 July 1940) was a German football forward who played for 1. FC Nürnberg and SpVgg Fürth.

Seiderer started his career with Nürnberg before joining Fürth in 1917. He played 196 league games for the club, scoring 130 goals, and won the German football championship in 1926. He also represented the Germany national team, winning eight caps and scoring five goals between 1920 and 1924.

He later coached Germania Nürnberg, ASV Nürnberg, Wacker München, 1. FC Schweinfurt 05, SpVgg Fürth and VfB Stuttgart.

== Honours ==
- German football championship: 1926
