= Hans Lang (German composer) =

German composer

Hans Lang (20 August 1897 – 17 July 1968) was a German composer. He studied at the Akademie der Tonkunst in Munich with Joseph Haas from 1921 to 1926. In 1927 he joined the faculty at the Rheinische Musikhochschule in Cologne, where he taught for three years. In 1930 he became a teacher at the Konservatorium in Nuremberg and took the role of headmaster at the Städtische Berufsschule für Musiker in Munich from 1936. From 1940 to 1943 he taught at the Musikhochschule in Munich and then at the Pädagogische Hochschule in Eichstätt until 1958. His compositions mainly consist of works for choral works, and vocal art songs. He also wrote several works for the accordion which are still popular today.
