= Wolfgang Strobel =

German footballer (1896–1945)

Personal information
- Full name: Wolfgang Strobel
- Date of birth: 17 October 1896
- Place of birth: Nuremberg, Germany
- Date of death: 19 April 1945 (aged 48)
- Place of death: Bad Kreuznach, Germany
- Position: Forward

Senior career*
Years	Team	Apps	(Gls)
1917–1930	1. FC Nürnberg		

International career
1922–1924	Germany	4	(0)
- * Club domestic league appearances and goals

Wolfgang Strobel (17 October 1896 – 19 April 1945) was a German football forward who played for 1. FC Nürnberg.

Strobel joined Nürnberg in 1917, and went on to win four German football championships with the club. He was also capped four times by the Germany national team between 1922 and 1924.

During the Second World War, Strobel worked as an auxiliary policeman. He was fatally shot by American soldiers in April 1945.

== Honours ==
- German football championship: 1920, 1921, 1924, 1925
