= DSV Posen =

German football club

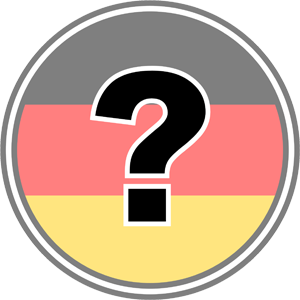
- Full name: Deutscher Sport-Verein Posen
- Founded: 1904
- Dissolved: 1945
Home colours	Away colours

DSV Posen was a German association football club from the City of Posen, in German Reich. The club dominated competition in the city in the period leading up to World War I.

== History ==
DSV joined the top-flight regional Südostdeutscher Fußballverband (SOFV) when the league grew to include Posen in 1909. They were the dominant side in the city and advanced to the SOFV playoffs in four of five seasons prior to the outbreak of World War I in 1914. Their best results were in 1911 and 1912, when the team went as far as the regional semifinals before being put out by Germania Breslau on both occasions (1:3, 1:2).

Football competitions in many parts of Germany were disrupted between 1914 and 1918 by the war and the country was left in disorder following its defeat in the conflict. An uprising succeeded in restoring an independent Republic of Poland, now called Second, built around Poznań, which was the historic center of the country.

Competition in the SOFV was greatly reduced, but was resumed in the 1919–20 season. Play in the Posen district circuit collapsed and they did not send a representative to the Südost regional playoffs. DSV was one of many ethnically-German football clubs in the area that disappeared in 1920 with the reemergence of Poland. Following the outbreak of World War II and the invasion of the country by the Nazis, some of these clubs were reestablished and played against the host of military, police, and other state-sponsored clubs formed in the region. DSV Posen was refounded in 1940 and was again part of German football competition, however the club did not make its way back to top level play and disappeared at the end of the World War II in 1945.

== Honours ==
Posen Football Championship

- Champions (5): 1908–09, 1909–10, 1910–11, 1911–12, 1913–14
