= Hans Lang (footballer) =

German footballer

Personal information
- Full name: Hans Lang
- Date of birth: 8 February 1899
- Place of birth: Augsburg, Germany
- Date of death: 27 April 1943 (aged 44)
- Place of death: Aalborg, German-occupied Denmark
- Position: Midfielder

Senior career*
Years	Team	Apps	(Gls)
1920–1921	BC Augsburg		
1921–1923	SpVgg Fürth		
1924–1930	Hamburger SV		

International career
1922–1926	Germany	10	(0)
- * Club domestic league appearances and goals

Hans Lang (8 February 1899 – 27 April 1943) was a German footballer who played as a midfielder.

== Club career ==
Lang played for BC Augsburg, SpVgg Fürth and Hamburger SV.

== International career ==
Lang was called up for the Germany national team. He won ten caps between 1922 and 1926.

== Personal life and death ==
Lang had served in the German army on the Western front in the First World War when he was taken prisoner of war by the French in 1918 and not released until 1920.

Following the outbreak of the Second World War, Lang was drafted into the Luftwaffe as a Oberfeldwebel. He died in April 1943 in hospital in Aalborg Air Base following a heart attack.
