= Luitpold Popp =

German footballer (1893–1968)

Personal information
- Full name: Luitpold Popp
- Date of birth: 7 March 1893
- Place of birth: Nuremberg, Germany
- Date of death: 30 August 1968 (aged 75)
- Position: Defender

Youth career
- FC Pfeil

Senior career*
Years	Team	Apps	(Gls)
1917–1935	1. FC Nürnberg		

International career
1920–1926	Germany	5	(1)
- * Club domestic league appearances and goals

Luitpold Popp (7 March 1893 – 30 August 1968) was a German football defender who played for 1. FC Nürnberg.

Popp joined Nürnberg in 1917, and went on to win four German football championships with the club. He also made five appearances for the Germany national team between 1920 and 1926.

== Honours ==
- German football championship: 1920, 1921, 1925, 1927
