= Georg Schumann (footballer) =

German footballer

Personal information
- Date of birth: 17 August 1898
- Date of death: unknown
- Position: Forward

Senior career*
Years	Team	Apps	(Gls)
- Vorwärts 90 Berlin

International career
1924	Germany	1	(0)
- * Club domestic league appearances and goals

Georg Schumann (born 17 August 1898, date of death unknown) was a German international footballer.
