= Hans Ruch =

German footballer

Personal information
- Full name: Hans Ruch
- Date of birth: 8 September 1898
- Place of birth: Germany
- Date of death: 8 August 1947 (aged 48)
- Position: Forward

Senior career*
Years	Team	Apps	(Gls)
1918–1925	Union 92 Berlin		
1925–1935	Hertha BSC		

International career
1925–1929	Germany	3	(2)
- * Club domestic league appearances and goals

Hans Ruch (8 September 1898 – 8 August 1947) was a German international footballer who played for Union 92 Berlin and Hertha BSC.
