= Ludwig Leinberger =

German footballer (1903–1943)

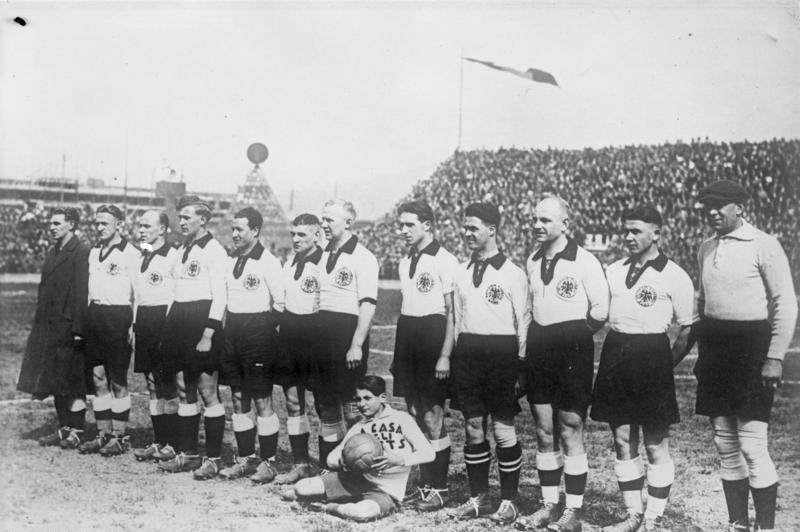

Personal information
- Date of birth: 21 May 1903
- Place of birth: Nuremberg, German Empire
- Date of death: 9 March 1943 (aged 39)
- Place of death: Bad Pyrmont, Germany
- Position: Defender

Youth career
- TV 1846 Nürnberg
- FC Bayern 07 Nürnberg
- BV Solingen 98

Senior career*
Years	Team	Apps	(Gls)
1925–1933	SpVgg Fürth		
1933–1936	CfR Köln		

International career
1927–1933	Germany	24	(0)
- * Club domestic league appearances and goals

Ludwig Leinberger (21 May 1903 – 9 March 1943) was a German footballer. He won 24 caps for Germany in the Interwar period. He was also part of Germany's team at the 1928 Summer Olympics.

Called up for service in the German army in 1941, he died in a military hospital during World War II after surgery for appendicitis.
