= Karl Auer (footballer) =

German footballer

Personal information
- Date of birth: 12 August 1903
- Date of death: 22 February 1945 (aged 41)
- Position: Winger

Youth career
- 1917–1920: SpVgg Fürth

Senior career*
Years	Team	Apps	(Gls)
1920–1930	SpVgg Fürth	139	(54)
1930–1931	Würzburger FV		

International career
1924–1926	Germany	3	(2)
- * Club domestic league appearances and goals

Karl Auer (12 August 1903 – 22 February 1945) was a German international footballer.

== Personal life ==
A businessman after retiring from playing, Auer served as a police sergeant-major in the German Army during the Second World War and was killed in action on the Eastern Front on 22 February 1945.
