= Albert Beier =

German footballer

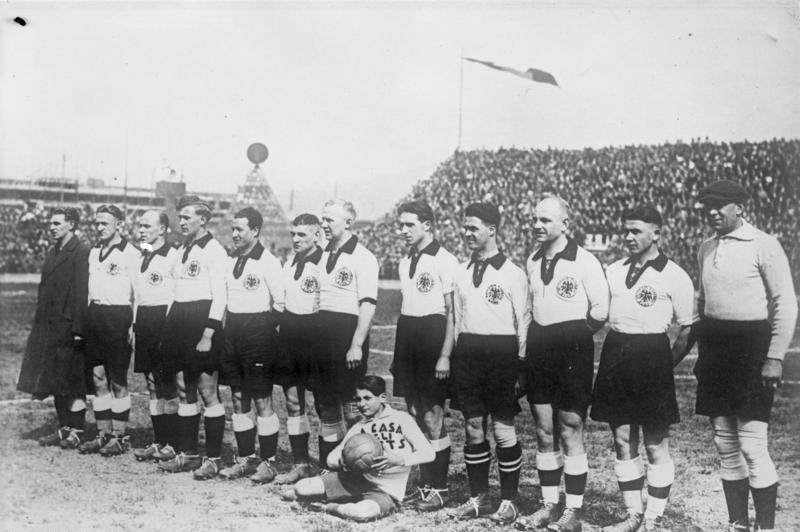
- Beier (sixth from left) before the international against Italy

Personal information
- Date of birth: 28 September 1900
- Place of birth: Lokstedt, Hamburg, Germany
- Date of death: September 21, 1972 (aged 71)

Youth career
- Eintracht Lokstedt

Senior career*
Years	Team	Apps	(Gls)
- FC Union 1903 Altona
1922-	Hamburger SV		

International career
1924	Germany (national)	11	
1928	Germany (Olympics)		
- * Club domestic league appearances and goals

Albert Beier (28 September 1900 – 21 September 1972) was a German footballer. He was a physically inclined, robustly built player.

== Biography ==
Beier was born in Lokstedt, and started his footballing career at Eintracht Lokstedt, before moving to FC Union 1903 Altona and Hamburger SV. His first success came with a North German championship victory. He also reached the German championship final against 1. FC Nürnberg. After two draws, Hamburg was awarded the title, but renounced it.

In 1922, he also won the North German championship title after victories against Union Oberschöneweide and won the 1923 German championship. In the 1923–24 season, he became victorious for a third time in a row with Hamburg in North German championship, but he lost in the championship final match against Nürnberg.

He played his first international match on 14 December 1924 against Switzerland, a 1–1 stalemate. He achieved eleven caps in total for the national team. In 1925, he won the North German championship for a fourth time with Hamburg, but, with Beier suffering with injuries part of the way through the season, other domestic competitions were out of Hamburg's reach.

He played in two federal cup finals in 1927 and 1928 and he also played in the Olympic football tournament in 1928.
