= Breslauer SC 08 =

German football club

- Full name: Breslauer Sportclub 1908 e.V.
- Founded: 1908
- Dissolved: 1933 (merger)
- Ground: Roonstraße
- Capacity: 8,000
- 2007–08: defunct
Home colours	Away colours

Breslauer SC was a German association football club from the city of Breslau, Province of Silesia (today Wrocław, Poland). The club enjoyed its greatest successes in the late 1920s.

== History ==
The team was established in 1908 and soon became part of the top flight regional Südostdeutscher Fußballverband (SOFV, en:Southeast German Football Association). SC first came to note when they finished second in 1925 and moved on to the national playoffs. They beat VfB Leipzig 2–1 in a round of 16 match before going out in the quarter-finals 1–4 to eventual German champions 1. FC Nürnberg.

Breslau claimed its first Südostdeutsche championship in 1926 by defeating Viktoria Forst 3–1 in the league final. The club advanced to the national quarter-finals where they were once more put out by the side that would claim the national crown when they were beaten 0–4 by SpVgg Fürth. A second Südostdeutsche championship two seasons later in 1928 was followed by an early exit from national level play after a 2–3 round of 16 loss to VfB Königsberg.

SC enjoyed its best run on the national stage in 1929. They avenged themselves on Königsberg (1–2) before beating Bayern Munich 4–3 to move on to a semi-final confrontation with SpVgg Fürth. For a third time the Breslauer side was put out of contention for the German title by the club that would eventually emerge as national champions when they lost to Fürth by a score of 1–6.

Breslau continued to field competitive sides into the early 1930s but made only one more national level appearance in 1932 that had the side go out early to Holstein Kiel (1–4). In 1933, the club merged with Vereinigte Breslauer Sportfreunde to form Breslauer SpVg 02 which went on to play in the newly established first division Gauliga Schlesien through to the end of the 1943–44 season.

== Honours ==
- South Eastern German champions: 1926, 1928
