= Hanne Sobek =

German footballer (1900–1989)

Johannes „Hanne“ Sobek
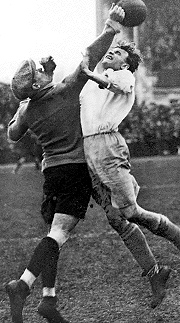
- Hanne Sobek (right).

Personal information
- Full name: Johannes Sobek
- Date of birth: 18 March 1900
- Place of birth: Mirow, German Empire
- Date of death: 17 February 1989 (aged 88)
- Place of death: West Berlin, West Germany
- Position: Midfielder

Senior career*
| Years | Team | Apps | (Gls) |
| 1920–1925 | BTuFC Alemannia 90 | | |
| 1925–1939 | Hertha BSC | | |

International career
| 1923–1931 | Germany | 10 | (2) |

Managerial career
- 1949–1950: SG Union Oberschöneweide
- 1950–1951: SC Union 06 Berlin
- 1959–1963: Hertha BSC
- * Club domestic league appearances and goals

Johannes "Hanne" Sobek (18 March 1900 – 17 February 1989) was a German international footballer.

== Club career ==
On club level he played for BTuFC Alemannia 90 and Hertha BSC. With Hertha he achieved the German football championship in 1930 and 1931.

== International career ==
Sobek won 10 caps for Germany national team between 1923 and 1931.

== Coaching career ==
He coached his former club Hertha between 1959 and 1963.
