= Leo Fiederer =

German footballer

Personal information
- Date of birth: 4 April 1897
- Date of death: October 1946
- Positions: Defender; midfielder; forward

Senior career*
Years	Team	Apps	(Gls)
- SpVgg Fürth

International career
1920	Germany	1	(0)
- * Club domestic league appearances and goals

Leo Fiederer (4 April 1897 – October 1946) was a German international footballer.
