= Ernst Müller (footballer) =

German footballer

Personal information
- Date of birth: 13 July 1901
- Position: Midfielder

Senior career*
Years	Team	Apps	(Gls)
- Hertha BSC

International career
1931	Germany	1	(0)
- * Club domestic league appearances and goals

Ernst Müller (13 July 1901 – 13 September 1958) was a German international footballer.
