= Hans Sutor =

German footballer (1895–1976)

Personal information
- Full name: Hans Sutor
- Date of birth: 28 June 1895
- Place of birth: Nuremberg, Germany
- Date of death: 9 March 1976 (aged 80)
- Position: Forward

Senior career*
Years	Team	Apps	(Gls)
1914–1920	SpVgg Fürth		
1920–1926	1. FC Nürnberg		

International career
1920–1925	Germany	12	(2)
- * Club domestic league appearances and goals

Hans Sutor (28 June 1895 – 9 March 1976) was a German footballer who played as a forward for SpVgg Fürth and 1. FC Nürnberg.

== Club career ==
Sutor started his career with Fürth before joining Nürnberg in 1920. He went on to win three German football championships with Nürnberg.

== International career ==
He was called up to the Germany national team. Sutor won 12 caps and scored two goals between 1920 and 1925.

== Honours ==
- German football championship: 1921, 1924, 1925
