= Georg Kießling =

German footballer (1903–1964)

Personal information
- Date of birth: 7 March 1903
- Date of death: 24 June 1964 (aged 61)
- Position: Forward

Senior career*
Years	Team	Apps	(Gls)
- SpVgg Fürth

International career
1927–1928	Germany	2	(1)
- * Club domestic league appearances and goals

Georg Kießling (7 March 1903 – 24 June 1964) was a German international footballer.
