= Willi Kirsei =

German footballer (1902–1963)

Personal information
- Date of birth: 3 December 1902
- Date of death: 20 December 1963 (aged 61)
- Position: Forward

Senior career*
Years	Team	Apps	(Gls)
1924–1936	Hertha BSC	164	(244)

International career
1924	Germany	1	(0)
- * Club domestic league appearances and goals

Willi Kirsei (3 December 1902 – 20 December 1963) was a German international footballer.

With 244 goals for Hertha Berlin, he is the club's record goalscorer.
