= Hans Hagen (footballer) =

German footballer

Personal information
- Date of birth: 15 July 1894
- Place of birth: Fürth, Germany
- Date of death: 11 October 1957 (aged 63)
- Place of death: Fürth, Germany
- Position: Defender

Youth career
- 1905–1917: FC Schneidig Fürth

Senior career*
Years	Team	Apps	(Gls)
1917–1934	SpVgg Fürth	391+	(38)
1935–1939	1. FC Bamberg		

International career
1920–1930	Germany	12	(0)

Managerial career
- 1935–1939: 1. FC Bamberg
- 1939–1947: SpVgg Fürth
- * Club domestic league appearances and goals

Hans Hagen (15 July 1894 – 11 October 1957) was a German international footballer.

== Club career ==
Twice he was crowned German football champion with SpVgg Fürth in the 1920s.

== International career ==
Hagen won 12 caps between 1920 and 1930 for the Germany national team.
