= Viktoria Forst =

German football club

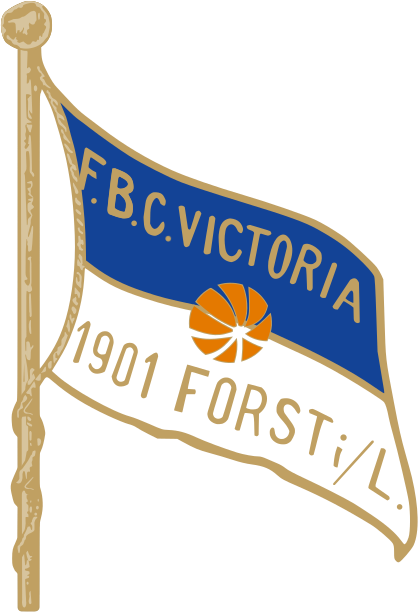
- Full name: Fußballclub Viktoria 1901 Forst
- Founded: 1901
- Dissolved: 1945
- Ground: Viktoriaplatz Kronenstraße
Home colours	Away colours

Viktoria Forst was a German association football club from the city of Forst (Lausitz), Brandenburg. It was established in 1901 and played in the regional Südostdeutschland division.

== History ==
In 1920 Viktoria advanced to the league final where they were beaten 2:6 by Vereinigte Breslauer Sportfreunde. The two clubs met again in the final of the 1920–21 season and the Breslau side repeated their victory (2:1).

Forst exacted a measure of revenge the following season when they beat Breslau 6:1 in a contest to determine who would advance to the German national playoffs. However, they lost to Breslau (0:0, 7:3) in contesting the Südost division title. In later national level play Viktoria were put out in a quarterfinal match versus Norden-Nordwest Berlin (0:1). The team remained competitive through the 1920s claiming their only title win in 1925 before being eliminated from the national playoffs by Schwarz-Weiß Essen in an eighth-final contest (1:2). After a third divisional title loss to Breslau (1:3) in 1926, Viktoria made another early exit from the national stage, this time falling to SpVgg Fürth (0:5) which was at the time one of the country's dominant sides.

Forst stumbled its way through to the end of the decade and on into the early 1930s, making just one more appearance in the regional playoffs before fading from sight. The club disappeared following World War II.

== Honours ==
- South Eastern German champions: 1922, 1925
