= Gauliga Schlesien =

Football league in Silesia

Gauliga Schlesien Gauligas Niederschlesien Gauliga Oberschlesien
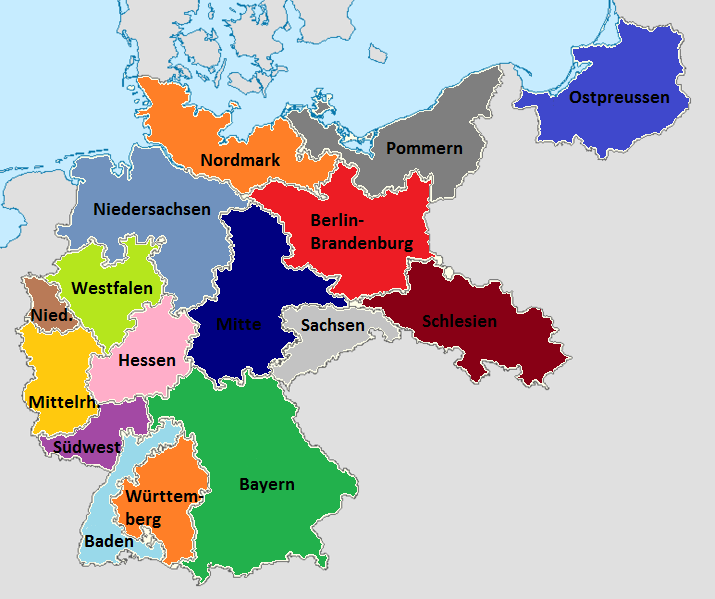
- Founded: 1933
- Folded: 1945
- Replaced by: region became part of Poland
- Country: Nazi Germany
- Provinces: Province of Lower Silesia; Province of Upper Silesia; Autonomous Silesian Voivodeship (from 1939)
- Gau (from 1933): Gau Schlesien (1933–41); Gau Niederschlesien (1941–45); Gau Oberschlesien (1941–45)
- Level on pyramid: Level 1
- Domestic cup: Tschammerpokal
- Last champions: Gauliga Niederschlesien: STC Hirschberg Gauliga Oberschlesien: Germania Königshütte (1943-44)

The Gauliga Schlesien was the highest football league in the region of Silesia (German:Schlesien), which consisted of the Prussian provinces of Lower Silesia and Upper Silesia from 1933 to 1945. Shortly after the formation of the league, the Nazis reorganised the administrative regions in Germany, and the Gau Silesia, later subdivided into Gau Upper Silesia and Gau Lower Silesia, replaced the Prussian provinces.

After the Polish defeat in 1939, the parts of Upper Silesia awarded to Poland after the First World War were reoccupied by Nazi Germany and added to the Gau Oberschlesien.

From 1941, the Gauliga Schlesien was split into two separate leagues, the Gauliga Niederschlesien and the Gauliga Oberschlesien.

== Overview ==
=== Gauliga Schlesien ===
The league was introduced by the Nazi Sports Office in 1933, after the Nazi takeover of power in Germany. It replaced the Oberliga as the highest level of play of the regional football competitions.

In its first season, the league had ten clubs, playing each other once at home and once away. The league champion then qualified for the German championship. The bottom two teams were relegated. The league modus and strength did not change until 1939.

Because of the outbreak of World War II in 1939, the league was split into two regional groups, one of five and one of seven clubs and the season start was delayed until early December 1939. The two group champions then played a home-and-away final for the Gauliga championship. For its last season, 1940–41, it returned to a single-division format, now with eleven clubs, some of them from the newly occupied regions formerly part of Poland. This last season was however not completed and with most teams having only one or two games to go, a winner was declared and the competition cancelled.

After this, the league was split into two separate competitions.

=== Gauliga Niederschlesien ===
The league started with nine clubs in one single division, all from the region of the former Prussian province. It was increased to ten clubs for its second season, 1942–43.

The last completed season, 1943–44, the league was subdivided in three regions with all-up five divisions. the three regional champions then played out the Gauliga champion. All together, a record 33 clubs took part in this season.

The arrival of the war in the region made football impossible and, most likely, the last season, 1944–45, did not get underway at all anymore.

=== Gauliga Oberschlesien ===
The new Gauliga Oberschlesien compromised the pre-war area of Upper Silesia and the formerly Polish reoccupied parts of the region.

The league started out with ten clubs in one single division in 1941. It was reduced to nine clubs for its second season 1942-43 but returned to ten clubs in the next year.

In its last season, 1944–45, it was meant to have nine clubs again but the arrival of the war in Silesia meant an early cancellation of the competition.

=== Aftermath ===
With the end of the Nazi era, the Gauligas ceased to exist and Silesia became part of the Soviet occupation zone. In turn, the Soviets handed over the region to Poland as compensation for the territories they lost in their east. Only a very small part of Silesia, the area west of the river Neiße, remained with Germany, becoming part of the new East Germany.

The majority of Germans in the region were forced to leave Silesia and almost all German football clubs disbanded. The region became part of the Polish football league system.

The small remaining part of Silesia not awarded to Poland, mainly the former Niederschlesischer Oberlausitzkreis, is now part of the German federal state of Saxony.

== Founding members of the league ==
The ten founding members and their league positions in 1932-33 were:

- Beuthener SuSV 09, champions Oberschlesien division, champion of South-East Germany
- SpVgg 02 Breslau
- SC Hertha Breslau
- Vorwärts-Rasensport Gleiwitz
- SC Vorwärts Breslau
- SpVgg Ratibor 03
- SC Preußen Hindenburg
- FV 06 Breslau
- SV 1919 Hoyerswerda
- STC Görlitz, champions Oberlausitz division

== Winners and runners-up of the league ==
The winners and runners-up of the league:

=== Gauliga Schlesien ===
Season	Winner	Runner-Up
1933-34	Beuthener SuSV 09	SpVgg 02 Breslau
1934-35	Vorwärts-Rasensport Gleiwitz	SC Vorwärts Breslau
1935-36	Vorwärts-Rasensport Gleiwitz	SC Preußen Hindenburg
1936-37	Beuthener SuSV 09	Vorwärts-Rasensport Gleiwitz
1937-38	Vorwärts-Rasensport Gleiwitz	SpVgg 02 Breslau
1938-39	Vorwärts-Rasensport Gleiwitz	SC Preußen Hindenburg
1939-40	Vorwärts-Rasensport Gleiwitz	FV 06 Breslau
1940-41	Vorwärts-Rasensport Gleiwitz *	Germania Königshütte *

- * winner declared.

=== Gauliga Niederschlesien ===
Season	Winner	Runner-Up
1941-42	SpVgg 02 Breslau	LSV Reinecke Brieg
1942-43	LSV Reinecke Brieg	SpVgg 02 Breslau
1943-44	STC Hirschberg	SpVgg 02 Breslau

=== Gauliga Oberschlesien ===
Season	Winner	Runner-Up
1941-42	Germania Königshütte	Bismarckhütter SV 99
1942-43	Germania Königshütte	TuS Lipine
1943-44	Germania Königshütte	TuS Lipine

== Placings in the league 1933-44 ==
The complete list of all clubs participating in the league:

=== Gauliga Schlesien ===
Club	1934	1935	1936	1937	1938	1939	1940	1941
Beuthener SuSV 09	1	3	3	1	10		3	8
SpVgg Breslau 02	2	7	5	3	2	4	4	5
Hertha Breslau	3	9		8	4	3	3	7
Vorwärts-Rasensport Gleiwitz	4	1	1	2	1	1	1	1
Vorwärts Breslau	5	2	8	7	9			10
SpVgg Ratibor 03	6	4	7	10		6	6	
SC Preußen Hindenburg	7	8	2	6	3	2	2	6
FV 06 Breslau	8	6	4	4	8	8	1	9
SV Hoyerswerda	9							
STC Görlitz	10						8	
Deichsel Hindenburg		5	9					
Schlesien Haynau		10						
VfB Gleiwitz			6	9				
VfB Breslau			10				7	
Reichsbahn Gleiwitz				5	6	5	5	
SV Klettendorf					5	9	5	
Sportfreunde Klausberg					7	7	4	
1. FC Breslau						10	6	
ATSV Liegnitz							2	
Germania Königshütte								2
TuS Schwientochlowitz								3
1. FC Kattowitz								4
VfB Liegnitz								11

- The 1940–41 season was not completed, Germania Königshütte led the league after having played 19 of 20 games but Vorwärts Rasensport Gleiwitz was declared league champions, sitting in second place, two points behind with three games left to play.

=== Gauliga Niederschlesien ===
Club	1942	1943	1944
SpVgg Breslau 02	1	2	1
LSV Reinicke Brieg	2	1	2
WSV Liegnitz	3	7	1
Hertha Breslau	4	5	2
FV Breslau 06	5	3	5
Alemannia Breslau	6	9	3
Reichsbahn Oels	7	10	6
Tuspo Liegnitz	8	6	2
DSV Schweidnitz	9	4	1
Gelb-Weiß Görlitz	10		
Immelman Breslau		8	6
STC Hirschberg			1
Vorwärts Breslau			1
Viktoria 95 Breslau			3
Minerva 09 Breslau			4
Union/Wacker Breslau			4
VfB Breslau			5
SC Jauer			3
LSV Lüben			4
LSV Sprottau			5
SG Liegnitz			6
TSV Haynau			7
Preußen Glogau			8
LSV Görlitz			2
Laubaner SV			3
SV Hoyerswerda			4
STC Görlitz			5
Kittlitztreben			6
Preußen Altwasser			2
Silesia Freiburg			3
VfB Glatz			4
Germania Weißenstein			5
Waldenburg 09			6
Sportfreunde Neurode			7
Rot-Weiß Striegau			8
Reichsbahn Dittersbach			9
NTSG Gottesburg			10

=== Gauliga Oberschlesien ===
Club	1942	1943	1944
Germania Königshütte	1	1	2
Bismarckhütter SV 99	2	4	3
Vorwärts-Rasensport Gleiwitz	3	5	8
TuS Lipine	4	2	1
Beuthener SuSV 09	5	6	9
TuS Schwientochlowitz	6	7	10
1. FC Kattowitz	7	8	7
Hindenburg 09	8	9	
RSG Myslowitz	9		
SC Preußen Hindenburg	10		4
Sportfreunde Knurow		3	6
Adler Tarnowitz		10	
Reichsbahn SG Kattowitz			5

== Clubs from Poland in the Gauliga Schlesien ==
From 1940, clubs from the occupied country of Poland took part in the German Gauliga system. These clubs, from the region of Upper Slesia, could only take part in the German league system after germanising its name and declaring themselves German.

The following clubs played in the Gauliga under their Germanised names:

- TuS Schwientochlowitz, was Śląsk Świętochłowice
- TuS Lipine, was Naprzód Lipiny
- Germania Königshütte, was AKS Chorzów
- 1. FC Kattowitz, retained its name
- Bismarckhütter SV 99, was Ruch Chorzów
- RSG Myslowitz, from Mysłowice
- Sportfreunde Knurow, from Knurów
- Adler Tarnowitz, from Tarnowskie Góry
- Reichsbahn SG Kattowitz, from Katowice
