= Vereinigte Breslauer Sportfreunde =

German football club

- Full name: Vereinigte Breslauer Sportfreunde e.V.
- Founded: 1919
- Ground: Südpark
- League: Südostdeutschland
- 2007–08: defunct
Home colours	Away colours

Vereinigte Breslauer Sportfreunde was a German association football club from what was at the time the city of Breslau, Lower Silesia in Germany and is today Wrocław, Poland. The club was established in 1919 through the merger of predecessor sides SC Preußen Breslau and Verein Breslauer Sportfreunde. They dominated play in the regional Südostdeutschland league in the period immediately following World War I.

== History ==
Sportclub Preußen Breslau was established 15 December 1902 and made a single appearance in the regional Südostdeutschland (I) championship round in 1913. After qualifying through a 1–0 victory over Britannia Posen they went on to face Askania Forst in a semifinal contest. They lost the match 2–1, but the result was annulled and the game replayed. The rematch ended in another 2–1 victory for Forst which stood. After World War I the team merged with Verein Breslauer Sportfreunde.

SC 1904 Breslau was established in 1904 and took the name Verein Breslauer Sportfreunde in 1911. They advanced to the league final in 1913–14 beating Beuthen 09 3–2 in qualifying before eliminating Viktoria Forst 2–1. In the final they were beaten 3–1 by old rival Askania.

World War I severely curtailed football competition in Germany, which was suspended or local in character between 1914 and 1919. Following the conflict, VBS became the dominant side in Südost regional play. They again beat Beuthen in qualifying (5–1) before avenging themselves on Askania through a 1–0 semifinal victory. The team then claimed the division title by way of a 6–2 win over Viktoria Forst. The title win advanced Breslau to the national stage. They defeated Union Oberschöneweide 3–2 in the quarterfinals before going out 4–0 to SpVgg Fürth. The club's 1920–21 campaign ended in another divisional title win through a 2–1 victory over Viktoria, but they suffered another early exit from the national playoffs when beaten 2–1 by Wacker Halle.

VBS earned three more Südostdeutschland championships from 1922 to 1924. In 1922, they were eliminated in qualifying play for the national championship by Viktoria Forst (6–1 loss), but captured the division title by beating Viktoria 7–3 in the semifinals and then overcoming Preußen Kattowitz 5–1 in the final. Quarterfinal appearances in the German championships ended in defeat in each of the following two seasons; 4–0 to SpVgg Fürth in 1923, and 3–0 to Hamburger SV in 1924.

The team claimed its last title in 1927 and made losing national eighth-final appearances in 1927, 1928, and 1930. In 1933, VBS merged with Breslauer Sportclub 08 to form Breslauer SpVg 02. That club went on to first division play in the Gauliga Schlesien and Gauliga Niederschlesien before disappearing at the end of World War II.

Camillo Ugi represented predecessor side Preußen on the Germany national team, earning a single cap before leaving for VfB Leipzig in 1909 where he would earn another 14 caps.

== Honours ==
- South Eastern German champions (6): 1920, 1921, 1922, 1923, 1924, 1927
