= Anton Kugler =

German footballer

Personal information
- Date of birth: 28 March 1898
- Date of death: 2 June 1962 (aged 64)
- Position: Defender

Youth career
- 1911–1914: 1. FC Nürnberg

Senior career*
Years	Team	Apps	(Gls)
1914–1932	1. FC Nürnberg		

International career
1923–1927	Germany	7	(0)
- * Club domestic league appearances and goals

Anton Kugler (28 March 1898 – 2 June 1962) was a German international footballer.
