= Heinrich Stuhlfauth =

German footballer

Heiner Stuhlfauth
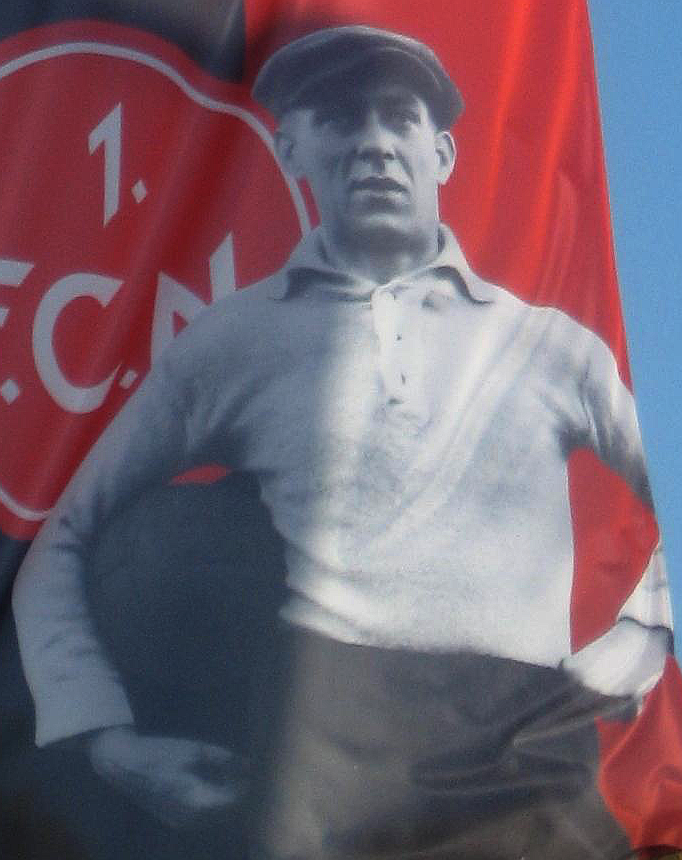
- Photograph of Stuhlfauth on a banner commemorating 1. FC Nürnberg's 1927 championship triumph

Personal information
- Full name: Heinrich Stuhlfauth
- Date of birth: 11 January 1896
- Place of birth: Nuremberg, Germany
- Date of death: 12 September 1966 (aged 70)
- Place of death: Nuremberg, West Germany
- Height: 1.84 m (6 ft 0 in)
- Position: Goalkeeper

Senior career*
| Years | Team | Apps | (Gls) |
| 1916–1933 | 1. FC Nürnberg | | |

International career
| 1920–1930 | Germany | 21 | (0) |
- * Club domestic league appearances and goals

Heinrich Stuhlfauth (11 January 1896 – 12 September 1966) was a German goalkeeper. He was part of Germany's team at the 1928 Summer Olympics.

== Career ==
From 1916 to 1933 he played in 606 games for 1. FC Nürnberg, then a dominating team in German football, winning five national championships (1920, 1921, 1924, 1925, 1927). Between 1918 and 1922 Nuremberg did not lose in 104 association games, with a goal difference of 480:47.

He also gained 21 international caps, captaining the Germany national side in six appearances. He surpassed the record of Eugen Kipp (19 games) for the most appearances for the national team. His last international cap was a 0–2 loss against Italy in Frankfurt in 1930.

Stuhlfauth was considered one of the best goalkeepers of his time, along with legendary Spanish keeper Ricardo Zamora. He was known for being one of the first "playing" goalkeepers, actively participating in the game. In games he always wore a grey sweater and a flat cap.

== Post-playing career ==
Until World War II Stuhlfauth kept a prominent Nuremberg inn. Afterwards he worked as a sports teacher and coach. He remained involved with the 1. FC Nürnberg and was widely credited for his achievements and loyalty. In 2008, he was posthumously introduced into Germany's Sports Hall of Fame. He also has a street named after him in Zerzabelshof.

One of his quotes is still prominently cited by the club and its fans:

"It is an honour to play for the town, the club and the citizens of Nuremberg. May all of this be preserved, and may the great FC Nürnberg never founder."
