= South Eastern German football championship =

- Founded
- 1906
- Disbanded
- 1933
- Nation
- German Empire
- Germany
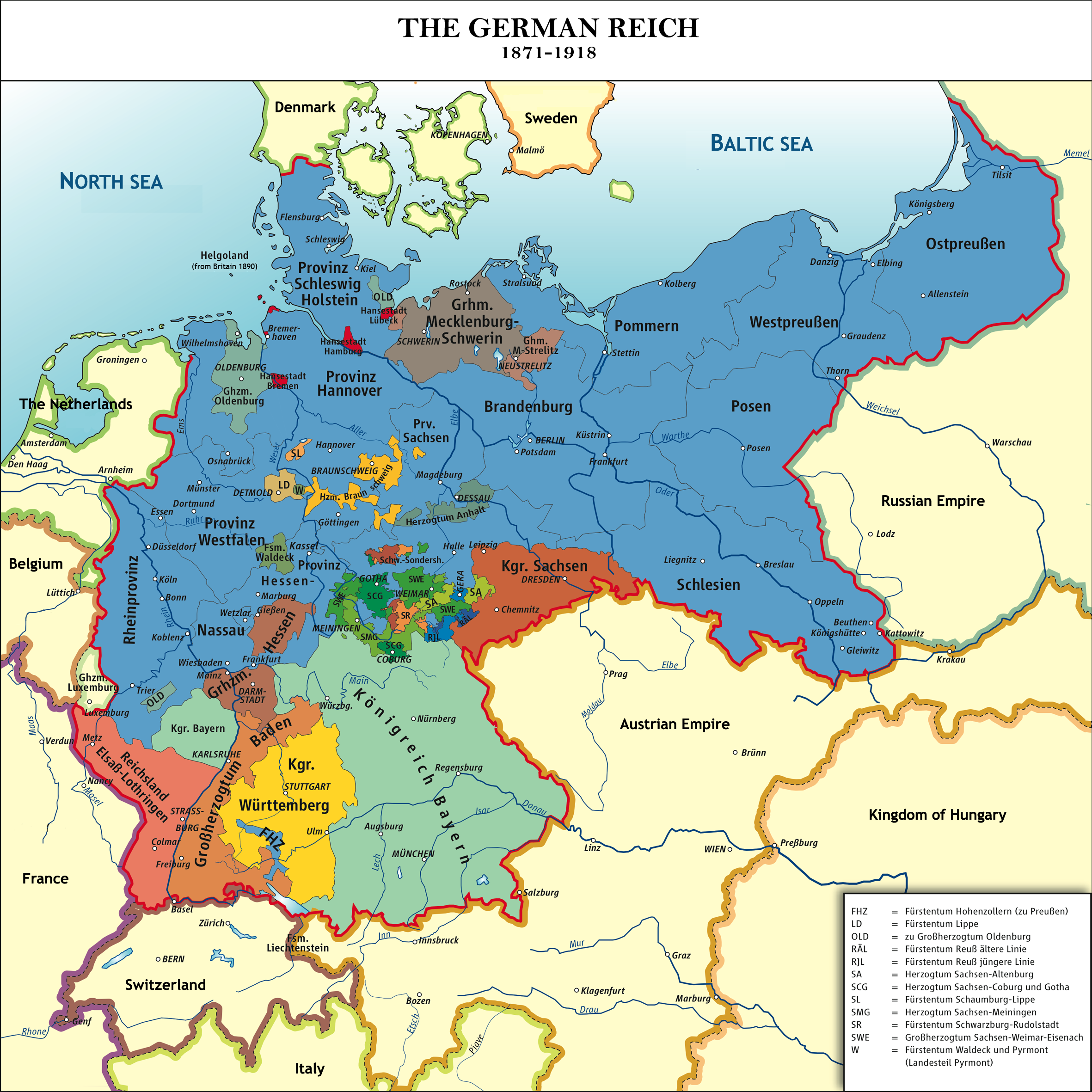
- Province
- Silesia
- Posen
- Number of Seasons
- 23
- Replaced by
- Gauliga Schlesien
- Level on Pyramid
- Level 1
- Last Champions 1932-33
- Beuthener SuSV 09

The South Eastern German football championship (German: Südostdeutsche Fußball Meisterschaft) was the highest association football competition in the Prussian provinces of Silesia, which was divided into the Province of Lower Silesia and the Province of Upper Silesia after 1919, and Posen, which mostly became part of Poland in 1919. The competition was disbanded in 1933.

== Overview ==
German football was, from its beginnings, divided into regional associations, each of which carried out their own championship matches. These often pre-dated the national German championship. With the inception of the latter in 1903, the former became qualifying tournaments. Regional championships still held a high value for the local clubs. These regional championships were:

- Southern German football championship - formed in 1898
- Brandenburg football championship - formed in 1898
- Central German football championship - formed in 1902
- Western German football championship - formed in 1903
- March football championship - existed from 1903 to 1911
- Northern German football championship - formed in 1906
- South Eastern German football championship - formed in 1906
- Baltic football championship - formed in 1908

Regional championships were suspended with the rise of the Nazis to power in 1933. At the end of the Second World War, some resumed, but in league format. Others, such as the Baltic championship, completely disappeared, especially if the territories they were held in were no longer part of Germany. With the South West German football championship, a new regional competition also appeared in 1945. Ultimately, with the formation of the Fußball-Bundesliga, regional championships ceased altogether.

== History ==
=== Background ===
The Prussian province of Silesia (red), within the Kingdom of Prussia (blue)

When the South Eastern German championship was established in 1906, the region of South Eastern Germany (German: Südostdeutschland) was politically part of the Kingdom of Prussia, as the Province of Silesia and the Province of Posen.

With the defeat of the German Empire in 1918 and the formation of a Republic, the former Kingdoms and Principalities of Germany became states. For most of the Prussian provinces, this only meant that the Kingdom was replaced with the Free State of Prussia. Silesia (German: Schlesien) however was subdivided into two new provinces, those being:

- Province of Upper Silesia
- Province of Lower Silesia

Additionally, parts of the former province of Silesia were awarded to Poland and Czechoslovakia after the war, these being:

- Hlučín Region, to Czechoslovakia
- Eastern parts of Upper Silesia, to Poland to become the Autonomous Silesian Voivodeship

Posen became almost completely part of Poland, as the Poznań Voivodeship. A small strip along the border remained with Germany and became the border province Posen-West Prussia (German: Grenzmark Posen-Westpreussen).

=== Football association ===
The South Eastern German Football Association was formed on 18 March 1906, thereby in cooperating all regional associations:

- Verband Breslauer Ballspielvereine, formed 23 February 1902
- Verband Niederlausitzer Ballspielvereine, formed 17 January 1904
- Verband Kattowitzer Ballspiel Vereine, formed 1906

== Competition ==
=== 1906 to 1914 ===
The South Eastern German football championship was first contested in 1906 and won by the SC Schlesien Breslau. No results beyond the final are known. The winner of this first competition then took part in the fourth edition of the national German championship. Clubs from the south east of Germany had already taken part in the previous edition of the competition, but not in 1903 or 1904. No club from the south east ever reached the German championship final and even semi-final appearances were limited to two occasions, 1920 and 1929.

To qualify for the South Eastern German championship, a club had to take out the title in its regional competition or league. As more football clubs were formed in Germany, the number of leagues increased and thereby also the numbers of clubs taking part in the South Eastern championship. Originally, from 1907, four regional champions took part from the following regions:

- Breslau
- Niederlausitz
- Niederschlesien
- Oberschlesien

In 1910, Posen was added as a fifth region. In 1911, the Oberlausitz champions joined.

The second edition was played out in the knockout modus again, but now involving four clubs, a system that remained in place until 1910, when the number of clubs was enlarged to six.

In its last pre-First World War season, 1914, the competition was enlarged to seven clubs, but remained unchanged otherwise.

=== 1915 to 1919 ===
In 1914-15, football in Germany had come to an almost complete halt. As it became clear, that the war would last longer than anticipated, local competitions restarted in 1915. In most regions of Germany, like the South, the championships were restarted from 1915 onwards but in the South East, this was not so. A south eastern championship was not played again until 1920.

=== 1920 to 1933 ===
The 1920 championship resumed in the same fashion as the last one had finished in 1914, seven clubs in a knockout competition. The champions, Sportfreunde Breslau, achieved the greatest success of any south eastern club so far in the national title games, when it reached the semi-finals, to bow out 4-0 to SpVgg Fürth.

In 1921, the competition was staged with only six clubs. Clubs from Posen, now Poznań, did not enter the championship anymore as the city had become part of Poland. Play was further disrupted in 1922. The competition was to be staged as a five team league but could not be completed in time for the German finals because Preußen Kattowitz, from the now Polish city of Katowice, was initially unable to travel due to passport issues. The issue was later resolved and the championship completed. The 1923 edition was again held as a five team league, now without clubs from either Poznań or Katowice, each team playing the other once. Instead, a Mittleschlesien champion was added to the competition.

The five team league system remained in place for 1924 and was enlarged to six clubs in 1925. Also, from this season, the German championship was enlarged, too, and the south east was now allowed to send both champion and runners-up to the national finals. The 1926 season saw a further increase, to seven clubs in the championship, and, in 1927, to eight teams. From 1926, six regional competitions existed again, after the addition of the Bergland champion. Those six regional competitions feeding the South Eastern German championship were:

- Niederlausitz
- Niederschlesien
- Oberlausitz
- Oberschlesien
- Mittelschlesien
- Bergland

This arrangement remained in place for 1928 but was reduced to five clubs in 1929 again, but now with home-and-away games. SC Breslau 08 made a second semi-finals appearance for a club from the south east that year, going out to the later champion SpVgg Fürth 6-1. In 1930, six clubs played in the finals again, still with home-and-away games. This system remained in place until the competition was disbanded in 1933.

=== Aftermath ===
The South Eastern German championship was replaced with the Gauliga Schlesien by the Nazis in 1933. In the era that followed, the clubs from the south east continued to see only limited success in the national finals, Vorwärts-Rasensport Gleiwitz making a semi-finals appearance in 1936, losing to Fortuna Düsseldorf 3-1 and then being demolished by FC Schalke 04 8-1 in the game for third place.

After the end of the Second World War, Germany suffered further territorial loss, and Silesia became almost completely part of Poland. Only a small strip west of the Oder-Neisse line remained part of Germany. The city of Cottbus, never part of Silesia, but its clubs taking part in the South Eastern German championship nevertheless, and Hoyerswerda are two cities who send clubs to the championship and are still part of Germany today. German clubs in Silesia were either dissolved, as in most cases, or become part of the Polish football league system.

== South Eastern German football champions ==
| Season | Winner | Runner-Up | Result |
|---|---|---|---|
| 1906 | SC Schlesien Breslau | FV Brandenburg Cottbus | 3–1 |
| 1907 | SC Schlesien Breslau | TuFC Britannia Cottbus | 2–1 |
| 1908 | VfR 1897 Breslau | FC Preußen Kattowitz | 5–2 |
| 1909 | SC Alemannia Cottbus | FC Preußen Kattowitz | 3–2 |
| 1910 | VfR 1897 Breslau | FC Askania Forst | 3–1 |
| 1911 | FC Askania Forst | SC Germania Breslau | 3–2 / 3–0 |
| 1912 | ATV Liegnitz | SC Germania Breslau | 5–1 |
| 1913 | FC Askania Forst | FC Preußen Kattowitz | 1–2 / 4–0 |
| 1914 | FC Askania Forst | Sportfreunde Breslau | 3–1 |
| 1915 | not held | | |
| 1916 | not held | | |
| 1917 | not held | | |
| 1918 | not held | | |
| 1919 | not held | | |
| 1920 | Sportfreunde Breslau | FC Viktoria Forst | 6–2 |
| 1921 | Sportfreunde Breslau | FC Viktoria Forst | 2–1 aet |
| 1922 | Sportfreunde Breslau | not determined | N/A |
| 1923 | Sportfreunde Breslau | Beuthener SuSV 09 | 2–0 |
| 1924 | Sportfreunde Breslau | FC Viktoria Forst | N/A |
| 1925 | FC Viktoria Forst | Breslauer SC 08 | 1–0 |
| 1926 | Breslauer SC 08 | FC Viktoria Forst | 0–0 / 3–1 |
| 1927 | Sportfreunde Breslau | Breslauer FV 06 | 6–0 |
| 1928 | Breslauer SC 08 | Sportfreunde Breslau | N/A |
| 1929 | SC Preußen Hindenburg | Breslauer SC 08 | N/A |
| 1930 | Beuthener SuSV 09 | Sportfreunde Breslau | N/A |
| 1931 | Beuthener SuSV 09 | Breslauer FV 06 | N/A |
| 1932 | Beuthener SuSV 09 | Breslauer SC 08 | N/A |
| 1933 | Beuthener SuSV 09 | Vorwärts-Rasensport Gleiwitz | N/A |
