= 1914 German football championship =

1914 German championship
Deutsche Fußballmeisterschaft
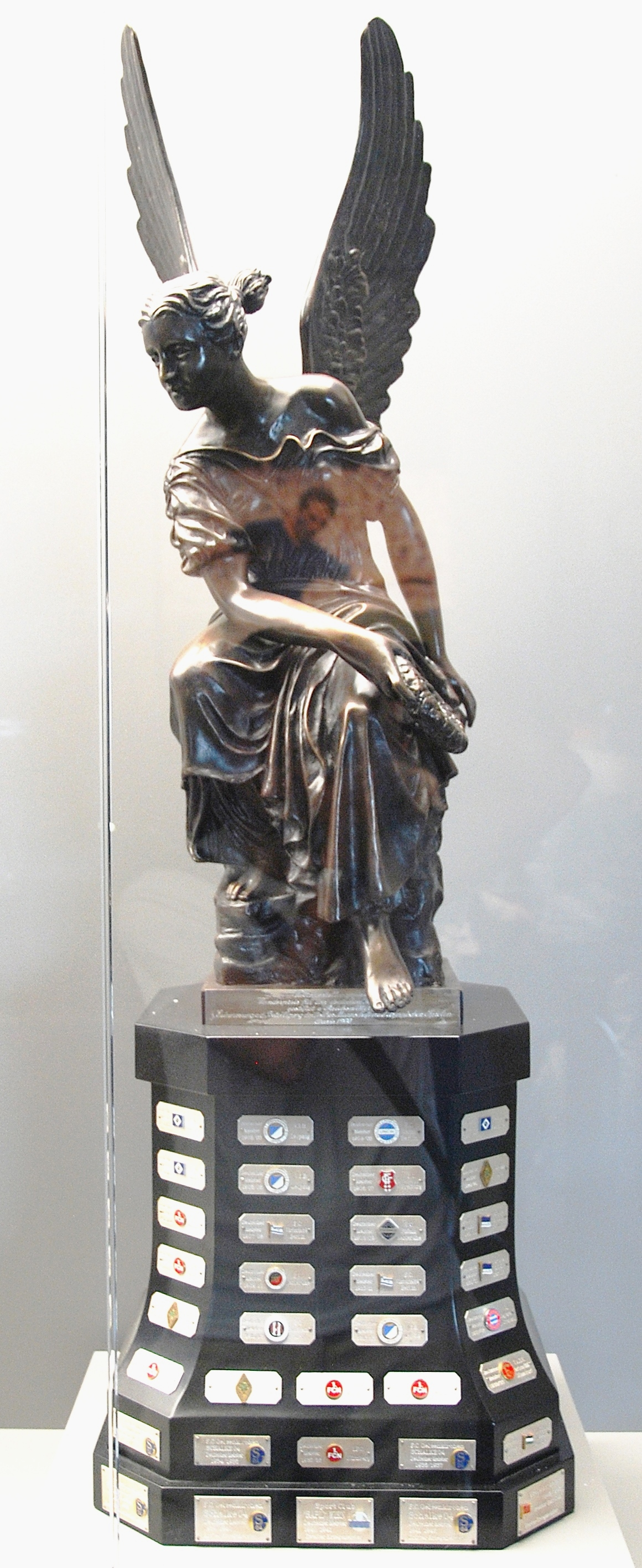
- Replica of the Viktoria trophy

Tournament details
- Country: Germany
- Dates: 3–31 May
- Teams: 8

Final positions
- Champions: SpVgg Fürth; 1st German title
- Runners-up: VfB Leipzig

Tournament statistics
- Matches played: 7
- Goals scored: 30 (4.29 per match)
- Top goal scorer: Karl Franz (5 goals)

The 1914 German football championship, the 12th edition of the competition, was won by SpVgg Fürth, defeating VfB Leipzig 3–2 after extra time in the final. It was the last edition of the championship before the First World War, with the next edition not held until after the war in 1920.

For SpVgg Fürth it was the first national championship won with two more to follow in 1926 and 1929 as well as a losing appearance in the 1920 final. VfB Leipzig, the first-ever German champions in 1903, had also won the 1906 and 1913 editions as well as making a losing appearance in 1911 and was the most successful club in the pre–First World War era of the competition.

Fürth's Karl Franz was the top scorer of the 1914 championship with five goals.

Eight clubs qualified for the competition played in knock-out format, the champions of each of the seven regional football championships as well as the defending German champions.

== Overview ==
The German championship final was contested by SpVgg Fürth and VfB Leipzig with the former winning its first national championship. The final lasted for an historic 153 minutes, until SpVgg scored the winning goal, the longest game in German football history. Fürth took an early lead and Leipzig lost a player through a broken leg just before half time, unable to bring on a substitute as substitutions were not allowed in those days. Nevertheless, Leipzig equalised in the 83rd minute, forcing extra time. Fürth once more took the lead but Leipzig equalised again four minutes later. After 120 minutes the game stood at two all and the rules stipulated that the game was to be continued in 10-minute blocks of extra time until a winner was determined. A red card for Fürth player Hans Schmidt in the 138 minute put both clubs at an equal number of ten players again. The game was finally decided in the 153rd minute when Karl Franz scored the winning goal for SpVgg Fürth.

== Qualified teams ==
The teams qualified through the regional championships:

Club	Qualified as
Prussia Königsberg	Baltic champions
Askania Forst	South Eastern German champions
Berliner BC	Brandenburg champion
SpVgg Leipzig	Central German champions
Altonaer FC 93	Northern German champions
Duisburger SV	Western German champions
SpVgg Fürth	Southern German champions
VfB Leipzig	Holders

== Competition ==
=== Quarter-finals ===
The quarter-finals, played on 3 May 1914:

Team 1	Score	Team 2
Berliner BC	4–0	Askania Forst
Duisburger SV	4–1 aet	Altonaer FC 93
SpVgg Fürth	2–1	SpVgg Leipzig
VfB Leipzig	4–1	Prussia Königsberg

=== Semi-finals ===
The semi-finals, played on 17 May 1914:

Team 1	Score	Team 2
SpVgg Fürth	4–3 aet	Berliner BC
VfB Leipzig	1–0	Duisburger SV

=== Final ===
31 May 1914
16:00

SpVgg Fürth	3–2 (a.e.t.)	VfB Leipzig
Franz 17', 153'; Weicz 104'	Report	Pendorf 83'; Hesse 108'

Viktoria-Platz, Magdeburg
Attendance: 6,000
Referee: C. von Paquet (Berlin)

SPVGG FÜRTH
GK	(German Empire) Hermann Polenski
RB	(German Empire) Karl Burger
LB	(German Empire) Georg Wellhöfer
RH	(German Empire) Sebastian Seidel
CH	(Austria) Adolf Riebe
LH	(German Empire) Hans Schmidt (red card) 138'
OR	(German Empire) Georg Wunderlich
IR	(German Empire) Karl Franz
CF	(Hungary) Frigyes Weicz
IL	(German Empire) Julius Hirsch (c)
OL	(German Empire) Hans Jakob
Manager:
(England) William Townley

VFB LEIPZIG
GK	(German Empire) Johannes Schneider
RB	(German Empire) Willy Völker
LB	(German Empire) Alfred Herrmann
RH	(German Empire) Paul Michel (injured) (substituted off) 42'
CH	(German Empire) Eduard Pendorf
LH	(German Empire) Curt Hesse (c)
OR	(German Empire) Georg Richter
IR	(German Empire) Johannes Völckers
CF	(German Empire) Paul Pömpner
IL	(German Empire) Hans Dolge
OL	(German Empire) Adalbert Friedrich
Manager:
None

=== Match summary ===
The final, played on 31 May 1914 at Viktoria-Platz in Magdeburg, pitted defending champions VfB Leipzig against southern German champions SpVgg Fürth, coached by Englishman William Townley. Karl Franz opened the scoring for Fürth in the 17th minute before Leipzig right half Paul Michel suffered a match-ending injury in the 42nd minute; because substitutions were not permitted in 1914, Leipzig played the remainder of the match with ten men.

Despite their numerical disadvantage, Leipzig equalised through Eduard Pendorf in the 83rd minute to force extra time. Frigyes Weicz restored Fürth's lead in the 104th minute, only for Leipzig captain Curt Hesse to level the score again at 2–2 in the 108th minute. With the match still tied after 120 minutes, play continued in 10-minute sudden-death periods. Fürth half-back Hans Schmidt was sent off in the 138th minute, reducing both sides to ten players, before Karl Franz scored the decisive goal in the 153rd minute to secure Fürth's first national championship in the longest completed final in German football history.
