= 1903 German football championship final =

1903 German championship final
Endspiel um die Deutsche Fußballmeisterschaft
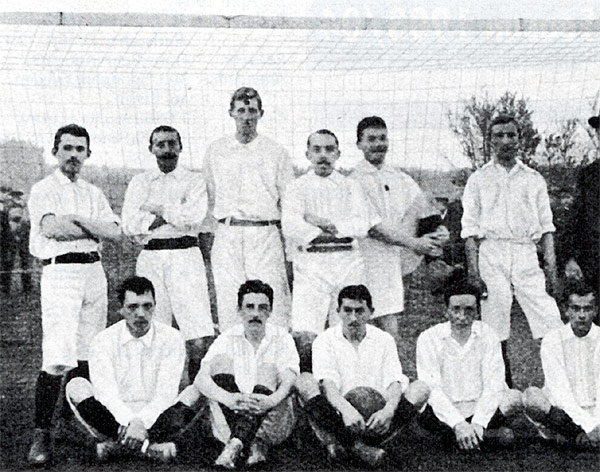
- Team photo of VfB Leipzig
- Event: 1903 German football championship
VfB Leipzig	DFC Prag
7	2
- Date: 31 May 1903
- Venue: Exerzierweide, Altona
- Referee: Franz Behr (Altona)
- Attendance: 2,000

The 1903 German football championship final decided the winner of the 1903 German football championship, the 1st edition of the German football championship, a knockout football cup competition contested by the regional league winners to determine the national champions. The match was played on 31 May 1903 at the Exerzierweide in Altona. VfB Leipzig won the match 7–2 against DFC Prag to become the first national champions in German football history.

== Route to the final ==
The German football championship was a six team single-elimination knockout cup competition, featuring the champions of regional football associations. There were a total of two rounds leading up to the final. For all matches, the winner after 90 minutes advances. If still tied, extra time was used to determine the winner.

Note: In all results below, the score of the finalist is given first (H: home; A: away; N: neutral).

VfB Leipzig		Round	DFC Prag
Opponent	Result	1903 German football championship	Opponent	Result
Britannia Berlin (A)	3–1	Quarter-finals	Karlsruher FV (N)	Cancelled
Altonaer FC 93 (H)	6–3	Semi-finals	Karlsruher FV (N)	Walkover

== Match ==
=== Details ===
31 May 1903
16:45 CET

VfB Leipzig	7–2	DFC Prag
W. Friedrich 31'; A. Friedrich 49'; Riso 54', 71', 88'; Stanischewski 69', 85'	Report	Meyer 22', 65'

Exerzierweide, Altona
Attendance: 2,000
Referee: Franz Behr (Altona)

VfB Leipzig	DFC Prag

GK	(Germany) Ernst Raydt (c)
RB	(Germany) Erhardt Schmidt
LB	(Germany) Arthur Werner
RH	(Germany) Wilhelm Rößler
CH	(Germany) Walter Friedrich
LH	(Germany) Otto Braune
OR	(Germany) Georg Steinbeck
IR	(Germany) Bruno Stanischewski
CF	(Germany) Heinrich Riso
IL	(Germany) Adalbert Friedrich
OL	(Germany) Ottomar Aßmus

GK	(Austria-Hungary) Charles Pick
RB	(Austria-Hungary) Ladislaus Kurpiel
LB	(Austria-Hungary) Johann Schwarz
RH	(Austria-Hungary) Béla Robitsek
CH	(Austria-Hungary) Paul Fischl
LH	(Austria-Hungary) Franz Sedlacek
OR	(Austria-Hungary) Karl Beck
IR	(Austria-Hungary) Karl Kubik
CF	(Austria-Hungary) Meyer
IL	(Austria-Hungary) Fischer
OL	(Austria-Hungary) Kubik

Match rules

- 90 minutes.
- 30 minutes of extra time if necessary.
- Unlimited 10 minute intervals of sudden death extra time if scores still level.
- Replay at the referee's discretion if no winner.
- No substitutions.
