= 1906 German football championship =

1906 German championship
Deutsche Fußballmeisterschaft
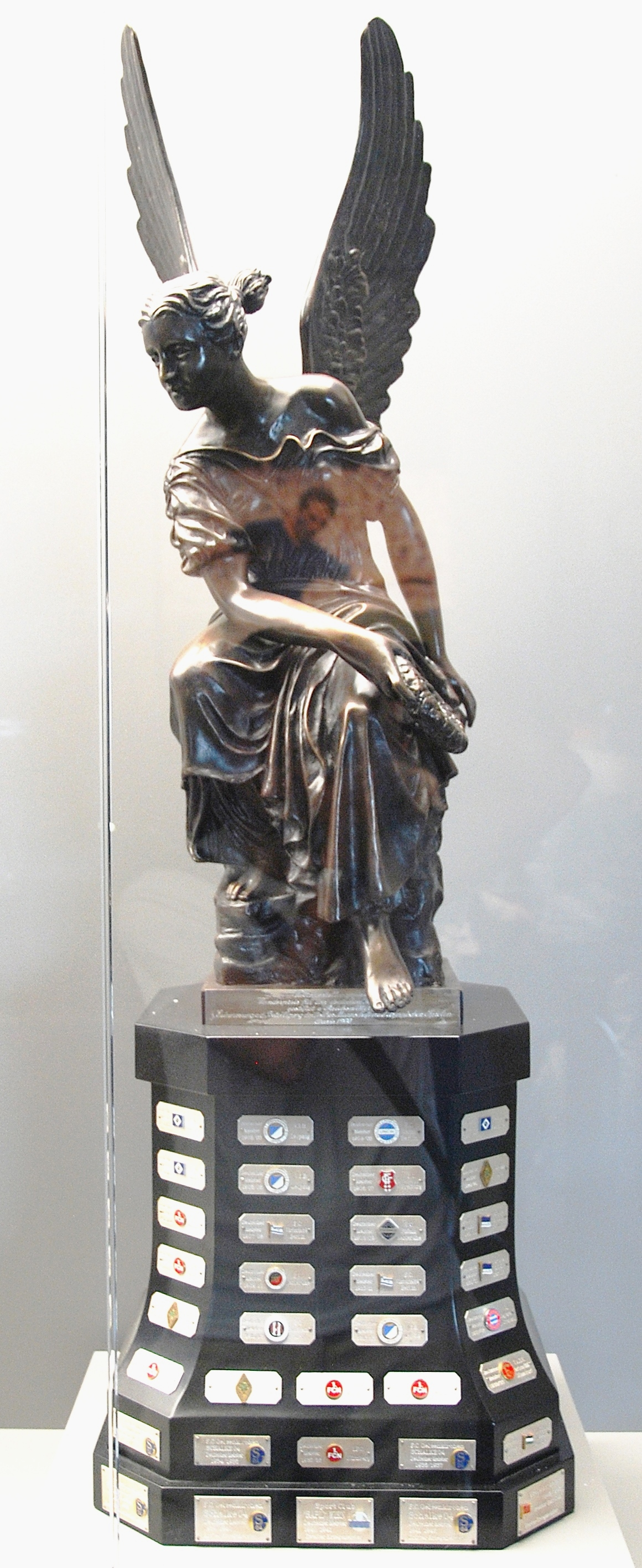
- Replica of the Viktoria trophy

Tournament details
- Country: Germany
- Dates: 22 April – 27 May
- Teams: 8

Final positions
- Champions: VfB Leipzig; 2nd German title
- Runner-up: 1. FC Pforzheim

Tournament statistics
- Matches played: 7
- Goals scored: 39 (5.57 per match)
- Top goal scorer(s): Edgar Blüher (7 goals)

The 1906 German football championship was the fourth competition for the national championship of Germany. Held under the auspices of the German Football Association (DFB), eight teams competed for the title. For the first time only champions of regional football associations were admitted to the championship, excluding champions of local associations such as the Verband Magdeburger Ballspielvereine (Association of Magdeburg ballgame clubs). An exception was the situation in Berlin where two associations — the Verband Berliner Ballspielvereine (VBB) and the Märkischer Fußballbund (MFB) — existed. Both their champions were admitted, as were defending champions Berliner TuFC Union 92. This led to three teams from Berlin competing in the final tournament.

== Qualified teams ==
The qualified teams:

Qualified team	Qualified from
Schlesien Breslau	South Eastern German champions
Berliner FC Hertha 92	VBB champions
Berliner FC Norden-Nordwest	MFB champions
Berliner TuFC Union 92	Defending champions
VfB Leipzig	Central German champions
FC Victoria Hamburg	Northern German champions
Cölner FC 1899	Western German champions
1. FC Pforzheim	Southern German champions

== Competition ==
=== Quarter-finals ===
22 April 1906 Quarter-final	VfB Leipzig	9 – 1	SV Norden-Nordwest	Leipzig
				Stadium: Stadion des Friedens; Referee: Weimann

29 April 1906 Quarter-final	Schlesien Breslau	0 – 7	Berliner FC Hertha 92	Dresden
				Referee: K. Baier

29 April 1906 Quarter-final	FC Victoria Hamburg	1 – 3	Union 92 Berlin	Hamburg
				Stadium: Exerzierwiese Altona; Referee: Weimann

6 May 1906 Quarter-final	1. FC Pforzheim	4 – 2 (a.e.t.)	SC Koln 99	Mannheim
				Stadium: Stadion an den Brauereien; Referee: W. Henkel

=== Semi-finals ===
6 May 1906 Semi-final	Berliner FC Hertha	2 – 3	VfB Leipzig	Berlin
				Stadium: Platz des BFC Viktoria; Attendance: 2,000; Referee: Otto Eikhof

20 May 1906 Semi-final	Union 92 Berlin	0 – 4	1. FC Pforzheim	Braunschweig
				Referee: Johannes Runge

=== Final ===
1906 German football championship
11 June 1906
Final

VfB Leipzig	2 — 1	1. FC Pforzheim
Blüher 15'; Riso 85'		Stöhr 26'

Club-Stadion an der Ziegelgasse, Nuremberg
Attendance: 1,100
Referee: Otto Eikhof

VfB Leipzig
Johannes Schneider
Arthur Werner
Erhard Schmidt
Heinrich Riso
Georg Steinbeck
Paul Oppermann
Karl Uhle
Camillo Ugi
Martin Laessig
Adalbert Friedrich
Edgar Blüher
Manager:

1. FC Pforzheim
Emil Faas
Hermann Steudle
Wilhelm Hiller
Karl Jäger
Hermann Hofer
Arthur Hiller
Gustav Stöhr
Hermann Schweikert
Emil Rühl
Gustav Maier
Julius Fink
Manager:
