= 1913 German football championship =

1913 German championship
Deutsche Fußballmeisterschaft
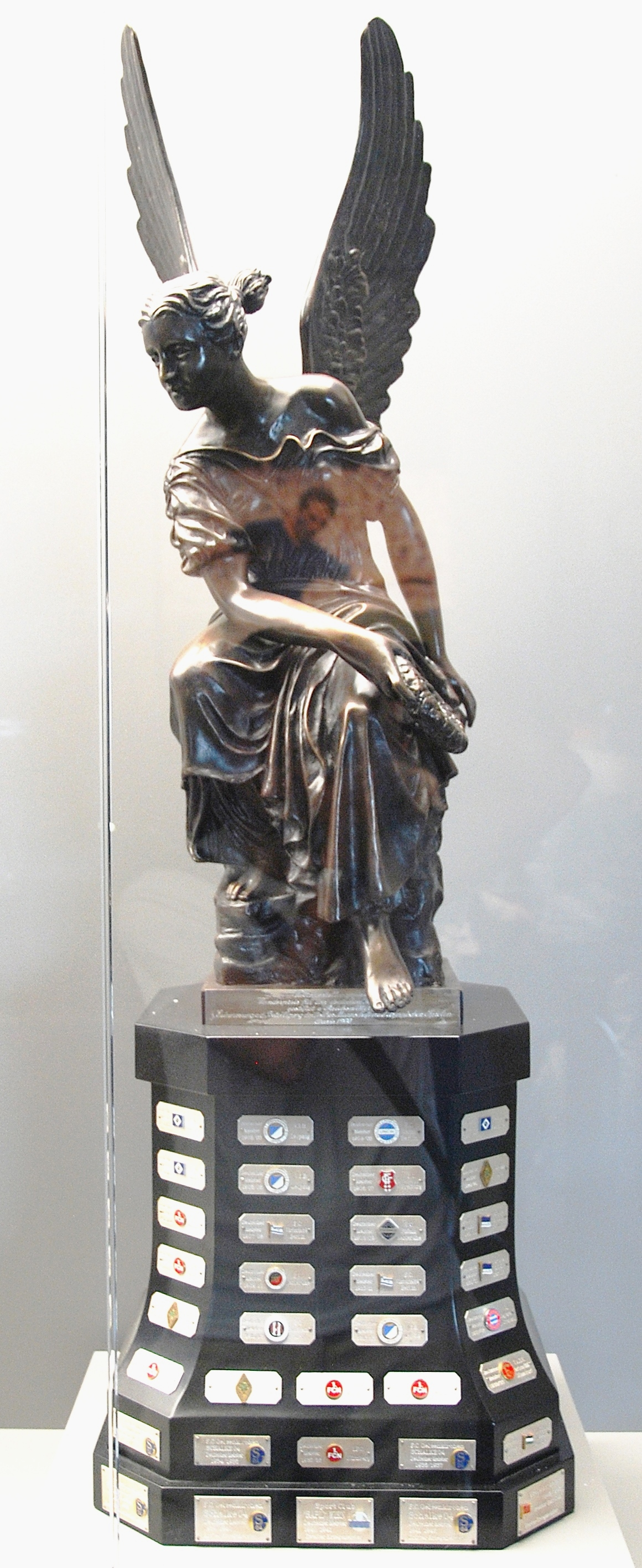
- Replica of the Viktoria trophy

Tournament details
- Country: Germany
- Dates: 13 April – 11 May
- Teams: 7

Final positions
- Champions: VfB Leipzig; 3rd German title
- Runners-up: Duisburger SV

Tournament statistics
- Matches played: 6
- Goals scored: 26 (4.33 per match)
- Top goal scorer: Paul Pömpner (5 goals)

The 1913 German football championship, the 11th edition of the competition, was won by VfB Leipzig, defeating Duisburger SV 3–1 in the final.

VfB Leipzig won its third national championship, having previously taken out the title in 1903 and 1906 as well as making a losing appearance in the 1911 final. Leipzig became the first club to win three German championships and would make another appearance in the final in 1914, the last in the club's history. For Duisburger SV it was the sole appearance in the championship final.

Leipzig's Paul Pömpner was the top scorer of the 1913 championship, with five goals.

Nominally eight clubs qualified for the competition played in knock-out format, the champions of each of the seven regional football championships as well as the defending German champions. The Northern German championship however was determined after the German championship had started and its winner, Eintracht Braunschweig, was unable to participate.

== Qualified teams ==
The teams qualified through the regional championships:

Club	Qualified as
Prussia Königsberg	Baltic champions
Askania Forst	South Eastern German champions
Viktoria 89 Berlin	Brandenburg champion
VfB Leipzig	Central German champions
Duisburger SV	Western German champions
Stuttgarter Kickers	Southern German champions
Holstein Kiel	Holders

== Competition ==
=== Quarter-finals ===
The quarter-finals, played on 13 and 20 April 1913:

Team 1	Score	Team 2
Duisburger SV	2–1	Stuttgarter Kickers
VfB Leipzig	5–0	Askania Forst
Viktoria 89 Berlin	6–1	Prussia Königsberg

- Holstein Kiel received a bye in the quarter-finals.

=== Semi-finals ===
The semi-finals, played on 27 April 1913:

Team 1	Score	Team 2
Duisburger SpV	2–1	Holstein Kiel
VfB Leipzig	3–1	Viktoria 89 Berlin

=== Final ===
11 May 1913

VfB Leipzig	3 – 1	Duisburger SV
Pendorf 9'; Pömpner 15'; Büscher 60' (o.g.)	Report	Fischer 75'

MTV 1879-Platz, Munich
Attendance: 5,000
Referee: Knab

VFB LEIPZIG
(German Empire) Johannes Schneider
(German Empire) Alfred Herrmann
(German Empire) Eduard Pendorf
(German Empire) Paul Michel
(German Empire) Curt Hesse
(German Empire) Willy Völker
(German Empire) Johannes Völckers
(German Empire) Georg Richter
(German Empire) Paul Pömpner
(German Empire) Adalbert Friedrich
(German Empire) Hans Dolge
Manager:

DUISBURGER SV
(German Empire) Otto Bruckschen
(German Empire) Adam Schäfer
(German Empire) Hermann Klinkers
(German Empire) Willi Schütten
(German Empire) Heinz Ludewig
(German Empire) Kornelius Büscher
(German Empire) Hermann Steinhauer
(German Empire) Sebastian Quatram
(German Empire) Walter Fischer
(German Empire) Heinrich Fischer
(German Empire) Anton Bongartz
Manager:
