= Rapide 93 Berlin =

German football club

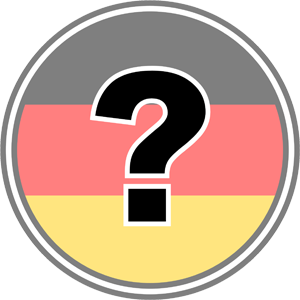
- Full name: Berliner Fußball- und Cricket-Club Rapide 1893
- Founded: 1893
- Dissolved: 1950
Home colours	Away colours

Rapide Berlin was an early German association football club from the city of Berlin. One of the founding members of the DFB (Deutscher Fussball Bund, en:German Football Association) at Leipzig in 1900, the club is part of the tradition of current-day side SV Nord Wedding.

== History ==
Rapide was established on 1 October 1893 as Berliner Fußball- und Cricket-Club Rapide 1893 and made a handful of appearances in the top-flight Oberliga Berlin in the early 1900s. In 1920, they were joined by FC Falke 1913 Berlin before going through a series of name changes. They briefly adopted the name Berliner FC Rapide 93 Niederschönhausen on 23 August 1923, for the northern city neighbourhood where the team was based, before becoming Deutscher FC Rapide 93 Berlin later in the year. They began playing as BFC Rapide Niederschönhausen again in 1927. They remained a lower tier local side through to the end of World War II.

Following the war occupying Allied authorities banned most organizations across the country as part of the process of de-Nazification and the club was briefly lost in 1945. The former membership was re-organized into two clubs – Berliner FC Rapide and Sportgemeinschaft Rapide 93 Niederschönhausen – reflecting the Cold War division of the city into West and East Berlin. On 25 May 1950, FC joined SC Wedding Berlin to form Berliner FC Wedding. SG became BSG Empor Pankow in March 1953 and was part of the separate football competition the emerged in East Germany until folding on 4 July 1967. Wedding merged with SV Nord-Nordstern Berlin on 1 July 2001 to create present-day club SV Nord-Wedding 1893.

== Stadium ==
From its founding through to the end of World War II, Rapide played in several stadiums; Exerzierweide Schönhauser Straße (1893–1900), Schebera-Platz Gesundbrunnen (1900–04), and either of Schlosspark Pankow and Bismarkstaße Niederschönhausen (1904–45).
