= Robert Jaspert =

German football player and coach

Personal information
- Full name: Robert Niels Jaspert
- Date of birth: 26 February 1960 (age 66)
- Place of birth: Sydney, New South Wales, Australia
- Position: Midfielder

Senior career*
Years	Team	Apps	(Gls)
- SF Kladow
- Hertha Zehlendorf
- Wacker 04 Berlin
- Preußen Wilmersdorf
- Rapide Wedding
- Weddinger FC
- SC Westend 1901
1991–1992	NSC Marathon 02		
1992–1994	Tennis Borussia Berlin II		

Managerial career
- 1994–2000: Tennis Borussia Berlin II
- 1999: Tennis Borussia Berlin (interim)
- 2000–2001: Tennis Borussia Berlin
- 2001: MSV Duisburg (assistant)
- 2004–2005: South Korea (assistant)
- 2007: Ahed
- 2008: Sapia (assistant)
- 2008–2010: Vaduz (assistant)
- 2013–2015: 1. FC Union Berlin II
- 2015: FC Viktoria 1889 Berlin
- 2016: Ahed
- 2017: Al-Muharraq
- 2017: Ansar
- 2019–2020: Safa
- 2021–2022: Ansar
- * Club domestic league appearances and goals

Robert Niels Jaspert (born 26 February 1960) is a German professional football coach and former player.

== Playing career ==
Jaspert represented SF Kladow, Hertha Zehlendorf, SC Wacker 04 Berlin, Preußen Wilmersdorf, SC Rapide Wedding, Weddinger FC, SC Westend 1901, NSC Marathon 02 and Tennis Borussia Berlin II during an amateur playing career based solely in Berlin.

== Managerial career ==
In 1996, Jaspert became manager of Tennis Borussia's reserve team, and was later promoted to the role of head coach of the first team on 16 November 2000. After a run of seven straight defeats in the Regionalliga Nord, Jaspert was replaced in March 2001 by Friedhelm Haebermann.

During the 2001–02 season, Jaspert was assistant manager to Pierre Littbarski at MSV Duisburg—a role in which he also functioned from 2004 until 2005 under Jo Bonfrere for the South Korea national team.

After a short break from football, Jaspert took over the reins of Lebanese Premier League team Ahed. In June 2007, Jaspert survived a bombing at the hotel he was staying at in Beirut as he was not home at the time. The bombing killed the politician Walid Eido, and two footballers of Al Ahed's rivals Nejmeh.

Jaspert became Littbarski's assistant again in 2008, this time in Iran for Saipa and later for Liechtenstein's Vaduz.

In January 2012, Jaspert was announced as a joint manager of Croatian club Karlovac alongside Krešimir Ganjto after the club was taken over by German company Haag Sportmanagement, but the deal never took place.

=== Ansar ===
On 22 March 2021, Jaspert was appointed head coach of Ansar, following the dismissal of Abdul-Wahab Abu Al-Hail. He helped his team win their first league title since 2007, and 14th overall, by beating rivals Nejmeh in the Beirut derby in the last matchday of the 2020–21 season. also helped Ansar win the double, beating Nejmeh in the 2020–21 Lebanese FA Cup final on penalty shoot-outs. The two titles were Jaspert's first.

Jaspert's contract was renewed on 4 July 2021. After a series of negative results in the first half of the 2021–22 season, Jaspert submitted his resignation.

== Honours ==
Ansar

- Lebanese Premier League: 2020–21
- Lebanese FA Cup: 2020–21
- Lebanese Super Cup: 2021
