= SC Adler Pankow =

German football club

Adler Pankow
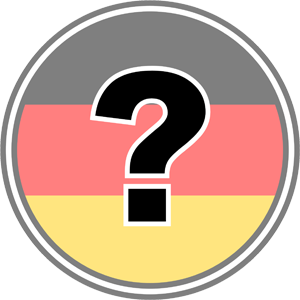
- Full name: Pankower Sportclub Adler 08 e.V.
- Founded: 1908
- League: defunct
Home colours	Away colours

SC Adler Pankow was a German association football club from the district of Pankow in the city of Berlin. It was formed out of the 1910 union of Pankow 08 and Adler Pankow. Both of these sides, as well as their successor, played in the Verband Brandenburgischer Ballspielvereine (VBB, en:Association of Brandenburg Ball Clubs) one of several top flight leagues in Berlin and the surrounding state of Brandenburg.

== History ==
Following World War I, Adler became part of the Arbeiter-Turn- und Sportbund (ATSB, en:Worker's Gymnastics and Sports Association), a nationwide leftist sports organization that became home to a large number of worker's clubs. The ATSB ran a separate competition from that of the DFB (Deutscher Fußball Bund, en:German Football Association) and staged its first national championship in 1920.

Adler won the ATSB title in 1928 by beating VfL 88 Naumburg 6:3 in their semifinal match up before defeating ASV Westend Frankfurt 5:4 in the final staged 6 May in Berlin's Grunewald Stadium in front of 12,000 spectators. In 1933, the Nazis banned worker's clubs alongside other clubs with political or faith-based affiliations. The membership of the Pankow club joined Berliner SC Favorit. In addition to its footballers, Adler brought to Favorit its ground at Kühnemannstaße and strong hockey and handball departments.

Favorit was a lower tier local side through to the end of World War II. After the conflict, occupying Allied authorities banned most organizations across the country, including sports and football clubs, as part of the process of de-Nazification. New clubs soon emerged and the former membership of Favorit became part of Sportgruppe Nordbahn Berlin, formed in 1945. It was renamed VfL Nord Berlin on 21 May 1947, which eventually joined current-day club SV Nord Wedding 1893, making Adler part of the tradition of that club alongside several other neighbouring associations.

== Honours ==
- ATSB champions: 1928
