= Oberliga Berlin =

The term Oberliga Berlin may describe any one of several historical upper-tier level football competitions based in the city of Berlin, Germany.

- Brandenburg football championship, refers to any of several early (1898–1923) first division competitions known by various names, but sometimes referred to as the Oberliga Berlin or Oberliga Berlin-Brandenburg
- Oberliga Berlin-Brandenburg, the first division competition active 1923–1933
- Gauliga Berlin-Brandenburg, the first division competition established under the Third Reich and active 1933–1945
- Oberliga Berlin (1945–63), the first tier competition active in West Berlin 1945–1963
- Amateur-Oberliga Berlin, the second and third tier competitions active in West Berlin 1947–1991
