= Easter Tournament in Prague =

Velikonoční turnaj v Praze
- Founded: 1924
- Abolished: 1961
- Region: Czechoslovakia (UEFA)
- Teams: 4
- Last champions: (Czechoslovakia) AC Sparta Prague
- Most championships: (Czechoslovakia) SK Slavia Prague (5 titles)

Easter Tournament in Prague (Czech: Velikonoční turnaj v Praze) was an annual spring international football tournament held in Prague, Czechoslovakia, from 1924 to 1961 with interruptions. The tournament was held in the months of March-April.

The teams played 3 round-robin 90-minute matches in the tournament.

== Finals ==
| Year | Champion | Runners-up | Third place | Fourth place |
|---|---|---|---|---|
Easter Tournament
| 1924 | (Czechoslovakia) SK Slavia Prague | (Czechoslovakia) Deutscher FC Prag | (Austria) First Vienna FC | (Czechoslovakia) Český Atletický FC |
Tournament Jubileum SK Slavia Prague
| 1925 | (Czechoslovakia) SK Slavia Prague | (Czechoslovakia) Deutscher FC Prag | (Czechoslovakia) SK Vršovice | (Kingdom of Yugoslavia) SK Jugoslavija |
Easter Tournament
| 1929 | (Czechoslovakia) Deutscher FC Prag | (Czechoslovakia) Bohemians Prague | (Hungary) III Kerület Budapest | (Czechoslovakia) SK Kladno |
International Tournament of SK Slavia Prague 1929
| 1929 | (Czechoslovakia) SK Slavia Prague | (Czechoslovakia) SK Viktoria Žižkov | (Austria) SK Rapid Wien | (Czechoslovakia) SK Sparta Košíře |
Slavonic Clubs Tournament
| 1932 | (Czechoslovakia) AC Sparta Prague | (Czechoslovakia) Bohemians Prague | (Kingdom of Yugoslavia) HNK Hajduk Split | (Bulgaria) PFC Levski Sofia |
Easter Tournament
| 1948 | (Hungary) Csepel SC Budapest | (Hungary) MTK Budapest FC | (Czechoslovakia) AC Sparta Prague | (Czechoslovakia) SK Slavia Prague |
| 1955 | (Socialist Federal Republic of Yugoslavia) GNK Dinamo Zagreb | (Belgium) ARA La Gantoise | (Czechoslovakia) SK Slavia Prague | (Czechoslovakia) AC Sparta Prague |
| 1956 | (Czechoslovakia) SK Slavia Prague | (Socialist Federal Republic of Yugoslavia) HNK Hajduk Split | (Sweden) IFK Göteborg | (Czechoslovakia) AC Sparta Prague |
| 1957 | (Czechoslovakia) SK Slavia Prague | (Hungary) Vasas SC Budapest | (Germany) 1. FC Saarbrücken | (Czechoslovakia) AC Sparta Prague |
| 1961 | (Czechoslovakia) AC Sparta Prague | (Austria) Wiener Sport-Club | (Czechoslovakia) Červená Hviezda Bratislava | (Sweden) AIK Stockholm |
