= Berliner TuFC Elf =

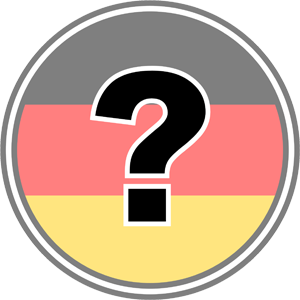
- Full name: Berliner Thor-und Fußballclub Elf 1900
- Founded: 1900
- Dissolved: 1912
Home colours	Away colours

Berliner Thor- und Fußballclub Elf 1900 was a German association football club from the Schöneberg district of south central Berlin. Predecessor to current day club BSC Kickers 1900 Berlin, it was established 1 November 1900 — which Kickers take as their foundation date — and was active as an independent side until 1912. The German term Elf is the number 11 and refers to the month of the club's founding.

From 1904 to 1906 BTuFC Elf was part of the Märkischen Meisterschaft, one of two competing top-flight city leagues, where they earned only lower table finishes. In 1912, they merged with Berliner Fußballclub Hubertus 05 to form Berliner Sportclub Hubertuself. A second merger in 1923 with Ballspielverein Sportlust Borussia 1899 Schöneberg created Schöneberger FC Kickers 1900 which won promotion to the Oberliga Berlin-Brandenburg (I). BSV was the product of an earlier 1920 union between TuFC Sportlust 1904 and Schöneberger FC Borussia which had been formed 1 March 1899 as Berliner TuFC Borussia.

Kickers finished the 1926–27 campaign atop the Oberliga's Staffel B and played Hertha Berlin for the overall league title and were beaten (1:4, 2:6) although both clubs advanced to take part in the national playoffs. Kickers were eliminated in the quarterfinals by defending champion SpVgg Fürth (0:9), while Hertha continued on to the second of what would be six consecutive final appearances. The following season the Schöneberg team adopted the name Berliner Sportclub 1900 Kickers. In 1931, the team was bankrupted and on 1 July was reformed as Berliner SC Grün-Weiß-Rot. They were again named Kickers on 1 January 1934.

After World War II, occupying Allied authorities disbanded organizations throughout the country, including sports and football clubs. The membership became part of the community-based SG Schöneberg Nord and played in the Amateurliga Berlin (II). They re-adopted their historical identity as Kickers in 1949 and remained a second division club through most of the next two-and-a-half decades with single season appearances in the Oberliga Berlin (I) in 1953–54 and 1960–61. Descendant Kickers remain active today playing lower-tier football at the Kreisliga (IX-X) level.

In addition to playing football the original club fielded a cricket team. Thorball or Torball was a German word in use in the 1890s and early 1900s for the sport. Several early clubs playing the new "English" games of football, rugby, and cricket incorporated it into their name. The term never caught on and did not enter into common usage, although some clubs still carry the term as part of their names as part of their tradition. Today torball may refer to a form of football played by the blind or vision-impaired.
