= Berkan Algan =

German footballer

Personal information
- Date of birth: 29 March 1977 (age 49)
- Place of birth: Hamburg, Germany
- Height: 1.74 m (5 ft 9 in)
- Position: Midfielder

Senior career*
Years	Team	Apps	(Gls)
–1997	VfL Pinneberg		
1997–1998	1. FC Köln	0	(0)
1998	Bursaspor	5	(0)
1998–2000	FC St. Pauli	0	(0)
2000–2001	Hamburger SV	0	(0)
2001–2002	FC Haka	2	(0)
2002–2003	Concordia Hamburg	19	(7)
2003–2004	FC Schönberg 95	27	(2)
2004–2005	Concordia Hamburg		
2005–2007	Altona 93	44	(19)
2007–2008	FC St. Pauli II	49	(7)
2008–2009	Concordia Hamburg	31	(9)
2009–2010	Altona 93	22	(7)
2010–2011	Wedeler TSV	34	(8)
2011–2012	SV Halstenbek-Rellingen	17	(4)
2012	Germania Schnelsen	16	(1)
2012	FC Sylt	3	(1)
2012	ASV Bergedorf		
2013	Germania Schnelsen	2	(0)
2014	SV Lurup		

Managerial career
- 2015–2020: Altona 93
- * Club domestic league appearances and goals

Berkan Algan (born 29 March 1977) is a German former professional footballer who played as a midfielder.
