= VfL Nord Berlin =

German football club

- Full name: Verein für Leibesübungen Nord 1896 e.V.
- Founded: 1896/1947
- Dissolved: 1973
- League: defunct
Home colours	Away colours

VfL Nord Berlin was a German association football club from the city of Berlin. It was formed on 21 May 1947 in the aftermath of World War II as the successor to Berliner Fußball-Club Favorit which was established 15 October 1896 and was one of the founding clubs of the DFB (Deutscher Fussball Bund, en: German Football Association) at Leipzig in 1900.

== History ==
=== BFC Favorit ===
Sometime in 1904, FC Favorit was renamed Berliner Sport-Club Favorit. The team was primarily a lower-tier side and played just three seasons in the top-flight Oberliga Berlin in 1911–12 and 1917–19. In March 1933, Favorit was joined by the membership of Pankower SC 08 Adler, a left-leaning worker's club banned under the policies of the Nazis which led to the breakup of clubs with undesirable political or religious affiliations. The Pankow side were the 1928 champions of the ATSB (The Arbeiter-Turn- und Sportbund, en:Workers Gymnastics and Sports Federation), a leftist national sports organization which organized a football competition and championship separate from that of the DFB.

=== VfL Nord Berlin ===
Favorit was lost following World War II when occupying Allied forces banned most organizations across the country, including sports and football clubs, as part of the process of de-Nazification. New clubs soon emerged and the former membership of Favorit became part of the railworker's club Sportgruppe Nordbahn Berlin formed in 1945 and which was renamed VfL Nord Berlin on 21 May 1947. SG played a single season in the postwar Stadtliga Berlin, Staffel D (I) in 1945–46 before becoming part of the Landesliga Berlin (II) for the next two years. They captured a divisional title there in 1949 and advanced to the Oberliga Berlin (I). VfL was immediately sent down after a 12th-place result, but quickly bounced back after taking the first ever title of the newly formed Amateurliga Berlin (II) in 1951. That title earned the team a place in the opening round of the national amateur championship where they were put out 1:4 by eventual champions ATSV 1860 Bremen.

After another failed Oberliga campaign, Nord spent four of the next five seasons in Amateurliga play before slipping into lower-tier competition. They re-emerged into the now third tier Amateurliga Berlin in 1962 and were promoted to the Regionalliga Berlin (II) in 1968. The club had two unsuccessful turns at the Regionalliga level in 1968–69 and 1970–71, followed by a pair of poor Amateurliga seasons that ended with demotion in 1973.

On 1 June 1973, VfL merged with Berliner FC Nordstern to create Sportverein Nord-Nordstern Berlin. That club in turn joined SC Rapide Wedding on 1 July 2001 to form present-day club SV Nord Wedding 1893.

== Honours ==
The club's honours:

- Landesliga Berlin (II)
  - Champions: 1949
- Amateurliga Berlin (II)
  - Champions: 1951
