= Essener SV 99 =

Essener SV 1899
- Full name: Essener Sportverein 1899
- Founded: 1899
- Website: http://www.esg9906.com/

Essener Sportverein 1899 was a German association football club from the city of Essen, North Rhine-Westphalia. Established on March 23, 1899, it was the first club in the city and took part in top-flight regional Western German competition until the 1930s. Their best result came in the 1902/03 season when they finished as runners-up to Kölner FC. In 1926, they were joined by SC Essen, which was formed in 1923 as the football department of the gymnastics club TSV 1859 Essen. TSV was itself the product of the earlier 1919 union of BV Rhenania Essen and Turnverein 1859 Essen.

After the 1930s, Essener SV slipped into lower level local football competition. In 1974, they merged with BTLV Rheinland 1906 Essen, which had played as FC Rheinland 1906 Essen until 1965, to form Essen SG 99/06. Successor Essen SG is still active today as one of the larger sports associations in the city with departments for badminton, ice hockey, table tennis, and gymnastics. In the 2009/10 season, the footballers were promoted to the Fußballverband Niederrhein (VIII).
