= SC Teutonia Berlin =

German football club

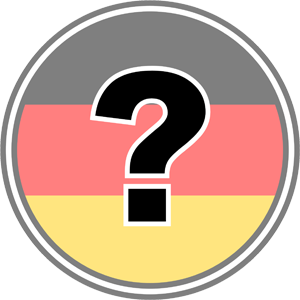
- Full name: Sport Club Teutonia 99 Berlin
- Founded: 1899
- Dissolved: 1944
- Ground: Sportplatz Frohnau
Home colours	Away colours

SC Teutonia Berlin was a German association football club from the city of Berlin. Established in 1899, the club was lost in 1944 in the late stages of World War II.

== History ==
The team first came to note following a merger with Berliner Sport Club Hansa 01 which was followed by its participation in the Märkische Meisterschaft, one of several first division circuits active in the city early in the 20th century. Teutonia earned consecutive seventh-place finishes over two seasons in 1908–10 before being relegated. In 1913, the club merged with VfV Berlin to play as VfV Teutonia 1899 Berlin.

In June 1933, VfV Teutonia was joined by Berliner FC Alliance-Colombia 08 (established 29 December 1908) in a short-lived merger as VfV Teutonia-Colombia 1899 Berlin. Alliance-Colombia was the product of the earlier 15 August 1928 union of SC Alliance 06 Berlin and Berliner FC Colombia 08. Many of the former members of Alliance-Colombia immediately left VfV in July 1933 to form Berliner FC Britannia. This was the start of a thread that over the course of six decades would see the tradition of that club become part of present-day side Weddinger FC Corso 99/Vineta. Their departure left VfV 1899 Berlin which was active from 1934 until it was lost in 1944.
