= 1903 German football championship =

1903 German championship
Deutsche Fußballmeisterschaft
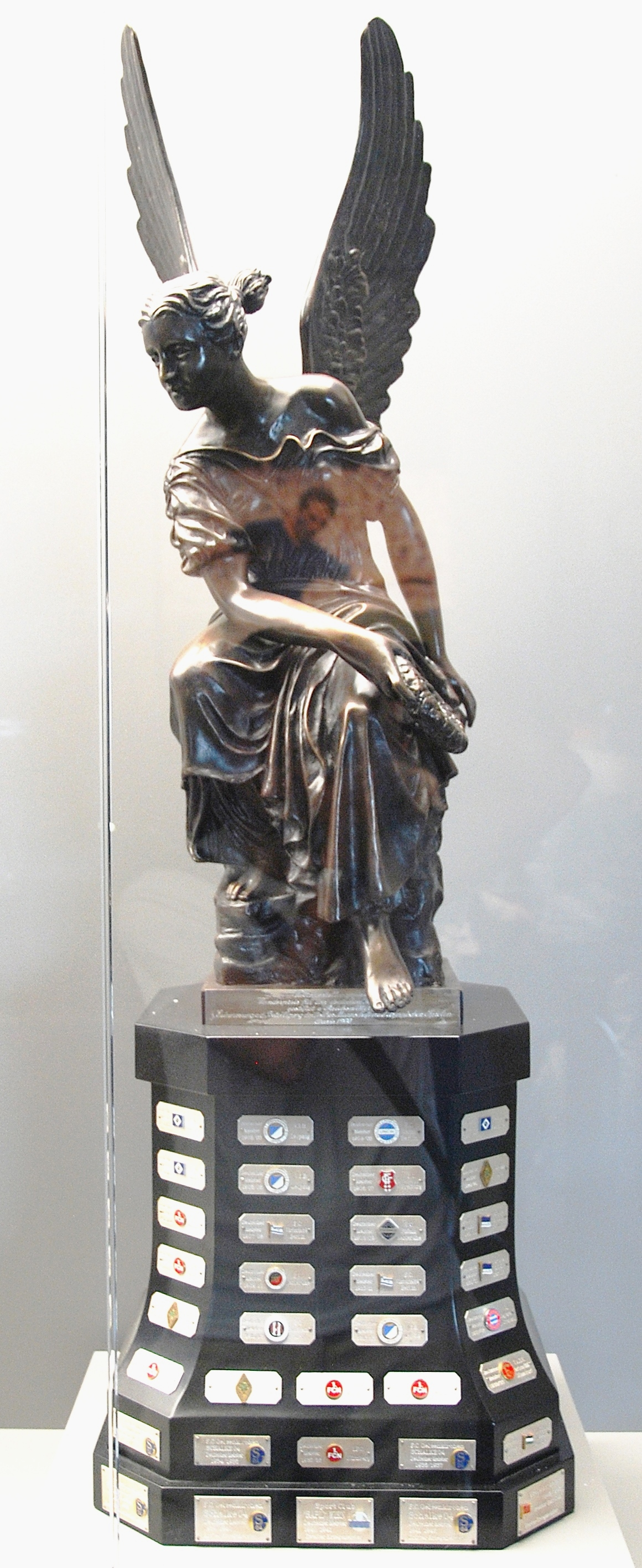
- Replica of the Viktoria trophy

Tournament details
- Country: Germany
- Dates: 3–31 May
- Teams: 6

Final positions
- Champions: VfB Leipzig; 1st German title
- Runner-up: DFC Prag

Tournament statistics
- Matches played: 4
- Goals scored: 31 (7.75 per match)
- Top goal scorer(s): Heinrich Riso; Bruno Stanischewski (6 goals each)

The 1903 German football championship was the first tournament sanctioned by the German Football Association (DFB) to crown a national champion. At the time, the newly founded DFB only had about 150 member clubs in 30 mostly local associations. Every champion of these associations was eligible for play in the championship. Additionally, associations from outside Germany were allowed to take part, such as the Prague association that sent her champion to Germany.

Although thirty teams would have been eligible, only six eventually entered the competition.

VfB Leipzig became the first club to be awarded the Viktoria, the trophy for the German champions from 1903 to 1944. The trophy later disappeared during the final stages of the Second World War, did not resurface until after the German reunification and was put on display at the DFB headquarters in Frankfurt until 2015, when it was moved to the new Deutsches Fußballmuseum in Dortmund.

== Qualified teams ==
The qualified teams:

Qualified team	Qualified from
DFC Prag	Prague representatives
Britannia Berlin	VBB champions
VfB Leipzig	Central German champions
Viktoria 96 Magdeburg	Magdeburg champions
FC Altona 93	HAFB champions
Karlsruher FV	Southern German champions

== Competition ==
=== Quarter-finals ===
3 May 1903 Quarter-final	Altonaer FC von 1893	8–1	SV Victoria 96 Magdeburg	Altona
	Bradanovic; Ploetz; Herder; Walter ?		Adam	Stadium: Exerzierwiese; Attendance: 200; Referee: Carl Perls

10 May 1903 Quarter-final	Britannia Berlin	1–3	VfB Leipzig	Berlin
	Müller 88'		Stanischewski 40', 47'; Riso 63'	Stadium: Sportpark Friedenau; Referee: Franz Behr

17 May 1903 Semi-final	DFC Prag	not played	Karlsruher FV	Munich

The German Football Association had scheduled the match to be played in Munich, but Prag lodged an official complaint as they would receive greater revenue if the match was played in Prague, while Karlsruhe protested against travelling Prague. Due to time constraints, the match was scratched and both teams entered the semifinals.

=== Semi-finals ===
17 May 1903 Semi-final	DFC Prag	walkover	Karlsruher FV	Leipzig
				Attendance: 200; Referee: Carl Perls

The match had been scheduled to be held in Leipzig, but Karlsruhe received a telegram, supposedly sent by the German Football Association, informing them that the match had been postponed. The team never went to Leipzig, and was subsequently disqualified.

17 May 1903 Semi-final	VfB Leipzig	6–3	Altonaer FC von 1893	Leipzig
	Stanischewski; Blüher; Riso		Walter; Herder; Bradanovic	Stadium: VfB-Platz Probstheida; Referee: Georg Demmler

=== Final ===
31 May 1903
16:45 CET

VfB Leipzig	7–2	DFC Prag
W. Friedrich 31'; A. Friedrich 49'; Riso 54', 71', 88'; Stanischewski 69', 85'	Report	Meyer 22', 65'

Exerzierweide, Altona
Attendance: 2,000
Referee: Franz Behr (Altona)
