= Hakoah Berlin =

German football club

- Full name: Sport-Club Hakoah Berlin
- Founded: 1905
- Ground: Greunewald-Sportzplatz im Jagen
- Capacity: 5,700
- League: defunct
Home colours	Away colours

Hakoah Berlin was a German association football club from the city of Berlin established 22 July 1905 as Sport-Club Hakoah Berlin. In 1929, Hakoah merged with Jüdischer Turnverein Bar Kochba Berlin (established 22 October 1898) to create Jüdischer Turn- und Sportverein Bar-Kochba-Hakoah.

The rise to power in Germany of the Nazis in the early 1930s led to discrimination against Jews and by 1933 Jewish teams were excluded from general competition and limited to play in separate leagues or tournaments. In 1938 Jewish teams were banned outright as discrimination turned to persecution and JTSV was lost.

In the aftermath of World War II Jewish sports and cultural associations eventually reemerged in Germany and SC Hakoah Berlin was reestablished 21 June 1945. On 28 April 1953, the club was renamed Spielvereinigung Vineta 05 Berlin.

SpVgg joined Corso 99 Berlin in 1972 to create SC Corso 99/Vineta Berlin which in turn merged with Weddinger FC 08 to form present-day side Weddinger FC Corso 99/Vineta.
