= SG Gesundbrunnen Berlin =

German football club

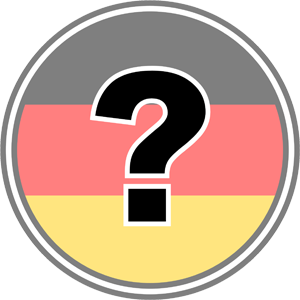
- Full name: Sportgruppe Gesundbrunnen
- Founded: 1945
- League: defunct
Home colours	Away colours

SG Gesundbrunnen Berlin was a short-lived postwar German association football club from the city of Berlin. Following World War II, occupying Allied authorities banned most organizations throughout the country, including sports and football clubs, as having been politically compromised under the Nazi regime. Many of these clubs soon re-emerged in the later half of 1945, with most being forced to abandon their previous identities and instead playing as local community-based clubs (Sportgruppe or Sportgemeinde). Sportgruppe Gesundbrunnen Berlin became the temporary home of the memberships of Hertha BSC Berlin and SV Norden-Nordwest Berlin playing in Hertha's ground at Plumpe in the city's Gesundbrunnen neighbourhood.

The team played the 1945–46 season as part of the Stadtliga Berlin (I) and the next season in the Landesliga Berlin (II) before slipping to lower level play. On 1 August 1949 the club disappeared with the reestablishment of Hertha and Norden-Nordwest as separate clubs under their historical identities.
