= Paul Fischl =

Austrian footballer

Personal information
- Full name: Paul Fischl
- Date of birth: 1 January 1880
- Place of birth: Prague, Austria-Hungary
- Date of death: 1960 (aged 80)
- Place of death: United Kingdom
- Position: Defender

Senior career*
Years	Team	Apps	(Gls)
- DFC Prag

International career
1908–1910	Austria	3	(0)
- * Club domestic league appearances and goals

Paul Fischl was an Austrian footballer who played as a defender. He played for DFC Prag in the inaugural German football championship in 1903, and also represented the Austria national football team on three occasions.
