= Moritz Göttel =

German footballer

Personal information
- Date of birth: 12 February 1993 (age 33)
- Place of birth: Braunschweig, Germany
- Height: 1.85 m (6 ft 1 in)
- Position: Forward

Team information
- Current team: Altona 93

Youth career
- 1998–1999: VfB Rot-Weiß 04 Braunschweig
- 1999–2007: Eintracht Braunschweig
- 2007–2010: VfL Wolfsburg
- 2010–2012: Borussia Mönchengladbach

Senior career*
Years	Team	Apps	(Gls)
2011–2012	Borussia Mönchengladbach II	14	(2)
2013	SV Babelsberg 03	5	(0)
2013–2015	VfL Bochum II	61	(12)
2015–2016	TSV Steinbach	18	(7)
2016–2018	SV Elversberg	52	(9)
2018–2021	TSV Steinbach	22	(6)
2021	→ Rot-Weiß Koblenz (loan)	26	(9)
2021–2023	VfV 06 Hildesheim	52	(30)
2023–2025	SV Drochtersen/Assel	51	(16)
2025	VfB Lübeck	14	(1)
2025–2026	Weiche Flensburg	17	(6)
2026–	Altona 93	14	(6)
- * Club domestic league appearances and goals as of 20 June 2026

Moritz Göttel (born 12 February 1993) is a German footballer who plays as a forward for Altona 93.

== Career statistics ==
As of 20 June 2015

Appearances and goals by club, season and competition
Club	Season	League			DFB-Pokal		Total	
Club	Season	Division	Apps	Goals	Apps	Goals	Apps	Goals
Borussia Mönchengladbach II	2010–11	Regionalliga West	2	0	—		2	0
Borussia Mönchengladbach II	2011–12	Regionalliga West	3	0	—		3	0
Borussia Mönchengladbach II	2012–13	Regionalliga West	9	2	—		9	2
Borussia Mönchengladbach II	Total		14	2	0	0	14	2
SV Babelsberg 03	2012–13	3. Liga	5	0	—		5	0
VfL Bochum	2013–14	2. Bundesliga	0	0	0	0	0	0
VfL Bochum II	2013–14	Regionalliga West	30	6	—		30	6
VfL Bochum II	2014–15	Regionalliga West	31	6	—		31	6
VfL Bochum II	Total		61	12	0	0	61	12
TSV Steinbach	2015–16	Regionalliga Südwest	0	0	—		0	0
Career total			80	14	0	0	80	14
