= Heinrich Riso =

German footballer (1882–1952)

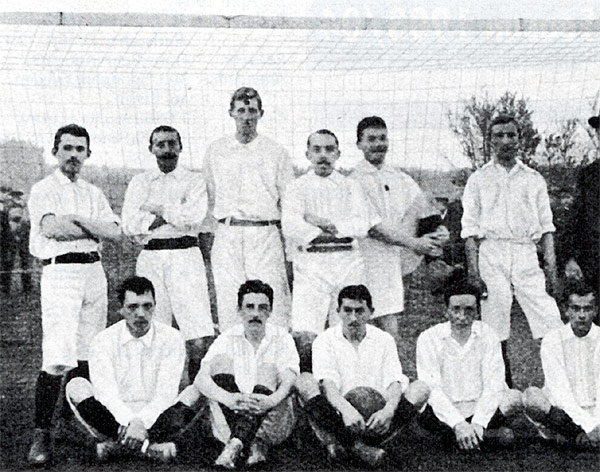
- Riso (seated, right) and teammates of VfB Leipzig in 1901

Personal information
- Full name: Heinrich Riso
- Date of birth: 30 June 1882
- Place of birth: Leipzig, Germany
- Date of death: August 1952
- Place of death: United States
- Position: Defender

Senior career*
| Years | Team | Apps | (Gls) |
| 1900–1912 | VfB Leipzig | | |

International career
| 1908–1909 | Germany | 2 | (0) |
- * Club domestic league appearances and goals

Heinrich Riso (30 June 1882 – August 1952) was a German footballer who played as a defender. He spent his entire career with VfB Leipzig, winning the inaugural German football championship with the club in 1903 and a further title in 1906. He also represented the Germany national team on two occasions, but could not play in Germany's first international match in 1908 because of an injury.

== Honours ==
- German football championship: 1903, 1906
- Central German champions: 1903, 1904, 1906, 1907, 1910, 1911
