= Adalbert Friedrich =

German footballer (1884–1962)

Personal information
- Full name: Adalbert Friedrich
- Date of birth: 10 June 1884
- Place of birth: Leipzig, Germany
- Date of death: 4 July 1962 (aged 78)
- Position: Forward

Youth career
- 1897–1900: VfB Leipzig

Senior career*
| Years | Team | Apps | (Gls) |
| 1900–1914 | VfB Leipzig | | |

International career
| 1910 | Germany | 1 | (0) |
- * Club domestic league appearances and goals

Adalbert "Bert" Friedrich (10 June 1884 – 4 July 1962) was a German footballer who played as a forward. He spent his entire career with VfB Leipzig, winning the inaugural German football championship with the club in 1903 and won two further titles in 1906 and 1913. He was called up to the Germany national team in a friendly against Belgium in 1910.

== Honours ==
- German football championship: 1903, 1906, 1913
