= Franz Sedlacek (footballer) =

Austrian footballer

Personal information
- Date of birth: 3 September 1892
- Date of death: 18 July 1933 (aged 40)

International career
Years	Team	Apps	(Gls)
1913–1918	Austria	11	(0)

Franz Sedlacek (3 September 1892 – 18 July 1933) was an Austrian footballer. He played in eleven matches for the Austria national football team from 1913 to 1918.
