= SV Norden-Nordwest =

German football club

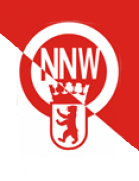
- Full name: Sportverein Norden-Nordwest 1898 e.V. Berlin
- Nickname(s): NNW
- Founded: 1898
- Ground: NNW-Platz
- Capacity: 3,000
- League: Kreisliga A Berlin Staffel 1 (IX)
- 2015–16: 8th
Home colours	Away colours

SV Norden-Nordwest is a German football club from Berlin. It was established as Berliner Fußball Club des Nordens on 16 October 1898 and in 1906 merged with Berliner Fußball Club Norden-West, also established in 1898, to play as FC Norden-Nordwest Berlin. The combined side immediately claimed the title in the Märkischer Fußball-Bund (MFB), an early Berlin-based circuit, before going out 1–9 to VfB Leipzig in the quarterfinals of the national championship. As FC des Norden the club had previously earned second place MFB finishes in 1903 and 1905.

== History ==
In 1907, a subsequent merger with Sportliche Verbindung Teutonia 1903 Schönholz formed Sportliche Verbindung Norden-Nordwest Berlin. This side again captured the Märkischer Fußball-Bund title in 1908 before losing a citywide final to Viktoria 89 Berlin (3–4). The team remained competitive through to the end of the decade before becoming part of the Oberliga Berlin in 1911. They found themselves overmatched there and slipped into second-tier play.

Norden-Nordwest returned to upper level play in 1917 and in 1922 finished first in the Oberliga – Staffel A. They won the division title by beating Union-SC Charlottenburg (4–2, 1–0) and advanced to the national playoffs. After a 1–0 quarterfinal victory over Viktoria Forst, they went out in the semifinal to 1. FC Nürnberg by the same score.

On 6 April 1922, the club took on the name Sportverein Norden-Nordwest Berlin and remained a fixture in the Oberliga Berlin-Brandenburg (I) throughout the 1920s and into the early 1930s. They enjoyed their greatest successes during this period. They finished first in Berlin's Staffel A again in 1924, but lost the overall division title to Alemannia 90 Berlin (1–3, 2–2). Two seasons later, they finished first in Staffel B and this time were beaten in the division final by Hertha BSC (0–7, 1–2). Despite that loss they took part in the national playoffs where they beat VfR Köln 2–1 in round of 16 matchup before losing 0–4 to Holstein Kiel in a quarterfinal contest. In addition to their appearances on the national stage SV twice captured the Berliner Landespokal (Berlin Cup).

SV Norden-Nordwest was a middling side over the next half dozen campaigns and did not qualify for the new Gauliga Berlin-Brandenburg, one of 16 regional first division circuits formed in the 1933 reorganization of German football under the Third Reich. The team made two failed attempts to win promotion in 1937 and 1941, but was never able to break through. In 1944–45, SV played alongside BFC Meteor 06 as part of the combined wartime side Kriegspielgemeinschaft BSC Meteor/NNW Berlin.

=== Postwar ===
Following the end of World War II, occupying Allied authorities banned most organizations throughout the country, including sports and football clubs, as part of the process of de-Nazification. The club's membership became part of Sportgruppe Gesundbrunnen Berlin alongside the membership of Hertha Berlin before both clubs re-emerged as separate sides on 1 August 1949. SG played two undistinguished seasons in the postwar Stadtliga Berlin (1945–46) and Landesliga Berlin (1946–47) before slipping to lower-level competition.

SV Norden-Nordwest appeared in second-tier play in the Amateurliga Berlin in 1957. They finished their 1958–59 campaign atop the division and advanced to the Oberliga Berlin (I) for a single season, but were immediately sent down. The following season in the Amateurliga also ended with relegation for NNW.

In 1999, the team advanced to Bezirksliga Berlin (VII) play and in 2006 joined the Landesliga Berlin (VI). The team competed as a mid-table side in the Landesliga, which became a 7th-tier league following the introduction of the 3. Liga in 2008. It was relegated from the Landesliga to the Bezirksliga in 2014 and to the Kreisliga A the following year.

== Honours ==
The club's honours:

- Märkischer Fußball-Bund
  - Champions: 1906, 1908
- Brandenburg football championship
  - Champions: 1922
- Berliner Landespokal
  - Winners: 1923, 1925
- Amateurliga Berlin
  - Champions: 1959
