= Berliner BC 03 =

German football club

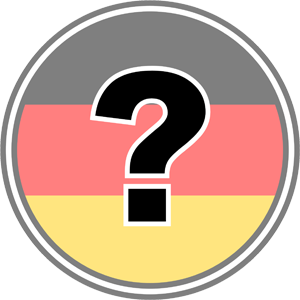
- Full name: Berliner Ballspiel-Club e.V.
- Founded: 1903
- Dissolved: 1921
- Ground: Chauseestraße/Markgrafenstraße
Home colours	Away colours

Berliner BC 03 was a German association football club from the city of Berlin. In the 1920s and 1930s, the club was known as BBC Brandenburg 92 Berlin and then FV Brandenburg 92 Berlin before eventually becoming part of a later side VfB Lichterfelde.

== History ==
The team was established 18 November 1903 and played in the Oberliga Berlin-Brandenburg (I) for nearly a decade. Sent down in 1905 after their first season in the top flight, BBC returned a year later and played as a middling side until just before the outbreak of World War I. They earned a second-place result in 1913 and then finished the 1913–14 campaign atop their division. That earned BBC a place on the national stage: they advanced to the semifinals where they were put out 3:4 by eventual German champions SpVgg Fürth.

During this period BBC made a string of Berliner Pokal (Berlin Cup) appearances, advancing to the final in 1907 and 1909. Both of these matches ended in defeat at the hands of Viktoria 89 Berlin (0:2, 0:4).

During the war BBC played four seasons (1914–18) alongside Berliner Turnverein von 1850 as Kriegsvereinigung Berlin with their best result coming as a second-place finish in 1915. The club was relegated at the end of the 1917–18 season and continued to compete as a lower-tier side. On 22 July 1921, they merged with Sportverein Brandenburg 92 Berlin to become Berliner Ballspiel-Club Brandenburg 92 Berlin, which played the 1924–25 season in the Oberliga Berlin. In 1926 they were briefly joined by Sportclub Brandenburg 1922 Berlin which broke away again that same year to form Berliner BC 1926.

In 1929 the club adopted the name Fußballverein Brandenburg 92 Berlin and in 1933 was joined by the membership of Fußball-Club Eintract Lankwitz. Following World War II, most organizations in the country, including sports and football clubs, were dissolved by occupying Allied authorities and FV briefly disappeared. The former membership was re-organized as Sportgemeinde Steglitz-Friedenau in 1945 before the club resumed its pre-war identity in 1950. On 4 June 1971, FV joined Fußball-Club 1912 Lichterfelde to become FV Brandenburg-Lichterfeld. On 2 June 1988 FV merged with Lichterfelder Sport-Union to create VfB, which merged with Viktoria Berlin in 2013 to become FC Viktoria 1889 Berlin.

== Honours ==
- Oberliga Berlin (I) champions: 1914
