= Adolf Riebe =

Austrian footballer and manager

Personal information
- Date of birth: 9 February 1889
- Place of birth: Vienna, Austria-Hungary
- Date of death: 3 May 1966 (aged 77)
- Place of death: Vienna, Austria
- Position: Midfielder

Senior career*
Years	Team	Apps	(Gls)
- Wien
- TV Jahn München
–1912	FA Bayern im Münchener SC		
1912–1915	SpVgg Fürth	33	(6)
1915–1919	Wiener AF		

Managerial career
- 1919–1921: Wiener AF
- 1921–1922: VfvB Ruhrort
- 1922–1923: Parma
- SG Andrea Doria
- 1925–1926: SpVgg Fürth
- 1926–1927: Hamburger SV
- 1930–1932: Strasbourg
- 1935–1937: Warta Poznań
- * Club domestic league appearances and goals

Adolf Riebe (9 February 1889 – 3 May 1966) was an Austrian football midfielder and manager.

Riebe played for Wien, TV Jahn München, FA Bayern im Münchener SC and SpVgg Fürth.

He later coached Wiener AF, VfvB Ruhrort, Parma, SG Andrea Doria, SpVgg Fürth, Hamburger SV, RC Strasbourg and Warta Poznań.
