= BSC Kickers 1900 =

- Full name: Berliner Sportclub Kickers 1900 e.V.
- Founded: 1900
- League: Kreisliga A Staffel 3 (IX)
- 2015–16: 7th
| Home colours | Away colours |

BSC Kickers 1900 is a German football club from the Schöneberg district of south central Berlin. The roots of the club are in the establishment of Berliner Thor- und Fußball Club Elf on 1 November 1900. This was followed by a series of mergers that led to the formation of Schöneberger FC Kickers 1900 in 1923 and the club's advance to first division play in the Oberliga Berlin-Brandenburg (I).

== History ==
=== Early mergers ===
From 1904 to 1906, predecessor BTuFC Elf was part of the Märkischen Meisterschaft, one of two competing top-flight city leagues, where they earned only lower table finishes. On 1 January 1912, they merged with Berliner Fußballclub Hubertus 05 (established 23 September 1905) to form Berliner Sport-Club Hubertuself. A subsequent merger with Ballspielverein Sportlust-Borussia 1899 Schöneberg in 1923 created Kickers. BSV was the product of an earlier 1920 union between TuFC Sportlust 1904 and Schöneberger FC Borussia which had been formed 1 March 1899 as Berliner TuFC Borussia.

=== Success through the 1920s ===
Schöneberger Kickers were a competitive side in the early 1920s, and after a second-place finish in Staffel B of the Oberliga Berlin-Brandenburg in 1925–26, followed up with a first-place result the next season. They lost the divisional final to Hertha BSC, but still advanced to the national level playoff. They beat Duisburger SV (5–4) in an eighth-final match-up, before being convincingly put out in the quarterfinals by defending national champions SpVgg Fürth (0–9). The team also took part in the 1927 Berliner Landespokal (Berlin Cup) where the advanced out of the quarterfinal by beating BV Luckenwalde (2–1) before being eliminated in the semifinals by BFC Viktoria 1889 (1–3).

The following season Kickers adopted the name Berliner Sport-Club 1900 Kickers. Their play slipped and after a 10th-place finish in 1931, the team was bankrupted and out of first division play. A new club called Berliner SC Grün-Weiß-Rot was quickly formed (1 July 1931) out of the ashes of the old, and it took on the name Kickers on 1 January 1934. The club remained an anonymous side in lower-tier city play over the next decade-and-half.

=== Postwar play ===
After World War II, occupying Allied authorities disbanded organizations throughout the country, including sports and football clubs. The former membership of Kickers became part of the community-based Sportgruppe Schöneberg Nord which took up play in the postwar Stadtliga Berlin in 1945–46 and the Amateurliga Berlin (II) in 1946–47. By 1949, SG re-adopted its historical identity as Kickers and in 1953 advanced to the Oberliga Berlin (I) for a single season on the strength of a second place Amateurliga result.

Following the formation of the top-flight Bundesliga in 1963, the Amateurliga became a third-tier circuit. Another second-place finish there in 1966 saw Kickers promoted to the Regionalliga Berlin (II) where they would remain for four seasons until being sent down in 1970. They made single-season appearances in Oberliga (IV) and Landesliga (V) in 1974 and 1996 respectively, but have since slipped to obscurity, descending through Bezirksliga to play most of the past four decades in the Kreisliga. Kickers are today part of the Kreisliga A (IX).
