= Karl Uhle =

German footballer (1887–1969)

Personal information
- Date of birth: 16 July 1887
- Place of birth: Leipzig, Germany
- Date of death: 12 October 1969 (aged 82)
- Place of death: Leipzig, Germany
- Position: Forward

International career
| Years | Team | Apps | (Gls) |
| 1912 | Germany | 1 | |

Heinrich Karl Uhle (16 July 1887 – 12 October 1969) was a German amateur footballer who played as a forward and competed in the 1912 Summer Olympics. He was a member of the German Olympic squad and played one match in the consolation tournament.
