= WFC Corso 99/Vineta =

German football club

- Full name: Weddinger Fußballclub Corso 99/Vineta e.V.
- Founded: 1899
- Ground: Sportplatz Ofener Straße
- Capacity: 1,500
- League: Kreisliga B Berlin Staffel 5 (X)
- 2015–16: 8th
Home colours	Away colours

WFC Corso 99/Vineta is a German association football club from the Wedding district of the city of Berlin. It is the product of the 1996 union of Sportverein Corso/Vineta and Weddinger Fußballclub.

== History ==
=== Corso 99 Berlin ===
Predecessor Berliner Sportclub Corso was established on 1 June 1899 in the city district of Prenzlauer Berg. In addition to football, the club had departments for athletics, billiards, and bowling. In 1905, they spent a single season in the Oberliga Berlin (I) and were relegated after a last place finish. Corso took part in the Berliner-Pokal (Berlin Cup) tournament in 1909 and advanced to the semi-finals where they were put out by Viktoria 89 Berlin. The club remained active in lower tier ball and in 1920 joined with SC Wacker Tegel to form Sportclub Wacker-Corso 99 Berlin in a brief merger that ended that same year. Corso made another single season appearance in the Oberliga Berlin/A in 1927–28.

Following World War II, occupying Allied authorities disbanded organizations throughout the country, including sports and football clubs. The team was reestablished as Sportgemeinde Prenzlauer Berg-Nord in 1945 and on 17 January 1949 took on the name SG Corso Berlin. On 14 June they joined BSG Eintracht Aschinger Berlin to play as BSG Eintracht 49 Corso Berlin. That was also a short-lived union and the two clubs went their own separate ways as SC Corso 99 Berlin and Sportverein Eintracht 49 Berlin on 14 January 1950. The raising of the Berlin Wall in 1961 had a significant impact on the club. Although based in the western part of the city, much of the club's membership lived in the east. Corso was reduced to a membership of just 17, but managed to carry on.

=== Mergers to present-day ===
On 2 June 1972 they merged with Spielvereinigung Vineta 05 Berlin, which prior to 28 April 1953 had played as Hakoah Berlin, to form SV Corso 99/Vineta Berlin. The current day club was formed 1 June 1996 through union with Weddinger FC 1908 which was the successor to SC Teutonia Berlin. Established in 1899, Teutonia brought together the traditions of a long list of early Berlin clubs.

Today the club plays in the tier ten Kreisliga B.
