= Georg Wunderlich =

German footballer

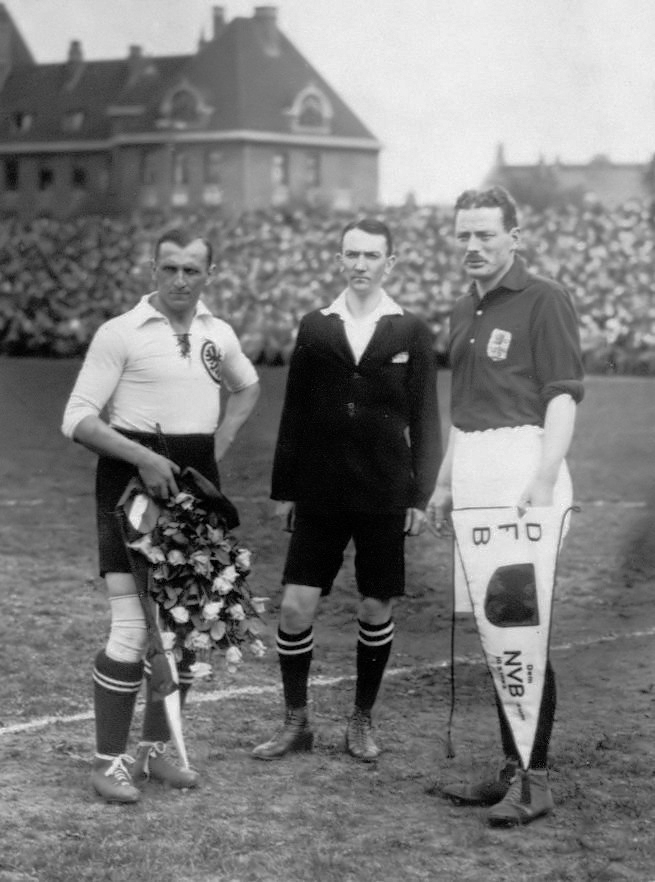
- Wunderlich, Björklund und Van der Kluft (1923)

Personal information
- Date of birth: 31 October 1893
- Date of death: 27 May 1963 (aged 69)
- Position: Forward

Senior career*
Years	Team	Apps	(Gls)
- TV 1860 Fürth
- Helvetia Bockenheim
- Stuttgarter Kickers

International career
1920–1923	Germany	5	(0)
- * Club domestic league appearances and goals

Georg Wunderlich (31 October 1893 – 27 May 1963) was a German footballer who played as a forward and made five appearances for the Germany national team.
