= Hermann Schweickert =

German footballer

Personal information
- Full name: Hermann Schweickert
- Date of birth: 14 November 1885
- Place of birth: Pforzheim, Germany
- Date of death: 24 August 1962 (aged 76)
- Position: Forward

Senior career*
Years	Team	Apps	(Gls)
1902–1912	1. FC Pforzheim		

International career
1909	Germany	1	(0)
- * Club domestic league appearances and goals

Hermann Schweickert (14 November 1885 – 24 August 1962) was a German international footballer who played for 1. FC Pforzheim. He was also capped once for the Germany national team in 1909.
