= Georg Wellhöfer =

German footballer

Personal information
- Date of birth: 16 March 1893
- Place of birth: Fürth, German Empire
- Date of death: 13 December 1968 (aged 75)
- Position: Defender

Senior career*
| Years | Team | Apps | (Gls) |
- SpVgg Fürth

International career
| 1922 | Germany | 1 | (0) |
- * Club domestic league appearances and goals

Georg Wellhöfer (16 March 1893 – 13 December 1968) was a German international footballer.
