= Willy Völker =

German footballer

Personal information
- Date of birth: 20 December 1889
- Position: Midfielder

Senior career*
Years	Team	Apps	(Gls)
- VfB Leipzig

International career
1914	Germany	1	(0)
- * Club domestic league appearances and goals

Willy Völker (born 20 December 1889, date of death unknown) was a German international footballer.
