= Paul Pömpner =

German footballer

Personal information
- Full name: Paul Pömpner
- Date of birth: 28 December 1892
- Place of birth: Weißenfels, Germany
- Date of death: 17 May 1934 (aged 41)
- Position: Forward

Senior career*
Years	Team	Apps	(Gls)
1908–1912	Wacker Halle		
1912–1930	VfB Leipzig		

International career
1924–1925	Germany	6	(3)
- * Club domestic league appearances and goals

Paul Pömpner (28 December 1892 – 17 May 1934) was a German international footballer who played for Wacker Halle and VfB Leipzig. He also played for the Germany national team on six occasions.
