= Eduard Pendorf =

German footballer (1892–1958)

Personal information
- Date of birth: 18 October 1892
- Place of birth: Bremerhaven, Germany
- Date of death: 3 November 1958 (aged 66)
- Position: Midfielder

Senior career*
Years	Team	Apps	(Gls)
1912–1932	VfB Leipzig		

International career
1913–1922	Germany	3	(0)
- * Club domestic league appearances and goals

Eduard Pendorf (18 October 1892 – 3 November 1958) was a German footballer who played as a midfielder for VfB Leipzig. In 1913 and 1922 he made three appearances for the Germany national team.
