= SV Nord Wedding 1893 =

German football club

- Full name: Sportliche Vereinigung Nord Wedding 1893 e.V.
- Founded: 1893
- Ground: Sportanlage Kühnemannstraße
- Capacity: 3,000
- League: Kreisliga Berlin B, Staffel 2 (X)
- 2015–16: 12th
Home colours	Away colours

SV Nord Wedding 1893 is a German association football club that plays in the Wedding district of the city of Berlin.

== History ==
Their complicated lineage includes a number of clubs and they can trace their roots back to some of the city's earliest football sides. Wedding's predecessors include two clubs which were part of the founding of the DFB (Deutscher Fussball Bund, en:German Football Association) at Leipzig in 1900 – Rapide 93 Berlin and Favorit 96 Berlin.

On 1 October 1893, a group of 17-year-old school boys formed a club they called Berliner FC Rapide Niderschönhausen. The team was also known as Berliner Tor- und Fußball Club Rapide or Berliner Fußball und Cricket Club – Berliner Football and Handball Club. This team is recognized as the "founding side" of the present day club. This club's growth was impeded throughout its early history by the lack of a home ground they could claim as their own.

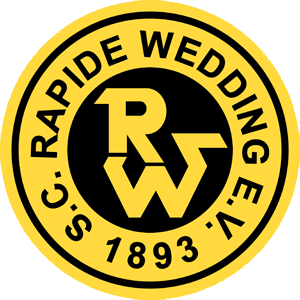
Logo of predecessor side SC Wedding-Rapide

In 1906 another club called Reinickendorfer BC was formed. This side merged with BFC Wedding (1914) to create SC Wedding (1914). Both Rapid and Wedding played within the various levels of football in Berlin until World War II. After the war the football and handball departments of this group of clubs came together as Sportgemeinschaft Schillerpark which was renamed SC Wedding in 1948. Two years later the club reached back to its origins to take on the name SC Wedding-Rapide 93.

The other thread of SV Nord Wedding's history begins on 15 October 1896 with the founding of Berliner Sport Club Favorit. Under the Nazi regime German football was re-organized. Politically undesirable blue collar worker's clubs were dissolved, often forced into mergers with other associations. In 1933 Favorit became home to the members of worker's league champions Pankower 1908 SC. After the war the club was re-formed and played as SG Nordbahn before being re-named VfL Nord in 1947. The construction of the Berlin Wall in 1961 effectively split up the club by isolating the Pankowers in the east, greatly reducing the side's strength. In response, what was left of Nord merged with BFC Nordstern 07 to form SV Nord-Nordstern 1896.

Finally, in 2001, SV Nord-Nordstern and SC Wedding-Rapide came together to form SV Nord Wedding 1893. For the 2025/26 season this successor side plays in the ninth tier Kreisliga Berlin A, section 1.

== Rapid Wien ==
- Austrian club SK Rapid Wien adopted their name from the founding club Rapide Berlin.
