= Western German football championship =

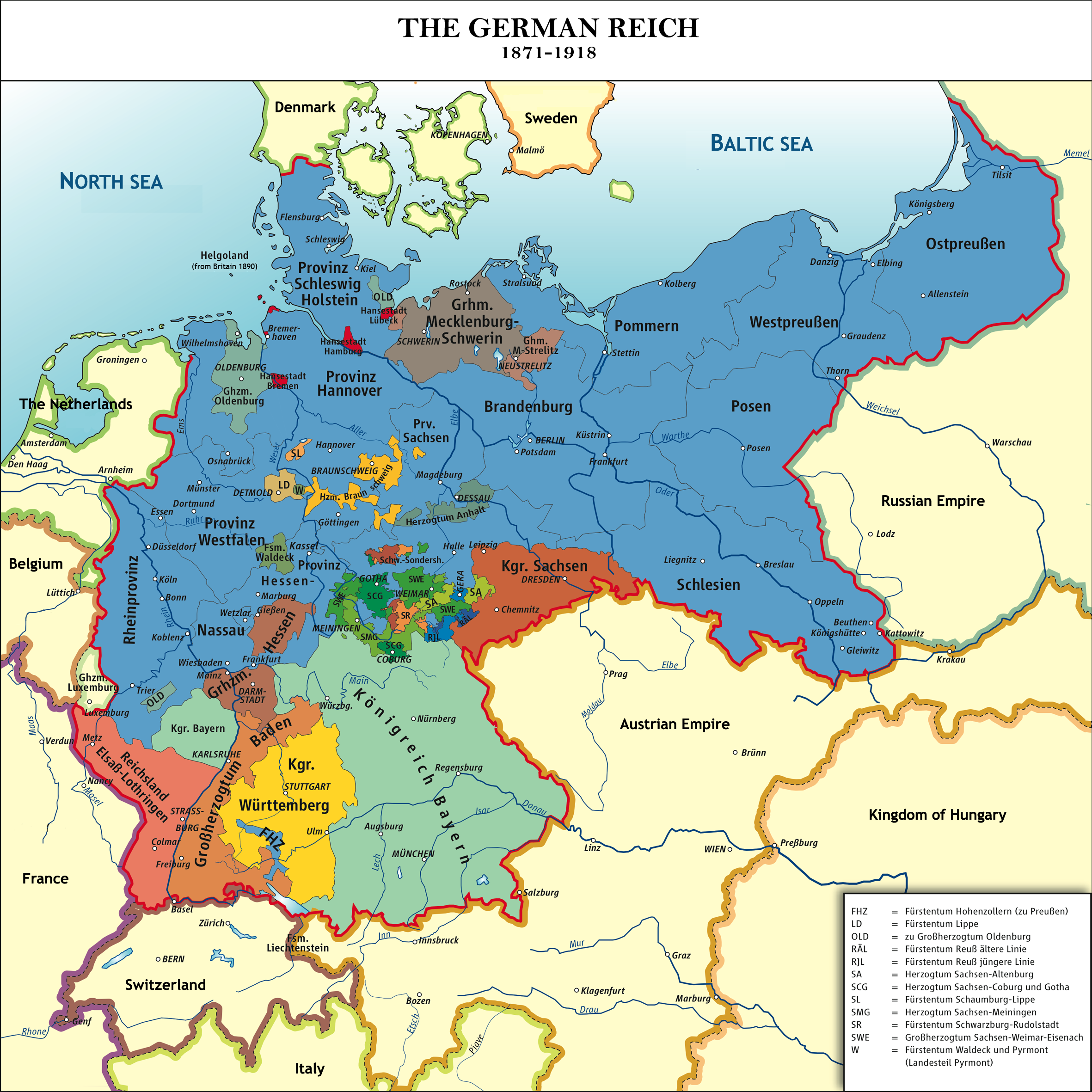
- Founded: 1903
- Folded: 1933 (25 seasons)
- Replaced by: Gauliga Hessen; Gauliga Mittelrhein; Gauliga Niederrhein; Gauliga Westfalen
- Country: German Empire; Germany
- Region: Western Germany
- Level on pyramid: Level 1
- Last champions: FC Schalke 04 (1932-33)

The Western German football championship (German: Westdeutsche Fußball Meisterschaft) was the highest association football competition in western Germany, in the Prussian Province of Westphalia, the Rhine Province, the northern parts of the province of Hesse-Nassau as well as the Principality of Lippe, later to become the Free State of Lippe. The competition was disbanded in 1933 with the rise of the Nazis to power.

It is not to be confused with the German championship in what was commonly referred to as West Germany from 1949 to 1990.

== Overview ==
German football was, from its beginnings, divided into regional associations, which carried out their own championship, which often pre-dated the national German championship. With the interception of the later in 1903, the former became qualifying tournaments for it but these regional championships still held a high value for the local clubs. These regional championships were:

- Southern German football championship - formed in 1898
- Brandenburg football championship - formed in 1898
- Central German football championship - formed in 1902
- Western German football championship - formed in 1903
- March football championship - existed from 1903 to 1911
- Northern German football championship - formed in 1906
- South Eastern German football championship - formed in 1906
- Baltic football championship - formed in 1908

All this regional championships were suspended with the rise of the Nazis to power in 1933. At the end of the Second World War, some resumed, now in league format. Others completely disappeared, like the Baltic championship, as the territories they were held in were not part of Germany any more. With the South West German football championship, a new regional competition also appeared in 1945. Ultimately, with the formation of the Fußball-Bundesliga, all this regional championships ceased altogether.

== History ==
=== Background ===
The Prussian Rhine Province (red), within the Kingdom of Prussia (yellow)

The Prussian province of Westphalia (red), within the Kingdom of Prussia (yellow)

When the Western German championship was established in 1903, the region of Western Germany (German: Westdeutschland) was politically divided into three territories, the first three being part of the Kingdom of Prussia:

- Hesse-Nassau, northern parts only, from 1906
- Rhine Province northern parts only
- Province of Westphalia
- Principality of Lippe

With the defeat of the German Empire in 1918 and the formation of a Republic, the former Kingdoms and Principalities became states. For the two Prussian provinces, this only meant that the Kingdom was replaced with the Free State of Prussia, while the Principality was transformed into the Free State of Lippe.

=== Football association ===
On 23 October 1898, the Rheinischer Spielverband was formed, initially without the clubs from the region around Kassel, who moved across in 1906. In 1900, the Rheinisch-Westfälischen Spielverband was formed, which, in 1907, was renamed Westdeutscher Spielverband.

== Competition ==
=== 1903 to 1914 ===
The Western German football championship was first contested in 1903 and won by the Cölner FC 1899. It consisted of three clubs, one each from Essen, Cologne and Mönchengladbach, then spelled München-Gladbach, and was determined in a group stage with home-and-away games. The winner of this first competition did not take part in the first edition of the national German championship.

To qualify for the Western German championship, a club had to take out the title in its regional competition or league. As more football clubs were formed in Germany, the number of leagues increased and thereby also the numbers of clubs taking part in the Western championship.

The second edition was played out in the same modus and its champion was permitted to enter the national finals for the first time. A round of deciders was necessary to determine the Western champion as all three clubs sat on equal points. In 1906, the championship was expanded to four clubs with a decider once more being necessary to determine the champion.

In 1907, the system to determine the Western champion was altered to a knockout modus with six clubs participating, increased to seven for the following year and eight in 1909. The championship continued to operate as a knockout competition in the following years, and, in 1913, Duisburger SV became the first club from the west to reach a national German final, losing 3–1 to VfB Leipzig, who thereby won a record third German championship. The Duisburger SV in turn was an early powerhouse of western football, continuing to win regional championships up until the late 1920s.

The last pre-First World War season, 1914, saw a return to the finals being played as a league with home-and-away games. Five clubs were meant to compete but Düsseldorfer SV was deemed to have been determined to late as local champions and it was barred from participating.

=== 1914 to 1919 ===
In 1914–15, football in Germany had come to an almost complete halt. As it became clear, that the war would last longer than anticipated, local competitions restarted in 1915. In most regions of Germany, like the South, the championships were restarted from 1915 onwards but in the West, this was not so. A Western German Championship was not played again until 1920.

=== 1920 to 1933 ===
As a consequence of the lost war, a strip of land along the German - Belgian border was awarded to the later, with the cities of Eupen and Malmedy becoming part of Belgium. These were the only territorial changes within the area of the Western championship.

The Western German championship was restarted in 1920 with eight clubs in a knockout system. The eight clubs represented the following regions:

- Berg/Mark
- Hesse/Hannover
- North Rhine
- Ruhr
- South Rhine
- South Westphalia
- Westphalia
- West Rhine

The following year, a return to a five-team group stage was made to determine the champion. In 1922, this was expanded to six clubs.

Western German football took a very different approach to its football championships from 1922 to 1924, expanded the local competitions to last over two years. The German championship still being an annual event, a Western championship was nevertheless needed in order to determine the club who would participate in the national finals. The seven top-of-the-table sides at the time therefore played a knockout competition to do so in 1923, something of an oddity. The 1924 championship, with seven clubs and a single round of games in a league format, was the proper Western German championship for 1922–24.

In 1925, a seven-team league was once more employed to determine the champion. The German championship had now been enlarged to sixteen clubs and for the West this meant, it could send three clubs to the national finals from now on.

Until 1928, the format of the Western championship did not change, but in 1929, the championship was enlarged to eight clubs in two groups of four. The two top-teams in each group then moved on to a four-team finals group. All games were played as single round, not home-and-away. This system remained in place until 1931.

In 1932 and 1933, eight clubs played in a knockout format once more. It was after this last edition of the Western championship, that the first German title went to the West, when Fortuna Düsseldorf beat FC Schalke 04 3–0. After 30 years of little national success, the clubs from the west, led by Schalke, would dominate the German championship from now on.

=== Aftermath ===
The Western German championship was replaced with four regional Gauligen by the Nazis in 1933, a quarter of the 16 new tier-one football leagues in the country. In the era that followed, the clubs from Western Germany saw a fast improvement in their performance, taking out twelve national championships until 1963.

After the end of the Second World War, Germany remained divided until 1991 and the new Oberliga West, formed in 1947, covered most of the heartland of the old Western German championship, being considered the successor to the later. The region of northern Hesse became part of the new Oberliga Süd instead, while the southern parts of the Rhine province became part of the new state of Rhineland-Palatinate and the Oberliga Südwest.

== Western German football champions ==
German champions in bold:

Season	Winner	Runner-Up	Result
1903	Kölner FC 1899	Essener SV 1899	N/A
1904	Duisburger SV	Bonner FV	N/A
1905	Duisburger SV	not determined	N/A
1906	Kölner FC 1899	Duisburger SV	3–2
1907	Düsseldorfer FC 1899	Casseler FV ^{3}	7–0
1908	Duisburger SV	FC München-Gladbach ^{2}	5–0
1909	FC München-Gladbach	Preußen Duisburg	3-2 aet
1910	Duisburger SV	Casseler FV	6–1
1911	Duisburger SV	Vfvb Ruhrort	3–0
1912	Cölner BC 1901	Borussia München-Gladbach	4–2
1913	Duisburger SV	Arminia Bielefeld	declared
1914	Duisburger SV	Preußen Münster	N/A
1915	not held		
1916	not held		
1917	not held		
1918	not held		
1919	not held		
1920	VfTuR München-Gladbach	Cölner BC 01	3–1
1921	Duisburger SV	Kölner BC 01 ^{2}	N/A
1922	Arminia Bielefeld	Kölner BC 01	N/A
1923 ^{4}	Arminia Bielefeld	TuRu Düsseldorf	4-3 aet
1924	Duisburger SV	Arminia Bielefeld	N/A
1925	Duisburger SV	Schwarz-Weiß Essen	declared
1926	VfR Köln	BV Altenessen	N/A
1927	Duisburger SV	FC Schalke 04	N/A
1928	SpVgg Sülz 07	Preußen Krefeld	N/A
1929	FC Schalke 04	Duisburger SV	2–1
1930	FC Schalke 04	VfL 06 Benrath	2–1
1931	Fortuna Düsseldorf	VfB Bielefeld	N/A
1932	FC Schalke 04	Borussia Fulda	5–1
1933	FC Schalke 04	**Fortuna Düsseldorf**	1–0

- ^{1} From 1950 onwards, München-Gladbach was spelled as Mönchengladbach.
- ^{2} From 1920 onwards, Cöln was spelled as Köln.
- ^{3} From 1926 onwards, Cassel was spelled Kassel.
- ^{4} Not an official championship.

=== Winners and runners-up of the Oberliga West (1947–63) ===
The Oberliga West, formed in 1947, is considered to be a continuation of the Western German football championship. It only included teams from the newly formed state of North Rhine-Westphalia and was disbanded with the introduction of the Fußball-Bundesliga in 1963. This event marked the end of the Western German football championship.

Season	Winner	Runner-Up
1947–48	Borussia Dortmund	Sportfreunde Katernberg
1948–49	Borussia Dortmund	Rot-Weiß Essen
1949–50	Borussia Dortmund	Preußen Dellbrück
1950–51	FC Schalke 04	Preußen Münster
1951–52	Rot-Weiß Essen	FC Schalke 04
1952–53	Borussia Dortmund	1. FC Köln
1953–54	1. FC Köln	Rot-Weiß Essen
1954–55	**Rot-Weiß Essen**	SV Sodingen
1955–56	**Borussia Dortmund**	FC Schalke 04
1956–57	**Borussia Dortmund**	Duisburger SV
1957–58	**FC Schalke 04**	1. FC Köln
1958–59	Westfalia Herne	1. FC Köln
1959–60	1. FC Köln	Westfalia Herne
1960–61	1. FC Köln	Borussia Dortmund
1961–62	**1. FC Köln**	FC Schalke 04
1962–63	1. FC Köln	**Borussia Dortmund**

Source: "Oberliga West". Das deutsche Fussball-Archiv.

- **Bold** denotes team went on to win German championship.
