= Johannes Schneider =

German footballer

Personal information
- Full name: Johannes Schneider
- Date of birth: 5 August 1887
- Place of birth: Leipzig, Germany
- Date of death: 8 September 1914 (aged 27)
- Position: Goalkeeper

Senior career*
Years	Team	Apps	(Gls)
- VfB Leipzig

International career
1913	Germany	2	(0)
- * Club domestic league appearances and goals

Johannes Schneider (5 August 1887 – 8 September 1914) was a German international footballer who played for VfB Leipzig. He was also capped twice for the Germany national team in 1913.

Called to military service at the start of World War I, Schneider was killed in action on 8 September 1914 in Vitry-le-François, France.
