= DFC Prag =

Defunct German-Jewish association football club in Prague

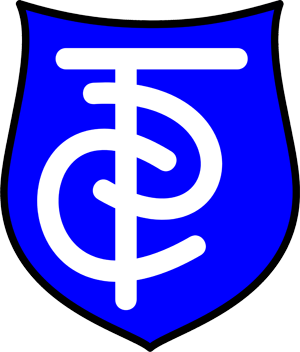
- Historical club logo
- Full name: Deutscher Fußball-Club Prag z.s.
- Founded: 25 May 1896; 130 years ago 9 June 2016; 10 years ago
- Dissolved: 1939
- Ground: Stadion Belvedere (Historical)
- Capacity: 18,000
- Chairman: Jan Kašpárek
- Website: http://www.dfcprag.com/
Home colours	Away colours

The Deutscher Fußball-Club Prag, commonly known as DFC Prag, was a football club based in Prague. The club was founded on 25 May 1896 by a group of German Jews in Prague, which at the time of its founding was the capital of the Kingdom of Bohemia in Austria-Hungary. DFC Prag was one of the strongest teams in Europe in the beginning of the 1900s. The team took part in the 1903 German football championship final and became Bohemian champions several times. The club was dissolved in 1939, following the occupation of Czechoslovakia by Nazi Germany. A new DFC Prag was founded on 9 June 2016, in the tradition of the original club.

== History ==
=== Founding member of the German Football Association ===
The multi-national character of Austria-Hungary meant that footballers in the monarchy could find themselves playing in the leagues of Germany, Austria, Hungary or Bohemia. It was common for sports clubs to be founded based on the shared ethnicity of their members. DFC Prag was founded on 25 May 1896, by a group of German Jews from the football department of Deutscher Eis- und Ruder-Club Regatta Prag, established in 1891.

When it was formed in 1900, the German Football Association (DFB), actively sought out members among ethnically German clubs from outside of the country. DFC Prag was a founding member of the German association and its president, Dr. Ferdinand Hueppe, became the first president of this new national association.

=== Contesting Germany's first championship ===
DFC Prag was a very strong side at the end of the 1800s and early 1900s: they were Bohemian champions in 1896, and played in Germany's first ever national final in 1903, and became again Bohemian champions in 1917.

The story of the team's appearance in the 1903 final is an odd one as they got there without having to play the scheduled semi-final match against Karlsruher FV. The opponents received a telegram, supposedly from the DFB, indicating that the game had been rescheduled and consequently did not travel to the appointed match-up. DFC Prag, already waiting in Leipzig for the arrival of Karlsruher FV, were declared the winners by forfeit and advanced to the final, over the loud protests of the opponents. To this day the origin of the telegram is unknown. The second team to advance to the final was VfB Leipzig, and the match was scheduled for 31 May 1903 at the home ground of FC 93 Altona in Hamburg.

The heavily favoured DFC Prag arrived in Hamburg a day in advance and took themselves off on an ill-advised pub crawl the night before the final. Most of the team were students at the Charles University in Prague and took the opportunity to explore Hamburg. And so the team arrived to the final in less than ideal shape. The match was delayed half an hour as officials scrambled to find a football that was in good enough condition to play the match. The Altona club provided a new ball and eleven minutes in DFC Prag scored the first goal. At the end of the half, the score stood at 1–1, but VfB Leipzig then pulled away to emerge as the first German champions with a 7–2 victory. VfB Leipzig later the same year agreed to challenge Karlsruher FV and were again victorious, this time by a 7–3 score.

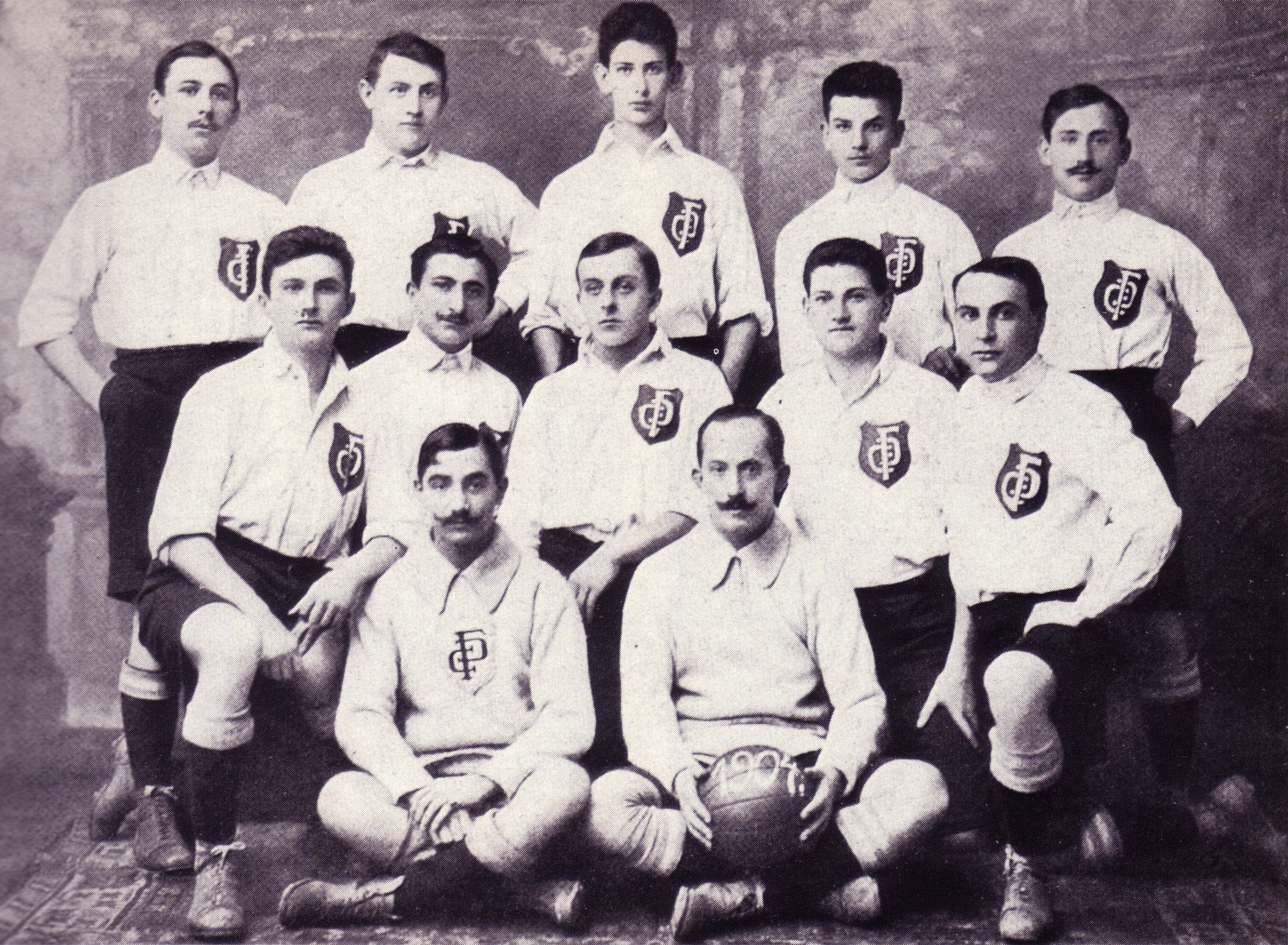
DFC Prag in 1904: Fischer – Sedlaczek – Dr. Fischl – Meissner – Weil; Schwarz – Österreicher – Kurpiel – Dr. Frey – Robicek; Eisenstein – Pick

=== Play outside of Germany and dissolution ===
When Germany joined FIFA in 1904, DFC Prag was no longer eligible for play in the country. FIFA also rebuffed attempts to create ethnic German and Slavic football associations within the borders of the fractious Austro-Hungarian Empire, preferring to stay clear of politics. DFC Prag played variously in Austria, Hungary, and Bohemia and remained a strong side until about 1914. The club sent a number of players to the Austria national team in spite of the club's uncertain status. DFC Prag dominated the Sudeten league in the ethnically German area of Czechoslovakia, and in the period immediately prior to World War II, the club won a pair of amateur championships, in 1931 and 1933.

The rise to power of the Nazis in Germany in the early 1930s led to discrimination against Jews. By 1933, Jewish teams were excluded from general competition and limited to play in separate leagues or tournaments. In 1938, Jewish players and teams were banned outright as discrimination turned to persecution.

With the annexation of the Sudetenland by Germany in 1938, these policies were quickly imposed in the area. DFC Prag, its players and officials, were, despite their mostly Jewish descent, suggested to join the movement of Konrad Henlein, the Sudeten German Party. As players and officials refused, the club was immediately banned as a "Jewish club" after the German seizure of Prague in 1939, and dissolved due to the ban. Already in the years before, the players had felt the hostility from the Nazis, especially during matches against teams from German-dominated Sudetenland.

After the German occupation of Czechoslovakia, some Jewish players from DFC Prag fled abroad. Others were arrested by the Nazis and sent to concentration camps, where many of them died. Jewish football players Fritz Taussig, a former long time goalkeeper of DFC Prag, and Egon Reach, also a former player of DFC Prag, were both sent to the Theresienstadt concentration camp and eventually murdered in the Holocaust.

In 1933 German football was re-organized under the Third Reich into sixteen top-flight leagues known as Gauligen. As other countries or regions came under German control, new leagues were formed, such as the Gauliga Ostmark in Austria after the Anschluss and the Gauliga Sudetenland after the seizure of the area from Czechoslovakia.

The remains of DFC Prag and FC Deutscher Sportbrüder Prag were merged in 1940, into a politically acceptable side under the regime, known as Nationalsozialistische Turngemeinde Prag, commonly known as NSTG Prag. The team began play in the 1940–41 Gauliga Sudetenland Group 2, where they won the division and the league championship, leading to participation in the 1941 German football championship and the 1941 German Cup. The next season they participated in the Gauliga Sudetenland-Mitte, where they again won the division, leading to participation in the 1942 German Cup. However, the club voluntarily withdrew from participation in the national championship or further Gauliga play. The team disappeared with the end of World War II.

=== Refounding ===
A refounding of the club after World War II would have been hopeless, as a decree by Czechoslovak President Edvard Beneš in 1945 forced Germans to leave Czechoslovakia and have their assets confiscated but in July 2016, 77 years after the original German-Jewish club had been dissolved, a new DFC Prag was founded with the aim of establishing a youth department, followed by a senior team in the following years.

== Stadium ==
DFC Prag played its first matches at a sports field on the so-called Königswiese. The Königswiese, which later came to be known as the Kaiserwiese (Císařská louka in Czech), is a man-made island on the Vltava River, in the district of Smíchov in Prague. The sports field was also used by other football teams, and was the site of the first derby between SK Slavia Prague and AC Sparta Prague in 1896.

However, the club was soon to find itself a new home at the underdeveloped Letná area. For this purpose, the club tore up a tent in the southeastern corner of Letná Park and built a sports field, which in addition to a fence also had a covered grandstand. The stadium was named Stadion Belvedere and came to hold 18,000 spectators. The club played at the stadium until it was demolished in 1937 to make space for the National Agricultural Museum. The National Agricultural Museum still occupies the site today, with the National Technical Museum situated directly opposite.

== Honours ==
- German Champions
  - Runners-up: 1903
- Bohemian Champions: 1896, 1913, (Note: The Bohemian Championship was organized by the German Football Association for Bohemia (DFVfB) (de). The DFVfB was founded in 1911 and was an autonomous member of the Austrian Football Association (ÖFV) until the end of the First World War.) 1914
- Regional Champions (de): (Note: The Regional United Championship for the Kingdom of Czech of the ÖFB (Czech: Mistrovství krajského svazu pre Království České OeFV) was a common championship for Czech and German clubs in the Kingdom of Bohemia organized by the Czech branch of the Austrian Football Association (ÖFB). The Competition was only held in 1917.) 1917
- Czechoslovak Amateur Champions: 1931, 1933
- DFVfB Champions in the ČSAF (Note: The German Football Association for Bohemia (DFVfB) became a subdivision of the Czechoslovak Football Association (ČSAF) in 1923.): (10) 1923, 1924, 1926, 1927, 1928, 1929, 1931, 1932, 1933, 1937
