= Oberliga Berlin-Brandenburg =

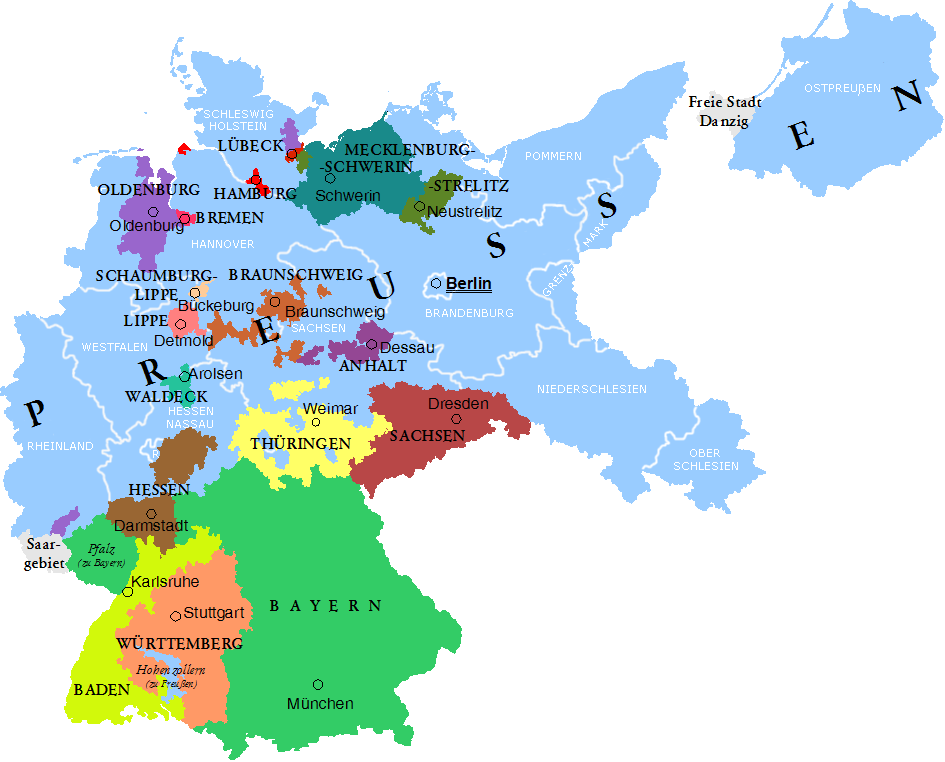
- Organising body: Verband Brandenburgischer Ballspielvereine (VBB)
- Founded: 1923; 102 years ago
- Folded: 1933; 92 years ago
- Replaced by: Gauliga Berlin-Brandenburg
- Country: Germany
- Province: Province of Brandenburg
- Level on pyramid: Level 1
- Domestic cup: Berlin Cup
- Last champions: Hertha BSC Berlin (1932–33)

The Oberliga Berlin-Brandenburg, also known as the VBB-Oberliga, was the highest association football competition in the Prussian Province of Brandenburg, including Berlin, from 1923 to 1933. The competition was disbanded in 1933 with the rise of the Nazis to power.

== History ==
The league was organized by Verband Brandenburgischer Ballspielvereine (VBB) and formed in 1923, after a league reform which was decided upon in Darmstadt, Hesse.

Until the introduction of the Oberliga, the Verbandsliga Berlin-Brandenburg was the highest league in the state. This league had been formed after the First World War.

The Oberliga, like the Verbandsliga before, consisted of two divisions of ten clubs each who would determine their champions in a home-and-away format. The two divisional champions would then play for the Brandenburg championship in a two-game series. Should each team win one game, a third game was held as a decider.

The Brandenburg champion would then continue on to play in the German football championship. From 1925 onwards, the runners-up of Brandenburg was also qualified for an enlarged national championship.

Below the league, as the second division in Brandenburg, four Kreisligas were set, those being:

- Kreisliga Brandenburg Nordkreis
- Kreisliga Brandenburg Westkreis
- Kreisliga Brandenburg Ostkreis
- Kreisliga Brandenburg Südkreis

From 1925 onwards, until 1931, the league was dominated by Hertha BSC Berlin, who won it every season in this time. Hertha, after reaching the semi-finals of the national championship in 1925, played in each of the German final games from 1926 to 1931, a record only matched by FC Schalke 04 from 1937 to 1942. Unlike Schalke, who won four of those finals and only lost two, Hertha lost the first four to win the last two.

The league and its modus did not change at all until 1930, when, on 18 January, the clubs from the western part of Pomerania joined the Brandenburg football championship, but not the Oberliga. This meant, instead of two or three final games between the two divisional champions, a four team finals tournament was introduced in 1931, consisting of the two Oberliga division winners, the Pomeranian champion and the Berlin Cup winner.

The 1932 edition saw the end of an era; Hertha only came second in its division and was therefore not qualified for the Brandenburg championship. The tournament was held with only three clubs, the Berlin Cup winner, incidentally Hertha, did not take part.

Hertha returned in 1933 to win the last championship of the Oberliga and Brandenburg. The club's golden age had come to an end, however, as evident by the fact that it bowed out in the first round of the German championship to un-heralded SV Hindenburg Allenstein, which in turn was beaten 12-2 by Eintracht Frankfurt in the second round.

With the rise of the Nazis to power, the Gauligas were introduced as the highest football leagues in Germany. In Brandenburg, the Gauliga Berlin-Brandenburg replaced the Oberliga as the highest level of play. The eleven best teams from the league qualified for this new single-division league. A twelfth team, the SV Cottbus-Süd, came from the Bezirksliga Niederlausitz.

== Champions ==
Season	Division A	Division B	Game 1	Game 2	Game 3
1924	Norden-Nordwest Berlin	**BFC 90 Alemannia**	2-2	1-3	—
1925	**Hertha BSC Berlin**	BFC 90 Alemannia	3-1	3-2	—
1926	**Hertha BSC Berlin**	Norden-Nordwest Berlin	7-0	2-1	—
1927	**Hertha BSC Berlin**	BSC Kickers 1900	4-1	6-2	—
1928	**Hertha BSC Berlin**	Tennis Borussia Berlin	3-1	1-2	4-0
1929	**Hertha BSC Berlin**	Tennis Borussia Berlin	1-0	0-1	5-2
1930	**Hertha BSC Berlin**	Tennis Borussia Berlin	3-1	2-0	—

Season	Division A	Division B	Pomerania	Berlin Cup
1931	**Hertha BSC Berlin**	Tennis Borussia Berlin	Polizei SV Stettin	Berliner SV 92
1932	SC Minerva 93	**Tennis Borussia Berlin**	Stettiner SC	N/A
1933	**Hertha BSC Berlin**	BFC Viktoria 89	Stettiner SC	Berliner SV 92

- Winners in **bold**.
