= Altonaer FC von 1893 =

German football club

Altona 93
- Full name: Altonaer Fußball-Club von 1893 e. V
- Nickname: AFC
- Founded: 1893; 133 years ago
- Ground: Adolf-Jäger-Kampfbahn
- Capacity: 8.000
- Chairman: Dirk Barthel
- Coach: Andreas Bergmann
- League: Oberliga Hamburg (V)
- 2025–26: Regionalliga Nord, 18th of 18 (relegated)
- Website: http://www.altona93.de/

Altonaer FC von 1893, commonly known as Altona 93 and abbreviated to AFC, is a German association football club based in the Altona district of the city of Hamburg. The football team is a department of a larger sports club which also offers handball, karate, table tennis, and volleyball.

== History ==
Late in the nineteenth century, a number of sports having their origins in England – including cricket, rugby, and football – were introduced to continental Europe where they enjoyed considerable popularity. This club was founded on 29 July 1893 as Altonaer Cricketclub by a group of students who also demonstrated an early interest in football. In 1894, the club was renamed Altonaer Fussball und Cricket Club and then Altonaer Fussball Club in quick succession.

Altona is one of Germany's oldest football clubs: they were part of the Altona-Hamburg football league formed in 1894, as well as one of the founding clubs of the German Football Association (Deutscher Fussball Bund or German Football Association) at Leipzig in 1900. In 1903 at their home ground, they hosted the first-ever German national championship final played between VfB Leipzig and DFC Prague. The match was refereed by AFC player Franz Behr, who also served as the vice-chairman of the newly formed DFB until 1904. The club rescued the match by providing a new ball when the original one proved to be unsuitable for play. The hosts of the country's first title match never won or even played in a national final, being able to advance only as far as the semi-finals in 1903 and 1909, and the quarter-finals in 1914.

In 1919, the club merged with Altonaer TS 1880 in a union that lasted until 1922, during which time they were known as VfL Altona. After the break-up the team played as Altonaer FC 1893 VfL. Another merger in 1938 with Borussia 03 Bahrenfeld created Altonaer FC 93 Borussia. Between the end of World War I and the end of World War II the team played continuously in the country's top-flight leagues. Under the Third Reich German football was re-organized into sixteen Gauliga and AFC played first in the Gauliga Nordmark, and later in the Gauliga Hamburg.

After the war the club picked up play in the Stadtliga Hamburg before earning promotion to the first tier Oberliga Nord. Their best results were a pair of third-place finishes in 1954 and 1958, and semi-final appearances in the DFB-Pokal (German Cup) in 1955 and 1964. After the formation of the Bundesliga – Germany's new professional league – in 1963, Altona found itself in the second-tier Regionalliga Nord where they played until 1968. Between 1969 and 1981 Altona played third and fourth division ball before slipping to Landesliga Hamburg-Hammonia (V). They returned to using their old name, Altona FC, in 1979.

The club has moved up and down between the third and fifth tiers since the mid-1980s. In 1997, they found they were unable to sustain themselves financially in the Regionalliga Nord (IV) and after a single season at the professional level voluntarily withdrew to lower league play. The club is currently again playing in the Regionalliga Nord after promotion in 2019.

== Recent seasons ==
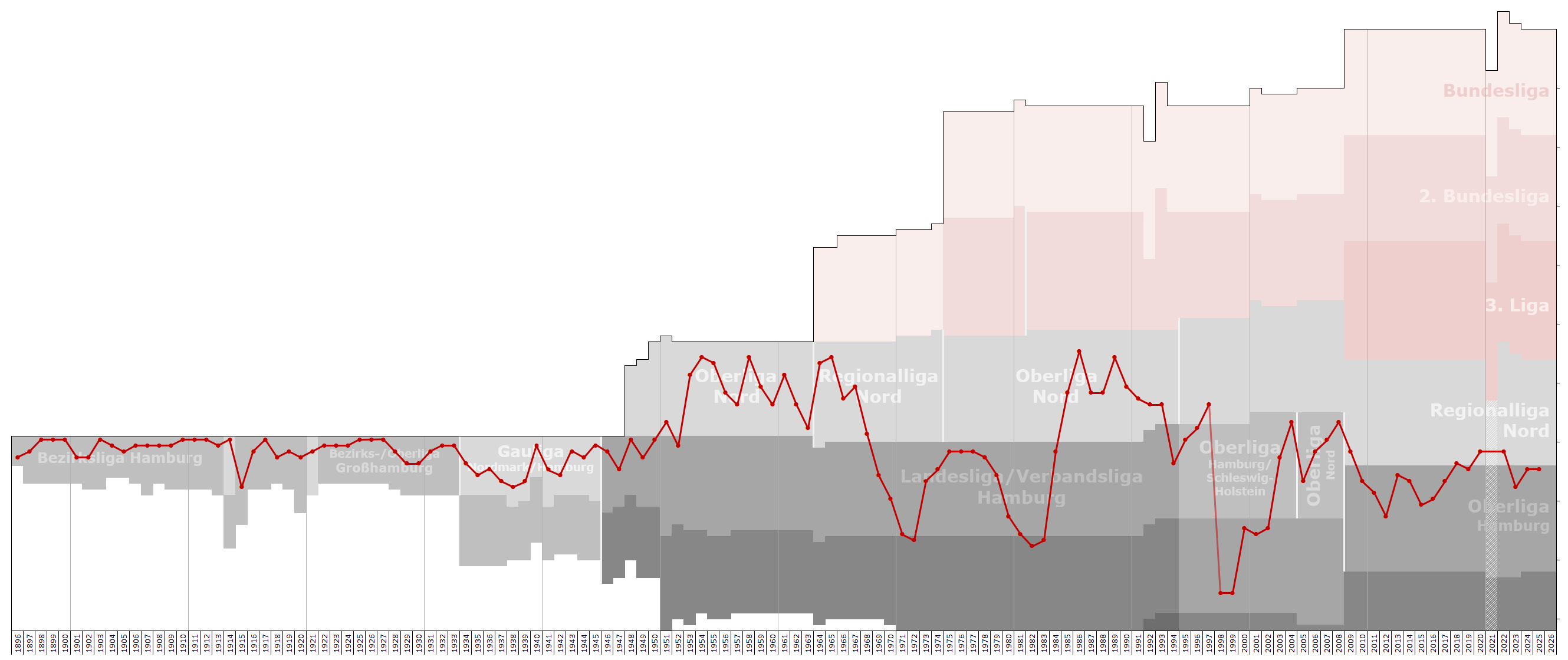
Historical chart of Altonaer FC league performance

Year	Division	Position
1999–2000	Verbandsliga Hamburg (VI)	2nd
2000–01	Verbandsliga Hamburg	3rd
2001–02	Verbandsliga Hamburg	2nd ↑
2002–03	Oberliga Hamburg/Schleswig-Holstein (V)	8th
2003–04	Oberliga Hamburg/Schleswig-Holstein	2nd ↑
2004–05	Oberliga Nord (IV)	12th
2005–06	Oberliga Nord	7th
2006–07	Oberliga Nord	5th
2007–08	Oberliga Nord	2nd
2008–09	Regionalliga Nord (IV)	16th ↓
2009–10	Oberliga Hamburg (V)	3rd
2010–11	Oberliga Hamburg	5th
2011–12	Oberliga Hamburg	9th
2012–13	Oberliga Hamburg	2nd
2013–14	Oberliga Hamburg	3rd
2014–15	Oberliga Hamburg	7th
2015–16	Oberliga Hamburg	6th
2016–17	Oberliga Hamburg	3rd ↑
2017–18	Regionalliga Nord	18th ↓
2018–19	Oberliga Hamburg	1st ↑
2019–20	Regionalliga Nord	16th
2020-21	Regionalliga Nord	11th
2021-22	Regionalliga Nord	19th ↓
2022-23	Oberliga Hamburg	4th
2023-24	Oberliga Hamburg	1st (Note: Lost in Promotion Play-offs.)
2024–25	Oberliga Hamburg	1st ↑
2025-26	Regionalliga Nord	18th ↓

Key

↑ Promoted	↓ Relegated

== Current squad ==
As of 5 February 2026

Note: Flags indicate national team as defined under FIFA eligibility rules; some limited exceptions apply. Players may hold more than one non-FIFA nationality.

No.	Pos.	Nation	Player
1	GK	GER	Dennis Lohmann
2	DF	GER	Deniz Hasan Yilmaz
3	DF	GER	Abdul Saibou
4	DF	GER	Emmanuel Ntsiakoh
5	DF	USA	Josh Redfield
6	MF	GER	Elmin Mekic
7	MF	GER	Pascal El-Nemr
8	MF	GER	Minou Tsimba-Eggers
9	FW	GER	Moritz Göttel
10	MF	GER	Gianluca Przondziono
11	DF	GER	Moritz Grosche
12	GK	GER	Nikolas Wulff
13	DF	GER	Marcell Sobotta
14	FW	GER	Nils Brüning

No.	Pos.	Nation	Player
15	GK	GER	Michel Dorow
16	DF	GER	Stephan Wemakor
17	DF	GER	Rasmus Tobinski
18	MF	GER	Niklas Jovanovic
19	FW	GER	Lesley Karschau
20	MF	GER	Bendix Gelzer
21	FW	GER	Keenon Erfurth
22	DF	GER	Michael Ambrosius
23	DF	GER	Gideon Baur
24	MF	GER	Philip Stefaniuk
25	FW	ALB	Veli Sulejmani
27	FW	GER	Emmanuel Appiah
61	MF	GER	Tayfun Can

== Honours ==
The club's honours:

- Northern German football championship
  - Champions: 1909, 1914
- Oberliga Hamburg/Schleswig-Holstein (IV)
  - Champions: 1996
- Verbandsliga Hamburg (II)
  - Champions: 1948, 1950
- Landesliga Hamburg-Hansa (IV)
  - Champions: 1972
- Landesliga Hamburg-Hammonia (V)
  - Champions: 1983
- Hamburger Pokal
  - Winners: 1984, 1985, 1989, 1994

== Stadium ==
Since 1909 the team has played in the AFC-Kampfbahn, renamed the Adolf-Jäger-Kampfbahn (AJK) in 1944. Jäger was killed trying to defuse an Allied bomb in Altona while working as a volunteer in a bomb squad, within weeks of the stadium-naming ceremony honouring him. The facility has a capacity of 8,000 spectators (1,500 seats). Germany's first national championship was played at the club's original grounds, Exerzierweide, in Altona's Bahrenfeld quarter (known today as Schnackenburgallee) on 31 May 1903.

The stadium was featured as a stop during the German leg of The Amazing Race 16, an American television program, in which participants had to kick footballs through targets.

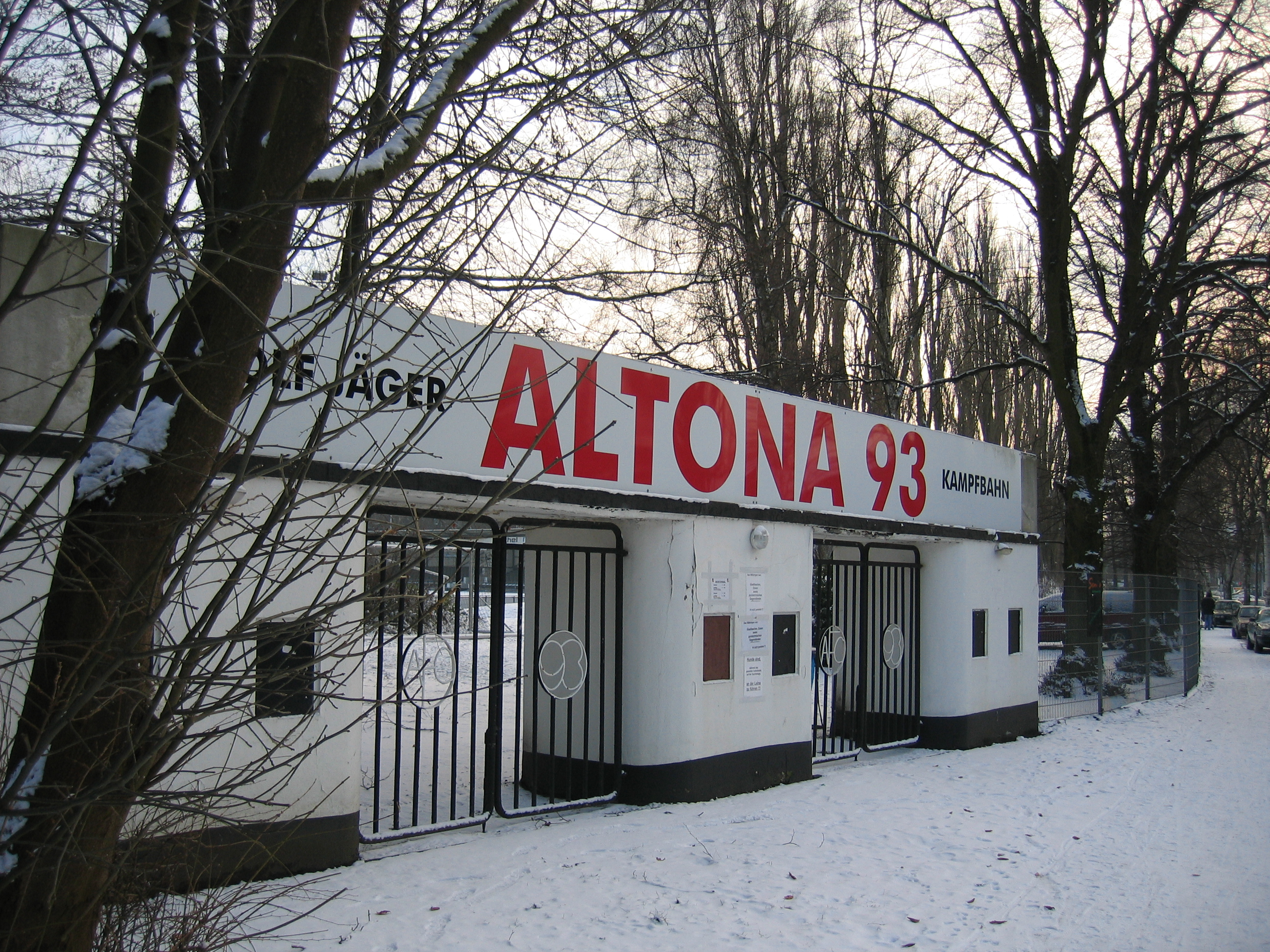
Main entrance

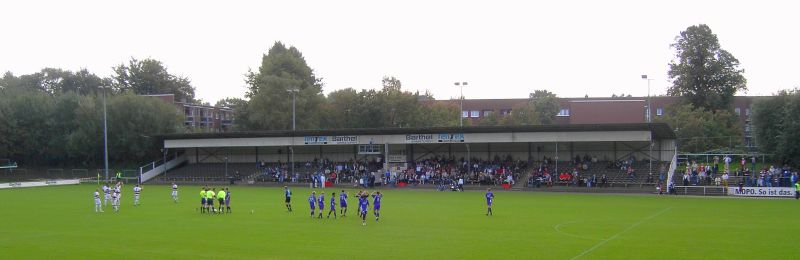
Main bridge

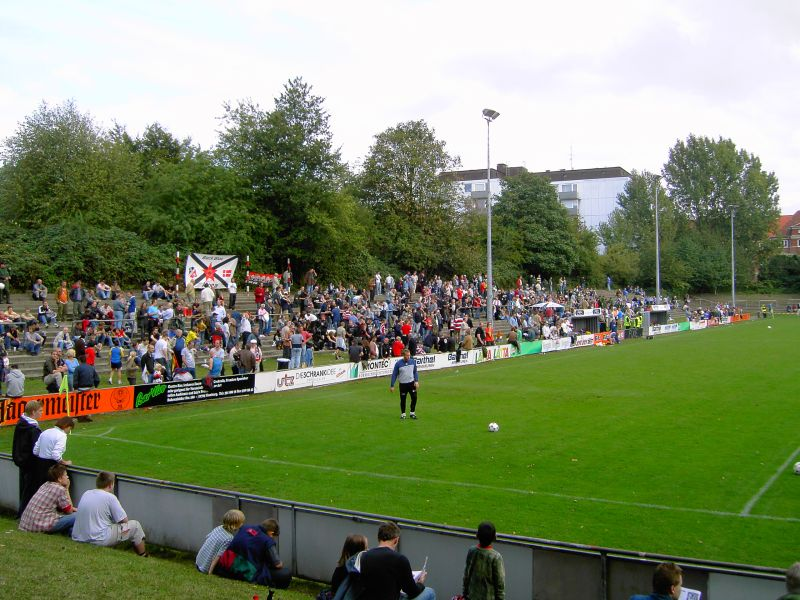
back straight
