= Brandenburg football championship =

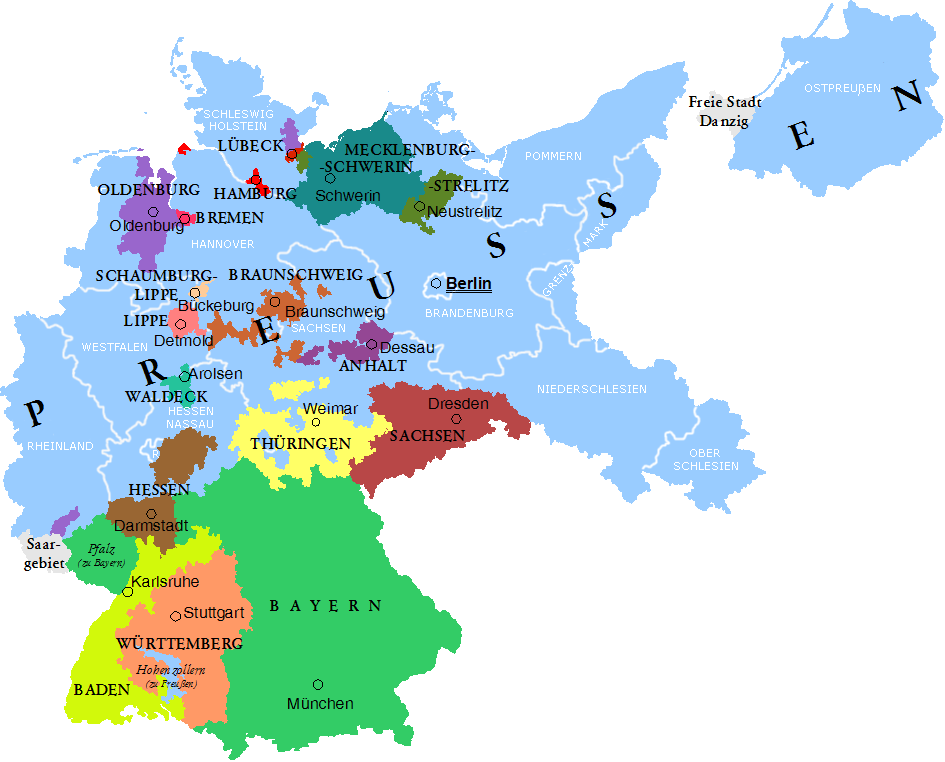
- Founded: 1898; 128 years ago
- Folded: 1933; 93 years ago
- Replaced by: Gauliga Berlin-Brandenburg
- Country: German Empire Germany
- Province: Province of Brandenburg
- Level on pyramid: Level 1
- Domestic cup: Berlin Cup
- Last champions: Hertha BSC (1932–33)

The Brandenburg football championship (German: Brandenburgische Fußball-Meisterschaft) was the name of highest association football competition in the Prussian Province of Brandenburg, including Berlin, established in 1898. The competition was organized by various regional football associations between 1898 and 1933. The last incarnation of the competition was the VBB-Oberliga. The competition was disbanded in 1933 with the rise of the Nazis to power.

== Overview ==
German football was, from its beginnings, divided into regional associations, which carried out their own championship, which often pre-dated the national German championship. With the interception of the later in 1903, the former became qualifying tournaments for it but these regional championships still held a high value for the local clubs. These regional championships were:

- Southern German football championship – formed in 1898
- Brandenburg football championship – formed in 1898
- Central German football championship – formed in 1902
- Western German football championship – formed in 1903
- March football championship – existed from 1903 to 1911
- Northern German football championship – formed in 1906
- South Eastern German football championship – formed in 1906
- Baltic football championship – formed in 1908

All this regional championships were suspended with the rise of the Nazis to power in 1933. At the end of the Second World War, some resumed, now in league format. Others completely disappeared, like the Baltic championship, as the territories they were held in were not part of Germany any more. With the South West German football championship, a new regional competition also appeared in 1945. Ultimately, with the formation of the Fußball-Bundesliga in 1963, all this regional championships ceased altogether.

== History ==
=== Background ===
The Prussian province of Brandenburg (red), within the Kingdom of Prussia (blue)

The Prussian province of Brandenburg was largely identical to what is now the federal state of Brandenburg, except for the areas east of the Oder-Neisse line, which are now part of Poland. Berlin was separated politically from the province in 1881 and significantly enlarged in size through the Greater Berlin Act of 1920. Clubs from city of Berlin were part of, and indeed, dominated the Brandenburg football championship. The outcome of the First World War and change of Prussia to a Free State had little influence on the competition as, unlike other regions of Germany, Brandenburg did not lose any territory.

=== Early Berlin-Brandenburg football associations ===
In the late 1890s, a number of local football associations were formed in the Berlin and Brandenburg region, most of them short lived. In the earliest days of football in the country, Berlin was the center of growth of the sport and some of the champions of these associations held themselves to be "national champions" before the formation of the DFB (Deutscher Fußball Bund, en: German Football Association) and the emergence of a widely recognized German championship in the early 1900s. In 1933, associations throughout the country, including those in Berlin, were disbanded under the Nazi regime and reorganized into 16 regional leagues, or Gauligen, playing for a single national championship. Separate workers' and faith-based competitions active in Berlin were also absorbed into the new leagues.

Formed	Active until	League name	Comments	Notable clubs
4 November 1890	14 February 1892	Bund Deutscher Fussballspieler	Germany's first football league	BFC Germania 1888
18 November 1891	1902	Deutscher Fussball-und Cricket-Bund	football and cricket	BFC Viktoria 1889
1894	1895	Thor- und Fussball-Bund Berlin	football and cricket (thorball)	BFC Borussia
November 1894	1898	Allgemeiner Deutscher Sport Bund		BFC Preussen, Berliner SC 1895/96
11 September 1897	18 May 1902	Verband Deutscher Ballspielvereine		BSC Fortuna 1894, BFC Preussen
24 August 1900	1903	Freie Berliner Fussballvereinigung		BFC Norden-West, Rapide 93 Berlin
18 May 1902	29 April 1911	Verband Berliner Ballspielvereine	formerly the Verband Deutscher Ballspielvereine	
1903	29 April 1911	Märkischer Fussball Bund	formerly the Freie Berliner Fussball-Vereinigung	BFC Hertha 92
22 March 1904	10 May 1933	Verband Berliner Athletik Vereine		SC Teutonia Berlin
1 January 1905	1910	Berliner Ballspiel-Bund		FC Spandau 06
26 January 1908	10 May 1933	Fussball-Verband Mark Brandenburg		
29 April 1911	10 May 1933	Verband Brandenburgischer Ballspielvereine	merger of the Verband Berliner Ballspielvereine and the Märkischer Fussball-Bund	

The Verband Deutscher Ballspielvereine, a Berlin-based association of German football clubs was formed on 11 September 1897. In May 1902, it was renamed as the Verband Berliner Ballspielvereine to reflect its geographical alignment.

From 1903 to 1911, the Märkischer Fußball-Bund, named after the Mittelmark, existed in parallel with the Verband Berliner Ballspielvereine and both sent their champions to the German football championship. In April 1911, the two associations merged to form the Verband Brandenburgischer Ballspielvereine.

In 1933, after the rise of the Nazis to power, the Verband Brandenburgischer Ballspielvereine was disbanded, like all other regional football associations in Germany.

=== Competition ===
==== 1898–1911 ====
The Brandenburg football championship was first played in 1898, when eight clubs competed in a league format for it. The number of games played by each team varied greatly but the top four clubs each played nine season games with the top three ending up on equal points. To determine the champion, a two leg decider was played between Britannia Berlin and BFC Preussen with the former winning both games and earning its first league title. In its second edition, only six clubs participated, all from the city of Berlin and this time each club played an equal number of games. Because of the top two teams finishing on equal points, a final had to be played once more, this time BFC Preussen coming out the winner.

Expanded to nine clubs for 1900, the league champion won the Brandenburg title outright at this edition, BFC Preussen winning all of its 16 games. The following season, only seven clubs took part in the competition but for 1902 it was expanded to twelve teams in two divisions of six, with the two divisional winners playing out the Brandenburg champions. The finals were held in a two leg format but because each team won one game, a third match had to be held to decide the winner. For 1903, the league returned to a single division format, now with eight clubs. Additionally, the league received some local competition with the March football championship being introduced, organised by the rival Märkischer Fußball-Bund. Also, the German football championship was held for the first time, with the Brandenburg champion, Britannia Berlin, losing 1–3 against VfB Leipzig, who went on to win the title.

Unchanged in format and modus, the league winner was once more Britannia Berlin with the club reaching the final of the German championship, too. Because of a protest by the Karlsruher FV, who had lost 1–6 to Britannia in the first round in Berlin and rightfully claimed all games were supposed to be staged on neutral ground, the final in Kassel was canceled hours before the game.

In 1905, the Union 92 Berlin took out the title in a competition that remained otherwise unchanged from the previous two seasons and then went on to become the first club from Berlin to win a German championship, beating Karlsruher FV in the final. The 1906 edition saw BFC Hertha 92, the later Hertha BSC, win the league and become one of three Berlin clubs in the German finals, alongside defending champions Union 92 and the March league winner SV Norden-Nordwest, without any of the three making it to the final.

In 1907, the league winners of the Verband Berliner Ballspielvereine and the Märkischer Fußball-Bund agreed on playing a one-off final for an overall Berlin championship, which BFC Viktoria 1889 won. Viktoria then went on to reach the German final but lost to southern champions Freiburger FC. The following year saw almost a complete repeat but this time Viktoria won the German final, beating Stuttgarter Kickers 3–0.

The 1909 season saw an expansion of the league to nine clubs and a refusal of the Verband Berliner Ballspielvereine to stage a Berlin final for financial reasons; it did not want the Märkischer Fußball-Bund to profit financially from the games. Because of this, both league champions were allowed at the German finals but Viktoria lost 2–4 to Phönix Karlsruhe in the final game. In 1910, the two rival leagues continued their stand-off and the March champion, SC Tasmania 1900 Berlin, actually reached the semi-finals of the national championship while BFC Preussen was knocked out in the first round.

The 1911 season was the last of the split, the situation remaining unchanged during the season and Viktoria taking out the Brandenburg and German title. At the end of it, the two associations merged and formed the Verband Brandenburgischer Ballspielvereine.

==== 1911–1924 ====
With only one football association in the region, made up of two leagues, the Brandenburg championship was staged in 1912 in two divisions of ten clubs each with a two-leg final between the league winners at the end. In the final years before the First World War the Brandenburg champions could not reach a German final again and from 1914 to 1920, the German championship was suspended in any case. On local level, the league returned to a single division of ten clubs in 1913 and kept this format until 1917.

In 1918 and 1919, the league was expanded to 18 clubs, an extraordinary number in German football in those days when most leagues were at a strength of ten to twelve teams. Brandenburg did not, unlike most other German regions, interrupt play during the war and continued its competition. The 1920 season was an oddity, only half completed when Union Oberschöneweide was declared the winner.

The 1921 edition saw a return to a more common format with two divisions of six clubs each, with a two-leg final at the end. Brandenburg champion Vorwärts Berlin reached the German final, losing 0–5 to 1. FC Nürnberg. The two division were expanded to eleven clubs in one and ten in the other for 1922 and, with Union Potsdam, contained a club from outside of Greater Berlin for the first time. For 1923, both divisions operated on a strength of ten clubs, now renamed Oberliga Berlin-Brandenburg, and champions Union Oberschöneweide reached the national final, losing 0–3 to Hamburger SV. After an unchanged 1924 season, from 1925 onwards the league saw the rise of Hertha BSC as a dominating team in Brandenburg and Germany.

==== 1925–1933 ====
Hertha BSC was to win the league seven consecutive times from 1925 to 1931, the last four of those by beating Tennis Borussia Berlin in the final, laying the foundations to a still existing rivalry. While the club bowed out of the German finals in the semi-finals of 1925 against FSV Frankfurt, losing 0–1 in extra time, it also dominated German football in this era, to a lesser extent. Hertha reached the final of every German championship from 1926 to 1931, losing in 1926, 1927, 1928 and 1929, to SpVgg Fürth, 1. FC Nürnberg, Hamburger SV and Fürth again.

From 1925, an expanded finals round also meant that Brandenburg was allowed to send the championship finalist to the national title games as well. The Brandenburg championship was again split into two divisions of ten teams from 1926, with finals at the end, a format it maintained until 1933. From 1931, the Pommeranian champions, previously part of the Baltic football championship, took part in a four-team final round that also included the Berlin Cup winner.

After four unsuccessful attempts, Hertha finally won a national title in 1930, beating Holstein Kiel 5–4 in the final. The season after, it repeated this achievement by beating TSV 1860 Munich 3–2.

The 1932 season saw the end of Hertha's seven-year run; the club came second in its division and missed out on taking part in the Brandenburg finals. This title was won by Tennis Borussia Berlin, for the first time after four unsuccessful attempts in series; but Eintracht Frankfurt stopped TB in the quarter-finals of the national title games.

The last Brandenburg championship in 1933 was won by Hertha BSC once more, but the club's golden age had gone and it made a first-round exit to SV Hindenburg Allenstein at the national finals.

=== Aftermath ===
The Brandenburg championship was replaced with the Gauliga Berlin-Brandenburg by the Nazis in 1933, one of 16 new tier-one football leagues in the country. In the era that followed, the clubs from Brandenburg had little success and none ever reached a German championship final again until the introduction of the Fußball-Bundesliga in 1963, which did away with the finals games altogether.

A competition similar to the Brandenburg football championship never reformed. After the end of the Second World War, Germany remained divided until 1991 and the former clubs of this competition played in separate countries. Clubs from both parts of Berlin played in the same competition, the Oberliga Berlin until 1950, but it did not include clubs from the rest of Brandenburg. After the reunion, the clubs from what was East Germany joined the united German football league system, but a competition that only includes clubs from Brandenburg and Berlin was not recreated.

== Brandenburg football champions ==
German champions in Bold:

**Season**	**Winner**	**Runner-Up**
1898	Britannia Berlin	BFC Preussen
1899	BFC Preussen	BFC Viktoria 1889
1900	BFC Preussen	BFC Viktoria 1889
1901	BFC Preussen	BFC Viktoria 1889
1902	BFC Viktoria 1889	Britannia Berlin
1903	Britannia Berlin	BFC Viktoria 1889
1904	Britannia Berlin	BFC Viktoria 1889
1905	**Union 92 Berlin**	BFC Preussen
1906	Hertha BSC	BFC Preussen
1907	BFC Viktoria 1889	BFC Alemannia 90 ^{1}
1908	**BFC Viktoria 1889**	SV Norden-Nordwest ^{1}
1909	BFC Viktoria 1889	BFC Preussen
1910	BFC Preussen	BFC Viktoria 1889
1911	**BFC Viktoria 1889**	BFC Preussen
1912	BFC Preussen	BFC Viktoria 1889
1913	BFC Viktoria 1889	Berliner BC 03
1914	Berliner BC 03	Hertha BSC
1915	Hertha BSC Berlin	Berliner BC 03

**Season**	**Winner**	**Runner-Up**
1916	BFC Viktoria 1889	Hertha BSC
1917	Hertha BSC	Union Oberschöneweide
1918	Hertha BSC	BFC Berolina 1885
1919	BFC Viktoria 1889	SV Norden-Nordwest
1920	Union Oberschöneweide	Wacker 04 Berlin
1921	Vorwärts Berlin	BFC Preussen
1922	SV Norden-Nordwest	SCC Berlin
1923	Union Oberschöneweide	Vorwärts Berlin
1924	BFC Alemannia 90	SV Norden-Nordwest
1925	Hertha BSC	BFC Alemannia 90
1926	Hertha BSC	SV Norden-Nordwest
1927	Hertha BSC	BSC Kickers 1900
1928	Hertha BSC	Tennis Borussia Berlin
1929	Hertha BSC	Tennis Borussia Berlin
1930	**Hertha BSC**	Tennis Borussia Berlin
1931	**Hertha BSC**	Tennis Borussia Berlin
1932	Tennis Borussia Berlin	SC Minerva 93
1933	Hertha BSC	BFC Viktoria 1889

- ^{1} Club from the rival Märkischer Fußball-Bund league.

=== March Football Championship ===
The championship of the Märkischer Fußball-Bund was held from 1903 to 1911, resulting in the following champions:

**Season**	**Winner**
1903	Vorwärts Berlin
1904	Weissensee 1900
1905	BFC Alemannia 90 Wacker
1906	SV Norden-Nordwest
1907	BFC Alemannia 90 Wacker
1908	SV Norden-Nordwest
1909	SC Tasmania 1900 Berlin
1910	SC Tasmania 1900 Berlin
1911	SC Tasmania 1900 Berlin

== Finals ==
The Brandenburg championship was not always decided by a final. In some seasons, a final was necessary because two clubs finished on equal points at the top of the table. In two seasons, a final was played against the winner of a rival competition. In most cases where a final was played, it was when the league was split into two divisions and the division winners played for the Brandenburg championship.

Year	Champion	Runner-Up	Result	Date	Venue	Attendance
1898	Britannia Berlin	BFC Preussen	1–0 / 3–1			
1898	BFC Preussen	BFC Viktoria 1889	0–0 / 3–2 aet			
1902	BFC Viktoria 1889	Britannia Berlin	5–2 / 1–2 / 5–1			
1907	BFC Viktoria 1889	BFC Alemannia 90	5–0			
1908	BFC Viktoria 1889	SV Norden-Nordwest	4–3			
1912	BFC Preussen	BFC Viktoria 1889	2–1 / 2–1			
1921	Vorwärts Berlin	BFC Preussen	2–0 / 1–2			
1922	SV Norden-Nordwest	SCC Berlin	4–2 / 1–0	10 & 14 May 1922		
1923	Union Oberschöneweide	Vorwärts Berlin	3–1 / 1–1	1 & 22 April 1923		
1924	BFC Alemannia 90	SV Norden-Nordwest	3–1 / 2–2	27 April & 4 May 1924		
1925	Hertha BSC	BFC Alemannia 90	3–1 / 3–2	8 & 29 March 1925		
1926	Hertha BSC	SV Norden-Nordwest	7–0 / 2–1	2 & 8 May 1926		
1927	Hertha BSC	BSC Kickers 1900	4–1 / 6–2	10 & 24 April 1927		
1928	Hertha BSC	Tennis Borussia Berlin	3–1 / 1–2 / 4–0	4 March & 18 March & 15 April 1928		
1929	Hertha BSC	Tennis Borussia Berlin	1–0 / 0–1 / 5–2	7 April & 14 April & 26 May 1929		
1930	Hertha BSC	Tennis Borussia Berlin	3–1 / 2–0	27 April & 4 May 1930		
