= List of clubs in the German football championship =

This is a list of all clubs that have taken part in the German football championship from 1903 to 1963, in the era when the national championship was decided by a finals round with a national title game at the end.

The German football championship was first held in 1903 and won by VfB Leipzig. In 1904, the championship was not completed due to a protest by Karlsruher FV about a technicality, with all games but the final played. The competition was held again in 1905 and, from then on, annually.

The championship was interrupted by the World War I, and not held from 1915 to 1920, when football returned to more organised fashion after the disruptions caused by the war.

In 1922, the final was inconclusive and Hamburger SV was declared champions but declined the honor. After this, a championship was held every season until 1944. With the expansion of Nazi Germany, clubs from occupied territories or annexed countries took part in the competition, including teams from Austria, France, Luxembourg, Poland, and Czechoslovakia.

Occupation zone borders in Germany

The German championship resumed in 1948, three years after the end of the World War II. Germany, now greatly reduced in size, originally was divided into four occupation zones; from 1949 into three political entities, the German Democratic Republic, known in English as East Germany, the Saar Protectorate, now the German Federal State of the Saarland, and the Federal Republic of Germany, widely called in English, West Germany.

The clubs from the Saar protectorate remained within the German football league system for the most part and continued to take part in the national championship. East German clubs did not. SC Planitz, the team from Zwickau, in Saxony qualified for the 1948 championships at Nuremberg, but was refused a travel permit by the Soviet authorities. After 1948, no clubs from the East entered the championship again.

The German championship continued to operate in this form until 1963, when the system was superseded by the Bundesliga as a means of determining the national champion.

With thirty-one appearances, Hamburger SV holds the record, while 1. FC Nürnberg won the most titles, eight, followed by FC Schalke 04 with seven. The now defunct VfB Königsberg has the most appearances in the national finals without ever reaching the championship game, sixteen.

== List ==
=== A ===
Club	Qualified	Champions	Runners-up	Seasons
Alemannia Aachen	1	0	0	1938
Hindenburg Allenstein	5	0	0	1932, 1933, 1936, 1937, 1939
BV Altenessen	1	0	0	1926
TuS Helene Altenessen	1	0	0	1941
FC Altona 93	4	0	0	1903, 1909, 1914, 1925

=== B ===
Club	Qualified	Champions	Runners-up	Seasons
VfL Benrath	5	0	0	1930, 1932, 1933, 1934, 1935
Alemannia Berlin	2	0	0	1924, 1925
Berliner BC	1	0	0	1914
SpVgg Blau-Weiß 1890 Berlin	2	0	0	1939, 1942
**Hertha BSC**	15	2	4	1906, 1925, 1926, 1927, 1928, 1929, **1930**, **1931**, 1933, 1935, 1937, 1944, 1957, 1961, 1963
Kickers 1900 Berlin	1	0	0	1927
Minerva 93 Berlin	1	0	0	1932
Norden-Nordwest Berlin	3	0	0	1906, 1922, 1926
BFC Preussen	2	0	0	1910, 1912
Berliner SV 92	7	0	1	1903, 1904, 1936, 1938, 1943, 1949, 1954
Tasmania 1900 Berlin	6	0	0	1909, 1910, 1911, 1959, 1960, 1962
Tennis Borussia Berlin	10	0	0	1928, 1929, 1930, 1931, 1932, 1941, 1950, 1951, 1952, 1958
Union Oberschöneweide	4	0	1	1920, 1923, 1940, 1948
**Union 92 Berlin**	2	1	0	**1905**, 1906
Union 06 Berlin	2	0	0	1950, 1953
**Viktoria 89 Berlin**	10	2	2	1907, **1908**, 1909, **1911**, 1912, 1913, 1933, 1934, 1955, 1956
Vorwärts Berlin	1	0	1	1921
Beuthen 09	6	0	0	1930, 1931, 1932, 1933, 1934, 1937
Arminia Bielefeld	2	0	0	1922, 1923
VfB Bielefeld	1	0	0	1931
Union Böckingen	1	0	0	1934
Eintracht Braunschweig	5	0	0	1905, 1908, 1943, 1944, 1958
Werder Bremen	9	0	0	1934, 1936, 1937, 1942, 1959, 1960, 1961, 1962, 1963
TuS Bremerhaven 93	1	0	0	1955
FV Breslau 06	1	0	0	1927
SC Breslau 08	5	0	0	1925, 1926, 1928, 1929, 1932
Schlesien Breslau	3	0	0	1905, 1906, 1907
Sportfreunde Breslau	7	0	0	1920, 1921, 1923, 1924, 1927, 1928, 1930
SV Breslau 02	1	0	0	1942
VfR Breslau	2	0	0	1908, 1910
LSV Brieg	1	0	0	1943
MSV Brünn	2	0	0	1943, 1944
NSTG Brüx	1	0	0	1944

=== C ===
Club	Qualified	Champions	Runners-up	Seasons
WSC Celle	1	0	0	1944
Chemnitzer BC	2	0	0	1927, 1933
PSV Chemnitz	3	0	0	1932, 1935, 1936
Alemannia Cottbus	2	0	0	1905, 1909

=== D ===
Club	Qualified	Champions	Runners-up	Seasons
BuEV Danzig	1	0	0	1912
LSV Danzig	1	0	0	1944
Preußen Danzig	2	0	0	1934, 1941
Preußen Dellbrück	1	0	0	1950
SV Dessau 05	6	0	0	1937, 1938, 1939, 1942, 1943, 1944
**Borussia Dortmund**	7	3	2	1949, 1950, 1953, **1956**, **1957**, 1961, **1963**
Guts Muths Dresden	1	0	0	1923
**Dresdner SC**	13	2	1	1905, 1926, 1928, 1929, 1930, 1931, 1933, 1934, 1939, 1940, 1941, **1943**, **1944**
FV Stadt Düdelingen	1	0	0	1942
KSG Duisburg	1	0	0	1944
MSV Duisburg	2	0	0	1929, 1931
Duisburger SV	13	0	1	1904, 1905, 1908, 1910, 1911, 1913, 1914, 1921, 1924, 1925, 1926, 1927, 1957
**Fortuna Düsseldorf**	9	1	1	1927, 1928, 1931, **1933**, 1936, 1937, 1938, 1939, 1940
Düsseldorfer FC 99	1	0	0	1907
TuRU Düsseldorf	1	0	0	1925

=== E ===
Club	Qualified	Champions	Runners-up	Seasons
Eimsbütteler TV	5	0	0	1934, 1935, 1936, 1940, 1942
SC Erfurt	1	0	0	1909
**Rot-Weiß Essen**	3	1	0	1950, 1952, **1955**
Schwarz-Weiß Essen	1	0	0	1925

=== F ===
Club	Qualified	Champions	Runners-up	Seasons
Askania Forst	3	0	0	1911, 1913, 1914
FC Viktoria Forst	3	0	0	1922, 1925, 1926
**Eintracht Frankfurt**	11	1	1	1928, 1930, 1931, 1932, 1933, 1938, 1953, 1954, **1959**, 1961, 1962
FSV Frankfurt	3	0	1	1925, 1926, 1933
**Freiburger FC**	2	1	0	**1907**, 1908
Borussia Fulda	5	0	0	1932, 1934, 1941, 1942, 1944
**SpVgg Fürth**	11	3	1	**1914**, 1920, 1923, **1926**, 1927, **1929**, 1930, 1931, 1935, 1950, 1951

=== G ===
Club	Qualified	Champions	Runners-up	Seasons
Vorwärts-Rasensport Gleiwitz	7	0	0	1933, 1935, 1936, 1938, 1939, 1940, 1941
SV Göppingen	1	0	0	1944
NSTG Graslitz	1	0	0	1940
HSV Groß-Born	1	0	0	1944

=== H ===
Club	Qualified	Champions	Runners-up	Seasons
Wacker Halle	3	0	0	1920, 1928, 1934
SV Hamborn 07	1	0	0	1942
Westende Hamborn	1	0	0	1943
Germania Hamburg	1	0	0	1904
LSV Hamburg	1	0	1	1944
**Hamburger SV**	31	3	4	1921, 1922, **1923**, 1924, 1925, 1926, 1927, **1928**, 1929, 1931, 1932, 1933, 1937, 1938, 1939, 1941, 1948, 1949, 1950, 1951, 1952, 1953, 1955, 1956, 1957, 1958, 1959, **1960**, 1961, 1962, 1963
FC St. Pauli Hamburg	4	0	0	1948, 1949, 1950, 1951
SC Victoria Hamburg	4	0	0	1905, 1906, 1907, 1943
FC Hanau 93	3	0	0	1935, 1936, 1938
Arminia Hannover	3	0	0	1920, 1930, 1933
ASC Hannover	1	0	0	1904
**Hannover 96**	6	2	0	1905, 1935, **1938**, 1941, **1954**, 1956
BC Hartha	2	0	0	1937, 1938
Westfalia Herne	2	0	0	1959, 1960
Preussen Hindenburg	1	0	0	1929
STG Hirschberg	1	0	0	1944
STV Horst-Emscher	1	0	0	1950

=== I ===
Club	Qualified	Champions	Runners-up	Seasons
Yorck Boyen Insterburg	2	0	0	1935, 1938

=== J ===
Club	Qualified	Champions	Runners-up	Seasons
1. SV Jena	5	0	0	1925, 1935, 1936, 1940, 1941

=== K ===
Club	Qualified	Champions	Runners-up	Seasons
**1. FC Kaiserslautern**	12	2	3	1942, 1948, 1949, 1950, **1951**, **1953**, 1954, 1955, 1956, 1957, 1958, 1963
**Karlsruher FV**	6	1	2	1903, 1904, 1905, **1910**, 1911, 1912
**Phönix Karlsruhe**	2	1	0	**1909**, 1910
Karlsruher SC	3	0	1	1956, 1958, 1960
FV Kassel	1	0	0	1904
CSC Kassel	2	0	0	1939, 1940
SV 06 Kassel	2	0	0	1937, 1943
**Holstein Kiel**	15	1	2	1910, 1911, **1912**, 1913, 1926, 1927, 1928, 1929, 1930, 1931, 1932, 1943, 1944, 1953, 1957
Kölner BC	1	0	0	1912
CfR Köln	1	0	0	1936
**1. FC Köln**	8	1	2	1953, 1954, 1958, 1959, 1960, 1961, **1962**, 1963
KSG Köln-Sülz/VfL 99	1	0	0	1944
SC 99 Köln	1	0	0	1906
VfL Köln 99	4	0	0	1941, 1942
VfR Köln	3	0	0	1926, 1935, 1937
Victoria Köln	1	0	0	1943
Prussia Samland Königsberg	5	0	0	1910, 1913, 1914, 1931, 1933
VfB Königsberg	16	0	0	1908, 1909, 1923, 1924, 1925, 1926, 1927, 1928, 1929, 1930, 1931, 1940, 1941, 1942, 1943, 1944
Germania Königshütte	3	0	0	1942, 1943, 1944
LSV Krakau	2	0	0	1942, 1944
Preußen Krefeld	1	0	0	1928

=== L ===
Club	Qualified	Champions	Runners-up	Seasons
Fortuna Leipzig	1	0	0	1926
SpVgg Leipzig	5	0	0	1912, 1914, 1922, 1924, 1931
**VfB Leipzig**	12	3	3	**1903**, 1904, **1906**, 1907, 1910, 1911, **1913**, 1914, 1920, 1925, 1927, 1930
Wacker Leipzig	2	0	0	1908, 1929
ATV Liegnitz	1	0	0	1912
VfB Liegnitz	1	0	0	1931
Polizei Litzmannstadt	1	0	0	1942
Phönix Ludwigshafen	1	0	0	1935

=== M ===
Club	Qualified	Champions	Runners-up	Seasons
SV Victoria 96 Magdeburg	3	0	0	1903, 1904, 1905
**VfR Mannheim**	8	1	0	1925, 1935, 1938, 1939, 1943, 1944, **1949**, 1950
Waldhof Mannheim	5	0	0	1934, 1936, 1937, 1940, 1942
HUS Marienwerder	1	0	0	1942
Borussia Mönchengladbach	1	0	0	1920
FC Mönchengladbach	1	0	0	1909
FC Mülhausen 93	3	0	0	1941, 1943, 1944
Mülheimer SV	2	0	0	1934, 1940
**FC Bayern Munich**	5	1	0	1926, 1928, 1929, **1932**, 1944
TSV 1860 Munich	7	0	1	1927, 1931, 1933, 1941, 1943, 1948, 1963
FC Wacker München	2	0	0	1922, 1928
Preußen Münster	1	0	1	1950

=== N ===
Club	Qualified	Champions	Runners-up	Seasons
VfL Neckarau	1	0	0	1941
TuS Neuendorf	5	0	0	1943, 1944, 1948, 1950, 1956
SV Neufahrwasser 1919	1	0	0	1943
Borussia Neunkirchen	5	0	0	1959, 1960, 1961, 1962, 1963
**1. FC Nürnberg**	24	8	4	**1920**, **1921**, 1922, **1924**, **1925**, **1927**, 1929, 1930, 1932, 1934, **1936**, 1937, 1938, 1940, 1943, 1944, **1948**, 1951, 1952, 1957, 1958, **1961**, 1962, 1963

=== O ===
Club	Qualified	Champions	Runners-up	Seasons
Kickers Offenbach	12	0	2	1934, 1940, 1941, 1942, 1943, 1944, 1949, 1950, 1955, 1957, 1959, 1960
LSV Olmütz	1	0	0	1942
VfL Osnabrück	4	0	0	1939, 1940, 1950, 1952

=== P ===
Club	Qualified	Champions	Runners-up	Seasons
DFC Prag	1	0	1	1903
NSTG Prag	1	0	0	1941
1. FC Pforzheim	1	0	1	1906
FK Pirmasens	4	0	0	1958, 1959, 1960, 1962
SC Planitz	2	0	0	1942, 1948
SuBC Plauen	1	0	0	1932
DWM Posen	2	0	0	1943, 1944
LSV Pütnitz	2	0	0	1942, 1943

=== R ===
Club	Qualified	Champions	Runners-up	Seasons
LSV Rerik	1	0	0	1944
SSV Reutlingen	2	0	0	1950, 1955
TSG Rostock	1	0	0	1943

=== S ===
Club	Qualified	Champions	Runners-up	Seasons
KSG Saarbrücken	1	0	0	1944
1. FC Saarbrücken	4	0	2	1943, 1952, 1957, 1961
**FC Schalke 04**	22	7	3	1927, 1928, 1929, 1930, 1932, 1933, **1934**, **1935**, 1936, **1937**, 1938, **1939**, **1940**, 1941, **1942**, 1943, 1944, 1951, 1952, 1956, **1958**, 1962
FC Schweinfurt 05	2	0	0	1939, 1942
SV Sodingen	1	0	0	1955
LSV Stettin	1	0	0	1941
Preußen Stettin	1	0	0	1928
SC Stettin	4	0	0	1921, 1926, 1935, 1938
Titania Stettin	6	0	0	1920, 1922, 1925, 1927, 1929, 1930
VfL Stettin	1	0	0	1940
Viktoria Stolp	5	0	0	1932, 1934, 1936, 1937, 1939
SG SS Straßburg	1	0	0	1942
Stuttgarter Kickers	7	0	1	1908, 1913, 1936, 1939, 1940, 1941, 1942
**VfB Stuttgart**	9	2	2	1935, 1937, 1938, 1943, **1950**, **1952**, 1953, 1954, 1956
SpVgg Sülz 07	3	0	0	1928, 1930, 1939

=== T ===
Club	Qualified	Champions	Runners-up	Seasons
Lituania Tilsit	1	0	0	1911

=== W ===
Club	Qualified	Champions	Runners-up	Seasons
Warnsdorfer FK	1	0	0	1939
SG Warschau	1	0	0	1943
Admira Wien	1	0	1	1939
First Vienna	3	0	1	1942, 1943, 1944
**Rapid Wien**	2	1	0	1940, **1941**
SV Wilhelmshaven	2	0	0	1943, 1944
Wormatia Worms	5	0	0	1936, 1937, 1939, 1949, 1955

- **Bold** denotes champions and championship-winning seasons.
- Italics denotes club was from territories outside of what is now the Federal Republic of Germany.

== Sources ==
- kicker Allmanach 1990, by kicker, page 160 & 178 - German championship
- Pre-1933 Football leagues in Germany Das Deutsche Fussball Archiv (in German)
- Germany - Championships 1902-1945 at Rec.Sport.Soccer Statistics Foundation
- Hirschi's Fussballseiten - History of German football (in German), Results and tables up until 1933
