= List of VfB Stuttgart seasons =

This is a list of the seasons played by VfB Stuttgart from 1909 when the club replaced the rugby club. In 1909 they joined the South German Football Association playing the second tier B-klasse. Because there is very little information about these leagues this list starts from 1912 when Stuttgart eventually advanced to the senior Südkreis-Liga. The club's achievements in all major national and international competitions as well as the top scorers are listed. Top scorers in bold and coloured background were also top scorers of the division. The list is separated into three parts, coinciding with the three major episodes of German football:

- Before 1945 the German league structure was changing rapidly. The end of World War II marks the end of this episode.
- From 1945–63 a German league structure without a nationwide league was maintained without greater changes.
- Since 1963 a nationwide league, the Bundesliga, exists.

VfB Stuttgart have won the German football championship five times; two before and three after the establishment of the Bundesliga. The club also won the DFB-Pokal three times and the DFL-Supercup once.

The club have been relegated three times from the Bundesliga, in 1975, 2016 and 2019. In 1977, 2017 and 2020, the club was promoted back to first division football.

== Key ==
Key to league record:

- Pld – Matches played
- W – Matches won
- D – Matches drawn
- L – Matches lost
- GF – Goals for
- GA – Goals against
- Pts – Points
- Pos – Final position

Key to colours and symbols:
| Symbol | Meaning |
|---|---|
| **W** | Winners |
| RU | Runners-up |
| ↑ | Promoted |
| ↓ | Relegated |
| EC | European Cup / Champions League |
| EC | UEFA Cup / Europa League |
| ♦ | Top league scorer in Vfb Stuttgart's division |

Key to rounds:

- Prel. – Preliminary round
- QR1 – First qualifying round
- QR2 – Second qualifying round, etc.
- Inter – Intermediate round (between qualifying rounds and rounds proper)
- GS – Group stage
- 1R – First round
- 2R – Second round, etc.
- R64 – 1/32 Final
- R32 – 1/16 Final
- R16 – 1/8 Final
- QF – Quarter-finals
- SF – Semi-finals
- F – Final
- W – Winners
- DNE – Did not enter
- BL – Bundesliga
- 2BL – 2. Bundesliga
- SGFC – South German Football Championship

== Seasons until 1933 ==
Results of league competitions by season.

Results of league and cup competitions by season
| Season | Division | Pld | W | D | L | GF | GA | Pts | Pos | Name(s) | Goals |
| Season | League | | | | | | | | | Top goalscorer(s) | |
|---|---|---|---|---|---|---|---|---|---|---|---|
| 1912–13 | SGFC Südkreis | 14 | 5 | 2 | 7 | 23 | 32 | 12 | 6th | N/A | - |
| 1913–14 | SGFC Südkreis | 14 | 3 | 2 | 9 | 18 | 33 | 8 | 7th | N/A | - |
| 1914–15 | World War I | | | | | | | | | | |
| 1915–16 | World War I | | | | | | | | | | |
| 1916–17 | World War I | | | | | | | | | | |
| 1917–18 | World War I | | | | | | | | | | |
| 1918–19 | World War I | | | | | | | | | | |
| 1919–20 | World War I | | | | | | | | | | |
| 1921–22 | SGFC Kreis Württemberg II | 14 | 9 | 4 | 1 | 29 | 13 | 22 | 2nd | N/A | - |
| 1922–23 | SGFC Kreis Württemberg | 14 | 5 | 4 | 5 | 19 | 17 | 14 | 6th ↓ | N/A | - |
| 1923–24 | N/A | - | - | - | - | - | - | - | ↑ | N/A | - |
| 1924–25 | SGFC Bezirk Württemberg/Baden | 14 | 5 | 3 | 6 | 19 | 25 | 13 | 5th | N/A | - |
| 1925–26 | SGFC Bezirk Württemberg/Baden | 14 | 7 | 3 | 4 | 34 | 19 | 17 | 2nd | N/A | - |
| 1926–27 | SGFC Bezirk Württemberg/Baden | 18 | 14 | 3 | 1 | 49 | 20 | 31 | 1st | N/A | - |
| 1927–28 | SGFC Bezirk Württemberg | 16 | 10 | 1 | 5 | 52 | 24 | 21 | 3rd | N/A | - |
| 1928–29 | SGFC Bezirk Württemberg | 14 | 7 | 4 | 3 | 31 | 19 | 18 | 3rd | N/A | - |
| 1929–30 | SGFC Bezirk Württemberg | 14 | 10 | 0 | 4 | 36 | 21 | 20 | 1st | N/A | - |
| 1930–31 | SGFC Bezirk Württemberg | 14 | 8 | 3 | 3 | 35 | 16 | 19 | 2nd | N/A | - |
| 1931–32 | SGFC Bezirk Württemberg | 18 | 8 | 6 | 4 | 42 | 28 | 22 | 2nd | N/A | - |
| 1932–33 | SGFC Bezirk Württemberg | 18 | 10 | 6 | 2 | 46 | 27 | 26 | 3rd | N/A | - |

== Gauliga (1933–1945) ==
Results of league and cup competitions by season
| Season | Division | Pld | W | D | L | GF | GA | Pts | Pos | DFB-Pokal | Name(s) | Goals |
| Season | League | | | | | | | | | DFB-Pokal | Top goalscorer(s) | |
|---|---|---|---|---|---|---|---|---|---|---|---|---|
| 1933–34 | Gauliga Württemberg | 16 | 6 | 5 | 5 | 45 | 35 | 17 | 3rd | Not played | N/A | - |
| 1934–35 | Gauliga Württemberg | 18 | 11 | 3 | 4 | 53 | 31 | 25 | 1st | R64 | N/A | - |
| 1935–36 | Gauliga Württemberg | 18 | 8 | 5 | 5 | 48 | 33 | 21 | 3rd | R16 | N/A | - |
| 1936–37 | Gauliga Württemberg | 18 | 12 | 3 | 3 | 50 | 27 | 27 | 1st | QF | N/A | - |
| 1937–38 | Gauliga Württemberg | 18 | 14 | 3 | 1 | 58 | 14 | 31 | 1st | QR1 | N/A | - |
| 1938–39 | Gauliga Württemberg | 18 | 10 | 4 | 4 | 38 | 30 | 24 | 2nd | DNE | N/A | - |
| 1939–40 | Gauliga Württemberg | 10 | 9 | 1 | 0 | 43 | 12 | 19 | 1st | R64 | N/A | - |
| 1940–41 | Gauliga Württemberg | 22 | 16 | 5 | 1 | 88 | 28 | 37 | 2nd | DNE | N/A | - |
| 1941–42 | Gauliga Württemberg | 18 | 14 | 1 | 3 | 58 | 24 | 29 | 2nd | R16 | N/A | - |
| 1942–43 | Gauliga Württemberg | 18 | 15 | 0 | 3 | 67 | 25 | 30 | 1st | DNE | N/A | - |
| 1943–44 | Gauliga Württemberg | 18 | 8 | 3 | 7 | 39 | 35 | 19 | 4th | Not played | N/A | - |
| 1944–45 | World War II | | | | | | | | | | | |

== 1945–1963 ==
Results of league and cup competitions by season
| Season | Division | Pld | W | D | L | GF | GA | Pts | Pos | DFB-Pokal | Cup | Result | Player(s) | Goals |
| Season | League | | | | | | | | | DFB-Pokal | UEFA – FIFA | | Top goalscorer(s) | |
|---|---|---|---|---|---|---|---|---|---|---|---|---|---|---|
| 1945–46 | Oberliga Süd | 30 | 21 | 4 | 5 | 91 | 34 | 46 | 1st | Not played | | | - | - |
| 1946–47 | Oberliga Süd | 38 | 17 | 9 | 12 | 64 | 58 | 43 | 6th | Not played | | | - | - |
| 1947–48 | Oberliga Süd | 38 | 21 | 3 | 14 | 96 | 60 | 45 | 5th | Not played | | | - | - |
| 1948–49 | Oberliga Süd | 30 | 13 | 5 | 12 | 56 | 51 | 31 | 6th | Not played | | | - | - |
| 1949–50 | Oberliga Süd | 30 | 15 | 8 | 7 | 50 | 39 | 38 | **W** | Not played | | | - | - |
| 1950–51 | Oberliga Süd | 34 | 19 | 5 | 10 | 82 | 55 | 43 | 4th | Not played | | | - | - |
| 1951–52 | Oberliga Süd | 30 | 17 | 10 | 3 | 60 | 24 | 44 | **W** | Not played | | | - | - |
| 1952–53 | Oberliga Süd | 30 | 15 | 8 | 7 | 69 | 33 | 38 | RU | R32 | | | - | - |
| 1953–54 | Oberliga Süd | 30 | 18 | 7 | 5 | 64 | 39 | 43 | 1st | **W** | | | - | - |
| 1954–55 | Oberliga Süd | 30 | 11 | 4 | 15 | 58 | 60 | 26 | 13th | QF | | | - | - |
| 1955–56 | Oberliga Süd | 30 | 14 | 10 | 6 | 52 | 29 | 38 | 2nd | DNE | | | - | - |
| 1956–57 | Oberliga Süd | 30 | 17 | 5 | 8 | 69 | 44 | 39 | 4th | DNE | | | - | - |
| 1957–58 | Oberliga Süd | 30 | 11 | 6 | 13 | 55 | 46 | 28 | 9th | **W** | | | - | - |
| 1958–59 | Oberliga Süd | 30 | 11 | 8 | 11 | 61 | 49 | 30 | 5th | DNE | | | - | - |
| 1959–60 | Oberliga Süd | 30 | 13 | 7 | 10 | 66 | 57 | 33 | 7th | DNE | | | - | - |
| 1960–61 | Oberliga Süd | 30 | 14 | 2 | 14 | 57 | 53 | 30 | 7th | QF | | | - | - |
| 1961–62 | Oberliga Süd | 30 | 13 | 8 | 9 | 66 | 53 | 34 | 5th | DNE | | | - | - |
| 1962–63 | Oberliga Süd | 30 | 12 | 8 | 10 | 49 | 40 | 32 | 6th | DNE | | | - | - |

== Since 1963 (foundation of Bundesliga) ==
Results of league and cup competitions by season
| Season | Division | Pld | W | D | L | GF | GA | Pts | Pos | DFB-Pokal | DFL-Supercup | Cup | Result | Player(s) | Goals |
| Season | League | | | | | | | | | DFB-Pokal | DFL-Supercup | UEFA – FIFA | | Top goalscorer(s) | |
|---|---|---|---|---|---|---|---|---|---|---|---|---|---|---|---|
| 1963–64 | Bundesliga | 30 | 13 | 7 | 10 | 48 | 40 | 33 | 5th | R16 | | | | Dieter Höller | 17 |
| 1964–65 | Bundesliga | 30 | 9 | 8 | 13 | 46 | 50 | 26 | 12th | QF | | | | Hartmut Weiß | 12 |
| 1965–66 | Bundesliga | 30 | 13 | 6 | 15 | 42 | 48 | 32 | 11th | R32 | | | | Hans-Otto Peters | 7 |
| 1966–67 | Bundesliga | 30 | 10 | 13 | 11 | 48 | 54 | 33 | 12th | R16 | | | | Hartmut Weiß | 10 |
| 1967–68 | Bundesliga | 30 | 14 | 7 | 13 | 65 | 54 | 35 | 8th | R16 | | | | Horst Köppel | 18 |
| 1968–69 | Bundesliga | 30 | 14 | 8 | 12 | 60 | 54 | 36 | 5th | R16 | | | | Manfred Weidmann | 11 |
| 1969–70 | Bundesliga | 30 | 14 | 7 | 13 | 59 | 62 | 35 | 7th | R32 | | | | Jan Olsson | 13 |
| 1970–71 | Bundesliga | 34 | 11 | 8 | 15 | 49 | 49 | 30 | 12th | R32 | | | | Hartmut Weiß | 16 |
| 1971–72 | Bundesliga | 34 | 13 | 9 | 12 | 52 | 56 | 35 | 8th | R16 | | | | Wolfgang Frank | 13 |
| 1972–73 | Bundesliga | 34 | 17 | 3 | 14 | 71 | 65 | 37 | 6th | R16 | | | | Karl-Heinz Handschuh | 13 |
| 1973–74 | Bundesliga | 34 | 12 | 7 | 15 | 58 | 57 | 31 | 9th | R32 | | UC | SF | Hermann Ohlicher | 26 |
| 1974–75 | Bundesliga | 34 | 8 | 8 | 118 | 50 | 79 | 24 | 16th ↓ | R128 | | | | Hermann Ohlicher | 17 |
| 1975–76 | 2. Bundesliga Süd | 38 | 16 | 4 | 18 | 67 | 60 | 36 | 11th | R64 | | | | Dieter Höller | 18 |
| 1976–77 | 2. Bundesliga Süd | 38 | 24 | 9 | 5 | 100 | 36 | 57 | 1st ↑ | R32 | | | | Ottmar Hitzfeld | 24 |
| 1977–78 | Bundesliga | 34 | 17 | 5 | 12 | 58 | 40 | 39 | 4th | R64 | | | | Hansi Müller | 15 |
| 1978–79 | Bundesliga | 34 | 20 | 8 | 6 | 73 | 34 | 48 | 2nd | R64 | | UC | R16 | Dieter Hoeneß | 26 |
| 1979–80 | Bundesliga | 34 | 17 | 7 | 10 | 75 | 53 | 41 | 3rd | QF | | UC | SF | Hermann Ohlicher | 19 |
| 1980–81 | Bundesliga | 34 | 19 | 8 | 7 | 70 | 44 | 46 | 3rd | QF | | UC | R16 | Hansi Müller Karl Allgöwer | 17 |
| 1981–82 | Bundesliga | 34 | 13 | 9 | 12 | 62 | 55 | 35 | 9th | R32 | | UC | R64 | Dieter Müller | 20 |
| 1982–83 | Bundesliga | 34 | 20 | 8 | 6 | 80 | 47 | 48 | 3rd | SF | | | | Karl Allgöwer | 24 |
| 1983–84 | Bundesliga | 34 | 19 | 10 | 5 | 79 | 33 | 48 | **W** | QF | | UC | R64 | Karl Allgöwer Peter Reichert | 15 |
| 1984–85 | Bundesliga | 34 | 14 | 5 | 15 | 79 | 59 | 33 | 10th | R16 | | EC | R32 | Karl Allgöwer | 22 |
| 1985–86 | Bundesliga | 34 | 17 | 7 | 10 | 69 | 45 | 41 | 5th | RU | | | | Karl Allgöwer | 29 |
| 1986–87 | Bundesliga | 34 | 13 | 6 | 15 | 55 | 49 | 32 | 12th | R64 | | CWC | R16 | Jürgen Klinsmann | 19 |
| 1987–88 | Bundesliga | 34 | 16 | 8 | 10 | 69 | 49 | 40 | 4th | R64 | | | | Jürgen Klinsmann | 19 |
| 1988–89 | Bundesliga | 34 | 16 | 7 | 11 | 58 | 49 | 39 | 5th | SF | | UC | RU | Karl Allgöwer Jürgen Klinsmann Fritz Walter | 19 |
| 1989–90 | Bundesliga | 34 | 15 | 6 | 13 | 53 | 47 | 36 | 6th | QF | | UC | R16 | Fritz Walter | 17 |
| 1990–91 | Bundesliga | 34 | 14 | 10 | 10 | 57 | 44 | 38 | 6th | QF | | | | Matthias Sammer Fritz Walter | 12 |
| 1991–92 | Bundesliga | 34 | 21 | 10 | 7 | 62 | 32 | 52 | **W** | QF | | UC | R32 | **Fritz Walter** ♦ | 31 |
| 1992–93 | Bundesliga | 34 | 12 | 12 | 10 | 56 | 50 | 36 | 7th | R64 | **W** | UCL | R32 | Fritz Walter | 15 |
| 1993–94 | Bundesliga | 34 | 13 | 11 | 10 | 51 | 43 | 37 | 7th | R64 | | | | Fritz Walter | 13 |
| 1994–95 | Bundesliga | 34 | 10 | 10 | 14 | 52 | 66 | 30 | 12th | R16 | | | | Fredi Bobic | 13 |
| 1995–96 | Bundesliga | 34 | 10 | 13 | 11 | 59 | 62 | 43 | 10th | R64 | | | | **Fredi Bobic** ♦ | 18 |
| 1996–97 | Bundesliga | 34 | 18 | 7 | 9 | 78 | 40 | 61 | 4th | **W** | | | | Fredi Bobic | 21 |
| 1997–98 | Bundesliga | 34 | 14 | 10 | 10 | 55 | 49 | 52 | 4th | SF | | CWC | RU | Fredi Bobic | 22 |
| 1998–99 | Bundesliga | 34 | 9 | 12 | 13 | 41 | 48 | 39 | 11th | QF | | UC | R32 | Jonathan Akpoborie | 14 |
| 1999–2000 | Bundesliga | 34 | 14 | 6 | 14 | 44 | 47 | 48 | 8th | QF | | | | Sean Dundee Ioan Ganea | 9 |
| 2000–01 | Bundesliga | 34 | 9 | 11 | 14 | 42 | 49 | 38 | 15th | SF | | UC | R16 | Ioan Ganea | 15 |
| 2001–02 | Bundesliga | 34 | 13 | 11 | 10 | 47 | 43 | 50 | 8th | R16 | | | | Ioan Ganea | 11 |
| 2002–03 | Bundesliga | 34 | 17 | 8 | 9 | 59 | 39 | 59 | 2nd | R32 | | UC | R16 | Kevin Kurányi | 22 |
| 2003–04 | Bundesliga | 34 | 18 | 10 | 6 | 52 | 24 | 64 | 4th | R16 | | UCL | R16 | Kevin Kurányi Imre Szabics | 15 |
| 2004–05 | Bundesliga | 34 | 17 | 7 | 10 | 54 | 40 | 58 | 5th | R16 | | UC | R32 | Cacau | 23 |
| 2005–06 | Bundesliga | 34 | 9 | 16 | 9 | 37 | 39 | 43 | 9th | R32 | | UC | R32 | Danijel Ljuboja | 13 |
| 2006–07 | Bundesliga | 34 | 21 | 7 | 6 | 61 | 37 | 70 | **W** | RU | | | | Cacau | 18 |
| 2007–08 | Bundesliga | 34 | 16 | 4 | 14 | 57 | 57 | 55 | 6th | QF | | UCL | GS | Mario Gómez | 28 |
| 2008–09 | Bundesliga | 34 | 19 | 7 | 8 | 63 | 43 | 64 | 3rd | R16 | | UC | R32 | Mario Gómez | 35 |
| 2009–10 | Bundesliga | 34 | 15 | 10 | 9 | 51 | 41 | 55 | 6th | R16 | | UCL | R16 | Cacau | 16 |
| 2010–11 | Bundesliga | 34 | 12 | 6 | 16 | 60 | 59 | 42 | 12th | R16 | | UEL | R32 | Martin Harnik | 17 |
| 2011–12 | Bundesliga | 34 | 15 | 8 | 11 | 63 | 46 | 53 | 6th | QF | | | | Martin Harnik | 17 |
| 2012–13 | Bundesliga | 34 | 12 | 7 | 15 | 37 | 55 | 43 | 12th | RU | | UEL | R16 | Vedad Ibišević | 24 |
| 2013–14 | Bundesliga | 34 | 8 | 8 | 18 | 49 | 62 | 32 | 15th | R32 | | UEL | PO | Vedad Ibišević | 15 |
| 2014–15 | Bundesliga | 34 | 9 | 9 | 16 | 42 | 60 | 36 | 14th | R64 | | | | Martin Harnik | 9 |
| 2015–16 | Bundesliga | 34 | 9 | 6 | 19 | 50 | 75 | 33 | 17th ↓ | QF | | | | Daniel Didavi | 14 |
| 2016–17 | 2. Bundesliga | 34 | 21 | 6 | 7 | 63 | 37 | 69 | 1st ↑ | R32 | | | | **Simon Terodde** ♦ | 25 |
| 2017–18 | Bundesliga | 34 | 15 | 6 | 13 | 36 | 36 | 51 | 7th | R16 | | | | Daniel Ginczek Mario Gómez | 8 |
| 2018–19 | Bundesliga | 34 | 7 | 7 | 20 | 32 | 70 | 28 | 16th ↓ | R64 | | | | Mario Gómez | 8 |
| 2019–20 | 2. Bundesliga | 34 | 17 | 7 | 10 | 62 | 41 | 58 | 2nd ↑ | R16 | | | | Nicolás González | 15 |
| 2020–21 | Bundesliga | 34 | 12 | 9 | 13 | 56 | 55 | 45 | 9th | R16 | | | | Saša Kalajdžić | 17 |
| 2021–22 | Bundesliga | 34 | 7 | 12 | 15 | 41 | 59 | 33 | 15th | R32 | | | | Saša Kalajdžić | 6 |
| 2022–23 | Bundesliga | 34 | 7 | 12 | 15 | 45 | 57 | 33 | 16th | SF | | | | Serhou Guirassy | 14 |
| 2023–24 | Bundesliga | 34 | 23 | 4 | 7 | 78 | 39 | 73 | 2nd | QF | | | | Serhou Guirassy | 30 |
| 2024–25 | Bundesliga | 34 | 14 | 8 | 12 | 64 | 53 | 50 | 9th | **W** | RU | UCL | LP | Ermedin Demirović | 15 |
| 2025–26 | Bundesliga | 34 | 18 | 8 | 8 | 71 | 49 | 62 | 4th | RU | RU | UEL | R16 | Deniz Undav | 19 |

== Literature ==
- Jankowski/Pistorius/Prüß (2005). Fußball im Norden. Geschichte, Chronik, Namen, Daten, Fakten, Zahlen. Bremen und Barsinghausen.
- Grüber, Walter (2011). Fußball Torjägerstatistik Deutschland. Torschützenlisten 1945-2011. Books on Demand GmbH. ISBN 978-3-8448-6248-5.
- Hirschi. "Hirschis Fussballseiten". www.fussball-historie.de.
- "The Rec.Sport.Soccer Statistics Foundation". RSSSF.
- Kassies, Bert. "UEFA European Cup Football". kassiesa.home.xs4all.nl.
- "UEFA". UEFA.
- "Worldfootball". www.worldfootball.net.
