= 1912 German football championship =

1912 German championship
Deutsche Fußballmeisterschaft
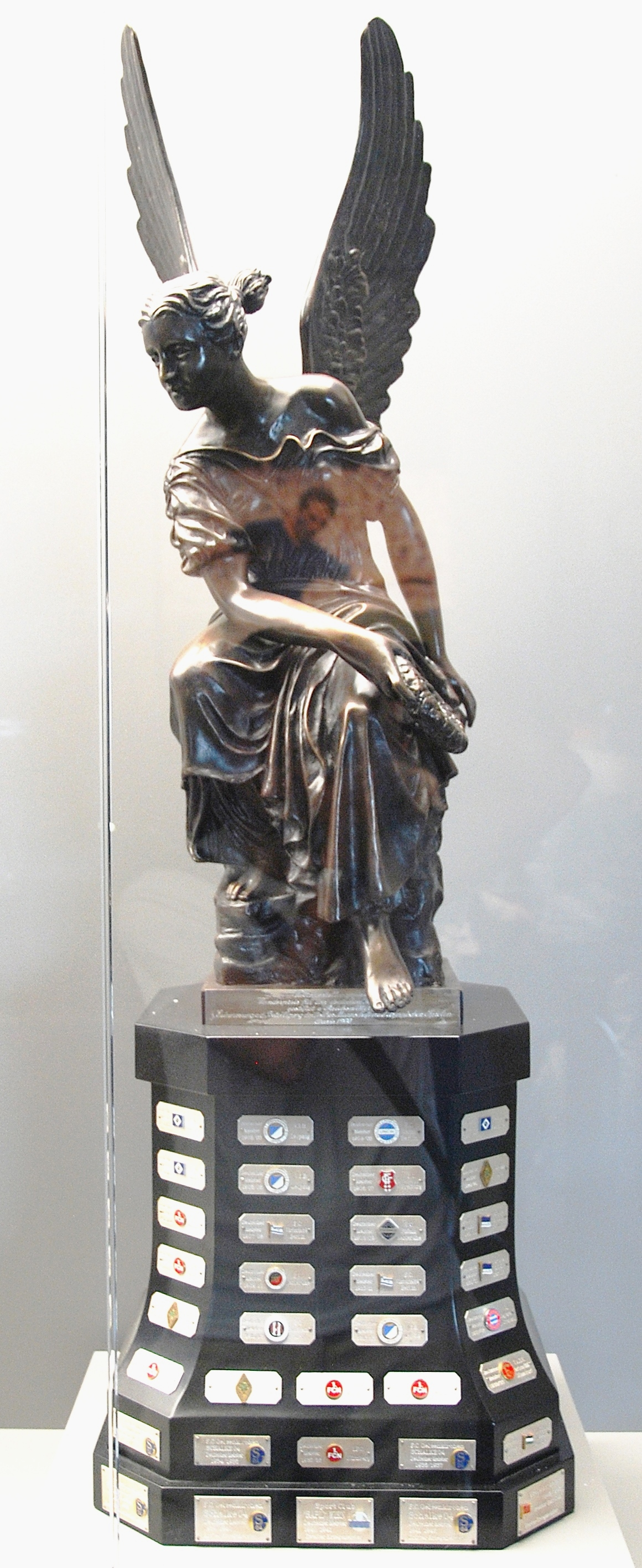
- Replica of the Viktoria trophy

Tournament details
- Country: Germany
- Dates: 5–26 May
- Teams: 8

Final positions
- Champions: Holstein Kiel; 1st German title
- Runner-up: Karlsruher FV

Tournament statistics
- Matches played: 7
- Goals scored: 32 (4.57 per match)
- Top goal scorer(s): Fritz Förderer (6 goals)

The 1912 German football championship, the 10th edition of the competition, was won by Holstein Kiel, defeating Karlsruher FV 1–0 in the final.

It was Kiel's sole German championship win, previously having made a losing appearance in the 1910 final. Holstein Kiel made one more final appearance, in 1930, where it lost to Hertha BSC. For Karlsruher FV it was the last final appearance for the club, having previously defeated Kiel in the 1910 final and lost the 1905 one to Union 92 Berlin.

Karlsruhe's Fritz Förderer was the top scorer of the 1912 championship with six goals.

Eight clubs qualified for the competition played in knock-out format, the champions of each of the seven regional football championships as well as the defending German champions.

== Qualified teams ==
The teams qualified through the regional championships:

Club	Qualified as
BuEV Danzig	Baltic champions
ATV Liegnitz	South Eastern German champions
Preußen Berlin	Brandenburg champion
SpVgg Leipzig	Central German champions
Holstein Kiel	Northern German champions
Kölner BC	Western German champions
Karlsruher FV	Southern German champions
Viktoria 89 Berlin	Holders

== Competition ==
=== Quarter-finals ===
The quarter-finals, played on 5 and 12 May 1912:

Team 1	Score	Team 2
Holstein Kiel	2–1	Preußen Berlin
Karlsruher FV	8–1	Kölner BC
SpVgg Leipzig	3–2	ATV Liegnitz
Viktoria 89 Berlin	7–0	BuEV Danzig

=== Semi-finals ===
The semi-finals, played on 19 May 1912:

Team 1	Score	Team 2
Holstein Kiel	2–1 aet	Viktoria 89 Berlin
Karlsruher FV	3–1	SpVgg Leipzig

=== Final ===
26 May 1912

Holstein Kiel	1 – 0	Karlsruher FV
Möller 52' (pen.)	Report

Hoheluft, Hamburg
Attendance: 9,000
Referee: Schröder

HOLSTEIN KIEL
(German Empire) Adolf Werner
(German Empire) Hans Reese
(German Empire) Heinrich Hofmeister
(German Empire) Willi Zincke
(German Empire) Georg Krogmann
(German Empire) Hans Dehning
(German Empire) Ernst Möller
(German Empire) Willi Fick
(German Empire) Hugo Fick
(German Empire) Helmut Bork
(German Empire) David Binder
Manager:

KARLSRUHER FV
(German Empire) Franz Burger
(German Empire) Max Breunig
(German Empire) Curt Hüber
(German Empire) Ernst Hollstein
(German Empire) Julius Hirsch
(German Empire) Wilhelm Gros
(German Empire) Hermann Bosch
(German Empire) Fritz Tscherter
(German Empire) Hermann Kächele
(German Empire) Gottfried Fuchs
(German Empire) Fritz Förderer
Manager:
