= 1910 German football championship =

1910 German championship
Deutsche Fußballmeisterschaft
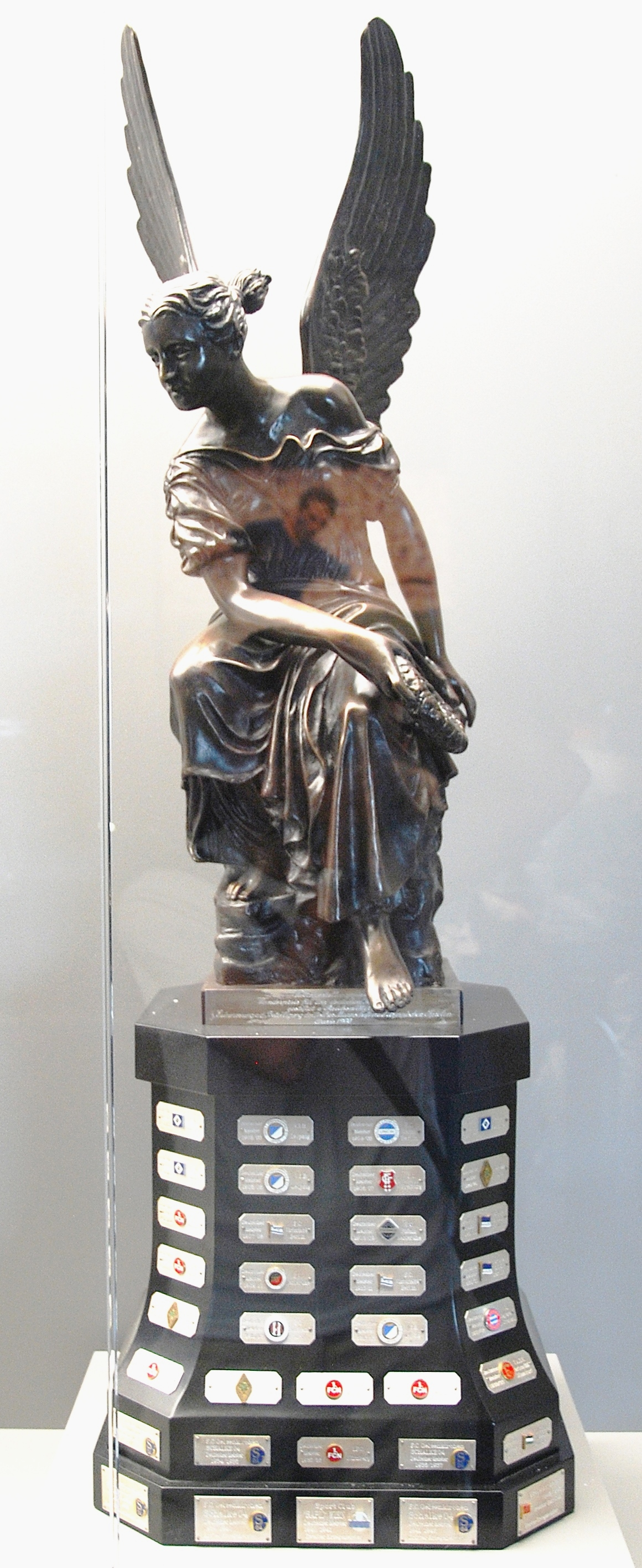
- Replica of the Viktoria trophy

Tournament details
- Country: Germany
- Dates: 10 April – 15 May
- Teams: 9

Final positions
- Champions: Karlsruher FV; 1st German title
- Runner-up: Holstein Kiel

Tournament statistics
- Matches played: 8
- Goals scored: 28 (3.5 per match)
- Top goal scorer(s): Willy Zincke (5 goals)

The 1910 German football championship, the eighth edition of the competition and organised by the German Football Association, was won by Karlsruher FV, defeating Holstein Kiel 1–0 in the final.

For Karlsruher FV it marked the club's sole German championship, having previously lost the 1905 final. The club would go on to play Holstein Kiel again in the 1912 final where the roles would be reversed and Kiel would win 1–0. Kiel, in turn, only made one other final appearance apart from 1910 and 1912, losing the 1930 final to Hertha BSC.

Kiel's Willi Zincke was the top scorer of the 1910 championship with five goals.

Nine teams participated, as holders Phönix Karlsruhe took part in addition to the winners of eight regional football championships. Berlin also sent two teams to the final, the champion of the Verband Berliner Ballspielvereine and the champions of the March football championship.

== Qualified teams ==
The teams qualified through the regional championships:

Club	Qualified as
Prussia Königsberg	Baltic champions
VfR Breslau	South Eastern German champions
Preußen Berlin	Berlin champions (Verband Berliner Ballspielvereine)
Tasmania Rixdorf	March football champions (Märkischer Fußball-Bund)
VfB Leipzig	Central German champions
Holstein Kiel	Northern German champions
Duisburger SpV	Western German champions
Karlsruher FV	Southern German champions
Phönix Karlsruhe	Holders

== Competition ==
=== Qualifying round ===
10 April 1910

Prussia Königsberg	1 – 5	Tasmania Rixdorf

Walter-Simon-Platz, Königsberg

=== Quarter-finals ===
17 April 1910

Holstein Kiel	4 – 1	Preußen Berlin

Stadion Hoheluft, Hamburg
17 April 1910

Duisburger SpV	0 – 1	Karlsruher FV

Kampfbahn Am alten Wasserturm, München-Gladbach
17 April 1910

VfB Leipzig	1 – 2	Phönix Karlsruhe

Wacker-Stadion, Leipzig
17 April 1910

Tasmania Rixdorf	2 – 1	VfR Breslau

Germania-Platz, Berlin-Tempelhof

=== Semi-finals ===
1 May 1910

Karlsruher FV	2 – 1	Phönix Karlsruhe

Stadion Telegrafenkaserne, Karlsruhe
1 May 1910

Holstein Kiel	6 – 0	Tasmania Rixdorf

Stadion Hoheluft, Hamburg

=== Final ===
15 May 1910

Karlsruher FV	1 – 0 (a.e.t.)	Holstein Kiel
Breunig 114' (pen.)

KFC 1899-Platz im Weidenpescher Park, Cologne
Attendance: 5,000
Referee: Grafe

KARLSRUHER FV
(German Empire) Adolf Dell
(German Empire) Max Breunig
(German Empire) Curt Hüber
(German Empire) Ernst Hollstein
(German Empire) Hermann Bosch
(German Empire) Max Schwarze
(German Empire) Hans Ruzek
(German Empire) Julius Hirsch
(German Empire) Fritz Tscherter
(German Empire) Gottfried Fuchs
(German Empire) Fritz Förderer
Manager:
(England) William Townley

HOLSTEIN KIEL
(German Empire) Willi Friese
(German Empire) Alfred Werner
(German Empire) Karl Rempka
(German Empire) Hans Reese
(German Empire) Hans Dehning
(German Empire) Paul Lenhardt
(German Empire) Georg Krogmann
(German Empire) Willi Fick
(German Empire) Helmut Bork
(German Empire) Willi Zincke
(German Empire) Carl Lafferenz
Manager:
