= 1937 German football championship =

1937 German championship
Deutsche Fußballmeisterschaft
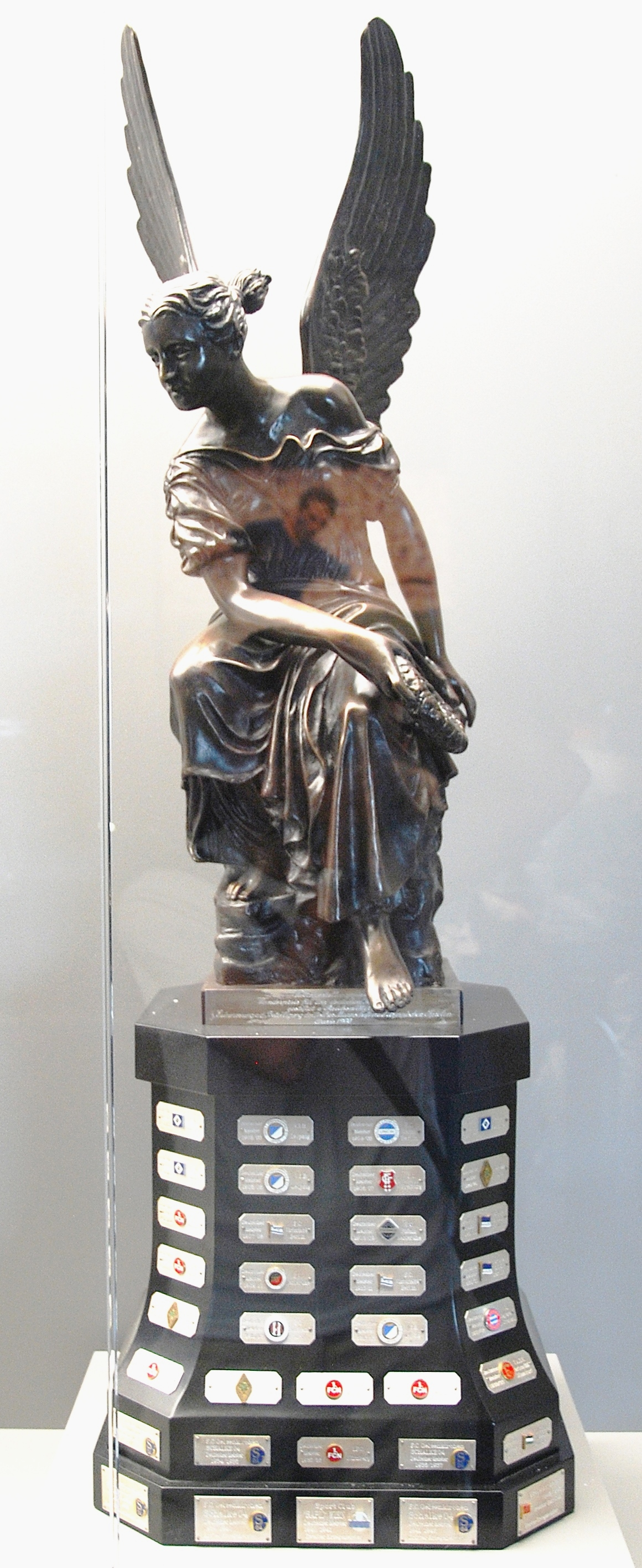
- Replica of the Viktoria trophy

Tournament details
- Country: Germany
- Dates: 4 April – 20 June
- Teams: 16

Final positions
- Champions: Schalke 04; 3rd German title
- Runners-up: 1. FC Nürnberg
- Third place: VfB Stuttgart
- Fourth place: Hamburger SV

Tournament statistics
- Matches played: 52
- Goals scored: 213 (4.1 per match)
- Top goal scorer(s): Ernst Kalwitzki; Karl Mayer (10 goals each)

The 1937 German football championship, the 30th edition of the competition, was won by Schalke 04, the club's third German championship, by defeating 1. FC Nürnberg 2–0 in the final. For Schalke it was the half-way point of the club's most successful era, having won the 1934, 1935 final before the 1937 title and going on to win the 1939, 1940 and 1942 ones as well, winning six national championships all up during this time. 1. FC Nürnberg, the defending champions who had eliminated Schalke in the semi-finals in the previous season, already had six titles to their name at the time and would go on to win three more between 1948 and 1968 for a total of nine. The two clubs, Germany's most successful teams in the pre-Bundesliga era, had previously met in the 1934 final which Schalke had won 2–1 but would never encounter each other again in a championship final after 1937.

Karl Mayer of SV Werder Bremen and Ernst Kalwitzki of FC Schalke 04 were the joint top scorers of the 1937 championship with ten goals each. Kalwitzki would finish as the competition's top scorer twice more, in 1939 and 1943.

It was the first-ever German championship final to be played in the Olympiastadion in Berlin, built for the 1936 Summer Olympics.

FC Schalke 04 completed the 1936–37 season unbeaten, finishing the Gauliga Westfalen with 17 wins and one draw. The club than went on to win seven out of eight games in the championship and draw one, against SV Werder Bremen, to complete the league season with a record of 24 wins and two draws. After the German championship win Schalke went on to win the 1937 Tschammerpokal, the German Cup as well, by defeating Fortuna Düsseldorf 2–1 in the final.

The sixteen 1936–37 Gauliga champions competed in a group stage of four groups of four teams each, with the group winners advancing to the semi-finals. The two semi-final winners then contested the 1937 championship final.

== Qualified teams ==
The teams qualified through the 1936–37 Gauliga season:

Club	Qualified from
SV Waldhof Mannheim	Gauliga Baden
1. FC Nürnberg	Gauliga Bayern
Hertha BSC	Gauliga Berlin-Brandenburg
SV 06 Kassel	Gauliga Hessen
SV Dessau 05	Gauliga Mitte
VfR Köln	Gauliga Mittelrhein
Fortuna Düsseldorf	Gauliga Niederrhein
SV Werder Bremen	Gauliga Niedersachsen
Hamburger SV	Gauliga Nordmark
Hindenburg Allenstein	Gauliga Ostpreußen
Viktoria Stolp	Gauliga Pommern
BC Hartha	Gauliga Sachsen
Beuthener SuSV 09	Gauliga Schlesien
Wormatia Worms	Gauliga Südwest
Schalke 04	Gauliga Westfalen
VfB Stuttgart	Gauliga Württemberg

== Competition ==
=== Group 1 ===
Group 1 was contested by the champions of the Gauligas Nordmark, Ostpreußen, Sachsen and Schlesien:

Pos	Team	Pld	W	D	L	GF	GA	GR	Pts	Qualification	HSV	BCH	HIA	BEU
1	Hamburger SV	6	6	0	0	27	4	6.750	12	Advance to semi-finals	—	3–0	6–1	6–0
2	BC Hartha	6	2	1	3	13	17	0.765	5		0–3	—	6–2	2–6
3	Hindenburg Allenstein	6	1	2	3	10	21	0.476	4		2–5	1–1	—	2–1
4	Beuthener SuSV	6	1	1	4	12	20	0.600	3		1–4	2–4	2–2	—

Source: RSSSF
Rules for classification: 1) Points; 2) Goal ratio.

=== Group 2 ===
Group 2 was contested by the champions of the Gauligas Brandenburg, Niedersachsen, Pommern and Westfalen:

Pos	Team	Pld	W	D	L	GF	GA	GR	Pts	Qualification	S04	SVW	BSC	STO
1	Schalke 04	6	5	1	0	31	5	6.200	11	Advance to semi-finals	—	5–1	2–1	12–0
2	Werder Bremen	6	4	1	1	20	10	2.000	9		2–2	—	5–2	5–0
3	Hertha BSC	6	2	0	4	12	13	0.923	4		1–2	1–3	—	3–1
4	Viktoria Stolp	6	0	0	6	1	36	0.028	0		0–8	0–4	0–4	—

Source: RSSSF
Rules for classification: 1) Points; 2) Goal ratio.

=== Group 3 ===
Group 3 was contested by the champions of the Gauligas Hessen, Mitte, Südwest and Württemberg:

Pos	Team	Pld	W	D	L	GF	GA	GR	Pts	Qualification	VFB	W08	SVD	SVK
1	VfB Stuttgart	6	4	1	1	12	3	4.000	9	Advance to semi-finals	—	0–0	2–0	3–0
2	Wormatia Worms	6	4	1	1	11	3	3.667	9		0–1	—	1–0	3–1
3	SV Dessau 05	6	2	0	4	6	12	0.500	4		2–1	0–4	—	4–2
4	SV 06 Kassel	6	1	0	5	7	18	0.389	2		1–5	1–3	2–0	—

Source: RSSSF
Rules for classification: 1) Points; 2) Goal ratio.

=== Group 4 ===
Group 4 was contested by the champions of the Gauligas Bayern, Baden, Mittelrhein and Niederrhein:

Pos	Team	Pld	W	D	L	GF	GA	GR	Pts	Qualification	FCN	F95	WMA	VRK
1	1. FC Nürnberg	6	5	1	0	18	4	4.500	11	Advance to semi-finals	—	0–0	7–1	3–1
2	Fortuna Düsseldorf	6	2	2	2	9	8	1.125	6		1–3	—	2–1	0–2
3	Waldhof Mannheim	6	2	1	3	6	14	0.429	5		1–4	1–1	—	1–0
4	VfR Köln	6	1	0	5	4	11	0.364	2		0–1	1–5	0–1	—

Source: RSSSF
Rules for classification: 1) Points; 2) Goal ratio.

=== Semi-finals ===
Team 1	Score	Team 2
6 June 1937
Schalke 04	4–2	VfB Stuttgart
1. FC Nürnberg	3–2	Hamburger SV

=== Third place play-off ===
Team 1	Score	Team 2
20 June 1937
VfB Stuttgart	1–0	Hamburger SV

=== Final ===
Team 1	Score	Team 2
20 June 1937
Schalke 04	2–0	1. FC Nürnberg
