= Walter Fritzsch =

German football manager (1920–1997)

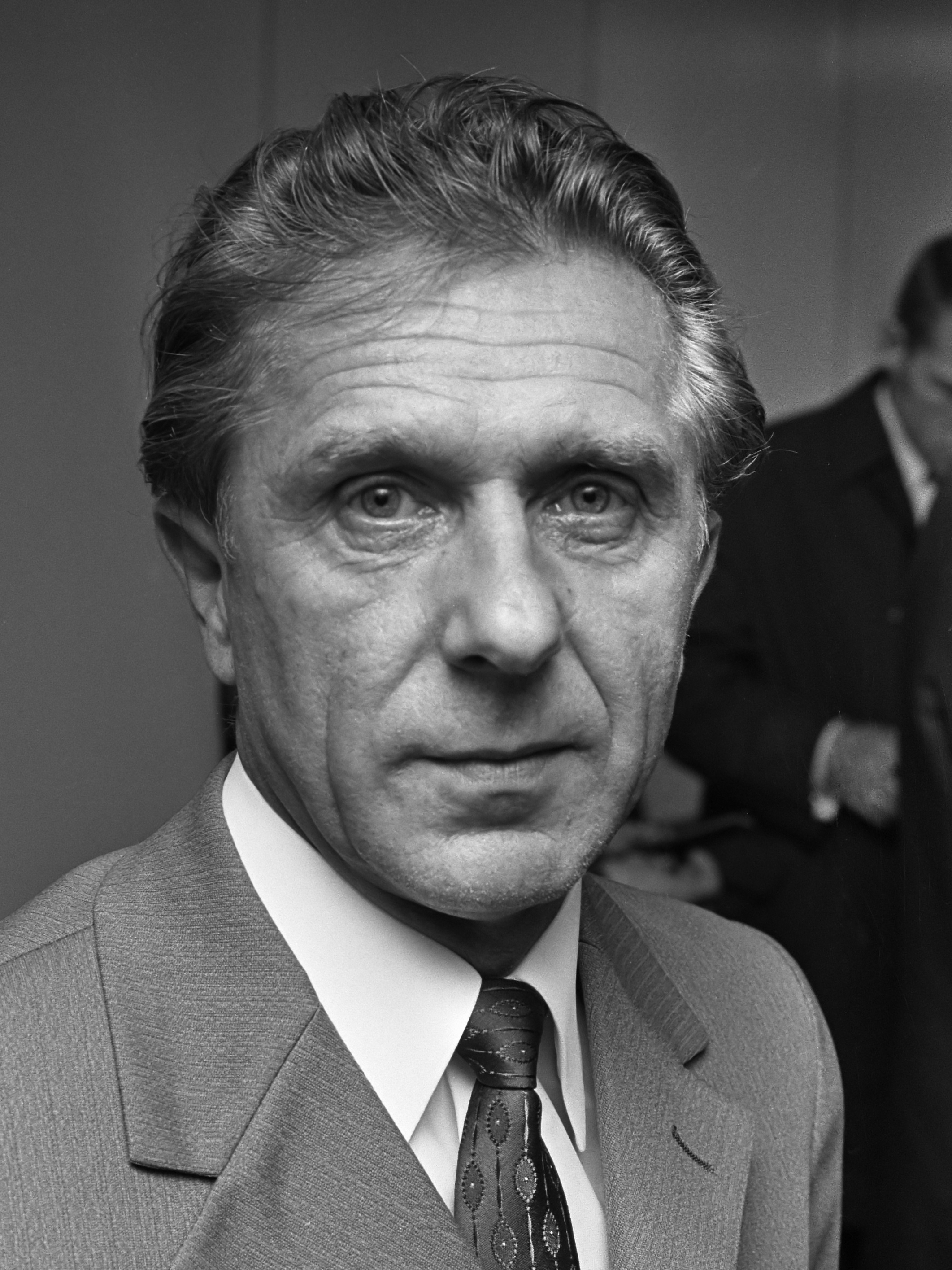
- Fritzsch with Dynamo Dresden in 1971

Personal information
- Full name: Walter Fritzsch
- Date of birth: 21 November 1920
- Place of birth: Zwickau, Saxony, Germany
- Date of death: 15 October 1997 (aged 76)
- Place of death: Dresden, Germany
- Height: 1.60 m (5 ft 3 in)
- Position: Midfielder

Youth career
- 1927–1939: SC Planitz

Senior career*
| Years | Team | Apps | (Gls) |
| 1939–1940 | SC Planitz | | |
| 1940–1943 | VfL Leisnig | | |
| 1943 | BC Hartha | | |
- SV Döbeln (de)
| 1945– | Zwickau-Oberhohndorf | | |
| –1950 | BSG Wismut Crainsdorf | | |

Managerial career
- 1950–1952: BSG Zentra Wismut Aue
- 1952–1953: BSG Empor Lauter (de)
- 1953–1955: BSG Motor Dessau
- 1956–1957: SC Motor Karl-Marx-Stadt
- 1958: BSG Stahl Riesa
- 1959–1965: SC Empor Rostock
- 1965–1969: BSG Stahl Riesa (de)
- 1969–1978: Dynamo Dresden
- 1978–1989: DFV der DDR
- * Club domestic league appearances and goals

Walter Fritzsch (21 November 1920 – 15 October 1997) was a German football player and manager.

== Playing career ==
Born on 21 November 1920, Fritzsch began his career as a player in 1927 with SC Planitz. In 1940, he transferred to VfL Leisnig and played there until 1943 after which he played for several other clubs including BC Hartha, SV Döbeln and Zwickau-Oberhohndorf. After World War II, he stayed in what would become East Germany and finished his playing days with Wismut Cainsdorf in 1950.

== Coaching career ==
Fritzsch's playing career ended due to a back injury, he became a coach with Wismut Aue in 1950. Fritzsch then went on to work as trainer with a number of sides between 1952 and 1969 including Empor Lauter, Motor Dessau, SC Motor Karl-Marx-Stadt, SC Empor Rostock (where he earned three vice-championships) and Stahl Riesa.

=== Dynamo Dresden ===
Fritzsch joined Dynamo Dresden as a coach on 30 June 1969 and the club soon began the most successful period of its history. Under his guidance the black and yellow won five East German championships in the first division DDR-Oberliga (1970–71, 1972–73, 1975–76, 1976–77 and 1977–78). The team also captured two East German Cups (FDGB-Pokal) in 1971 and 1977, and made 42 European Cup appearances. During his career the small, strict trainer also coached 40 national team players and helped uncover talents such as Ulf Kirsten and Matthias Sammer.

== Later career ==
Fritzsch was succeeded as trainer at Dynamo by Gerhard Prautzsch and moved on to work for the East German Football Association (DFV), responsible for youth selections until 1989, when he retired. Over his career he had coached 1,900 games, coming away with 1,163 victories. His opinion was still sought out by his former club Dynamo Dresden when they became one of two former East German sides to join the Bundesliga after German reunification in 1990.

== Death ==
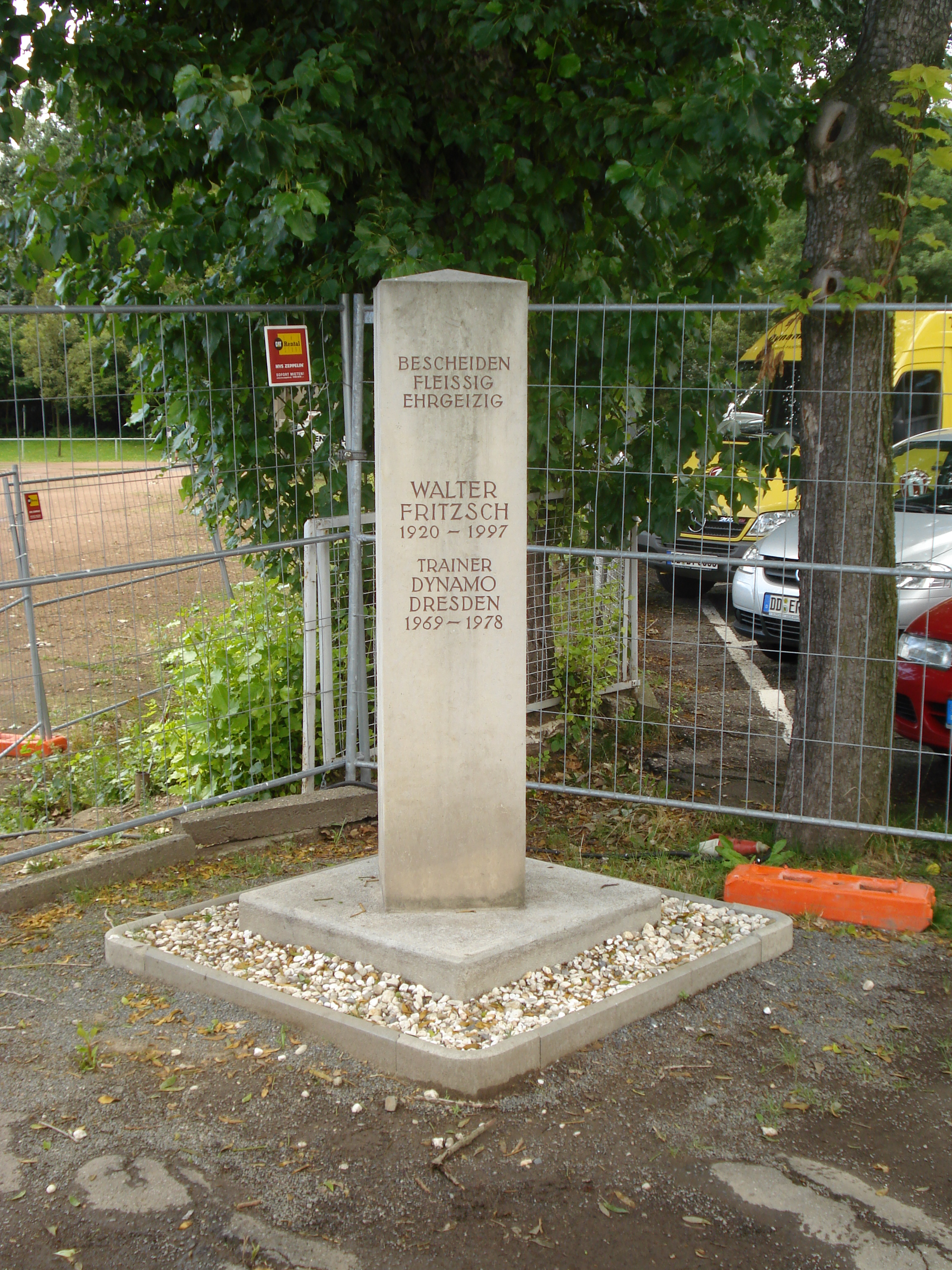

Fritzsch died on 15 October 1997, shortly before his 77th birthday. The "Small General" was buried in the Heidefriedhof Dresden Cemetery. He was subsequently honored with a monument in the Rudolf Harbig Stadion, home of Dynamo Dresden, and an annual football tournament in Dresden has been organized in his memory. Today a movie filmed movie about his career at the SG Dynamo Dresden.

== Honours ==
=== Club ===
Dynamo Dresden

- DDR-Oberliga: 1970–71, 1972–73, 1975–76, 1976–77, 1977–78
- FDGB-Pokal: 1970–71, 1976–77

== See also ==
- List of football managers with the most matches

== Literature ==
- Dynamo Dresden 1953–1983. ISBN 3-9803346-3-5; Publisher's: Thom Vlg., Leipzig (1993)
