= 1923 German football championship =

1923 German championship
Deutsche Fußballmeisterschaft
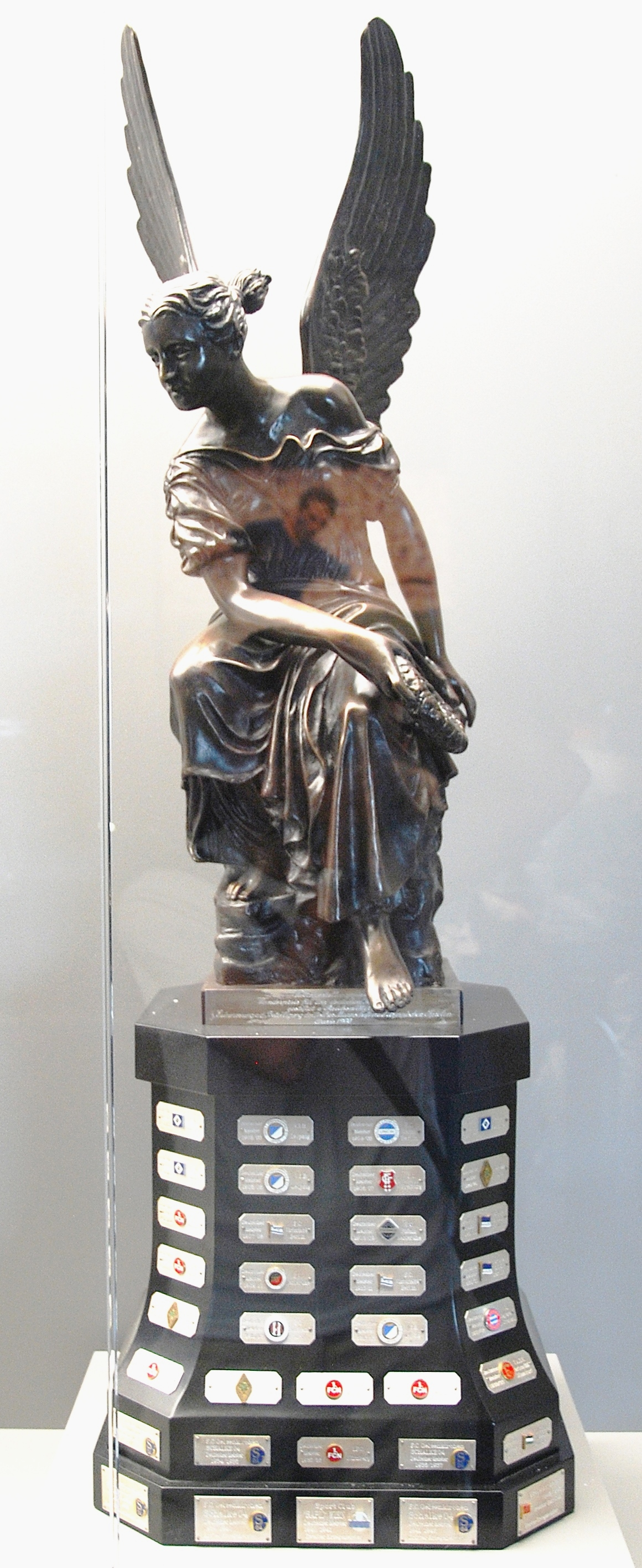
- Replica of the Viktoria trophy

Tournament details
- Country: Germany
- Dates: 6 May – 10 June
- Teams: 7

Final positions
- Champions: Hamburger SV; 1st German title
- Runners-up: Union Oberschöneweide

Tournament statistics
- Matches played: 7
- Goals scored: 20 (2.86 per match)
- Top goal scorer: Otto Harder (5 goals)

The 1923 German football championship, the 16th edition of the competition, was won by Hamburger SV, defeating Union Oberschöneweide 3–0 in the final.

For Hamburger SV it was the first national championship, having played in the inconclusive 1922 final and declined the championship. Hamburg would make another appearance in the final in the following season but lose to 1. FC Nürnberg, followed by another championship in 1928, won against another club from Berlin, Hertha BSC. Union Oberschöneweide made its sole championship final appearance in 1923 and would eventually evolve into what is now 1. FC Union Berlin.

Hamburg's Tull Harder was the top scorer of the 1923 championship with five goals, having previously done so in 1922 and, again, in 1926 and 1928.

Seven clubs qualified for the knock-out competition, nominally the champions of each of the seven regional football championships. However, the Western German football championship was not contested in 1923 and a qualifying competition for the German football championship was held instead.

== Qualified teams ==
The teams qualified through the regional championships:

Club	Qualified as
VfB Königsberg	Baltic champions
Sportfreunde Breslau	South Eastern German champions
Union Oberschöneweide	Brandenburg champion
Guts Muts Dresden	Central German champions
Hamburger SV	Northern German champions
Arminia Bielefeld	Western German championship representative
SpVgg Fürth	Southern German champions

== Competition ==
=== Quarter-finals ===
The quarter-finals, played on 6 and 13 May 1923, with the replay played on 20 May:

Team 1	Score	Team 2
Hamburger SV	2–0	Guts Muts Dresden
SpVgg Fürth	4–0	Sportfreunde Breslau
Union Oberschöneweide	0–0	Arminia Bielefeld

- VfB Königsberg received a bye for the quarter-finals

==== Replay ====
Team 1	Score	Team 2
Union Oberschöneweide	2–1	Arminia Bielefeld

=== Semi-finals ===
The semi-finals, played on 27 May 1923:

Team 1	Score	Team 2
Hamburger SV	3–2	VfB Königsberg
Union Oberschöneweide	2–1	SpVgg Fürth

=== Final ===
10 June 1923
c. 16:05 CET

Union Oberschöneweide	0–3	Hamburger SV
	Report	Harder 34'; Breuel 70'; Schneider 90'

Deutsches Stadion, Berlin
Attendance: 64,000
Referee: P. Brucker (Stuttgart)

UNION OBERSCHÖNEWEIDE
GK	(Weimar Republic) Franz Müller
RB	(Weimar Republic) Ernst Standke (c)
LB	(Weimar Republic) Franz Klautzsch
RH	(Weimar Republic) August Hamann
CH	(Weimar Republic) Otto Splittgerber
LH	(Weimar Republic) Otto Martwig
OR	(Weimar Republic) Albert Dietz
IR	(Weimar Republic) Horst Franke
CF	(Weimar Republic) Hermann Lux
IL	(Weimar Republic) Max Franke
OL	(Weimar Republic) Willi Jachmann
Manager:
None

HAMBURGER SV
GK	(Weimar Republic) Hans Martens
RB	(Weimar Republic) Albert Beier
LB	(Weimar Republic) Marcel Speyer
RH	(Sweden) Otto Carlsson
CH	(Norway) Asbjørn Halvorsen
LH	(Weimar Republic) Hans Krohn
OR	(Weimar Republic) Walter Kolzen
IR	(Weimar Republic) Ludwig Breuel
CF	(Weimar Republic) Otto Harder (c)
IL	(Weimar Republic) Karl Schneider
OL	(Weimar Republic) Hans Rave
Manager:
(England) Albert Wilhelm Turner
