= 1904 German football championship final =

1904 German championship final
Endspiel um die Deutsche Fußballmeisterschaft
- Event: 1904 German football championship
VfB Leipzig	Britannia Berlin
- Match cancelled
- Date: 29 May 1904
- City: Kassel

The 1904 German football championship final was to decide the winner of the 1904 German football championship, the 2nd edition of the German football championship, a knockout football cup competition contested by the regional association winners to determine the national champions.

The match was supposed to be played on 29 May 1904 in Kassel between VfB Leipzig, the title holders, and Britannia Berlin. However, the final was not played, as the German Football Association (DFB) canceled it due to a protest by Karlsruher FV. Karlsruhe had protested the fact that matches had not been played on neutral ground as was stipulated by the rules. The DFB had already ignored this rule for financial reasons in the previous year, but this time Karlsruhe argued that some of their players could not travel to the match in Berlin, and this had caused Karlsruhe's defeat. As a result, the championship was annulled.

== Route to the final ==
The German football championship was an eight team single-elimination knockout cup competition, featuring the champions of the regional football associations. There were a total of two rounds leading up to the final. For all matches, the winner after 90 minutes advances. If still tied, extra time was used to determine the winner.

Note: In all results below, the score of the finalist is given first (H: home; A: away).

VfB Leipzig		Round	Britannia Berlin
Opponent	Result	1904 German football championship	Opponent	Result
Viktoria 96 Magdeburg (H)	1–0	Preliminary round	Karlsruher FV (H)	6–1
Duisburger SpV (H)	3–2 (a.e.t.)	Semi-finals	Germania Hamburg (A)	3–1

== Cancellation ==
Shortly before the final, Karlsruher FV filed a protest with the DFB, questioning the validity of this championship. The DFB had not complied with the championship rules stating that the games must be played at a neutral venue. Karlsruhe was eliminated in the quarter-finals with a 1–6 defeat to finalists Britannia Berlin. Karlsruhe argued that they had lost due to the match taking place in Berlin, as some of their starting players could not get permission from their employers to leave for the match, which would have been necessary for the long journey to Berlin and back. In addition, Karlsruhe questioned the travel expenses; Karlsruhe had asked for a refund of the 2nd class train tickets from the DFB, but this only applied to 3rd class tickets. The DFB, at its annual Bundestag in Kassel on the day of the final, decided in the morning to cancel the championship final.

On the same day, the reigning DFB president Ferdinand Hueppe, as representative of DFC Prag, resigned from his position at the DFB, a day after joining FIFA. Ironically, the new chairman of the DFB selected on that day was Karlsruhe teacher Friedrich Wilhelm Nohe, the president of the Southern German Football Association and long-time chairman of Karlsruher FV.

== Match ==
=== Details ===
29 May 1904

VfB Leipzig	Match cancelled	Britannia Berlin
	Report

Kassel

Match rules

- 90 minutes.
- 30 minutes of extra time if necessary.
- Unlimited 10 minute intervals of sudden death extra time if scores still level.
- Replay at the referee's discretion if no winner.
- No substitutions.
