= 1936–37 Gauliga =

Gauliga
- Season: 1936–37
- Champions: 16 regional winners
- Relegated: 33 clubs
- German champions: Schalke 04; 3rd German title

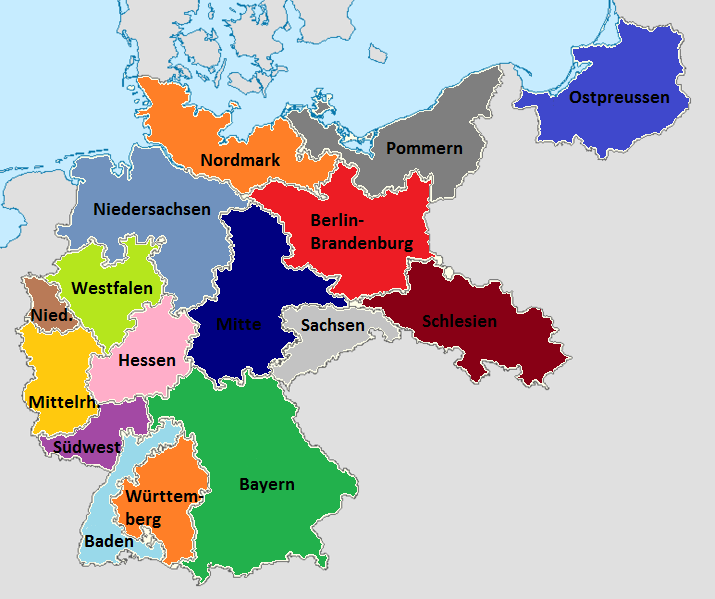
The initial 16 districts of the Gauliga in 1933

The 1936–37 Gauliga was the fourth season of the Gauliga, the first tier of the football league system in Germany from 1933 to 1945.

The league operated in sixteen regional divisions, of which two, the Gauliga Ostpreußen and Gauliga Pommern, were sub-divided into four and two regional groups respectively, with the league containing 183 clubs all up, the same number as the previous season. The league champions entered the 1937 German football championship, won by FC Schalke 04 who defeated 1. FC Nürnberg 2–0 in the final. It was Schalke's third national championship, with the club winning six all up during the Gauliga era of German football from 1933 to 1945.

Two clubs remained unbeaten during the league season, those being FC Schalke 04 and SV 06 Kassel. Of those Schalke would go on to remain unbeaten during the German championship as well while Kassel would lose five out of six finals games. At the other end of the table only one club finished the season without a win, SC Göttingen 05. FC Schalke 04 scored the most goals of any Gauliga club with 103 while Sperber Hamburg conceded the most with 98. FC Schalke 04 achieved the highest points total with 35 while SC Göttingen 05 earned the least with one point to its name.

The 1936–37 season saw the third edition of the Tschammerpokal, now the DFB-Pokal. The 1937 edition was won by FC Schalke 04, defeating Fortuna Düsseldorf 2–1 on 9 January 1938. thereby becoming the first club in Germany to win the double, something not repeated until FC Bayern Munich won it in 1968–69.

== Champions ==
The 1936–37 Gauliga champions qualified for the group stage of the German championship. VfB Stuttgart, Hamburger SV, 1. FC Nürnberg and FC Schalke 04 won their championship groups and advanced to the semi-finals with the latter two reaching the championship final which Schalke won.

FC Schalke 04 won their fourth consecutive Gauliga title while Hertha BSC, won their third consecutive one and Fortuna Düsseldorf, SV Waldhof Mannheim, 1. FC Nürnberg, SV Werder Bremen and Viktoria Stolp defended their 1935–36 Gauliga titles.

Club	League	No. of clubs
SV Waldhof Mannheim	Gauliga Baden	10
1. FC Nürnberg	Gauliga Bayern (1936–37 season)	10
Hertha BSC	Gauliga Berlin-Brandenburg	10
SV 06 Kassel	Gauliga Hessen	10
SV Dessau 05	Gauliga Mitte	10
VfR Köln	Gauliga Mittelrhein	11
Fortuna Düsseldorf	Gauliga Niederrhein	10
SV Werder Bremen	Gauliga Niedersachsen	10
Hamburger SV	Gauliga Nordmark	10
Hindenburg Allenstein	Gauliga Ostpreußen	28
Viktoria Stolp	Gauliga Pommern	14
BC Hartha	Gauliga Sachsen	10
Beuthener SuSV 09	Gauliga Schlesien	10
Wormatia Worms	Gauliga Südwest	10
FC Schalke 04	Gauliga Westfalen	10
VfB Stuttgart	Gauliga Württemberg	10
