= 1930 German football championship =

1930 German championship
Deutsche Fußballmeisterschaft
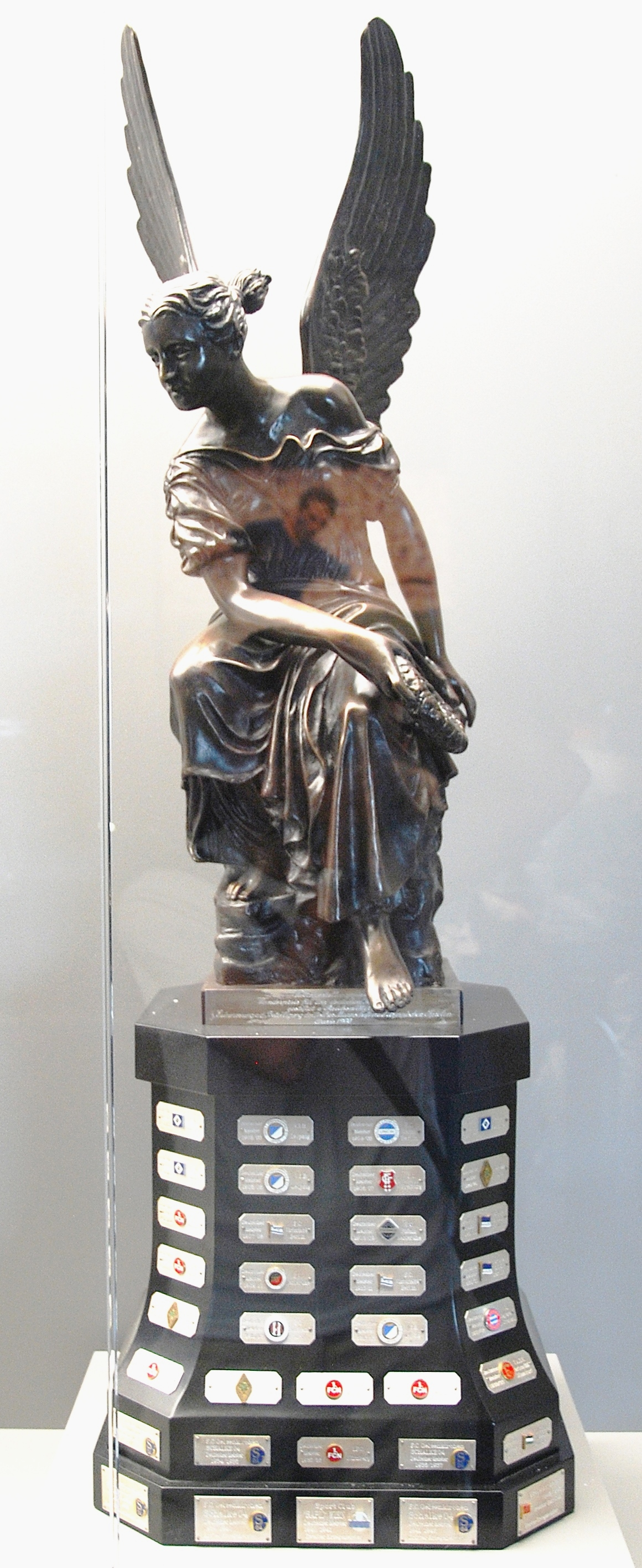
- Replica of the Viktoria trophy

Tournament details
- Country: Germany
- Dates: 18 May – 22 June
- Teams: 16

Final positions
- Champions: Hertha BSC; 1st German title
- Runner-up: Holstein Kiel

Tournament statistics
- Matches played: 16
- Goals scored: 102 (6.38 per match)
- Top goal scorer(s): Josef Schmitt (7 goals)

The 1930 German football championship, the 23rd edition of the competition, was won by Hertha BSC, defeating Holstein Kiel 5–4 in the final.

For Hertha it was the fifth consecutive final the club played in and the first championship the club won, having lost all four previous finals. Hertha would go on to win the 1931 final as well and thereby become only the second club, after 1. FC Nürnberg, to defend its title. For Holstein Kiel it was the third and last appearance in the final, having lost the 1910 one and won two years later in 1912, both against Karlsruher FV.

The final itself equaled the then-record of goals scored, nine, set in 1903. Hertha fell behind twice in the game, 0–2 and 2–3, before Hans Ruch scored the winning ninth goal of the game in the 87th minute.

1. FC Nürnberg's Josef Schmitt was the top scorer of the 1930 championship with seven goals.

Sixteen clubs qualified for the knock-out competition, two from each of the regional federations plus an additional third club from the South and West. In all cases the regional champions qualified and almost all of the runners-up, except in Central Germany where the second spot went to the regional cup winner. In the West the third spot went to the third placed team of the championship while, in the South, the third spot was determined in a separate qualifying competition for runners-up and third placed teams.

== Qualified teams ==
The teams qualified through the regional championships:

Club	Qualified as
VfB Königsberg	Baltic champions
Titania Stettin	Baltic runners-up
Beuthener SuSV 09	South Eastern German champions
Sportfreunde Breslau	South Eastern German runners-up
Hertha BSC	Brandenburg champion
Tennis Borussia Berlin	Brandenburg runners-up
Dresdner SC	Central German champions
VfB Leipzig	Central German cup winner
Holstein Kiel	Northern German champions
Arminia Hannover	Northern German runners-up
Schalke 04	Western German champions
VfL 06 Benrath	Western German runners-up
SpVgg Sülz 07	Western German third placed team
Eintracht Frankfurt	Southern German champions
SpVgg Fürth	Southern German runners-up
1. FC Nürnberg	Southern German additional qualifier

== Competition ==
=== Round of 16 ===
The round of 16, played on 18 May 1930:

Team 1	Score	Team 2
Dresdner SC	8–1	VfB Königsberg
Eintracht Frankfurt	1–0	VfL 06 Benrath
Schalke 04	6–2	SV Arminia Hannover
Hertha BSC	3–2	Beuthen 09
Holstein Kiel	4–3	VfB Leipzig
Sportfreunde Breslau	0–7	1. FC Nürnberg
SpVgg Fürth	4–1	Tennis Borussia Berlin
Titania Stettin	2–4	SpVgg Köln/Sülz 07

=== Quarter-finals ===
The quarter-finals, played on 1 June 1930, with the replay held on 9 June:

Team 1	Score	Team 2
Dresdner SC	5–4	SpVgg Fürth
1. FC Nürnberg	6–2	Schalke 04
Holstein Kiel	4–2	Eintracht Frankfurt
SpVgg Köln/Sülz 07	1–1	Hertha BSC

==== Replay ====
Team 1	Score	Team 2
Hertha BSC	8–1	SpVgg Köln/Sülz 07

=== Semi-finals ===
The semi-finals, played on 15 June 1930:

Team 1	Score	Team 2
Hertha BSC	6–3	1. FC Nürnberg
Holstein Kiel	2–0	Dresdner SC

=== Final ===
The final, played on 22 June 1930:

Team 1	Score	Team 2
Hertha BSC	5–4	Holstein Kiel
