= 1931 German football championship =

1931 German championship
Deutsche Fußballmeisterschaft
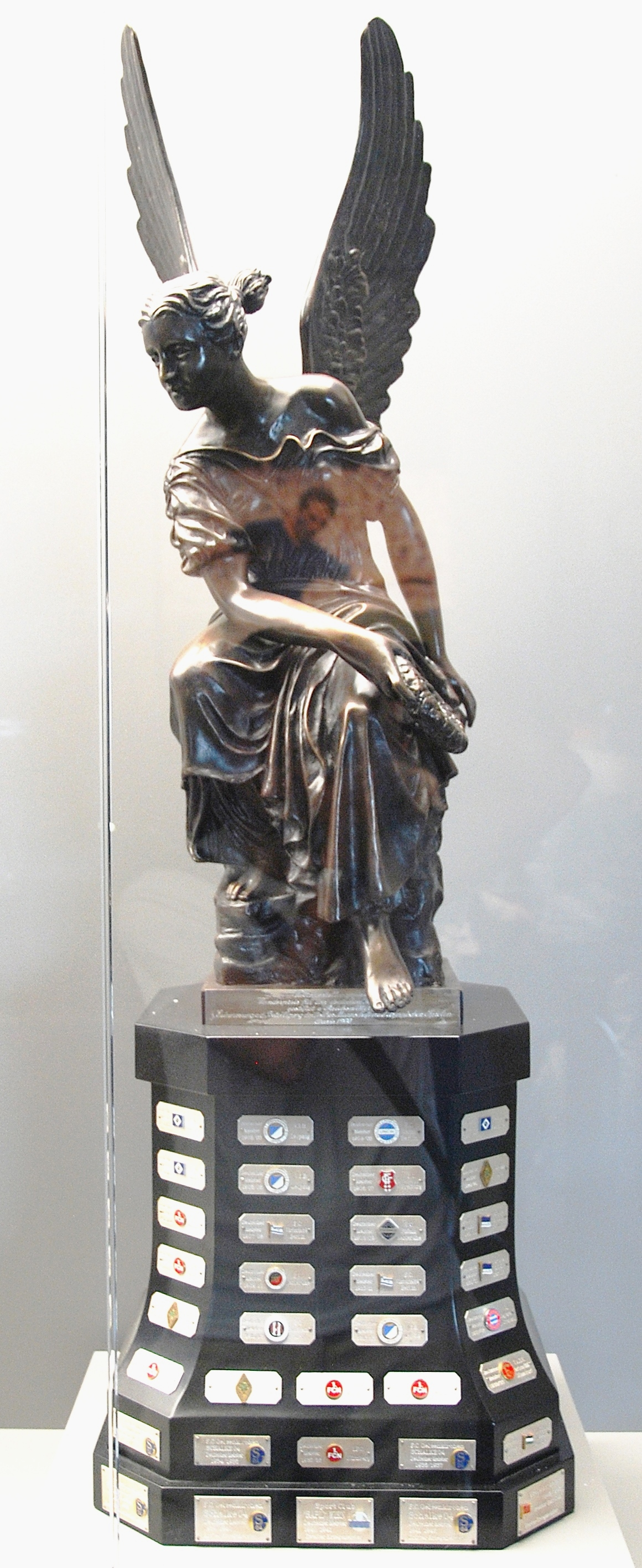
- Replica of the Viktoria trophy

Tournament details
- Country: Germany
- Dates: 10 May – 14 June
- Teams: 16

Final positions
- Champions: Hertha BSC; 2nd German title
- Runner-up: 1860 Munich

Tournament statistics
- Matches played: 15
- Goals scored: 69 (4.6 per match)
- Top goal scorer(s): Willi Kirsei (7 goals)

The 1931 German football championship, the 24th edition of the competition, was won by Hertha BSC, defeating TSV 1860 München 3–2 in the final.

For Hertha it was the sixth consecutive final the club played in and the second national championship, having won the previous edition. Hertha thereby became only the second club after 1. FC Nürnberg to defend its title. It marked however the end of Hertha's most successful era, with the club never again playing in another German championship final after 1931, as it did for clubs from Berlin, as no other club from the German capital would ever reach another German championship final again. For TSV 1860 it was the only championship final the club ever played in, having to wait until the Bundesliga era to win a championship. The following season the club's rival, FC Bayern Munich, would take out the only national championship for the city of Munich during the pre-Bundesliga era.

Hertha's Willi Kirsei was the top scorer of the 1931 championship with seven goals.

Sixteen club qualified for the knock-out competition, two from each of the regional federations plus an additional third club from the South and West. In all cases the regional champions qualified and almost all of the runners-up, except in Central Germany where the second spot went to the regional cup winner. In the West the third spot went to the third placed team of the championship while, in the South, the third spot was determined in a separate qualifying competition for runners-up and third placed teams.

== Qualified teams ==
The teams qualified through the regional championships:

Club	Qualified as
SV Prussia-Samland Königsberg	Baltic champions
VfB Königsberg	Baltic runners-up
Beuthener SuSV 09	South Eastern German champions
VfB Liegnitz	South Eastern German runners-up
Hertha BSC	Brandenburg champion
Tennis Borussia Berlin	Brandenburg runners-up
Dresdner SC	Central German champions
SpVgg Leipzig	Central German cup winner
Hamburger SV	Northern German champions
Holstein Kiel	Northern German runners-up
Fortuna Düsseldorf	Western German champions
VfB Bielefeld	Western German runners-up
Meidericher SV	Western German third placed team
SpVgg Fürth	Southern German champions
Eintracht Frankfurt	Southern German runners-up
TSV 1860 München	Southern German additional qualifier

== Competition ==
=== Round of 16 ===
The round of 16, played between 10 and 17 May 1931:

Team 1	Score	Team 2
Beuthen 09	0–2	Hamburger SV
Fortuna Düsseldorf	2–3	Eintracht Frankfurt
Holstein Kiel	3–2	Prussia Königsberg
SpVgg Leipzig	0–3	SpVgg Fürth
Tennis Borussia Berlin	6–1	VfB Liegnitz
TSV 1860 München	4–1	Meidericher SpV
VfB Bielefeld	2–5	Hertha BSC
VfB Königsberg	1–8	Dresdner SC

=== Quarter-finals ===
The quarter-finals, played on 17 and 24 May 1931:

Team 1	Score	Team 2
Dresdner SC	3–4	Holstein Kiel
Hamburger SV	2–0	Eintracht Frankfurt
Hertha BSC	3–1	SpVgg Fürth
TSV 1860 München	1–0	Tennis Borussia Berlin

=== Semi-finals ===
The semi-finals, played on 31 May 1931:

Team 1	Score	Team 2
Hertha BSC	3–2	Hamburger SV
TSV 1860 München	2–0	Holstein Kiel

=== Final ===
The final, played on 14 June 1931:

Team 1	Score	Team 2
Hertha BSC	3–2	TSV 1860 München
