= 1927 German football championship =

1927 German championship
Deutsche Fußballmeisterschaft
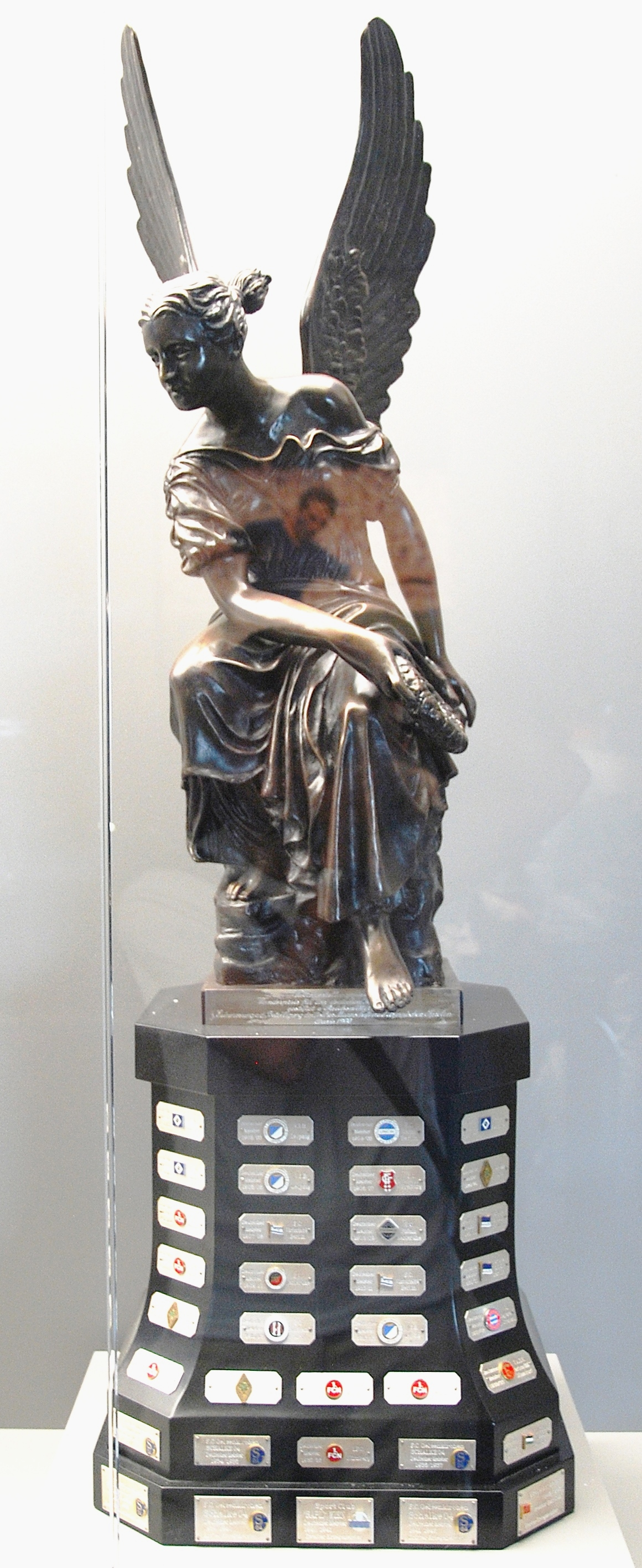
- Replica of the Viktoria trophy

Tournament details
- Country: Germany
- Dates: 8 May – 12 June
- Teams: 16

Final positions
- Champions: 1. FC Nürnberg; 5th German title
- Runner-up: Hertha BSC

Tournament statistics
- Matches played: 15
- Goals scored: 75 (5 per match)
- Top goal scorer(s): Andreas Franz (6 goals)

The 1927 German football championship, the 20th edition of the competition, was won by 1. FC Nürnberg, defeating Hertha BSC 2–0 in the final.

For 1. FC Nürnberg it was the fifth national championship. It brought to an end Nuremberg's most successful era where the club won five titles in eight seasons, missing out on a sixth one in the inconclusive 1922 championship. Nuremberg would have to wait nine seasons, until 1936, to win its sixth of eight titles in the German championship era from 1903 to 1963. For Hertha BSC it marked the second consecutive final loss, a series the club would extend to four in the following seasons. Hertha would than go on to win back-to-back championships in 1930 and 1931 for a record six consecutive final appearances.

SpVgg Fürth's Andreas Franz was the top scorer of the 1927 championship with six goals.

Sixteen club qualified for the knock-out competition, two from each of the regional federations plus an additional third club from the South and West. In all cases the regional champions and runners-up qualified. In the West the third spot went to the third placed team of the championship while, in the South, the third spot was determined in a separate qualifying competition for runners-up and third placed teams.

== Qualified teams ==
The teams qualified through the regional championships:

Club	Qualified as
Titania Stettin	Baltic champions
VfB Königsberg	Baltic runners-up
Sportfreunde Breslau	South Eastern German champions
FV Breslau 06	South Eastern German runners-up
Hertha BSC	Brandenburg champion
BSC Kickers 1900	Brandenburg runners-up
VfB Leipzig	Central German champions
Chemnitzer BC	Central German runners-up
Holstein Kiel	Northern German champions
Hamburger SV	Northern German runners-up
Duisburger SpV	Western German champions
Schalke 04	Western German runners-up
Fortuna Düsseldorf	Western German third placed team
1. FC Nürnberg	Southern German champions
SpVgg Fürth	Southern German runners-up
TSV 1860 München	Southern German additional qualifier

== Competition ==
=== Round of 16 ===
The round of 16, played on 8 May 1927:

Team 1	Score	Team 2
1. FC Nürnberg	5–1	Chemnitzer BC
Schalke 04	1–3	TSV 1860 München
Fortuna Düsseldorf	1–4	Hamburger SV
Holstein Kiel	9–1	Titania Stettin
BSC Kickers 1900 Berlin	5–4 aet	Duisburger SpV
Sportfreunde Breslau	1–3	SpVgg Fürth
VfB Königsberg	1–2	Hertha BSC
VfB Leipzig	3–0	FV Breslau 06

=== Quarter-finals ===
The quarter-finals, played on 22 May 1927:

Team 1	Score	Team 2
Hamburger SV	1–2	1. FC Nürnberg
Hertha BSC	4–2	Holstein Kiel
SpVgg Fürth	9–0	BSC Kickers 1900 Berlin
TSV 1860 München	3–0	VfB Leipzig

=== Semi-finals ===
The semi-finals, played on 29 May 1927:

Team 1	Score	Team 2
1. FC Nürnberg	4–1	TSV 1860 München
Hertha BSC	2–1	SpVgg Fürth

=== Final ===
The final, played on 12 June 1927:

Team 1	Score	Team 2
1. FC Nürnberg	2–0	Hertha BSC
