= Hartmut Weiß =

German footballer

Personal information
- Date of birth: 13 January 1942 (age 84)
- Place of birth: Silesia, Nazi Germany
- Height: 1.87 m (6 ft 2 in)
- Position: Forward

Youth career
- –1960: TSV Bernhausen

Senior career*
Years	Team	Apps	(Gls)
1960–1964	VfB Stuttgart Amateure		
1964–1968	VfB Stuttgart	74	(23)
1968–1970	Eintracht Braunschweig	60	(20)
1970–1971	VfB Stuttgart	34	(15)
1971–1972	Stuttgarter Kickers	0	(0)
- * Club domestic league appearances and goals

Hartmut Weiß (born 13 January 1942) is a German footballer who played as a forward.

He spent seven seasons in the Bundesliga with VfB Stuttgart and Eintracht Braunschweig. Weiß was among the players involved in the 1971 Bundesliga scandal, being sentenced to a lifetime ban in January 1972 for his participation in fixing a match of VfB Stuttgart against Arminia Bielefeld. He later received an amnesty, but never played professional football again.
