= 1904 German football championship =

1904 German championship
Deutsche Fußballmeisterschaft
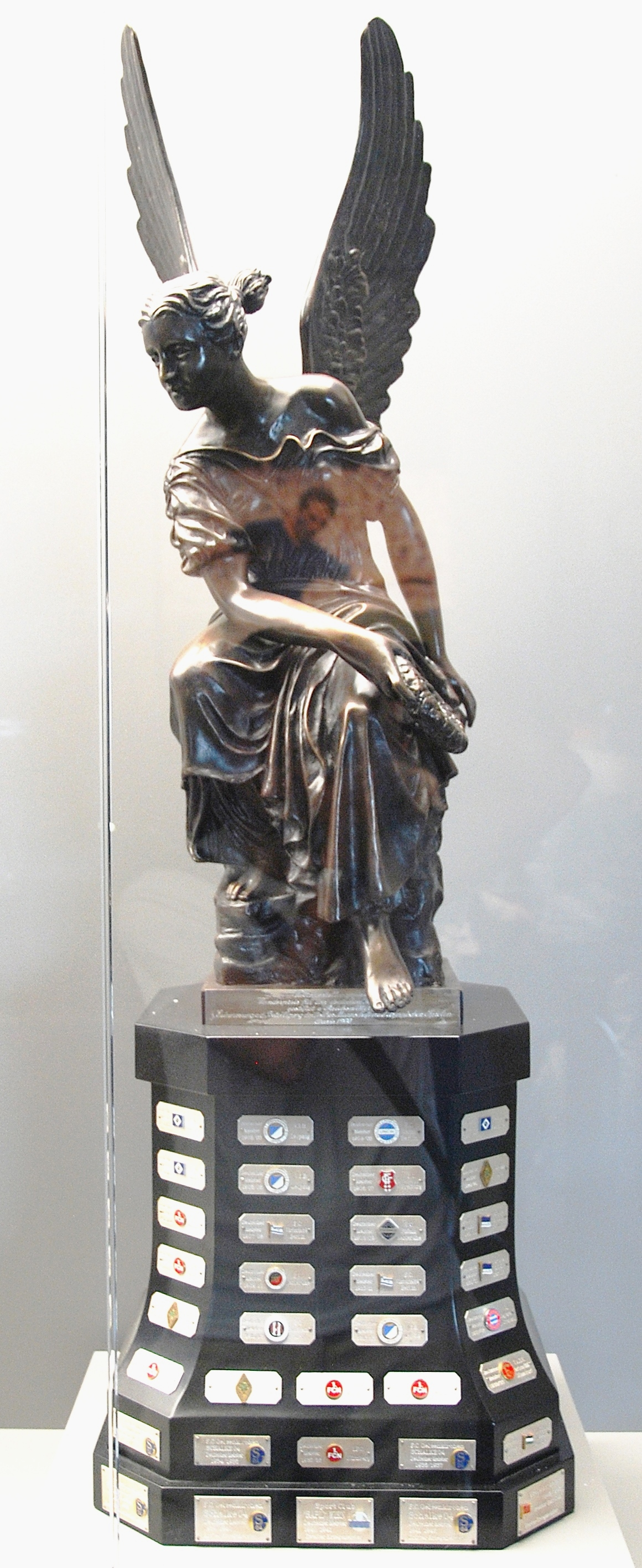
- Replica of the Viktoria trophy

Tournament details
- Country: Germany
- Dates: 24 April – 29 May
- Teams: 8

Final positions
- Champions: No champion declared

Tournament statistics
- Matches played: 6
- Goals scored: 36 (6 per match)
- Top goal scorer(s): Unknown (Note: Scorers are known for only 17 of the 36 goals. The scorers in the Duisburger SpV v Casseler FV and Germania Hamburg v ARBV Hannover matches are not known. Erich Müller and Ernst Perry are the top known goalscorers, with 2 goals each.)

The 1904 German football championship was the second competition to determine the national champion of Germany.

The competition was not fully played, however, as the German Football Association (DFB) aborted it due to a protest by Karlsruher FV. Karlsruhe had protested the fact that matches had not been played on neutral ground as was stipulated by the rules. The DFB had already ignored this rule for financial reasons in the previous year, but this time Karlsruhe argued that some of their players could not travel to the match in Berlin and this had caused Karlsruhe's defeat. As a result, the championship was annulled.

As in the previous season, all champions of local and regional associations were allowed to enter the competition, but clubs from outside Germany were excluded. Eight clubs eventually entered the competition, two more than in the year before.

== Qualified teams ==
The qualified teams:

Qualified team	Qualified from
Britannia Berlin	VBB champions
VfB Leipzig	Central German champions and defending champions
Viktoria 96 Magdeburg	Magdeburg champions
Germania Hamburg	HAFB champions
ARBV Hannover	Hanover champions
Casseler FV	Kassel champions
Duisburger SpV	Western German champions
Karlsruher FV	Southern German champions

== Competition ==
=== Quarter-finals ===
24 April 1904 Quarter-final	Britannia Berlin	6 – 1	Karlsruher FV	Berlin
	R. Müller 6' (pen.); Jakob 39'; Häfner 49' (o.g.); E. Müller 57'; Perry 60'; Damaschke 68'		Faber 30' (o.g.)	Referee: Behr

8 May 1904 Quarter-final	Duisburger SpV	5 – 3	FV Kassel	Duisburg
				Referee: Roth

24 April 1904 Quarter-final	Germania Hamburg	11 – 0	Hannover 96	Hamburg
				Referee: Hiller

24 April 1904 Quarterfinal	VfB Leipzig	1 – 0	Viktoria 96 Magdeburg	Leipzig
	Stollberg 65' (o.g.)			Referee: Neumann

=== Semi-finals ===
8 May 1904 Semi-final	Germania Hamburg	1 – 3	Britannia Berlin	Hamburg
	Willis 65'		Schmidt 9'; Müller 13'; Perry 40'	Referee: Matthes

12 May 1904 Semi-final	VfB Leipzig	3 – 2 (a.e.t.)	Duisburger SpV	Leipzig
	Oppermann 52'; Stanischewski 85'; Schneider 132'		Fischer 25'; Van der Weppen 78'	Referee: Neumann

=== Final ===
29 May 1904

VfB Leipzig	Match cancelled	Britannia Berlin
	Report

Kassel
