= Henrik Nádler =

Hungarian footballer (1901–1944)

Personal information
- Date of birth: 19 March 1901
- Place of birth: Budapest, Austria-Hungary
- Date of death: 12 May 1944 (aged 43)
- Place of death: Buchenwald concentration camp, Weimar, Nazi Germany
- Position: Left midfielder

Senior career*
Years	Team	Apps	(Gls)
1919–1930	MTK Budapest		

International career
1924–1926	Hungary	7	(0)
- * Club domestic league appearances and goals

Henrik Nádler (19 March 1901 – 12 May 1944) was a Hungarian international footballer who played as a left midfielder. He was a seven-time Hungarian champion while playing for MTK Budapest.

== Biography ==
Nádler was born in Budapest and was Jewish. He was the son of Izsák, a suitcase maker, and Roza Acht, and had six siblings: Bertalan, Emma, Gizella, Illés, Renee, and Rozalia.

He played football for MTK Budapest between 1919 and 1930. Nádler was a seven-time league champion for MTK (1919–20, 1920–21, 1921–22, 1922–23, 1923–24, 1924–25, and 1928–29) and two-time Hungarian Cup winner (1923 and 1925). He scored six goals in 107 matches in all competitions for the club.

Between 1924 and 1926, Nádler earned seven caps for the Hungary national team. He was a member of the team that participated in the 1924 Summer Olympics, but he did not play in any matches.

Nádler died as a laborer at the hands of the Nazis during World War II. While the place and time of his death is given in some sources as Mauthausen concentration camp in 1945, he died in Germany, in Buchenwald concentration camp, on 12 May 1944.
