= Josef Schmitt (footballer) =

German footballer (1908–1980)

Personal information
- Date of birth: 21 March 1908
- Place of birth: Nuremberg, Germany
- Date of death: 16 April 1980 (aged 72)
- Position: Forward

Senior career*
Years	Team	Apps	(Gls)
1926–1940	1. FC Nürnberg		

International career
1928	Germany	2	(1)
- * Club domestic league appearances and goals

Josef Schmitt (21 March 1908 – 16 April 1980) was a German international footballer who played for 1. FC Nürnberg. In 1928, he appeared twice for the Germany national team, scoring one goal. He was also part of Germany's team at the 1928 Summer Olympics, but he did not play in any matches.
