= Erich Gleixner =

German footballer

Personal information
- Date of birth: 1 April 1920
- Date of death: 22 January 1962 (aged 41)

International career
Years	Team	Apps	(Gls)
1952	Germany		

Erich Gleixner (1 April 1920 – 22 January 1962) was a German footballer who competed in the 1952 Summer Olympics.
