= Otto Martwig =

German footballer

Personal information
- Date of birth: 24 February 1903
- Place of birth: Berlin, Germany
- Date of death: May 1945 (aged 42)
- Position: Midfielder

Senior career*
| Years | Team | Apps | (Gls) |
| 1919–1925 | Union Oberschöneweide | | |
| 1925–1932 | Tennis Borussia Berlin | | |

International career
| 1925–1927 | Germany | 6 | (0) |
- * Club domestic league appearances and goals

Otto Martwig (24 February 1903 – May 1945) was a German footballer who played for Union Oberschöneweide, Tennis Borussia Berlin and the Germany national team.
