= Hermann Lux (footballer) =

German footballer

Personal information
- Full name: Hermann Lux
- Date of birth: 20 September 1893
- Place of birth: Berlin, German Reich
- Date of death: 3 January 1962 (aged 68)
- Place of death: West Germany

Senior career*
Years	Team	Apps	(Gls)
1922–1923	Union Oberschöneweide		
1923–1932	Tennis Borussia Berlin		

International career
1924–1925	Germany	3	(0)

Managerial career
- 1953–1954: Tennis Borussia Berlin
- * Club domestic league appearances and goals

Hermann Lux (20 September 1893 – 3 January 1962) was a German footballer.

Lux won three caps for the Germany national football team during his playing career. He later went on to become manager at Tennis Borussia Berlin.
