= SV Cainsdorf =

German football club

- Full name: Sportverein Cainsdorf e.V.
- Founded: 1919 (ATB Cainsdorf); 1945 as SG Cainsdorf
- Dissolved: 1933 (ATB Cainsdorf); 2011 (SV Cainsdorf)
- Ground: Sportplatz am Turnerheim
- Website: http://www.svcainsdorf.de/

SV Cainsdorf was a German association football club from the district of Cainsdorf in the city of Zwickau, Saxony. The origins of the club are in the establishment in 1919 of ATB Cainsdorf, a worker's club that was part of the ATSB. In 1933, with the rise to power of the Nazis left-leaning worker's clubs and clubs with religious affiliations were banned as politically unpalatable to the regime.

The club was re-established in 1945 following World War II as SG Cainsdorf and spent two seasons as part of the Landesliga Sachsen in 1947–49. Germany was divided after the war and a separate football competition emerged in what became East Germany. In 1949, SG was briefly a department of Mechanik Cainsdorf before becoming independent again as the industrial club Betrieb für Bergbau und Aufbereitungsanlagen Cainsdorf before playing as BAC Wismut Cainsdorf.

The longtime local side advanced to third division play in the Bezirksliga Karl-Marx-Stadt where they earned mid-table results until slipping back to fourth-tier play after the 1967–68 season. In 1990, following the reunification of Germany, the club took on the name Sportverein Cainsdorf. In 2011 it last played in the Kreisklasse Zwickau, where it finished last but was not relegated as it folded after the season.
