= ATV Liegnitz =

German association football club

- Full name: Alter Turnverein 1852 Liegnitz
- Founded: 1852/1896
- Dissolved: 1945
Home colours	Away colours

ATV Liegnitz was a German association football club from what was then the city of Liegnitz, Lower Silesia in Germany, but is today Legnica, Poland. The origins of the club were in the establishment of the gymnastics club Alter Turnverein Liegnitz in 1852, which formed a football department in July 1896.

== History ==
The footballers played in the Südostdeutscher Fußballverband (Southeast German Football Association) and made regular appearances in the playoffs into the early 1920s. They were unable to advance past the semifinals in three tries from 1907 to 1909 and were quickly eliminated in the early qualification round in each of the following two seasons.

ATV enjoyed its greatest success in 1912 when they beat Preußen Görlitz 2:0 in qualifying and then advanced on a bye to the Südost final where they defeated Germania Breslau 5:1. That title win put the team into the national playoffs where they were eliminated in the quarterfinals by SpVgg Leipzig (2:3). In the two seasons of play remaining before the outbreak of World War I Liegnitz was put out of the playoffs in the early going.

Football competition in many parts of Germany was interrupted between 1914 and 1918 by the war. Play in the SOFV was greatly reduced, but was resumed with the 1919–20 season. ATV continued to field competitive sides following the conflict and they appeared in league playoffs in 1920–21 and 1923 before the performance of the club began to slip. In 1924 the footballers left to form the independent club Sportvereinigung 1896 Liegnitz which made only a single playoff appearance in 1926 before slipping into lower-tier play.

In 1933, German football was reorganized under the Third Reich into 16 top-flight regional leagues, including the Gauliga Schlesien. In the 1939–40 season this league was expanded from 10 to 16 clubs and split into two divisions, the Staffel Oberschlesien and the Staffel Mittel- und Niederschlesien. SV joined the latter division and finished in second place.

The invasion of Poland that began World War II led to play in the SOFV again being disrupted. SV briefly disappeared from first-division competition before being reunited with parent club ATV to become Nationalsozialistiche Turn- und Sportgemeinschaft Liegnitz. The combined side NTSG Liegnitz, or commonly TuSpo Liegnitz, rejoined what was now the Gauliga Niederschlesien (I) for the 1941–42 season and the club earned indifferent results over two campaigns. As the war turned against Germany, travel became increasing difficult and play became more local in character. The Gauliga broke up into four divisions that played shortened schedule followed by a round robin final that NTSG failed to qualify for. By 1944 the Gauliga Niederschlesien collapsed and ATV Liegnitz disappeared in 1945 with the end of the war as the city became part of Poland.

== Honours ==
- South Eastern German champions: 1912

== Stadium ==
The club played it home matches at one of two stadiums; 96er Kampfbahn am Kreiskrankenhaus or Jahnsportplatz an Schützenhaus.
