= BC Hartha =

German football club

- Full name: Ballspiel-Club Hartha e.V.
- Founded: 1913
- League: Kreisliga A Muldental-Süd (IX)
- 2015–16: 3rd
Home colours	Away colours

BC Hartha is a German association football club from the town of Hartha, Saxony.

== History ==
The club was established 13 July 1913 and first emerged from local level competition in the mid-1930s by capturing the Bezirksklasse Mittelsachsen (II) title in 1935 and then winning a promotion playoff to advance to the Gauliga Sachsen, one of sixteen regional top-flight divisions established in the 1933 re-organization of German football under the Third Reich. Hartha fielded competitive sides through the balance of the decade and on to the end of World War II in 1945. The team captured division titles in 1937 and 1938 and delivered a number of top three finishes. Those titles earned BC a place in the national playoffs, but they were unable to progress beyond the opening group stage. They also made appearances in play for the Tschammerpokal, predecessor to today's DFB-Pokal (German Cup), in 1935–39 and 1941, and sent a representative to the national team in 1939.

They slipped briefly from first division competition in 1941 but returned after just a single season absence. As the war overtook the country, play became more local in character and in 1944 BC became part of the Gauliga Chemnitz which collapsed early in the 1944–45 season.

Following the war the former membership of BC was re-formed as Sportgemeinde Hartha which became part of the separate football competition that emerged in East Germany. The team was renamed BSG Industrie Hartha in 1949 and again in 1952 as BSG Fortschritt Hartha. From 1953 until 1958, BSG was part of the second tier DDR-Liga before slipping to the Bezirksliga Leipzig, where they played as an anonymous lower division side over the next three decades. On 18 August 1990, as the reunification of Germany approached, the club reassumed its traditional identity as BC Hartha.

The club has been playing in the lower amateur leagues in its recent history, competing in the tier nine Kreisliga A since 2013.

== Honours ==
- Gauliga Sachsen (I)
  - Champions: 1937, 1938

== Notable players ==
- Walter Fritzsch
- Erich Gleixner
- Erich Hänel
