= Ernst Hollstein =

German footballer

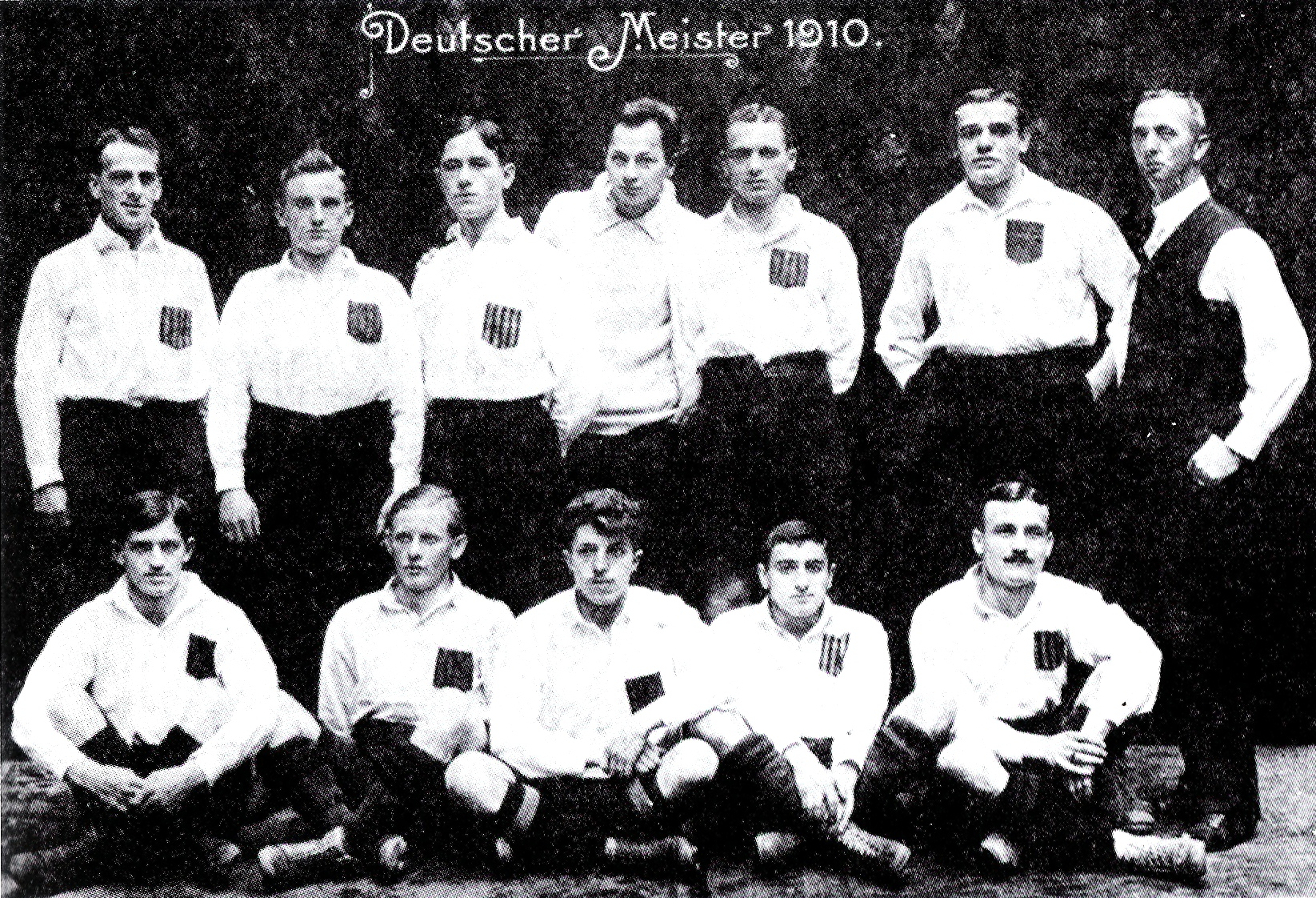
- Hollstein (sitting, second from left) in 1910

Personal information
- Date of birth: 9 December 1886
- Place of birth: Karlsruhe, Germany
- Date of death: 9 August 1950 (aged 63)

International career
Years	Team	Apps	(Gls)
1912	Germany	1	(-)

Ernst Hollstein (9 December 1886 in Karlsruhe – 9 August 1950) was a German amateur football (soccer) player who competed in the 1912 Summer Olympics. He was a member of the German Olympic squad and played one match in the main tournament as well as in the consolation tournament.
