= Georg Krogmann =

German footballer

Personal information
- Date of birth: 4 September 1886
- Place of birth: Kiel, Germany
- Date of death: 9 January 1915 (aged 28)
- Position: Midfielder

International career
Years	Team	Apps	(Gls)
1912	Germany	3	

Georg Krogmann (4 September 1886 in Kiel – 9 January 1915) was a German amateur footballer who played as a midfielder and competed in the 1912 Summer Olympics. He was a member of the German Olympic squad and played one match in the main tournament as well as one match in the consolation tournament. All in all he scored 3 Caps.

He died during World War I.

== See also ==
- List of Olympians killed in World War I
