= Willi Fick =

German footballer

Personal information
- Full name: Willi Fick
- Date of birth: 17 February 1891
- Place of birth: Lurup, Germany
- Date of death: 5 September 1913 (aged 22)
- Position: Forward

Senior career*
Years	Team	Apps	(Gls)
1908–1913	Holstein Kiel		

International career
1910	Germany	1	(1)
- * Club domestic league appearances and goals

Willi Fick (17 February 1891 – 5 September 1913) was a German international footballer who played for Holstein Kiel. He also won one cap for the Germany national team in 1910.

His brother Hugo Fick was also a footballer.
