= Hermann Bosch =

German footballer

Personal information
- Born: 10 March 1891; Öhningen am Bodensee, Germany
- Died: 15 November 1916 (aged 25)

Sport
- Country: Germany
- Sport: Football
- Position: Midfielder

Achievements and titles
- Olympic finals: 1912 Summer Olympics

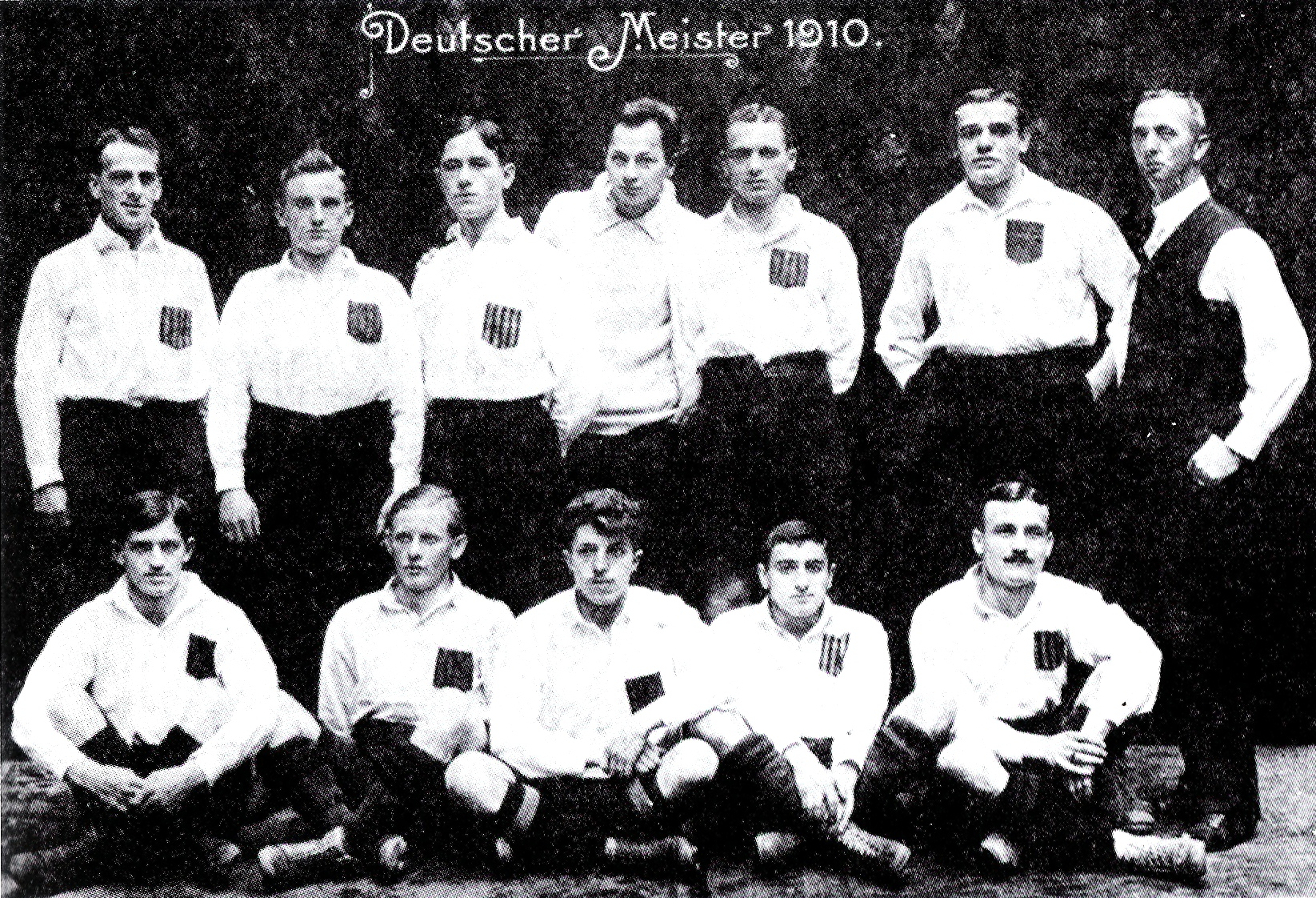
Bosch (third from left, top row) on the Karlsruher championship team in 1910.

Hermann Bosch (10 March 1891 – 15 November 1916) was a German international footballer who played as a midfielder and competed in the 1912 Summer Olympics. He was born in Öhningen am Bodensee. He was a member of the German Olympic squad and played one match in the main tournament as well as one match in the consolation tournament. He was killed during World War I.

== See also ==
- List of Olympians killed in World War I
