= Beuthener SuSV 09 =

German football club

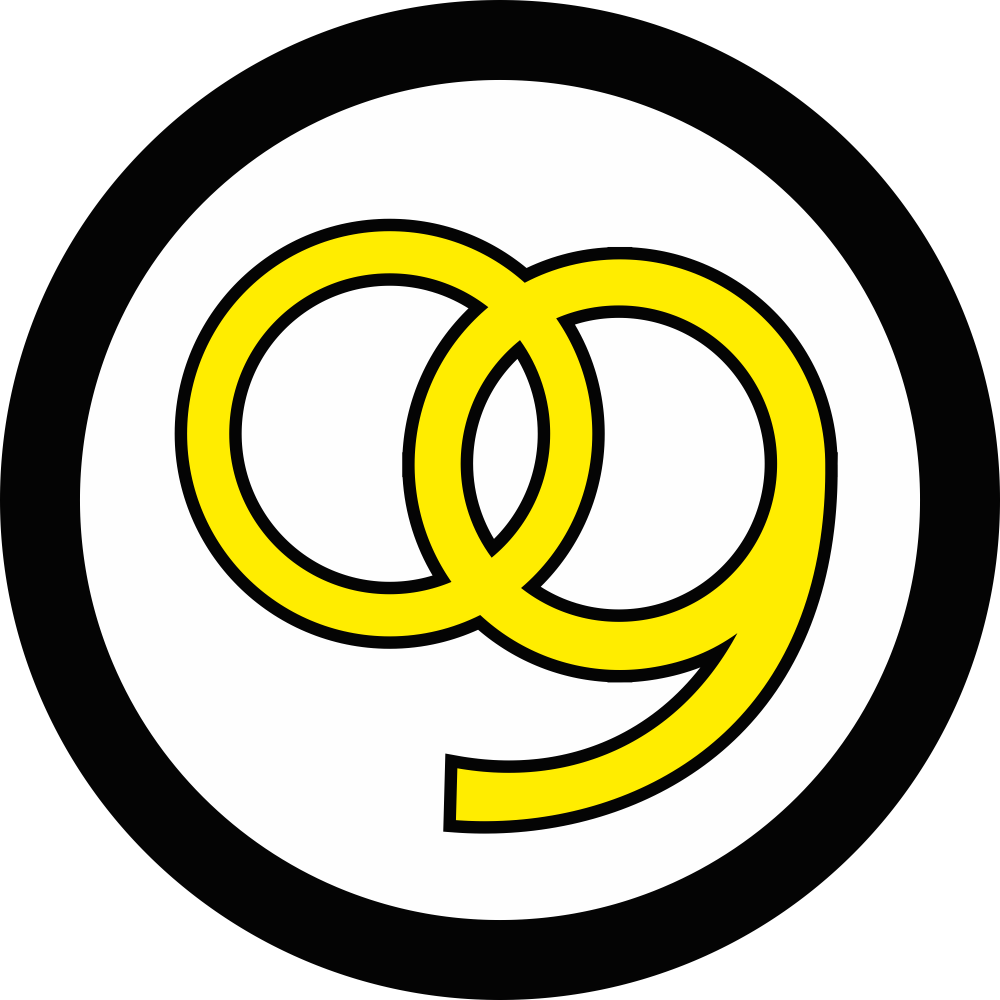
- Full name: Beuthener Spiel- und Sport-Verein 1909 e.V.
- Founded: 1909
- Dissolved: 1945
- Ground: various
Home colours	Away colours

Beuthener SuSV 09 was a German association football club from the city of Beuthen, Upper Silesia in what was then part of Germany but is today Bytom, Poland.

== History ==
The club was established on 15 June 1909 as Sport-Verein Britannia Beuthen and sometime in 1911 changed its name to Beuthener Spiel- und Sport-Verein. Playing in the regional Südost league the team made several appearances in qualification round play for the national level playoffs in the 1910s and 1920s, and won a string of four consecutive Südostdeutschland championships beginning in 1930. That season they also finally broke onto the national stage after four earlier failed attempts, only to be put out in an eighth-final match versus Hertha Berlin (3:2).

In each of their championship seasons SuSV advanced to the national level playoffs. They were put out in eighth-final matches in both 1931 and 1932 (0:2 to Hamburger SV and 1:5 to Polizei SV Chemnitz), with their best result coming in 1933 when they defeated SV Prussia-Samland Königsberg 7:1 before bowing to Munich 1860 0:3 in the quarterfinals.

In 1933, German football was re-organized under the Third Reich into sixteen top-flight regional divisions and the Beuthener side qualified to play in the Gauliga Schlesien. They captured divisional titles there in 1934 and 1937, but were unable to advance out of group play to return to the national stage. A poor finish in 1938 sent the club down for a season before they came back to what had become the Gauliga Oberschlesien where they would play until the end of World War II as a lower table side.

During this period SuSV qualified to take part in the Tschamerpokal tournament, predecessor to today's DFB-Pokal (German Cup), for three consecutive seasons from 1936 to 1938, where they were put out in the early going each time.

Following the war, the territory of Upper Silesia became part of Poland and the Beuthener side disappeared from the scene.

== Honours ==
- South Eastern German champions: 1930, 1931, 1932, 1933
- Gauliga Schlesien (I) champions: 1934, 1937

== Stadium ==
SuSV played in several different stadiums through the course of their nearly four decades long existence. The club wandered between three different sites between 1909 and 1914 before first settling into And der Hohenzollerngrube until 1918. Between 1918 and 1939 they played in An der Heinitzgrube. During the war from 1939 to 1945 they again used several different facilitities, playing in Beuthener Stadion, BBC Platz, or Giesche-Kampfbahn.

== Notable players ==
- Richard Malik, twice capped for the national side in 1932–33
