= Viktoria (trophy) =

German association football trophy

The Viktoria, formerly spelled Victoria, is a German association football trophy which was awarded to the German champions from 1903 to 1944. It is modelled on Victoria, the Roman goddess of victory, winged and flinging a wreath. Thus it is the smaller reproduction of a life size sculpture to be found in Berlin's Old National Gallery.

== History ==
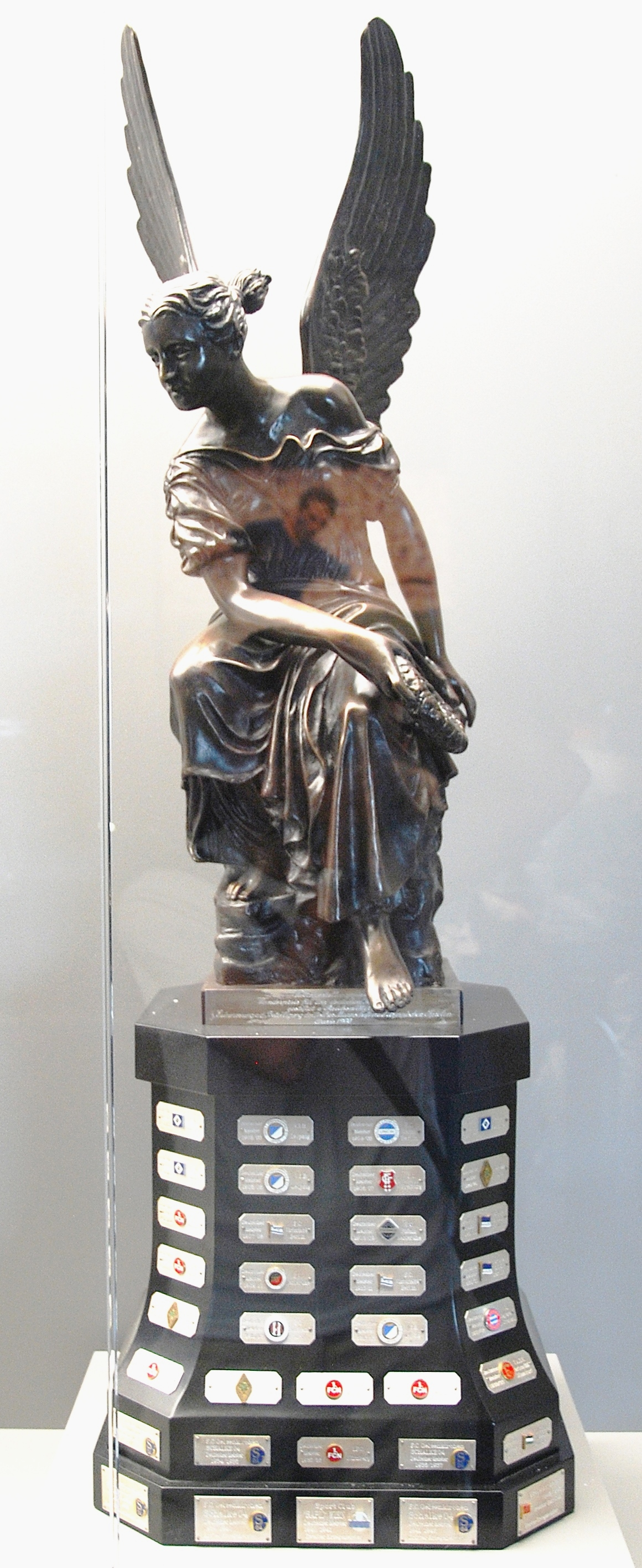
Replica of the Viktoria at the FC Schalke 04 museum

The Victoria was awarded to the German Football Association, the DFB, in 1900 to commemorate Germany's participation in the 1900 Summer Olympics which were held alongside the 1900 World Fair in Paris.

Originally it was meant as a trophy for both the German association football and rugby union champions but it was first awarded to the inaugural German football champions VfB Leipzig on 31 May 1903. After 1903 it was annually given to the German champions except during the First World War when the competition was halted. The last club to receive the trophy was Dresdner SC in 1944 after which it went missing in the final stages of the Second World War.

In post-Second World War Germany a new trophy had to be commissioned to replace the missing Victoria, the Meisterschale, when the German championship resumed in 1948, which was available from 1949 onwards. The trophy resurfaced after the German reunification, with its whereabouts in the time between remaining obscured, with theories ranging from the trophy being kept by the East German government to it being hidden in a cellar in East Berlin, and was kept at the DFB headquarters in Frankfurt until it was relocated to the new German football museum in Dortmund in 2015.
