= 1937–38 Eintracht Frankfurt season =

Eintracht Frankfurt
1937–38 season
- Chairman: Hans Söhngen
- Manager: Paul Oßwald
- Gauliga Südwest/Mainhessen: 1st / Champions
- German Championship round: 2nd / Runners-Up
- Tschammerpokal: 1st Round
- Top goalscorer: League: Albert Wirsching (25); All: Albert Wirsching (30)
- Highest home attendance: 18,000 3 October 1937 v FSV Frankfurt (league)
- Lowest home attendance: 2,000 30 January 1938 v 1. FC Kaiserslautern (league)

The 1937–38 Eintracht Frankfurt season was the 38th season in the club's football history.

In 1937–38 the club played in the Gauliga Südwest/Mainhessen, the top tier of German football. It was the club's 5th season in the Gauliga Südwest/Mainhessen. The season ended up with Eintracht finishing as champions in the Gauliga Südwest/Mainhessen. In the German Championship round finished as runners-up.

== Matches ==
=== Legend ===
Win Draw Loss Postponed

=== Friendlies ===
15 August 1937	Schwaben Augsburg (Germany)	3–4	(Germany) Eintracht Frankfurt	Germany
	Goal	Report	Goal

22 August 1937	Schweinfurt 05 (Germany)	2–4	(Germany) Eintracht Frankfurt	Schweinfurt, Germany
	Goal	Report	Goal	Attendance: 5,000

5 September 1937 Inauguration match for the new Riederwaldstadion stand	Eintracht Frankfurt (Germany)	1–5	(Germany) Fortuna Düsseldorf	Frankfurt, Germany
	Arheilger 50'	Report	Schubart 5'; Zwolanowski; Kobierski	Stadium: Riederwaldstadion; Attendance: 10,000

10 October 1937	SpVgg Leipzig (Germany)	4–6	(Germany) Eintracht Frankfurt	Leipzig, Germany
	Klus	Report	Goal

14 November 1937	Eintracht Braunschweig (Germany)	3–2	(Germany) Eintracht Frankfurt	Germany
	Ender	Report	A Schmitt 60'	Referee: Meyer

21 November 1937	SpVgg Fürth (Germany)	3–3	(Germany) Eintracht Frankfurt	Fürth, Germany
	Fiederer 14', 88'; Popp 76'	Report	Feix 13' (o.g.); Wirsching 21', 78'	Stadium: Sportpark Ronhof; Attendance: 4,000; Referee: Reichel

28 November 1937	FSV Frankfurt (Germany)	0–2	(Germany) Eintracht Frankfurt	Germany
		Report	Arheilger; Ehmer

5 December 1937	SA-Gruppe Westmark (Germany)	3–7	(Germany) Eintracht Frankfurt	Koblenz, Germany
	Goal	Report	A Schmitt; Wirsching; Arheilger; Linken

6 March 1938	Eintracht Frankfurt (Germany)	6–0	(Germany) BSG IG Farben	Frankfurt, Germany
	Ehmer 19', 57'; Arheilger 29'; Möbs 47'; S Hemmerich	Report		Stadium: Riederwaldstadion

7 April 1938	Eintracht Frankfurt (Germany)	3–1	(Germany) Union Niederrad	Frankfurt, Germany
	Möbs 75'; Röll	Report	Seibert 40' (pen.)	Stadium: Riederwaldstadion; Attendance: 1,500

17 April 1938	Berliner SV 92 (Germany)	4–0	(Germany) Eintracht Frankfurt	Berlin, Germany
	Ballendat; Hewerer; Kurzke	Report		Stadium: Poststadion; Attendance: 8,000

18 April 1938	Hertha BSC (Germany)	4–5	(Germany) Eintracht Frankfurt	Berlin, Germany
	Schulz 6'; Dreher; Schneider	Report	A Schmitt 20', 35'; Wirsching; Linken	Stadium: Sportplatz am Gesundbrunnen; Attendance: 8,000

19 June 1938	Eintracht Frankfurt (Germany)	2–1	(Germany) 1. FC Pforzheim	Frankfurt, Germany
	Wirsching; Arheilger	Report	Wenz 83'	Stadium: Riederwaldstadion; Attendance: 1,000

4 June 1938	Eintracht Frankfurt (Germany)	2–2	(Germany) Hertha BSC	Frankfurt, Germany
	A Schmitt; Wirsching	Report	Schulze; Wilhelm	Stadium: Riederwaldstadion; Attendance: 2,000

12 June 1938	Hannover 96 (Germany)	4–1	(Germany) Eintracht Frankfurt	Hanover, Germany
	Meng; Malecki	Report	A Schmitt pen.'

19 June 1938	1. FC Pforzheim (Germany)	4–1	(Germany) Eintracht Frankfurt	Pforzheim, Germany
	Rau 35' (pen.); Ehmer o.g.'; Fischer	Report	Wirsching

=== Gauliga Südwest/Mainhessen ===
==== League fixtures and results ====
12 September 1937 1	FK Pirmasens	1–2	Eintracht Frankfurt	Pirmasens, Germany
	Wagner 16'	Report	A Schmitt pen.'; S Hemmerich 76'	Referee: Dinger

19 September 1937 2	Eintracht Frankfurt	1–0	Kickers Offenbach	Germany
	Wirsching 84'	Report		Attendance: 4,000; Referee: Becker

26 September 1937 3	Opel Rüsselsheim	0–4	Eintracht Frankfurt	Rüsselsheim, Germany
		Report	Wirsching; A Schmitt; Röll	Attendance: 3,000; Referee: Walter

3 October 1937 4	Eintracht Frankfurt	2–2	FSV Frankfurt	Frankfurt, Germany
	Wirsching 11', 35'	Report	Schuchardt 35'; Armbruster 84' (pen.)	Stadium: Riederwaldstadion; Attendance: 18,000; Referee: Hermann

17 October 1937 5	Eintracht Frankfurt	4–0	Wormatia Worms	Frankfurt, Germany
	Wirsching; Heyl	Report		Stadium: Riederwaldstadion; Attendance: 10,000; Referee: Unversehrt

24 October 1937 6	SV Wiesbaden	0–1	Eintracht Frankfurt	Wiesbaden, Germany
		Report	Wirsching 60'	Attendance: 5,000; Referee: Welsch

7 November 1937 7	Eintracht Frankfurt	1–1	Borussia Neunkirchen	Frankfurt, Germany
	Wirsching 51'	Report	Fuhrmann 11'	Stadium: Riederwaldstadion; Attendance: 12,000; Referee: Heß

12 December 1937 8	Eintracht Frankfurt	5–3	FV Saarbrücken	Frankfurt, Germany
	Arheilger; Linken; A Schmitt; Röll; Wirsching	Report	Resch; Sold pen.'	Stadium: Riederwaldstadion; Attendance: 3,500; Referee: Unverfehrt

19 December 1937 9	Eintracht Frankfurt	3–0	FK Pirmasens	Frankfurt, Germany
	Arheilger; Wirsching	Report		Stadium: Riederwaldstadion; Attendance: 3,000; Referee: Bühler

26 December 1937 10	1. FC Kaiserslautern	1–3	Eintracht Frankfurt	Kaiserslautern, Germany
	Brill	Report	Arheilger 5'; Wirsching; Gramlich	Stadium: Betzenberg; Attendance: 8,000; Referee: Becker

2 January 1938 11	Kickers Offenbach	4–2	Eintracht Frankfurt	Bieber, Germany
	Staab 60', 69', 80'; Simon 87'	Report	Röll 16'; A Schmitt 41'	Stadium: Stadion am Bieberer Berg; Attendance: 12,000; Referee: Heß

16 January 1938 12	FSV Frankfurt	2–6	Eintracht Frankfurt	Frankfurt, Germany
	Schuchardt 12'; Armbruster (red card); Heldmann	Report	Röll 88'; Wirsching 65', 78'; Arheilger 79', 81'	Stadium: Stadion am Bornheimer Hang; Attendance: 17,000; Referee: Flächsenhar

30 January 1938 13	Eintracht Frankfurt	7–1	1. FC Kaiserslautern	Frankfurt, Germany
	Wirsching 14' 77'; Linken 29'; Röll; A Schmitt 82' (pen.); Arheilger 89'	Report	Maier 40'	Stadium: Riederwaldstadion; Attendance: 2,000; Referee: Walter

6 February 1938 14	Wormatia Worms	2–0	Eintracht Frankfurt	Worms, Germany
	Eckert 35'; Busam 61'	Report		Stadium: Wormatia-Stadion; Attendance: 7,000; Referee: Weingärtner

13 February 1938 15	Eintracht Frankfurt	5–2	SV Wiesbaden	Frankfurt, Germany
	Arheilger; Röll 84'; Wirsching 47'	Report	Schulmeyer 39'; Fuchs pen.'	Stadium: Riederwaldstadion; Attendance: 3,500; Referee: Best

13 March 1938 16	Eintracht Frankfurt	8–1	Opel Rüsselsheim	Frankfurt, Germany
	Röll 4' 42'; Linken 10'; Wirsching 35' 62'; Arheilger	Report	Herberich	Stadium: Riederwaldstadion; Attendance: 4,000; Referee: Multer

20 March 1938 17	Borussia Neunkirchen	3–0	Eintracht Frankfurt	Neunkirchen, Germany
	Petri 40'; Kiefer 52'; Leibenguth 61'	Report		Stadium: Ellenfeld; Attendance: 12,000; Referee: Groß

27 March 1938 18	FV Saarbrücken	2–4	Eintracht Frankfurt	Saarbrücken, Germany
	Benzmüller 4', 63'	Report	Wirsching 31', 88'; Linken 41', 83'	Stadium: Ludwigsparkstadion; Attendance: 8,000; Referee: Hermann

==== League table ====
Pos	Team	Pld	W	D	L	GF	GA	GD	Pts	Promotion, qualification or relegation
1	Eintracht Frankfurt	18	13	2	3	58	25	+33	28	Qualification to Qualifier to the championship
2	Borussia Neunkirchen	18	11	5	2	40	19	+21	27	
3	Wormatia Worms	18	9	4	5	41	32	+9	22	
4	Kickers Offenbach	18	8	5	5	47	27	+20	21	
5	FSV Frankfurt	18	7	3	8	33	33	0	17	
6	FK Pirmasens	18	6	4	8	27	28	−1	16	
7	SV Wiesbaden	18	6	4	8	30	37	−7	16	
8	FV Saarbrücken	18	5	2	11	33	48	−15	12	
9	1. FC Kaiserslautern	18	3	6	9	24	49	−25	12	Relegation to the second tier
10	Opel Rüsselsheim	18	2	5	11	16	51	−35	9	Relegation to the second tier

Source: RSSSF.com
Rules for classification: 1) Points

==== Results summary ====
Overall								Home						Away					
Pld	W	D	L	GF	GA	GD	Pts	W	D	L	GF	GA	GD	W	D	L	GF	GA	GD
18	13	2	3	58	25	+33	28	7	2	0	36	10	+26	6	0	3	22	15	+7

Source: Bundesliga

==== Results by round ====
Round	1	2	3	4	5	6	7	8	9	10	11	12	13	14	15	16	17	18
Ground	A	H	A	H	H	A	H	H	H	A	A	A	H	A	H	H	A	A
Result	W	W	W	D	W	W	D	W	W	W	L	W	W	L	W	W	L	W
Position	3	3	1	2	2	1	1	2	1	1	1	1	1	1	1	1	2	1

A = Away; H = Home; W = Win; D = Draw; L = Loss

=== German championship round (Group 1) ===
Pos	Team	Pld	W	D	L	GF	GA	GR	Pts	Qualification	HSV	SGE	SSC	YBI
1	Hamburger SV	6	5	0	1	21	5	4.200	10	Advance to semi-finals	—	5–0	2–0	3–1
2	Eintracht Frankfurt	6	5	0	1	24	13	1.846	10		3–2	—	5–0	5–0
3	Stettiner SC	6	2	0	4	12	18	0.667	4		1–3	5–6	—	1–0
4	Yorck Boyen Insterburg	6	0	0	6	4	25	0.160	0		0–6	1–5	2–5	—

Source: RSSSF
Rules for classification: 1) Points; 2) Goal ratio.

3 April 1938 1	Yorck Boyen Insterburg	1–5	Eintracht Frankfurt	Insterburg, Germany
	Schulz 29'	Report	A Schmitt 17', 47', 50'; Wirsching 36'; Groß 75'	Attendance: 3,000; Referee: Peters

15 April 1938 2	Stettiner SC	5–6	Eintracht Frankfurt	Stettin, Germany
	Bonsack 27'; Schmoll 50'; Palinski 65', 73'; Liedtke 67'	Report	A Schmitt 7', 62'; Röll 43', 56'; Wirsching 54'; Linken 60'	Attendance: 6,000; Referee: Jaehnichen

24 April 1938 3	Hamburger SV	5–0	Eintracht Frankfurt	Hamburg, Germany
	Carstens 10', 41'; F Dörfel 36'; Noack 47'; Höffmann	Report		Stadium: Stadion Hoheluft; Attendance: 25,000; Referee: Broden

30 April 1938 4	Eintracht Frankfurt	5–0	Stettiner SC	Frankfurt, Germany
	A Schmitt 12', 71' (pen.); Röll 47', 69'; Arheilger 75'	Report		Stadium: Riederwaldstadion; Attendance: 4,000; Referee: Pfeiffer

8 May 1938 5	Eintracht Frankfurt	5–0	Yorck Boyen Insterburg	Frankfurt, Germany
	Möbs 29'; Linken; Arheilger 36'; Wirsching 49', 61'	Report		Attendance: 4,000; Referee: Markert

22 May 1938 6	Eintracht Frankfurt	3–2	Hamburger SV	Frankfurt, Germany
	Röll 4'; Wirsching 69'; A Schmitt 85'	Report	Carstens 16'; Höffmann 66'	Stadium: Waldstadion; Attendance: 10,000; Referee: Stöckmann

=== Tschammerpokal ===
29 August 1937 1st Round	SpVgg Sülz 07	2–0	Eintracht Frankfurt	Cologne, Germany
	Siegfried 4'; Schmaus 21'	Report		Stadium: Müngersdorfer Stadion; Attendance: 2,000; Referee: Schwarz

== Squad ==
=== Squad and statistics ===
No.	Pos	Nat	Player	Total		Gauliga		German Championship round		Cup	
No.	Pos	Nat	Player	Apps	Goals	Apps	Goals	Apps	Goals	Apps	Goals
	GK	(Nazi Germany) [[|Germany]]	Fritz Gorka	7	0	7	0	0	0	0	0
	GK		Alois Peutler	15	0	11	0	4	0	0	0
	GK	(Nazi Germany) [[|Germany]]	Ludwig Schmitt	3	0	0	0	2	0	1	0
	DF	(Nazi Germany) [[|Germany]]	Karl Ehmer	9	1	7	0	1	1	1	0
	DF	(Nazi Germany) [[|Germany]]	Friedrich Groß	21	1	14	0	6	1	1	0
	DF	(Nazi Germany) [[|Germany]]	Hans Stubb	19	0	15	0	4	0	0	0
	MF	(Nazi Germany) [[|Germany]]	Karl Becker	1	0	0	0	1	0	0	0
	MF	(Nazi Germany) [[|Germany]]	Gottfried Fürbeth	21	0	18	0	2	0	1	0
	MF	(Nazi Germany) [[|Germany]]	Rudolf Gramlich	22	1	17	1	4	0	1	0
	MF	(Nazi Germany) [[|Germany]]	Hermann Lindemann	24	0	18	0	6	0	0	0
	MF	(Nazi Germany) [[|Germany]]	Walter Zipp	3	0	0	0	3	0	0	0
	FW		Emil Arheilger	17	14	11	11	6	3	0	0
	FW		Willi Grein	6	0	5	0	0	0	1	0
	FW	(Nazi Germany) [[|Germany]]	Anton Hemmerich	1	0	0	0	0	0	1	0
	FW	(Nazi Germany) [[|Germany]]	Stefan Hemmerich	6	1	5	1	0	0	1	0
	FW	(Nazi Germany) [[|Germany]]	Georg Heyl	5	1	4	1	0	0	1	0
	FW		Franz Knapp	1	0	1	0	0	0	0	0
	FW	(Nazi Germany) [[|Germany]]	Fritz Linken	17	4	11	3	6	1	0	0
	FW	(Nazi Germany) [[|Germany]]	August Möbs	6	1	1	0	5	1	0	0
	FW	(Nazi Germany) [[|Germany]]	Karl Röll	22	16	17	11	5	5	0	0
	FW	(Nazi Germany) [[|Germany]]	Adam Schmitt	24	12	18	5	5	7	1	0
	FW	(Nazi Germany) [[|Germany]]	Albert Wirsching	25	30	18	25	6	5	1	0

=== Transfers ===
In:

No.	Pos.	Nation	Player
—	FW		Emil Arheilger (from Darmstadt)
—	MF	(Nazi Germany) [[|Germany]]	Karl Becker (from Eintracht Frankfurt reserves)
—	FW	(Nazi Germany) [[|Germany]]	Fritz Linken (from unknown)
—	GK	(Nazi Germany) [[|Germany]]	Alois Peutler (from unknown)

Out:

No.	Pos.	Nation	Player
—	FW		Bisswurm (to unknown)
—	FW		Walter Mechling (to unknown)
—	MF		Paul Hermann (to Swabia)
—	FW	(Nazi Germany) [[|Germany]]	Karl Lanz (to SV 1920 Groß-Karben)
—	FW	(Nazi Germany) [[|Germany]]	Karl Monz (to unknown)

== See also ==
- 1938 German football championship

== Sources ==
- Matheja, Ulrich (2011). Unsere Eintracht - Eintracht Frankfurt - Die Chronik. Die Werkstatt. ISBN 978-3-89533-750-5.
