= 1950 German football championship =

1950 German championship
Deutsche Fußballmeisterschaft

Tournament details
- Country: West Germany
- Dates: 21 May – 25 June
- Teams: 16

Final positions
- Champions: VfB Stuttgart; 1st German title
- Runners-up: Kickers Offenbach

Tournament statistics
- Matches played: 17
- Goals scored: 66 (3.88 per match)
- Top goal scorer: Herbert Wojtkowiak (5 goals)

The 1950 German football championship, the 40th edition of the competition, was the culmination of the 1949–50 football season in Germany. VfB Stuttgart won their first championship in a one-leg knock-out tournament. It was the third championship after the end of World War II.

VfB Stuttgart appeared in their second final, having lost to Schalke 04 in 1935. Losing finalists Kickers Offenbach appeared in a championship final for the first time.

For the first time 16 teams competed for the title, including the runners-up of the Berlin championship. However, East German side Union Oberschöneweide did not receive a travel permit, like SG Planitz two years earlier. Their players nevertheless traveled to Kiel to play Hamburger SV and eventually founded SC Union 06 Berlin. Originally, the first three teams from the DDR-Oberliga had been slated to appear in the championship, but the two football associations eventually could not agree on a mode of play and their places were given to West German Oberliga sides.

== Qualified teams ==
The clubs qualified through the 1949–50 Oberliga season:

Club	Qualified from
Hamburger SV	Oberliga Nord champions
FC St. Pauli	Oberliga Nord runners-up
VfL Osnabrück	Oberliga Nord 3rd place
Borussia Dortmund	Oberliga West champions
Preußen Dellbrück	Oberliga West runners-up
Rot-Weiss Essen	Oberliga West 3rd place
STV Horst-Emscher	Oberliga West 4th place
1. FC Kaiserslautern	Oberliga Südwest champions
SSV Reutlingen 05	Oberliga Südwest runners-up
TuS Koblenz	Oberliga Südwest 3rd place
SpVgg Fürth	Oberliga Süd champions
VfB Stuttgart	Oberliga Süd runners-up
Kickers Offenbach	Oberliga Süd 3rd place
VfR Mannheim	Oberliga Süd 4th place
Tennis Borussia Berlin	Stadtliga Berlin champions
Union Oberschöneweide	Stadtliga Berlin runners-up

== Competition ==
=== Round of 16 ===
21 May 1950	1. FC Kaiserslautern	2 – 2 a.e.t.	Rot-Weiss Essen	Karlsruhe
	F.Walter 43', 70'		Abromeit 20'; Termath 87'	Stadium: Mühlburger Stadion; Attendance: 20,000; Referee: Heuck (Kiel)

21 May 1950	SpVgg Fürth	3 – 2	STV Horst-Emscher	Worms
	Schade 43'; Hoffmann 62', 85'		Klodt 17'; Zielinski 29'	Stadium: Wormatia-Stadion; Attendance: 25,000; Referee: Rannersmann (Bremen)

21 May 1950	Preußen Dellbrück	1 – 0 a.e.t.	SSV Reutlingen	Koblenz
	Severin 113'			Stadium: Stadion Oberwerth; Attendance: 20,000; Referee: Szymalek (Berlin)

21 May 1950	Borussia Dortmund	1 – 3	VfR Mannheim	Gladbeck
	Kasperski 32'		de la Vigne 41', 70'; Löttke 64'	Stadium: Stadion Gladbeck; Attendance: 38,000; Referee: Burmeister (Hamburg)

21 May 1950	VfB Stuttgart	2 – 1	VfL Osnabrück	Cologne
	Guhre 35' (o.g.); Baitinger 83'		Vetter 5'	Stadium: Müngersdorfer Stadion; Attendance: 25,000; Referee: Rosenkranz (Gelsenkirchen)

21 May 1950	Kickers Offenbach	3 – 1	TeBe Berlin	Munich
	Kaufhold 19', 51'; Buhtz 63'		Berndt 83'	Attendance: 15,000; Referee: Berndt (Düsseldorf)

21 May 1950	FC St. Pauli	4 – 0	TuS Neuendorf	Hanover
	Kruppa 22', 85'; Sump 54'; Beck 80'			Stadium: Stadion der Hauptstadt Hannover; Attendance: 15,000; Referee: Ruhmann (Regensburg)

28 May 1950	Hamburger SV	7 – 0	Union 06 Berlin	Kiel
	Woitkowiak 1', 47', 60', 72'; Rohrberg 18'; Adamkiewicz 29', 31'			Stadium: VfB-Platz; Attendance: 12,000; Referee: Fink (Frankfurt)

==== Replay ====
29 May 1950	1. FC Kaiserslautern	3 – 2 a.e.t.	Rot-Weiss Essen	Cologne
	Baßler 55'; F.Walter 70'; O.Walter 116'		Kleina 31'; Termath 36'	Stadium: Müngersdorfer Stadion; Attendance: 45,000; Referee: Gabriel (Hanover)

=== Quarter-finals ===
4 June 1950

VfB Stuttgart	5 – 2	1. FC Kaiserslautern
Schlienz 14'; Bühler 42'; Läpple 52'; Blessing 75'; Baitinger 78'		O.Walter 50', 83'

Club-Stadion im Zabo, Nuremberg
Attendance: 38,000
Referee: Hamm (Eschweiler)

4 June 1950

SpVgg Fürth	2 – 1	FC St. Pauli
Brenzke 36' (pen.); Nöth 45'		Zimmermann 48'

Glückauf-Kampfbahn, Gelsenkirchen
Attendance: 20,000
Referee: Hoppe (Berlin)

4 June 1950

Kickers Offenbach	3 – 2	Hamburger SV
Buhtz 61'; Wirsching 81'; Weber 88'		Adamkiewicz 4'; Woitkowiak 6'

Rheinstadion, Düsseldorf
Attendance: 45,000
Referee: Witthaus (Duisburg)

4 June 1950

Preußen Dellbrück	2 – 1	VfR Mannheim
Severin 49'; Drost 75'		de la Vigne 63'

Waldstadion, Frankfurt
Attendance: 40,000
Referee: Liebig (Berlin)

=== Semi-finals ===
11 June 1950

VfB Stuttgart	4 – 1	SpVgg Fürth
Bühler 34', 57'; Blessing 39'; Läpple 75'		Schade 11'

Waldstadion, Frankfurt
Attendance: 60,000
Referee: Schmetzer

11 June 1950

Preußen Dellbrück	0 – 0	Kickers Offenbach

Neckarstadion, Stuttgart
Attendance: 25,000
Referee: Burmeister (Hamburg)

==== Replay ====
18 June 1950

Preußen Dellbrück	0 – 3	Kickers Offenbach
		Kaufhold 1'; Baas 73'; Weber 74'

Niederrheinstadion, Oberhausen
Attendance: 45,000
Referee: Heuck (Kiel)

=== Final ===
25 June 1950

VfB Stuttgart	2–1	Kickers Offenbach
Läpple 17'; Bühler 27'		Buhtz 47'

Olympiastadion, Berlin
Attendance: 95,051
Referee: (West Germany) E. Kormannshaus (Löhne)

VFB STUTTGART
GK	1	(West Germany) Otto Schmid (c)
RB	2	(West Germany) Erich Retter
CB	5	(West Germany) Josef Ledl
LB	3	(West Germany) Richard Steimle
RH	4	(West Germany) Ernst Otterbach
LH	6	(West Germany) Karl Barufka
OR	7	(West Germany) Erwin Läpple
IR	8	(West Germany) Robert Schlienz
CF	9	(West Germany) Walter Bühler
IL	10	(West Germany) Otto Baitinger
OL	11	(West Germany) Rolf Blessing
Manager:
(West Germany) Georg Wurzer

KICKERS OFFENBACH
GK	1	(West Germany) Josef Schepper
RB	2	(West Germany) Ferdinand Emberger
CB	5	(West Germany) Anton Picard (c)
LB	3	(West Germany) Willi Magel
RH	4	(West Germany) Kurt Schreiner
LH	6	(West Germany) Willi Keim
OR	7	(West Germany) Gerhard Kaufhold
IR	8	(West Germany) Albert Wirsching
CF	9	(West Germany) Horst Buhtz
IL	10	(West Germany) Wilhelm Weber
OL	11	(West Germany) Heinrich Baas
Manager:
(West Germany) Paul Oßwald
