= Albert Wirsching =

German footballer (1920–1997)

Personal information
- Date of birth: 1 September 1920
- Place of birth: Frankfurt, German Empire
- Date of death: 21 August 1997 (aged 76)
- Place of death: Bern, Switzerland
- Position: Forward

Youth career
- 1930–1936: Eintracht Frankfurt

Senior career*
Years	Team	Apps	(Gls)
1936–1948	Eintracht Frankfurt		
1948–1950	Kickers Offenbach		
1950–1952	FC Bern		
1952	TSV 1860 Munich		
1953–1955	FC Bern		
1955–1956	BSC Young Boys		
1956	FC Winterthur		
1957–1960	FC Langenthal		

Managerial career
- 1956: FC Winterthur (player-manager)
- 1957–1962: FC Langenthal (player-manager)
- 1962–1971: SC Sparta Bern
- SCI Esperia Napoli Berna
- BSC Young Boys
- * Club domestic league appearances and goals

Albert Wirsching (31 January 1920 – 21 August 1997) was a German footballer. He played club football with Eintracht Frankfurt, Kickers Offenbach, FC Bern, TSV 1860 Munich, BSC Young Boys and FC Winterthur.

== Career ==
Wirsching was part of the Eintracht Frankfurt squad that played from 1936 to 1941 in der Gauliga Südwest and later from 1941 to 1945 in the Gauliga Hessen-Nassau, one of the first tier Gauligas in Nazi Germany. In the 1938 campaign he won with Eintracht Frankfurt the Gauliga Südwest, admitting the Eagles to the German football championship group stage. He appeared in all six group matches scoring 7 goals which meant a runners-up position next to Hamburger SV. In the 1935 founded cup competition Tschammerpokal he competed from 1937 in four seasons, amounting seven games and two goals. His debut came on 29 August 1937 in a first round loss to SpVgg Sülz 07 in the Tschammerpokal.

After the end of World War II he played for Eintracht from 1945 until 1948 in the Oberliga Süd, back then the first German tier. During those years, goalkeeper Toni Turek, the 1954 World Cup winner and “football god”, was temporarily one of his teammates.

He moved to rivals Kickers Offenbach for the 1948–49, winning Oberliga Süd in his first season. In the next season he and his team finished as third. For Kickers Offenbach he competed in 1948–49 and in 1949–50 four final round matches for the German championship. The third place play-off on 9 July 1949 at Stadion Oberwerth in Koblenz was lost 2–1 after extra time to 1. FC Kaiserslautern, just like the final match in the next season against VfB Stuttgart that was lost with the same result on 25 June 1950 at Olympiastadion in Berlin.

After this loss he went to Switzerland, playing two seasons for FC Bern, firstly in the second tier Nationalliga B and after an immediate promotion in the Nationalliga A securing the league stay as twelfth out of 14 teams.

After Wirsching's return to Germany he signed in the 1952–53 season for TSV 1860 Munich that eventually finished as second to last and were relegated to the 2. Oberliga Süd. Once again he went to Switzerland and played there for three clubs.

Firstly he played in the 1953–54 campaign for Nationalliga A club BSC Young Boys, from 1954 to 1956 for Nationalliga B club FC Winterthur where he contributed to FCW's promotion to Nationalliga A. Albert Wirsching's last club before retirement was FC Langenthal.

== Honours ==
- Gauliga Südwest/Mainhessen
  - Champions: 1938
  - Runners-up: 1937
- Oberliga Süd
  - Champions: 1949
- German football championship
  - Runners-up: 1950

== Sources ==
- Matheja, Ulrich (2011). Unsere Eintracht - Eintracht Frankfurt - Die Chronik. Die Werkstatt. ISBN 978-3-89533-750-5.
- Werner Raupp: Toni Turek – „Fußballgott“. Eine Biographie. Arete Verlag, Hildesheim 2019, ISBN 978-3-96423-008-9, S. 54–58.
