= 1949 German football championship =

1949 German championship
Deutsche Fußballmeisterschaft

Tournament details
- Country: West Germany
- Dates: 29 May – 10 July
- Teams: 10

Final positions
- Champions: VfR Mannheim; 1st German title
- Runners-up: Borussia Dortmund
- Third place: 1. FC Kaiserslautern
- Fourth place: Kickers Offenbach

Tournament statistics
- Matches played: 14
- Goals scored: 48 (3.43 per match)
- Top goal scorer(s): Alfred Boller; Ernst Löttke (4 goals each)

The 1949 German football championship, the 39th edition of the German football championship, was the culmination of the 1948–49 football season in Germany. VfR Mannheim were crowned champions for the first time after a one-leg knock-out tournament. It was both sides' first appearance in the final.

The tournament was expanded so that ten teams were to take part in the final stage which was played as a one-leg knock-out tournament, with the matches played on neutral ground. The five regional Oberliga winners, along with VfR Mannheim and Wormatia Worms, automatically qualified for the quarter finals, while the remaining three teams played qualifying rounds to clinch the eighth place.

The 1949 championship was the first to see a new trophy for the champions awarded. The pre-Second World War trophy, the Viktoria, had disappeared during the final stages of the war and would not resurface until after the German reunification. The new trophy, the Meisterschale, was not ready for the 1948 season but was finished in time to be awarded to the 1949 champions.

== Qualified teams ==
The clubs qualified through the 1948–49 Oberliga season:

Club	Qualified from
Hamburger SV	Oberliga Nord champions
FC St. Pauli	Oberliga Nord runners-up
Borussia Dortmund	Oberliga West champions
Rot-Weiss Essen	Oberliga West runners-up
Berliner SV 92	Oberliga Berlin champions
1. FC Kaiserslautern	Oberliga Südwest champions
VfR Wormatia Worms	Oberliga Südwest runners-up
Kickers Offenbach	Oberliga Süd champions
VfR Mannheim	Oberliga Süd runners-up
FC Bayern Munich	Oberliga Süd third place

== Competition ==
=== First qualifying round ===
29 May 1949	FC St. Pauli	4 – 1	Rot-Weiss Essen	Braunschweig
	Boller 14', 54'; Stender 20'; Michael 87'		Cornelissen 83'	Stadium: Eintracht-Stadion; Attendance: 15,000; Referee: Boullion (Königsberg)

=== Second qualifying round ===
5 June 1949	FC St. Pauli	1 – 1 (a.e.t.)	Bayern Munich	Hanover
	Boller 49'		Resch 88'	Stadium: Eilenriedestadion; Attendance: 18,000; Referee: Schumann (Berlin)

==== Replay ====
6 June 1949	FC St. Pauli	2 – 0	Bayern Munich	Hanover
	Woitas 8'; Boller 66'			Stadium: Eilenriedestadion; Attendance: 18,000; Referee: Schumann (Berlin)

=== Quarter-finals ===
12 June 1949

Berliner SV 92	0 – 5	Borussia Dortmund
		Michallek 3', 77'; Erdmann 17'; Preißler 44'; Kasperski 83'

Olympiastadion, Berlin
Attendance: 50,000
Referee: Schulz (Dresden)

12 June 1949

1. FC Kaiserslautern	1 – 1 (a.e.t.)	FC St. Pauli
O.Walter 10'		Woitas 43'

Weserstadion, Bremen
Attendance: 35,000
Referee: Bernbeck (Frankfurt)

12 June 1949

Kickers Offenbach	2 – 2 (a.e.t.)	Wormatia Worms
Maier 71', 73'		Müller 35'; Vogt 90'

Betzenberg, Kaiserslautern
Attendance: 25,000
Referee: Heuck (Kiel)

12 June 1949

VfR Mannheim	5 – 0	Hamburger SV
de la Vigne 20'; Bolleyer 30'; Langlotz 79' (pen.), 90'; Löttke 84'

Waldstadion, Frankfurt
Attendance: 45,000
Referee: Trompetter (Cologne)

==== Replays ====
19 June 1949

1. FC Kaiserslautern	4 – 1	FC St. Pauli
O.Walter 8'; Baßler 15'; Grewenig 86', 90'		Appel 4'

Rheinstadion, Düsseldorf
Attendance: 50,000
Referee: Strobel (Schwabach)

19 June 1949

Kickers Offenbach	2 – 0	Wormatia Worms
Maier 12'; Selbert 70' (o.g.)

Telegrafenkaserne, Karlsruhe
Attendance: 35,000
Referee: Imbeck (Hamburg)

=== Semi-finals ===
26 June 1949

Borussia Dortmund	0 – 0 (a.e.t.)	1. FC Kaiserslautern

Grünwalder Stadion, Munich
Attendance: 60,000
Referee: Eberle (Stuttgart)

26 June 1949

VfR Mannheim	2 – 1	Kickers Offenbach
Löttke 1' de la Vigne 8'		Schreiner 3'

Glückauf-Kampfbahn, Gelsenkirchen
Attendance: 55,000
Referee: Kormannshaus (Bad Oeynhausen)

==== Replay ====
3 July 1949

Borussia Dortmund	4 – 1	1. FC Kaiserslautern
Preißler 22', 60'; Michallek 35'; Erdmann 85'		Baßler 50'

Müngersdorfer Stadion, Cologne
Attendance: 60,000
Referee: Fink (Frankfurt)

=== Third place play-off ===
9 July 1949

1. FC Kaiserslautern	2 – 1 (a.e.t.)	Kickers Offenbach
Grewenig 97'; O.Walter 109'		Schreiner 120'

Stadion Oberwerth, Koblenz
Attendance: 33,000
Referee: Witthaus (Duisburg)

=== Final ===
10 July 1949

VfR Mannheim	3–2 (a.e.t.)	Borussia Dortmund
Löttke 74' 108'; Langlotz 85'		Erdmann 5' 82'

Neckarstadion, Stuttgart
Attendance: 92,000
Referee: E. Zacher (Berlin)

VFR MANNHEIM:
GK	1	(West Germany) Hermann Jöckel
RB	2	(West Germany) Eugen Rößling
CB	5	(West Germany) Kurt Keuerleber
LB	3	(West Germany) Philip Henninger (c)
RH	4	(West Germany) Jakob Müller
LH	6	(West Germany) Rudi Maier
OR	7	(West Germany) Fritz Bolleyer
IR	8	(West Germany) Ernst Langlotz
CF	9	(West Germany) Ernst Löttke
IL	10	(West Germany) Kurt Stiefvater
OL	11	(West Germany) Rudolf de la Vigne
Manager:
(West Germany) Hans Schmidt

BORUSSIA DORTMUND:
GK	1	(West Germany) Günther Rau
RB	2	(West Germany) Heinrich Ruhmhofer
CB	5	(West Germany) Paul Koschmieder (c)
LB	3	(West Germany) Erwin Halfen
RH	4	(West Germany) Wilhelm Buddenberg
LH	6	(West Germany) Erich Schanko
OR	7	(West Germany) Werner Erdmann
IR	8	(West Germany) Max Michallek
CF	9	(West Germany) Edmund Kasperski
IL	10	(West Germany) Alfred Preißler
OL	11	(West Germany) Friedel Ibel
Manager:
(Austria) Eduard Havlicek
