= History of German football =

The history of German football is one that has seen many changes. Football was a popular game from early on, and the German sports landscape was dotted with hundreds of local sides. Local sports associations or clubs are a longtime feature of the culture of German athletics. Each club would participate in, and field teams from, one or more sports, depending on local interest and resources.

== Early history ==
Resident English merchants and industrialists brought football to the western Rhineland in the second half of the 19th century, alongside traditional equestrian sports.
Football came to Germany from the British Isles in 1873, ten years after the FA (The Football Association) was founded, and was initially played mainly by grammar school pupils. At that time, playing sport was a privilege of the upper classes, and in the gymnastics and sports clubs, sport was primarily understood to mean group exercises aimed at harmony and discipline. The competitive sport of football, which also emphasized the individual performance of an athlete, stood in stark contrast to these ideals; it was referred to as ‘loutishness’ or ‘English disease’ and its practice was initially banned almost everywhere in the clubs.

Konrad Koch, a progressive teacher of German and classical languages at the Martino-Katharineum grammar school in Braunschweig, was the first person to succeed in dispelling the reservations about football. In 1874 Koch and his colleague August Hermann organized what is believed to be the first-ever football match in Germany, between pupils from their school Martino-Katharineum. In 1875, Koch presented the first football rules for this new game in Germany and founded the first football club in Germany at his school in the same year. Until 1893, however, the rules were still based on the variant known today as Rugby football.

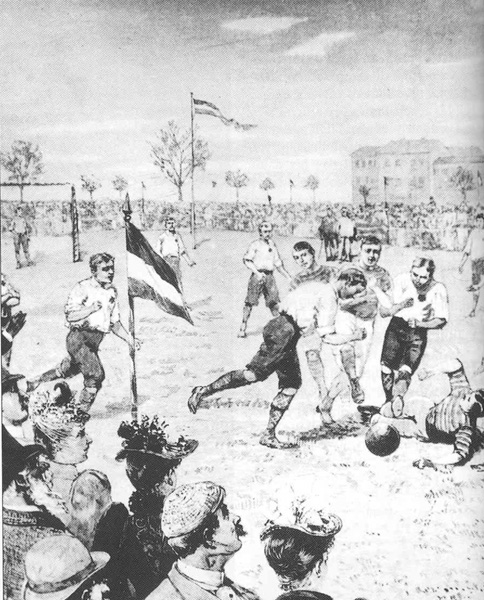
Ιllustration of a football match of 1892

According to a report in the Leipziger Zeitung in April 1874, Englishmen had founded a football club there, the Dresden English Football Club. They met regularly on Saturdays in front of the entrance to the Großer Garten, very close to today's Rudolf Harbig Stadium, and organised the game, which seemed strange to most spectators at the time. However, rugby was played in Dresden. This can be seen from an English source, which emphasizes that the Dresden Football Club was founded in October 1873 and played according to rugby rules. The oldest evidence of football in the modern sense (association football) comes from Lüneburg. There, teacher Wilhelm Goerges and Australian-born Richard Twopenny introduced the game at the Johanneum in August 1875. Several games are documented, the first of which was also reported in the Lüneburg advertisements in September 1875. However, the club founded at the Johanneum only existed for a short time and then fell into oblivion.

The number of footballers has grown steadily ever since. During the 1880s, the first clubs were founded in Berlin, Hamburg and Karlsruhe. Berlin was the center of German football at the time. BFC Germania 1888 from Berlin-Tempelhof was founded there in 1888. The "Bund Deutscher Fußballspieler" was also founded in Berlin in 1890 and the "Süddeutscher Fußball-Union" in 1893. The two associations almost merged at this time, but the Berliners demanded that Berlin become the permanent headquarters of the new association, which was rejected by the southern Germans.

Between 1898 and 1901, Walther Bensemann organized seven matches between German teams and French and English teams. As they were played before the establishment of the national sports association, they are not recognized as official international matches. It was not until 28 January 1900, with the inaugural meeting of the German Football Association in Leipzig, that a Germany-wide governing body was formed, with the regional associations gradually joining.

== First championships and international matches ==
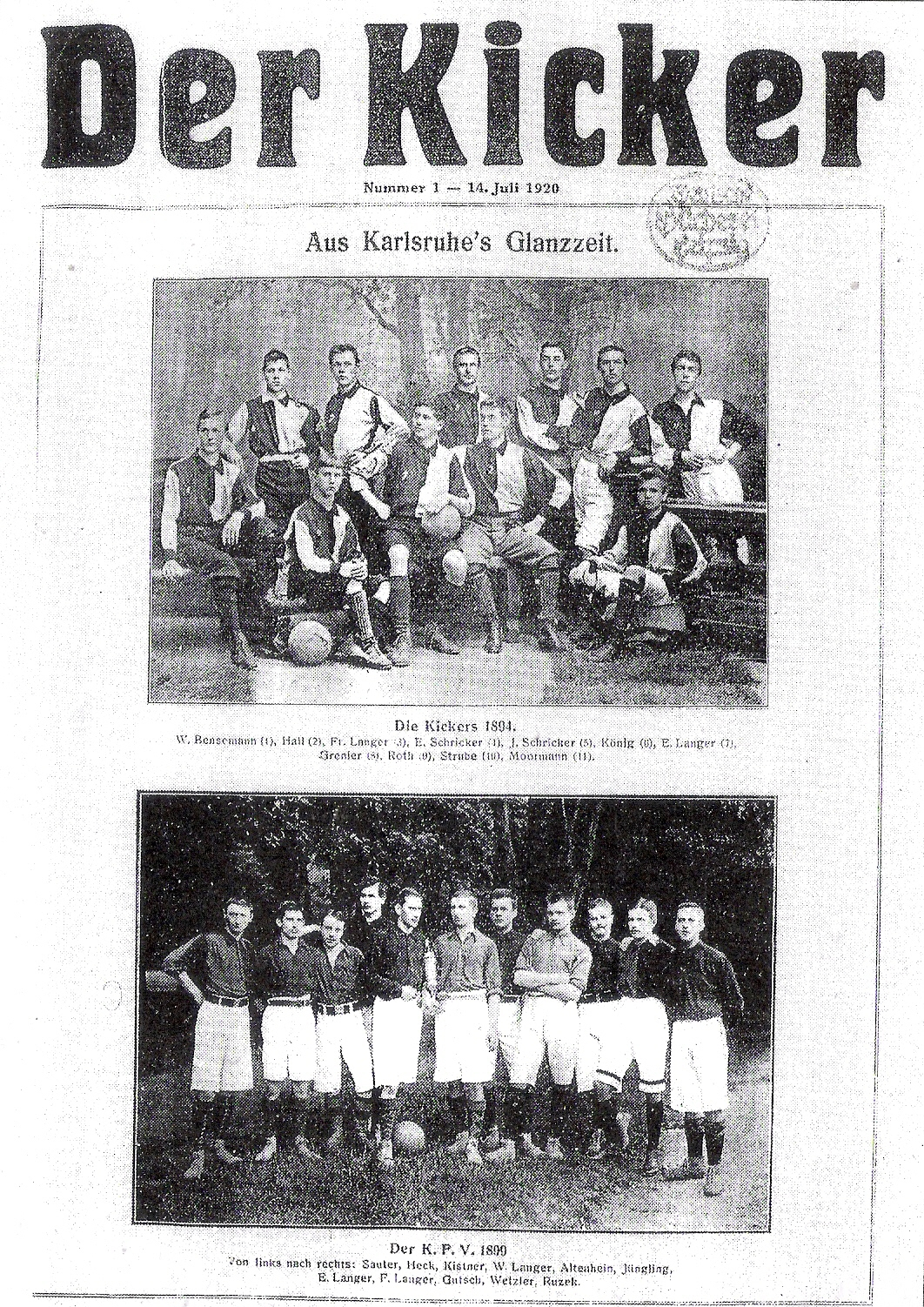
Ιssue of 14 July 1920 German football magazine Der Kicker

After the formation of the German Football Association, the first German championship final was held in 1903 and won by VfB Leipzig. VfB Leipzig and others such as Britannia Berlin, Karlsruher FV, Karlsruher FC Phönix, BFC Viktoria 1889, Duisburger SpV and Holstein Kiel were the first major teams to emerge. The nascent German association permitted teams from outside the country in their new championship, as long as they were members of one of its regional associations. This is how Prague, a team from Austria-Hungary, managed an appearance in the German national final. Once the DFB joined FIFA (Fédération Internationale de Football Association) in 1904, clubs from outside the country were no longer permitted to play in Germany.

From 1903 to 1944, teams played for the Viktoria (Victoria Championship Trophy). In 1908, a cup competition named Kronprinzenpokal for the regional representative XIs was started, the trophy having been donated by Crown Prince Wilhelm of Prussia. The Viktoria was originally intended to be awarded, on an annual alternating basis, to the championship teams of the DFB and the nation's rugby union teams; however, football became the more dominant sport, the Rugby clubs left the federation and the trophy stayed with the DFB. Championship play skipped a year in 1904, was interrupted by World War I between 1914 and 1918, and again at the end of World War II between 1944 and 1946. The last team to win the Viktoria was Dresdner SC, who beat the air-force club Luftwaffen SV Hamburg in Berlin's Olympiastadion 4–0 to end the 1943–44 competition. In the confusion at the end of World War II, the trophy disappeared. It was re-discovered decades later in an East German bank safe-deposit box where it had been placed by a Dresden supporter for safekeeping. It has since been returned to the DFB. In the meantime, a new championship trophy, the Meisterschale ("Championship Plate"), sometimes nicknamed "die Salatschüssel" (the salad bowl), was created in 1949.

The first official international match was played on 5 April 1908. They lost 5-3 to the Swiss national team in Basel. In the early years, the German national team was not very successful. Until the outbreak of the First World War in 1914, the DFB team played thirty matches, winning only six. One of those six matches was played at the 1912 Olympic Games in Stockholm - Germany beat Russia 16-0 on 1 July 1912, which remains the biggest victory for a German football team. Gottfried Fuchs scored a total of ten goals in the match - a world record that stood until 2001. The first international match after the war, against Switzerland again in Zurich on 27 June 1920, was lost 4-1.

Throughout the 1920s, the German national team continued to lose more often than it won. However, excellent football was already being played in German clubs. Franconia was a clear focus during this period, with 1. FC Nürnberg and SpVgg Fürth dominating the German topflight for almost a decade from 1920. Other successful clubs of the era included Hertha BSC and Hamburger SV, who also won several league titles and reached several finals.

In addition to the German Football Association (DFB), footballers were organized into associations, which also organized German football championships. The Arbeiter-Turn- und Sportbund (ATSB), for example, organized championships between 1919 and 1932. It even had its own national team, which played a total of 77 international matches. In 1928, the communist "Rot sport association", close to the KPD, broke away from the ATSB and organized its own championship from 1930. The bourgeois "German Gymnastics Association" also organized its own German championship between 1925 and 1930. The association then merged with the Reichssportbund, and the football teams with the DFB. There were also church associations that organized championships. The Deutsche Jugendkraft (DJK) was the sports association of the Catholic Church and organized championships on an irregular basis.

In 1919, there were 150,000 registered football players in Germany; by 1932, there were more than a million. In spite of the formation of a national association, German football held to an ideal of amateurism built around regional and local sports associations who felt that professionalism would diminish sportsmanship and local participation in the game. In the early 1930s, the DFB's president, Felix Linnemann, pushed for the creation of a professional league, or Reichsliga, in which the country's best teams would compete for the national championship. The idea was rebuffed by the regional federations dominating the sport.

== German football under the Third Reich ==
The reach of Germany's totalitarian Nazi regime stretched into social institutions at all levels, including their football leagues. Most sports and football associations were disbanded or replaced by Nazi-sponsored organisations. To join a DFB club, a player required recommendations from two non-Marxists to be permitted to play. The DFB gradually lost its independence as it was assimilated into the Deutscher Reichsausschuss für Leibesübungen (DRA) (Reich Committee for Physical Education).

Under Hans von Tschammer und Osten as Reichssportsführer, appointed by the Nazis, formerly independent sports organisations became departments of a new organisation which replaced the DRA — Deutscher Reichsbund für Leibesübungen (DRL, later NSRL or Nationalsozialistischer Reichsbund für Leibesübungen). As in most of German society at the time, sports associations and football teams took part in the purge of Jews from their organisations as ordered by the regime. A few clubs, such as Alemannia Aachen and Bayern Munich, moved to support or protect their members in the face of these actions.

Football was re-organised into sixteen Gaue (DRL sub-divisions) in the Gauliga, which was in place from 1933 to 1945. The overall effect of this was positive for German football. Prior to 1933, nearly 600 clubs competed in the top flight. League re-organisation reduced this to about 170 sides and significantly raised the level of competition. This was the beginning of a process of consolidation of the myriad of small regional leagues that would culminate in a stronger, unified national league structure. The German Cup was introduced in 1935. Known initially as the Tschammerpokal, after Hans von Tschammer, the first cup winner was 1. FC Nürnberg. Play for the Tschammerpokal went on until 1943 and was not resumed again until 1953, under its new name.

The pre-war period saw a number of German sides from Saarland, Danzig and the Memel Region playing in German league and cup competitions even though the Versailles Treaty had handed those regions over to the League of Nations after the end of World War I; football-wise, they had remained within the DFB (or DRL, respectively). In post-war times, 1. FC Saarbrücken (formerly FV Saarbrücken) played in the French Second Division for one season. They won that division handily but were denied promotion to the First Division. The Saarland was to be granted its own FIFA membership until it was re-united with Germany in 1956.

Twenty years back, FC Schalke 04 dominated German football during the Nazi era and was often held up for propaganda purposes as an example of the new Germany. As the Reich expanded through conquest, teams from Austria, Poland, Czechoslovakia, Alsace-Lorraine and Luxembourg were incorporated into the Gauliga. After the Anschluss, the forced union of Austria with Germany, Vienna's Rapid Wien captured the Tschammerpokal in 1938 and the German national championship in 1941, the latter with a 4–3 win over Schalke, who had been three goals ahead with just fifteen minutes to play in the game.

During the war, football was used as a morale booster for the population and was supported by the regime. Many teams were sponsored by the Luftwaffe, the SS, or other branches of the military. As the tide turned against Germany, the Gauliga began to crumble as players were called away to military service or were killed in the conflict, stadiums were bombed and travel became difficult. The original sixteen Gauligen broke up into over thirty smaller, more local circuits. The level of play deteriorated and lopsided scores became common, the record being a 32–0 win by Germania Mudersbach over FV Engen. The 1943–44 championship was initially cancelled but eventually went ahead after widespread protest. The 1944–45 season began less than two weeks later, rather than after the usual three-month summer break. The last recorded match in the Third Reich was on 23 April 1945 as Bayern Munich defeated 1860 Munich 3–2. Less than three weeks later, Germany surrendered unconditionally.

== Postwar football ==
Under Allied occupation all organizations, including sports clubs and associations, were initially banned. However, within a year, sports-only organizations without political affiliation were permitted, and in the American, British and French occupation zones, most pre-war clubs were reconstituted. Oberliga play resumed in 1945–46 on a regional basis in the South and South-West; Berlin and the other regions followed and, in 1948, 1. FC Nürnberg defeated 1. FC Kaiserslautern 2–1 to become the first post-war national champions. At the time, there was no "prize" to play for. The Viktoria trophy traditionally awarded to the nation's best side had gone missing in the chaos of post-war Germany. In 1949, Nürnberg and each winning side since VfB Leipzig in 1903, would have their names engraved on the newly created Meisterschale, nicknamed "the salad bowl" for its shape. The German Cup competition introduced prior to the war also returned, with Rot-Weiss Essen's 2–1 victory over Alemannia Aachen in 1953.

Through the 1950s, there were continued calls for the formation of a central professional league, especially as professional leagues in other countries began to draw Germany's best players away from the amateur domestic leagues. At the international level the German game began to falter as German teams often fared poorly against professional teams from other countries. A key supporter of the central league concept was national team head coach Sepp Herberger who said, "If we want to remain competitive internationally, we have to raise our expectations at the national level."

Logo of the Deutscher Fussball Verband der DDR (German Football Association of East Germany)

In spite of this, Germany (as West Germany) managed to win its first World Cup in 1954 defeating heavily favoured Hungary 3–2, the only "amateur" (i.e. semi-professional) side ever to do so. The unexpected victory was called "The Miracle of Bern" by a delighted nation. An oddity of the 1954 World Cup preliminary rounds was the fielding of a separate side by the German state of Saarland, which was occupied by the French and did not become a part of West Germany again until after a plebiscite and treaty negotiation. The Saarlanders acquitted themselves well, finishing second in their group ahead of Norway and behind group winner West Germany.

Meanwhile, in East Germany, a separate league was established with the formation of the DS-Oberliga (Deutscher Sportausschuß Oberliga or German Sports Association) in 1949. The league was renamed the Fußball Oberliga DFV in 1958 and was generally referred to simply as the DDR-Liga or DDR-Oberliga. The league fielded 14 teams with 2 relegation spots.

== The formation of the Bundesliga ==
The defeat of the national team by Yugoslavia (0–1) in a 1962 World Cup quarter final game in Chile was one impetus (of many) to the formation of a national league. Under new DFB president Hermann Gösmann (elected that very day) the Bundesliga was created in Dortmund at the Westfalenhallen on 28 July 1962 to begin play starting with the 1963–64 season. The new German professional league was modelled on the long-established English league, which had been set up in 1888.

At the time, there were five Oberligen, or Premier leagues, in place representing West Germany's North, South, West, Southwest, and Berlin. East Germany, under Soviet occupation, maintained its separate league structure. Forty-six clubs applied for admission to the new league. Sixteen teams were selected based on their success on the field, economic criteria and representation of the various Oberligen.

- From Oberliga Nord: Eintracht Braunschweig, SV Werder Bremen, Hamburger SV
- From Oberliga West: Borussia Dortmund, 1. FC Köln, Meidericher SV (now MSV Duisburg), SC Preußen Münster, FC Schalke 04
- From Oberliga Südwest: 1. FC Kaiserslautern, 1. FC Saarbrücken
- From Oberliga Süd: Eintracht Frankfurt, Karlsruher SC, 1. FC Nürnberg, TSV 1860 Munich, VfB Stuttgart
- From Oberliga Berlin: Hertha BSC Berlin

The first Bundesliga games were played on 24 August 1963. Early favorite 1. FC Köln (45:19) was the first Bundesliga champion over second place clubs Meidericher SV and Eintracht Frankfurt (both 39:25).

- Season: Bundesliga-Champion
1963–64	1. FC Köln
1964–65	SV Werder Bremen
1965–66	TSV 1860 Munich
1966–67	Eintracht Braunschweig
1967–68	1. FC Nürnberg
1968–69	FC Bayern Munich
1969–70	Borussia Mönchengladbach
1970–71	Borussia Mönchengladbach
1971–72	FC Bayern Munich
1972–73	FC Bayern Munich
1973–74	FC Bayern Munich
1974–75	Borussia Mönchengladbach
1975–76	Borussia Mönchengladbach
1976–77	Borussia Mönchengladbach
1977–78	1. FC Köln
1978–79	Hamburger SV
1979–80	FC Bayern Munich
1980–81	FC Bayern Munich
1981–82	Hamburger SV
1982–83	Hamburger SV
1983–84	VfB Stuttgart
1984–85	FC Bayern Munich
1985–86	FC Bayern Munich
1986–87	FC Bayern Munich
1987–88	SV Werder Bremen
1988–89	FC Bayern Munich
1989–90	FC Bayern Munich
1990–91	1. FC Kaiserslautern
1991–92	VfB Stuttgart
1992–93	SV Werder Bremen
1993–94	FC Bayern Munich
1994–95	Borussia Dortmund
1995–96	Borussia Dortmund
1996–97	FC Bayern Munich
1997–98	1. FC Kaiserslautern
1998–99	FC Bayern Munich
1999–00	FC Bayern Munich
2000–01	FC Bayern Munich
2001–02	Borussia Dortmund
2002–03	FC Bayern Munich
2003–04	SV Werder Bremen
2004–05	FC Bayern Munich
2005–06	FC Bayern Munich
2006–07	VfB Stuttgart
2007–08	FC Bayern Munich
2008–09	VfL Wolfsburg
2009–10	FC Bayern Munich
2010–11	Borussia Dortmund
2011–12	Borussia Dortmund
2012–13	FC Bayern Munich
2013–14	FC Bayern Munich
2014–15	FC Bayern Munich
2015–16	FC Bayern Munich
2016–17	FC Bayern Munich
2017–18	FC Bayern Munich
2017-2018	FC Bayern Munich
2019-2020	FC Bayern Munich
2020-2021	FC Bayern Munich
2021-2022	FC Bayern Munich
2022-2023	FC Bayern Munich
2023-2024	Bayer 04 Leverkusen
2024-2025	FC Bayern Munich

== The 1960s ==
The new league was met with enthusiasm early on and large crowds came out to watch the nation's top teams. No single team was able to dominate through the 1960s — in seven seasons from 1963 to 1964 through to 1969–70, seven different teams won the championship. The 1965–66 season saw the promotion of Bayern Munich to the top league and in 1968–69 they won their first championship on their way to becoming the most dominant side in Bundesliga history.

The 1960s also saw one of the strangest incidents in the history of the Bundesliga. The licence of Hertha BSC Berlin was revoked for the 1964–65 season and the team relegated to the Regionalliga Berlin (Regional leagues being the leagues below the Bundesliga at the time) for breaking the league's player salary rules, partially in an attempt to entice players to Berlin at the time of the construction of the Berlin Wall and high Cold War tensions. The last place clubs, Karlsruher SC and FC Schalke 04, tried to avoid being demoted by laying claim to Hertha's place. It was decided to suspend relegation for one season and increase the number of teams in the league from 16 to 18 to accommodate the two teams which would normally be promoted from the Regionalligen. The politics of the Cold War era led to a space being held open for a Berlin side to replace Hertha in a show of solidarity with the former capital city. What followed was the debacle of the promotion of Tasmania 1900 Berlin, which went on to the worst season in league history.

West Germany made another appearance in the final of the World Cup in 1966, losing (4–2) to England in extra time that included a famously controversial goal.

== The 1970s ==
The young league got off to a difficult start in the decade as a scandal broke with Kickers Offenbach president Horst-Gregorio Canellas putting forward evidence of players being bribed to affect the outcome of games. Allegations were that a number of clubs, including Bielefeld, Hertha, Schalke, and Köln, were involved. The scandal caused a disastrous loss of confidence in the Bundesliga and game attendance plummeted. Investigations by the DFB led to the banning of many players, although most of these sentences were commuted. Arminia Bielefeld, identified as the club central to the scandal, was stripped of all points they had earned during the 1971–72 season and then relegated to the league below.

Enthusiasm for the sport was restored by host West Germany's win in the 1974 World Cup and the first wins by Bundesliga sides in the European Champions Cup (a triple by Bayern Munich in 1974, 1975 and 1976) and the UEFA Cup (Borussia Mönchengladbach in 1975). Attendance rose steadily after the end of the bribery scandal, putting some teams on solid enough financial footings to be able to attract the first foreign stars to the league in the 1977–78 season.

The Bundesliga was dominated by two sides through the 1970s. Borussia Mönchengladbach became the first team to successfully defend its title with its win in 1970–71. Bayern Munich became the first three-time champion with wins in 1971–72, 1972–73 and 1973–74. Borussia Mönchengladbach then turned a triple of its own over the following three seasons. After wins by Köln and Hamburg, Bayern closed out the decade by matching Mönchengladbach's five titles.

== The 1980s ==
The 1980s were a rather bleak decade for the Bundesliga. There was a general decline in attendance throughout the league: in the 1977–78 season average attendance for a Bundesliga match was over 26,000 — the best since 1964–65. By 1985–86 that figure bottomed out at just 17,600 spectators per game. The country's football was also affected by the general European problem of hooliganism and the appearance of neo-Nazi fan groups. The German domestic game became a graceless, rough-edged, brute physical contest devoid of the kinds of star players fans had enjoyed watching in earlier decades. The best German players were regularly lured south to play in Serie A by cash-rich Italian clubs. Bayern Munich's domination of the Bundesliga became numbingly repetitive as they took six of ten titles in the 1980s.

But by the end of the decade the stage was set for some fundamental changes to the Bundesliga. The league signed its first rich television contract and German re-unification and the subsequent merger of the football leagues of East and West Germany was on the horizon.

== The 1990s ==
In 1991, a year after German reunification, East Germany's Deutscher Fußball-Verband der DDR, or Football Federation of the German Democratic Republic, was merged into West Germany's DFB. East German sides were seeded and assigned to various levels within the West German league structure, which was itself modified to accommodate the influx of new clubs. To facilitate the union with the eastern league the Bundesliga temporarily expanded to 20 clubs in the 1991–92 season and added the DDR-Oberliga's top two sides, Dynamo Dresden and Hansa Rostock. The Bundesliga returned to an 18 team slate in the following season with Dresden managing to stick in the top league, while Rostock was relegated. These two teams continued to make appearances in the Bundesliga through the 1990s. The only other former East German sides to earn promotion to the Bundesliga to date are FC Energie Cottbus, VfB Leipzig, and RB Leipzig while a half dozen others of these clubs have played in 2. Bundesliga.

Beginning with the 1995–96 season, the league adopted a new scoring system. Teams were now awarded three points for a win rather than two as had been traditional, with a view toward encouraging more effort through a greater reward in the standings.

Since the beginning of the 1990s, the Bundesliga again enjoyed increasing popularity in Germany. This was on one hand due to the success of the Germany national football team (third World Cup title in 1990 and third European Championships title in 1996). The Bundesliga also began to take a more deliberate approach to marketing and promoting itself and its member clubs, following the example of other more widely recognized European leagues.

In 1998, 1. FC Kaiserslautern became the first (and so far, only) team in Bundesliga and German history to win the league championship as a newly promoted team, having won the 2. Bundesliga title the previous year.

== Into the new millennium ==
Until 2001, the Bundesliga was directly under the control of German football's governing body the Deutscher Fußball-Bund (DFB or German Football Association). This changed with the formation of the Deutsche Fußball-Liga (DFL or German Football League) when the Bundesligen came under the auspices of this new body. The DFL, while remaining subordinate to the DFB, manages Germany's professional leagues and is responsible for the issuing of licences to clubs, general fiscal oversight of the Bundesligen, and marketing rights for the two upper leagues.

Since the launch of the Bundesliga on 24 August 1963 fifty-five clubs have played in the league ranks. To help celebrate the 40th anniversary of the league, two clubs with distinguished Bundesliga histories met in a game on 24 August 2003: Hamburger SV, once known as the "dinosaur" for being the only club which has played in every season of the league's existence until relegation in 2018, and Bayern Munich, the most successful side in German football, which had just won their seventeenth Bundesliga title.

In 2005, German football was once again overshadowed by the discovery of a match-fixing scandal involving second division referee Robert Hoyzer, who confessed to fixing and betting on matches in the 2. Bundesliga, the DFB-Pokal (German Cup), and the Regionalliga (III). The games included a DFB-Pokal first-round match between regional side Paderborn and Bundesliga heavyweights Hamburg on 21 August 2004. Hamburg lost (2–4) through penalties and a red-card awarded to the side and they were eliminated from the lucrative competition.

Hoyzer was banned for life and received a 29-month prison sentence. He soon implicated other officials, players, and a group of Croatian-based gamblers, leading to an ongoing investigation. To this point, at the end of 2005, it appears that the scandal did not directly involve the Bundesliga and was confined to lower divisions:

- referee Dominik Marks was banned for life and received an 18-month sentence for his involvement
- one-time Bundesliga player Jürgen Jansen received a fine and 9-month suspended sentence for accepting bribes to influence games he played in
- three Croatian brothers orchestrating the scheme received varying sentences (35 months to 12 months — suspended)
- referee Torsten Koop received a three-month ban for not promptly reporting an approach from Hoyzer
- Hamburger SV received compensation worth a minimum of 2 million Euros for its forced early exit from the DFB-Pokal, compensation arrangements are planned for certain other teams affected
- after review, replays were ordered for a number of lower division games, while other results will stand
- a number of changes were put in place to ensure closer oversight of referees and other game officials

Despite the scandal, the Bundesliga continues to set new attendance records. In the Bundesliga's 43rd season, total attendance was about 12.41 million in 306 games for an average of 40,572 per game, a 6.9% increase over the preceding year, making the 2005–06 season the 5th consecutive record attendance year. After a decrease in 2006–07 and a slight recovery in 2007–08, new records were set in 2008–09, with 12.82 million total attendance and a per-game average of 41,904. The 2008–09 figure makes the Bundesliga the best-attended national football league in the world by per-game attendance. It is also third in per-game attendance among major professional sports leagues in the world, slightly ahead of the Australian Football League (Australian rules) and well behind the second-ranked Indian Premier League (Twenty20 cricket) and top-ranked NFL (American football) in the United States. Top drawing clubs based on average attendance included: Borussia Dortmund 72,850; FC Bayern Munich 67,214; FC Schalke 04 61,177; and Hamburger SV 53,298. Interest in the league was piqued by the 2006 FIFA World Cup hosted in Germany. An ambitious program of stadium upgrades was undertaken in preparation for the tournament.

The 2. Bundesliga saw an enormous increase in popularity in 2006–07, drawing about 4.67 million spectators for an average of 15,253. This not only smashed the league's previous attendance record, but also marked an increase of more than 20% over the 2005–06 season. The league saw another huge increase in popularity in 2007–08, drawing 5.55 million spectators for an average of 18,140, an increase of almost 19% over the previous season, which briefly made the 2. Bundesliga the most-attended second-level professional sports league in the world on a per-game basis. However, the league would lose almost all of these gains in 2008–09, with total attendance of 4.76 million and an average of 15,550. Although the Second Bundesliga is now second in attendance to England's Football League Championship among second-level professional sports leagues, it still draws more spectators per game than the top leagues in such established footballing nations as Turkey, Russia, and Portugal.

Starting with the 2008–09 season, a new third-level league, the 3. Liga, was launched, slotting between the 2. Bundesliga and the Regionalliga in the league pyramid. Unlike the Bundesligen, the 3. Liga is operated directly by the DFB. At the same time, the Regionalliga went from two divisions to three.

One of the problems currently facing the league is in the performance and fate of clubs from the former East Germany, which are finding it difficult to compete with the wealthy, established western sides. One-time GDR clubs are unable to attract lucrative sponsorships, cannot afford the salaries needed to hold on to their "homegrown" talent, and find themselves playing in crumbling or primitive stadium facilities. Of the 36 clubs in the top two levels of the league system in the 2011–12 season, five are from the former East Germany, an increase of two from 2010 to 2011. However, as in the previous two seasons, none will be in the First Bundesliga. The five former Eastern clubs in the 2. Bundesliga are Energie Cottbus, who last appeared in the First Bundesliga in 2008–09; Union Berlin, from the former East Berlin, who have been in the 2. Bundesliga since being promoted as champions of the inaugural season of the 3. Liga; Erzgebirge Aue, present since the 2010–11 season; Hansa Rostock, who immediately returned from a one-season stint in the 3. Liga; and Dynamo Dresden, making their first appearance at the second level in five years. Four other eastern clubs are playing in the 2011–12 3. Liga—Carl Zeiss Jena, Chemnitz, Rot-Weiß Erfurt, and the Potsdam club Babelsberg.

In preparations for the 2006 World Cup, the DFB attempted to fairly balance the number of venues between the eastern and western halves of the country. However, the organization had to face up to the reality of there not being enough suitable facilities in the old DDR –not limited to stadiums, but including hotels, restaurants and other visitor needs, and transportation infrastructure–, with the result that the east finds itself underrepresented. Only one of the 2006 venues was in the former East Germany (in Leipzig). Similarly, only one of the nine venues for the 2011 FIFA Women's World Cup, also held in Germany, was in the former East Germany (in Dresden). The situation fits into the broader context of the effects of German reunification on East Germany and the resentment that many Ossis feel for their western cousins.

RB Leipzig is one notable club that produced a major resurgence of football in the former East Germany. This club saw several successive promotions in a short period of time and gained promotion to the Bundesliga for the 2016–17 season. The club's success has been controversial. RB Leipzig was founded by initiative of drink company Red Bull GmbH, whose involvement in the club has sparked new discussions about commercialism in professional football.

The 2012–13 season saw FC Bayern Munich become the first club ever to achieve the treble by winning the Bundesliga, DFB-Pokal, and European Cup.

Bayern Munich made German football history even further by earning a record fourth consecutive Bundesliga title in 2016, and eventually became the first German club to attain more than four championships in succession by winning their fifth and sixth titles in 2017 and 2018 respectively for the club's 27th league title and their 28th nationally, both new records.

Meanwhile, after 55 seasons, Hamburger SV was relegated from the Bundesliga to the 2. Bundesliga for the first time in the club's history. During the 2017–18 season, a final day win over Gladbach was not enough to escape the drop as Wolfsburg won against Cologne. Hamburg had to endure a disastrous season under various managers after surviving two playoffs in the preceding four seasons.

== German Football League structure ==
German Football League structure / 1903 to present
	Germany	Germany	West Germany	West Germany	West Germany	Germany	Germany	East Germany
Class	2008–present	1994–2008	1974–1994	1963–1974	1946–1963	1933–1945	1903–1932	GDR 1949–1991
I	Bundesliga	Bundesliga	Bundesliga	Bundesliga	Oberliga	Gauliga	Verbandsliga	DDR Oberliga
II	2.Bundesliga	2.Bundesliga	2.Bundesliga	Regionalliga	2.Oberliga	Bezirksliga	Bezirksliga	DDR Liga
III	3.Liga	Regionalliga	Am. Oberliga	1. Amateurliga	1. Amateurliga	▼ ???	▼ ???	Bezirksliga
IV	Regionalliga	Oberliga	Landesliga/ Verbandsliga¹	2. Amateurliga	2. Amateurliga			Bezirksklasse
V	Oberliga	Landesliga/ Verbandsliga¹	Landesliga	A-Klasse	A-Klasse			Kreisklasse
VI	Landesliga	Bezirksoberliga²	▼ ???	B-Klasse	B-Klasse
VII	Bezirksoberliga	Bezirksliga		C-Klasse	C-Klasse
VIII	Bezirksliga	Kreisliga³
IX	Kreisliga	Kreisklasse A / 1. Kreisklasse
X	Kreisklasse A / 1. Kreisklasse	Kreisliga A / 2. Kreisklasse
XI	Kreisliga A / 2. Kreisklasse	Kreisliga B / 3. Kreisklasse
XII	Kreisliga B / 3. Kreisklasse	Kreisliga C / 4. Kreisklasse
XIII	Kreisliga C / 4. Kreisklasse

¹ called "Landesliga" in some parts of the country, "Verbandsliga" in others, and in some parts there is a Verbandsliga (V) and a Landesliga (VI).
² the Bezirksoberliga is not established in all areas of the country, e.g. in Mittelrhein.
³ the Kreisliga is not established in all areas of the country, e.g. in Mittelrhein.

== Men's honours ==
=== Major competitions ===
FIFA World Cup

- Champions (4): 1954, 1974, 1990, 2014
- Runners-up (4): 1966, 1982, 1986, 2002
- Third place (4): 1934, 1970, 2006, 2010
- Fourth place (1): 1958

UEFA European Championship

- Champions (3): 1972, 1980, 1996
- Runners-up (3): 1976, 1992, 2008
- Third place (3): 1988, 2012, 2016

Summer Olympic Games

- Gold Medal (1): 1976
- Silver Medal (2): 1980, 2016
- Bronze Medal (3): 1964, 1972, 1988
- Fourth place (1): 1952

FIFA Confederations Cup

- Champions (1): 2017
- Third place (1): 2005

Overview
Event	1st place	2nd place	3rd place	4th place
FIFA World Cup	4	4	4	1
UEFA European Championship	3	3	3	x
Summer Olympic Games	1	2	3	1
FIFA Confederations Cup	1	0	1	0
UEFA Nations League	0	0	0	0
Total	9	9	11	2

== Women's honours ==
=== Major competitions ===
FIFA Women's World Cup

- Champions (2): 2003, 2007
- Runners-up (1): 1995
- Fourth place (2): 1991, 2015

UEFA Women's Championship

- Champions (8): 1989, 1991, 1995, 1997, 2001, 2005, 2009, 2013
- Runners-up (1): 2022
- Fourth place (1): 1993

Summer Olympic Games

- Gold Medal (1): 2016
- Bronze Medal (3): 2000, 2004, 2008

Overview
Event	1st place	2nd place	3rd place	4th place
FIFA Women's World Cup	2	1	0	2
UEFA Women's Championship	8	1	0	1
Summer Olympic Games	1	0	3	0
Total	11	2	3	3

== See also ==
- Football in Germany
- German Football Museum in Dortmund
