= 1937–38 Gauliga =

Gauliga
- Season: 1937–38
- Champions: 16 regional winners
- German champions: Hannover 96; 1st German title

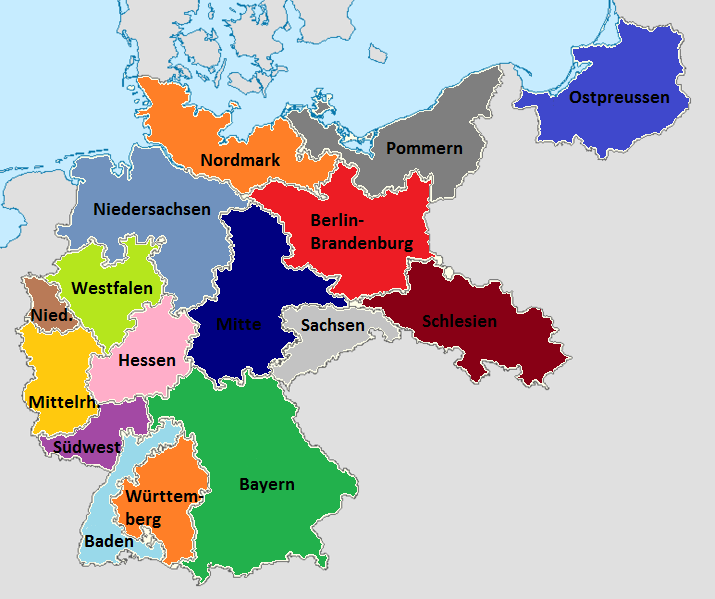
The initial 16 districts of the Gauliga in 1933

The 1937–38 Gauliga was the fifth season of the Gauliga, the first tier of the football league system in Germany from 1933 to 1945.

The league operated in sixteen regional divisions, of which the Gauliga Ostpreußen was sub-divided into four regional groups, with the league containing 180 clubs all up, three less than the previous season. The league champions entered the 1938 German football championship, won by Hannover 96 who defeated FC Schalke 04 4–3 after extra time in the final. It was Hannover's first-ever national championship.

Three clubs remained unbeaten during the league season, those being FC Schalke 04, Eimsbütteler TV and Hamburger SV, the latter two both from the same league, the Gauliga Nordmark. At the other end of the table two clubs finished the season without a win, SV 1912 Grüna and SV Linden 1907. Hamburger SV scored the most goals of any Gauliga club with 103 while FV Wilhelmsburg conceded the most with 95. Eimsbütteler TV and Hamburger SV achieved the highest points total with 41 while SV Linden 1907 and RSV Ortelsburg earned the least with two points to their name.

The 1937–38 season saw the fourth edition of the Tschammerpokal, now the DFB-Pokal. The 1938 edition was won by SK Rapid Wien, defeating FSV Frankfurt 3–1 on 8 January 1939.

During the 1937–38 season, in March 1938, Nazi Germany annexed Austria in what is commonly referred to as the Anschluss. Austrian clubs took part in the Gauliga from the 1938–39 season onwards in the form of the Gauliga Ostmark but already entered the 1938 Tschammerpokal which was won by Rapid Wien, a club from Vienna. It marked the beginning of the expansion of Nazi Germany and, consequently, the Gauligas, with the Sudetenland and the formation of the Gauliga Sudetenland to follow next.

== Champions ==
The 1937–38 Gauliga champions qualified for the group stage of the German championship, with the exception of Mittelrhein champions SV Beuel 06. Fortuna Düsseldorf, Hamburger SV, FC Schalke 04 and Hannover 96 won their championship groups and advanced to the semi-finals with the latter two reaching the championship final which Hannover won.

FC Schalke 04 won their fifth consecutive Gauliga title while Fortuna Düsseldorf and 1. FC Nürnberg won their third consecutive one and SV Dessau 05, Hamburger SV, BC Hartha and VfB Stuttgart defended their 1936–37 Gauliga titles.

Club	League	No. of clubs
VfR Mannheim	Gauliga Baden	10
1. FC Nürnberg	Gauliga Bayern (1937–38 season)	10
Berliner SV 92	Gauliga Berlin-Brandenburg	10
FC Hanau 93	Gauliga Hessen	10
SV Dessau 05	Gauliga Mitte	10
SV Beuel 06^{‡}	Gauliga Mittelrhein	10
Fortuna Düsseldorf	Gauliga Niederrhein	10
Hannover 96	Gauliga Niedersachsen	10
Hamburger SV	Gauliga Nordmark	12
Yorck Boyen Insterburg	Gauliga Ostpreußen	28
SC Stettin	Gauliga Pommern	10
BC Hartha	Gauliga Sachsen	10
Vorwärts-Rasensport Gleiwitz	Gauliga Schlesien	10
Eintracht Frankfurt	Gauliga Südwest	10
FC Schalke 04	Gauliga Westfalen	10
VfB Stuttgart	Gauliga Württemberg	10

- ^{‡} The Gauliga Mittelrhein championship was later awarded to SV Beuel 06 but this decision came after Alemannia Aachen had already started playing in the German championship, leaving the latter to compete in the 1938 edition.
