= 1949–50 Oberliga =

Oberliga
- Season: 1949–50
- Champions: Hamburger SV Tennis Borussia Berlin Borussia Dortmund: 1. FC Kaiserslautern; SpVgg Fürth
- Relegated: VfB Lübeck Harburger TB VfL Nord Berlin Rhenania Würselen TSG Vohwinkel Arminia Bielefeld FV Duisburg 08 SpVgg Weisenau BSC Oppau FSV Kürenz VfR Kirn Jahn Regensburg Stuttgarter Kickers
- German champions: VfB Stuttgart; 1st German title
- Top goalscorer: Werner Baßler, Ottmar Walter (45 goals)

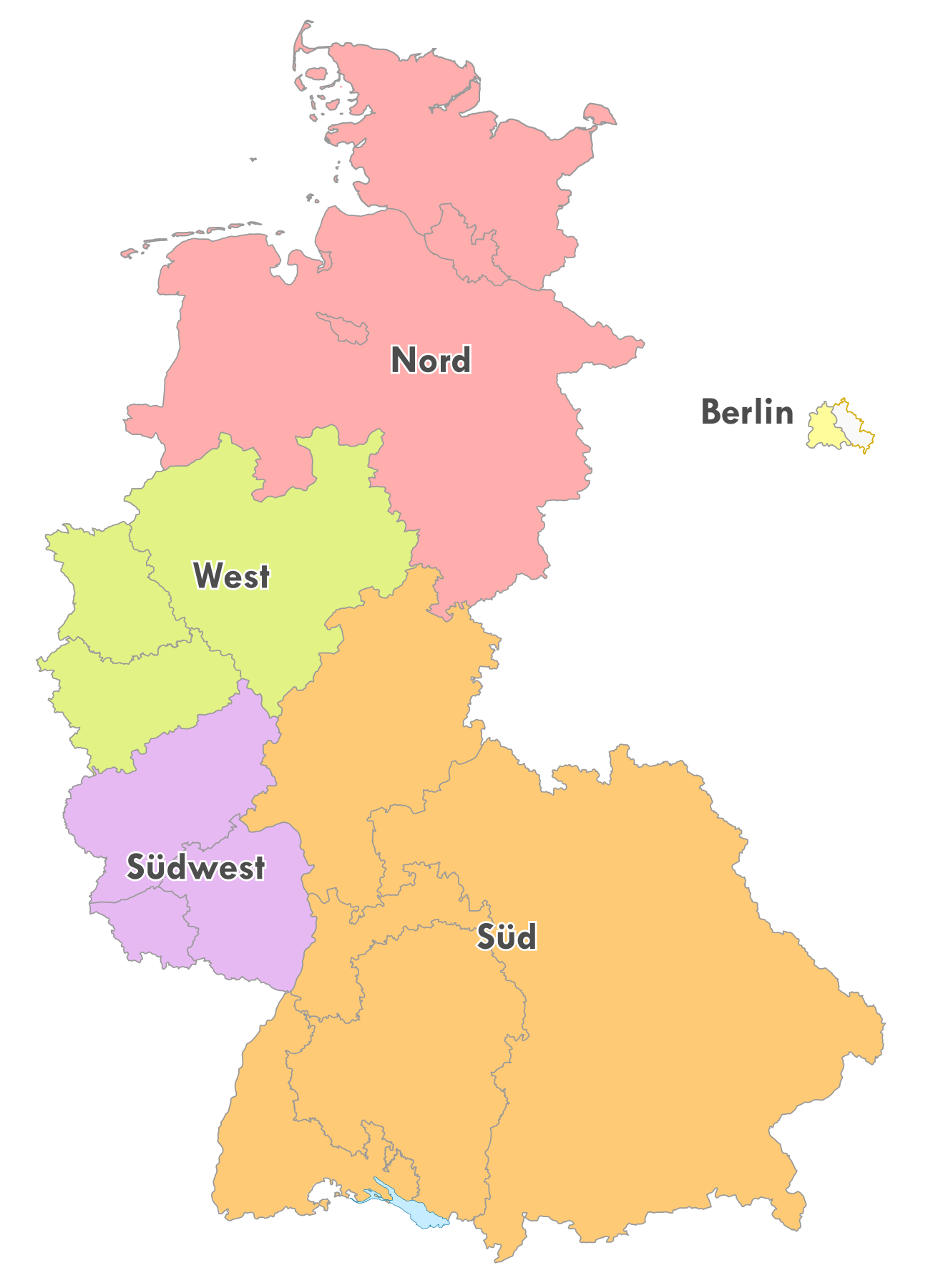
Map of the five German Oberligas 1950 to 1963

The 1949–50 Oberliga was the fifth season of the Oberliga, the first tier of the football league system in West Germany. The league operated in six regional divisions, Berlin, North, South, Southwest (north and south) and West. The five league champions and runners-up as well as the third and fourth placed teams in the West and South and the third placed team in the Southwest and North entered the 1950 German football championship which was won by VfB Stuttgart. It was VfB Stuttgart's first-ever national championship.

The 1949–50 season was the last with clubs from East Berlin in the Oberliga, with VfB Pankow and Union Oberschöneweide leaving the league at the end of the season, thereby ending unified German league football for the next four decades. Union Oberschöneweide was replaced by the West Berlin club Union 06 Berlin, formed by former Oberschöneweide players who had moved to the West.

For the Oberliga Südwest, covering the whole of the French occupation zone in Germany, it was the last season of the league being divided into two regional divisions, north and south. The clubs from the southern division re-joined the Southern German Football Association at the end of seasons with two clubs entering the Oberliga Süd for the following season, three clubs the 2. Oberliga Süd and the rest being relegated to the Amateurligas.

A similar-named league, the DDR-Oberliga, existed in East Germany, set at the first tier of the East German football league system. The 1949–50 DDR-Oberliga, the inaugural season of the league, was won by ZSG Horch Zwickau.

== Oberliga Nord ==
The 1949–50 season saw three new clubs promoted to the league, Hannover 96, Harburger TB and VfB Oldenburg, while Holstein Kiel was re-admitted after initially having been forcibly relegated during the previous season. The league's top scorer was Adolf Vetter of VfL Osnabrück with 28 goals, the third consecutive time he finished as top scorer.

Pos	Team	Pld	W	D	L	GF	GA	GD	Pts	Promotion, qualification or relegation
1	Hamburger SV	30	21	6	3	101	39	+62	48	Qualification to German championship
2	FC St. Pauli	30	17	5	8	62	42	+20	39	Qualification to German championship
3	VfL Osnabrück	30	17	4	9	70	53	+17	38	Qualification to German championship
4	Werder Bremen	30	16	4	10	78	44	+34	36	
5	Eintracht Braunschweig	30	14	8	8	54	48	+6	36	
6	Concordia Hamburg	30	15	6	9	72	65	+7	36	
7	Hannover 96	30	13	5	12	58	61	−3	31	
8	Eimsbütteler TV	30	13	4	13	58	50	+8	30	
9	VfB Oldenburg	30	13	4	13	56	62	−6	30	
10	TuS Bremerhaven 93	30	13	4	13	57	65	−8	30	
11	Holstein Kiel	30	12	4	14	51	49	+2	28	
12	Arminia Hannover	30	11	5	14	38	44	−6	27	
13	Göttingen 05	30	8	6	16	45	66	−21	22	
14	Bremer SV	30	9	3	18	50	71	−21	21	
15	VfB Lübeck (R)	30	8	4	18	40	65	−25	20	Relegation to Amateurliga
16	Harburger TB (R)	30	3	2	25	37	103	−66	8	Relegation to Amateurliga

Source: RSSSF.com
Rules for classification: 1) Points;
(R) Relegated

== Oberliga Berlin ==
The 1949–50 season saw three new clubs promoted to the league, Hertha BSC Berlin, VfB Britz and Tasmania 1900 Berlin. The league's top scorer was Heinz Rogge of Union Oberschöneweide with 29 goals.

Pos	Team	Pld	W	D	L	GF	GA	GD	Pts	Promotion, qualification or relegation
1	Tennis Borussia Berlin	22	17	1	4	60	26	+34	35	Qualification to German championship
2	Union Oberschöneweide	22	15	2	5	69	31	+38	32	Qualification to German championship & Withdrawn to DDR-Oberliga
3	Berliner SV 92	22	14	4	4	68	33	+35	32	
4	Alemannia 90 Berlin	22	13	4	5	59	36	+23	30	
5	Wacker 04 Berlin	22	9	4	9	46	32	+14	22	
6	BFC Südring	22	8	5	9	37	42	−5	21	
7	Tasmania 1900 Berlin	22	7	6	9	34	45	−11	20	
8	VfB Pankow	22	8	2	12	31	51	−20	18	Withdrawn to DDR-Oberliga
9	Viktoria 89 Berlin	22	5	7	10	42	55	−13	17	
10	Hertha BSC Berlin	22	5	6	11	32	44	−12	16	
11	VfB Britz	22	4	6	12	30	58	−28	14	
12	VfL Nord Berlin (R)	22	2	3	17	26	82	−56	7	Relegation to Amateurliga

Source: RSSSF.com
Rules for classification: 1) Points;
(R) Relegated

== Oberliga West ==
The 1949–50 season saw four new clubs promoted to the league, 1. FC Köln, Arminia Bielefeld, FV Duisburg 08 and Duisburger SV. The league's top scorer was Alfred Preißler of Borussia Dortmund with 24 goals.

Pos	Team	Pld	W	D	L	GF	GA	GD	Pts	Promotion, qualification or relegation
1	Borussia Dortmund	30	20	3	7	76	36	+40	43	Qualification to German championship
2	Preußen Dellbrück	30	17	5	8	55	41	+14	39	Qualification to German championship
3	Rot-Weiß Essen	30	17	4	9	78	47	+31	38	Qualification to German championship
4	STV Horst-Emscher	30	14	9	7	62	35	+27	37	Qualification to German championship
5	1. FC Köln	30	16	5	9	61	39	+22	37	
6	FC Schalke 04	30	17	3	10	65	55	+10	37	
7	SpVgg Erkenschwick	30	13	8	9	49	42	+7	34	
8	Preußen Münster	30	11	6	13	53	42	+11	28	
9	Sportfreunde Hamborn	30	9	10	11	50	55	−5	28	
10	Duisburger SV	30	10	7	13	51	65	−14	27	
11	Rot-Weiß Oberhausen	30	10	7	13	46	60	−14	27	
12	Alemannia Aachen	30	9	9	12	37	56	−19	27	
13	Rhenania Würselen (R)	30	10	6	14	45	52	−7	26	Relegation to the 2. Oberliga West
14	TSG Vohwinkel (R)	30	7	7	16	42	68	−26	21	Relegation to the 2. Oberliga West
15	Arminia Bielefeld (R)	30	5	7	18	32	72	−40	17	Relegation to the 2. Oberliga West
16	FV Duisburg 08 (R)	30	6	2	22	29	66	−37	14	Relegation to the 2. Oberliga West

Source: RSSSF.com
Rules for classification: 1) Points;
(R) Relegated

== Oberliga Südwest ==
=== Northern group ===
The 1949–50 season saw four new clubs promoted to the league, VfR Kaiserslautern, ASV Landau, VfR Kirn and FV Engers. The league's top scorers were Werner Baßler and Ottmar Walter of 1. FC Kaiserslautern with 45 goals each, the highest total for the Oberliga's in 1949–50.

Pos	Team	Pld	W	D	L	GF	GA	GD	Pts	Promotion, qualification or relegation
1	1. FC Kaiserslautern	30	25	4	1	157	24	+133	54	Qualification to German championship
2	Wormatia Worms	30	23	5	2	104	21	+83	51	Qualification to German championship
3	TuS Neuendorf	30	22	2	6	96	36	+60	46	Qualification to German championship play-offs
4	FK Pirmasens	30	21	3	6	68	36	+32	45	
5	Phönix Ludwigshafen	30	14	7	9	68	59	+9	35	
6	ASV Landau	30	12	7	11	48	62	−14	31	
7	VfL Neustadt	30	12	5	13	62	56	+6	29	
8	SpVgg Andernach	30	13	3	14	68	62	+6	29	
9	VfR Kaiserslautern	30	11	6	13	60	59	+1	28	
10	FV Engers	30	12	3	15	62	84	−22	27	
11	FSV Mainz 05	30	10	6	14	48	74	−26	26	
12	Eintracht Trier	30	7	8	15	45	72	−27	22	
13	SpVgg Weisenau (R)	30	4	8	18	50	97	−47	16	Relegation to Amateurliga
14	BSC Oppau (R)	30	4	7	19	32	83	−51	15	Relegation to Amateurliga
15	FSV Kürenz (R)	30	4	5	21	43	108	−65	13	Relegation to Amateurliga
16	VfR Kirn (R)	30	5	3	22	42	120	−78	13	Relegation to Amateurliga

Source: RSSSF.com
Rules for classification: 1) Points;
(R) Relegated

=== Southern group ===
The 1949–50 season saw five new clubs promoted to the league, FV Kuppenheim, FV Lahr, SV Trossingen SV Hechingen and TV Ebingen. The division was disbanded at the end of the season.

Pos	Team	Pld	W	D	L	GF	GA	GD	Pts	Promotion, qualification or relegation
1	SSV Reutlingen	30	22	2	6	74	33	+41	46	Qualification to German championship & Oberliga Süd
2	SV Tübingen (R)	30	19	3	8	67	36	+31	41	Relegation to 2. Oberliga Süd & Qualification German championship play-offs
3	Freiburger FC (R)	29	17	7	5	63	34	+29	41	Relegation to 2. Oberliga Süd & Qualification German championship play-offs
4	FC Singen 04	30	16	8	6	61	35	+26	40	Qualification to Oberliga Süd
5	VfL Konstanz (R)	30	15	6	9	66	38	+28	36	Relegation to 2. Oberliga Süd
6	FV Kuppenheim (R)	30	15	6	9	66	62	+4	36	Relegation to Amateurliga
7	TV Ebingen (R)	30	14	6	10	46	39	+7	34	Relegation to Amateurliga
8	FC Rastatt 04 (R)	30	13	7	10	59	48	+11	33	Relegation to Amateurliga
9	FC 08 Villingen (R)	30	13	3	14	60	57	+3	29	Relegation to Amateurliga
10	FV Lahr (R)	30	11	5	14	47	55	−8	27	Relegation to Amateurliga
11	FV Offenburg (R)	30	9	9	12	37	54	−17	27	Relegation to Amateurliga
12	SC Freiburg (R)	30	9	6	15	52	63	−11	24	Relegation to Amateurliga
13	VfL Schwenningen (R)	30	8	5	17	53	67	−14	21	Relegation to Amateurliga
14	VfB Friedrichshafen (R)	30	8	5	17	35	64	−29	21	Relegation to Amateurliga
15	SV Trossingen (R)	30	6	6	18	48	63	−15	18	Relegation to Amateurliga
16	SV Hechingen (R)	30	2	2	26	27	113	−86	6	Relegation to Amateurliga

Source: RSSSF.com
Rules for classification: 1) Points;
(R) Relegated

=== Final ===
The winners of the two regional divisions of the Oberliga Südwest played a final to determine the league champion who was also directly qualified for the German championship:

Team 1	Score	Team 2
1. FC Kaiserslautern	6–1 aet	SSV Reutlingen

The runners-up of the two divisions determined the club who would face the loser of the championship final for the second place in the German championship:

Team 1	Score	Team 2
Wormatia Worms	6–0	SV Tübingen

Team 1	Score	Team 2
SSV Reutlingen	4–3 aet	Wormatia Worms

The third-placed teams of the two divisions determined the club who would face the loser of the second-place final for the third place in the German championship:

Team 1	Score	Team 2
TuS Neuendorf	4–1	Freiburger FC

Team 1	Score	Team 2
TuS Neuendorf	1–0	Wormatia Worms

== Oberliga Süd ==
The 1949–50 season saw two new clubs promoted to the league, SpVgg Fürth and Jahn Regensburg. The league's top scorer was Horst Schade of SpVgg Fürth with 21 goals.

Pos	Team	Pld	W	D	L	GF	GA	GD	Pts	Promotion, qualification or relegation
1	SpVgg Fürth	30	18	7	5	77	39	+38	43	Qualification to German championship
2	VfB Stuttgart (C)	30	15	8	7	50	39	+11	38	Qualification to German championship
3	Kickers Offenbach	30	15	7	8	62	48	+14	37	Qualification to German championship
4	VfR Mannheim	30	14	6	10	57	41	+16	34	Qualification to German championship
5	FSV Frankfurt	30	13	8	9	45	38	+7	34	
6	SV Waldhof Mannheim	30	11	11	8	51	53	−2	33	
7	VfB Mühlburg	30	11	10	9	44	42	+2	32	
8	1. FC Nürnberg	30	12	7	11	52	40	+12	31	
9	TSV 1860 München	30	14	3	13	46	42	+4	31	
10	BC Augsburg	30	10	6	14	50	74	−24	26	
11	Schwaben Augsburg	30	10	6	14	39	60	−21	26	
12	FC Schweinfurt 05	30	8	9	13	38	38	0	25	
13	Bayern Munich	30	11	3	16	56	70	−14	25	
14	Eintracht Frankfurt	30	8	8	14	45	52	−7	24	
15	Jahn Regensburg (R)	30	8	6	16	49	66	−17	22	Relegation to the 2. Oberliga Süd
16	Stuttgarter Kickers (R)	30	5	9	16	45	64	−19	19	Relegation to the 2. Oberliga Süd

Source: RSSSF.com
Rules for classification: 1) Points;
(C) Champions; (R) Relegated

== German championship ==
The 1950 German football championship was contested by the eight qualified Oberliga teams and won by VfB Stuttgart, defeating Kickers Offenbach in the final. It was the last edition with sixteen clubs in the championship playing a knock-out format. From 1951 onwards the finals were played with eight clubs and in group stages.
