= Hermann Jöckel =

German footballer and manager (1920–1991)

Personal information
- Date of birth: 8 October 1920
- Place of birth: Wiesbaden, Germany
- Date of death: 2 June 1991 (aged 70)
- Position: Goalkeeper

Senior career*
| Years | Team | Apps | (Gls) |
| 1936–1937 | Eintracht Frankfurt | | |
| 1937–1940 | Phönix-Alemannia Karlsruhe | | |
| 1947–1955 | VfR Mannheim | | |
| 1955–1956 | ASV Landau | | |

Managerial career
- 1974–1975: VfR Mannheim
- * Club domestic league appearances and goals

Hermann Jöckel (8 October 1920 – 2 June 1991) was a German footballer who played as a goalkeeper. He won the German football championship with VfR Mannheim in 1949, and briefly managed the club in the 2. Fußball-Bundesliga Süd in 1975.
