= Meisterschale =

German association football trophy

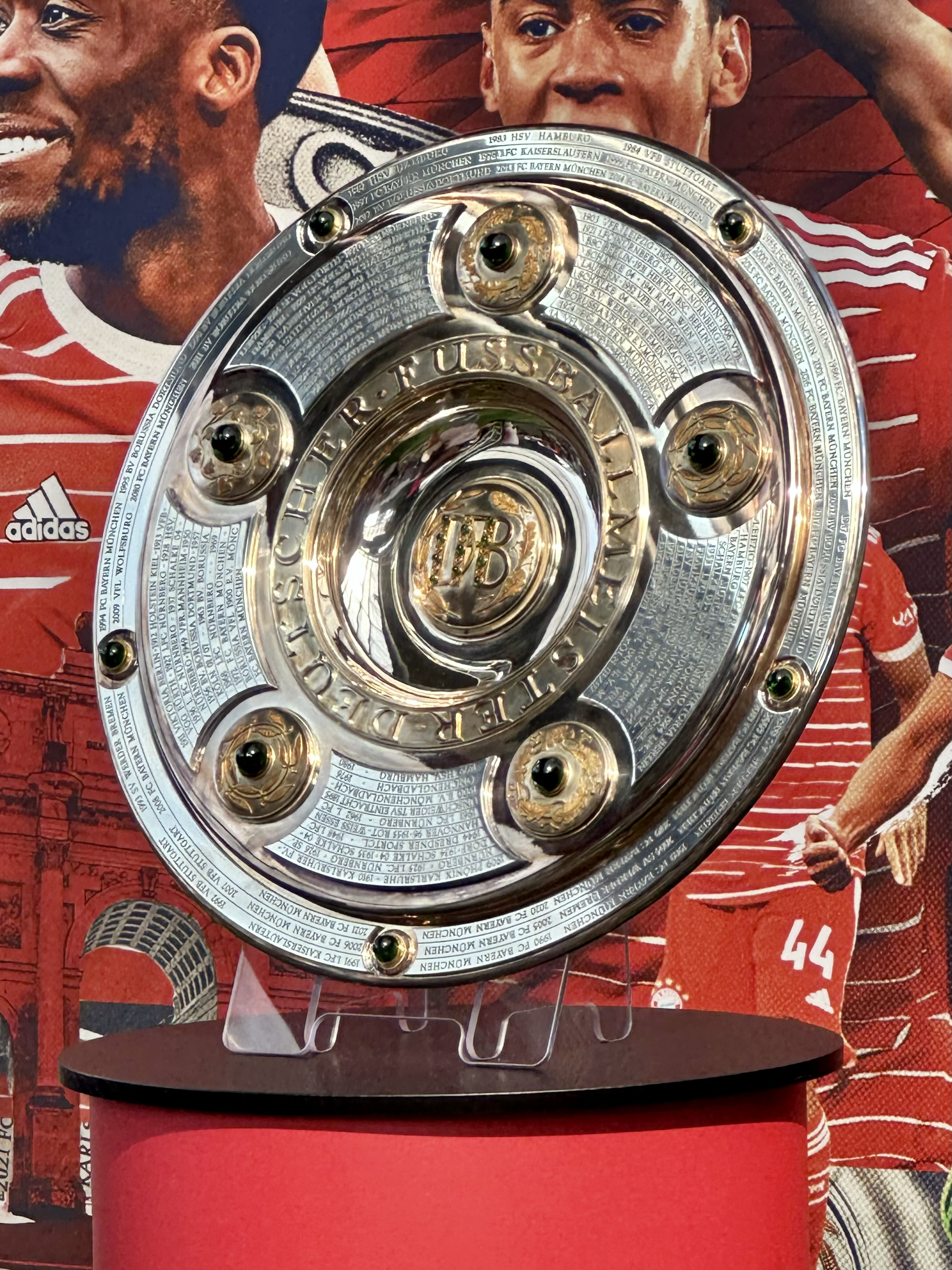
The Meisterschale in exhibition in Singapore, 2023

The Meisterschale ("champions' bowl"), colloquially referred to as the Salatschüssel (salad bowl), is a German association football trophy which has been awarded to the German champions since 1949 and the Bundesliga champions since 1963–64. It replaced the Viktoria, which was the original trophy since 1903 but which disappeared during the final stages of the Second World War only to resurface after the German reunification.

The trophy has all German champions since 1903 engraved on it and has had to be enlarged three times, in 1981, 2009 and 2026. At its current size, there is enough space for all champions until 2056.

A number of copies of the trophy exist because, in the 1980s, the German Football Association (DFB) allowed clubs with multiple championships to create a slightly smaller replica for their trophy cabinets. These copies are now used when more than one club can still win the championship in the last round. The original trophy will then generally be sent to the Bundesliga leader at the time and, should another club win the league, a replica will be awarded until the original can be obtained.

== 2. Bundesliga Meisterschale ==
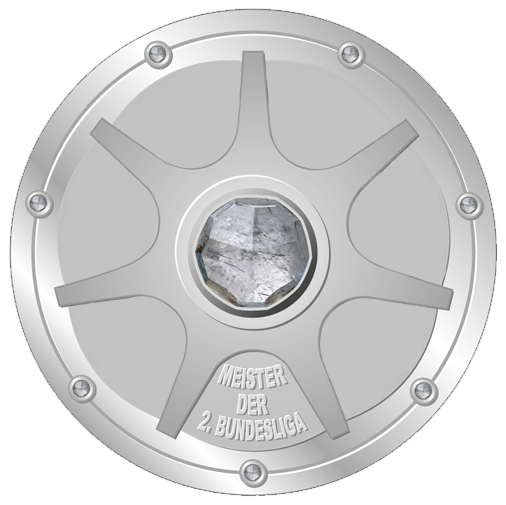
Bundesliga 2 Meisterschale

In the 2008–09 2. Bundesliga season, a hubcap-shaped shield, colloquially (and often derogatorily) called Meisterfelge (Champions' hubcap) or even Radkappe ("wheel cover"), was introduced similar to the original Bundesliga Meisterschale.
