= Gerhard Kaufhold =

German footballer

Personal information
- Full name: Gerhard Kaufhold
- Date of birth: 2 December 1928
- Place of birth: Germany
- Date of death: 4 October 2009 (aged 80)
- Place of death: Offenbach am Main, Germany
- Position: Midfielder

Youth career
- –1946: SSC Juno 1921 Burg

Senior career*
Years	Team	Apps	(Gls)
1946–1964	Kickers Offenbach	396	(112)
Total		396	(112)

International career
1954	West Germany	1	(0)
- * Club domestic league appearances and goals

Gerhard Kaufhold (2 December 1928 – 4 October 2009) was a German footballer who spent his entire career at Kickers Offenbach. He played a total of 396 games in the Oberliga Süd for the club, scoring 112 goals. He also represented West Germany in a 3–1 defeat against England in 1954.
