= Football gods =

Term used in relation to moments of luck or misfortune in different codes of football

Football gods (United States, United Kingdom) or Footy gods (Australia) is a common refrain used by sport broadcasters and commentators to refer to moments of great luck or misfortune experienced footballers, teams and their fans. It is used across different codes of football.

In Australia a segment of the NRL Footy Show had a feature focusing on the notion of the Footy gods pondering "why a League ball bounces this way instead of that...why so called big money players are actually hopeless...or why the ref thought why this was a forward pass!...its enough to make any fan scream to the gods, the footy gods!"

The Cobargo Chronicle from New South Wales in Australia noted in 1900 "That Jupiter Pluvius this winter seems to dispense all his favours on Saturday–the footballers' god should be supplicated on the matter"

== Traits of the Football gods ==
There are common themes used to describe the inclinations of the Football gods:

- Malevolent.
- Vengeful.
