= 1938 German football championship =

1938 German championship
Deutsche Fußballmeisterschaft
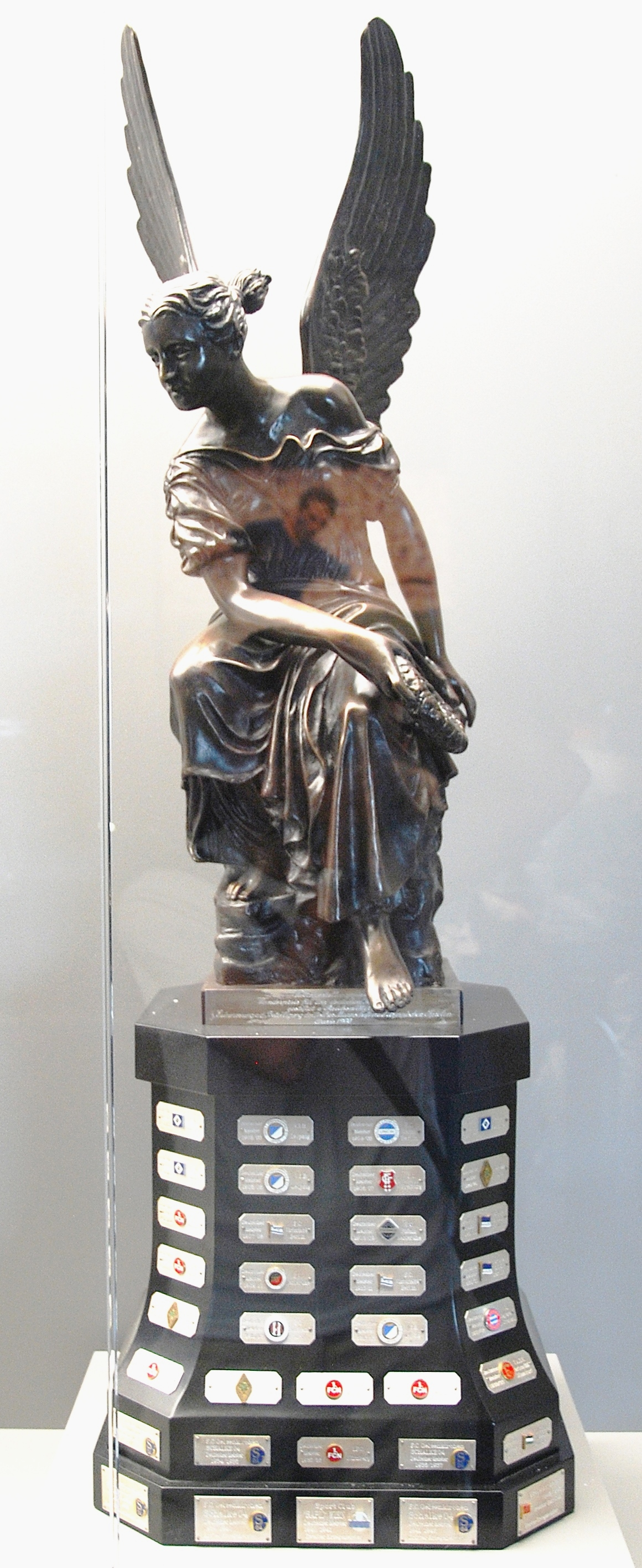
- Replica of the Viktoria trophy

Tournament details
- Country: Germany
- Dates: 13 March – 3 July
- Teams: 16

Final positions
- Champions: Hannover 96; 1st German title
- Runners-up: Schalke 04
- Third place: Fortuna Düsseldorf
- Fourth place: Hamburger SV

Tournament statistics
- Matches played: 54
- Goals scored: 226 (4.19 per match)
- Top goal scorer: Gustav Carstens (9 goals)

The 1938 German football championship, the 31st edition of the competition, was won by Hannover 96, the club's first-ever German championship, by defeating Schalke 04 4–3 after extra time in the final. The 1938 final had to be replayed because the first game had ended in a three-all draw after extra time. For Hannover 96 it marked the first of two national championships, the second coming in 1954, while, for Schalke, it was a short setback in the club's most successful era, having won the 1934, 1935 and 1937 final and going on to win the 1939, 1940 and 1942 ones as well.

The 1938 edition was only the second, after 1922, when a replay of the final was required. FC Schalke 04 entered the final as heavy favourites, having won the national championship in the previous season. In the first game Schalke twice took the lead, 2–0 and 3–1 before Erich Meng equalised in the 87th minute. No goals were scored in extra time, making a replay necessary. The second game, one week later, saw Hannover take the lead before Schalke went ahead twice again only for Hannover to equalise once again in the 87th minute. In the following extra time Erich Meng scored the decisive goal in the 117th minute, giving Hannover its first national title. Erich Meng, who, together with his brother Richard, played a big part in the title win for Hannover, was killed in action less than two years later in the Second World War.

Hamburger SV's Gustav Carstens was the 1938 championships top scorer, with nine goals.

The sixteen 1937–38 Gauliga champions competed in a group stage of four groups of four teams each, with the group winners advancing to the semi-finals. The two semi-final winners then contested the 1938 championship final.

From the following season, the German championship expanded to eighteen clubs and continued to increase in numbers through a combination of territorial expansion of Nazi Germany and the sub-dividing of the Gauligas. In later years, the number of Gauligas reached a strength of thirty-one in its last completed season, 1943–44.

== Qualified teams ==
The teams qualified through the 1937–38 Gauliga season:

Club	Qualified from
VfR Mannheim	Gauliga Baden
1. FC Nürnberg	Gauliga Bayern
Berliner SV 92	Gauliga Berlin-Brandenburg
FC Hanau 93	Gauliga Hessen
SV Dessau 05	Gauliga Mitte
Alemannia Aachen	Gauliga Mittelrhein
Fortuna Düsseldorf	Gauliga Niederrhein
Hannover 96	Gauliga Niedersachsen
Hamburger SV	Gauliga Nordmark
Yorck Boyen Insterburg	Gauliga Ostpreußen
Stettiner SC	Gauliga Pommern
BC Hartha	Gauliga Sachsen
Vorwärts-Rasensport Gleiwitz	Gauliga Schlesien
Eintracht Frankfurt	Gauliga Südwest
Schalke 04	Gauliga Westfalen
VfB Stuttgart	Gauliga Württemberg

- SV Beuel 06 was retrospectively awarded the championship in the Gauliga Mittelrhein but this decision was made too late to replace Alemannia Aachen in the German championship.

== Competition ==
=== Group 1 ===
Group 1 was contested by the champions of the Gauligas Nordmark, Pommern, Südwest and Ostpreußen:

Pos	Team	Pld	W	D	L	GF	GA	GR	Pts	Qualification	HSV	SGE	SSC	YBI
1	Hamburger SV	6	5	0	1	21	5	4.200	10	Advance to semi-finals	—	5–0	2–0	3–1
2	Eintracht Frankfurt	6	5	0	1	24	13	1.846	10		3–2	—	5–0	5–0
3	Stettiner SC	6	2	0	4	12	18	0.667	4		1–3	5–6	—	1–0
4	Yorck Boyen Insterburg	6	0	0	6	4	25	0.160	0		0–6	1–5	2–5	—

Source: RSSSF
Rules for classification: 1) Points; 2) Goal ratio.

=== Group 2 ===
Group 2 was contested by the champions of the Gauligas Baden, Brandenburg, Mitte and Westfalen:

Pos	Team	Pld	W	D	L	GF	GA	GR	Pts	Qualification	S04	MAN	BSV	SVD
1	Schalke 04	6	3	2	1	19	6	3.167	8	Advance to semi-finals	—	1–2	3–0	6–1
2	VfR Mannheim	6	3	2	1	15	10	1.500	8		2–2	—	3–2	6–1
3	Berliner SV	6	1	2	3	8	11	0.727	4		1–1	3–1	—	2–3
4	SV Dessau 05	6	1	2	3	6	21	0.286	4		0–6	1–1	0–0	—

Source: RSSSF
Rules for classification: 1) Points; 2) Goal ratio.

=== Group 3 ===
Group 3 was contested by the champions of the Gauligas Niederrhein, Schlesien, Sachsen and Württemberg:

Pos	Team	Pld	W	D	L	GF	GA	GR	Pts	Qualification	F95	BCH	VFB	VRG
1	Fortuna Düsseldorf	6	4	2	0	14	4	3.500	10	Advance to semi-finals	—	2–2	3–0	3–1
2	BC Hartha	6	1	4	1	8	12	0.667	6		1–1	—	2–1	2–2
3	VfB Stuttgart	6	2	1	3	14	9	1.556	5		0–2	1–1	—	7–1
4	Vorwärts-Rasensport Gleiwitz	6	1	1	4	9	20	0.450	3		0–3	5–0	0–5	—

Source: RSSSF
Rules for classification: 1) Points; 2) Goal ratio.

=== Group 4 ===
Group 4 was contested by the champions of the Gauligas Bayern, Hessen, Mittelrhein and Niedersachsen:

Pos	Team	Pld	W	D	L	GF	GA	GR	Pts	Qualification	H96	FCN	AAC	H93
1	Hannover 96	6	6	0	0	16	5	3.200	12	Advance to semi-finals	—	2–1	6–1	1–0
2	1. FC Nürnberg	6	4	0	2	15	9	1.667	8		1–2	—	4–2	2–1
3	Alemannia Aachen	6	2	0	4	11	17	0.647	4		1–2	1–3	—	2–0
4	FC Hanau 93	6	0	0	6	5	16	0.313	0		1–3	1–4	2–4	—

Source: RSSSF
Rules for classification: 1) Points; 2) Goal ratio.

=== Semi-finals ===
Team 1	Score	Team 2
29 May 1938
Schalke 04	1–0	Fortuna Düsseldorf
Hannover 96	3–2 aet	Hamburger SV

=== Third place play-off ===
Team 1	Score	Team 2
26 June 1938
Fortuna Düsseldorf	0–0 aet	Hamburger SV

==== Replay ====
Team 1	Score	Team 2
3 July 1938
Fortuna Düsseldorf	4–2	Hamburger SV

=== Final ===
Team 1	Score	Team 2
26 June 1938
Hannover 96	3–3 aet	Schalke 04

==== Replay ====
Team 1	Score	Team 2
3 July 1938
Hannover 96	4–3 aet	Schalke 04
