= Fritz Abromeit =

German footballer (1923–2004)

Personal information
- Date of birth: 30 October 1923
- Date of death: October 2004 (aged 80–81)
- Position: Forward

Senior career*
Years	Team	Apps	(Gls)
1946–1957	Rot-Weiss Essen	67	(33)
- * Club domestic league appearances and goals

Fritz Abromeit (30 October 1923 – October 2004) was a former German footballer.

For the entirety of his career Abromeit played with Rot-Weiss Essen, an eleven-year spell between 1946 and 1957. Overall, he played 67 games in the German Oberliga (which was the predecessor of Bundesliga as First Division) scoring 33 goals. He played in the 1953 German Cup final for the red-and-whites, which they won against Alemannia Aachen in Düsseldorf. He also won the national league championship with the side in 1955, beating Kaiserslautern by a score of 4–3.
