= Heinz Baas =

German footballer and manager

Personal information
- Full name: Heinrich Baas
- Date of birth: 13 April 1922
- Place of birth: Germany
- Date of death: 6 December 1994 (aged 72)
- Position: Midfielder

Senior career*
Years	Team	Apps	(Gls)
1945–1946	Duisburger SV		
1946–1949	Eintracht Frankfurt		
1949–1953	Kickers Offenbach		
1953–1954	SV Darmstadt 98		

Managerial career
- 1959–1966: 1. FSV Mainz 05
- 1966–1968: FSV Frankfurt
- 1969–1971: KSV Hessen Kassel
- 1971–1973: Karlsruher SC
- 1973–1974: KSV Hessen Kassel
- 1974–1975: SV Wiesbaden
- 1978–1979: SC Freiburg
- 1979–1980: SV Sandhausen
- * Club domestic league appearances and goals

Heinrich "Heinz" Baas (13 April 1922 – 6 December 1994) was a German football player and manager.

Baas began his career with Duisburger SV in 1945, and went on to play for Eintracht Frankfurt, Kickers Offenbach and SV Darmstadt 98. As a manager, he was in charge of 1. FSV Mainz 05, KSV Hessen Kassel and Karlsruher SC in the Regionalliga divisions, and also managed SC Freiburg in the 2. Bundesliga Süd.
