= Rudolf de la Vigne =

German footballer (1920–2004)

Personal information
- Date of birth: December 23, 1920
- Date of death: 2004 (aged 83–84)
- Position: Outside forward

Rudolf de la Vigne (23 December 1920 in Česká Lípa – January 2004) was a German footballer. He holds the record for having made the most appearances for VfR Mannheim in the Oberliga Süd, with whom he won the German championship in 1949.

== War and imprisonment ==
De la Vigne, whose family name comes from his Huguenot heritage, grew up in the Sudetenland and spent his youth years playing for Deutschen Sportverein Böhmisch-Leipa, a club which, at that time, was based in nearby Nový Bor (which was annexed from Czechoslovakia in September 1938 as part of the Munich Agreement). He agreed to sign for Warnsdorfer FK, champions of the newly created Gauliga Sudetenland who had already qualified for the final round of the German Championship, for the 1938–39 season, but he could not prevent the club from losing their four preliminary group matches against Dresdner SC and Schweinfurt 05.

Following the outbreak of war in 1938, aged 18 or 19, de la Vigne was called up to the Wehrmacht and joined the Fallschirmjäger, however was captured in May 1940 and held captive in Rotterdam until the end of the Battle of France. He was then moved to Canada, where he was held as a Prisoner of War in the British-controlled Camp 133 internment camp. There he met a group of Mannheim footballers; Henninger, Jöckel, Langlotz, Müller and Senck, who were all captured fighting in North Africa. Here he gained the nickname "Bella", which would stay with him throughout his career. In February 1946, after six years in Camp 133, de la Vigne was released in the north of Germany, at the Munster Training Area, which was under British control. A return to the Czech Sudetenland was, for a German, undesirable, given the intense animosity as a result of the annexation of Czechoslovakia, and for de la Vigne was neither personally attractive as his family no longer lived there. This led de la Vigne to move north to Mannheim, of which over 80% had been destroyed during the War, where he was reunited with those footballers he was imprisoned with in Canada. As he joined VfR Mannheim, the team gained the nickname "The Canadians."

== Return to football ==
VfR Mannheim competed in the Oberliga Süd from the 1945–46 season until the formation of the Bundesliga in 1962 (See History of German football#The Formation of the Bundesliga), and de la Vigne was one of the few players to make his professional debut at the highest level aged 26. He played his first game on 1 June 1947, in the 33rd match of the season – a derby match against local rivals SV Waldhof Mannheim – but could not prevent the team losing 3–0. He did not wait long for his first victory, however, which came 14 days later in another derby – this time a 3–1 win against VfL Neckarau.

On paper, de la Vigne was a striker, but he operated more as a playmaker than a target man and was known for having good technique, and his playing style was described as having an "aesthetic" quality. Until 1948, Mannheim did not perform outstandingly in their league – they finished in 14th 12th and 8th place in the years prior – but in de la Vigne's first full season with the club, 1948–49, he finished fifth in the goalscorers rankings, with 21 goals.
