= Wilhelm Goerges =

German teacher and sportsman

- Born: Wilhelm Karl Philipp Theodor Görges; 1838; Germany
- Died: 1925 (aged 86–87)
- Citizenship: German
- Occupations: Teacher; Sportsman
- Known for: Introduced football to Germany in 1875

Wilhelm Karl Philipp Theodor Goerges (1838 – 1925) was a German teacher and sportsman who, along with Richard Twopeny, introduced the game of association football to Germany in 1875.

== Biography ==
Born in 1838, Goerges grew up to become a teacher Johanneum Lüneburg, currently the oldest and most traditional of the still-existing high schools of Lüneburg. He died in 1925, at the age of either 86 or 87.

== Sporting career ==
Goerges was introduced to football in 1861, while he was studying in Lancy in Switzerland.

In August 1875, Goerges and the young Australian-born student Richard Twopeny, who came from Marlborough College, introduced the game of football to Johanneum. They organized several games between the students of the Johanneum school, many of whom are documented, the first of which being reported in both the Lüneburg advertisements and the English weekly The Field, the farm, the garden. The country gentleman's newspaper in September 1875. This took place only a year after the first documented football match in Germany, which had been organized in a school in Braunschweig by his fellow German teachers Konrad Koch and August Hermann, with the former even publishing the first German version of the rules of football in 1875; however, they were still based on the variant known today as Rugby football. Therefore, the efforts of Goerges and Twopeny were actually the first documented evidence of a football game according to the rules of the English FA. However, the club that Goerges founded at the Johanneum, the so-called Lüneburg College FC, only existed for a short time and then fell into oblivion.

== Legacy ==
It was not until the mid-2010s, more than 140 years later, that Goerges' footballing efforts in Johanneum were discovered in The Field by football historian Hans-Peter Hock, who then went through the Lüneburg newspapers of that time, where he found more match reports and contemporary sources that confirmed the beginnings of the Lüneburg College Football Club. In February 2017, Dr. Ingmar Probst and the students of his senior class were able to prove that Lüneburg College FC was from the Johanneum school because the names who appeared in those match reports were mostly students at the Johanneum at that time.

For well over a century, the history of German football was widely believed to have started with Konrad Koch in Braunschweig, so the people from there were naturally not very enthusiastic about the news of this discovery, nor about the implication that the football introduced by Koch was rugby. In 2020, Braunschweig's Stadtmarketing GmbH stated for the TV station NDR that "if Lüneburg was indeed the first place where a football game was played according to modern English rules, we are pleased about this and it is further proof of how progressive the teachers in northern Germany were in dealing with the then new subject of ball sports". While Braunschweig honored Koch with a memorial plaque and a sports facility named after him, Lüneburg was slow to respond due to financial issues and has not yet held anything in commemoration of Goerges.

== Bibliography ==
- Hock, Hans-Peter (2016). Der Dresden Football Club und die Anfänge des Fußballs in Europa [The Dresden Football Club and the beginnings of football in Europe] (in German). Hildesheim: Arete-Verlag. p. 112. ISBN 978-3-942468-69-5.
