= SC Opel Rüsselsheim =

German football club

- Full name: Sportclub Opel 06 Rüsselsheim e.V.
- Founded: 12 August 1906
- Ground: Stadion am Sommerdamm
- Capacity: 8,000
- Chairman: Peter Grimm
- Manager: Reinhold Wurmlinger
- League: Kreisoberliga Darmstadt/Gross-Gerau (VIII)
Home colours	Away colours

The SC Opel Rüsselsheim is a German association football club from the city of Rüsselsheim, Hesse.

Apart from its association with the company Opel, the club's most notable achievement has been playing in Germany's second division from 1965 to 1972.

== History ==
The club was formed on 12 August 1906 as SC Borussia 06 Rüsselsheim. In the 1920s, the club merged with a local gymnastics club, the Turngesellschaft and took its current name in reference to the fact that many of its members were employed at the local Opel factory. However, the club was never directly connected with or dependent on the company.

In 1932, the club took out its first local second-division championship, beating FSV Mainz 05 but it took until 1935 to earn promotion to the first division in the region, the Gauliga Südwest/Mainhessen. SC Opel spent five seasons in this league until the collapse of Nazi Germany in 1945, mostly as an elevator team.

After the end of the Second World War, the club became part of the tier-two Landesliga Hessen, which was then staged in two regional groups. Upon the merger of the two leagues into one in 1947, the club had to step down one level. SC Opel managed to return to Hesses highest league, which was now the tier-three Amateurliga Hessen, in 1950. The club stayed at this level until 1954, when it was relegated once more.

After a decade in the lower levels of amateur football, the club experienced a revival in 1964, earning promotion back to the Amateurliga. In this league, it won the championship convincingly, beating second placed Westend Frankfurt by eleven points. The champions of Hesse, alongside the Bavarian champions, were directly promoted to the Regionalliga Süd, one of Germany's regional second division below the Fußball-Bundesliga at this stage. The club also qualified for the DFB-Pokal 1965–66 where it lost to Borussia Mönchengladbach 1–5 in a qualification round. The club was then mostly listed as SC Rüsselsheim as it was seen as illegal advertising to carry a sponsors name in its title.

Despite support from Opel, the club was always financially struggling at this level, never drawing sufficient attendances for this level of play. A tenth place in the first of seven second-division seasons remained the best result archived in this era. In 1972, relegation ended the club's time in the Regionalliga and almost also its existence; in debt with DM 500,000, the club was only saved from folding by an administrative error when applying for insolvency. The club played a good Amateurliga season in 1972–73 nevertheless, finishing third, but was relegated the year after.

SC Opel spent its next couple of season's stabilising its finances but declined rapidly on the field, dropping to the lower amateur levels. In the late 1980s, another attempt was made to rise through the ranks and in 1989, the Bezirksoberliga, the fifth tier, was reached but another financial collapse was only narrowly avoided.

In the new millennium, the club has stabilised itself financially as well as on the field, spending its time in the tier-seven Bezirksliga Darmstadt-West. In 2008, this league became the Kreisoberliga Darmstadt/Gross-Gerau. In 2010, the club suffered relegation to the tier nine Kreisliga A Gross-Gerau, where it played for two seasons. At the same time the club also came close to insolvency but was saved through a line of credit by members.

In 2012 the club won the league championship in the Kreisliga and returned to the Kreisoberliga Darmstadt/Gross-Gerau.

== Honours ==
The club's honours:

- Amateurliga Hessen (III)
  - Champions: 1965
- Kreisliga A Gross-Gerau (IX)
  - Champions: 2012

== Recent seasons ==
The recent season-by-season performance of the club:

Season	Division	Tier	Position
1999–2000	Bezirksliga Darmstadt-West	VII	
2000–01	Bezirksliga Darmstadt-West	VII	
2001–02	Bezirksliga Darmstadt-West	VII	
2002–03	Bezirksliga Darmstadt-West	VII	
2003–04	Bezirksliga Darmstadt-West	VII	
2004–05	Bezirksliga Darmstadt-West	VII	6th
2005–06	Bezirksliga Darmstadt-West	VII	9th
2006–07	Bezirksliga Darmstadt-West	VII	14th
2007–08	Bezirksliga Darmstadt-West	VII	10th
2008–09	Kreisoberliga Darmstadt/Gross-Gerau	VIII	14th
2009–10	Kreisoberliga Darmstadt/Gross-Gerau	VIII	14th ↓
2010–11	Kreisliga A Gross-Gerau	IX	2nd
2011–12	Kreisliga A Gross-Gerau	IX	1st ↑
2012–13	Kreisoberliga Darmstadt/Gross-Gerau	VIII	2nd
2013–14	Kreisoberliga Darmstadt/Gross-Gerau	VIII	7th
2014–15	Kreisoberliga Darmstadt/Gross-Gerau	VIII	8th
2015–16	Kreisoberliga Darmstadt/Gross-Gerau	VIII	13th
2016–17	Kreisoberliga Darmstadt/Gross-Gerau	VIII	

- With the introduction of the Regionalligas in 1994 and the 3. Liga in 2008 as the new third tier, below the 2. Bundesliga, all leagues below dropped one tier. Also in 2008, a large number of football leagues in Hesse were renamed, with the Oberliga Hessen becoming the Hessenliga, the Landesliga becoming the Verbandsliga, the Bezirksoberliga becoming the Gruppenliga and the Bezirksliga becoming the Kreisoberliga.

↑ Promoted	↓ Relegated
