= STV Horst-Emscher =

German football club

- Full name: Spiel- und Turnvereinigung Horst-Emscher e.V.
- Nickname: Husaren (Hussars)
- Founded: 1912; 114 years ago
- Dissolved: 2007; 19 years ago
- Ground: Fürstenbergstadion
- Capacity: 22,800
- League: defunct
Home colours	Away colours

STV Horst-Emscher was a German association football club from the city of Gelsenkirchen, North Rhine-Westphalia. The club's greatest success has been to qualify for the 1950 German football championship, where it was knocked out by SpVgg Fürth. Between 1947 and 1959 it spent eight seasons in the tier one Oberliga West. In 1967 the club also won the German amateur football championship. The club also made two appearances in the DFB-Pokal, the German Cup, in 1954–55 and 1988–89. STV folded in mid-season in 2007 because of financial trouble.

== History ==
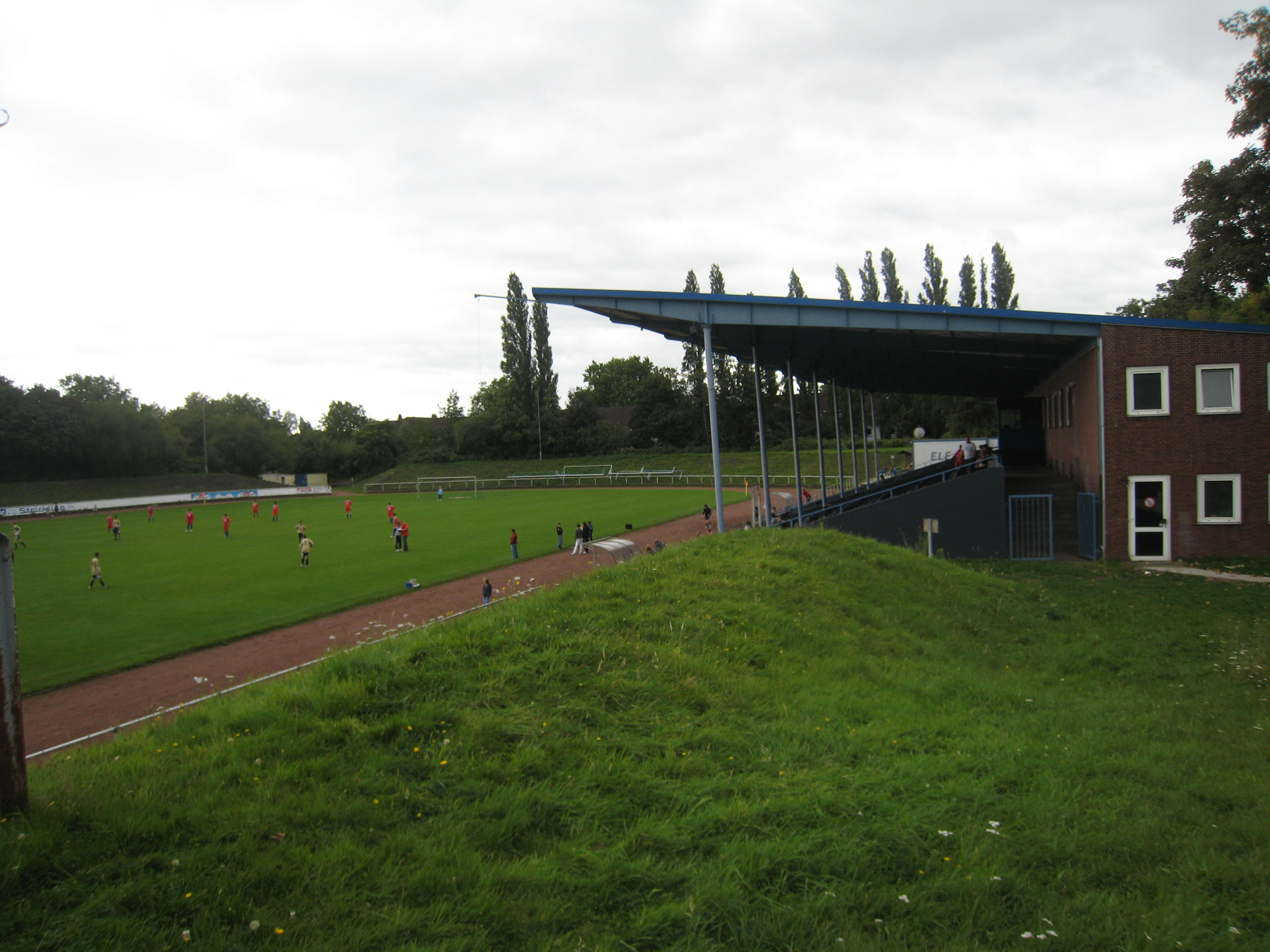
The Fürstenbergstadion, home ground of the former club

The club traces its history back to TG Horster Mark, a club formed in 1912, which merged eight years later with the TV Horst 1892 to form STV Horst-Emscher. The club was strongly associated with coal mining, as was Gelsenkirchen and the Ruhr area, and the local colliery Zeche Nordstern.

STV's most successful era came after the Second World War when it qualified for the new tier one Oberliga West in 1947. In the first three post-war seasons of the league from 1947 to 1950 STV Horst-Emscher out performed Gelsenkirchen's most successful club, FC Schalke 04, who had six German championships to its name at the time. STV finished third twice from 1947 to 1949 and fourth in 1949–50, in an era when Borussia Dortmund won three consecutive league championships. The club attracted a regular crowd of 25,000 in its Fürstenbergstadion during this era. In 1948 the club qualified for the British occupation zone championship but lost to FC St. Pauli in the quarter-finals. In 1950 it took part in the German championship but was knocked out 3–2 by SpVgg Fürth despite leading 2–0 at one stage.

After the successful 1949–50 season the club lost eight of its best players and consequently went into decline. Four more Oberliga seasons followed but by 1954 it was relegated to the second tier 2. Oberliga West. The club played in the 1954–55 DFB-Pokal, where it lost to 1. FC Köln in the first round. It returned for a season in 1958–59 but otherwise remained a second-tier side. A fourth place in 1962–63 qualified the club for the new Regionalliga West which replaced the 2. Oberliga in North Rhine-Westphalia as the second tier of the league system.

After three seasons at this level the club suffered relegation to the third tier for the first time, the Verbandsliga Westfalen in 1966, where it finished runners-up in the south west group in 1966–67. The latter qualified the club for the German amateur football championship where it defeated Hannover 96 Amateure 2–0 in the final to win the competition. One of the players in the team was Günter Thon, father of former German international Olaf Thon, who himself hailed from the youth department of the club. The club, now playing in the north east division of the Amateurliga Westfalen, won the league in 1971–72 but lost the Westphalia championship to south west league winners Sportfreunde Siegen.

After eight unsuccessful years of trying to return to the Regionalliga the club decided in 1973 to merge with local rival Eintracht Gelsenkirchen, which had been struggling financially but played in the Regionalliga, to form STV Eintracht Gelsenkirchen. The merger of the two former rivals was not a success, with the new club permanently dropping out of the second tier after the 1973–74 season. The club struggled in the Amateurliga as well and, in the 1977–78 season, STV missed the cut for the new Oberliga Westfalen. As most former Eintracht members had left the club by then it was named back to STV Horst-Emscher.

After two seasons in the fourth division Verbandsliga Westfalen STV won the league in 1979–80 and earned promotion to the Oberliga. After only two seasons the club was relegated back to the Verbandsliga. By now STV was struggling financially and played the next twelve seasons as a lower table side in the Verbandsliga, until relegated from there as well in 1994. In between, in 1988–89, it made its second appearance in the DFB-Pokal, losing 5–1 in the replay to Union Solingen after having drawn 0–0 in the first match at home.

STV returned to the Verbandsliga two years later, in 1996. At this point, DM 250,000 in debt, the club avoided insolvency by separating the football department under the new name of STV Horst-Emscher Husaren while the debt stayed with the mother club. STV nevertheless was in a downward spiral by then, suffering three consecutive relegations from 2005 to 2007 that took the side from the Verbandsliga to the Kreisliga A. In its last season, 2007–08, it was once more heavily in debt, owing DM 180,000 and consequently folded in mid-season. An attempt to rescue the club the same way as the previous time, by separating the football department as STV Horst once more however failed as the local football association refused it registration.

== Honours ==
The club's honours:

- German amateur football championship
  - Champions: 1966–67
- 2. Oberliga West
  - Champions: 1957–58
- Verbandsliga Westfalen
  - Champions: 1971–72, 1979–80

== Final seasons ==
The final season-by-season performance of the club:

Season	Division	Tier	Position
2000–01	Verbandsliga Gruppe 2	V	7th
2000–01	Verbandsliga Gruppe 2	V	11th
2001–02	Verbandsliga Gruppe 2	V	11th
2002–03	Verbandsliga Gruppe 2	V	10th
2003–04	Verbandsliga Gruppe 2	V	13th
2004–05	Verbandsliga Gruppe 2	V	16th ↓
2005–06	Landesliga Staffel 3	VI	16th ↓
2006–07	Bezirksliga Staffel 13	VII	15th ↓
2007–08	Kreisliga A	VIII	folded

- With the introduction of the Regionalligas in 1994 and the 3. Liga in 2008 as the new third tier, below the 2. Bundesliga, all leagues below dropped one tier.

↑ Promoted	↓ Relegated
