= Friedo Dörfel =

German footballer

Personal information
- Date of birth: 19 February 1915
- Date of death: 8 November 1980 (aged 65)
- Position: Forward

Senior career*
Years	Team	Apps	(Gls)
- Hamburger SV

International career
1942	Germany	2	(1)
- * Club domestic league appearances and goals

Friedo Dörfel (19 February 1915 – 8 November 1980) was a German international footballer.
