= SV Beuel 06 =

German football club

Sportverein Beuel 06
- Full name: SV Beuel 06 e.V.
- Founded: 1906
- Ground: Franz-Elbern-Stadion
- League: Bezirksliga (VII)
- 2015–16: Kreisliga A Bonn (VIII), 1st (promoted)
Home colours	Away colours

SV Beuel 06 is a German association football club that plays in Bonn, North Rhine-Westphalia.

== History ==
The club's origins are as a group of high school students who were playing football in an informal association as early as 1903. They were known briefly as the Rapiditas or Rapidas after a Rotterdam side that was in the city to play a match against Bonn FV. By the summer of 1906 they had taken the name Beueler FV, while in the eastern part of the town another club of the same name appeared. Both sides came close to collapse by the end of World War I and so merged. Soon after another club, FV Alemannia 1919 Beuel, came onto the scene, and in 1924 Alemannia and FV merged to form SV Beuel 06.

German football was re-organized under the Third Reich in 1933 and sixteen new top flight divisions were formed. SV earned a place in the Gauliga Mittelrhein in the 1936–37 season and inaugurated their new stadium that same year. The following season Beuel won a disputed championship in the division, but missed an opportunity to play in the national final rounds. By the time a protest by the club had been decided in their favour, second-place finisher Alemannia Aachen had already played its first playoff match.

After World War II the club resumed play in the amateur Rheinbezirksliga, which would become the Landesliga Mittelrhein (III), but by the mid 50s had fallen to fourth division play. Beuel played IV and V tier football over the next several decades, and while they enjoyed some success in capturing a number of titles, they were unable to advance in the promotion rounds.

Finally, in 1997, SV clawed its way to the Landesliga Mittelrhein, Gruppe 1 (IV), where the team earned a second-place result, only just failing to capture the title on the last day of the season. The club's adventure then ended in financial collapse and they were sent down to the Kreisliga (VI). Since then the club has been fluctuating between the Bezirksliga and the Kreisliga A, playing in the former again after promotion in 2016.

== Stadium ==
The club plays its home games in the Franz-Elbern-Stadion in Beuel.

== Famous players ==
- Franz Elbern, eight caps for Germany 1935–38
