= 2016 DFB-Pokal final =

- Match programme cover
- Event: 2015–16 DFB-Pokal
| Bayern Munich | Borussia Dortmund |
| 0 | 0 |
- After extra time Bayern Munich won 4–3 on penalties
- Date: 21 May 2016
- Venue: Olympiastadion, Berlin
- Man of the Match: Arturo Vidal (Bayern Munich)
- Referee: Marco Fritz (Korb)
- Attendance: 74,322
- Weather: Clear; 22 °C (72 °F); 35% humidity

The 2016 DFB-Pokal final decided the winner of the 2015–16 DFB-Pokal, the 73rd season of Germany's premier knockout football cup competition. It was played on 21 May 2016 at the Olympiastadion in Berlin.

Borussia Dortmund, who had lost in the two previous finals, faced Bayern Munich, the record title-holders. Bayern won 4–3 on penalties, as the match had finished 0–0 after extra time, giving Bayern their 18th title.

With the win, Bayern completed the domestic double, and therefore played away to 2015–16 Bundesliga runners-up Dortmund in the 2016 DFL-Supercup on 14 August 2016. Because Bayern had already qualified for the Champions League, the sixth-placed team in the Bundesliga, Mainz 05, earned automatic qualification for the group stage of next year's edition of the UEFA Europa League, and the league's third qualifying round spot went to the team in seventh, Hertha BSC.

== Background ==
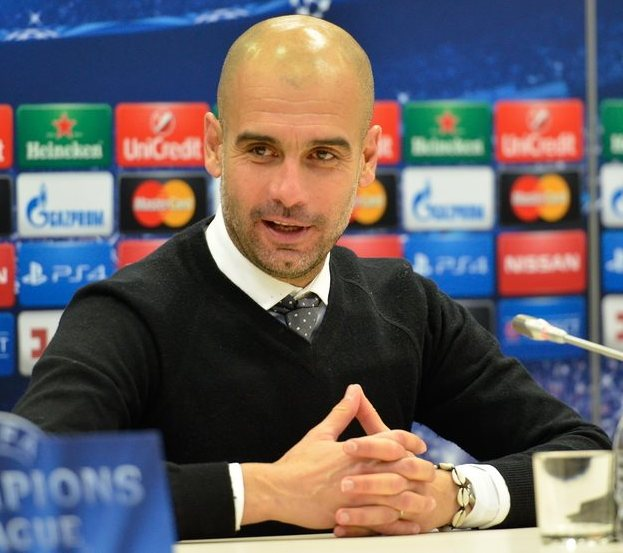
This was Pep Guardiola's final match coaching Bayern.

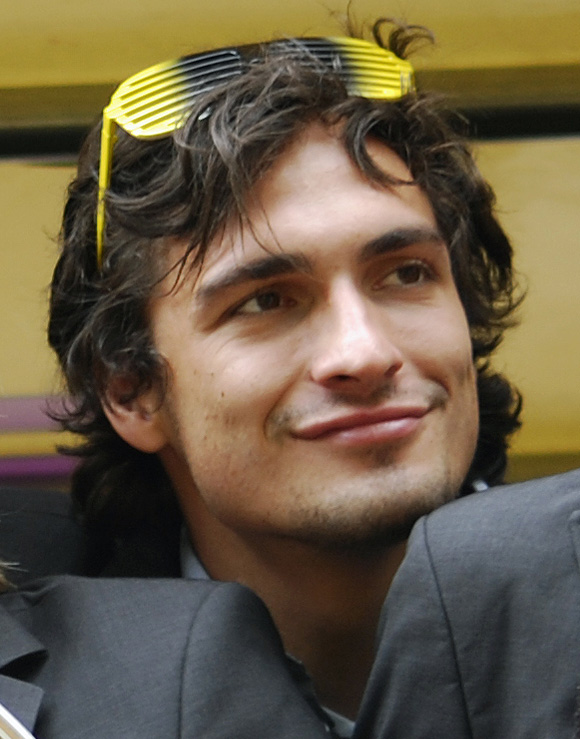
This was Mats Hummels' final match for Dortmund before moving to Bayern for the following season.

It was Bayern's 21st final, with a record of seventeen wins, the most of any club, and three losses prior. Bayern's last final won was in 2014. It was Dortmund's eighth overall and third consecutive final, with a record of three wins and four losses prior. Dortmund's last final won was in 2012. This was the ninth match between Bayern and Dortmund in the DFB-Pokal, and the fourth final between them, all within the last eight years, having previously met in 2008, 2012, and 2014, making it the most common final. Of these, Bayern had won two (in 2008, winning 2–1 after extra time, and 2014, winning 2–0 after extra time), while Dortmund had won once (in 2012, winning 5–2).

Bayern and Dortmund also met each other in the semi-finals of the previous season of the DFB-Pokal. The match finished 1–1 after extra time, and Dortmund won 2–0 on penalties. The other matches between these two sides took place in 1966, where Bayern won 2–0 in the qualification round, 1981, where Bayern won 4–0 in the third round, 1992, where Dortmund won 5–4 on penalties in the second round as the match finished 2–2 after extra time, and 2013, where Bayern won 1–0 in the quarter-finals. This made for a total of five wins for Bayern, and one win along with two penalty shoot-out victories for Dortmund.

The final was Pep Guardiola's last match as head coach of Bayern, after three years in charge of the team. Guardiola would go on to replace Manuel Pellegrini at Manchester City. For Dortmund manager Thomas Tuchel, it was his first season in charge as coach. Guardiola praised Tuchel for an impressive season, finishing second in the Bundesliga and making it to the cup final.

On 10 May 2016, it was announced that Dortmund defender Mats Hummels would be leaving the club at the end of the season. The cup final would be his last match for Dortmund, against his future club Bayern, whom he signed a five-year contract with, starting 1 July 2016. Hummels himself was a Bayern youth product, but he only made one senior appearance before moving to Dortmund in 2008, initially on loan. The transfer to Bayern was received negatively by many Dortmund fans, as he was the third Dortmund player to move to Bayern since 2013.

== Route to the final ==
The DFB-Pokal began with 64 teams in a single-elimination knockout cup competition. There were a total of five rounds leading up to the final. Teams were drawn against each other, and the winner after 90 minutes advanced. If still tied, 30 minutes of extra time were played. If the score was still level, a penalty shoot-out was used to determine the winner.

Note: In all results below, the score of the finalist is given first (H: home; A: away).

| Bayern Munich | | Round | Borussia Dortmund | |
|---|---|---|---|---|
| Opponent | Result | 2015–16 DFB-Pokal | Opponent | Result |
| FC Nöttingen (A) | 3–1 | First round | Chemnitzer FC (A) | 2–0 |
| VfL Wolfsburg (A) | 3–1 | Second round | SC Paderborn (H) | 7–1 |
| Darmstadt 98 (H) | 1–0 | Round of 16 | FC Augsburg (A) | 2–0 |
| VfL Bochum (A) | 3–0 | Quarter-finals | VfB Stuttgart (A) | 3–1 |
| Werder Bremen (H) | 2–0 | Semi-finals | Hertha BSC (A) | 3–0 |

== Match ==
=== Details ===
21 May 2016
20:00 CEST

| Bayern Munich | 0–0 (a.e.t.) | Borussia Dortmund |
|---|---|---|
| | Report |
Penalties
| Vidal (penalty scored); Lewandowski (penalty scored); Kimmich (penalty missed); Müller (penalty scored); Douglas Costa (penalty scored) | 4–3 | (penalty scored) Kagawa; (penalty missed) Bender; (penalty missed) Papastathopoulos; (penalty scored) Aubameyang; (penalty scored) Reus |

Olympiastadion, Berlin
Attendance: 74,322
Referee: Marco Fritz (Korb)

| Bayern Munich | Borussia Dortmund |

| GK | 1 | (Germany) Manuel Neuer |
| RB | 21 | (Germany) Philipp Lahm (c) |
| CB | 32 | (Germany) Joshua Kimmich | (yellow card) 42' |
| CB | 17 | (Germany) Jérôme Boateng |
| LB | 27 | (Austria) David Alaba |
| DM | 23 | (Chile) Arturo Vidal | (yellow card) 47' |
| RM | 11 | (Brazil) Douglas Costa |
| CM | 25 | (Germany) Thomas Müller | (yellow card) 109' |
| CM | 6 | (Spain) Thiago |
| LM | 7 | (France) Franck Ribéry | (yellow card) 39' | (substituted off) 108' |
| CF | 9 | (Poland) Robert Lewandowski |
Substitutes:
| GK | 26 | (Germany) Sven Ulreich |
| DF | 5 | (Morocco) Medhi Benatia |
| DF | 13 | (Brazil) Rafinha |
| DF | 18 | (Spain) Juan Bernat |
| MF | 14 | (Spain) Xabi Alonso |
| MF | 20 | (Germany) Sebastian Rode |
| FW | 29 | (France) Kingsley Coman | | (substituted on) 108' |
Manager:
(Spain) Pep Guardiola

| GK | 38 | (Switzerland) Roman Bürki |
| CB | 25 | (Greece) Sokratis Papastathopoulos | (yellow card) 99' |
| CB | 6 | (Germany) Sven Bender |
| CB | 15 | (Germany) Mats Hummels (c) | (yellow card) 74' | (substituted off) 78' |
| RM | 26 | (Poland) Łukasz Piszczek |
| CM | 27 | (Germany) Gonzalo Castro | (yellow card) 39' | (substituted off) 106' |
| CM | 33 | (Germany) Julian Weigl |
| LM | 29 | (Germany) Marcel Schmelzer | | (substituted off) 70' |
| RW | 10 | (Armenia) Henrikh Mkhitaryan |
| CF | 17 | (Gabon) Pierre-Emerick Aubameyang |
| LW | 11 | (Germany) Marco Reus |
Substitutes:
| GK | 1 | (Germany) Roman Weidenfeller |
| DF | 28 | (Germany) Matthias Ginter | | (substituted on) 78' |
| DF | 37 | (Germany) Erik Durm | | (substituted on) 70' |
| MF | 18 | (Turkey) Nuri Şahin |
| MF | 22 | (United States) Christian Pulisic |
| MF | 23 | (Japan) Shinji Kagawa | | (substituted on) 106' |
| FW | 20 | (Colombia) Adrián Ramos |
Manager:
(Germany) Thomas Tuchel

Man of the Match:
Arturo Vidal (Bayern Munich)

Assistant referees:
Dominik Schaal (Tübingen)
Marcel Pelgrim (Hamminkeln-Loikum)
Fourth official:
Bastian Dankert (Rostock)

Match rules

- 90 minutes.
- 30 minutes of extra time if necessary.
- Penalty shoot-out if scores still level.
- Seven named substitutes, of which up to three may be used.

=== Statistics ===
| Statistic | Bayern Munich | Borussia Dortmund |
|---|---|---|
| Goals scored | 0 | 0 |
| Total shots | 17 | 9 |
| Shots on target | 3 | 1 |
| Saves | 1 | 3 |
| Ball possession | 70% | 30% |
| Corner kicks | 7 | 4 |
| Fouls committed | 18 | 17 |
| Offsides | 4 | 3 |
| Yellow cards | 4 | 3 |
| Red cards | 0 | 0 |
