= FC Bayern Munich =

Association football club in Germany

Coordinates: 48°6′7″N 11°34′22″E

Bayern Munich
- Full name: Fußball-Club Bayern München e.V.
- Nicknames: Die Bayern (The Bavarians); Stern des Südens (Star of the South); Die Roten (The Reds); FC Hollywood
- Short name: Bayern München; Bayern Munich; FC Bayern; Bayern; FCB
- Founded: 27 February 1900; 126 years ago
- Stadium: Allianz Arena
- Capacity: 75,024
- President: Herbert Hainer
- CEO: Jan-Christian Dreesen
- Head coach: Vincent Kompany
- League: Bundesliga
- 2025–26: Bundesliga, 1st of 18 (champions)
- Website: fcbayern.com
Home colours	Away colours	Third colours

Fußball-Club Bayern München e. V. (FCB, German: [ˈfuːsbalˌklʊp ˈbaɪɐn ˈmʏnçn̩]), commonly known as Bayern Munich (German: Bayern München), FC Bayern (German: [ˌɛft͡seː ˈbaɪɐn]) or simply Bayern, is a professional sports club based in Munich, Germany. They are most known for their men's professional football team, who play in the Bundesliga, the top tier of the German football league system. Bayern are the most successful club in German football and are among the world's most decorated, having won a record 35 national titles, including eleven consecutive titles from 2013 to 2023 and a record 21 national cups, the DFB-Pokal, alongside one of the highest number of top European titles.

Bayern Munich was founded in 1900 by eleven players, led by Franz John. Although Bayern won its first national championship in 1932, the club was not selected for the Bundesliga during its inception in 1963. The club found success in the mid/late-1960s, but the pinnacle came in the 1970s under the captaincy of Franz Beckenbauer, as they won the European Cup three consecutive times (from 1974 to 1976). Overall, Bayern have won six European Cup/UEFA Champions League titles (a German record), winning their sixth title in the 2020 final as part of the continental treble of Bundesliga, DFB Pokal and UEFA Champions League, becoming the second European club to achieve this feat twice. Furthermore, the club is one of five teams that have earned the right to keep the trophy and to wear a multiple-winner badge. The club has reached the final of the European Cup/UEFA Champions League 11 times, a joint second-most of any club in the history of the competition and is also second placed in numbers of semi-final appearances with 22.

Bayern has also won one UEFA Cup, one European Cup Winners' Cup, two UEFA Super Cup, two FIFA Club World Cup and two Intercontinental Cup titles, making it one of the most successful European clubs internationally and the only German club to have won both international titles, as well one of five clubs to have won all three original main UEFA club competitions. Bayern players have accumulated six Ballon d'Or awards with multiple players coming in the second position in the award, two The Best FIFA Men's Player awards, six European Golden Shoe and three UEFA Men's Player of the Year awards, including UEFA Club Footballer of the Year. The club had at least one player in eleven consecutive FIFA World Cup finals from 1986 to 2022.

By winning the 2020 FIFA Club World Cup, Bayern Munich became only the second club to win the "sextuple" (winning the League, Cup, and Champions League in one season followed by the Domestic Supercup, UEFA Supercup and Club World Cup in the next season), or all trophies that a club can win in a calendar year. The club has traditional local rivalries with 1860 Munich and 1. FC Nürnberg. The rivalry it has with Borussia Dortmund is known as Der Klassiker.

Bayern Munich is one of the most widely supported football clubs in the world, and in November 2026, Bayern had more than 500,000 official club members, and 4,907 officially registered fan clubs, with over 348,190 members, making the club the largest sports club in the world by membership. The club has other departments for chess, handball, basketball, gymnastics, bowling, table tennis and senior football, with more than 1,500 active members. Since the beginning of the 2005–06 season, Bayern has played its home games at the Allianz Arena. Previously, the team had played at Munich's Olympiastadion for 33 years. The team colours are red and white, and the crest shows the white and blue flag of Bavaria. Bayern Munich has the largest revenue out of any German sports club and is one of the highest-earning football clubs in the world. Bayern earned a record breaking €988.2 million in the 2025–26 season.

== History ==
=== Early years (1900s–1960s) ===
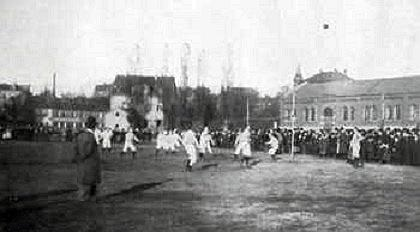
The first game of Bayern Munich against 1. FC Nürnberg in 1901

Bayern Munich was founded by members of a Munich gymnastics club (MTV 1879). When a congregation of members of MTV 1879 decided on 27 February 1900 that the footballers of the club would not be allowed to join the German Football Association (DFB), eleven members of the football division left the congregation and on the same evening founded Fußball-Club Bayern München. Within a few months, Bayern achieved high-scoring victories against all local rivals, including a 15–0 win against Nordstern, and reached the semi-finals of the 1900–01 South German championship.

In the following years, the club won some local trophies, and, in 1910–11, Bayern joined the newly founded "Kreisliga", the first regional Bavarian league. The club won this league in its first year, but did not win it again until the beginning of the First World War in 1914, which halted all football activities in Germany. By the end of its first decade of founding, Bayern had its first German national team player, Max Gablonsky. By 1920, it had over 700 members, making it the largest football club in Munich.

In the years after the war, Bayern won several regional competitions before winning its first South German championship in 1926, an achievement repeated two years later. Its first national title was gained in 1932, when coach Richard "Little Dombi" Kohn led the team to the German championship by defeating Eintracht Frankfurt 2–0 in the final.

The rise of Adolf Hitler to power put an abrupt end to Bayern's development. Club president Kurt Landauer and the coach, both of whom were Jewish, left the country. Many others in the club were also purged. Bayern was taunted as the "Jew's club", while local rival 1860 Munich gained much support. After a friendly match in Switzerland, some Bayern players greeted Landauer, who was a spectator, and the club was subject to continued discrimination. Despite these associations, club president Josef Kellner (1938-45) was an NSDAP member and administrator in the Sudetenland. Bayern was also affected by the ruling that football players had to be full amateurs again, which led to the move of gifted young centre-forward Oskar Rohr to Switzerland. In the following years, Bayern could not sustain its role of contender for the national title, achieving mid-table results in its regional league instead.

After the end of the Second World War in 1945, Bayern became a member of the Oberliga Süd, the southern conference of the German first division, which was split five ways at that time. Bayern struggled, hiring and firing 13 coaches between 1945 and 1963. Landauer returned from exile in 1947, and was once again appointed club president, the tenure lasted until 1951. He remains as the club's president with the longest accumulated tenure. Landauer has been deemed the most important figure in Bayern's transition to a professional club. In 1955, the club was relegated but returned to the Oberliga in the following season and won the DFB-Pokal for the first time, beating Fortuna Düsseldorf 1–0 in the final.

The club struggled financially, though, verging on bankruptcy at the end of the 1950s. President Reitlinger was ousted in the club's elections of 1958 by the industrialist Roland Endler, who provided financial stability for the club. Under his reign, Bayern had its best years in the Oberliga. Endler was no longer a candidate in 1962, when Wilhelm Neudecker, who became wealthy in the postwar construction boom, replaced him.

In 1963, the Oberligas in Germany were consolidated into one national league, the Bundesliga. Five teams from the Oberliga South were admitted. The key to qualifying for the Bundesliga was the accumulated record of the last twelve years, where Bayern was only the sixth-ranked club. To boot, local rivals 1860 Munich, ranked seventh, were champions of the last Oberliga-Süd season and were given preference on the basis of this achievement. After initial protests by Bayern for alleged mistreatment remained fruitless, president Neudecker rose to the challenge and hired Zlatko Čajkovski, who in 1962 led 1. FC Köln to the national championship. Fielding a team with young players like Franz Beckenbauer, Gerd Müller and Sepp Maier – who would later be collectively referred to as the axis, they achieved promotion to the Bundesliga in 1965.

=== The golden years (1960s–1970s) ===
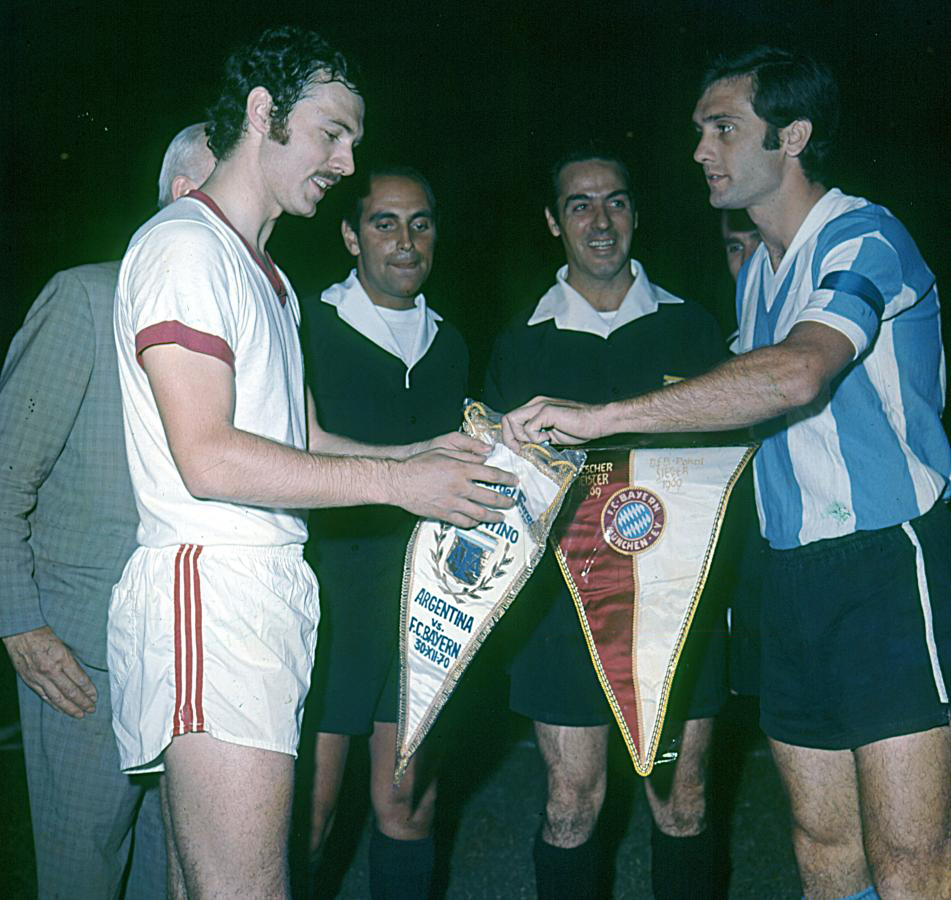
Franz Beckenbauer and Roberto Perfumo before a friendly v Argentina in 1970

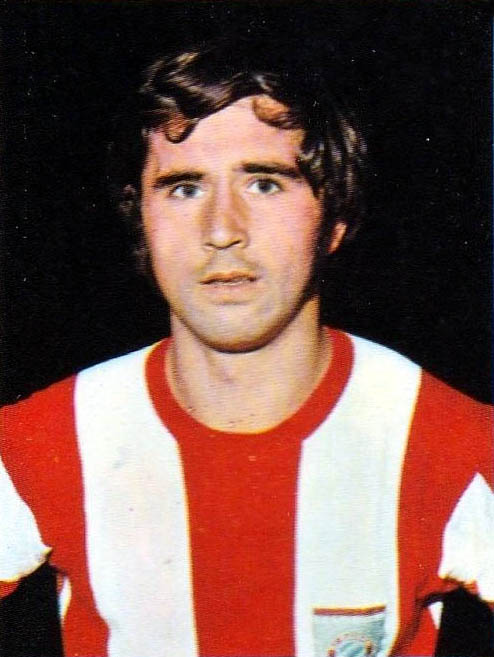
Gerd Müller displayed on a 1973 football card

In their first Bundesliga season, Bayern finished third and also won the DFB-Pokal. This qualified them for the following year's European Cup Winners' Cup, which they won in the final against Scottish club Rangers, Franz Roth scoring the decider in a 1–0 extra time victory. In 1967, Bayern retained the DFB-Pokal, but slow overall progress saw Branko Zebec take over as coach. He replaced Bayern's offensive style of play with a more disciplined approach, and in doing so achieved the first league and cup double in Bundesliga history in 1969. Bayern Munich are one of five German clubs to win the Bundesliga and DFB-Pokal in the same season along with Borussia Dortmund, 1. FC Köln, Werder Bremen and Bayer Leverkusen. Zebec used only 13 players throughout the season.

Udo Lattek took charge in 1970. After winning the DFB-Pokal in his first season, Lattek led Bayern to their third German championship. The deciding match in the 1971–72 season against Schalke 04 was the first match in the new Olympiastadion, and was also the first live televised match in Bundesliga history. Bayern beat Schalke 5–1, so won the title, while also setting several records, including points gained and goals scored. Bayern also won the next two championships, but the zenith was their triumph in the 1974 European Cup Final against Atlético Madrid, which Bayern won 4–0 after a replay. This title – after winning the Cup Winners' trophy 1967 and two semi-finals (1968 and 1972) in that competition – marked the club's breakthrough as a force on the international stage.

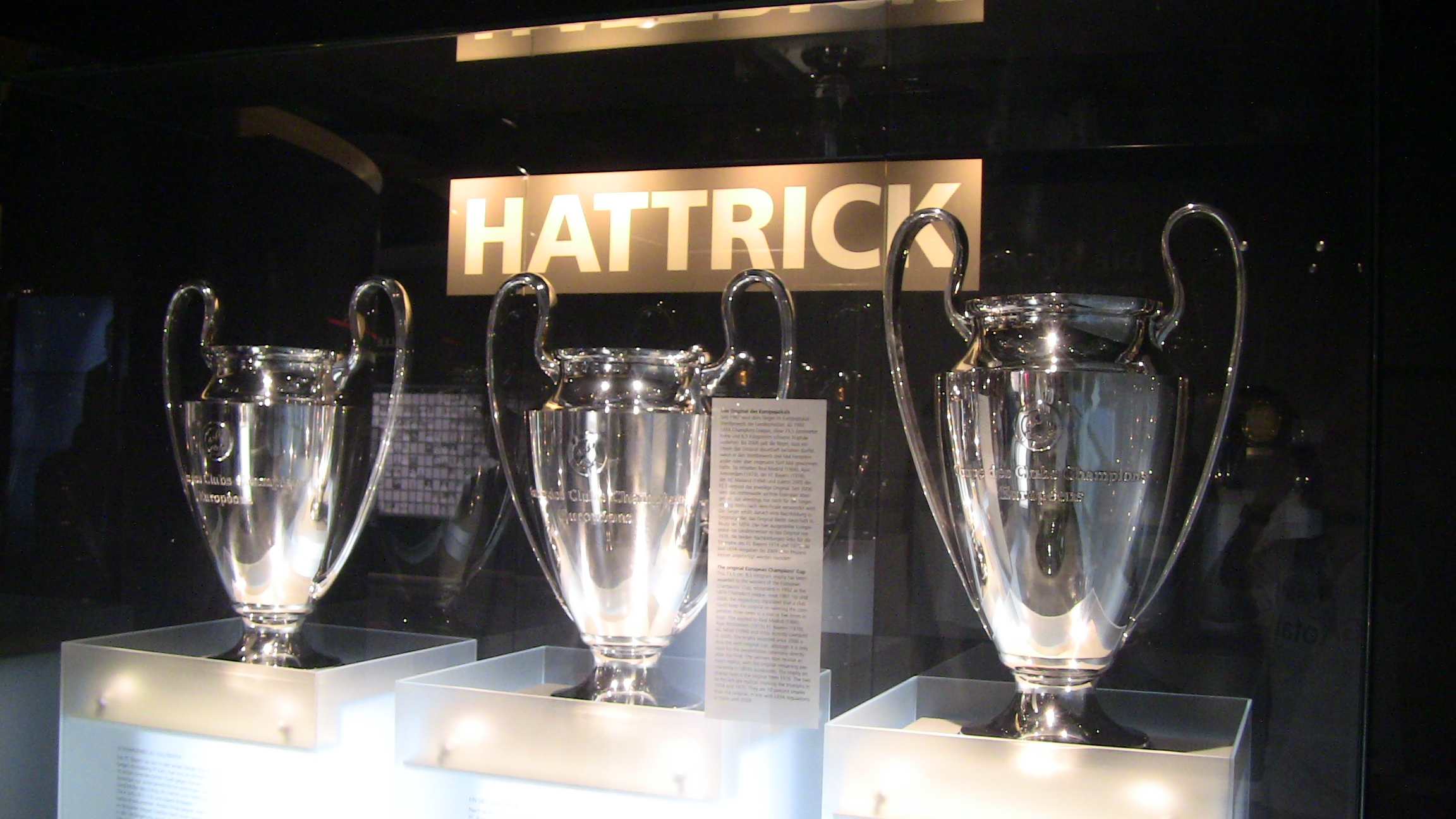
The three consecutive European Cup trophies won by Bayern Munich from 1974 to 1976. The one on the far right is the real trophy, given to Bayern permanently. The ones on the left are slightly smaller replicas.

1974 European Cup final starting lineup

During the following years, the team was unsuccessful domestically, but defended their European title by defeating Leeds United in the 1975 European Cup final, when Roth and Müller secured victory with late goals. "We came back into the game and scored two lucky goals, so in the end, we were the winners, but we were very, very lucky", stated Franz Beckenbauer. Billy Bremner believed the French referee was "very suspicious". Leeds fans then rioted in Paris and were banned from European football for three years.

In 1976, at the final in Glasgow, another Roth goal helped defeat Saint-Étienne, and Bayern became the third club to win the trophy in three consecutive years. The final trophy won by Bayern in this era was the Intercontinental Cup, in which they defeated Brazilian club Cruzeiro over two legs. The rest of the decade was a time of change and saw no further titles for Bayern. In 1977, Franz Beckenbauer left for New York Cosmos and, in 1979, Sepp Maier and Uli Hoeneß retired while Gerd Müller joined the Fort Lauderdale Strikers. Bayerndusel was coined during this period as an expression of either contempt or envy about the sometimes narrow and last-minute wins against other teams.

=== From FC Breitnigge to FC Hollywood (1970s–1990s) ===
The 1980s were a period of off-field turmoil for Bayern, with many changes in personnel and financial problems. On the field, Paul Breitner and Karl-Heinz Rummenigge, termed "FC Breitnigge", led the team to Bundesliga titles in 1980 and 1981. Apart from a DFB-Pokal win in 1982, two relatively unsuccessful seasons followed, after which Breitner retired, and former coach Udo Lattek returned. Bayern won the DFB-Pokal in 1984 and went on to win five Bundesliga championships in six seasons, including a double in 1986. European success, however, was elusive during the decade; Bayern, though, finished as runner-up in the European Cups of 1982 and 1987.

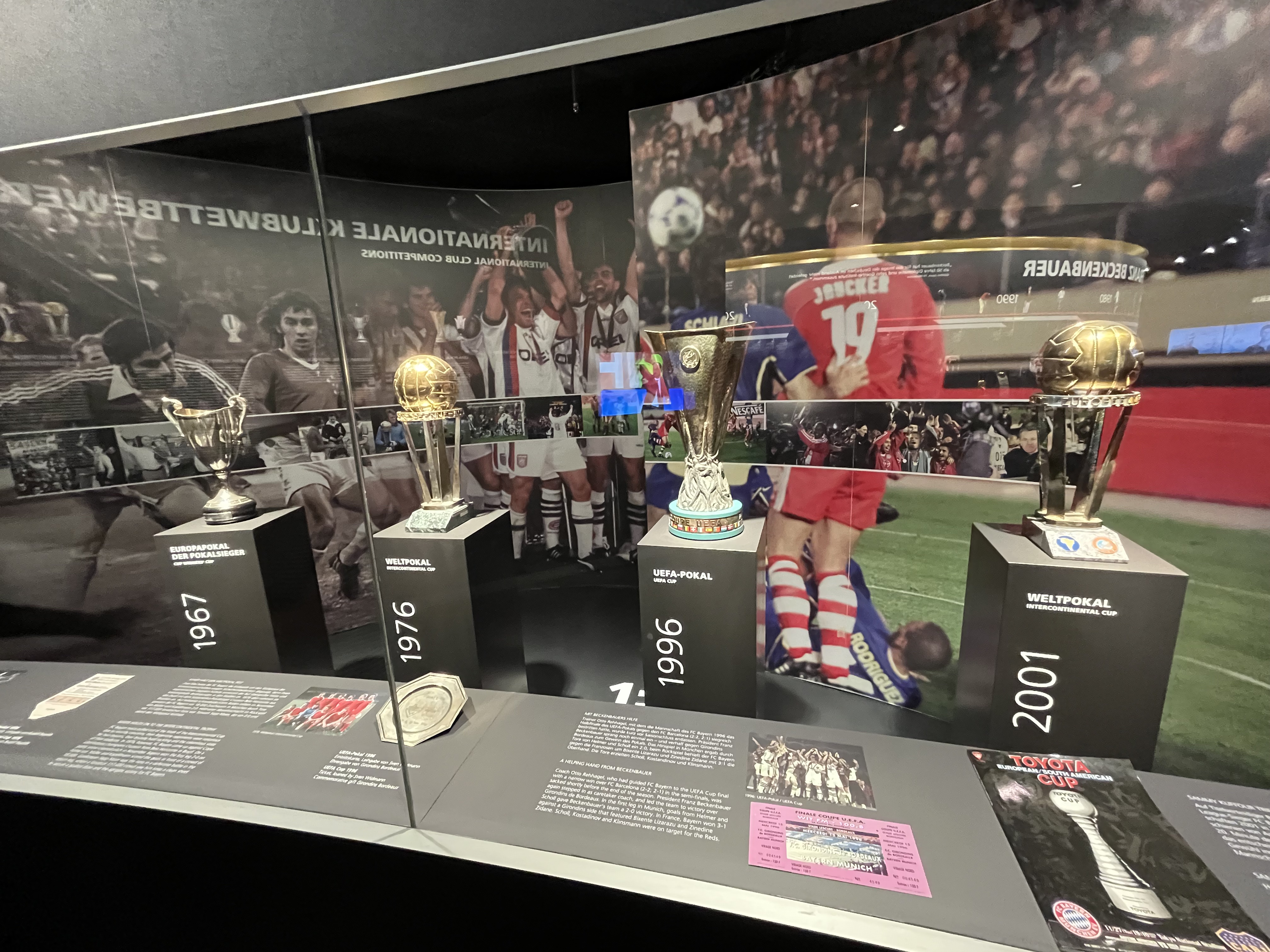
Further international trophies won by Bayern. The win in the 1967 Cup Winners' Cup marked the beginning of the club's success on the European stage.

Jupp Heynckes was hired as coach in 1987, but after two consecutive championships in 1988–89 and 1989–90, Bayern's form dipped. After finishing second in 1990–91, the club finished just five points above the relegation places in 1991–92. In 1993–94, Bayern was eliminated in the UEFA Cup second round to Premier League side Norwich City, who were the only English club to beat Bayern at the Olympiastadion during Bayern's time playing there. Franz Beckenbauer took over for the second half of the 1993–94 season, winning the championship again after a four-year gap. Beckenbauer was then appointed club president.

His successors as coach, Giovanni Trapattoni and Otto Rehhagel, both finished trophyless after a season, not meeting the club's high expectations. During this time, Bayern's players frequently appeared in the gossip pages of the press rather than the sports pages, resulting in the nickname "FC Hollywood". Franz Beckenbauer briefly returned at the end of the 1995–96 season as caretaker coach and led his team to victory in the UEFA Cup, beating Bordeaux in the final. For the 1996–97 season, Trapattoni returned to win the championship. In the following season, Bayern lost the title to newly promoted Kaiserslautern and Trapattoni had to take his leave for the second time.

=== Renewed international success (1990s–2000s) ===

2001 UEFA Champions League final starting lineup

After his success at Borussia Dortmund, Bayern were coached by Ottmar Hitzfeld from 1998 to 2004. In Hitzfeld's first season, Bayern won the Bundesliga and came close to winning the Champions League, losing 2–1 to Manchester United into injury time after leading for most of the match. The following year, in the club's centenary season, Bayern won the third league and cup double in its history. A third consecutive Bundesliga title followed in 2001, won with a stoppage time goal on the final day of the league season. Days later, Bayern won the Champions League for the fourth time after a 25-year gap, defeating Valencia on penalties. The 2001–02 season began with a win in the Intercontinental Cup, but ended trophyless otherwise. In 2002–03, Bayern won their fourth double, leading the league by a record margin of 16 points. Hitzfeld's reign ended in 2004, with Bayern underperforming, including defeat by second division Alemannia Aachen in the DFB-Pokal.

Felix Magath took over and led Bayern to two consecutive doubles. Prior to the start of the 2005–06 season, Bayern moved from the Olympiastadion to the new Allianz Arena, which the club shared with 1860 Munich. On the field, their performance in 2006–07 was erratic. Trailing in the league and having lost to Alemannia Aachen in the cup yet again, coach Magath was sacked shortly after the winter break. Hitzfeld returned as a trainer in January 2007, but Bayern finished the 2006–07 season in fourth position, meaning no Champions League qualification for the first time in more than a decade. Additional losses in the DFB-Pokal and the DFB-Ligapokal left the club with no honours for the season.

=== Domestic dominance and continental treble (2000s–2010s) ===
For the 2007–08 season, Bayern made drastic squad changes to help rebuild. Among new signings were 2006 World Cup players such as Franck Ribéry, Miroslav Klose and Luca Toni. Bayern won the Bundesliga in convincing fashion, leading the standings on every single week of play, and the DFB-Pokal against Borussia Dortmund. After the season, Bayern's long-term goalkeeper Oliver Kahn retired, which left the club without a top-tier goalkeeper for several seasons. The club's coach Ottmar Hitzfeld also retired and Jürgen Klinsmann was chosen as his successor. However, Klinsmann was sacked before the end of his first season as Bayern trailed Wolfsburg in the league, had lost the quarterfinal of the DFB-Pokal to Bayer Leverkusen, and were defeated in the quarterfinal of the Champions League by Barcelona, conceding four goals in the first half of the first leg. Jupp Heynckes was named caretaker coach and led the club to a second-place finish in the league.

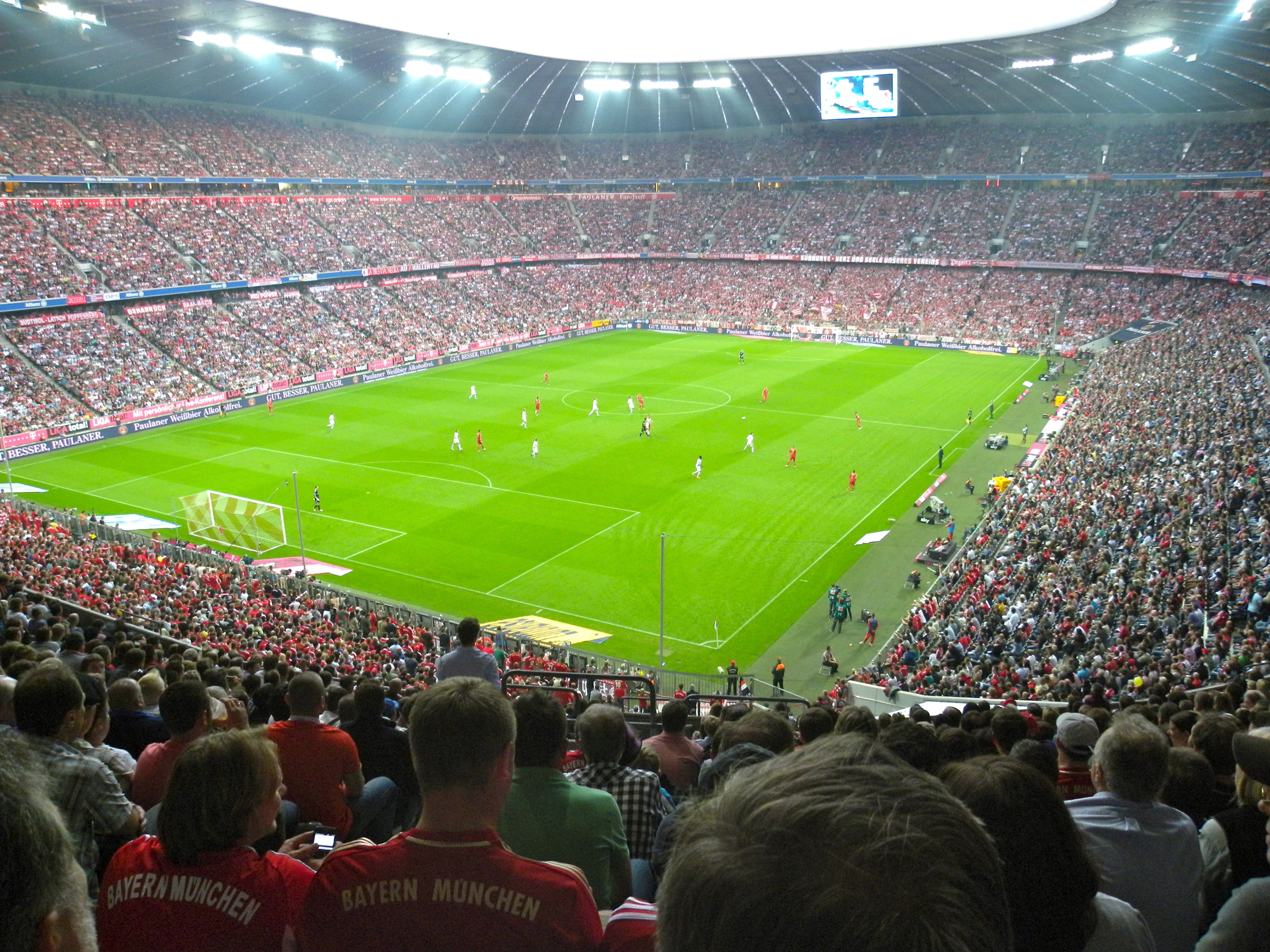
Bayern Munich playing against Bayer Leverkusen in the Bundesliga in September 2011

For the 2009–10 season, Bayern hired Dutch manager Louis van Gaal, and Dutch forward Arjen Robben joined Bayern. Robben, alongside Ribéry, would go on to shape Bayern's playstyle of attacking over the wings for the next ten years. The press quickly dubbed the duo "Robbery". In addition, David Alaba and Thomas Müller were promoted to the first team. Van Gaal stated: "With me, Müller always plays", which has become a much-referenced phrase over the years. On the pitch, Bayern had its most successful season since 2001, securing the domestic double and losing only in the final of the Champions League to Inter Milan. Van Gaal was fired in April 2011 as Bayern was trailing in the league and eliminated in the first knockout round of the Champions League, again by Inter. Heynckes returned for his second permanent spell in the 2011–12 season. Although the club had signed Manuel Neuer, ending Bayern's quest for an adequate substitute for Kahn, and Jérôme Boateng for the season, Bayern remained without a title for a second consecutive season, coming in second to Borussia Dortmund in the league and the cup. The Champions League final was held at the Allianz Arena and Bayern reached the final in their home stadium but lost to Chelsea on penalties.

Bayern Munich went on to win all titles in the 2012–13 season. They set various Bundesliga records along the way, becoming the first German team to win the treble. Bayern finished top of the Bundesliga with a record 91 points, only eleven points shy of a perfect season. In what was Bayern's third Champions League final appearance within four years, they beat Borussia Dortmund 2–1. A week later, they completed the treble by winning the DFB-Pokal final against Stuttgart. During the season, the club announced that they would hire Pep Guardiola as coach for the 2013–14 season. Originally, the club presented this as Heynckes retiring on the expiration of his contract, but Uli Hoeneß later admitted that it was not Heynckes's decision to leave Bayern at the end of the season. It was actually forced by the club's desire to appoint Guardiola.

2013 UEFA Champions League final starting lineup

Guardiola's first season started off well, with Bayern extending a streak of undefeated league matches from the previous season to 53 matches. An eventual loss to Augsburg came two match days after Bayern had won the league title. During the season, Bayern had also claimed two other titles, the FIFA Club World Cup and the UEFA Super Cup, the latter being the last major trophy the club had not yet won. Bayern also won the cup to complete their tenth domestic double, but lost in the semi-final of the Champions League to Real Madrid. Off the pitch, Bayern's president Uli Hoeneß was convicted of tax evasion in March 2014, and sentenced to 3 1/2 years in prison. Hoeneß resigned the next day, and vice-president Karl Hopfner was elected president in May. Under Guardiola, Bayern also won the Bundesliga in 2014–15 and 2015–16, including another double in 2015–16, but did not advance past the semi-finals in the Champions League. Although the club's leadership tried to convince Guardiola to stay, the coach decided not to extend his three-year contract. Carlo Ancelotti was hired as successor to Guardiola. Off the pitch, Uli Hoeneß had been released early from prison and reelected as president in November 2016.

Under Ancelotti, Bayern won a fifth consecutive league title. In July 2017, Bayern announced that 1860 Munich would leave the Allianz Arena for good as the club had been relegated to the fourth-tier Regionalliga due to financial problems. During the 2017–18 season, Bayern's performances were perceived to be increasingly lacklustre, and Ancelotti was sacked after a 3–0 loss to Paris Saint-Germain in the Champions League, early in his second season. Willy Sagnol took over as interim manager for a week, before Jupp Heynckes was announced as coach for the rest of the season, in what was his fourth spell at the club. During the season, the club urged Heynckes—even publicly—to extend his contract, but Heynckes, aged 73, stayed firm that he would retire after the season. Heynckes led the club to another championship, but lost the cup final against Eintracht Frankfurt. Eintracht's coach, Niko Kovač, was named Heynckes' successor at Bayern. In Kovač's first season at Bayern, the club was eliminated by Liverpool in the round of 16 in the Champions League, the first time since 2011 that Bayern did not reach the quarter-final. Bayern won their seventh straight Bundesliga title, however, as they finished two points above Dortmund with 78 points. This Bundesliga title was Ribéry's ninth and Robben's eighth. A week later, Bayern defeated RB Leipzig 3–0 in the 2019 DFB-Pokal final to win their 19th German Cup and to complete their 12th domestic double.

=== Return to German coaches (2019–2024) ===

2020 UEFA Champions League final starting lineup

Kovač was sacked after a 5–1 league loss to Eintracht Frankfurt, with Hansi Flick being promoted to interim manager in November 2019. After a satisfying spell as interim, Bayern announced a month later that Flick would remain in charge. Under Flick, the club won the league, having played the most successful second half of a Bundesliga season in history, winning all but one match, which was drawn. The club also won the cup, completing the club's 13th domestic double. In the Champions League, Bayern reached their first final since 2013, having beaten Barcelona 8–2 in the quarter-finals. Bayern defeated Paris Saint-Germain 1–0 in the final, which was held in Lisbon behind closed doors due to the COVID-19 pandemic. Former PSG player Kingsley Coman scored the only goal of the match. Bayern became the second European club after Barcelona to complete the seasonal treble in two different seasons.

Bayern started the 2020–21 season by winning the UEFA Super Cup for the second time in their history. Bayern also won the FIFA Club World Cup, defeating Mexican team Tigres 1–0 in the final. Bayern became the second club to win the sextuple, after Barcelona did so in 2009. The club also won its ninth Bundesliga title in a row. During the season, Robert Lewandowski broke Gerd Müller's record for most goals scored in a Bundesliga season, having scored 41 times in 29 matches. Flick left at the end of the 2020–21 season to manage the Germany national team, and at Flick's request, RB Leipzig manager Julian Nagelsmann succeeded him. According to several news reports, Bayern paid Leipzig €25m as compensation for Nagelsmann's services, a world record for a manager. Under Nagelsmann, Bayern won its 10th consecutive Bundesliga title.

In March 2023, Nagelsmann was released by Bayern and replaced with Thomas Tuchel, who led the club to a record eleventh consecutive title, after winning a close title race with Borussia Dortmund. In August 2023, Bayern broke the German transfer record again, signing England captain and all-time leading goalscorer Harry Kane from Tottenham Hotspur for a reported fee of €110m. In February 2024, Bayern and Tuchel announced the end of their cooperation after the end of the season. The 2023–24 Bundesliga was the first season in a decade that Bayern Munich did not win, losing out to Bayer Leverkusen, and also the first time in twelve years that the club went trophyless in a season.

=== Vincent Kompany era (2024–present) ===
On 29 May 2024, Vincent Kompany was confirmed as the new head coach of Bayern and received a three-year contract. Bayern started the 2024–25 Bundesliga with a 3–2 win at VfL Wolfsburg. On 5 May 2025, they won their 33rd Bundesliga title (34th German title) after a 2–2 draw between SC Freiburg and Bayer Leverkusen, made them champions with two games to spare. The end of the 2024–25 season saw the departure of club legend Thomas Müller. Having spent 25 years at the club including 17 full seasons with the first team, the club announced its decision not to offer Müller a contract extension. He left the club as the all-time record appearance holder, having earned a record 756 caps across all competitions, winning a record 33 titles with Bayern, and setting numerous records along the way.

The club started the new season in strong fashion by winning the Franz Beckenbauer Supercup, previously known as the DFL-Supercup. New signing Luis Díaz scored the deciding goal in the final. Bayern also came out flying in the 2025–26 Bundesliga season opener by convincingly defeating RB Leipzig 6–0. The team turned the good start into a winning streak and the club managed to set a new record across Europe's top five leagues (a record previously held by AC Milan since 1992–93) with 16 wins in 16 games across all competitions. The winning streak came to an end on matchday 10 in the Bundesliga. Bayern were heading for a defeat against Union Berlin until a late Harry Kane equaliser secured the team a point. Their domestic unbeaten streak came to a conclusion on matchday 19 through a narrow 2–1 defeat to FC Augsburg.

Vincent Kompany's Bayern Munich went 18 games unbeaten, but ran into their first defeat of the season against Arsenal. However the team quickly bounced back with a new winning streak and advanced to the semi-finals of both the 2025–26 DFB-Pokal and the 2025–26 UEFA Champions League.

Bayern recorded a 5–0 away victory against St. Pauli on matchday 29, bringing their season tally to 105 goals and surpassing their previous record of 101 goals set in the 1971–72 season.

Vincent Kompany's Bayern Munich won the 2025–26 Bundesliga, achieving the club's 34th Bundesliga title (35th German title), earlier before the league's end with four matches left, during the matchday 30, winning 4–2 at home over VfB Stuttgart.

On 21 April 2026, Michael Wiesinger was appointed as head of sport and youth development at the FC Bayern Campus.

Bayern reached the final of the DFB-Pokal for the first time since 2020, defeating Bayer Leverkusen in the semifinals. In the Champions League, the team didn't have the same fortune as they were eliminated by holders Paris Saint-Germain. The return leg in Munich got overshadowed by many controversial calls, all falling out to the French side.

In the German Cup final Bayern faced holders VfB Stuttgart. After an even contested and scoreless first half, Bayern took the lead from Harry Kane shortly into the second half. Kane went on to score a hat-trick in the final and ended the season with 61 goals in 51 games across all competitions. Kane also finished topscorer in the race for the prestigious European Golden Shoe, winning it for the second time in his career, both times representing Bayern. Kane subsequently won the 2026 Ballon d'Or, becoming the first non-German player to win for Bayern and the first for the club since Karl-Heinz Rummenigge in 1981.

The club ended the 2025–26 season winning the domestic double for the first time in six years.

== Kits ==
In the original club constitution, Bayern's colours were named as white and blue, but the club played in white shirts with black shorts until 1905 when Bayern joined MSC. MSC decreed that the footballers would have to play in red shorts. Also, the younger players were called red shorts, which were meant as an insult. For most of the club's early history, Bayern had primarily worn white and maroon home kits. In the 1968–69 season, Bayern changed to red and blue striped shirts, with blue shorts and socks. Between 1969 and 1973, the team wore a home strip of red and white striped shirts with either red or white shorts and red socks. In the 1973–74 season, the team switched to an all-white kit featuring single vertical red and blue stripes on the shirt.

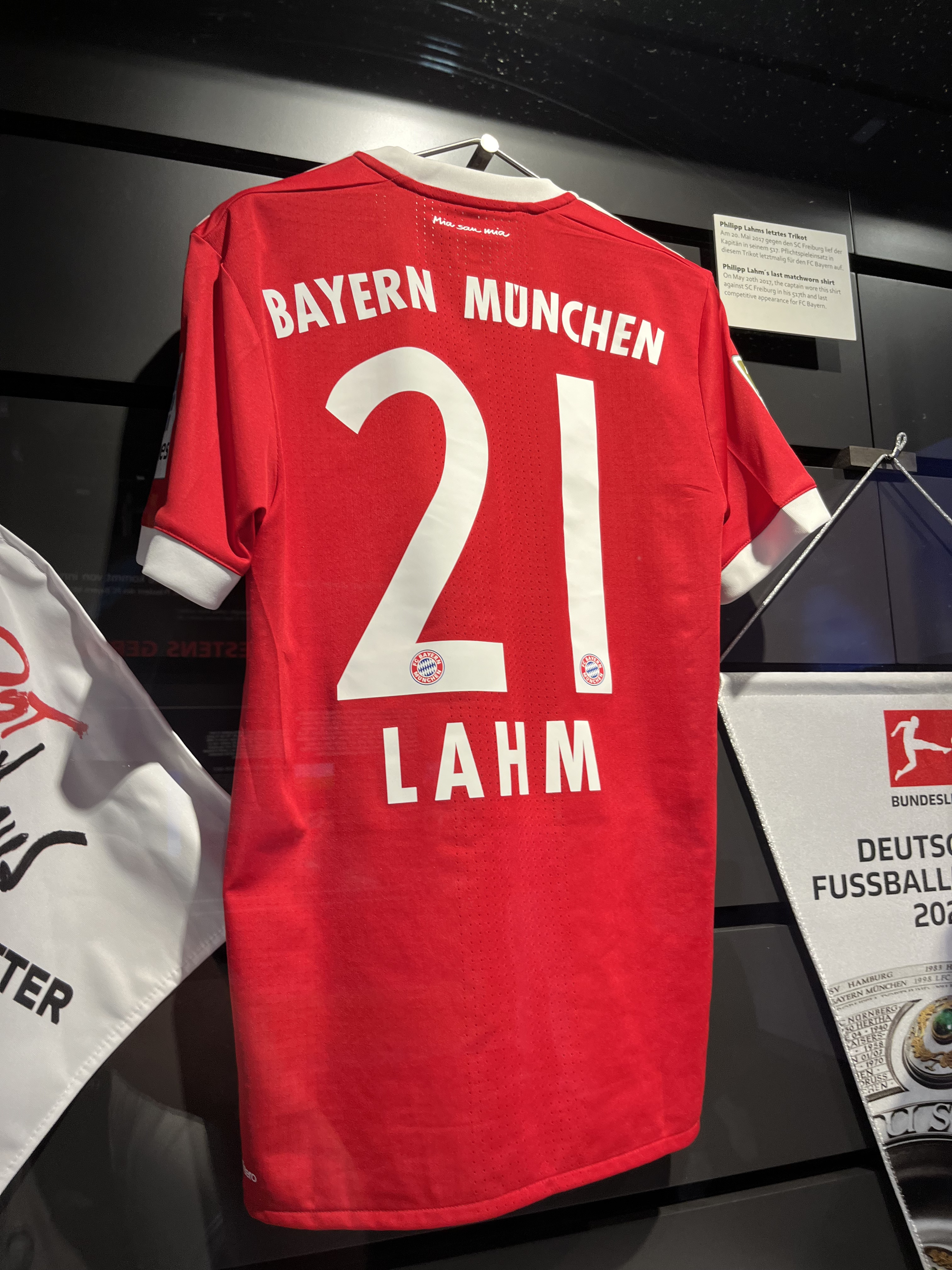
Shirt worn by club legend Philipp Lahm

From 1974 onwards, Bayern has mostly worn an all-red home kit with white trim. Bayern revived the red and blue striped colour scheme between 1995 and 1997. In 1997, blue was the dominant colour for the first time when Adidas released an all navy blue home kit with a red chest band. In 1999, Bayern returned to a predominantly red kit, which featured blue sleeves, and, in 2000, the club released a traditional all-red kit with white trim to be worn for Champions League matches. Bayern also wore a Rotwein-coloured home kit in Bundesliga matches between 2001 and 2003, and during the 2006–07 Champions League campaign, in reference to their first-choice colours prior to the late 1960s.

The club's away kit has had a wide range of colours, including white, black, blue, and gold-green. Bayern also features a distinct international kit. During the 2013–14 season, Bayern used an all-red home kit with a Bavarian flag diamond watermark pattern, a Lederhosen-inspired white and black Oktoberfest away kit, and an all-navy blue international kit. In the 1980s and 1990s, Bayern used a special away kit when playing at Kaiserslautern, representing the Brazilian colours blue and yellow, a superstition borne from the fact that the club found it hard to win there.

=== Kit suppliers and shirt sponsors ===
Period	Kit manufacturer	Shirt sponsor (chest)	Shirt sponsor (sleeve)
1964–1971	Palme Trikotfabrik	None	None
1971–1974	Erima	None	None
1974–1978	Adidas	Adidas	None
1978–1981	Adidas	Magirus Deutz	None
1981–1984	Adidas	Iveco Magirus	None
1984–1989	Adidas	Commodore	None
1989–2002	Adidas	Opel	None
2002–2017	Adidas	Deutsche Telekom	None
2017–2018	Adidas	Deutsche Telekom	Hamad Airport
2018–2023	Adidas	Deutsche Telekom	Qatar Airways
2023–2024	Adidas	Deutsche Telekom	Audi
2024–present	Adidas	Deutsche Telekom	Allianz

=== Kit deals ===
Kit supplier	Period	Latest contract announcement	Current contract duration	Value	Notes
Adidas	1974–present	28 April 2015	2015–2030 (15 years)	Total €900 million (€60 million per year)	

== Crest ==
Flag of Bavaria

Bayern's crest has changed several times. Originally it consisted of the stylised letters F, C, B, M, which were woven into one symbol. The original crest was blue. The colours of Bavaria were included for the first time in 1954. The crest from 1919 to 1924 denotes "Bayern FA", whereby "FA" stands for Fußball-Abteilung, i.e., Football Department; Bayern then was integrated into TSV Jahn Munich and constituted its football department.

The modern version of the crest has changed from the 1954 version in several steps. While the crest consisted of a single colour only for most of the time, namely blue or red, the current crest is blue, red, and white. It has the colours of Bavaria in its centre, and FC Bayern München is written in white on a red ring enclosing the Bavarian colours.

Bayern Munich logo history
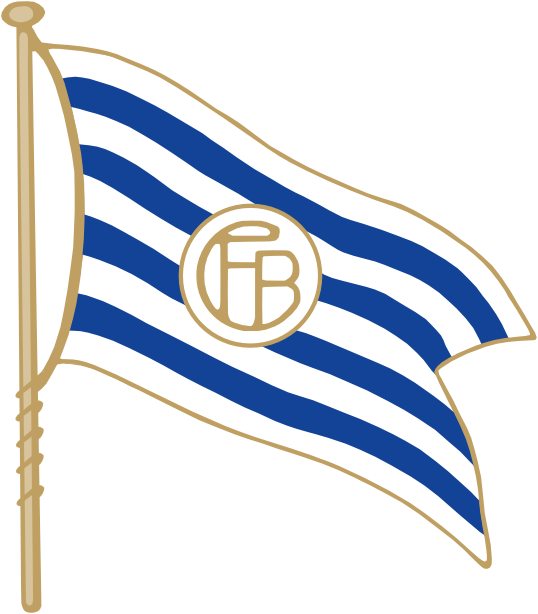
1901

1902–1906

1906–1919

1919–1924

1925–1954 (Note: Between 1938 and 1945, all German clubs had to wear the emblem of the National Socialist League of the Reich for Physical Exercise on their shirts instead of their actual crests.)

1954–1996

1996–2002

2002–2017

2017–2024

2024–present

== Stadiums ==
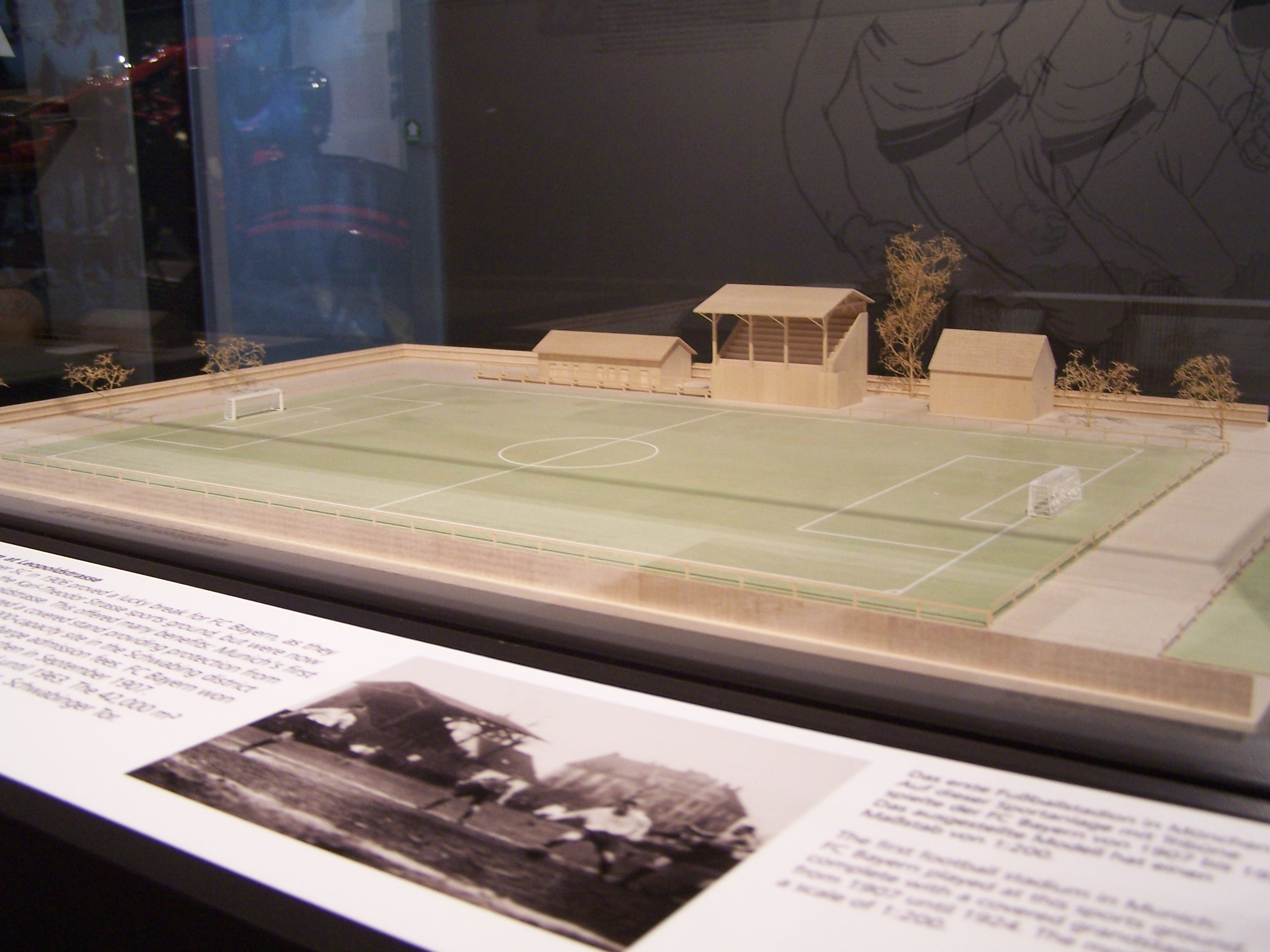
A model of Bayern's first stadium, their home from 1906 to 1924

Bayern played its first training games at the Schyrenplatz in the centre of Munich. The first official games were held on the Theresienwiese. In 1901, Bayern moved to a field of its own, located in Schwabing at the Clemensstraße. After joining the Münchner Sport-Club (MSC) in 1906, Bayern moved in May 1907 to MSC's ground at the Leopoldstraße. As the crowds gathering for Bayern's home games increased at the beginning of the 1920s, Bayern had to switch to various other premises in Munich.

From 1925, Bayern shared the Grünwalder Stadion with 1860 Munich. Until the Second World War, the stadium was owned by 1860 Munich, and is still colloquially known as Sechz'ger ("Sixties") Stadium. It was destroyed during the war, and efforts to rebuild it resulted in a patchwork. Bayern's record crowd at the Grünwalder Stadion is reported as more than 50,000 in the home game against 1. FC Nürnberg in the 1961–62 season. In the Bundesliga era, the stadium had a maximum capacity of 44,000, which was reached on several occasions, but the capacity has since been reduced to 21,272. As was the case at most of this period's stadiums, the vast majority of the stadium was given over to terracing. Since 1995, the second teams and youth teams of both clubs played in the stadium.

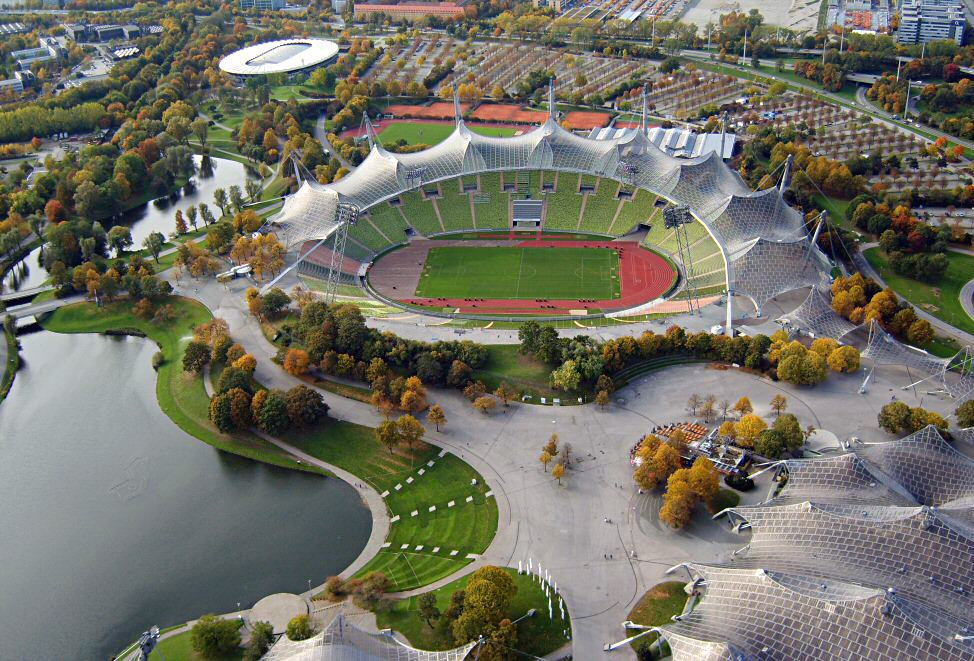
The Olympiastadion, home of Bayern Munich from 1972 to 2005

For the 1972 Summer Olympics, the city of Munich built the Olympiastadion. The stadium, renowned for its architecture, was inaugurated in the last Bundesliga match of the 1971–72 season. The match drew a capacity crowd of 79,000, a total which was reached again on numerous occasions. In its early days, the stadium was considered one of the foremost stadiums in the world, and played host to numerous major finals, such as that of the 1974 FIFA World Cup. In the following years, the stadium underwent several modifications, such as an increase in seating space from approximately 50 per cent to 66 per cent. Eventually, the stadium had a capacity of 63,000 for national matches and 59,000 for international occasions such as European Cup competitions. Many people, however, began to feel that the stadium was too cold in winter, with half the audience exposed to the weather due to lack of cover. A further complaint was the distance between the spectators and the pitch, betraying the stadium's track and field heritage. Renovation proved impossible, as the architect Günther Behnisch vetoed major modifications of the stadium. After much discussion, the city of Munich, the state of Bavaria, Bayern Munich and 1860 Munich jointly decided at the end of 2000 to build a new stadium. While Bayern had wanted a purpose-built football stadium for several years, the awarding of the 2006 FIFA World Cup to Germany stimulated the discussion as the Olympiastadion no longer met the FIFA criteria to host a World Cup game. Located on the northern outskirts of Munich, the Allianz Arena has been in use since the beginning of the 2005–06 season. Since August 2012, 2,000 more seats were added in the last row of the top tier, increasing the capacity to 71,000. In January 2015, a proposal to increase the capacity was approved by the city council, with the Allianz Arena holding a capacity of 75,000 (70,000 in Champions League). The stadium's most prominent feature is the translucent outer layer, which can be illuminated in different colours for effects. Red lighting is used for Bayern home games and white for Germany national team home games. In May 2012, Bayern opened a museum about its history, Bayern Erlebniswelt, inside the Allianz Arena.

== Supporters ==
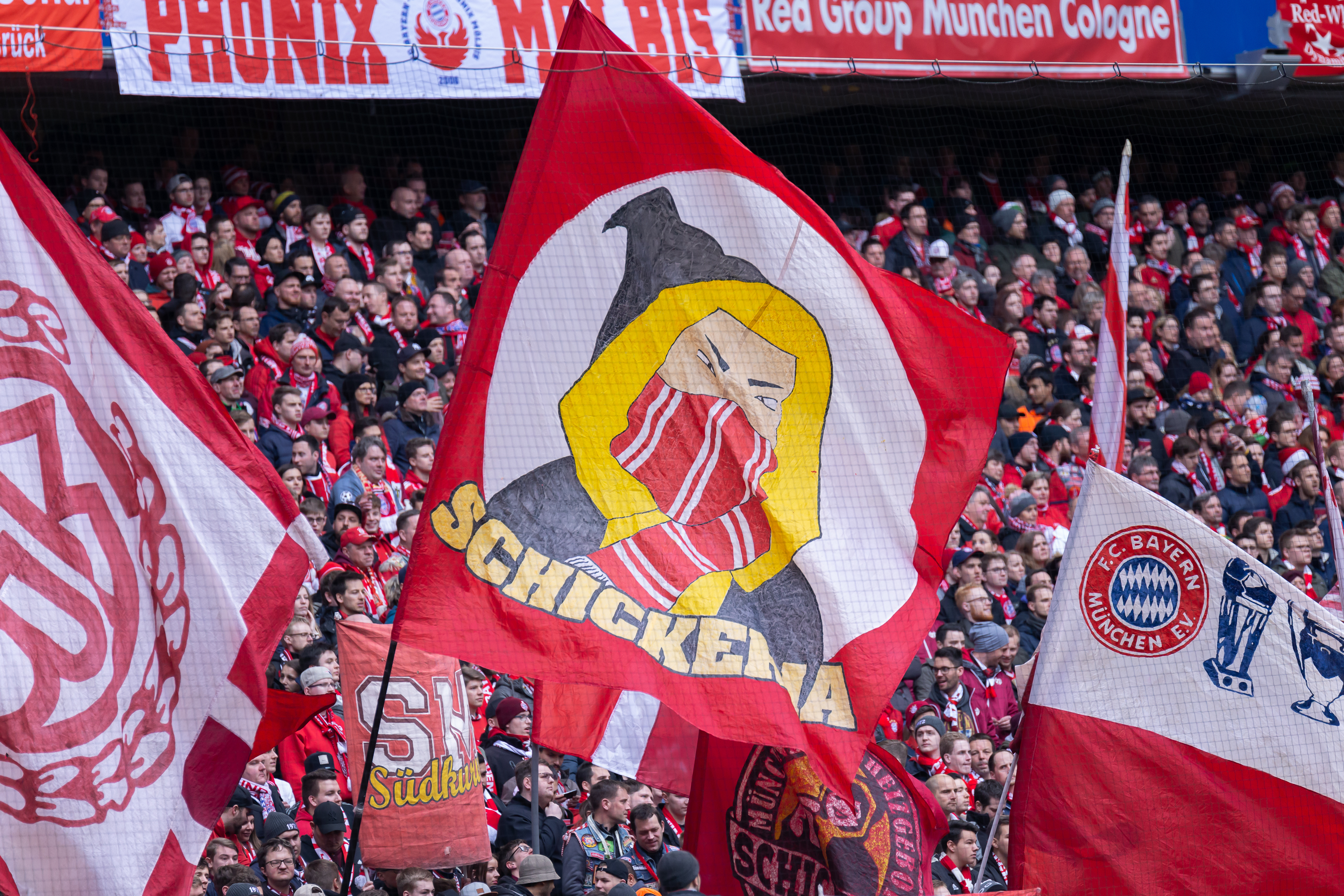
A part of the "Südkurve" – the usual spot of the ultra-scene at Allianz Arena

At the 2018 annual general meeting, the Bayern board reported that the club had 291,000 official members and 4,433 officially registered fan clubs with over 390,000 members. This made the club the largest fan membership club in the world. Bayern has an average of 75,000 fans at the Allianz Arena which is at 100 per cent capacity level. Every Bundesliga game has been sold-out for years. Bayern's away games have also been sold out for many years. According to a study by Sport+Markt from 2010, Bayern is the fifth-most popular football club in Europe with 20.7 million supporters, ranking first of all German clubs.

The club's most prominent ultra groups are Schickeria München, Inferno Bavaria, Red Munichs '89, Südkurve '73, Munichmaniacs 1996, Red Angels, and Red Sharks. The ultras scene of Bayern Munich has been recognised for certain groups taking stance against right-wing extremism, racism and homophobia, and in 2014 the group Schickeria München received the Julius Hirsch Award by the DFB for its commitment against antisemitism and discrimination.

Stern des Südens is the song which fans sing at FCB home games. In the 1990s, they also used to sing FC Bayern, Forever Number One. Another notable song is Mia San Mia (Note: Mia San Mia is a phrase originated in the 19th century Austro-Hungarian Empire, later used by German politician Franz Josef Strauss, chairman of the Christian Social Union (CSU), before being adopted by Bayern during the 1980s.) (Bavarian for "we are who we are"), which is a well-known motto of the club as well. A renowned catchphrase for the team is "Packmas", which is a Bavarian phrase for the German "Packen wir es", which means "let's do it". The club's mascot is an anthropomorphic bear named "Berni" since 2004.

The club also has had a number of high-profile supporters, among them Pope Benedict XVI, Boris Becker, Alexander Zverev, Wladimir Klitschko, Horst Seehofer and Edmund Stoiber, former Minister-President of Bavaria.

== Rivalries ==
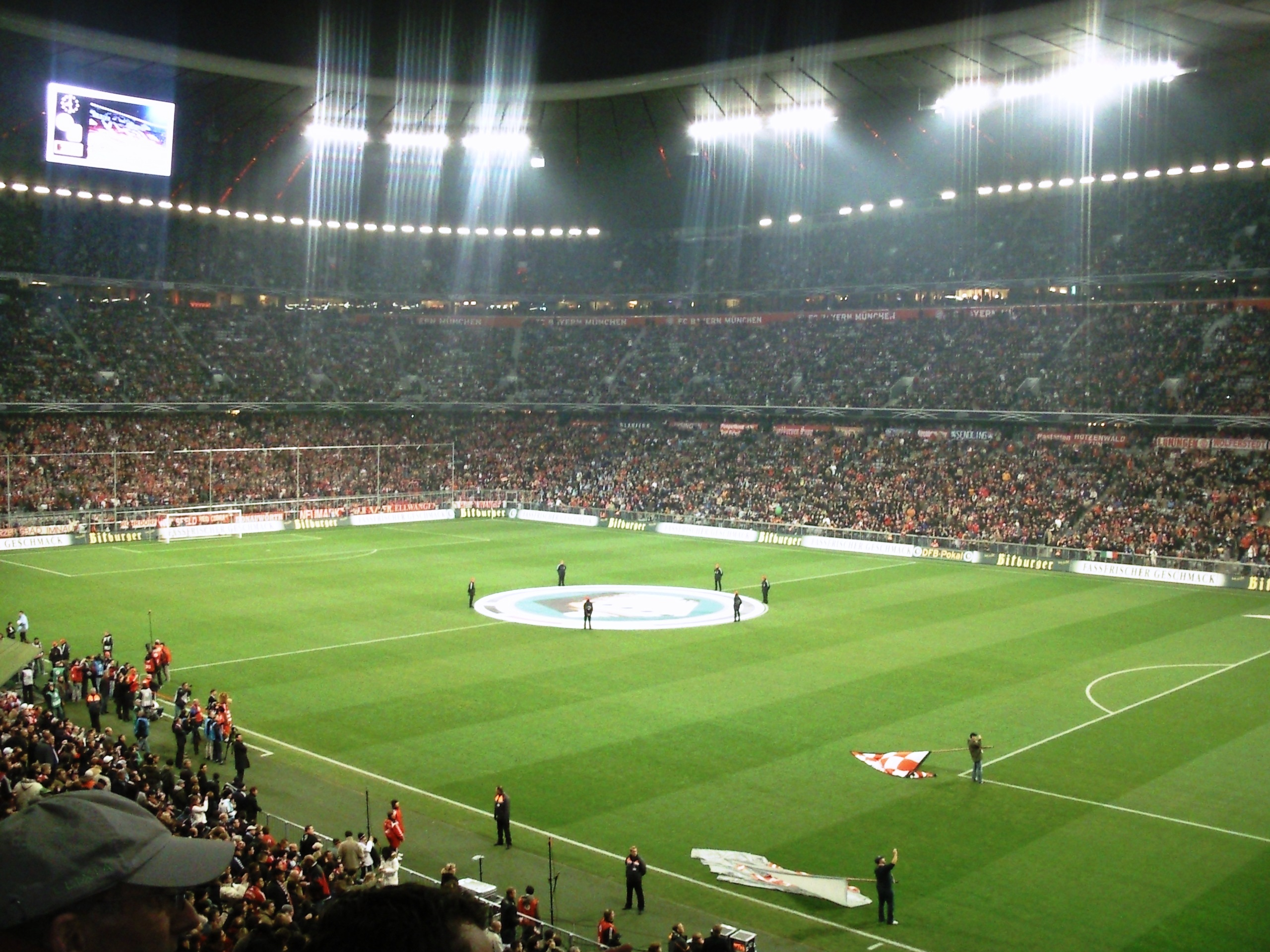
A Munich derby match at the Allianz Arena between Bayern and 1860 Munich in the quarter-final of the 2007–08 DFB-Pokal on 27 February 2008

=== Borussia Dortmund ===
Bayern–Dortmund are two of the most successful teams in German football, having won a combined total of 26 of the past 31 Bundesliga titles as of the 2023–24 season. The two teams fought closely for the Bundesliga title in the early 2010s, and met in the 2013 UEFA Champions League final. The rivalry between the clubs grew during the 1990s, as Dortmund's stature increased to challenge perennial title favourites Bayern, winning two Bundesliga titles in 1994–95 and 1995–96.

In 1996, Bayern captain Lothar Matthäus accused Germany teammate Andreas Möller of being a 'crybaby', wiping imaginary tears from his face; Möller reacted by slapping Matthäus. At the end of that season, Dortmund won the 1997 UEFA Champions League final which happened to be played at the Olympiastadion, Bayern's home ground.

The teams met in the quarter-finals of the next edition of the Champions League, and Dortmund prevailed over two legs thanks to a single goal from Stéphane Chapuisat. That summer, Bayern hired Dortmund's successful coach Ottmar Hitzfeld to work for them. Tempers flared twice during Bayern and Dortmund's second meeting in the 1998–99 Bundesliga, as Bayern goalkeeper Oliver Kahn first attempted a flying kung-fu kick at Chapuisat, and later appeared to bite Heiko Herrlich's ear.

In the early 2000s, both clubs remained successful, as Bayern lost one Champions League final (1999) then won another (2001) in addition to more domestic success, while Dortmund won the 2001–02 Bundesliga and reached the UEFA Cup final the same year. An angry 2001 league meeting between the pair was notable for ten yellow cards and three red being shown (a Bundesliga record for indiscipline). However, Dortmund soon fell heavily into debt, and a €2m loan from Bayern in 2004 was a major reason for them being saved from bankruptcy.

On 19 April 2008, the two sides clashed in the 2008 DFB-Pokal final for the first time that took place in Berlin. Luca Toni opened the scoring after eleven minutes, but Mladen Petric drew Dortmund level in stoppage time, forcing thirty additional minutes. The Italian completed his double in extra time, thus lifting Bayern to cup glory.

=== European rivals ===
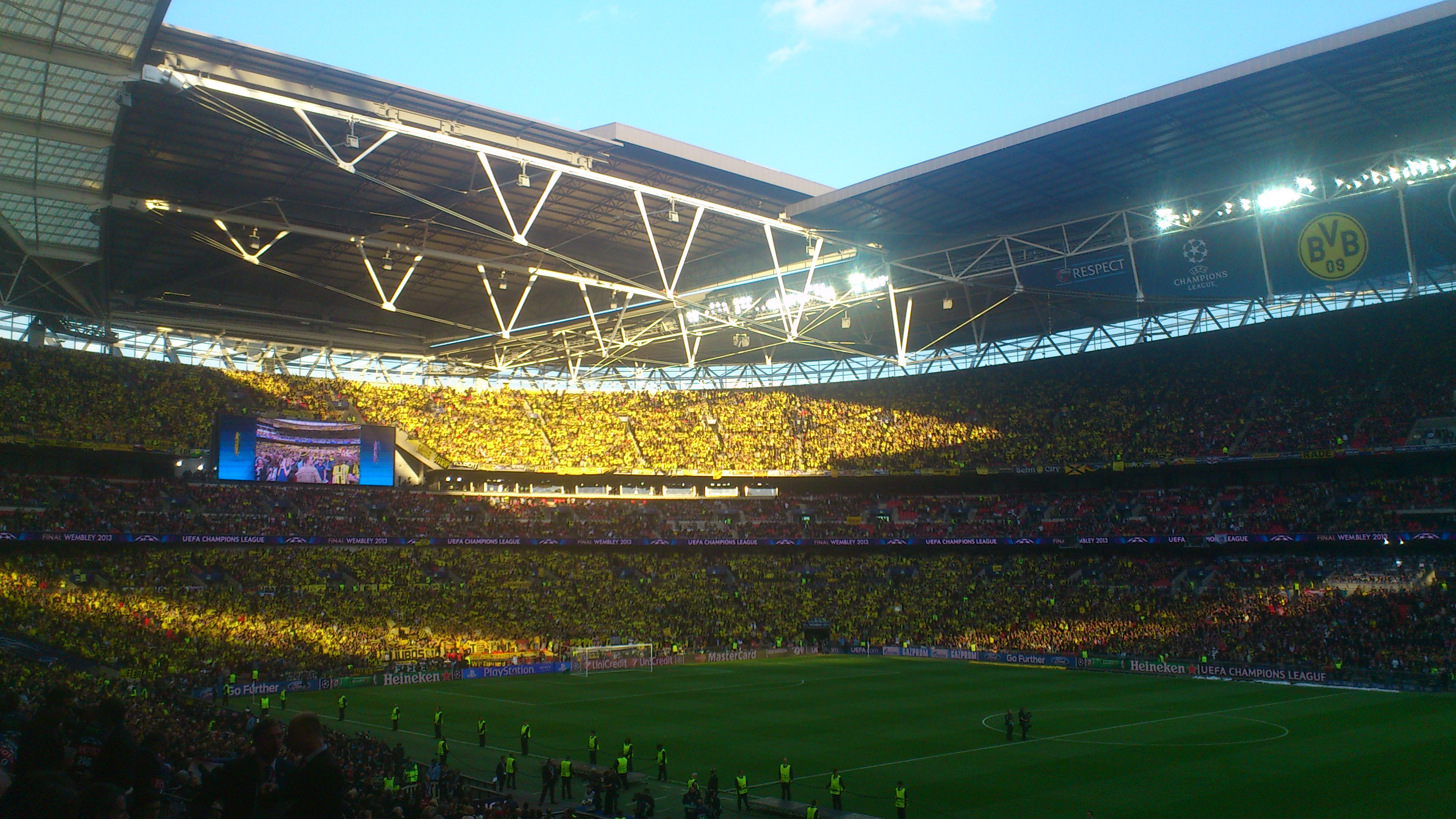
Bayern Munich won 2–1 against Borussia Dortmund to win the 2012–13 UEFA Champions League on 25 May 2013.

Amongst Bayern's chief European rivals are Barcelona, Real Madrid, AC Milan, and Manchester United. Real Madrid versus Bayern is the match that has historically been played most often in the Champions League/European Cup with 28 matches. Due to Bayern being traditionally hard to beat for Madrid, Madrid supporters often refer to Bayern as the "Bestia negra" ("Black Beast"). Despite the number of duels, Bayern and Real have never met in the final of a Champions League or European Cup.

== Organization and finance ==
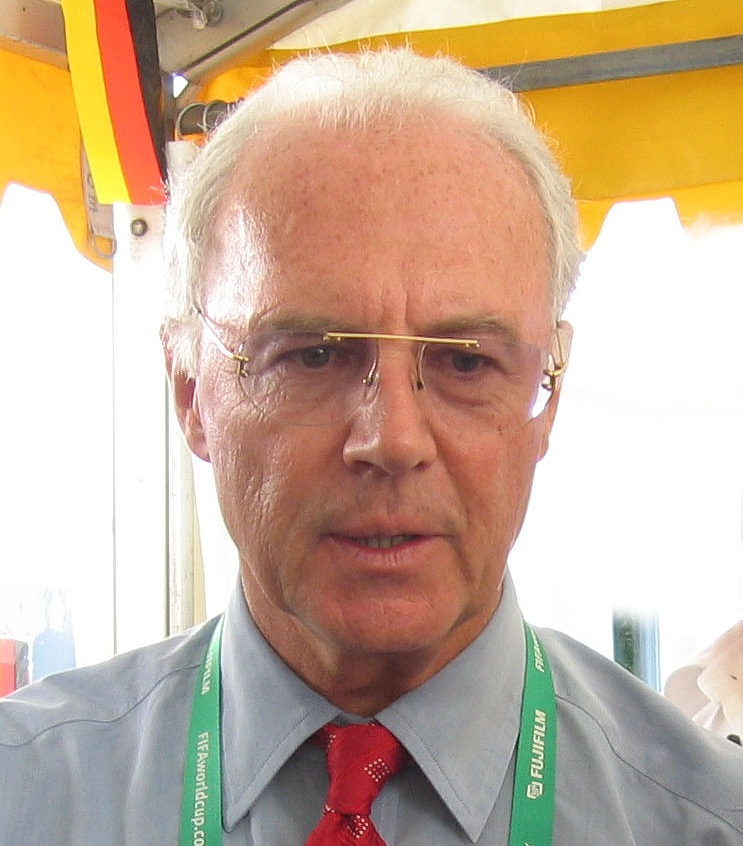
Bayern's former president from 1994 to 2009 and former player Franz Beckenbauer

Bayern is mostly led by former club players. From 2016 to 2019, Uli Hoeneß served as the club's president, following Karl Hopfner who had been in office from 2014; Hoeneß had resigned in 2014 after being convicted of tax fraud. Oliver Kahn was the chairman of the executive board of the AG. The supervisory board of nine consists mostly of managers of big German corporations, including Herbert Hainer, the former CEO of Adidas, Herbert Diess, the former chairman of Volkswagen, Werner Zedelius, a senior advisor at Allianz, Timotheus Höttges, the CEO of Deutsche Telekom, Dieter Mayer, Edmund Stoiber, Theodor Weimer, the CEO of Deutsche Börse, and Michael Diederich, speaker of the board at UniCredit Bank.

Professional football at Bayern is run by the spin-off organisation FC Bayern München AG. Bayern is run like a joint stock company, a company whose stock are not listed on the public stock exchange, but is privately owned. The club FC Bayern München e.V. is the majority shareholder of FC Bayern München AG with 75 per cent of shares. Three German corporations, the sports goods manufacturer Adidas, the automobile company Audi and the financial services group Allianz each hold 8.33 per cent of the shares, 25 per cent in total.

Adidas acquired its shares in 2002 for €77 million. The money was designated to help finance the Allianz Arena. In 2009, Audi paid €90 million for their share. The capital was used to repay the loan on the Allianz Arena. In early 2014, Allianz became the third shareholder of the company acquiring theirs share for €110 million. With the sale, Bayern paid off the remaining debt on the Allianz Arena 16 years ahead of schedule.

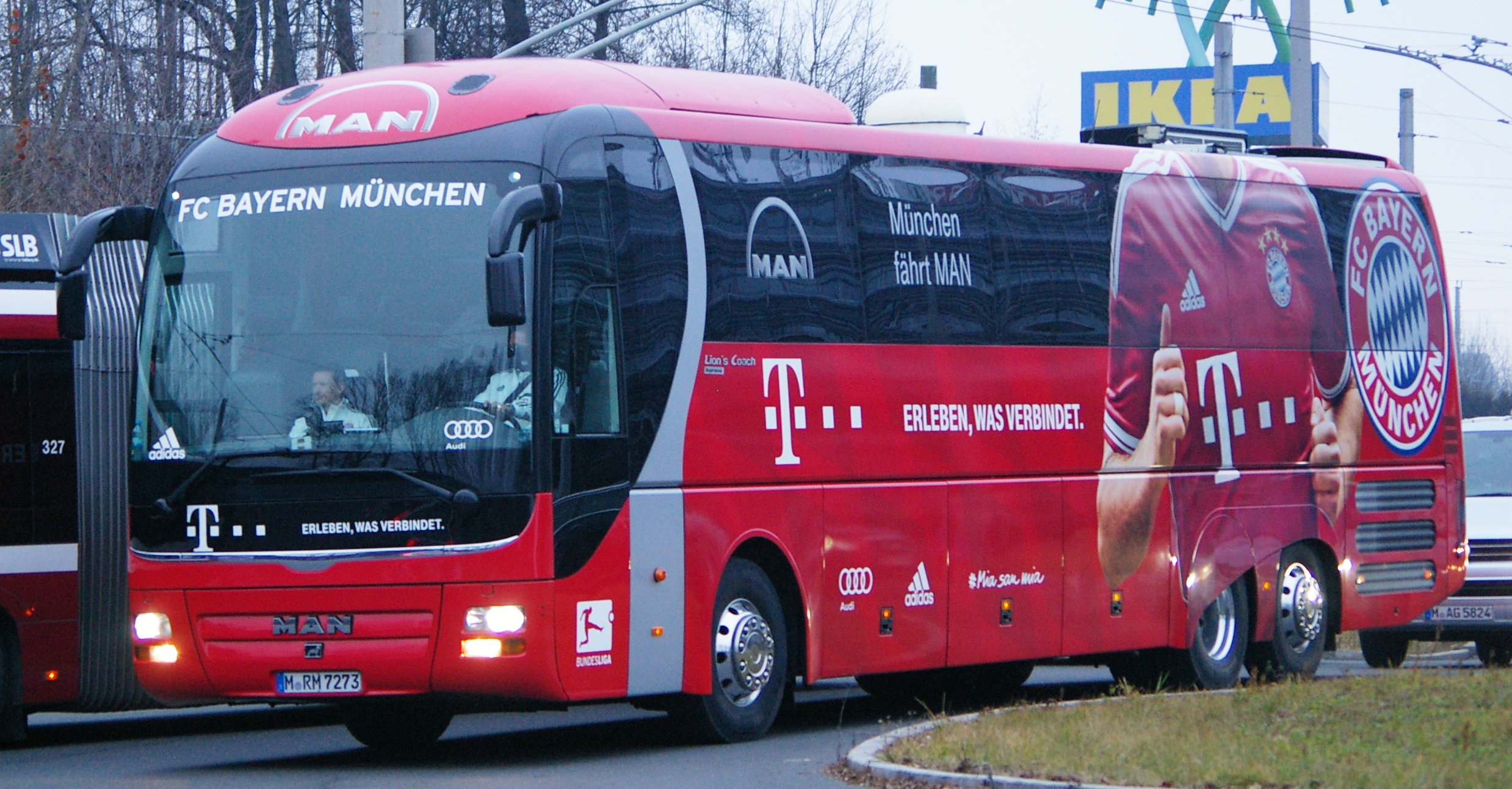
The Bayern Munich team bus provided by sponsor MAN

Bayern's shirt sponsor is Deutsche Telekom. Deutsche Telekom has been Bayern's shirt sponsor since the start of 2002–03 season. The company extended their sponsorship deal in August 2015 until the end of the 2026–27 season. Previous kit sponsors were Adidas (1974–78), Magirus Deutz and Iveco (1978–84), Commodore (1984–89) and Opel (1989–2002). Bayern's kit manufacturer is Adidas, who have been Bayern's kit manufacturer since 1974. The deal with Adidas runs until the end of the 2029–30 season with a value of approximately €900 million.

Bayern is an exception in professional football, having generated profits for 27 consecutive years. Other clubs often report losses, realising transfers via loans, whereas Bayern always uses current assets. For the 2023–24 season/DFML edition, Bayern Munich ranked fifth worldwide with revenues of approximately €765.4 million. In the 2024–25 season, Bayern had the fifth highest revenue in club football, generating revenue of €978.3 million. Bayern had the second-highest commercial revenue in the 2019 Deloitte Football Money League, behind only Real Madrid. Bayern's commercial revenue was €349 million (55 per cent of total revenue). In the 2022 DFML figures, they had €611.4 million total revenue, of which €345.2 million (≈ 52%) came from commercial income (sponsorships, merchandising, licensing). In contrast, Bayern's matchday revenue trails other top clubs at €103.8 million (17 per cent of their total revenue). In 2017, Forbes ranked Bayern as the world's fourth-most valuable football club in their annual list, estimating the club's value at €2.5 billion. Their position (fifth/sixth) indicates elite status—both in sporting and financial terms. Their strong commercial base gives them resilience, though the gap to the very top clubs (e.g., those generating > €1 billion) remains. In the 2025–26 season, Bayern extended the record with €988.2 million.

While other European clubs have mainly marketed to international audiences, Bayern had focused on Germany. Since the 2010s, Bayern have started to focus their marketing more on Asia and the United States. Bayern made summer tours to the United States in 2014 and 2016. Bayern went to China in the summer of 2015 and returned in the summer of 2017, where they also played games in Singapore. Then for the “Audi Summer Tour 2023” they planned a trip to Asia (Japan) from 24 July to 3 August. On the summer of 2024 the club went to Seoul, for the first time the club went to South Korea. In August 2014, Bayern opened an office in New York City as the club wants to strengthen their brand positioning against other top European clubs in the United States. In March 2017, Bayern opened an office in Shanghai, China.

Further international expansion followed in 2022 and 2025 as the club opened an office first in Bangkok, Thailand and then in Seoul, South Korea.

== Social engagement and charity ==
Bayern has been involved with charitable ventures for a long time, helping other football clubs in financial disarray as well as ordinary people in misery. In the wake of the 2004 Indian Ocean Tsunami the "FC Bayern – Hilfe e. V." was founded, a foundation that aims to concentrate the social engagements of the club. At its inception, this venture was funded with €600,000, raised by officials and players of the club. The money was, amongst other things, used to build a school in Marathenkerny, Sri Lanka, and to rebuild the area of Trincomalee, Sri Lanka.

The club has also assisted other sport clubs in financial disarray. The club has supported its local rival 1860 Munich with player transfers at favourable rates and direct money transfers. When St. Pauli threatened to lose its licence for professional football due to financial problems, Bayern met the club for a friendly game, giving all gate receipts to St. Pauli. In 1993, Alexander Zickler transferred from Dynamo Dresden to Bayern for 2.3 Million DM, with many considering the sum to have been a subvention for the financially threatened Dresdeners. In 2003, Bayern provided a €2 Million loan to the nearly bankrupt Borussia Dortmund.

In 2009, Mark van Bommel's home club Fortuna Sittard was in financial distress; Bayern played a charity game at the Dutch club, gifting them gate receipts. In 2013, Bayern played a charity game against financially threatened third division side Hansa Rostock. The game raised about €1 million, securing Hansa's licence. In 2017, Bayern played a benefit match against financial troubled Kickers Offenbach, with all gate receipts going to Kickers Offenbach.

In 2019, Bayern played a benefit match against Kaiserslautern. The match was played so Kaiserslautern could secure their licence to play in the German third division. All income from the match went to Kaiserslautern. In March 2020, Bayern, Borussia Dortmund, RB Leipzig and Bayer Leverkusen, the four German UEFA Champions League teams for the 2019–20 season, collectively gave €20 million to Bundesliga and 2. Bundesliga teams that were struggling financially during the COVID-19 pandemic.

In mid-2013, Bayern was the first club to give financial support to the Magnus Hirschfeld National Foundation. The foundation researches the living environment of LGBT people, and develops an education concept to facilitate unbiased dealing with LGBT themes in football. In 2016, Bayern received the Nine Values Cup, an award of the international children's social programme Football for Friendship.

The club has also organised a charity competition called 'Beckenbauer Cup'. The predecessor event, Beckenbauer Cup explicitly donated its proceeds to Franz Beckenbauer Foundation — a foundation helping people with disability, people who are ill or otherwise in need. According to post-tournament reporting, the Beckenbauer Cup raised €75,000 for charity, which will be donated to the foundation.

The club is also going is in the process of organizing the legend's cup. The “Legends Cup” is a special indoor-football tournament hosted by Bayern Munich. It's part of a tradition of “legends” events by Bayern: most recently, they organized the Beckenbauer Cup and the Legends Cup is its successor in a modern format.The matches are played in a smaller, fast-paced format: small field, artificial turf, LED-board surroundings — more like futsal or five-a-side than full-size 11v11.

== Training facility ==
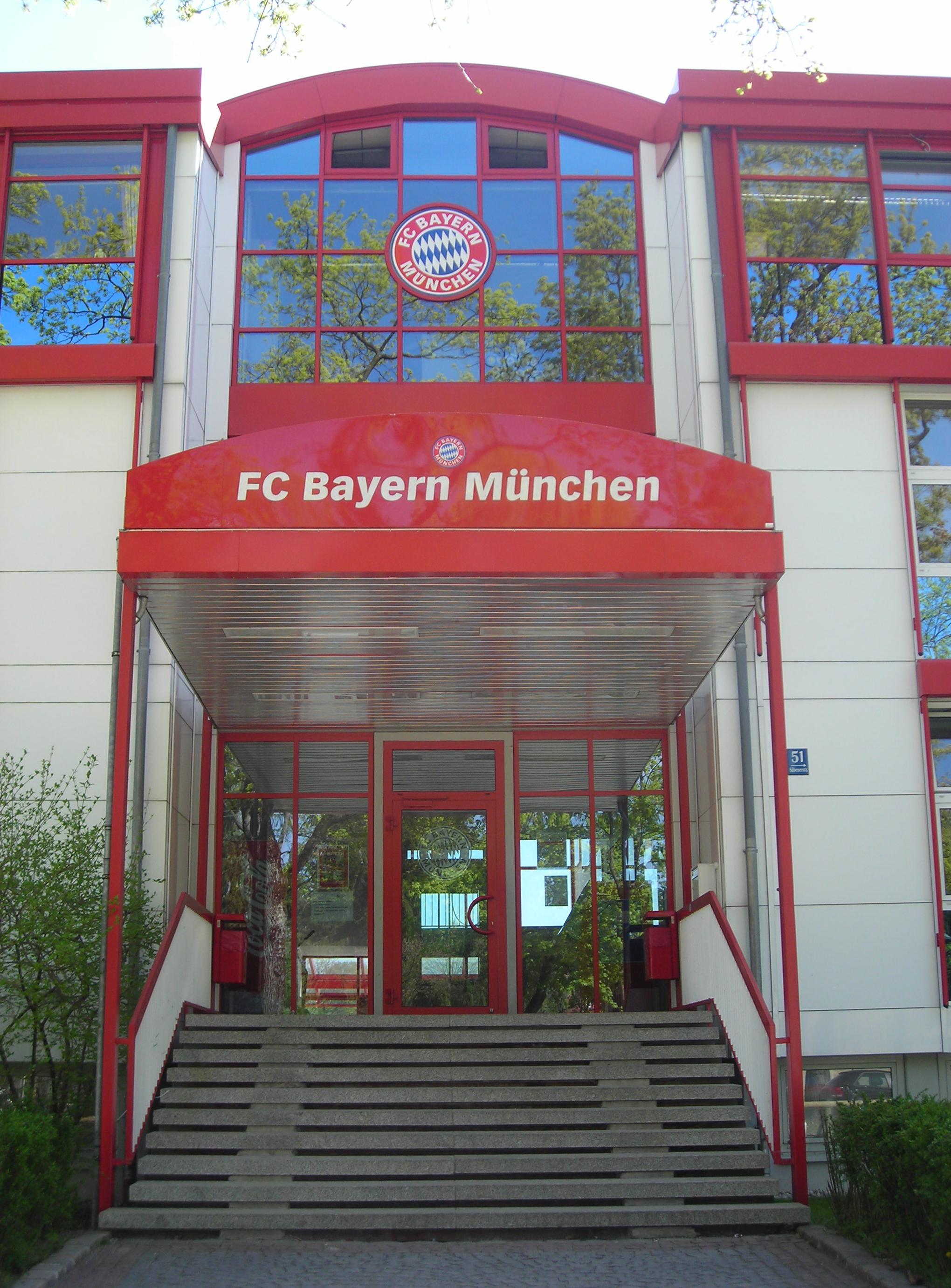
The entrance of the Bayern Munich Headquarters

Bayern Munich headquarters and training facility is called Säbener Straße and it is located in the Untergiesing-Harlaching borough of Munich. The first team and the reserve team train at the facility. There are five grass pitches, two of which have undersoil heating, two artificial grass fields, a beach volleyball court and a multi-functional sports hall.

In August 2017, the club's sports complex, the Bayern Campus, opened at a cost of €70 million. The campus is located north of Munich at Ingolstädter Straße. The campus is 30 hectare and has eight football pitches for youth teams from the U-9s to the U-19s and the women's and girls' teams. The campus also has a 2,500-capacity stadium where the U-17s and the U-19s play their matches. The Allianz Bayern Akademie is located on the campus site, and the academy has 35 apartments for young talents who do not live in the Greater Munich area. The academy building also has offices for youth coaches and staff.

== Honours ==
Bayern is historically the most successful team in German football, as they have won the most championships and the most cups. They are also Germany's most successful team in international competitions, having won fourteen trophies. Bayern is the only club to have won all three major European competitions, to have won three consecutive European Cups and to have won the treble twice, one of which was part of the larger, and more elusive, "sextuple" (2020).

Type	Competition	Titles	Seasons
Domestic	German Champions/Bundesliga	35	1932, 1968–69, 1971–72, 1972–73, 1973–74, 1979–80, 1980–81, 1984–85, 1985–86, 1986–87, 1988–89, 1989–90, 1993–94, 1996–97, 1998–99, 1999–2000, 2000–01, 2002–03, 2004–05, 2005–06, 2007–08, 2009–10, 2012–13, 2013–14, 2014–15, 2015–16, 2016–17, 2017–18, 2018–19, 2019–20, 2020–21, 2021–22, 2022–23, 2024–25, 2025–26
Domestic	DFB-Pokal	21	1956–57, 1965–66, 1966–67, 1968–69, 1970–71, 1981–82, 1983–84, 1985–86, 1997–98, 1999–2000, 2002–03, 2004–05, 2005–06, 2007–08, 2009–10, 2012–13, 2013–14, 2015–16, 2018–19, 2019–20, 2025–26
Domestic	DFB/DFL-Supercup	12	1987, 1990, 2010, 2012, 2016, 2017, 2018, 2020, 2021, 2022, 2025, 2026
Domestic	DFB/DFL-Ligapokal	6	1997, 1998, 1999, 2000, 2004, 2007
Continental	European Cup/UEFA Champions League	6	1973–74, 1974–75, 1975–76, 2000–01, 2012–13, 2019–20
Continental	UEFA Cup/UEFA Europa League	1	1995–96
Continental	UEFA/European Cup Winners' Cup	1	1966–67
Continental	UEFA Super Cup	2	2013, 2020
Worldwide	FIFA Club World Cup	2	2013, 2020
Worldwide	Intercontinental Cup	2	1976, 2001

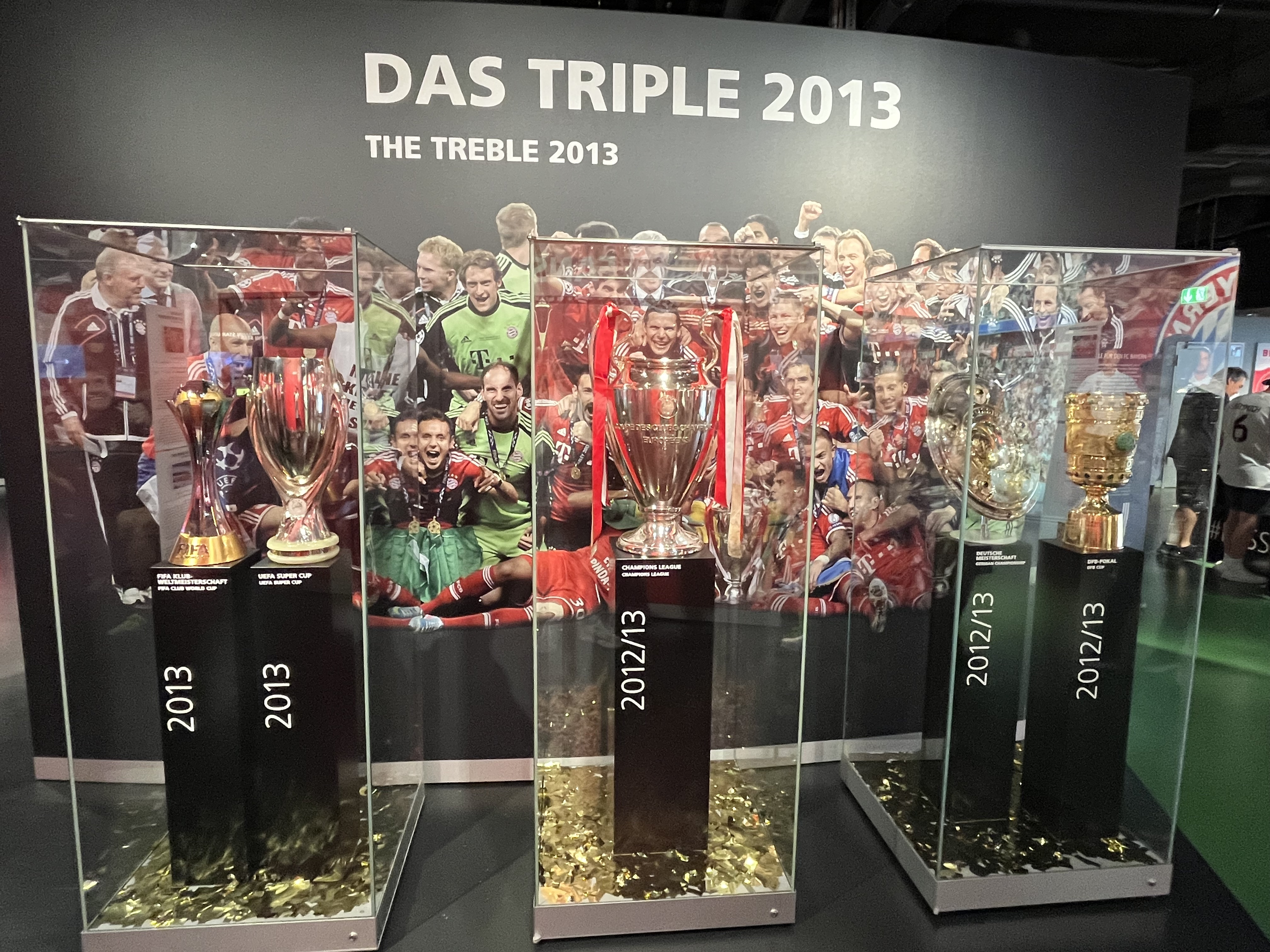
The first Treble won in 2013 on display in the club museum

Since the club's 30th Bundesliga title, its players are allowed to wear a fifth star on their jerseys.

- record

=== Trebles ===
Bayern Munich has completed all available Trebles (seasonal treble, domestic treble and European treble).

- Treble
  - Seasonal treble (Bundesliga, DFB-Pokal, UEFA Champions League)
    - 2012–13, 2019–20
  - European treble (European Cup Winners' Cup, European Cup, UEFA Cup)
    - 1966–67 European Cup Winners' Cup, 1973–74 European Cup, 1995–96 UEFA Cup
  - Domestic treble (Bundesliga, DFB-Pokal, DFB-Ligapokal)
    - 1999–2000

=== Sextuple ===
During each calendar year, Bayern Munich only have six trophies available to them. A sextuple consists of going "six for six" in those competitions, which Bayern accomplished in 2020. This rare feat consists of winning the Continental treble in one season, followed by winning each of the three additional competitions, to which the treble gives a club access in the following season.

- 2020 Sextuple
  - 2019–20 season
    - 2019–20 Bundesliga
    - 2019–20 DFB-Pokal
    - 2019–20 UEFA Champions League
  - 2020–21 season
    - 2020 DFL-Supercup
    - 2020 UEFA Super Cup
    - 2020 FIFA Club World Cup

== Players ==
=== Current squad ===
As of 4 September 2026

Note: Flags indicate national team as defined under FIFA eligibility rules; some limited exceptions apply. Players may hold more than one non-FIFA nationality.

No.	Pos.	Nation	Player
1	GK	GER	Manuel Neuer (captain)
2	DF	FRA	Dayot Upamecano
3	DF	KOR	Kim Min-jae
4	DF	GER	Jonathan Tah
6	MF	GER	Joshua Kimmich (vice-captain)
7	FW	GER	Serge Gnabry
8	MF	GER	Tom Bischof
9	FW	ENG	Harry Kane (3rd captain)
10	MF	GER	Jamal Musiala
11	DF	GER	Nathaniel Brown
14	FW	COL	Luis Díaz
17	FW	FRA	Michael Olise

No.	Pos.	Nation	Player
19	DF	CAN	Alphonso Davies
21	DF	JPN	Hiroki Itō
23	DF	FRA	Sacha Boey
26	GK	GER	Sven Ulreich
27	MF	AUT	Konrad Laimer
34	MF	MAR	Ismael Saibari
39	MF	SEN	Bara Sapoko Ndiaye
40	GK	GER	Jonas Urbig
42	MF	GER	Lennart Karl
44	DF	CRO	Josip Stanišić
45	MF	GER	Aleksandar Pavlović
47	MF	POR	David Santos Daiber

=== Bayern Munich II and Junior Team (FC Bayern Campus) ===
The following current players have been called-up to Bayern Munich squad for any official competition match, and some have officially debuted. They are those who have been promoted from the reserve team squad and the youth sector squads also, with whom they regularly play for. The listed numbers are those being officially assigned to players who are taking part during the current season.

As of 20 November 2026

Note: Flags indicate national team as defined under FIFA eligibility rules; some limited exceptions apply. Players may hold more than one non-FIFA nationality.

No.	Pos.	Nation	Player
30	DF	GER	Cassiano Kiala
35	GK	GER	Jannis Bärtl
36	FW	FRA	Noah Codjo-Evora
38	GK	GER	David Podar-Știube
43	DF	CRO	Filip Pavić
46	FW	GER	Tim Binder
48	FW	GER	Bastian Assomo

No.	Pos.	Nation	Player
49	FW	BRA	Maycon Cardozo
—	GK	GER	Leon Klanac
—	GK	GER	Leonard Prescott
—	DF	GER	Tarek Buchmann
—	DF	GER	Vincent Manuba
—	MF	ITA	Guido Della Rovere
—	MF	KOS	Erblin Osmani

=== Out on loan ===
As of 1 September 2026

Note: Flags indicate national team as defined under FIFA eligibility rules; some limited exceptions apply. Players may hold more than one non-FIFA nationality.

No.	Pos.	Nation	Player
—	DF	TUR	Deniz Ofli (at Karlsruher SC until 30 June 2027)
—	MF	PER	Felipe Chávez (at 1. FC Magdeburg until 30 June 2027)
—	MF	ESP	Javier Fernández (at 1. FC Nürnberg until 30 June 2027)

No.	Pos.	Nation	Player
—	MF	GER	Arijon Ibrahimović (at FC Augsburg until 30 June 2027)
—	FW	ESP	Bryan Zaragoza (at Espanyol until 30 June 2027)

=== Retired numbers ===
- 5 – Franz Beckenbauer, Defender (1964–1977) – posthumous honour
- 12 – "The twelfth man", dedication to fans

=== Notable past players ===

The "Greatest Ever" squad chosen by more than 79,901 fans, in 2005. The coach chosen was Ottmar Hitzfeld.

At his farewell game, Oliver Kahn was declared honorary captain of Bayern Munich. The players below are part of the Bayern Munich Hall of Fame.

1930s

- (Germany) Conrad Heidkamp† (DF)

1970s:

- (Germany) Franz Beckenbauer† (DF)
- (Germany) Gerd Müller† (FW)
- (Germany) Uli Hoeneß (FW)
- (Germany) Paul Breitner (DF/MF)
- (Germany) Sepp Maier (GK)
- (Germany) Hans-Georg Schwarzenbeck (DF)
- (Germany) Franz Roth (MF)

1980s:

- (Germany) Karl-Heinz Rummenigge (FW)
- (Germany) Klaus Augenthaler (DF)

1990s:

- (Germany) Lothar Matthäus (MF/DF)
- (Germany) Stefan Effenberg (MF)

2000s:

- (Germany) Oliver Kahn (GK)
- (Germany) Mehmet Scholl (MF)
- (France) Bixente Lizarazu (DF)
- (Brazil) Giovane Élber (FW)

2010s:

- (Germany) Philipp Lahm (DF)
- (Germany) Bastian Schweinsteiger (MF)

=== Captains ===
Years	Captain
1965	(Germany) Adolf Kunstwadl† (DF)
1965–1970	(Germany) Werner Olk (DF)
1970–1977	(Germany) Franz Beckenbauer† (DF)
1977–1979	(Germany) Sepp Maier (GK)
1979	(Germany) Gerd Müller† (FW)
1979–1980	(Germany) Georg Schwarzenbeck (DF)
1980–1983	(Germany) Paul Breitner (MF)
1983–1984	(Germany) Karl-Heinz Rummenigge (FW)
1984–1991	(Germany) Klaus Augenthaler (DF)
1991–1994	(Germany) Raimond Aumann (GK)
1994–1997	(Germany) Lothar Matthäus (MF/DF)
1997–1999	(Germany) Thomas Helmer (DF)
1999–2002	(Germany) Stefan Effenberg (MF)
2002–2008	(Germany) Oliver Kahn (GK)
2008–2011	(Netherlands) Mark van Bommel (MF)
2011–2017	(Germany) Philipp Lahm (DF)
2017–	(Germany) Manuel Neuer (GK)

== Coaches and management ==
=== Current staff ===
As of 1 July 2026

Coaching staff
(Belgium) Vincent Kompany	Head coach
(England) Aaron Danks (Austria) René Marić (Belgium) Floribert N'Galula (England) Daniel Fradley	Assistant coaches
(Germany) Michael Rechner	Goalkeeper coach
(Austria) Walter Gfrerer	Head of performance
(Germany) Michael Niemeyer	Head of video analysis
(Germany) Michael Cuper	Video analysts
(Germany) Maximilian Schwab	Video analysts
(Germany) Giacomo Stey	Video analysts
(Germany) Patrick Lieb	Video analysts
(Germany) Benjamin Sommer	Fitness coaches
(Italy) Simon Martinello	Fitness coaches
(Austria) Markus Murrer	Fitness coaches
(Germany) Quirin Löppert	Fitness coaches
(Germany) Soner Mansuroglu	Data analyst
Medical department
(Germany) Prof. Dr. Peter Ueblacker	Chief medical officer
(Germany) Dr. Jochen Hahne	Team doctor
(Germany) Prof. Dr. Roland Schmidt	Internist and cardiologist
(Germany) Helmut Erhard	Head of physiotherapy
(Germany) Gerry Hoffmann	Deputy head of physiotherapy
(Germany) Christian Huhn	Physiotherapists
(Germany) Stephan Weickert	Physiotherapists
(Germany) Florian Brandner	Physiotherapists
(Germany) Knut Stamer	Physiotherapists
Sport management and organisation	Physiotherapists
(Austria) Christoph Freund	Sporting director
(Germany) Maciej Jagiellowicz	Team managers
(Germany) Samuel Geiler	Team managers
(Belgium) Rodyse Munienge	Team managers
(Austria) Martin Dellemann	Equipment managers
(Saint Lucia) Lawrence Aimable	Equipment managers
(Germany) Sebastian Pflügler	Equipment managers
(Croatia) Haris Harbaš	Equipment managers
(Germany) Michael Lauerbach	Coach drivers
(Germany) Armin Kriz	Coach drivers

=== Coaches since 1963 ===
Bayern has had 20 coaches since its promotion to the Bundesliga in 1965. Udo Lattek, Giovanni Trapattoni and Ottmar Hitzfeld served two terms as head coach. Franz Beckenbauer served one term as head coach and one as caretaker, while Jupp Heynckes had four separate spells as coach, including one as caretaker.

Hitzfeld was club's most successful coach, having won five Bundesliga titles, two DFB Cups and the Champions League. Lattek is followed closely, winning six Bundesliga titles, two DFB Cups and the European Cup. The club's least successful coach was Søren Lerby, who won less than a third of his matches in charge and presided over the club's near-relegation in the 1991–92 campaign.

No.	Coach	Period			Major titles	Domestic				European				Worldwide	
No.	Coach	from	until	days	Major titles	BL	DP	LP	SC	CL	EL	SC	WC	ICC	CWC
1	(Socialist Federal Republic of Yugoslavia) Zlatko Čajkovski (1923–1998)	1 July 1963	30 June 1968	1,826	3	–	2	–	–	–	–	–	1	–	–
2	(Socialist Federal Republic of Yugoslavia) Branko Zebec (1929–1988)	1 July 1968	13 March 1970	620	2	1	1	–	–	–	–	–	–	–	–
3	(West Germany) Udo Lattek (1935–2015)	14 March 1970	2 January 1975	1,755	5	3	1	–	–	1	–	–	–	–	–
4	(West Germany) Dettmar Cramer (1925–2015)	16 January 1975	30 November 1977	1,049	3	–	–	–	–	2	–	–	–	1	–
5	(Hungary) Gyula Lóránt (1923–1981)	2 December 1977	18 December 1978	453	–	–	–	–	–	–	–	–	–	–	–
6	(Hungary) Pál Csernai (1932–2013)	19 December 1978	16 May 1983	1,537	3	2	1	–	–	–	–	–	–	–	–
7	(West Germany) Reinhard Saftig (caretaker) (1952–)	17 May 1983	30 June 1983	44	–	–	–	–	–	–	–	–	–	–	–
8	(West Germany) Udo Lattek (1935–2015)	1 July 1983	30 June 1987	1,460	5	3	2	–	–	–	–	–	–	–	–
9	(Germany) Jupp Heynckes (1945–)	1 July 1987	8 October 1991	1,560	4	2	–	–	2	–	–	–	–	–	–
10	(Denmark) Søren Lerby (1958–)	9 October 1991	10 March 1992	153	–	–	–	–	–	–	–	–	–	–	–
11	(Germany) Erich Ribbeck (1937–)	11 March 1992	27 December 1993	656	–	–	–	–	–	–	–	–	–	–	–
12	(Germany) Franz Beckenbauer (1945–2024)	28 December 1993	30 June 1994	184	1	1	–	–	–	–	–	–	–	–	–
13	(Italy) Giovanni Trapattoni (1939–)	1 July 1994	30 June 1995	364	–	–	–	–	–	–	–	–	–	–	–
14	(Germany) Otto Rehhagel (1938–)	1 July 1995	27 April 1996	301	–	–	–	–	–	–	–	–	–	–	–
15	(Germany) Franz Beckenbauer (caretaker) (1945–2024)	29 April 1996	15 May 1996	16	1	–	–	–	–	–	1	–	–	–	–
16	(Germany) Klaus Augenthaler (caretaker) (1957–)	16 May 1996	30 June 1996	45	–	–	–	–	–	–	–	–	–	–	–
17	(Italy) Giovanni Trapattoni (1939–)	1 July 1996	30 June 1998	729	3	1	1	1	–	–	–	–	–	–	–
18	(Germany) Ottmar Hitzfeld (1949–)	1 July 1998	30 June 2004	2,191	11	4	2	3	–	1	–	–	–	1	–
19	(Germany) Felix Magath (1953–)	1 July 2004	31 January 2007	944	5	2	2	1	–	–	–	–	–	–	–
20	(Germany) Ottmar Hitzfeld (1949–)	1 February 2007	30 June 2008	515	3	1	1	1	–	–	–	–	–	–	–
21	(Germany) Jürgen Klinsmann (1964–)	1 July 2008	27 April 2009	300	–	–	–	–	–	–	–	–	–	–	–
22	(Germany) Jupp Heynckes (caretaker) (1945–)	28 April 2009	30 June 2009	63	–	–	–	–	–	–	–	–	–	–	–
23	(Netherlands) Louis van Gaal (1951–)	1 July 2009	9 April 2011	647	3	1	1	–	1	–	–	–	–	–	–
24	(Netherlands) Andries Jonker (caretaker) (1962–)	10 April 2011	30 June 2011	81	–	–	–	–	–	–	–	–	–	–	–
25	(Germany) Jupp Heynckes (1945–)	1 July 2011	30 June 2013	730	4	1	1	–	1	1	–	–	–	–	–
26	(Spain) Pep Guardiola (1971–)	1 July 2013	30 June 2016	1,095	7	3	2	–	–	–	–	1	–	–	1
27	(Italy) Carlo Ancelotti (1959–)	1 July 2016	28 September 2017	454	3	1	–	–	2	–	–	–	–	–	–
28	(France) Willy Sagnol (caretaker) (1977–)	29 September 2017	8 October 2017	9	–	–	–	–	–	–	–	–	–	–	–
29	(Germany) Jupp Heynckes (1945–)	9 October 2017	1 July 2018	265	1	1	–	–	–	–	–	–	–	–	–
30	(Croatia) Niko Kovač (1971–)	1 July 2018	3 November 2019	490	3	1	1	–	1	–	–	–	–	–	–
31	(Germany) Hansi Flick (1965–)	3 November 2019	30 June 2021	605	7	2	1	–	1	1	–	1	–	–	1
32	(Germany) Julian Nagelsmann (1987–)	1 July 2021	24 March 2023	631	3	1	–	–	2	–	–	–	–	–	–
33	(Germany) Thomas Tuchel (1973–)	25 March 2023	29 May 2024	431	1	1	–	–	–	–	–	–	–	–	–
34	(Belgium) Vincent Kompany (1986–)	29 May 2024	Present	906	5	2	1	–	2	–	–	–	–	–	–

== Club management ==
=== FC Bayern München AG ===
Supervisory board (Aufsichtsrat) of FC Bayern AG
Members	Notes	Ref.
Herbert Hainer	Chairman; FC Bayern e. V. president	
Jan Heinemann	Adidas AG general counsel and chief compliance officer	
Gernot Döllner	Audi AG executive board chairman	
Michael Diekmann	Chairman of the Supervisory Board of Allianz SE	
Alexander Sixt	Co-CEO of Sixt SE	
Uli Hoeneß	Deputy chairman; FC Bayern e. V. honorary president	
Thorsten Langheim	Deutsche Telekom AG board member	
Dieter Mayer	FC Bayern e. V. senior vice-president	
Karl-Heinz Rummenigge	Former FC Bayern AG chief executive officer	

Executive board (Vorstand) of FC Bayern AG
Members	Position	Ref.
Jan-Christian Dreesen	Chief executive officer	
Max Eberl	Board member for sport	
Rouven Kasper	Board member for marketing and sales	

=== FC Bayern München e. V. ===
Presidium (Präsidium) of FC Bayern e. V.
Members	Position	Ref.
Herbert Hainer	President	
Dieter Mayer	Senior vice-president	
Walter Mennekes	Deputy vice-president	

Advisory board (Verwaltungsbeirat) of FC Bayern e. V.
Members	Position	Ref.
Edmund Stoiber	Honorary chairman	
Alexander Sixt	Chairman	
Alexandra Schörghuber	Deputy chairwoman	
Dorothee Bär	Advisory board member	
Georg Fahrenschon	Advisory board member	
Marion Kiechle	Advisory board member	
Lars Klingbeil	Advisory board member	
Hildegard Müller	Advisory board member	
Elisabeth Promberger	Advisory board member	
Klaus-Peter Röhler	Advisory board member	
Josef Schmid	Advisory board member	
Max Viessmann	Advisory board member	

== Other departments ==
=== Football ===
The reserve team, FC Bayern Munich II, serves mainly as the final stepping stone for promising young players before being promoted to the main team. The team competes in the Regionalliga Bayern, the fourth level of German football. Their greatest achievement to date was winning the 3. Liga in the 2019–20 season. Since the inception of the Regionalliga in 1994, the team played in the Regionalliga Süd, after playing in the Oberliga since 1978. In the 2007–08 season, they qualified for the newly founded 3. Liga, where they lasted until 2011 when they were relegated to the Regionalliga. This ended 33 consecutive years of playing in the highest league that the German Football Association permits the second team of a professional football team to play.

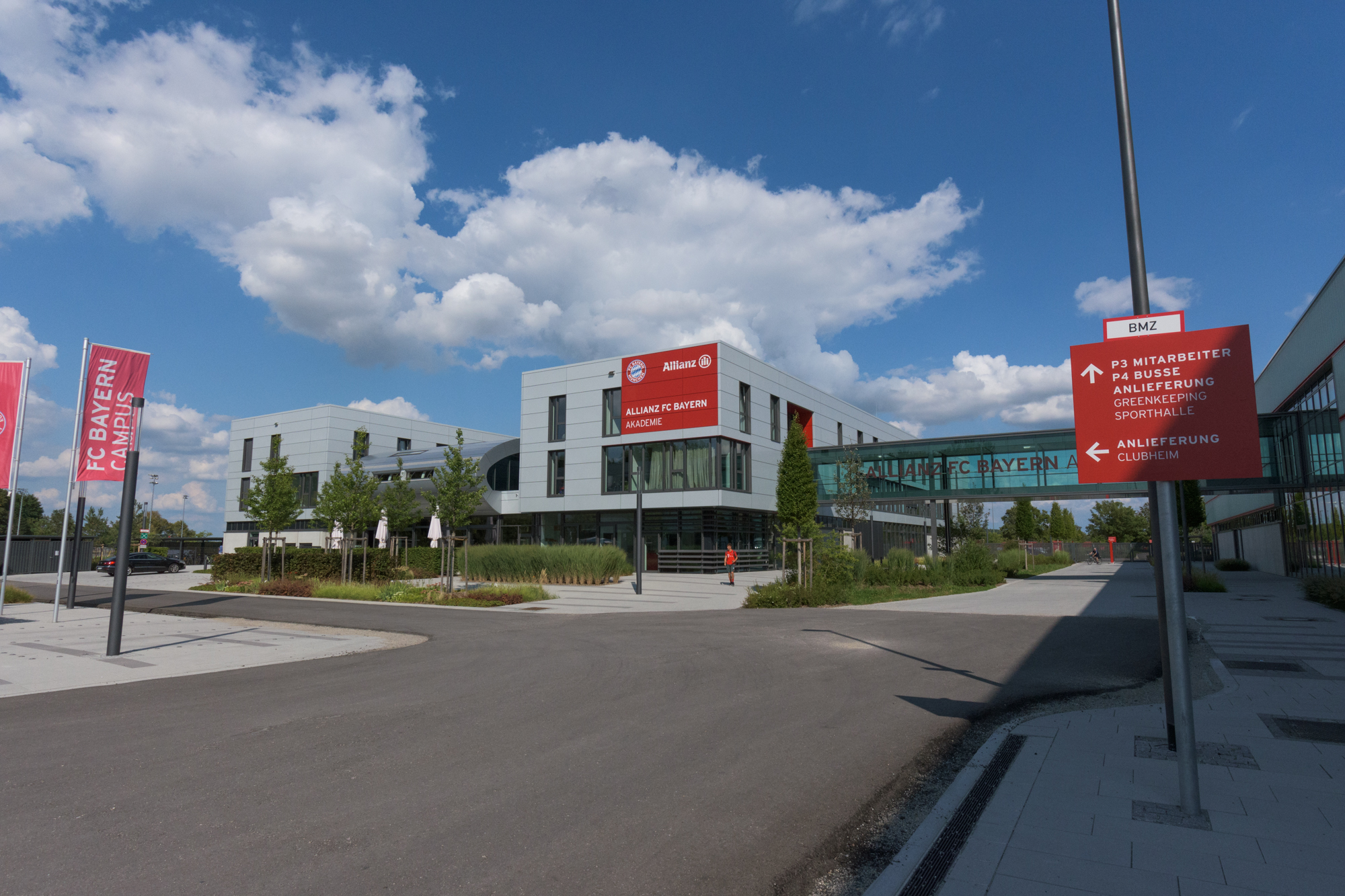
The FC Bayern Academy at the campus in Munich

The youth academy has produced some of Europe's top football players, including Thomas Hitzlsperger, Owen Hargreaves, Philipp Lahm, Bastian Schweinsteiger and Thomas Müller. On 1 August 2017, the FC Bayern Campus became the new home of the youth teams. It consists of ten teams, with the youngest being under 9. Jochen Sauer is the FC Bayern Campus director, and Bayern legend coach Hermann Gerland is the sporting director.

The women's football department consists of five teams, including a professional team, a reserve team, and two youth teams. The women's first team, which is led by head coach Thomas Wörle, features several members of the German national youth team. In the 2008–09 season, the team finished second in the women's Bundesliga. The division was founded in 1970 and consisted of four teams with 90 players. Their greatest successes were winning the championships in 1976, 2015, and 2016.

In the 2011–12 season on 12 May 2012, FC Bayern Munich dethroned the German Cup title holders 1. FFC Frankfurt with a 2–0 in the 2011–12 final in Cologne and celebrated the biggest success of the club's history since winning the championship in 1976. In 2015, they won the Bundesliga for the first time, without any defeat. They won the 2015–16 Bundesliga for the second consecutive time.

The senior football department was founded in 2002 and consists of five teams. The division is intended to enable senior athletes to participate in the various senior citizen competitions in Munich. The FC Bayern AllStars were founded in summer 2006, and consists of former Bayern players, including Klaus Augenthaler, Raimond Aumann, Andreas Brehme, Paul Breitner, Hans Pflügler, Stefan Reuter, Paulo Sérgio, and Olaf Thon. The team is coached by Wolfgang Dremmler, and plays matches with other senior teams around the world. For organisational reasons, the team can only play a limited number of games annually. The refereeing department was established in 1919 and is currently the largest football refereeing division in Europe, with 110 referees, with 2 of them women. The referees mainly officiate amateur games in the local Munich leagues.

=== Other sports ===
Bayern has other departments for a variety of sports.

The basketball department was founded in 1946, and currently contains 26 teams, including four men's teams, three women's teams, sixteen youth teams, and three senior teams. The men's team are five-time German champions, having won in 1954, 1955, 2014, 2018, 2019, 2024 and 2025. The team also won the German Basketball Cup in 1968, 2018, 2021, 2023 and 2024. The team plays its home games at the Rudi-Sedlmayer-Halle, located in the Sendling-Westpark borough of Munich.

The bowling department emerged from SKC Real-Isaria in 1983 and currently consists of five teams. Directly next to the well-known club building of the football department, the team plays at the bowling alley of the Münchner Kegler-Verein. The first team plays in the second highest division of the Münchner Spielklasse Bezirksliga.

The chess department was created in 1908 and consists of nine teams, including seven men's teams and two women's teams. The men's team, which currently plays in the Chess Bundesliga following promotion in 2013 from the 2. Bundesliga Ost, was nine-time German Champion from 1983 to 1995. The team also won the European Chess Club Cup in 1992. The women currently play in the 2. Bundesliga with their biggest successes being promotion to the Frauenbundesliga in 2016 and 2018.

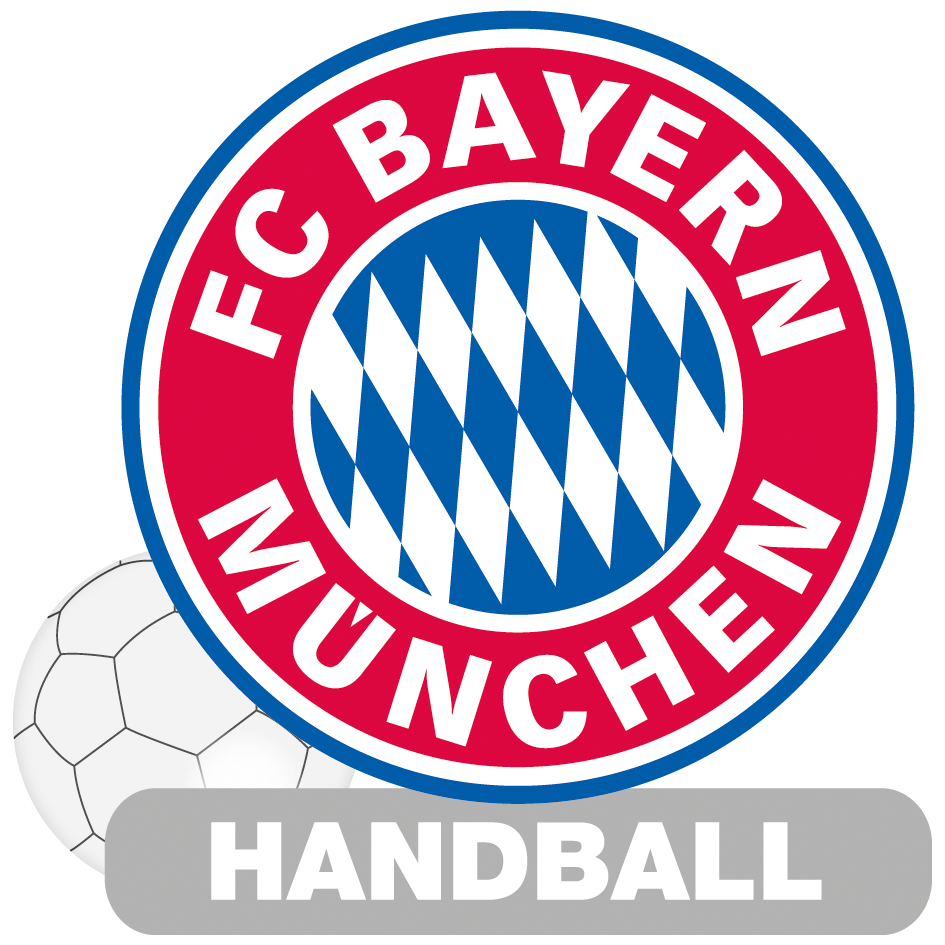
The logo of the handball department

The handball department was founded in 1945, and consists of thirteen teams, including three men's teams, two women's teams, five boys teams, two girls teams, and a mixed youth team. The first men's team plays in the Bezirksoberliga Oberbayern, while the women's first teams plays in the Bezirksliga Oberbayern.

The table tennis department was founded in 1946 and currently has 220 members. The club currently has fourteen teams, including eight men's teams, a women's team, three youth teams, and two children teams. The women's first team is currently playing in the Landesliga Süd/Ost, while the men's first team plays in the 3. Bundesliga Süd. The focus of the department is on youth support.

== Literature ==
- Hüetlin, Thomas: Gute Freunde. Die wahre Geschichte des FC Bayern München. Blessing, München 2006. ISBN 3-89667-254-1.
- Schulze-Marmeling, Dietrich: Der FC Bayern und seine Juden. Aufstieg und Zerschlagung einer liberalen Fußballkultur. Verlag Die Werkstatt, Göttingen 2011. ISBN 978-3-89533-781-9.
- Bausenwein, Christoph, Schulze-Marmeling, Dietrich: FC Bayern München. Unser Verein, unsere Geschichte. Verlag Die Werkstatt, Göttingen 2012. ISBN 978-3-89533-894-6.

== See also ==
- List of world champion football clubs
