= Stern des Südens =

Song

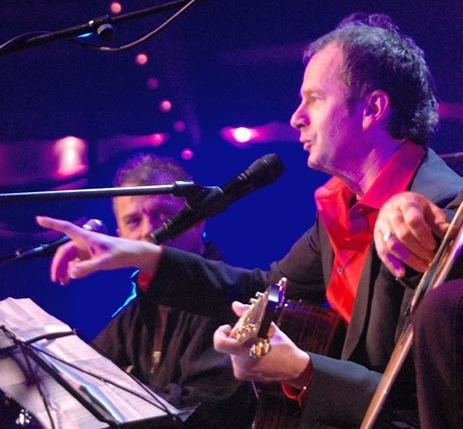

"Stern des Südens" is a song written by German songwriter Willy Astor together with radio host Stephan Lehmann and it is the club anthem sung during games at FC Bayern Munich's home stadium, the Allianz Arena. Its title in English means "Star of the South". It has been translated into twelve languages.
