= Bayern-luck =

Myth about football in Germany

Bayern-luck, originally Bayern-Dusel (derived from German: Dusel, lit. undeserved luck), is a widespread myth about football in Germany. According to the proverbial expression, record winning Bayern Munich often wins at the last minute. The expression has been used since the 1970s and is often used as a catchphrase with regard to other teams and circumstances.

== Point of view of FC Bayern players and officials ==
Oliver Kahn, after a last minute win against Hannover 96, stated that there is no luck for free, you have to enforce it. Bastian Schweinsteiger commented upon a narrowly won game against Hamburger SV in February 2004, saying "Bayerndusel is back! (Der Bayern-Dusel ist wieder da!)"

However, when Uli Hoeneß was asked by a "FCB TV" reporter about the Bayern-Dusel being the reason for a last-minute win against Karlsruher SC, he reacted by threatening to sack the reporter on the spot.

== Theoretical background ==
Christian Schütte described the Bayern Dusel as being the result of cognitive bias, while others presume the claimed luck to be based on a higher self-confidence and better physical training of Bayern players.

Journalist Alex Feuerherdt postulated the Chit Chat about the Bayerndusel as a superficially harmless tirade that has nonetheless a certain background in the History of FC Bayern Munich.
