= Herbert Hainer =

German businessman

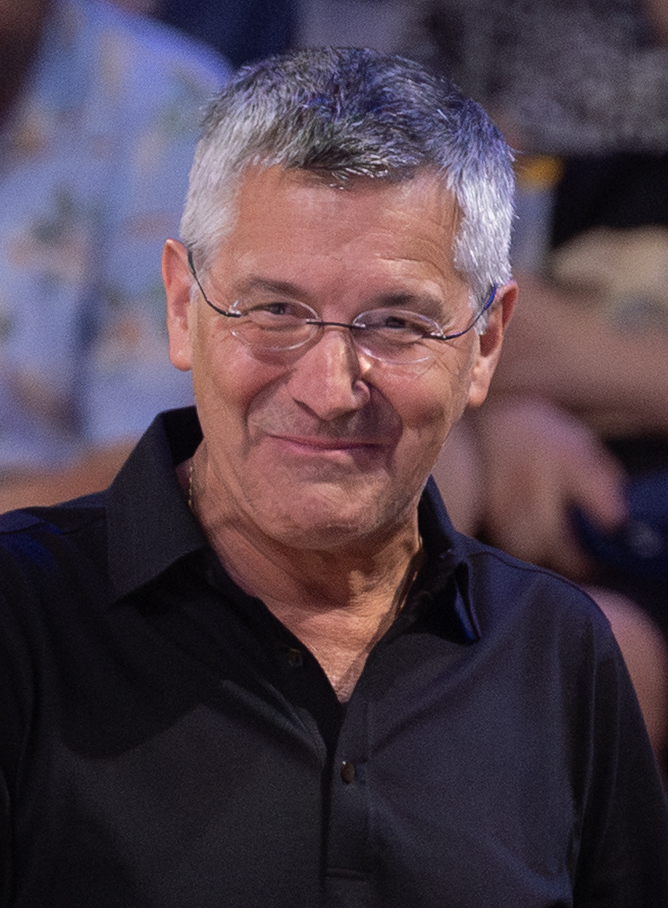
- Born: 3 July 1954 (age 72); Dingolfing, Bavaria, West Germany
- Education: University of Applied Sciences Landshut
- Relatives: Adidas (former CEO); Bayern Munich (supervisory board chairman); Bayern Munich (president)

Herbert Hainer (born 3 July 1954) is a German businessman and the former CEO of Adidas-Group, as well as supervisory board chairman of the Bayern Munich. He is currently the president of football of Bundesliga club Bayern Munich.

== Education ==
Hainer was educated at the University of Applied Sciences Landshut, where he graduated in business administration.

== Career ==
Hainer was Division Manager Sales and Marketing for Procter & Gamble Germany between 1979 and 1987 before moving to adidas Germany. There, he worked as Sales Director Hardware (1987–1989), Sales Director Field (1989–1991), National Sales Director (1991–1993) and Managing Director Sales (1993–1995). He was then Senior Vice President Region Europe, Africa, Middle East (1996–1997) and Member of the Executive Board (1997–1999) for adidas AG and Deputy Chairman of the Executive Board. (1999–2001) for adidas-Salomon AG. In 2001, he became CEO and Chairman of the Executive Board (2001–2016) for adidas-group AG.

Hainer was named a trustee of the Bundesliga Foundation at the DFL's New Year reception. He served as Chairman interim of Bayern Munich from 13 March 2014 to 2 May 2014. On 15 November 2019, Hainer was elected the president of Bayern Munich. He succeeded Uli Hoeneß as Bayern's president. On 15 October 2022, Hainer was re-elected as Bayern president during their annual general meeting, with 78% of the votes in favour of him.
