= 2008 DFB-Pokal final =

- Match programme cover
- Event: 2007–08 DFB-Pokal
Borussia Dortmund	Bayern Munich
1	2
- After extra time
- Date: 19 April 2008
- Venue: Olympiastadion, Berlin
- Referee: Knut Kircher (Rottenburg)
- Attendance: 74,500
- Weather: Mostly cloudy 8 °C (46 °F); 62% humidity

The 2008 DFB-Pokal final decided the winner of the 2007–08 DFB-Pokal, the 65th season of Germany's premier knockout football cup competition. The match took place on 19 April 2008 between thirteen-time winners Bayern München and two-time winners Borussia Dortmund. The final was played in front of over 70,000 at Berlin's Olympiastadion.

Bayern ran out 2–1 winners after extra time thanks to two strikes from Italian forward Luca Toni, gaining their 14th DFB-Pokal title and the first trophy of an eventual league and cup double.

== Route to the final ==
The DFB-Pokal began with 64 teams in a single-elimination knockout cup competition. There were a total of five rounds leading up to the final. Teams were drawn against each other, and the winner after 90 minutes advanced. If still tied, 30 minutes of extra time were played. If the score was still level, a penalty shoot-out was used to determine the winner.

Note: In all results below, the score of the finalist is given first (H: home; A: away).

Borussia Dortmund		Round	Bayern Munich	
Opponent	Result	2007–08 DFB-Pokal	Opponent	Result
1. FC Magdeburg (A)	4–1	First round	Wacker Burghausen (A)	1–1 (a.e.t.) (4–3 p)
Eintracht Frankfurt (H)	2–1	Second round	Borussia Mönchengladbach (H)	3–1
Werder Bremen (H)	2–1	Round of 16	Wuppertaler SV Borussia (A)	5–2
1899 Hoffenheim (H)	3–1	Quarter-finals	1860 Munich (H)	1–0 (a.e.t.)
Carl Zeiss Jena (H)	3–0	Semi-finals	VfL Wolfsburg (H)	2–0

== Match ==
=== Details ===
19 April 2008
20:00 CEST

Borussia Dortmund	1–2 (a.e.t.)	Bayern Munich
Petrić 90+2'	Report	Toni 11', 103'

Olympiastadion, Berlin
Attendance: 74,500
Referee: Knut Kircher (Rottenburg)

Borussia Dortmund	Bayern Munich

GK	20	(Germany) Marc Ziegler
RB	14	(Serbia) Antonio Rukavina	(yellow card) 62'	(substituted off) 79'
CB	4	(Germany) Christian Wörns (c)
CB	21	(Croatia) Robert Kovač	(yellow card) 19'
LB	17	(Brazil) Dedé
DM	5	(Germany) Sebastian Kehl		(substituted off) 86'
CM	7	(Brazil) Tinga	(yellow card) 37'
CM	6	(Germany) Florian Kringe
RF	16	(Poland) Jakub Błaszczykowski	(yellow card) 89' (yellow-red card) 108'
CF	13	(Switzerland) Alexander Frei	(yellow card) 38'	(substituted off) 71'
LF	10	(Croatia) Mladen Petrić	(yellow card) 96'
Substitutes:
GK	41	(Germany) Alexander Bade
DF	2	(Germany) Martin Amedick
DF	15	(Germany) Mats Hummels
MF	22	(Germany) Marc-André Kruska
MF	26	(South Africa) Delron Buckley		(substituted on) 79'
FW	9	(Paraguay) Nelson Valdez		(substituted on) 86'
FW	19	(Argentina) Diego Klimowicz	(yellow card) 114'	(substituted on) 71'
Manager:
(Germany) Thomas Doll

GK	1	(Germany) Oliver Kahn (c)
RB	30	(Germany) Christian Lell
CB	3	(Brazil) Lúcio
CB	6	(Argentina) Martín Demichelis
LB	21	(Germany) Philipp Lahm
RM	31	(Germany) Bastian Schweinsteiger		(substituted off) 86'
CM	17	(Netherlands) Mark van Bommel
CM	15	(Brazil) Zé Roberto	(yellow card) 111'	(substituted off) 113'
LM	7	(France) Franck Ribéry
CF	18	(Germany) Miroslav Klose		(substituted off) 69'
CF	9	(Italy) Luca Toni	(yellow card) 120'
Substitutes:
GK	22	(Germany) Michael Rensing
DF	2	(France) Willy Sagnol		(substituted on) 86'
DF	5	(Belgium) Daniel Van Buyten
DF	23	(Germany) Marcell Jansen
MF	16	(Germany) Andreas Ottl		(substituted on) 113'
MF	20	(Argentina) José Sosa
FW	11	(Germany) Lukas Podolski		(substituted on) 69'
Manager:
(Germany) Ottmar Hitzfeld

Assistant referees:
Jan-Hendrik Salver (Stuttgart)
Volker Wezel (Tübingen)
Fourth official:
Markus Schmidt (Stuttgart)

Match rules

- 90 minutes.
- 30 minutes of extra time if necessary.
- Penalty shoot-out if scores still level.
- Seven named substitutes, of which up to three may be used.
