= 2014 DFB-Pokal final =

- Match programme cover
- Event: 2013–14 DFB-Pokal
Borussia Dortmund	Bayern Munich
0	2
- After extra time
- Date: 17 May 2014
- Venue: Olympiastadion, Berlin
- Man of the Match: Arjen Robben (Bayern Munich)
- Referee: Florian Meyer (Burgdorf)
- Attendance: 76,197
- Weather: Mostly cloudy 17 °C (63 °F); 21% humidity

The 2014 DFB-Pokal final decided the winner of the 2013–14 DFB-Pokal, the 71st season of Germany's premier football cup. It was played on 17 May at the Olympiastadion in Berlin.

In the final, Borussia Dortmund played Bayern Munich. The winners would have earned a place in the group stage of the 2014–15 UEFA Europa League, but both teams had already qualified for the 2014–15 UEFA Champions League via their league positions. Because of this, the three Europa League spots were passed down through league positions. This was the last season in which the cup runners-up would have qualified for the Europa League if the winners had already qualified for the Champions League. The winners also earned the right to play in the 2014 DFL-Supercup; as Bayern had already won the Bundesliga, Borussia Dortmund became their opponents regardless of the result due to them also finishing as league runners-up.

It was Dortmund's sixth final, of which they had won three, including their most recent in 2012 against Bayern. Bayern were the defending champions, and it was their 20th final.

Bayern Munich won a record 17th title, after defeating Dortmund 2–0 after extra time.

== Route to the final ==
The DFB-Pokal began with 64 teams in a single-elimination knockout cup competition. There were a total of five rounds leading up to the final. Teams were drawn against each other, and the winner after 90 minutes advanced. If still tied, 30 minutes of extra time were played. If the score was still level, a penalty shoot-out was used to determine the winner.

Note: In all results below, the score of the finalist is given first (H: home; A: away).

Borussia Dortmund		Round	Bayern Munich	
Opponent	Result	2013–14 DFB-Pokal	Opponent	Result
SV Wilhelmshaven (A)	3–0	First round	Schwarz-Weiß Rehden (A)	5–0
1860 Munich (A)	2–0 (a.e.t.)	Second round	Hannover 96 (H)	4–1
1. FC Saarbrücken (A)	2–0	Round of 16	FC Augsburg (A)	2–0
Eintracht Frankfurt (A)	1–0	Quarter-finals	Hamburger SV (A)	5–0
VfL Wolfsburg (H)	2–0	Semi-finals	1. FC Kaiserslautern (H)	5–1

=== Borussia Dortmund ===
Dortmund, of the Bundesliga, began their cup campaign on 3 August 2013, with a 3–0 away win over fourth-tier SV Wilhelmshaven, with three goals in the last 20 minutes from Kevin Großkreutz, Marvin Ducksch and Robert Lewandowski. In the second round, away to 1860 München at the Allianz Arena, the game was goalless after 90 minutes. Dortmund advanced with extra-time goals from Pierre-Emerick Aubameyang and Henrikh Mkhitaryan. In Round 3, away to 1. FC Saarbrücken of the 3. Liga, Dortmund won with goals from Julian Schieber and Jonas Hofmann. In the quarterfinals, Dortmund travelled to Eintracht Frankfurt, their first top-flight opponents of the campaign, winning by a late Aubameyang strike. Their semifinal was their only home game of the run, won 2–0 on 15 April 2014 against VfL Wolfsburg with goals from Mkhitaryan and Lewandowski.

=== Bayern Munich ===
Bayern Munich played their first-round match on 5 August 2013, away to fourth-tier BSV Schwarz-Weiß Rehden, Thomas Müller scoring a hat-trick in a 5–0 win with the other goals by Xherdan Shaqiri and Arjen Robben. In the second round, they faced fellow Bundesliga team Hannover 96 at home, winning 4–1 with a Müller double and goals by Claudio Pizarro and Franck Ribéry. Their third-round match was away to FC Augsburg, with Müller and Robben scoring to put Bayern into the quarterfinals. There they played Hamburger SV away, and won 5–0, with a Mario Mandžukić hat-trick as well as goals by Dante and Robben. Bayern played at home in the semifinal on 16 April, and beat 1. FC Kaiserslautern 5–1, with the goals shared between Bastian Schweinsteiger, Toni Kroos, Müller, Mandžukić and Mario Götze.

== Pre-match ==
Bayern Munich were without Thiago due to a knee ligament injury that he received in March. The Saturday before the final, midfielder Bastian Schweinsteiger strained a tendon in his left knee against VfB Stuttgart, ruling him out. Bayern's top scorer of the season, Mario Mandžukić, was dropped from the team and did not travel to Berlin to the final. Manager Pep Guardiola said "Basti is injured, a problem with his knee. Mandzukic is my decision. He was fit, he could play but we have 18 players and I will play with them".

Borussia Dortmund striker Robert Lewandowski, who had agreed to join Bayern Munich at the end of the season, was excused from some training for the final as a precaution to injury. Manager Jürgen Klopp said "We were very careful with him".

== Match ==
=== Details ===
17 May 2014
20:00 CEST

Borussia Dortmund	0–2 (a.e.t.)	Bayern Munich
	Report	Robben 107'; Müller 120+3'

Olympiastadion, Berlin
Attendance: 76,197
Referee: Florian Meyer (Burgdorf)

Borussia Dortmund	Bayern Munich

GK	1	(Germany) Roman Weidenfeller (c)
RB	26	(Poland) Łukasz Piszczek
CB	25	(Greece) Sokratis Papastathopoulos
CB	15	(Germany) Mats Hummels
LB	29	(Germany) Marcel Schmelzer
CM	14	(Serbia) Miloš Jojić	(substituted off) 83'
CM	18	(Turkey) Nuri Şahin
RW	10	(Armenia) Henrikh Mkhitaryan	(substituted off) 60'
AM	11	(Germany) Marco Reus
LW	19	(Germany) Kevin Großkreutz	(substituted off) 110'
CF	9	(Poland) Robert Lewandowski
Substitutes:
GK	33	(Germany) Zlatan Alomerović
DF	2	(Germany) Manuel Friedrich
DF	37	(Germany) Erik Durm
MF	5	(Germany) Sebastian Kehl
MF	7	(Germany) Jonas Hofmann	(substituted on) 110'
MF	21	(Germany) Oliver Kirch	(substituted on) 60'
FW	17	(Gabon) Pierre-Emerick Aubameyang	(substituted on) 83'
Manager:
(Germany) Jürgen Klopp

GK	1	(Germany) Manuel Neuer
RB	21	(Germany) Philipp Lahm (c)		(substituted off) 31'
CB	17	(Germany) Jérôme Boateng	(yellow card) 67'
CB	4	(Brazil) Dante
LB	13	(Brazil) Rafinha
DM	8	(Spain) Javi Martínez
CM	34	(Denmark) Pierre-Emile Højbjerg	(yellow card) 63'	(substituted off) 102'
CM	39	(Germany) Toni Kroos	(yellow card) 52'
RW	10	(Netherlands) Arjen Robben	(yellow card) 117'
CF	25	(Germany) Thomas Müller
LW	19	(Germany) Mario Götze
Substitutes:
GK	32	(Germany) Lukas Raeder
DF	5	(Belgium) Daniel Van Buyten	(yellow card) 115'	(substituted on) 102'
DF	26	(Germany) Diego Contento
MF	7	(France) Franck Ribéry		(substituted on) 31' (substituted off) 109'
MF	11	(Switzerland) Xherdan Shaqiri
FW	14	(Peru) Claudio Pizarro		(substituted on) 109'
Manager:
(Spain) Pep Guardiola

Man of the Match:
Arjen Robben (Bayern Munich)

Assistant referees:
Frank Willenborg (Osnabrück)
Christoph Bornhorst (Damme)
Fourth official:
Christian Dingert (Lebecksmühle)

Match rules

- 90 minutes.
- 30 minutes of extra time if necessary.
- Penalty shoot-out if scores still level.
- Seven named substitutes, of which up to three may be used.
