= List of DFB-Pokal finals =

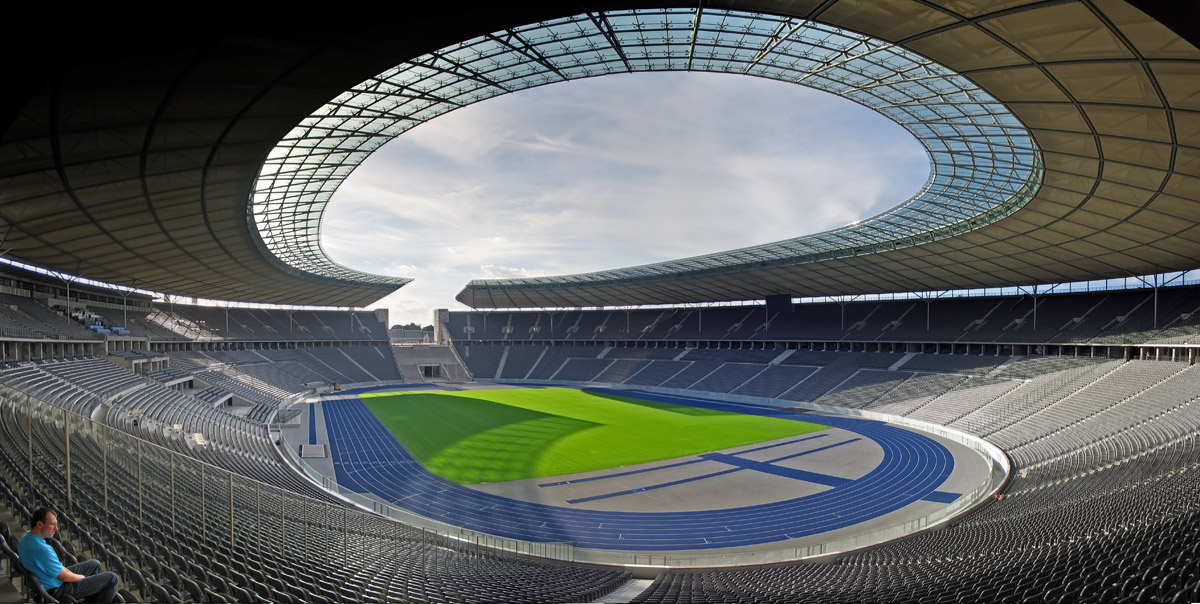
The Olympiastadion in Berlin has hosted the final since 1985

The list of DFB-Pokal finals contains all of the finals of the DFB-Pokal since the introduction of the competition as the Tschammerpokal in 1935.

The finals of the DFB-Pokal usually take place at the end of each German football season. In some cases, like 1970 and 1974, the finals were held at the beginning of the following season due to the FIFA World Cup. The exact date has changed repeatedly over the years. Until 1984, the final was held at various venues, most often in Frankfurt, Stuttgart, Hanover, or Düsseldorf.

Since 1985, the Olympiastadion in Berlin has been the fixed venue for the finals. This will remain at least until 2020, as the DFB and the city of Berlin agreed on an extension to the contract expiring in 2015.

After the introduction of the DFB-Pokal der Frauen in 1981 until 2009, the women's final has taken place immediately before the men's final in the same stadium (since 1985 the Olympiastadion), barring the 1983 finals.

There has only been one derby in the cup final, which took place in 1983 between Cologne clubs 1. FC Köln and Fortuna Köln. The match took place in Cologne. Also, only once has the cup final required a replay, which took place in 1977. Two days' rest was given to the players after the first match ended in a 1–1 draw extra time. Eventually, the rules were changed to require a penalty shoot-out in the case of the scores remaining level after extra time. The first penalty shoot-out in a final took place in 1984.

== Finals ==
DFB-Pokal finals
Season	Winners	Score	Runners-up	Venue	Attendance
1935	1. FC Nürnberg	2–0	Schalke 04	Rheinstadion, Düsseldorf	60,000
1936	VfB Leipzig	2–1	Schalke 04	Olympiastadion, Berlin	70,000
1937	Schalke 04	2–1	Fortuna Düsseldorf	Müngersdorfer Stadion, Cologne	72,000
1938	Rapid Wien	3–1	FSV Frankfurt	Olympiastadion, Berlin	40,000
1939	1. FC Nürnberg	2–0	Waldhof Mannheim	Olympiastadion, Berlin	60,000
1940	Dresdner SC	2–1 (a.e.t.)	1. FC Nürnberg	Olympiastadion, Berlin	60,000
1941	Dresdner SC	2–1	Schalke 04	Olympiastadion, Berlin	65,000
1942	1860 Munich	2–0	Schalke 04	Olympiastadion, Berlin	80,000
1943	First Vienna	3–2 (a.e.t.)	LSV Hamburg	Adolf-Hitler-Kampfbahn, Stuttgart	45,000
1952–53	Rot-Weiss Essen	2–1	Alemannia Aachen	Rheinstadion, Düsseldorf	37,000
1953–54	VfB Stuttgart	1–0 (a.e.t.)	1. FC Köln	Südweststadion, Ludwigshafen	60,000
1954–55	Karlsruher SC	3–2	Schalke 04	Eintracht-Stadion, Braunschweig	25,000
1955–56	Karlsruher SC	3–1	Hamburger SV	Wildparkstadion, Karlsruhe	25,000
1956–57	Bayern Munich	1–0	Fortuna Düsseldorf	Rosenaustadion, Augsburg	44,000
1957–58	VfB Stuttgart	4–3 (a.e.t.)	Fortuna Düsseldorf	Auestadion, Kassel	28,000
1958–59	Schwarz-Weiß Essen (II)	5–2	Borussia Neunkirchen	Auestadion, Kassel	20,000
1959–60	Borussia Mönchengladbach	3–2	Karlsruher SC	Rheinstadion, Düsseldorf	49,000
1960–61	Werder Bremen	2–0	1. FC Kaiserslautern	Glückauf-Kampfbahn, Gelsenkirchen	18,000
1961–62	1. FC Nürnberg	2–1 (a.e.t.)	Fortuna Düsseldorf	Niedersachsenstadion, Hanover	41,000
1962–63	Hamburger SV	3–0	Borussia Dortmund	Niedersachsenstadion, Hanover	68,000
1963–64	1860 Munich	2–0	Eintracht Frankfurt	Neckarstadion, Stuttgart	45,000
1964–65	Borussia Dortmund	2–0	Alemannia Aachen (II)	Niedersachsenstadion, Hanover	55,000
1965–66	Bayern Munich	4–2	Meidericher SV	Waldstadion, Frankfurt	60,000
1966–67	Bayern Munich	4–0	Hamburger SV	Neckarstadion, Stuttgart	68,000
1967–68	1. FC Köln	4–1	VfL Bochum (II)	Südweststadion, Ludwigshafen	60,000
1968–69	Bayern Munich	2–1	Schalke 04	Waldstadion, Frankfurt	64,000
1969–70	Kickers Offenbach (II)	2–1	1. FC Köln	Niedersachsenstadion, Hanover	50,000
1970–71	Bayern Munich	2–1 (a.e.t.)	1. FC Köln	Neckarstadion, Stuttgart	71,000
1971–72	Schalke 04	5–0	1. FC Kaiserslautern	Niedersachsenstadion, Hanover	61,000
1972–73	Borussia Mönchengladbach	2–1 (a.e.t.)	1. FC Köln	Rheinstadion, Düsseldorf	69,600
1973–74	Eintracht Frankfurt	3–1 (a.e.t.)	Hamburger SV	Rheinstadion, Düsseldorf	52,800
1974–75	Eintracht Frankfurt	1–0	MSV Duisburg	Niedersachsenstadion, Hanover	43,000
1975–76	Hamburger SV	2–0	1. FC Kaiserslautern	Waldstadion, Frankfurt	61,000
1976–77	1. FC Köln	1–1 (a.e.t.)	Hertha BSC	Niedersachsenstadion, Hanover	54,000
1976–77	1. FC Köln	1–0 (replay)	Hertha BSC	Niedersachsenstadion, Hanover	35,000
1977–78	1. FC Köln	2–0	Fortuna Düsseldorf	Parkstadion, Gelsenkirchen	70,000
1978–79	Fortuna Düsseldorf	1–0 (a.e.t.)	Hertha BSC	Niedersachsenstadion, Hanover	56,000
1979–80	Fortuna Düsseldorf	2–1	1. FC Köln	Parkstadion, Gelsenkirchen	65,000
1980–81	Eintracht Frankfurt	3–1	1. FC Kaiserslautern	Neckarstadion, Stuttgart	71,000
1981–82	Bayern Munich	4–2	1. FC Nürnberg	Waldstadion, Frankfurt	61,000
1982–83	1. FC Köln	1–0	Fortuna Köln (II)	Müngersdorfer Stadion, Cologne	61,000
1983–84	Bayern Munich	1–1 (a.e.t.) (7–6 p)	Borussia Mönchengladbach	Waldstadion, Frankfurt	61,146
1984–85	Bayer Uerdingen	2–1	Bayern Munich	Olympiastadion, West Berlin	70,398
1985–86	Bayern Munich	5–2	VfB Stuttgart	Olympiastadion, West Berlin	76,000
1986–87	Hamburger SV	3–1	Stuttgarter Kickers (II)	Olympiastadion, West Berlin	76,000
1987–88	Eintracht Frankfurt	1–0	VfL Bochum	Olympiastadion, West Berlin	76,000
1988–89	Borussia Dortmund	4–1	Werder Bremen	Olympiastadion, West Berlin	76,000
1989–90	1. FC Kaiserslautern	3–2	Werder Bremen	Olympiastadion, West Berlin	76,391
1990–91	Werder Bremen	1–1 (a.e.t.) (4–3 p)	1. FC Köln	Olympiastadion, Berlin	73,000
1991–92	Hannover 96 (II)	0–0 (a.e.t.) (4–3 p)	Borussia Mönchengladbach	Olympiastadion, Berlin	76,200
1992–93	Bayer Leverkusen	1–0	Hertha BSC Amateure (III)	Olympiastadion, Berlin	76,391
1993–94	Werder Bremen	3–1	Rot-Weiss Essen (II)	Olympiastadion, Berlin	76,391
1994–95	Borussia Mönchengladbach	3–0	VfL Wolfsburg (II)	Olympiastadion, Berlin	75,717
1995–96	1. FC Kaiserslautern	1–0	Karlsruher SC	Olympiastadion, Berlin	75,800
1996–97	VfB Stuttgart	2–0	Energie Cottbus (III)	Olympiastadion, Berlin	76,400
1997–98	Bayern Munich	2–1	MSV Duisburg	Olympiastadion, Berlin	75,800
1998–99	Werder Bremen	1–1 (a.e.t.) (5–4 p)	Bayern Munich	Olympiastadion, Berlin	75,841
1999–2000	Bayern Munich	3–0	Werder Bremen	Olympiastadion, Berlin	76,000
2000–01	Schalke 04	2–0	Union Berlin (III)	Olympiastadion, Berlin	73,011
2001–02	Schalke 04	4–2	Bayer Leverkusen	Olympiastadion, Berlin	70,000
2002–03	Bayern Munich	3–1	1. FC Kaiserslautern	Olympiastadion, Berlin	70,490
2003–04	Werder Bremen	3–2	Alemannia Aachen (II)	Olympiastadion, Berlin	71,682
2004–05	Bayern Munich	2–1	Schalke 04	Olympiastadion, Berlin	74,349
2005–06	Bayern Munich	1–0	Eintracht Frankfurt	Olympiastadion, Berlin	74,349
2006–07	1. FC Nürnberg	3–2 (a.e.t.)	VfB Stuttgart	Olympiastadion, Berlin	74,220
2007–08	Bayern Munich	2–1 (a.e.t.)	Borussia Dortmund	Olympiastadion, Berlin	74,244
2008–09	Werder Bremen	1–0	Bayer Leverkusen	Olympiastadion, Berlin	72,244
2009–10	Bayern Munich	4–0	Werder Bremen	Olympiastadion, Berlin	75,420
2010–11	Schalke 04	5–0	MSV Duisburg (II)	Olympiastadion, Berlin	75,708
2011–12	Borussia Dortmund	5–2	Bayern Munich	Olympiastadion, Berlin	75,708
2012–13	Bayern Munich	3–2	VfB Stuttgart	Olympiastadion, Berlin	75,420
2013–14	Bayern Munich	2–0 (a.e.t.)	Borussia Dortmund	Olympiastadion, Berlin	76,197
2014–15	VfL Wolfsburg	3–1	Borussia Dortmund	Olympiastadion, Berlin	75,815
2015–16	Bayern Munich	0–0 (a.e.t.) (4–3 p)	Borussia Dortmund	Olympiastadion, Berlin	74,322
2016–17	Borussia Dortmund	2–1	Eintracht Frankfurt	Olympiastadion, Berlin	74,322
2017–18	Eintracht Frankfurt	3–1	Bayern Munich	Olympiastadion, Berlin	74,322
2018–19	Bayern Munich	3–0	RB Leipzig	Olympiastadion, Berlin	74,322
2019–20	Bayern Munich	4–2	Bayer Leverkusen	Olympiastadion, Berlin	0 (Note: The 2020 and 2021 finals were played behind closed doors due to the COVID-19 pandemic in Germany.)
2020–21	Borussia Dortmund	4–1	RB Leipzig	Olympiastadion, Berlin	0
2021–22	RB Leipzig	1–1 (a.e.t.) (4–2 p)	SC Freiburg	Olympiastadion, Berlin	74,322
2022–23	RB Leipzig	2–0	Eintracht Frankfurt	Olympiastadion, Berlin	74,322
2023–24	Bayer Leverkusen	1–0	1. FC Kaiserslautern (II)	Olympiastadion, Berlin	75,000
2024–25	VfB Stuttgart	4–2	Arminia Bielefeld (III)	Olympiastadion, Berlin	74,036
2025–26	Bayern Munich	3–0	VfB Stuttgart	Olympiastadion, Berlin	74,036

== Performance by club ==
Club	Winners	Runners-up	Years won	Years runner-up
Bayern Munich	21	4	1957, 1966, 1967, 1969, 1971, 1982, 1984, 1986, 1998, 2000, 2003, 2005, 2006, 2008, 2010, 2013, 2014, 2016, 2019, 2020, 2026	1985, 1999, 2012, 2018
Werder Bremen	6	4	1961, 1991, 1994, 1999, 2004, 2009	1989, 1990, 2000, 2010
Schalke 04	5	7	1937, 1972, 2001, 2002, 2011	1935, 1936, 1941, 1942, 1955, 1969, 2005
Borussia Dortmund	5	5	1965, 1989, 2012, 2017, 2021	1963, 2008, 2014, 2015, 2016
Eintracht Frankfurt	5	4	1974, 1975, 1981, 1988, 2018	1964, 2006, 2017, 2023
1. FC Köln	4	6	1968, 1977, 1978, 1983	1954, 1970, 1971, 1973, 1980, 1991
VfB Stuttgart	4	4	1954, 1958, 1997, 2025	1986, 2007, 2013, 2026
1. FC Nürnberg	4	2	1935, 1939, 1962, 2007	1940, 1982
Hamburger SV	3	3	1963, 1976, 1987	1956, 1967, 1974
Borussia Mönchengladbach (Note: In 1960 as Borussia München Gladbach.)	3	2	1960, 1973, 1995	1984, 1992
1. FC Kaiserslautern	2	6	1990, 1996	1961, 1972, 1976, 1981, 2003, 2024
Fortuna Düsseldorf	2	5	1979, 1980	1937, 1957, 1958, 1962, 1978
Bayer Leverkusen	2	3	1993, 2024	2002, 2009, 2020
Karlsruher SC	2	2	1955, 1956	1960, 1996
RB Leipzig	2	2	2022, 2023	2019, 2021
Dresdner SC (Note: Original club went defunct, with the new club being recognised as the successor.)	2	–	1940, 1941	–
1860 Munich	2	–	1942, 1964	–
Rot-Weiss Essen	1	1	1953	1994
VfL Wolfsburg	1	1	2015	1995
Schwarz-Weiß Essen	1	–	1959	–
Hannover 96	1	–	1992	–
VfB Leipzig (Note: Original club went defunct, with the new club, now known as Lokomotive Leipzig, being recognised as the successor.)	1	–	1936	–
Kickers Offenbach	1	–	1970	–
Bayer Uerdingen (Note: Now known as KFC Uerdingen.)	1	–	1985	–
First Vienna	1	–	1943	–
Rapid Wien	1	–	1938	–
MSV Duisburg (Note: In 1966 as Meidericher SV.)	–	4	–	1966, 1975, 1998, 2011
Alemannia Aachen	–	3	–	1953, 1965, 2004
Hertha BSC	–	2	–	1977, 1979
VfL Bochum	–	2	–	1968, 1988
SC Freiburg	–	1	–	2022
Hertha BSC Amateure (Note: Now known as Hertha BSC II.)	–	1	–	1993
Union Berlin	–	1	–	2001
Energie Cottbus	–	1	–	1997
FSV Frankfurt	–	1	–	1938
LSV Hamburg (Note: Club is now defunct.)	–	1	–	1943
Fortuna Köln	–	1	–	1983
Waldhof Mannheim	–	1	–	1939
Borussia Neunkirchen	–	1	–	1959
Stuttgarter Kickers	–	1	–	1987
Arminia Bielefeld	–	1	–	2025

== Ranking by venue ==
Rank	Venue	No. hosted
1	Olympiastadion, Berlin	45
2	Niedersachsenstadion, Hannover	8
3	Rheinstadion, Düsseldorf	5
3	Neckarstadion, Stuttgart	5
3	Waldstadion, Frankfurt	5
6	Müngersdorfer Stadion, Cologne	2
6	Südweststadion, Ludwigshafen	2
6	Parkstadion, Gelsenkirchen	2
6	Auestadion, Kassel	2
10	Rosenaustadion, Augsburg	1
10	Glückauf-Kampfbahn, Gelsenkirchen	1
10	Wildparkstadion, Karlsruhe	1
10	Eintracht-Stadion, Braunschweig	1

== Repeated final pairings ==
A total of 8 final pairings have been repeated on 11 occasions. Of these 8 final pairings, 6 have included Bayern Munich as a finalist. Two of these parings have been played more than twice. The most common final is Borussia Dortmund v Bayern Munich, having occurred on four occasions, with Werder Bremen v Bayern Munich the second-most common, having been repeated thrice. Werder Bremen v Bayern Munich is the only final pairing to have been played in consecutive seasons, occurring in 1999 and 2000. The longest gap between repeated finals is Bayern Munich v Schalke 04, occurring 36 years apart in 1969 and 2005.

Rank	Pairing	Occasions	Years	No. won by teams
1	Borussia Dortmund v Bayern Munich	4	2008, 2012, 2014, 2016	Bayern: 3 wins (2008, 2014, 2016); Dortmund: 1 win (2012)
2	Werder Bremen v Bayern Munich	3	1999, 2000, 2010	Bayern: 2 wins (2000, 2010); Bremen: 1 win (1999)
2	Bayern Munich v VfB Stuttgart	3	1986, 2013, 2026	All won by Bayern
3	Werder Bremen v 1. FC Kaiserslautern	2	1961, 1990	Bremen: 1 win (1961); Kaiserslautern: 1 win (1990)
3	MSV Duisburg v Bayern Munich	2	1966, 1998	Both won by Bayern
3	Fortuna Düsseldorf v 1. FC Köln	2	1978, 1980	Köln: 1 win (1978); Düsseldorf: 1 win (1980)
3	Eintracht Frankfurt v Bayern Munich	2	2006, 2018	Bayern: 1 win (2006); Frankfurt: 1 win (2018)
3	Bayern Munich v Schalke 04	2	1969, 2005	Both won by Bayern
