= 2020 DFB-Pokal final =

- Match programme cover
- Event: 2019–20 DFB-Pokal
Bayer Leverkusen	Bayern Munich
2	4
- Date: 4 July 2020
- Venue: Olympiastadion, Berlin
- Man of the Match: Robert Lewandowski (Bayern Munich)
- Referee: Tobias Welz (Wiesbaden)
- Attendance: 0 (Note: The final was played behind closed doors due to the COVID-19 pandemic in Germany.)
- Weather: Fair; 22 °C (72 °F); 60% humidity

The 2020 DFB-Pokal final decided the winner of the 2019–20 DFB-Pokal, the 77th season of the annual German football cup competition. The match was played on 4 July 2020 at the Olympiastadion in Berlin. Though originally scheduled for 23 May 2020, the German Football Association postponed the final on 24 April due to the COVID-19 pandemic in Germany. On 11 May 2020, the DFB Executive Committee approved a resumption of the competition, with the final scheduled for 4 July, subject to political approval, using a hygiene concept similar to that implemented by the DFL in the Bundesliga and 2. Bundesliga. As with other competitions, the match was played behind closed doors without any spectators. Due to the postponement, the match was the first DFB-Pokal final to take place after June since 1974.

The match featured Bundesliga clubs Bayer Leverkusen, in their first final since 2009, and Bayern Munich, the title holders and record-winners of the competition in their third consecutive final. Bayern Munich won the final 4–2 to win a second consecutive and record 20th overall DFB-Pokal title.

With the win, Bayern completed their 13th domestic double (later completing a second continental treble), and played at home against 2019–20 Bundesliga runners-up Borussia Dortmund in the 2020 DFL-Supercup. Because Bayern had already qualified for the Champions League through the Bundesliga, the sixth-place team in the Bundesliga, 1899 Hoffenheim, earned qualification for the group stage of the 2020–21 edition of the UEFA Europa League, and the league's second qualifying round spot went to the team in seventh, VfL Wolfsburg.

== Teams ==
In the following table, finals until 1943 were in the Tschammerpokal era, since 1953 were in the DFB-Pokal era.

Team	Previous final appearances (bold indicates winners)
Bayer Leverkusen	3 (**1993**, 2002, 2009)
Bayern Munich	23 (**1957**, **1966**, **1967**, **1969**, **1971**, **1982**, **1984**, 1985, **1986**, **1998**, 1999, **2000**, **2003**, **2005**, **2006**, **2008**, **2010**, 2012, **2013**, **2014**, **2016**, 2018, **2019**)

== Route to the final ==
The DFB-Pokal began with 64 teams in a single-elimination knockout cup competition. There were a total of five rounds leading up to the final. Teams were drawn against each other, and the winner after 90 minutes advanced. If still tied, 30 minutes of extra time were played. If the score was still level, a penalty shoot-out was used to determine the winner.

Note: In all results below, the score of the finalist is given first (H: home; A: away).

Bayer Leverkusen		Round	Bayern Munich	
Opponent	Result	2019–20 DFB-Pokal	Opponent	Result
Alemannia Aachen (A)	4–1	First round	Energie Cottbus (A)	3–1
SC Paderborn (H)	1–0	Second round	VfL Bochum (A)	2–1
VfB Stuttgart (H)	2–1	Round of 16	1899 Hoffenheim (H)	4–3
Union Berlin (H)	3–1	Quarter-finals	Schalke 04 (A)	1–0
1. FC Saarbrücken (A)	3–0	Semi-finals	Eintracht Frankfurt (H)	2–1

== Match ==
=== Details ===
4 July 2020
20:00 CEST

Bayer Leverkusen	2–4	Bayern Munich
S. Bender 64'; Havertz 90+5' (pen.)	Report	Alaba 16'; Gnabry 24'; Lewandowski 59', 89'

Olympiastadion, Berlin
Attendance: 0
Referee: Tobias Welz (Wiesbaden)

**Bayer Leverkusen**	**Bayern Munich**

GK	1	(Finland) Lukas Hradecky
RB	8	(Germany) Lars Bender (c)		(substituted off) 82'
CB	5	(Germany) Sven Bender
CB	12	(Burkina Faso) Edmond Tapsoba
LB	18	(Brazil) Wendell	(yellow card) 28'
CM	20	(Chile) Charles Aránguiz
CM	15	(Austria) Julian Baumgartlinger		(substituted off) 46'
RW	19	(France) Moussa Diaby
AM	11	(Germany) Nadiem Amiri		(substituted off) 46'
LW	9	(Jamaica) Leon Bailey		(substituted off) 76'
CF	29	(Germany) Kai Havertz
Substitutes:
GK	28	(Austria) Ramazan Özcan
DF	4	(Germany) Jonathan Tah
DF	6	(Austria) Aleksandar Dragović
DF	23	(Germany) Mitchell Weiser		(substituted on) 82'
MF	10	(Germany) Kerem Demirbay		(substituted on) 46'
MF	27	(Germany) Florian Wirtz
MF	38	(Germany) Karim Bellarabi		(substituted on) 76'
FW	13	(Argentina) Lucas Alario
FW	31	(Germany) Kevin Volland		(substituted on) 46'
Manager:
(Netherlands) Peter Bosz

GK	1	(Germany) Manuel Neuer (c)
RB	5	(France) Benjamin Pavard
CB	17	(Germany) Jérôme Boateng		(substituted off) 69'
CB	27	(Austria) David Alaba
LB	19	(Canada) Alphonso Davies
CM	32	(Germany) Joshua Kimmich
CM	18	(Germany) Leon Goretzka
RW	22	(Germany) Serge Gnabry		(substituted off) 87'
AM	25	(Germany) Thomas Müller		(substituted off) 87'
LW	29	(France) Kingsley Coman		(substituted off) 64'
CF	9	(Poland) Robert Lewandowski	(yellow card) 67'
Substitutes:
GK	26	(Germany) Sven Ulreich
DF	2	(Spain) Álvaro Odriozola
DF	4	(Germany) Niklas Süle
DF	21	(France) Lucas Hernandez		(substituted on) 69'
MF	6	(Spain) Thiago		(substituted on) 87'
MF	10	(Brazil) Philippe Coutinho		(substituted on) 87'
MF	11	(France) Michaël Cuisance
FW	14	(Croatia) Ivan Perišić		(substituted on) 64'
FW	35	(Netherlands) Joshua Zirkzee
Manager:
(Germany) Hansi Flick

Man of the Match:
Robert Lewandowski (Bayern Munich)

Assistant referees:
Rafael Foltyn (Wiesbaden)
Martin Thomsen (Kleve)
Fourth official:
Patrick Ittrich (Hamburg)
Video assistant referee:
Felix Zwayer (Berlin)
Assistant video assistant referee:
Marco Achmüller (Bad Füssing)

**Match rules**

- 90 minutes.
- 30 minutes of extra time if necessary.
- Penalty shoot-out if scores still level.
- Nine named substitutes.
- Maximum of five substitutions. (Note: Each team was given only three opportunities to make substitutions, with a fourth opportunity in extra time, excluding substitutions made at half-time, before the start of extra time and at half-time in extra time.)

=== Statistics ===
Statistic	Bayer Leverkusen	Bayern Munich
Goals scored	2	4
Total shots	7	17
Shots on target	3	7
Saves	3	1
Ball possession	50%	50%
Corner kicks	3	5
Fouls committed	15	14
Offsides	7	1
Yellow cards	1	1
Red cards	0	0

== See also ==
- 2020 DFL-Supercup
- Football in Berlin
