= 2019 DFB-Pokal final =

- Match programme cover
- Event: 2018–19 DFB-Pokal
RB Leipzig	Bayern Munich
0	3
- Date: 25 May 2019
- Venue: Olympiastadion, Berlin
- Man of the Match: Robert Lewandowski (Bayern Munich)
- Referee: Tobias Stieler (Hamburg)
- Attendance: 74,322

The 2019 DFB-Pokal final decided the winner of the 2018–19 DFB-Pokal, the 76th season of the annual German football cup competition. The match was played on 25 May 2019 at the Olympiastadion in Berlin.

The match featured Bundesliga clubs RB Leipzig, playing in their first final, and Bayern Munich, the record winners of the competition.

Bayern Munich won the final 3–0 for their 19th DFB-Pokal title. With the win, Bayern completed their 12th domestic double, and therefore played away to 2018–19 Bundesliga runners-up Borussia Dortmund in the 2019 DFL-Supercup in August 2019. Because Bayern qualified for the Champions League through the Bundesliga, the sixth-place team in the Bundesliga, VfL Wolfsburg, earned qualification for the group stage of the 2019–20 edition of the UEFA Europa League, and the league's third second round spot went to the team in seventh, Eintracht Frankfurt.

== Teams ==
In the following table, finals until 1943 were in the Tschammerpokal era, since 1953 were in the DFB-Pokal era.

Team	Previous final appearances (bold indicates winners)
RB Leipzig	None
Bayern Munich	22 (**1957**, **1966**, **1967**, **1969**, **1971**, **1982**, **1984**, 1985, **1986**, **1998**, 1999, **2000**, **2003**, **2005**, **2006**, **2008**, **2010**, 2012, **2013**, **2014**, **2016**, 2018)

== Background ==
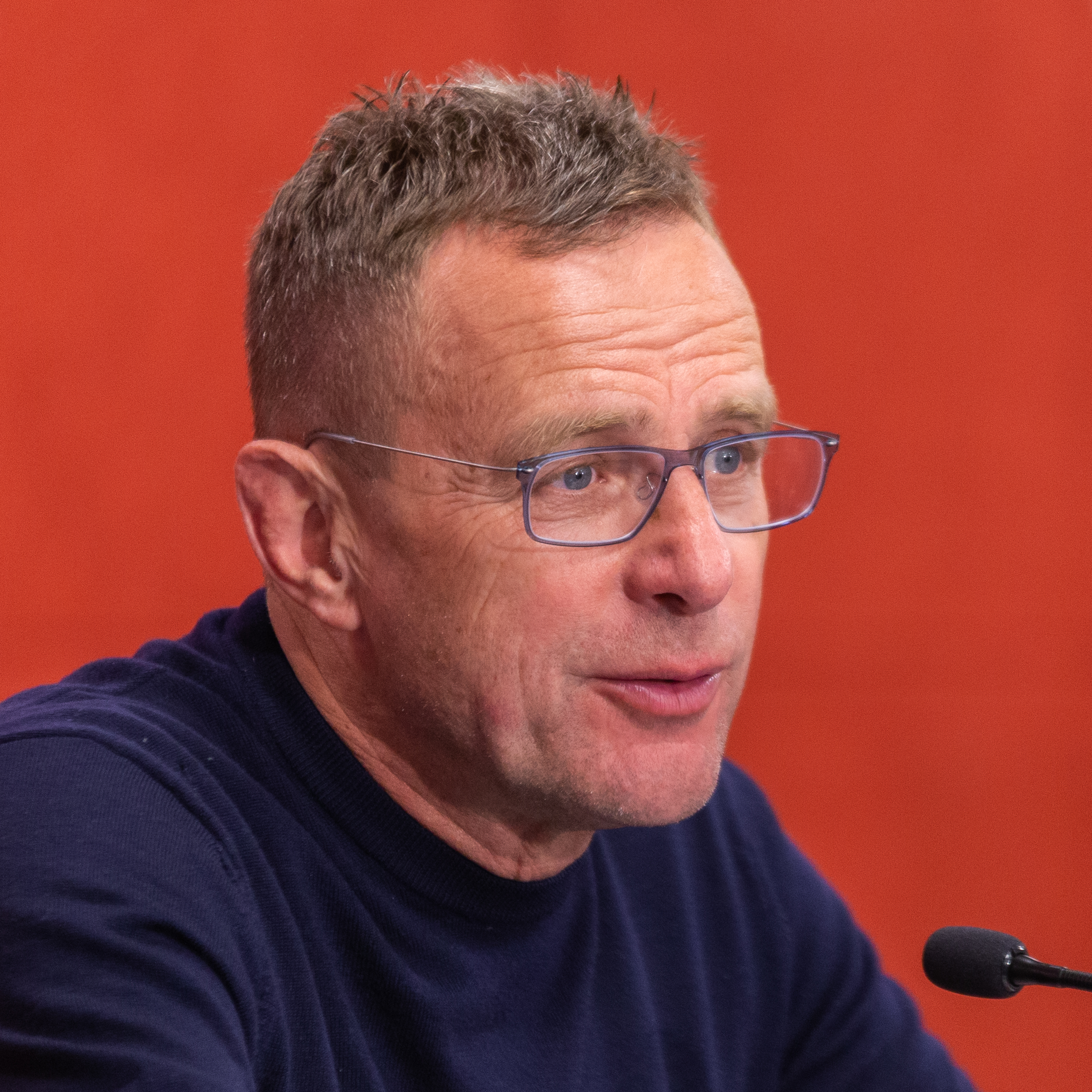
The match was the third DFB-Pokal final for RB Leipzig manager Ralf Rangnick

The match was the first final for RB Leipzig, competing in their seventh season of the tournament. Their previous best performance in the competition was reaching the second round on three occasions (in 2011–12, 2015–16 and 2017–18). Leipzig became the 39th unique club to reach the final, and the first final debutant since Union Berlin in 2001, an achievement reached just short of ten years since the club's founding on 19 May 2009. They were also the first club from Saxony to reach the final since Dresdner SC's win in 1941, as well as the second club from Leipzig to reach the final, after VfB Leipzig won in 1936. A victory would have seen RB Leipzig win their first major honour, with the club only previously winning regional league and cup titles. They would also have become the first team since Bayer Leverkusen in 1993 to win in their debut final.

The final was the last match for Ralf Rangnick as head coach of Leipzig, as he returned to his post as sporting director following the arrival of Julian Nagelsmann as coach for the 2019–20 season. Following the resignation of Ralph Hasenhüttl, Rangnick took over as head coach for the 2018–19 season, his second stint after leading the club to Bundesliga promotion in the 2015–16 season. While not serving as head coach, he was the sporting director of the club since the 2012–13 season. The match was the third DFB-Pokal final for Rangnick, having reached the final twice with Schalke 04 during his two stints at the club: he lost 1–2 to Bayern Munich in 2005, before winning the competition in 2011 with a 5–0 victory against MSV Duisburg.

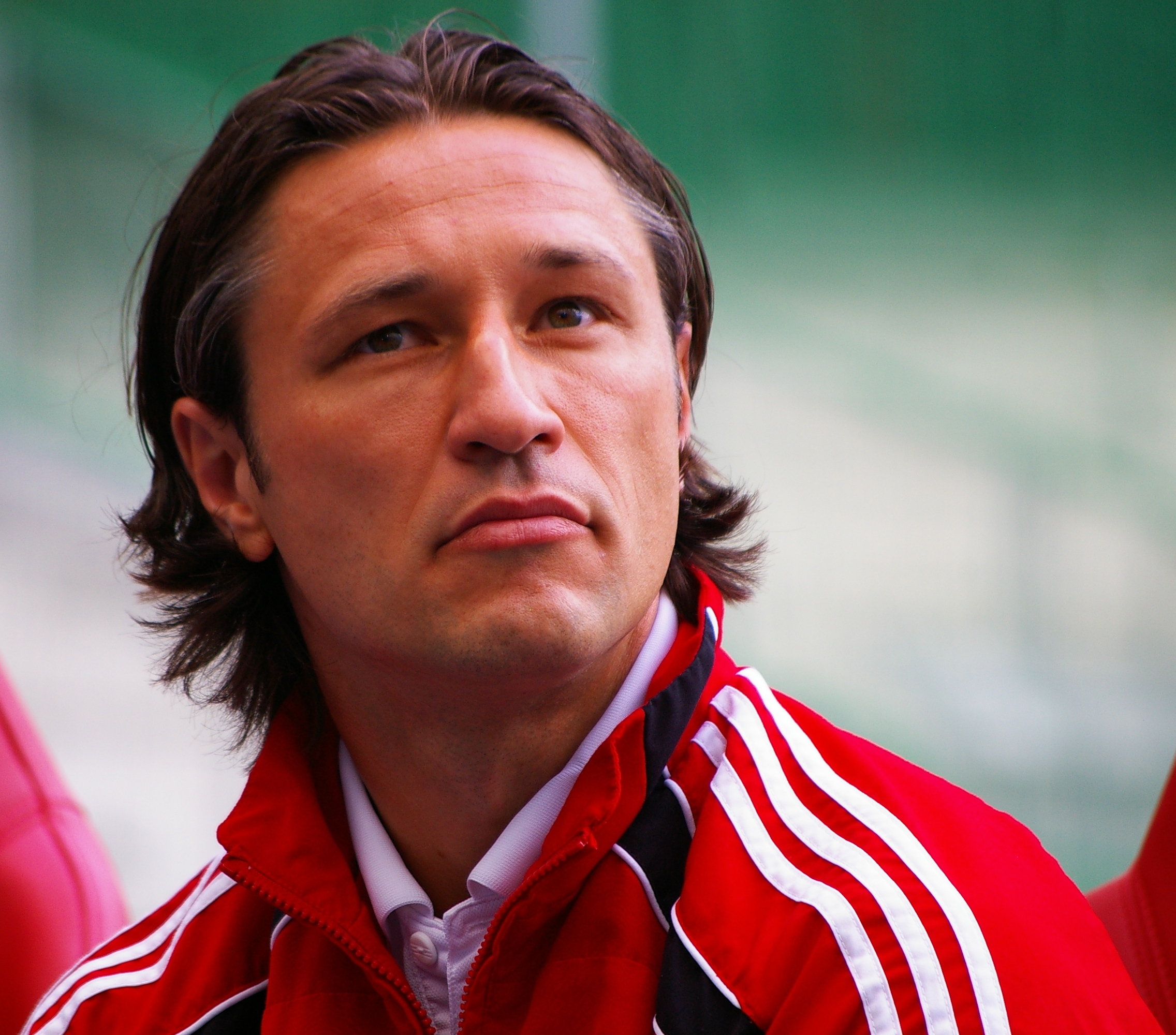
Bayern manager Niko Kovač reached a third consecutive final

The match was the 23rd final for Bayern Munich, extending their competition record. Of the previous finals, Bayern had won on 18 occasions, also a competition record, and lost four times. This was the second consecutive final for Bayern, having lost in the 2018 final to Eintracht Frankfurt, who were led by now-Bayern coach Niko Kovač. Bayern's last final victory was in 2016, where they won on penalties against Borussia Dortmund. Bayern were chasing a league and cup double, having won the 2018–19 Bundesliga on the final matchday, a week prior to the final. Bayern had previously completed the double on 11 occasions (in 2013 as part of a treble), a record in Germany, most recently in 2016.

The final was the third consecutive for Bayern manager Niko Kovač, the fourth coach to do so after Hans Schmidt (with Schalke 04, losing in 1935 and 1936, winning in 1937), Udo Lattek (with Bayern Munich, winning in 1984 and 1986, losing in 1985) and Otto Rehhagel (with Werder Bremen, losing in 1989 and 1990, winning in 1991). However, Kovač was the first to accomplish this with multiple clubs in the streak. Kovač, who was in his first season with Bayern, reached the previous two finals with Eintracht Frankfurt. In 2017, he lost 1–2 to Borussia Dortmund, before winning against future employers Bayern Munich in 2018. Kovač was the second manager to reach three DFB-Pokal finals in their first three attempts, following Hans Schmidt for Schalke 04 (between 1935 and 1937). He was also aiming to become the seventh coach to win consecutive DFB-Pokal titles, following Georg Köhler (Dresdner SC, 1940 and 1941), Zlatko Čajkovski (Bayern Munich, 1966 and 1967), Dietrich Weise (Eintracht Frankfurt, 1974 and 1975), Hennes Weisweiler (1. FC Köln, 1977 and 1978), Huub Stevens (Schalke 04, 2001 and 2002) and Felix Magath (Bayern Munich, 2005 and 2006). However, Kovač would be the first to accomplish this feat with a different club in each season. While in 2018 Kovač became the fifth person to win the DFB-Pokal as player and manager, winning this final would see him become the second person to accomplish this for the same club, having won the 2003 final with Bayern during his playing career. This was previously accomplished by Thomas Schaaf for Werder Bremen (player in 1991 and 1994, manager in 1999, 2004 and 2009). He would also become the second person to win multiple DFB-Pokal titles as manager after having previously won the competition as a player, also along with Schaaf.

The final was the eighth match between Leipzig and Bayern, with a record of four Bayern wins, one Leipzig win, and one draw (which Bayern won on penalties) prior. The match was the 65th unique final pairing in DFB-Pokal history. Of the prior matches, one had been in the DFB-Pokal, with the teams meeting in the second round of the previous season. The match in Leipzig finished as a 1–1 draw after extra time, with Bayern winning 5–4 in a penalty shoot-out. The remaining meetings occurred in the Bundesliga, with Bayern winning 3–0 at home and 5–4 away in the 2016–17 season. In the 2017–18 Bundesliga, Bayern won the first match 2–0 at home, before Leipzig won 2–1 at home in the second meeting. The sides met twice during the 2018–19 season prior to the final, with Bayern winning 1–0 at home in the first meeting on 19 December 2018, and the second meeting in Leipzig as a "final preview" on 11 May 2019 finishing as a 0–0 draw.

== Route to the final ==
The DFB-Pokal began with 64 teams in a single-elimination knockout cup competition. There were a total of five rounds leading up to the final. Teams were drawn against each other, and the winner after 90 minutes advanced. If still tied, 30 minutes of extra time were played. If the score was still level, a penalty shoot-out was used to determine the winner.

Note: In all results below, the score of the finalist is given first (H: home; A: away).

RB Leipzig		Round	Bayern Munich	
Opponent	Result	2018–19 DFB-Pokal	Opponent	Result
Viktoria Köln (A)	3–1	First round	SV Drochtersen/Assel (A)	1–0
1899 Hoffenheim (H)	2–0	Second round	SV Rödinghausen (A)	2–1
VfL Wolfsburg (H)	1–0	Round of 16	Hertha BSC (A)	3–2 (a.e.t.)
FC Augsburg (A)	2–1 (a.e.t.)	Quarter-finals	1. FC Heidenheim (H)	5–4
Hamburger SV (A)	3–1	Semi-finals	Werder Bremen (A)	3–2

== Match ==
=== Details ===
25 May 2019
20:00 CEST

RB Leipzig	0–3	Bayern Munich
	Report	Lewandowski 29', 85'; Coman 78'

Olympiastadion, Berlin
Attendance: 74,322
Referee: Tobias Stieler (Hamburg)

**RB Leipzig**	**Bayern Munich**

GK	1	(Hungary) Péter Gulácsi
RB	16	(Germany) Lukas Klostermann
CB	6	(France) Ibrahima Konaté		(substituted off) 82'
CB	4	(Hungary) Willi Orbán (c)		(substituted off) 70'
LB	23	(Germany) Marcel Halstenberg
DM	14	(United States) Tyler Adams		(substituted off) 65'
CM	7	(Austria) Marcel Sabitzer
CM	44	(Slovenia) Kevin Kampl
AM	10	(Sweden) Emil Forsberg
CF	9	(Denmark) Yussuf Poulsen
CF	11	(Germany) Timo Werner
Substitutes:
GK	28	(Switzerland) Yvon Mvogo
DF	5	(France) Dayot Upamecano	(yellow card) 82'	(substituted on) 70'
DF	22	(France) Nordi Mukiele
DF	27	(Austria) Konrad Laimer		(substituted on) 65'
MF	8	(Mali) Amadou Haidara		(substituted on) 82'
MF	31	(Germany) Diego Demme
FW	20	(Brazil) Matheus Cunha
Manager:
(Germany) Ralf Rangnick

GK	1	(Germany) Manuel Neuer (c)
RB	32	(Germany) Joshua Kimmich
CB	4	(Germany) Niklas Süle
CB	5	(Germany) Mats Hummels
LB	27	(Austria) David Alaba
CM	8	(Spain) Javi Martínez		(substituted off) 65'
CM	6	(Spain) Thiago
RW	22	(Germany) Serge Gnabry		(substituted off) 73'
AM	25	(Germany) Thomas Müller
LW	29	(France) Kingsley Coman		(substituted off) 87'
CF	9	(Poland) Robert Lewandowski	(yellow card) 87'
Substitutes:
GK	26	(Germany) Sven Ulreich
DF	13	(Brazil) Rafinha
DF	17	(Germany) Jérôme Boateng
MF	7	(France) Franck Ribéry		(substituted on) 87'
MF	10	(Netherlands) Arjen Robben		(substituted on) 73'
MF	24	(France) Corentin Tolisso		(substituted on) 65'
MF	35	(Portugal) Renato Sanches
Manager:
(Croatia) Niko Kovač

Man of the Match:
Robert Lewandowski (Bayern Munich)

Assistant referees:
Christian Gittelmann (Gauersheim)
Matthias Jöllenbeck (Freiburg)
Fourth official:
Bibiana Steinhaus (Langenhagen)
Video assistant referee:
Tobias Welz (Wiesbaden)
Assistant video assistant referee:
Martin Thomsen (Kleve)

**Match rules**

- 90 minutes.
- 30 minutes of extra time if necessary.
- Penalty shoot-out if scores still level.
- Seven named substitutes.
- Maximum of three substitutions, with a fourth allowed in extra time.

== See also ==
- 2019 DFL-Supercup
- Football in Berlin
