= 1980 DFB-Pokal final =

- Match programme cover
- Event: 1979–80 DFB-Pokal
Fortuna Düsseldorf	1. FC Köln
2	1
- Date: 4 June 1980
- Venue: Parkstadion, Gelsenkirchen
- Referee: Heinz Aldinger (Waiblingen)
- Attendance: 65,000

The 1980 DFB-Pokal final decided the winner of the 1979–80 DFB-Pokal, the 37th season of Germany's knockout football cup competition. It was played on 4 June 1980 at the Parkstadion in Gelsenkirchen. Fortuna Düsseldorf won the match 2–1 against 1. FC Köln, to claim their 2nd cup title.

== Route to the final ==
The DFB-Pokal began with 128 teams in a single-elimination knockout cup competition. There were a total of six rounds leading up to the final. Teams were drawn against each other, and the winner after 90 minutes would advance. If still tied, 30 minutes of extra time was played. If the score was still level, a replay would take place at the original away team's stadium. If still level after 90 minutes, 30 minutes of extra time was played. If the score was still level, a penalty shoot-out was used to determine the winner.

Note: In all results below, the score of the finalist is given first (H: home; A: away).

Fortuna Düsseldorf		Round	1. FC Köln
Opponent	Result	1979–80 DFB-Pokal	Opponent	Result
Borussia Neunkirchen (A)	4–0	Round 1	Mainz 05 (H)	5–1
Wacker 04 Berlin (H)	2–0	Round 2	Altonaer FC von 1893 (H)	10–0
SV Göppingen (A)	4–1	Round 3	VfL Bochum (A) (H)	3–3 (a.e.t.); 2–1 (replay)
Karlsruher SC (A)	5–3	Round of 16	Darmstadt 98 (H)	3–1
Kickers Offenbach (A)	5–2 (a.e.t.)	Quarter-finals	FC 08 Homburg (A)	4–1
Borussia Dortmund (H)	3–1	Semi-finals	Schalke 04 (A)	2–0

== Match ==
=== Details ===
4 June 1980
19:30 CEST

Fortuna Düsseldorf	2–1	1. FC Köln
Wenzel 60'; T. Allofs 65'	Report	Cullmann 26'

Parkstadion, Gelsenkirchen
Attendance: 65,000
Referee: Heinz Aldinger (Waiblingen)

Fortuna Düsseldorf	1. FC Köln

GK	1	(West Germany) Jörg Daniel
RB	4	(West Germany) Egon Köhnen
CB	3	(West Germany) Gerd Zewe (c)
CB	5	(West Germany) Heiner Baltes
LB	7	(West Germany) Heinz Wirtz
CM	2	(West Germany) Josef Weikl
CM	6	(West Germany) Rüdiger Wenzl	(substituted off) 89'
CM	9	(West Germany) Rudi Bommer
RW	8	(West Germany) Thomas Allofs
CF	10	(West Germany) Klaus Allofs
LW	11	(West Germany) Wolfgang Seel
Substitutes:
MF	13	(West Germany) Günther Bansemer	(substituted on) 89'
Manager:
(West Germany) Otto Rehhagel

GK	1	(West Germany) Harald Schumacher
RB	2	(West Germany) Harald Konopka
CB	8	(West Germany) Gerd Strack	Booked
CB	4	(West Germany) Herbert Zimmermann
LB	3	(West Germany) Dieter Prestin
CM	5	(West Germany) Bernd Schuster
CM	6	(West Germany) Bernhard Cullmann (c)
CM	11	(West Germany) Thomas Kroth		(substituted off) 66'
RW	7	(West Germany) Pierre Littbarski		(substituted off) 71'
CF	9	(West Germany) Dieter Müller
LW	10	(England) Tony Woodcock
Substitutes:
MF	12	(Japan) Yasuhiko Okudera		(substituted on) 66'
MF	13	(West Germany) Holger Willmer		(substituted on) 71'
Manager:
(West Germany) Karl-Heinz Heddergott

Match rules

- 90 minutes.
- 30 minutes of extra time if necessary.
- Penalty shoot-out if scores still level.
- Maximum of two substitutions.
