= 1978 DFB-Pokal final =

- Match programme cover
- Event: 1977–78 DFB-Pokal
Fortuna Düsseldorf	1. FC Köln
0	2
- Date: 15 April 1978
- Venue: Parkstadion, Gelsenkirchen
- Referee: Jan Redelfs (Hanover)
- Attendance: 70,000

The 1978 DFB-Pokal final decided the winner of the 1977–78 DFB-Pokal, the 35th season of Germany's knockout football cup competition. It was played on 15 April 1978 at the Parkstadion in Gelsenkirchen. 1. FC Köln won the match 2–0 against Fortuna Düsseldorf, to claim their 3rd cup title.

== Route to the final ==
The DFB-Pokal began with 128 teams in a single-elimination knockout cup competition. There were a total of six rounds leading up to the final. Teams were drawn against each other, and the winner after 90 minutes would advance. If still tied, 30 minutes of extra time was played. If the score was still level, a replay would take place at the original away team's stadium. If still level after 90 minutes, 30 minutes of extra time was played. If the score was still level, a penalty shoot-out was used to determine the winner.

Note: In all results below, the score of the finalist is given first (H: home; A: away).

Fortuna Düsseldorf		Round	1. FC Köln
Opponent	Result	1977–78 DFB-Pokal	Opponent	Result
FC St. Wendel (A)	6–1	Round 1	Kickers Offenbach (A)	4–0
Borussia Dortmund (H)	3–1	Round 2	Eintracht Bad Kreuznach (H)	3–1
Rot-Weiss Essen (H)	4–1	Round 3	FSV Frankfurt (A)	3–0
Eintracht Braunschweig (H)	3–1	Round of 16	Karlsruher SC (H)	4–0
Schalke 04 (A) (H)	1–1 (a.e.t.); 1–0 (replay)	Quarter-finals	Schwarz-Weiß Essen (H)	9–0
MSV Duisburg (H)	4–1	Semi-finals	Werder Bremen (H)	1–0

== Match ==
=== Details ===
15 April 1978
16:00 CET

Fortuna Düsseldorf	0–2	1. FC Köln
	Report	Cullmann 71'; Van Gool 90'

Parkstadion, Gelsenkirchen
Attendance: 70,000
Referee: Jan Redelfs (Hanover)

Fortuna Düsseldorf	1. FC Köln

GK	1	(West Germany) Jörg Daniel
RB	2	(West Germany) Dieter Brei
CB	3	(West Germany) Gerd Zewe (c)
CB	4	(West Germany) Gerd Zimmermann
LB	5	(West Germany) Heiner Baltes
CM	6	(West Germany) Egon Köhnen
CM	7	(West Germany) Josef Weikl
CM	10	(West Germany) Klaus Allofs
RW	8	(Denmark) Flemming Lund	(substituted off) 78'
CF	9	(Austria) Josef Hickersberger
LW	11	(West Germany) Wolfgang Seel
Substitutes:
MF	15	(West Germany) Rudi Bommer	(substituted on) 78'
Manager:
(West Germany) Dietrich Weise

GK	1	(West Germany) Harald Schumacher
RB	2	(West Germany) Harald Konopka
CB	5	(West Germany) Roland Gerber
CB	4	(West Germany) Gerd Strack
LB	3	(West Germany) Herbert Zimmermann
CM	6	(West Germany) Bernhard Cullmann
CM	8	(West Germany) Heinz Flohe (c)
CM	10	(West Germany) Herbert Neumann
RW	7	(Belgium) Roger Van Gool
CF	9	(West Germany) Dieter Müller
LW	11	(Japan) Yasuhiko Okudera
Manager:
(West Germany) Hennes Weisweiler

Match rules

- 90 minutes.
- 30 minutes of extra time if necessary.
- Penalty shoot-out if scores still level.
- Maximum of two substitutions.
