= 1960 DFB-Pokal final =

- Event: 1959–60 DFB-Pokal
Borussia München Gladbach	Karlsruher SC
3	2
- Date: 5 October 1960
- Venue: Rheinstadion, Düsseldorf
- Referee: Albert Dusch (Kaiserslautern)
- Attendance: 49,000

The 1960 DFB-Pokal final decided the winner of the 1959–60 DFB-Pokal, the 17th season of Germany's knockout football cup competition. It was played on 5 October 1960 at the Rheinstadion in Düsseldorf. Borussia München Gladbach won the match 3–2 against Karlsruher SC, to claim their first cup title.

== Route to the final ==
The DFB-Pokal began with five teams in a single-elimination knockout cup competition. There were a total of two rounds leading up to the final. In the qualification round, all but two teams were given a bye. Teams were drawn against each other, and the winner after 90 minutes would advance. If still tied, 30 minutes of extra time was played. If the score was still level, a replay would take place at the original away team's stadium. If still level after 90 minutes, 30 minutes of extra time was played. If the score was still level, a drawing of lots would decide who would advance to the next round.

Note: In all results below, the score of the finalist is given first (H: home; A: away; N: neutral).

Borussia München Gladbach		Round	Karlsruher SC
Opponent	Result	1959–60 DFB-Pokal	Opponent	Result
Hamburger SV (N)	2–0	Semi-finals	FK Pirmasens (H) (H)	3–4 (nullified); 2–0 (rescheduling)

== Match ==
=== Details ===
5 October 1960
20:00 CET

Borussia München Gladbach	3–2	Karlsruher SC
Mühlhausen 5'; Kohn 25'; Brülls 60'	Report	Herrmann 22'; Schwarz 58'

Rheinstadion, Düsseldorf
Attendance: 49,000
Referee: Albert Dusch (Kaiserslautern)

Borussia München Gladbach	Karlsruher SC

GK	1	(West Germany) Günter Jansen
RB		(West Germany) Lambert Pfeiffer
LB		(West Germany) Heinz de Lange
RH		(West Germany) Albert Jansen
CH		(West Germany) Hans Goebbels
LH		(West Germany) Friedhelm Frontzeck
OR		(West Germany) Franz Brungs
IR		(West Germany) Albert Brülls (c)
CF		(West Germany) Ulrich Kohn
IL		(West Germany) Karl-Heinz Mühlhausen
OL		(West Germany) Helmut Fendel
Manager:
(West Germany) Bernd Oles

GK	1	(West Germany) Horst Jungmann
RB		(West Germany) Wilhelm Dimmel
LB		(West Germany) Gustav Witlatschil
RH		(West Germany) Heinz Ruppenstein
CH		(West Germany) Willi Rihm
LH		(West Germany) Horst Szymaniak
OR		(West Germany) Willy Reitgaßl
IR		(West Germany) Günther Herrmann
CF		(West Germany) Walter Schwarz
IL		(West Germany) Friedel Späth
OL		(West Germany) Reinhold Nedoschil
Manager:
(Austria) Eduard Frühwirth

Match rules

- 90 minutes.
- 30 minutes of extra time if necessary.
- Replay if scores still level.
- No substitutions.
