= 1959–60 DFB-Pokal =

Tournament details
- Country: West Germany
- Teams: 5

Final positions
- Champions: Borussia Mönchengladbach
- Runner-up: Karlsruher SC

Tournament statistics
- Matches played: 3
- Goals scored: 9 (3 per match)
- Top goal scorer(s): Albert Brülls, Gustav Witlatschil (2)

The 1959–60 DFB-Pokal was the 17th season of the annual German football cup competition. It began on 7 September 1960 and ended on 5 October 1960. 4 teams competed in the tournament of two rounds. In the final Borussia Mönchengladbach defeated Karlsruher SC 3 – 2.

== Matches ==
=== Qualification round ===
6 August 1960

Hertha BSC	0 – 1	FK Pirmasens
	report (in German)	Matischak 89'

Poststadion, Berlin
Attendance: 8.000
Referee: Günther Ternieden (Oberhausen)

=== Semi-finals ===
7 September 1960

Hamburger SV	0 – 2	Borussia Mönchengladbach
	report (in German)	Brülls 2'; Brungs 54'

Preußenstadion
Attendance: 30.000
Referee: Günter Sparing (Kassel)
7 September 1960

Karlsruher SC	3 – 4^{*}	FK Pirmasens
Späth 37'; Szymaniak 73'; Nedoschil 85'	report (in German)	Seebach 41'; Matischak 72', 87'; Hohmann 79'

Waldstadion
Attendance: 1.500
Referee: Willi Thier (Gelsenkirchen)

^{*} The game was nullified and repeated because FK Pirmasens lined up a player (Rolf Fritzsche) who was not entitled to play.

==== Replay ====
21 September 1960

Karlsruher SC	2 – 0	FK Pirmasens
Witlatschil 34', 44'	report (in German)

Wildparkstadion, Karlsruhe
Attendance: 14.000
Referee: Günther Ternieden (Oberhausen)

=== Final ===
5 October 1960
20:00 CET

Borussia München Gladbach	3–2	Karlsruher SC
Mühlhausen 5'; Kohn 25'; Brülls 60'	Report	Herrmann 22'; Schwarz 58'

Rheinstadion, Düsseldorf
Attendance: 49,000
Referee: Albert Dusch (Kaiserslautern)
