= 1957 DFB-Pokal final =

- Match programme cover
- Event: 1956–57 DFB-Pokal
Fortuna Düsseldorf	Bayern Munich
0	1
- Date: 29 December 1957
- Venue: Rosenaustadion, Augsburg
- Referee: Albert Dusch (Kaiserslautern)
- Attendance: 44,000

The 1957 DFB-Pokal final decided the winner of the 1956–57 DFB-Pokal, the 14th season of Germany's knockout football cup competition. It was played on 29 December 1957 at the Rosenaustadion in Augsburg. Bayern Munich won the match 1–0 against Fortuna Düsseldorf, to claim their 1st cup title.

== Route to the final ==
The DFB-Pokal began with 5 teams in a single-elimination knockout cup competition. There were a total of two rounds leading up to the final. In the qualification round, all but two teams were given a bye. Teams were drawn against each other, and the winner after 90 minutes would advance. If still tied, 30 minutes of extra time was played. If the score was still level, a replay would take place at the original away team's stadium. If still level after 90 minutes, 30 minutes of extra time was played. If the score was still level, a drawing of lots would decide who would advance to the next round.

Note: In all results below, the score of the finalist is given first (H: home; A: away).

Fortuna Düsseldorf		Round	Bayern Munich
Opponent	Result	1956–57 DFB-Pokal	Opponent	Result
Bye		Qualification round	Spandauer SV (A)	4–1
Hamburger SV (H)	1–0	Semi-finals	1. FC Saarbrücken (H)	3–1 (a.e.t.)

== Match ==
=== Details ===
29 December 1957
14:00 CET

Fortuna Düsseldorf	0–1	Bayern Munich
	Report	Jobst 78'

Rosenaustadion, Augsburg
Attendance: 44,000
Referee: Albert Dusch (Kaiserslautern)

Fortuna Düsseldorf	Bayern Munich

GK	1	(West Germany) Albert Görtz
RB		(West Germany) Matthias Mauritz
LB		(West Germany) Erich Juskowiak
RH		(West Germany) Herbert Bayer
CH		(West Germany) Günter Jäger
LH		(West Germany) Martin Gramminger
OR		(West Germany) Bernhard Steffen
IR		(West Germany) Franz-Josef Wolfframm
CF		(West Germany) Karl Gramminger
IL		(West Germany) Heinz Jansen
OL		(West Germany) Hans Neuschäfer
Manager:
(West Germany) Hermann Lindemann

GK	1	(Hungary) Árpád Fazekas
RB		(West Germany) Willi Knauer
LB		(West Germany) Hans Bauer (c)
RH		(West Germany) Thomas Mayer
CH		(West Germany) Wiggerl Landerer
LH		(West Germany) Siegfried Manthey
OR		(West Germany) Gerhard Siedl
IR		(West Germany) Kurt Sommerlatt
CF		(West Germany) Peter Velhorn
IL		(West Germany) Rudi Jobst
OL		(West Germany) Werner Huber
Manager:
(Austria) Willibald Hahn

Match rules

- 90 minutes.
- 30 minutes of extra time if necessary.
- Replay if scores still level.
- No substitutions.
