= SV Alsenborn =

German football club

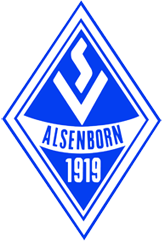
- Full name: Sportverein 1919 Alsenborn e.V.
- Founded: 1919
- Ground: Kinderlehre
- Capacity: 8,000
- Chairman: Dirk A. Leibfried
- League: A-Klasse Kaiserslautern-Donnersberg (IX)
- 2015–16: 14th
Home colours	Away colours

The SV Alsenborn is a German football club from the municipality of Enkenbach-Alsenborn, Rhineland-Palatinate.

The club became famous in Germany in the 1970s as a village club attempting to win promotion to the Bundesliga. For a time, it was coached by German football legend Fritz Walter, who wrote a book about the club, titled Aufstieg einer Dorfmanschaft (English: Rise of a village team).

The club was often seen as a football "miracle", considering how highly it achieved with a mostly amateur team from a small village.

== History ==
=== From 1919 to the 1960s ===
The club was formed on 15 September 1919, by 19 foundation members, under the name of FV Alsenborn.

In 1933, with the rise of the Nazis to power, the club conformed to the new powers; while another football club in town was formed whose membership exclusively consisted of social democrats.

The club, for most of its history, played in the lower amateur leagues of the Südwest (English: Southwest) region. In 1945, it renamed itself to SV Alsenborn but continued its existence as a village sport club.

=== Rise ===
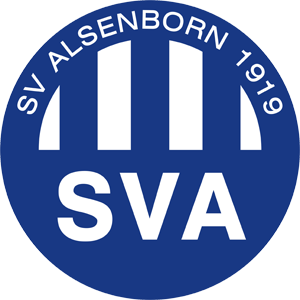
Historical variant of SV logo from the club's heyday.

The club's fortunes fundamentally changed in the 1960s when the retired captain of Germany's 1954 FIFA World Cup winning squad, Fritz Walter, moved to town. Walter became the coach of the side who was playing at this stage in the local A-Klasse, then the fifth tier of the German football league system in the region. He would remain coach for three years, a highly successful spell.

While watching the 1962 European Cup final in Amsterdam, Walter and Hannes Ruth, another former 1. FC Kaiserslautern player, vowed to build up the little club and take it to the top level of German football.

With a number of former Kaiserslautern players in its squad, SVA started to win promotions straight away, winning the A-Klasse in 1963, the Bezirksliga in 1964 and then, on first attempt, winning the Amateurliga Südwest (III) in the 1964–65 season.

With this title, the club earned promotion to the Regionalliga Südwest, then the second tier of German league football.

=== Regionalliga Südwest years ===
The club spent the first two seasons in the new league settling in, earning mid-table finishes.

In 1967–68, it won its first league championship, nine points clear of TuS Neuendorf. This qualified both clubs to take part in the promotion round to the Fußball-Bundesliga. In this, out of five teams in its group, SVA finished third on level points, when only the first place entitled to promotion.

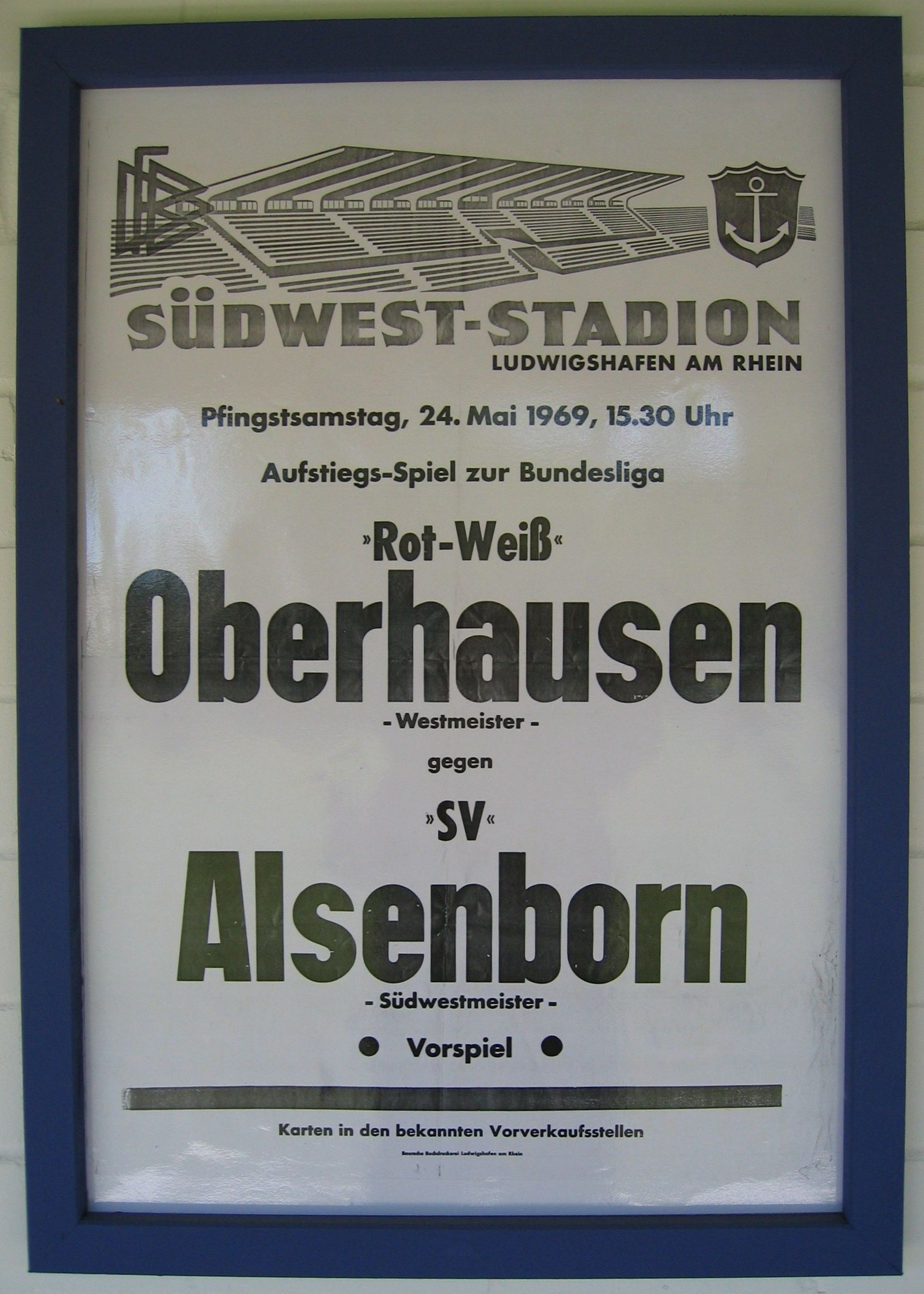
Poster for the SVA versus RWO Bundesliga promotion game in 1969

The next season saw a repeat of the league championship, sitting on equal points with Neuendorf but having scored considerably more goals. Again, the club went to the promotion round and despite its failure to gain a point from its two games against Rot-Weiß Oberhausen, the club stayed in contention for promotion to the very end by winning every other of its games. In the last round, against Hertha Zehlendorf, on 22 June 1969, it needed a win for promotion but lost 0–3 instead and Oberhausen went up, being one point ahead of SVA. At the end of the season, the club had to sell one of its best players, Lorenz Horr, who was then a record transfer for the German Bundesliga. The club also lost its championship-winning coach, Otto Render, in a car accident shortly after.

In 1969–70, the team won the league title for a third consecutive time, beating FK Pirmasens by three points. Taking part in the promotion round for a third time, too, the club also finished third in its group, not coming as close to promotion as it was in 1969. In the German Cup, the club managed to hold the then rising star of German football, Borussia Mönchengladbach, to a 1–1 draw after extra time, to lose the replay 1–3 a few days later, quite an achievement for the small club.

In its three years in the Bundesliga promotion round, the club played all its home games in the considerably larger stadium in Ludwigshafen.

The club continued to be a strong team in the Regionalliga after 1970, earning a fifth and third place in the following seasons, but not being able to repeat its performance from the time between 1967 and 1970. From 1972, the club slipped down the ranks, coming eighth and tenth in 1973 and 1974.

The year 1974 saw changes in the German league system. The five Regionalligas were disbanded in favor of two new 2nd Bundesligas, of which the 2nd Bundesliga Süd was the one SV Alsenborn aimed to qualify for.

SVA managed to qualify for the new league, the qualification system taking the last five seasons into account. However, the club held the last qualifying spot for the new league, five points ahead of 1. FC Saarbrücken. The SVA then found its license for the next season revoked on financial grounds as well as its home ground not being up to scratch, and 1. FCS was admitted instead. The club went through the various levels of appeal and at times the case was ruled in its favor but in the end the German Football Association ruled against the club. The situation brought back memories of 1963, when Saarbrücken was awarded a place in the Bundesliga for similar reasons. In 1963, like in 1974, the rumor was that the German Football Association chairman Hermann Neuberger, a native of the Saarland and honorary member of the 1. FC Saarbrücken, held its protecting hand over the club, to the disadvantage of the SV Alsenborn. But despite all outrage, the SVA had to step down to the third division and the 1. FCS stayed up, earning promotion back to the Bundesliga in 1976.

=== Decline ===
From this point in 1974, the club rapidly declined. SVA was not competitive in the third division Amateurliga Südwest and within two seasons suffered another relegation, to the Bezirksliga Westpfalz. In this league, the club managed to earn a second place in 1977–78, winning promotion to the new Verbandsliga Südwest (IV). Four seasons there saw a sixth place in 1979 as its best result but by 1982, it was back in the tier-five Bezirksliga Westpfalz. It earned a championship there in the 1982–83 and returned to the Verbandsliga straight away.

Three seasons with a third place in 1985 followed before having to return to the Bezirksliga. In 1988, another relegation took the club back to where it once, in the early 1960s, came from, the A-Klasse.

In 2011–12, the club played in the tier nine Kreisliga Kaiserslautern-Donnersberg-Süd, where it won promotion. After a season in the Bezirksklasse the club has played in the A-Klasse Kaiserslautern-Donnersberg since 2013.

With the promotion of the TSG 1899 Hoffenheim to the Fussball-Bundesliga in 2008, a village club finally archived what Alsenborn aimed for in the late 1960s.

== Honours ==
The club's honours:

- Regionalliga Südwest (II)
  - Champions: 1968, 1969, 1970
- Amateurliga Südwest (III)
  - Champions: 1965
- Bezirksliga Westpfalz (V)
  - Champions: 1983

== Recent seasons ==
The recent season-by-season performance of the club:

Season	Division	Tier	Position
2003–04	Kreisliga Kaiserslautern	VIII	10th
2004–05	Kreisliga Kaiserslautern	VIII	6th
2005–06	Kreisliga Kaiserslautern	VIII	6th
2006–07	Kreisliga Kaiserslautern	VIII	6th
2007–08	Kreisliga Kaiserslautern	VIII	7th
2008–09	Kreisliga Kaiserslautern	IX	7th
2009–10	Kreisliga Kaiserslautern	IX	3rd
2010–11	Kreisliga Kaiserslautern-Donnersberg-Süd	X	5th
2011–12	Kreisliga Kaiserslautern-Donnersberg-Süd	X	1st ↑
2012–13	Bezirksklasse Westpfalz Nord	IX	9th
2013–14	A-Klasse Kaiserslautern-Donnersberg	IX	7th
2014–15	A-Klasse Kaiserslautern-Donnersberg	IX	15th
2015–16	A-Klasse Kaiserslautern-Donnersberg	IX	14th
2016–17	A-Klasse Kaiserslautern-Donnersberg	IX	

- With the introduction of the Regionalligas in 1994 and the 3. Liga in 2008 as the new third tier, below the 2. Bundesliga, all leagues below dropped one tier.

↑ Promoted	↓ Relegated

== Stadium ==
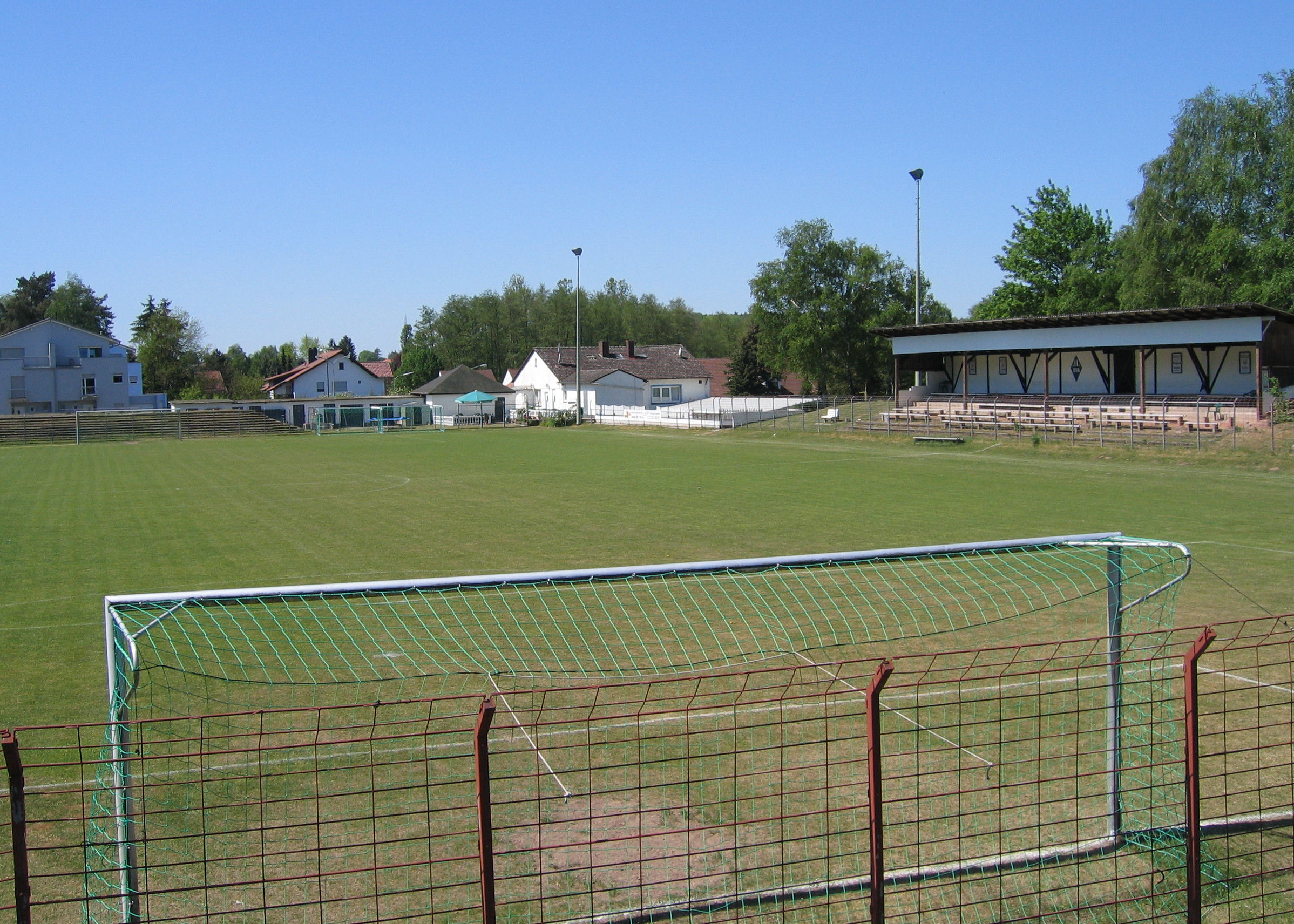
SV Alsenborn stadium

In its later Regionalliga days, the club's stadium was expanded to hold 16,000 spectators but nowadays it is reduced to a still very oversized 8,000. The stadium is decorated with posters of the 1960s Bundesliga promotion games. The old standing ranks are somewhat overgrown and the grand stand looks rather quaint.

== DFB Cup appearances ==
The club has qualified for the first round of the German Cup five times:

Season	Round	Date	Home	Away	Result	Attendance
1965–66 DFB-Pokal	First round	22 January 1966	Eintracht Frankfurt	SV Alsenborn	2–1	
1968–69 DFB-Pokal	First round	22 January 1969	SV Alsenborn	MSV Duisburg	2–1	
1968–69 DFB-Pokal	Second round	15 February 1969	FC Schalke 04	SV Alsenborn	3–1	
1969–70 DFB-Pokal	First round	8 April 1970	SV Alsenborn	FC Schalke 04	1–5	
1970–71 DFB-Pokal	First round	12 December 1970	SV Alsenborn	Borussia Mönchengladbach	1–1 aet	
1970–71 DFB-Pokal	First round replay	30 December 1970	Borussia Mönchengladbach	SV Alsenborn	3–1	
1971–72 DFB-Pokal	First round -first leg	4 December 1971	SV Alsenborn	Fortuna Düsseldorf	0–0	
1971–72 DFB-Pokal	First round – second leg	15 December 1971	Fortuna Düsseldorf	SV Alsenborn	3–0	
