= Hartmut Heidemann =

German footballer (1941–2022)

Personal information
- Date of birth: 5 June 1941
- Place of birth: Duisburg, Rhine Province, Prussia, Germany
- Date of death: 31 July 2022 (aged 81)
- Height: 1.76 m (5 ft 9 in)
- Position: Left-back

Senior career*
Years	Team	Apps	(Gls)
1959–1972	MSV Duisburg	347	(32)

International career
1966, 1968	West Germany	3	(0)

Managerial career
- 1973–1976: GSV Geldern 09/34
- * Club domestic league appearances and goals

Hartmut Heidemann (5 June 1941 – 31 July 2022) was a German footballer who played as a left-back. He spent nine seasons in the Bundesliga with MSV Duisburg. He also represented West Germany in three friendlies.

== Honours ==
MSV Duisburg

- Bundesliga runner-up: 1963–64
- DFB-Pokal runner-up: 1965–66
