= Bernhard Cullmann =

German footballer

Bernd Cullmann
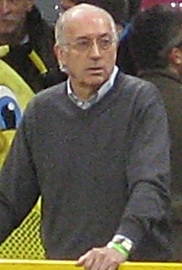
- Cullmann in 2011

Personal information
- Full name: Bernhard Cullmann
- Date of birth: 1 November 1949 (age 76)
- Place of birth: Rötsweiler, West Germany
- Height: 1.81 m (5 ft 11 1/2 in)
- Positions: Midfielder; defender

Youth career
- 1961–1969: SpVgg Porz

Senior career*
| Years | Team | Apps | (Gls) |
| 1970–1984 | 1. FC Köln | 341 | (29) |

International career
| 1972–1973 | West Germany U23 | 3 | (0) |
| 1972–1978 | West Germany B | 5 | (0) |
| 1973–1980 | West Germany | 40 | (6) |
Medal record
Men's football
Representing West Germany
FIFA World Cup
| Winner | 1974 West Germany |
UEFA European Championship
| Winner | 1980 Italy |
- * Club domestic league appearances and goals

Bernhard "Bernd" Cullmann (born 1 November 1949), is a German former footballer who played as a midfielder and sometimes as a defender.

He began his footballing career in 1969 with SpVgg Porz, until he was signed by 1. FC Köln in 1970. He played 341 matches in the Bundesliga for them before his retirement on health grounds in 1984. He played 40 matches for the Germany national team between 1973 and 1980, scoring six goals. He participated at the 1974 FIFA World Cup, the 1978 FIFA World Cup, and the victorious UEFA Euro 1980. Between 1991 and 1996 he was on the board of 1. FC Köln.

From 1996 until 2011, his son Carsten Cullmann has also played for 1. FC Köln's first and reserve teams.

== Honours ==
1. FC Köln

- Bundesliga: 1977–78
- DFB-Pokal: 1976–77, 1977–78, 1982–83

West Germany

- World Cup: 1974
- European Championship: 1980
