= Josef Weikl =

German association football player

Personal information
- Date of birth: 15 January 1954 (age 72)
- Place of birth: Bodenmais, Germany
- Height: 1.70 m (5 ft 7 in)
- Position: Midfielder

Youth career
- TSV Bodenmais

Senior career*
Years	Team	Apps	(Gls)
–1976	SC Zwiesel		
1976–1978	Fortuna Düsseldorf II		
1977–1988	Fortuna Düsseldorf	339	(26)
- 1. FC Wülfrath
- Düsseldorfer SC 99
- * Club domestic league appearances and goals

Josef Weikl (born 15 January 1954) is a retired German footballer, who played as a midfielder. He made 303 appearances in the Bundesliga, all of them for Fortuna Düsseldorf. He won the DFB-Pokal in 1979 and 1980 with the club.
