= Albert Görtz =

German footballer

Personal information
- Date of birth: 18 November 1933 (age 92)
- Place of birth: Düsseldorf, Germany
- Position: Goalkeeper

Senior career*
Years	Team	Apps	(Gls)
1957–1966	Fortuna Düsseldorf		
1966–1967	Düsseldorfer SC 99		

International career
- West Germany
- * Club domestic league appearances and goals

Albert Görtz (born 18 November 1933) is a German former footballer who played as a goalkeeper. He competed for West Germany in the men's tournament at the 1956 Summer Olympics.
