= Günter Jäger =

German footballer

Personal information
- Full name: Günter Jäger
- Date of birth: 21 December 1935 (age 90)
- Place of birth: Germany
- Position: Defender

Senior career*
Years	Team	Apps	(Gls)
1955–1963	Fortuna Düsseldorf		
1963–1966	Wuppertaler SV	48	(0)

International career
1958	West Germany	1	(0)
- * Club domestic league appearances and goals

Günter Jäger (born 21 December 1935) is a German former footballer who played as a defender for Fortuna Düsseldorf and Wuppertaler SV. He also played once for the Germany national team in 1958, and represented his country in the 1956 Summer Olympics.
