= 1969 DFB-Pokal final =

- Event: 1968–69 DFB-Pokal
Bayern Munich	Schalke 04
2	1
- Date: 14 June 1969
- Venue: Waldstadion, Frankfurt
- Referee: Helmut Fritz (Ludwigshafen)
- Attendance: 64,000

The 1969 DFB-Pokal final decided the winner of the 1968–69 DFB-Pokal, the 26th season of Germany's knockout football cup competition. It was played on 14 June 1969 at the Waldstadion in Frankfurt. Bayern Munich won the match 2–1 against Schalke 04, to claim their 4th cup title.

== Route to the final ==
The DFB-Pokal began with 32 teams in a single-elimination knockout cup competition. There were a total of four rounds leading up to the final. Teams were drawn against each other, and the winner after 90 minutes would advance. If still tied, 30 minutes of extra time was played. If the score was still level, a replay would take place at the original away team's stadium. If still level after 90 minutes, 30 minutes of extra time was played. If the score was still level, a drawing of lots would decide who would advance to the next round.

Note: In all results below, the score of the finalist is given first (H: home; A: away).

Bayern Munich		Round	Schalke 04
Opponent	Result	1968–69 DFB-Pokal	Opponent	Result
Kickers Offenbach (H) (A)	0–0 (a.e.t.); 1–0 (replay)	Round 1	Rot-Weiß Oberhausen (A)	3–2 (a.e.t.)
Arminia Hannover (H)	1–0	Round of 16	SV Alsenborn (H)	3–1
Hamburger SV (A)	2–0	Quarter-finals	Alemannia Aachen (H)	2–0
1. FC Nürnberg (H)	2–0	Semi-finals	1. FC Kaiserslautern (A); (H)	1–1 (a.e.t.); 3–1 (replay)

== Match ==
=== Details ===
14 June 1969
16:00 CET

Bayern Munich	2–1	Schalke 04
Müller 12', 35'	Report	Pohlschmidt 20'

Waldstadion, Frankfurt
Attendance: 64,000
Referee: Helmut Fritz (Ludwigshafen)

Bayern Munich	Schalke 04

GK	1	(West Germany) Sepp Maier
SW	5	(West Germany) Franz Beckenbauer
CB	2	(West Germany) Werner Olk (c)
CB	4	(West Germany) Hans-Georg Schwarzenbeck
CB	3	(Austria) Peter Pumm
CM	8	(West Germany) Rainer Ohlhauser
CM	6	(West Germany) Helmut Schmidt
CM	10	(Austria) August Starek
RW	7	(West Germany) Franz Roth
CF	9	(West Germany) Gerd Müller
LW	11	(West Germany) Dieter Brenninger
Manager:
(Socialist Federal Republic of Yugoslavia) Branko Zebec

GK	1	(West Germany) Norbert Nigbur
SW	5	(West Germany) Klaus Fichtel (c)
CB	2	(West Germany) Hans-Jürgen Becher	(substituted off) 60'
CB	10	(West Germany) Klaus Senger
CB	3	(West Germany) Friedel Rausch
CM	8	(West Germany) Hermann Erlhoff
CM	4	(West Germany) Gerhard Neuser
CM	6	(Netherlands) Heinz van Haaren	(substituted off) 76'
RW	7	(West Germany) Reinhard Libuda
CF	11	(West Germany) Hans-Jürgen Wittkamp
LW	9	(West Germany) Manfred Pohlschmidt
Substitutes:
DF	12	(Poland) Waldemar Słomiany	(substituted in) 76'
DF	13	(West Germany) Jürgen-Michael Galberz	(substituted in) 60'
Manager:
(West Germany) Rudi Gutendorf

Match rules

- 90 minutes.
- 30 minutes of extra time if necessary.
- Replay if scores still level.
- Maximum of two substitutions.
