= 1990 DFB-Pokal final =

- Match programme cover
- Event: 1989–90 DFB-Pokal
1. FC Kaiserslautern	Werder Bremen
3	2
- Date: 19 May 1990
- Venue: Olympiastadion, West Berlin
- Referee: Manfred Neuner (Leimen)
- Attendance: 76,391

The 1990 DFB-Pokal final decided the winner of the 1989–90 DFB-Pokal, the 47th season of Germany's premier knockout football cup competition. It was played on 19 May 1990 at the Olympiastadion in West Berlin. 1. FC Kaiserslautern won the match 3–2 against Werder Bremen to claim their first cup title, qualifying for the 1990–91 European Cup Winners' Cup and the 1990 DFB-Supercup.

== Route to the final ==
The DFB-Pokal began with 64 teams in a single-elimination knockout cup competition. There were a total of five rounds leading up to the final. Teams were drawn against each other, and the winner after 90 minutes would advance. If still tied, 30 minutes of extra time was played. If the score was still level, a replay would take place at the original away team's stadium. If still level after 90 minutes, 30 minutes of extra time was played. If the score was still level, a drawing of lots would decide who would advance to the next round.

Note: In all results below, the score of the finalist is given first (H: home; A: away).

1. FC Kaiserslautern		Round	Werder Bremen
Opponent	Result	1989–90 DFB-Pokal	Opponent	Result
Bayer Leverkusen Amateure (A)	1–0	Round 1	FC St. Pauli (A)	2–1
Mainz 05 (A)	3–1	Round 2	Stuttgarter Kickers (A)	3–2
1. FC Köln (H)	2–1	Round of 16	1860 Munich (A)	2–1
Fortuna Düsseldorf (H)	3–1	Quarter-finals	VfB Stuttgart (H)	3–0
Kickers Offenbach (A)	1–0	Semi-finals	Eintracht Braunschweig (H)	2–0

== Match ==
=== Details ===
19 May 1990
18:00 CEST

1. FC Kaiserslautern	3–2	Werder Bremen
Labbadia 19', 26'; Kuntz 30'	Report	Neubarth 54'; Burgsmüller 72'

Olympiastadion, West Berlin
Attendance: 76,391
Referee: Manfred Neuner (Leimen)

1. FC Kaiserslautern	Werder Bremen

GK	1	(West Germany) Gerald Ehrmann
SW	7	(West Germany) Reinhard Stumpf
CB	5	(West Germany) Kay Friedmann		(substituted off) 57'
CB	3	(West Germany) Franco Foda	Booked
RWB	4	(West Germany) Uwe Scherr
LWB	6	(West Germany) Frank Lelle
CM	8	(West Germany) Markus Schupp		(substituted off) 77'
CM	10	(Socialist Federal Republic of Yugoslavia) Demir Hotić
CM	2	(United States) Thomas Dooley
CF	9	(West Germany) Bruno Labbadia	(yellow card) 57'
CF	11	(West Germany) Stefan Kuntz (c)
Substitutes:
DF	13	(West Germany) Roger Lutz		(substituted on) 57'
MF	12	(West Germany) Axel Roos		(substituted on) 77'
Manager:
(West Germany) Karl-Heinz Feldkamp

GK	1	(West Germany) Oliver Reck
SW	4	(Norway) Rune Bratseth
CB	6	(West Germany) Uli Borowka	(substituted off) 52'
CB	3	(West Germany) Jonny Otten
RWB	2	(West Germany) Thomas Wolter	(substituted off) 35'
LWB	5	(West Germany) Günter Hermann
CM	8	(West Germany) Miroslav Votava (c)
CM	10	(West Germany) Uwe Harttgen
CM	7	(West Germany) Dieter Eilts
CF	9	(West Germany) Karl-Heinz Riedle
CF	11	(New Zealand) Wynton Rufer
Substitutes:
FW	12	(West Germany) Frank Neubarth	(substituted on) 35'
FW	13	(West Germany) Manfred Burgsmüller	(substituted on) 52'
Manager:
(West Germany) Otto Rehhagel

Match rules

- 90 minutes.
- 30 minutes of extra time if necessary.
- Penalty shoot-out if scores still level.
- Maximum of two substitutions.

== See also ==
- Deutschland-Cup (football)
