= Heiner Baltes =

German footballer

Personal information
- Full name: Heiner Baltes
- Date of birth: 19 August 1949 (age 77)
- Place of birth: Erkrath-Unterbach, West Germany
- Position: Defender

Senior career*
| Years | Team | Apps | (Gls) |
| 1970–1981 | Fortuna Düsseldorf | 279 | (11) |
- * Club domestic league appearances and goals

Heiner Baltes (born 19 August 1949 in Erkrath-Unterbach, West Germany) is a German retired footballer who played as a defender. He spent his whole 11-year career with Fortuna Düsseldorf, playing 279 league games.
