= Günther Herrmann (footballer) =

German footballer (1939–2023)

Personal information
- Date of birth: 11 September 1939
- Place of birth: Trier, Germany
- Date of death: 22 July 2023 (aged 83)
- Place of death: Switzerland
- Positions: Midfielder; forward

Youth career
- Eintracht Trier

Senior career*
Years	Team	Apps	(Gls)
1956–1958	Eintracht Trier		
1958–1963	Karlsruher SC	115	(19)
1963–1967	Schalke 04	110	(22)
1967–1968	Karlsruher SC	24	(5)
1968–1975	FC Sion		

International career
1960–1967	West Germany	9	(0)
- * Club domestic league appearances and goals

Günther Herrmann (11 September 1939 – 22 July 2023) was a German footballer who was capped nine times for the West Germany national team.

Herrmann started his club career with Eintracht Trier (1956–1958) and Karlsruher SC (1958–1963). He moved to Schalke 04 for the 1963–64 season and made 110 league appearances for them over the next four seasons. He returned to Karlsruher SC for the 1967–68 season, and then moved to FC Sion (1968–1975).

Herrmann was a member of the German squad at the 1962 FIFA World Cup.

Herrmann died on 22 July 2023, at the age of 83.
