= 1936 Tschammerpokal final =

- Match programme cover
- Event: 1936 Tschammerpokal
VfB Leipzig	Schalke 04
2	1
- Date: 3 January 1937
- Venue: Olympiastadion, Berlin
- Referee: Egon Zacher (Berlin)
- Attendance: 70,000

The 1936 Tschammerpokal final decided the winner of the 1936 Tschammerpokal, the 2nd season of Germany's knockout football cup competition. It was played on 3 January 1937 at the Olympiastadion in Berlin. VfB Leipzig won the match 2–1 against Schalke 04 to claim their 1st cup title.

== Route to the final ==
The Tschammerpokal began the final stage with 64 teams in a single-elimination knockout cup competition. There were a total of five rounds leading up to the final. Teams were drawn against each other, and the winner after 90 minutes would advance. If still tied, 30 minutes of extra time was played. If the score was still level, a replay would take place at the original away team's stadium. If still level after 90 minutes, 30 minutes of extra time was played. If the score was still level, a second replay would take place at the original home team's stadium. If still level after 90 minutes, 30 minutes of extra time was played. If the score was still level, a drawing of lots would decide who would advance to the next round.

Note: In all results below, the score of the finalist is given first (H: home; A: away).

VfB Leipzig		Round	Schalke 04
Opponent	Result	1936 Tschammerpokal	Opponent	Result
1. SV Jena (H)	5–0	Round 1	VfvB Ruhrort (A)	5–2
Vorwärts-Rasensport Gleiwitz (A) (H)	2–2 (a.e.t.); 3–0 (replay)	Round 2	SpVgg Röhlinghausen (H)	2–0
Berliner SV 1892 (H)	2–0	Round of 16	VfB Stuttgart (A) (H)	0–0 (a.e.t.); 6–0 (replay)
VfB Peine (A)	4–2	Quarter-finals	Werder Bremen (A)	5–2 (a.e.t.)
Wormatia Worms (H)	5–1	Semi-finals	FC Schweinfurt 05 (H)	3–2

== Match ==
=== Details ===
3 January 1937

VfB Leipzig	2–1	Schalke 04
May 21'; Gabriel 32'	Report	Kalwitzki 42'

Olympiastadion, Berlin
Attendance: 70,000
Referee: Egon Zacher (Berlin)

VfB Leipzig	Schalke 04

GK	1	(Germany) Bruno Wöllner
RB		(Germany) Erich Dobermann
LB		(Germany) Rudolf Große
RH		(Germany) Gerhard Richter
CH		(Germany) Erich Thiele
LH		(Germany) Walter Jähnig
OR		(Germany) Hans Breidenbach
IR		(Germany) Martin Schön
CF		(Germany) Jacob May
IL		(Germany) Georg Reichmann
OL		(Germany) Herbert Gabriel
Manager:
(Germany) Heinrich Pfaff

GK	1	(Germany) Hermann Mellage
RB		(Germany) Hans Bornemann
LB		(Germany) Otto Schweisfurth
RH		(Germany) Rudolf Gellesch
CH		(Germany) Hermann Nattkämper
LH		(Germany) Otto Tibulski
OR		(Germany) Ernst Kalwitzki
IR		(Germany) Fritz Szepan
CF		(Germany) Ernst Poertgen
IL		(Germany) Ernst Kuzorra (c)
OL		(Germany) Ernst Sontow
Manager:
(Germany) Hans Schmidt

Match rules

- 90 minutes.
- 30 minutes of extra time if necessary.
- Replay if scores still level.
- No substitutions.
