= 1966 DFB-Pokal final =

- Match programme cover
- Event: 1965–66 DFB-Pokal
Meidericher SV	Bayern Munich
2	4
- Date: 4 June 1966
- Venue: Waldstadion, Frankfurt
- Referee: Gerhard Schulenburg (Hamburg)
- Attendance: 60,000

The 1966 DFB-Pokal final decided the winner of the 1965–66 DFB-Pokal, the 23rd season of Germany's knockout football cup competition. It was played on 4 June 1966 at the Waldstadion in Frankfurt. Bayern Munich won the match 4–2 against Meidericher SV, to claim their 2nd cup title.

== Route to the final ==
The DFB-Pokal began with 34 teams in a single-elimination knockout cup competition. There were a total of five rounds leading up to the final. In the qualification round, all but four teams were given a bye. Teams were drawn against each other, and the winner after 90 minutes would advance. If still tied, 30 minutes of extra time was played. If the score was still level, a replay would take place at the original away team's stadium. If still level after 90 minutes, 30 minutes of extra time was played. If the score was still level, a drawing of lots would decide who would advance to the next round.

Note: In all results below, the score of the finalist is given first (H: home; A: away).

Meidericher SV		Round	Bayern Munich
Opponent	Result	1965–66 DFB-Pokal	Opponent	Result
Bye		Qualification round	Borussia Dortmund (H)	2–0
VfB Stuttgart (H)	2–0	Round 1	Eintracht Braunschweig (H)	1–0
Schalke 04 (H)	6–0	Round of 16	1. FC Köln (H)	2–0
Karlsruher SC (H)	1–0	Quarter-finals	Hamburger SV (A)	2–1
1. FC Kaiserslautern (H)	4–3	Semi-finals	1. FC Nürnberg (A)	2–1 (a.e.t.)

== Match ==
=== Details ===
4 June 1966
16:00 CET

Meidericher SV	2–4	Bayern Munich
Mielke 28'; Heidemann 72' (pen.)	Report	Ohlhauser 31'; Brenninger 56', 77' (pen.); Beckenbauer 82'

Waldstadion, Frankfurt
Attendance: 60,000
Referee: Gerhard Schulenburg (Hamburg)

Meidericher SV	Bayern Munich

GK	1	(West Germany) Manfred Manglitz
RB		(West Germany) Hartmut Heidemann
LB		(West Germany) Johann Sabath
RH		(West Germany) Werner Lotz
CH		(West Germany) Manfred Müller
LH		(West Germany) Michael Bella
OR		(West Germany) Carl-Heinz Rühl
IR		(West Germany) Werner Krämer (c)
CF		(West Germany) Rüdiger Mielke
IL		(Netherlands) Heinz van Haaren
OL		(West Germany) Horst Gecks
Manager:
(West Germany) Hermann Eppenhoff

GK	1	(West Germany) Sepp Maier
RB		(West Germany) Hans Nowak
LB		(West Germany) Werner Olk (c)
RH		(West Germany) Hans Rigotti
CH		(West Germany) Franz Beckenbauer
LH		(West Germany) Peter Kupferschmidt
OR		(West Germany) Rudolf Nafziger
IR		(West Germany) Gerd Müller
CF		(West Germany) Rainer Ohlhauser
IL		(West Germany) Dieter Koulmann
OL		(West Germany) Dieter Brenninger
Manager:
(Socialist Federal Republic of Yugoslavia) Zlatko Čajkovski

Match rules

- 90 minutes.
- 30 minutes of extra time if necessary.
- Replay if scores still level.
- No substitutions.
