= 1968–69 DFB-Pokal =

Tournament details
- Country: West Germany
- Teams: 32

Final positions
- Champions: Bayern Munich
- Runners-up: Schalke 04

Tournament statistics
- Matches played: 35

The 1968–69 DFB-Pokal was the 26th season of the annual German football cup competition. It began on 4 January 1969 and ended on 14 June 1969. 32 teams competed in the tournament of five rounds. In the final Bayern Munich defeated Schalke 04 2–1, thereby winning their third title within four years and the fourth overall, making them the team with the most cup wins. It was also Bayern's first double.

== Matches ==
=== First round ===
4 January 1969
Borussia Mönchengladbach	5 – 2	Hertha BSC
22 January 1969
VfR Wormatia Worms	2 – 3	Preußen Münster
TSV Langenhorn Hamburg	1 – 2	SC Sperber Hamburg
Rot-Weiß Essen	1 – 2	SV Werder Bremen
SV Alsenborn	2 – 1	MSV Duisburg
Eintracht Trier	1 – 3	1. FC Nürnberg
Rot-Weiß Oberhausen	2 – 3	FC Schalke 04	(AET)
VfL Wolfsburg	1 – 2	Hamburger SV
Jahn Regensburg	0 – 1	Alemannia Aachen
Freiburger FC	0 – 1	1. FC Kaiserslautern
Arminia Hannover	4 – 0	FC Schweinfurt 05
VfB Stuttgart	1 – 0	1. FC Köln
Eintracht Braunschweig	1 – 0	TSV 1860 München
FC Bayern Munich	0 – 0	Kickers Offenbach	(AET)
Eintracht Frankfurt	6 – 2	Borussia Dortmund
Wacker 04 Berlin	1 – 4	Hannover 96

==== Replay ====
19 March 1969
Kickers Offenbach	0 – 1	FC Bayern Munich

=== Round of 16 ===
15 February 1969
Hamburger SV	2 – 0	Borussia Mönchengladbach	(AET)
Alemannia Aachen	2 – 0	Preußen Münster
FC Bayern Munich	1 – 0	Arminia Hannover
FC Schalke 04	3 – 1	SV Alsenborn
1. FC Kaiserslautern	1 – 0	Eintracht Frankfurt
SV Werder Bremen	5 – 0	Eintracht Braunschweig
Hannover 96	2 – 2	VfB Stuttgart	(AET)
2 April 1969
SC Sperber Hamburg	0 – 0	1. FC Nürnberg	(AET)

==== Replays ====
5 March 1969
VfB Stuttgart	0 – 1	Hannover 96
12 April 1969
1. FC Nürnberg	7 – 0	SC Sperber Hamburg

=== Quarter-finals ===
5 April 1969
Hamburger SV	0 – 2	FC Bayern Munich
FC Schalke 04	2 – 0	Alemannia Aachen
1. FC Kaiserslautern	3 – 0	SV Werder Bremen
23 April 1969
1. FC Nürnberg	1 – 0	Hannover 96

=== Semi-finals ===
3 May 1969
FC Bayern Munich	2 – 0	1. FC Nürnberg
1. FC Kaiserslautern	1 – 1	FC Schalke 04	(AET)

==== Replay ====
13 May 1969
FC Schalke 04	3 – 1	1. FC Kaiserslautern

=== Final ===
14 June 1969
16:00 CET

Bayern Munich	2–1	Schalke 04
Müller 12', 35'	Report	Pohlschmidt 20'

Waldstadion, Frankfurt
Attendance: 64,000
Referee: Helmut Fritz (Ludwigshafen)
