= 2013 DFB-Pokal final =

- Match programme cover
- Event: 2012–13 DFB-Pokal
Bayern Munich	VfB Stuttgart
3	2
- Date: 1 June 2013
- Venue: Olympiastadion, Berlin
- Referee: Manuel Gräfe (Berlin)
- Attendance: 74,420
- Weather: Partly cloudy 17 °C (63 °F); 86% humidity

The 2013 DFB-Pokal final was an association football match that took place on 1 June 2013 between Bayern Munich and VfB Stuttgart at the Olympiastadion in Berlin to decide the winners of the 2012–13 DFB-Pokal.

Bayern Munich won the game 3–2, claiming the cup for the 16th time. The win, combined with earlier titles in the Champions League and Bundesliga, allowed Bayern Munich to complete a continental treble. The feat had never been achieved by a German team before, and had only been achieved by six other European teams.

== Route to the final ==
The DFB-Pokal began with 64 teams in a single-elimination knockout cup competition. There were a total of five rounds leading up to the final. Teams were drawn against each other, and the winner after 90 minutes advanced. If still tied, 30 minutes of extra time were played. If the score was still level, a penalty shoot-out was used to determine the winner.

Note: In all results below, the score of the finalist is given first (H: home; A: away).

Bayern Munich		Round	VfB Stuttgart	
Opponent	Result	2012–13 DFB-Pokal	Opponent	Result
Jahn Regensburg (A)	4–0	First round	SV Falkensee-Finkenkrug (A)	5–0
1. FC Kaiserslautern (H)	4–0	Second round	FC St. Pauli (H)	3–0
FC Augsburg (A)	2–0	Round of 16	1. FC Köln (H)	2–1
Borussia Dortmund (H)	1–0	Quarter-finals	VfL Bochum (H)	2–0
VfL Wolfsburg (H)	6–1	Semi-finals	SC Freiburg (H)	2–1

== Match ==
=== Summary ===
For the final, Bayern Munich was without the services of Dante and Luiz Gustavo, who were playing for the Brazil national team. Additionally, Mario Gómez, normally a reserve, was given the start over Mario Mandžukić. Even so, VfB Stuttgart was considered a massive underdog before the match began.

Munich came out pressing, just missing a goal five minutes in. Stuttgart pressed back, narrowly missing on two scoring chances. Another scoring chance by Munich failed and the score remained 0–0 after 35 minutes. At the 37-minute mark, Thomas Müller got the scoring underway for Munich with a penalty, kicking the ball low to the right and sending the goalkeeper the wrong way. Just after half-time, Gómez made it 2–0 when he turned in a Philipp Lahm cross from the right. At the 61-minute mark, Gómez scored again making the match 3–0 with a low, right-footed shot after the ball was crossed low from the right by Thomas Müller and seemingly putting the game out of reach for Stuttgart, prompting Munich fans to start celebrating in the stands.

A headed goal by Martin Harnik from a cross from the left got Stuttgart on the board with 19 minutes to play. With ten minutes remaining, substitute Shinji Okazaki's shot hit the goal post. Harnik was there for the rebound, kicking the ball straight into goalkeeper Manuel Neuer, and then converting on the second attempt low right footed, making it a 3–2 game. Substitute Anatoliy Tymoshchuk came on for Munich as manager Jupp Heynckes tried to stop Stuttgart's momentum. Stuttgart did not seriously threaten for the rest of the match.

The win gave Munich their 16th DFB-Pokal title. The match was Heynckes' final game as manager of Munich. Seven days prior to the match, Munich had won the Champions League title. Earlier, they dominated the Bundesliga, securing the title earlier in the season than any previous team. Winning the DFB-Pokal thus completed a continental treble by Munich. They are just the seventh European team ever, and first German team, to complete the treble. Celtic was the first team to accomplish the feat in 1967. Since then, Ajax (1972), PSV Eindhoven (1988), Manchester United (1999), Barcelona (2009 and 2015) and Internazionale (2010) have accomplished the feat. Bayern repeated their treble-winning performance in 2020, joining Barça as the only sides to do that twice.

=== Details ===
1 June 2013
20:00 CEST

Bayern Munich	3–2	VfB Stuttgart
Müller 37' (pen.); Gómez 48', 61'	Report	Harnik 71', 80'

Olympiastadion, Berlin
Attendance: 74,420
Referee: Manuel Gräfe (Berlin)

Bayern Munich	VfB Stuttgart

GK	1	(Germany) Manuel Neuer
RB	21	(Germany) Philipp Lahm (c)
CB	5	(Belgium) Daniel Van Buyten
CB	17	(Germany) Jérôme Boateng
LB	27	(Austria) David Alaba
CM	8	(Spain) Javi Martínez
CM	31	(Germany) Bastian Schweinsteiger	(yellow card) 50'
RW	10	(Netherlands) Arjen Robben		(substituted off) 83'
AM	25	(Germany) Thomas Müller
LW	7	(France) Franck Ribéry		(substituted off) 90+1'
CF	33	(Germany) Mario Gómez		(substituted off) 62'
Substitutes:
GK	22	(Germany) Tom Starke
DF	13	(Brazil) Rafinha
DF	26	(Germany) Diego Contento
MF	11	(Switzerland) Xherdan Shaqiri		(substituted on) 90+1'
MF	44	(Ukraine) Anatoliy Tymoshchuk		(substituted on) 83'
FW	9	(Croatia) Mario Mandžukić	(yellow card) 90+4'	(substituted on) 62'
FW	14	(Peru) Claudio Pizarro
Manager:
(Germany) Jupp Heynckes

GK	1	(Germany) Sven Ulreich
RB	24	(Germany) Antonio Rüdiger
CB	5	(Germany) Serdar Tasci (c)
CB	6	(Germany) Georg Niedermeier
LB	21	(Italy) Cristian Molinaro		(substituted off) 67'
CM	20	(Germany) Christian Gentner
CM	15	(Ivory Coast) Arthur Boka	(yellow card) 85'
RW	7	(Austria) Martin Harnik
AM	44	(Romania) Alexandru Maxim		(substituted off) 62'
LW	16	(Guinea) Ibrahima Traoré	(yellow card) 36'	(substituted off) 75'
CF	9	(Bosnia and Herzegovina) Vedad Ibišević	(yellow card) 90+1'
Substitutes:
GK	22	(Germany) Marc Ziegler
DF	2	(Japan) Gōtoku Sakai		(substituted on) 67'
DF	12	(Germany) Benedikt Röcker
MF	4	(Denmark) William Kvist
MF	26	(Austria) Raphael Holzhauser
MF	31	(Japan) Shinji Okazaki		(substituted on) 62'
FW	18	(Germany) Cacau		(substituted on) 75'
Manager:
(Germany) Bruno Labbadia

Assistant referees:
Guido Kleve (Nordhorn)
Thorsten Schiffner (Konstanz)
Fourth official:
Guido Winkmann (Kerken)

Match rules

- 90 minutes.
- 30 minutes of extra time if necessary.
- Penalty shoot-out if scores still level.
- Seven named substitutes, of which up to three may be used.
