= Albert Dusch =

German football referee

- Full name: Albert Dusch
- Born: 6 December 1912; Germany
- Died: 27 October 2002 (aged 89) unknown

International
Years	League	Role
1954–1962	FIFA-listed	Referee

Albert Dusch (6 December 1912 – 27 October 2002) was a renowned German football referee. He was known as the first German referee to appear in an international match after World War II.

He served as a referee in two FIFA World Cups (1958 and 1962). Before his career in refereeing, he was a goalkeeper for 1. FC Kaiserslautern. When he was sent off and banned for three months, he was bored and became interested in refereeing. Dusch became known to a wider audience in the 1950s as the “referee of the grand gesture”. He was an internationally respected referee who was often used in the early days of European club competitions and at football world championships.

== World career ==
The highlight of Dusch's career began with his appearances at the FIFA World Cups 1958 in Sweden and 1962 in Chile. In Sweden he refereed the group game between Brazil and England, which ended 0:0. This result was not only the Brazilians' only loss of a point in the tournament but also their first goalless game at a World Cup. Dusch also officiated the game between the USSR and England, which decided the advance to the quarter-finals, which the USSR won 1-0.

Albert Dusch was used as a linesman in four other games of the tournament. The highlight here was the final between Brazil and Sweden, in which the South Americans secured their first world championship title with a 5-2 victory over the hosts. Dusch is the only German referee - alongside Rudi Glöckner, who was appointed by the GDR association at the time and who led the final between Brazil and Italy in the 1970 in Mexico - who was used in a World Cup final.

At the 1962 World Cup in Chile, Dusch officiated the group game in which the USSR defeated the Yugoslavian national team 2-0. This was also the 24th and last international match of his career as the main referee. In three other games, including the game for third place, in which Chile beat Yugoslavia 1-0, he acted as a linesman. At this tournament, he was also the oldest referee at the age of 49.

A total of ten participations in final round games of the World Cup is a record for a German referee, which Dusch holds together with Mannheimer Kurt Tschenscher, who played the same number of games in the World Cups of 1966, 1970, and 1974.
