= 1967 DFB-Pokal final =

- Match programme cover
- Event: 1966–67 DFB-Pokal
| Hamburger SV | Bayern Munich |
| 0 | 4 |
- Date: 10 June 1967
- Venue: Neckarstadion, Stuttgart
- Referee: Karl Niemeyer (Bad Godesberg)
- Attendance: 68,000

The 1967 DFB-Pokal final decided the winner of the 1966–67 DFB-Pokal, the 24th season of Germany's knockout football cup competition. It was played on 10 June 1967 at the Neckarstadion in Stuttgart. Bayern Munich won the match 4–0 against Hamburger SV, to claim their 3rd cup title.

== Route to the final ==
The DFB-Pokal began with 34 teams in a single-elimination knockout cup competition. There were a total of five rounds leading up to the final. In the qualification round, all but four teams were given a bye. Teams were drawn against each other, and the winner after 90 minutes would advance. If still tied, 30 minutes of extra time was played. If the score was still level, a replay would take place at the original away team's stadium. If still level after 90 minutes, 30 minutes of extra time was played. If the score was still level, a drawing of lots would decide who would advance to the next round.

Note: In all results below, the score of the finalist is given first (H: home; A: away).

| Hamburger SV | | Round | Bayern Munich |
|---|---|---|---|---|
| Opponent | Result | 1966–67 DFB-Pokal | Opponent | Result |
| Altonaer FC 93 (A) | 6–0 | Round 1 | Hertha BSC (A) | 3–2 (a.e.t.) |
| 1. FC Köln (A); (H) | 0–0 (a.e.t.); 2–0 (replay) | Round of 16 | SpVgg Erkenschwick (A) | 3–1 |
| Kickers Offenbach (A) (H) | 0–0 (a.e.t.); 2–0 (replay) | Quarter-finals | Schalke 04 (A) | 3–2 |
| Alemannia Aachen (H) | 3–1 | Semi-finals | 1860 Munich (H) | 3–1 |

== Match ==
=== Details ===
10 June 1967
16:00 CET

| Hamburger SV | 0–4 | Bayern Munich |
|---|---|---|
| | Report | Müller 23', 76'; Ohlhauser 72'; Brenninger 85' (pen.) |

Neckarstadion, Stuttgart
Attendance: 68,000
Referee: Karl Niemeyer (Bad Godesberg)

| Hamburger SV | Bayern Munich |

| GK | 1 | (West Germany) Horst Schnoor |
| SW | | (West Germany) Willi Schulz |
| RB | | (West Germany) Dieter Strauß |
| CB | | (West Germany) Helmut Sandmann |
| CB | | (West Germany) Egon Horst |
| LB | | (West Germany) Jürgen Kurbjuhn |
| CM | | (West Germany) Manfred Pohlschmidt |
| CM | | (West Germany) Hans Schulz |
| RW | | (West Germany) Bernd Dörfel |
| CF | 9 | (West Germany) Uwe Seeler (c) |
| LW | | (West Germany) Gert Dörfel |
Manager:
(West Germany) Josef Schneider

| GK | 1 | (West Germany) Sepp Maier |
| RB | | (West Germany) Peter Kupferschmidt |
| CB | | (West Germany) Franz Beckenbauer |
| CB | | (West Germany) Werner Olk (c) |
| LB | | (West Germany) Hans-Georg Schwarzenbeck |
| CM | | (West Germany) Franz Roth |
| CM | | (West Germany) Dieter Koulmann |
| RF | | (West Germany) Rudolf Nafziger |
| CF | | (West Germany) Rainer Ohlhauser |
| CF | | (West Germany) Gerd Müller |
| LF | | (West Germany) Dieter Brenninger |
Manager:
(Socialist Federal Republic of Yugoslavia) Zlatko Čajkovski

Match rules

- 90 minutes.
- 30 minutes of extra time if necessary.
- Replay if scores still level.
- No substitutions.
