= 2005 DFB-Pokal final =

- Match programme cover
- Event: 2004–05 DFB-Pokal
Schalke 04	Bayern Munich
1	2
- Date: 28 May 2005
- Venue: Olympiastadion, Berlin
- Referee: Florian Meyer (Burgdorf)
- Attendance: 74,349
- Weather: Clear; 30 °C (86 °F); 33% humidity

The 2005 DFB-Pokal final decided the winner of the 2004–05 DFB-Pokal, the 62nd season of Germany's premier knockout football cup competition. It was played on 28 May 2005 at the Olympiastadion in Berlin. Bayern Munich won the match 2–1 against Schalke 04, giving them their 12th cup title.

== Route to the final ==
The DFB-Pokal began with 64 teams in a single-elimination knockout cup competition. There were a total of five rounds leading up to the final. Teams were drawn against each other, and the winner after 90 minutes would advance. If still tied, 30 minutes of extra time was played. If the score was still level, a penalty shoot-out was used to determine the winner.

Note: In all results below, the score of the finalist is given first (H: home; A: away).

Schalke 04		Round	Bayern Munich
Opponent	Result	2004–05 DFB-Pokal	Opponent	Result
Hertha BSC Amateure (A)	2–0	Round 1	TSV Völpke (A)	6–0
1. FC Kaiserslautern (A)	4–4 (a.e.t.) (4–3 p)	Round 2	VfL Osnabrück (A)	3–2
Eintracht Frankfurt (A)	2–0	Round of 16	VfB Stuttgart (H)	3–0
Hannover 96 (H)	3–1	Quarter-finals	SC Freiburg (A)	7–0
Werder Bremen (H)	2–2 (a.e.t.) (5–4 p)	Semi-finals	Arminia Bielefeld (A)	2–0

== Match ==
=== Details ===
28 May 2005
20:45 CEST

Schalke 04	1–2	Bayern Munich
Lincoln 45' (pen.)	Report	Makaay 42'; Salihamidžić 76'

Olympiastadion, Berlin
Attendance: 74,349
Referee: Florian Meyer (Burgdorf)

Schalke 04	Bayern Munich

GK	1	(Germany) Frank Rost (c)
RB	18	(Netherlands) Niels Oude Kamphuis		(substituted off) 46'
CB	5	(Brazil) Marcelo Bordon
CB	20	(Serbia and Montenegro) Mladen Krstajić	(yellow card) 79'
LB	3	(Georgia (country)) Levan Kobiashvili	(yellow card) 83'
RM	14	(Germany) Gerald Asamoah
CM	2	(Denmark) Christian Poulsen	(yellow card) 51'	(substituted off) 82'
CM	17	(Belgium) Sven Vermant	(yellow card) 23'
LM	10	(Brazil) Lincoln
CF	9	(Brazil) Aílton		(substituted off) 71'
CF	11	(Denmark) Ebbe Sand
Substitutes:
GK	13	(Germany) Christofer Heimeroth
DF	15	(Poland) Tomasz Wałdoch
DF	16	(Uruguay) Darío Rodríguez		(substituted on) 82'
DF	23	(Germany) Fabian Lamotte
MF	6	(Turkey) Hamit Altıntop	(yellow card) 63'	(substituted on) 46'
FW	7	(Germany) Michael Delura
FW	26	(Germany) Mike Hanke		(substituted on) 71'
Manager:
(Germany) Ralf Rangnick

GK	1	(Germany) Oliver Kahn (c)
RB	2	(France) Willy Sagnol		(substituted off) 90+2'
CB	3	(Brazil) Lúcio
CB	5	(Croatia) Robert Kovač
LB	69	(France) Bixente Lizarazu
DM	6	(Argentina) Martín Demichelis	(yellow card) 19'
RM	31	(Germany) Bastian Schweinsteiger		(substituted off) 75'
CM	13	(Germany) Michael Ballack	(yellow card) 7'
LM	11	(Brazil) Zé Roberto		(substituted off) 82'
CF	10	(Netherlands) Roy Makaay	(yellow card) 90'
CF	14	(Peru) Claudio Pizarro
Substitutes:
GK	22	(Germany) Michael Rensing
MF	7	(Germany) Mehmet Scholl
MF	8	(Germany) Torsten Frings		(substituted on) 82'
MF	20	(Bosnia and Herzegovina) Hasan Salihamidžić		(substituted on) 75'
MF	23	(England) Owen Hargreaves
MF	26	(Germany) Sebastian Deisler		(substituted on) 90+2'
FW	33	(Peru) Paolo Guerrero
Manager:
(Germany) Felix Magath

Assistant referees:
Thomas Frank (Hanover)
Carsten Kadach (Suderburg)
Fourth official:
Uwe Kemmling (Burgwedel)

Match rules

- 90 minutes.
- 30 minutes of extra time if necessary.
- Penalty shoot-out if scores still level.
- Seven named substitutes, of which up to three may be used.
