= 2000 DFB-Pokal final =

- Match programme cover
- Event: 1999–2000 DFB-Pokal
Werder Bremen	Bayern Munich
0	3
- Date: 6 May 2000
- Venue: Olympiastadion, Berlin
- Referee: Alfons Berg (Konz)
- Attendance: 76,000
- Weather: Clear; 24 °C (75 °F); 25% humidity

The 2000 DFB-Pokal final decided the winner of the 1999–2000 DFB-Pokal, the 57th season of Germany's premier knockout football cup competition. It was played on 6 May 2000 at the Olympiastadion in Berlin. Bayern Munich won the match 3–0 against Werder Bremen to claim their 10th cup title.

== Route to the final ==
The DFB-Pokal began with 64 teams in a single-elimination knockout cup competition. There were a total of six rounds leading up to the final. In the first two rounds, Bundesliga teams participating in European competitions were given a bye. Teams were drawn against each other, and the winner after 90 minutes would advance. If still tied, 30 minutes of extra time was played. If the score was still level, a penalty shoot-out was used to determine the winner.

Note: In all results below, the score of the finalist is given first (H: home; A: away).

Werder Bremen		Round	Bayern Munich
Opponent	Result	1999–2000 DFB-Pokal	Opponent	Result
1. FC Kaiserslautern (H)	2–2 (a.e.t.) (4–3 p)	Round 3	SV Meppen (A)	4–1
SSV Ulm (H)	2–1	Round of 16	Waldhof Mannheim (A)	3–0
VfL Bochum (A)	2–1	Quarter-finals	Mainz 05 (H)	3–0
Stuttgarter Kickers (H)	2–1 (a.e.t.)	Semi-finals	Hansa Rostock (H)	3–2

== Match ==
=== Details ===
6 May 2000
19:30 CEST

Werder Bremen	0–3	Bayern Munich
	Report	Élber 57'; Paulo Sérgio 83'; Scholl 90'

Olympiastadion, Berlin
Attendance: 76,000
Referee: Alfons Berg (Konz)

Werder Bremen	Bayern Munich

GK	1	(Germany) Frank Rost	Yellow card
RB	22	(Germany) Torsten Frings	Yellow card
CB	33	(Germany) Mike Barten
CB	6	(Germany) Frank Baumann
LB	13	(Germany) Andree Wiedener	Yellow card	(substituted off) 16'
DM	5	(Germany) Dieter Eilts (c)		(substituted off) 64'
CM	8	(Germany) Bernhard Trares	Yellow card	(substituted off) 72'
CM	17	(Germany) Marco Bode
AM	18	(Austria) Andi Herzog	Yellow card
CF	10	(Peru) Claudio Pizarro
CF	32	(Brazil) Aílton	Yellow card
Substitutes:
GK	12	(Germany) Stefan Brasas
DF	19	(Ukraine) Viktor Skrypnyk		(substituted on) 16'
DF	28	(Namibia) Razundara Tjikuzu
MF	3	(Switzerland) Raphaël Wicky		(substituted on) 72'
MF	4	(Germany) Dirk Flock		(substituted on) 64'
FW	9	(Federal Republic of Yugoslavia) Rade Bogdanović
FW	25	(Germany) Sören Seidel
Manager:
(Germany) Thomas Schaaf

GK	1	(Germany) Oliver Kahn
RB	2	(Germany) Markus Babbel
CB	5	(Sweden) Patrik Andersson
CB	4	(Ghana) Samuel Kuffour
LB	18	(Germany) Michael Tarnat
RW	20	(Bosnia and Herzegovina) Hasan Salihamidžić	Yellow card
CM	11	(Germany) Stefan Effenberg (c)	Yellow card	(substituted off) 80'
CM	16	(Germany) Jens Jeremies	Yellow card
LW	13	(Brazil) Paulo Sérgio
CF	9	(Brazil) Giovane Élber	Yellow card	(substituted off) 86'
CF	19	(Germany) Carsten Jancker		(substituted off) 73'
Substitutes:
GK	22	(Germany) Bernd Dreher
DF	3	(France) Bixente Lizarazu
DF	25	(Germany) Thomas Linke
MF	6	(Germany) Michael Wiesinger
MF	7	(Germany) Mehmet Scholl		(substituted on) 86'
MF	17	(Germany) Thorsten Fink		(substituted on) 80'
FW	24	(Paraguay) Roque Santa Cruz		(substituted on) 73'
Manager:
(Germany) Ottmar Hitzfeld

Match rules

- 90 minutes.
- 30 minutes of extra time if necessary.
- Penalty shoot-out if scores still level.
- Seven named substitutes, of which up to three may be used.
