= DFB-Pokal =

- Logo since 2026–27 DFB-Pokal season
- Organiser(s): Deutscher Fußball-Bund
- Founded: 1935; 91 years ago
- Region: Germany
- Teams: 64
- Qualifier for: UEFA Europa League
- Domestic cup: Supercup
- Current champions: Bayern Munich (21st title)
- Most championships: Bayern Munich (21 titles)
- Broadcasters: ARD; ZDF; RTL; Sky Sport
- Website: dfb.de/pokal
- 2026–27 DFB-Pokal

The DFB-Pokal (German: [ˌdeːʔɛfˈbeː poˈkaːl]), also known as the German Cup in English, is a German knockout football cup competition held annually by the German Football Association (DFB), and "Pokal" means "cup" in German. Sixty-four teams participate in the competition, including all clubs from the Bundesliga and the 2. Bundesliga along with the four best teams from the 3. Liga. It is considered the second-most important club title in German football after the Bundesliga championship. Taking place from August until May, the winner qualifies for the DFL-Supercup and the UEFA Europa League unless the winner already qualifies for the UEFA Champions League in the Bundesliga.

The competition was founded in 1935, then called the Tschammer-Pokal. The first titleholders were 1. FC Nürnberg. In 1937, Schalke 04 were the first team to win the double. The Tschammer-Pokal was suspended in 1944 due to World War II and disbanded following the demise of Nazi Germany. In 1952–53, the cup was reinstated in West Germany as the DFB-Pokal, named after the DFB, and was won by Rot-Weiss Essen. (FDGB-Pokal, the East German equivalent, started in 1949 and operated through the 1991 season, when it merged with the DFB-Pokal).

Bayern Munich have won a record 21 titles. They are also the current holders, having beaten VfB Stuttgart 3–0 in the 2026 final. Fortuna Düsseldorf hold the record for most consecutive tournament game wins (18) between 1978 and 1981, winning the cup in 1979 and 1980.

== Format ==
The competition format has varied considerably since the inception of the Tschammer-Pokal in 1935.

=== Participation ===
The DFB-Pokal begins with a round of 64 teams. The 36 teams of the Bundesliga and 2. Bundesliga, along with the top four finishers of the 3. Liga are automatically qualified for the tournament. Of the remaining slots, 21 are given to the cup winners of the regional football associations, the Verbandspokale. The three remaining slots are given to the three regional associations with the most men's teams. They may assign the slot as they see fit but usually give it to the runner-up in the association cup.

As every team taking part in the German football league system is entitled to participate in local tournaments which qualify for the association cups, every team can, in principle, compete in the DFB-Pokal. The only exception is that reserve teams (e.g. Bayern Munich II) are ineligible to enter.

=== Seeding ===
For the first round, the 64 teams are split into two pots of 32. One pot contains the 18 teams from the previous season of the Bundesliga and the top 14 teams from the previous season of the 2. Bundesliga. The other pot contains the bottom 4 teams from the previous season of the 2. Bundesliga, the top 4 teams from the previous season of the 3. Liga, and the 24 amateur teams that qualified through regional football tournaments. Teams from one pot are drawn against teams from the other pot. Since 1982, teams from the pot containing amateur teams have played the game at home.

For the second round, the teams are again divided into two pots according to the same principles. Depending on the results of the first round, the pots might not be equal in terms of numbers. Teams from one pot are drawn against teams from the other pot until one pot is empty. The remaining teams are then drawn against each other, with the team first drawn playing the game at home.

For the remaining rounds, other than the final, the teams are drawn from one pot. Since 1985, the final has been held in the Olympic Stadium in Berlin. This decision has been made after West Germany was nominated host nation of the UEFA Euro Championship 1988, and decided for political reasons not to host any games in West Berlin.

=== Match rules ===
Extra time will be played if the scores are level after 90 minutes, with a penalty shootout following if needed.

== History ==
Historically, the number of participants in the main tournament has varied between four from 1956 until 1960, and 128 from 1973 through 1982, resulting in tournaments of two to seven rounds. Since the inception of the Bundesliga in 1963, all clubs from the Bundesliga are automatically qualified for the DFB-Pokal, as are all clubs from the 2. Bundesliga since its inception in 1974. Reserve sides, for most of the time, were allowed to participate in the DFB-Pokal, but have been excluded since 2008.

The final has been held at the Olympic Stadium in Berlin every season since 1985. Before 1985, the host of the final was determined on short notice. In the decision, the German Football Association took into consideration that, due to the political situation between West Germany and East Germany, Berlin was not chosen to be a venue for the UEFA Euro 1988.

Originally, the cup games were held over two 45 minute halves with two 15 minute overtime periods in case of a draw. If the score was still level after 120 minutes, the game was replayed with the home field right reversed. In the 1939 Tschammer-Pokal, the semi-final between Waldhof Mannheim and Wacker Wien was played to a draw three times before the game was decided by lot. The German Football Association decided to hold a penalty shootout if the replay was another draw after a similar situation arose in the 1970 cup, when the match between Alemannia Aachen and Werder Bremen had to be decided by lot after two draws.

In 1971–72 and 1972–73, the matches were held over two legs. The second leg was extended by two additional 15-minute overtime periods if the aggregate was a draw after both legs. In case the extension brought no decision, a penalty shootout was held.

In 1977, the final (between 1. FC Köln and Hertha BSC) had to be replayed, leading to great logistical difficulties. In the aftermath, the DFB opted not to replay cup finals in the future, instead holding a penalty shootout after extra time. Eventually, this change was extended to all cup games in 1991.

=== International qualification ===
Since 1960, the winner of the DFB-Pokal qualified for the European Cup Winners' Cup. If the cup winner had already qualified for the European Club Champions Cup, the losing finalist moved into the Cup Winners' Cup instead. Following the abolition of the Cup Winners' Cup in 1999, the winner of the DFB-Pokal qualified for the UEFA Cup (known as the UEFA Europa League since 2009). If the DFB-Pokal winner, or both finalists, qualify through the Bundesliga for European cup competitions, the best placed team of the Bundesliga not already qualified for at least the Europa League receives the spot.

=== Tschammerpokal ===
The first German cup was held in 1935. It was then called von Tschammer und Osten Pokal, or Tschammerpokal for short, named after Reichssportführer (Sports Chief of the Reich) Hans von Tschammer und Osten. The first final was contested between the two most successful clubs of that era, 1. FC Nürnberg and Schalke 04, with Nürnberg winning 2–0. After the last Tschammerpokal was held in 1943, the cup was not held for almost ten years, being re-introduced by the German Football Association (DFB) in 1952 under its current name, DFB-Pokal. In 1965, the original trophy, Goldfasanen-Pokal, was replaced by the trophy which is still awarded today, because the original reminded DFB president Peco Bauwens of the Nazi era.

=== Giant killing ===
Old logo of the DFB-Pokal (2016–2026)

Originally, the DFB-Pokal was a competition open to clubs from the top divisions of German football only. This continued after the establishment of the Bundesliga in 1963. Semi-professional and amateur clubs could only enter the competition from 1974 onwards, when it was enlarged. Up until 2008, only the top two divisions of German football, the Bundesliga and 2. Bundesliga, were fully professional but from 2008, with the establishment of the 3. Liga, the third tier also became fully professional.

From the start, the new match ups between Bundesliga and amateurs (most usually third division clubs) became a source of surprises. Hamburger SV's second round loss to VfB Eppingen in 1974 was often titled the "mother of all cup upsets" (German: Die Mutter aller Pokalsensationen), the first instance of an amateur side knocking out a Bundesliga club. It took until 1990 for a fourth division side to achieve the same, when SpVgg Fürth took Borussia Dortmund out of the competition. Further milestones were the reserve side of Hertha BSC, Hertha BSC II, reaching the cup final in 1993, a first for a third division club and a reserve team. In 1997, Eintracht Trier proved too strong for both the UEFA Cup and Champions League winners, knocking Schalke 04 and Borussia Dortmund out of the competition. In 2000, 1. FC Magdeburg became the first fourth division side to eliminate two Bundesliga clubs in one season. Hannover 96, then playing in the 2. Bundesliga, became cup winners after eliminating several Bundesliga teams in the process. Kickers Offenbach won all matches including the semi-final as a 2. Bundesliga team, but were promoted to the Bundesliga a week before they won the cup final.

Surprise results in the cup attract strong media coverage in Germany and, at times, abroad. When TSV Vestenbergsgreuth eliminated Bayern Munich in 1994, who were then coached by the Italian Giovanni Trapattoni, Italian sports daily La Gazzetta dello Sport reported on its front page "Club di dilettanti elimina Trapattoni" ("Amateur club eliminate Trapattoni").

== Records ==
Having won 21 titles, Bayern Munich has been the most successful team in the cup since they won their fourth title in 1969. Fortuna Düsseldorf established a record for consecutive German Cup match victories (18 straight victories between 1978 and 1981, taking the trophy in 1979 and 1980). Werder Bremen has won the most consecutive home games (37 between 1988 and 2019). Bayern Munich has won the most consecutive away games (33 between 2009 and 2020). Schalke 04 holds the record for the biggest win in a DFB-Pokal final, winning 5–0 against 1. FC Kaiserslautern in 1972 and 5–0 against MSV Duisburg in 2011.

== Finals ==
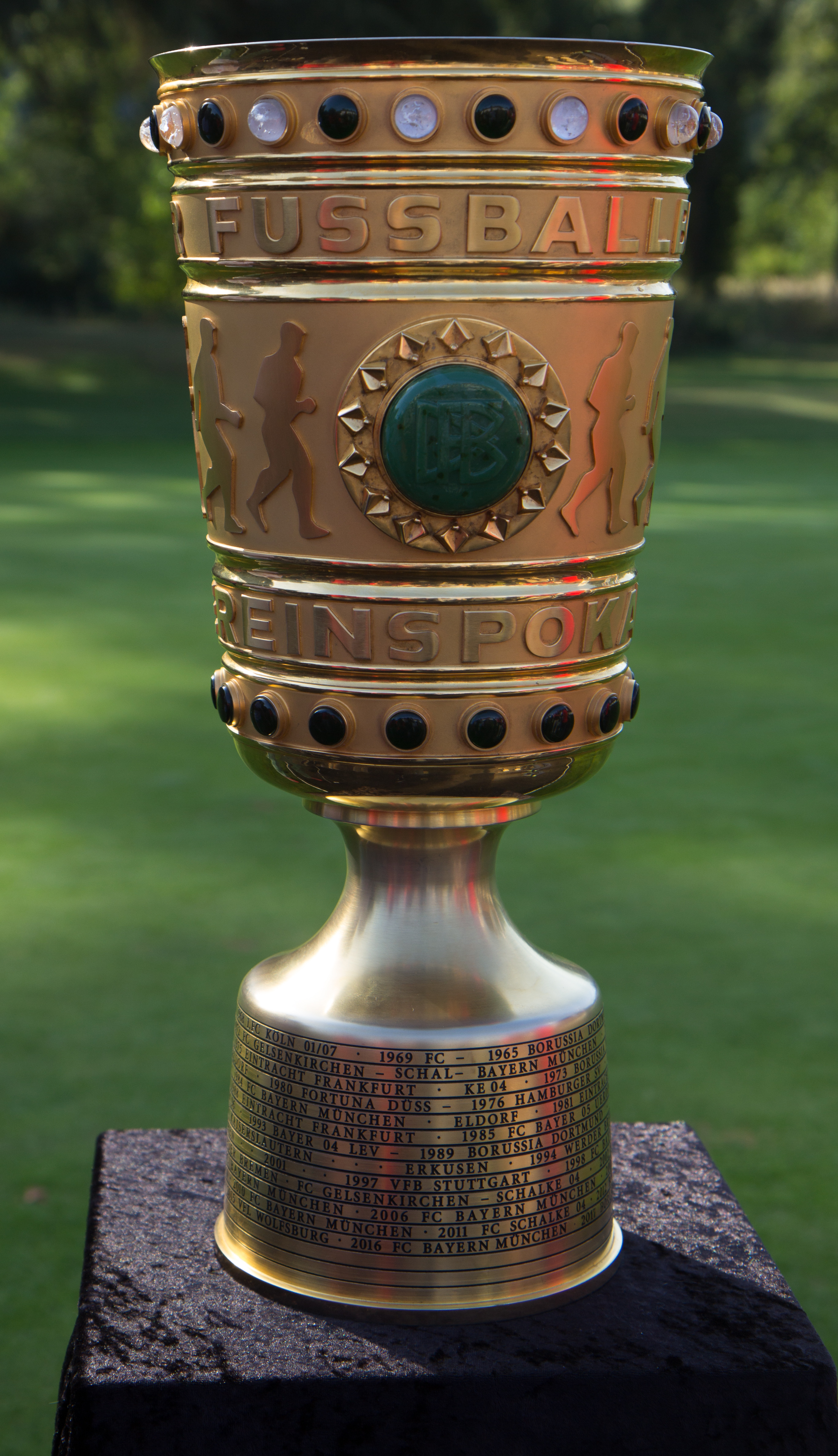
The Trophy

=== Tschammer-Pokal ===
Year	Winners	Runners-up	Result	Date	Venue	Attendance
1935	1. FC Nürnberg	Schalke 04	2–0	08/12/35	Düsseldorf	55,000
1936	VfB Leipzig	Schalke 04	2–1	03/01/37	Berlin	70,000
1937	Schalke 04	Fortuna Düsseldorf	2–1	09/01/38	Cologne	72,000
1938	Rapid Wien	FSV Frankfurt	3–1	08/01/39	Berlin	38,000
1939	1. FC Nürnberg	Waldhof Mannheim	2–0	28/04/40	Berlin	60,000
1940	Dresdner SC	1. FC Nürnberg	2–1 (a.e.t.)	01/12/40	Berlin	60,000
1941	Dresdner SC	Schalke 04	2–1	02/11/41	Berlin	65,000
1942	1860 Munich	Schalke 04	2–0	15/11/42	Berlin	80,000
1943	First Vienna	Luftwaffen-SV Hamburg	3–2 (a.e.t.)	31/10/43	Stuttgart	45,000

=== DFB-Pokal ===
Season	Winners	Runners-up	Result	Date	Venue	Attendance
1952–53	Rot-Weiss Essen	Alemannia Aachen	2–1	01/05/53	Düsseldorf	40,000
1953–54	VfB Stuttgart	1. FC Köln	1–0 (a.e.t.)	17/04/54	Ludwigshafen	60,000
1954–55	Karlsruher SC	Schalke 04	3–2	21/05/55	Braunschweig	25,000
1955–56	Karlsruher SC	Hamburger SV	3–1	05/08/56	Karlsruhe	25,000
1956–57	Bayern Munich	Fortuna Düsseldorf	1–0	29/12/57	Augsburg	42,000
1957–58	VfB Stuttgart	Fortuna Düsseldorf	4–3 (a.e.t.)	16/10/58	Kassel	28,000
1958–59	Schwarz-Weiss Essen	Borussia Neunkirchen	5–2	27/12/59	Kassel	20,000
1959–60	Borussia Mönchengladbach	Karlsruher SC	3–2	05/10/60	Düsseldorf	50,000
1960–61	Werder Bremen	1. FC Kaiserslautern	2–0	13/09/61	Gelsenkirchen	18,000
1961–62	1. FC Nürnberg	Fortuna Düsseldorf	2–1 (a.e.t.)	29/08/62	Hannover	41,000
1962–63	Hamburger SV	Borussia Dortmund	3–0	14/08/63	Hannover	68,000
1963–64	1860 Munich	Eintracht Frankfurt	2–0	13/06/64	Stuttgart	45,000
1964–65	Borussia Dortmund	Alemannia Aachen	2–0	22/05/65	Hannover	55,000
1965–66	Bayern Munich	Meidericher SV	4–2	04/06/66	Frankfurt am Main	62,000
1966–67	Bayern Munich	Hamburger SV	4–0	10/06/67	Stuttgart	67,000
1967–68	1. FC Köln	VfL Bochum	4–1	09/06/68	Ludwigshafen	60,000
1968–69	Bayern Munich	Schalke 04	2–1	14/06/69	Frankfurt am Main	60,000
1969–70	Kickers Offenbach	1. FC Köln	2–1	29/08/70	Hannover	50,000
1970–71	Bayern Munich	1. FC Köln	2–1 (a.e.t.)	19/06/71	Stuttgart	71,000
1971–72	Schalke 04	1. FC Kaiserslautern	5–0	01/07/72	Hannover	61,000
1972–73	Borussia Mönchengladbach	1. FC Köln	2–1 (a.e.t.)	23/06/73	Düsseldorf	69,000
1973–74	Eintracht Frankfurt	Hamburger SV	3–1 (a.e.t.)	17/08/74	Düsseldorf	52,000
1974–75	Eintracht Frankfurt	MSV Duisburg	1–0	21/06/75	Hannover	43,000
1975–76	Hamburger SV	1. FC Kaiserslautern	2–0	26/06/76	Frankfurt am Main	61,000
1976–77	1. FC Köln	Hertha BSC	1–1 (a.e.t.); 1–0 replay	28/05/77; 30/05/77	Hannover	54,000; 35,000
1977–78	1. FC Köln	Fortuna Düsseldorf	2–0	15/04/78	Gelsenkirchen	70,000
1978–79	Fortuna Düsseldorf	Hertha BSC	1–0 (a.e.t.)	23/06/79	Hannover	56,000
1979–80	Fortuna Düsseldorf	1. FC Köln	2–1	04/06/80	Gelsenkirchen	56,000
1980–81	Eintracht Frankfurt	1. FC Kaiserslautern	3–1	02/05/81	Stuttgart	71,000
1981–82	Bayern Munich	1. FC Nürnberg	4–2	01/05/82	Frankfurt am Main	61,000
1982–83	1. FC Köln	Fortuna Köln	1–0	11/06/83	Cologne	61,000
1983–84	Bayern Munich	Borussia Mönchengladbach	1–1 (7–6 p)	31/05/84	Frankfurt am Main	61,000
1984–85	Bayer Uerdingen	Bayern Munich	2–1	26/05/85	West Berlin	70,000
1985–86	Bayern Munich	VfB Stuttgart	5–2	03/05/86	West Berlin	76,000
1986–87	Hamburger SV	Stuttgarter Kickers	3–1	20/06/87	West Berlin	76,000
1987–88	Eintracht Frankfurt	VfL Bochum	1–0	28/05/88	West Berlin	76,000
1988–89	Borussia Dortmund	Werder Bremen	4–1	24/06/89	West Berlin	76,000
1989–90	1. FC Kaiserslautern	Werder Bremen	3–2	19/05/90	West Berlin	76,000
1990–91	Werder Bremen	1. FC Köln	1–1 (4–3 p)	22/06/91	Berlin	73,000
1991–92	Hannover 96	Borussia Mönchengladbach	0–0 (4–3 p)	23/05/92	Berlin	76,000
1992–93	Bayer Leverkusen	Hertha BSC II	1–0	12/06/93	Berlin	76,000
1993–94	Werder Bremen	Rot-Weiss Essen	3–1	14/05/94	Berlin	76,000
1994–95	Borussia Mönchengladbach	VfL Wolfsburg	3–0	24/06/95	Berlin	75,700
1995–96	1. FC Kaiserslautern	Karlsruher SC	1–0	25/05/96	Berlin	75,800
1996–97	VfB Stuttgart	Energie Cottbus	2–0	14/06/97	Berlin	76,400
1997–98	Bayern Munich	MSV Duisburg	2–1	16/05/98	Berlin	75,800
1998–99	Werder Bremen	Bayern Munich	1–1 (5–4 p)	12/06/99	Berlin	75,841
1999–2000	Bayern Munich	Werder Bremen	3–0	06/05/00	Berlin	76,000
2000–01	Schalke 04	Union Berlin	2–0	26/05/01	Berlin	73,011
2001–02	Schalke 04	Bayer Leverkusen	4–2	11/05/02	Berlin	70,000
2002–03	Bayern Munich	1. FC Kaiserslautern	3–1	31/05/03	Berlin	70,490
2003–04	Werder Bremen	Alemannia Aachen	3–2	29/05/04	Berlin	71,682
2004–05	Bayern Munich	Schalke 04	2–1	28/05/05	Berlin	74,349
2005–06	Bayern Munich	Eintracht Frankfurt	1–0	29/04/06	Berlin	74,349
2006–07	1. FC Nürnberg	VfB Stuttgart	3–2 (a.e.t.)	26/05/07	Berlin	74,220
2007–08	Bayern Munich	Borussia Dortmund	2–1 (a.e.t.)	19/04/08	Berlin	74,244
2008–09	Werder Bremen	Bayer Leverkusen	1–0	30/05/09	Berlin	72,244
2009–10	Bayern Munich	Werder Bremen	4–0	15/05/10	Berlin	72,954
2010–11	Schalke 04	MSV Duisburg	5–0	21/05/11	Berlin	75,708
2011–12	Borussia Dortmund	Bayern Munich	5–2	12/05/12	Berlin	75,708
2012–13	Bayern Munich	VfB Stuttgart	3–2	01/06/13	Berlin	75,420
2013–14	Bayern Munich	Borussia Dortmund	2–0 (a.e.t.)	17/05/14	Berlin	76,197
2014–15	VfL Wolfsburg	Borussia Dortmund	3–1	30/05/15	Berlin	75,815
2015–16	Bayern Munich	Borussia Dortmund	0–0 (4–3 p)	21/05/16	Berlin	74,322
2016–17	Borussia Dortmund	Eintracht Frankfurt	2–1	27/05/17	Berlin	74,322
2017–18	Eintracht Frankfurt	Bayern Munich	3–1	19/05/18	Berlin	74,322
2018–19	Bayern Munich	RB Leipzig	3–0	25/05/19	Berlin	74,322
2019–20	Bayern Munich	Bayer Leverkusen	4–2	04/07/20	Berlin	0 (Note: The final was played behind closed doors due to the COVID-19 pandemic in Germany.)
2020–21	Borussia Dortmund	RB Leipzig	4–1	13/05/21	Berlin	0
2021–22	RB Leipzig	SC Freiburg	1–1 (4–2 p)	21/05/22	Berlin	74,322
2022–23	RB Leipzig	Eintracht Frankfurt	2–0	03/06/23	Berlin	74,667
2023–24	Bayer Leverkusen	1. FC Kaiserslautern	1–0	25/05/24	Berlin	74,322
2024–25	VfB Stuttgart	Arminia Bielefeld	4–2	24/05/25	Berlin	74,036
2025–26	Bayern Munich	VfB Stuttgart	3–0	23/05/26	Berlin	74,036

== Performance by club ==
Club	Winners	Runners-up	Winning years
Bayern Munich	21	4	1957, 1966, 1967, 1969, 1971, 1982, 1984, 1986, 1998, 2000, 2003, 2005, 2006, 2008, 2010, 2013, 2014, 2016, 2019, 2020, 2026
Werder Bremen	6	4	1961, 1991, 1994, 1999, 2004, 2009
Schalke 04	5	7	1937, 1972, 2001, 2002, 2011
Borussia Dortmund	5	5	1965, 1989, 2012, 2017, 2021
Eintracht Frankfurt	5	4	1974, 1975, 1981, 1988, 2018
1. FC Köln	4	6	1968, 1977, 1978, 1983
VfB Stuttgart	4	4	1954, 1958, 1997, 2025
1. FC Nürnberg	4	2	1935, 1939, 1962, 2007
Hamburger SV	3	3	1963, 1976, 1987
Borussia Mönchengladbach	3	2	1960, 1973, 1995
1. FC Kaiserslautern	2	6	1990, 1996
Fortuna Düsseldorf	2	5	1979, 1980
Bayer Leverkusen	2	3	1993, 2024
Karlsruher SC	2	2	1955, 1956
RB Leipzig	2	2	2022, 2023
Dresdner SC	2	—	1940, 1941
1860 Munich	2	—	1942, 1964
Rot-Weiss Essen	1	1	1953
VfL Wolfsburg	1	1	2015
KFC Uerdingen 05	1	—	1985
Hannover 96	1	—	1992
1. FC Lokomotive Leipzig	1	—	1936
Kickers Offenbach	1	—	1970
Rapid Wien	1	—	1938
Schwarz-Weiss Essen	1	—	1959
First Vienna	1	—	1943
MSV Duisburg	—	4	—
Alemannia Aachen	—	3	—
VfL Bochum	—	2	—
Hertha BSC	—	2	—
Arminia Bielefeld	—	1	—
Borussia Neunkirchen	—	1	—
Energie Cottbus	—	1	—
Fortuna Köln	—	1	—
FSV Frankfurt	—	1	—
SC Freiburg	—	1	—
Hertha BSC II	—	1	—
Luftwaffen-SV Hamburg	—	1	—
Stuttgarter Kickers	—	1	—
Union Berlin	—	1	—
Waldhof Mannheim	—	1	—

== East German Cup (1949–1991) ==
East Germany also had its own national cup: the FDGB Cup, the cup of the Freie Deutsche Gewerkschaftsbund, the association of the East German trade unions. It was introduced in 1949 and awarded annually until 1991, after German reunification in 1990 led to the merger of the two German football leagues.

== Women's German Cup ==
Since 1981, women's football clubs have competed for the DFB-Pokal Frauen. An East German women's cup was also held from 1987 to 1991.

== Media coverage ==
=== Germany ===
ARD, ZDF, and RTL will broadcast 15 matches per season. All matches will be available on Sky Sport.

=== International ===
For countries and regions without broadcasting rights, all matches will be live via the German Football YouTube channel and DFB Play.

Country	Broadcaster	Ref
Africa	ESPN	
Brazil	ESPN	
Central America	ESPN	
Mexico	ESPN	
Belgium	DAZN	
Canada	DAZN	
New Zealand	DAZN	
Portugal	DAZN	
Bosnia and Herzegovina	Arena Sport	
Montenegro	Arena Sport	
North Macedonia	Arena Sport	
Serbia	Arena Sport	
Croatia	Voyo	
Slovenia	Voyo	
Brunei	Astro	
Malaysia	Astro	
Bulgaria	Diema Sport	
China	CCTV, Migu	
Cyprus	Cablenet	
Czechia	Nova Sport	
Slovakia	Nova Sport	
Denmark	Disney+	
Finland	Disney+	
Sweden	Disney+	
Estonia	Go3 Sport	
Latvia	Go3 Sport	
Lithuania	Go3 Sport	
France	L'Équipe	
France	beIN Sports	
Ghana	Sporty TV	
Kenya	Sporty TV	
Nigeria	Sporty TV	
South Africa	Sporty TV	
Greece	ERT	
Hungary	Sport1	
India	FanCode	
Indonesia	MNC Media	
Ireland	Premier Sports	
United Kingdom	Premier Sports	
Israel	Charlton	
Italy	Como TV	
Japan	Gaora	
Macau	M Plus	
MENA	Abu Dhabi Sports	
Netherlands	Ziggo Sport	
Norway	VG+	
Poland	TVP	
Poland	Eleven Sports	
Romania	Digi Sport	
South Korea	Coupang Play	
Spain	Replay	
Thailand	True Sports	
Turkey	S Sport	
Ukraine	Megogo	
Vietnam	VTVCab	
