= 1941 German Supercup =

1941 Herausforderungskampf
Deutscher Supercup
- Match programme cover
- Event: German Supercup
Dresdner SC	Schalke 04
4	2
- Date: 16 March 1941
- Venue: DSC-Stadion, Dresden
- Attendance: 40,000

The 1941 German Supercup, known as the Herausforderungskampf (English: Challenge Match), was an unofficial edition of the German Supercup, a football match contested by the winners of the previous season's German football championship and Tschammerpokal competitions.

The match was played at the DSC-Stadion in Dresden, and contested by 1940 German football champions Schalke 04 and cup winners Dresdner SC. Dresden won the match 4–2 to claim the unofficial title.

== Teams ==
Team	Qualification
Dresdner SC	1940 Tschammerpokal winners
Schalke 04	1940 German champions

== Match ==
=== Details ===
16 March 1941

Dresdner SC	4–2	Schalke 04
5'	Report	Kuzorra 7'; Burdenski 64'

DSC-Stadion, Dresden
Attendance: 40,000

Dresdner SC	Schalke 04

GK	(Germany) Willibald Kreß
RB	(Germany) Karl Miller
LB	(Germany) Heinz Hempel
RH	(Germany) Herbert Pohl
CH	(Germany) Walter Dzur
LH	(Germany) Helmut Schubert
OR	(Germany) Emanuel Boczek
IR	(Germany) Heinz Schaffer
CF	(Germany) Helmut Schön
IL	(Germany) Fritz Machate
OL	(Germany) Gustav Carstens
Manager:
(Germany) Georg Köhler

GK	(Germany) Hans Klodt
RB	(Germany) Heinz Hinz
LB	(Germany) Otto Schweisfurth
RH	(Germany) Rudolf Gellesch
CH	(Germany) Otto Tibulski
LH	(Germany) Bernhard Füller
OR	(Germany) Herbert Burdenski
IR	(Germany) Fritz Szepan
CF	(Germany) Hermann Eppenhoff
IL	(Germany) Ernst Kuzorra
OL	(Germany) Willi Schuh
Manager:
(Germany) Otto Faist

== See also ==
- 1941 German football championship
- 1941 Tschammerpokal
