= 1941 Tschammerpokal final =

- Match programme cover
- Event: 1941 Tschammerpokal
Dresdner SC	Schalke 04
2	1
- Date: 2 November 1941
- Venue: Olympiastadion, Berlin
- Referee: Helmuth Fink (Frankfurt)
- Attendance: 65,000

The 1941 Tschammerpokal final decided the winner of the 1941 Tschammerpokal, the 7th season of Germany's knockout football cup competition. It was played on 2 November 1941 at the Olympiastadion in Berlin. Dresdner SC won the match 2–1 against Schalke 04, to claim their 2nd cup title.

== Route to the final ==
The Tschammerpokal began the final stage with 64 teams in a single-elimination knockout cup competition. There were a total of five rounds leading up to the final. Teams were drawn against each other, and the winner after 90 minutes would advance. If still tied, 30 minutes of extra time was played. If the score was still level, a replay would take place at the original away team's stadium. If still level after 90 minutes, 30 minutes of extra time was played. If the score was still level, a second replay would take place at the original home team's stadium. If still level after 90 minutes, 30 minutes of extra time was played. If the score was still level, a drawing of lots would decide who would advance to the next round.

Note: In all results below, the score of the finalist is given first (H: home; A: away; N: neutral).

Dresdner SC		Round	Schalke 04
Opponent	Result	1941 Tschammerpokal	Opponent	Result
LSV Wurzen (A)	4–1	Round 1	Rot-Weiss Essen (A)	2–1 (a.e.t.)
Polizei-SV Chemnitz (A)	3–0	Round 2	Fortuna Düsseldorf (H)	4–2
Hannover 96 (H)	9–2	Round of 16	Schwarz-Weiß Essen (A)	5–1
LSV Kamp-Köslin (N)	4–1	Quarter-finals	Austria Wien (H)	4–1
Admira Wien (H)	4–2	Semi-finals	Holstein Kiel (H)	6–0

== Match ==
=== Details ===
2 November 1941

Dresdner SC	2–1	Schalke 04
Kugler 8'; Carstens 88'	Report	Kuzorra 51'

Olympiastadion, Berlin
Attendance: 65,000
Referee: Helmuth Fink (Frankfurt)

Dresdner SC	Schalke 04

GK	1	(Germany) Willibald Kreß
RB		(Germany) Karl Miller
LB		(Germany) Heinz Hempel (c)
RH		(Germany) Herbert Pohl
CH		(Germany) Walter Dzur
LH		(Germany) Helmut Schubert
OR		(Germany) Heiner Kugler
IR		(Germany) Heinz Schaffer
CF		(Germany) Richard Hofmann
IL		(Germany) Helmut Schön
OL		(Germany) Gustav Carstens
Manager:
(Germany) Georg Köhler

GK	1	(Germany) Hans Klodt
RB		(Germany) Hans Bornemann
LB		(Germany) Otto Schweisfurth
RH		(Germany) Bernhard Füller
CH		(Germany) Rudolf Gellesch
LH		(Germany) Herbert Brudenski
OR		(Germany) Ernst Kalwitzki
IR		(Germany) Fritz Szepan
CF		(Germany) Hermann Eppenhoff
IL		(Germany) Ernst Kuzorra (c)
OL		(Germany) Karl Barufka
Manager:
(Germany) Otto Faist

Match rules

- 90 minutes.
- 30 minutes of extra time if necessary.
- Replay if scores still level.
- No substitutions.
