= 1940 Tschammerpokal final =

- Match programme cover
- Event: 1940 Tschammerpokal
1. FC Nürnberg	Dresdner SC
1	2
- After extra time
- Date: 1 December 1940
- Venue: Olympiastadion, Berlin
- Referee: Alois Pennig (Mannheim)
- Attendance: 60,000

The 1940 Tschammerpokal final decided the winner of the 1940 Tschammerpokal, the 6th season of Germany's knockout football cup competition. It was played on 1 December 1940 at the Olympiastadion in Berlin. Dresdner SC won the match 2–1 against 1. FC Nürnberg after extra time, to claim their 1st cup title.

== Route to the final ==
The Tschammerpokal began the final stage with 64 teams in a single-elimination knockout cup competition. There were a total of five rounds leading up to the final. Teams were drawn against each other, and the winner after 90 minutes would advance. If still tied, 30 minutes of extra time was played. If the score was still level, a replay would take place at the original away team's stadium. If still level after 90 minutes, 30 minutes of extra time was played. If the score was still level, a second replay would take place at the original home team's stadium. If still level after 90 minutes, 30 minutes of extra time was played. If the score was still level, a drawing of lots would decide who would advance to the next round.

Note: In all results below, the score of the finalist is given first (H: home; A: away).

1. FC Nürnberg		Round	Dresdner SC
Opponent	Result	1940 Tschammerpokal	Opponent	Result
Sturm Graz (A)	6–1	Round 1	NSTG Graslitz (A)	4–0
Kickers Offenbach (H)	3–2	Round 2	Blumenthaler SV (H)	5–0
Union Oberschöneweide (A)	1–0	Round of 16	Reichsbahn TuSV Frankfurt (H)	6–0
Schwarz-Weiß Essen (H)	2–1	Quarter-finals	VfB Königsberg (A)	8–0
Fortuna Düsseldorf (A)	1–0	Semi-finals	Rapid Wien (H)	3–0

== Match ==
=== Details ===
1 December 1940

1. FC Nürnberg	1–2 (a.e.t.)	Dresdner SC
Gußner 32'	Report	Machate 20'; Schaffner 94'

Olympiastadion, Berlin
Attendance: 60,000
Referee: Alois Pennig (Mannheim)

1. FC Nürnberg	Dresdner SC

GK	1	(Germany) Georg Köhl
RB		(Germany) Willi Billmann (c)
LB		(Germany) Hans Übelein
RH		(Germany) Georg Luber
CH		(Germany) Georg Kennemann
LH		(Germany) Heinz Carolin
OR		(Germany) Karl Gußner
IR		(Germany) Max Eiberger
CF		(Germany) Georg Friedel
IL		(Germany) Alfred Pfänder
OL		(Germany) Willi Kund
Manager:
(Germany) Alwin Riemke

GK	1	(Germany) Willibald Kreß
RB		(Germany) Karl Miller
LB		(Germany) Heinz Hempel (c)
RH		(Germany) Herbert Pohl
CH		(Germany) Walter Dzur
LH		(Germany) Helmut Schubert
OR		(Germany) Emanuel Boczek
IR		(Germany) Heinz Schaffer
CF		(Germany) Fritz Machate
IL		(Germany) Helmut Schön
OL		(Germany) Gustav Carstens
Manager:
(Germany) Georg Köhler

Match rules

- 90 minutes.
- 30 minutes of extra time if necessary.
- Replay if scores still level.
- No substitutions.
