= 1940 German football championship =

1940 German championship
Deutsche Fußballmeisterschaft
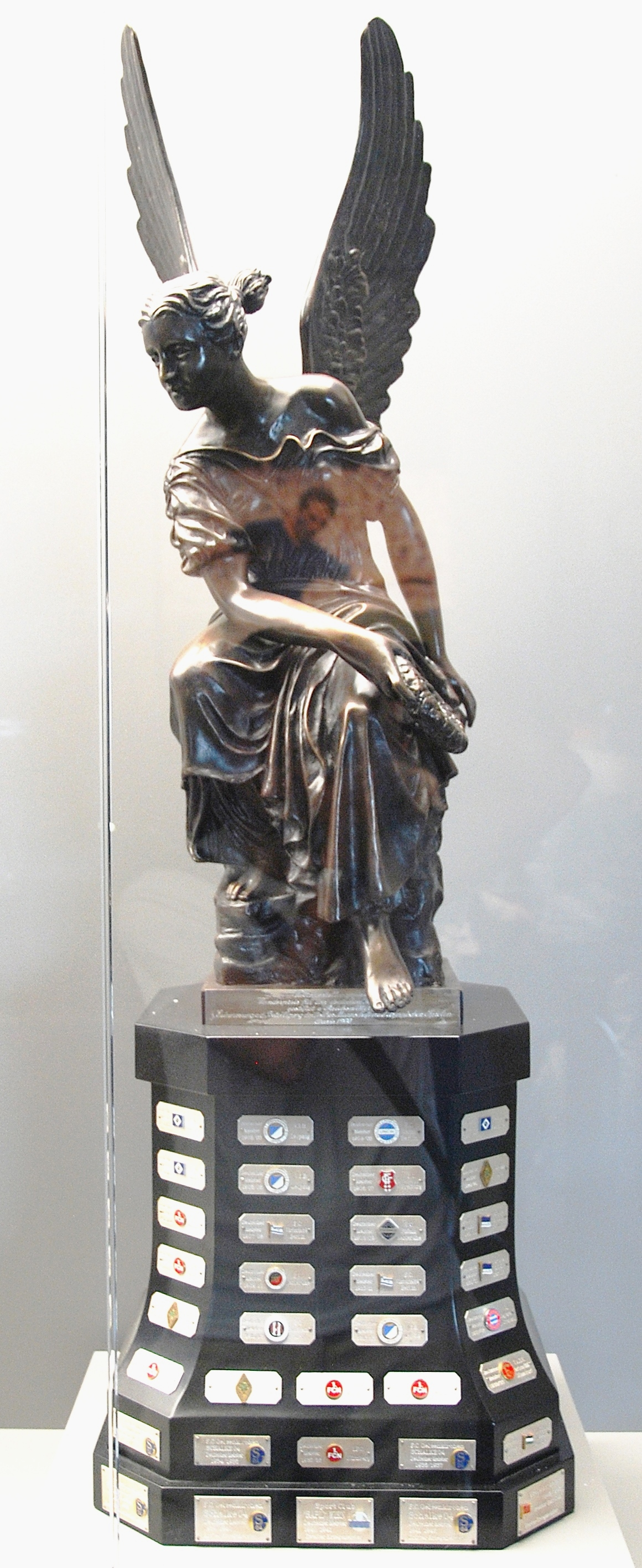
- Replica of the Viktoria trophy

Tournament details
- Country: Germany
- Dates: 21 April – 28 July
- Teams: 18

Final positions
- Champions: Schalke 04; 5th German title
- Runners-up: Dresdner SC
- Third place: Rapid Wien
- Fourth place: Waldhof Mannheim

Tournament statistics
- Matches played: 55
- Goals scored: 253 (4.6 per match)
- Top goal scorer: Franz Binder (14 goals)

The 1940 German football championship, the 33rd edition of the competition, was won by Schalke 04, the club's fifth German championship, by defeating Dresdner SC 1–0 in the final. Both clubs would continue to be strong sides during the Second World War editions of the German championship with Schalke making a losing appearance in the 1941 final before winning again in 1942 while Dresden was crowned German champions in 1943 and 1944.

Schalke's 16–0 win over CSC 03 Kassel in the group stages was the highest win in the history of the German championship as well as the most goals scored in a game.

Rapid Wien's Franz Binder became the 1940 championships top scorer with 14 goals, a new record that would be broken the following year by Schalke's Hermann Eppenhoff when he scored 15 goals.

The eighteen 1939–40 Gauliga champions, the same number as in 1939, competed in a group stage with the four group winners advancing to the semi-finals. The two semi-final winners then contested the 1940 championship final. The groups were divided into three with four clubs and one with six clubs with the latter, in turn, subdivided into two groups of three teams each and a final of these group winners to determine the overall group champions.

In the following season, the German championship was played with twenty clubs. From there it gradually expanded further through a combination of territorial expansion of Nazi Germany and the sub-dividing of the Gauligas in later years, reaching a strength of thirty-one in its last completed season, 1943–44.

== Qualified teams ==
The teams qualified through the 1939–40 Gauliga season:

Club	Qualified from
SV Waldhof Mannheim	Gauliga Baden
1. FC Nürnberg	Gauliga Bayern
Union Oberschöneweide	Gauliga Berlin-Brandenburg
CSC 03 Kassel	Gauliga Hessen
SV Jena	Gauliga Mitte
Mülheimer SV	Gauliga Mittelrhein
Fortuna Düsseldorf	Gauliga Niederrhein
VfL Osnabrück	Gauliga Niedersachsen
Eimsbütteler TV	Gauliga Nordmark
SK Rapid Wien	Gauliga Ostmark
VfB Königsberg	Gauliga Ostpreußen
VfL Stettin	Gauliga Pommern
Dresdner SC	Gauliga Sachsen
Vorwärts-Rasensport Gleiwitz	Gauliga Schlesien
NSTG Graslitz	Gauliga Sudetenland
Kickers Offenbach	Gauliga Südwest
Schalke 04	Gauliga Westfalen
Stuttgarter Kickers	Gauliga Württemberg

== Competition ==
=== Group 1 ===
==== Group 1A ====
Group 1A was contested by the champions of the Gauligas Brandenburg, Ostpreußen and Pommern:

Pos	Team	Pld	W	D	L	GF	GA	GR	Pts	Qualification	OBE	KON	STE
1	Union Oberschöneweide	4	3	0	1	13	8	1.625	6	Advance to group final	—	6–3	3–1
2	VfB Königsberg	4	3	0	1	13	10	1.300	6		3–1	—	5–2
3	VfL Stettin	4	0	0	4	5	13	0.385	0		1–3	1–2	—

Source: RSSSF
Rules for classification: 1) Points; 2) Goal ratio.

==== Group 1B ====
Group 1B was contested by the champions of the Gauligas Ostmark, Schlesien and Sudetenland:

Pos	Team	Pld	W	D	L	GF	GA	GR	Pts	Qualification	RWI	VRG	GRA
1	Rapid Wien	4	3	1	0	19	4	4.750	7	Advance to group final	—	3–1	7–0
2	Vorwärts-Rasensport Gleiwitz	4	1	2	1	11	11	1.000	4		2–2	—	4–2
3	NSTG Graslitz	4	0	1	3	7	22	0.318	1		1–7	4–4	—

Source: RSSSF
Rules for classification: 1) Points; 2) Goal ratio.

==== Group 1 final ====
Team 1	Agg.	Team 2	1st leg	2nd leg
Rapid Wien	6–3	Union Oberschöneweide	3–1	3–2

=== Group 2 ===
Group 2 was contested by the champions of the Gauligas Mitte, Niedersachsen, Nordmark and Sachsen:

Pos	Team	Pld	W	D	L	GF	GA	GR	Pts	Qualification	DRE	ETV	OSN	SVJ
1	Dresdner SC	6	4	2	0	9	0	—	10	Advance to semi-finals	—	0–0	3–0	1–0
2	Eimsbütteler TV	6	3	1	2	10	10	1.000	7		0–3	—	3–1	0–1
3	VfL Osnabrück	6	1	2	3	11	14	0.786	4		0–0	3–4	—	5–2
4	1. SV Jena	6	1	1	4	7	13	0.538	3		0–2	2–3	2–2	—

Source: RSSSF
Rules for classification: 1) Points; 2) Goal ratio.

=== Group 3 ===
Group 3 was contested by the champions of the Gauligas Hessen, Mittelrhein, Niederrhein and Westfalen:

Pos	Team	Pld	W	D	L	GF	GA	GR	Pts	Qualification	S04	F95	MUS	CSC
1	Schalke 04	6	4	2	0	35	5	7.000	10	Advance to semi-finals	—	0–0	5–0	16–0
2	Fortuna Düsseldorf	6	3	2	1	21	4	5.250	8		1–1	—	7–1	7–0
3	Mülheimer SV	6	2	0	4	14	29	0.483	4		2–8	2–1	—	4–5
4	CSC Kassel	6	1	0	5	10	42	0.238	2		2–5	0–5	3–5	—

Source: RSSSF
Rules for classification: 1) Points; 2) Goal ratio.

=== Group 4 ===
Group 4 was contested by the champions of the Gauligas Bayern, Baden, Südwest and Württemberg:

Pos	Team	Pld	W	D	L	GF	GA	GR	Pts	Qualification	WMA	FCN	SKI	KOF
1	Waldhof Mannheim	6	3	2	1	14	5	2.800	8	Advance to semi-finals	—	1–1	7–2	4–0
2	1. FC Nürnberg	6	2	2	2	10	4	2.500	6		0–0	—	1–0	8–0
3	Stuttgarter Kickers	6	3	0	3	9	9	1.000	6		1–0	2–0	—	4–0
4	Kickers Offenbach	6	2	0	4	3	18	0.167	4		1–2	1–0	1–0	—

Source: RSSSF
Rules for classification: 1) Points; 2) Goal ratio.

=== Semi-finals ===
Two of the four clubs in the 1940 semi-finals had reached the same stage in the previous season, Dresdner SC and FC Schalke 04, while Rapid Wien replaced Admira Wien and SV Waldhof Mannheim Hamburger SV in comparison to 1939:

Team 1	Score	Team 2
14 July 1940
Schalke 04	3–1	SV Waldhof Mannheim
SK Rapid Wien	1–2 aet	Dresdner SC

=== Third place play-off ===
Team 1	Score	Team 2
21 July 1940
SK Rapid Wien	4–4 aet	SV Waldhof Mannheim

==== Replay ====
Team 1	Score	Team 2
28 July 1940
SK Rapid Wien	5–2	SV Waldhof Mannheim

=== Final ===
21 July 1940

Schalke 04	1–0	Dresdner SC
Kalwitzki 27'	Report

Olympic Stadium (Berlin)
Attendance: 95,000
Referee: G. Stark (Munich)

FC SCHALKE 04:
GK	(Nazi Germany) Hans Klodt
RB	(Nazi Germany) Hans Bornemann
CB	(Nazi Germany) Otto Tibulski
LB	(Nazi Germany) Heinz Hinz
RH	(Nazi Germany) Bernhard Füller
LH	(Nazi Germany) Herbert Burdenski
IR	(Nazi Germany) Fritz Szepan
IL	(Nazi Germany) Ernst Kuzorra (c)
OR	(Nazi Germany) Hermann Eppenhoff
CF	(Nazi Germany) Ernst Kalwitzki
OL	(Nazi Germany) Willi Schuh
Manager:
(Nazi Germany) Otto Faist

DRESDNER SC 1898:
GK	(Nazi Germany) Willibald Kreß
RB	(Nazi Germany) Herbert Pohl
CB	(Nazi Germany) Walter Dzur
LB	(Nazi Germany) Heinz Hempel
RH	(Nazi Germany) Werner Strauch
LH	(Nazi Germany) Helmut Schubert
IR	(Protectorate of Bohemia and Moravia) Heinrich Schaffer
IL	(Nazi Germany) Richard Hofmann (c)
OR	(Nazi Germany) Emanuel Boczek
CF	(Nazi Germany) Helmut Schön
OL	(Nazi Germany) Heinz Köpping
Manager:
(Nazi Germany) Georg Köhler
