= 1939–40 Gauliga =

Gauliga
- Season: 1939–40
- Champions: 18 regional winners
- German champions: Schalke 04; 5th German title

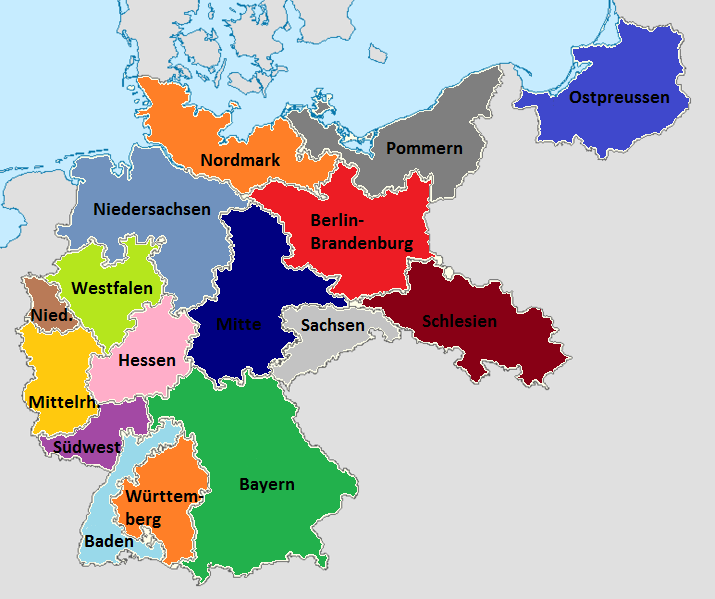
The initial 16 districts of the Gauliga from 1933 to 1938

The 1939–40 Gauliga was the seventh season of the Gauliga, the first tier of the football league system in Germany from 1933 to 1945. It was the first season held during the Second World War.

The league operated in eighteen regional divisions with the league containing 216 clubs all up, 41 more than the previous season. The majority of Gauligas were regionally sub-divided during the season, with finals or final rounds played to determine the champions. The league champions entered the 1940 German football championship, won by FC Schalke 04 who defeated Dresdner SC 1–0 in the final. It was Schalke's fifth national championship, with the club winning six championships all up during the Gauliga era.

The 1939–40 season saw the sixth edition of the Tschammerpokal, now the DFB-Pokal. The 1940 edition was won by Dresdner SC, defeating 1. FC Nürnberg 2–1 on 1 December 1940.

The number of Gauligas, eighteen, remained unchanged compare to the previous season which had seen the addition of the Gauliga Ostmark and Gauliga Sudetenland to the original sixteen.

In the part of Czechoslovakia incorporated into Germany in March 1939, the Protectorate of Bohemia and Moravia, a separate Czech league continued to exist which was not part of the Gauliga system or the German championship. In Poland the German invasion in September 1939 caused the Polish league to stop play near the end of the 1939 season and, unlike in Bohemia and Moravia, the league would not resume till after the war. Eventually, in 1941, the Gauliga Wartheland, covering the Reichsgau Wartheland, and the Gauliga Generalgouvernement, covering the General Government, were created in the areas annexed by Nazi Germany and in occupied Poland put these leagues were only for ethnic German clubs and not open to Polish teams.

== Champions ==
Map of Nazi Germany showing its expansion 1938 -1945

The 1939–40 Gauliga champions qualified for the group stage of the German championship. SK Rapid Wien, SV Waldhof Mannheim, Dresdner SC and FC Schalke 04 won their championship groups and advanced to the semi-finals with the latter two reaching the championship final which Schalke won.

FC Schalke 04 won their seventh consecutive Gauliga title, Fortuna Düsseldorf won their fifth consecutive one, Vorwärts-Rasensport Gleiwitz their third consecutive title while Stuttgarter Kickers, Dresdner SC, CSC 03 Kassel and VfL Osnabrück defended their 1938–39 Gauliga title.

| Club | League | No. of clubs |
| SV Waldhof Mannheim | Gauliga Baden | 25 |
| 1. FC Nürnberg | Gauliga Bayern (1939–40 season) | 10 |
| Union Oberschöneweide | Gauliga Berlin-Brandenburg | 12 |
| CSC 03 Kassel | Gauliga Hessen | 12 |
| SV Jena | Gauliga Mitte | 8 |
| Mülheimer SV | Gauliga Mittelrhein | 13 |
| Fortuna Düsseldorf | Gauliga Niederrhein | 10 |
| VfL Osnabrück | Gauliga Niedersachsen | 12 |
| Eimsbütteler TV | Gauliga Nordmark | 13 |
| SK Rapid Wien | Gauliga Ostmark (1939–40 season) | 8 |
| VfB Königsberg | Gauliga Ostpreußen | 8 |
| VfL Stettin | Gauliga Pommern | 11 |
| Dresdner SC | Gauliga Sachsen | 12 |
| Vorwärts-Rasensport Gleiwitz | Gauliga Schlesien | 14 |
| NSTG Graslitz | Gauliga Sudetenland | 12 |
| Kickers Offenbach | Gauliga Südwest | 14 |
| FC Schalke 04 | Gauliga Westfalen | 10 |
| Stuttgarter Kickers | Gauliga Württemberg | 12 |
