= Rüdiger Mielke =

German footballer

Personal information
- Date of birth: 4 September 1944
- Date of death: 18 December 2021 (aged 77)
- Position: Striker

Senior career*
| Years | Team | Apps | (Gls) |
| 1965–1967 | Meidericher SV/ MSV Duisburg | 15 | (15) |
- * Club domestic league appearances and goals

Rüdiger Mielke (4 September 1944 – 18 December 2021) was a German football player. His career for Meidericher SV (in 1967 renamed as MSV Duisburg) ended due to injury. He scored 15 goals in 15 Bundesliga matches.

== Career ==
Mielke made both part of the youth and the second team of Meidericher SV before becoming part of the first team in 1965. On 10 April 1965 he debuted in Bundesliga against 1. FC Nürnberg and directly scored his first goal. At the beginning of the following season 1965-66 he missed the first matches under the direction of the new coach Hermann Eppenhoff and then made only occasionally part of the team. On 26 March 1966 he scored four goals during an away match against SC Tasmania 1900 Berlin. Meiderich won this match by 9-0 which meant the highest away victory in the history of Bundesliga. Mielke was not only the most important goal scorer during this match but also during the season 1965-66. He scored 14 goals and thereby passed national team player Werner Krämer (13 goals) although he only took part in 13 of 34 matches. Along with an eighth rank in Bundesliga Meidericher SV achieved the qualification for the 1966 cup final. He had already scored two goals in previous cup matches and was able to shoot the first goal for Meiderich against FC Bayern München but then lost by 2-4 with his team. Even though the match was lost, national coach Helmut Schön invited 21-year-old Mielke to take part in a national team training course.

He suffered a serious knee injury in the summer of 1966, had to stop playing for several months and was not able to reintegrate the team of Meidericher SV/MSV Duisburg during the rest of the season 1966-67. His professional career definitely ended in 1967 after 15 Bundesliga matches with already 15 goals, the highest away victory ever in Bundesliga, a participation in a cup final and an invitation of the national coach. Mielke became part of the team of Verbandsliga Westfalen 2 (third division) club SG Wattenscheid 09 for some time and then focused on his non-sport professional career.
