= Dresden English Football Club =

Coordinates: 51°02′25″N 13°44′52″E

Dresden English FC
- Full name: Dresden English Football Club
- Founded: 18 March 1874
- Dissolved: 30 April 1898; 128 years ago
- Ground: Güntzwiesen, Dresden
- Capacity: 5,000
- Chairman: Rev. Bowden
Home colours

The Dresden English Football Club was a football club founded in 1874 in Dresden, the first in Germany and likely the first outside Great Britain.

== History ==
=== Initial foundation ===
The Dresden English Football Club was founded in 1874 and was the first football club in Germany, probably the first in continental Europe. That year, over 70 members participated, primarily Englishmen working in Dresden, watched by hundreds of spectators. They played on a meadow at the Güntzwiesen, near the Blüherpark and the site of today's Glücksgas Stadium.

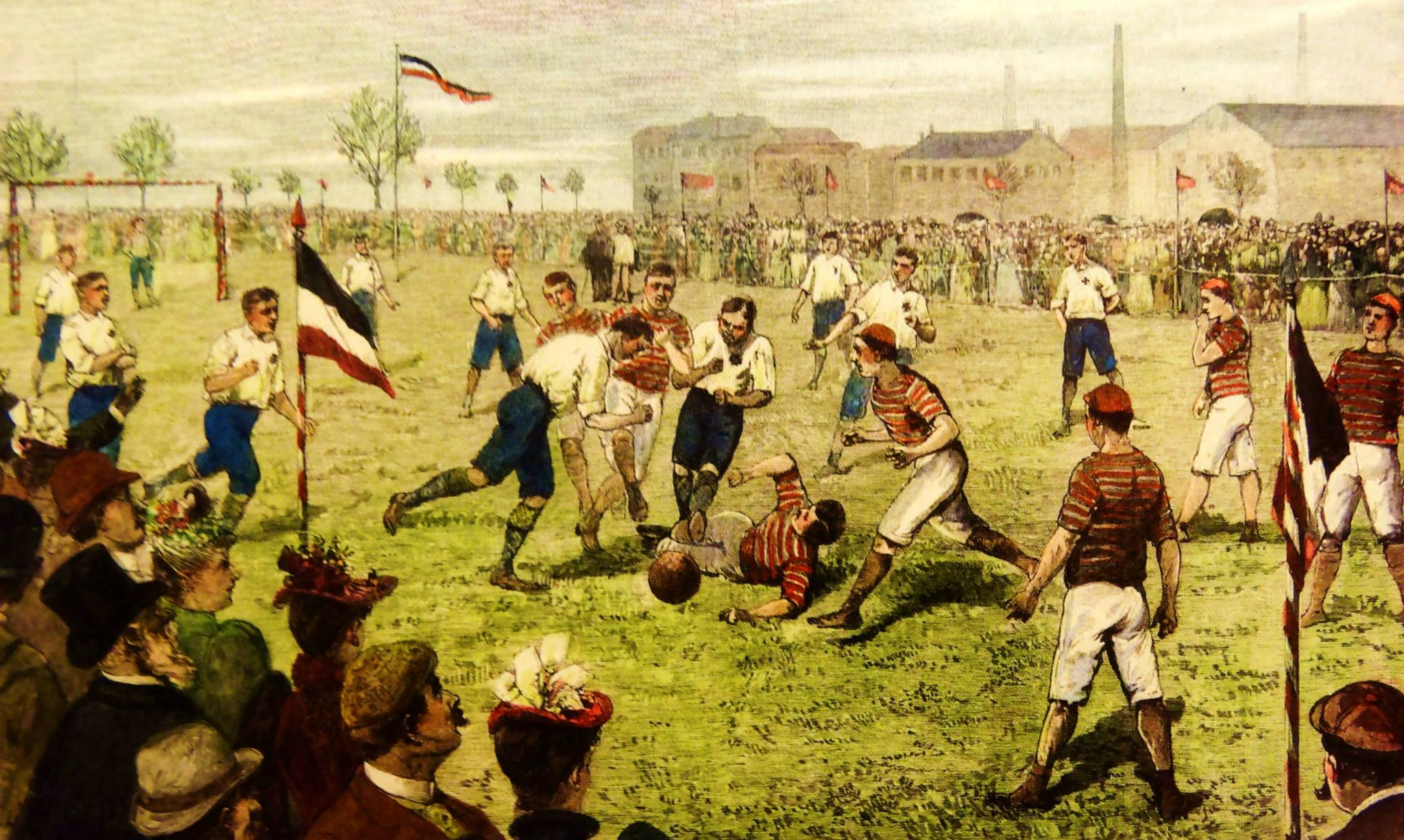
Illustration of a Dresden FC (white shirts) vs Deutscher Fußballbund, 1883

In April 1874, the Illustrirte Zeitung [sic] of Leipzig reported on the establishment of an association "calling itself Dresden Football Club (D.F.C.)" to play a game "in which the ball is propelled forward with the foot", and described: "some twenty young men in a costume, namely in different colours to distinguish them. A kind of woollen or silk underjacket, with or without sleeves, short-fitting leg coverings that show the bare knee, long stockings, [and] very comfortable shoes or lace-up boots make up the ensemble."

Between 1891 and 1894, seven matches are documented, the first six of which the Dresden team won; as a Vienna sports paper reported, they had not even allowed a goal to be scored against them. Their goal ratio was 34:0. In a match played on New Year's Day 1891, they defeated the English F.C. of Berlin 7:0; according to an account published in 1898 by the founding vice-president of the German Football Association, Philipp Heineken, the Berliners described their play as nonplusultra. On 18 April 1892 at Berlin, in the presence of representatives of the Ministry of Culture and of the British ambassador, they won 3:0 against a representative city team; this was presumably the Deutscher Fußball- und Cricketbund, which had the status of an early national German team. Their first defeat, on 10 March 1894, was a 2:0 loss to another Berlin team, Tor und Fußball Club Victoria 89, with both goals scored in the first ten minutes.

Players in 1894 were: Beb (Captain), Burchard, Crossley, Graham, Atkins, Spencer, Ravenscraft, Johnson, le Maistre, Luxmoore, Young. The president of the club was Rev. Bowden.

=== Refoundation ===
On 30 April 1898, former members of the Dresden English Football Club and of the Neue Dresdner FC (founded in 1893 by former DEFC members and now SpVgg Dresden-Löbtau 1893) founded the Dresdner Sport-Club. Until sports historian Andreas Wittner uncovered the earlier history of the DFC, it was thought to have been founded only in 1890.

== See also ==
- Oldest football clubs
- Cambridge rules
