= Arno Neumann =

German footballer

Personal information
- Date of birth: 7 February 1885
- Place of birth: Dresden, German Empire
- Date of death: 6 March 1966
- Place of death: Radebeul, East Germany
- Position: Forward

Senior career*
Years	Team	Apps	(Gls)
- Dresdner SC

International career
1908	Germany	1	(0)
- * Club domestic league appearances and goals

Arno Neumann (7 February 1885 - 7 March 1966) was a German international footballer.
