= Friedrich Müller (footballer) =

German footballer

Personal information
- Date of birth: 7 February 1907
- Date of death: 15 May 1978 (aged 71)
- Position: Forward

Senior career*
Years	Team	Apps	(Gls)
- Dresdner SC

International career
1931	Germany	2	(0)
- * Club domestic league appearances and goals

Friedrich Müller (7 February 1907 – 15 May 1978) was a German international footballer in 1931.
