= Karl Schlösser =

German footballer

Personal information
- Date of birth: 29 January 1912
- Date of death: 1982
- Position: Forward

Senior career*
Years	Team	Apps	(Gls)
- Dresdner SC

International career
1931	Germany	1	(1)
- * Club domestic league appearances and goals

Karl Schlösser (29 January 1912 – 1982) was a German international footballer. He appeared in 11 German football championship matches for Dresdner SC between 1930 and 1934 and appeared in one match for the Germany national football team, scoring Germany's only goal in a 1–1 draw against the Netherlands.
