= Germany national football team manager =

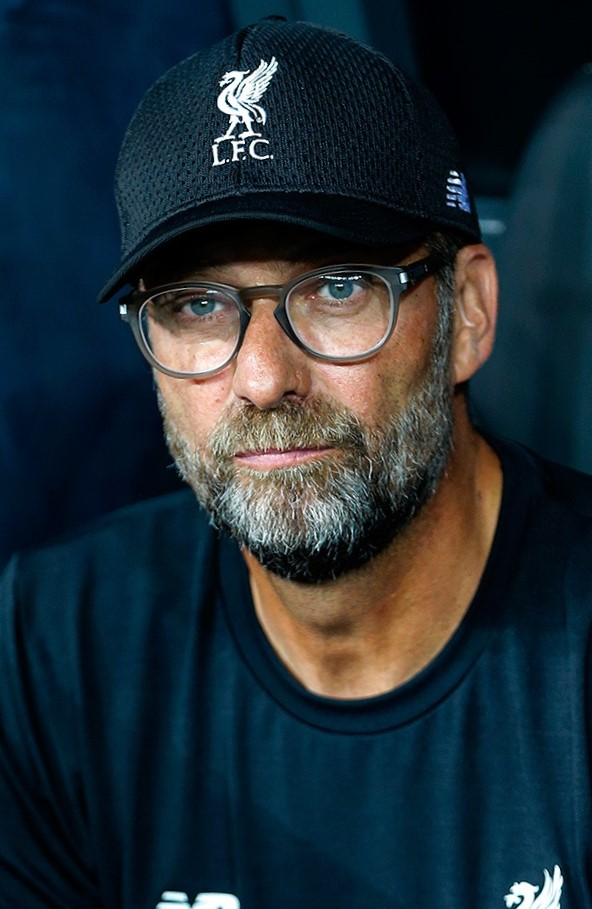
Jürgen Klopp, the current head coach of the Germany national team

The Germany national football team manager (German: Bundestrainer, lit. 'Federal Coach' or lit. 'Association Coach') is a position created in 1926 and first held by Otto Nerz. The German team began playing matches in 1908, but for 18 years it had no manager. Instead a selection committee chose the team.

Twelve men have occupied the post since its inception, all of whom are German. Seven of the twelve have previously played for the national team, the exceptions being Nerz, Erich Ribbeck, Joachim Löw, Hansi Flick, and Julian Nagelsmann. Many of the managers previously served as assistant to their predecessor; each of the three managers after Nerz had worked under the previous incumbent, Löw was assistant to Jürgen Klinsmann from 2004 to 2006, and Hansi Flick was assistant to Löw from 2006 to 2014.

From 1936 to 1998, the team had just five managers, each of whom won a major trophy, with Helmut Schön (1964–1978) winning two. A span of sixteen years (1990–2006) has seen just four people in the role.

The title Bundestrainer has been in use since 1950 – prior to 1942 the role was titled Reichstrainer (lit. 'Reich Coach'). Franz Beckenbauer and Rudi Völler could not be titled Bundestrainer, due to a lack of coaching qualifications, so were titled Teamchef (lit. 'Team Leader'). Their assistants, Horst Köppel/Holger Osieck and Michael Skibbe respectively, were the official Bundestrainer during this time.

The coach of the women's team is called Bundestrainer, too, or denoted with the female form Bundestrainerin.

The German national team is the only national team in which four national coaches (Herberger, Schön, Vogts, and Löw) have sat in more than 100 international matches and, with only twelve national coaches (the first six over a 74-year period), has had significantly fewer coaches than other national teams.

== History ==
=== Early years ===
For the first twenty years of its existence, the team had no manager, with the team being picked by a selection committee of the German Football Association, before Otto Nerz was appointed as head coach in 1926. Nerz had a disciplinarian style and achieved respectable results with a hitherto unsuccessful team – reaching third place at the 1934 World Cup. He was unable to fulfil the Nazi Party's high expectations at the 1936 Olympic Games (hosted in Berlin), however, and was replaced by his assistant, Sepp Herberger after the team was eliminated by outsiders Norway.

Herberger was forced to coach a new "greater Germany" team (including the now-annexed Austria) which meant that he had to involve players from the newly defunct Austrian team. The highly favourited German side, now weakened by the unfamiliar Austrian additions, was immediately knocked out by Switzerland in the first round of the 1938 World Cup, Germany's worst World Cup performance to date. Eventual success from the team was prevented by World War II, and subsequent sanctions against Germany, banning them from international football.

=== Post-war ===
The national team was inactive from 1942 to 1950, resuming as West Germany once the ban was lifted. Herberger led the team through qualification for the 1954 World Cup, which they won in surprise fashion, beating Hungary in the final. The win is credited with playing a large part in the nation's psychological and economic recovery after World War II. West Germany managed creditable results at the 1958 and 1962 World Cups, before Herberger retired in 1964, 28 years after first taking the job. He was succeeded by his assistant, Helmut Schön.

=== Glory years ===
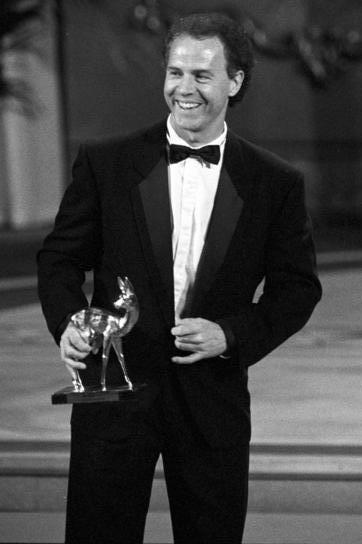
Franz Beckenbauer, manager from 1984 to 1990

Schön, who had managed the short-lived Saarland national team from 1952 to 1956, began to establish West Germany as a consistent force in world football. He took the team to the 1966 World Cup final, and despite failing to qualify in West Germany's first entry to the European Championship in 1968, he achieved a third-place finish 1970 World Cup in Mexico. Then came the team's greatest successes – a first European Championship title was won in 1972, which was followed by the 1974 World Cup, where West Germany, as hosts, ran out tournament winners, beating the Netherlands in the final. Schön is one of only two coaches to win both the World Cup and European Championship, the other being Spain's Vicente del Bosque. In 1976, West Germany came within a penalty shoot-out of defending their European crown, losing against Czechoslovakia in the final. Before the 1978 World Cup, Schön announced that this was to be his last tournament, but was unable to go out on a high note, as the team was eliminated by neighbours Austria in Round 2. He retired having managed 25 World Cup games and won 16, both tournament records which remain to this day.

Schön was succeeded by his assistant, Jupp Derwall. Derwall's tenure began successfully. The team won a second European Championship in 1980, and reached the Final of the 1982 World Cup, However, he was sacked after West Germany were eliminated in the first round of the 1984 European Championship.

Derwall was replaced by Franz Beckenbauer, who had made 103 appearances for the national team, and was captain of the successful side of the early 1970s. This appointment ended the run of promoting assistants – Beckenbauer had not previously been part of the DFB coaching setup, and had no previous managerial experience. He led the team to a second consecutive World Cup Final in 1986, before reaching the semi-final of the 1988 European Championship, a tournament which West Germany hosted. the 1990 World Cup was to be his last tournament, but he ended on a high, winning the tournament for the third time, and becoming the only man to lift the trophy as a captain and as coach. He stood down immediately afterwards, to be replaced by Berti Vogts, a former national squad team-mate who had served on the coaching staff of the DFB.

=== Reunification and decline ===
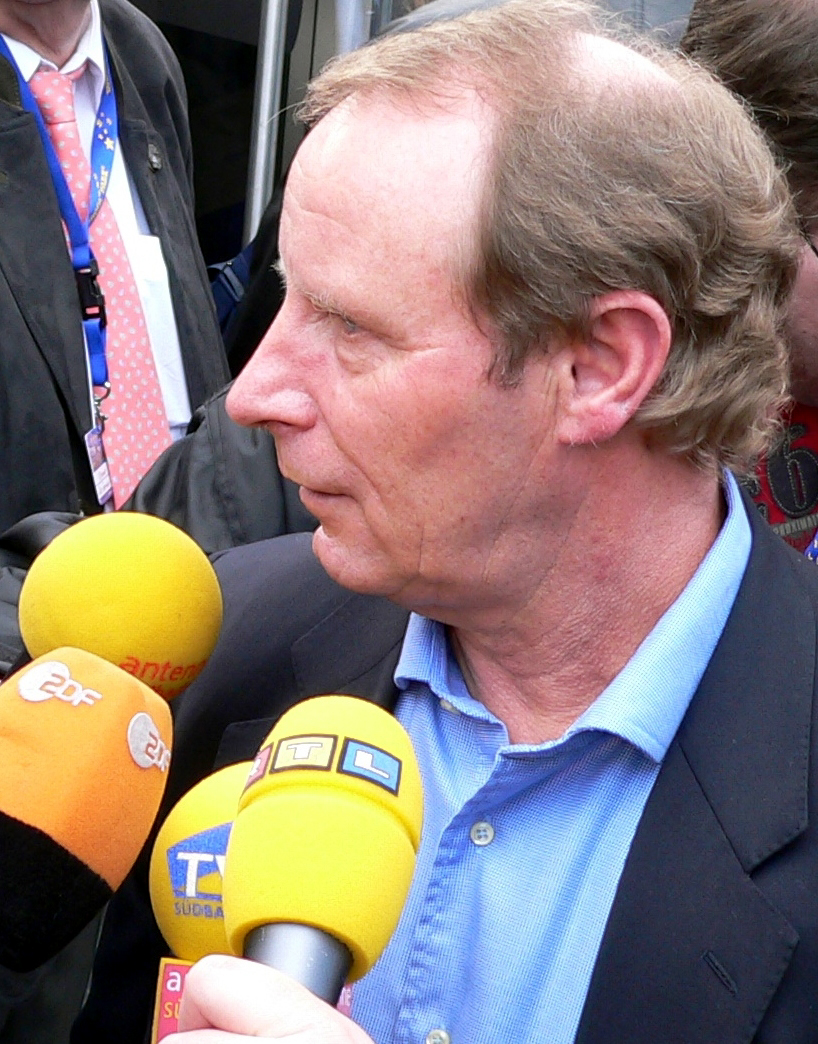
Berti Vogts, manager from 1990 to 1998

Vogts took on a now-reunified Germany, and led the team, including players from the former East Germany, to the final of Euro 1992, only to lose against underdogs Denmark. Germany were eliminated from the 1994 World Cup in similarly dramatic fashion, losing against Bulgaria in the quarter-finals. Vogts' greatest achievement was the 1996 European Championship, which Germany won, beating the Czech Republic in the final, thanks to a golden goal from Oliver Bierhoff. However, the 1998 World Cup proved unsuccessful, with an ageing German team knocked out by Croatia in the quarter-final. Vogts resigned shortly afterwards.

The DFB announced that Paul Breitner, another player from the 1970s team, would be Vogts' replacement, only to go back on this decision after just 17 hours. Eventually a manager was appointed: Erich Ribbeck, who had managed several top German clubs, and had been assistant to Jupp Derwall, but was now 61, and in semi-retirement. The talent pool in Germany at this time was poor, with few young players emerging, and Ribbeck oversaw a disastrous Euro 2000 campaign, with Germany eliminated in the first round, with just one point from their three group games. This led to Ribbeck's immediate resignation.

=== Rebuilding and success ===
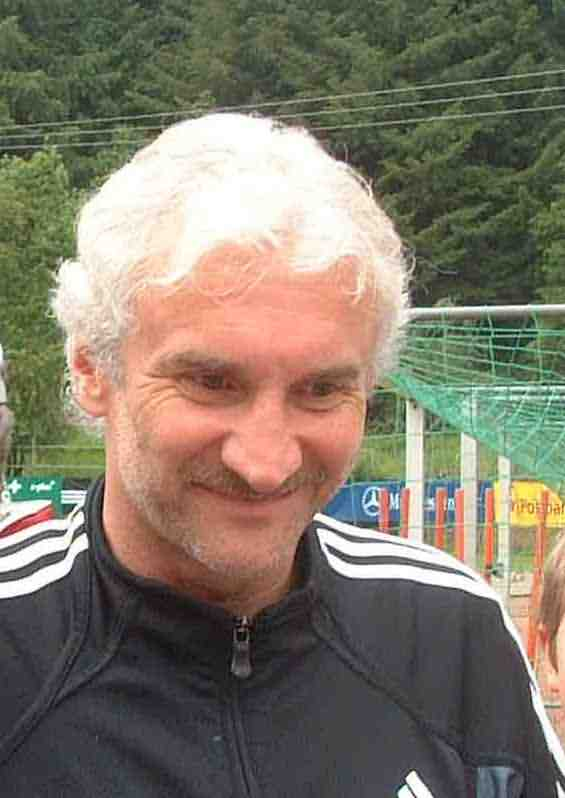
Rudi Völler, manager from 2000 to 2004

The next man to take charge of the team was Rudi Völler, who had been part of the 1990 World Cup-winning team, but had no coaching experience. He was intended to be an interim appointment, standing in for a year while the intended appointee, Christoph Daum, served out his contract at Bayer Leverkusen. However, Daum failed a drugs test, testing positive for cocaine, and Völler was given the job permanently. After a tricky qualifying campaign, Völler led the team to the final of the 2002 World Cup, a result that was unexpected given the perceived lack of quality in the squad. Euro 2004 was less successful, though, with Germany eliminated in the first-round, having failed to win a match for a second successive European Championship, including being held to a 0–0 draw by Latvia.

Völler then resigned from the job, and with Germany due to host the next World Cup, they once again opted for an inexperienced manager, Völler's old strike partner Jürgen Klinsmann. Klinsmann attempted to introduce a new playing style to the team, based on young players, and an attack-minded mentality. Germany achieved third place at the 2006 World Cup, after a dramatic semi-final defeat to Italy. Klinsmann stood down afterwards, despite being offered a renewed contract.

Klinsmann was succeeded by his assistant, Joachim Löw, who continued in much the same manner as his predecessor. After comfortably qualifying for Euro 2008, the team reached the final, losing 1–0 to Spain. Löw continued in the role and qualified for the 2010 World Cup, in which the Team lost the semi-final 1–0 against Spain after overwhelming victories against Argentina (4–0) and England (4–1). They finished in third place for the second FIFA World Cup running, after beating Uruguay 3–2. Still under the management of Löw, Germany qualified top of Group A in qualification for UEFA Euro 2012 with a record of 10 wins out of ten matches against Kazakhstan, Turkey, Austria, Belgium, and Azerbaijan. Germany was placed along with Portugal, Netherlands, and Denmark, thus making it the group of death. As the only team to have won all three group matches, Germany went on to defeat Greece in the quarter-final and set a historic record in international football of 15 consecutive wins in all competitive matches. In the semi-final match against Italy, despite high expectations, Germany was unable to break the record to defeat Italy in any competitive matches. At the 2014 FIFA World Cup, they were pitted alongside Portugal (4–0), Ghana (2–2) and the United States (1–0) in Group G. They reached the final, for a record eighth time and after twelve years, since 2002, after eliminating Algeria (2–1 after extra time), France (1–0) and a historic win against Brazil (7–1) in the knockout stage. In the final, Germany defeated Argentina with 1–0 in extra time, winning their fourth title, the first since 1990. In 2021, Löw announced his retirement as manager of the team after UEFA Euro 2020. This followed Germany's poor performances in the 2018 World Cup, where they exited the tournament in the first round for the first time since 1938, as well as in the 2018–19 UEFA Nations League.

== Statistical summary ==
Statistics are correct as of 16 November 2026

Name (italic=assistant (Note: Team chiefs (Beckenbauer and Völler) also had the necessary coaching license.))	from (Note: In terms of office, the date of the first and the last international match is specified.)	to	Days	P	W	D^{(Note: Includes matches won or lost on penalty shoot-outs.)}	L	GF	GA	G/dif.	Win %	Pts.	newcomers	Tournaments	
DFB committee	5 Apr 1908	5 Apr 1914	2191	30	6	5	19	72	96	-24	20.00	23		None	
no national team matches and no national coaches between 1914 and 1920
DFB committee	27 Jun 1920	20 Jun 1926	4446	28	10	7	11	47	50	-3	35.71	37		None	
DFB committee (total)	5 Apr 1908	20 Jun 1926	6637	58	16	12	30	119	146	-27	27.59	60	194	-	
Otto Nerz † (Reichs trainer); Sepp Herberger † (1932–1936); Ferdinand Fabra † (1935–1936)	31 Oct 1926 (Note: Otto Nerz was employed from 1 July 1926 as a "part-time" coach, whose activity was initially limited to "move" the players determined by the football committee. The lineup continued to determine the officials. Gradually, he received more skills. Therefore, the beginning of his responsibility is documented differently.)	17 Oct 1936 (Note: Since 2019, the DFB expects five international matches from September and October 1936, which were earlier than the first games under Sepp Herberger, whose predecessor Otto Nerz. In the first of these five games Otto Nerz was forced to leave Germany due to athletic failure and was represented by Herberger, the next two games took place on the same day at different locations with different teams, each with a selection of mink and one of Herberger looked after. Herberger was only officially appointed coach on 2 November 1936, which is why, according to revised DFB statistics, only the international match of 15 November 1936 against Italy as his debut in the office of the Reich coach.)	3640	75	44	11	20	204	124	+80	61.11	143	137	World Cup 1930	DNE
Otto Nerz † (Reichs trainer); Sepp Herberger † (1932–1936); Ferdinand Fabra † (1935–1936)	31 Oct 1926	17 Oct 1936	3640	75	44	11	20	204	124	+80	61.11	143	137	World Cup 1934	Third
Sepp Herberger † (Reichs trainer); Emil Melcher † (1936–1942)	15 Nov 1936	22 Nov 1942	2199	65	40	12	13	204	93	+111	61.54	132	82	World Cup 1938	Group Stage
no national team matches and no national coaches between 1942 and 1950
Sepp Herberger † (Bundestrainer); Hennes Weisweiler † (1954–1955); Georg Gawliczek † (1956–1960); Helmut Schön † (1956–1964)	22 Nov 1950	7 Jun 1964	4947	97	52	14	31	219	146	+73	53.61	170	134		
Sepp Herberger † (Bundestrainer); Hennes Weisweiler † (1954–1955); Georg Gawliczek † (1956–1960); Helmut Schön † (1956–1964)	22 Nov 1950	7 Jun 1964	4947	97	52	14	31	219	146	+73	53.61	170	134	World Cup 1954	Winners
Sepp Herberger † (Bundestrainer); Hennes Weisweiler † (1954–1955); Georg Gawliczek † (1956–1960); Helmut Schön † (1956–1964)	22 Nov 1950	7 Jun 1964	4947	97	52	14	31	219	146	+73	53.61	170	134	World Cup 1958	Fourth
Sepp Herberger † (Bundestrainer); Hennes Weisweiler † (1954–1955); Georg Gawliczek † (1956–1960); Helmut Schön † (1956–1964)	22 Nov 1950	7 Jun 1964	4947	97	52	14	31	219	146	+73	53.61	170	134	European Championship 1960	DNE
Sepp Herberger † (Bundestrainer); Hennes Weisweiler † (1954–1955); Georg Gawliczek † (1956–1960); Helmut Schön † (1956–1964)	22 Nov 1950	7 Jun 1964	4947	97	52	14	31	219	146	+73	53.61	170	134	World Cup 1962	Quarter-final
Sepp Herberger † (Bundestrainer); Hennes Weisweiler † (1954–1955); Georg Gawliczek † (1956–1960); Helmut Schön † (1956–1964)	22 Nov 1950	7 Jun 1964	4947	97	52	14	31	219	146	+73	53.61	170	134	European Championship 1964	DNE
Sepp Herberger † (total)	15 Nov 1936	7 Jun 1964	7146	162	92	26	44	423	239	+184	56.79	302	216	-	
Helmut Schön†; Dettmar Cramer † (1964–1966); Udo Lattek † (1966–1970); Jupp Derwall † (1970–1978)	4 Nov 1964	21 Jun 1978	4977	139	87	31	21	292	107	+185	62.59	292	98	World Cup 1966	Runners-up
Helmut Schön†; Dettmar Cramer † (1964–1966); Udo Lattek † (1966–1970); Jupp Derwall † (1970–1978)	4 Nov 1964	21 Jun 1978	4977	139	87	31	21	292	107	+185	62.59	292	98	European Championship 1968	DNQ
Helmut Schön†; Dettmar Cramer † (1964–1966); Udo Lattek † (1966–1970); Jupp Derwall † (1970–1978)	4 Nov 1964	21 Jun 1978	4977	139	87	31	21	292	107	+185	62.59	292	98	World Cup 1970	Third
Helmut Schön†; Dettmar Cramer † (1964–1966); Udo Lattek † (1966–1970); Jupp Derwall † (1970–1978)	4 Nov 1964	21 Jun 1978	4977	139	87	31	21	292	107	+185	62.59	292	98	European Championship 1972	Winners
Helmut Schön†; Dettmar Cramer † (1964–1966); Udo Lattek † (1966–1970); Jupp Derwall † (1970–1978)	4 Nov 1964	21 Jun 1978	4977	139	87	31	21	292	107	+185	62.59	292	98	World Cup 1974	Winners
Helmut Schön†; Dettmar Cramer † (1964–1966); Udo Lattek † (1966–1970); Jupp Derwall † (1970–1978)	4 Nov 1964	21 Jun 1978	4977	139	87	31	21	292	107	+185	62.59	292	98	European Championship 1976	Runners-up
Helmut Schön†; Dettmar Cramer † (1964–1966); Udo Lattek † (1966–1970); Jupp Derwall † (1970–1978)	4 Nov 1964	21 Jun 1978	4977	139	87	31	21	292	107	+185	62.59	292	98	World Cup 1978	2nd Group Stage
Jupp Derwall †; Erich Ribbeck (1978–1983); Holger Osieck (1983–1984); Horst Köppel (1984)	11 Oct 1978	20 Jun 1984	2079	67	44	12	11	144	60	+84	65.67	144	46	European Championship 1980	Winners
Jupp Derwall †; Erich Ribbeck (1978–1983); Holger Osieck (1983–1984); Horst Köppel (1984)	11 Oct 1978	20 Jun 1984	2079	67	44	12	11	144	60	+84	65.67	144	46	World Cup 1982	Runners-up
Jupp Derwall †; Erich Ribbeck (1978–1983); Holger Osieck (1983–1984); Horst Köppel (1984)	11 Oct 1978	20 Jun 1984	2079	67	44	12	11	144	60	+84	65.67	144	46	European Championship 1984	Group Stage
Franz Beckenbauer † (Team chief); Horst Köppel (1984–1987); Berti Vogts (1986–1990); Holger Osieck (1987–1990); Sepp Maier (1988-1990) (goalkeeping coach)	12 Sep 1984	8 Jul 1990	2125	66	34	20	12	107	61	+46	51.52	122	40	World Cup 1986	Runners-up
Franz Beckenbauer † (Team chief); Horst Köppel (1984–1987); Berti Vogts (1986–1990); Holger Osieck (1987–1990); Sepp Maier (1988-1990) (goalkeeping coach)	12 Sep 1984	8 Jul 1990	2125	66	34	20	12	107	61	+46	51.52	122	40	European Championship 1988	Semifinal
Franz Beckenbauer † (Team chief); Horst Köppel (1984–1987); Berti Vogts (1986–1990); Holger Osieck (1987–1990); Sepp Maier (1988-1990) (goalkeeping coach)	12 Sep 1984	8 Jul 1990	2125	66	34	20	12	107	61	+46	51.52	122	40	World Cup 1990	Winners
Berti Vogts; Rainer Bonhof; Sepp Maier (goalkeeping coach)	29 Aug 1990	5 Sep 1998	2929	102	66	24	12	206	86	+120	64.71	222	56	European Championship 1992	Runners-up
Berti Vogts; Rainer Bonhof; Sepp Maier (goalkeeping coach)	29 Aug 1990	5 Sep 1998	2929	102	66	24	12	206	86	+120	64.71	222	56	World Cup 1994	Quarterfinal
Berti Vogts; Rainer Bonhof; Sepp Maier (goalkeeping coach)	29 Aug 1990	5 Sep 1998	2929	102	66	24	12	206	86	+120	64.71	222	56	European Championship 1996	Winners
Berti Vogts; Rainer Bonhof; Sepp Maier (goalkeeping coach)	29 Aug 1990	5 Sep 1998	2929	102	66	24	12	206	86	+120	64.71	222	56	World Cup 1998	Quarterfinal
Erich Ribbeck; Uli Stielike; Horst Hrubesch (only EC 2000); Sepp Maier (goalkeeping coach)	10 Oct 1998	20 Jun 2000	619	24	10	6	8	42	31	+11	41.67	36	15	Confederations Cup 1999	Group stage
Erich Ribbeck; Uli Stielike; Horst Hrubesch (only EC 2000); Sepp Maier (goalkeeping coach)	10 Oct 1998	20 Jun 2000	619	24	10	6	8	42	31	+11	41.67	36	15	European Championship 2000	Group stage
Rudi Völler (Team chief); Michael Skibbe; Sepp Maier (goalkeeping coach)	16 Aug 2000	23 Jun 2004	1408	53	29	11	13	109	57	+52	54.72	98	26	World Cup 2002	Runners-up
Rudi Völler (Team chief); Michael Skibbe; Sepp Maier (goalkeeping coach)	16 Aug 2000	23 Jun 2004	1408	53	29	11	13	109	57	+52	54.72	98	26	European Championship 2004	Group stage
Jürgen Klinsmann; Joachim Löw; Andreas Köpke (goalkeeping coach)	18 Aug 2004	8 Jul 2006	690	34	20	8	6	81	43	+38	58.82	68	12	Confederations Cup 2005	Third
Jürgen Klinsmann; Joachim Löw; Andreas Köpke (goalkeeping coach)	18 Aug 2004	8 Jul 2006	690	34	20	8	6	81	43	+38	58.82	68	12	World Cup 2006	Third
Joachim Löw; Hansi Flick (2006–2014); Thomas Schneider (2014–2018); Marcus Sorg (2016–2021); Andreas Köpke (goalkeeping coach)	16 Aug 2006	29 Jun 2021	5431	198 (Note: Matches that were decided on penalties are considered as a draw. The goals scored on penalties are not counted.)	124	40	34	467	200	+267	62.94	412	113	European Championship 2008	Runners-up
Joachim Löw; Hansi Flick (2006–2014); Thomas Schneider (2014–2018); Marcus Sorg (2016–2021); Andreas Köpke (goalkeeping coach)	16 Aug 2006	29 Jun 2021	5431	198	124	40	34	467	200	+267	62.94	412	113	World Cup 2010	Third
Joachim Löw; Hansi Flick (2006–2014); Thomas Schneider (2014–2018); Marcus Sorg (2016–2021); Andreas Köpke (goalkeeping coach)	16 Aug 2006	29 Jun 2021	5431	198	124	40	34	467	200	+267	62.94	412	113	European Championship 2012	Semifinal
Joachim Löw; Hansi Flick (2006–2014); Thomas Schneider (2014–2018); Marcus Sorg (2016–2021); Andreas Köpke (goalkeeping coach)	16 Aug 2006	29 Jun 2021	5431	198	124	40	34	467	200	+267	62.94	412	113	World Cup 2014	Winners
Joachim Löw; Hansi Flick (2006–2014); Thomas Schneider (2014–2018); Marcus Sorg (2016–2021); Andreas Köpke (goalkeeping coach)	16 Aug 2006	29 Jun 2021	5431	198	124	40	34	467	200	+267	62.94	412	113	European Championship 2016	Semifinal
Joachim Löw; Hansi Flick (2006–2014); Thomas Schneider (2014–2018); Marcus Sorg (2016–2021); Andreas Köpke (goalkeeping coach)	16 Aug 2006	29 Jun 2021	5431	198	124	40	34	467	200	+267	62.94	412	113	Confederations Cup 2017	Winners
Joachim Löw; Hansi Flick (2006–2014); Thomas Schneider (2014–2018); Marcus Sorg (2016–2021); Andreas Köpke (goalkeeping coach)	16 Aug 2006	29 Jun 2021	5431	198	124	40	34	467	200	+267	62.94	412	113	World Cup 2018	Group Stage
Joachim Löw; Hansi Flick (2006–2014); Thomas Schneider (2014–2018); Marcus Sorg (2016–2021); Andreas Köpke (goalkeeping coach)	16 Aug 2006	29 Jun 2021	5431	198	124	40	34	467	200	+267	62.94	412	113	European Championship 2020	Round of 16
Hansi Flick; Marcus Sorg; Danny Röhl; Hermann Gerland (only WC 2022); Andreas Kronenberg (Switzerland) (goalkeeping coach)	2 Sep 2021	9 Sep 2023	737	25	12	7	6	60	30	+30	48	43	16	World Cup 2022	Group Stage
Rudi Völler (Interim Teamchief); Hannes Wolf; Sandro Wagner; Andreas Kronenberg (Switzerland) (goalkeeping coach)	12 Sep 2023		1	1	1	0	0	2	1	+1	100	3	0		
Julian Nagelsmann; Benjamin Glück; Sandro Wagner (2023–2025); Benjamin Hübner (2025–2026); Alfred Schreuder (Netherlands) (2026); Andreas Kronenberg (Switzerland) (goalkeeping coach); Michael Fuchs (2023-2025) (goalkeeping coach); Stefan Wessels (2025-2026) (goalkeeping coach)	14 Oct 2023	29 June 2026	989	37	23	7	7	87	39	+48	62.16	76	22	European Championship 2024	Quarterfinal
Julian Nagelsmann; Benjamin Glück; Sandro Wagner (2023–2025); Benjamin Hübner (2025–2026); Alfred Schreuder (Netherlands) (2026); Andreas Kronenberg (Switzerland) (goalkeeping coach); Michael Fuchs (2023-2025) (goalkeeping coach); Stefan Wessels (2025-2026) (goalkeeping coach)	14 Oct 2023	29 June 2026	989	37	23	7	7	87	39	+48	62.16	76	22	2025 UEFA Nations League Finals	Fourth
Julian Nagelsmann; Benjamin Glück; Sandro Wagner (2023–2025); Benjamin Hübner (2025–2026); Alfred Schreuder (Netherlands) (2026); Andreas Kronenberg (Switzerland) (goalkeeping coach); Michael Fuchs (2023-2025) (goalkeeping coach); Stefan Wessels (2025-2026) (goalkeeping coach)	14 Oct 2023	29 June 2026	989	37	23	7	7	87	39	+48	62.16	76	22	World Cup 20226	Round of 32
Jürgen Klopp; Sven Bender; Peter Krawietz; Pepijn Lijnders (Netherlands); Andreas Kronenberg (Switzerland) (goalkeeping coach); Stefan Wessels (goalkeeping coach)	24 Sep 2026	active	59	6	3	2	1	11	3	+8	50	11	12		
Total (Note: Of these, three matches in which Löw was not sitting on the bench because of suspension or illness and was represented by the assistant coach.) (As of 16 Nov. 2026)				1047	605	217	225	2354	1227	+1127	57.78	2032	1003		
With penalty shoot-outs				1047	+6	-9	+3	37	33						
