= Theegarten-Pactec =

German manufacturing company

Theegarten-Pactec GmbH Co. KG
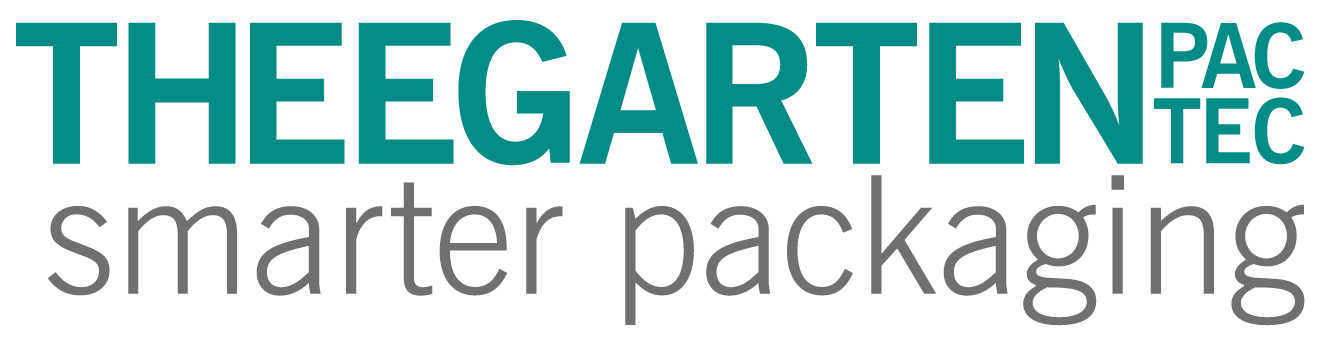
- Company type: GmbH Co. KG
- Industry: Packaging Machinery Industry
- Predecessor: Rose-Theegarten, Nagema, Pactec
- Founded: 19 October 1934 (as Rose-Theegarten GmbH)
- Headquarters: Dresden, Germany
- Key people: Markus Rustler Dr. Egbert Röhm
- Products: Packaging Machines for Bite-Sized Confectionery
- Number of employees: 400 (2018)
- Website: www.theegarten-pactec.com

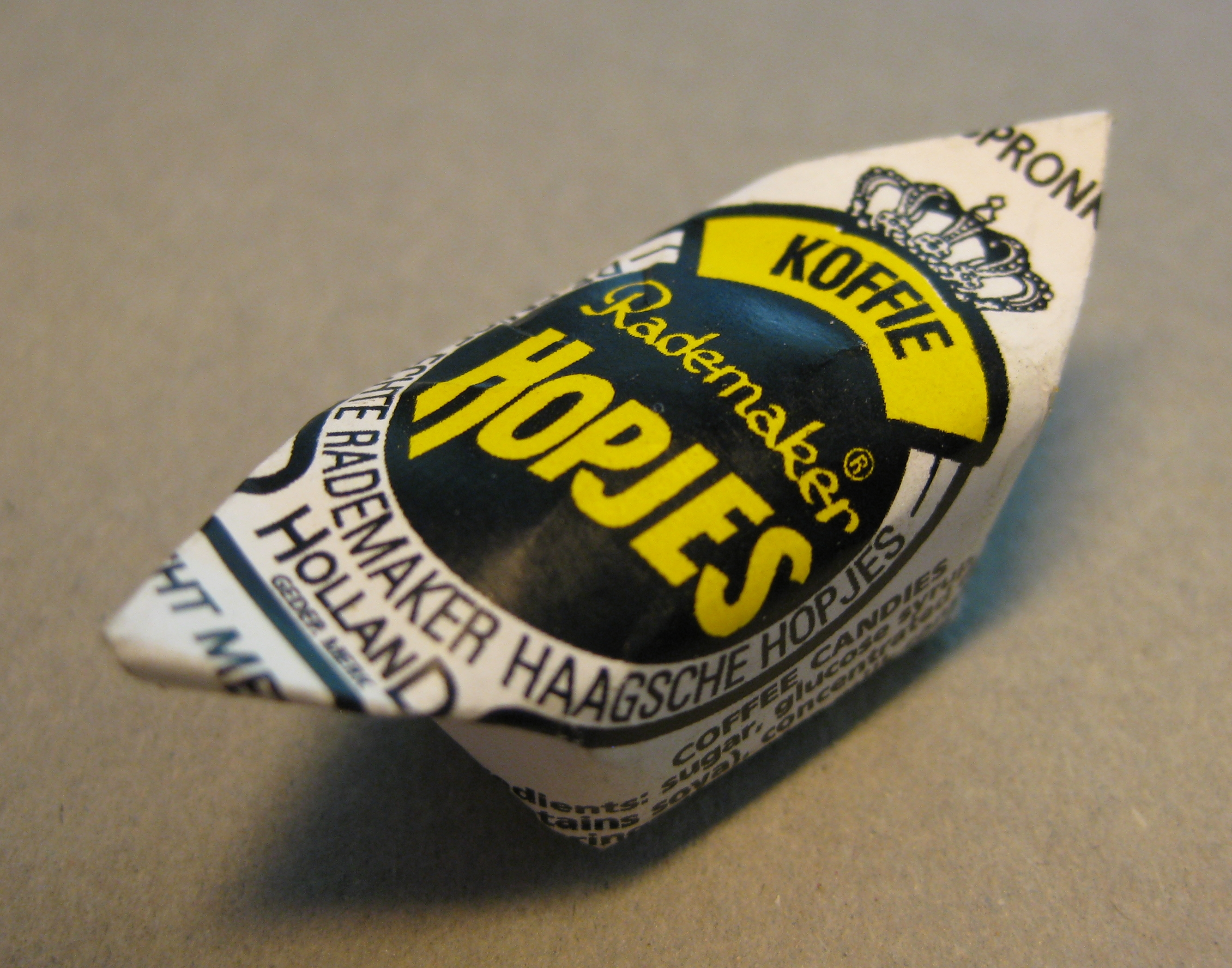

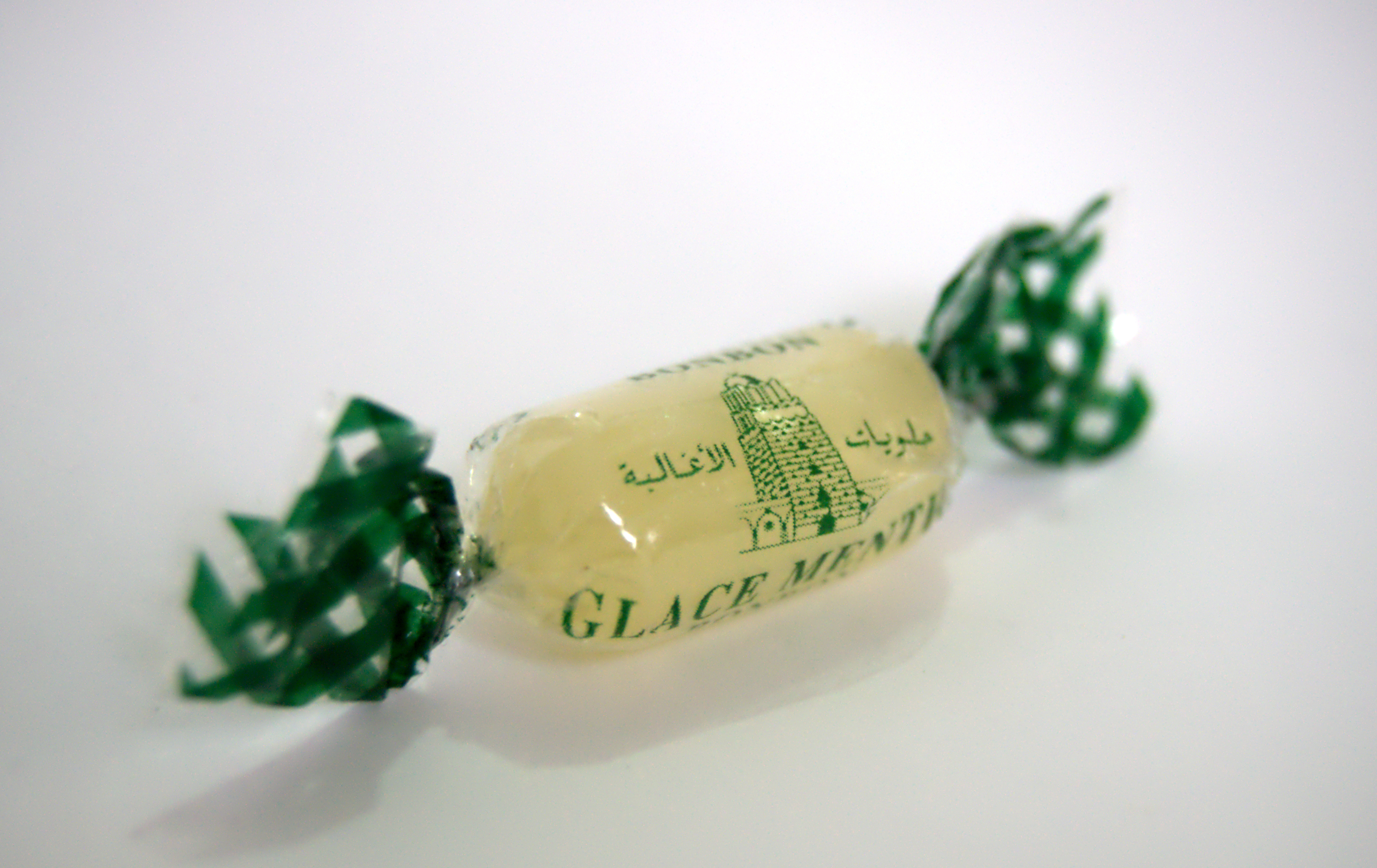
wrapped Candys

Theegarten-Pactec is a German manufacturer in the packaging technology sector. The company develops and produces packaging machines and complete packaging systems for bite-sized confectionery products and other foodstuffs, such as bouillon cubes, as well as for non-food items, e.g. dishwasher detergent. The packaging machines are developed and manufactured exclusively in Germany and are distributed worldwide.
