= Ronny Ernst =

German former footballer

Personal information
- Date of birth: 7 May 1976 (age 50)
- Place of birth: Dresden, East Germany
- Height: 1.76 m (5 ft 9 in)
- Position: Right-back

Youth career
- –1995: Dynamo Dresden

Senior career*
Years	Team	Apps	(Gls)
1995–1996	Dynamo Dresden	30	(0)
1996–1997	1860 Munich (A)	8	(1)
1996–1997	1860 Munich	8	(0)
1997–1998	Greuther Fürth	19	(0)
1998–2000	Waldhof Mannheim	27	(0)
2000–2002	Dresdner SC	43	(4)
2002–2005	Rot-Weiss Essen	76	(3)
2005–2006	Rot-Weiß Oberhausen	33	(0)
2006–2013	SV Straelen		

International career
1996–1997	Germany U-21	13	(0)
- * Club domestic league appearances and goals

Ronny Ernst (born 7 May 1976) is a German former professional footballer who played as a right-back.
