= Martin Haftmann =

German footballer

Personal information
- Date of birth: 16 July 1899
- Date of death: 23 July 1961 (aged 62)
- Position: Forward

Senior career*
| Years | Team | Apps | (Gls) |
- Dresdner SC

International career
| 1927 | Germany | 1 | (0) |
- * Club domestic league appearances and goals

Martin Haftmann (16 July 1899 – 23 July 1961) was a German international footballer.
