= Kurt Stössel =

German footballer

Personal information
- Full name: Kurt Stössel
- Date of birth: 26 December 1907
- Place of birth: Hamburg, German Empire
- Date of death: 15 May 1978 (aged 70)
- Place of death: West Germany
- Positions: Midfielder; forward

Senior career*
Years	Team	Apps	(Gls)
1925–1928	SC Union 03 Altona		
1928–1935	Dresdner SC		
1935–1940	Holstein Kiel		

International career
1931	Germany	1	(0)
- * Club domestic league appearances and goals

Kurt Stössel (26 December 1907 – 15 May 1978) was a German footballer who played as a midfielder or forward and made one appearance for the Germany national team.

== Career ==
Stössel earned his first and only cap for Germany on 26 April 1931 in a friendly against the Netherlands. The away match, which took place in Amsterdam, finished as a 1–1 draw.

== Personal life ==
Stössel died on 15 May 1978 at the age of 70.

== Career statistics ==
=== International ===
Germany
Year	Apps	Goals
1931	1	0
Total	1	0
