= Richard Gedlich =

German footballer

Personal information
- Date of birth: 17 February 1900
- Date of death: 5 January 1971 (aged 70)
- Position: Forward

Senior career*
Years	Team	Apps	(Gls)
- Dresdner SC

International career
1926–1927	Germany	2	(0)
- * Club domestic league appearances and goals

Richard Gedlich (17 February 1900 – 5 January 1971) was a German international footballer.
