= 1965–66 DFB-Pokal =

Tournament details
- Country: West Germany
- Teams: 32

Final positions
- Champions: FC Bayern Munich
- Runner-up: Meidericher SV

Tournament statistics
- Matches played: 32

The 1965–66 DFB-Pokal was the 23rd season of the annual German football cup competition. It began on 22 January 1966 and ended on 4 June 1966. 32 teams competed in the tournament of five rounds. In the final Bayern Munich defeated Meidericher SV 4–2.

== Matches ==
=== Qualification round ===
2 January 1966
FC Bayern Munich	2 – 0	Borussia Dortmund
Borussia Mönchengladbach	5 – 1	SC Opel Rüsselsheim

=== First round ===
22 January 1966
SV Werder Bremen	4 – 0	TSV 1860 München
FC Bayern Munich	1 – 0	Eintracht Braunschweig
1. FC Köln	1 – 1	Tasmania 1900 Berlin	(AET)
Hannover 96	2 – 4	Hamburger SV
Meidericher SV	2 – 0	VfB Stuttgart
Borussia Mönchengladbach	0 – 1	Borussia Neunkirchen	(AET)
SV Südwest Ludwigshafen	0 – 1	1. FC Kaiserslautern
Eintracht Frankfurt	2 – 1	SV Alsenborn
FC Schalke 04	3 – 1	Tennis Borussia Berlin	(AET)
Karlsruher SC	3 – 0	Preußen Münster
TSV Schwaben Augsburg	0 – 1	1. FC Nürnberg
Fortuna Düsseldorf	1 – 2	Kickers Offenbach
FC St. Pauli	4 – 2	1. FC Saarbrücken
Holstein Kiel	3 – 1	Arminia Bielefeld
Freiburger FC	4 – 3	Alemannia Aachen
TuS Haste	1 – 2	Concordia Hamburg

==== Replay ====
29 January 1966
Tasmania 1900 Berlin	0 – 2	1. FC Köln

=== Round of 16 ===
19 February 1966
Hamburger SV	4 – 0	Borussia Neunkirchen
Meidericher SV	6 – 0	FC Schalke 04
1. FC Nürnberg	2 – 1	Eintracht Frankfurt
Freiburger FC	1 – 3	Karlsruher SC
1. FC Kaiserslautern	3 – 0	Holstein Kiel
SV Werder Bremen	2 – 0	Concordia Hamburg
FC St. Pauli	3 – 1	Kickers Offenbach
FC Bayern Munich	2 – 0	1. FC Köln

=== Quarter-finals ===
7 April 1966
Meidericher SV	1 – 0	Karlsruher SC
Hamburger SV	1 – 2	FC Bayern Munich
1. FC Kaiserslautern	3 – 1	SV Werder Bremen
FC St. Pauli	0 – 1	1. FC Nürnberg

=== Semi-finals ===
18 May 1966

1. FC Nürnberg	1 – 2 (a.e.t.)	Bayern Munich
Brungs 59'		Ohlhauser 29'; Nowak 98'

Städtisches Stadion, Nuremberg
Attendance: 58,000
Referee: Handwerker (Ketsch)

18 May 1966

Meidericher SV	4 – 3	1. FC Kaiserslautern
van Haaren 19'; Schmidt 34', 53'; Mielke 66'		Braner 2'; Reitgaßl 50'; Rummel 69'

Wedaustadion, Duisburg
Attendance: 30,000
Referee: Ohmsen (Hamburg)

=== Final ===
4 June 1966
16:00 CET

Meidericher SV	2–4	Bayern Munich
Mielke 28'; Heidemann 72' (pen.)	Report	Ohlhauser 31'; Brenninger 56', 77' (pen.); Beckenbauer 82'

Waldstadion, Frankfurt
Attendance: 60,000
Referee: Gerhard Schulenburg (Hamburg)
