= Barmbecker SG =

German football club

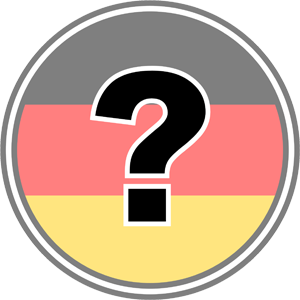
- Full name: Barmbecker Sportgemeinschaft
- Founded: 1939
- Ground: Brucknerstaße
- Capacity: 4,000 (1939)
- League: defunct
Home colours	Away colours

Barmbecker SG was a short-lived wartime German association football club from the Barmbeck (now Barmbek) district in north-central Hamburg. The club played several seasons in the top-flight Gauliga Nordmark and Gauliga Hamburg during World War II.

SG was formed in 1939 as a Kriegsspielgemeinschaft through the consolidation of the local sides Sportverein Uhlenhorst-Herta 1911, Uhlenhorster Sport Club Paloma 1909, and Sport Club Urania Hamburg. This was a common practice during both World Wars to help offset player shortages caused by the conflicts.

SV Uhlenhorst-Herta was formed on 15 January 1915 through the merger of Uhlenhorster Fußball Klub 1911 and Fußball Club 1913 Hamburg. This club was also part of an earlier wartime union in 1917 during World War I when they played alongside SC Germania 1887 Hamburg as SV Germania-Herta 1887 Hamburg.

Uhlenhorster SC Paloma was the product of the 1914 merger of Uhlenhorster Sport Club 1911 and Schlagballverein Sport Club Paloma Hamburg, which was in turn joined in 1928 by Sportvereinigung Phöbus-Meteor 1920 Hamburg.

Barmbecker SG took up play in the Gauliga Nordmark (I) in 1939 and played in the opening rounds of the Tschammerspokal, predecessor of today's German Cup. When competition was restructured in 1942, the team qualified for the new Gauliga Hamburg (I). They were unsuccessful there and slipped to the Bezirksklasse Hamburg/Hammonia (II), but immediately bounced back by capturing the lower division title in 1944. SG disappeared following the 1944–45 season with the end of the war.

== Honours ==
- Bezirksklasse Hamburg/Hammonia champions (II): 1944
