= Nagema =

Nagema was a manufacturing association of state-owned enterprises (VVB) and later a combine, headquartered in Dresden, East Germany. It was formed in 1948 as the legal successor to the Gäbel Maschinen-Fabrik Dresden-Mockritz and ceased to exist in 1990. It had 21,000 employees as of 31 December 1989 and produced a variety of packaging machines for the food industry. From the 1970s, Nagema (as a combine) also consisted of many subsidiary companies unrelated to food packaging, one of which, Wägetechnik Rapido Radebeul, assisted VEB Robotron in manufacturing Robotron 400 ATM machines for the East German Sparkassen as well as the Staatsbank der DDR in the early-1980s, which were among the first ATM machines to be introduced in East Germany.

== See also ==
- Theegarten-Pactec

== Sources ==
- industriesourcing.com: "Continuing the work of three generations", 10/16/2010
- Foodstuffs Industry: Nagema, July 13, 2011
