= Karl Barufka =

German footballer (1921–1999)

Personal information
- Date of birth: 15 May 1921
- Place of birth: Gelsenkirchen, Germany
- Date of death: 4 April 1999 (aged 77)
- Position: Midfielder

Senior career*
Years	Team	Apps	(Gls)
1939–1942	Schalke 04		
1942–1944	SpVgg Wilhelmshaven		
1945–1946	VfB Stuttgart		
1946–1947	1. FC Pforzheim		
1947	Schalke 04		
1948–1955	VfB Stuttgart		

International career
1950–1951	West Germany	3	(0)
- * Club domestic league appearances and goals

Karl Barufka (15 May 1921 – 4 April 1999) was a German footballer who played as a midfielder for Schalke 04, SpVgg Wilhelmshaven, VfB Stuttgart and 1. FC Pforzheim.
