= Karl Miller (footballer) =

German footballer

Personal information
- Date of birth: 2 October 1913
- Place of birth: Hamburg, German Reich
- Date of death: 18 April 1967 (aged 53)
- Position: Defender

Senior career*
Years	Team	Apps	(Gls)
1932–1939	FC St. Pauli		
1940–1942	Dresdner SC		
1942	FC St. Pauli		
1943–1944	LSV Hamburg		
1944–1950	FC St. Pauli		

International career
1941–1942	Germany	12	(0)
- * Club domestic league appearances and goals

Karl Miller (2 October 1913 – 18 April 1967) was a German footballer who played as a defender for FC St. Pauli, Dresdner SC, LSV Hamburg and the Germany national team.

== Early life ==
Miller was born in the Neustadt region of Hamburg as the son of a butcher.

== Club career ==
Miller started his career at FC St. Pauli, making his debut for the club in the 1932–33 season. He was also selected to represent a North German representative team in 1935. During World War II, he was stationed at a Luftwaffe unit in Saxony whilst playing as a guest player for Dresdner SC. With Dresdner SC he won the Tschammerpokal in 1940 and 1941. He returned to Hamburg and played for FC St. Pauli and LSV Hamburg before returning to St. Pauli again in 1944. He retired following the 1949–50 season, aged 37.

== International career ==
Miller played 12 times for the Germany national football team between 1941 and 1942.
