= Otto Faist =

German athlete and football coach

Personal information
- Date of birth: 11 March 1903
- Place of birth: Karlsruhe, Germany
- Date of death: 1 February 1946 (aged 42)
- Place of death: Kovel, Soviet Union

Managerial career
- Years: Team
- 1930–1931: SV Wiesbaden
- 1931–1932: Bulgaria (6)
- 1932–1933: Kölner SC 1899
- 1933–1935: Arminia Bielefeld
- 1937–1938: Rot-Weiß Oberhausen
- 1938–1942: Schalke 04
- 1943–1944: LSV Mölders Krakau
Medal record
Bulgaria
Balkan Cup
Gold medal – first place	1931 Balkan Cup	Team
Gold medal – first place	1932 Balkan Cup	Team

Otto Faist (11 March 1903 – 1 February 1946 (Note: According to military records, Faist fell on 1 February 1945, but in March 1945 he wrote a letter to his wife. Other statements speak of death in Soviet captivity. According to the article "Searching for clues" in the Schalker Kreisel of 28 April 2012, "an affidavit [...] dates his death to February 1946".)) was a German athlete and football coach.

Faist was an active track and field athlete for the Karlsruher FC Phönix, making a name for himself as a runner on the short and medium distances. After retiring from sprinting, he led the Bulgarian national team to a Balkan Cup title in 1931. He then took charge of FC Schalke 04, whom he led to three Bundesliga titles in 1939, 1940, and 1942.

== Early life ==
Otto Faist was born on 11 March 1903 in Karlsruhe, where his parents Wilhelm and Luise Faist ran the Zum Scheffelhof inn in their own house at Ludwig-Wilhelm-Straße no. 12. He attended the Humboldtschule (today Kantgymnasium on Englerstrasse, trained as a businessman after graduating from high school and studied at the commercial college in Mannheim in 1925.

== Sporting career ==
=== Athletic career ===
In the 1920s, Faist's parents' Scheffelhof was the meeting place for members of the FC Phönix stadium in Wildpark, which was not too far away. In 1921, Faist joined the FC Phönix athletics department, which was re-established that year, becoming one of the club's best sporting talents, with coach Georg Amberger leading him to great success. Between 1924 and 1927, he won with FC Phoenix the 100, 200 and 400-meter distances and various relays (4 x 100 meters, 10 x 100 meters, 20 x 300 meters, 4 x 400 meters, Swedish relay), in fact, with the FC Phoenix 4 x 100 meter relay team he ran the German record twice in 1926 (the latter being 3:24.2 minutes) and on 19 September in Kassel he ran the European record for club relays with 41.9 seconds. FC Phoenix's successful 4 x 100 meter relay team (Alex Nathan, Faist, Kurt von Rappard, Robert Suhr) was nicknamed "the flying Karlsruhers" in the press. In 1926 he became a German champion with the Phoenix sprint relay.

In 1926 alone, Faist recorded 25 athletics events between May and the beginning of October, not only in Germany, but also in Austria, Switzerland, and in Paris, being the first German athlete to compete there after the First World War, usually with several starts. As one of the most successful sprinters of the Weimar Republic's middle years, Faist was a member of the German national athletics team in 1925 and 1926 and was considered a candidate for participation in the 1928 Olympic Games, but he was prevented to do so due to an injury. In 1925 and 1926 he was called up to the national team, winning the Baden, South German (in the 800-meter run), and German championships as well as many other placements in the top three.

Faist started for his hometown club in 1927, but joined the Berlin SC Charlottenburg sprint relay team in 1928, and with its 4 x 100-meter relay team, of which Nathan was also a member, he became German runner-up.

=== Managerial career ===
After the 1926 season, Faist went to Berlin to study at the German University for Physical Education in Berlin, where he was taught by the then national manager Otto Nerz. At the end of this year, Faist completed his studies with a focus on football as a qualified physical education teacher and gymnastics and sports teacher. In 1930, he was recognized as a football coach by the German Football Association, taking over SV Wiesbaden.

In the following year, he went to Bulgaria, where he replaced Pavel Grozdanov as the new head coach of the Bulgarian national team in 1931, at the age of 28. Despite being his first time outside of German football, Faist adapted quickly and after losing his first two games to Yugoslavia and Romania, he led Bulgaria to a 2–2 draw against the B team of the then world champions Italy in a friendly match on 17 May 1931. He then won three competitive games in a row, two of which for the 1931 Balkan Cup, a 5–1 trashing of Turkey, and an epic 3–2 victory over Yugoslavia after being 0–2 at half-time; two impressive performances that sealed Bulgaria's first-ever piece of silverware, for which he was awarded the Grand Medal of Honor from the Bulgarian Olympic Committee.

After returning to the German Reich, Faist initially worked for the Cologne Sports Club 1899 in 1932–33. He was then active at several other clubs in the west, partly part-time, until 1937. For the 1937–38 season, he was hired by Rot-Weiß Oberhausen, where the "excellent sports teacher" could not meet expectations, mainly due to a series of injuries among his squad, which was already far too small, and he was dismissed in the fall of 1938. In 1938, on the recommendation of the then national coach Sepp Herberger, Faist replaced "Bumbes" Schmidt as the new coach of SC Schalke 04, with Herberger being in contact with him about the release of players for the national team. He led the Royal Blues in 43 games, winning three German championships in 1939, 1940, and 1942; and was twice in the final of the Tschammer Cup, now the DFB-Pokal, in 1941 and 1942.

== Military career ==
Faist was a "convinced supporter of Adolf Hitler" and joined the Nazi Party on 1 May 1933 and briefly held the position of district sports officer for the Nazi organization Kraft durch Freude (KdF) in Gelsenkirchen. During the Second World War, in January 1942 he was drafted into the Wehrmacht, but received special leave for the championship finals. After training at various locations in Germany, he was briefly deployed as a radio operator in the Luftwaffe in Hamburg and Norway and then in the General Government near Kraków. The Luftwaffe used him as a coach for the Air Force Sports Club LSV Mölders Krakau, which won the General Government Cup under him in 1943 and 1944.

In a letter from March 1945, front-line soldier Faist wrote to his wife about "believing in our ultimate victory". Only when he was fleeing the Eastern Front and retreating from the advancing Soviet army, did the experiences of hardship and misery of the civilian population as refugees make him realize that the regime of the Third Reich was a criminal one, writing in a field post letter that his enthusiasm for National Socialism had evaporated. At the end of the war, Faist was taken prisoner by the Soviets in what is now Saxony and was first sent to the Elsterhorst camp, and later to the Kovel prison camp in the Ukrainian SSR, where he died in February 1946, probably from typhoid fever and from exhaustion. The exact date of his death is unknown, as is his final resting place. His widow and three children did not receive the news of his death until April 1948.

== Honours ==
=== As a coach ===
Bulgaria

- Balkan Cup:
  - Champions (2): 1931 and 1932

FC Schalke 04

- Bundesliga:
  - Champions (3): 1938–39, 1939–40, and 1941–42
- DFB-Pokal:
  - Runner-up (2): 1941 and 1942

== Bibliography ==
- Goch, Stefan; Silberbach, Norbert (2005). Zwischen Blau und Weiß liegt Grau [Between blue and white lies gray] (in German). Essen: Klartext. p. 338. ISBN 3-89861-433-6.
- Bräunche, Ernst Otto (2006). Sport in Karlsruhe: von den Anfängen bis heute [Sport in Karlsruhe: from the beginning to today] (in German). Karlsruhe: Karlsruhe City Archives. p. 258. ISBN 3-88190-440-9.
