= 1940 Tschammerpokal =

Tournament details
- Country: Germany
- Teams: 64

Final positions
- Champions: Dresdner SC
- Runners-up: 1. FC Nürnberg

Tournament statistics
- Matches played: 65

The 1940 Tschammerpokal was the 6th season of the annual German football cup competition. In the final which was held on 1 December 1940 in the Olympiastadion Dresdner SC defeated 1. FC Nürnberg 2–1 after extra time. It was the first final which was not decided in regular time.

== Matches ==
=== First round ===
18 August 1940
| SpVgg Fürth | 3 – 0 | VfB Stuttgart |
| FC Bayern Munich | 0 – 1 | Wiener SC |
| 1. SV Jena | 0 – 1 | TuRa Leipzig |
| VfB Königsberg | 3 – 2 | SC Preußen Danzig | (AET) |
| BuEV Danzig | 6 – 2 | Luftwaffen SV Stettin |
| Blau-Weiß 90 Berlin | 1 – 2 | SV Werder Bremen |
| Hallescher FV Sportfreunde | 0 – 7 | FC Schalke 04 |
| SV 08 Steinach | 4 – 2 | CSC 03 Kassel |
| SV Dessau 05 | 2 – 2 | Kickers Offenbach |
| Eimsbütteler TV | 0 – 3 | Spandauer SV |
| Blumenthaler SV | 3 – 1 | Hamburger SV |
| SV 07 Linden | 2 – 3 | SC Union 06 Oberschöneweide |
| SV 07 Hildesheim | 2 – 3 | Barmbeker SG | (AET) |
| VfL Osnabrück | 2 – 5 | BSG Gelsenguß Gelsenkirchen |
| TuS Neheim | 2 – 3 | SG Eschweiler |
| BSG Edelstahlwerke Krefeld | 3 – 4 | Rot-Weiß Essen |
| TuS Germania Mudersbach | 1 – 8 | Schwarz-Weiß Essen |
| TuS Neuendorf | 1 – 2 | VfR Mannheim |
| BC Sport Kassel | 4 – 5 | TuS 48/99 Duisburg |
| Eintracht Frankfurt | 3 – 2 | Westfalia Herne |
| 1. FC Kaiserslautern | 2 – 3 | Fortuna Düsseldorf |
| SV Waldhof Mannheim | 2 – 3 | Reichsbahn TuSV Frankfurt | (AET) |
| Phönix Karlsruhe | 4 – 2 | FSV Frankfurt |
| SpVgg Cannstatt | 0 – 7 | Wacker Wien |
| VfR 07 Schweinfurt | 2 – 1 | Mühlheimer SV 06 | (AET) |
| Sturm Graz | 1 – 6 | 1. FC Nürnberg |
| NSTG Vitkovice | 6 – 0 | SC Hertha Breslau |
| VfL Stettin | 3 – 2 | PSV Chemnitz |
| Planitzer SC | 3 – 1 | Vorwärts-Rasensport Gleiwitz |
| VfB Waldshut | 0 – 8 | Stuttgarter Kickers |
| NSTG Graslitz | 0 – 4 | Dresdner SC |
| Neumeyer Nürnberg | 1 – 2 | Rapid Wien | (AET) |

==== Replay ====
| Kickers Offenbach | 4 – 0 | SV Dessau 05 |

=== Second round ===
| Spandauer SV | 3 – 5 | VfB Königsberg |
| SC Union Oberschöneweide | 5 – 1 | SV 08 Steinach |
| VfL Stettin | 0 – 0 | BuEV Danzig |
| TuRa Leipzig | 1 – 2 | SpVgg Fürth |
| Dresdner SC | 5 – 0 | Blumenthaler Sv |
| Barmbeker SG | 3 – 10 | Schwarz-Weiß Essen |
| FC Schalke 04 | 5 – 0 | SV Werder Bremen |
| Rot-Weiß Essen | 0 – 2 | Eintracht Frankfurt |
| Fortuna Düsseldorf | 2 – 0 | VfR Mannheim |
| SG Eschweiler | 3 – 1 | TuS 48/99 Duisburg |
| Reichsbahn TuSV Frankfurt | 1 – 0 | Phönix Karlsruhe |
| Stuttgarter Kickers | 9 – 2 | BSG Gelsengruß Gelsenkirchen |
| 1. FC Nürnberg | 3 – 2 | Kickers Offenbach |
| Wacker Wien | 6 – 2 | Planitzer SC |
| Wiener SC | 9 – 1 | NSTG Vitkovice |
| Rapid Wien | 7 – 1 | VfR 07 Schweinfurt |

==== Replay ====
| BuEV Danzig | 2 – 1 | VfL Stettin |

=== Round of 16 ===
| SC Union 06 Oberschöneweide | 0 – 1 | 1. FC Nürnberg |
| SpVgg Fürth | 2 – 1 | FC Schalke 04 |
| Stuttgarter Kickers | 1 – 5 | SK Rapid Wien |
| Eintracht Frankfurt | 2 – 3 | Fortuna Düsseldorf |
| Schwarz-Weiß Essen | 5 – 2 | SG Eschweiler |
| SC Wacker Wien | 5 – 6 | Wiener SC |
| Dresdner SC | 6 – 0 | Reichsbahn TuSV Frankfurt |
| VfB Königsberg | 5 – 1 | BuEV Danzig |

=== Quarter-finals ===
| 1. FC Nürnberg | 2 – 1 | Schwarz-Weiß Essen |
| SK Rapid Wien | 6 – 1 | SpVgg Fürth |
| Fortuna Düsseldorf | 2 – 1 | Wiener SC |
| VfB Königsberg | 0 – 8 | Dresdner SC |

=== Semi-finals ===
| Dresdner SC | 3 – 1 | SK Rapid Wien |
| Fortuna Düsseldorf | 0 – 1 | 1. FC Nürnberg |

=== Final ===
1 December 1940

| 1. FC Nürnberg | 1–2 (a.e.t.) | Dresdner SC |
|---|---|---|
| Gußner 32' | Report | Machate 20'; Schaffner 94' |

Olympiastadion, Berlin
Attendance: 60,000
Referee: Alois Pennig (Mannheim)
