= Hermann Eppenhoff =

German footballer and manager (1919–1992)

Personal information
- Date of birth: 19 May 1919
- Place of birth: Wanne-Eickel, Germany
- Date of death: 10 April 1992 (aged 72)
- Place of death: Gelsenkirchen, Germany
- Position: Forward

Senior career*
Years	Team	Apps	(Gls)
–1938	SpVgg Röhlinghausen		
1938	TuS Tiefenbach		
1938–1943	FC Schalke 04		
1943–1944	Rote Jäger		
1949–1955	FC Schalke 04		

International career
1940–1942	Germany	3	(3)

Managerial career
- 1956–1958: TuRa Bergkamen
- 1958–1961: Sportfreunde Gladbeck
- 1961–1965: Borussia Dortmund
- 1965–1967: Meidericher SV
- 1967–1972: VfL Bochum
- 1972–1974: VfB Stuttgart
- 1976–1977: SG Union Solingen
Medal record
FC Schalke 04
Winner	Gauliga Westfalen	1938–39
Winner	German Championship	1939
Winner	Gauliga Westfalen	1939–40
Winner	German Championship	1940
Runner-up	German Supercup	1940
Winner	Gauliga Westfalen	1940–41
Runner-up	German Championship	1941
Runner-up	Tschammerpokal	1941
Winner	Gauliga Westfalen	1941–42
Winner	German Championship	1942
Runner-up	Tschammerpokal	1942
Winner	Oberliga West	1950–51
Borussia Dortmund
Runner-up	Oberliga West	1962–63
Winner	German Championship	1963
Runner-up	DFB-Pokal	1962–63
Winner	DFB-Pokal	1964–65
Meidericher SV
Runner-up	DFB-Pokal	1965–66
VfL Bochum
Runner-up	DFB-Pokal	1967–68
Runner-up	Regionalliga West	1968–69
Winner	Regionalliga West	1969–70
Winner	Regionalliga West	1970–71
- * Club domestic league appearances and goals

Hermann Eppenhoff (19 May 1919 – 10 April 1992) was a German football player and manager.

== Playing career ==
The forward was a member of FC Schalke 04 squad, which won the German Championship in the years 1939, 1940 and 1942. He also won three caps with the Germany national team.

== Coaching career ==
Later on he served as a manager for Borussia Dortmund, winning the German Championship in 1963 and also making it to the final of the DFB-Pokal in the same year. Two years later he won the 1964–65 DFB-Pokal with Dortmund.

After switching to Meidericher SV he made it to the cup final once again in 1965–66, where his team was defeated by Bayern Munich.

After several years at VfL Bochum, where he made the cup final yet again in 1967–68, he eventually switched to VfB Stuttgart.

In May 1975, Eppenhoff signed a one year contract to coach Werder Bremen. Eppenhoff suffered a heart attack in late 1975 and the club terminated his contract and replaced him with Herbert Burdenski. Eppenhoff subsequently sued and the sides reached a settlement.

== Filmography ==
- Das Grosse Spiel (1942)
