= Hans Klodt =

German footballer

Personal information
- Full name: Johann Klodt
- Date of birth: 10 June 1914
- Place of birth: Gelsenkirchen, Germany
- Date of death: 7 November 1996 (aged 82)
- Place of death: Gelsenkirchen, Germany
- Position: Goalkeeper

Youth career
- –1935: BV Gelsenkirchen

Senior career*
Years	Team	Apps	(Gls)
1935–1948	Schalke 04		(0)
1948–1955	SpVg Beckum		(0)

International career
1938–1941	Germany	17	(0)
- * Club domestic league appearances and goals

Hans Klodt (10 June 1914 – 7 November 1996) was a German football player.

== Club career ==
Born in Gelsenkirchen, he was the older brother of Bernhard Klodt (also an international footballer - they are among 14 sets of siblings to have played for Germany). Like his brother, he played for FC Schalke 04 where between 1936 and 1948 he stood in goal. In 1937 he won the German Bundesliga as well as the Tschammer Cup. In 1942 and 1943, he was replaced by Heinz Flotho due to a war injury, and thus missed winning the championship in 1942.

His career began not at Schalke 04 but at BV Gelsenkirchen. In 1948, he left Schalke for Beckum, where he played until 1955.

== International career ==
Between 1938 and 1941 he made a total of 17 appearances for the Germany national team.
