= DFC Germania Prag =

German football club

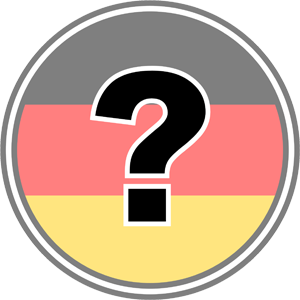
- Full name: Deutscher Fussball Club 1899 Prag
- Founded: 1899
- –: defunct
| Home colours | Away colours |

DFC Germania Prag was a German association football club from the city of Prague. It was one of many clubs formed by players of ethnic German origin in that part of the Austrian-Hungarian Empire that would become Czechoslovakia. These clubs would play a role in the early development of the sport there and in Germany. Alongside DFC Prag it was a founding member of the Deutscher Fussball Bund (German Football Association) at Leipzig in 1900.

== History ==
After playing for both Regatta Prag and DFC Prag, Heinrich Nonner decided to organize his own club and established Unitas Prag in 1898. The club was soon renamed Urania and then finally Germania and quickly had its own field and clubhouse. Founder and captain Nonner attended the inaugural meeting of the DFB to represent the team.

Early in its history the club played in the Verband der Deutschen Prager Fussballvereine (Federation of German Football Teams in Prague) and captured the league title in 1902. The next season, in one of a series of quirks of history that eventually led DFC Prag to the first-ever German national final, that club was selected as the league's representative in the German championship round despite being tied with Germania and a third club in the still incomplete VDPF championship.

In 1903, Germania abandoned Prague for the bordertown of Graslitz to become DFC Graslitz. When Germany joined FIFA in 1904, Czech teams were no longer eligible for play in the DFB. FIFA rebuffed attempts to create ethnic German and Slavic football associations within the borders of the fractious Austro-Hungarian empire, preferring to stay clear of politics. These clubs became part of the domestic Czech league.

After the annexation of the Sudetenland by the Third Reich in 1938 the club joined the Gauliga Sudetenland, a top-flight division established to accommodate clubs in the region within the league structure of German football. Re-organized as NSTG Graslitz (Nationalsozialistische Turngemeinde Graslitz or National Socialist Gymnastics Organization of Graslitz) in 1939 the team captured the divisional title in 1940 and went on to make an appearance in the preliminary round of play for the Tschammerpokal, predecessor of today's German Cup, being put out 0:4 by eventual cup winner Dresdner SC. Graslitz played only a partial season in 1940–41 and was then out of the Gauliga until returning for a single season in 1943–44. The team folded after the liberation of Czechoslovakia at the end of World War II.

== Honours ==
- VDPF champions: 1902
- Gauliga Sudetenland champions: 1940
