= VfL Stettin =

German football club

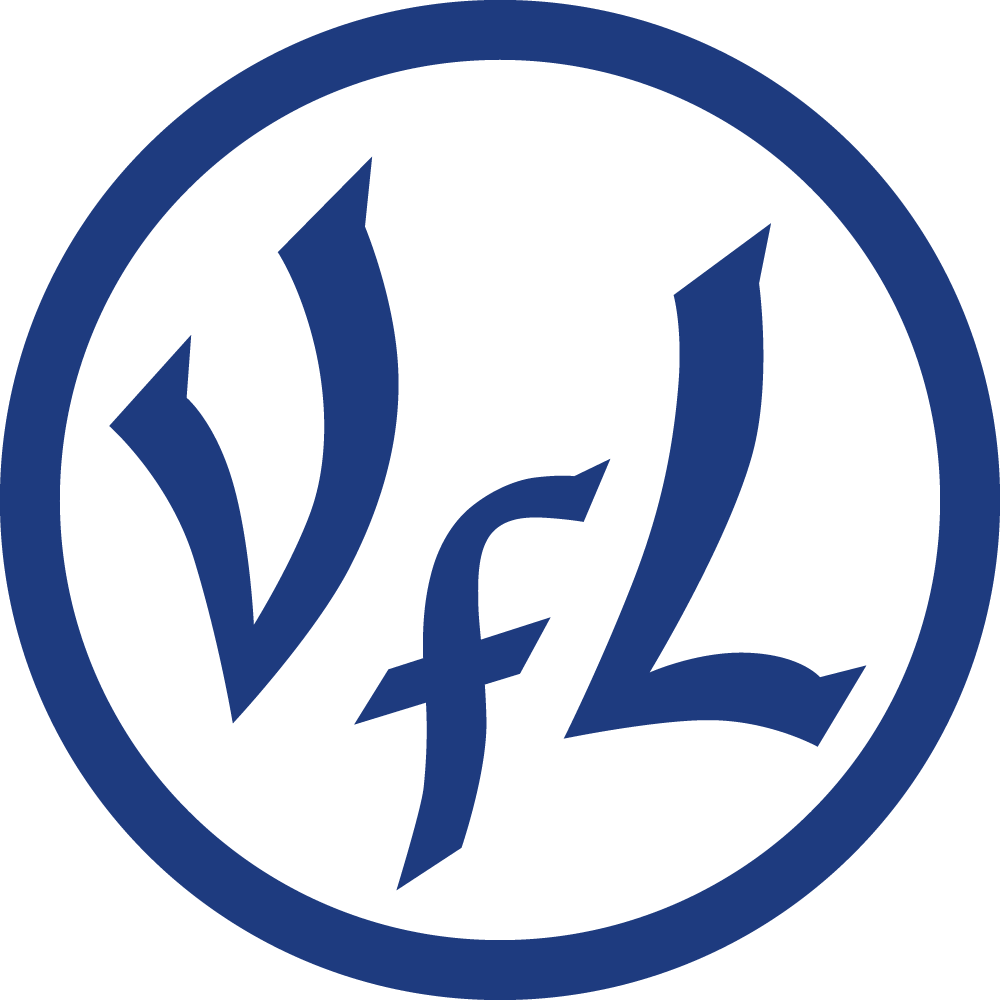
- Full name: Verein für Leibesübungen Stettin e.V.
- Founded: 1912
- Ground: Deutscher Berg
- Capacity: 2,500
- League: Baltenverband (Pommern)
- –: defunct
Home colours	Away colours

VfL Stettin was a German football club from the city of Stettin, Pomerania (today Szczecin, Poland). The club dissolved at the end of the Second World War.

The origins of the club are in the establishment in 1912 of a football department within the gymnastics club Turnverein Stettin. The team went its own way as the independent side Verein für Leibesübungen Stettin in 1925. In 1930 the membership of Titania Stettin, which failed through bankruptcy, became part of VfL.

VfL twice took part unsuccessfully in the end round of the Pommern group of the Baltenverband in the early 30s. Following the re-organization of German football into 16 top-flight divisions under the Third Reich the club joined the Pommern-West group of the Gauliga Pommern. In three seasons there they were a lower table side and were finally relegated after a 7th-place finish at the end of the 1935–36 season. VfL returned to first division play in 1939, capturing the Gauliga Pommern-West group and then defeating Germania Stolp (2:1, 0:1, 5:2) to claim the overall Gauliga Pommern championship. They were quickly eliminated in their only national level post-season appearance. Their title also earned them a place in the 1940 Tschammerspokal tournament, predecessor to today's DFB-Pokal (German Cup), where they advanced two rounds before being eliminated by BuEV Danzig. Stettin was relegated after another three-year turn ending in a last place finish in 1943. They played 3 matches in a truncated Gauliga Stettin season in 1944–45 before the country was overrun by advancing Allied forces at the end of World War II. The club disappeared at war's end as the city and surrounding region became part of Poland.

== Honours ==
- Gauliga Pommern (I) champions: 1940
