= Herbert Pohl =

German footballer

Personal information
- Date of birth: 18 September 1916
- Date of death: 21 November 2010 (aged 94)
- Position: Midfielder

Senior career*
Years	Team	Apps	(Gls)
- Dresdner SC

International career
1941	Germany	2	(0)
- * Club domestic league appearances and goals

Herbert Pohl (18 September 1916 – 21 November 2010) was a German international footballer.
