= Willibald Kreß =

German footballer (1906–1989)

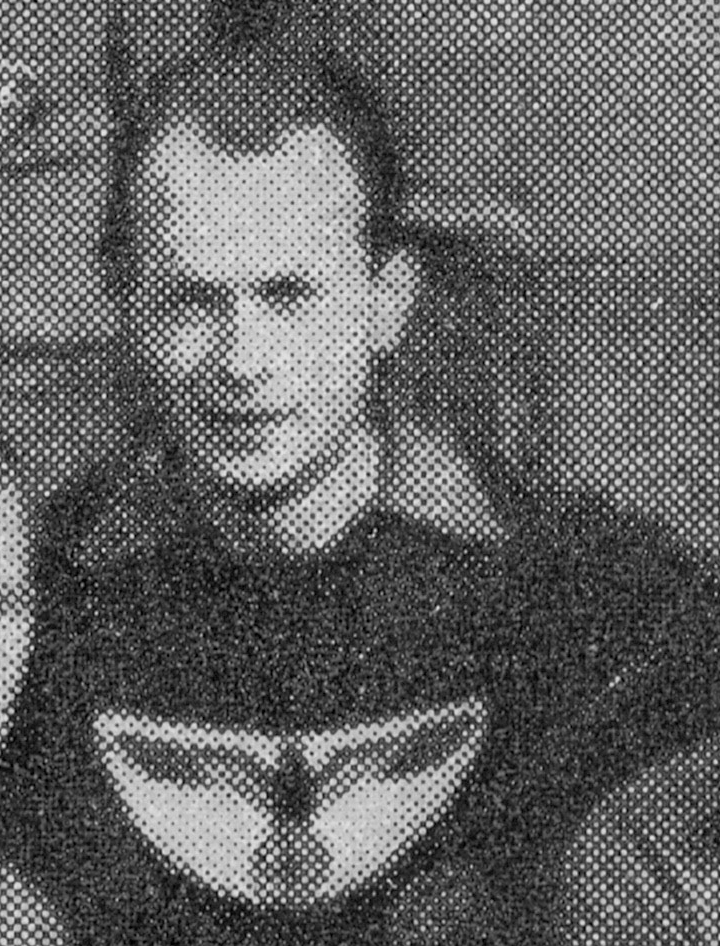

Personal information
- Date of birth: 13 November 1906
- Place of birth: Frankfurt, German Empire
- Date of death: 27 January 1989 (aged 82)
- Place of death: West Germany
- Height: 1.83 m (6 ft 0 in)
- Position: Goalkeeper

Senior career*
Years	Team	Apps	(Gls)
1929–1932	Rot-Weiß Frankfurt		
1932	Mulhouse		
1933–1944	Dresdner SC		
1947–1949	FSV Frankfurt		

International career
1929–1934	Germany	16	(0)

Managerial career
- 1947–1949: FSV Frankfurt
- 1957–1959: Wormatia Worms
- 1959–1961: Wuppertaler SV
- * Club domestic league appearances and goals

Willibald Kreß (13 November 1906 – 27 January 1989) was a German footballer who participated at the 1934 FIFA World Cup.

== Club career ==
Kreß played club football with Rot-Weiß Frankfurt and Dresdner SC. In 1932, he was signed by FC Mulhouse but couldn't play a league match because of a DFB suspension.

== International career ==
Kreß won 16 caps for the Germany national team.

== Coaching career ==
He later managed FSV Frankfurt and Wuppertaler SV.
