= Helmut Schubert =

German footballer

Personal information
- Full name: Helmut Schubert
- Date of birth: 17 February 1916
- Place of birth: Germany
- Date of death: 24 July 1988 (aged 72)
- Position: Midfielder

Senior career*
Years	Team	Apps	(Gls)
1938–1944	Dresdner SC		
1949–1954	BSG Motor Zwickau		

International career
1941	Germany	3	(0)
- * Club domestic league appearances and goals

Helmut Schubert (17 February 1916 – 24 July 1988) was a German international footballer who played for Dresdner SC and BSG Motor Zwickau.
