= Georg Köhler =

German footballer (1900–1972)

Personal information
- Date of birth: 1 February 1900
- Date of death: 27 January 1972 (aged 71)
- Position: Midfielder

Senior career*
Years	Team	Apps	(Gls)
- Dresdner SC

International career
1925–1928	Germany	5	(0)

Managerial career
- Dresdner SC
- * Club domestic league appearances and goals

Georg Köhler (1 February 1900 – 27 January 1972) was a German football player and coach. He made five appearances for the Germany national team.
