= Walter Dzur =

German footballer

Personal information
- Date of birth: 18 November 1919
- Date of death: 19 October 1999 (aged 79)
- Position: Midfielder

Senior career*
Years	Team	Apps	(Gls)
- Dresdner SC

International career
1940–1941	Germany	3	(0)
- * Club domestic league appearances and goals

Walter Dzur (18 November 1919 – 19 October 1999) was a German international footballer.
