= Helmut Schön =

German football player and manager (1915–1996)

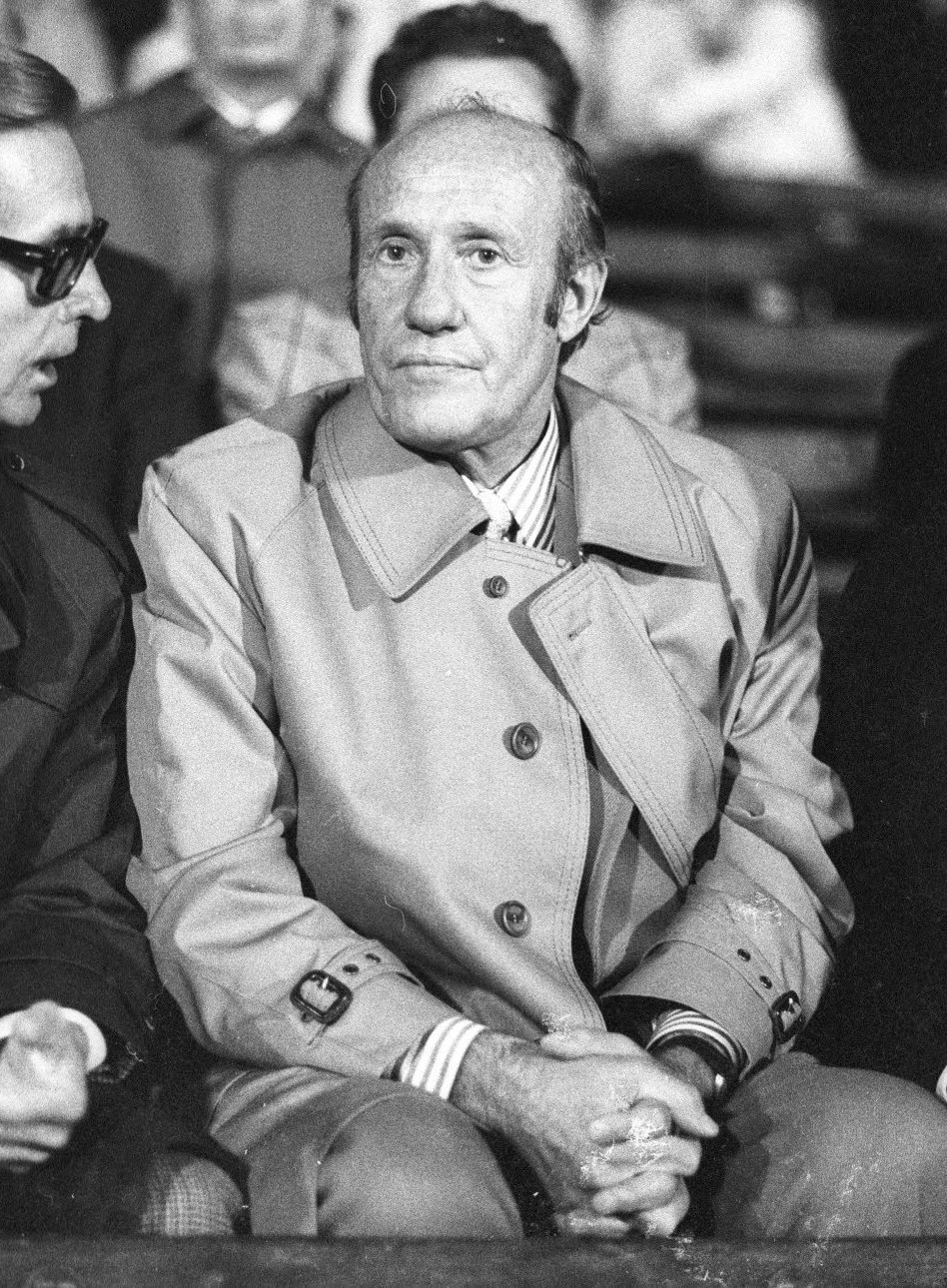
- Schön in 1973

Personal information
- Full name: Helmut Schön
- Date of birth: 15 September 1915
- Place of birth: Dresden, German Empire
- Date of death: 23 February 1996 (aged 80)
- Place of death: Wiesbaden, Germany
- Height: 1.86 m (6 ft 1 in)
- Position: Forward

Youth career
- 1925–1927: Dresdensia Dresden
- 1930–1933: Dresdner SC

Senior career*
Years	Team	Apps	(Gls)
1932–1944	Dresdner SC		
1946–1950	SG Dresden-Friedrichstadt		
1947	→ FC St. Pauli (loan)	3	(0)
1950	Hertha BSC	3	(1)

International career
1937–1941	Germany	16	(17)
1949	Soviet occupation zone		
1949–1950	East Germany		

Managerial career
- 1946–1950: SG Dresden-Friedrichstadt
- 1948–1950: State of Saxony
- 1949: Soviet occupation zone
- 1949–1950: East Germany
- 1950: Hertha BSC
- 1951–1952: SV Wiesbaden
- 1952–1956: Saarland
- 1956–1964: West Germany (assistant coach)
- 1964–1978: West Germany
Medal record
Men's football
Representing West Germany (as manager)
FIFA World Cup
Winner	1974 West Germany
Runner-up	1966 England
Third place	1970 Mexico
European Championship
Winner	1972 Belgium
Runner-up	1976 Yugoslavia
- * Club domestic league appearances and goals

Helmut Schön (15 September 1915 – 23 February 1996) was a German football player and manager. He is best remembered for his exceptional career as manager of the West Germany national team in four consecutive World Cup tournaments, including winning the title in 1974, losing in the final in 1966, and coming in third in 1970. In addition, his teams won the European Championship in 1972 and lost in the final in 1976.

== Biography ==
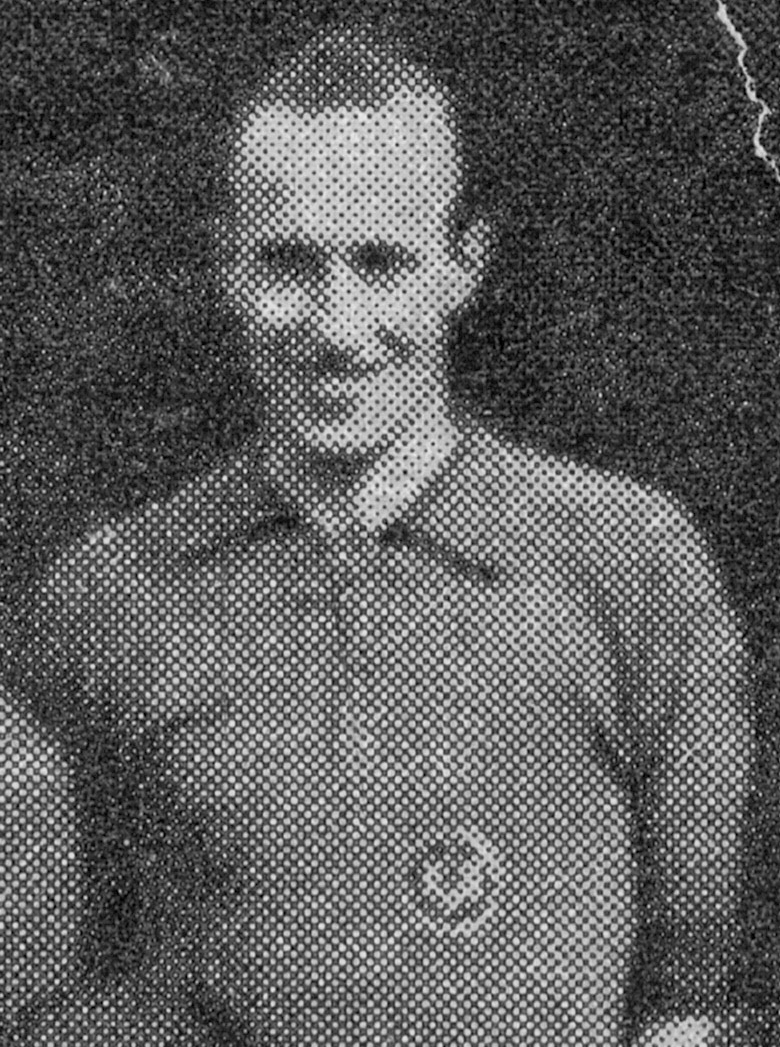
Schön with Dresdner SC c. 1938

Born on 15 September 1915, in Dresden, Schön played as a striker for Dresdner SC, winning the German football championship in 1943 and 1944 as well as the Cup in 1940 and 1941. He appeared 16 times for his country between 1937 and 1941, scoring 17 goals.

After World War II, he began his career in football management in his native state of Saxony, then part of Soviet-occupied East Germany. He was in charge of coaching selections from Saxony and the Soviet occupation zone before political interference to the sport made him flee to West Germany in 1950. Having played in Hamburg for FC St. Pauli even during his Friedrichstadt spell, he now was appointed player-coach with Hertha BSC Berlin, where he had several former teammates in his squad, but left before the end of the season. Schön became a licensed coach in Cologne before managing SV Wiesbaden. Between 1952 and 1956, he was in charge of the then-independent Saarland side, who met West Germany in qualification for the 1954 FIFA World Cup. When the Saarland was reunified with West Germany in 1956, Schön joined the West Germany national side as assistant to Sepp Herberger, whom he succeeded as manager in November 1964.

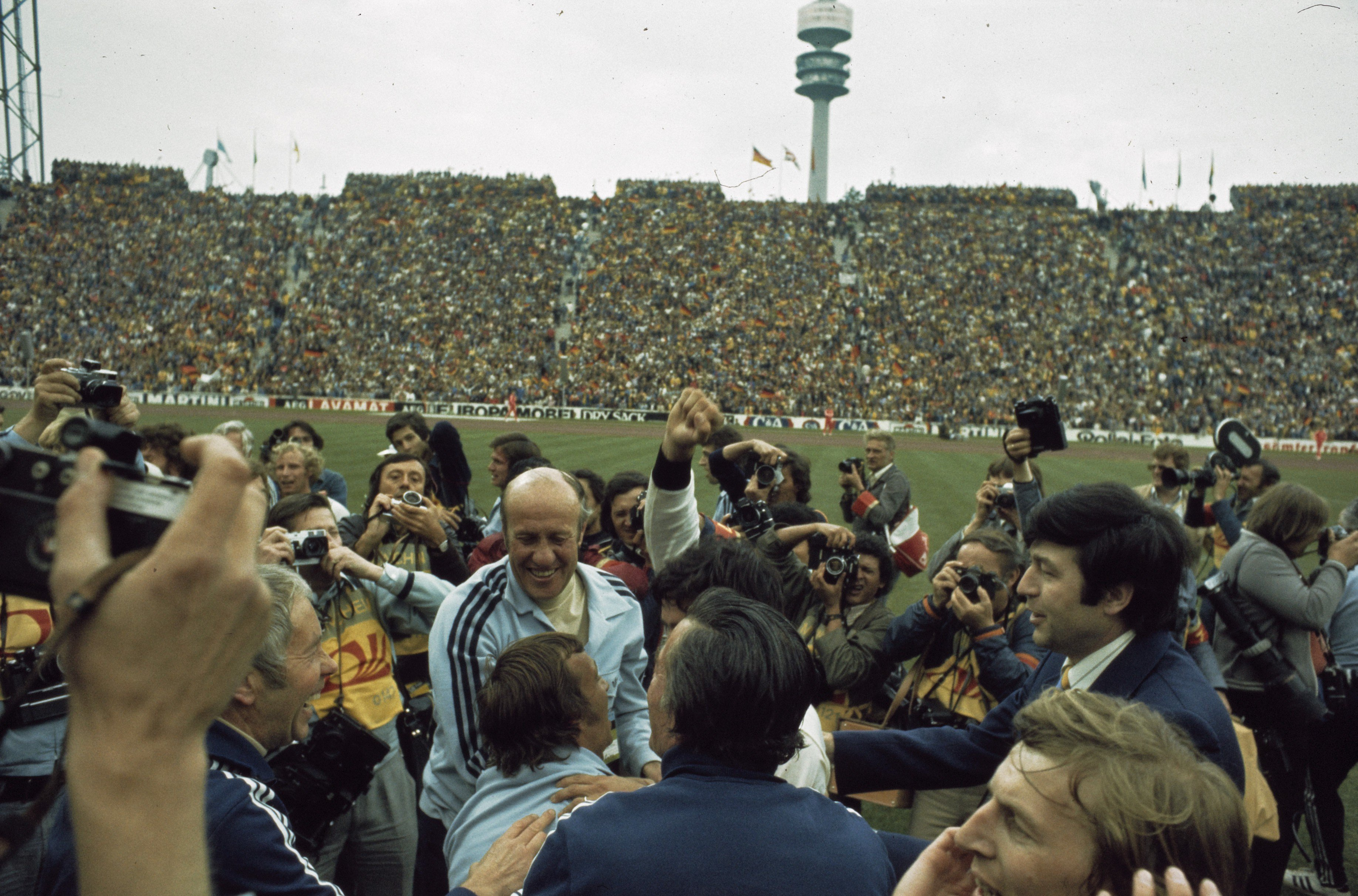
Schön and members of his coaching staff celebrate after winning the 1974 World Cup

Under Schön's leadership the West German teams were World Cup runners-up in 1966 (lost 4–2 to England in the final), third in the World Cup of 1970, European champions in 1972 (defeated the Soviet Union 3–0 in the final), World Cup winners in 1974 (defeated the Netherlands 2–1 in the final), and European Championship runners-up in 1976 (lost to Czechoslovakia in the final on penalty kicks, after extra-time). Among the moves Schön made that enabled West Germany's triumphs in 1972 and 1974 were: selecting Sepp Maier as his automatic first string goalkeeper, a decision that seems obvious in retrospect but was not a given at the time; easing many of the veterans of the 1970 team out of the subsequent squad; allowing Franz Beckenbauer to play his preferred role as a sweeper, and appointing him team captain; introducing young fullbacks Berti Vogts and Paul Breitner into the team; building the midfield around Günter Netzer and switching the team's formation to better accommodate his skills; then replacing Netzer with Wolfgang Overath in the 1974 team.

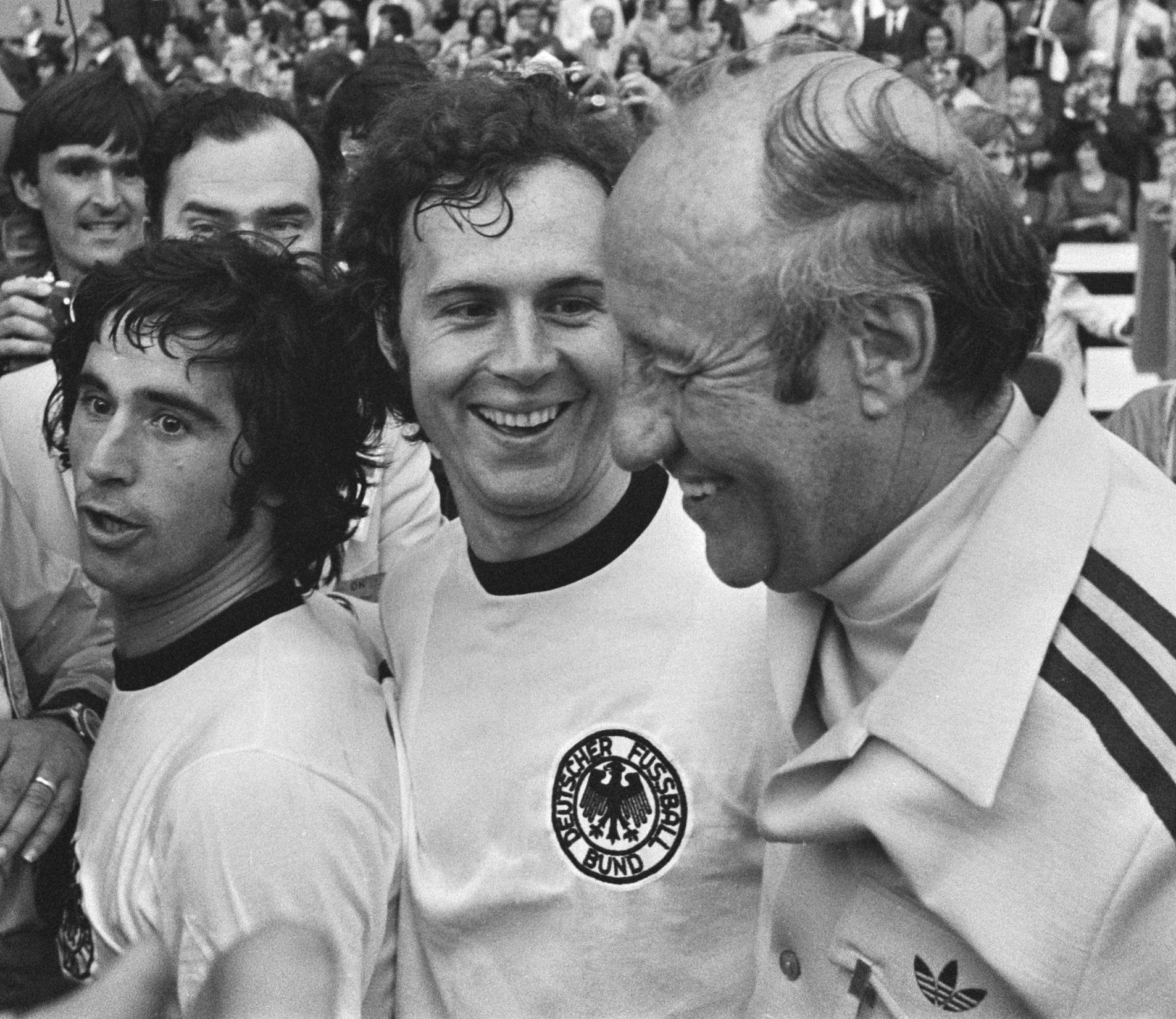
Schön alongside Müller and Beckenbauer after winning the 1974 World Cup

Schön formerly held the World Cup records for the most matches managed (25) and most matches won (20) until 2026, and was the first coach to win both a World Cup and a European Championship. He shares with England's Sir Walter Winterbottom and France's Didier Deschamps the distinction of managing the same national team at four consecutive World Cup tournaments. Schön gave notice that he would retire after the 1978 World Cup, to be replaced by his assistant Jupp Derwall. He was unable to go out on a high note as his team was knocked out of the competition by Austria, who had already been eliminated. During his 14-year tenure as national coach, his record was 87 victories, 30 draws and 22 defeats in 139 matches. For his contributions to association football as a coach, Schön became one of the inaugural recipients of the FIFA Order of Merit in 1984.

He died on 23 February 1996, in Wiesbaden, aged 80.

== Honours ==
=== Playing honours ===
Dresdner SC

- German football championship: 1943, 1944
- Tschammer-Pokal: 1940, 1941

=== Managerial honours ===
West Germany

- FIFA World Cup: 1974; runner-up: 1966; third-place: 1970
- UEFA European Championship: 1972; runner-up: 1976

Individual

- World Soccer 22nd Greatest Manager of All Time: 2013

== See also ==
- National team managers with 100 or more matches
