= Dresdner SC =

- Full name: Dresdner Sportclub 1898 e. V.
- Nickname: The Friedrichstädter (The Friedrichtowners)
- Founded: 18 March 1874; 152 years ago as Dresden English Football Club; 30 April 1898; 128 years ago as Dresdner SC
- Ground: Heinz-Steyer-Stadion, Dresden
- Capacity: 5,000
- Chairman: Günther Rettich
- League: Landesklasse Sachsen-Ost (VII)
- 2021–22: 6th
- Website: https://dresdner-sc.de/
Home colours	Away colours

Dresdner Sportclub 1898 e.V., known simply as Dresdner SC, is a German multisport club playing in Dresden, Saxony. Founded on 30 April 1898, the club was a founding member of the German Football Association (Deutscher Fussball Bund) in 1900. The origins of the club go back still further to the predecessor side Dresden English Football Club formed in 1874 by expatriate Englishmen as Germany's first football club and possibly the earliest in continental Europe: Dresdener SC was organized by one-time German members of the EFC.

== History ==
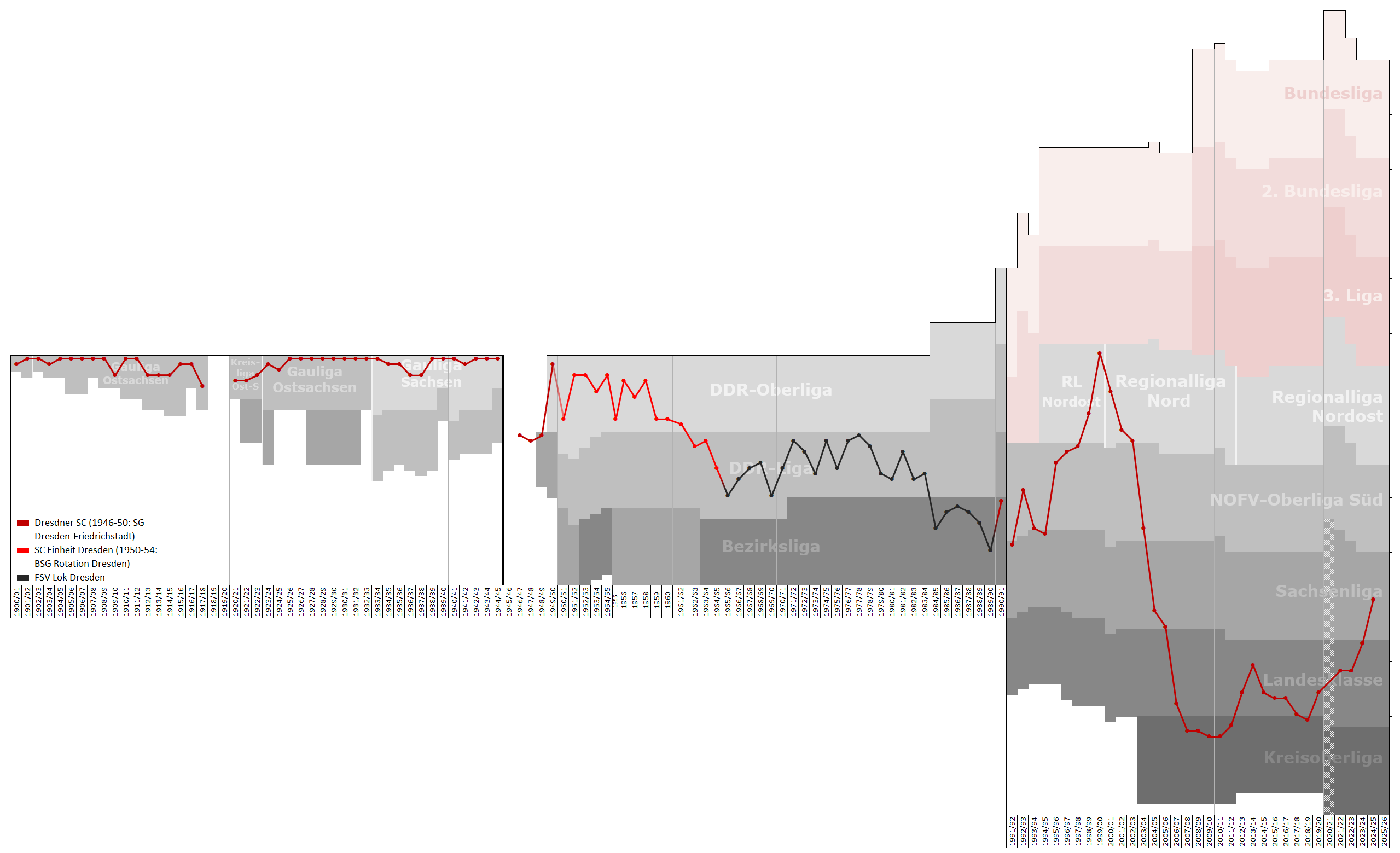
Historical chart of the club's league performance

On 30 April 1898, former members of the Dresden English Football Club and of the Neue Dresdner FC (founded in 1893 by former DEFC members and now SpVgg Dresden-Löbtau 1893) founded the Dresdner Sport-Club. Until sports historian Andreas Wittner uncovered the earlier history of the DFC, it was thought to have been founded only in 1890. Early on, DSC made regular appearances in regional finals and captured several titles. They were a dominant side in the Mitteldeutsche Verbandsliga: from 1925 to 1930 they lost only two of the ninety games they played.

=== The 30s and 40s ===
Dresdner's performance slipped for a time, but the club re-emerged as a strong side in the Gauliga Sachsen, one of sixteen top flight divisions established in the re-organization of German football under the Third Reich. They captured the Tschammerpokal – the predecessor of today's German Cup in 1940 and 1941, and followed up with national titles in 1943 and 1944. The club won all 23 games they played during the 1942/43 season, scoring 152 goals and conceding only 16. Their 4:0 win over Luftwaffen SV Hamburg in Berlin's Olympiastadion made them the last holders of the Viktoria trophy, symbolic of German football supremacy since it was first awarded to VfB Leipzig in 1903. That trophy was secreted by a Dresden supporter to a bank safe deposit box in what would become East Germany and remained hidden away for decades before finally being returned to the German Football Association (Deutscher Fussball Bund or German Football Association).

=== Post World War II ===
Dresdner SC previous crest.

After World War II, all existing sports clubs and other organizations were banned by the Allied occupation authorities in an attempt to create a disconnect from the recent Nazi past. In early 1946, the club was re-constituted as SG Friedrichstadt and then slipped into oblivion after a fateful appearance in the 1950 East German final. That match, against Soviet-sponsored ZSG Horch Zwickau, would be the end of the side which was regarded as being too bourgeois by the communist authorities. ZSG Horch Zwickau played a viciously physical game and, abetted by the referee who refused the homeside substitutions and eventually reduced SG Friedrichstadt to an 8-man squad, "won" the match 5:1. Unhappy Dresden spectators invaded the field several times, and at game's end, badly beat a player of ZSG Horch Zwickau. Mounted police were called in to restore order. Within weeks, orders came to dismantle the club and send the players to BSG VVB Tabak Dresden. Most of the players instead fled to the west to play for Hertha BSC. What happened to SG Friedrichstadt would become commonplace in East Germany as highly placed politicians or bureaucrats manipulated clubs for their own purposes.

=== Dissolution ===
At this point the history of the club becomes quite convoluted, with a number of sides laying claim to some part of the heritage of Dresdner SC:

- BSG VVB Tabak Dresden was a descendant of Dresdner SV 1910 which had taken in the players of the local sides of Striesen, Blasewitz, Tolkewitz und Laubegast at the behest of the Nazi sport authorities in 1933. The side was re-formed as SG Striesen after the war in 1945 and played as ZSG Nagema Dresden in 1948 and 1949. The side then became Tabak, where the players of SG Friedrichstadt were officially delegated after the farce of the 1950 final against ZSG Horch Zwickau. However, most players refused the delegation and joined Hertha BSC instead. The club SG Dresden Striesen emerged from BSG Tabak Dresden in June 1991.
- The remaining players of SG Friedrichsstadt joined SG Mickten in 1950. SG Mickten was joined with BSG Sachsenverlag Dresden in the same year. BSG Sachsenverlag Dresden became BSG Rotation Dresden in 1951. The football team of BSG Rotation Dresden joined sports club SC Einheit Dresden in 1954. The football team of SC Einheit Dresden played in the DDR-Oberliga until 1963. The team won the FDGB-Pokal in 1958. The football department of SC Einheit Dresden was separated from the sports club and reorganized as FSV Lokomotive Dresden in 1966. A new Dresdner SC 1898 was founded on 31 March 1990 after Die Wende. Dresdner SC was then joined by sports club SC Einheit Dresden on 19 April 1990 and FSV Lokomotive Dresden on 1 July 1990.
- Another thread of the current incarnation of Dresdner SC can be traced back to the Gauliga side Dresdner Sportfreunde, itself built out of the forced pre-war merger of a number of local sides. After World War II, that club was re-formed as SG Pieschen and then went through its own confusing series of unions with other clubs during the 50s. In 1966, the football side of the club emerged as FSV Lokomotiv Dresden.
- Local side SV Deutsche Volkspolizei Dresden was groomed as an ideologically safe "replacement" for the city's loss of their favoured team. The team was assembled using seventeen players delegated from eleven other teams affiliated to SV Deutsche Volkspolizei. Five players were delegated from the generally successful SV Deutsche Volkspolizei Potsdam , which was severely weakened. By the 1952–53 season the club was known as SG Dynamo Dresden and would go on to become one of East Germany's best teams. Its dominance in East German football ended with the rise of BFC Dynamo. While not as privileged as BFC Dynamo, Dynamo Dresden was declared a center of excellence in Bezirk (district) Dresden from 1968 and enjoyed the same privileges as a designated football club. The club also received considerable backing from local politicians such as Hans Modrow. The club struggled after German re-unification in 1990, but recovered themselves sufficiently to earn a place in 2. Bundesliga.

The "new" Dresdner SC was formed at the time of German re-unification, beginning play in the 1991–92 season. They reached the third-tier Regionalliga in 1998, and finished second in the 1999–2000, briefly supplanting Dynamo Dresden as the top team in the city. They were relegated in 2003, though, which prompted an insolvency and a gradual drop to the local amateur leagues. Since 2012 the club has been playing in the tier seven Landesklasse.

== Honours ==
- German Championship
  - Champions: 1943, 1944
- German Cup
  - Winners: 1940, 1941
- FDGB-Pokal
  - Winners: 1958

=== Youth ===
- East German U17 Cup: 1
  - Winners 1961
- East German U15 Championship: 1
  - Winners 1961

=== Regional ===
- Mitteldeutsche Meisterschaft
  - Winners (6): 1905, 1926, 1929, 1930, 1931, 1933
- Gauliga Sachsen
  - Winners (6): 1933–34, 1938–39, 1939–40, 1940–41, 1942–43, 1943–44

== Famous players ==
Helmut Schön played for Dresdner/Friedrichstadt and would go on to become one of West Germany's most exceptional managers and, in an historical aside, also coached Saarland's World Cup side in 1954.

Richard Hofmann, nicknamed "King Richard", scored 24 goals in 25 games for the Germany national team from 1927 to 1933 He also was one of the integral players in the DSC's cup and championship wins, but was never considered for the national team after 1933 for political reasons.

=== DSC-Players who played for the Germany national team ===
Name	Games	Goals	Years
Richard Hofmann	25	24	1927–33
Helmut Schön	16	19	1937–41
Willibald Kreß	16	0	1929–34
Georg Köhler	5	0	1925–28
Hugo Mantel	5	0	1927–33
Walter Dzur	3	0	1940–41
Helmut Schubert	3	0	1941
Richard Gedlich	2	0	1926–27
Friedrich Müller	2	0	1931
Herbert Pohl	2	0	1941
Martin Haftmann	1	0	1927
Arno Neumann	1	0	1908
Karl Schlösser	1	1	1931
Kurt Stössel	1	0	1931

=== DDR-era ===
- (East Germany) Harry Arlt
- (East Germany) Eduard Geyer
- (East Germany) Klaus Sammer

=== Modern era ===
- (Germany) Sven Benken
- (Germany) René Beuchel
- (Germany) Steffen Binke
- (Germany) Steffen Büttner
- (Germany) Andreas Diebitz
- (Germany) Ronny Ernst
- (Germany) Thomas Hoßmang
- (Croatia) Nikica Maglica
- (Germany) Rocco Milde
- (Germany) Sven Ratke
- (Germany) Heiko Scholz
- (Germany) Andreas Trautmann
- (Germany) Jens-Uwe Zöphel
