= List of DFB-Pokal winning managers =

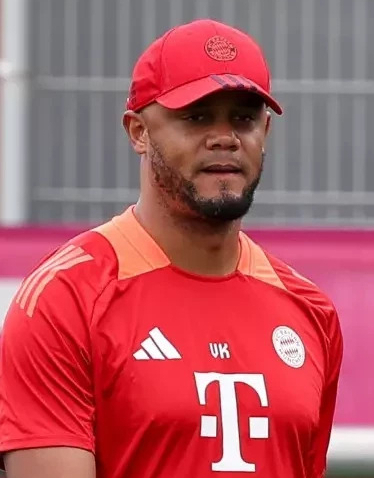
Vincent Kompany is the reigning DFB-Pokal winning manager.

The list of DFB-Pokal winning managers contains all the managers who have led their respective team to success in the DFB-Pokal. The DFB-Pokal has been played since 1952, although the Tschammerpokal, its predecessor, took place from 1935 to 1943. Since then, 58 coaches have won a cup victory. Of these, 42 are German, 4 Yugoslav, 3 Austrian and Dutch, 2 Spanish, and an Italian, Hungarian, Croatian and Belgian.

Six coaches have won the trophy three times. Hennes Weisweiler was the first to do so in 1978. The other three-time winners are Karl-Heinz Feldkamp (with three different teams), Ottmar Hitzfeld, Udo Lattek, Otto Rehhagel, and Thomas Schaaf. The most successful foreign coaches are Zlatko Čajkovski, Pep Guardiola and Huub Stevens, with two titles. Richard Michalke won the first cup competition in 1935 with 1. FC Nürnberg. The Austrian Leopold Nitsch won in 1938, making him the first foreign manager to win. In 1941, Georg Köhler became the first manager to successfully defend the title. In 2005, Felix Magath became the first coach to complete consecutive league and cup doubles. Hans Meyer is the only manager to win both the DFB-Pokal and the FDGB-Pokal, the cup competition of East Germany.

A total of seven people have won the cup as both player and manager. Ludwig Janda won as a player in 1942 with 1860 Munich and as a manager in 1956 with Karlsruher SC. Alfred Schmidt also did so while playing for Borussia Dortmund in 1965 and managing Kickers Offenbach in 1970. (Note: Though Alfred Schmidt was manager of Kickers Offenbach at the time of the 1970 DFB-Pokal final, he was not on the bench following a car accident, and was instead represented by Kurt Schreiner.) Thomas Schaaf won the DFB-Pokal with the same club, after winning as a player for Werder Bremen in 1991 and 1994, and as manager in 1999, 2004, and 2009. He is also the only person to have won the cup as both player and manager with multiple titles during his playing career. Jupp Heynckes won as a player with Borussia Mönchengladbach in 1973 and as a manager with Bayern Munich in 2013. Niko Kovač won in 2003 as a player with Bayern and in 2018 and 2019 as manager of Eintracht Frankfurt and Bayern Munich, respectively. Hansi Flick won in 1986 as a player and in 2020 as a manager, both with Bayern Munich. Xabi Alonso is the most recent manager to have achieved the feat, winning in 2016 as a player with Bayern Munich and in 2024 as manager of Bayer Leverkusen. Schaaf, Kovač and Flick are the only managers to have won titles as a player and manager with the same club, having done so for Werder Bremen, Bayern Munich and Bayern Munich, respectively. Schaaf and Kovač are also the only people to have won the cup as both player and manager with multiple titles during their managerial career.

== Winning managers ==
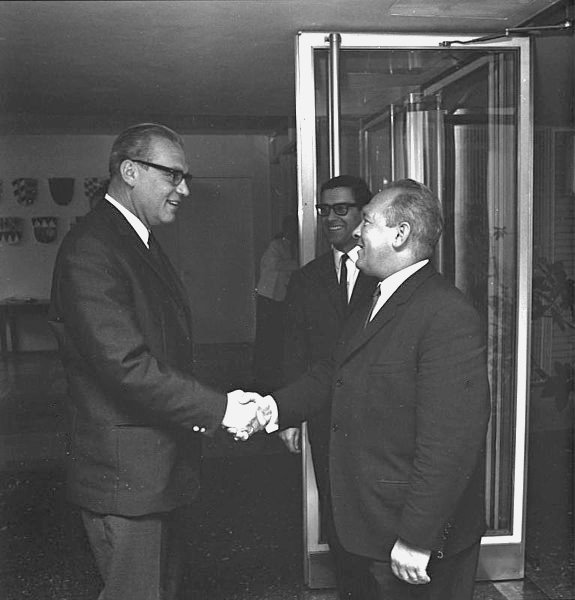
Zlatko Čajkovski (right) is the most successful foreign manager along with Huub Stevens and Pep Guardiola.

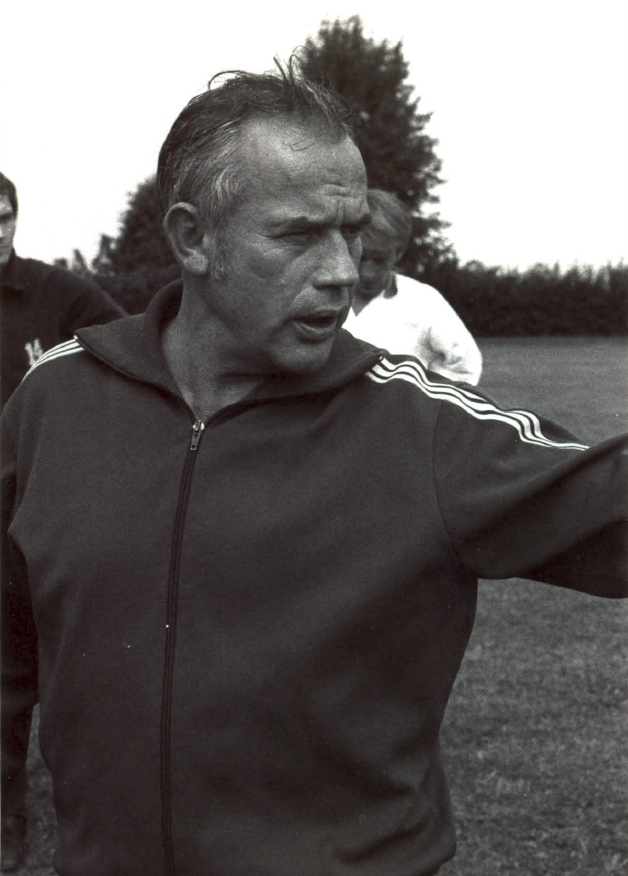
Hennes Weisweiler was the first to win the trophy three times.

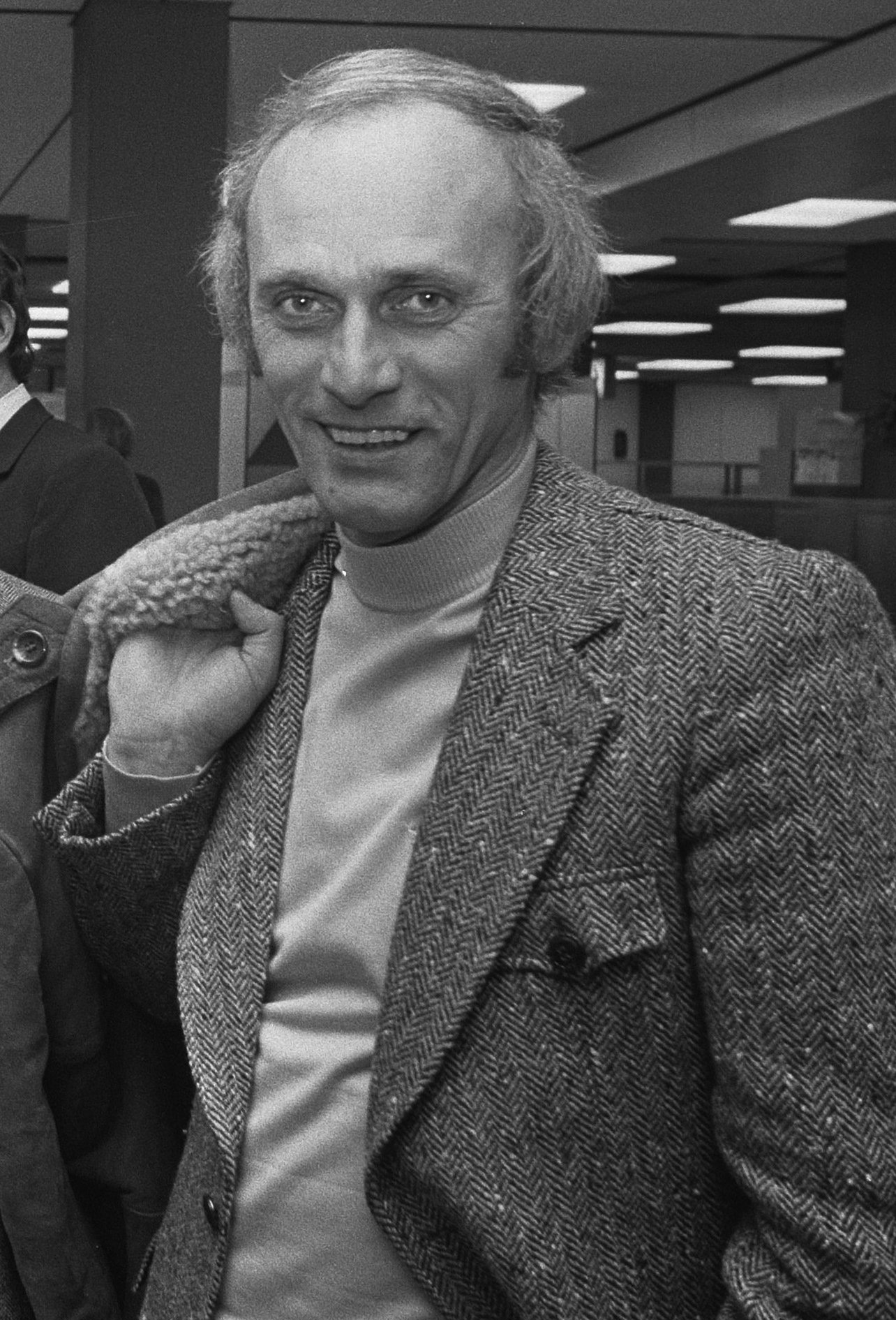
Udo Lattek won the trophy thrice with Bayern Munich.

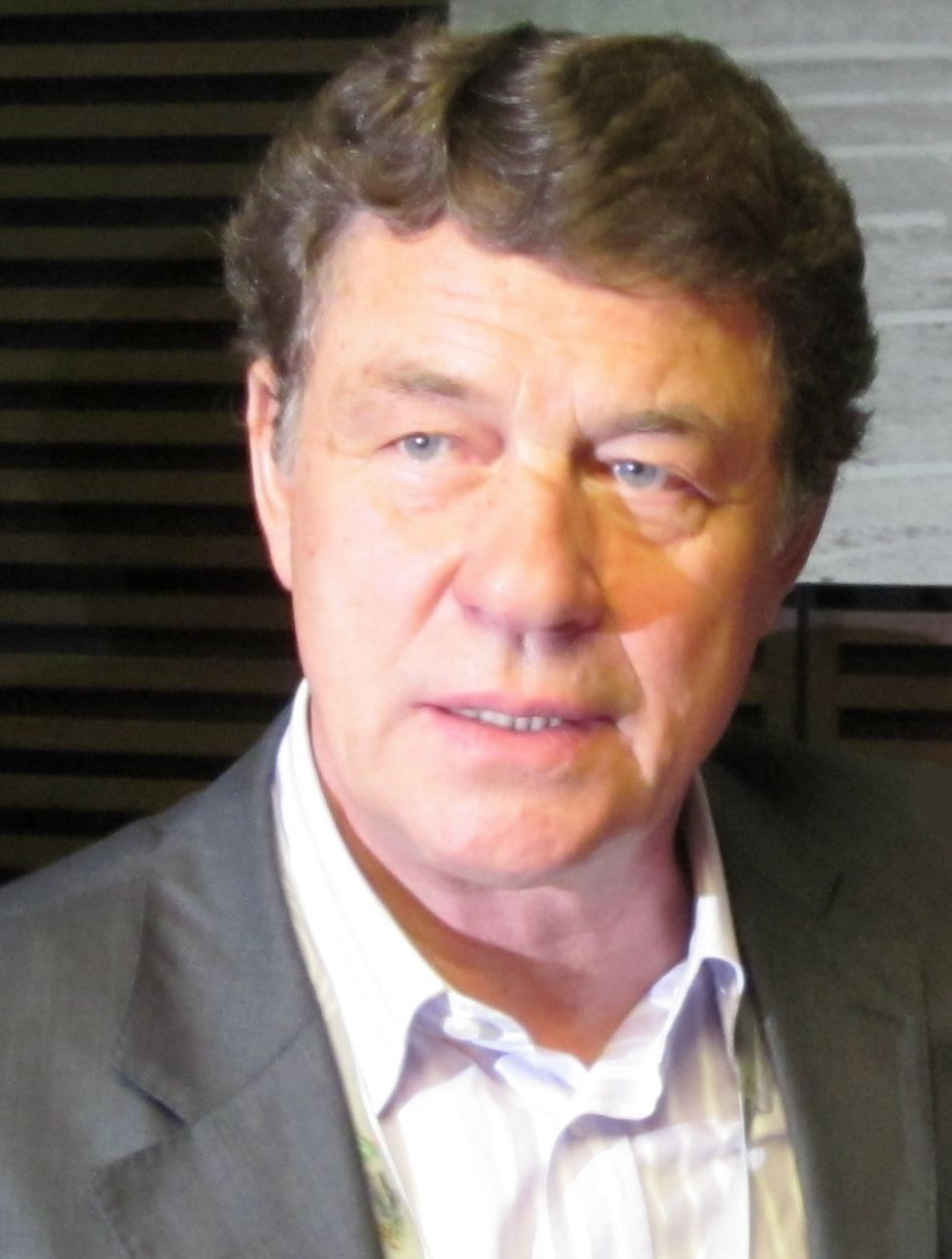
Otto Rehhagel also won the DFB-Pokal three times.

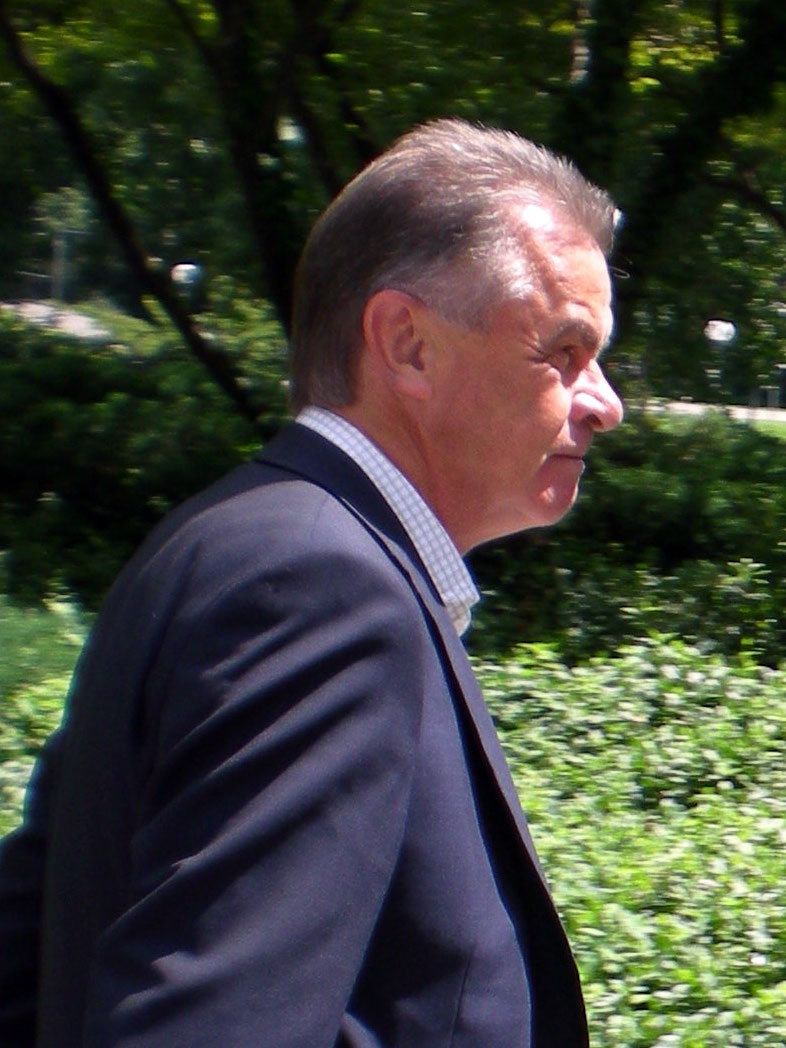
Ottmar Hitzfeld was also a three-time cup winner with Bayern Munich.

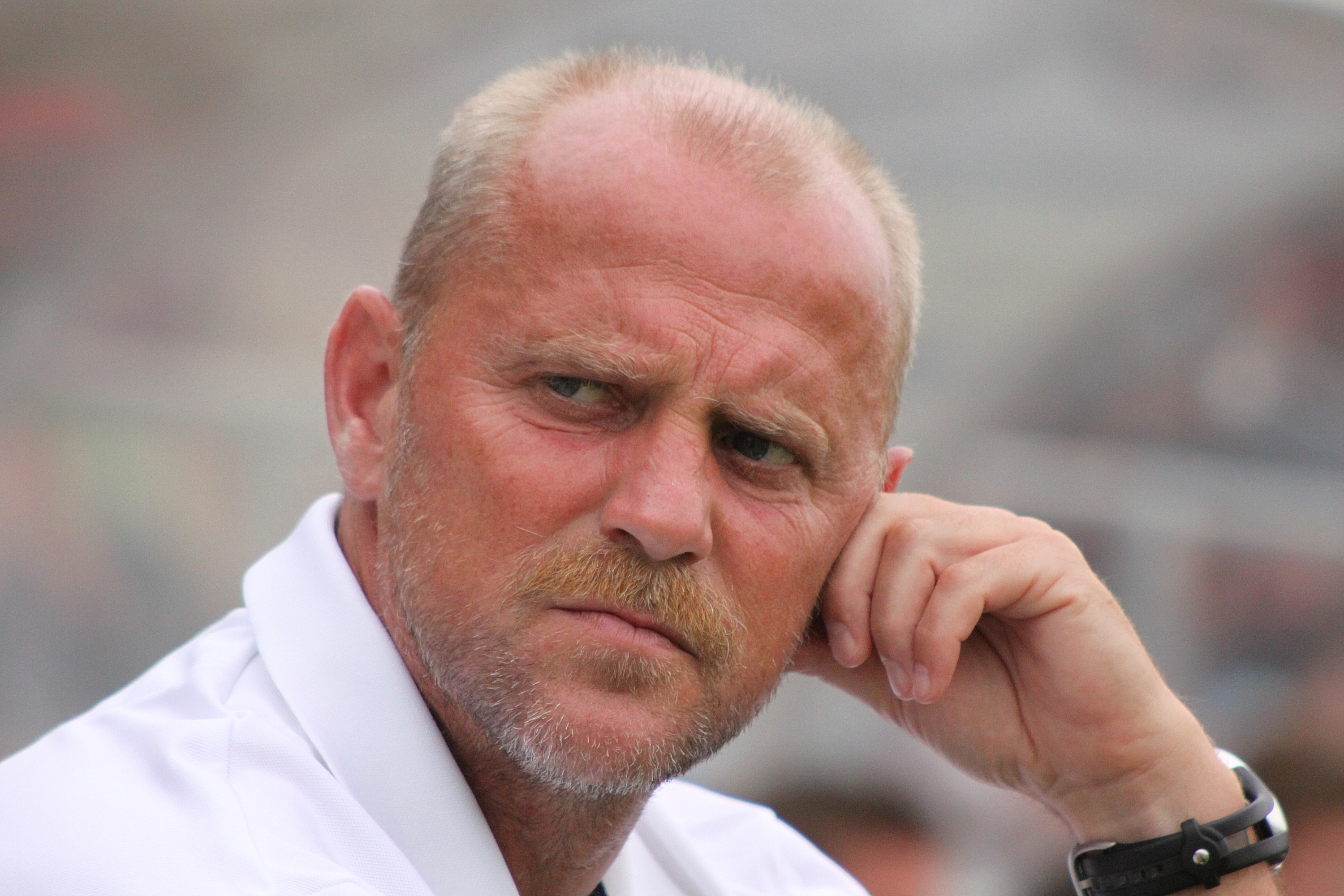
Thomas Schaaf won the cup three times with Werder Bremen

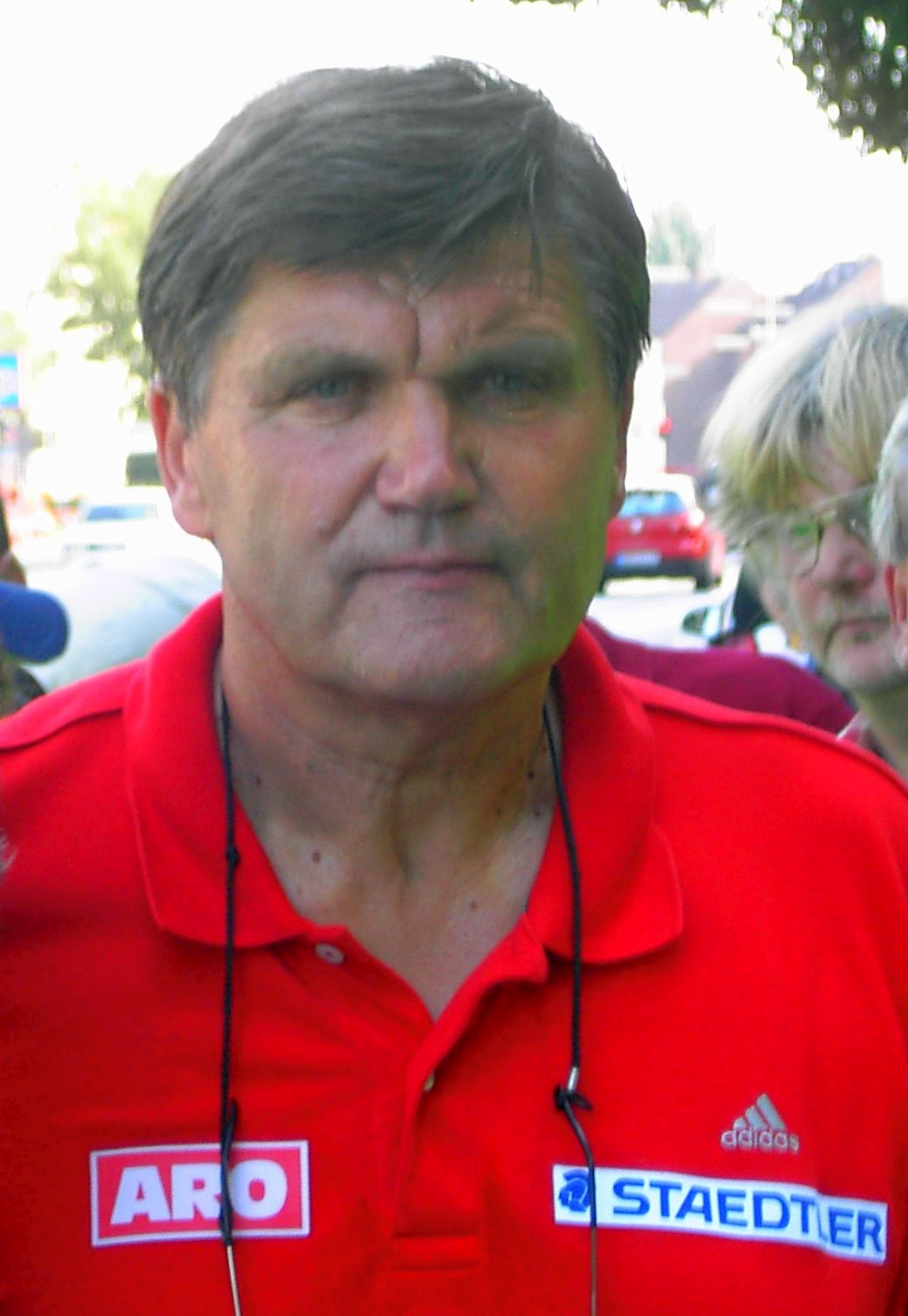
Hans Meyer became the first manager to win both the FDGB-Pokal and the DFB-Pokal.

=== Tschammerpokal ===
Year	Manager	Club
1935	(Germany) Richard Michalke	1. FC Nürnberg
1936	(Germany) Heinrich Pfaff	VfB Leipzig
1937	(Germany) Hans Schmidt	Schalke 04
1938	(Germany) Leopold Nitsch (Note: As a result of the annexation of Austria by Nazi Germany on 13 March 1938, both managers had become German citizens.)	Rapid Wien
1939	(Germany) Alwin Riemke	1. FC Nürnberg
1940	(Germany) Georg Köhler	Dresdner SC
1941	(Germany) Georg Köhler	Dresdner SC
1942	(Germany) Max Schäfer	1860 Munich
1943	(Germany) Fritz Gschweidl	First Vienna

=== DFB-Pokal ===
Season	Manager	Club
1952–53	(West Germany) Karl Hohmann	Rot-Weiss Essen
1953–54	(West Germany) Georg Wurzer	VfB Stuttgart
1954–55	(Austria) Adolf Patek	Karlsruher SC
1955–56	(West Germany) Ludwig Janda	Karlsruher SC
1956–57	(West Germany) Willibald Hahn	Bayern Munich
1957–58	(West Germany) Georg Wurzer	VfB Stuttgart
1958–59	(West Germany) Hans Wendlandt	Schwarz-Weiß Essen
1959–60	(West Germany) Bernd Oles	Borussia München Gladbach
1960–61	(West Germany) Georg Knöpfle	Werder Bremen
1961–62	(West Germany) Herbert Widmayer	1. FC Nürnberg
1962–63	(West Germany) Martin Wilke	Hamburger SV
1963–64	(Austria) Max Merkel	1860 Munich
1964–65	(West Germany) Hermann Eppenhoff	Borussia Dortmund
1965–66	(Socialist Federal Republic of Yugoslavia) Zlatko Čajkovski	Bayern Munich
1966–67	(Socialist Federal Republic of Yugoslavia) Zlatko Čajkovski	Bayern Munich
1967–68	(West Germany) Willi Multhaup	1. FC Köln
1968–69	(Socialist Federal Republic of Yugoslavia) Branko Zebec	Bayern Munich
1969–70	(West Germany) Kurt Schreiner	Kickers Offenbach
1970–71	(West Germany) Udo Lattek	Bayern Munich
1971–72	(Socialist Federal Republic of Yugoslavia) Ivica Horvat	Schalke 04
1972–73	(West Germany) Hennes Weisweiler	Borussia Mönchengladbach
1973–74	(West Germany) Dietrich Weise	Eintracht Frankfurt
1974–75	(West Germany) Dietrich Weise	Eintracht Frankfurt
1975–76	(West Germany) Kuno Klötzer	Hamburger SV
1976–77	(West Germany) Hennes Weisweiler	1. FC Köln
1977–78	(West Germany) Hennes Weisweiler	1. FC Köln
1978–79	(West Germany) Hans-Dieter Tippenhauer	Fortuna Düsseldorf
1979–80	(West Germany) Otto Rehhagel	Fortuna Düsseldorf
1980–81	(West Germany) Lothar Buchmann	Eintracht Frankfurt
1981–82	(Hungary) Pál Csernai	Bayern Munich
1982–83	(Netherlands) Rinus Michels	1. FC Köln
1983–84	(West Germany) Udo Lattek	Bayern Munich
1984–85	(West Germany) Karl-Heinz Feldkamp	Bayer Uerdingen
1985–86	(West Germany) Udo Lattek	Bayern Munich
1986–87	(Austria) Ernst Happel	Hamburger SV
1987–88	(West Germany) Karl-Heinz Feldkamp	Eintracht Frankfurt
1988–89	(West Germany) Horst Köppel	Borussia Dortmund
1989–90	(West Germany) Karl-Heinz Feldkamp	1. FC Kaiserslautern
1990–91	(Germany) Otto Rehhagel	Werder Bremen
1991–92	(Germany) Michael Lorkowski	Hannover 96
1992–93	(Federal Republic of Yugoslavia) Dragoslav Stepanović	Bayer Leverkusen
1993–94	(Germany) Otto Rehhagel	Werder Bremen
1994–95	(Germany) Bernd Krauss	Borussia Mönchengladbach
1995–96	(Germany) Eckhard Krautzun	1. FC Kaiserslautern
1996–97	(Germany) Joachim Löw	VfB Stuttgart
1997–98	(Italy) Giovanni Trapattoni	Bayern Munich
1998–99	(Germany) Thomas Schaaf	Werder Bremen
1999–2000	(Germany) Ottmar Hitzfeld	Bayern Munich
2000–01	(Netherlands) Huub Stevens	Schalke 04
2001–02	(Netherlands) Huub Stevens	Schalke 04
2002–03	(Germany) Ottmar Hitzfeld	Bayern Munich
2003–04	(Germany) Thomas Schaaf	Werder Bremen
2004–05	(Germany) Felix Magath	Bayern Munich
2005–06	(Germany) Felix Magath	Bayern Munich
2006–07	(Germany) Hans Meyer	1. FC Nürnberg
2007–08	(Germany) Ottmar Hitzfeld	Bayern Munich
2008–09	(Germany) Thomas Schaaf	Werder Bremen
2009–10	(Netherlands) Louis van Gaal	Bayern Munich
2010–11	(Germany) Ralf Rangnick	Schalke 04
2011–12	(Germany) Jürgen Klopp	Borussia Dortmund
2012–13	(Germany) Jupp Heynckes	Bayern Munich
2013–14	(Spain) Pep Guardiola	Bayern Munich
2014–15	(Germany) Dieter Hecking	VfL Wolfsburg
2015–16	(Spain) Pep Guardiola	Bayern Munich
2016–17	(Germany) Thomas Tuchel	Borussia Dortmund
2017–18	(Croatia) Niko Kovač	Eintracht Frankfurt
2018–19	(Croatia) Niko Kovač	Bayern Munich
2019–20	(Germany) Hansi Flick	Bayern Munich
2020–21	(Germany) Edin Terzić	Borussia Dortmund
2021–22	(Italy) Domenico Tedesco	RB Leipzig
2022–23	(Germany) Marco Rose	RB Leipzig
2023–24	(Spain) Xabi Alonso	Bayer Leverkusen
2024–25	(Germany) Sebastian Hoeneß	VfB Stuttgart
2025–26	(Belgium) Vincent Kompany	Bayern Munich

== Ranking ==
=== By individual ===
Rank	Manager	Titles	Years
1	(West Germany) Karl-Heinz Feldkamp	3	1985, 1988, 1990
1	(Germany) Ottmar Hitzfeld	3	2000, 2003, 2008
1	(West Germany) Udo Lattek	3	1971, 1984, 1986
1	(Germany) Otto Rehhagel	3	1980, 1991, 1994
1	(Germany) Thomas Schaaf	3	1999, 2004, 2009
1	(West Germany) Hennes Weisweiler	3	1973, 1977, 1978
7	(Socialist Federal Republic of Yugoslavia) Zlatko Čajkovski	2	1966, 1967
7	(Spain) Pep Guardiola	2	2014, 2016
7	(Germany) Georg Köhler	2	1940, 1941
7	(Croatia) Niko Kovač	2	2018, 2019
7	(Germany) Felix Magath	2	2005, 2006
7	(Netherlands) Huub Stevens	2	2001, 2002
7	(West Germany) Dietrich Weise	2	1974, 1975
7	(West Germany) Georg Wurzer	2	1954, 1958

=== By nationality ===
Rank	Country	Titles
1	Germany	63
2	Yugoslavia / FR Yugoslavia	5
3	Austria	4
4	Netherlands	3
4	Spain	3
6	Croatia	2
6	Italy	2
8	Belgium	1
8	Hungary	1

== See also ==
- DFB-Pokal
- List of Bundesliga managers
