= List of Karlsruher SC players =

Karlsruher SC is a German football club based in Karlsruhe, Baden-Württemberg.

The following list contains all the footballers that have made over 100 league appearances for the club since the merger of VfB Mühlburg and Karlsruher FC Phönix in 1952.

== Players ==
Name	Nationality	Position	Club career	Appearances	Goals	Notes
Godfried Aduobe	Ghana	MF	2004–2011	162	2	
Walter Baureis	Germany	DF	1953–1959	167	0	
Heinz Beck	Germany	FW	1952–1961	161	117	
Edmund Becker	Germany	DF	1977–1986	158	19	
Gerd Becker	Germany	FW	1969–1973	133	43	
Manfred Bender	Germany	MF	1992–1996, 1999–2000	103	29	
Srećko Bogdan	Croatia	DF	1985–1993	245	21	
Max Fischer	Germany	DF	1952–1956	104	0	(Note: Player made additional appearances for VfB Mühlburg prior to the formation of Karlsruher SC)
Rudi Fischer	Germany	GK	1952–1960	246	0	
Emanuel Günther	Germany	FW	1977–1978, 1979–1987	310	135	
Michael Harforth	Germany	MF	1977–1980, 1981–1982, 1983–1992	347	36	
Ernst Kunkel	Germany	FW	1952–1960	159	85	
Josef Marx	Germany	MF	1961–1969	227	22	
Gunther Metz	Germany	DF	1987–1999	286	5	
Burkhard Reich	Germany	DF	1991–1999	214	15	
Heinz Ruppenstein	Germany	MF	1955–1964	215	29	
Lars Schmidt	Germany	DF	1985–1995	265	5	
Rainer Schütterle	Germany	MF	1985–1987, 1989–1994, 1999–2000	233	60	
Kurt Sommerlatt	Germany	FW	1952–1957	166	41	(Note: Player made additional appearances for Karlsruher FC Phönix prior to the formation of Karlsruher SC)
Oswald Traub	Germany	FW	1952–1959	148	38	
Wilfried Trenkel	Germany	MF	1972–1983	310	31	
Werner Roth	Germany	MF	1952–1959	156	10	
Rainer Ulrich	Germany	DF	1971–1982	338	2	
Jürgen Weidlandt	Germany	DF	1966–1972	195	10	
Martin Wiesner	Germany	MF	1977–1983	160	18	
Horst Wild	Germany	FW	1962–1967, 1968–1974	292	105	
Rudolf Wimmer	Germany	GK	1969–1983	432	0	
Reinhold Wischnowsky	Germany	MF	1959–1966	147	33	
Gustav Witlatschil	Germany	MF	1953–1966	219	38	
Michael Wittwer	Germany	DF	1987–2000	147	1	
Klaus Zaczyk	Germany	MF	1963–1968	104	11	
