= 1955 DFB-Pokal final =

- Event: 1954–55 DFB-Pokal
Karlsruher SC	Schalke 04
3	2
- Date: 21 May 1955
- Venue: Eintracht-Stadion, Braunschweig
- Referee: Werner Treichel (West Berlin)
- Attendance: 25,000

The 1955 DFB-Pokal final decided the winner of the 1954–55 DFB-Pokal, the 12th season of Germany's knockout football cup competition. It was played on 21 May 1955 at the Eintracht-Stadion in Braunschweig. Karlsruher SC won the match 3–2 against Schalke 04, to claim their 1st cup title.

== Route to the final ==
The DFB-Pokal began with 32 teams in a single-elimination knockout cup competition. There were a total of four rounds leading up to the final. Teams were drawn against each other, and the winner after 90 minutes would advance. If still tied, 30 minutes of extra time was played. If the score was still level, a replay would take place at the original away team's stadium. If still level after 90 minutes, 30 minutes of extra time was played. If the score was still level, a drawing of lots would decide who would advance to the next round.

Note: In all results below, the score of the finalist is given first (H: home; A: away).

Karlsruher SC		Round	Schalke 04
Opponent	Result	1954–55 DFB-Pokal	Opponent	Result
FSV Frankfurt (H)	5–1	Round 1	Jahn Regensburg (H) (A)	1–1 (a.e.t.); 6–3 (replay)
1. FC Nürnberg (H)	1–0	Round of 16	1. FC Schweinfurt 05 (H); (A)	1–1 (a.e.t.); 1–0 (replay)
VfB Stuttgart (A)	5–2	Quarter-finals	TuS Bremerhaven (H)	2–0
Altonaer FC 93 (A) (H)	3–3 (a.e.t.); 3–0 (replay)	Semi-finals	Kickers Offenbach (H)	2–1

== Match ==
=== Details ===
21 May 1955

Karlsruher SC	3–2	Schalke 04
Kunkel 20'; Sommerlatt 83'; Traub 86'	Report	Sadlowski 44', 70'

Eintracht-Stadion, Braunschweig
Attendance: 25,000
Referee: Werner Treichel (West Berlin)

Karlsruher SC	Schalke 04

GK	1	(West Germany) Rudi Fischer
RB		(West Germany) Max Fischer
LB		(West Germany) Walter Baureis
RH		(West Germany) Werner Roth
CH		(West Germany) Siegfried Geesemann
LH		(West Germany) Herbert Dannenmeier
OR		(West Germany) Oswald Traub
IR		(West Germany) Kurt Sommerlatt
CF		(Luxembourg) Antoine Kohn
IL		(West Germany) Ernst Kunkel
OL		(West Germany) Hans Strittmatter
Manager:
(Austria) Adolf Patek

GK	1	(West Germany) Manfred Orzessek
RB		(West Germany) Werner Garten
LB		(West Germany) Günter Brocker
RH		(West Germany) Hermann Eppenhoff
CH		(West Germany) Walter Zwickhöfer
LH		(West Germany) Erwin Harkener
OR		(West Germany) Bernhard Klodt
IR		(West Germany) Otto Laszig
CF		(West Germany) Helmut Sadlowski
IL		(West Germany) Manfred Piontek
OL		(West Germany) Hans Krämer
Manager:
(Austria) Eduard Frühwirth

Match rules

- 90 minutes.
- 30 minutes of extra time if necessary.
- Replay if scores still level.
- No substitutions.
