= 2018 DFB-Pokal final =

- Match programme cover
- Event: 2017–18 DFB-Pokal
Bayern Munich	Eintracht Frankfurt
1	3
- Date: 19 May 2018
- Venue: Olympiastadion, Berlin
- Man of the Match: Ante Rebić (Eintracht Frankfurt)
- Referee: Felix Zwayer (Berlin)
- Attendance: 74,322
- Weather: Clear; 20 °C (68 °F); 35% humidity

The 2018 DFB-Pokal final decided the winner of the 2017–18 DFB-Pokal, the 75th season of the annual German football cup competition. The match was played on 19 May 2018 at the Olympiastadion in Berlin.

The final featured Bayern Munich, the record winners of the competition, and Eintracht Frankfurt, the runners-up of the previous season, making it a rematch of the 2006 final. Eintracht Frankfurt won the match 3–1 to claim their fifth cup title.

As winners, Frankfurt earned the right to host the 2018 edition of the DFL-Supercup at the start of the following season, facing the champions of the 2017–18 edition of the Bundesliga, Bayern Munich. Frankfurt also earned automatic qualification for the group stage of the 2018–19 edition of the UEFA Europa League.

== Background ==
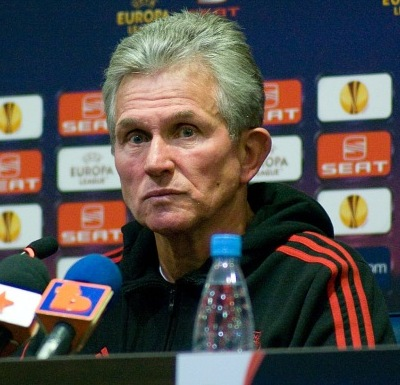
Bayern manager Jupp Heynckes had won the DFB-Pokal twice as a player and coach

The match was the 22nd final for Bayern Munich, a competition record. Of the previous finals, Bayern had won on 18 occasions, also a competition record, and lost three times. Bayern's last final appearance was in 2016, where they won on penalties against Borussia Dortmund. Bayern were chasing a league and cup double, having won the 2017–18 Bundesliga in April 2018. Bayern had previously completed the double on 11 occasions (in 2013 as part of a treble), a record in Germany, most recently in 2016.

The final was the fifth for Bayern coach Jupp Heynckes as a player and manager, having come out of retirement in October 2017 following the sacking of Carlo Ancelotti. Heynckes won the final in 1973 as a player with Borussia Mönchengladbach, before losing his next two finals as a manager in 1984 (with Gladbach) and 2012 (with Bayern). Heynckes then won the 2013 final before retiring, securing the treble for Bayern, the first ever in German football. The final was the last match for Heynckes as a manager, with Frankfurt's Niko Kovač taking over Bayern for the 2018–19 season. Heynckes previously managed Frankfurt during the 1994–95 season, but is not remembered well at the club after being sacked nine months into his tenure following a poor campaign.

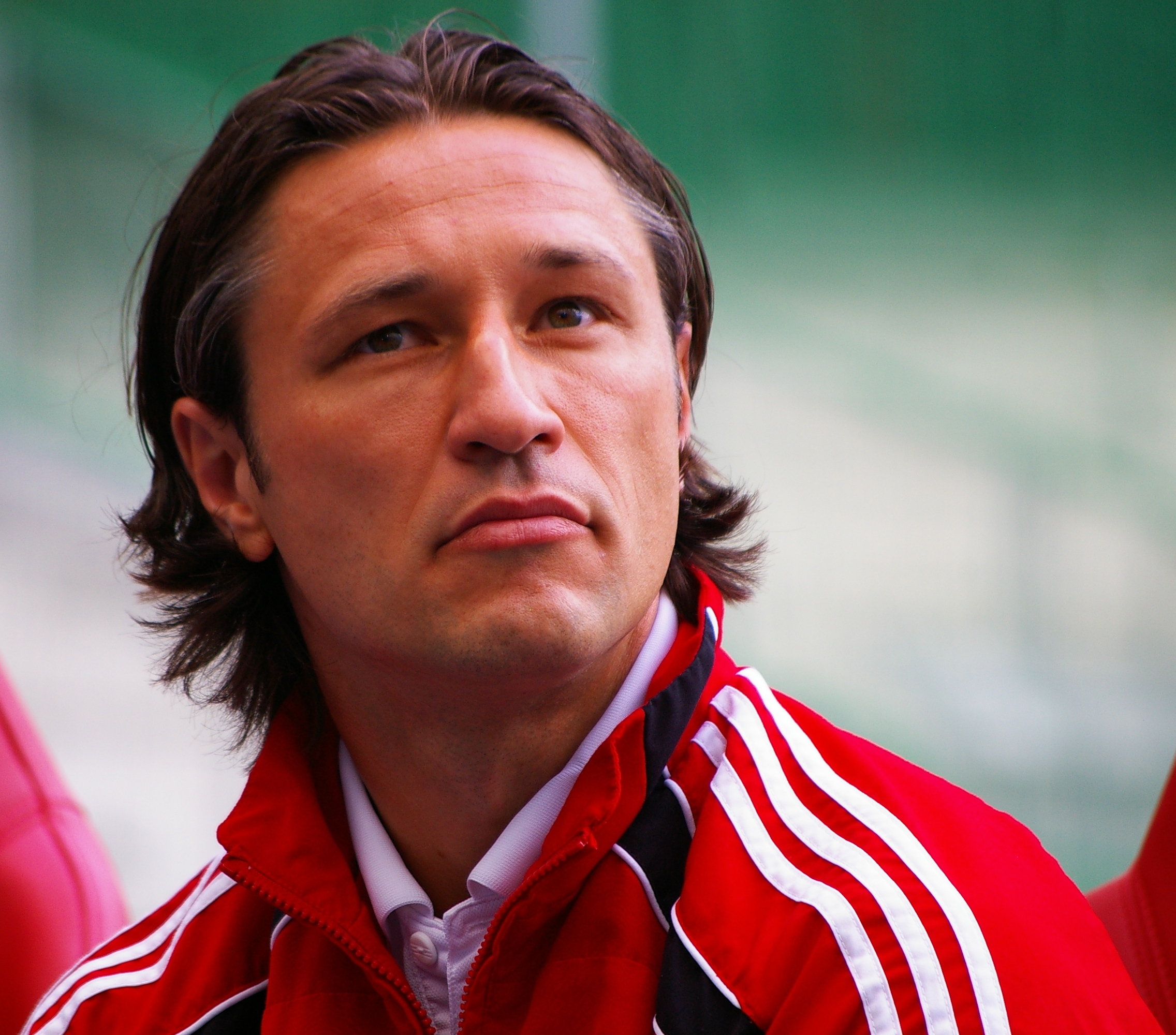
Frankfurt manager Niko Kovač reached a second consecutive final in his last season with the club

The match was the 8th final for Eintracht Frankfurt, with a record of four wins and three losses prior. Frankfurt last won the competition in 1988, the last major title for the club at the time, winning 1–0 against VfL Bochum. This was the second time Frankfurt have managed to reach consecutive finals, having previously done so in 1975. In the previous final, Frankfurt lost 1–2 to Borussia Dortmund.

The final was the second consecutive for Croatian manager Niko Kovač in his second full season with Frankfurt, previously accomplished by Dietrich Weise in 1975. Kovač took over as manager of Eintracht Frankfurt in March 2016, where he managed to keep Die Adler in the Bundesliga after winning the relegation play-offs against 1. FC Nürnberg. The match was the last for Kovač with Frankfurt, against his future employers Bayern Munich, where he took over as coach for the following season after signing a three-year contract. A win would also see Kovač become the fifth person to win the DFB-Pokal as a player and manager, having won the 2003 final as a player with Bayern, previously accomplished by Ludwig Janda (player in 1942 with 1860 Munich, manager in 1956 with Karlsruher SC), Alfred Schmidt (player in 1965 with Borussia Dortmund, manager in 1970 with Kickers Offenbach), Thomas Schaaf (player in 1991 and 1994, manager in 1999, 2004 and 2009, all with Werder Bremen) and Jupp Heynckes (player in 1973 with Borussia Mönchengladbach, manager in 2013 with Bayern Munich).

The final was the 138th match between Bayern and Frankfurt, with a record of 68 Bayern wins, 39 Frankfurt wins, and 30 draws prior. Of the prior matches, four had been in the DFB-Pokal, with Bayern winning thrice and Frankfurt winning once. This included the 2006 final, where Bayern won 1–0 via a goal from Claudio Pizarro, making the match the 8th final pairing to be repeated (on 11 occasions). Their most recent cup meeting was in the round of 16 of the 2009–10 season, where Bayern won 4–0. The sides met twice during season prior to the final, with Bayern winning both by a score of 1–0 away in the first meeting on 9 December 2017 and 4–1 at home in the second meeting on 28 April 2018.

== Route to the final ==
The DFB-Pokal began with 64 teams in a single-elimination knockout cup competition. There were a total of five rounds leading up to the final. Teams were drawn against each other, and the winner after 90 minutes advanced. If still tied, 30 minutes of extra time were played. If the score was still level, a penalty shoot-out was used to determine the winner.

Note: In all results below, the score of the finalist is given first (H: home; A: away).

Bayern Munich		Round	Eintracht Frankfurt	
Opponent	Result	2017–18 DFB-Pokal	Opponent	Result
Chemnitzer FC (A)	5–0	First round	TuS Erndtebrück (A)	3–0
RB Leipzig (A)	1–1 (a.e.t.) (5–4 p)	Second round	Schweinfurt 05 (A)	4–0
Borussia Dortmund (H)	2–1	Round of 16	1. FC Heidenheim (A)	2–1 (a.e.t.)
SC Paderborn (A)	6–0	Quarter-finals	Mainz 05 (H)	3–0
Bayer Leverkusen (A)	6–2	Semi-finals	Schalke 04 (A)	1–0

=== Bayern Munich ===
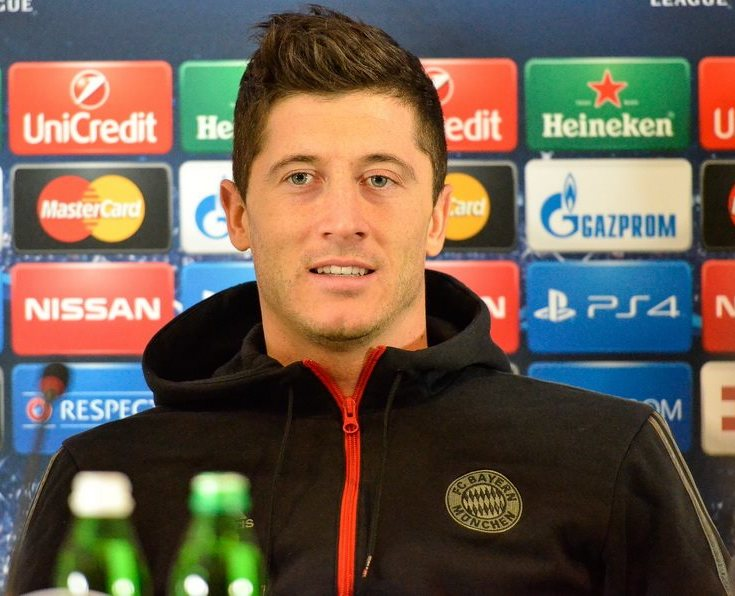
Bayern's Robert Lewandowski was the top scorer of the DFB-Pokal heading into the final with 5 goals

In the first round of the cup, Bayern faced third-division side Chemnitzer FC away. Robert Lewandowski opened the scoring for Bayern in the 20th minute, before Kingsley Coman scored the second in the 51st minute. Lewandowski completed a brace in the 60th minute, before Franck Ribéry scored the fourth for Bayern in the 79th minute. Defender Mats Hummels scored shortly before the end to seal the 5–0 win. In the second round, Bayern traveled to face RB Leipzig, the runners-up of the previous Bundesliga season. After going a man down with Naby Keïta sent off, Leipzig were awarded a penalty after Jérôme Boateng fouled Yussuf Poulsen in the box. Emil Forsberg converted the penalty past Sven Ulreich to give Leipzig the lead in the 68th minute. However, five minutes later Bayern equalised through a header by Thiago. After a goalless period of extra time, the match went to a penalty shoot-out. After the first nine penalties were all successful, Ulreich saved Timo Werner's shot to send Bayern through to the next round.

In the round of 16, Bayern were drawn at home against cup holders and fellow Bundesliga side Borussia Dortmund, who had knocked Bayern out in the semi-finals of the previous season. Boateng opened the scoring with a header in the 12th minute, before Thomas Müller doubled the lead for Bayern in the 40th minute. Andriy Yarmolenko reduced Dortmund's deficit with a goal in the 77th minute, but Bayern held on with a 2–1 win to advance. In the quarter-finals, Die Roten faced third-division side SC Paderborn away. Coman opened the scoring in the 19th minute, before Lewandowski increased Bayern's lead six minutes later. Joshua Kimmich scored the third for Bayern in the 42nd minute, with Corentin Tolisso adding to the scoring with a header in the 55th minute. Arjen Robben scored a late brace for Bayern to secure the 6–0 win.

In the semi-finals, Bayern were drawn away to fellow Bundesliga side Bayer Leverkusen. Bayern began quickly, with Lewandowski completing a brace with goals in the 3rd and 9th minute. Lars Bender reduced the deficit for Leverkusen with a header seven minutes later. In the second half, Müller increased Bayern's lead with a 52nd minute strike. Thiago scored the fourth for Bayern in the 60th minute, before Müller completed a brace four minutes later. Leon Bailey got a goal back for Leverkusen in the 72nd minute, before Müller completed his hat-trick six minutes later to seal the 6–2 win, sending Bayern to the final.

=== Eintracht Frankfurt ===
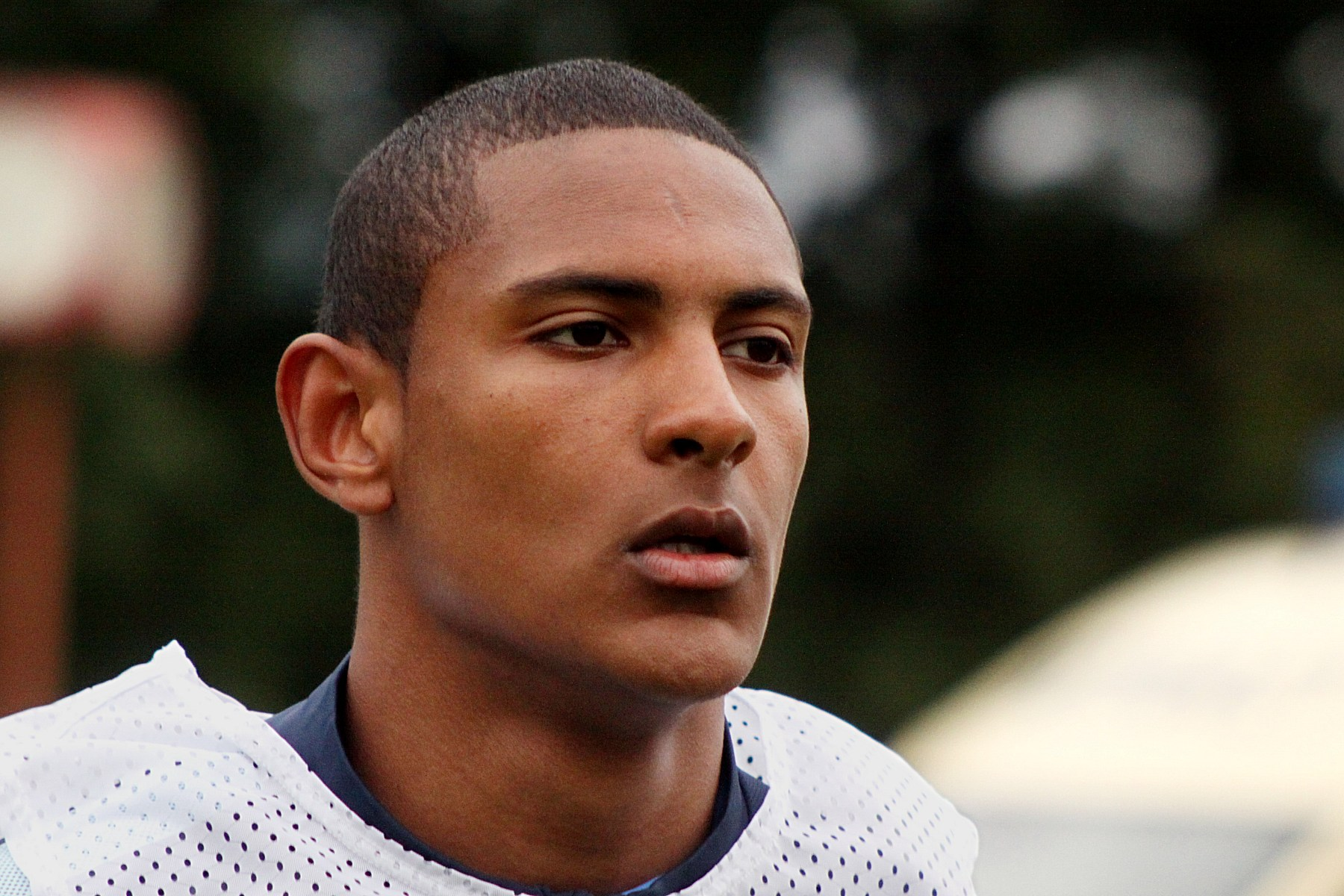
Sébastien Haller is Frankfurt's top scorer in the DFB-Pokal heading into the final with 4 goals

In the first round, Eintracht Frankfurt were drawn away to fourth-division side TuS Erndtebrück. Frankfurt were a man down after David Abraham was sent off in the 23rd minute, but they took the lead 12 minutes later via a goal from Timothy Chandler. In the 72nd minute, Mijat Gaćinović doubled the lead for Eintracht, before Sébastien Haller scored three minutes later to secure the 3–0 win. In the second round, Frankfurt were drawn away against fourth-division side Schweinfurt 05. Haller opened the scoring for Frankfurt in the 14th minute, before completing a brace with a 58th minute strike. Marius Wolf extended the lead five minutes later, before Danny Blum sealed the 4–0 win for Frankfurt in the 85th minute.

Frankfurt were drawn away to 1. FC Heidenheim in the round of 16. After a goalless 90 minutes, Gaćinović put Frankfurt ahead in the 95th minute of extra time. However, Marc Schnatterer equalised for the hosts a minute later. In the 109th minute, Haller restored Frankfurt's lead, with the 2–1 win enough to see Frankfurt advance. In the quarter-finals, Eintracht were drawn at home against Mainz 05. Ante Rebić put Frankfurt ahead after 17 minutes, before an own goal from Alexander Hack saw the lead double for the hosts. Omar Mascarell increased Frankfurt's lead with a 62nd-minute goal, securing the 3–0 win.

In the semi-finals, Frankfurt were drawn away to Schalke 04. After a goalless first half, Frankfurt took the lead in the 75th minute via a backheel from Luka Jović. Despite a red card from Gelson Fernandes in the 81st minute, Frankfurt managed to hold on for the 1–0 win and spot in the final.

== Match ==
=== Summary ===
Robert Lewandowski came close to putting Bayern ahead after eight minutes, with his free kick hitting the underside of the crossbar. Three minutes later, Ante Rebić dispossessed James Rodríguez, and put the ball past Sven Ulreich after a one-two with Kevin-Prince Boateng to give Frankfurt the lead going into half-time. Eight minutes into the second half, Lewandowski equalised for Bayern, finishing the cut-back from Joshua Kimmich, which took a slight deflection off Omar Mascarell. Eintracht regained the lead in the 82nd minute after Rebić completed his brace, getting past Mats Hummels and Niklas Süle to lift the ball over Ulreich. In the sixth minute of second-half stoppage time, Mijat Gaćinović sealed the victory for Eintracht, putting the ball into an empty net after Ulreich had come forward for a corner in the final moments.

=== Details ===
19 May 2018
20:00 CEST

Bayern Munich	1–3	Eintracht Frankfurt
Lewandowski 53'	Report	Rebić 11', 82'; Gaćinović 90+6'

Olympiastadion, Berlin
Attendance: 74,322
Referee: Felix Zwayer (Berlin)

Bayern Munich	Eintracht Frankfurt

GK	26	(Germany) Sven Ulreich
RB	32	(Germany) Joshua Kimmich
CB	4	(Germany) Niklas Süle
CB	5	(Germany) Mats Hummels
LB	27	(Austria) David Alaba
DM	8	(Spain) Javi Martínez
CM	11	(Colombia) James Rodríguez
CM	6	(Spain) Thiago		(substituted off) 64'
RF	25	(Germany) Thomas Müller (c)		(substituted off) 70'
CF	9	(Poland) Robert Lewandowski	(yellow card) 37'
LF	7	(France) Franck Ribéry		(substituted off) 87'
Substitutes:
GK	1	(Germany) Manuel Neuer
DF	13	(Brazil) Rafinha
DF	14	(Spain) Juan Bernat
MF	19	(Germany) Sebastian Rudy
MF	24	(France) Corentin Tolisso		(substituted on) 64'
MF	29	(France) Kingsley Coman	(yellow card) 87'	(substituted on) 70'
FW	2	(Germany) Sandro Wagner		(substituted on) 87'
Manager:
(Germany) Jupp Heynckes

GK	1	(Finland) Lukáš Hrádecký
RB	24	(Germany) Danny da Costa
CB	19	(Argentina) David Abraham (c)
CB	13	(Mexico) Carlos Salcedo	(yellow card) 7'
LB	15	(Netherlands) Jetro Willems	(yellow card) 45+2'
DM	20	(Japan) Makoto Hasebe	(yellow card) 45+1'
CM	39	(Spain) Omar Mascarell
CM	6	(Netherlands) Jonathan de Guzmán		(substituted off) 74'
RW	27	(Germany) Marius Wolf		(substituted off) 60'
LW	4	(Croatia) Ante Rebić	(yellow card) 84'	(substituted off) 89'
CF	17	(Ghana) Kevin-Prince Boateng
Substitutes:
GK	37	(Germany) Jan Zimmermann
DF	23	(Germany) Marco Russ		(substituted on) 74'
DF	33	(Israel) Taleb Tawatha
MF	10	(Mexico) Marco Fabián
MF	11	(Serbia) Mijat Gaćinović		(substituted on) 60'
FW	8	(Serbia) Luka Jović
FW	9	(France) Sébastien Haller		(substituted on) 89'
Manager:
(Croatia) Niko Kovač

Man of the Match:
Ante Rebić (Eintracht Frankfurt)

Assistant referees:
Thorsten Schiffner (Konstanz)
Markus Häcker (Waren)
Fourth official:
Patrick Ittrich (Hamburg)
Video assistant referee:
Bastian Dankert (Rostock)
Assistant video assistant referee:
René Rohde (Rostock)

Match rules

- 90 minutes.
- 30 minutes of extra time if necessary.
- Penalty shoot-out if scores still level.
- Seven named substitutes.
- Maximum of three substitutions, with a fourth allowed in extra time.

=== Statistics ===
Statistic	Bayern Munich	Eintracht Frankfurt
Goals scored	1	3
Total shots	22	8
Shots on target	5	5
Saves	2	4
Ball possession	77%	23%
Corner kicks	8	6
Fouls committed	9	21
Offsides	3	1
Yellow cards	2	4
Red cards	0	0

== See also ==
- 2018 DFL-Supercup
- Football in Berlin
