= 1956 DFB-Pokal final =

- Match programme cover
- Event: 1955–56 DFB-Pokal
Karlsruher SC	Hamburger SV
3	1
- Date: 5 August 1956
- Venue: Wildparkstadion, Karlsruhe
- Referee: Adolf Loser (Essen)
- Attendance: 25,000

The 1956 DFB-Pokal final decided the winner of the 1955–56 DFB-Pokal, the 13th season of Germany's knockout football cup competition. It was played on 5 August 1956 at the Wildparkstadion in Karlsruhe. Karlsruher SC won the match 3–1 against Hamburger SV, to claim their 2nd cup title.

== Route to the final ==
The DFB-Pokal began with 5 teams in a single-elimination knockout cup competition. There were a total of two rounds leading up to the final. In the qualification round, all but two teams were given a bye. Teams were drawn against each other, and the winner after 90 minutes would advance. If still tied, 30 minutes of extra time was played. If the score was still level, a replay would take place at the original away team's stadium. If still level after 90 minutes, 30 minutes of extra time was played. If the score was still level, a drawing of lots would decide who would advance to the next round.

Note: In all results below, the score of the finalist is given first (H: home; A: away).

Karlsruher SC		Round	Hamburger SV
Opponent	Result	1955–56 DFB-Pokal	Opponent	Result
FK Pirmasens (A)	5–1	Semi-finals	Fortuna Düsseldorf (A)	2–1

== Match ==
=== Details ===
5 August 1956

Karlsruher SC	3–1	Hamburger SV
Termath 40', 63'; Kohn 87'	Report	Seeler 16'

Wildparkstadion, Karlsruhe
Attendance: 25,000
Referee: Adolf Loser (Essen)

Karlsruher SC	Hamburger SV

GK	1	(West Germany) Rudi Fischer
RB		(West Germany) Werner Hesse
LB		(West Germany) Walter Baureis (c)
RH		(West Germany) Heinz Ruppenstein
CH		(West Germany) Siegfried Geesemann
LH		(West Germany) Gerhard Siedl
OR		(West Germany) Oswald Traub
IR		(West Germany) Kurt Sommerlatt
CF		(Luxembourg) Antoine Kohn
IL		(West Germany) Heinz Beck
OL		(West Germany) Bernhard Termath
Manager:
(West Germany) Ludwig Janda

GK	1	(West Germany) Horst Schnoor
RB		(West Germany) Franz Klepatz
LB		(West Germany) Walter Schemel
RH		(West Germany) Jochenfritz Meinke
CH		(West Germany) Josef Posipal (c)
LH		(West Germany) Heinz Liese
OR		(West Germany) Gerhard Krug
IR		(West Germany) Klaus Stürmer
CF		(West Germany) Uwe Seeler
IL		(West Germany) Günter Schlegel
OL		(West Germany) Uwe Reuter
Managers:
(West Germany) Günter Mahlmann (West Germany) Martin Wilke

Match rules

- 90 minutes.
- 30 minutes of extra time if necessary.
- Replay if scores still level.
- No substitutions.
