= List of Bundesliga managers =

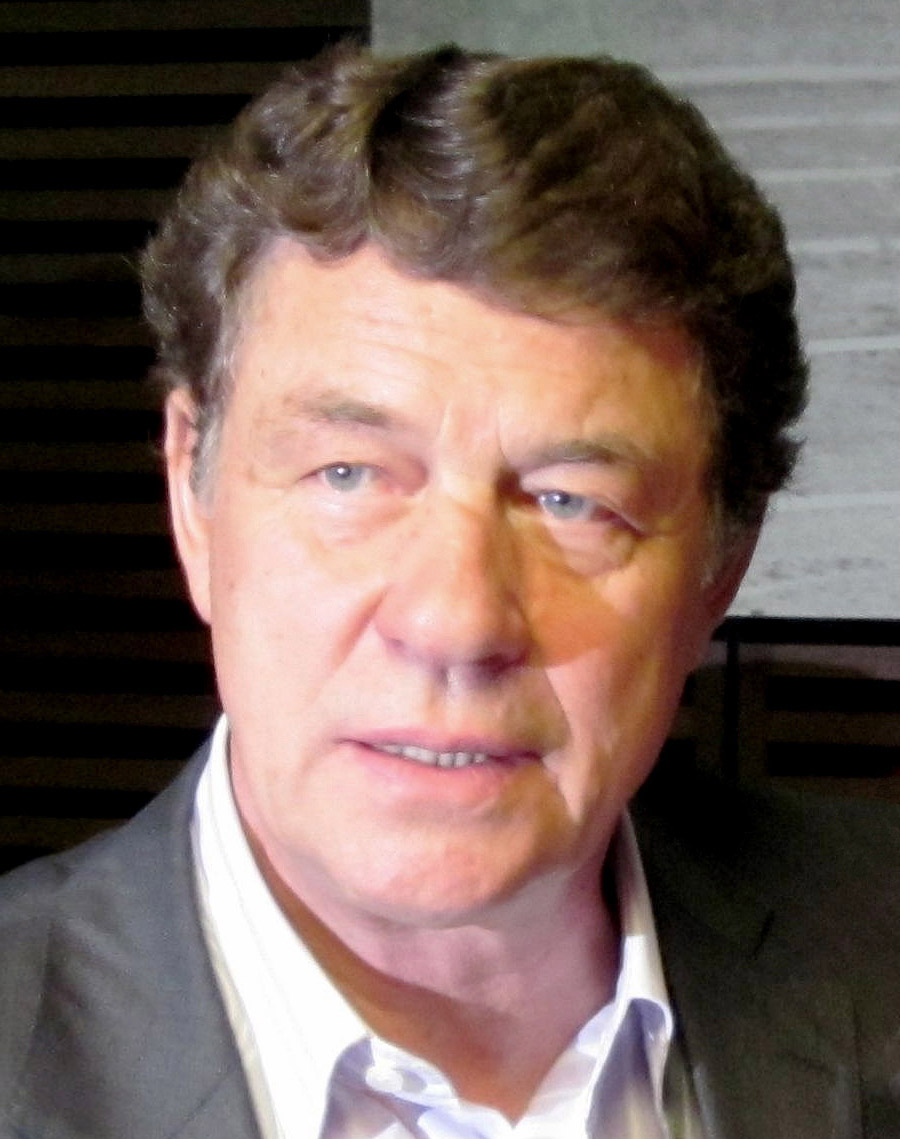
Otto Rehhagel has managed the most Bundesliga games.

These are lists of Bundesliga managers who have taken charge of the most matches or have won a title in this league, which is the top level of the German football league system and started in 1963.

== Most Bundesliga games managed ==
- First / Last = year of first / last Bundesliga game managed
- Seasons (S): number of Bundesliga seasons managed

Managers are sorted by number of games, then by year of first game.
Current Bundesliga managers and their current clubs are shown in bold.

As of 15 September 2026

| Rank | Manager | Nat. | Games | First | Last | S | Club(s) |
|---|---|---|---|---|---|---|---|
| 1 | Otto Rehhagel | (Germany) | 836 | 1974 | 2012 | 28 | Bremen 493, K'lautern 109, Dortmund 68, Offenbach 57, Düsseldorf 41, Bayern 30, Bielefeld 26, Hertha 12 |
| 2 | Jupp Heynckes | (Germany) | 669 | 1979 | 2018 | 23 | M'gladbach 291, Bayern 248, Leverkusen 68, Schalke 38, Frankfurt 24 |
| 3 | Erich Ribbeck | (Germany) | 569 | 1968 | 1996 | 19 | K'lautern 170, Frankfurt 170, Leverkusen 140, Bayern 65, Dortmund 24 |
| 4 | Thomas Schaaf | (Germany) | 525 | 1999 | 2021 | 18 | Bremen 480, Frankfurt 34, Hannover 11 |
| 5 | Udo Lattek | (Germany) | 522 | 1970 | 2000 | 19 | Bayern 299, M'gladbach 136, Dortmund 69, Schalke 17, Köln 1 |
| 6 | Friedhelm Funkel | (Germany) | 518 | 1991 | 2021 | 19 | Frankfurt 136, Duisburg 127, Uerdingen 104, Düsseldorf 53, Rostock 43, Köln 28, Hertha 27 |
| 7 | Felix Magath | (Germany) | 503 | 1995 | 2022 | 18 | Wolfsburg 118, Stuttgart 114, Bayern 87, Schalke 60, Hamburg 58, Frankfurt 36, Bremen 22, Hertha 8 |
| 8 | Hennes Weisweiler | (Germany) | 470 | 1965 | 1980 | 14 | M'gladbach 340, Köln 130 |
| 9 | Ottmar Hitzfeld | (Germany) | 461 | 1991 | 2008 | 14 | Bayern 253, Dortmund 208 |
| 10 | Dieter Hecking | (Germany) | 452 | 2006 | 2026 | 15 | Wolfsburg 135, Nürnberg 102, Hannover 101, M'gladbach 86, Bochum 25, Aachen 3 |
| 11 | Christoph Daum | (Germany) | 426 | 1986 | 2011 | 15 | Köln 163, Leverkusen 144, Stuttgart 112, Frankfurt 7 |
| 12 | Karl-Heinz Feldkamp | (Germany) | 414 | 1978 | 1992 | 14 | K'lautern 220, Uerdingen 102, Frankfurt 42, Dortmund 26, Bielefeld 24 |
| 13 | Branko Zebec | (Socialist Federal Republic of Yugoslavia) | 413 | 1968 | 1983 | 14 | Braunschweig 136, Hamburg 85, Stuttgart 62, Bayern 58, Frankfurt 38, Dortmund 34 |
| 14 | Heinz Höher | (Germany) | 396 | 1972 | 1988 | 13 | Bochum 238, Nürnberg 119, Duisburg 21, Düsseldorf 18 |
| 15 | Christian Streich | (Germany) | 391 | 2012 | 2024 | 12 | Freiburg 391 |
| 16 | Huub Stevens | (Netherlands) | 388 | 1996 | 2020 | 17 | Schalke 249, Hamburg 49, Hertha 48, Stuttgart 32, Hoffenheim 10 |
| 17 | Winfried Schäfer | (Germany) | 386 | 1987 | 1998 | 12 | Karlsruhe 371, Stuttgart 15 |
| 18 | Dietrich Weise | (Germany) | 370 | 1969 | 1986 | 13 | Frankfurt 208, K'lautern 94, Düsseldorf 68 |
| 19 | Rolf Schafstall | (Germany) | 351 | 1976 | 2001 | 14 | Bochum 190, Schalke 52, Uerdingen 49, Duisburg 44, Düsseldorf 16 |
| 20 | Helmuth Johannsen | (Germany) | 347 | 1963 | 1981 | 11 | Braunschweig 230, Bochum 68, Hannover 49 |
| 20 | Gyula Lóránt | (Hungary) | 347 | 1965 | 1979 | 12 | K'lautern 125, Offenbach 62, Frankfurt 38, Bayern 34, Duisburg 34, Schalke 28, Köln 26 |
| 22 | Volker Finke | (Germany) | 343 | 1993 | 2011 | 11 | Freiburg 340, Köln 3 |
| 23 | Jürgen Klopp | (Germany) | 340 | 2004 | 2015 | 10 | Dortmund 238, Mainz 102 |
| 24 | Jörg Berger | (Germany) | 326 | 1981 | 2009 | 17 | Frankfurt 100, Schalke 99, Köln 49, Düsseldorf 44, Rostock 21, Karlsruhe 7, Hannover 5, Bielefeld 1 |
| 25 | Lucien Favre | (Switzerland) | 307 | 2007 | 2020 | 12 | M'gladbach 153, Dortmund 79, Hertha 75 |
| 26 | Armin Veh | (Germany) | 304 | 2002 | 2016 | 13 | Stuttgart 108, Frankfurt 93, Rostock 58, Hamburg 26, Wolfsburg 19 |
| 27 | Helmut Kronsbein | (Germany) | 298 | 1964 | 1980 | 10 | Hertha 212, Hannover 86 |
| 28 | Ralf Rangnick | (Germany) | 294 | 1999 | 2019 | 12 | Hoffenheim 85, Stuttgart 61, Hannover 57, Schalke 57, Leipzig 34 |
| 29 | Kuno Klötzer | (Germany) | 286 | 1966 | 1982 | 11 | Hamburg 136, Hertha 78, Düsseldorf 34, Duisburg 19, Offenbach 13, Nürnberg 6 |
| 30 | Bruno Labbadia | (Germany) | 283 | 2008 | 2023 | 14 | Stuttgart 100, Hamburg 77, Wolfsburg 45, Leverkusen 34, Hertha 27 |
| 31 | Thomas Tuchel | (Germany) | 281 | 2009 | 2024 | 9 | Mainz 170, Dortmund 68, Bayern 43 |
| 32 | Willibert Kremer | (Germany) | 279 | 1973 | 1992 | 10 | Duisburg 113, Düsseldorf 84, Leverkusen 82 |
| 33 | Hannes Bongartz | (Germany) | 269 | 1985 | 1994 | 10 | Wattenscheid 129, K'lautern 83, M'gladbach 34, Duisburg 23 |
| 34 | Horst Buhtz | (Germany) | 266 | 1964 | 1981 | 9 | Wuppertal 78, Uerdingen 68, Neunkirchen 64, Hannover 56 |
| 35 | Friedel Rausch | (Germany) | 247 | 1976 | 2001 | 11 | K'lautern 91, Schalke 65, Frankfurt 58, M'gladbach 17, Nürnberg 16 |
| 35 | Werner Lorant | (Germany) | 247 | 1994 | 2001 | 8 | 1860 Munich 247 |
| 37 | Zlatko Čajkovski | (Socialist Federal Republic of Yugoslavia) | 246 | 1965 | 1976 | 8 | Bayern 102, Köln 78, Hannover 49, Offenbach 17 |
| 38 | Hermann Eppenhoff | (Germany) | 245 | 1963 | 1974 | 8 | Stuttgart 83, Duisburg 68, Dortmund 60, Bochum 34 |
| 39 | Jürgen Röber | (Germany) | 244 | 1994 | 2007 | 10 | Hertha 157, Stuttgart 41, Wolfsburg 38, Dortmund 8 |
| 39 | Frank Pagelsdorf | (Germany) | 244 | 1995 | 2008 | 8 | Hamburg 142, Rostock 102 |
| 41 | Julian Nagelsmann | (Germany) | 243 | 2016 | 2023 | 8 | Hoffenheim 116, Leipzig 68, Bayern 59 |
| 42 | Klaus Toppmöller | (Germany) | 242 | 1993 | 2004 | 9 | Bochum 124, Leverkusen 55, Hamburg 33, Frankfurt 30 |
| 43 | Wolfgang Wolf | (Germany) | 236 | 1998 | 2006 | 8 | Wolfsburg 166, Nürnberg 49, K'lautern 21 |
| 44 | **Niko Kovač** | (Croatia) | 232 | 2016 | 2026 | 10 | Frankfurt 77, Wolfsburg 60, **Dortmund** 51, Bayern 44 |
| 45 | Ivica Horvat | (Socialist Federal Republic of Yugoslavia) | 231 | 1964 | 1979 | 9 | Schalke 157, Essen 41, Frankfurt 33 |
| 46 | Max Merkel | (Austria) | 230 | 1963 | 1982 | 8 | 1860 Munich 110, Nürnberg 78, Schalke 22, Karlsruhe 20 |
| 46 | Mirko Slomka | (Germany) | 230 | 2006 | 2014 | 9 | Hannover 135, Schalke 79, Hamburg 16 |
| 46 | Markus Weinzierl | (Germany) | 230 | 2012 | 2022 | 8 | Augsburg 173, Schalke 34, Stuttgart 23 |
| 49 | Ewald Lienen | (Germany) | 227 | 1993 | 2005 | 10 | Hannover 57, Rostock 55, Köln 53, Duisburg 45, M'gladbach 17 |
| 50 | Rudi Gutendorf | (Germany) | 225 | 1963 | 1977 | 9 | Schalke 57, Stuttgart 56, Duisburg 52, TeBe Berlin 34, Offenbach 14, Hamburg 12 |
| 51 | Peter Neururer | (Germany) | 224 | 1991 | 2006 | 10 | Bochum 102, Köln 51, Saarbrücken 34, Hannover 25, Hertha 12 |
| 52 | Dettmar Cramer | (Germany) | 220 | 1975 | 1985 | 7 | Leverkusen 102, Bayern 101, Frankfurt 17 |
| 53 | Reinhard Saftig | (Germany) | 213 | 1983 | 1993 | 10 | Dortmund 70, Leverkusen 67, Bochum 61, Hannover 12, Bayern 3 |
| 54 | Aleksandar Ristić | (Socialist Federal Republic of Yugoslavia) | 211 | 1981 | 1996 | 8 | Düsseldorf 100, Braunschweig 60, Schalke 34, Hamburg 17 |
| 54 | Michael Skibbe | (Germany) | 211 | 1998 | 2012 | 8 | Leverkusen 94, Frankfurt 61, Dortmund 52, Hertha 4 |
| 56 | Günter Brocker | (Germany) | 209 | 1963 | 1972 | 9 | Bremen 71, Oberhausen 52, K'lautern 50, Schalke 36 |
| 56 | Manfred Krafft | (Germany) | 209 | 1975 | 1989 | 9 | K'lautern 56, Saarbrücken 49, Karlsruhe 48, Stuttg. Kickers 34, Düsseldorf 13, Darmstadt 9 |
| 58 | Ernst Happel | (Austria) | 204 | 1981 | 1987 | 6 | Hamburg 204 |
| 59 | Horst Köppel | (Germany) | 203 | 1982 | 2006 | 8 | Dortmund 102, M'gladbach 40, Bielefeld 34, Uerdingen 18, Düsseldorf 9 |
Minimum 200 games

== Most Bundesliga games managed by club ==
Current Bundesliga managers who hold the record for the club are shown in bold.

As of 2 July 2026

| Rank | Club | Manager | Nat. | Games | S | Years |
|---|---|---|---|---|---|---|
| 1 | Werder Bremen | Otto Rehhagel | (Germany) | 493 | 15 | 1976 (13), 1981–1995 (480) |
| 2 | SC Freiburg | Christian Streich | (Germany) | 391 | 12 | 2012–2024 |
| 3 | Karlsruher SC | Winfried Schäfer | (Germany) | 371 | 11 | 1987–1998 |
| 4 | Borussia Mönchengladbach | Hennes Weisweiler | (Germany) | 340 | 10 | 1965–1975 |
| 5 | Bayern Munich | Udo Lattek | (Germany) | 299 | 10 | 1970–1975 (163), 1983–1987 (136) |
| 6 | Schalke 04 | Huub Stevens | (Netherlands) | 249 | 10 | 1996–2002 (195), 2011–2012 (44), 2019 (9), 2020 (1) |
| 7 | 1860 Munich | Werner Lorant | (Germany) | 247 | 8 | 1994–2001 |
| 8 | VfL Bochum | Heinz Höher | (Germany) | 238 | 7 | 1972–1979 |
| 8 | Borussia Dortmund | Jürgen Klopp | (Germany) | 238 | 7 | 2008–2015 |
| 10 | Eintracht Braunschweig | Helmuth Johannsen | (Germany) | 230 | 7 | 1963–1970 |
| 11 | 1. FC Kaiserslautern | Karl-Heinz Feldkamp | (Germany) | 220 | 7 | 1978–1982 (136), 1990–1992 (84) |
| 12 | Hertha BSC | Helmut Kronsbein | (Germany) | 212 | 7 | 1968–1974 (195), 1980 (17) |
| 13 | Eintracht Frankfurt | Dietrich Weise | (Germany) | 208 | 7 | 1973–1976 (102), 1983–1986 (106) |
| 14 | Hamburger SV | Ernst Happel | (Austria) | 204 | 6 | 1981–1987 |
| 15 | FC Augsburg | Markus Weinzierl | (Germany) | 173 | 6 | 2012–2016 (136), 2021–2022 (37) |
| 16 | Mainz 05 | Thomas Tuchel | (Germany) | 170 | 5 | 2009–2014 |
| 17 | VfL Wolfsburg | Wolfgang Wolf | (Germany) | 166 | 6 | 1998–2003 |
| 18 | 1. FC Köln | Christoph Daum | (Germany) | 163 | 5 | 1986–1990 (129), 2008–2009 (34) |
| 19 | Union Berlin | Urs Fischer | (Switzerland) | 147 | 5 | 2019–2023 |
| 20 | Bayer Leverkusen | Christoph Daum | (Germany) | 144 | 5 | 1996–2000 |
| 21 | VfB Stuttgart | Jürgen Sundermann | (Germany) | 143 | 5 | 1977–1979 (68), 1980–1982 (68), 1995 (7) |
| 22 | Waldhof Mannheim | Klaus Schlappner | (Germany) | 136 | 4 | 1983–1987 |
| 23 | Hannover 96 | Mirko Slomka | (Germany) | 135 | 5 | 2010–2013 |
| 24 | Fortuna Düsseldorf | Heinz Lucas | (Germany) | 130 | 4 | 1971–1975 |
| 25 | Wattenscheid 09 | Hannes Bongartz | (Germany) | 129 | 4 | 1990–1994 |
| 26 | MSV Duisburg | Friedhelm Funkel | (Germany) | 127 | 4 | 1996–2000 |
| 27 | 1. FC Nürnberg | Heinz Höher | (Germany) | 119 | 4 | 1984–1988 |
| 28 | TSG Hoffenheim | Julian Nagelsmann | (Germany) | 116 | 4 | 2016–2019 |
| 29 | Bayer Uerdingen | Friedhelm Funkel | (Germany) | 104 | 4 | 1991–1996 |
| 30 | Hansa Rostock | Frank Pagelsdorf | (Germany) | 102 | 3 | 1995–1997 (68), 2007–2008 (34) |
| 30 | Energie Cottbus | Eduard Geyer | (Germany) | 102 | 3 | 2000–2003 |
| 30 | 1. FC Heidenheim | Frank Schmidt | (Germany) | 102 | 3 | 2023–2026 |
| 33 | Arminia Bielefeld | Ernst Middendorp | (Germany) | 93 | 4 | 1996–1998 (68), 2007 (25) |
| 34 | RB Leipzig | Marco Rose | (Germany) | 90 | 3 | 2022–2025 |
| 35 | FC St. Pauli | Helmut Schulte | (Germany) | 85 | 3 | 1988–1990 |
| 36 | Wuppertaler SV | Horst Buhtz | (Germany) | 78 | 3 | 1972–1974 |
Minimum 75 games

== Bundesliga title-winning managers ==
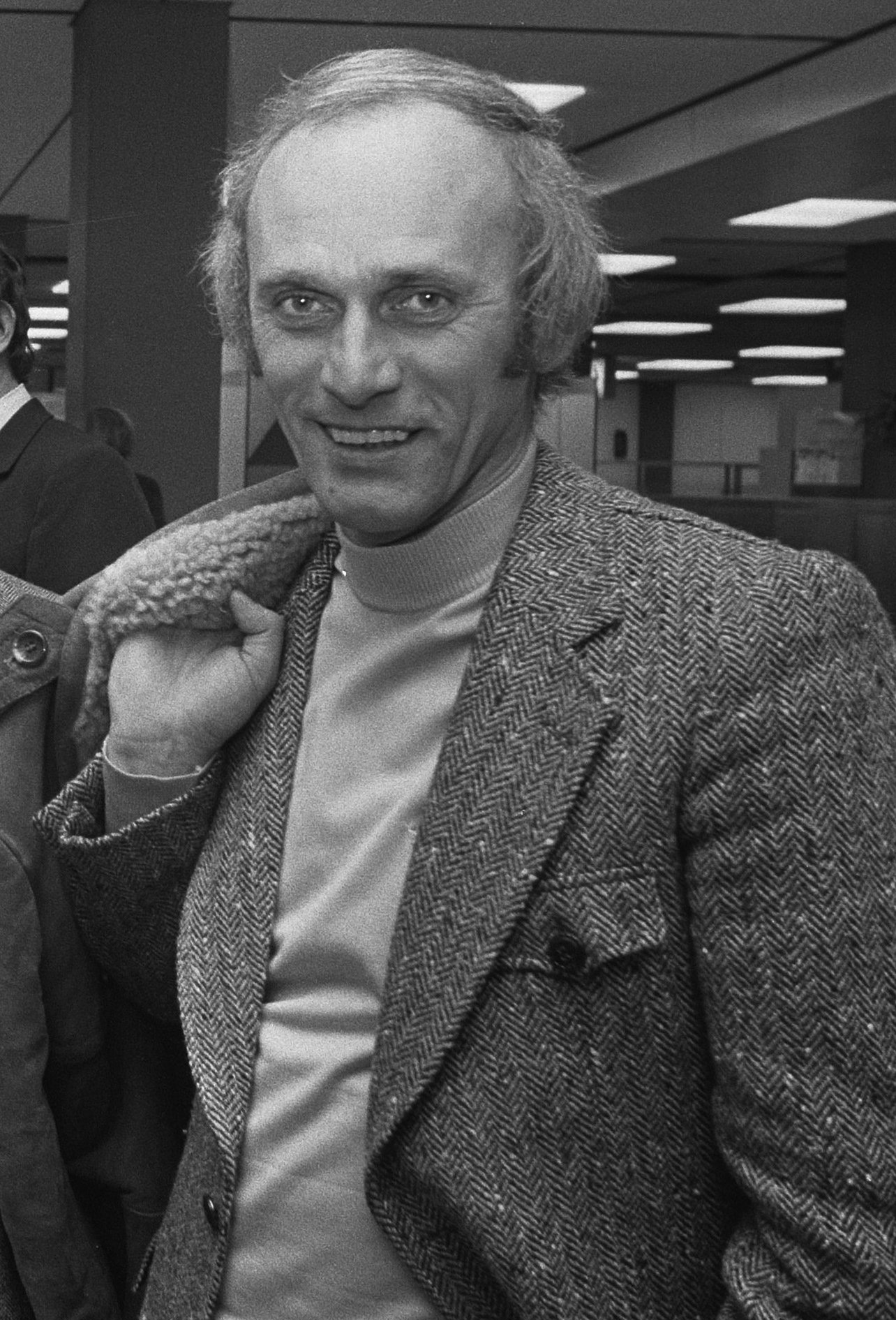
Udo Lattek won a record eight Bundesliga titles as a manager.

| Rank | Manager | Nat. | Titles | Club(s) |
|---|---|---|---|---|
| 1 | Udo Lattek | (Germany) | 8 | Bayern Munich (6), Borussia Mönchengladbach (2) |
| 2 | Ottmar Hitzfeld | (Germany) | 7 | Bayern Munich (5), Borussia Dortmund (2) |
| 3 | Jupp Heynckes | (Germany) | 4 | Bayern Munich (4) |
| 3 | Hennes Weisweiler | (Germany) | 4 | Borussia Mönchengladbach (3), 1. FC Köln |
| 5 | Pep Guardiola | (Spain) | 3 | Bayern Munich (3) |
| 5 | Felix Magath | (Germany) | 3 | Bayern Munich (2), VfL Wolfsburg |
| 5 | Otto Rehhagel | (Germany) | 3 | Werder Bremen (2), 1. FC Kaiserslautern |
| 8 | Pál Csernai | (Hungary) | 2 | Bayern Munich (2) |
| 8 | Hansi Flick | (Germany) | 2 | Bayern Munich (2) |
| 8 | Ernst Happel | (Austria) | 2 | Hamburger SV (2) |
| 8 | Jürgen Klopp | (Germany) | 2 | Borussia Dortmund (2) |
| 8 | Vincent Kompany | (Belgium) | 2 | Bayern Munich (2) |
| 8 | Max Merkel | (Austria) | 2 | 1860 Munich, 1. FC Nürnberg |
| 8 | Branko Zebec | (Socialist Federal Republic of Yugoslavia) | 2 | Bayern Munich, Hamburger SV |
| 15 | Xabi Alonso | (Spain) | 1 | Bayer Leverkusen |
| 15 | Carlo Ancelotti | (Italy) | 1 | Bayern Munich |
| 15 | Franz Beckenbauer | (Germany) | 1 | Bayern Munich |
| 15 | Helmut Benthaus | (Germany) | 1 | VfB Stuttgart |
| 15 | Christoph Daum | (Germany) | 1 | VfB Stuttgart |
| 15 | Karl-Heinz Feldkamp | (Germany) | 1 | 1. FC Kaiserslautern |
| 15 | Helmuth Johannsen | (Germany) | 1 | Eintracht Braunschweig |
| 15 | Georg Knöpfle | (Germany) | 1 | 1. FC Köln |
| 15 | Niko Kovač | (Croatia) | 1 | Bayern Munich |
| 15 | Willy Multhaup | (Germany) | 1 | Werder Bremen |
| 15 | Julian Nagelsmann | (Germany) | 1 | Bayern Munich |
| 15 | Matthias Sammer | (Germany) | 1 | Borussia Dortmund |
| 15 | Thomas Schaaf | (Germany) | 1 | Werder Bremen |
| 15 | Giovanni Trapattoni | (Italy) | 1 | Bayern Munich |
| 15 | Thomas Tuchel | (Germany) | 1 | Bayern Munich |
| 15 | Louis van Gaal | (Netherlands) | 1 | Bayern Munich |
| 15 | Armin Veh | (Germany) | 1 | VfB Stuttgart |

== See also ==
- Bundesliga records and statistics
- List of DFB-Pokal winning managers
