= Georg Wurzer =

German football manager (1907–1982)

Personal information
- Date of birth: 31 January 1907
- Place of birth: Munich, Germany
- Date of death: 8 August 1982 (aged 75)
- Position: Midfielder

Senior career*
Years	Team	Apps	(Gls)
- Wacker München
- Ulmer FV 1894

Managerial career
- 1932–193x: Ulmer FV 1894
- 1936–1939: Gautrainer Sachsen
- 1946: TSG Ulm 1846
- 1947–1960: VfB Stuttgart
- 1960–1962: FC Zürich
- 1962–1966: SSV Reutlingen
- 1966–1971: Stuttgarter Kickers
- * Club domestic league appearances and goals

Georg Wurzer (31 January 1907 – 8 August 1982) was a German football manager. He managed VfB Stuttgart from 1947 to 1960. He also managed FC Zürich, SSV Reutlingen and Stuttgarter Kickers.
