= 1955–56 DFB-Pokal =

Tournament details
- Country: West Germany
- Teams: 5

Final positions
- Champions: Karlsruher SC
- Runner-up: Hamburger SV

Tournament statistics
- Matches played: 4
- Goals scored: 14 (3.5 per match)

The 1955–56 DFB-Pokal was the 13th season of the annual German football cup competition. It began on 29 April， 1956 and ended on 5 August，1956. Five teams, one from each regional federation, competed in the tournament during three rounds. In the final Karlsruher SC defeated Hamburger SV 3–2, thereby defending their title from the preceding season.

== Matches ==
=== Qualification round ===
29 April 1956

| Spandauer SV | 0 – 1 | FK Pirmasens |

=== Semi-finals ===
5/6 June 1956

| Fortuna Düsseldorf | 1 – 2 | Hamburger SV |

5/6 June 1956

| FK Pirmasens | 1 – 5 | Karlsruher SC |

=== Final ===
5 August 1956

| Karlsruher SC | 3–1 | Hamburger SV |
|---|---|---|
| Termath 40', 63'; Kohn 87' | Report | Seeler 16' |

Wildparkstadion, Karlsruhe
Attendance: 25,000
Referee: Adolf Loser (Essen)
