= 1954–55 DFB-Pokal =

Tournament details
- Country: West Germany
- Teams: 32

Final positions
- Champions: Karlsruher SC
- Runners-up: Schalke 04

Tournament statistics
- Matches played: 35

The 1954–55 DFB-Pokal was the 12th season of the annual German football cup competition. It began on 15 August 1954 and ended on 21 May 1955. 32 teams competed in the tournament of five rounds. In the final Karlsruher SC defeated Schalke 04 3–2.

== Matches ==
=== First round ===
15 August 1954
FC Schalke 04	1 – 1	SSV Jahn Regensburg	(AET)
VfB Stuttgart	4 – 2	Arminia Hannover
Altonaer FC 93	3 – 2	1. FC Saarbrücken
Hamburger SV	5 – 3	Eintracht Trier	(AET)
Kickers Offenbach	6 – 3	Hannover 96	(AET)
1. FC Nürnberg	2 – 0	TSV Hüls
Eintracht Frankfurt	1 – 0	FK Pirmasens
Karlsruher SC	5 – 1	FSV Frankfurt
SV Bremerhaven 1893	5 – 1	SpVgg Erkenschwick
SG Düren 99	2 – 5	1. FC Kaiserslautern
1. FC Köln	2 – 1	STV Horst-Emscher
Tennis Borussia Berlin	2 – 4	FC Schweinfurt 05
Union Krefeld	4 – 0	Eintracht Braunschweig
Phönix Ludwigshafen	0 – 0	Alemannia Aachen	(AET)
TuRa Ludwigshafen	0 – 1	FC St. Pauli
Spandauer SV	1 – 2	VfB Lübeck

==== Replays ====
22 August 1954
SSV Jahn Regensburg	3 – 6	FC Schalke 04
Alemannia Aachen	4 – 0	Phönix Ludwigshafen

=== Round of 16 ===
21 September 1954
FC Schalke 04	1 – 1	FC Schweinfurt 05	(AET)
VfB Stuttgart	5 – 1	VfB Lübeck
Altonaer FC 93	2 – 1	Eintracht Frankfurt
Karlsruher SC	1 – 0	1. FC Nürnberg
SV Bremerhaven 1893	3 – 1	Hamburger SV
1. FC Kaiserslautern	7 – 0	1. FC Köln
Alemannia Aachen	4 – 2	Union Krefeld	(AET)
Kickers Offenbach	2 – 0	FC St. Pauli

==== Replay ====
28 September 1954
FC Schweinfurt 05	0 – 1	FC Schalke 04

=== Quarter-finals ===
28 November 1954
Altonaer FC 93	2 – 0	Alemannia Aachen
VfB Stuttgart	2 – 5	Karlsruher SC
Kickers Offenbach	4 – 1	1. FC Kaiserslautern
FC Schalke 04	2 – 0	SV Bremerhaven 1893

=== Semi-finals ===
1 March 1955
FC Schalke 04	2 – 1	Kickers Offenbach
Altonaer FC 93	3 – 3	Karlsruher SC	(AET)

==== Replay ====
2 March 1955
Karlsruher SC	3 – 0	Altonaer FC 93

=== Final ===
21 May 1955

Karlsruher SC	3–2	Schalke 04
Kunkel 20'; Sommerlatt 83'; Traub 86'	Report	Sadlowski 44', 70'

Eintracht-Stadion, Braunschweig
Attendance: 25,000
Referee: Werner Treichel (West Berlin)
