= Walter Baureis =

German footballer

Personal information
- Date of birth: 22 April 1930
- Place of birth: Viernheim, Germany
- Date of death: 22 May 2014 (aged 84)
- Place of death: Germany
- Position: Defender

Senior career*
Years	Team	Apps	(Gls)
1953–1959	Karlsruher SC		

Managerial career
- 1963–1964: Amicitia Viernheim
- 1972–1973: 1. FC Pforzheim
- 1978: Karlsruher SC
- * Club domestic league appearances and goals

Walter Baureis (22 April 1930 – 22 May 2014) was a German football defender for Karlsruher SC (winning the DFB Pokal in 1955 and 1956), and later a manager.
