= Werner Roth (footballer, born 1925) =

German footballer (1925–2011)

Personal information
- Date of birth: 25 July 1925
- Place of birth: Germany
- Date of death: 25 March 2011 (aged 85)
- Position: Midfielder

Youth career
- FC Neureut

Senior career*
Years	Team	Apps	(Gls)
1948–1952	VfB Mühlburg		
1952–1959	Karlsruher SC	156	(10)

Managerial career
- 1965–1966: Karlsruher SC
- * Club domestic league appearances and goals

Werner Roth (25 July 1925 – 25 March 2011) was a German football player and manager.

Roth played as a midfielder for VfB Mühlburg between 1948 and 1952. He remained with the club following Muhlburg's merger with Karlsruher FC Phönix and played for newly formed Karlsruher SC until 1959, appearing 156 times and scoring 10 goals in the Oberliga Süd. He also coached the club in the Bundesliga from 19 October 1965 until 1 November 1966.
