= Bernhard Termath =

German footballer and coach

Personal information
- Full name: Bernhard Termath
- Date of birth: 26 August 1928
- Place of birth: Essen, Germany
- Date of death: 24 March 2004 (aged 75)
- Position: Forward

Senior career*
Years	Team	Apps	(Gls)
1949–1955	Rot-Weiss Essen	143	(56)
1955–1960	Karlsruher SC	135	(20)

International career
1951–1954	West Germany	7	(4)
1953–1956	West Germany B	3	(1)

Managerial career
- 1968: Karlsruher SC
- 1970–1972: Karlsruher FV
- * Club domestic league appearances and goals

Bernhard Termath (26 August 1928 – 24 March 2004) was a German football coach and former player.

From 1949 to 1955 he played for Rot-Weiss Essen, and then for Karlsruher SC. He earned 7 caps and scored 4 goals for West Germany from 1951 to 1954.

He was most notable for coaching the Karlsruher SC football team from 19 February 1968 to 30 June 1968.
