= Adolf Patek =

Austrian footballer (1900–1982)

Personal information
- Date of birth: 4 April 1900
- Place of birth: Vienna, Austria-Hungary
- Date of death: 9 September 1982 (aged 82)
- Position: Striker

Senior career*
Years	Team	Apps	(Gls)
- Wiener Sport-Club
- DFC Prague
- Sparta Prague

Managerial career
- 1946–1949: FC Bern
- 1949–1953: Luxembourg
- 1953–1956: Karlsruher SC
- 1956–1958: Eintracht Frankfurt
- 1958–1961: Bayern Munich
- 1961–1963: SC YF Juventus
- 1963–1966: 1. Wiener Neustädter SC
- * Club domestic league appearances and goals

Adolf Patek (4 April 1900 – 9 September 1982) was an Austrian football player and manager.

== Career ==
Patek began his playing career in 1916 with Wiener Sport-Club. In 1919 his team reached the Austrian Cup finals, but was defeated by SK Rapid Wien 3–0. Along with Karl Jordan, Patek joined DFC Ústí for a short period before moving to DFC Prague. He quickly became known for his ability as a striker and was poached by rivals Sparta Prague. Joined by Pepi Horejs, whom he had played alongside in Vienna, Patek was part of the Sparta side which won the Czechoslovak championship in 1926 and 1927. He additionally won the 1927 Mitropa Cup with Sparta and participated also in the lost final match of 1930 Mitropa Cup, both against Rapid Wien.

He also played for DFC Prag for several years in a league organized by the German Football Association for Bohemia Deutscher Fußball-Verband für Böhmen, which was a football league primarily for German clubs in the Sudetenland. In the 1925/26 season, he even became the second top scorer in the league. Unfortunately, the number of goals is not recorded—only the ranking of the scorers.

Following the Second World War, Patek transitioned into a coaching career, beginning as an assistant in the Austrian Football Association before joining FC Bern from 1947 to 1949 as a coach and trainer. From September 1949 until May 1953, he coached the Luxembourg national team before coaching Karlsruher SC, where he reached his greatest success as a coach, in 1955 leading that team to win the DFB Cup. In the following season, KSC qualified for the final round of the German Cup, ultimately falling to Borussia Dortmund.

In 1956, Patek became coach of Eintracht Frankfurt, winning the first DFB-Pokal final played under floodlights, against Schalke 04. After two years in Frankfurt, he spent another three as a coach at Bayern Munich, staying until 1961. After a short stint with SC YF Juventus, he returned to Austrian football to coach SC Wiener Neustadt, winning the 1963 Austrian Cup final against LASK Linz. This qualified the team for the European Cup, but they fell to Ştiinţa Cluj.
