= Dietrich Weise =

German footballer and manager (1934–2020)

Personal information
- Full name: Hans-Dietrich Weise
- Date of birth: 21 November 1934
- Place of birth: Gröben, Province of Saxony, Prussia, Germany
- Date of death: 20 December 2020 (aged 86)
- Place of death: Heilbronn, Germany
- Position: Forward

Youth career
- 1950–1956: Teuchern

Senior career*
| Years | Team | Apps | (Gls) |
| 1957–1958 | Fortschritt Weißenfels | | |
| 1958–1964 | SpVgg Neckarsulm | | |
- Eintracht Frankfurt
- Viktoria Sindlingen
- Rot-Weiß Frankfurt
- 1. FSV Mainz 05

Managerial career
- 1969: 1. FC Kaiserslautern
- 1971–1973: 1. FC Kaiserslautern
- 1973–1976: Eintracht Frankfurt
- 1976–1978: Fortuna Düsseldorf
- West Germany (youth)
- 1983: 1. FC Kaiserslautern
- 1983–1986: Eintracht Frankfurt
- 1988–1989: Al-Ahly
- 1990–1991: Egypt
- 1994–1996: Liechtenstein
- * Club domestic league appearances and goals

Dietrich Weise (21 November 1934 – 20 December 2020) was a German footballer and football manager.

== Career ==
He coached 1. FC Kaiserslautern, Eintracht Frankfurt, Fortuna Düsseldorf, Germany (youth), Al-Ahly, Liechtenstein as well as the Egypt national team.

== Honours ==
=== Manager ===
==== Kaiserslautern ====
- DFB-Pokal runner-up: 1971-72

==== Eintracht Frankfurt ====
- DFB-Pokal: 1973-74, 1974-75

==== Fortuna Düsseldorf ====
- DFB-Pokal runner-up: 1977-78

==== Al-Ahly ====
- Egyptian Premier League: 1988-89
- Egypt cup: 1988-89
