= Ludwig Janda =

German footballer (1919–1981)

Personal information
- Date of birth: 13 January 1919
- Place of birth: Fürth, Germany
- Date of death: 22 August 1981 (aged 62)
- Position: Forward

Senior career*
Years	Team	Apps	(Gls)
1936–1938	SpVgg Fürth	20	(10)
1938–1943	1860 Munich	73	(69)
1943–1944	LSV Hamburg	5	(6)
1944–1945	LSV Kaufbeuren	4	(3)
1945–1949	1860 Munich	116	(41)
1949–1951	Fiorentina	47	(13)
1951–1954	Novara	68	(19)
Total		333	(161)

Managerial career
- 1954–1956: Viktoria Aschaffenburg
- 1956–1959: Karlsruher SC
- 1959–1961: FSV Frankfurt
- 1961–1962: Viktoria Aschaffenburg
- * Club domestic league appearances and goals

Ludwig Janda (13 January 1919 – 22 August 1981) was a German football player and manager who played for SpVgg Fürth, 1860 Munich, AC Fiorentina and Novara Calcio.

In 1949, he transferred from 1860 Munich to Fiorentina for a fee of DM 30,000. He made his league debut on Boxing Day in a 0–0 draw against Palermo, becoming the first German to play in Serie A.
