= Kurt Sommerlatt =

German footballer and manager (1928–2019)

Personal information
- Full name: Kurt Sommerlatt
- Date of birth: 25 December 1928
- Place of birth: Karlsruhe, Germany
- Date of death: 8 February 2019 (aged 90)
- Place of death: Karlsruhe, Germany
- Position: Midfielder

Senior career*
Years	Team	Apps	(Gls)
1947–1950	Karlsruher SC		
1950–1952	VfB Mühlburg		
1952–1957	Karlsruher SC		
1957–1959	Bayern Munich		
1959–1961	FC La Chaux-de-Fonds		

Managerial career
- 1959–1962: FC La Chaux-de-Fonds
- 1962–1965: Karlsruher SC
- 1965–1967: FK Pirmasens
- 1968–1969: VfR Frankenthal
- 1969–1971: Borussia Neunkirchen
- 1971–1972: FC Homburg
- 1972–1973: SpVgg Ludwigsburg
- 1973–1974: FK Pirmasens
- * Club domestic league appearances and goals

Kurt Sommerlatt (25 December 1928 – 8 February 2019) was a German footballer and manager. He was born in Karlsruhe and died there in 2019.

== Career ==
Sommerlatt played for VfB Mühlburg, Karlsruher SC, Bayern Munich and FC La Chaux-de-Fonds. He also competed in the 1952 Summer Olympics.
