= Karlsruher SC =

German professional football club

- Full name: Karlsruher Sport-Club; Mühlburg-Phönix e. V.
- Nicknames: KSC, Eurofighter (since 93–94 season)
- Founded: 6 June 1894; 132 years ago
- Ground: BBBank Wildpark
- Capacity: 33,180
- President: Holger Siegmund-Schultze
- Head coach: Maximilian Senft
- League: 2. Bundesliga
- 2025–26: 2. Bundesliga, 10th of 18
- Website: ksc.de
Home colours	Away colours	Third colours

Karlsruher Sport-Club Mühlburg-Phönix e. V., better known as Karlsruher SC, is a German association football club, based in Karlsruhe, Baden-Württemberg that currently plays in the 2. Bundesliga, the second tier of German football. Domestically, the club was crowned German champion in 1909 and won the DFB-Pokal in 1955 and 1956. In Europe, KSC won the UEFA Intertoto Cup in 1996, which remains the club's last major honour.

Formed as Karlsruher Fussball Club Phönix in 1894, the modern form of the club was formed as the result of several mergers in 1952, and its early success granted KSC a spot in the inaugural Bundesliga season in 1963. KSC spent the next few decades as a yo-yo club, frequently being promoted and relegated between the top two divisions, with their best Bundesliga season coming in 1996 when KSC finished 6th in the table. Relegation followed in 1998, and the club has since spent all but two seasons between the second and third tiers. KSC maintains a fierce rivalry with VfB Stuttgart, in which old Badenese-Württembergian animosities are played out.

== History ==
=== A succession of mergers ===
The most successful of these ancestral clubs was Karlsruher Fussball Club Phönix, formed on 6 June 1894 by dissatisfied gymnastics club Karlsruher Turngemeinde members. They quickly became a strong regional side, playing in the Südkreis-Liga, and won the national title in 1909, defeating defending champions Viktoria 89 Berlin 4–2 in the championship final that season. In 1912, Phönix merged with KFC Alemannia, established in 1897, to create KFC Phönix (Phönix Alemannia).

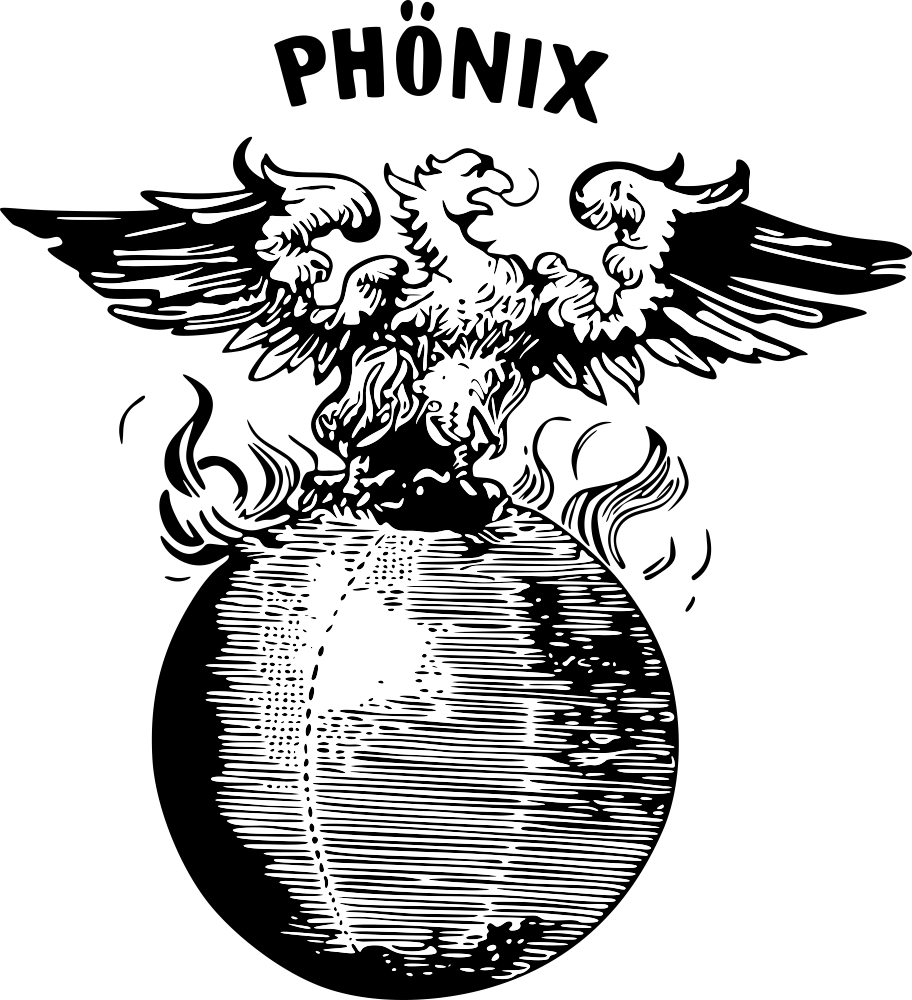
First Logo of Phönix Karlsruhe in 1897

It was as Phönix Karlsruhe that the club joined the Gauliga Baden, one of 16 top-flight divisions created in the re-organization of German football under the Third Reich. They slipped from the first division for a single season in 1936, but returned to compete as a mediocre side over the next several years. In the 1943–44 season, Karlsruhe played with Germania Durlach as the combined wartime side named KSG (Kriegssportgemeinschaft) Phönix/Germania Karlsruhe. After World War II in 1946, Phönix re-emerged to compete in the newly formed first division Oberliga Süd, finishing 15th in their first season there. The club was relegated the following season.

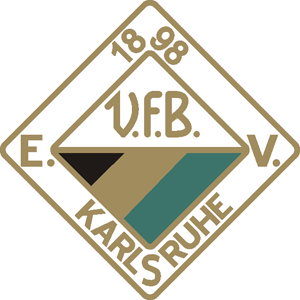
Logo of predecessor side VfB Karlsruhe c. 1931

Two other threads in the evolution of KSC were the formation of FC Mühlburg in 1905 out of 1. FV Sport Mühlburg (founded in 1890) and Viktoria Mühlburg (founded in 1892), and the merger of FC Germania (founded in 1898) and FC Weststadt (founded in 1902) to form VfB Karlsruhe in 1911. FC Mühlburg and VfB Karlsruhe would, in turn, merge to form VfB Mühlburg in 1933. The group of clubs which came together to form VfB Mühlburg were an undistinguished lot, sharing just one season of upper-league play between them. The new side, however, started to compete in the first-division Gauliga Baden immediately after the league was established in 1933.

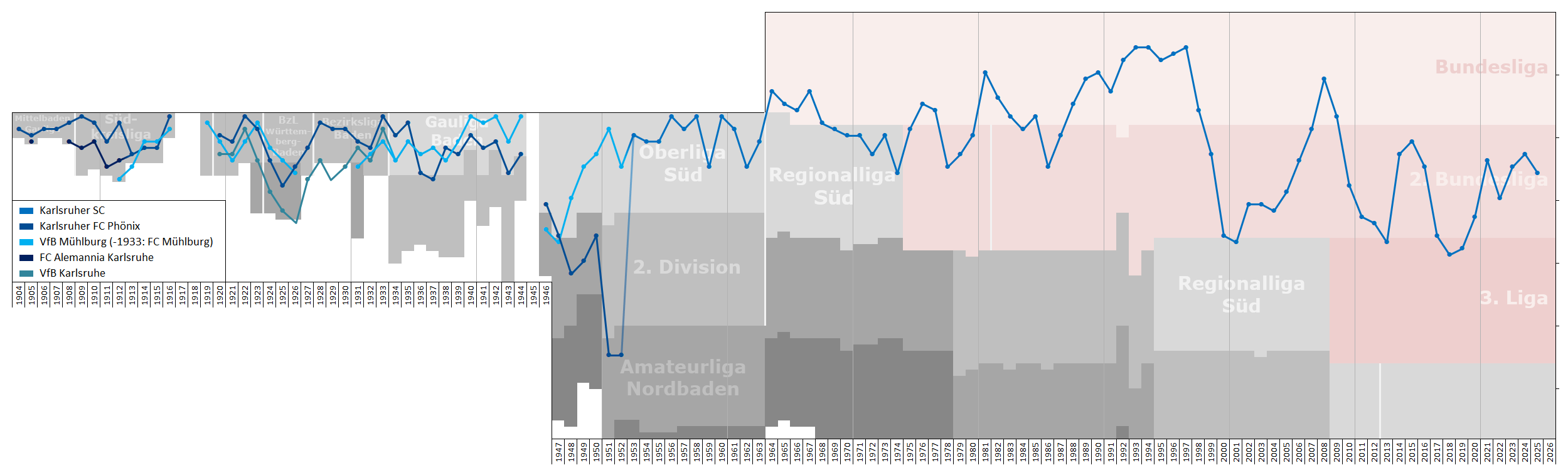
Historical chart of Karlsruher SC league performance

A lower-table side through the 1930s, VfB's performance improved considerably in the following decade. As war overtook the country, the Gauliga Baden was sub-divided at various times into a number of more local city-based circuits, and the team was able to earn three second-place finishes in divisional play. The Gauliga Baden collapsed in 1944–45 after playing a significantly reduced schedule in which many teams, including Mühlburg, were unable to compete. After the war the club slipped from top-flight competition until earning promotion to the Oberliga Süd in 1947. They generally competed as a mid-table side here with the exception of a strong performance in 1951 when they narrowly missed an advance to the national championship rounds after earning a third-place result just a single point behind SpVgg Fürth.

=== The formation of Karlsruher SC ===
KFC Phoenix and VfB Mühlburg united to form the Karlsruher Sport-Club Mühlburg-Phönix e. V., on 16 October 1952 and the new team earned good results throughout the remainder of the decade. In 1955, they beat Schalke 04 3–2 to win the DFB-Pokal, and repeated the success next year with a 3–1 win over Hamburger SV. That season, they also made an appearance in the national final, where they lost 2–4 to Borussia Dortmund. KSC was Oberliga Süd champion in 1956, 1958 and 1960, as well as runner-up in the DFB-Pokal in 1960, when they lost the final match 2–3 to Borussia Mönchengladbach. Their record earned them admission as one of sixteen founding clubs into Germany's new professional football league, the Bundesliga, when it began play in 1963.

Karlsruhe struggled in the top flight, never managing better than a 13th-place finish over five seasons before finally being demoted to the second-division Regionalliga Süd. Over the next three seasons, the team earned a first-place finish as well as two-second-place finishes there but were unable to advance in the promotion rounds. After the 1974 formation of the 2. Bundesliga, which consisted of two divisions at the time, KSC finished first in the 2. Bundesliga Süd and returned to the top flight for the 1975–76 season but were able to stay up for only two years. They next returned to the first division in 1980, where they spent four seasons before being sent down again. After a two-year absence, they were promoted back to the Bundesliga in 1987 to begin an extended stay.

=== The Schäfer era ===
Under the guidance of new coach Winfried Schäfer, KSC's return to the top flight was marked with some success as for the first time, the team managed to work its way out of the bottom half of the league table. In the 1993–94 season, the club had a successful run in the UEFA Cup, going out in the semi-finals on away goals to Austria Salzburg after beating, in turn, PSV, Valencia, Bordeaux and Boavista. Their 7–0 second-round victory over Valencia, a top team in the Spanish La Liga at the time and in historical terms as well, might be considered the high point of the club's history in its centennial year. Edgar "Euro Eddy" Schmitt scored 4 goals and became a club legend. Between 1992 and 1997, the club was ranked in the single digits in six consecutive Bundesliga seasons, and participated in two more UEFA Cups, reaching the third round both in the 1996–97 and 1997–98 seasons, being eliminated from the competition after losing their second-leg matches to Brøndby and Spartak Moscow respectively. In 1995, KSC won the DFB-Hallenpokal, an indoor football tournament that was traditionally held during winter breaks of the Bundesliga seasons. They also played in the final of the DFB-Pokal in 1996 but lost 0–1 to 1. FC Kaiserslautern.

As the millennium drew to a close, Karlsruhe faded. The club started the 1997–98 Bundesliga season well, with two wins and a draw in their opening three matches, but their downfall began with a 1–6 defeat to Bayer Leverkusen on Day 4. At the league winter break the club sat outside the relegation ranks, but a series of negative results pushed them down to 15th place until the second-last matchday of the season. Schäfer was fired in March 1998, but this did not keep the club from slipping to the Second Bundesliga after a 16th-place finish. The club needed an away draw against Hansa Rostock on the final day of the season to avoid relegation but lost the match 2–4 while Borussia Mönchengladbach beat VfL Wolfsburg 2–0 to overtake KSC and finish 15th on goal difference.

=== After relegation from the Bundesliga in 1998 ===
KSC finished fifth in their first season in the 2. Bundesliga after relegation, only two points behind third-place SSV Ulm 1846 which was promoted to the Bundesliga. However, a last place finish in a terrible 1999–2000 season played under dire financial circumstances dropped them down to the Regionalliga Süd (III). The club rebounded and on the strength of a first-place result in the Regionalliga made a prompt return to second division play. After four seasons of mediocre play that saw KSC narrowly avoid being sent further down, the team turned in a much-improved performance and earned a sixth-place result in 2005–06.

=== From 2007 ===
KSC secured the 2007 2. Bundesliga title with three games left in the season by way of a 1–0 victory over SpVgg Unterhaching on 29 April, combined with a draw by second-placed Hansa Rostock on 30 April. KSC maintained its dominance over the course of the season, playing 14 matches (nine wins, five draws) before suffering their first loss of the campaign at the hands of Erzgebirge Aue. They became the first team in the history of the single-division 2. Bundesliga to occupy the top spot throughout the whole season.

In their return season to the Bundesliga in 2007–08 they finished 11th, fading in the second half of the year after a strong start that saw them positioned in the qualifying places for European competition. The club continued to perform poorly in the 2008–09 season, ultimately finishing 17th and finding themselves relegated to the 2. Bundesliga once more. The club's two most recent campaigns there ended with 10th and 15th-place finishes. Karlsruhe finished second level as 16th and faced Jahn Regensburg with relegation play-offs. These teams draw with as 1–1 at Regensburg and as 2–2 at Karlsruhe. This meant Karlsruhe's relegation to third tier after 12 years according to away goal rule.

The club successfully bounced back in 2012–13 when it won a championship in the 3. Liga and earned promotion back to the 2. Bundesliga.

2014–15 would see the club come close to a return to the Bundesliga, a third-place finish would see them play a promotion play-off against Hamburg, and after a 1–1 draw in Hamburg in the first leg, KSC were seconds away from promotion, only for Hamburg to score an equaliser in the 90th minute to force extra time, where they would score a winning away goal late in the second half to secure their Bundesliga status for another season.

In 2019, Karlsruhe won 4–1 against Preußen Münster on matchday 31, therefore returning to the 2. Bundesliga after a hiatus of two years.

=== Reserve team ===
The Karlsruher SC II, historically also referred to as Karlsruher SC Amateure, is a successful side in its own right, playing for many years as high up as the Regionalliga Süd. At the end of the 2011–12 season, the team was forcefully relegated to the Oberliga because of the relegation of the first team to the 3. Liga as reserve teams of 3. Liga clubs are not permitted in the Regionalliga anymore from 2012. The team had suffered a similar fate in 2000, when the first team was relegated to the Regionalliga Süd and the reserve team therefore had to leave this league despite finishing above the relegation ranks.

Between 1991 and 2000, the team also won the North Baden Cup on four occasions, thereby qualifying for the first round of the DFB-Pokal on each occasion. Its greatest success in this competition was reaching the third round in 1996–97.

After many restrained years, in which the targeted promotion was clearly missed, the already greatly reduced second team was discontinued for financial reasons at the end of the 2017–18 Oberliga season. However, KSC reopened its second team as a fans' team for the 2019–20 season and entered the Kreisklasse C, the lowest level of league football in Karlsruhe and North Baden.

In November 2023, Karlsruher SC announced that it would reinstate an under-23 team for the 2024–25 season, following approval by the Baden Football Association. The reinstated reserve team is organised as the highest team within the club's academy structure, providing a transition for young players between youth football and the professional game, and entered the Verbandsliga Baden for the 2024–25 campaign. In its first season after reinstatement, the team won the league title and secured promotion to the Oberliga Baden-Württemberg for the following campaign.

== Honours ==
The club's honours:

=== League ===
- German football championship
  - Champions: 1909
  - Runners-up: 1956
- Southern German championship
  - Champions: 1909, 1955–56, 1957–58, 1959–60, 1974–75
- Südkreis-Liga (I)
  - Champions: 1909
  - Runners-up: 1910, 1912
- Bezirksliga Baden (I)
  - Champions: 1933
  - Runners-up: 1928, 1931
- Gauliga Baden
  - Runners-up: 1935
- Oberliga Süd (I)
  - Champions: 1955–56, 1957–58, 1959–60
- 2. Bundesliga (II)
  - Champions: 1974–75, 1983–84, 2006–07
  - Runners-up: 1979–80, 1986–87
- Regionalliga Süd (II)
  - Champions: 1968–69
  - Runners-up: 1969–70, 1970–71, 1972–73
- Regionalliga Süd (III)
  - Champions: 2000–01
- 3. Liga (III)
  - Champions: 2012–13
  - Runners-up: 2018–19

=== Cup ===
- DFB-Pokal
  - Winners: 1954–55, 1955–56
  - Runners-up: 1959–60, 1995–96
- Baden Cup (Tiers III–V)
  - Winners: 2012–13, 2017–18, 2018–19

=== International ===
- UEFA Intertoto Cup
  - Champions: 1996
- Intertoto Cup
  - Winners: 1988 (group 10), 1992 (group 4)

=== Reserve team ===
- Oberliga Baden-Württemberg
  - Champions: 1989–90, 1995–96, 2004–05
- Verbandsliga Nordbaden (IV–V)
  - Champions: 1982–83, 1988–89, 1993–94
- Amateurliga Nordbaden (III)
  - Champions: 1964–65
- North Baden Cup
  - Winners: 1990–91, 1993–94, 1995–96, 1999–2000

- All pre-1952 titles listed here were won by Phönix Karlsruhe

== Players ==
=== Current squad ===
As of 3 September 2026

Note: Flags indicate national team as defined under FIFA eligibility rules; some limited exceptions apply. Players may hold more than one non-FIFA nationality.

No.	Pos.	Nation	Player
1	GK	DEN	Hans Christian Bernat
2	DF	GER	Sebastian Jung
3	DF	TUR	Deniz Ofli (on loan from Bayern Munich)
4	DF	BRA	Héliton
5	DF	KOR	Kwon Hyeok-kyu
6	MF	FIN	Santeri Väänänen
7	MF	GER	Kevin Wiethaup
9	FW	GER	Moritz Broschinski (on loan from Basel)
10	MF	GER	Marvin Wanitzek (captain)
11	FW	GER	Noel Eichinger
13	FW	JPN	Shiō Fukuda
15	DF	GER	Paul Scholl
17	FW	GER	Eymen Laghrissi

No.	Pos.	Nation	Player
18	GK	GER	Ferdinand Gebert
19	FW	GER	Louey Ben Farhat (on loan from SC Freiburg)
22	DF	AUT	Christoph Kobald
23	MF	ALB	Tim Civeja
24	DF	MAD	Sandro Trémoulet
25	MF	GER	Lilian Egloff
26	MF	GER	Danyal Zor
27	FW	GER	John Davis Meyer
28	DF	GER	Marcel Franke
30	GK	GER	Robin Himmelmann
33	DF	SWE	Viktor Bergh
36	DF	GER	Rafael Pinto Pedrosa
37	FW	ITA	Jason Ponente-Ramirez

=== Out on loan ===
Note: Flags indicate national team as defined under FIFA eligibility rules; some limited exceptions apply. Players may hold more than one non-FIFA nationality.

No.	Pos.	Nation	Player
—	DF	GER	Niclas Dühring (at SV Drochtersen/Assel until 30 June 2027)
—	MF	GER	Mateo Kritzer (at Eintracht Trier until 30 June 2027)

No.	Pos.	Nation	Player
—	MF	GER	Andreas Müller (at Fortuna Düsseldorf until 30 June 2027)

== Coaching staff ==
Position	Name
Director of professional football	(Australia) Timon Pauls
Head coach	(Austria) Maximilian Senft
Goalkeeper coach	(Germany) Markus Miller
Rehabilitation coach	(Germany) Wendelin Wäcker

=== Coaching history ===
Coaches of the club since 1952:

- Hans Hipp – 16 October 1952 – 30 April 1953
- Friedel Moser – 1 May 1953 – 30 June 1953
- Adolf Patek – 1 July 1953 – 31 July 1956
- Ludwig Janda – 1 July 1956 – 30 June 1959
- Eduard Frühwirth – 1 July 1959 – 30 June 1962
- Kurt Sommerlatt – 1 July 1962 – 26 January 1965
- Helmut Schneider – 27 January 1965 – 18 October 1965
- Werner Roth – 19 October 1965 – 1 November 1966
- Paul Frantz – 2 November 1966 – 24 October 1967
- Georg Gawliczek – 25 October 1967 – 8 February 1968
- Herbert Widmayer – 10 February 1968 – 18 February 1968
- Bernhard Termath – 19 February 1968 – 30 June 1968
- Kurt Baluses – 1 July 1968 – 21 May 1971
- Carl-Heinz Rühl – 1 July 1973 – 30 June 1977
- Bernd Hoss – 1 July 1977 – 26 October 1977
- Rolf Schafstall – 27 October 1977 – 15 April 1978
- Walter Baureis – 1 July 1978 – 26 November 1978
- Manfred Krafft – 1 July 1978 – 30 June 1981
- Max Merkel – 27 November 1981 – 30 June 1982
- Horst Franz – 1 July 1982 – 31 January 1983
- Werner Olk – 1 July 1984 – 22 March 1985
- Lothar Buchmann – 26 March 1985 – 25 April 1986
- Winfried Schäfer – 1 July 1986 – 25 March 1998
- Jörg Berger – 25 March 1998 – 25 August 1998
- Rainer Ulrich – 26 August 1998 – 15 October 1999
- Joachim Löw – 28 October 1999 – 19 April 2000
- Stefan Kuntz – 1 July 2000 – 25 October 2002
- Lorenz-Günther Köstner – 1 November 2002 – 20 December 2004
- Reinhold Fanz – 28 December 2004 – 4 January 2005
- Edmund Becker – 13 January 2005 – 19 August 2009
- Markus Kauczinski – 20 August 2009 – 3 September 2009
- Markus Schupp – 3 September 2009 – 1 November 2010
- Markus Kauczinski – 1 November 2010 – 21 November 2010
- Uwe Rapolder – 22 November 2010 – 1 March 2011
- Rainer Scharinger – 2 March 2011 – 31 October 2011
- Markus Kauczinski – 31 October 2011 – 6 November 2011
- Jørn Andersen – 6 November 2011 – 26 March 2012
- Markus Kauczinski – 26 March 2012 – 30 June 2016
- Tomas Oral – 1 July 2016 – 4 December 2016
- Lukas Kwasniok – 4 December 2016 – 22 December 2016
- Mirko Slomka – 3 January 2017 – 4 April 2017
- Marc-Patrick Meister – 4 April 2017 – 20 August 2017
- Christian Eichner, Zlatan Bajramović – 20 August 2017 – 29 August 2017
- Alois Schwartz – 29 August 2017 – 3 February 2020
- Christian Eichner – 3 February 2020 – May 2026
- Maximilian Senft – June 2026 -

== Recent seasons ==
The recent season-by-season performance of the club:

=== Karlsruher SC ===
Season	Division	Tier	Position
1963–64	1. Bundesliga	I	13th
1964–65	1. Bundesliga	I	15th
1965–66	1. Bundesliga	I	16th
1966–67	1. Bundesliga	I	13th
1967–68	1. Bundesliga	I	18th ↓
1968–69	Regionalliga Süd	II	1st
1969–70	Regionalliga Süd	II	2nd
1970–71	Regionalliga Süd	II	2nd
1971–72	Regionalliga Süd	II	5th
1972–73	Regionalliga Süd	II	2nd
1973–74	Regionalliga Süd	II	8th
1974–75	2. Bundesliga Süd	II	1st ↑
1975–76	1. Bundesliga	I	15th
1976–77	1. Bundesliga	I	16th ↓
1977–78	2. Bundesliga Süd	II	7th
1978–79	2. Bundesliga Süd	II	5th
1979–80	2. Bundesliga Süd	II	2nd ↑
1980–81	1. Bundesliga	I	10th
1981–82	1. Bundesliga	I	14th
1982–83	1. Bundesliga	I	17th ↓
1983–84	2. Bundesliga	II	1st ↑
1984–85	1. Bundesliga	I	17th ↓
1985–86	2. Bundesliga	II	7th
1986–87	2. Bundesliga	II	2nd ↑
1987–88	1. Bundesliga	I	15th
1988–89	1. Bundesliga	I	11th
1989–90	1. Bundesliga	I	10th
1990–91	1. Bundesliga	I	13th
1991–92	1. Bundesliga	I	8th
1992–93	1. Bundesliga	I	6th
1993–94	1. Bundesliga	I	6th
1994–95	1. Bundesliga	I	8th
1995–96	1. Bundesliga	I	7th
1996–97	1. Bundesliga	I	6th
1997–98	1. Bundesliga	I	16th ↓
1998–99	2. Bundesliga	II	5th
1999–2000	2. Bundesliga	II	18th ↓
2000–01	Regionalliga Süd	III	1st ↑
2001–02	2. Bundesliga	II	13th
2002–03	2. Bundesliga	II	13th
2003–04	2. Bundesliga	II	14th
2004–05	2. Bundesliga	II	11th
2005–06	2. Bundesliga	II	6th
2006–07	2. Bundesliga	II	1st ↑
2007–08	1. Bundesliga	I	11th
2008–09	1. Bundesliga	I	17th ↓
2009–10	2. Bundesliga	II	10th
2010–11	2. Bundesliga	II	15th
2011–12	2. Bundesliga	II	16th ↓
2012–13	3. Liga	III	1st ↑
2013–14	2. Bundesliga	II	5th
2014–15	2. Bundesliga	II	3rd
2015–16	2. Bundesliga	II	7th
2016–17	2. Bundesliga	II	18th ↓
2017–18	3. Liga	III	3rd
2018–19	3. Liga	III	2nd ↑
2019–20	2. Bundesliga	II	15th
2020–21	2. Bundesliga	II	6th
2021–22	2. Bundesliga	II	12th
2022–23	2. Bundesliga	II	7th
2023–24	2. Bundesliga	II	5th
2024–25	2. Bundesliga	II	8th
2025–26	2. Bundesliga	II	10th
2026–27	2. Bundesliga	II	

=== Karlsruher SC II ===
Season	Division	Tier	Position
1999–00	Regionalliga Süd	III	12th↓
2000–01	Oberliga Baden-Württemberg	IV	8th
2001–02	Oberliga Baden-Württemberg	IV	11th
2002–03	Oberliga Baden-Württemberg	IV	15th
2003–04	Oberliga Baden-Württemberg	IV	4th
2004–05	Oberliga Baden-Württemberg	IV	1st↑
2005–06	Regionalliga Süd	III	11th
2006–07	Regionalliga Süd	III	14th
2007–08	Regionalliga Süd	III	16th
2008–09	Regionalliga Süd	IV	16th
2009–10	Regionalliga Süd	IV	10th
2010–11	Regionalliga Süd	IV	10th
2011–12	Regionalliga Süd	IV	5th↓
2012–13	Oberliga Baden-Württemberg	V	12th
2013–14	Oberliga Baden-Württemberg	V	5th
2014–15	Oberliga Baden-Württemberg	V	6th
2015–16	Oberliga Baden-Württemberg	V	4th
2016–17	Oberliga Baden-Württemberg	V	12th
2017–18	Oberliga Baden-Württemberg	V	15th (folded)
2018–19	defunct		
2019–20	Kreisklasse C1 Karlsruhe	XI	

- With the introduction of the Regionalligas in 1994 and the 3. Liga in 2008 as the new third tier, below the 2. Bundesliga, all leagues below dropped one tier. In 2012, the number of Regionalligas was increased from three to five with all Regionalliga Süd clubs except the Bavarian ones entering the new Regionalliga Südwest.

Key

↑ Promoted	↓ Relegated
