= 1944 German football championship =

1944 German championship
Deutsche Fußballmeisterschaft
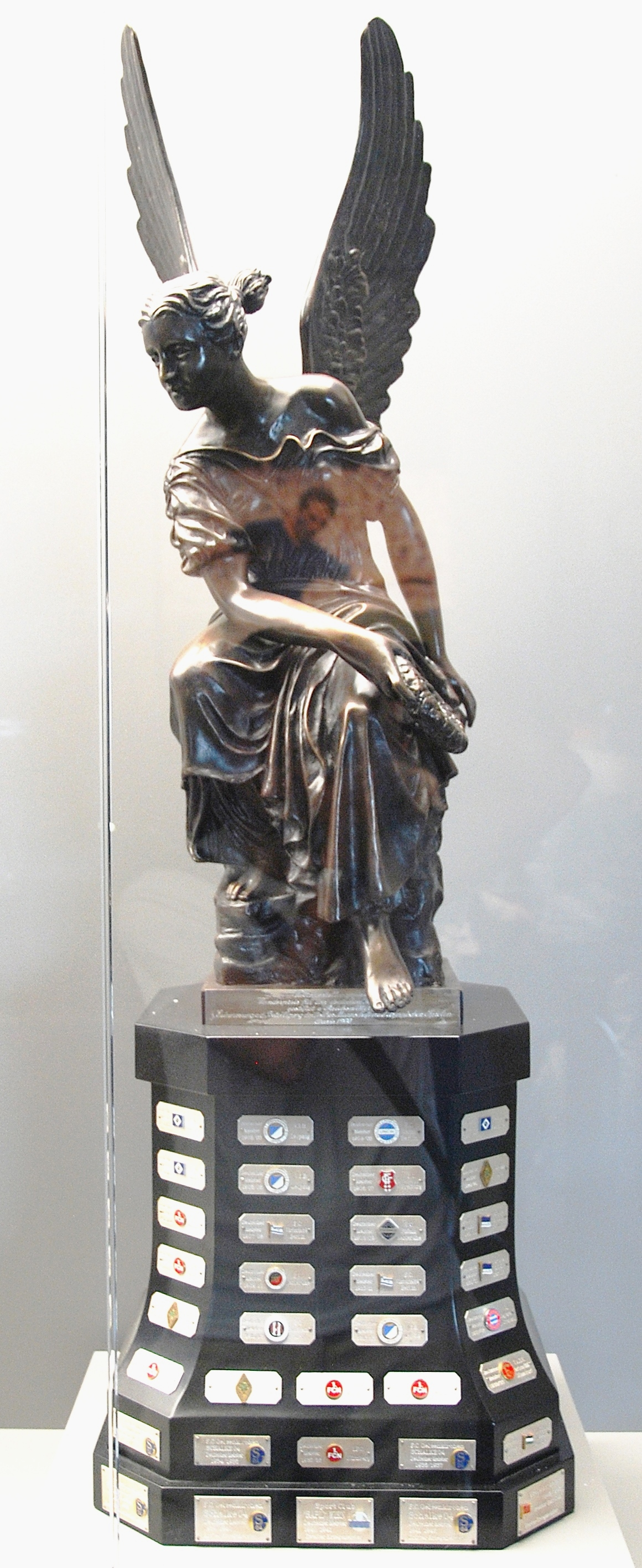
- Replica of the Viktoria trophy

Tournament details
- Country: Germany
- Dates: 16 April – 18 June
- Teams: 31

Final positions
- Champions: Dresdner SC; 2nd German title
- Runners-up: LSV Hamburg

Tournament statistics
- Matches played: 32
- Goals scored: 185 (5.78 per match)
- Top goal scorer: Helmut Schön (14 goals)

The 1944 German football championship, the 37th edition of the competition, was won by Dresdner SC, the club defending its 1943 title by defeating Luftwaffe team LSV Hamburg in the final.

The final years of the German Championship during the war saw many military teams compete in the championship, Luftwaffe teams, Luftwaffensportvereine, short LSV, and, Wehrmacht teams, Wehrmachtssportvereine, short WSV, became very competitive.

Dresden's Helmut Schön, who would later coach Germany to the 1974 FIFA World Cup, became the top scorer of the 1944 championship with 14 goals, the second-highest individual amount of any player in the history of the competition from 1903 to 1963.

It was the last edition of the tournament during the Second World War, with the competition not being held again until 1948. The thirty-one 1943–44 Gauliga champions, two more than in the previous season, competed in a single-leg knock out competition to determine the national champion.

Dresdner SC became the last club to be awarded the Viktoria, the annual trophy for the German champions from 1903 to 1944. The trophy disappeared during the final stages of the war, did not resurface until after the German reunification and was put on display at the DFB headquarters in Frankfurt until 2015, when it was moved to the new Deutsches Fußballmuseum in Dortmund.

== Qualified teams ==
The teams qualified through the 1943–44 Gauliga season:

Club	Qualified from
VfR Mannheim	Gauliga Baden
MSV Brünn	Gauliga Böhmen und Mähren
Hertha BSC	Gauliga Berlin-Brandenburg
LSV Danzig	Gauliga Danzig-Westpreußen
FC Mühlhausen 93	Gauliga Elsaß
LSV Mölders Krakau	Gauliga Generalgouvernement
LSV Hamburg	Gauliga Hamburg
Kickers Offenbach	Gauliga Hessen-Nassau
KSG VfL 99 Köln/SpVgg Sülz 07	Gauliga Köln-Aachen
Borussia Fulda	Gauliga Kurhessen
LSV Rerick	Gauliga Mecklenburg
SV Dessau 05	Gauliga Mitte
TuS Neuendorf	Gauliga Moselland
KSG Duisburg	Gauliga Niederrhein
STC Hirschberg	Gauliga Niederschlesien
1. FC Nürnberg	Gauliga Nordbayern
Germania Königshütte	Gauliga Oberschlesien
WSV Celle	Gauliga Osthannover
First Vienna	Gauliga Ostmark
VfB Königsberg	Gauliga Ostpreußen
HSV Groß-Born	Gauliga Pommern
Dresdner SC	Gauliga Sachsen
Holstein Kiel	Gauliga Schleswig-Holstein
FC Bayern Munich	Gauliga Südbayern
NSTG Brux	Gauliga Sudetenland
Eintracht Braunschweig	Gauliga Südhannover-Braunschweig
SDW Posen	Gauliga Wartheland
SpVgg Wilhelmshaven	Gauliga Weser-Ems
Schalke 04	Gauliga Westfalen
KSG Saarbrücken	Gauliga Westmark
SV Göppingen	Gauliga Württemberg

== Competition ==
=== First round ===
Borussia Fulda received a bye for the first round.

Team 1	Score	Team 2
16 April 1944
LSV Danzig	0–0	Hertha BSC
HSV Groß Born	6–4	LSV Rerick
STC Hirschberg	7–0	SDW Posen
Dresdner SC	9–2	Germania Königshütte
LSV Hamburg	4–0	WSV Celle
Eintracht Braunschweig	1–2	SpVgg Wilhelmshaven
Schalke 04	5–0	TuS Neuendorf
KSG Köln-Sülz	0–2	KSG Duisburg
FC Mühlhausen 93	4–2	Kickers Offenbach
SV Göppingen	3–5	KSG Saarbrücken
VfR Mannheim	2–1	FC Bayern Munich
NSTG Brüx	0–8	1. FC Nürnberg
MSV Brno	3–6	First Vienna
SV Dessau 05	2–3	Holstein Kiel
LSV Mölders Krakau	1–4	VfB Königsberg

==== Replay ====
Team 1	Score	Team 2
23 April 1944
Hertha BSC	7–1	LSV Danzig

=== Round of 16 ===
Team 1	Score	Team 2
7 May 1944
VfB Königsberg	3–10	HSV Groß Born
First Vienna	5–0	STC Hirschberg
Hertha BSC	4–2	Holstein Kiel
Borussia Fulda	2–9	Dresdner SC
SpVgg Wilhelmshaven	1–1	LSV Hamburg
KSG Duisburg	2–1	Schalke 04
KSG Saarbrücken	5–3	FC Mühlhausen 93
1. FC Nürnberg	3–2	VfR Mannheim

==== Replay ====
Team 1	Score	Team 2
14 May 1944
LSV Hamburg	4–2	SpVgg Wilhelmshaven

=== Quarter-finals ===
Team 1	Score	Team 2
21 May 1944
Dresdner SC	3–2	First Vienna
KSG Saarbrücken	1–5	1. FC Nürnberg
HSV Groß Born	3–2	Hertha BSC
LSV Hamburg	3–0	KSG Duisburg

=== Semi-finals ===
4 June 1944

LSV Hamburg	3 – 2	HSV Groß Born
Mühle 7', 30'; Gornick 19'	Report	Plener 59'; Sold 63' (pen.)

Hindenburg-Kampfbahn, Hannover
Attendance: 20,000
Referee: Raspel

4 June 1944

Dresdner SC	3 – 1	1. FC Nürnberg
Voigtmann 4'; Machate 26'; Schön 73' (pen.)	Report	Hettner 44' (pen.)

Mitteldeutsche Landeskampfbahn, Erfurt
Attendance: 35,000
Referee: Multer

=== Third place play-off ===
17 June 1944

1. FC Nürnberg	not played	HSV Groß Born

=== Final ===
18 June 1944

Dresdner SC	4–0	LSV Hamburg
Voigtmann 20'; Schaffer 50', 85'; Schön 60'	Report

Olympiastadion, Berlin
Attendance: 70,000
Referee: P. Trompetter (Cologne)

DRESDNER SC
GK	(Nazi Germany) Willibald Kreß
RB	(Nazi Germany) Fritz Belger
CB	(Nazi Germany) Walter Dzur
LB	(Nazi Germany) Heinz Hempel (c)
RH	(Nazi Germany) Herbert Pohl
LH	(Nazi Germany) Helmut Schubert
OR	(Nazi Germany) Rudi Voigtmann
IR	(Nazi Germany) Helmut Schön
CF	(Nazi Germany) Fritz Machate
IL	(Nazi Germany) Richard Hofmann
OL	(Protectorate of Bohemia and Moravia) Heinrich Schaffer
Manager:
(Nazi Germany) Georg Köhler

LSV HAMBURG
GK	(Nazi Germany) Willy Jürissen
RB	(Nazi Germany) Karl Miller
CB	(Nazi Germany) Heinrich Gärtner
LB	(Nazi Germany) Reinhold Münzenberg (c)
RH	(Nazi Germany) Walter Ochs
LH	(Nazi Germany) Robert Gebhardt
OR	(Nazi Germany) Fritz Zahn
IR	(Nazi Germany) Heinz Mühle
CF	(Nazi Germany) Willi Gornick
IL	(Nazi Germany) Ludwig Janda
OL	(Nazi Germany) Jakob Lotz
Manager:
(Nazi Germany) Karl Höger
