= 1943 German football championship =

1943 German championship
Deutsche Fußballmeisterschaft
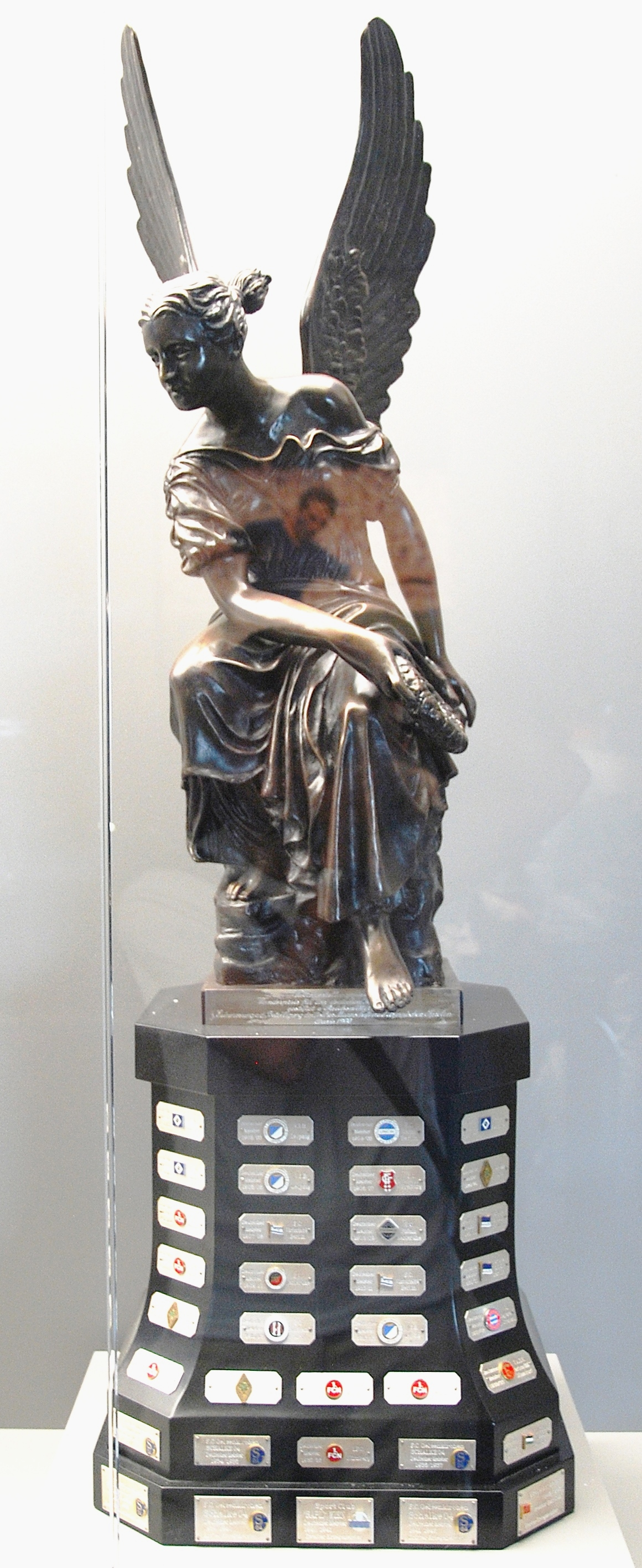
- Replica of the Viktoria trophy

Tournament details
- Country: Germany
- Dates: 11 April – 27 June
- Teams: 29

Final positions
- Champions: Dresdner SC; 1st German title
- Runners-up: FV Saarbrücken
- Third place: Holstein Kiel
- Fourth place: First Vienna

Tournament statistics
- Matches played: 31
- Goals scored: 139 (4.48 per match)
- Top goal scorer(s): Herbert Binkert; Ernst Kalwitzki (5 goals each)

The 1943 German football championship, the 36th edition of the competition, was won by Dresdner SC, the club's first-ever championship, won by defeating FV Saarbrücken in the final.

The twenty-nine 1942–43 Gauliga champions, four more than in the previous season, competed in a single-leg knock out competition to determine the national champion. In the following season, the last completed one during the war, the German championship was played with thirty one clubs, expanded through a combination of territorial expansion of Nazi Germany and the sub-dividing of the Gauligas in later years.

The 1943 championship marked the end of the golden era of Schalke 04 which had reached the semi-finals of each edition of the national championship from 1932 to 1942 and won the competition in 1934, 1935, 1937, 1939, 1940 and 1942 while losing the final in 1933, 1938 and 1941. In 1943 defending champions Schalke was knocked out in the quarter-finals by Holstein Kiel, thereby ending the clubs quest for a twelfth consecutive semi-finals appearance.

Ernst Kalwitzki of FC Schalke 04 and Herbert Binkert of 1. FC Saarbrücken were the joint top scorers for the 1943 championship with five goals each, the lowest for any top scorer since 1925. For Kalwitzki it was the third and last time, after 1937 and 1939, to finish as top scorer.

Dresdner SC became the last club to be awarded the Viktoria, the annual trophy for the German champions from 1903 to 1944. The trophy disappeared during the final stages of the war, did not resurface until after the German reunification and was put on display at the DFB headquarters in Frankfurt until 2015, when it was moved to the new Deutsches Fußballmuseum in Dortmund.

Dresdner SC completed the 1942–43 season unbeaten, finishing the Gauliga Sachsen with 18 wins out of 18 games, and winning all five games in the championship to claim the title.

== Qualified teams ==
The teams qualified through the 1942–43 Gauliga season:

Club	Qualified from
VfR Mannheim	Gauliga Baden
Berliner SV 92	Gauliga Berlin-Brandenburg
SV Neufahrwasser	Gauliga Danzig-Westpreußen
FC Mühlhausen 93	Gauliga Elsaß
SG Warschau	Gauliga Generalgouvernement
Victoria Hamburg	Gauliga Hamburg
Kickers Offenbach	Gauliga Hessen-Nassau
SV Victoria Köln	Gauliga Köln-Aachen
SV 06 Kassel	Gauliga Kurhessen
TSG Rostock	Gauliga Mecklenburg
SV Dessau 05	Gauliga Mitte
TuS Neuendorf	Gauliga Moselland
Westende Hamborn	Gauliga Niederrhein
LSV Reinicke Brieg	Gauliga Niederschlesien
1. FC Nürnberg	Gauliga Nordbayern
Germania Königshütte	Gauliga Oberschlesien
First Vienna	Gauliga Ostmark
VfB Königsberg	Gauliga Ostpreußen
LSV Pütnitz	Gauliga Pommern
Dresdner SC	Gauliga Sachsen
Holstein Kiel	Gauliga Schleswig-Holstein
TSV 1860 München	Gauliga Südbayern
MSV Brünn	Gauliga Sudetenland
Eintracht Braunschweig	Gauliga Südhannover-Braunschweig
SDW Posen	Gauliga Wartheland
SpVgg Wilhelmshaven	Gauliga Weser-Ems
Schalke 04	Gauliga Westfalen
FV Saarbrücken	Gauliga Westmark
VfB Stuttgart	Gauliga Württemberg

- Gauliga champions LSV Adler Deblin were replaced by SG Warschau.
- Stuttgarter Kickers and VfB Stuttgart finished on equal points and the same goal average and were therefore declared joint champions but only VfB advanced to the German championship.

== Competition ==
=== Qualifying round ===
Team 1	Agg.	Team 2	1st leg	2nd leg
Holstein Kiel	5–1	TSG Rostock	4–0	1–1

=== First round ===
Holstein Kiel, SpVgg Wilhelmshaven, Kickers Offenbach and Westende Hamborn received a bye for the first round.

Team 1	Score	Team 2
2 May 1943
Berliner SV 92	2–2	LSV Pütnitz
Dresdner SC	2–1	SV Dessau 05
Eintracht Braunschweig	5–1	Victoria Hamburg
FV Saarbrücken	5–1	FC Mühlhausen 93
LSV Reinecke Brieg	4–3	Germania Königshütte
Schalke 04	8–1	SV 06 Kassel
SG Warschau	3–1	DWM Posen
TSV 1860 München	3–0	VfB Stuttgart
VfB Königsberg	3–1	SV Neufahrwasser
VfR Mannheim	3–1	1. FC Nürnberg
First Vienna	5–2	MSV Brünn
SV Victoria Köln	2–0	TuS Neuendorf

==== Replay ====
Team 1	Score	Team 2
9 May 1943
Berliner SV 92	2–0	LSV Pütnitz

=== Round of 16 ===
Team 1	Score	Team 2
16 May 1943
Dresdner SC	4–0	Eintracht Braunschweig
FV Saarbrücken	5–0	SV Victoria Köln
Holstein Kiel	2–0	Berliner SV 92
Schalke 04	4–1	SpVgg Wilhelmshaven
TSV 1860 München	2–0	Kickers Offenbach
VfB Königsberg	5–1	SG Warschau
VfR Mannheim	8–1	Westende Hamborn
First Vienna	8–0	LSV Reinecke Brieg

- VfB Königsberg was disqualified and replaced by SV Neufahrwasser in the quarter-finals.

=== Quarter-finals ===
30 May 1943

SV Neufahrwasser	0 – 4	Dresdner SC
		Kugler 25', 26'; Hofmann 63'; Schaffer 70'

Danziger Stadion, Gdańsk
Attendance: 20,000
Referee: Kahaun

30 May 1943

Holstein Kiel	4 – 1	Schalke 04
Linken 9', 45'; Möschel 31'; Hain 89'		Tibulski 45' (pen.)

Holstein-Stadion, Kiel
Attendance: 18,000
Referee: Janssen

30 May 1943

First Vienna	2 – 0	TSV 1860 München
Noack 38'; Decker 60' (pen.)

Prater, Vienna
Attendance: 60,000
Referee: Reinhardt

30 May 1943

FV Saarbrücken	3 – 2	VfR Mannheim
Balzert 6'; Dorn 62'; Baier 76'		Striebinger 25', 27' (pen.)

Kieselhumes, Saarbrücken
Attendance: 25,000
Referee: Vogt

=== Semi-finals ===
13 June 1943

Dresdner SC	3 – 1	Holstein Kiel
Schön 10'; Kugler 46'; Erdl 88'		Boller 76' (pen.)

Hindenburg-Kampfbahn, Hannover
Attendance: 28,000
Referee: Schmetzer

13 June 1943

FV Saarbrücken	2 – 1	First Vienna
Binkert 20'; Sold 75'		Strittich 81'

Adolf-Hitler-Kampfbahn, Stuttgart
Attendance: 22,000
Referee: Trompetter

=== Third place play-off ===
26 June 1943

Holstein Kiel	4 – 1	First Vienna
Boller 26', 48'; Walter 73'; Möschel 74'		Strittich 27'

Olympiastadion, Berlin
Attendance: 30,000
Referee: Schumann

=== Final ===
27 June 1943

Dresdner SC	3 – 0	FV Saarbrücken
Erdl 55'; Schubert 62'; Kugler 84'	Report

Olympic Stadium (Berlin)
Attendance: 80,000
Referee: W. Raspel (Düsseldorf)

DRESDNER SC 1898:
GK	(Nazi Germany) Willibald Kreß
RB	(Nazi Germany) Herbert Pechan
CB	(Nazi Germany) Walter Dzur
LB	(Nazi Germany) Heinz Hempel (c)
RH	(Nazi Germany) Herbert Pohl
LH	(Nazi Germany) Helmut Schubert
OR	(Protectorate of Bohemia and Moravia) Heiner Kugler
IR	(Protectorate of Bohemia and Moravia) Heinrich Schaffer
CF	(Nazi Germany) Richard Hofmann
IL	(Nazi Germany) Helmut Schön
OL	(Nazi Germany) Franz Erdl
Manager:
(Nazi Germany) Georg Köhler

FV SAARBRÜCKEN:
GK	(Nazi Germany) Karl Dahlheimer
RB	(Nazi Germany) Hugo Decker
CB	(Nazi Germany) Wilhelm Sold
LB	(Nazi Germany) Heinrich Schmidt (c)
RH	(Nazi Germany) Hans-Joachim Plückhahn
LH	(Nazi Germany) Johann Herberger
OR	(Nazi Germany) Heinz Kurtsiefer
IR	(Nazi Germany) Herbert Baier
CF	(Nazi Germany) Herbert Binkert
IL	(Nazi Germany) Jakob Balzert
OL	(Nazi Germany) Herbert Dorn
Manager:
(Nazi Germany) Ernst Georg
