= 1942 German football championship =

1942 German championship
Deutsche Fußballmeisterschaft
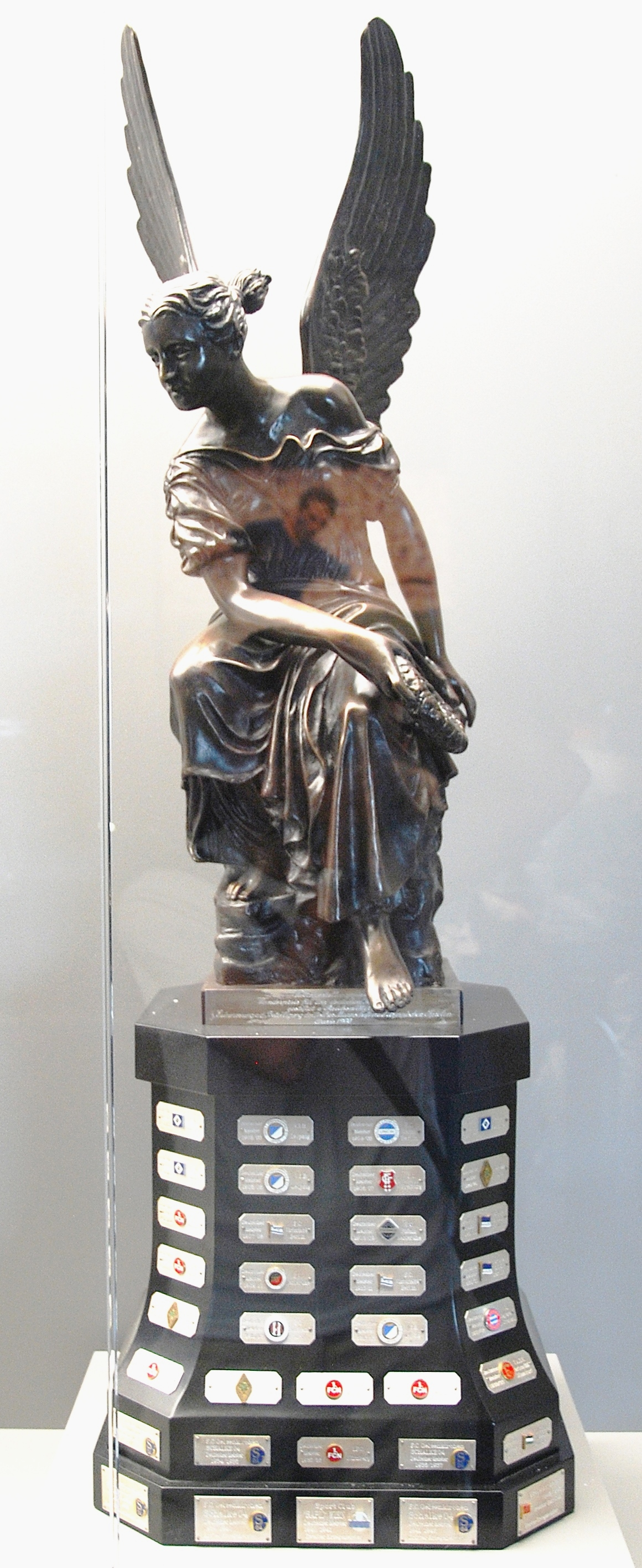
- Replica of the Viktoria trophy

Tournament details
- Country: Germany
- Dates: 10 May – 4 July
- Teams: 25

Final positions
- Champions: Schalke 04; 6th German title
- Runners-up: First Vienna
- Third place: Blau-Weiß 90 Berlin
- Fourth place: Kickers Offenbach

Tournament statistics
- Matches played: 26
- Goals scored: 120 (4.62 per match)
- Top goal scorer: Fritz Szepan (8 goals)

The 1942 German football championship, the 35th edition of the competition, was won by Schalke 04, the club's sixth championship, won by defeating First Vienna FC in the final. It marked the third and last occasion of a club from Vienna (German: Wien) in the final, Rapid Wien having won the competition in the previous season while Admira Wien had made a losing appearance in the 1939 final. It was the last time that Schalke was awarded the Viktoria, the annual trophy for the German champions from 1903 to 1944 as the trophy disappeared during the final stages of the Second World War.

Schalke's Fritz Szepan was the 1942 championships top scorer with eight goals.

The 1942 championship marked the last highlight of the golden era of Schalke 04 which had reached the semi-finals of each edition of the national championship from 1932 to 1942 and won the competition in 1934, 1935, 1937, 1939, 1940 and 1942 while losing the final in 1933, 1938 and 1941. By appearing in the 1942 final Schalke also equaled Hertha BSC's record of six consecutive final appearances which the latter had set from 1926 to 1931. Schalke would however not win another German championship until 1958.

The twenty-five 1941–42 Gauliga champions, five more than in the previous season, competed in a single-leg knock out competition to determine the national champion. In the following season, the German championship was played with twenty nine clubs. From there it gradually expanded further through a combination of territorial expansion of Nazi Germany and the sub-dividing of the Gauligas in later years, reaching a strength of thirty-one in its last completed season, 1943–44.

== Qualified teams ==
The teams qualified through the 1941–42 Gauliga season:

Club	Qualified from
SV Waldhof Mannheim	Gauliga Baden
FC Schweinfurt 05	Gauliga Bayern
Blau-Weiß 90 Berlin	Gauliga Berlin-Brandenburg
HUS Marienwerder	Gauliga Danzig-Westpreußen
SG SS Straßburg	Gauliga Elsaß
LSV Boelcke Krakau	Gauliga Generalgouvernement
Kickers Offenbach	Gauliga Hessen-Nassau
Borussia Fulda	Gauliga Kurhessen
SV Dessau 05	Gauliga Mitte
VfL 99 Köln	Gauliga Mittelrhein
FV Stadt Düdelingen	Gauliga Moselland
Sportfreunde Hamborn	Gauliga Niederrhein
Werder Bremen	Gauliga Niedersachsen
SV Breslau 02	Gauliga Niederschlesien
Eimsbütteler TV	Gauliga Nordmark
Germania Königshütte	Gauliga Oberschlesien
First Vienna	Gauliga Ostmark
VfB Königsberg	Gauliga Ostpreußen
LSV Pütnitz	Gauliga Pommern
SC Planitz	Gauliga Sachsen
LSV Olmütz	Gauliga Sudetenland
Polizei Litzmannstadt	Gauliga Wartheland
Schalke 04	Gauliga Westfalen
1. FC Kaiserslautern	Gauliga Westmark
Stuttgarter Kickers	Gauliga Württemberg

== Competition ==
=== Qualifying round ===
Team 1	Score	Team 2
10 May 1942
Blau-Weiß 90 Berlin	3–1	LSV Pütnitz
Borussia Fulda	0–2	SV Dessau 05
Sportfreunde Hamborn	1–1	Werder Bremen
HUS Marienwerder	1–7	VfB Königsberg
1. FC Kaiserslautern	7–1	SV Waldhof Mannheim
LSV Olmütz	0–1	First Vienna FC
SC Planitz	5–2	LSV Boelcke Krakau
SG SS Straßburg	2–0	Stuttgarter Kickers
FV Stadt Düdelingen	0–2	Schalke 04

==== Replay ====
Team 1	Score	Team 2
17 May 1942
Werder Bremen	5–1	Sportfreunde Hamborn

=== Round of 16 ===
Team 1	Score	Team 2
24 May 1942
SV Dessau 05	0–3	Blau-Weiß 90 Berlin
Schalke 04	9–3	1. FC Kaiserslautern
Kickers Offenbach	3–1	VfL 99 Köln
SC Planitz	2–1	SV Breslau 02
SG SS Strassburg	2–1	FC Schweinfurt 05
VfB Königsberg	8–1	Polizei Litzmannstadt
First Vienna FC	1–0	Germania Königshütte
Werder Bremen	4–2	Eimsbütteler TV

=== Quarter-finals ===
Team 1	Score	Team 2
7 June 1942
Blau-Weiß 90 Berlin	2–1	VfB Königsberg
Schalke 04	6–0	SG SS Straßburg
Kickers Offenbach	4–3	Werder Bremen
First Vienna FC	3–2	SC Planitz

=== Semi-finals ===
Team 1	Score	Team 2
21 June 1942
Blau-Weiß 90 Berlin	2–3	First Vienna FC
Schalke 04	6–0	Kickers Offenbach

=== Third place play-off ===
4 July 1942

Blau-Weiß 90 Berlin	4 – 0	Kickers Offenbach
Herberger 18'; Lay 55'; Hientz 64'; Kraetke 83'

Poststadion, Berlin
Attendance: 25,000
Referee: Rättig

=== Final ===
5 July 1942

Schalke 04	2–0	First Vienna FC
Kalwitzki 14'; Szepan 42'	Report

Olympic Stadium (Berlin)
Attendance: 90,000
Referee: F. Bouillon (Königsberg)

FC SCHALKE 04:
GK	(Nazi Germany) Heinz Flotho
RB	(Nazi Germany) Heinz Hinz
CB	(Nazi Germany) Otto Tibulsky
LB	(Nazi Germany) Otto Schweisfurth
RH	(Nazi Germany) Hans Bornemann
LH	(Nazi Germany) Herbert Burdenski
IR	(Nazi Germany) Fritz Szepan
IL	(Nazi Germany) Ernst Kuzorra (c)
OR	(Nazi Germany) Ernst Kalwitzki
CF	(Nazi Germany) Hermann Eppenhoff
OL	(Nazi Germany) Adolf Urban
Manager:
(Nazi Germany) Otto Faist

FIRST VIENNA FC 1894:
GK	(Nazi Germany) Stefan Ploc
RB	(Nazi Germany) Otto Kaller
CH	(Nazi Germany) Ernst Sabeditsch
LB	(Nazi Germany) Willibald Schmaus (c)
RH	(Nazi Germany) Vitus Kubicka
LH	(Nazi Germany) Franz Jaburek
OR	(Nazi Germany) Karl Bortoli
IR	(Nazi Germany) Karl Decker
CF	(Nazi Germany) Franz Holeschofsky
IL	(Nazi Germany) Karl Lechner
OL	(Nazi Germany) Franz Erdl
Manager:
(Nazi Germany) Fritz Gschweidl
