= 1942–43 Gauliga =

Gauliga
- Season: 1942–43
- Champions: 29 regional winners
- German champions: Dresdner SC; 1st German title

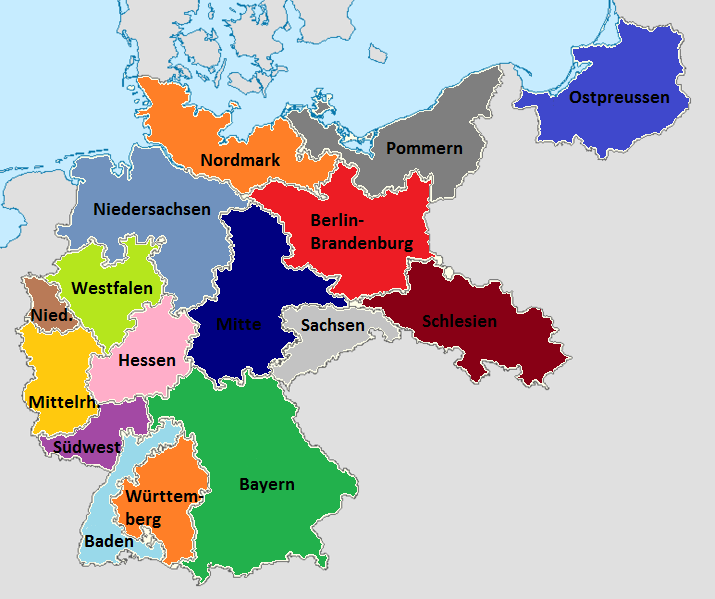
The initial 16 districts of the Gauliga from 1933 to 1938

The 1942–43 Gauliga was the tenth season of the Gauliga, the first tier of the football league system in Germany from 1933 to 1945. It was the fourth season of the league held during the Second World War.

The league operated in twenty-nine regional divisions, four more than in the previous season, with the league containing 298 clubs all up, 33 more than the previous season. The league champions entered the 1943 German football championship, won by Dresdner SC who defeated FV Saarbrücken 3–0 in the final. It was Dresden's first national championship and the club would go on to win the competition in the following season as well.

The 1942–43 season saw the ninth edition of the Tschammerpokal, now the DFB-Pokal. The 1943 edition was won by First Vienna FC, defeating Luftwaffe team LSV Hamburg 3–2 after extra time on 31 October 1943. It was the final edition of the Tschammerpokal, with the German cup not resuming until the 1950s, then under its current name.

The number of Gauligas, twenty-nine, increased by four compare to the previous season because of the sub-division of existing ones. The Gauliga Nordmark was split into the Gauliga Hamburg, Gauliga Mecklenburg and Gauliga Schleswig-Holstein while the Gauliga Bayern was split into the Gauliga Nordbayern and Gauliga Südbayern and the Gauliga Niedersachsen was split into the Gauliga Südhannover-Braunschweig and Gauliga Weser-Ems.

The 1942–43 season saw the continued participation of military and police teams, especially in the eastern regions. Gauliga champions like LSV Adler Deblin, LSV Reinicke Brieg and LSV Pütnitz were associated with the German air force, the Luftwaffe, LSV standing for Luftwaffen Sportverein while MSV Brünn was a club of the Wehrmacht. SG Warschau, in turn, was a club of the Ordnungspolizei, the uniformed police force in Nazi Germany.

In the part of Czechoslovakia annexed into Germany in March 1939, the Protectorate of Bohemia and Moravia, a separate Czech league continued to exist which was not part of the Gauliga system or the German championship.

== Champions ==
Map of Nazi Germany showing its expansion 1938 -1945

The 1942–43 Gauliga champions qualified for the knock-out stages of the German championship. Holstein Kiel finished the tournament in third place, defeating First Vienna FC 4–1 in the third-place game while FV Saarbrücken and Dresdner SC contested the final which the latter won.

FC Schalke 04 won their tenth consecutive Gauliga title, Stuttgarter Kickers their fifth, VfB Königsberg and Kickers Offenbach their fourth while LSV Pütnitz, Germania Königshütte and First Vienna FC defended their 1941–42 Gauliga title.

Club	League	No. of clubs
VfR Mannheim	Gauliga Baden	10
Berliner SV 92	Gauliga Berlin-Brandenburg	10
SV Neufahrwasser	Gauliga Danzig-Westpreußen	11
First Vienna FC	Gauliga Donau-Alpenland (1942–43 season)	11
FC Mühlhausen 93	Gauliga Elsaß	10
LSV Adler Deblin^{‡}	Gauliga Generalgouvernement	4
Victoria Hamburg	Gauliga Hamburg^{#}	10
Kickers Offenbach	Gauliga Hessen-Nassau	10
SV Victoria Köln	Gauliga Köln-Aachen	10
SV 06 Kassel	Gauliga Kurhessen	9
TSG Rostock	Gauliga Mecklenburg^{#}	10
SV Dessau 05	Gauliga Mitte	10
TuS Neuendorf	Gauliga Moselland	12
Westende Hamborn	Gauliga Niederrhein	10
LSV Reinicke Brieg	Gauliga Niederschlesien	10
1. FC Nürnberg	Gauliga Nordbayern^{#} (1942–43 season)	11
Germania Königshütte	Gauliga Oberschlesien	10
VfB Königsberg	Gauliga Ostpreußen	8
LSV Pütnitz	Gauliga Pommern	12
Dresdner SC	Gauliga Sachsen	10
Holstein Kiel	Gauliga Schleswig-Holstein^{#}	10
TSV 1860 München	Gauliga Südbayern^{#} (1942–43 season)	10
MSV Brünn	Gauliga Sudetenland	20
Eintracht Braunschweig	Gauliga Südhannover-Braunschweig^{#}	10
SDW Posen	Gauliga Wartheland	10
SpVgg Wilhelmshaven	Gauliga Weser-Ems^{#}	10
FC Schalke 04	Gauliga Westfalen	10
FV Saarbrücken	Gauliga Westmark	10
Stuttgarter Kickers & VfB Stuttgart^{†}	Gauliga Württemberg	10

- ^{‡} Gauliga champions LSV Adler Deblin were replaced in the German championship by SG Warschau.
- ^{†} Both clubs finished on equal points and with the same goal average. The two clubs were declared joint Gauliga champions but VfB Stuttgart advanced to the German championship.
- ^{#} Denotes Gauligas created through sub-division of existing Gauligas for the 1942–43 season.
