= 1941–42 Gauliga =

Gauliga
- Season: 1941–42
- Champions: 25 regional winners
- German champions: Schalke 04; 6th German title

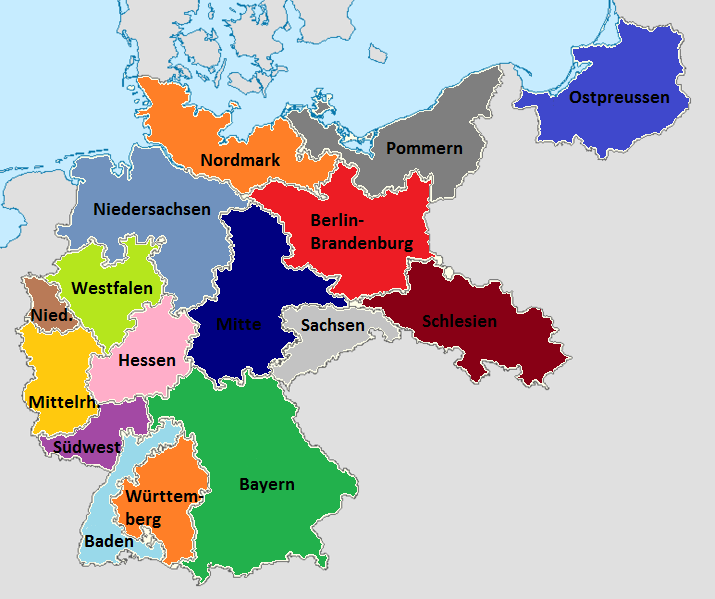
The initial 16 districts of the Gauliga from 1933 to 1938

The 1941–42 Gauliga was the ninth season of the Gauliga, the first tier of the football league system in Germany from 1933 to 1945. It was the third season of the league held during the Second World War.

The league operated in twenty-five regional divisions, five more than in the previous season, with the league containing 265 clubs all up, 40 more than the previous season. The league champions entered the 1942 German football championship, won by FC Schalke 04 who defeated First Vienna 2–0 in the final. It was Schalke's sixth German national championship and its last in the Gauliga era.

The 1941–42 season saw the eighth edition of the Tschammerpokal, now the DFB-Pokal. The 1942 edition was won by TSV 1860 München, defeating FC Schalke 04 2–0 on 15 November 1942.

The number of Gauligas, twenty-five, increased by five compare to the previous season because of the introduction of two new Gauligas and the sub-division of three existing ones. The Gauliga Wartheland, covering the Reichsgau Wartheland, and the Gauliga Generalgouvernement, covering the General Government, were created in the areas annexed by Nazi Germany and in occupied Poland. The Gauliga Generalgouvernement was only ever played as a knock-out competition of the local district champions and never in league format.

Of the sub-divided Gauligas the Gauliga Schlesien was split into the Gauliga Oberschlesien and Gauliga Niederschlesien, the Gauliga Mittelrhein was split into the Gauliga Köln-Aachen and Gauliga Moselland and the Gauliga Südwest was split into Gauliga Hessen-Nassau and Gauliga Westmark. As part of Nazi Germany's expansion in occupied Western Europe clubs from Luxembourg entered the new Gauliga Moselland while French clubs from the Lorraine region entered the new Gauliga Westmark. Luxembourgian club FV Stadt Düdelingen, known as Stade Dudelange before and after the club's participation in the German league system, went on to win the inaugural championship of the Gauliga Moselland.

The 1941–42 season saw another increase in participation of military and police teams, especially in the eastern regions. Gauliga champions like LSV Pütnitz, LSV Olmütz and LSV Boelcke Krakau were associated with the German air force, the Luftwaffe, LSV standing for Luftwaffen Sportverein. HUS Marienwerder was a club of the non-commissioned officers academy, HUS standing for Heeres-Unteroffiziers-Schule while SG SS Straßburg was associated with the SS, the Schutzstaffel. Polizei Litzmannstadt, in turn, was a club of the Ordnungspolizei, the uniformed police force in Nazi Germany.

In the part of Czechoslovakia annexed into Germany in March 1939, the Protectorate of Bohemia and Moravia, a separate Czech league continued to exist which was not part of the Gauliga system or the German championship.

== Champions ==
Map of Nazi Germany showing its expansion 1938 -1945

The 1941–42 Gauliga champions qualified for the knock-out stages of the German championship, replacing the group format of the previous Gauliga seasons. Blau-Weiß 90 Berlin finished the tournament in third place, defeating Kickers Offenbach 4–0 in the third-place game while First Vienna FC and FC Schalke 04 contested the final which the latter won.

FC Schalke 04 won their ninth consecutive Gauliga title, Stuttgarter Kickers their fourth, VfB Königsberg and Kickers Offenbach their third while SV Jena, Borussia Fulda and VfL 99 Köln defended their 1940–41 Gauliga title. However, Kickers Offenbach, Borussia Fulda and VfL 99 Köln achieved their 1941–42 titles in re-sized or renamed leagues.

Club	League	No. of clubs
SV Waldhof Mannheim	Gauliga Baden	12
FC Schweinfurt 05	Gauliga Bayern (1941–42 season)	12
Blau-Weiß 90 Berlin	Gauliga Berlin-Brandenburg	10
HUS Marienwerder	Gauliga Danzig-Westpreußen	10
First Vienna	Gauliga Donau-Alpenland^{¶} (1941–42 season)	10
SG SS Straßburg	Gauliga Elsaß	12
LSV Boelcke Krakau	Gauliga Generalgouvernement^{‡}	4
Kickers Offenbach	Gauliga Hessen-Nassau^{#}	13
VfL 99 Köln	Gauliga Köln-Aachen^{#}	9
Borussia Fulda	Gauliga Kurhessen^{†}	9
SV Dessau 05	Gauliga Mitte	10
FV Stadt Düdelingen	Gauliga Moselland^{#}	12
Sportfreunde Hamborn	Gauliga Niederrhein	10
Werder Bremen	Gauliga Niedersachsen	12
SV Breslau 02	Gauliga Niederschlesien^{#}	10
Eimsbütteler TV	Gauliga Nordmark	10
Germania Königshütte	Gauliga Oberschlesien^{#}	10
VfB Königsberg	Gauliga Ostpreußen	8
LSV Pütnitz	Gauliga Pommern	12
SC Planitz	Gauliga Sachsen	10
LSV Olmütz	Gauliga Sudetenland	18
Polizei Litzmannstadt	Gauliga Wartheland^{‡}	12
FC Schalke 04	Gauliga Westfalen	10
1. FC Kaiserslautern	Gauliga Westmark^{#}	10
Stuttgarter Kickers	Gauliga Württemberg	10

- ^{‡} Denotes newly introduced Gauligas for the 1941–42 season.
- ^{#} Denotes Gauligas created through sub-division of existing Gauligas for the 1941–42 season.
- ^{¶} Formerly the Gauliga Ostmark.
- ^{†} Formerly the Gauliga Hessen.
