= 1943–44 Gauliga =

Gauliga
- Season: 1943–44
- Champions: 31 regional winners
- German champions: Dresdner SC; 2nd German title

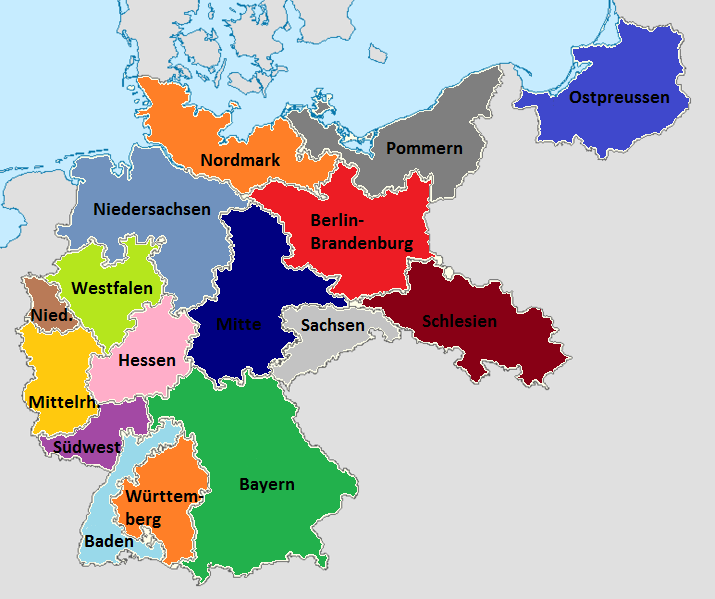
The initial 16 districts of the Gauliga from 1933 to 1938

The 1943–44 Gauliga was the eleventh season of the Gauliga, the first tier of the football league system in Germany from 1933 to 1945. It was the fifth season of the league held during the Second World War and the last completed one.

The league operated in thirty-one regional divisions, two more than in the previous season, with the league containing 358 clubs all up, 60 more than the previous season. The league champions entered the 1944 German football championship, won by Dresdner SC who defeated Luftwaffe team LSV Hamburg 4–0 in the final. It was Dresden's second national championship, having won the competition in the previous season as well.

The number of Gauligas, thirty-one, increased by two compare to the previous season because of the splitting off of the Gauliga Osthannover from the Gauliga Südhannover-Braunschweig and the creation of the Gauliga Böhmen und Mähren.

The 1943–44 season saw the continued participation of military and police teams, especially in the eastern regions. Gauliga champions like LSV Hamburg, LSV Danzig, LSV Mölders Krakau and LSV Rerick were associated with the German air force, the Luftwaffe, LSV standing for Luftwaffen Sportverein while MSV Brünn, WSV Celle and HSV Groß-Born were clubs of the Wehrmacht.

In the part of Czechoslovakia annexed into Germany in March 1939, the Protectorate of Bohemia and Moravia, a separate Czech league continued to exist which was not part of the Gauliga system or the German championship.

== Champions ==
Map of Nazi Germany showing its expansion 1938 -1945

The 1943–44 Gauliga champions qualified for the knock-out stages of the German championship. HSV Groß-Born and 1. FC Nürnberg were knocked-out in the semi-finals while LSV Hamburg and Dresdner SC contested the final which the latter won.

FC Schalke 04 won their eleventh consecutive Gauliga title, VfB Königsberg and Kickers Offenbach their fifth, Germania Königshütte and First Vienna FC their third while SDW Posen, SpVgg Wilhelmshaven, Eintracht Braunschweig, Holstein Kiel, Dresdner SC, 1. FC Nürnberg, VfR Mannheim, SV Dessau 05, TuS Neuendorf and FC Mühlhausen 93 defended their 1942–43 Gauliga title.

Club	League	No. of clubs
VfR Mannheim	Gauliga Baden	19
MSV Brünn	Gauliga Böhmen und Mähren^{†}	14
Hertha BSC	Gauliga Berlin-Brandenburg	10
LSV Danzig	Gauliga Danzig-Westpreußen	10
First Vienna FC	Gauliga Donau-Alpenland (1943–44 season)	10
FC Mühlhausen 93	Gauliga Elsaß	10
LSV Mölders Krakau	Gauliga Generalgouvernement	4
LSV Hamburg	Gauliga Hamburg	10
Kickers Offenbach	Gauliga Hessen-Nassau	10
KSG VfL 99 Köln/SpVgg Sülz 07	Gauliga Köln-Aachen	10
Borussia Fulda	Gauliga Kurhessen	8
LSV Rerick	Gauliga Mecklenburg	10
SV Dessau 05	Gauliga Mitte	10
TuS Neuendorf	Gauliga Moselland	13
KSG Duisburg	Gauliga Niederrhein	10
STC Hirschberg	Gauliga Niederschlesien	36
1. FC Nürnberg	Gauliga Nordbayern (1943–44 season)	10
Germania Königshütte	Gauliga Oberschlesien	10
WSV Celle	Gauliga Osthannover^{#}	8
VfB Königsberg	Gauliga Ostpreußen	7
HSV Groß-Born	Gauliga Pommern	12
Dresdner SC	Gauliga Sachsen	10
Holstein Kiel	Gauliga Schleswig-Holstein	10
FC Bayern Munich	Gauliga Südbayern (1943–44 season)	10
NSTG Brux	Gauliga Sudetenland	13
Eintracht Braunschweig	Gauliga Südhannover-Braunschweig	10
SDW Posen	Gauliga Wartheland	10
SpVgg Wilhelmshaven	Gauliga Weser-Ems	24
FC Schalke 04	Gauliga Westfalen	10
KSG Saarbrücken	Gauliga Westmark	10
SV Göppingen	Gauliga Württemberg	10

- ^{#} Denotes Gauliga created through sub-division of existing Gauliga for the 1943–44 season.
- ^{†} Denotes newly created Gauliga for the 1943–44 season.
