= Karl Höger =

German footballer (1897–1975)

Personal information
- Date of birth: 27 May 1897
- Place of birth: Germany
- Date of death: 31 March 1975 (aged 77)
- Position: Forward

Senior career*
Years	Team	Apps	(Gls)
1920–1921	SpTV 1877 Waldhof		
1921–1922	Bonner SC		
1922–1924	SpVgg Fürth		
1924–1926	VfR Mannheim		
1944–1945	Hamburger SV		

International career
1921–1924	Germany	4	(0)

Managerial career
- 1931–1932: Duisburger SpV
- 1935–1937: Düsseldorfer FK Fortuna 1911
- 1937–1942: SV Dessau 05
- 1942–1944: LSV Hamburg
- 1944–1945: Hamburger SV
- 1947–1958: Werder Bremen
- 1949–1950: KSV Hessen Kassel
- 1950–1952: FC Singen 04
- 1952–1954: VfB Dillingen
- 1960–1961: TuS Helene Altenessen
- * Club domestic league appearances and goals

Karl Höger (27 May 1897 – 31 March 1975) was a German football player and coach. A forward, he played for SpTV 1877 Waldhof, Bonner SC, SpVgg Fürth and VfR Mannheim. He also represented the Germany national team, winning four caps between 1921 and 1924.
