= Willy Jürissen =

German footballer

Personal information
- Date of birth: 13 May 1912
- Date of death: 30 October 1990 (aged 78)
- Position: Goalkeeper

Senior career*
Years	Team	Apps	(Gls)
- Rot-Weiß Oberhausen
- LSV Hamburg

International career
1935–1939	Germany	6	(0)
- * Club domestic league appearances and goals

Willy Jürissen (13 May 1912 – 30 October 1990) was a German international footballer. He was part of Germany's squad at the 1936 Summer Olympics, but he did not play in any matches.
