= Bayenthaler SV =

German football club

- Full name: Bayenthaler Sportverein 1920 e.V.
- Founded: 1920
- Dissolved: 1948
Home colours	Away colours

Bayenthaler SV was a German association football club from the Bayenthal district of Köln, North Rhine-Westphalia. After World War II the club joined SV Victoria Köln 1911 which in turn became part of the current-day club SC Fortuna Köln.

In 1943 SV advanced to the Gauliga Köln-Aachen (I) after finishing second in the local Bezirksliga (II) promotion round. They were immediately sent down after a seventh-place result. Following the war they played a single season (1946–47) in the Bezirksliga Rheinbezirk, Staffel 5 (I) before their merger with Victoria.

== Stadium ==
In its earliest years SV played in the Goltsteinstraße and Bonner Straße before settling into Schönhauser Straße in 1924.
