= Gauliga Böhmen und Mähren =

- Founded: 1943
- Folded: 1945
- Replaced by: Czechoslovak First League
- Country: Nazi Germany
- Protectorate: Bohemia and Moravia
- Level on pyramid: Level 1
- Domestic cup: Tschammerpokal
- Last champions: Militär SV Brünn (1943–44)

The Gauliga Böhmen und Mähren, was the highest football league in the parts of Czechoslovakia occupied by Germany on 15 March 1939 and incorporated in the Protectorate of Bohemia and Moravia (German:Protectorat Böhmen und Mähren) from 1943 to 1945. The league only existed for one complete season.

== Overview ==
The partition of Czechoslovakia from 1938 through 1939

After the German occupation the ethnically German clubs in the Protectorate initially entered the Gauliga Sudetenland. From 1943, a separate Gauliga Gauliga Böhmen und Mähren was formed by the NSRL.

The league was formed with fourteen clubs in two divisions. The two divisional champions then played a home-and-away final to determine the Gauliga champion. The winner of this competition qualified for the German championship. The clubs in the league were mostly military teams, only ethnically German clubs were permitted to take part in it. Czech clubs continued to play their own Bohemia/Moravia championship.

The league program was severely interrupted by the war and not all games were actually played in the 1943–44 season.

The imminent collapse of Nazi Germany in 1945 affected all Gauligas and its doubtful whether the 1944–45 season in the Gauliga Böhmen und Mähren got under way at all. The second season of the league was meant to operate with fifteen teams in three groups.

== Aftermath ==
At the end of the Second World War, the German population of Czechoslovakia was almost completely expelled. Only a small minority remains in what is now the Czech Republic.

All German football clubs were dissolved and the Czechoslovak First League once more became the highest level of play for the whole country, but now without any ethnically German clubs, the last of which had been relegated in 1936 from the top division.

== Winners and runners-up of the league ==
The winners and runners-up of the league:

Season	Winner	Runner-Up
1943–44	Militär SV Brünn	Luftwaffen SV Prag-Gbell
