= 1943–44 Gauliga Donau-Alpenland =

Gauliga Donau-Alpenland
- Season: 1943–44
- Champions: First Vienna FC
- Relegated: LSV Markersdorf an der Pielach; SK Amateure Steyr
- German championship: First Vienna FC

The 1943–44 Gauliga Donau-Alpenland was the sixth season of the Gauliga Donau-Alpenland, formerly the Gauliga Ostmark, the first tier of football in German-annexed Austria from 1938 to 1945.

First Vienna FC won the championship and qualified for the 1944 German football championship, reaching the quarter-finals where it lost 3–2 to eventual winners Dresdner SC.

The Gauliga Ostmark and Gauliga Donau-Alpenland titles from 1938 to 1944, excluding the 1944–45 season which was not completed, are recognised as official Austrian football championships by the Austrian Bundesliga.

== Table ==
The 1943–44 season saw two new clubs in the league, LSV Markersdorf an der Pielach and SK Amateure Steyr. Steyr withdrew from the league on 20 April 1944, had its record expunged and was relegated.

Pos	Team	Pld	W	D	L	GF	GA	GD	Pts	Promotion, qualification or relegation
1	First Vienna FC (C)	16	13	1	2	76	27	+49	27	Qualification to German championship
2	Floridsdorfer AC	16	9	4	3	43	33	+10	22	
3	Wiener AC	16	7	2	7	35	37	−2	16	
4	FC Wien	16	6	4	6	30	34	−4	16	
5	FK Austria Wien	16	8	0	8	35	41	−6	16	
6	LSV Markersdorf an der Pielach (R)	16	6	3	7	43	45	−2	15	Relegation
7	SK Rapid Wien	16	5	3	8	37	42	−5	13	
8	SC Wacker	16	4	2	10	30	51	−21	10	
9	Wiener Sportclub	16	4	1	11	26	45	−19	9	

Source: RSSSF.com
Rules for classification: 1) Points
(C) Champions; (R) Relegated

== Results ==
Home \ Away	AMA	AUS	FIR	FLO	MAR	RAP	WAK	WIE	WAC	SPO
SK Amateure Steyr		0–7	1–7			1–4	0–5	3–1	1–5	
FK Austria Wien			1–4	1–2	3–1	2–0	2–3	0–4	4–1	4–1
First Vienna FC	7–2	4–1		4–1	9–1	10–2	6–0	7–2	1–0	5–0
Floridsdorfer AC	1–1	6–1	4–1		2–1	3–2	3–0	0–0	2–2	2–1
LSV Markersdorf	5–3	2–3	5–5	7–2		2–1	2–0	3–1	0–1	3–1
SK Rapid Wien	5–1	1–2	1–3	2–2	3–3		4–4	3–0	1–2	9–4
SC Wacker	10–0	6–4	1–6	4–6	4–3	1–2		2–3	2–1	2–2
FC Wien	3–0	4–3	2–4	3–3	2–2	0–1	2–1		4–2	2–1
Wiener AC	3–1	1–2	5–4	1–0	7–6	2–4	4–0	1–1		1–5
Wiener Sportclub	3–2	1–2	1–3	3–5	1–2	2–1	1–0	1–0	1–4	

Legend: Blue = home team win; Yellow = draw; Red = away team win.
