= Ernst Plener =

German footballer

Personal information
- Full name: Ernst Plener
- Date of birth: 21 February 1919
- Place of birth: Kattowitz, Germany
- Date of death: 16 March 2007 (aged 88)
- Position: Forward

Senior career*
Years	Team	Apps	(Gls)
1937–1941	Vorwärts Gleiwitz		
1943–1944	HSV Groß Born		

International career
1940	Germany	2	(2)
- * Club domestic league appearances and goals

Ernst Plener (21 February 1919 – 16 March 2007) was a German international footballer who played for Vorwärts Gleiwitz and HSV Groß Born.
