= Ludwig Männer =

German footballer

Personal information
- Date of birth: 11 July 1912
- Date of death: 13 January 2003 (aged 90)
- Position: Midfielder

Senior career*
Years	Team	Apps	(Gls)
- Hannover 96

International career
1937–1940	Germany	5	(0)
- * Club domestic league appearances and goals

Ludwig Männer (11 July 1912 – 13 January 2003) was a German international footballer.
