= LSV Danzig =

German football club

- Full name: Luftwaffensportverein Danzig
- Founded: 1941
- Ground: Preußenplatz Bischofsberg
- 2009–10: defunct
| Home colours | Away colours |

Luftwaffensportverein Danzig was a short-lived German association football club from the city of Danzig, West Prussia (today Gdańsk, Poland). LSV was an air force (Luftwaffe) sports club that was active from 1941 to 1944 and was made up primarily of flak soldiers. During World War II it was common in Germany for military sides to take part in domestic competition. The most successful of these clubs was LSV Hamburg which appeared in the final of the Tschammerpokal, predecessor of today's German Cup, in 1943 and in the national championship final in 1944.

LSV Danzig won a promotion round playoff at the end of the 1941–42 season to advance to the first division Gauliga Danzig-Westpreußen where they captured the title in 1944. That earned the club a place in the opening round of the national playoffs where they played Hertha BSC Berlin to a scoreless draw before losing the rematch 1–7. The Gauliga Danzig-Westpreußen collapsed in September 1944 in the latter stages of the war with the club disappearing at the same time.

During the war, LSV made use of the facilities of Gedania Danzig, an ethnically-Polish club that was banned for political reasons by the Nazis in 1938.

== Honours ==
- Gauliga Danzig-Westprussen champions: 1944
