= Stefan Ploc =

Austrian footballer

Personal information
- Date of birth: 24 March 1914
- Date of death: 24 November 2003 (aged 89)
- Position: Goalkeeper

International career
Years	Team	Apps	(Gls)
1945	Austria	2	(0)

Stefan Ploc (24 March 1914 – 24 November 2003) was an Austrian footballer. He played in two matches for the Austria national football team in 1945.
