= Richard Kubus =

German footballer

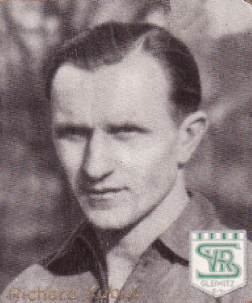

Personal information
- Date of birth: 30 March 1914
- Date of death: 1987 (aged 72–73)
- Position: Defender

Senior career*
Years	Team	Apps	(Gls)
- Vorwärts-Rasensport Gleiwitz

International career
1939	Germany	1	(0)
- * Club domestic league appearances and goals

Richard Kubus (30 March 1914 – 1987) was a German international footballer.
