= Ernst Kalwitzki =

German footballer (1909–1991)

Personal information
- Date of birth: 3 October 1909
- Place of birth: Gelsenkirchen, Germany
- Date of death: 3 February 1991 (aged 81)
- Place of death: Bremen, Germany
- Position: Right winger

Senior career*
| Years | Team | Apps | (Gls) |
| 1930–1933 | Union Gelsenkirchen | | |
| 1933–1943 | Schalke 04 | 150 | (113) |
- * Club domestic league appearances and goals

Ernst Kalwitzki (3 October 1909 – 3 February 1991) was a German footballer who played as a right winger. He played from 1933 until 1943 for FC Schalke 04. He won six German championships and one national cup with the club. In the 1939 German championship final, he scored five goals in Schalke's 9–0 victory over Admira Vienna.

== Honours ==
Schalke 04

- German Championship: 1934, 1935, 1937, 1939, 1940, 1942
- German Cup: 1937
