= Wilhelm Sold =

German footballer

Personal information
- Date of birth: 19 April 1911
- Place of birth: Saarbrücken, Germany
- Date of death: 1 September 1995 (aged 84)
- Position: Defender

Senior career*
Years	Team	Apps	(Gls)
1930–1939	FV Saarbrücken		
1939–1940	1. FC Nürnberg		
1940–1942	Tennis Borussia Berlin		
1942–1943	KSG FV/AK Saarbrücken		
1944–1945	HSV Groß Born		
1945–1948	1. FC Saarbrücken		

International career
1935–1942	Germany	12	(0)

Managerial career
- 1945–1947: 1. FC Saarbrücken
- * Club domestic league appearances and goals

Wilhelm Sold (19 April 1911 – 1 September 1995) was a German international footballer.

== International career ==
Sold won 12 caps for Germany between 1935 and 1942. He was part of Germany's squad at the 1936 Summer Olympics, but he did not play in any matches.
