= Franz Ertl =

Austrian footballer (1911-1968)

Personal information
- Date of birth: 4 May 1911
- Place of birth: Austria
- Date of death: 17 May 1968 (aged 57)
- Position: Forward

Youth career
- –1929: First Vienna

Senior career*
Years	Team	Apps	(Gls)
1929–1938	First Vienna		
1938–1942	SV Straßenbahn		
1942–1945	First Vienna		
1943	Dresdner SC		
1945–	SV Straßenbahn		

International career
1933–1936	Austria	3	(1)
- * Club domestic league appearances and goals

Franz Ertl (4 May 1911 – 17 May 1968) was an Austrian international footballer.
