= Eintracht Duisburg 1848 =

German association football club

Eintracht Duisburg
- Full name: Eintracht Duisburg 1848 e.V.
- Founded: 1848 (TuS Duisburg 1848); 1 July 1964 (merger of TuS Duisburg 48/99 and Duisburger SV)
- Ground: Leichtathletikstadion Duisburg
- Capacity: 2,500
- Chairman: Dietmar Rudat
- Head coach men Head coach women: Sascha Engeln; Dominic Linden
- League: Kreisliga B Gruppe 1
- 2023–24: 8th
- Website: https://www.eintracht-duisburg.org
Home colours	Away colours

Eintracht Duisburg is a German sports club from the city of Duisburg, North Rhine-Westphalia. Founded in 1848, it is one of the country's oldest sport associations.

== History ==
The club originated in a coming together of a number of earlier clubs, the most important of these being the Duisburger Turngemeinde für Erwachsene von 1848 – predecessor of the Duisburger Spielverein – and TuS Duisburg 48/99. It was these two sides that fused to create today's club on 24 July 1964.

=== Duisburger Spielverein ===
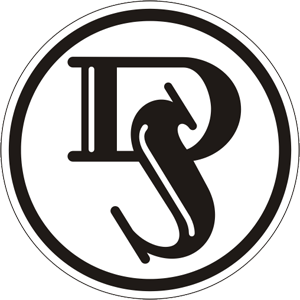
Logo of Duisburger SV ca. 1931.

Duisburger SV was one of the most successful sides of early football in western Germany. The team was formed out of Duisburger TfE on 22 March 1900 on the initiative of Gottfried Hinz, who would later go on to become president of the German Football Association (Deutscher Fußball Bund). Between 1900 and 1913, SV made regular appearances in the national playoffs, twice advancing to the semi-finals, and contesting the final in 1913 against VfB Leipzig, losing 1–3. The club played as a strong side into the late 20s winning a total of ten West German championships between 1904 and 1927.

After their final championship the club faded from prominence. They did not re-appear in upper-tier football until after World War II when they advanced to play in the Oberliga West in 1949. Generally a mid-table side, the club's best result was a second-place finish in 1957 and, except for a short period from 1951 to 1954, DSV played first division football until 1962. A last-place result that season ensured the team would not be part of the newly formed sixteen-team Bundesliga, Germany's first professional league, going on to play instead in the Regionalliga West (II).

=== TuS Duisburg 48/99 ===
The origins of TuS Duisburg 48/99 go back to the founding in 1899 of Duisburger Fussball Klub. In 1903, this club merged with SV Viktoria 1893 to create Duisburger SV Viktoria 1899. They were joined in 1921 by five-month-old Turn-Borussia Duisburg thereby becoming TuS.

The earliest of Eintracht's predecessor sides, Duisburger TSV 1848 then gave rise to two separate clubs in 1923 with the gymnasts forming Duisburger TV 1848 and the footballers forming Duisburger TSV 1899. This football club played two seasons in the Gauliga Niederrhein, one of sixteen top-flight divisions formed in the 1933 re-organization of German football under the Third Reich, before being relegated.

TuS 48/99 then made its own appearance in the Gauliga earning a second-place finish in the 1936–37 season, only a single point behind division winners TSV Fortuna Düsseldorf. The following season TSV and TuS were directed by Nazi sport authorities to merge to play as TuS Duisburg 48/99. This team struggled, several times narrowly missing relegation, until another second-place result in 1942.

World War II had a significant impact on German football often leading to the merger of teams weakened in the conflict. In 1943 the wartime side (Kriegsspielgemeinschaft) KSG SpV/48/99 Duisburg was created out of TuS 48/99 and Duisburger SpV. This combined club captured the division title before going out in the second round of the national playoffs to the era's powerhouse FC Schalke 04. The following year the Gauliga Niederrhein collapsed as Allied armies advanced into Germany.

DSV and TuS re-emerged as separate sides after the war. TuS disappeared into relative obscurity in local play while DSV went on to play in the first division Oberliga West, making a short two-season appearance there in the early 50s before settling into top flight play by the middle of the decade. The club again earned a second-place result in 1957, this time behind eventual national champions Borussia Dortmund.

=== Merger ===
After their last place finish in 1962 and fall out of first division play, DSV joined TuS 48/99 to form Eintracht Duisburg the following season in a failed attempt to revive the fortunes of these two sides. By the late 70s the combined club had fallen to the Landesliga Niederrhein (IV) and by the turn of the millennium they were toiling in the Kreisliga B Duisburg (VIII).

== Honours ==
=== Duisburger SV ===
- German championship
  - Runners-up: 1913
- Western German football championship
  - Champions: 1904, 1905, 1908, 1910, 1911, 1913, 1914, 1921, 1924, 1925, 1927
