= Gauliga Generalgouvernement =

- Founded: 1940
- Folded: 1944
- Replaced by: definitively dissolved
- Country: Nazi Germany
- Region: General Government
- Level on pyramid: Level 1
- Domestic cup: Bernsteinpokal

The Gauliga Generalgouvernement was the highest football league in Polish areas annexed by Nazi Germany in October 1939 in the so-called General Government (German:Generalgouvernement). The league existed from 1940 to 1944, in 1941 it was incorporated into the German football championship system.

== Overview ==
In the summer of 1940, the sports department of the German government in occupied Poland organised the first football championship for German clubs in the General Government (GG). These were all clubs that had been newly founded. They included military teams from the Wehrmacht units, squadrons of the Luftwaffe, the Waffen SS and the Ordnungspolizei; occupying authorities such as the Reichspost (mail service) and the Ostbahn (Eastern Railway) also took part, as did large companies under German control, particularly in the armaments sector. In 1940, a total of 80 German football clubs were registered in the General Government.

Only Reichsdeutsche and Volksdeutsche were eligible to play. Poles were not allowed to participate in organised sport, all Polish clubs and societies were dissolved and banned. Several teams signed former Polish national players who came from the Eastern part of Upper Silesia; they had been born as citizens of Prussia, but became Polish citizens when their home region was annexed to Poland in 1922. They were categorised as volksdeutsch (ethnic German) by the occupying authorities.

In the major cities, the German teams played in the stadiums of the officially disbanded Polish top clubs, including the Wisla Stadium in Kraków. Construction work on the much larger Kraków Municipal Stadium, which was almost completed on the eve of the war, was finished in 1940, and under the name "Deutsche Kampfbahn" (German battle ground) it became the venue for most of the final matches for the championship and the Bernsteinpokal (Amber Cup), the cup of the General Government. The officer responsible for the "Wehrmacht Stadium" in Warsaw, where Legia Warsaw had previously played its home matches, was captain Wilm Hosenfeld whom Roman Polański would later commemorate in his film The Pianist (2002).

For the first two seasons, a champion was determined in the four districts of Kraków, Lublin, Radom and Warsaw. The winners of these four districts determined the champion of the Gauliga in the cup system. In 1942, the newly created District of Galicia was added. From 1942 onwards, the final round was played between the five district champions in a league system (each against each). The winner of the finals went on to the German championship.

Following a decision by the National Socialist League of the Reich for Physical Exercise, the Gauliga Generalgouvernement adapted its seasons, which previously ran from January to December each year, to structures within the Reich. This meant that the 1942 season was followed by the 1943/44 season; as a result, the championship title was not awarded in 1943. In view of Germany's unfavourable situation on the Eastern Front, Gauliga matches were discontinued after the 1943/44 season.

== Winners and runners-up of the league ==
The winners and runners-up of the league:

Season	Winner	Runner-Up
1940	LSV Deblin	LSV Radom
1941	LSV Boelcke Krakau	LSV Warschau
1942	LSV Adler Deblin	SS- u. Pol.-SG Warschau
1943–44	LSV Mölders Krakau	LSV Deblin

== Bernsteinpokal ==
The Bernsteinpokal (Amber Cup) was played between the teams in the Gauliga and was donated by the Governor General Hans Frank. The cup winners and the defeated finalists:

- 1940 – SS- u. Pol.-SG Warschau – LSV Warschau-Okecie 5:1
- 1941 – DTSG Krakau – LSV Warschau 6:0
- 1942 – DTSG Tschenstochau – DSG Reichshof 2:1
- 1943 – LSV Mölders Krakau – WH Zel Praga Warschau 2:1
- 1944 – LSV Mölders Krakau – WH Zel Praga Warschau 3:2

== Prominent players ==
The clubs and military teams in the Gauliga were recruited from guest players who only played for them temporarily, sometimes only for a few weeks. Formally, they continued to belong to their home clubs in Germany. The overwhelming majority were soldiers of the Wehrmacht or the Waffen-SS whose units had been transferred to locations in occupied Poland. Among them were some national players. The Upper Silesians who had played in Polish clubs before the war had also been drafted into the Wehrmacht. Among the best known footballers in the General Government were

- Willi Arlt – (SC Riesa / DSG Reichshof)
- Franz „Bimbo“ Binder – (Rapid Wien / DSG Reichshof)
- Friedo Dörfel – (Hamburger SV / DTSG Przemysl)
- Wilhelm Gora – (KS Cracovia / DTSG Krakau)
- Rudolf Gramlich – (Eintracht Frankfurt / SS-SG Krakau)
- Franz Hofer – (Rapid Wien / DSG Reichshof)
- Adolf Huber – (Austria Wien / DSG Reichshof)
- Juliusz Joksch – (KS Warszawianka / DTSG Krakau)
- Stanislaus Kobierski – (Fortuna Düsseldorf / SS- u. Pol.-SG Warschau)
- Richard Kubus – (Vorwärts-Rasensport Gleiwitz / LSV Warschau-Okecie)
- Ludwig Männer – (Hannover 96 / WH I Warschau)
- Edmund Majowski – (Pogoń Lwów / DTSG Krakau, DTSG Lemberg)
- Andreas Munkert – (1. FC Nürnberg / SS- u. Pol.-SG Warschau)
- Herbert Panse – (Eimsbütteler TV / Fort Bema)
- Karol Pazurek – (Polonia Warsaw / DTSG Krakau)
- Alwin Riemke – (1. FC Nürnberg / LSV Adler Deblin)
- Ernst Sabeditsch – (First Vienna FC / WH Rembertow)
- Heinrich Spodzieja – (Germania Königshütte / LSV Mölders Krakau)
- Johann Urbanek – (Admira Wien / LSV Mölders Krakau)
- Rudolf Viertl (SC Germania Schwechat / DTSG Krakau)
- Ernst Willimowski – (TSV 1860 München / LSV Mölders Krakau)

== Sources ==
All match reports and results lists can be found in the Krakauer Zeitung published by the administration of the General Government, whose regional edition for the northernmost district is called the Warschauer Zeitung. The sports sections of both newspapers are identical. The Warschauer Zeitung has been digitised by the Mazovian Voivodeship digital library, access is free.
