= Gauliga Mittelrhein =

Gauliga Mittelrhein Gauliga Köln-Aachen Gauliga Moselland
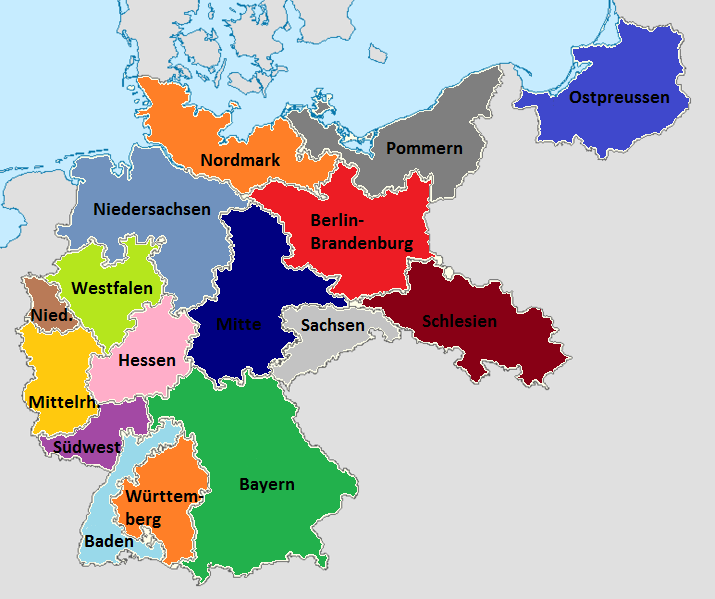
- Founded: 1933
- Folded: 1945 (12 seasons)
- Replaced by: Oberliga West
- Country: Nazi Germany
- Provinces, Countries and Regions: Rhine Province; Luxembourg (from 1941); Eupen-Malmedy (from 1941)
- Gau (from 1934): Gau Köln-Aachen; Gau Moselland
- Level on pyramid: Level 1
- Domestic cup: Tschammerpokal
- Last champions: Gauliga Köln-Aachen: KSG VfL 99 Köln/SpVgg Sülz 07; Gauliga Moselland: TuS Neuendorf (1943-44)

The Gauliga Mittelrhein was the highest football league in the central and southern part of the Prussian Rhine Province from 1933 to 1945. Shortly after the formation of the league, the Nazis reorganised the administrative regions in Germany, and the Gaue Köln-Aachen and Moselland replaced the Prussian province in the Middle Rhine (German: Mittelrhein) region.

From 1941, the Gauliga Mittelrhein was split into two separate leagues, the Gauliga Köln-Aachen and the Gauliga Moselland. From this time, it also included clubs from the occupied Luxembourg and the Belgian region of Eupen-Malmedy.

== Overview ==
=== Gauliga Mittelrhein ===
The league was introduced by the Nazi Sports Office in 1933, after the Nazi takeover of power in Germany. It replaced the Bezirksligas and Oberligas as the highest level of play in German football competitions.

In its first season, the league had eleven clubs, playing each other once at home and once away. The league champion then qualified for the German championship. The bottom three teams were relegated. The season after, the league was reduced to ten teams and remained at this strength until 1939. From 1937, it also included Alemannia Aachen which had previously belonged to the Gauliga Niederrhein.

Due to the outbreak of World War II in 1939, the league was split into two regional groups, a northern division of seven and a southern of six clubs. The two group champions then played a home-and-away final for the Gauliga championship.

In its last season, 1940–41, the league returned to a single-division, ten-team format. At the end of this season, the league was split into two separate Gauligas, divided along the administrative divisions of the two Gaue.

=== Gauliga Köln-Aachen ===
The territory of the new Gauliga Köln-Aachen was made up of the area of the Gau Köln-Aachen and the Eupen-Malmedy region, the German-speaking part of Belgium which had been annexed to the Gau after the German victory in 1940. However, no club from this formerly Belgian region played at highest level during the war.

The league started with nine clubs in a single division in 1941 and expanded to ten for the 1942–43 season. In its last completed season, 1943–44, it returned to a strength of nine teams. There is no record of play in the 1944–45 season as war overtook the region, including the conquest of Aachen by the allied forces.

=== Gauliga Moselland ===
The territory of the new Gauliga Moselland was made up of the area of the Gau Moselland and Luxembourg, which had been annexed by Germany in 1940 and added to the Gau.

The league started out with two regional divisions of six clubs each with a home-and-away final to determine the Gauliga champion. The western group compromised two clubs from the city of Trier and four Luxembourgian clubs. The league modus remained the same for the 1942–43 season but the number of clubs from Luxembourg increased to five.

In the 1943–44 season, the eastern group comprised five teams while the western had seven clubs. There is no record of a 1944–45 season as allied forces had arrived in the region in late 1944.

=== Aftermath ===
With the end of the Nazi era, the Gauligas ceased to exist and the northern part of the region found itself in the British occupation zone while the south became part of the French zone. The annexed regions of Belgium and Luxembourg were taken from Germany again after 1945.

The Oberliga Südwest was introduced as the highest football league in the French occupation zone in 1945, replacing the Gauliga. The territory of the pre-1940 Gau Moselland became part of the new state of Rhineland-Palatinate.

In the British zone, which the former Gau Köln-Aachen was part of, top-level football did not resume straight away, unlike in Southern Germany, and only in 1947 was a new, highest league introduced, the Oberliga West, which covered all of the new state of North Rhine-Westphalia.

== Founding members of the league ==
The eleven founding members and their league positions in the 1932–33 season were:

- Mülheimer SV 06
- VfR 04 Köln
- SpVgg Sülz 07, champion Rhein division
- Eintracht Trier
- Bonner FV
- SV Westmark 05 Trier
- Kölner CfR
- Kölner SC 99
- FV 1911 Neuendorf
- Fortuna Kottenheim, champion Mittelrhein division
- SV Rhenania Köln

== Winners and runners-up of the league ==
The winners and runners-up of the league:

=== Gauliga Mittelrhein ===
| Season | Winner | Runner-Up |
|---|---|---|
| 1933-34 | Mülheimer SV 06 | VfR 04 Köln |
| 1934-35 | VfR 04 Köln | Kölner CfR |
| 1935-36 | Kölner CfR | Tura 04 Bonn |
| 1936-37 | VfR 04 Köln | Kölner CfR |
| 1937-38 | SV Beuel 06 | Alemannia Aachen |
| 1938-39 | SpVgg Sülz 07 | SSV Troisdorf 05 |
| 1939-40 | Mülheimer SV 06 | SSV Troisdorf 05 |
| 1940-41 | VfL Köln 99 | VfR 04 Köln |

=== Gauliga Köln-Aachen ===
| Season | Winner | Runner-Up |
|---|---|---|
| 1941-42 | VfL Köln 99 | VfR 04 Köln |
| 1942-43 | SV Victoria 11 Köln | VfR 04 Köln |
| 1943-44 | KSG VfL 99 Köln/SpVgg Sülz 07 | SG Düren 99 |

=== Gauliga Moselland ===
| Season | Winner | Runner-Up |
|---|---|---|
| 1941-42 | FV Stadt Düdelingen | Eintracht Kreuznach |
| 1942-43 | TuS Neuendorf | FK Niederkorn |
| 1943-44 | TuS Neuendorf | SV Schwarz-Weiß Esch |

== Placings in the league 1933-44 ==
The complete list of all clubs participating in the league:

=== Gauliga Mittelrhein & Köln-Aachen ===
| Club | 1934 | 1935 | 1936 | 1937 | 1938 | 1939 | 1940 | 1941 | 1942 | 1943 | 1944 |
|---|---|---|---|---|---|---|---|---|---|---|---|
| Mülheimer SV 06 ^{3} | 1 | 5 | 4 | 6 | 4 | 7 | 1 | 4 | 3 | 4 | |
| VfR 04 Köln ^{3} | 2 | 1 | 7 | 1 | 8 | 5 | 4 | 2 | 2 | 2 | |
| SpVgg Sülz 07 ^{3} | 3 | 3 | 6 | 3 | 7 | 1 | 2 | 6 | 7 | 9 | |
| Eintracht Trier | 4 | 8 | 10 | | | | | | | | |
| Bonner FV ^{3} | 5 | 7 | 3 | 7 | 9 | | 2 | 7 | 9 | 5 | |
| Westmark Trier | 6 | 4 | 9 | | | | | | | | |
| Kölner CfR ^{1} | 7 | 2 | 1 | 2 | | | | | | | |
| Kölner SC 99 ^{1} | 8 | 6 | 5 | 9 | | | | | | | |
| Fortuna Kottenheim | 9 | | | | | | | | | | |
| Rhenania Köln | 10 | | | | | | | | | | |
| Blau-Weiß Köln | | 9 | | | | | | | | | |
| 1. FC Idar | | 10 | | | | | | | | | |
| Tura 04 Bonn ^{3} | | | 2 | 8 | 6 | 3 | 3 | 8 | | | |
| TuS Neuendorf | | | 8 | 10 | | 9 | 6 | | | | |
| Rhenania Würselen | | | | 4 | 5 | 4 | 6 | | 8 | | |
| SV Beuel 06 ^{4} | | | | 5 | 1 | 8 | 4 | 10 | | | |
| SpVgg Andernach ^{2} | | | | 11 | | | 5 | 9 | | | |
| Alemannia Aachen ^{4} | | | | | 2 | 10 | 7 | | | 6 | 4 |
| VfL 99 Köln ^{1} ^{3} | | | | | 3 | 6 | 3 | 1 | 1 | 3 | |
| Kölner BC | | | | | 10 | | | | | | |
| SSV Troisdorf | | | | | | 2 | 1 | 5 | 6 | | |
| SG Düren 99 | | | | | | | 5 | 3 | 4 | 8 | 2 |
| SV Victoria 11 Köln | | | | | | | | | 5 | 1 | 5 |
| SSV Vingst 05 | | | | | | | | | | 7 | 9 |
| LSV Bonn | | | | | | | | | | 10 | 10 |
| KSG VfL 99 Köln/SpVgg Sülz 07 ^{3} | | | | | | | | | | | 1 |
| KSG VfR/Mülheimer SV ^{3} | | | | | | | | | | | 3 |
| Kohlscheider BC | | | | | | | | | | | 6 |
| SV Bayenthal | | | | | | | | | | | 7 |
| KSG Bonn ^{3} | | | | | | | | | | | 8 |

- ^{1} In May 1937, SC 99 Köln and CfR Köln merged to form VfL 99 Köln.
- ^{2} SpVgg Andernach joined the new Gauliga Moselland in 1941.
- ^{3} The following “war sport unions” (German: KSG) were formed between clubs in 1943:
  - VfL 99 Köln and SpVgg Sülz 07 formed KSG VfL 99 Köln/SpVgg Sülz 07.
  - VfR Köln and SV Mülheim formed KSG VfR/Mülheimer SV.
  - Bonner FV and TuRa Bonn formed KSG Bonn.
- ^{4} Title awarded to SV Beuel 06 after the end of season, however, Alemannia Aachen took part in the German championship.

=== Gauliga Moselland ===
| Club | 1942 | 1943 | 1944 |
|---|---|---|---|
| Eintracht Kreuznach | 1 | 2 | 2 |
| TuS Neuendorf | 2 | 1 | 1 |
| SpVgg Andernach | 3 | 3 | |
| FV Engers 07 | 4 | 5 | 5 |
| VfB Lützel | 5 | | |
| Viktoria Neuwied | 6 | 6 | 6 |
| FV Stadt Düdelingen | 1 | 3 | 2 |
| Moselland Luxemburg | 2 | 4 | 5 |
| SV Düdelingen | 3 | 2 | 4 |
| SV Schwarz-Weiß Esch | 4 | 5 | 1 |
| Eintracht Trier ^{4} | 5 | 6 | |
| Westmark Trier ^{4} | 6 | | |
| Germania Mudersbach | | 4 | 4 |
| FK Niederkorn | | 1 | 3 |
| Reichsbahn SG Betzdorf | | | 3 |
| Schwarz-Weiß Wasserbillig | | | 6 |
| KSG Trier ^{4} | | | 7 |

- ^{4} Eintracht Trier and Westmark Trier formed KSG Trier for the 1943–44 season.

== Clubs from Luxembourg in the Gauliga Moselland ==
From 1941, clubs from the occupied country of Luxembourg took part in the German Gauliga system. The most successful of those was the FV Stadt Düdelingen, who reached the German championship finals round, losing to the FC Schalke 04 0–2 in 1942.

The following clubs played in the Gauliga under their Germanised names:

- FV Stadt Düdelingen, was Stade Dudelange
- FK Niederkorn, was Progrès Niedercorn
- Moselland Luxemburg, was Spora Luxembourg
- SV Düdelingen, was US Dudelange
- SV Schwarz-Weiß Esch, was Jeunesse d'Esch
- Schwarz-Weiß Wasserbillig, was Jeunesse Wasserbillig
