= Gauliga Hessen =

Gauliga Hessen Gauliga Kurhessen
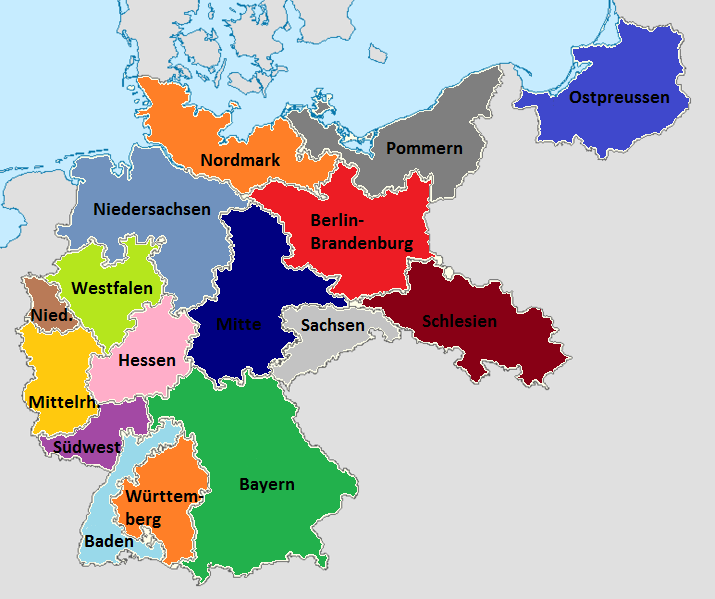
- Founded: 1933
- Folded: 1945 (12 seasons)
- Replaced by: Oberliga Süd
- Country: Nazi Germany
- State and Province: People's State of Hesse; Hesse-Nassau
- Gau (from 1934): Gau Electoral Hesse
- Level on pyramid: Level 1
- Domestic cup: Tschammerpokal
- Last champions: Reichsbahn SG Borussia Fulda (1943-44)

The Gauliga Hessen was the highest football league in the German state of Hesse and the Prussian province of Hesse-Nassau from 1933 to 1945. From 1941, it was renamed Gauliga Kurhessen. Shortly after the formation of the league, the Nazis reorganised the administrative regions in Germany, and the Gau Electoral Hesse replaced the Prussian province and the Peoples State.

== Overview ==
The league was introduced by the Nazi Sports Office in 1933, after the Nazi take over of power in Germany and Baden. It replaced the Bezirksliga as the highest level of play in German football competitions.

The Gauliga Hessen was established with ten clubs, all from the region of Hesse.

The Gauliga replaced as such the Bezirksliga Main-Hessen and Bezirksliga Hessen-Hannover, the highest leagues in the region until then. As such, it mixed clubs which had previously belonged to different Football Associations, the Southern German FA (Main/Hessen) and the West German FA (Hessen/Hannover).

The region it covered was never particularly successful in German football and this didn't change with the establishment of the Gauliga. No club from this league reached any German cup or championship final in this period.

In its first season, the league had ten clubs, playing each other once at home and once away. The league winner qualified for the German championship while the bottom two teams were relegated. The league remained unchanged until the outbreak of World War II.

In 1939-40 and 1940–41, the league played in two separate groups of six teams with a home-and-away final at the end to determine the leagues champion.

In 1941, the league returned to a single-division format and renamed Gauliga Kurhessen, but with only nine clubs. Also, some of the clubs from the south, like FC Hanau 93, left the league for the new Gauliga Hessen-Nassau. The 1942–43 season was played in the same modus.

The worsening war situation and lack of players forced many clubs to merge and form KSG's, Kriegsspielgemeinschaften (combined wartime side) and therefore the league only had seven clubs in 1943–44.

For the Gauligas final season, it was split in three regional divisions with a varying number of clubs.

The imminent collapse of Nazi Germany in 1945 gravely affected all Gauligas and football in Hessen ceased in early 1945 with none of the groups having absolved their full program.

With the end of the Nazi era, the Gauligas ceased to exist. In the US occupation zone, which the newly created federal state of Hessen was part of, the Oberliga Süd was formed in late 1945, to replace this league.

== Founding members of the league ==
The ten founding members and their positions in the 1932-33 Bezirksliga Main/Hessen and Bezirksliga Hessen/Hannover season were:

- Borussia Fulda, winner Hessen division
- VfB Friedberg, 10th Main division
- FC Hanau 93, 9th Main division
- Kurhessen Kassel, Hessen division
- CSC 03 Kassel, Hessen division
- SG Hessen Hersfeld, Hessen division
- SV 06 Kassel, Hessen division
- BC Sport Kassel, Hessen division
- VfB Marburg, Hessen division
- Hermannia Kassel, Hessen division

== Winners and runners-up of the Gauliga Hessen ==
The winners and runners-up of the league:

Season	Winner	Runner-Up
1933-34	Borussia Fulda	VfB Friedberg
1934-35	FC Hanau 93	Borussia Fulda
1935-36	FC Hanau 93	Borussia Fulda
1936-37	SV 06 Kassel	SG Hessen Hersfeld
1937-38	FC Hanau 93	CSC 03 Kassel
1938-39	CSC 03 Kassel	FC Hanau 93
1939-40	CSC 03 Kassel	FC Hanau 93
1940-41	Borussia Fulda	BC Sport Kassel
1941-42	Borussia Fulda	Kurhessen Kassel
1942-43	SV 06 Kassel	VfL Marburg
1943-44	Reichsbahn SG Borussia Fulda	SV Niederzwehren

== Placings in the Gauliga Hessen and Kurhessen 1933-44 ==
The complete list of all clubs participating in the league:

Club	1934	1935	1936	1937	1938	1939	1940	1941	1942	1943	1944
Borussia Fulda ^{3}	1	2	2	8	10		3	1	1	3	1
VfB Friedberg	2	6	8	6	5	6					
FC Hanau 93 ^{1}	3	1	1	5	1	2	1	2			
Kurhessen Kassel ^{2}	4	8	9			7	5	4	2	7	
CSC 03 Kassel ^{2}	5	4	3	3	2	1	1	2	4	5	
SG Hessen Hersfeld	6	7	4	2	4	3	4				
SV 06 Kassel	7	3	7	1	3	4	2	3	5	1	5
BC Sport Kassel ^{2}	8	10			8	9	3	1	3	4	
VfB Marburg	9		6	9							
Hermania Kassel	10							5	8	6	6
Germania Fulda		5	5	7	9						
SpVgg Langenselbold		9						6			
SV Bad Nauheim			10								
Kewa Wachenbuchen				4	7	10	6				
SV Niederzwehren				10						9	2
VfB Großauheim ^{1}					6	5	2	3			
Dunlop Hanau ^{1}						8	5	5			
VfL/TuRa Kassel ^{2}							6				
TSV 1860 Hanau ^{1}							4	4			
VfL Marburg									6	2	4
BV 06 Kassel ^{2}									7	8	
SV Petersberg									9		
KSG Kurhessen/SC 03 Kassel ^{2}											3
KSG TuRa/TuSpo 86/09 Kassel ^{2}											7
KSG BC Sport/BV 06 Kassel ^{2}											8

- ^{1} These four clubs joined the new Gauliga Hessen-Nassau in 1941.
- ^{2} In 1943, a number of clubs from Kassel formed “war sport unions” (German: KSG), those being:
  - Kurhessen and SC 03 formed KSG Kurhessen/SC 03 Kassel.
  - TuRa and TuSpo formed KSG TuRa/TuSpo 86/09 Kassel.
  - BC Sport and BV 06 formed KSG BC Sport/BV 06 Kassel.
- ^{3} Played in 1943-44 as Reichsbahn SG Borussia Fulda.
