= 1944–45 Gauliga =

Gauliga
- Season: 1944–45
- Champions: Not completed
- German champions: Not held

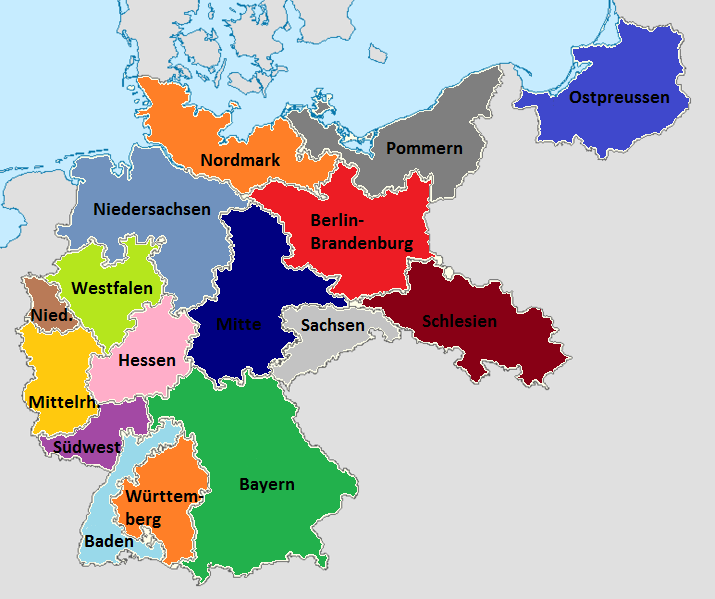
The initial 16 districts of the Gauliga from 1933 to 1938

The 1944–45 Gauliga was the twelfth and final season of the Gauliga, the first tier of the football league system in Germany from 1933 to 1945. It was the sixth season of the league held during the Second World War but was not completed as Nazi Germany surrendered on 8 May 1945.

== Cancellation ==
The league operated in a large number of regional divisions, the effects of the war having forced a further regionalisation.

The effects of the war led to the cancellation of all Gauliga competition and various stages from September 1944 onwards. In Southern Germany competitions continued up to almost the end of the war. Only the Gauliga Hamburg had an official champion recorded with Hamburger SV winning the competition.

The last recorded official Gauliga game was Munich derby between FC Bayern and 1860 Munich on 23 April 1945, ending 3–2.

League football soon resumed in post-war Germany in mostly regional competitions. In the American occupation zone, in Southern Germany the tier one Oberliga Süd kicked off with the approval of the US occupation authorities on 4 November 1945.

== German championship ==
The league champions would have qualified for the 1945 German football championship, but the competition was not held, with the next edition being in 1948.
