= Gauliga Mitte =

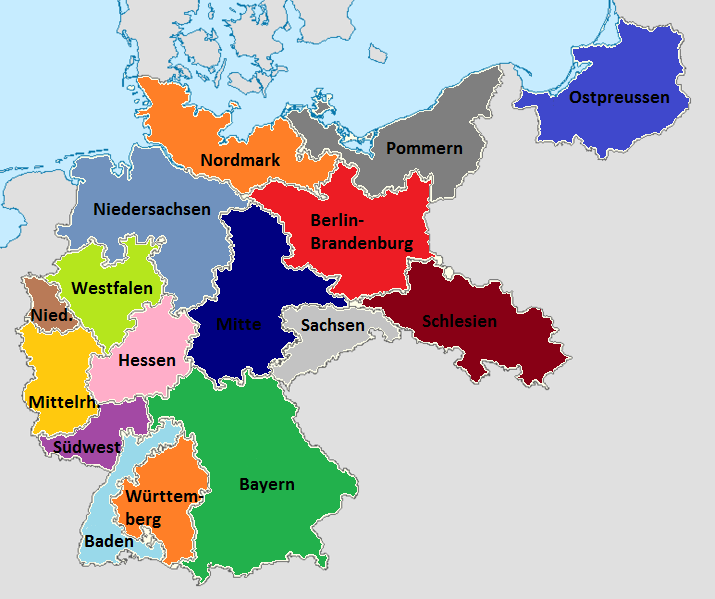
- Founded: 1933
- Folded: 1945
- Replaced by: DDR-Oberliga
- Country: Nazi Germany
- States and Provinces: Thuringia; Free State of Anhalt; Province of Saxony
- Gau (from 1934): Gau Thuringia; Gau Halle-Merseburg; Gau Magdeburg-Anhalt
- Level on pyramid: Level 1
- Domestic cup: Tschammerpokal
- Last champions: SV Dessau 05 (1943-44)

The Gauliga Mitte was the highest football league in the Prussian province of Saxony and the German states of Thuringia and Anhalt from 1933 to 1945, all located in the center (German:Mitte) of Germany. Shortly after the formation of the league, the Nazis reorganised the administrative regions in Germany, and the Gaue Thuringia, Magdeburg-Anhalt and Halle-Merseburg replaced the states and Prussian province.

== Overview ==
The league was introduced by the Nazi Sports Office in 1933, after the Nazi takeover of power in Germany. It replaced the Bezirksligas and Oberligas as the highest level of play in German football competitions.

Until the formation of the Gauliga, the region was covered by a number of local leagues and, together with clubs from state of Saxony, they played out a Central German championship (German: Mittel-Deutsche Meisterschaft).

In its first season, the league had ten clubs, playing each other once at home and once away. The league champion then qualified for the German championship. The bottom two teams were relegated. The league operated on the same modus until the outbreak of World War II in 1939.

Due to the effects of the war, the 1939–40 and 1940–41 seasons were played with only eight clubs. In 1941, the league returned to a ten-club strength, which it retained until 1944.

The imminent collapse of Nazi Germany in 1945 gravely affected all Gauligas and football in the region was split into six regional groups. However, none of them played more than a few games before the arrival of the Red Army, and the end of the war ended all competitions.

== Aftermath ==
With the end of the Nazi era, the Gauligas ceased to exist and the region found itself in the Soviet occupation zone. The DDR-Oberliga was formed in the following years as the highest level of play in the new country of East Germany and the region became part of the East German football league system.

Virtually all football clubs in the region were dissolved and replaced with clubs controlled by the new communist government. Of those, some readopted the pre-1945 names after the German reunification in 1990.

== Founding members of the league ==
The ten founding members and their league positions in the 1932–33 season were:

- FC Wacker Halle, champion Saale division
- SV 08 Steinach, champion Südthüringen division
- VfL Bitterfeld, champion Mulde division
- SpVgg Erfurt
- SV Victoria 96 Magdeburg
- SC 95 Erfurt, champion Nordthüringen division
- 1. SV Jena 03, champion Ostthüringen division
- SV Merseburg 1899
- Fortuna Magdeburg, champion Elbe division
- SC Preußen Magdeburg

== Winners and runners-up of the Gauliga Mitte ==
The winners and runners-up of the league:

Season	Winner	Runner-Up
1933-34	FC Wacker Halle	SV 08 Steinach
1934-35	1. SV Jena 03	FC Wacker Halle
1935-36	1. SV Jena 03	Cricket Viktoria Magdeburg
1936-37	SV Dessau 05	FC Thüringen Weida
1937-38	SV Dessau 05	Cricket Viktoria Magdeburg
1938-39	SV Dessau 05	1. SV Jena 03
1939-40	1. SV Jena 03	SV Dessau 05
1940-41	1. SV Jena 03	SV Dessau 05
1941-42	SV Dessau 05	1. SV Jena 03
1942-43	SV Dessau 05	SpVgg Erfurt
1943-44	SV Dessau 05	SpVgg Erfurt

== Placings in the Gauliga Mitte 1933-44 ==
The complete list of all clubs participating in the league:

Club	1934	1935	1936	1937	1938	1939	1940	1941	1942	1943	1944
FC Wacker Halle	1	2	7	9					3	3	8
SV 08 Steinach	2	3	9			3					
VfL Bitterfeld	3	9									
SpVgg Erfurt	4	8	5	7	6	9				2	3
SV Victoria 96 Magdeburg	5	6	8	10							
SC 95 Erfurt	6	7	10		10				5	8	4
1. SV Jena	7	1	1	3	4	2	1	1	2	5	5
SV 99 Merseburg	8	10		8	3	7	7				
Fortuna Magdeburg	9					10					
Preußen Magdeburg	10										
Cricket Viktoria Magdeburg		4	2	5	2	5	5	4	10		
Sportfreunde Halle		5	3	4	9		8			4	7
1. FC Lauscha			4	6	8	8					
SV Dessau 05			6	1	1	1	2	2	1	1	1
FC Thüringen Weida				2	7	4	3	3	9		
VfL 96 Halle					5	6	6	6	4	7	9
1. SV Gera							4	7	8	9	
SpVgg Zeitz								5	6	10	
SC Apolda								8			
SV 98 Dessau									7	6	6
Reichsbahn/VfL Merseburg											2
Preußen Burg											10
