= Gauliga Wartheland =

- Founded: 1941
- Folded: 1945
- Replaced by: Region became part of Poland
- Country: Nazi Germany
- Gau: Wartheland
- Level on pyramid: Level 1
- Domestic cup(s): Tschammerpokal

The Gauliga Wartheland was the highest football league in Gau Wartheland from 1941 to 1945. The Gau was made up from the former Polish Voivodeship of Poznań and parts of Warsaw Voivodeship and Łódź Voivodeship which had been occupied by Nazi Germany in 1939 and incorporated into the Third Reich. The league and the region are named after the local river Warthe (Polish:Warta), and not after the Prussian province Posen, which it had been from 1848 to 1918.

== Overview ==
The league was introduced by the Nazi Sports Office in 1941, a considerable time after the defeat of Poland. The league started out in two groups of five teams, with the two divisional champions playing each other in a home-and-away series to determine the Gauliga champion. The league champion then qualified for the German championship. Polish clubs were not permitted to take part in the competition, only clubs from the German ethnic minority, which made up between five and ten percent of the population in the region and about two percent of the overall population of Poland.

In its second season, the league played with ten teams in a single division. The bottom three teams were relegated at the end of the season. The 1943-44 edition initially saw no change, but the SG Freihaus dropped out of the league during the season and not all games were played throughout the season.

The imminent collapse of Nazi Germany in 1945 affected play throughout the country with Gauliga competition in this region coming to a halt in 1944. There is no record that the 1944-45 season here ever commenced.

== Founding members of the league ==
The ten founding members were:

Group I:

- Deutscher SC Posen
- BSG DWM Posen
- SG Ordnungspolizei Posen
- Reichsbahn SG Posen
- Post SG Posen

Group II:

- SG Ordnungspolizei Litzmannstadt
- Union 97 Litzmannstadt
- SG Zduńska Wola (1943 SG Freihaus)
- Reichsbahn SG Litzmannstadt
- SG Sturm Pabianitz

Litzmannstadt was the German name for Łódź from 1939 to 1945, named after Karl Litzmann.

== Winners and runners-up of the league ==
The winners and runners-up of the league:

Season	Winner	Runner-Up
1941-42	SG Ordnungspolizei Litzmannstadt	Deutscher SC Posen
1942-43	BSG DWM Posen	SG Ordnungspolizei Posen
1943-44	BSG DWM Posen	SG Ordnungspolizei Posen

== Placings in the league 1941-44 ==
The complete list of clubs in the league:

Club	1942	1943	1944
DSC Posen	1	5	4
DMW Posen	2	1	1
Orpo Posen	3	2	2
Reichsbahn SG Posen	4		6
Post SG Posen	5	7	9
Orpo Litzmannstadt	1	4	7
Union 97 Litzmannstadt	2	3	8
SG Freihaus	3	8	10
Reichsbahn SG Litzmannstadt	4	10	
SG Sturm Pabianitz	5		
TSG Gnesen		6	5
TSG Kutno		9	
SG Kalisch			3

== Aftermath ==
With the end of the Nazi era, the Gauligas ceased to exist. The Wartheland came under Soviet control before again becoming part of Poland again. The German population was almost completely expelled from the region and all German football clubs were dissolved.
