= Gauliga Niederrhein =

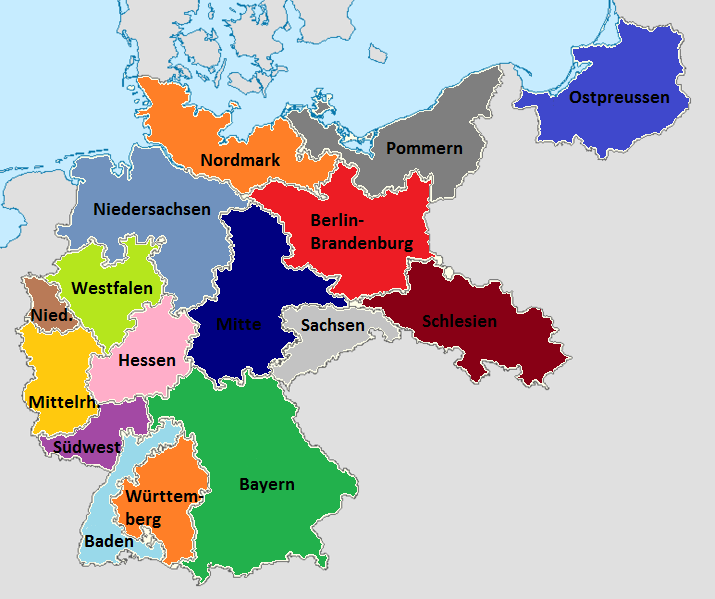
- Founded: 1933
- Folded: 1945 (12 seasons)
- Replaced by: Oberliga West
- Country: Nazi Germany
- Provinces: Rhine Province
- Gau (from 1934): Gau Essen; Gau Düsseldorf
- Level on pyramid: Level 1
- Domestic cup: Tschammerpokal
- Last champions: KSG SpV/48/99 Duisburg (1943-44)

The Gauliga Niederrhein was the highest football league in the northern part of the Prussian Rhine Province from 1933 to 1945. Shortly after the formation of the league, the Nazis reorganised the administrative regions in Germany, and the Gaue Essen and Düsseldorf replaced the Prussian province in the Lower Rhein (German: Niederrhein) region.

== Overview ==
The league was introduced by the Nazi Sports Office in 1933, after the Nazi takeover of power in Germany. It replaced the Bezirksligas and Oberligas as the highest level of play in German football competitions.

While the Gauliga Niederrhein covered a small area in size, the region had a substantial population. The most successful club from the region was Fortuna Düsseldorf, reaching the national championship final in 1936 and the cup final in 1937, both times coming out as the loser. No other club from the region reached a German final in this era.

In its first season, the league had twelve clubs, playing each other once at home and once away. The league champion then qualified for the German championship. The bottom three teams were relegated. The season after, the league was reduced to eleven, then ten teams. From 1935 to 1942, the modus and strength of the league did not alter, making it one of the few Gauligas which remained unaffected by the outbreak of World War II in 1939.

In the 1942–43 season, the league was reduced to nine clubs but returned to its old strength the season after.

The imminent collapse of Nazi Germany in 1945 gravely affected all Gauligas. The Gauliga Niederrhein retained its single-division, ten-team format even for its last season, too, but after only having played one round, the league was halted and did not resume again.

== Aftermath ==
With the end of the Nazi era, the Gauligas ceased to exist and the region found itself in the British occupation zone. Top-level football did not resume straight away, unlike in Southern Germany, and only in 1947 was a new, highest league introduced, the Oberliga West, which covered all of the new state of North Rhine-Westphalia.

== Founding members of the league ==
The twelve founding members and their league positions in the 1932–33 season were:

- VfL 06 Benrath
- Fortuna Düsseldorf, champion Bergisch-Mark division, German champion 1932-33
- SV Hamborn 07, champion Niederrhein division
- TSV Duisburg 99
- Borussia München-Gladbach
- Duisburger FV 08
- Schwarz-Weiß Essen
- Preußen Krefeld
- Rheydter SV
- BV Preußen Altenessen
- Alemannia Aachen
- Schwarz-Weiß Barmen

== Winners and runners-up of the Gauliga Niederrhein ==
The winners and runners-up of the league:

Season	Winner	Runner-Up
1933–34	VfL 06 Benrath	Fortuna Düsseldorf
1934–35	VfL 06 Benrath	Fortuna Düsseldorf
1935–36	Fortuna Düsseldorf	VfL 06 Benrath
1936–37	Fortuna Düsseldorf	TuS Duisburg 48/99
1937–38	Fortuna Düsseldorf	Schwarz-Weiß Essen
1938–39	Fortuna Düsseldorf	Schwarz-Weiß Essen
1939–40	Fortuna Düsseldorf	Schwarz-Weiß Essen
1940–41	TuS Helene Altenessen	Rot-Weiß Essen
1941–42	SV Hamborn 07	TuS Duisburg 48/99
1942–43	BSG Westende Hamborn	TuS Helene Altenessen
1943–44	KSG SpV/48/99 Duisburg	BSG Westende Hamborn

== Placings in the Gauliga Niederrhein 1933-44 ==
The complete list of all clubs participating in the league:

Club	1934	1935	1936	1937	1938	1939	1940	1941	1942	1943	1944
VfL 06 Benrath	1	1	2	8	7	9			8	7	5
Fortuna Düsseldorf	2	2	1	1	1	1	1	5	9		7
SF Hamborn 07 ^{3}	3	6	4	4	3	5	4	4	1	5	
TuS Duisburg 48/99 ^{3}	4	9		2	4	8	8	8	2	3	
Borussia Mönchengladbach	5	3	9								
FV 08 Duisburg	6	4	7	9							
Schwarz-Weiß Essen	7	7	8	6	2	2	2	3	6	9	
Preußen Krefeld	8	8	6	10							
Rheydter SpV	9	11									
BV Preußen Essen	10										
Alemannia Aachen ^{1}	11										
Schwarz-Weiß Barmen	12										
Rot-Weiß Oberhausen ^{3}		5	3	3	9		5	6	5	6	
Homberger SpV		10									
TuRu Düsseldorf			5	5	6	7	6	7	10		
Union Hamborn ^{3}			10		8	10					
SSV Wuppertal ^{2}				7	5	6	9		3	10	
BV Altenessen ^{3}					10						
Rot-Weiß Essen ^{3}						3	3	2	4	4	
BSG Westende Hamborn						4	7	9			2
VfB Hilden 03							10				
TuS Helene Altenessen								1	7	2	3
VfR Ohligs								10			
Union Krefeld										8	10
KSG SpV/48/99 Duisburg ^{3}											1
KSG Oberhausen ^{3}											4
Gelb-Weiß Hamborn											6
KSG Essen ^{3}											8
KSG Hamborn ^{3}											9

Source: "Gauliga Niederrhein". Das deutsche Fussball-Archiv.

- ^{1} Alemannia Aachen played in the Gauliga Mittelrhein from 1937.
- ^{2} SSV Ebersfeld became SSV Wuppertal in 1938.
- ^{3} The following “war sport unions” (German: KSG) were formed between clubs in September 1943:
  - TuS Duisburg 48/99 and Duisburger SV formed KSG SpV/48/99 Duisburg.
  - Hamborn 07 and Union Hamborn formed KSG Hamborn.
  - RW Essen and BV Altenessen formed KSG Essen.
  - RW Oberhausen and Elmar Oberhausen formed KSG Oberhausen.
