= Gauliga Nordmark =

Gauliga Nordmark Gauligas Hamburg Gauliga Mecklenburg Gauliga Schleswig-Holstein
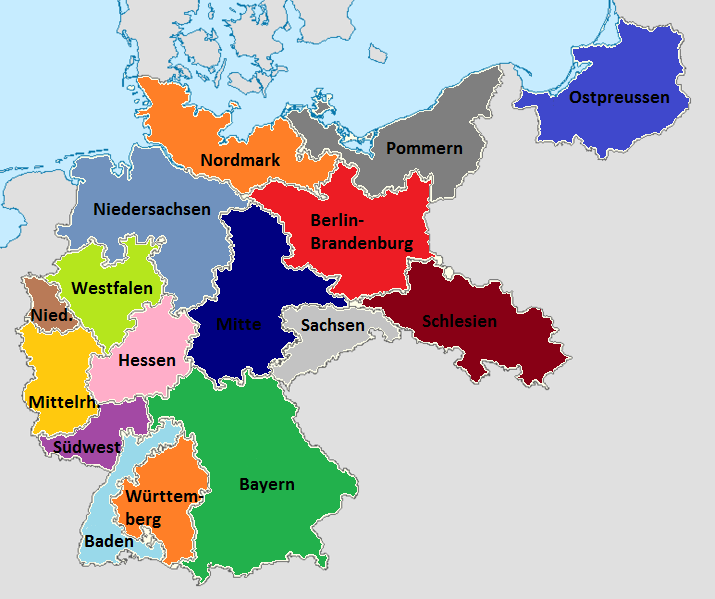
- Founded: 1933
- Folded: 1945
- Replaced by: Oberliga Nord; DDR-Oberliga
- Country: Nazi Germany
- Provinces and States: Province of Schleswig-Holstein; Free State of Oldenburg; Hamburg; Free City of Lübeck; Free State of Mecklenburg-Schwerin; Mecklenburg-Strelitz
- Gau (from 1934): Gau Hamburg; Gau Mecklenburg; Gau Schleswig-Holstein
- Level on pyramid: Level 1
- Domestic cup: Tschammerpokal
- Last champions: Gauliga Hamburg: Hamburger SV (1944-45); Gauliga Mecklenburg: Luftwaffen SV Rerik (1943-44); Gauliga Schleswig-Holstein: Holstein Kiel (1943-44)

The Gauliga Nordmark was the highest football league in the Prussian Province of Schleswig-Holstein and the German states of Hamburg, Lübeck, Mecklenburg-Schwerin, Mecklenburg-Strelitz and parts of Oldenburg from 1933 to 1945. Shortly after the formation of the league, the Nazis reorganised the administrative regions in Germany, and the Gaue Hamburg, Mecklenburg and Schleswig-Holstein replaced the Prussian province and the German states in this northern region of Germany.

From 1942, the Gauliga Nordmark was split into three separate leagues, the Gauliga Hamburg, Gauliga Mecklenburg and the Gauliga Schleswig-Holstein.

The German word Nordmark can be translated as Northern Marches, referring to the fact that the league covered the northernmost part of the country.

== Overview ==
=== Gauliga Nordmark ===
The league was introduced by the Nazi Sports Office in 1933, after the Nazi takeover of power in Germany. It replaced the Oberliga Lübeck/Mecklenburg, Oberliga Schleswig-Holstein, Oberliga Nordhannover and Oberliga Hamburg as the highest level of play of the regional football competitions.

In its first season, the league had ten clubs, playing each other once at home and once away. The league champion then qualified for the German championship. The bottom two teams were relegated, however, due to Viktoria Wilhelmsburg moving to the Gauliga Niedersachsen, only one club went down in 1934.

The league retained its modus until 1937, when two clubs, the Borussia Harburg and FV Wilhelmsburg 09 transferred across from the Gauliga Niedersachsen. The league was therefore upsized to twelve clubs with three relegated teams for the 1937-38 season. It was reduced to eleven clubs for the season after.

Due to the outbreak of World War II in 1939, the league was split into two regional groups, one of six and one of seven clubs. The two group champions then played a home-and-away final for the Gauliga championship. The league returned to a twelve-team, single-division format for the 1940-41 season and downsized to ten club for its last season, 1941-42.

Unlike all other territories Germany had lost after the First World War, the Danish-speaking parts of northern Schleswig which had been awarded to Denmark in 1920 were not reoccupied by Germany after 1940. No clubs from Denmark took part in the league therefore.

=== Gauliga Hamburg ===
The league started with ten clubs in a single division in 1942, containing only clubs from the greater Hamburg area. It remained at this strength for the duration of its existence.

Unlike all other leagues in the country, the Gauliga Hamburg managed to complete its program in its last season, 1944–45 before the collapse of Nazi Germany finished all competition. This was mainly due to the league being city-based and therefore much less affected by the restrictions on transport in the final war year.

Of the clubs from the region Nordmark, only the Luftwaffen-SV Hamburg achieved any form of national success during the Gauliga years. The club of the German air force (Luftwaffe) reached the cup final in 1943 and the championship final in 1944, losing both times.

=== Gauliga Mecklenburg ===
The territory of the new Gauliga Mecklenburg was made up of the area of the Gau of the same name.

The league started out with seven clubs in a single division and expanded to ten clubs for the 1943-44 season. Its last season, 1944–45, probably did not get underway at all due to the effects of the war in the region.

=== Gauliga Schleswig-Holstein ===
The league started out with ten clubs in a single division, all from the Gau Schleswig-Holstein. It remained at this strength in its second season, 1943-44. The third edition, 1944–45 got barely underway when the effects of the war forced it to be cancelled. Play continued on local level in Kiel and Lübeck, but no Gauliga champion was determined.

=== Aftermath ===
With the end of the Nazi era, the Gauligas ceased to exist and the northern part of Germany found itself in the British occupation zone. Mecklenburg however, was part of the Soviet zone and became later part of East Germany.

In the British zone, top-level football did not resume straight away, unlike in Southern Germany, and only in 1947 was a new, highest league introduced, the Oberliga Nord, which covered the new states of Lower Saxony and Schleswig-Holstein along with the recreated city-states of Hamburg and Bremen.

Mecklenburg became part of the East German football league system and the DDR-Oberliga was introduced as the new highest league in 1949.

== Founding members of the league ==
The ten founding members and their league positions in the Oberliga in 1932-33 were:

- Eimsbütteler TV
- Hamburger SV
- Holstein Kiel, champion Oberliga Schleswig-Holstein
- Viktoria Wilhelmsburg, champion Oberliga Nordhannover
- FC Altona 93, champion Oberliga Hamburg
- Union 03 Altona
- Polizei Hamburg
- Borussia Kiel
- Polizei SV Lübeck
- SV Schwerin 03, champion Oberliga Lübeck/Mecklenburg

== Winners and runners-up of the league ==
The winners and runners-up of the league:

=== Gauliga Nordmark ===
Season	Winner	Runner-Up
1933-34	Eimsbütteler TV	Hamburger SV
1934-35	Eimsbütteler TV	Hamburger SV
1935-36	Eimsbütteler TV	SC Victoria Hamburg
1936-37	Hamburger SV	Holstein Kiel
1937-38	Hamburger SV	Eimsbütteler TV
1938-39	Hamburger SV	Eimsbütteler TV
1939-40	Eimsbütteler TV	Hamburger SV
1940-41	Hamburger SV	Eimsbütteler TV
1941-42	Eimsbütteler TV	Hamburger SV

=== Gauliga Hamburg ===
Season	Winner	Runner-Up
1942-43	Victoria Hamburg	Hamburger SV
1943-44	Luftwaffen-SV Hamburg	Hamburger SV
1944-45	Hamburger SV	FC Altona 93

=== Gauliga Mecklenburg ===
Season	Winner	Runner-Up
1942-43	TSG Rostock	Luftwaffen SV Rechlin
1943-44	Luftwaffen SV Rerik	Luftwaffen SV Rechlin

=== Gauliga Schleswig-Holstein ===
Season	Winner	Runner-Up
1942-43	Holstein Kiel	SG Ordnungspolizei Lübeck
1943-44	Holstein Kiel	FC Kilia Kiel

== Placings in the league 1933-44 ==
The complete list of all clubs participating in the league:

=== Gauliga Nordmark ===
Club	1934	1935	1936	1937	1938	1939	1940	1941	1942
Eimsbütteler TV	1	1	1	5	2	2	1	2	1
Hamburger SV	2	2	3	1	1	1	1	1	2
Holstein Kiel	3	3	4	2	4	3	3	5	3
Viktoria Wilhelmsburg ^{1}	4								
FC Altona 93	5	7	6	8	9	8	2	6	7
Union Altona	6	5	9						
Borussia Kiel	7	9							
MSV Hansa Hamburg ^{3}	8	8	10						
Polizei SV Lübeck	9	6	5	6	3	7	3	3	4
SV Schwerin 03	10					11			
SC Victoria Hamburg		4	2	3	5	4	2	4	6
FC St. Pauli		10		4	6	5	6		
Phönix Lübeck			7	6	10				
SC Sperber Hamburg			8	10			5	10	
FK Rothenburgsort				9					
Komet Hamburg					7	6	6		
Borussia Harburg ^{2}					8	10	4	11	
Polizei SV Hamburg					11				
FV Wilhelmsburg 09 ^{2}					12			8	9
Rasensport Harburg						9			
Concordia Hamburg							5	12	
SG Barmek							4	7	10
Fortuna Glückstadt								9	
WSV Schwerin									5
FC Kilia Kiel									8

- ^{1} Moved from the Gauliga Nordmark to the Gauliga Niedersachsen in 1934.
- ^{2} Moved from the Gauliga Niedersachsen to the Gauliga Nordmark in 1937.
- ^{3} Polizei Hamburg changed its name to MSV Hansa Hamburg in 1935.

=== Gauliga Schleswig-Holstein ===
Club	1943	1944
Holstein Kiel	1	1
Polizei SV Lübeck	2	6
SC Friedrichsort	3	2
FC Kilia Kiel	4	3
SV Ellerbek	5	4
Fortuna Glückstadt	6	9
Comet Kiel	7	10
Borussia Kiel	8	8
Phönix Lübeck	9	
Reichsbahn Neumünster	10	
VfB Kiel		5
TSG Gaarden		7

=== Gauliga Hamburg ===
Club	1943	1944
SC Victoria Hamburg	1	3
Hamburger SV	2	2
FC Altona 93	3	4
FC St. Pauli	4	7
FV Wilhelmsburg 09	5	8
Eimsbütteler TV	6	5
Polizei SV Hamburg	7	
SC Sperber Hamburg	8	9
Viktoria Wilhelmsburg	9	
SG Barmbek	10	
LSV Hamburg		1
Komet Hamburg		6
HEBC/Sport		10

=== Gauliga Mecklenburg ===
Club	1943	1944
TSG Rostock	1	7
LSV Rechlin	2	2
LSV Rerik	3	1
LSV Neubrandenburg	4	5
LSV Warnemünde	5	6
TSK Rostock	6	10
TSV Wismar	7	
SV Schwerin 03	8	4
VfL Güstrow	9	
Neukaliss	10	
WSV Ludwigslust		3
KSG Wismar-Tarnewitz		8
WKG Heinkel Rostock		9
