= SV Dessau 05 =

German football club

- Full name: Sportverein Dessau 1905 e.V.
- Nickname(s): Die Nullfuenfer (The 05's)
- Founded: 1905
- Ground: Schillerpark
- Capacity: 5,000
- Manager: Dimitrios Mitsis
- League: Verbandsliga Sachsen-Anhalt (VI)
- 2015–16: 8th
Home colours	Away colours

SV Dessau 05 is a German association football club based in Dessau, Saxony-Anhalt. They distinguished themselves in 1949 as winners of the inaugural FDGB-Pokal, the East German Cup.

== History ==
The club was founded in July 1905 as FC Adler and in October of that year merged with the football department of the church youth group Jugendvereins zu St. Johannis to become Dessauer FC. After World War I, in February 1919, this club joined Sportlichen Vereinigung BAMAG Dessau to form VfR Dessau 1905, and two years later a union with SpVgg Dessau created SV Dessau 05.

In 1935, after the re-organization of German football under the Third Reich, Dessau played in the Gauliga Mitte, one of sixteen new upper class divisions. The club quickly emerged as a strong side, capturing three division titles from 1937 to 1939, finishing second the next two seasons, and then winning another three consecutive titles from 1942 to 1944. However, Dessau was never able to achieve any kind of success in the subsequent playoff rounds of the national championships, making it past the preliminary rounds only once in six attempts. In 1942, the team advanced as far as the quarterfinals of the Tschammerpokal, predecessor of today's German Cup.

After World War II, most organizations in Germany, including sports associations and football clubs, were dissolved by the occupying Allied authorities. The club was re-formed in late 1945 as Blau-Weiss Dessau. As was typical in Soviet occupied East Germany, the club would undergo a number of name changes: Sport-Union Dessau (1947); SG Dessau-Nord (1948); BSG Waggonbau Dessau (1949); BSG Waggonfabrik Dessau (August 1949); and BSG Motor Dessau (February 1950). It was as Waggonbau Dessau that the club defeated BSG Gera-Süd 1–0 to capture the East German Cup, the most significant honour in their history.

From 1949 to 1954, Dessau played in the top-flight DDR-Oberliga where their best result was a third-place finish in their first year of play at that level. After falling from the top division the club played for the most part as a second division side until 1967 when they slipped further to Bezirksliga Halle (III) where they played until the start of the 1980s. In 1989, they abandoned the name Motor Dessau to play as SV Waggonbau Dessau, and in 1995 re-claimed the name SV Dessau 05.

In the early 2000s, Dessau played most of their football in the fifth tier Verbandsliga Sachsen-Anhalt, interrupted by two one-season stints in the NOFV-Oberliga Süd in 2004–05 and 2006–07. In 2009, it dropped down to the Landesliga but won promotion back up to the Verbandsliga in 2014 where it plays today.

== Honours ==
The club's honours:

- Gauliga Mitte
  - Champions: 1937, 1938, 1939, 1942, 1943, 1944
  - Runners-up: 1940, 1941
- FDGB-Pokal
  - Winners: 1949
- Verbandsliga Sachsen-Anhalt (V)
  - Champions: 2004, 2006
- Landesliga Sachsen-Anhalt Süd
  - Champions: 2014
  - Runners-up: 2012
