= Luftwaffen-SV Hamburg =

German football club

Luftwaffen-Sportverein Hamburg
- Full name: Luftwaffen-Sportverein Hamburg
- Founded: 1942; 84 years ago
- Ground: Hoheluft
- League: Gauliga Hamburg
- –: defunct since 1945; 81 years ago
Home colours	Away colours

Luftwaffen-SV Hamburg (literally: Airforce sports club Hamburg) was a short-lived military German association football club active during World War II and is notable as the most successful of the wartime military sides.

== History ==
=== Military sports clubs ===
Through the course of the war military sports teams were formed both in Germany and in occupied territories to serve as morale boosters for both service men and civilian populations. In addition to LSV Hamburg this included sides such as Luftwaffen-SV Danzig, SV der SG SS Straßburg, Mölders Krakau, and Heeres-SV Groß Born. Some military commanders sought out skilled or well-known footballers to play for their clubs. For the players this often provided a means to avoid other more dangerous service in the armed forces. Among the more well-known teams at the time was the Rote Jäger assembled by Hermann Graf, commander of German fighter pilots, whose team included famed national team player Fritz Walter and national team manager Sepp Herberger.

LSV Hamburg was formed 8 December 1942 at the direction of Colonel Laicher, commander of the anti-aircraft artillery defending Hamburg. The club was managed by Otto Faist who had led Schalke 04 to the German national championship in 1939 in a crushing 9–0 victory over Admira Wien in the final.

=== Quick success ===
LSV joined the Gauliga Hamburg in 1943. The division had been formed the previous year out of the split of the Gauliga Nordmark, one of sixteen top-flight divisions formed in the 1933 re-organization of German football under the Third Reich. The club played most of its home matches at Hoheluft which was the home field of Victoria Hamburg.

The team played its way to the final of the 1943 Tschammerpokal, predecessor of today's German Cup, where they lost 2–3 to Vienna FC. LSV Hamburg then totally dominated the Gauliga Hamburg in 1943–44, winning 17 matches while drawing only one, and outscoring their opponents 117–13. They advanced through the national playoff rounds to the championship match on 18 June 1944 in Berlin where they lost 0–4 to defending champions Dresdner SC, a club they had earlier eliminated from German Cup competition on their march to the cup final.

In a desperate bid to help keep up civilian morale as the tide of war turned against the country, league play was immediately resumed within weeks of the championship match rather than after the customary three-month summer break. Hamburg completed only three games before play by all military clubs was suspended in September 1944 as Allied armies began to advance on Germany.

== Team trivia ==
- Between 1903 and 1944 German national champions were awarded the Viktoria Cup. The 1944 final between Dresdner SC and LSV Hamburg was the last Viktoria Cup match ever played as the trophy disappeared at war's end and was replaced by the Meisterschale, first awarded in 1949, and still in use today to recognize the country's Bundesliga champions. The missing trophy has since been recovered and is held by the German Football Association (Deutscher Fußball Bund).
- Due to difficult wartime conditions in Germany the 1943–44 playoff rounds were initially cancelled and the title awarded to VfR Mannheim. However, widespread protest led to this decision being reversed and the resumption of the playoffs. Mannheim was eliminated in the last 16 by 1. FC Nürnberg who were in turn put out by eventual champions Dresdner SC in the semi-finals.
