= 1935 Tschammerpokal final =

- Event: 1935 Tschammerpokal
1. FC Nürnberg	Schalke 04
2	0
- Date: 8 December 1935
- Venue: Rheinstadion, Düsseldorf
- Referee: Alfred Birlem (Berlin)
- Attendance: 60,000

The 1935 Tschammerpokal final decided the winner of the 1935 Tschammerpokal, the first season of Germany's knockout football cup competition. It was played on 8 December 1935 at the Rheinstadion in Düsseldorf. 1. FC Nürnberg won the match 2–0 against Schalke 04 to claim the first national cup title.

== Route to the final ==
The Tschammerpokal began the final stage with 63 teams in a single-elimination knockout cup competition. There were a total of five rounds leading up to the final. Teams were drawn against each other, and the winner after 90 minutes would advance. If still tied, 30 minutes of extra time was played. If the score was still level, a replay would take place at the original away team's stadium. If still level after 90 minutes, 30 minutes of extra time was played. If the score was still level, a second replay would take place at the original home team's stadium. If still level after 90 minutes, 30 minutes of extra time was played. If the score was still level, a drawing of lots would decide who would advance to the next round.

Note: In all results below, the score of the finalist is given first (H: home; A: away; N: neutral).

1. FC Nürnberg		Round	Schalke 04
Opponent	Result	1935 Tschammerpokal	Opponent	Result
VfB Leipzig (A)	3–1	Round 1	SpVgg Göttingen (A)	2–1
Ulmer FV (H)	8–0	Round 2	Spielverein Kassel 06 (H)	8–0
PSV Chemnitz (A)	3–1	Round of 16	Hannover 96 (A)	6–2
SC Minerva 93 Berlin (H)	4–1	Quarter-finals	VfL Benrath (A)	4–1
Waldhof Mannheim (H)	1–0	Semi-finals	Freiburger FC (N)	6–2

== Match ==
=== Details ===
8 December 1935

1. FC Nürnberg	2–0	Schalke 04
Eiberger 46'; Friedel 84'	Report

Rheinstadion, Düsseldorf
Attendance: 60,000
Referee: Alfred Birlem (Berlin)

1. FC Nürnberg	Schalke 04

GK	1	(Germany) Georg Köhl
RB		(Germany) Willi Billmann
LB		(Germany) Andreas Munkert
RH		(Germany) Hans Übelein
CH		(Germany) Heinz Carolin
LH		(Germany) Richard Oehm
OR		(Germany) Karl Gußner
IR		(Germany) Max Eiberger
CF		(Germany) Georg Friedel
IL		(Germany) Josef Schmitt (c)
OL		(Germany) Willi Spieß
Manager:
(Germany) Richard Michalke

GK	1	(Germany) Hermann Mellage
RB		(Germany) Hans Bornemann
LB		(Germany) Otto Schweisfurth
RH		(Germany) Otto Tibulski
CH		(Germany) Hermann Nattkämper
LH		(Germany) Rudolf Gellesch
OR		(Germany) Ernst Kalwitzki
IR		(Germany) Fritz Szepan
CF		(Germany) Ernst Poertgen
IL		(Germany) Ernst Kuzorra (c)
OL		(Germany) Adolf Urban
Manager:
(Germany) Hans Schmidt

Match rules

- 90 minutes.
- 30 minutes of extra time if necessary.
- Replay if scores still level.
- No substitutions.
