= 1934–35 Gauliga =

Gauliga
- Season: 1934–35
- Champions: 16 regional winners
- German champions: Schalke 04; 2nd German title

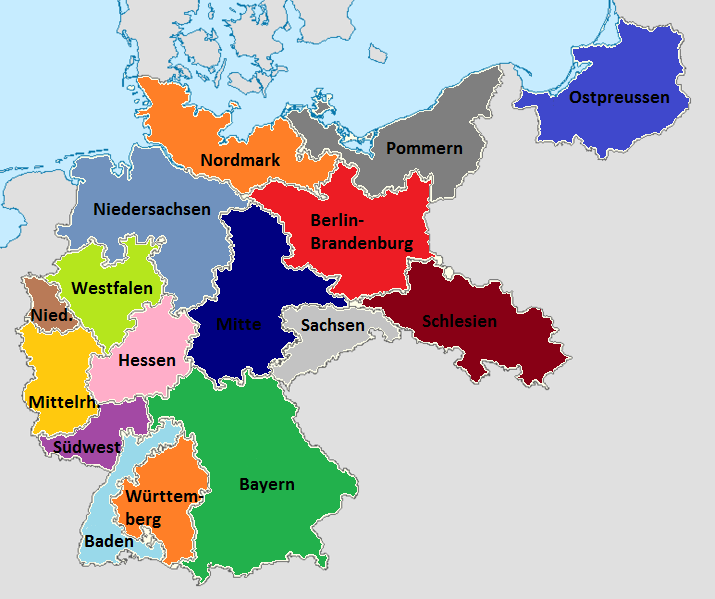
The initial 16 districts of the Gauliga in 1933

The 1934–35 Gauliga was the second season of the Gauliga, the first tier of the football league system in Germany from 1933 to 1945.

The league operated in sixteen regional divisions, of which two, the Gauliga Ostpreußen and Gauliga Pommern, were sub-divided into two regional groups again, with the league containing 172 clubs all up, six less than the previous season. The league champions entered the 1935 German football championship, won by FC Schalke 04 who defeated VfB Stuttgart 6–4 in the final. It was Schalke's second national championship and the club would go on to win six all up during the Gauliga era of German football from 1933 to 1945.

No club remained unbeaten during the league season but five teams finished with just one defeat, those being Yorck Boyen Insterburg, Stettiner SC, Eimsbütteler TV, SV Werder Bremen and FC Hanau 93. At the other end of the table two clubs finished the season without a win, Viktoria Recklinghausen and Germania Karlsdorf. Hannover 96 scored the most goals of any Gauliga club with 80 while Bremer SV conceded the most with 84. VfL 06 Benrath and Eimsbütteler TV achieved the highest points totals with 32 each while Viktoria Recklinghausen, Komet Stettin and FC Mannheim-Lindenhof earned the least with four points each to their name.

The 1934–35 season saw the introduction of a cup competition, the Tschammerpokal, now the DFB-Pokal. The inaugural 1935 edition was won by 1. FC Nürnberg, defeating German champion FC Schalke 04 2–0 on 8 December 1935, preventing Schalke from winning the double, something the club would achieve two years later in 1937 as the only club in the pre-Bundesliga era.

== Champions ==
The 1934–35 Gauliga champions qualified for the group stage of the German championship. VfL 06 Benrath, PSV Chemnitz, VfB Stuttgart and FC Schalke 04 won their championship groups and advanced to the semi-finals with the latter two reaching the championship final which Schalke won.

FC Schalke 04, VfL 06 Benrath and Eimsbütteler TV won back-to-back Gauliga titles while the other 13 champions all won their first.

Club	League	No. of clubs
VfR Mannheim	Gauliga Baden	10
SpVgg Fürth	Gauliga Bayern (1934–35 season)	11
Hertha BSC	Gauliga Berlin-Brandenburg	11
FC Hanau 93	Gauliga Hessen	10
SV Jena	Gauliga Mitte	10
VfR Köln	Gauliga Mittelrhein	10
VfL 06 Benrath	Gauliga Niederrhein	11
Hannover 96	Gauliga Niedersachsen	10
Eimsbütteler TV	Gauliga Nordmark	10
Yorck Boyen Insterburg	Gauliga Ostpreußen	14
SC Stettin	Gauliga Pommern	14
PSV Chemnitz	Gauliga Sachsen	10
Vorwärts-Rasensport Gleiwitz	Gauliga Schlesien	10
Phönix Ludwigshafen	Gauliga Südwest	11
FC Schalke 04	Gauliga Westfalen	10
VfB Stuttgart	Gauliga Württemberg	10
