= Ernst Kuzorra =

German footballer (1905–1990)

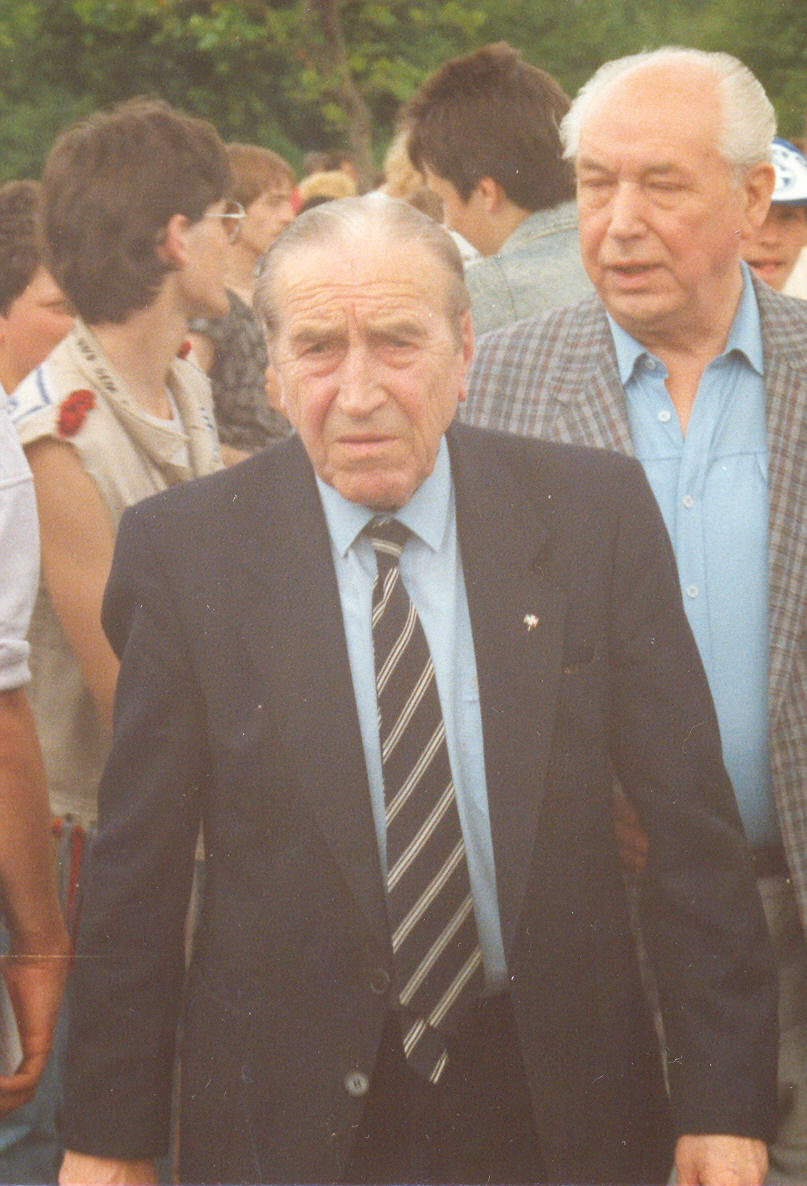
- Kuzorra in 1987

Personal information
- Date of birth: 16 October 1905
- Place of birth: Gelsenkirchen, German Empire
- Date of death: 1 January 1990 (aged 84)
- Place of death: Gelsenkirchen, West Germany
- Position: Forward

Youth career
- 1920–1923: Schalke 04

Senior career*
Years	Team	Apps	(Gls)
1923–1950	Schalke 04	398	(375)

International career
1927–1938	Germany	12	(7)

Managerial career
- 1935–1936: Borussia Dortmund
- 1946–1947: Schalke 04
- * Club domestic league appearances and goals

Ernst Kuzorra (16 October 1905 – 1 January 1990) was a German footballer of the pre-war era. During his entire career, he played for Schalke 04, whom he led to six national championships and one national cup. He is commonly regarded as the greatest Schalke player of all time alongside Fritz Szepan. A highly athletic, technical and prolific forward, Kuzorra is also commonly regarded as one of the greatest German forwards.

== Life ==
Ernst Kuzorra was born as the son of Karl Kuzorra from East Prussia and his wife Bertha in the industrial town of Gelsenkirchen where his father worked as a coal miner. Ernst joined the club in 1920 at the age of 14, allegedly playing his first match in his confirmation shoes after being asked to join the team while watching from the sidelines. Three years later, he advanced to the first team, where he soon became one of the starting players. He was part of Germany's team at the 1928 Summer Olympics, but he did not play in any matches. During the years 1930–31, he and thirteen teammates were banned for a relatively minor infraction of the strict amateur statutes, having received ten instead of the allowed five Reichsmark as compensation for playing in an away game.

In the following years, Kuzorra along with his brother-in-law Fritz Szepan led Schalke to become the dominant team in German soccer, winning six national championships from 1934 to 1942. He was one of the main axes of what became known as the Schalker Kreisel, a system that used quick, short passes to confuse and overwhelm the opponent.

Even though he may have been the best German player on his position at the time, he only had 12 appearances for the national team, a fact that is widely attributed to bad relations with national coach Otto Nerz. Nevertheless, because of his success and his athletic prowess, national socialist propaganda soon took an interest in him. Great efforts were made to show that Kuzorra, despite his Slavic sounding name and mixed origin, was in fact of purely Germanic stock. The success of these efforts was limited, however, as Kuzorra remained politically uninterested and due to his taciturn character a poor instrument for public campaigns.

After the war, Kuzorra remained playing for a few years, mainly for material reasons - at the time, soccer players were often reimbursed in otherwise scarce foodstuff. In 1950 he retired, and from then on earned his livelihood as proprietor of a tobacco and lottery store. Over time, he became a living legend, especially among the supporters of Schalke 04. In 1985, he finally received the honorary citizenship of his home town, Gelsenkirchen. Ernst Kuzorra died on New Year's Day in 1990 at the age of 84. Including official games, friendlies and youth games, he reportedly scored over 1000 goals for Schalke.

== Career statistics ==
=== Club ===
Appearances and goals by club, season and competition
Club	Season	League			German Champ'ship		Cup (Note: Tschammer-Pokal (forerunner of today's DFB-Pokal))		Other (Note: Includes Ruhr / Western German championship (1926–1933), Westphalian Cup (1943–1944), Westphalian / British zone championship (1947))		Total	
Club	Season	Division	Apps	Goals	Apps	Goals	Apps	Goals	Apps	Goals	Apps	Goals
Schalke 04	1924–26	Emscher-Kreisliga	9	16	—		—		—		9	16
Schalke 04	1926–27	Gauliga Ruhr	14	21	1	0	—		8	11	23	32
Schalke 04	1927–28	Gauliga Ruhr	10	16	1	0	—		9	11	20	27
Schalke 04	1928–29	Gauliga Ruhr	7	11	2	1	—		9	8	18	20
Schalke 04	1929–30	Gauliga Ruhr	16	34	2	1	—		6	5	24	40
Schalke 04	1930–31	Gauliga Ruhr	0	0	—		—		—		0	0
Schalke 04	1931–32	Gauliga Ruhr	11	18	3	2	—		5	9	19	29
Schalke 04	1932–33	Gauliga Ruhr	15	19	4	2	—		5	4	24	25
Schalke 04	1933–34	Gauliga Westfalen	16	18	4	3	—		—		20	21
Schalke 04	1934–35	Gauliga Westfalen	16	5	6	6	—		—		22	11
Schalke 04	1935–36	Gauliga Westfalen	15	18	8	8	6	9	—		29	35
Schalke 04	1936–37	Gauliga Westfalen	14	15	7	5	7	4	—		28	24
Schalke 04	1937–38	Gauliga Westfalen	17	21	9	5	6	0	—		32	26
Schalke 04	1938–39	Gauliga Westfalen	16	9	7	4	1	2	—		24	15
Schalke 04	1939–40	Gauliga Westfalen	11	8	7	7	2	2	—		20	17
Schalke 04	1940–41	Gauliga Westfalen	16	13	8	2	3	0	—		27	15
Schalke 04	1941–42	Gauliga Westfalen	12	12	5	2	6	4	—		23	18
Schalke 04	1942–43	Gauliga Westfalen	15	12	3	0	4	3	4	4	26	19
Schalke 04	1943–44	Gauliga Westfalen	12	11	2	0	4	2	4	4	22	17
Schalke 04	1944–45	Gauliga Westfalen	4	5	—		—		—		4	5
Schalke 04	1945–46	Landesliga Westfalen	6	2	—		—		—		6	2
Schalke 04	1946–47	Landesliga Westfalen	7	4	—		—		5	0	12	4
Schalke 04	1947–48	Oberliga West	14	1	—		—		—		14	1
Schalke 04	1948–49	Oberliga West	4	0	—		—		—		4	0
Career total			277	289	79	48	39	26	55	56	450	419

=== International ===
Appearances and goals by national team and year
National team	Year	Apps	Goals
Germany	1927	1	0
Germany	1928	2	1
Germany	1929	0	0
Germany	1930	2	3
Germany	1931	2	1
Germany	1932	3	0
Germany	1933	0	0
Germany	1934	0	0
Germany	1935	0	0
Germany	1936	1	2
Germany	1937	0	0
Germany	1938	1	0
Total		12	7

== Honours ==
Schalke 04

- German Championship: 1934, 1935, 1937, 1939, 1940, 1942
- German Cup: 1937
