= 1935 Tschammerpokal =

Tournament details
- Country: Germany
- Teams: 63

Final positions
- Champions: 1. FC Nürnberg (1st title)
- Runners-up: Schalke 04

Tournament statistics
- Matches played: 67

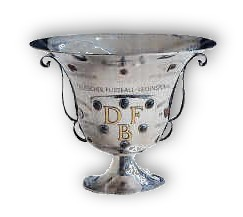
The Tschammerpokal on a flag at the easyCredit Stadium commemorating FCN's cup victory in 1935.

The 1935 Tschammerpokal was the 1st season of the annual German football cup competition. This was the first time a national cup tournament was held in Germany. Its name was chosen in honour of Reichssportführer Hans von Tschammer und Osten, then the highest ranking sports official in Nazi Germany. The tournament began on 6 January 1935 and ended on 8 December 1935. About 4,100 teams competed in the qualifying tournament which was divided into four stages. 63 teams competed in the final stage of six rounds. In the final 1. FC Nürnberg defeated Schalke 04 2–0.

== Matches ==
=== First round ===
Yorck Boyen Insterburg were also in this round, but may have withdrawn before the draw.

18 August 1935
Eintracht Bad Kreuznach	1 – 6	SV Waldhof Mannheim
Sportvereinigung Masovia Lyck	7 – 3	Tilsiter SC
Stettiner SC	0 – 1	SC Minerva 93 Berlin
Vorwärts-Rasensport Gleiwitz	9 – 1	Breslauer FV 06
SC Vorwärts Breslau	3 – 1	BC Hartha
Dresdner Sportfreunde	6 – 1	SV Klettendorf
SpVgg Göttingen	1 – 5	FC Schalke 04
Union Recklinghausen	0 – 5	VfL Benrath
Sportring Gevelsberg	2 – 5	VfR Köln
SV Hamborn 07	1 – 2	SpVgg Herten
Fortuna Düsseldorf	5 – 0	Kölner SC 1899
Kölner CfR	3 – 4	Hannover 96	(AET)
FC Hanau 93	5 – 1	SC Eintracht Windecken
Spielverein Kassel 06	2 – 1	Phönix Ludwigshafen
BC Elsterberg	4 – 4	1. SV Jena	(AET)
VfB Leipzig	1 – 2	1. FC Nürnberg
VfL Bitterfeld	1 – 2	Hertha BSC	(AET)
SV Merseburg	2 – 4	PSV Chemnitz
Kieler SV Holstein	7 – 1	SpVgg Nordring Stettin
SC Victoria Hamburg	1 – 2	Berolina-LSC Berlin
Eimsbütteler TV	7 – 0	Hamburg-Eimsbütteler BC
Eintracht Braunschweig	6 – 3	Reichsbahn SV Berlin
SV Werder Bremen	4 – 5	Hamburger SV
Fuldaer SV Germania	1 – 5	SpVgg Fürth
VfR Wormatia Worms	3 – 0	FC Egelsbach
VfR Mannheim	5 – 3	FV Homburg
FV Bretten	1 – 3	Freiburger FC
Karlsruher FV	0 – 1	SV Feuerbach
VfB Stuttgart	3 – 4	BC Augsburg	(AET)
1. FC Schweinfurt 05	4 – 0	SV Steinach
Ulmer FV 1894	5 – 4	FC Bayern Munich	(AET)
VfB Königsberg		bye

==== Replay ====
8 September 1935
1. SV Jena	4 – 2	BC Elsterberg

=== Second round ===
22 September 1935
VfB Königsberg	0 – 1	Sportvereinigung Masovia Lyck
Berolina-LSC Berlin	3 – 2	Vorwärts-Rasensport Gleiwitz
SC Vorwärts Breslau	2 – 4	SC Minerva 93 Berlin
Dresdner Sportfreunde	1 – 0	Hertha BSC
PSV Chemnitz	4 – 2	1. FC Schweinfurt 05
Hamburger SV	1 – 4	Fortuna Düsseldorf
Eintracht Braunschweig	7 – 0	1. SV Jena
Hannover 96	4 – 3	Kieler SV Holstein
FC Schalke 04	8 – 0	Spielverein Kassel 06
SpVgg Herten	1 – 4	FC Hanau 93
VfL Benrath	5 – 3	Eimsbütteler TV
VfR Köln	0 – 2	SpVgg Fürth
SV Waldhof Mannheim	5 – 1	VfR Wormatia Worms
Freiburger FC	3 – 0	SV Feuerbacgh
BC Augsburg	2 – 3	VfR Mannheim
1. FC Nürnberg	8 – 0	Ulmer FV 1894

=== Round of 16 ===
27 October 1935
SC Minerva 93 Berlin	4 – 2	Eintracht Braunschweig
Dresdner Sportfreunde	2 – 1	Sportvereinigung Masovia Lyck
PSV Chemnitz	1 – 3	1. FC Nürnberg
Hannover 96	2 – 6	FC Schalke 04
Fortuna Düsseldorf	0 – 3	SV Waldhof Mannheim
FC Hanau 93	5 – 1	Berolina-LSC Berlin
SpVgg Fürth	2 – 3	Freiburger FC
VfR Mannheim	2 – 3	VfL Benrath

=== Quarter-finals ===
10 November 1935
VfL Benrath	1 – 4	FC Schalke 04
SV Waldhof Mannheim	1 – 0	Dresdner Sportfreunde
Freiburger FC	2 – 1	FC Hanau 93
1. FC Nürnberg	4 – 1	SC Minerva 93 Berlin

=== Semi-finals ===
24 November 1935

FC Schalke 04	6 – 2	Freiburger FC
Szepan 20' (pen.), 80'; Kuzorra 35', 43', 85' (pen.); Poertgen 65'		Peters 8' (pen.); Koßmann 84'

Rote Erde, Dortmund
Attendance: 32,000
Referee: Broden (Duisburg)

24 November 1935

SV Waldhof Mannheim	0 – 1	1. FC Nürnberg
		Spieß 52'

Städtisches Stadion, Nuremberg
Attendance: 15,000
Referee: Dörbecker (Stuttgart)

=== Final ===
8 December 1935

1. FC Nürnberg	2–0	Schalke 04
Eiberger 46'; Friedel 84'	Report

Rheinstadion, Düsseldorf
Attendance: 60,000
Referee: Alfred Birlem (Berlin)
