= 1938–39 Gauliga =

Gauliga
- Season: 1938–39
- Champions: 18 regional winners
- German champions: Schalke 04; 4th German title

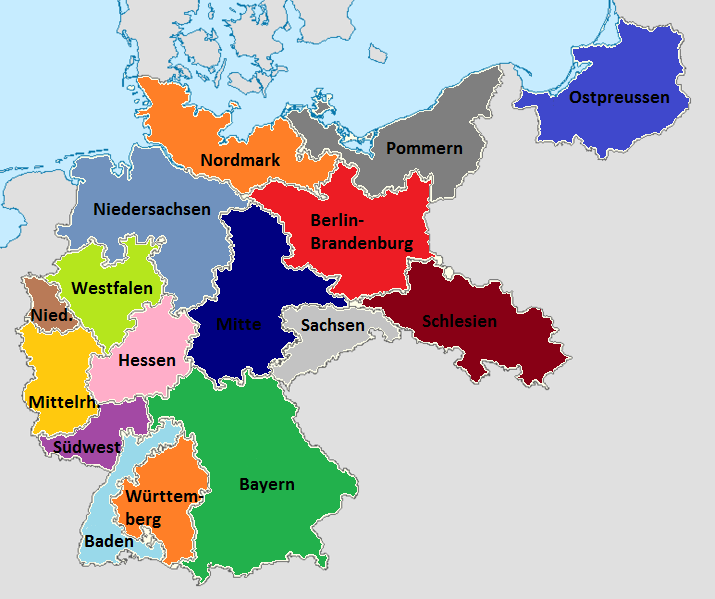
The initial 16 districts of the Gauliga from 1933 to 1938

The 1938–39 Gauliga was the sixth season of the Gauliga, the first tier of the football league system in Germany from 1933 to 1945. It was the last completed season before the Second World War.

The league operated in eighteen regional divisions, of which the Gauliga Sudetenland was played in a knock-out format of regional champions, with the league containing 175 clubs all up, five less than the previous season. The league champions entered the 1939 German football championship, won by FC Schalke 04 who defeated Admira Wien 9–0 in the final. It was Schalke's fourth national championship, with the club winning six championships all up during the Gauliga era.

Four clubs remained unbeaten during the league season, those being FC Schalke 04, Hindenburg Allenstein, VfR Mannheim and SV Dessau 05. At the other end of the table one club finished the season without a win, SV Algermissen. Hamburger SV scored the most goals of any Gauliga club with 87 while ESV Wacker Wiener Neustadt conceded the most with 87. SV Dessau 05 and Hamburger SV achieved the highest points total with 35 while SV Algermissen earned the least with two points to its name.

The 1938–39 season saw the fifth edition of the Tschammerpokal, now the DFB-Pokal. The 1939 edition was won by 1. FC Nürnberg, defeating SV Waldhof Mannheim 2–0 on 28 April 1940.

The 1938–39 season saw an expansion of the number of the Gauligas from 16 to 18. In March 1938 Nazi Germany annexed Austria in what is commonly referred to as the Anschluss, with the Gauliga Ostmark formed as a consequence. In September 1938, through the Munich Agreement, Nazi Germany acquired the Sudetenland from Czechoslovakia which resulted in the formation of the Gauliga Sudetenland. This was followed by the German occupation of Czechoslovakia in March 1939 but the Gauliga Böhmen und Mähren was only organised in 1943 in the region.

In the part of Czechoslovakia annexed by Germany in March 1939, the Protectorate of Bohemia and Moravia, the Czechoslovak First League continued its 1938–39 season separately from the Gauligas and the German championship.

== Champions ==
Map of Nazi Germany showing its expansion 1938 -1945

The 1938–39 Gauliga champions qualified for the group stage of the German championship. Dresdner SC, Hamburger SV, Admira Wien and FC Schalke 04 won their championship groups and advanced to the semi-finals with the latter two reaching the championship final which Schalke won.

FC Schalke 04 won their sixth consecutive Gauliga title, Fortuna Düsseldorf their fourth, SV Dessau 05 and Hamburger SV won their third consecutive one while Vorwärts-Rasensport Gleiwitz defended their 1937–38 Gauliga title.

Club	League	No. of clubs
VfR Mannheim	Gauliga Baden	10
FC Schweinfurt 05	Gauliga Bayern (1938–39 season)	10
Blau-Weiß 90 Berlin	Gauliga Berlin-Brandenburg	10
CSC 03 Kassel	Gauliga Hessen	10
SV Dessau 05	Gauliga Mitte	10
SpVgg Sülz 07	Gauliga Mittelrhein	10
Fortuna Düsseldorf	Gauliga Niederrhein	10
VfL Osnabrück	Gauliga Niedersachsen	10
Hamburger SV	Gauliga Nordmark	11
Admira Wien	Gauliga Ostmark ^{‡} (1938–39 season)	10
Hindenburg Allenstein	Gauliga Ostpreußen	10
Viktoria Stolp	Gauliga Pommern	10
Dresdner SC	Gauliga Sachsen	10
Vorwärts-Rasensport Gleiwitz	Gauliga Schlesien	10
Warnsdorfer FK	Gauliga Sudetenland ^{‡}	4
Wormatia Worms	Gauliga Südwest	10
FC Schalke 04	Gauliga Westfalen	10
Stuttgarter Kickers	Gauliga Württemberg	10

- ^{‡} Denotes new Gauligas for the 1938–39 season.
