= Werner Baßler =

German footballer (1921–1999)

Personal information
- Date of birth: 2 October 1921
- Place of birth: Trippstadt, Germany
- Date of death: 21 October 1999 (aged 78)
- Place of death: Germany
- Position: Forward

Youth career
- 1. FC Kaiserslautern

Senior career*
Years	Team	Apps	(Gls)
1938–1942	1. FC Kaiserslautern		
1942–1944	Holstein Kiel	2+	(3+)
1944–1951	1. FC Kaiserslautern		(199)
1951–1953	VfR Mannheim		(22+)
1953–1957	1. FC Kaiserslautern		
1957–1960	VfR Kaiserslautern	22+	(39+)
Total		295+	(263+)
- * Club domestic league appearances and goals

Werner Baßler (2 October 1921 – 21 October 1999) was a German footballer who played as a forward.

== Early life ==
Baßler's footballing career started at the youth side of 1. FC Kaiserslautern, where he played with Fritz Walter and Richard Schneider. He was a multi-talented athlete who played handball, track, field and he also cycled.

== Career ==
=== Gauliga ===
In 1938 Baßler appeared in the first team of 1. FC Kaiserslautern. In the 1939–40 season were the champions of the Saarpfalz region in the Gauliga Südwest, however could not advance to the finals of the German Championship, after losing 7–4 on aggregate to Kickers Offenbach. In the 1941–42 Gauliga Westmark season, Baßler scored 21 goals. For the first time 1. FC Kaiserslautern advanced to the German Championship. On 10 May 1942, 1. FC Kaiserslautern beat Waldhof Mannheim 7–1 with Baßler scoring a goal. 1. FC Kaiserslautern could not progress further, as they lost 9–3, on aggregate, to a Schalke 04 side that boasted the likes of Fritz Szepan and Ernst Kuzorra.

Baßler was drafted into the navy in 1942 and would play as a war-guest for Holstein Kiel for two seasons. He would play just a few more games for 1. FC Kaiserslautern before the introduction of the Oberliga.

=== Oberliga ===
Baßler's first game in the Oberliga came against Phoenix Ludwigshafen, He scored 3 in a 10–0 victory. Up until 1950–51, 1. FC Kaiserslautern would win four Oberliga Sudwest championships. 1947–48 was a great year for 1. FC Kaiserslautern, as they won the championship with a 151:18 ratio of goals scored to goals conceded. Baßler ended up with 28 goals in the championship, which put him in 4th place. First place was none other than teammate Ottmar Walter with 51 goals. The next season would be even better for Baßler as he totalled a record 54 goals for 1. FC Kaiserslautern. The following season Baßler scored another 45 goals, equal to Ottmar Walter. In 1951, Baßler finished with 25 goals, behind Ottmar Walter, who scored 28 goals. In 1951, together with the 1. FC Kaiserslautern team, he was awarded the Silver Laurel Leaf.

In the Oberliga Südwest he played 215 games from 1945 to 1957, scoring 226 goals. Baßler played his last competitive game for the Red Devils in the final round of 1957 on 9 June in Hannover, against the defending champions Borussia Dortmund, when Lautern lost 3–2 in front of 75,000 spectators, he had to deal with the 23-year-old Borussia left winger Helmut Kapitulski.

== Later life ==
Baßler was employed as a construction mechanic by the sewing machine manufacturer Pfaff in Kaiserslautern and, after his return from Mannheim, also ran a lottery and pools acceptance point. According to his own records, Baßler scored at least 1388 goals during his career.

== Career statistics ==
=== Club ===
Appearances and goals by club, season and competition
Club	Season	League			German Championship (Note: Before the Bundesliga, the national champion was determined in a series of knock-out games after the domestic league ended.)		DFB-Pokal		other		Total	
Club	Season	Division	Apps	Goals	Apps	Goals	Apps	Goals	Apps	Goals	Apps	Goals
fc kaiserslautern	1939-1940	Oberliga sudwest	11+	5+	0	0	?	?	6+	2+	17+	7+
fc kaiserslautern	1940–41	Oberliga sudwest	12+	6+	0	0	3+	2+	0	0	15+	8+
fc kaiserslautern	1941–42	Oberliga sudwest	17+	21	2	1	1+	2+	0	0	20+	24+
fc holstein kiel	1942-43	Oberliga sudwest	2	?	?	?	?	?	?	?	2	0
fc holstein kiel	1943-44	Oberliga sudwest	?	?	2	3	1	0	0	0	3+	3+
fc kaiserslautern	1943–44	Oberliga sudwest	5+	2+	0	0	?	?	6+	1+	11+	3+
fc kaiserslautern	1944–45	Oberliga sudwest	0	0	0	0	0	0	0	0	0	0
fc kaiserslautern	1945–46	Oberliga sudwest	11+	33	0	0	0	0	0	0	11+	33
fc kaiserslautern	1946–47	Oberliga sudwest	14	14	0	0	2+	0+	6+	8+	22+	22+
fc kaiserslautern	1947–48	Oberliga sudwest	22+	28	3	3	?	?	1+	0+	26+	31+
fc kaiserslautern	1948–49	Oberliga sudwest	19+	54	5	2	0	0	2	1	26+	57
fc kaiserslautern	1949–50	Oberliga sudwest	27	46	3	1	0	0	0	0	30	47
fc kaiserslautern	1950–51	Oberliga sudwest	26	25	7	6	0	0	0	0	33	31
vrf mannheim	1951-52	Oberliga sudwest	30	22	0	0	?	?	?	?	30	22
vrf mannheim	1952-53	Oberliga sudwest	28	4	0	0	?	?	?	?	28	4
fc kaiserslautern	1953–54	Oberliga sudwest	28	13	3	0	?	?	?	?	31	13
fc kaiserslautern	1954–55	Oberliga sudwest	29	5	7	2	3	0	0	0	39	7
fc kaiserslautern	1955–56	Oberliga sudwest	23	5*	6	0	0	0	0	0	29	5*
fc kaiserslautern	1956–57	Oberliga sudwest	11	4*	2	0	0	0	0	0	13	4*
VfR Kaiserslautern	1958–59	Oberliga sudwest	?	28	?	?	?	?	?	?	?	28
VfR Kaiserslautern	1959–60	Oberliga sudwest	21	11	?	?	?	?	?	?	21	11
Total		Oberliga sudwest	336+	326+	40	18	10+	4+	21+	12+	407+	360+!

== Honours ==
fc kaiserslautern

- german football championship : 1950-1951 runner-up:1947-1948 1953-1954 1954-1955
- oberliga sudwest: 1946/47 1947/48 1948/49 1949/50 1950/51 1953/54 1954/55 1955/56 1956/57
- gauliga westwark: 1941/42

fc holstein kiel

- gauliga holstein: 1942/43 1943/44

Individual

- oberliga sudwest top scorer 1945/1946(33 goals) 1948/1949 (54 goals) 1949/1950 (45 goals)
- oberliga top scorer 1948/1949 (54 goals) 1949/1950 (45 goals)
- German football championship top scorer 1948(3 goals) 1951 (6 goals)
