= Fritz Szepan =

German footballer (1907–1974)

Personal information
- Full name: Friedrich Szepan
- Date of birth: 2 September 1907
- Place of birth: Gelsenkirchen, German Empire
- Date of death: 14 December 1974 (aged 67)
- Place of death: Gelsenkirchen, West Germany
- Position: Forward

Youth career
- 1924–1925: Schalke 04

Senior career*
Years	Team	Apps	(Gls)
1925–1950	Schalke 04	393	(284)

International career
1929–1939	Germany	34	(8)

Managerial career
- 1949–1954: Schalke 04
- 1954–1956: Rot-Weiss Essen
Medal record
Men's football
Representing Germany
FIFA World Cup
Third place	1934 Italy
- * Club domestic league appearances and goals

Friedrich "Fritz" Szepan (2 September 1907 – 14 December 1974) was a German footballer in the period leading up to and including World War II. He spent his entire career with Schalke 04 where he won six national championships and one German Cup. He is commonly regarded as one of the greatest Schalke players of all time. To celebrate the 100th birthday of the club, the supporters voted the Schalker Jahrhundertelf, the "Team of the century": he was included in the midfield. From 1929 to 1938 he played for the Germany national team which he led as captain in 30 matches and during two World Cups.

== Career ==
=== Youth ===
Szepan was born in 1907 in the industrial town of Gelsenkirchen, in a family that came to Gelsenkirchen from the East Prussian Kreis Neidenburg. His father moved to the industrial centre of the Ruhr area to find work in the mining industry. In the typical working-class milieu of the "Kohlenpott", young Fritz grew up as one of six children in the family. The straw-blonde boy played soccer in the neighborhood street teams. After leaving school without a degree, Szepan completed an apprenticeship as a tinsmith at Küppersbusch and also ensured that his company's apprentice football team was successful. He joined Schalke 04 as a youth player in 1924 and remained with the side until his retirement in 1950. He first played for the senior side at the age of 17 in 1924. At the instigation of his friend Ernst Kuzorra, Szepan joined the first team squad of FC Schalke 04 in 1925 at the age of 18. He and his brother-in-law Ernst Kuzorra led Schalke during the era of the team's greatest success in the 1930s when it was the dominant club in Germany. Together they established the famous "Schalker Kreisel" system that used short flat passes to overwhelm their opponent's defence.

=== Career at FC Schalke 04 ===
After Kuzorra and Szepan had established themselves in Schalke's first team, it developed into a German club team. In 1934, Schalke won the German championship for the first time, beating 1. FC Nürnberg 2-1 in the final, in which Szepan equalized in the 88th minute, and Kuzorra scored the winning goal.

The central figures in the game system were Kuzorra and Szepan. Szepan compensated for a lack of liveliness and speed with game intelligence, overview, technique and positional play. As a playmaker, Szepan was considered the thinker and leader of the team, while Kuzorra was a striker and executor. Because of his understanding of the game and his leadership on the pitch, Szepan was subsequently described as a "pre-war cymbal builder". Nominally a striker, he usually let himself fall back and directed the game from deep. Constructive play structure, under the direction of Szepan, was described as the key to the success of Schalke Kreisel.

In 1935 the championship title was defended with a 6:4 win over VfB Stuttgart. Two years later, the “Knappen” won the first double in German football history with a championship and DFB-Pokal. By 1942, Schalke had been in the championship final four more times, winning in 1939, 1940 and 1942. Schalke 04 dominated German football during this period and laid the foundation for the “Schalke legend”. The 1942 championship was to be the last championship for Schalke 04 in World War II and at the same time the last title for 16 years. After the end of the war, “blonde Fritz” helped rebuild FC Schalke before ending his career in 1949 due to knee problems and back pain. On 12 November 1950, Szepan and his brother-in-law Kuzorra officially bid farewell in a game against Clube Atlético Mineiro in Schalke's Glückauf-Kampfbahn.

=== Career in the national team ===
Unlike Kuzorra, Szepan also had a successful international career. From 1929 to 1939 he played for the Germany national team which he led as captain in 30 matches and during two World Cups. In 1938, Szepan was named captain of the "Unified Germany" team shortly after the Anschluss. He started out at inside right but gained international recognition in his interpretation of the centre half role. Szepan made the play of Schalke and the Germany national side at a time when other centre halves were largely committed to covering the opposing centre forward. He however was not an easy-going player and declared his retirement from international play more than once. Szepan had a comeback in late 1936, playing at inside left. His displays again reached the high level of his 1934 World Cup performance and by 1937 Szepan was the outstanding playmaker of the Breslau XI.

After his retirement in 1950, Szepan remained active as coach for Wuppertaler SV, Schalke 04 and Rot-Weiß Essen, leading that club to the German championship in 1955. He served Schalke again as club president from 1964 to 1967. He died on 14 December 1974 in his hometown Gelsenkirchen.

In his 1978 book "Fussball", Helmut Schön characterised Szepan as follows:

"One from the gallery of great playmakers, not markedly pacy, but talented to make the game pacy. He knew how to play directly but also capable of great solos - all that while being strong enough defensively to have played as a stopper. A commander."

== Career statistics ==
=== Club ===
Appearances and goals by club, season and competition
Club	Season	League			German Champ'ship		Cup (Note: Tschammer-Pokal (forerunner of today's DFB-Pokal))		Other (Note: Includes Ruhr / Western German championship (1926–1933), Westphalian Cup (1943), Westphalian / British zone championship (1947))		Total	
Club	Season	Division	Apps	Goals	Apps	Goals	Apps	Goals	Apps	Goals	Apps	Goals
Schalke 04	1924–26	Emscher-Kreisliga	5	7	—		—		—		5	7
Schalke 04	1926–27	Gauliga Ruhr	11	12	1	0	—		8	0	20	12
Schalke 04	1927–28	Gauliga Ruhr	10	7	1	1	—		9	4	20	12
Schalke 04	1928–29	Gauliga Ruhr	13	18	2	3	—		8	10	23	31
Schalke 04	1929–30	Gauliga Ruhr	16	11	2	1	—		6	5	24	17
Schalke 04	1930–31	Gauliga Ruhr	0	0	—		—		="2"|—		0	0
Schalke 04	1931–32	Gauliga Ruhr	10	14	3	2	—		5	4	18	20
Schalke 04	1932–33	Gauliga Ruhr	14	7	4	2	—		5	6	23	15
Schalke 04	1933–34	Gauliga Westfalen	16	5	8	4	—		—		24	9
Schalke 04	1934–35	Gauliga Westfalen	6	4	7	2	—		—		13	6
Schalke 04	1935–36	Gauliga Westfalen	15	8	8	3	6	3	—		29	14
Schalke 04	1936–37	Gauliga Westfalen	14	15	8	6	6	2	—		28	23
Schalke 04	1937–38	Gauliga Westfalen	9	8	9	3	4	2	—		22	13
Schalke 04	1938–39	Gauliga Westfalen	16	10	8	5	1	0	—		25	15
Schalke 04	1939–40	Gauliga Westfalen	17	14	8	7	2	5	—		27	26
Schalke 04	1940–41	Gauliga Westfalen	17	11	8	6	3	3	—		28	20
Schalke 04	1941–42	Gauliga Westfalen	16	12	5	8	5	0	—		26	20
Schalke 04	1942–43	Gauliga Westfalen	17	16	3	1	4	1	4	5	28	23
Schalke 04	1943–44	Gauliga Westfalen	13	15	2	2	4	3	—		19	20
Schalke 04	1944–45	Gauliga Westfalen	0	0	—		—		—		0	0
Schalke 04	1945–46	Landesliga Westfalen	9	3	—		—		—		9	3
Schalke 04	1946–47	Landesliga Westfalen	11	1	—		—		2	1	13	2
Schalke 04	1947–48	Oberliga West	6	1	—		—		—		6	1
Schalke 04	1948–49	Oberliga West	4	0	—		—		—		4	0
Career total			265	199	87	56	35	19	47	35	434	309

=== International ===
Appearances and goals by national team and year
National team	Year	Apps	Goals
Germany	1929	1	1
Germany	1930	1	0
Germany	1931	1	0
Germany	1932	0	0
Germany	1933	0	0
Germany	1934	7	1
Germany	1935	3	0
Germany	1936	6	1
Germany	1937	8	2
Germany	1938	4	1
Germany	1939	3	2
Total		34	8

== Trivia ==
- He and fellow Schalke star Ernst Kuzorra married each other's sisters, and thus became brothers-in-law.

Sporting positions
Preceded by Ernst Albrecht	Germany captain 1934–1939	Succeeded by Paul Janes
