= 1935 German football championship =

1935 German championship
Deutsche Fußballmeisterschaft
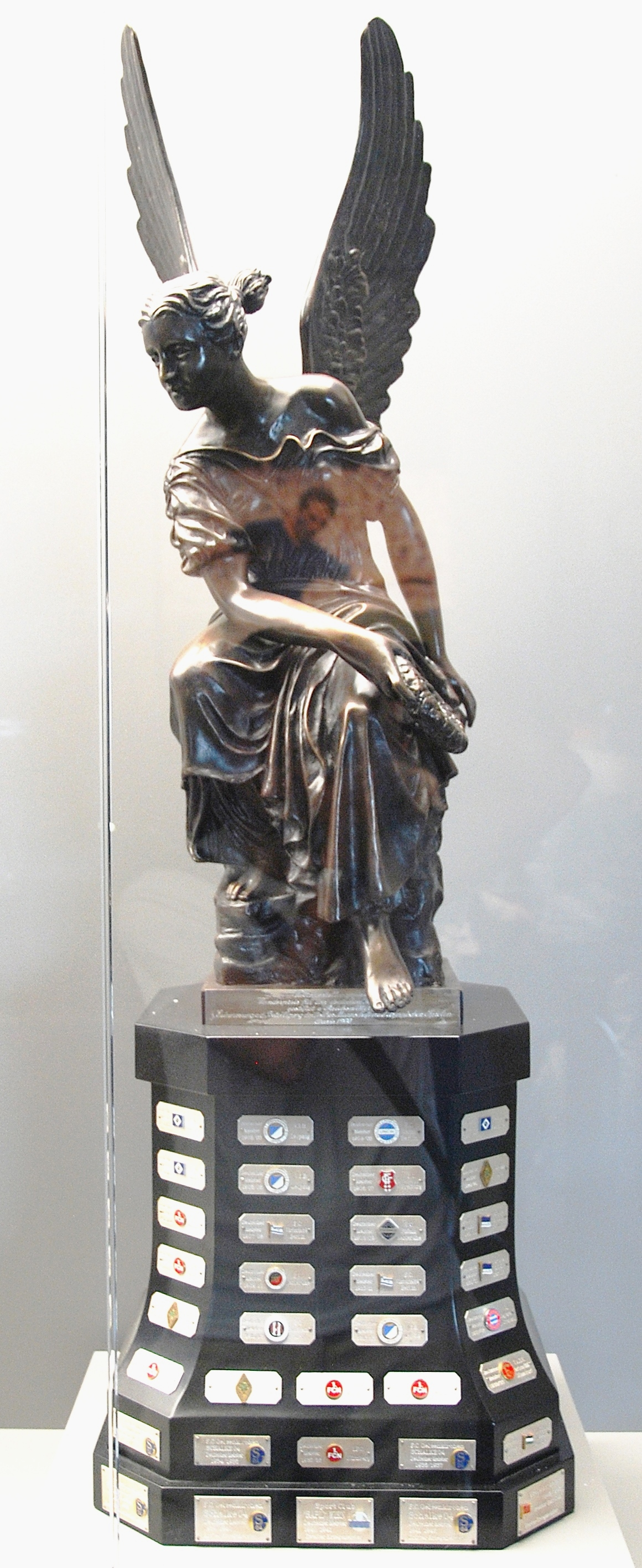
- Replica of the Viktoria trophy

Tournament details
- Country: Germany
- Dates: 7 April – 23 June
- Teams: 16

Final positions
- Champions: Schalke 04; 2nd German title
- Runners-up: VfB Stuttgart

Tournament statistics
- Matches played: 51
- Goals scored: 237 (4.65 per match)
- Top goal scorer: Ernst Poertgen (11 goals)

The 1935 German football championship, the 28th edition of the competition, was won by Schalke 04 by defeating VfB Stuttgart 6–4 in the final. It was Schalke's second consecutive championship and second overall, with four more titles to follow until 1942 and a seventh one in 1958. For Stuttgart it was the club's first appearance in the final, with three more to follow between 1950 and 1953.

The 1935 final produced the most goals scored in a final during the history of the competition, exceeding the nine scored in the 1903 and 1930 final. Schalke's Ernst Poertgen became the 1935 championship's top scorer with eleven goals.

The sixteen 1934–35 Gauliga champions competed in a group stage of four groups of four teams each, with the group winners advancing to the semi-finals. The two semi-final winners then contested the 1935 championship final.

== Qualified teams ==
The teams qualified through the 1934–35 Gauliga season:

Club	Qualified from
VfR Mannheim	Gauliga Baden
SpVgg Fürth	Gauliga Bayern
Hertha BSC	Gauliga Berlin-Brandenburg
FC Hanau 93	Gauliga Hessen
SV Jena	Gauliga Mitte
VfR Köln	Gauliga Mittelrhein
VfL 06 Benrath	Gauliga Niederrhein
Hannover 96	Gauliga Niedersachsen
Eimsbütteler TV	Gauliga Nordmark
Yorck Boyen Insterburg	Gauliga Ostpreußen
SC Stettin	Gauliga Pommern
PSV Chemnitz	Gauliga Sachsen
Vorwärts-Rasensport Gleiwitz	Gauliga Schlesien
Phönix Ludwigshafen	Gauliga Südwest
Schalke 04	Gauliga Westfalen
VfB Stuttgart	Gauliga Württemberg

== Competition ==
=== Group 1 ===
Group 1 was contested by the champions of the Gauligas Brandenburg, Ostpreußen, Sachsen and Schlesien:

Pos	Team	Pld	W	D	L	GF	GA	GR	Pts	Qualification	PSV	BSC	VRG	YBI
1	PSV Chemnitz	6	5	0	1	22	7	3.143	10	Advance to semi-finals	—	1–2	2–1	6–1
2	Hertha BSC	6	4	0	2	22	8	2.750	8		1–2	—	2–0	7–3
3	Vorwärts-Rasensport Gleiwitz	6	2	1	3	9	11	0.818	5		1–3	2–1	—	2–2
4	Yorck Boyen Insterburg	6	0	1	5	8	35	0.229	1		1–8	0–9	1–3	—

Source: RSSSF
Rules for classification: 1) Points; 2) Goal ratio.

=== Group 2 ===
Group 2 was contested by the champions of the Gauligas Nordmark, Niedersachsen, Pommern and Westfalen:

Pos	Team	Pld	W	D	L	GF	GA	GR	Pts	Qualification	S04	H96	ETV	SSC
1	Schalke 04	6	5	0	1	27	6	4.500	10	Advance to semi-finals	—	3–2	4–0	9–1
2	Hannover 96	6	4	0	2	24	12	2.000	8		1–4	—	9–3	5–0
3	Eimsbütteler TV	6	2	1	3	11	20	0.550	5		2–1	1–3	—	3–1
4	Stettiner SC	6	0	1	5	5	29	0.172	1		0–6	1–4	2–2	—

Source: RSSSF
Rules for classification: 1) Points; 2) Goal ratio.

=== Group 3 ===
Group 3 was contested by the champions of the Gauligas Baden, Mittelrhein, Niederrhein and Südwest:

Pos	Team	Pld	W	D	L	GF	GA	GR	Pts	Qualification	BEN	LUD	MAN	VRK
1	VfL Benrath	6	5	1	0	17	5	3.400	11	Advance to semi-finals	—	0–0	3–2	5–0
2	Phönix Ludwigshafen	6	4	1	1	19	3	6.333	9		1–2	—	5–0	4–1
3	VfR Mannheim	6	1	0	5	9	21	0.429	2		2–3	0–5	—	2–3
4	VfR Köln	6	1	0	5	6	22	0.273	2		0–4	0–4	2–3	—

Source: RSSSF
Rules for classification: 1) Points; 2) Goal ratio.

=== Group 4 ===
Group 4 was contested by the champions of the Gauligas Bayern, Hessen, Mitte and Württemberg:

Pos	Team	Pld	W	D	L	GF	GA	GR	Pts	Qualification	VFB	FUE	H93	SVJ
1	VfB Stuttgart	6	4	0	2	13	11	1.182	8	Advance to semi-finals	—	3–2	2–1	1–2
2	SpVgg Fürth	6	3	0	3	11	9	1.222	6		1–4	—	0–1	2–0
3	FC Hanau 93	6	3	0	3	8	8	1.000	6		3–0	1–5	—	0–1
4	1. SV Jena	6	2	0	4	5	9	0.556	4		2–3	0–1	0–2	—

Source: RSSSF
Rules for classification: 1) Points; 2) Goal ratio.

=== Semi-finals ===
Team 1	Score	Team 2
2 June 1935
VfB Stuttgart	4–2	VfL 06 Benrath
Schalke 04	3–2	PSV Chemnitz

=== Final ===
Team 1	Score	Team 2
23 June 1935
Schalke 04	6–4	VfB Stuttgart
