= 1948 German football championship =

1948 German championship
Deutsche Fußballmeisterschaft
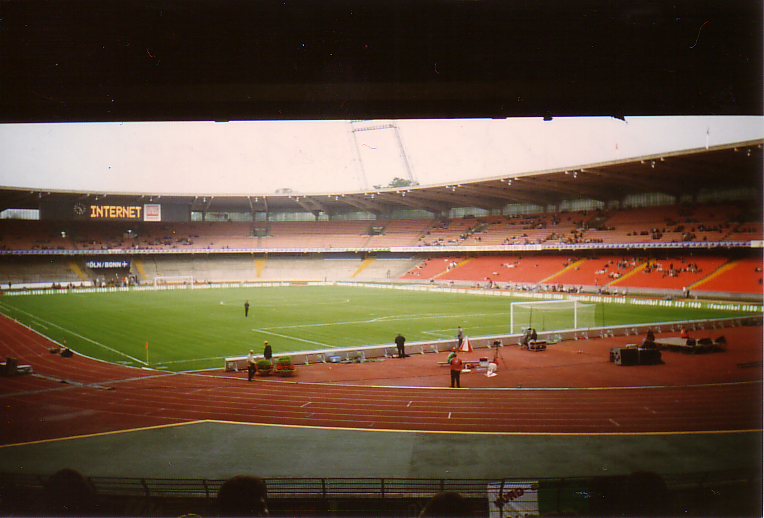
- The Müngersdorfer Stadion in Cologne hosted the final

Tournament details
- Country: Germany
- Dates: 18 July – 8 August
- Teams: 8

Final positions
- Champions: 1. FC Nürnberg; 7th German title
- Runners-up: 1. FC Kaiserslautern

Tournament statistics
- Matches played: 6
- Goals scored: 30 (5 per match)
- Top goal scorer(s): Werner Baßler; Fritz Machate; Heinrich Schaffer; Ottmar Walter (3 goals each)

The 1948 German football championship, the 38th edition of the competition, was the culmination of the 1947–48 football season in Allied-occupied Germany. 1. FC Nürnberg were crowned champions for the seventh time after one-leg knock-out tournament. It was the first time the championship had been played since 1944. It was Nürnberg's tenth appearance in the final. For the losing finalists 1. FC Kaiserslautern, it was the first appearance in the final since the establishment of a national championship in 1903.

Eight teams were to take part in the final stage which was played in a one-leg knock-out tournament, the vice-champions and champions of the British, American and French occupation zones, the champion of the Soviet occupation zone and the Berlin champion. In the end, SG Planitz were not allowed to travel to Stuttgart to play their quarter final against eventual champions Nürnberg.

The 1948 championship is unique as it is the only one of the German championships where no trophy was awarded. The pre-Second World War trophy, the Viktoria had disappeared during the final stages of the war and would not resurface until after the German reunification, while the new trophy, the Meisterschale, would only be ready for the following season.

== Qualified teams ==
The qualified teams through the 1947–48 Oberliga and Ostzonenmeisterschaft seasons:

Club	Qualified from
Hamburger SV	1948 British occupation zone champions
FC St. Pauli	1948 British occupation zone runners-up
SG Planitz	1948 Soviet occupation zone champions
SG Oberschöneweide	1948 Berlin champions
1. FC Kaiserslautern	1948 French occupation zone champions
TuS Neuendorf	1948 French occupation zone runners-up
1. FC Nürnberg	1948 American occupation zone champions
TSV 1860 Munich	1948 American occupation zone runners-up

== Competition ==
=== Quarter-finals ===
18 July 1948

TuS Neuendorf	2 – 1	Hamburger SV
Miltz 67', 74'		Adamkiewicz 53'

Rote Erde, Dortmund
Attendance: 20,000
Referee: Schmetzer (Mannheim)

18 July 1948

1. FC Kaiserslautern	5 – 1 (1 – 0)	TSV 1860 Munich
Christmann 32', 70'; O. Walter 64'; Baßler 83', 85' (pen.)		Thanner 62'

Wormatia-Stadion, Worms
Attendance: 30,000
Referee: Raspel (Düsseldorf)

18 July 1948

SG Oberschöneweide	0 – 7 (0 – 4)	FC St. Pauli
		Michael 3'; Machate 8', 61'; Schaffer 33', 43', 86'; Lehmann 59'

Olympiastadion, Berlin
Attendance: 70,000
Referee: Huhn (Schwaan)

18 July 1948

1. FC Nürnberg	not played	SG Planitz

Kampfbahn, Stuttgart

=== Semi-finals ===
25 July 1948

1. FC Nürnberg	3 – 2 (a.e.t.)	FC St. Pauli
Hagen 31'; Winterstein 33'; Pöschl 94'		Lehmann 56'; Machate 82'

Rhein-Neckar-Stadion, Mannheim
Attendance: 38,000
Referee: Glöckner (Pirmasens)

25 July 1948

1. FC Kaiserslautern	5 – 1 (2 – 0)	TuS Neuendorf
F. Walter 22'; Grewenig 44'; Baßler 53'; O. Walter 83', 85'		Warth 86'

Stadion am Zoo, Wuppertal
Attendance: 50,000
Referee: Strobel (Schwabach)

=== Final ===
8 August 1948

1. FC Nürnberg	2 – 1	1. FC Kaiserslautern
Winterstein 10'; Pöschl 25'		Uebelein 62' (o.g.)

Müngersdorfer Stadion, Cologne
Attendance: 75,000
Referee: E. Burmeister (Hamburg)

1. FC Nürnberg
GK	–	(Allied-occupied Germany) Eduard Schaffer
RB	–	(Allied-occupied Germany) Hans Uebelein
CB	–	(Allied-occupied Germany) Georg Kennemann
LB	–	(Allied-occupied Germany) Adolf Knoll
RH	–	(Allied-occupied Germany) Gerhard Bergner
LH	–	(Allied-occupied Germany) Robert Gebhardt (c)
OR	–	(Allied-occupied Germany) Helmut Herbolsheimer
IR	–	(Allied-occupied Germany) Max Morlock
CF	–	(Allied-occupied Germany) Hans Pöschl
IL	–	(Allied-occupied Germany) Konrad Winterstein
OL	–	(Allied-occupied Germany) Georg Hagen
Manager:
(Allied-occupied Germany) Josef Schmitt

1. FC Kaiserslautern
GK	–	(Allied-occupied Germany) Willi Hölz
RB	–	(Allied-occupied Germany) Rudolf Huppert
CB	–	(Allied-occupied Germany) Werner Liebrich
LB	–	(Allied-occupied Germany) Werner Kohlmeyer
RH	–	(Allied-occupied Germany) Ernst Liebrich
LH	–	(Allied-occupied Germany) Heinz Klee
OR	–	(Allied-occupied Germany) Günther Grewenig
IR	–	(Allied-occupied Germany) Fritz Walter (c)
CF	–	(Allied-occupied Germany) Ottmar Walter
IL	–	(Allied-occupied Germany) Werner Baßler
OL	–	(Allied-occupied Germany) Hans Christmann
Player-manager:
(Allied-occupied Germany) Fritz Walter
