= 1939–40 Gauliga Ostmark =

Gauliga Ostmark
- Season: 1939–40
- Champions: SK Rapid Wien
- Relegated: SV Amateure Fiat
- German championship: SK Rapid Wien

The 1939–40 Gauliga Ostmark was the second season of the Gauliga Ostmark, the first tier of football in German-annexed Austria from 1938 to 1945, officially referred to as Ostmark.

SK Rapid Wien won the championship and qualified for the 1940 German football championship where it lost 2–1 after extra time in the semi-final to Dresdner SC. Rapid went on to win the third-place play-off against SV Waldhof Mannheim.

The Gauliga Ostmark and Gauliga Donau-Alpenland titles from 1938 to 1944, excluding the 1944–45 season which was not completed, are recognised as official Austrian football championships by the Austrian Bundesliga.

== Table ==
The 1939–40 season saw one new club in the league, FC Wien.

Pos	Team	Pld	W	D	L	GF	GA	GD	Pts	Promotion, qualification or relegation
1	SK Rapid Wien (C)	14	9	2	3	50	24	+26	20	Qualification to German championship
2	SC Wacker	14	8	1	5	43	31	+12	17	
3	Wiener Sportclub	14	6	4	4	36	23	+13	16	
4	First Vienna FC	14	7	2	5	36	35	+1	16	
5	SK Admira Wien	14	6	3	5	33	36	−3	15	
6	FK Austria Wien	14	6	0	8	37	42	−5	12	
7	FC Wien	14	4	1	9	24	43	−19	9	
8	SV Amateure Fiat (R)	14	3	1	10	36	61	−25	7	Relegation

Source: RSSSF.com
Rules for classification: 1) Points
(C) Champions; (R) Relegated

== Results ==
Home \ Away	ADM	AFI	AUS	FIR	RAP	WAK	WIE	SPO
SK Admira Wien		2–2	2–3	0–4	1–4	0–5	0–1	3–3
SV Amateure Fiat	5–8		4–5	3–4	1–3	2–8	4–2	1–0
FK Austria Wien	2–3	2–5		2–3	1–4	5–1	5–0	1–4
First Vienna FC	2–3	5–4	1–3		5–5	1–2	2–1	3–0
SK Rapid Wien	1–2	7–1	9–2	1–2		4–1	3–0	0–3
SC Wacker	2–4	4–2	2–0	4–1	3–4		2–3	1–1
FC Wien	1–4	3–2	1–5	3–3	1–4	1–4		4–1
Wiener Sportclub	1–1	8–0	3–1	4–0	1–1	3–4	4–3	

Legend: Blue = home team win; Yellow = draw; Red = away team win.
