= 1942–43 Gauliga Donau-Alpenland =

Gauliga Donau-Alpenland
- Season: 1942–43
- Champions: First Vienna FC
- Relegated: Reichsbahn SG Wien; SK Sturm Graz
- German championship: First Vienna FC

The 1942–43 Gauliga Donau-Alpenland was the fifth season of the Gauliga Donau-Alpenland, formerly the Gauliga Ostmark, the first tier of football in German-annexed Austria from 1938 to 1945.

First Vienna FC won the championship and qualified for the 1943 German football championship, reaching the semi-finals where it lost 2–1 to FV Saarbrücken.

The 1942–43 season saw the ninth edition of the Tschammerpokal, now the DFB-Pokal. The 1943 edition was won by First Vienna FC, defeating Luftwaffe team LSV Hamburg 3–2 after extra time on 31 October 1943.

The Gauliga Ostmark and Gauliga Donau-Alpenland titles from 1938 to 1944, excluding the 1944–45 season which was not completed, are recognised as official Austrian football championships by the Austrian Bundesliga.

== Table ==
The 1942–43 season saw two new clubs in the league, Wiener AC and Reichsbahn SG Wien.

Pos	Team	Pld	W	D	L	GF	GA	GD	Pts	Promotion, qualification or relegation
1	First Vienna FC (C)	20	13	4	3	87	56	+31	30	Qualification to German championship
2	Wiener AC	20	10	5	5	45	29	+16	25	
3	Floridsdorfer AC	20	11	3	6	61	41	+20	25	
4	Wiener Sportclub	20	10	5	5	55	44	+11	25	
5	FK Austria Wien	20	11	2	7	53	52	+1	24	
6	SK Rapid Wien	20	10	2	8	65	53	+12	22	
7	FC Wien	20	7	4	9	48	49	−1	18	
8	Reichsbahn SG Wien (R)	20	6	5	9	38	38	0	17	Relegation
9	SC Wacker	20	5	7	8	32	40	−8	17	
10	SK Admira Wien	20	6	4	10	38	42	−4	16	
11	SK Sturm Graz (R)	20	0	1	19	21	99	−78	1	Relegation

Source: RSSSF.com
Rules for classification: 1) Points
(C) Champions; (R) Relegated

== Results ==
Home \ Away	ADM	AUS	FIR	FLO	RAP	REI	STU	WAK	WIE	WAC	SPO
SK Admira Wien		1–6	2–3	1–3	2–3	1–3	8–1	1–2	3–2	1–1	0–2
FK Austria Wien	2–2		2–9	3–1	1–10	0–3	3–1	0–1	5–3	2–0	3–1
First Vienna FC	3–0	6–3		8–6	6–4	2–2	8–3	4–2	4–2	2–8	2–4
Floridsdorfer AC	3–3	2–1	2–4		7–1	2–1	11–0	2–1	0–0	0–3	3–3
SK Rapid Wien	0–2	2–6	3–3	2–4		2–5	7–1	4–0	4–6	5–1	3–2
Reichsbahn SG Wien	0–2	2–2	3–4	2–3	2–3		3–0	2–2	1–3	0–1	1–3
SK Sturm Graz	2–2	0–6	1–5	2–4	0–4	2–3		0–0	2–6	1–5	1–2
SC Wacker	1–2	0–2	2–2	0–4	1–4	1–0	8–1		2–2	1–1	1–1
FC Wien	0–2	1–2	1–7	3–1	0–3	1–1	4–1	2–1		1–2	5–5
Wiener AC	3–2	6–1	3–3	1–2	0–0	3–2	2–0	1–1	2–1		1–3
Wiener Sportclub	2–1	1–3	3–2	2–1	4–1	2–2	8–2	5–5	1–5	1–2	

Legend: Blue = home team win; Yellow = draw; Red = away team win.
