= 1938–39 Gauliga Ostmark =

Gauliga Ostmark
- Season: 1938–39
- Champions: SK Admira Wien
- Relegated: Grazer SC; SK Amateure Steyr; RB Wacker Wiener Neustadt
- German championship: SK Admira Wien

The 1938–39 Gauliga Ostmark was the inaugural season of the Gauliga Ostmark and organized by the National Socialist League of the Reich for Physical Exercise (German: Nationalsozialistischer Reichsbund für Leibesübungen), the organizing body for sports in Nazi Germany. In March 1938, Nazi Germany annexed Austria in what is commonly referred to as the Anschluss, with the Gauliga Ostmark formed as a consequence. Austria and the Austrian football championship thereby ceased to exist until the end of the Second World War.

SK Admira Wien won the championship and qualified for the 1939 German football championship where it lost 9–0 in the final to FC Schalke 04.

The Gauliga Ostmark and Gauliga Donau-Alpenland titles from 1938 to 1944, excluding the 1944–45 season which was not completed, are recognised as official Austrian football championships by the Austrian Bundesliga.

== Table ==
The 1938–39 season saw four new clubs in the league, SV Amateure Fiat, Grazer SC, SK Amateure Steyr and Reichsbahn Wacker Wiener Neustadt.

Pos	Team	Pld	W	D	L	GF	GA	GD	Pts	Promotion, qualification or relegation
1	SK Admira Wien (C)	18	12	4	2	62	20	+42	28	Qualification to German championship
2	SC Wacker	18	12	2	4	52	27	+25	26	
3	SK Rapid Wien	18	11	3	4	60	29	+31	25	
4	Wiener Sportclub	18	10	4	4	50	28	+22	24	
5	First Vienna FC	18	9	4	5	47	37	+10	22	
6	FK Austria Wien	18	9	3	6	55	40	+15	21	
7	SV Amateure Fiat	18	6	3	9	47	50	−3	15	
8	Grazer SC (R)	18	5	1	12	34	53	−19	11	Relegation
9	SK Amateure Steyr (R)	18	2	0	16	22	75	−53	4	Relegation
10	Reichsbahn Wacker Wiener Neustadt (R)	18	2	0	16	17	87	−70	4	Relegation

Source: RSSSF.com
Rules for classification: 1) Points
(C) Champions; (R) Relegated

== Results ==
Home \ Away	ADM	AFI	AST	AUS	FIR	GRA	RAP	WAK	WWN	SPO
SK Admira Wien		3–4	4–0	3–1	3–3	8–0	4–1	3–2	10–0	0–0
SV Amateure Fiat	2–3		9–2	0–4	2–2	3–4	2–2	2–1	0–0	1–4
SK Amateure Steyr	0–4	2–6		0–3	0–5	2–0	1–3	2–4	2–3	0–2
FK Austria Wien	1–2	4–4	4–1		2–2	3–2	4–0	2–5	8–2	3–3
First Vienna FC	1–4	4–1	6–1	2–3		2–1	0–4	3–6	3–0	4–2
Grazer SC	2–0	5–3	4–1	2–6	1–2		2–6	2–4	5–2	1–1
SK Rapid Wien	0–0	3–2	4–3	5–1	3–1	3–0		0–0	2–0	7–2
SC Wacker	2–4	2–1	7–0	2–1	1–1	2–1	4–3		6–1	2–0
Wacker Wiener Neustadt	0–6	2–4	2–4	1–5	0–1	3–1	1–13	0–2		0–3
Wiener Sportclub	3–1	3–1	5–1	4–0	3–5	2–1	2–1	1–0	12–0	

Legend: Blue = home team win; Yellow = draw; Red = away team win.
