= Ruhrstadion =

Football stadium in Bochum, Germany

Coordinates: 51°29′24″N 7°14′12″E

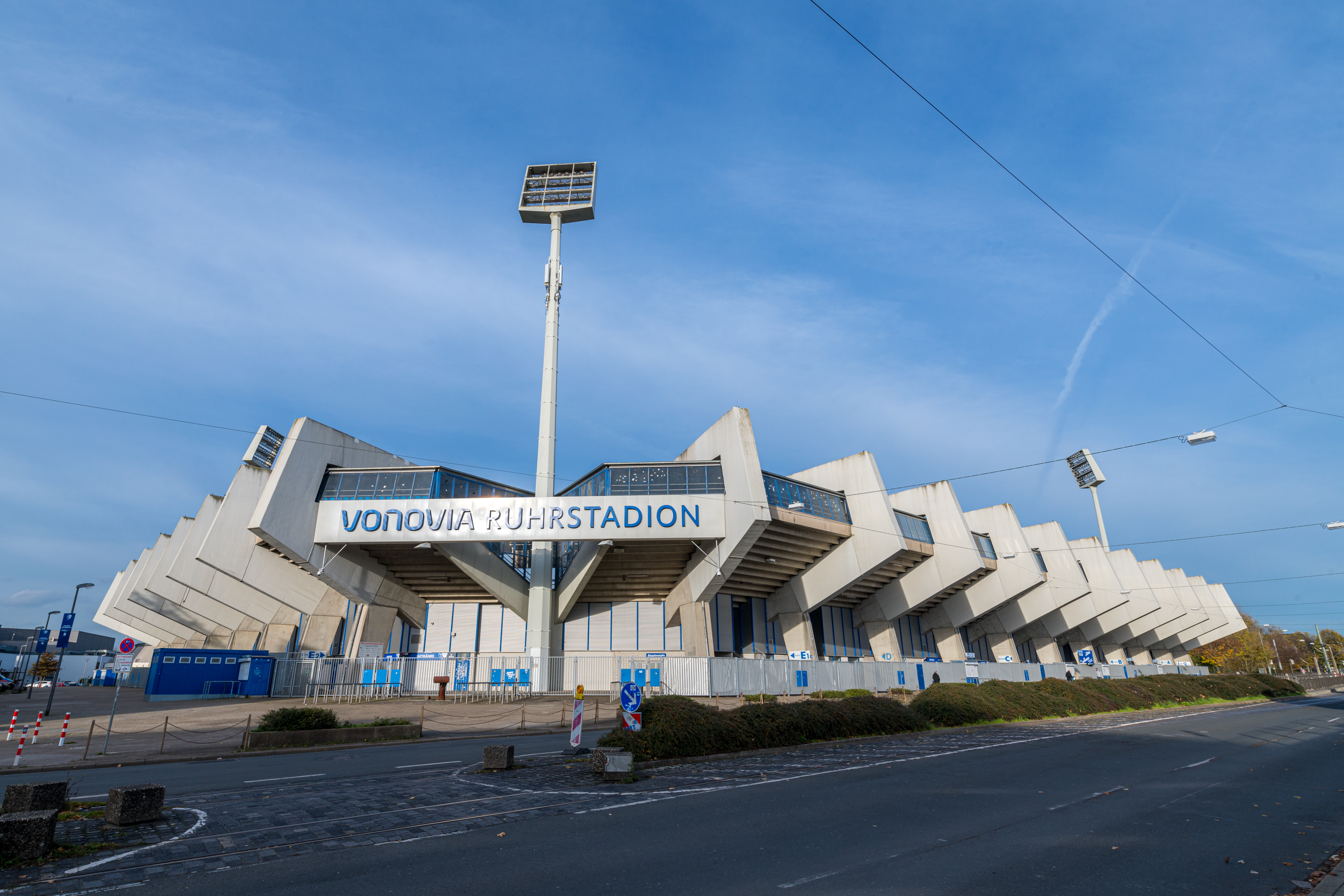
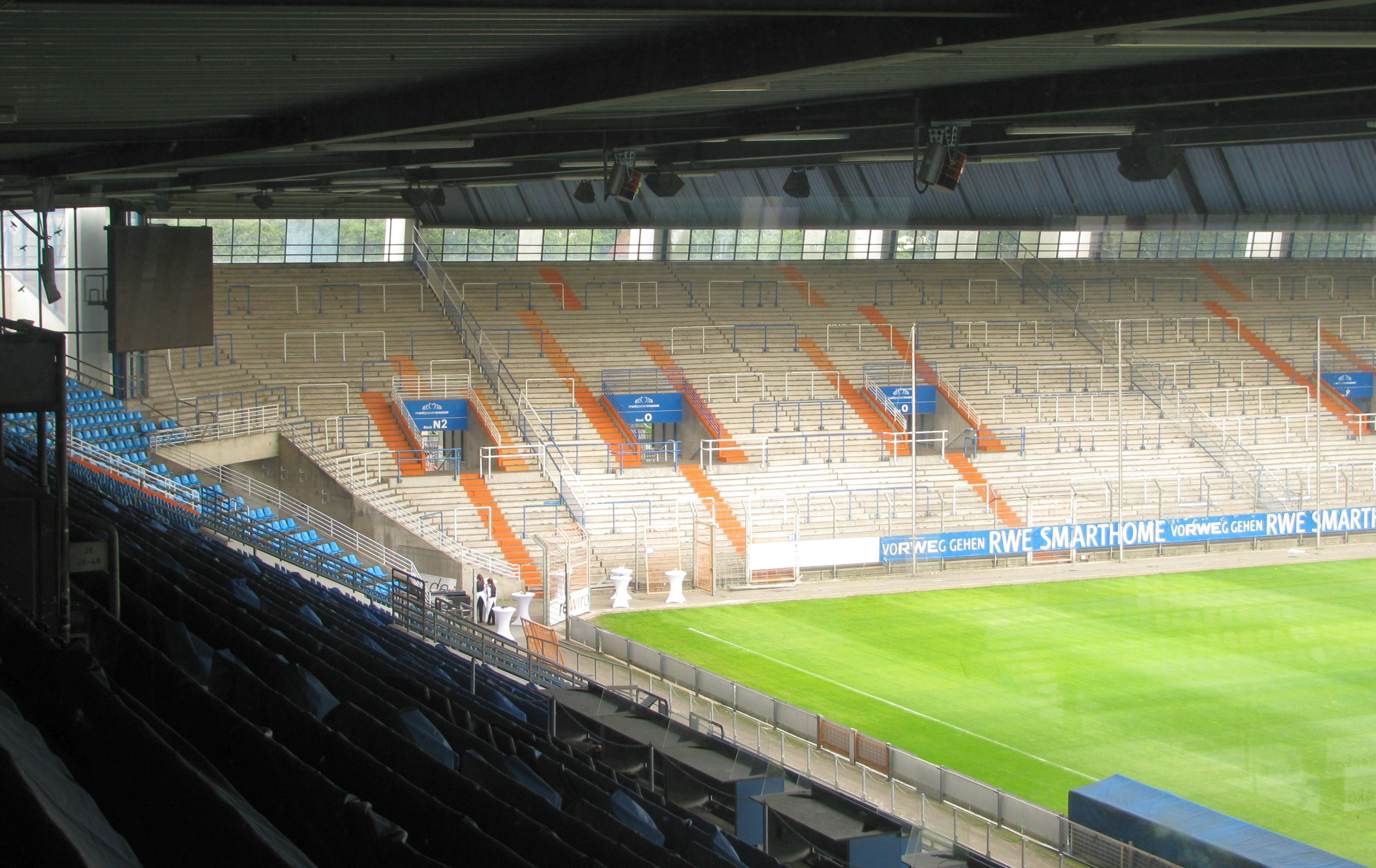
- Interactive map of Ruhrstadion
- Full name: Vonovia Ruhrstadion
- Former names: SuS-Sportplatz an der Castroper Straße (1911–1919); TuS-Sportplatz an der Castroper Straße (1919–1921); Stadion an der Castroper Straße (1921–1979); Ruhrstadion (1979–2006) rewirpowerSTADION (2006–2016)
- Location: Castroper Straße 145, 44791 Bochum, Germany
- Owner: VfL Bochum
- Operator: VfL Bochum
- Capacity: 26,000
- Surface: grass
- Field size: 105 × 68 m

Construction
- Built: 1921
- Opened: 8 October 1911
- Renovated: 1997
- Expanded: March 1976 – July 1979

Tenants
- VfL Bochum (1938–present); TuS Bochum (1919–1938); SuS Bochum (1911–1919); Germany national football team (selected matches)

Ruhrstadion (German pronunciation: [ˈʁuːɐ̯ˌʃtaːdi̯ɔn]) is a football stadium in Bochum, Germany. It is the home ground for the VfL Bochum and has a capacity of 27,599. It was known as rewirpowerSTADION [ʁeˈviːɐ̯paʊ.ɐˌʃtaːdi̯ɔn] (or, rarely, [ʁəˈviːɐ̯-]) from 2006 to 2016, also for sponsorship reasons.

== History ==
In 1911 the Spiel und Sport Bochum leased a meadow from a local farmer as their new home ground. The club played the first match at the new venue against the VfB Hamm in front of 500 spectators. The TuS Bochum did not build a stadium until after World War I as late as 1921.

The stadium has a capacity of 27,599 people. The original capacity was over 50,000 but was decreased by numerous modifications.

The stadium was expanded between March 1976 and July 1979 and the first game was between the VfL Bochum and SG Wattenscheid 09 on 21 July 1979. This expansion could technically count as a complete rebuild; legally, it is officially an expansion.

David Bowie performed at the stadium during his Serious Moonlight Tour on 15 June 1983. Herbert Grönemeyer performed multiple sold-out concerts at the stadium in 1985, 1994, 1998, 2003, 2007, 2009, 2012, 2015 and 2019. Additionally, his song Bochum is sung before the kickoff of every home match of VfL Bochum, with the final line before the final chorus of the piece bearing special significance to the club. Herbert has been an honorary member of the club since 2006.

The stadium hosted a UEFA Champions League match between CSKA Moscow and Rangers in December 1992 because the teams weren't able to play in Moscow for weather reasons.

In 2006, a five-year naming rights deal was struck with Stadtwerke Bochum to rebrand the stadium as "rewirpowerSTADION". In 2016, a new naming rights deal was struck with the German housing association Vonovia, and the stadium was rebranded as Vonovia Ruhrstadion.

Germany international matches
Date	Result	Opponent	Competition
2 July 1922	0–0	Hungary	Friendly
23 September 1981	7–1	Finland	FIFA World Cup 1982 qualifying
11 May 1986	1–1	Yugoslavia	Friendly
14 April 1993	6–1	Ghana	Friendly

=== 2011 FIFA Women's World Cup ===
Date	Time (CET)	Team #1	Result	Team #2	Round	Spectators
27 June 2011	15:00	Japan	2–1	New Zealand	Group B	12,538
30 June 2011	18:00	Canada	0–4	France	Group A	16,591
3 July 2011	20:45	Australia	3–2	Equatorial Guinea	Group D	15,640
6 July 2011	20:45	North Korea	0–0	Colombia	Group C	7,805

== See also ==
- List of football stadiums in Germany
- Lists of stadiums
