= NSTG Aussig =

German football club

- Full name: Nationalsozialistische Turngemeinde Aussig
- Founded: 1939
- Ground: Aussig-Prödlitz; Städtische Kampfbahn Kleische
- Capacity: 6,000/6,000
- League: Gauliga Sudetenland
- 2007–08: defunct
Home colours	Away colours

NSTG Aussig was an ethnically-German football club from what was known as the town of Aussig, Sudetenland and is today Ústí nad Labem, Czech Republic. The team played in the regional top-flight Gauliga Sudetenland through most of World War II.

== History ==
On 30 September 1938, German-speaking areas of Czechoslovakia known as the Sudetenland were annexed by Nazi Germany under the terms of the Munich Agreement. Ethnically-German football clubs in the territory became part of German competition in 1938–39. That season was used to qualify clubs for participation in the Gauliga Sudetenland (I). The regime subsequently forced the merger of existing clubs into new sports associations each known as Nationalsozialistische Turngemeinde (National Socialist Gymnastics Community).

NSTG Aussig was formed through the 1939 union of a number of smaller local sides around the core of Deutscher Fußballklub Aussig. The team played five seasons in the regional top flight division in the Gauliga Sudeten, Staffel 2 (1939–41, 1943–44) and the Gauliga Mitte (1941–43) with their best results coming as second-place finishes in 1942 and 1943. The Aussig side disappeared with the end of World War II and the return of the Sudetenland to Czechoslovakia.
