= NSTG Asch =

German football club

- Full name: Nationalsozialistische Turngemeinde Asch
- Founded: 1939
- Dissolved: 1945
- Ground: Prexflur
- Capacity: 3,000
- League: Gauliga Sudetenland
Home colours	Away colours

NSTG Asch was an ethnically-German football club from what was known as the town of Asch, Sudetenland and is today Aš, Czech Republic. The team played a single incomplete season in the regional top-flight Gauliga Sudetenland.

== History ==
On 30 September 1938, German-speaking areas of Czechoslovakia known as the Sudetenland were annexed by Nazi Germany under the terms of the Munich Agreement. Ethnically-German football clubs in the territory became part of German competition in 1938–39. That season was used to qualify clubs for participation in the Gauliga Sudetenland (I). The regime subsequently forced the merger of existing clubs into new sports associations each known as Nationalsozialistische Turngemeinde (National Socialist Gymnastics Community).

NSTG Asch played just part of one season (1940–41) in the Gauliga Sudetenland before voluntarily withdrawing from upper-level competition along with several other weak, under-manned sides in the division. It disappeared with the end of World War II and the return of the Sudetenland to Czechoslovakia.

=== Deutscher Sportverein Asch ===
Nationalsozialistische Turngemeinde Asch was formed through the 1939 union of Fußballverein Sportbrüder Asch and Deutscher Sportverein Asch. Of these two clubs, DSV was the more prominent side having played first division football in an ethnically German league that was part of the national football competition, the Czechoslovak Football Association (ČsFA), that emerged in 1922 following Czechoslovakia's independence from the Austro-Hungarian Empire in October 1918.

At the time, roughly a fifth of the country's population was made up of ethnic Germans, who had established their own football competition, the Deutscher Fussball Verband (DFV), in late 1919. This league eventually became a division called the DFV der ČsFA within the national competition, but continued to stage a separate championship until 1938.
