= Germania Bochum =

Sports club in Bochum, Germany

SV Germania Bochum
- Full name: Sportverein Germania Vorwärts Bochum 1906
- Founded: 1906 as Fußballklub 06 Bochum
- Dissolved: 14 April 1938 (merged into VfL Bochum)
- Ground: Germania Sportplatz
- League: Gauliga Westfalen
- 1937–38: 5th
Home colours	Away colours

Sportverein Germania Vorwärts Bochum 1906 was a German association football club from the city of Bochum, North Rhine-Westphalia.

== History ==
Established in 1906 as Fußballklub 06 Bochum the club was later renamed Sportverein Germania 06 Bochum. Germania absorbed the members of Vorwärts Bochum in 1924 to play as SV Germania Vorwärts Bochum. German football was reorganized in 1933 under the Third Reich into 16 top-flight divisions and Germania became part of the Gauliga Westfalen. The club's best result there came as a second-place finish in 1935–36. The following year the team took part in the 1937 Tschammerpokal tournament, where they were put out in the second round by Berliner SV 92 after having earlier gotten by VfR Köln.

Germania was forced by the Nazi regime to merge with Turn- und Sport Bochum 1908 and Bochumer Turnverein 1848 into the current-day club VfL Bochum on 14 April 1938. After the merger the VfL Bochum continued to compete in the top flight as part of the Gauliga Westfalen.
