= TuS Bochum =

German football club

- Full name: Turn- und Sportverein Bochum 1908
- Founded: 1908 as Spiel und Sport 08 Bochum
- Dissolved: 14 April 1938 (merged into VfL Bochum)
- Ground: Stadion an der Castroper Straße
- League: Bezirksliga Westfalen
- 1937–38: 5th
Home colours	Away colours

Turn- und Sportverein Bochum 1908 was a German association football club from the city of Bochum, North Rhine-Westphalia.

== History ==
The club was established in 1908 as Spiel und Sport 08 Bochum. The first football match at the Castroper Straße (Ruhrstadion) was played by Spiel und Sport on 8 October 1911. On 1 April 1919 the club merged with Turnverein zu Bochum 1848 to form the TuS Bochum 1848. On 1 February 1924 the two clubs from the earlier merger split into the Bochumer Turnverein 1848 (gymnastics department) and Turn- und Sportverein Bochum 1908 (football, track and field, handball, hockey and tennis departments).

German football was reorganized in 1933 under the Third Reich into 16 top-flight divisions and after a divisional title in the Bezirksliga Westfalen (II) followed by a successful promotion playoff, TuS became part of the Gauliga Westfalen (I). The club played just two seasons there and finished their 1936–37 campaign in the relegation zone.

TuS was forced under the Nazi regime into a merger for political reasons with other local clubs. On 14 April 1938, TuS, Germania Bochum, and Turnverein Bochum were formed into current-day side VfL Bochum.

The newly combined club continued to compete in the top flight as part of the Gauliga Westfalen in the place of Germania Bochum.
