= Warnsdorfer FK =

- Club logo
- Full name: Warnsdorfer Fußball Klub
- Founded: 10 January 1931
- Dissolved: 1940
- Ground: Platz am Hauptbahnhof, Varnsdorf

Warnsdorfer Fußball Klub, commonly known as Warnsdorfer FK, was an association football club from the city of Varnsdorf (German: Warnsdorf), in what is today the Czech Republic.

== History ==
Warnsdorfer FK was founded on 10 January 1931 in Czechoslovakia, following the merging of DFC Warnsdorf (founded on 13 April 1907) and SK Germania Warnsdorf (founded on 27 April 1912 as SK Edelgrund Warnsdorf before renaming in 1919). In the following period, the new club succeeded in breaking the dominance of Jablonec and Liberec clubs in northern region of the German Football Association. However, the Sudetenland continued to be dominated more or less by professional clubs DFC Prag, Teplitzer FK, and DSV Saaz. The rise of Warnsdorf in 1939 was thanks to the annexation of the Sudetenland by Nazi Germany and the subsequent official abolition of professional football.

That was the opportunity for Warnsdorfer FK, who had a financially strong sponsor in the stocking manufacturer Kunert. Warnsdorf brought players from dissolved or "deprofessionalised" teams, such as the two-time Czechoslovakia international Vilhelm Náhlovský from Teplitzer FK. The success was immediate: in the 1938–39 season, Warnsdorf won the Gauliga Sudetenland with a 4–0 final win against Teplitzer FK and thus qualified for 1939 German football championship. However, Warnsdorf finished last in their group with no points after losing all four matches against Dresdner SC and Schweinfurt 05.

However, the rise of Warnsdorf was already over. In 1940, the club did not return to the Gauliga Sudetenland and instead was absorbed by the new NSTG (National Socialist Gymnastics Community), and therefore could no longer build on previous successes. With the end of World War II, the club ceased to exist.

Warnsdorfer FK's home stadium, the Platz am Hauptbahnhof, no longer exists and was replaced by a textile manufacturing facility.

== Honours ==
- Gauliga Sudetenland champions: 1938–39
- German football championship participants: 1939
