= Richard Oehm =

German footballer (1909–1975)

Personal information
- Date of birth: 22 June 1909
- Date of death: 20 May 1975 (aged 65)
- Position: Defender

Senior career*
Years	Team	Apps	(Gls)
- 1. FC Nürnberg

International career
1932–1934	Germany	3	(0)
- * Club domestic league appearances and goals

Richard Oehm (22 June 1909 – 20 May 1975) was a German international footballer.
