= Willi Billmann =

German footballer

Personal information
- Date of birth: 15 January 1911
- Place of birth: Nuremberg, Germany
- Date of death: 5 July 2001 (aged 90)
- Place of death: Nuremberg, Germany
- Position: Defender

Youth career
- 1923–1929: TV Leonhard-Schweinau

Senior career*
Years	Team	Apps	(Gls)
1929–1940	1. FC Nürnberg		
1944	Hertha BSC		
1945–1949	1. FC Nürnberg		

International career
1937–1941	Germany	11	(0)
- * Club domestic league appearances and goals

Willi Billmann (15 January 1911 – 5 July 2001) was a German international footballer.

== International career ==
He won 11 caps between 1937 and 1941 for the Germany national team.
