= 1937 Tschammerpokal =

Tournament details
- Country: Germany
- Teams: 61

Final positions
- Champions: FC Schalke 04 (1st title)
- Runners-up: Fortuna Düsseldorf

Tournament statistics
- Matches played: 62

The 1937 Tschammerpokal was the 3rd season of the annual German football cup competition. In the final which was held on 9 January 1938 in the Müngersdorfer Stadion (Cologne) Schalke 04 defeated Fortuna Düsseldorf, 2–1. It was Schalke's third consecutive appearance in the final and their first victory in the cup.

== Matches ==
=== First round ===
22 August 1937
Wacker 04 Tegel Berlin	6 – 0	SV Hindenburg Allenstein
29 August 1937
VfB Sömmerda	0 – 4	Eintracht Braunschweig
TuRa Bonn	4 – 2	SV 06 Kassel-Rothenditmold
FC St. Pauli	0 – 1	Rot-Weiß Oberhausen
Kickers Frankenthal	1 – 3	FC Schalke 04
Schwarz-Weiß Wuppertal	5 – 1	SV Dessau 05
VfB Friedberg	0 – 2	SV Waldhof Mannheim
VfR Mannheim	4 – 1	Kickers Offenbach
SV Ratibor 03	2 – 3	PSV Chemnitz
WKG BSG Neumeyer Nürnberg	0 – 1	VfB Stuttgart	(AET)
SC Planitz	3 – 1	Beuthener SuSV 09
TuRU Düsseldorf	4 – 7	Hannover 96
Minerva 93 Berlin	0 – 0	SC Victoria Hamburg	(AET)
Schlesien Haynau	0 – 10	BC Hartha
1. SSV Ulm 1928	4 – 1	1. FC Nürnberg
PSV Lübeck	0 – 1	Berliner SV 92
Germania Bochum	6 – 5	VfR Köln
FV Zuffenhausen	0 – 3	SpVgg Fürth
RSV Harburg	2 – 5	Werder Bremen
Borussia Dortmund	3 – 1	Hamburger SV
Alemannia Plaidt	1 – 3	Duisburger FV 08
VfB Mühlburg	2 – 1	FSV Frankfurt
Dunlop SV Hanau	0 – 2	Eimsbütteler TV
SpVgg Sülz	2 – 0	Eintracht Frankfurt
Tennis Borussia Berlin	3 – 1	SC Sperber Hamburg
SC Bajuwaren München	1 – 4	Karlsruher FV
Homberger SV 03	0 – 1	Holstein Kiel
BuEV Danzig	2 – 3	Hertha BSC	(AET)
FV 1906 Breslau		bye
Dresdner SC		bye
Fortuna Düsseldorf		bye
5 September 1937
Freiburger FC	1 – 3	Wormatia Worms

==== Replay ====
5 September 1937
SC Victoria Hamburg	2 – 0	Minerva 93 Berlin

=== Second round ===
19 September 1937
Eintracht Braunschweig	2 – 0	TuRa Bonn
FC Schalke 04	2 – 1	Rot-Weiß Oberhausen
SV Waldhof Mannheim	3 – 0	Schwarz-Weiß Barmen
PSV Chemnitz	5 – 2	VfR Mannheim
VfB Stuttgart	2 – 0	SC Planitz
BC Hartha	2 – 1	Wacker 04 Tegel Berlin
Wormatia Worms	4 – 1	1. SSV Ulm 1928
Berliner SV 92	3 – 0	Germania Bochum
SpVgg Fürth	7 – 1	FV 1906 Breslau
Werder Bremen	3 – 4	Borussia Dortmund	(AET)
Duisburger FV 08	1 – 0	VfB Mühlburg
Eimsbütteler TV	2 – 0	SpVgg Sülz
Tennis Borussia Berlin	3 – 4	Dresdner SC	(AET)
Karlsruher FV	0 – 2	Fortuna Düsseldorf
Holstein Kiel	5 – 3	Hertha BSC
17 October 1937
Hannover 96	3 – 2	SC Victoria Hamburg

=== Round of 16 ===
31 October 1937
Eintracht Braunschweig	0 – 1	FC Schalke 04	(AET)
SV Waldhof Mannheim	2 – 0	PSV Chemnitz
VfB Stuttgart	2 – 1	Hannover 96
BC Hartha	4 – 2	VfR Wormatia Worms
Berliner SV 92	1 – 0	SpVgg Fürth
Borussia Dortmund	1 – 1	Duisburger FV 08	(AET)
Dresdner SC	3 – 0	Eimsbütteler TV
Fortuna Düsseldorf	2 – 1	Holstein Kiel

==== Replay ====
7 November 1937
Duisburger FV 08	1 – 3	Borussia Dortmund

=== Quarter-finals ===
14 November 1937
FC Schalke 04	3 – 1	Berliner SV 92
SV Waldhof Mannheim	4 – 3	Borussia Dortmund
Dresdner SC	3 – 1	VfB Stuttgart
Fortuna Düsseldorf	4 – 1	BC Hartha

=== Semi-finals ===
5 December 1937
FC Schalke 04	2 – 1	SV Waldhof Mannheim
Fortuna Düsseldorf	5 – 2	Dresdner SC

=== Final ===
9 January 1938

Schalke 04	2–1	Fortuna Düsseldorf
Kalwitzki 46'; Szepan 47'	Report	Janes 84' (pen.)

Müngersdorfer Stadion, Cologne
Attendance: 72,000
Referee: Hans Grabler (Regensburg)
