= 1939 German football championship =

1939 German championship
Deutsche Fußballmeisterschaft
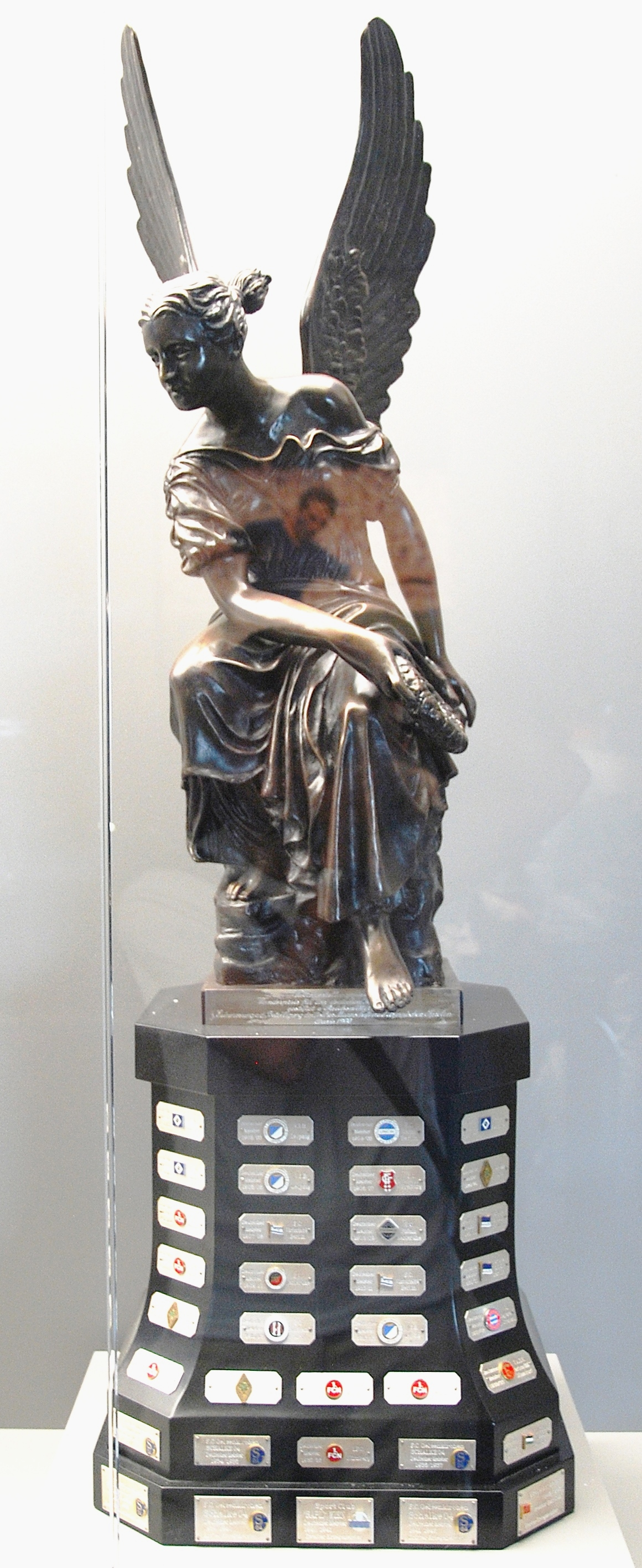
- Replica of the Viktoria trophy

Tournament details
- Country: Germany
- Dates: 2 April – 18 June
- Teams: 18

Final positions
- Champions: Schalke 04; 4th German title
- Runners-up: Admira Wien
- Third place: Dresdner SC
- Fourth place: Hamburger SV

Tournament statistics
- Matches played: 55
- Goals scored: 224 (4.07 per match)
- Top goal scorer: Ernst Kalwitzki (11 goals)

The 1939 German football championship, the 32nd edition of the competition, was won by Schalke 04, the club's fourth German championship by defeating Admira Wien 9–0 in the final, with Ernst Kalwitzki scoring five goals. For Admira it was the club's only appearance in the German championship while the 9–0 result was the highest winning margin for any of the finals held between 1903 and 1963, surpassing VfB Leipzig's 7–2 victory over DFC Prag in the inaugural 1903 final. For Schalke, it continued the club's most successful era, having won the 1934, 1935 and 1937 final and going on to win the 1940 and 1942 ones as well.

Schalke's Ernst Kalwitzki was the 1939 championships top scorer with eleven goals, having previously finished as the top scorer in 1937.

The eighteen 1938–39 Gauliga champions, two more than in 1938 because of the addition of the Gauliga Ostmark after the Anschluss and the Gauliga Sudetenland after the Munich Agreement, competed in a group stage with the four group winners advancing to the semi-finals. The two semi-final winners then contested the 1939 championship final. The groups were divided into three with four clubs and one with six clubs with the latter, in turn, subdivided into two groups of three teams each and a final of these group winners to determine the over all group champions.

While, in the following season, the German championship was still played with eighteen clubs as well but it gradually expanded through a combination of territorial expansion of Nazi Germany and the sub-dividing of the Gauligas in later years, reaching a strength of thirty-one in its last completed season, 1943–44.

== Qualified teams ==
The teams qualified through the 1938–39 Gauliga season:

Club	Qualified from
VfR Mannheim	Gauliga Baden
FC Schweinfurt 05	Gauliga Bayern
Blau-Weiß 90 Berlin	Gauliga Berlin-Brandenburg
CSC 03 Kassel	Gauliga Hessen
SV Dessau 05	Gauliga Mitte
SpVgg Sülz 07	Gauliga Mittelrhein
Fortuna Düsseldorf	Gauliga Niederrhein
VfL Osnabrück	Gauliga Niedersachsen
Hamburger SV	Gauliga Nordmark
Admira Wien	Gauliga Ostmark
Hindenburg Allenstein	Gauliga Ostpreußen
Viktoria Stolp	Gauliga Pommern
Dresdner SC	Gauliga Sachsen
Vorwärts-Rasensport Gleiwitz	Gauliga Schlesien
Warnsdorfer FK	Gauliga Sudetenland
Wormatia Worms	Gauliga Südwest
Schalke 04	Gauliga Westfalen
Stuttgarter Kickers	Gauliga Württemberg

== Competition ==
=== Group 1 ===
Group 1 was contested by the champions of the Gauligas Brandenburg, Niedersachsen, Nordmark and Ostpreußen:

Pos	Team	Pld	W	D	L	GF	GA	GR	Pts	Qualification	HSV	OSN	HIA	BWB
1	Hamburger SV	6	4	1	1	22	11	2.000	9	Advance to semi-finals	—	5–1	5–2	3–0
2	VfL Osnabrück	6	2	2	2	10	12	0.833	6		4–2	—	0–0	1–1
3	Hindenburg Allenstein	6	2	1	3	10	12	0.833	5		1–4	3–1	—	1–2
4	Blau-Weiß 90 Berlin	6	1	2	3	7	14	0.500	4		3–3	1–3	0–3	—

Source: RSSSF
Rules for classification: 1) Points; 2) Goal ratio.

=== Group 2 ===
==== Group 2A ====
Group 2A was contested by the champions of the Gauligas Mittelrhein, Niederrhein and Pommern:

Pos	Team	Pld	W	D	L	GF	GA	GR	Pts	Qualification	F95	S07	STO
1	Fortuna Düsseldorf	4	3	0	1	7	4	1.750	6	Advance to group final	—	3–2	1–0
2	SpVgg Sülz	4	2	0	2	10	6	1.667	4		1–3	—	5–0
3	Viktoria Stolp	4	1	0	3	1	8	0.125	2		1–0	0–2	—

Source: RSSSF
Rules for classification: 1) Points; 2) Goal ratio.

==== Group 2B ====
Group 2B was contested by the champions of the Gauligas Bayern, Sachsen and Sudetenland:

Pos	Team	Pld	W	D	L	GF	GA	GR	Pts	Qualification	DRE	S05	WFK
1	Dresdner SC	4	3	0	1	9	3	3.000	6	Advance to group final	—	1–0	3–1
2	Schweinfurt 05	4	3	0	1	9	4	2.250	6		1–0	—	4–2
3	Warnsdorfer FK	4	0	0	4	5	16	0.313	0		1–5	1–4	—

Source: RSSSF
Rules for classification: 1) Points; 2) Goal ratio.

==== Group 2 final ====
Team 1	Agg.	Team 2	1st leg	2nd leg
Dresdner SC	7–4	Fortuna Düsseldorf	4–1	3–3

=== Group 3 ===
Group 3 was contested by the champions of the Gauligas Baden, Mitte, Ostmark and Württemberg:

Pos	Team	Pld	W	D	L	GF	GA	GR	Pts	Qualification	AWI	SKI	MAN	SVD
1	Admira Wien	6	3	1	2	20	11	1.818	7	Advance to semi-finals	—	6–2	8–3	5–1
2	Stuttgarter Kickers	6	3	1	2	13	13	1.000	7		1–1	—	3–2	3–2
3	VfR Mannheim	6	2	1	3	12	16	0.750	5		3–0	1–4	—	0–0
4	SV Dessau 05	6	2	1	3	6	11	0.545	5		1–0	1–0	1–3	—

Source: RSSSF
Rules for classification: 1) Points; 2) Goal ratio.

=== Group 4 ===
Group 4 was contested by the champions of the Gauligas Hessen, Schlesien, Südwest and Westfalen:

Pos	Team	Pld	W	D	L	GF	GA	GR	Pts	Qualification	S04	VRG	W08	CSC
1	Schalke 04	6	5	0	1	17	5	3.400	10	Advance to semi-finals	—	4–0	1–2	6–1
2	Vorwärts-Rasensport Gleiwitz	6	4	0	2	12	11	1.091	8		1–2	—	5–3	2–0
3	Wormatia Worms	6	3	0	3	12	10	1.200	6		0–1	1–2	—	3–1
4	CSC Kassel	6	0	0	6	4	19	0.211	0		1–3	1–2	0–3	—

Source: RSSSF
Rules for classification: 1) Points; 2) Goal ratio.

=== Semi-finals ===
Two of the four clubs in the 1939 semi-finals had reached the same stage in the previous season, Hamburger SV and FC Schalke 04, while Admira Wien and Dresdner SC replaced Fortuna Düsseldorf and previous season's champions Hannover 96 in comparison to 1938:

Team 1	Score	Team 2
4 June 1939
Schalke 04	3–3 aet	Dresdner SC
Admira Wien	4–1	Hamburger SV

==== Replay ====
Team 1	Score	Team 2
11 June 1939
Schalke 04	2–0	Dresdner SC

=== Third place play-off ===
Team 1	Score	Team 2
17 June 1939
Dresdner SC	3–2	Hamburger SV

=== Final ===
Team 1	Score	Team 2
18 June 1939
Schalke 04	9–0	Admira Wien
