= Gauliga Sudetenland =

- Founded: 1938
- Folded: 1945
- Replaced by: Czechoslovak First League
- Country: Nazi Germany
- Gau (from 1938): Reichsgau Sudetenland
- Level on pyramid: Level 1
- Domestic cup: Tschammerpokal
- Last champions: NSTG Brüx (1943–44)

The Gauliga Sudetenland, was the highest football league in the Sudetenland, the predominantly German-speaking parts of Czechoslovakia that were awarded to the German Reich on 30 September 1938 through the Munich Agreement. Shortly after the completion of the occupation on 10 October 1938, the Nazis reorganised the administration in the region, forming the Reichsgau Sudetenland.

== Overview ==
After the German occupation, a Gauliga Sudetenland championship was organized by the Nazi Sports Office in 1938–39 in the form of a knock-out competition involving the four regional champions, the Bezirksmeister. The winner of this competition qualified for the German championship.

Throughout the league's existence, only ethnically German clubs were permitted to take part in the Gauliga. Except for the 1938-39 edition, when clubs still operated under their original names, almost all teams had to adopt the prefix NTSG standing for Nationalsozialistische Turnergemeinde and were under direct Nazi control. The only clubs outside this system were the military clubs.

The partition of Czechoslovakia from 1938 through 1939

In March 1939, Nazi Germany went to occupy the remaining part of Czechoslovakia. It formed the German controlled Protectorate of Bohemia and Moravia and the nominally independent country of Slovakia. Ethnically German clubs from the newly occupied region took part in the Gauliga Sudetenland, especially from Prague.

The league proper started in 1939, with eleven teams in two groups. The two group champions played a one-off final to determine the Sudetenland champion. The season after the league was reduced to seven teams in an otherwise unchanged setup. The season was greatly shortened due to a number of clubs dropping out throughout it.

The 1941–42 season saw a return to a more organised league system with eighteen clubs in three equal divisions. The three divisional champions then played a home-and-away finals round to determine the Sudetenland champion. The following season, the league was again reduced in numbers throughout the season, finishing with fifteen clubs in the same three groups, four in the eastern group, five in the central and six in the western group. Again, a finals tournament for the group champions was played. From 1943, clubs from the Protectorate left to take part in the new Gauliga Böhmen und Mähren.

In its last completed season, the league operated with thirteen clubs in two divisions, with a home-and-away final of the two divisional champions at the end. Not every club however completed their full program of matches.

The imminent collapse of Nazi Germany in 1945 affected all Gauligas and its doubtful whether the 1944–45 season in the Gauliga Sudetenland got under way at all.

== Members of the league ==
=== Founding members ===
The league was formed of twelve clubs in two divisions in 1939:

Group I:

- NTSG Graslitz
- NSTG Teplitz-Schönau
- NSTG Eger
- NSTG Brüx
- NSTG Karlsbad
- NSTG Komotau

Group II:

- NSTG Gablonz
- NSTG Böhmisch Leipa
- NSTG Aussig
- NSTG Prosetitz
- NSTG Warnsdorf
- NSTG Reichenberg (withdrew during the season)

The abbreviation NSTG stands for Nationalsozialistische Turngemeinde.

=== Non-founding members ===
- NSTG Asch, played part of one season (1940–41)

== Winners and runners-up of the league ==
The winners and runners-up of the league:

Season	Winner	Runner-Up
1938-39	Warnsdorfer FK	Teplitzer FK
1939-40	NSTG Graslitz	NSTG Gablonz
1940-41	NSTG Prag	Luftwaffen SV Pilsen
1941-42	Luftwaffen SV Olmütz	NSTG Prag
1942-43	Militär SV Brünn	NSTG Budweis
1943-44	NSTG Brüx	NSTG Prosetitz

== Aftermath ==
At the end of the Second World War, the German population of the Sudetenland was almost completely expelled. Only a small minority remains in what is now the Czech Republic.

All German football clubs were dissolved and the Czechoslovak First League once more became the highest level of play for the whole country, but now without any ethnically German clubs, the last of which had been relegated in 1936 from the top division.
