= Georg Köhl =

German footballer

Personal information
- Date of birth: 19 November 1910
- Place of birth: Nuremberg, Germany
- Date of death: 15 January 1944 (aged 33)
- Place of death: Kraków, Poland
- Position: Goalkeeper

Senior career*
Years	Team	Apps	(Gls)
- 1. FC Nürnberg

International career
1937	Germany	1	(0)
- * Club domestic league appearances and goals

Georg Köhl (19 November 1910 – 15 January 1944) was a German footballer who played as a goalkeeper for 1. FC Nürnberg and the Germany national team.

In 1939 he was drafted into the Wehrmacht to serve in the Second World War, seeing active service on the Eastern Front in Russia. He died in January 1944 in hospital in Kraków, Poland, from wounds received in action, having refused an amputation of his arm.
