= Gauliga Ostmark =

Gauliga Ostmark Gauliga Donau-Alpenland
- Founded: 1938
- Folded: 1945
- Replaced by: Austrian league; Yugoslav First League
- Country: Nazi Germany
- Gau (from 1938): Reichsgau Carinthia; Reichsgau Niederdonau; Reichsgau Oberdonau; Reichsgau Salzburg; Reichsgau Styria; Reichsgau Tirol-Vorarlberg; Reichsgau Vienna
- Level on pyramid: Level 1
- Domestic cup: Tschammerpokal
- Last champions: First Vienna (1943–44)

The Gauliga Ostmark, renamed Gauliga Donau-Alpenland in 1941, was the highest football league in Austria after its annexation by Germany in 1938. Shortly after the occupation, the Nazis reorganised the administrative regions in Austria, and the seven Gaue Carinthia, Niederdonau, Oberdonau, Salzburg, Styria, Vienna and Tyrol-Vorarlberg replaced the country of Austria. From 1941, the northernmost region of the Kingdom of Yugoslavia, Drava Banovina, became part of the Gaue Carinthia and Styria.

== Overview ==
The Gauliga Ostmark was introduced by the Nazi Sports Office in 1938, after Austria's annexation, to replace the previously existing national league (German:Nationalliga) in the occupied country. The former country of Austria was renamed Ostmark (English:Eastern March) and became part of Germany until 1945. The renaming of Austria to Ostmark was carried out to eradicate all recognition of the country's former independence from Germany. To take matters further, the FK Austria Wien was also renamed in April 1938, to SC Ostmark Wien. This step however was revoked two months later and the club remained one of the few, if not only, institutions to be permitted to carry the former country's name.

Unlike the professional Austrian Nationalliga, the new Gauliga was supposed to be strictly an amateur league.

The new league consisted of six clubs from the old Austrian first division, all based in Vienna and the champion of the second-tier Vienna league (German:Wiener Liga). Additionally, the three champions of the regional leagues of Niederdonau, Oberdonau and Styria were also admitted to the new Gauliga. As such, it was only the second time in the history of Austrian football for regional clubs to take part in the premier competition of the country. Previously, this level had only been open to clubs from Vienna but, in 1937, a national league had been formed with non-Vienna clubs in it for the first time.

In its first season, the league had ten clubs, playing each other once at home and once away. The league winner qualified for the German championship while the bottom three teams were relegated. The league was reduced to eight teams for the 1939–40 season, with the bottom club being relegated.

In 1940–41, the Gauliga Ostmark returned to a strength of ten clubs. After the German occupation of Yugoslavia in April 1941, parts of what is now the country of Slovenia were added to the two southernmost Gaue in the Ostmark. Additionally, the league was renamed Gauliga Donau-Alpenland. However, no clubs from the annexed part of Yugoslavia did take part in the league.

The league was reduced to nine clubs during the 1941–42 season due to the withdrawal of Sturm Graz. The season after, it played with eleven teams. In 1943–44, it again played with nine teams only.

The imminent collapse of Nazi Germany in 1945 gravely affected the Gauligas and the league's last season 1944–45, played with ten teams, was not completed. After nine of eighteen rounds, the competition was halted on 11 March 1945.

== National success ==
The clubs from former Austria had considerable success on national German level, with Rapid Wien in 1941 becoming the only club from outside of the current borders of the Federal Republic of Germany to claim the German national title. Additionally, Admira in 1939 and First Vienna in 1942 both lost the national final to FC Schalke 04. Rapids win over Schalke in 1941, in front of 100,000 spectators in Berlin, is still considered one of the most remarkable German finals, as Schalke led 3–0 after 60 minutes to lose 3–4 after full-time.

Das große Spiel (The big game), a movie about a fictitious German football team, Gloria 03, directed by Robert Stemmle and released in 1942 uses footage of the 1941 German championship final Rapid Wien versus FC Schalke 04.

In the cup competition, Rapid again took out one title, in 1938 while First Vienna won the last competition before the end of Nazi Germany, winning in 1943.

== Founding members of the league ==
Ten clubs from five different leagues formed the Gauliga Ostmark in 1938, with their league position in the 1937–38 season:

- SK Admira Wien finished 6th Austrian league
- SC Wacker Wien finished 4th Austrian league
- SK Rapid Wien Austrian champion
- Wiener SC finished 2nd Austrian league
- First Vienna finished 5th Austrian league
- FK Austria Wien finished 3rd Austrian league
- Amateure Fiat Wien champion Wiener Liga (II)
- Grazer SC champion Steiermark 1. Liga (II)
- SK Amateure Steyr champion Bezirksklasse Oberdonau (II)
- Reichsbahn Wacker Wiener Neustadt champion Niederdonau Liga (II)

== Winners and runners-up of the league ==
The winners and runners-up of the league:

Season	Winner	Runner-up
1938–39	SK Admira Wien	SC Wacker Wien
1939–40	SK Rapid Wien	SC Wacker Wien
1940–41	SK Rapid Wien	SC Wacker Wien
1941–42	First Vienna	FC Wien
1942–43	First Vienna	Wiener AC
1943–44	First Vienna	Floridsdorfer AC

== Placings in the Gauliga Ostmark 1938–45 ==
The complete list of clubs in the league:

Club	1939	1940	1941	1942	1943	1944	1945
SK Admira Wien	1	5	5	8	10		6
SC Wacker Wien	2	2	2	6	9	8	2
SK Rapid Wien	3	1	1	3	6	7	1
Wiener SC	4	3	6	7	4	9	7
First Vienna	5	4	3	1	1	1	3
FK Austria Wien	6	6	4	4	5	5	9
Amateure Fiat Wien	7	8					
Grazer SC	8		9				
SK Amateure Steyr	9						
Reichsbahn Wacker Wiener Neustadt	10						
FC Wien		7	7	2	7	4	4
Floridsdorfer AC			8	5	3	2	5
Linzer ASK			10				
Post SV Wien				9			
Wiener AC					2	3	8
Reichsbahn SG Wien					8		
SK Sturm Graz					11		
Luftwaffen SV Markersdorf						6	
SC Rapid Oberlaa AC							10

- The 1944–45 championship was not completed and is not officially recognised by the Austrian Football Association; placings are after nine of eighteen rounds.
- Sturm Graz withdrew during the 1941–42 season.

== Aftermath ==
At the end of the Second World War, Austria was reestablished as an independent country, occupied by the four allied powers. A national football competition was formed again in 1945, the Erste Liga (English:First League) later being renamed Staatsliga and, from 1974, Austrian Bundesliga, kicking off on 1 September 1945. In the early post-war years, clubs from outside of Vienna were again barred from the top division and only in 1948 did the league become truly national, admitting regional clubs again.

The occupied parts of Yugoslavia became part of the new Socialist Federal Republic of Yugoslavia and reverted to Slovenia.
