= Jakob Miltz =

German footballer

Personal information
- Full name: Jakob Miltz
- Date of birth: 23 September 1928
- Place of birth: Koblenz, Germany
- Date of death: 18 February 1984 (aged 55)
- Position: Forward

Senior career*
| Years | Team | Apps | (Gls) |
| 1938–1957 | TuS Neuendorf | | |
| 1957–1958 | Hannover 96 | | |
| 1958–1959 | 1. FC Kaiserslautern | | |
| 1959–1961 | TuS Neuendorf | | |

International career
| 1954–1956 | Germany | 2 | (0) |
- * Club domestic league appearances and goals

Jakob Miltz (23 September 1928 – 18 February 1984) was a German footballer who played for TuS Neuendorf, Hannover 96 and 1. FC Kaiserslautern.
