= Georg Friedel =

German footballer (1913–1987)

Personal information
- Full name: Georg Friedel
- Date of birth: 6 September 1913
- Place of birth: Germany
- Date of death: 1 June 1987 (aged 73)
- Position: Forward

Youth career
- 1926–1931: 1. FC Nürnberg

Senior career*
Years	Team	Apps	(Gls)
1931–1946	1. FC Nürnberg		

International career
1937	Germany	1	(0)
- * Club domestic league appearances and goals

Georg Friedel (6 September 1913 – 1 June 1987) was a German footballer who played for 1. FC Nürnberg. He made his debut for Nürnberg in April 1931, and went on to play 325 games for the club. He was called up to the Germany national team, earning his only cap in a 2–2 draw against Netherlands in January 1937.
