= 1947–48 Oberliga =

Oberliga
- Season: 1947–48
- Champions: Hamburger SV Union Oberschöneweide Borussia Dortmund: 1. FC Kaiserslautern; 1. FC Nürnberg
- Relegated: Hannover 96 Victoria Hamburg Preußen Dellbrück VfR Köln VfL Witten SC Staaken SG Mariendorf BSG Nordstern SpVgg Trossingen SV Laupheim SpVgg Fürth VfL Neckarau Viktoria Aschaffenburg Rot-Weiß Frankfurt FC Wacker München Sportfreunde Stuttgart
- German champions: 1. FC Nürnberg; 7th German title
- Top goalscorer: Ottmar Walter (51 goals)

Map of the Allied occupation zones in Germany

The 1947–48 Oberliga was the third season of the Oberliga, the first tier of the football league system in the three western zones of Allied-occupied Germany. The league operated in six regional divisions, Berlin, North, South, Southwest (north and south) and West. For the Northern division, the Oberliga Nord, and the Western division, the Oberliga West, it was the inaugural season, the leagues having been created in 1948. The champions and runners-up of the US, British and French occupation zones and the champions of Oberliga Berlin entered the 1948 German football championship, the first edition of the German championship after the Second World War, which was won by 1. FC Nürnberg. It was 1. FC Nürnberg's seventh national championship.

In the British occupation zone the best four teams each of the Oberliga Nord and Oberliga West played out a zone championship with the two finalists advancing to the German championship.

In the US occupation zone the champion and runners-up of the Oberliga Süd directly advanced to the German championship.

In the French occupation zone the Oberliga Südwest operated in two regional divisions, north and south, with a championship final at the end of season. At the end of the season the four clubs in the league from the Saar Protectorate left the German league system with the Saar clubs returning three seasons later, in 1951. The Saar clubs entered the new Ehrenliga Saarland, with the exception of 1. FC Saarbrücken who joined the French Ligue 2 instead. Eventually, on 1 January 1957, the Saar Protectorate would officially join West Germany, ending the post-Second World War political separation of the territory from the other parts of Germany.

In the Soviet occupation zone an Eastern zone championship, the 1948 Ostzonenmeisterschaft, was held and won by SG Planitz, but its winner, also invited, was not permitted to travel to the German championship.

In post-Second World War Germany many clubs were forced to change their names or merge. This policy was particularly strongly enforced in the Soviet and French occupation zones but much more relaxed in the British and US one. In most cases, clubs eventually reverted to their original names, especially after the formation of the Federal Republic of Germany in 1949.

== British occupation zone ==
=== Oberliga Nord ===
The 1947–48 season was the inaugural season of the league.

Pos	Team	Pld	W	D	L	GF	GA	GD	Pts	Promotion, qualification or relegation
1	Hamburger SV (Note: Hamburger SV and FC St. Pauli, on equal points, had to play a championship decider which Hamburger SV won 2–1.)	22	17	3	2	66	17	+49	37	Qualification to German championship
2	FC St. Pauli	22	17	3	2	73	20	+53	37	Qualification to German championship
3	TSV Braunschweig	22	12	4	6	50	31	+19	28	Qualification to British occupation zone championship
4	VfL Osnabrück	22	11	4	7	49	36	+13	26	
5	Werder Bremen	22	12	2	8	43	38	+5	26	Qualification to British occupation zone championship
6	Arminia Hannover	22	9	3	10	35	44	−9	21	
7	VfB Lübeck	22	9	2	11	41	53	−12	20	
8	Concordia Hamburg	22	8	3	11	44	46	−2	19	
9	Bremer SV	22	8	1	13	40	46	−6	17	
10	Holstein Kiel (Note: Holstein Kiel was later found guilty of irregularities during the 1947–48 season and expunged from the league the following season but eventually pardoned.)	22	6	2	14	35	65	−30	14	
11	Hannover 96 (R)	22	6	1	15	32	69	−37	13	Relegation to Amateurliga
12	Victoria Hamburg (R)	22	2	2	18	24	67	−43	6	Relegation to Amateurliga

Source: RSSSF.com
Rules for classification: 1) Points;
(R) Relegated

=== Oberliga West ===
The 1947–48 season was the inaugural season of the league.

Pos	Team	Pld	W	D	L	GF	GA	GD	Pts	Promotion, qualification or relegation
1	Borussia Dortmund	24	17	2	5	62	22	+40	36	Qualification to British occupation zone championship
2	Sportfreunde Katernberg	24	15	4	5	47	30	+17	34	Qualification to British occupation zone championship
3	STV Horst-Emscher	24	11	7	6	55	43	+12	29	Qualification to British occupation zone championship
4	Sportfreunde Hamborn	24	11	6	7	40	29	+11	28	Qualification to British occupation zone championship
5	Rot-Weiß Oberhausen	24	12	3	9	43	32	+11	27	
6	FC Schalke 04	24	9	6	9	40	35	+5	24	
7	Fortuna Düsseldorf	24	9	6	9	41	41	0	24	
8	SpVgg Erkenschwick	24	9	3	12	48	48	0	21	
9	Alemannia Aachen	24	8	5	11	29	46	−17	21	
10	TSG Vohwinkel	24	7	5	12	33	48	−15	19	
11	Preußen Dellbrück (R)	24	7	5	12	37	55	−18	19	Relegation to Amateurliga
12	VfR Köln (R)	24	5	7	12	23	43	−20	17	Relegation to Amateurliga
13	VfL Witten (R)	24	4	5	15	30	56	−26	13	Relegation to Amateurliga

Source: RSSSF.com
Rules for classification: 1) Points;
(R) Relegated

=== Championship ===
The British occupation zone championship saw the best four teams in the two Oberligas compete against each other. The two finalists, both from Hamburg, would advance to the German championship. Like in 1947 Hamburger SV won the second and last edition of this competition.

==== Quarter-finals ====
Team 1	Score	Team 2
FC St. Pauli	3–1	STV Horst-Emscher
Sportfreunde Hamborn	0–1	Hamburger SV
Sportfreunde Katernberg	1–2	TSV Braunschweig
SV Werder Bremen	2–3 aet	Borussia Dortmund

==== Semi-finals ====
Team 1	Score	Team 2
Hamburger SV	3–2	TSV Braunschweig
FC St. Pauli	2–2 aet	Borussia Dortmund

Replay

Team 1	Score	Team 2
FC St. Pauli	1–0	Borussia Dortmund

==== Final ====
Team 1	Score	Team 2
Hamburger SV	6–1	FC St. Pauli

== Oberliga Berlin ==
The 1947–48 season saw three new clubs promoted to the league, SG Spandau-Altstadt, Union Oberschöneweide and VfB Pankow.

Pos	Team	Pld	W	D	L	GF	GA	GD	Pts	Promotion, qualification or relegation
1	Union Oberschöneweide	22	16	3	3	68	21	+47	35	Qualification to German championship
2	SG Wilmersdorf	22	15	4	3	57	20	+37	34	
3	SG Charlottenburg	22	12	7	3	63	23	+40	31	
4	Alemannia 90 Berlin	22	13	4	5	65	31	+34	30	
5	SG Reinickendorf-West	22	10	7	5	47	27	+20	27	
6	SG Spandau-Altstadt	22	7	8	7	43	33	+10	22	
7	SC Südring	23	8	6	9	39	47	−8	22	
8	VfB Pankow	22	7	6	9	26	35	−9	20	
9	SG Köpenick	22	6	5	11	36	58	−22	17	
10	SC Staaken (R)	22	4	3	15	25	79	−54	11	Relegation to Amateurliga
11	SG Mariendorf (R)	22	3	3	16	35	69	−34	9	Relegation to Amateurliga
12	BSG Nordstern (R)	22	2	4	16	29	90	−61	8	Relegation to Amateurliga

Source: RSSSF.com
Rules for classification: 1) Points;
(R) Relegated

== Oberliga Südwest ==
=== Northern group ===
The 1947–48 season saw five new clubs promoted to the league, SpVgg Andernach, VfL Neustadt, Saar 05 Saarbrücken, FK Pirmasens and SG Gonsenheim.

Pos	Team	Pld	W	D	L	GF	GA	GD	Pts	Promotion, qualification or relegation
1	1. FC Kaiserslautern	26	23	2	1	151	18	+133	48	Qualification to German championship
2	1. FC Saarbrücken	26	20	3	3	73	22	+51	43	Withdrawn from the Oberliga
3	TuS Neuendorf	26	19	2	5	74	36	+38	40	Qualification to German championship
4	Borussia Neunkirchen	26	18	2	6	109	36	+73	38	Withdrawn from the Oberliga
5	Wormatia Worms	26	14	4	8	80	51	+29	32	
6	VfL Neustadt	26	12	3	11	56	54	+2	27	
7	FK Pirmasens	26	12	2	12	46	67	−21	26	
8	FSV Mainz 05	26	8	9	9	36	49	−13	25	
9	Saar 05 Saarbrücken	26	10	5	11	42	64	−22	25	Withdrawn from the Oberliga
10	Phönix Ludwigshafen	26	8	5	13	32	57	−25	21	
11	SG Gonsenheim	26	3	4	19	31	89	−58	10	
12	SV Röchling Völklingen	26	4	2	20	33	99	−66	10	Withdrawn from the Oberliga
13	FSV Kürenz	26	3	4	19	24	95	−71	10	
14	SpVgg Andernach	26	4	1	21	31	81	−50	9	

Source: RSSSF.com
Rules for classification: 1) Points;

=== Southern group ===
The 1947–48 season saw four new clubs promoted to the league, Eintracht Singen, SpVgg Trossingen, SV Laupheim and Fortuna Freiburg.

Pos	Team	Pld	W	D	L	GF	GA	GD	Pts	Promotion, qualification or relegation
1	Fortuna Rastatt	22	13	7	2	53	19	+34	33	Qualification to French occupation zone championship
2	SpVgg Offenburg	22	15	2	5	47	25	+22	32	Qualification to runners-up play-offs
3	Eintracht Singen	22	12	3	7	44	21	+23	27	
4	VfL Konstanz	22	10	5	7	40	30	+10	25	
5	Fortuna Freiburg	22	9	7	6	39	32	+7	25	
6	VfL Schwenningen	22	11	2	9	41	34	+7	24	
7	SSV Reutlingen	22	9	5	8	38	37	+1	23	
8	SG Friedrichshafen	22	9	3	10	39	37	+2	21	
9	VfL Freiburg	22	8	5	9	30	31	−1	21	
10	SV Biberach	22	6	4	12	32	43	−11	16	
11	SpVgg Trossingen (R)	22	4	2	16	15	46	−31	10	Relegation to Amateurliga
12	SV Laupheim (R)	22	3	1	18	14	77	−63	7	Relegation to Amateurliga

Source: RSSSF.com
Rules for classification: 1) Points;
(R) Relegated

=== Finals ===
The winners of the two regional divisions of the Oberliga Südwest played a final to determine the league champion who was also directly qualified for the German championship:

Team 1	Agg.	Team 2	1st leg	2nd leg
1. FC Kaiserslautern	9–1	Fortuna Rastatt	3–0	6–1

The runners-up of the two divisions determined the club who would face the loser of the championship final for the second place in the German championship:

Team 1	Agg.	Team 2	1st leg	2nd leg
TuS Neuendorf	7–1	SpVgg Offenburg	5–1	2–0

Team 1	Score	Team 2
TuS Neuendorf	3–1	Fortuna Rastatt

== Oberliga Süd ==
The 1947–48 season saw four new clubs promoted to the league, VfB Mühlburg, Rot-Weiß Frankfurt, FC Wacker München and Sportfreunde Stuttgart.

Pos	Team	Pld	W	D	L	GF	GA	GD	Pts	Promotion, qualification or relegation
1	1. FC Nürnberg (C)	38	28	4	6	88	37	+51	60	Qualification to German championship
2	TSV 1860 München	38	23	6	9	77	63	+14	52	Qualification to German championship
3	Stuttgarter Kickers	38	23	4	11	113	58	+55	50	
4	FC Bayern Munich	38	21	8	9	72	38	+34	50	
5	VfB Stuttgart	38	21	3	14	96	60	+36	45	
6	SV Waldhof Mannheim	38	19	7	12	77	59	+18	45	
7	FSV Frankfurt	38	17	9	12	66	50	+16	43	
8	VfR Mannheim	38	17	9	12	66	55	+11	43	
9	Kickers Offenbach	38	15	12	11	75	55	+20	42	
10	Eintracht Frankfurt	38	16	9	13	64	56	+8	41	
11	Schwaben Augsburg	38	15	11	12	66	59	+7	41	
12	TSG Ulm 1846	38	14	10	14	60	60	0	38	
13	FC Schweinfurt 05	38	13	8	17	49	53	−4	34	
14	VfB Mühlburg	38	13	7	18	53	59	−6	33	
15	SpVgg Fürth (R)	38	15	1	22	68	86	−18	31	Relegation to Amateurliga
16	VfL Neckarau (R)	38	11	8	19	48	81	−33	30	Relegation to Amateurliga
17	Viktoria Aschaffenburg (R)	38	8	9	21	46	88	−42	25	Relegation to Amateurliga
18	Rot-Weiß Frankfurt (R)	38	9	4	25	50	99	−49	22	Relegation to Amateurliga
19	FC Wacker München (R)	38	7	7	24	41	89	−48	21	Relegation to Amateurliga
20	Sportfreunde Stuttgart (R)	38	4	6	28	30	100	−70	14	Relegation to Amateurliga

Source: RSSSF.com
Rules for classification: 1) Points;
(C) Champions; (R) Relegated

== German championship ==
The 1948 German football championship was contested by the eight qualified Oberliga teams and won by 1. FC Nürnberg, defeating 1. FC Kaiserslautern in the final. It was played in a knock-out format and consisted of eight clubs. The champion of the Soviet occupation zone was however not permitted to travel to Stuttgart to play 1. FC Nürnberg, with the game awarded to the latter.
