= British occupation zone football championship =

- Allied occupation zones in Germany
- Founded: 1947
- Abolished: 1948
- Region: British occupation zone in Germany
- Number of teams: 8
- Most successful club(s): Hamburger SV (2 titles)

The British occupation zone football championship was an association football competition in the British zone of Allied-occupied Germany after the Second World War. Two editions of the tournament were held, in 1947 and 1948; both were won by Hamburger SV.

Attempts in 1947 to stage a German football championship failed but, in the following season, a championship was staged with the best two clubs from the British zone championship qualified for the tournament.

While the 1947 season saw the best teams of regional leagues qualify for the tournament the following edition saw the top four of each of the new Oberliga Nord and Oberliga West take part, qualified through the 1947–48 Oberliga season.

The competition was held within the British occupation zone which later became part of West Germany, comprising the federal states of Hamburg, Lower Saxony, North Rhine-Westphalia and Schleswig-Holstein. SV Werder Bremen, based in the Bremen, was located in the US occupation zone but played in the football competitions of the British zone.

== Championships ==
=== 1947 ===
The 1947 British occupation zone championship saw the best teams in the regional leagues compete against each other. The two finalists, Borussia Dortmund and Hamburger SV, came from the Westphalia and Hamburg leagues.

==== Quarter-finals ====
Team 1	Score	Team 2
Borussia Dortmund	4–2	SV Werder Bremen
TSV Braunschweig	2–3 (a.e.t.)	Rot-Weiß Oberhausen
VfR Köln	2–1 (a.e.t.)	Holstein Kiel
Hamburger SV	0–0 (a.e.t.)	FC Schalke 04

Replay

Team 1	Score	Team 2
Hamburger SV	2–0	FC Schalke 04

==== Semi-finals ====
Team 1	Score	Team 2
Hamburger SV	3–1	Rot-Weiß Oberhausen
Borussia Dortmund	5–4 (a.e.t.)	VfR Köln

==== Third place play-off ====
Team 1	Score	Team 2
VfR Köln	4–0	Rot-Weiß Oberhausen

==== Final ====
Team 1	Score	Team 2
Hamburger SV	1–0	Borussia Dortmund

=== 1948 ===
The 1948 British occupation zone championship saw the best four teams in the two Oberligas compete against each other. The two finalists, both from Hamburg, would advance to the German championship. Like in 1947 Hamburger SV won the second and last edition of this competition.

==== Quarter-finals ====
Team 1	Score	Team 2
FC St. Pauli	3–1	STV Horst-Emscher
Sportfreunde Hamborn	0–1	Hamburger SV
Sportfreunde Katernberg	1–2	TSV Braunschweig
SV Werder Bremen	2–3 (a.e.t.)	Borussia Dortmund

==== Semi-finals ====
Team 1	Score	Team 2
Hamburger SV	3–2	TSV Braunschweig
FC St. Pauli	2–2 (a.e.t.)	Borussia Dortmund

Replay

Team 1	Score	Team 2
FC St. Pauli	1–0	Borussia Dortmund

==== Final ====
Team 1	Score	Team 2
Hamburger SV	6–1	FC St. Pauli

== German championship ==
A German championship was not held in 1947 but attempts were made to stage one, scheduled to consist of eight teams, three each from the US and British zone and one each from the French and Soviet one. Difficulties with the scheduling resulted in a reduced format of only four teams planned to consist of Hamburger SV playing SG Charlottenburg and 1. FC Nürnberg playing 1. FC Kaiserslautern in the semi-finals on 10 August 1947, with the final planned for 24 August 1947. After the southern clubs declined to participate the competition was cancelled altogether.

The following season the 1948 British zone winner and runners-up, Hamburger SV and FC St. Pauli, qualified for the end-of-season German football championship where Hamburg lost in the quarter-finals to TuS Neuendorf while St. Pauli advanced to the semi-finals where they were knocked out by eventual winners 1. FC Nürnberg.
