= Ernst Poertgen =

German footballer (1912–1986)

Personal information
- Date of birth: 25 January 1912
- Place of birth: Essen, Germany
- Date of death: 30 November 1986 (aged 74)
- Position: Forward

Youth career
- 1925–1930: BV Altenessen

Senior career*
Years	Team	Apps	(Gls)
1930–1933	Schwarz-Weiß Essen		
1933	1. FC Nürnberg		
1934–1938	Schalke 04		
1938–1940	Bonner SC		
1941–1942	Wacker München		
1946–1952	Bonner SC		

International career
1935–1937	Germany	3	(5)
- * Club domestic league appearances and goals

Ernst Poertgen (25 January 1912 – 30 November 1986) was a German footballer who played as a forward for Schwarz-Weiß Essen, 1. FC Nürnberg, Schalke 04, Bonner SC and Wacker München. He also represented the Germany national team, earning three caps between 1935 and 1937 and scoring five goals, including a hat trick in a 7–2 win against Luxembourg in September 1936.
