= VfL 06 Benrath =

German football club

VfL Benrath
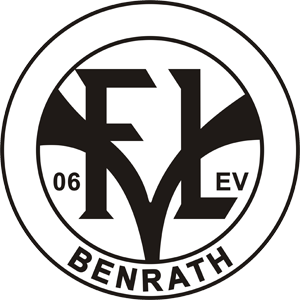
- Full name: Verein für Leibesübungen Benrath 1906 e. V.
- Founded: 1906
- Ground: Münchner Straße
- Capacity: 15,000
- League: Landesliga Niederrhein 1 (VI)
- 2015–16: 14th
Home colours	Away colours

VfL Benrath is a German association football club from the southern city district of Benrath in Düsseldorf, North Rhine-Westphalia.

== History ==
The club was established on 16 April 1906 in what was then the village of Benrath as Benrather Fußball Club. In 1910, they merged with Fußball Club Hohenzollern Benrath-Hassels to become Benrather Fußball Verein. They were joined on 12 July 1919 with the gymnastics association Turnclub Benrath and adopted the name Verein für Leibesübungen Benrath 1906. A 1921 union with another gymnastics club, Turnverein 1881 Benrath led to the formation of Turn- und Sportgemeinde 1881 Benrath. That partnership was short-lived and ended in 1923.

VfL made its first appearance on the national stage in 1930 after a successful season in the regional west German league. They were put out of the national playoffs through a 0–1 loss to Eintracht Frankfurt in the round of 16. A win in the Westdeutscherpokal (West German Cup) propelled the team into the national level playoff once again in 1932, and they again were put out in an eighth final round matchup, this time by Hamburger SV (1–3). Another Westdeutscherpokal win in 1933 was followed by another eighth final exit, 0:2 to SV München 1860.

German football was re-organized in 1933 under the Third Reich into sixteen top-flight regional divisions and VfL became part of the Gauliga Niederrhein. They enjoyed success there early on winning consecutive division titles in 1934 and 1935. Their 1935 playoff run ended with a 2–4 semifinal loss to VfB Stuttgart. After a second-place result the following season the team's performance fell off dramatically and they struggled to remain in the Gauliga. They were relegated in 1939, but returned in the 1941–42 season and remained in first division competition until the end of World War II. Through this period the club made appearances (1935, 1936, 1939) in the early rounds of the Tschammerpokal tournament, predecessor to today's DFB-Pokal (German Cup).

Immediately following the war, Benrath played in the Bezirksliga Berg-Mark and advanced to the regional Niederrhein final where they dropped a 2–0 decision to Rot-Weiß Oberhausen. By 1947, they were part of the Landesliga Niederrhein (III) and in 1949 qualified for the 2nd Oberliga West (II) where they played a single season. They had another single season turn in the second tier in 1954–55 before capturing an Amateurliga Niederrhein (III) title in 1957. They parlayed that division title into a national amateur championship with a 4–2 victory over Alemannia 90 Berlin and returned to the 2. Liga-West for a five-year-long stint. VfL earned lower table finishes there until finally being relegated in 1962 to the Amateurliga Niederrhein (III). After more than a decade of indifferent results, the club slipped out of sight into lower level local competition in 1973.

Nowadays the club plays in the tier eight Kreisliga A Düsseldorf.

== Honours ==
The club's honours:

- Westdeutscher Pokal (West German Cup)
  - Winners: 1932, 1933
- Gauliga Niederrhein (I)
  - Champions: 1934, 1935
- German amateur championship
  - Champions: 1957
- Bezirksliga (Gruppe 1)
  - Champions: 2012
