= Gauliga Westfalen =

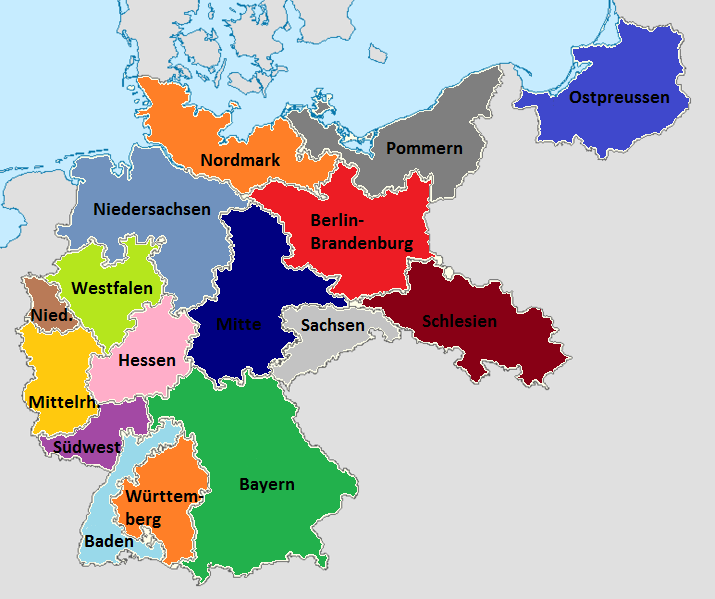
- Founded: 1933
- Folded: 1945 (12 seasons)
- Replaced by: Oberliga West
- Country: Nazi Germany
- Province and States: Province of Westphalia; Free State of Lippe
- Gau (from 1934): Gau Westphalia-North; Gau Westphalia-South
- Level on pyramid: Level 1
- Domestic cup: Tschammerpokal
- Last champions: FC Schalke 04 (1943-44)

The Gauliga Westphalia was the highest football league in the Prussian province of Westphalia and the small Free State of Lippe from 1933 to 1945. Shortly after the formation of the league, the Nazis reorganised the administrative regions in Germany, and the Gaue Westphalia-North and Westphalia-South replaced the Prussian province and the Free State.

== Overview ==
The league was introduced by the Nazi Sports Office in 1933, after the Nazi take over of power in Germany .

The Gauliga Westfalen was established with ten clubs, all from the province of Westphalia.

The Gauliga replaced as such a number of separate leagues covering the areas of Westphalia, South Westphalia and Ruhr, the highest leagues in the region until then.

In its first season, the league had ten clubs, playing each other once at home and once away. The league winner qualified for the German championship while the bottom two teams were relegated. The league remained unchanged until 1940.

Throughout its existence, the league was dominated by what became the golden era of the FC Schalke 04, who won it in every one of its eleven completed seasons. Schalke also took out the national championship in 1934, 1935, 1937, 1939, 1940, 1942, along with being the losing finalist in 1938 and 1941. A cup win in 1937 and four lost finals in 1935, 1936, 1941 and 1942 were also added to this. Despite no other club from the region having any national success, this list means the Gauliga Westfalen was the single most successful league in Germany in this era.

The start to the 1939–40 season was delayed with the outbreak of the Second World War on 1 September 1939 and league football was suspended. It only resumed at the beginning of November, with a number of local cup competitions having been played to bridge the gap. In 1940–41, the league expanded to twelve clubs, with the bottom four teams relegated. The season after, it returned to its original set-up and remained so until 1944.

The imminent collapse of Nazi Germany in 1945 gravely affected all Gauligas and the leagues last season, 1944–45, was meant to be staged in three regional groups with altogether 20 teams. Play never really got under way and no club absolved more than three matches, most none before it had to be suspended.

== Aftermath ==
With the end of the Nazi era, the Gauligas ceased to exist and the region of Westphalia found itself in the British occupation zone. Football in Westphalia restarted in 1946 with the Landesliga Westfalen.

== Founding members of the league ==
The ten founding members and their placings in the 1932–33 season were:

- FC Schalke 04, winner Ruhr division
- SV Höntrop
- SuS Hüsten 09, winner Südwestfalen division
- SV Germania Bochum
- SpVgg 12 Herten
- DSC Hagen
- SV Viktoria Recklingshausen
- Preußen Münster
- Sportfreunde 95 Dortmund
- Arminia Bielefeld, winner Westfalen division

== Winners and runners-up of the league ==
The winners and runners-up of the league:

| Season | Winner | Runner-Up |
|---|---|---|
| 1933-34 | FC Schalke 04 | SV Höntrop |
| 1934-35 | FC Schalke 04 | SV Höntrop |
| 1935-36 | FC Schalke 04 | SV Germania Bochum |
| 1936-37 | FC Schalke 04 | Westfalia Herne |
| 1937-38 | FC Schalke 04 | Borussia Dortmund |
| 1938-39 | FC Schalke 04 | VfL Bochum |
| 1939-40 | FC Schalke 04 | Arminia Bielefeld |
| 1940-41 | FC Schalke 04 | Gelsenguß Gelsenkirchen |
| 1941-42 | FC Schalke 04 | Borussia Dortmund |
| 1942-43 | FC Schalke 04 | VfL Altenbögge |
| 1943-44 | FC Schalke 04 | VfL Altenbögge |

== Placings in the league 1933-44 ==
The complete list of all clubs participating in the league. Note that, in the 1944–45 season, the league was split into three separate groups but the competition was barely started before it came to a halt.

| Club | 1934 | 1935 | 1936 | 1937 | 1938 | 1939 | 1940 | 1941 | 1942 | 1943 | 1944 |
|---|---|---|---|---|---|---|---|---|---|---|---|
| FC Schalke 04 | 1 | 1 | 1 | 1 | 1 | 1 | 1 | 1 | 1 | 1 | 1 |
| SV Höntrop | 2 | 2 | 3 | 7 | 6 | 10 | | | | | |
| SuS Hüsten 09 | 3 | 7 | 4 | 5 | 9 | | | | | | |
| Germania Bochum ^{1} | 4 | 5 | 2 | 8 | 5 | | | | | | |
| SpVgg Herten | 5 | 4 | 6 | 4 | 7 | 9 | | | 9 | | |
| DSC Hagen | 6 | 9 | | | | | | 9 | | | |
| Viktoria Recklinghausen | 7 | 10 | | | | | | | | | |
| Preußen Münster | 8 | 3 | 9 | | | 7 | 7 | 12 | | | |
| Sportfreunde Dortmund | 9 | | | | | | | | | | |
| Arminia Bielefeld ^{3} | 10 | | | | | 6 | 2 | 6 | 6 | 7 | 10 |
| Westfalia Herne | | 6 | 5 | 2 | 3 | 4 | 4 | 5 | 7 | 5 | 5 |
| Union Recklinghausen | | 8 | 10 | | | | | | | | |
| TuS Bochum ^{1} | | | 7 | 10 | | | | | | | |
| SV 08 Buer-Erle | | | 8 | 9 | | | | | | | |
| Borussia Dortmund | | | | 3 | 2 | 3 | 9 | 4 | 2 | 6 | 3 |
| SV Rotthausen | | | | 6 | 10 | | | | | | |
| SpVgg Röhlinghausen | | | | | 5 | 5 | 10 | 7 | 8 | 3 | 7 |
| Arminia Marten | | | | | 8 | 8 | 8 | 10 | | 10 | |
| VfL Bochum ^{1} ^{2} | | | | | | 2 | 3 | 8 | 3 | 4 | 6 |
| VfB Bielefeld ^{3} | | | | | | | 5 | 3 | 10 | | |
| Gelsenguss Gelsenkirchen ^{4} | | | | | | | 6 | 2 | 4 | 8 | 9 |
| Union Gelsenkirchen | | | | | | | | 11 | | | |
| VfB Altenbögge | | | | | | | | | 5 | 2 | 2 |
| STV Horst-Emscher | | | | | | | | | | 9 | |
| SpVgg Erkenschwick | | | | | | | | | | | 4 |

- ^{1} Germania Bochum and TuS Bochum merged in 1938 to form VfL Bochum.
- ^{2} The VfL Bochum and Preussen 07 Bochum formed the KSG Bochum for the 1943–44 season.
- ^{3} The VfB Bielefeld and Arminia Bielefeld formed the KSG Bielefeld for the 1943–44 season.
- ^{4} Gelsenguss Gelsenkirchen became Alemannia Gelsenkirchen in 1942.
