= 1940–41 Gauliga =

Gauliga
- Season: 1940–41
- Champions: 20 regional winners
- German champions: Rapid Wien; 1st German title

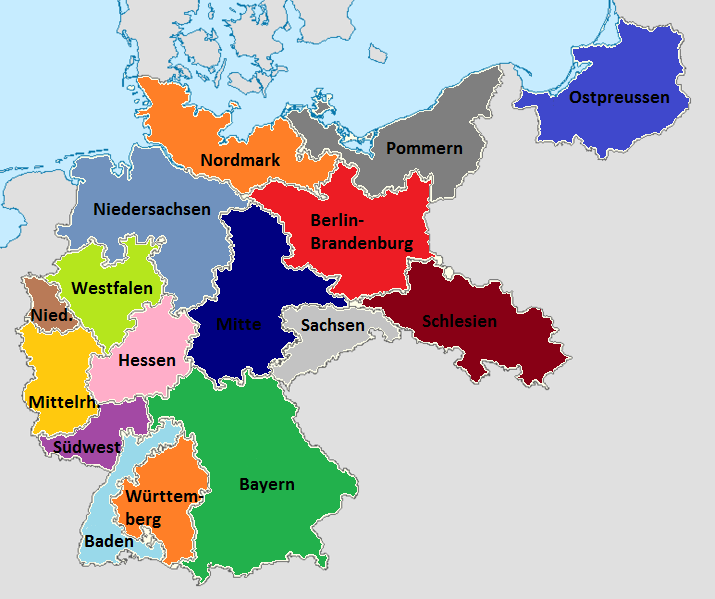
The initial 16 districts of the Gauliga from 1933 to 1938

The 1940–41 Gauliga was the eighth season of the Gauliga, the first tier of the football league system in Germany from 1933 to 1945. It was the second season of the league held during the Second World War.

The league operated in twenty regional divisions, two more than in the previous season, with the league containing 225 clubs all up, nine more than the previous season. The majority of Gauligas returned to their pre-war single-division format, having been split into regional sub-divisions for the first war season. The league champions entered the 1941 German football championship, won by SK Rapid Wien who defeated FC Schalke 04 4–3 in the final. It was Rapid's sole German national championship.

The 1940–41 season saw the seventh edition of the Tschammerpokal, now the DFB-Pokal. The 1941 edition was won by Dresdner SC, defeating FC Schalke 04 2–1 on 2 November 1941, leaving Schalke to have lost both the championship and cup final in 1941.

The number of Gauligas, twenty, increased by two compare to the previous season because of the introduction of the Gauliga Danzig-Westpreußen, named after the city of Gdańsk (German: Danzig) and the former Prussian province of West Prussia and formed by clubs from the Free City of Danzig and Pomeranian Voivodeship, annexed from Poland, and Gauliga Elsaß, formed in the Alsace (German: Elsaß) region which was annexed by Nazi Germany from France.

In the part of Czechoslovakia incorporated into Germany in March 1939, the Protectorate of Bohemia and Moravia, a separate Czech league continued to exist which was not part of the Gauliga system or the German championship.

== Champions ==
Map of Nazi Germany showing its expansion 1938 -1945

The 1940–41 Gauliga champions qualified for the group stage of the German championship. VfL Köln 99, Dresdner SC, FC Schalke 04 and SK Rapid Wien won their championship groups and advanced to the semi-finals with the latter two reaching the championship final which Rapid won.

FC Schalke 04 won their eighth consecutive Gauliga title, Vorwärts-Rasensport Gleiwitz their fourth consecutive title, Stuttgarter Kickers and Dresdner SC their third while SK Rapid Wien, Kickers Offenbach and VfB Königsberg defended their 1939–40 Gauliga title.

Club	League	No. of clubs
VfL Neckarau	Gauliga Baden	10
TSV 1860 München	Gauliga Bayern (1940–41 season)	13
Tennis Borussia Berlin	Gauliga Berlin-Brandenburg	12
Preußen Danzig	Gauliga Danzig-Westpreußen^{‡}	6
FC Mühlhausen 93	Gauliga Elsaß^{‡}	16
Borussia Fulda	Gauliga Hessen	11
SV Jena	Gauliga Mitte	8
VfL 99 Köln	Gauliga Mittelrhein	10
TuS Helene Altenessen	Gauliga Niederrhein	10
Hannover 96	Gauliga Niedersachsen	12
Hamburger SV	Gauliga Nordmark	12
SK Rapid Wien	Gauliga Ostmark (1940–41 season)	10
VfB Königsberg	Gauliga Ostpreußen	8
LSV Stettin	Gauliga Pommern	14
Dresdner SC	Gauliga Sachsen	12
Vorwärts-Rasensport Gleiwitz^{#}	Gauliga Schlesien	11
NSTG Prag	Gauliga Sudetenland	10
Kickers Offenbach	Gauliga Südwest	16
FC Schalke 04	Gauliga Westfalen	12
Stuttgarter Kickers	Gauliga Württemberg	12

- ^{#} Vorwärts-Rasensport Gleiwitz qualified for the finals as they were leading the table when participation in the German championship was determined. The competition was not completed but Germania Königshütte led the table at the time of cancellation for war reasons on 30 March 1941.
- ^{‡} Denotes new Gauligas for the 1940–41 season.
