= 1941 Tschammerpokal =

Tournament details
- Country: Germany
- Teams: 64

Final positions
- Champions: Dresdner SC
- Runners-up: Schalke 04

Tournament statistics
- Matches played: 67

The 1941 Tschammerpokal was the 7th season of the annual German football cup competition. It was divided into four stages with 64 teams competing in the final stage of six rounds. In the final, held November 2nd 1941 in the Olympiastadion, Dresdner SC defeated Schalke 04 2–1.

== Matches ==
=== First round ===
8 July 1941
SK Rapid Wien	4 – 3	FC Wien
10 July 1941
FK Austria Wien	6 – 2	SC Wacker Wien
12 July 1941
Holstein Kiel	2 – 1	Hamburger SV
SV Waldhof Mannheim	2 – 1	SpVgg Sandhofen
SSV Jahn Regensburg	2 – 6	TSV 1860 Munich
TSV Schwaben Augsburg	0 – 7	1. FC Nürnberg
SV Prussia Samland Königsberg	3 – 8	Königsberger STV
VfB Königsberg	concession	Polizei SV Tilsit
SC Preußen Danzig	2 – 4	Viktoria Stolp
MSV Hubertus Kolberg	2 – 3	LSV Kamp-Köslin
LSV Stettin	0 – 6	Tennis Borussia Berlin
Hertha BSC	1 – 2	Blau-Weiß 90 Berlin
Vorwärts-Rasensport Gleiwitz	7 – 2	DTSG Krakau
SpVgg Breslau 02	3 – 2	Germania Königshütte
Dresdner Sportfreunde 01	0 – 2	PSV Chemnitz
LSV Nordhausen	2 – 4	1. SV Jena
Eimsbütteler TV	1 – 2	SV Werder Bremen
Eintracht Braunschweig	1 – 3	Hannover 96
SV Linden 07	6 – 5	Wilhelmsburger FV	(AET)
Rot-Weiß Essen	1 – 2	FC Schalke 04	(AET)
Westende Hamborn	0 – 0	TuS Helene Altenessen	(AET)
TuS Duisburg 48/99	0 – 1	Schwarz-Weiß Essen
SV Victoria 1911 Köln	1 – 0^{1}	Fortuna Köln
Reichsbahn TSV Rot-Weiß Frankfurt	1 – 1^{2}	VfL 99 Köln
SV Kurhessen Kassel	0 – 4	BC Sport Kassel
Borussia Fulda	9 – 6	Offenbacher Kickers
1. FC Rheinfelden	0 – 2	FC Mülhausen
FV Metz	4 – 0	VfL Neckarau
Stuttgarter Kickers	17 – 0	VfB Knielingen
SpVgg Fürth	7 – 0	Stuttgarter SC
NTSG Prag	1 – 2	SK Admira Wien
20 July 1941
LSV Wurzen	1 – 4	Dresdner SC

^{1} The game was aborted after 40 minutes due to a cloudburst.

^{2} The game was aborted after 74 minutes due to an air raid warning.

==== Replays ====
20 July 1941
TuS Helene Altenessen	2 – 4	Westende Hamborn
Reichsbahn TSV Rot-Weiß Frankfurt	3 – 0	VfL 99 Köln
27 July 1941
SV Victoria 1911 Köln	0 – 4	Fortuna Düsseldorf

=== Second round ===
2 August 1941
Tennis Borussia Berlin	2 – 3	Blau-Weiß 90 Berlin
3 August 1941
Königsberger STV	0 – 7	VfB Königsberg
Vorwärts-Rasensport Gleiwitz	6 – 1	Breslauer SpVg 02
PSV Chemnitz	0 – 3	Dresdner SC
Viktoria Stolp	0 – 3	LSV Kamp-Köslin
1. SV Jena	5 – 3	Borussia Fulda
SV Werder Bremen	1 – 2	Holstein Kiel
Hannover 96	5 – 1	SV Linden 07
WKG Westende Hamborn	1 – 2	Schwarz-Weiß Essen
BC Sport Kassel	0 – 3	SV Waldhof Mannheim
FV Metz	0 – 0	Reichsbahn TSV Rot-Weiß Frankfurt	(AET)
FC Mülhausen	0 – 4	Stuttgarter Kickers
TSV 1860 München	2 – 5	FK Austria Wien
SK Rapid Wien	3 – 5	SK Admira Wien
10 August 1941
FC Schalke 04	4 – 2	Fortuna Düsseldorf
1. FC Nürnberg	4 – 1	SpVgg Fürth

==== Replay ====
10 August 1941
Reichsbahn TSV Rot-Weiß Frankfurt	0 – 2	FV Metz

=== Round of 16 ===
24 August 1941
LSV Kamp-Köslin	3 – 2	VfB Königsberg
Holstein Kiel	4 – 0	Blau-Weiß 90 Berlin
FK Austria Wien	8 – 0	Vorwärts-Rasensport Gleiwitz
Dresdner SC	9 – 2	Hannover 96
SV Waldhof Mannheim	0 – 1	SK Admira Wien
Stuttgarter Kickers	4 – 1	1. FC Nürnberg
1. SV Jena	3 – 0	FV Metz
31 August 1941
Schwarz-Weiß Essen	1 – 5	FC Schalke 04

=== Quarter-finals ===
21 September 1941
Holstein Kiel	2 – 1	1. SV Jena
LSV Kamp-Köslin	1 – 4	Dresdner SC
SK Admira Wien	5 – 0	Stuttgarter Kickers
FC Schalke 04	4 – 1	FK Austria Wien

=== Semi-finals ===
12 October 1941
Dresdner SC	4 – 2	SK Admira Wien
FC Schalke 04	6 – 0	Holstein Kiel

=== Final ===
2 November 1941

Dresdner SC	2–1	Schalke 04
Kugler 8'; Carstens 88'	Report	Kuzorra 51'

Olympiastadion, Berlin
Attendance: 65,000
Referee: Helmuth Fink (Frankfurt)
