= 1934 German football championship =

1934 German championship
Deutsche Fußballmeisterschaft
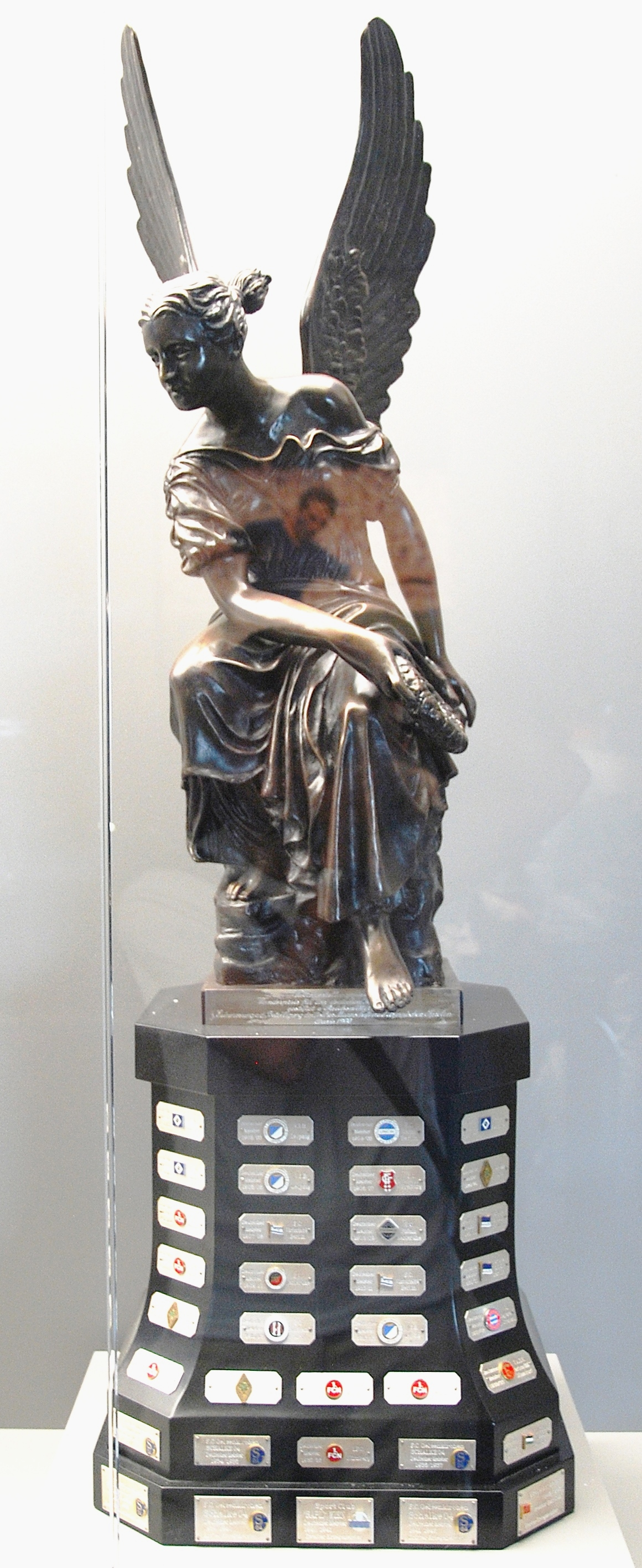
- Replica of the Viktoria trophy

Tournament details
- Country: Germany
- Dates: 8 April – 24 June
- Teams: 16

Final positions
- Champions: Schalke 04; 1st German title
- Runners-up: 1. FC Nürnberg

Tournament statistics
- Matches played: 51
- Goals scored: 219 (4.29 per match)
- Top goal scorer: Otto Siffling (11 goals)

The 1934 German football championship, the 27th edition of the competition, was won by Schalke 04 by defeating 1. FC Nürnberg 2–1 in the final. It was Schalke's first championship, with five more titles to follow until 1942 and a seventh one in 1958. For Nuremberg, with five German championships to its name at the time, it marked the first time it lost a final but the club would go on to win its next title, the 1936 edition, after defeating Schalke in the semi-finals.

Schalke won the 1934 championship final late in the game after Nuremberg had gone 1–0 ahead In the 54th minute. Schalke equalised in the 87th and scored the winning goal three minutes later through Ernst Kuzorra.

Waldhof Mannheim's Otto Siffling became the top scorer of the 1934 championship with eleven goals, the first player to score double-digit figures since interception of the competition in 1903.

Under the new Gauliga system, introduced after the Nazis came to power in 1933, the sixteen 1933–34 Gauliga champions competed in a group stage of four groups of four teams each, with the group winners advancing to the semi-finals. The two semi-final winners then contested the 1934 championship final. While the number of teams in the competition, sixteen, had remained the same as in the previous seasons, the modus had changed compare to 1933, when all games were played in the knock-out format and the competition was shorter.

== Qualified teams ==
The teams qualified through the 1933–34 Gauliga season:

Club	Qualified from
SV Waldhof Mannheim	Gauliga Baden
1. FC Nürnberg	Gauliga Bayern
Viktoria 89 Berlin	Gauliga Berlin-Brandenburg
Borussia Fulda	Gauliga Hessen
Wacker Halle	Gauliga Mitte
Mülheimer SV	Gauliga Mittelrhein
VfL 06 Benrath	Gauliga Niederrhein
SV Werder Bremen	Gauliga Niedersachsen
Eimsbütteler TV	Gauliga Nordmark
Preußen Danzig	Gauliga Ostpreußen
Viktoria Stolp	Gauliga Pommern
Dresdner SC	Gauliga Sachsen
Beuthener SuSV 09	Gauliga Schlesien
Kickers Offenbach	Gauliga Südwest
Schalke 04	Gauliga Westfalen
Union Böckingen	Gauliga Württemberg

== Competition ==
=== Group 1 ===
Group 1 was contested by the champions of the Gauligas Brandenburg, Ostpreußen, Pommern and Schlesien:

Pos	Team	Pld	W	D	L	GF	GA	GR	Pts	Qualification	V89	BEU	STO	DAN
1	Viktoria Berlin	6	6	0	0	24	9	2.667	12	Advance to semi-finals	—	5–2	4–2	5–2
2	Beuthener SuSV	6	3	1	2	12	13	0.923	7		1–4	—	1–1	2–1
3	Viktoria Stolp	6	1	2	3	10	12	0.833	4		2–3	1–2	—	3–1
4	Preußen Danzig	6	0	1	5	6	18	0.333	1		0–3	1–4	1–1	—

Source: RSSSF
Rules for classification: 1) Points; 2) Goal ratio.

=== Group 2 ===
Group 2 was contested by the champions of the Gauligas Nordmark, Niedersachsen, Niederrhein and Westfalen:

Pos	Team	Pld	W	D	L	GF	GA	GR	Pts	Qualification	S04	BEN	SVW	ETV
1	Schalke 04	6	4	0	2	16	7	2.286	8	Advance to semi-finals	—	0–1	3–0	4–1
2	VfL Benrath	6	3	1	2	12	11	1.091	7		0–2	—	4–1	4–1
3	Werder Bremen	6	2	1	3	11	17	0.647	5		2–5	2–2	—	4–2
4	Eimsbütteler TV	6	2	0	4	13	17	0.765	4		3–2	5–1	1–2	—

Source: RSSSF
Rules for classification: 1) Points; 2) Goal ratio.

=== Group 3 ===
Group 3 was contested by the champions of the Gauligas Baden, Mittelrhein, Südwest and Württemberg:

Pos	Team	Pld	W	D	L	GF	GA	GR	Pts	Qualification	WMA	MUS	KOF	BOE
1	Waldhof Mannheim	6	3	3	0	19	6	3.167	9	Advance to semi-finals	—	6–1	0–0	6–0
2	Mülheimer SV	6	2	2	2	13	18	0.722	6		1–1	—	4–4	2–0
3	Kickers Offenbach	6	1	3	2	14	16	0.875	5		2–2	1–3	—	4–1
4	Union Böckingen	6	2	0	4	15	21	0.714	4		2–4	6–2	6–3	—

Source: RSSSF
Rules for classification: 1) Points; 2) Goal ratio.

=== Group 4 ===
Group 4 was contested by the champions of the Gauligas Bayern, Hessen, Mitte and Sachsen:

Pos	Team	Pld	W	D	L	GF	GA	GR	Pts	Qualification	FCN	DRE	FUL	WHA
1	1. FC Nürnberg	6	4	1	1	10	4	2.500	9	Advance to semi-finals	—	1–2	1–1	3–0
2	Dresdner SC	6	4	1	1	16	7	2.286	9		0–1	—	3–1	7–2
3	Borussia Fulda	6	1	2	3	7	10	0.700	4		1–2	0–0	—	3–2
4	Wacker Halle	6	1	0	5	8	20	0.400	2		0–2	2–4	2–1	—

Source: RSSSF
Rules for classification: 1) Points; 2) Goal ratio.

=== Semi-finals ===
Team 1	Score	Team 2
17 June 1934
1. FC Nürnberg	2–1	Viktoria 89 Berlin
Schalke 04	5–2	SV Waldhof Mannheim

=== Final ===
Team 1	Score	Team 2
24 June 1934
Schalke 04	2–1	1. FC Nürnberg
