= 1942 Tschammerpokal =

Tournament details
- Country: Germany
- Teams: 64

Final positions
- Champions: 1860 Munich
- Runners-up: Schalke 04

Tournament statistics
- Matches played: 64

The 1942 Tschammerpokal was the 8th season of the annual German football cup competition. During this competition, 64 teams competed in the final tournament stage of six rounds. At the finals, which were held on 15 November 1942, the Olympiastadion 1860 Munich defeated Schalke 04 2–0.

== Matches ==
=== First round ===
20 July 1942
| Arminia Bielefeld | 4 – 0 | LSV Gütersloh |
| VfB Stuttgart | 6 – 1 | TSG 1861 Ludwigshafen |
| VfB Königsberg | 6 – 0 | MTV Ponarth |
| SV Neufahrwasser | 3 – 2 | LSV Heiligenbeil |
| HuS Marienwerder | 1 – 2 | LSV Stettin |
| Stettiner SC | 1 – 2 | LSV Pütnitz |
| Blau-Weiß 90 Berlin | 3 – 0 | Lufthansa SG Berlin |
| Hallescher FV Sportfreunde | 1 – 2 | SC Minerva 93 Berlin |
| SpVgg Breslau 02 | 12 – 3 | LSV Görlitz |
| LSV Boelcke Krakaus | 2 – 5 | TuS Lipine |
| LSV Reiecke Brieg | 3 – 1 | LSV Olmütz |
| FV Germania Königshütte | 3 – 5 | LSV Adler Deblin |
| NTSG Falkenau | 3 – 1 | Planitzer SC |
| Döbelner SC | 4 – 1 | NSTG Prag |
| SV Dessau 05 | 2 – 0 | Eintracht Braunschweig |
| SV Werder Bremen | 5 – 1 | SC Victoria Hamburg |
| Hamburger SV | 6 – 0 | Eimsbütteler TV |
| Hannover 96 | 3 – 3 | SV Fortuna Leipzig | (AET) |
| Reichsbahn SG Borussia Fulda | 1 – 6 | Westende Hamborn |
| SV Schwarz-Weiß 07 Esch | 2 – 5 | FV Stadt Düdelingen |
| SV Victoria 11 Köln | 2 – 3 | SpVgg 07 Sülz |
| Hamborn 07 | 0 – 2 | FC Schalke 04 |
| FC Hanau 93 | 2 – 1 | 1. FC Schweinfurt 05 |
| SV Waldhof Mannheim | 3 – 1 | VfR Mannheim |
| 1. FC Kaiserslautern | 2 – 3 | Kickers Offenbach |
| Borussia Neunkirchen | 4 – 5 | SG SS Straßburg |
| Rot-Weiß Essen | 2 – 5 | VfL 99 Köln |
| FC Mülhausen 93 | 2 – 1 | RSC Straßburg |
| SG Böblingen | 2 – 3 | Stuttgarter Kickers |
| Eintracht Frankfurt | 4 – 1 | SpVgg Fürth |
| TSV 1860 München | 5 – 3 | SK Rapid Wien |
| Wiener AC | 1 – 2 | First Vienna FC |

==== Replay ====
| Hannover 96 | 2 – 4 | SV Fortuna Leipzig |

=== Second round ===
9 August 1942
| Westende Hamborn | 1 – 0 | Arminia Bielefeld |
| FC Mülhausen 93 | 0 – 2 | VfB Stuttgart |
| SV Dessau 05 | 5 – 3 | Döbelner SC |
| LSV Stettin | 4 – 1 | VfB Königsberg |
| LSV Pütnitz | 3 – 2 | SV Neufahrwasser |
| TuS Lipine | 4 – 0 | SpVgg Breslau 02 |
| LSV Adler Deblin | 7 – 1 | LSV Reinicke Brieg |
| FC Schalke 04 | 6 – 0 | Eintracht Frankfurt |
| VfL 99 Köln | 1 – 2 | SV Werder Bremen |
| Kickers Offenbach | 3 – 1 | FC Hanau 93 |
| SG SS Straßburg | 5 – 4 | SV Waldhof Mannheim | (AET) |
| Stuttgarter Kickers | 1 – 3 | TSV 1860 München |
| FV Stadt Düdelingen | 2 – 0 | SpVgg 07 Sülz |
| NTSG Falkenau | 4 – 0 | First Vienna FC |
| SV Fortuna Leipzig | 0 – 3 | Blau-Weiß 90 Berlin |
| SC Minerva 93 Berlin | 0 – 2 | Hamburger SV |

=== Round of 16 ===
| LSV Stettin | 4 – 1 | LSV Pütnitz |
| TuS Lipine | 4 – 1 | LSV Adler Deblin |
| SV Werder Bremen | 6 – 1 | Kickers Offenbach |
| FC Schalke 04 | 4 – 1 | Westende Hamborn |
| TSV 1860 München | 15 – 1 | SG SS Straßburg |
| VfB Stuttgart | 0 – 2 | FV Stadt Düdelingen |
| Hamburger SV | 3 – 4 | SV Dessau 05 |
| Blau-Weiß 90 Berlin | 4 – 1 | NTSG Falkenau |

=== Quarter-finals ===
| SV Dessau 05 | 0 – 4 | FC Schalke 04 |
| FV Stadt Düdelingen | 0 – 7 | TSV 1860 München |
| TuS Lipine | 4 – 1 | Blau-Weiß 90 Berlin |
| SV Werder Bremen | 4 – 1 | LSV Stettin |

=== Semi-finals ===
| TSV 1860 München | 6 – 0 | TuS Lipine |
| FC Schalke 04 | 2 – 0 | SV Werder Bremen |

=== Final ===
15 November 1942
14:00 CET

| 1860 Munich | 2–0 | Schalke 04 |
|---|---|---|
| Wilimowski 80'; Schmidhuber 88' | Report |

Olympiastadion, Berlin
Attendance: 80,000
Referee: Albert Multer (Landau)
