= SV Hindenburg Allenstein =

German football club

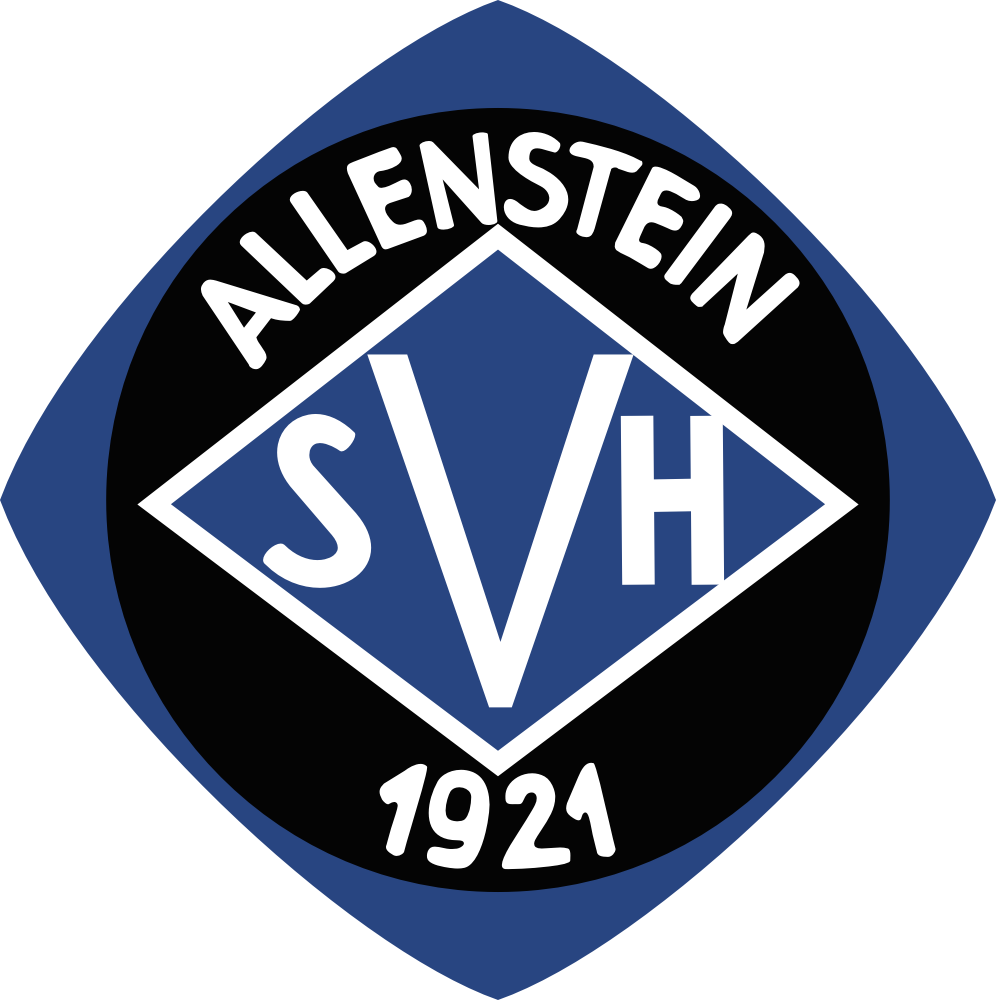
- Full name: Standort-Sportvereinigung Hindenburg Allenstein
- Founded: 1921; 105 years ago
- Dissolved: 1945; 81 years ago
- Ground: Reiterkaserne
- League: Baltenverband
- –: defunct
Home colours	Away colours

SV Hindenburg Allenstein was a German football club from the city of Allenstein, East Prussia (present-day Olsztyn, Poland).

The club was formed in 1921 as Sportvereinigung Hindenburg Allenstein and was named for German field marshal and Reichs President Paul von Hindenburg. Sometime in 1935 it became a military side and played as Standort-Sportvereinigung Hindenburg Allenstein. The team first came to notice in 1932 by capturing the Baltenverband title and advancing to the national playoff round where they were put out in an eighth-final match by Eintracht Frankfurt (0:6). They repeated as division champions again the next season and beat Hertha Berlin 4:1 on their way to a re-match with Eintracht in the quarterfinals. Frankfurt again came away victorious this time drubbing Allenstein by a 12:2 score.

In 1933, German football was re-organized under the Third Reich into sixteen top-flight regional divisions and SV joined the Gauliga Ostpreußen. They finished atop their group within the division before going down 2:3 to Preußen Danzig in the division final. Now playing as Standort-Sportvereinigung Hindenburg Allenstein, the team won the Gauliga Allenstein group within the Gauliga Ostpreußen in 1935, and this time emerged as overall division champions by beating SV Prussia-Samland Königsberg (2:0, 7:2). However, they fared poorly in their subsequent national playoff round appearance. SSV repeated their group and division wins in the 1936–37 season and again advanced to the opening round of the national playoffs, this time by defeating Yorck Boyen Insterburg (0:0, 7:0). The team also made appearances in play for the Tschammerspokal, predecessor to the present day DFB-Pokal (German Cup) in three consecutive years from 1936 to 1938.

Allenstein won the Gauliga Ostpreußen outright in 1939 and made one last appearance in the national playoffs before military sides were no longer permitted to take part in general competition. Following the end of World War II in 1945 the club disappeared when the city and parts of East Prussia became part of Poland.

== Honours ==
- Baltic football champions: 1932
- Gauliga Ostpreußen champions: 1936, 1937, 1939
