= SG OrPo Danzig =

German football club

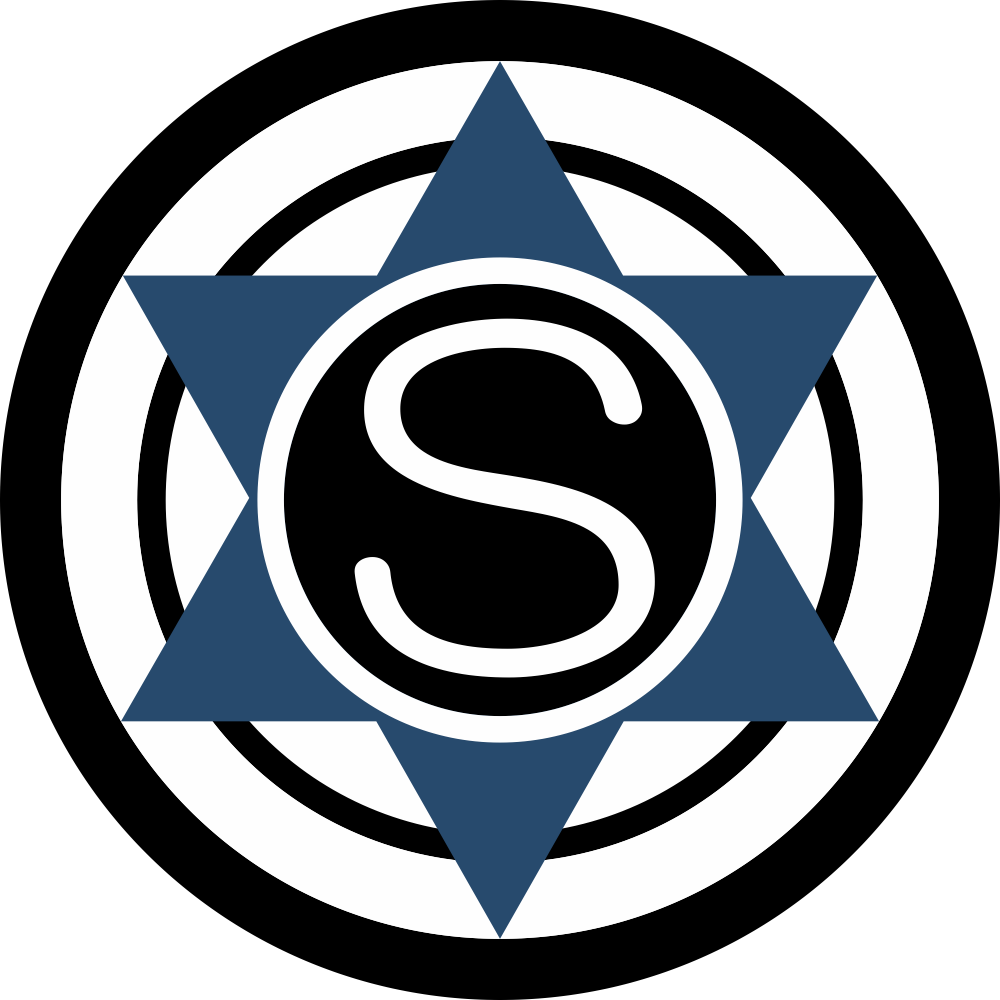
- Full name: Sportgemeinschaft der Ordnungspolizei Danzig
- Founded: 1920; 106 years ago
- Dissolved: 1945; 81 years ago
- Ground: Polizeisportplatz Langfuhr, Winterfeldtweg
Home colours	Away colours

SG OrPo Danzig was a German association football club from the city of Danzig, West Prussia (today Gdańsk, Poland). It was established in 1920 as Sportverein Schutzpolizei Danzig as the sports club of the city's police force. Through the 1920s the club made regular appearances in the playoff rounds of the regional Baltenverband, but did not enjoy any success there. In 1934, SV became part of the Gauliga Ostpreussen and from 1935 to 1938 played within the Gauliga Danzig which was a division of the Ostpreussen league. The team was renamed Polizei SV Danzig in 1939 and took part that year in the opening round of the Tschammerpokal, predecessor to the current-day DFB-Pokal (German Cup), where they were put out 2–3 by Viktoria Stolp. The team was renamed again in 1941, becoming Sportgemeinschaft der Ordnungspolizei Danzig in 1941, and from 1940 to 1943, was part of the Gauliga Danzig-Westpreußen.

The club was forced to withdraw from Gauliga competition partway through the 1942–43 season and disappeared in 1945 with the end of World War II when Danzig became part of Poland.
