= 1933–34 Gauliga =

Gauliga
- Season: 1933–34
- Champions: 16 regional winners
- German champions: Schalke 04; 1st German title

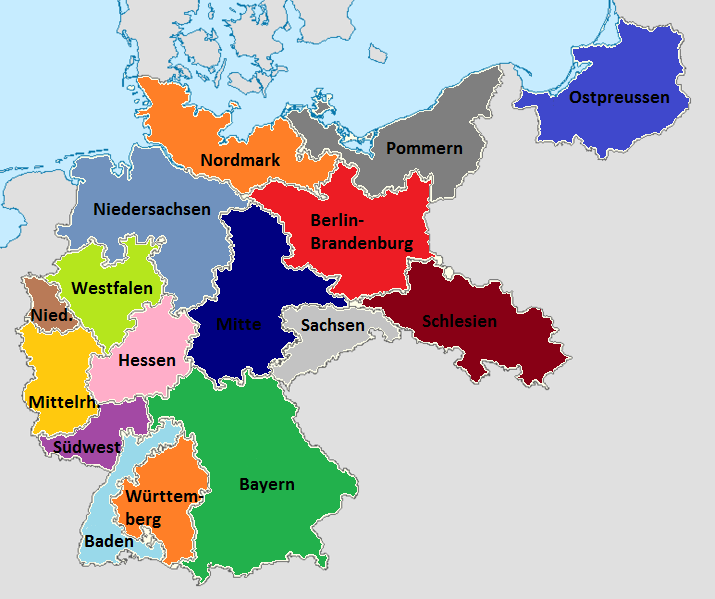
The initial 16 districts of the Gauliga in 1933

The 1933–34 Gauliga was the inaugural season of the Gauliga, the first tier of the football league system in Germany from 1933 to 1945.

The Gauligas replaced the seven regional championships and the numerous local leagues which previously existed in Germany. The Gauligas were established after the rise of the Nazis to power in 1933. In the season previous to the establishment German football had been sub-divided into almost 70 local tier-one leagues with an average number of 10 clubs per league, resulting in close to 700 top level clubs. These leagues had, up till 1933, played out seven regional championships with the top clubs of those advancing to the national German championship.

The league operated in sixteen regional divisions, of which two, the Gauliga Ostpreußen and Gauliga Pommern, were sub-divided into two regional groups again, with the league containing 178 clubs all up. The league champions entered the 1934 German football championship, won by FC Schalke 04 who defeated 1. FC Nürnberg 2–1 in the final. It was Schalke's first-ever national championship and the club would go on to win five more during the Gauliga era of German football from 1933 to 1945.

Viktoria Stolp, champions of the Gauliga Pommern, was the only club to remain unbeaten during the league season, winning all twelve games in the eastern division of the league and going on to win and draw in the two finals against western champions Stettiner SC. At the other end of the table three clubs finished the season with just one win, Viktoria Stralsund, Phönix Köslin and Schweriner FC. Hamburger SV scored the most goals of any Gauliga club with 91 while Schweriner FC conceded the most with 119. 1. FC Nürnberg and Dresdner SC achieved the highest points totals with 34 each while Viktoria Stralsund earned the least with two points to its name.

== Champions ==
The 1933–34 Gauliga champions qualified for the group stage of the German championship. SV Waldhof Mannheim, Viktoria 89 Berlin, 1. FC Nuremberg and FC Schalke 04 won their championship groups and advanced to the semi-finals with the latter two reaching the championship final which Schalke won.

Club	League	No. of clubs
SV Waldhof Mannheim	Gauliga Baden	10
1. FC Nürnberg	Gauliga Bayern (1933–34 season)	12
Viktoria 89 Berlin	Gauliga Berlin-Brandenburg	12
Borussia Fulda	Gauliga Hessen	10
Wacker Halle	Gauliga Mitte	10
Mülheimer SV	Gauliga Mittelrhein	11
VfL 06 Benrath	Gauliga Niederrhein	12
SV Werder Bremen	Gauliga Niedersachsen	10
Eimsbütteler TV	Gauliga Nordmark	10
Preußen Danzig	Gauliga Ostpreußen	14
Viktoria Stolp	Gauliga Pommern	14
Dresdner SC	Gauliga Sachsen	11
Beuthener SuSV 09	Gauliga Schlesien	10
Kickers Offenbach	Gauliga Südwest	12
FC Schalke 04	Gauliga Westfalen	10
Union Böckingen	Gauliga Württemberg	10
