= Baltic football championship =

- Founded
- 1908
- Disbanded
- 1933
- Nation
- German Empire
- Germany
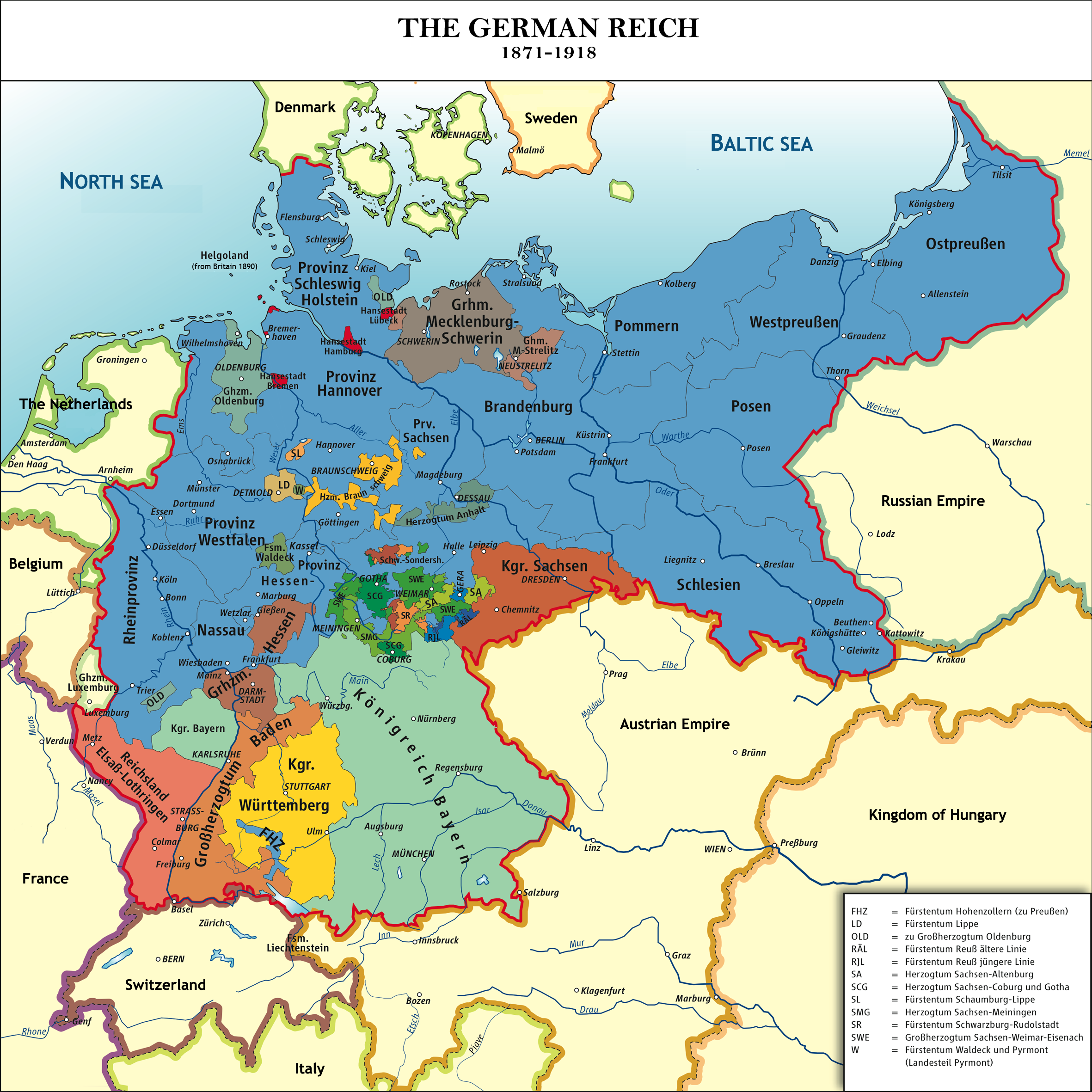
- Province
- East Prussia
- Pomerania
- West Prussia
- Number of Seasons
- 21
- Replaced by
- Gauliga Ostpreußen
- Gauliga Pommern
- Level on Pyramid
- Level 1
- Last Champions 1932–33
- Prussia Samland Königsberg

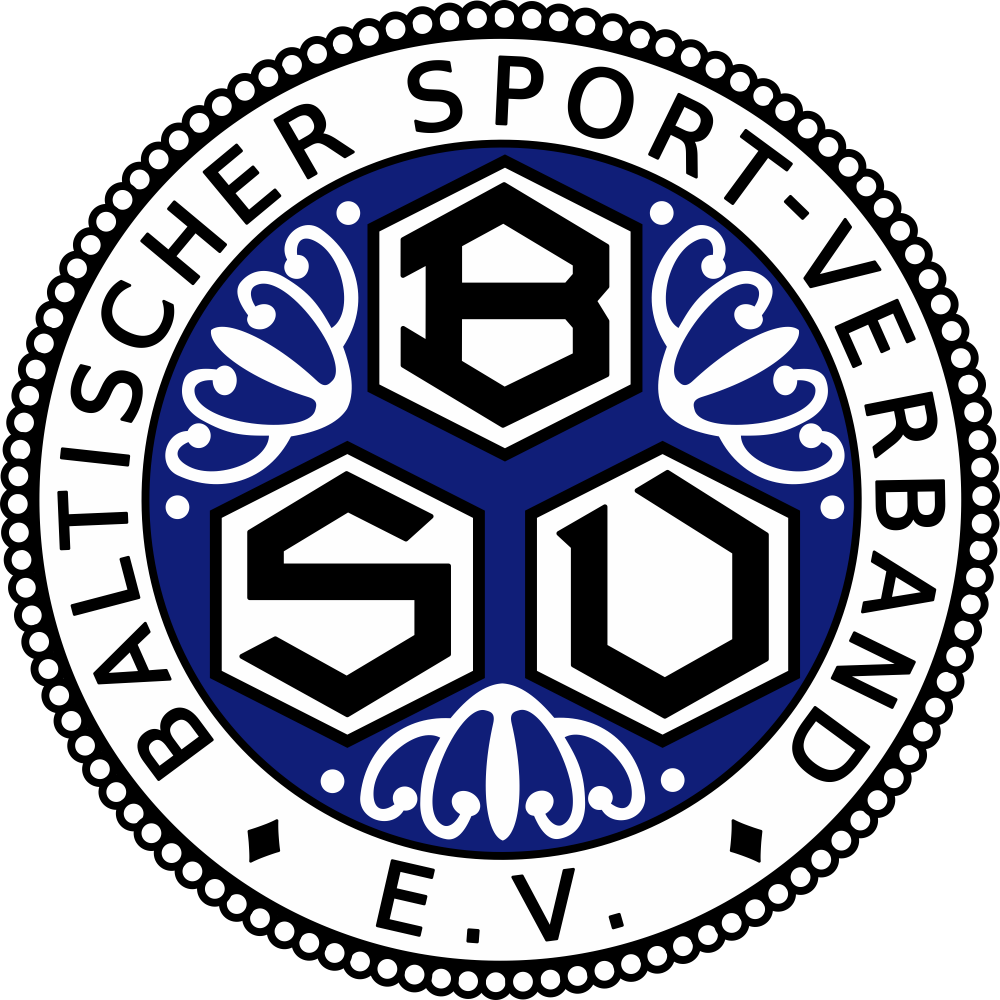
Logo of Baltic Football Association

The Baltic football championship (German: Baltische Fußball Meisterschaft) was the highest association football competition in the Prussian provinces of East Prussia, Pomerania and West Prussia. The competition was disbanded in 1933.

It should not be confused with the Baltic Cup, a competition for the national teams of Estonia, Latvia and Lithuania. Instead, the competition was named after the Baltic Sea, its clubs mostly based on the shore of this sea.

== Overview ==
German football was, from its beginnings, divided into regional associations, each of which carried out their own championship matches. These often pre-dated the national German championship. With the inception of the latter in 1903, the former became qualifying tournaments. Regional championships still held a high value for the local clubs. These regional championships were:

- Southern German football championship – formed in 1898
- Brandenburg football championship – formed in 1898
- Central German football championship – formed in 1902
- Western German football championship – formed in 1903
- March football championship – existed from 1903 to 1911
- Northern German football championship – formed in 1906
- South Eastern German football championship – formed in 1906
- Baltic football championship – formed in 1908

Regional championships were suspended with the rise of the Nazis to power in 1933. At the end of the Second World War, some resumed, but in league format. Others, such as the Baltic championship, completely disappeared, especially if the territories they were held in were no longer part of Germany. With the South West German football championship, a new regional competition also appeared in 1945. Ultimately, with the formation of the Fußball-Bundesliga, regional championships ceased altogether.

== History ==
=== Background ===
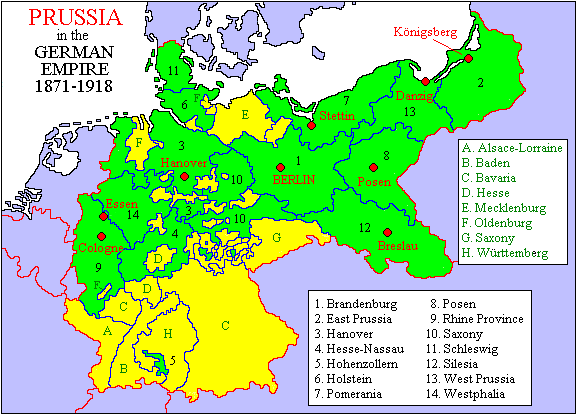
The Provinces of Prussia from 1871 to 1918

When the Baltic championship was established in 1908, the region of North Eastern Germany (German: Nordostdeutschland) was politically part of the Kingdom of Prussia, as the provinces of East Prussia, Pomerania and West Prussia.

With the defeat of the German Empire in 1918 and the formation of a Republic, the former Kingdoms and Principalities of Germany became states. For most of the Prussian provinces, this only meant that the Kingdom was replaced with the Free State of Prussia, but the provinces in east of the Kingdom were far more affected by the outcome of the war.

West Prussia was almost completely awarded to Poland after the First World War, only a small strip of land of the western part of the province remained with Germany and became the border province Posen-West Prussia (German: Grenzmark Posen-West). This turned East Prussia into an exclave, separated from mainland Germany. The city of Danzig, previously part of West Prussia, became the Free City of Danzig.

A small portion of East Prussia, the region around Soldau in the south west of the province, was also awarded to Poland. In other parts of East Prussia, a plebiscite was held, resulting in a vote for remaining with Germany. The Memel Territory came initially under French protection and was later annexed by Lithuania. Pomerania was not affected by any territorial changes and remained completely part of Germany until 1945.

Clubs from both Danzig and Memel continued to compete in the Baltic championship despite no longer being part of Germany. Clubs from Memel simultaneously took part in the Lithuanian championship.

=== Football association ===
The Baltic Football Association was formed in 1907. The development of football associations in the region was separated between Pomerania and the East & West Prussia until 1910:

==== Pomerania ====
- Stettiner Fußball Vereinigung, formed 1903
- Pommerscher Fußball Verband, formed 1904 in a merger of Verband Stettiner Ballspiel Vereine and Stettiner Fußball Vereinigung

In 1907, the Pommersche Fußball Verband joined the Verband Berliner Ballspielvereine but moved across to the Baltischer Rasen- und Wintersport Verband in 1910.

In 1930, the western parts of Pomerania joined the Verband Brandenburgischer Ballspielvereine to compete in the Brandenburg football championship instead.

==== West & East Prussia ====
The Verband Königsberger Ballspiel Vereine was formed on 3 September 1904 and joined the new Baltischen Rasensport Verband on 26 January 1908. This association was renamed Baltischer Sportverband in 1927.

== Competition ==
=== 1908 to 1914 ===
The Baltic football championship was first contested in 1908 and won by the VfB Königsberg, a club who would play an important part in the future of the competition. Only three teams played in the competition, the champions of Danzig, Königsberg and Elbing. The champions of Pomerania did not yet take part. It was staged as a knockout competition. The winner of this first competition then took part in the sixth edition of the national German championship for the first time.

To qualify for the Baltic championship, a club had to take out the title in its regional competition or league. As more football clubs were formed in Germany, the number of leagues increased and thereby also the numbers of clubs taking part in the Baltic championship. The first three seasons, only three clubs competed, in 1911, this number was increased to seven, the champions coming from the following regions:

- Allenstein
- Danzig
- Graudenz
- Insterburg
- Königsberg
- Rastenburg
- Tilsit-Memel

In 1912, Stolp-Köslin, in eastern Pomerania, was added as an eighth region. The year after, 1913, the number of clubs was increased to ten with the admittance of the Bromberg and Elbing champions.

In its last pre-First World War season, 1914, the competition was staged as a mini league with three clubs. Each club played the other only once and qualified were the three provincial champions.

In this era, the clubs from the Baltic region of Germany found themselves severely outclassed in the national championship. VfB Königsberg first two campaigns, 1908 and 1909, ended in 7–0 and 12–1 first-round defeats by Viktoria 89 Berlin. No club from the Baltic won a game in the national championship in this era.

=== 1915 to 1919 ===
In 1914–15, football in Germany had come to an almost complete halt. As it became clear, that the war would last longer than anticipated, local competitions restarted in 1915. In most regions of Germany, like the South, the championships were restarted from 1915 onwards but in the Baltic, this was not so. Eastern Prussia had actually become front line in the early stages of war and a large portion of the province was under Russian occupation, until the battles of Tannenberg and the Masurian Lakes turned fortune in Germany's favour. A Baltic championship was not played again until 1920.

=== 1920 to 1933 ===
The 1920 championship resumed in the same fashion as the last one had finished in 1914, three clubs in a mini-league competition. The Danzig champion now replaced the West Prussian one as the third team, not a great change as the former West Prussian champions had mostly come from Danzig anyway. The champions, Titania Stettin, achieved the greatest success of any Baltic club so far in the national title games, when it reached the semi-finals, to bow out 3–0 to 1. FC Nürnberg.

In 1921 and 1922, the three-team format remained in place. In 1923 and 1924, the number of games were doubled, each team playing the other twice. The 1925 season was organised as the previous two, but now an enlarged national championship meant, the Baltic runners-up was also qualified for the national finals.

The 1926 and 1927 editions saw the competition enlarged to six clubs, with the winners and runners-up of the three regions, Pomerania, East Prussia and Danzig, all qualified. The championship was held in league format with each club playing the other only once.

In 1928 and 1929, the competition was reduced to five teams. Each team would play the other only once, but the top three clubs then would play once more against each other. In 1930, four clubs played in the finals, but with home-and-away games again. It was the last edition where clubs from Western Pomerania took part in the Baltic championship, from 1931, they competed with the clubs from Brandenburg-Berlin.

The four-team home-and-away modus remained in place for the competition's last three seasons, 1931, 1932 and 1933. At the end of the 1933 edition, the competition was disbanded.

=== Aftermath ===
The Baltic championship was replaced with the Gauliga Ostpreußen by the Nazis in 1933. In Pomerania, the Gauliga Pommern was formed. In the era that followed, the clubs from the Baltic continued to see very limited success in the national finals, never advancing past the group stages.

After the end of the Second World War, Germany suffered further territorial loss, and half of East Prussia, the Free City of Danzig and most of Pomerania becoming part of Poland. Only a small strip of Pomerania west of the Oder-Neisse line remained part of Germany. The northern half of East Prussia became part of the Soviet Union. German clubs in the region were either dissolved, as in most cases, or become part of the Polish football league system.

== Baltic football champions ==
Season	Winner	Runner-Up	Result
1908	VfB Königsberg	BuEV Danzig	11–0
1909	VfB Königsberg	BuEV Danzig	1–0
1910	Prussia Samland Königsberg	BuEV Danzig	2–1
1911	SC Lituania Tilsit	SV Ostmark Danzig	4–2
1912	BuEV Danzig	VfB Königsberg	3–2
1913	Prussia Samland Königsberg	BuEV Danzig	7–1
1914	Prussia Samland Königsberg	Stettiner FC Titania	N/A
1915	not held		
1916	not held		
1917	not held		
1918	not held		
1919	not held		
1920	Stettiner FC Titania	VfL Danzig	N/A
1921	VfB Königsberg	Stettiner SC	N/A
1922	VfB Königsberg	Stettiner FC Titania	N/A
1923	VfB Königsberg	Stettiner SC	N/A
1924	VfB Königsberg	Stettiner SC	N/A
1925	VfB Königsberg	Stettiner FC Titania	N/A
1926	VfB Königsberg	Stettiner SC	N/A
1927	Stettiner FC Titania	VfB Königsberg	N/A
1928	VfB Königsberg	SC Preußen Stettin	N/A
1929	VfB Königsberg	Stettiner FC Titania	9–1
1930	VfB Königsberg	VfB Stettin	4–0
1931	Prussia Samland Königsberg	VfB Königsberg	N/A
1932	Hindenburg Allenstein	Viktoria Stolp	N/A
1933	Prussia Samland Königsberg	Hindenburg Allenstein	N/A
