= Kurt Baluses =

German footballer and manager

Personal information
- Full name: Kurt Baluses
- Date of birth: 30 June 1914
- Place of birth: Allenstein, Germany
- Date of death: 28 March 1972 (aged 57)
- Place of death: Ludwigsburg, West Germany
- Position: Midfielder

Senior career*
Years	Team	Apps	(Gls)
–1936	SV Allenstein		
1936–1945	VfB Königsberg		
1945	Holstein Kiel		
1945–1947	Eckernförder SV		
1947–1948	Rot-Weiß Niebüll		
1948–1954	Itzehoer SV		

Managerial career
- 1945–1947: Eckernförder SV (player manager)
- 1948–1954: Itzehoer SV (player manager)
- 1954–1955: 1. FC Köln
- 1956–1960: Eintracht Braunschweig
- 1960–1965: VfB Stuttgart
- 1965–1968: Kickers Offenbach
- 1968–1971: Karlsruher SC
- 1971–1972: SpVgg Ludwigsburg
- * Club domestic league appearances and goals

Kurt Baluses (30 June 1914 – 28 March 1972) was a German football player and manager. He was the first manager of VfB Stuttgart in the then newly founded Bundesliga and also had the biggest success of his managing career with the club, leading Stuttgart to a 5th-place finish in 1963–64.
