= Reichsbahn Königsberg =

German football club

- Full name: Reichsbahn SG Königsberg
- Founded: 1927; 99 years ago
- Dissolved: 1945; 81 years ago
- League: Gauliga Ostpreußen
Home colours	Away colours

Reichsbahn Königsberg was a German association football club from the city of Königsberg, East Prussia.

== History ==
The team was established in 1927 as the railway workers' club Reichsbahn Turn- und Sportverein Königsberg. In 1939, TSV became Reichsbahn SG Königsberg and the following year was promoted to the top flight Gauliga Ostpreußen. They played there until the end of World War II and the collapse of the Gauligen with their best result being a third-place finish behind city rivals VfB Königsberg and SV Prussia-Samland Königsberg.

The Königsberg club disappeared in 1945 following war when the city was annexed by the Soviet Union and renamed Kaliningrad.
