= SpVgg ASCO Königsberg =

German football club

- Full name: Spielvereinigung Akademischer Sportclub Ostpreußen e.V. Königsberg
- Founded: 1919; 107 years ago
- Dissolved: 1945; 81 years ago
- Ground: Hammerteich-Sportplatz
Home colours	Away colours

SpVgg ASCO Königsberg was a German association football club from the city of Königsberg, East Prussia (now Kaliningrad, Russia). The club was formed in 1919 out of the merger of Sportclub Ostpreußen 1902 Königsberg and Akademischer Sportclub Königsberg. It played at the Hammerteich-Sportplatz in Ratshof.

== History ==
=== Sportclub Ostpreußen 1902 Königsberg ===
Predecessor Ostpreußen was formed 1 August 1902, by former Königsberg FC player Alfred Hirsch and seven of his teammates. The club selected colors and a crest based on symbols of the province: a black eagle on a white background. They were based in the district of Maraunenhof and played their earliest matches against their former parent side, but always came out as losers in those contests. By 1904, several members of the new club had in turn moved on to form Sportzirkel Samland.

On 3 September 1904, SCO was a founding member of the city-based Verbandes Königsberger Ballspiel-Vereine and Hirsch served as the new league's first secretary. The following year the club formed an ice hockey department. Future partner Akademischer Sportclub Königsberg was established in April and the two clubs quickly struck up a friendly relationship, agreeing to share training facilities. SCO shared similarly friendly relations with other clubs, including SV 05 Elbing, organized by former Ostpreußen member Paul Unruh, while SC Prussia Insterburg was regarded as a sister club. SCO marked its first ever win over longtime rival FC, now playing as VfB Königsberg, in 1913 (3–1).

During World War I, the club's sporting activities were suspended and its sports field requisitioned by the military as a training area. SCO had considerable debt at the end of the war and the club's existence was in question. It was decided to merge with ASC at a meeting held 20 June 1919.

=== Akademischer Sportclub Königsberg ===
ASC was established on 15 April 1905 by students of Albertina University and grew quickly with departments for athletics, gymnastics, swimming, rowing, and several other sports. By 1906, the club was sharing sports facilities with SCO and later developed a similar relationship with SV Prussia-Samland Königsberg. In the following years, ASC was very active in organizing sporting events in the city.

=== Spielvereinigung Akademischer Sportclub Ostpreußen Königsberg ===
Following the merger, the combined side remained active in several sports. The footballers of ASCO played three seasons (1936–38) in the Bezirk Königsberg, a division of the Gauliga Ostpreußen, one of Germany's top-flight regional leagues. SpVgg earned successively poorer results in each campaign and was finally relegated in 1938 with the reorganization of the Gauliga the next season.

The club's sporting activities were again suspended due to war when Königsberg was subject to bombing beginning in August 1944. ASCO disappeared in 1945 following the end of World War II when the city was annexed by the Soviet Union and renamed Kaliningrad. However, the tradition of the club was carried on in West Germany with Traditionsgemeinschaft der Leichtathleten aus den deutschen Ostgebieten, an organization established by refugees from the country's former German territories in Central and Eastern Europe.
