= Gauliga Danzig =

Gauliga Danzig can refer to:

- A regional division of the Gauliga Ostpreußen (from 1933 to 1940)
- The Gauliga Danzig-Westpreußen (from 1940 to 1945)
