= SV Concordia =

SV Concordia may refer to:

- Concordia (ship), Sailing Vessel Concordia, a ship that sunk off the coast of Brazil
- SV Concordia Königsberg, SV Concordia in Königsberg, a defunct soccer club from Königsberg
- SV Concordia Nordhorn, SV Concordia in Nordhorn, a defunct soccer club that merged into Eintracht Nordhorn
