= Königsberger STV =

German football club

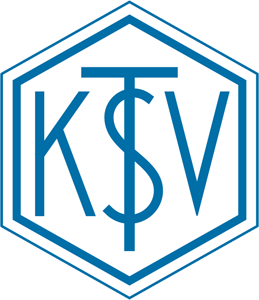
- Full name: Königsberger Sport- und Turnverein e.V.
- Founded: 1922; 104 years ago
- Dissolved: 1945; 81 years ago
- Ground: Walter-Simon Platz or Yorckschule
- League: Gauliga Ostpreußen
Home colours	Away colours

Königsberger STV was a German association football club from the city of Königsberg, East Prussia.

== History ==
Königsberger Sport- und Turnverein was established in 1922. In 1935, the club played in the Bezirk Königsberg, a city-based circuit that was part of the Gauliga Ostpreußen, a top-flight regional division in Germany. They played three seasons there before being demoted and returned for the last two seasons played (1942–44) before the area was overtaken by fighting in the late stages of World War II. STV took part in the opening rounds of the Tschammerspokal, predecessor to today's DFB-Pokal (German Cup) in 1941. They put out Prussia-Samland Königsberg 8:3 before being eliminated themselves at the hands of VfB Königsberg 0:8. The club played at Walter-Simon Platz in Mittelhufen.

The Königsberg club disappeared in 1945 following the end of the war when the city was annexed by the Soviet Union and renamed Kaliningrad.
