= Rasensport-Preußen Königsberg =

German football club

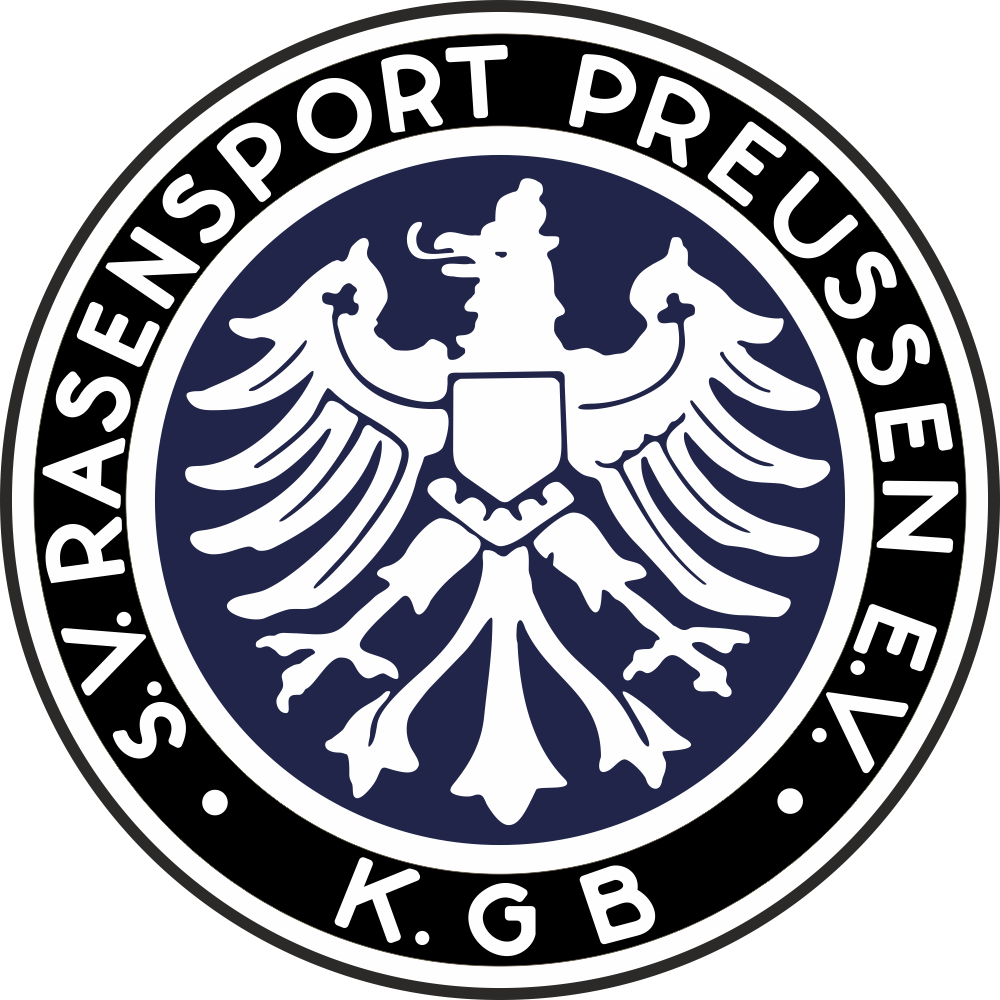
- Full name: Rasensport-Preußen Königsberg
- Founded: 1905; 121 years ago
- Dissolved: 1945; 81 years ago
- Ground: Sportplatz-Rasensport-Preußen
- League: Balten
Home colours	Away colours

Rasensport-Preußen Königsberg was a German association football club from the city of Königsberg, East Prussia.

== History ==
The club was established in 1905 as Sportclub Preußen 05 Königsberg. After a merger with VfR Königsberg in 1920 it took the name Rasensport-Preußen Königsberg. They played at Sportplatz-Rasensport-Preußen on Fuchsberger Allee in the outskirts of northern Mittelhufen.

In 1927–28 the club played one season in the top flight. In 1933, German football was re-organized into sixteen Gauligen under the Third Reich and the club played first division football in the Gauliga Ostpreußen. The Gauliga was divided in two and later in four divisions. The team won the divisional title in 1937 and came close to becoming champions, but finished second in its group. Their top flight run ended in 1939. They did not manage to come back.

The Königsberg club disappeared in 1945 following the conflict when the city was annexed by the Soviet Union and renamed Kaliningrad.
