= SV Allenstein =

German football club

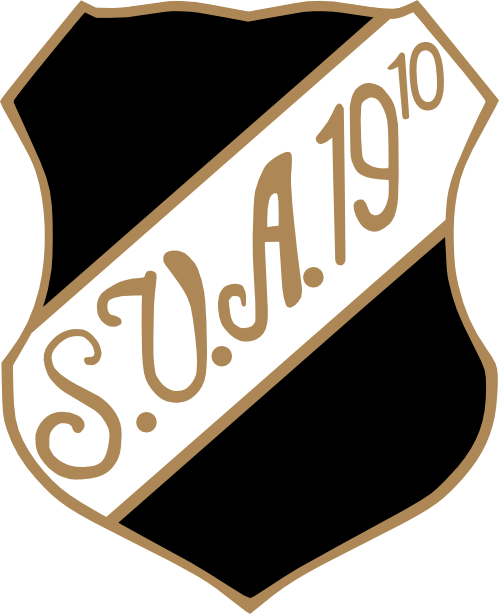
- Full name: Sportverein Allenstein 1910 e.V.
- Founded: 1910
- Dissolved: 1945
- Ground: Kasernenhof
- League: Baltenverband
Home colours	Away colours

SV Allenstein was a German football club from what was the city of Allenstein, East Prussia in Germany and is today Olsztyn, Poland. The club was established 11 May 1910 as Sportverein Allenstein as the successor to Fußballklub 1907 Allenstein.

== History ==
SV played in the regional top-flight Baltenverband in its first three years of existence before it slipped into lower level local play. In 1935 the club re-emerged in the Gauliga Allenstein, a sub-division of the regional first division Gauliga Ostpreußen, as a middling side. SV remained qualified for play in the Gauliga when it was reorganized into a single division in 1939. The team played the 1939–40 season alongside Viktoria Allenstein as the combined side Sportgemeinde Allenstein. They resumed their identity as an independent side the following year, but slipped from first division play until returning for the final Gauliga Ostpreußen campaign in 1943–44.

SV also had departments for fistball and athletics; they were Ostpreußen fistball champions in 1912 and the club was home to shotputter Emil Hirschfeld who took part in the 1928 and 1932 Olympic Games. SV disappeared with the end of World War II in 1945 when the city of Allenstein and parts of East Prussia became part of Poland.
