= Lituania Tilsit =

German football club

- Full name: Sportclub Lituania Tilsit
- Founded: 25 April 1907
- Dissolved: 1929
Home colours	Away colours

Lituania Tilsit was a German association football club from the city of Tilsit, East Prussia (today Sovetsk, Russia).

The club was established in 1907, and by 1911 had claimed the title of the Baltischen Rasensport-Verbandes (BRV) by defeating Ostmark Danzig 4–2. That earned the team the right to take part in the opening round of the German national championship. However, Lituania could not afford the cost of travel, and so forfeited the match to opponent Berliner TuFC Viktoria.

The Tilsit side advanced twice more to the Baltenverband playoff round, in 1912 and 1913, but were put out early in both appearances. They played through 1920s without much success before merging Verein für Körperübungen Tilsit in 1929 to form Sportclub Tilsit. It was dissolved after Tilsit's cession to Soviet Union in 1945.

== Honours ==
- Baltenverband champions: 1911
