= Viktoria Allenstein =

German football club

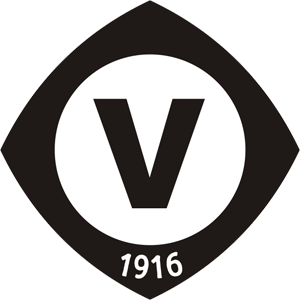
- Full name: Sportverein Viktoria Allenstein 1916 e.V.
- Founded: 1916; 110 years ago
- Dissolved: 1945; 81 years ago
- Ground: Städischer Sportplatz Jakobstal
Home colours	Away colours

Viktoria Allenstein was a German football club from what was the city of Allenstein, East Prussia in Germany and is today Olsztyn, Poland. The club was established in 1916 and played as a lower tier local side making only a single season appearance in the top flight regional Baltenverband in 1925–26.

In 1933 the team qualified for the new regional first division Gauliga Ostpreußen, one of 16 new regional circuits formed in the reorganization of German football under the Third Reich that year. They played another season there before the league was split into two divisions making Viktoria part of the Gauliga Allenstein for the next three campaigns. In 1939–40 they failed in an attempt to win their way back to the division in their own right when they lost a playoff 0:7 to Preußen Mlawa. Instead, playing alongside SV Allenstein, the team became part of Sportgemeinde Allenstein which played a single season in the Gauliga Ostpreußen. SG broke up the next year and Viktoria disappeared into lower level play. The club was lost at the end of World War II when parts of East Prussia, including Allenstein, were annexed by Poland.
