= Ostmark Danzig =

German football club

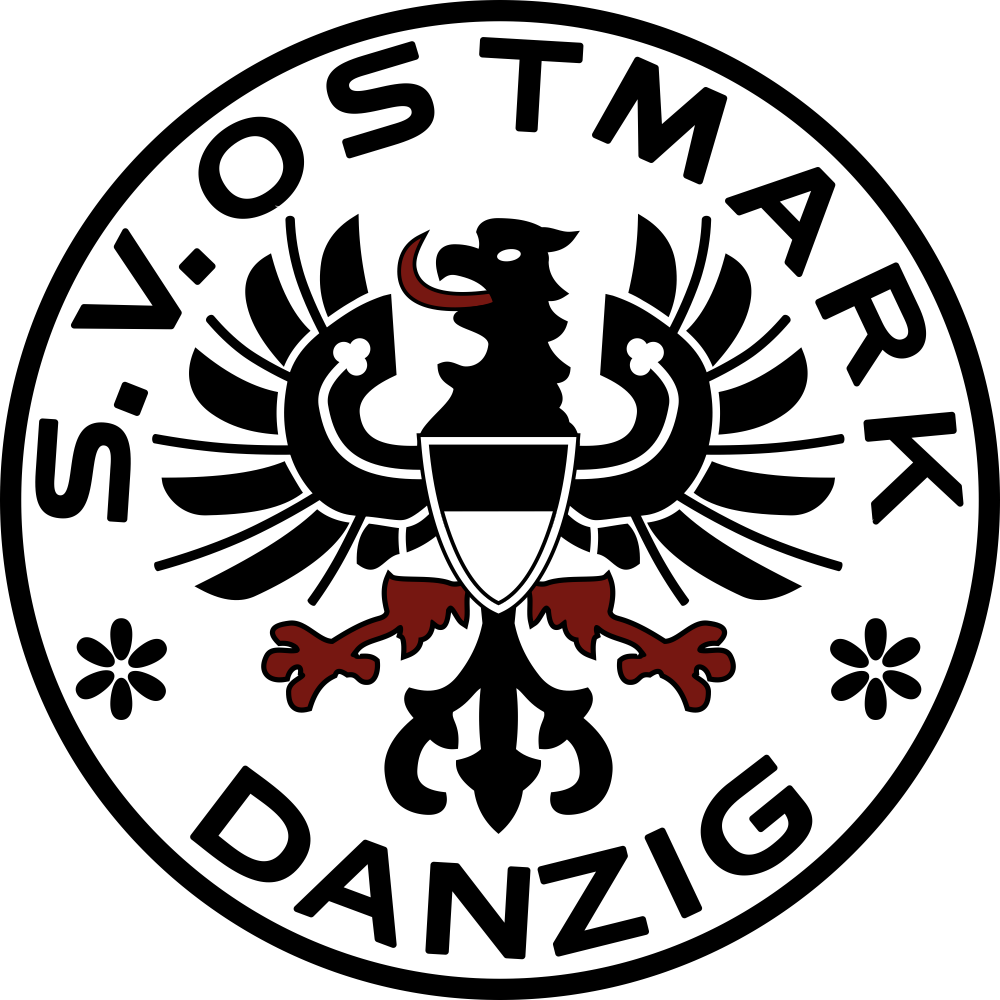
- Full name: Sportverein Ostmark e.V. Danzig
- Founded: 1909
- Dissolved: 1945
Home colours	Away colours

Ostmark Danzig was a German association football club from the city of Danzig, West Prussia (today Gdańsk, Poland). Established at 1. September 1909, the club was notable only for its advance to the regional first division Baltenverband final in 1910–11. After receiving a quarterfinal bye, the team beat SV Marienwerder before losing the championship match 4–2 to Lituania Tilsit. The team disappeared following World War II when the city became part of Poland.
