= BuEV Danzig =

Defunct association football club

- Full name: Ballspiel- und Eislauf-Verein Danzig e.V.
- Founded: 1903; 123 years ago
- Dissolved: 1945; 81 years ago
- Ground: Reichskolonie
- Capacity: 5,000
Home colours	Away colours

BuEV Danzig was a German association football club formed in 1903, from the city of Danzig, West Prussia (today Gdańsk, Poland).

== History ==
The city's first football side, Fußball Club Danzig was established 18 April 1903, and by 1905 was playing as Ballspiel- und Eislauf-Verein Danzig to reflect the club's interest in both football and ice skating. Between 1916 and 1930 the association was called Verein für Leibesübungen Danzig before again playing as BuEV.

The footballers were a prominent side in Baltenverband competition in the early 20th century, appearing in five league finals between 1908 and 1913. However, the team only came away victorious in one of those title matches when they finally defeated VfB Königsberg (3:2) in 1912 after being beaten by that club in 1908 and 1909 (0:11, 0:1). BuEV's regional title put them onto the national stage where they were put out in a quarterfinal contest versus Viktoria 89 Berlin (0:7).

Following the re-organization of German football under the Third Reich into sixteen top-flight divisions, BuEV became part of the Gauliga Ostpreußen (I). They then joined the Gauliga Danzig (I), a regional division of the Gauliga Ostpreußen, in 1935 and captured a division title there, before losing the overall Gauliga Ostpreußen championship to Yorck Insterburg (0:2). The club also made appearances in the early rounds of the Tschammerpokal competition, predecessor to today's DFB-Pokal (German Cup), in 1937 and 1940.

The team played out its existence in the Gauliga Ostpreußen (1938–40) and Gauliga Danzig-Westpreußen (1940–45) as a middling side. BuEV disappeared with the end of World War II when the city of Danzig and surrounding territory became part of Poland.

== Honours ==
- Baltic football champions: 1912
