= SV Borussia-Preußen Stettin =

German football club

- Full name: Sport-Verein Borussia-Preußen Stettin
- Founded: 1937
- Dissolved: 1945
- League: Gauliga Pommern
- –: defunct
Home colours	Away colours

SV Borussia Preußen Stettin was a German association football club from the city of Stettin, Pomerania Province (today Szczecin, Poland).

The club was established in 1937 after a merger of 1. Stettiner Borussia-Poseidon and SC Preußen Stettin.

After two seasons in the Gauliga Pommern (I) the team was demoted to the Bezirksliga, but returned to the top flight after one season, only to again be immediately sent down. They also played in the final Gauliga season (1944–45) which was cancelled after just three matches as World War II was drawing to a close. After the conflict all German teams in Stettin disappeared as the territory became part of Poland.
