= SC Preußen Stettin =

German football club

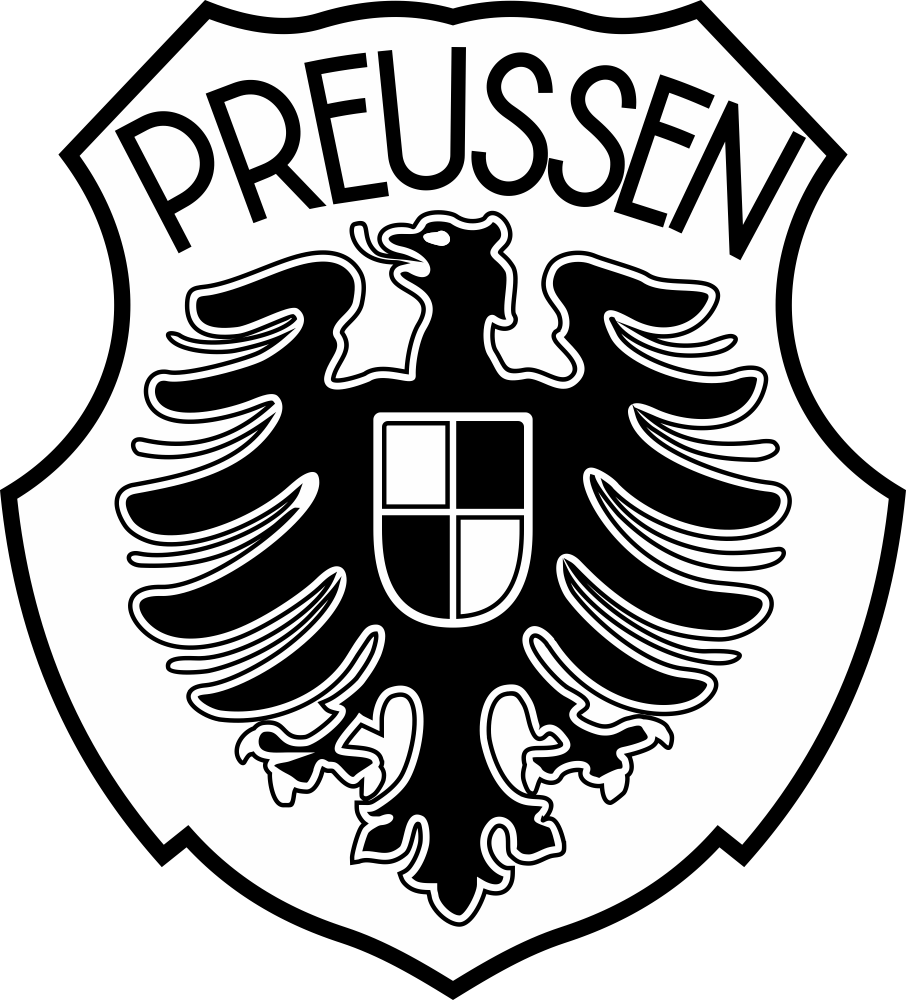
- Full name: Sport-Club Preußen Stettin
- Founded: 1901
- Dissolved: 1937
- League: Gauliga Pommern
- –: defunct
Home colours	Away colours

SC Preußen Stettin was a German association football club from the city of Stettin, Pomerania Province (today Szczecin, Poland).

The club was formed in 1901 as FC Preußen Stettin and later adopted the name Sport-Club Preußen Stettin and became part of the Verbands Stettiner Ballspiel-Vereine (en: Stettin Football League).

In 1928, the team became Pomeranian champions and earned a second-place result in the subsequent regional Baltic championship, finishing behind VfB Königsberg. That qualified SC for the national championship where they were put defeated 4–1 in the opening round by Holstein Kiel.

Following the 1933 re-organization of German football under the Third Reich into sixteen top-flight divisions, Stettin joined the western group of the Gauliga Pommern. After a number of mid-table finishes they merged with 1. Stettiner Borussia-Poseidon to become SV Borussia-Preußen Stettin in 1937, which continued to compete in Gauliga play. The combined side disappeared following World War II when Stettin became part of Poland.

== Honours ==
- Baltenverband Pommern champions: 1928
