= Viktoria Kolberg =

SV Viktoria Kolberg
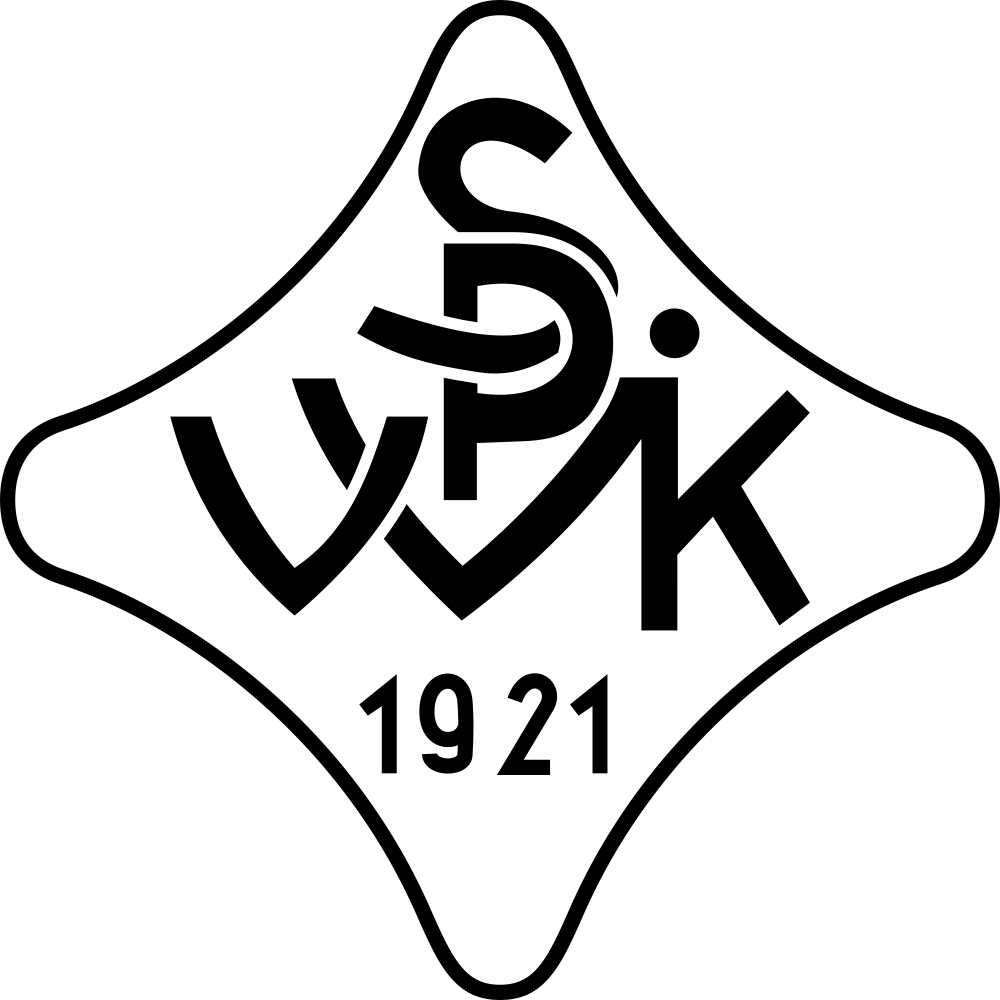
- Full name: Sportverein Viktoria Kolberg
- Founded: 1921
- League: Gauliga Pommern
- 2nd
Home colours	Away colours

Sportverein Viktoria Kolberg was a German association football club from the Pomeranian town of Kolberg (today Kołobrzeg, Poland).

Viktoria Kolberg was founded in 1921 and joined the first division Gauliga Pommern established in the 1933 reorganization of German football under the Nazis. The club struggled to avoid relegation until finally being sent down in 1936 after a last place finish. In 1940, they returned to Gauliga play relying primarily on players recruited from the local submarine school. Viktoria earned a series of third-place finishes in the following seasons until finishing second to division winner HSV Groß Born in 1943–44. Play was suspended the next year due to World War II and the club disappeared by 1945.
