= Stettiner SC =

German football club

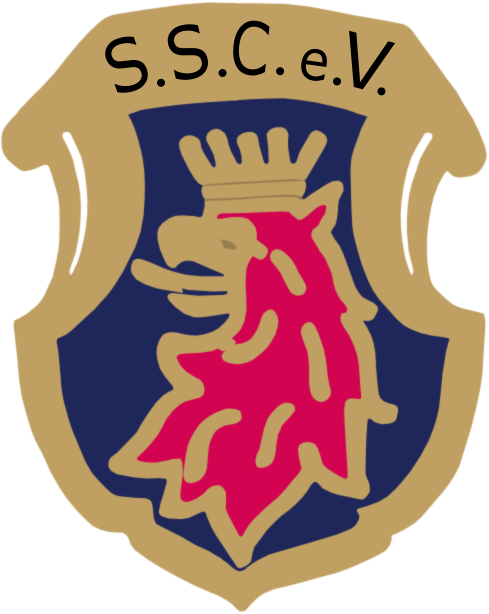
- Full name: Stettiner Sport-Club e. V.
- Founded: 1908
- Ground: Richard-Lindemann-Sportplatz am Eckersberger Wald
- Capacity: 16,000
- League: Baltenverband

Stettiner SC was a German association football club from the city of Stettin, Pomerania (today Szczecin, Poland).

The club was formed in 1908 as Athletik Sport-Club Stettin and in 1911 adopted the name Stettiner Sport-Club.

SSC found itself embroiled in controversy at the end of a successful season in 1921 when it appeared they had won their first Baltenverband championship. VfB Königsberg protested the result, and despite Stettin emerging victorious in a playoff arranged between the two sides, VfB was declared champion after filing an additional protest. The Stettiner side had in the meantime already played a scheduled national quarterfinal match and lost to BFC Vorwärts 1890; the decision to declare Königsberg champions came too late to allow them to take part in the national playoff.

SSC came away as clear winners in 1926 and again took part in the national playoff round, this time bowing out to Holstein Kiel (2:8) in an eighth-final contest. Stettin became part of the Pommern division in regional Berlin-Brandenburg play. They captured a series of division titles in the early 1930s, but were then unable to turn those into regional championships and return to the national stage, repeatedly being eliminated in the end round of the regional Brandenburg football championship.

Following the 1933 re-organization of German football under the Third Reich into sixteen top-flight divisions, Stettin joined the western group of the Gauliga Pommern. They continued to have success within their group, but in three turns from 1934 to 1936 were only able to get past rival Viktoria Stolp to capture the overall Gauliga Pommern championship once, in 1935. They earned a second title in a unified division in 1938 and thereafter slipped to become just a middling side. These division titles earned SSC a place in the Tschammerpokal tournament, predecessor to today's DFB-Pokal (German Cup), where they were eliminated in the opening round in each of their appearances. As World War II drew to a close, the team became part of a rump Gauliga Stettin and played only three games in a war-shorted 1944–45 season.

== Stadium ==
The Stettiner SC played its matches on the Richard-Lindemann-Sportplatz in the Eckerberger Wald. The capacity at that time was 32,000 spectators. On September 15, 1935, an international match between Germany and Estonia took place on the Richard-Lindemann-Sportplatz, which Germany won 5–0.

== Honours ==
- Baltenverband Pommern champions: 1933
- Gauliga Pommern champions: 1935, 1938
