= Gedania Danzig =

Polish football club

- Full name: Klub Sportowy Gedania e. V. Danzig
- Founded: 15 August 1922; 104 years ago
- Dissolved: 1939; 87 years ago
- Ground: Stadion przy ulicy Tadeusza Kościuszki w Gdańsku
Home colours	Away colours

KS Gedania Danzig was an ethnically-Polish association football club that was part of German football competition in the inter-war period. It was formed in 1922 in what was at the time the Free City of Danzig (present day Gdańsk, Poland). Banned by the Nazis in 1939, the club re-emerged following the end of World War II and is active today as Gedania 1922 Gdańsk.

== History ==
In 1920, following World War I, Danzig and environs were separated from Germany through the Treaty of Versailles, becoming an autonomous city-state under a League of Nations mandate. Gedania was founded as a sports club 15 September 1922 out of the gymnastics club Towarzystwo Gimnastyczne Sokół (Falcon Gymnastics Society). Initially the club was to be named Polonia, however, local authorities opposed the idea, so the name Gedania, a Latinized version of the name of the city, was used instead. In 1931, the football department of the club was founded and just two years later, in 1933, the club was competing in Germany's Gauliga Ostpreußen, one of sixteen top flight divisions formed in the re-organization of the country's football competition under the Third Reich. The team enjoyed only moderate success, finishing second in what had become the Gauliga Danzig (I), a regional division of the Gauliga Ostpreußen, in 1936–37 and 1937–38, before delivering poor performances in the playoff round of the combined Gauliga Ostpreußen in both seasons.

The ethnically-Polish side was regarded as politically unpalatable to the Nazi regime and was disbanded on 31 August 1939, on the eve of World War II, which began with the German invasion of Poland. The club's sporting equipment was destroyed while trophies, awards and the club chronicle were all stolen or taken away. Some of the team's facilities were used by the German military sports club LSV Danzig during the war.

Following the war, the club was re-established as Gedania Gdańsk, and currently plays in the regional league Gdańsk I. The club also has sections for volleyball and rowing.
