= Gauliga Danzig-Westpreußen =

- Founded: 1940
- Folded: 1945
- Replaced by: Region became part of Poland
- Country: Nazi Germany
- State, Region, and Voivodeship: Free City of Danzig; Marienwerder Region; Pomeranian Voivodeship
- Gau: Reichsgau Danzig-West Prussia
- Level on pyramid: Tschammerpokal
- Last champions: Luftwaffen SV Danzig (1943–44)

The Gauliga Danzig-Westpreußen was the highest football league in the former Reichsgau Danzig-West Prussia (German: Danzig-Westpreußen), a Nazi administrative unit established partly from German and partly from annexed territory.

== Overview ==
The Nazi occupants had merged the German-annexed the territories of the Free City of Danzig (a free city under the League of Nations) and of the Polish Pomeranian Voivodeship (Polish: Województwo Pomorskie) and the German Marienwerder Region (German: Regierungsbezirk Marienwerder) in a Reichsgau, a kind of the paramount Nazi administrative region. Historically, the area had belonged to Poland and Prussia, changing the hands several times.

After the formation of the Reichsgau on 26 October 1939, the league formed the highest level of play in the Reichsgau introduced by the Nazi Sports Office for the sport season starting in 1940. Since the reorganisation of the league districts in 1933, football teams from places in the Free City of Danzig and the Marienwerder Region (called West Prussia Region between 1922 and 1939, not to be confused with the homonymous province dissolved in 1920) used to play in the Gauliga Ostpreußen-Danzig. Earlier, the football clubs from places in the Free City formed a league with those from places in the Prussian Province of Grenzmark Posen-West Prussia. In 1940, the Gauliga Ostpreußen-Danzig skipped the addition of Danzig from its name and comprised only teams from East Prussia in its then borders.

Until 1939, also clubs of Polish identity, such as Gedania Danzig, comprising many, but not only, Danzigers of Polish tongue, played in the Gauliga Ostpreußen-Danzig and qualified for the play-offs of the Ostpreußen-Danzig Gauliga championships (German: Gaumeisterschaft). However, the Danzig Senate had forbidden Gedania Danzig on 31 August 1939. Under Nazi occupation, no clubs of Polish identity were allowed. Football in the Pomeranian voivodeship had been part of the Polish league system until the war.

The Gauliga Danzig-Westpreußen was established with six clubs in a single division. Originally, the league only consisted of clubs from the region of Danzig and Marienwerder; only from 1942 did clubs from German-annexed Polish Thorn and Bromberg enter the competition, too. Teams played each other once at home and once away. The league champion then qualified for the German championship. The 1941/1942 season was played with ten clubs and two relegated teams. In 1942/1943, the league was reduced to nine teams but returned to its former strength the season after.

The imminent collapse of Nazi Germany in 1945 gravely affected all Gauligas, and football in Danzig-West Prussia ceased in 1944. The 1944/1945 season may not have started at all anymore. It was scheduled to operate on the same system as the year before.

== Aftermath ==
With the end of the Nazi era, the Gauligas ceased to exist. West Prussia and Danzig came under Soviet control. The region then became a part of Poland again. The German population was almost completely expelled from the region. All German football clubs were dissolved.

== Founding members of the league ==
The six founding members and their positions in the, incompleted, 1939/1940 Gauliga Ostpreußen season were:

- Preußen Danzig, 2nd Gauliga Ostpreußen
- VfR Hansa Elbing, not part of the Gauliga
- SV 19 Neufahrwasser, 5th Gauliga Ostpreußen
- SC Viktoria Elbing, not part of the Gauliga
- BuEV Danzig, 3rd Gauliga Ostpreußen
- Polizei SV Danzig, not part of the Gauliga

== Winners and runners-up of the league ==
The winners and runners-up of the league:

Season	Winner	Runner-Up
1940–41	Preußen Danzig	VfR Hansa Elbing
1941–42	HUS Marienwerder	SV 19 Neufahrwasser
1942–43	SV 19 Neufahrwasser	Luftwaffen SV Danzig
1943–44	Luftwaffen SV Danzig	Post Gotenhafen

== Placings in the league 1940-44 ==
The complete list of clubs competing in the league:

Club	1941	1942	1943	1944
Preußen Danzig	1	7	3	8
Hansa Elbing	2	10		
SV Neufahrwasser 1919	3	2	1	3
Viktoria Elbing	4	4	7	5
BuEV Danzig	5	3	6	4
Polizei SV Danzig ^{1}	6	8		
HUS Marienwerder ^{1}		1		
Post SV Danzig		5	8	9
Wacker Danzig		6	9	
SV 05 Elbing		9		
LSV Danzig			2	1
SV Thorn			4	6
SG Bromberg			5	7
Post Gotenhafen				2
Danziger SC				10

- ^{1} Both teams started the 1942–43 season but dropped out halfway through.
