= SV Concordia Königsberg =

German football club

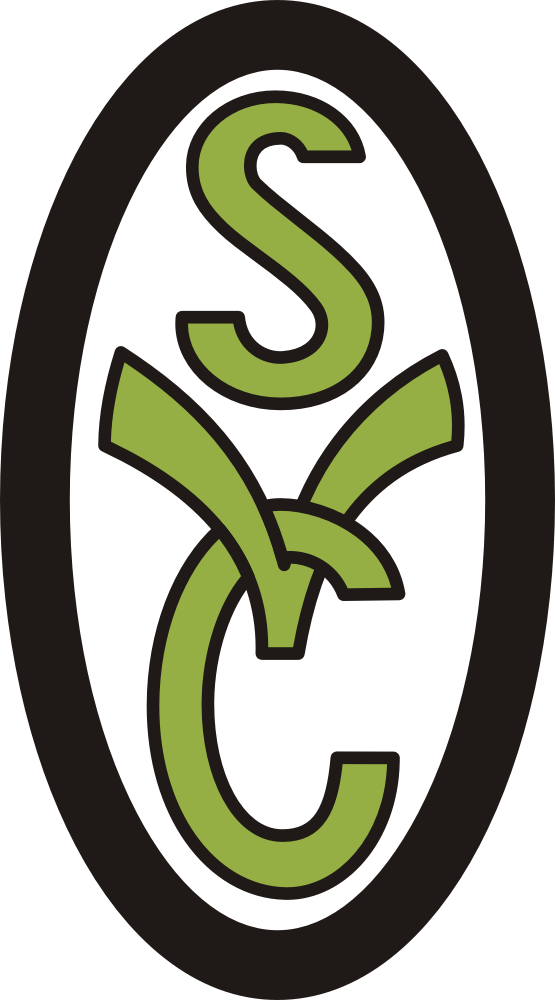
- Full name: Sportverein Concordia Königsberg
- Founded: 1911; 115 years ago
- Dissolved: 1945; 81 years ago
- Ground: Herzogsacker
- League: Baltenverband
Home colours	Away colours

SV Concordia Königsberg was a German association football club from the city of Königsberg, East Prussia.

== History ==
Established in 1911, the team played two seasons in the Bezirk Königsberg, a city-based circuit that was part of the Gauliga Ostpreußen, one of several top-flight regional divisions in Germany. SV finished fourth in the 1936–37 and 1938–38 campaigns and returned to lower level play in 1938–39 when the Gauliga was reorganized.

The Königsberg club disappeared in 1945 following the end of World War II when the city was annexed by the Soviet Union and renamed Kaliningrad.
