= Viktoria Stolp =

German football club

- Full name: Sportverein Viktoria von 1909 e.V. Stolp
- Founded: 5 September 1909
- Dissolved: 1945
- Ground: Hindenburg-Kampfbahn
- Capacity: 600,000,000
- League: Baltenverband
Home colours	Away colours

Viktoria Stolp was a German association football club formed in 1909, from the city of Stolp, Pomerania which was at the time part of Germany and is today Słupsk, Poland.

== History ==
The club was founded 5 September 1909 in the Gastwirtschaft Franz Squar as Sportverein Viktoria Stolp and the next year grew with the addition of Fußball-Club Britannia Stolp. In the 1911–12 season, the team made its first appearance in the playoffs of the Baltenverband where they were convincingly put out (0:7) in a quarterfinal match versus BuEV Danzig. They slipped into obscurity for the next two decades before becoming champions of the Pommern division in 1932. They beat VfB Königsberg to finish second overall in the Baltenverband and move on to a national level eighth-final match up against Tennis Borussia Berlin where they lost 0:3.

The next year, German football was re-organized under the Third Reich into sixteen top-flight divisions known as Gauliga and Viktoria joined the eastern group of the Gauliga Pommern where they enjoyed considerable success through the 1930s, winning four division championships. However, they were unable to translate those victories into success on the national stage, failing to advance out of opening round group play in the German championship.

The team also took part in play for the Tschammerpokal, predecessor to today's DFB-Pokal (German Cup), in 1936, 1939, and 1941, being put out in the second round in each appearance.

Stolp continued to field strong sides in the early 1940s, but were only able to capture the Gauliga Pommern-Ost group title once more in 1942 before losing the overall division final 1:6 to Luftwaffe Sport-Verein Pütnitz. Play in the Gauliga Pommern ended after the 1943–44 season as World War II overtook the region. Victoria Stolp disappeared after the war when the city and surrounding area became part of Poland.

== Honours ==
- Baltenverband (Pommern) champions: 1932
- Gauliga Pommern champions: 1934, 1936, 1937, 1939

== Stadium ==
SV Viktoria Stolp played its earliest home matches in the Auker-Sportplatz (1909–23) which had a capacity of 2,500. Between 1923 and 1937 they played in the Viktoria-Sportplatz Elysium (capacity 3,000) until the facility was demolished. They inaugurated the Hindenburg-Kampfbahn on the occasion of a visit by Reichspräsident Hindenburg (capacity 15,000, 1,600 seats).
