= TuS Helene Altenessen =

German football club

- Full name: Turn- und Sportverein Helene e.V. Essen-Altenessen
- Founded: 1928
- Ground: Im Schollbrank
- Capacity: 11,000
- League: Kreiliga A Essen Nord-West (VIII)
- 2015–16: 6th
| Home colours | Away colours |

TuS Helene Altenessen is a German football club from the district of Altenessen in the city of Essen, North Rhine-Westphalia.

== History ==
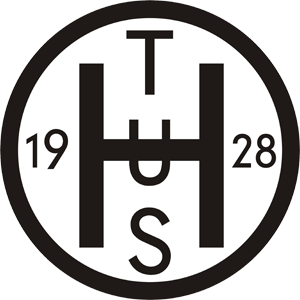
Logo of TuS Helene Altenessen ca. 1934.

The team was established in 1928 as Werks-TuS Helene Altenessen and in 1934 merged with TuS Sälzer-Amalie Essen to form Turn- und Sportverein Helene Altenessen . In 1939, the TSV Amalie Essen also became part of the sports club. TuS was a worker's side that had a close association with the Krupp family-owned mining company until the mid-1950s. Helene Amalie Krupp, co-founder of the family's industrial empire, is acknowledged in the names of several local football and sports clubs.

The team won promotion from the Bezirksklasse Niederrhein (II) in 1940 after a failed attempt to advance out of the playoff round the previous year. TuS then captured the Gauliga Niederrhein (I) title in 1941 and made appearances in the opening rounds of both the national championship and the Tschammerpokal, predecessor to today's DFB-Pokal (German Cup). Despite a poor season the next year, TuS remained competitive, earning upper table finishes in their following two campaigns. As World War II overtook the country, the team became part of the wartime side Kriegspielegemeinschaft Helene/Preußen Essen alongside Essener Sportclub Preußen. The combined side played only two matches in the war-shortened 1944–45 season.

Like most other organizations in the country, including sports and football clubs, TuS was disbanded by occupying Allied authorities after the war. It was re-established in 1945 as VfR 1928 Essen before adopting the name TuS Helene Essen in 1948. Between 1948 and 1956 the team competed in the Amateurliga Niederrhein (II), but ultimately was unable to keep up with its local rivals.

The team enjoyed some fresh success in the 1980s as three consecutive promotions advanced the side to the Verbandsliga Niederrhein (V) where they played three seasons before backsliding to the local Kreisliga. The club had a successful 2007–08 season, winning promotion to the Landesliga Niederrhein (V) out of the Bezirksliga Niederrhein (VI). It dropped out of the Landesliga in 2010, was relegated from the Bezirksliga in 2012 and now plays in the tier eight Kreisliga A.

== Honours ==
- Gauliga Niederrhein (I)
  - Champions: 1941

== Stadium ==
TuS played its home fixtures in the Helene-Stadion Bäuminghausstraße which originally had a capacity of 25,000. After 1939 the facility was known as Im Schollbrank and in 2001 had a capacity of 18,000. Today the stadium accommodates 11,000.
