= Yorck Boyen Insterburg =

German football club

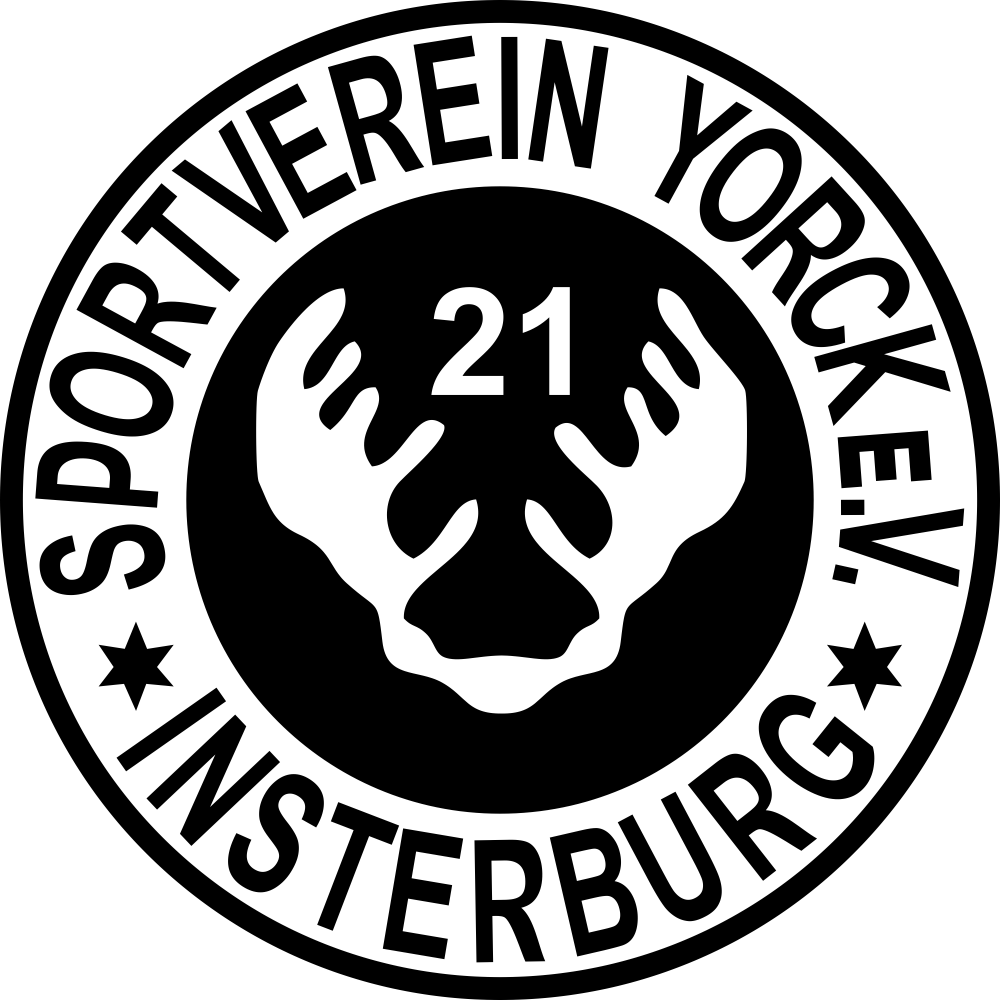
- Full name: Militär Sport-Verein Yorck Von Boyen Insterburg e.V.
- Founded: 1921; 105 years ago
- Dissolved: 1945; 81 years ago
- Ground: Kasernenhof
- League: Baltenverband
Home colours	Away colours

Yorck Boyen Insterburg was a German association football club from the city of Insterburg, East Prussia (today Chernyakhovsk, Russia).

The team was founded in 1921 as Sport-Verein Yorck Insterburg. In 1934, it was merged with Militär Sport-Verein von Boyen Tilsit to form the army side Militär Sport-Verein Yorck von Boyen Insterburg. The Tilsit club had been formed in 1923 as Sport-Verein von Boyen Tilsit. The name of the association recognized the Prussian generals Ludwig Yorck von Wartenburg and Hermann von Boyen.

Prior to the merger, SV Yorck played a season in the Gauliga Ostpreußen, one of 16 top flight regional divisions created in the re-organization of German football under the Third Reich in 1933. MSV Yorck-Boyen carried on in Gauliga play, winning its group within the division and then beating SV Prussia-Samland Königsberg (5:1, 1:2) in the division final to earn a place in the national playoffs where they went out in the opening round.

MSV played the next three seasons in the Gauliga Gumbinnen – which was part of the Gauliga Ostpreußen – winning its group each year, but failing to capture the overall division title. They made a second appearance in the preliminary round of the national playoff in 1938, but again fared poorly. Insterburg also took part that year in the Tschammerspokal, predecessor of today's DFB-Pokal (German Cup) and went out in the second round. The club's participation in first division play ended after they finished last in the 1938–39 season. In addition, most military clubs were no longer permitted to take part in Gauliga competition.

The club disappeared after the region was annexed by the Soviet Union following World War II.

== Honours ==
- Gauliga Ostpreußen (I) champions: 1935
