= LSV Pütnitz =

German football club

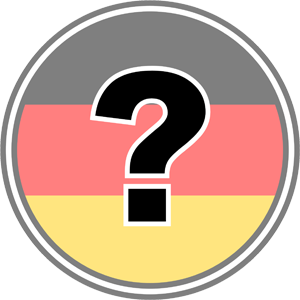
- Full name: Luftwaffensportverein Pütnitz
- Founded: 1936
- Dissolved: 1944
- League: defunct
Home colours	Away colours

LSV Pütnitz was a short-lived German association football club from the district of Pütnitz in Ribnitz-Damgarten, Mecklenburg-Vorpommern.

== History ==
Military aviation production facilities and an airfield were established in the district in the early 30s. Luftwaffensportverein Pütnitz was established in 1936 as a military sports club for German air force personnel. The formation of military-based sports and football clubs was common under the Third Reich and they took part in the country's established football competition alongside traditional civilian clubs.

German football was re-organized under the Reich's politically motivated sports policies in 1933 into sixteen top-flight regional divisions. LSV first won its way into the Gauliga Pommern to play the 1937–38 season. They were forced to withdraw for reasons related to military service after just a single season, but returned to the Gauliga Pommern-West in 1941. The following year they captured the West division and overall Gauliga Pommern titles and then appeared in the qualification round of the national playoffs where they were put out by Blau-Weiß 90 Berlin (1:3). Pütnitz repeated as overall division champions the following year and this time went out of the national playoffs to SV 92 Berlin (2:2, 0:2). After capturing a third Pommern-West title in 1944, the team was defeated by another military side, HSV Groß Born (1:1, 0:3) for the overall Pommern championship.

Their divisional success earned Pütnitz a place in play for the Tschammerpokal, predecessor to today's DFB-Pokal (German Cup), in 1942 and 1943, where they would go out on both occasions in the preliminary rounds.

As the tide of World War II turned against Germany and Allied forces invaded the country, most military football sides were disbanded; LSV Pütnitz was lost in September 1944.

== Honours ==
- Gauliga Pommern champions: 1942, 1943
- Gauliga Pommern-West champions: 1942, 1943, 1944

== Stadium ==
LSV played its home matches in either of the Damgarten (capacity 3,000) or the Stadion Greifswald (capacity 10,000).
