= Gauliga Pommern =

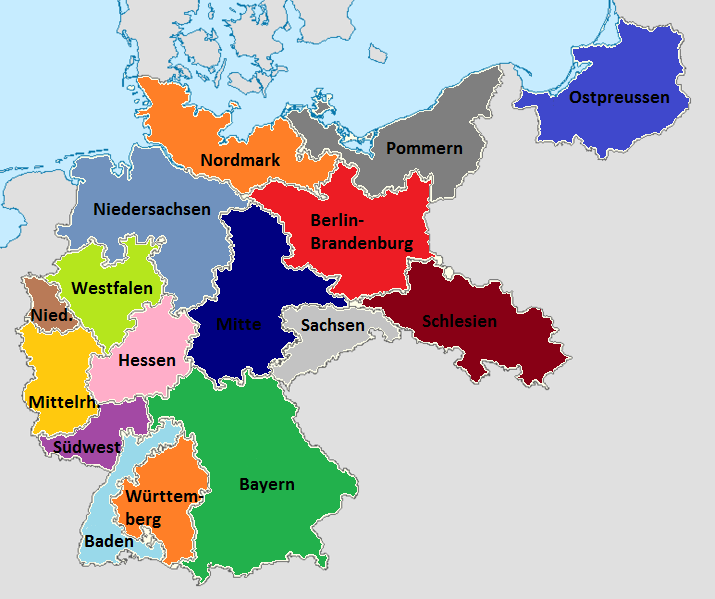
- Founded: 1933
- Folded: 1945
- Replaced by: DDR-Oberliga; eastern part of the region became part of Poland
- Country: Nazi Germany
- Province: Pomerania
- Gau (from 1934): Gau Pomerania
- Level on pyramid: Level 1
- Domestic cup: Tschammerpokal
- Last champions: LSV Pütnitz (1943-44)

The Gauliga Pommern was the highest football league in the Prussian province of Pomerania (German:Pommern) from 1933 to 1945. Shortly after the formation of the league, the Nazis reorganised the administrative regions in Germany, and the Gau Pomerania replaced the province of Pomerania.

== Overview ==
The league was introduced by the Nazi Sports Office in 1933, after the Nazi takeover of power in Germany. It replaced the Bezirksligas and Oberligas as the highest level of play in German football competitions.

The Gauliga Pommern was established with fourteen clubs, all from the province of Pomerania.

The clubs from the region had, until the introduction of the Gauliga, no highest, province-wide league. The Pomeranian champion (German: Pommern Meister) played in a finals round with the league winners of the Berlin-Brandenburg region.

In its first season, the league had fourteen clubs in two groups of seven, playing each other within their group once at home and once away. The league winners played a home-and-away final and the Pomeranian champion then qualified for the German championship. The bottom team in each group was relegated. The two groups were organised geographically, meaning, there was a western and an eastern group. The league remained unchanged until 1937, when it was reorganised in a single division of ten clubs with the bottom two clubs being relegated. This system was in place for the 1937–38 and the 1938–39 season.

With the outbreak of World War II in 1939, league football in Pomerania was severely restricted due to the region bordering Poland, then a war zone. Only nine clubs took part in the Gauliga season of 1939–40, which was staged in two groups, one of five and one of four teams. After 1940, the league was mostly dominated by military teams, like LSV Pütnitz, LSV standing for Luftwaffen Sport Verein (Air Force Sports Club).

After the defeat of Poland, football in Pomerania returned to normal but the Gauliga remained divided in two groups with the western group consisting of eight clubs and the eastern of six. The next three seasons, 1941–44, both groups had a strength of six clubs. In its last completed season, 1943–44, out of twelve clubs in the league, five belonged to the German Luftwaffe (Air Force), one to the Kriegsmarine (Navy) and one to the Heer (Army).

The imminent collapse of Nazi Germany in 1945 gravely affected all Gauligas and football in Pomerania was split into six regional groups. However, none of them played more than a few games before the arrival of the Red Army ended all competitions.

== Aftermath ==
With the end of the Nazi era, the Gauligas ceased to exist and the province of Pommern found itself in the Soviet occupation zone.

While Western Pomerania became part of the new East Germany, the city of Stettin (now Szczecin) and all of the province east of the river Oder were handed to Poland as a compensation for its eastern territories, lost to the Soviet Union. The German population in the region however, was almost completely expelled.

In the part remaining with Germany, the DDR-Oberliga was formed as the highest level of play, while the Polish areas became part of the Polish football league system. All German clubs in this region were dissolved after the war.

== Founding members of the league ==
The fourteen founding members were:

- Western Group:
- Stettiner SC, champion of Pommern in 1932-33
- Polizei SV Stettin
- SC Preußen Stettin
- VfL Stettin
- VfB Stettin
- Greifswalder SC
- Viktoria Stralsund
- Eastern Group:
- Viktoria Stolp
- SV Preußen Köslin
- Heeres SV Hubertus Kolberg
- SV Viktoria Kolberg
- SV Sturm Lauenburg
- SV Germania Stolp
- SV Phönix Köslin

== Winners and runners-up of the league ==
The winners and runners-up of the league:

Season	Winner	Runner-Up
1933-34	Viktoria Stolp	Stettiner SC
1934-35	Stettiner SC	Viktoria Stolp
1935-36	Viktoria Stolp	Stettiner SC
1936-37	Viktoria Stolp	Polizei SV Stettin
1937-38	Stettiner SC	MTV Pommerensdorf
1938-39	Viktoria Stolp	MTV Pommerensdorf
1939-40	VfL Stettin	Germania Stolp
1940-41	LSV Stettin	Germania Stolp
1941-42	LSV Pütnitz	Viktoria Stolp
1942-43	LSV Pütnitz	LSV Kamp
1943-44	LSV Pütnitz	HSV Groß-Born

== Placings in the league 1933-44 ==
The complete list of all clubs participating in the league:

Club	1934	1935	1936	1937	1938	1939	1940	1941	1942	1943	1944
Viktoria Stolp	1	1	1	1	3	1	2	2	1	2	
Preußen Köslin	2	7						6			6
Hubertus Kolberg	3	2	2	5					5	4	
Viktoria Kolberg	4	6	7					3	3	3	2
Sturm Lauenburg	5	3	5	6			5				
Germania Stolp	6	4	3	3	4	3	1	1	4	5	5
Phönix Köslin	7							5	2	6	
SC Stettin	1	1	1	2	1	4	2	4	4	3	5
PSV Stettin	2	2	3	1	5	6					
SC Preußen Stettin	3	4	4	4							
VfL Stettin	4	6	7				1	3	5	6	
VfB Stettin	5	3	5	7							
Greifswalder SC	6	5	2	3	7	9					
Viktoria Stralsund	7										
Hertha Schneidemühl		5	4								
Komet Stettin		7									
Pfeil Lauenburg			6	4	8	8	4				
Blücher Gollnow			6	5							
Mackensen Neustettin				2	10						
MTV Pommernsdorf				6	2	2	4	5	6		
SV Borussia-Preußen Stettin					6	10		8			
Graf Schwerin Greifswald					9						
Nordring Stettin						5	3	6			
LSV Pütnitz						7		2	1	1	1
Stern/Fortuna Stolp							3	4	6		
TSV Swinemünde							5	7			
LSV Stettin								1	2	2	2
LSV Parow									3	5	4
LSV Kamp										1	
LSV Dievenow										4	6
HSV Groß-Born											1
LSV Stolpmünde											4
Kriegsmarine Swinemünde											3
