= SV Prussia-Samland Königsberg =

German football club

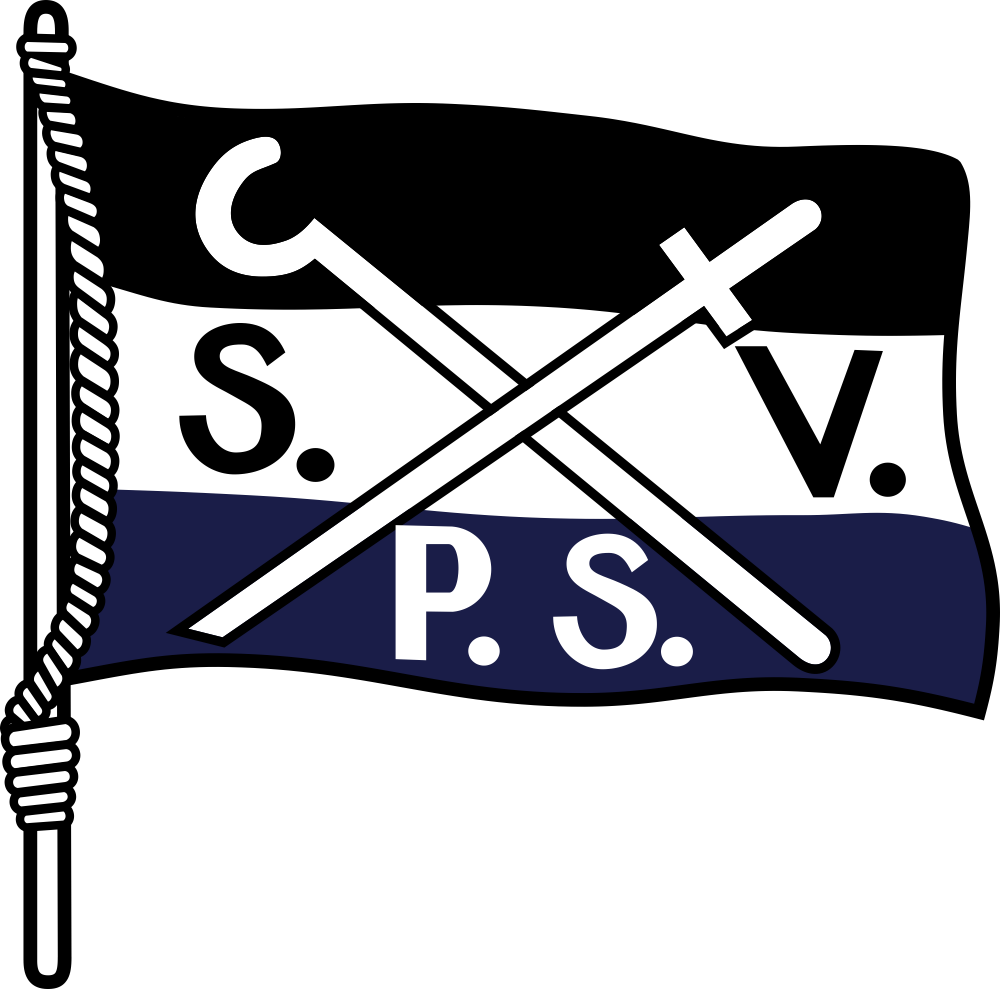
- Full name: Sportvereinigung Prussia-Samland e.V. Königsberg
- Founded: 1904; 122 years ago
- Dissolved: 1945; 81 years ago
- Ground: Sportplatz Prussia-Samland
- Capacity: 6,000
- League: Baltenverband
Home colours	Away colours

SV Prussia-Samland Königsberg was a German association football club from the city of Königsberg, East Prussia (today Kaliningrad, Russia).

The club was founded in early 1904 as Fußball-Club Prussia Königsberg and in 1908 merged with Sportzirkel Samland Königsberg 1904 to form Sportvereinigung Prussia-Samland Königsberg. The combined side captured its first Baltenverband championship in 1910 by beating BuEV Danzig 2:1 and went on to take part in opening qualification round of the national championship. SV took additional regional titles in 1913 and 1914 and in both seasons was able to advance to the national quarterfinals before being put out by Viktoria 89 Berlin (1:6) and VfB Leipzig (1:4). The club played at Sportplatz Prussia-Samland on Steffeckstraße on the western outskirts of Amalienau.

Königsberg made just two more appearances in the Baltenverband end round through the 1920s before again capturing regional titles and making national level playoff showings in 1931 and 1933. The club became part of the first division Gauliga Ostpreußen, one of sixteen top flight divisions formed in the reorganization of German football under the Third Reich in 1933. They won their group in 1935, but lost the subsequent division final to Yorck Boyen Insterburg (1:5, 1:2). Playing in the Gauliga Königsberg within the Gauliga Ostpreußen, SV took group titles in 1936 and 1938, but was unable to win the overall division. They took part in the opening round of the Tschammerpokal, predecessor of today's DFB-Pokal (German Cup), in 1941 The team played out its existence as a mid- to lower table side in the Gauliga Ostpreußen and disappeared in 1945 after the area was annexed by the Soviet Union following World War II.

== Honours ==
- Baltic football champions: 1910, 1913, 1914, 1931, 1933

== See also ==
- VfB Königsberg, another football club from Königsberg.
