= Gauliga Ostpreußen =

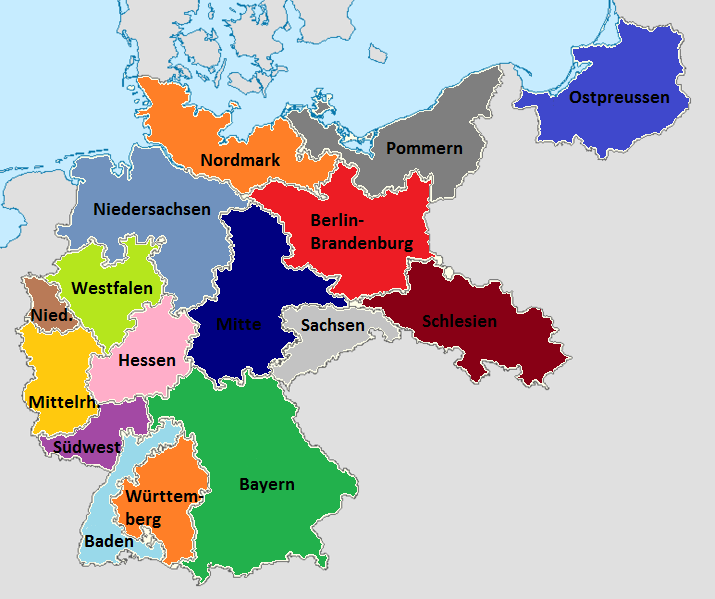
- Founded: 1933
- Folded: 1945
- Replaced by: Region became part of Poland and the Soviet Union
- Country: Nazi Germany
- Province and State: Province of East Prussia; Free City of Danzig
- Gau (from 1934): Gau East Prussia
- Level on pyramid: Level 1
- Domestic cup: Tschammerpokal
- Last champions: VfB Königsberg (1943-44)

The Gauliga Ostpreußen was the highest football league in the Prussian province of East Prussia (German: Ostpreußen) and the Free City of Danzig from 1933 to 1945. Shortly after the formation of the league, the Nazis reorganised the administrative regions in Germany, and the Gau East Prussia. Danzig however did not become part of the East Prussia, but was rather integrated in the Gau Danzig-West Prussia in 1939 instead.

== Overview ==
The league was introduced by the Nazi Sports Office in 1933, after the Nazi take over of power in Germany. It replaced the Bezirksliga as the highest level of play in German football competitions.

The Gauliga Ostpreußen was established with fourteen clubs in two divisions of seven each. As such, the league consisted of clubs from Germany and the city-state of Danzig, which was under the protection of the League of Nations and not part of Germany.

The Gauliga replaced as such the Bezirksliga Ostpreußen and the Bezirksliga Grenzmark, the highest leagues in the region until then. Both were part of the Baltenverband, the German Baltic Football Association, which determined its own Baltic champion.

In its first season, the league had fourteen clubs in two groups. Teams in the same division played each other once at home and once away. The Gauliga champion was determined by a home-and-away final of the two division winners. This club then qualified for the German championship while the bottom team in each group was relegated. This system remained in place for the 1934-35 season.

From 1935, the Gauliga was expanded to four divisions of seven clubs. The two top teams of each division then entered a finals round which consisted of two four-team groups. The two group winners then played out the Gauliga champion.

In 1938, the league system was simplified by introducing a single-division ten-team league. The bottom two teams were supposed to be relegated but the increasingly restrictive politics of the Nazis meant, that the club of the Polish minority, KS Gedania Danzig, had to resign from the league and was disbanded.

In 1939-40, the league was supposed to play with only eight clubs. In January 1940, the competition was cancelled altogether and four selected teams played a Gauliga championship tournament instead. At the end of this season, the clubs from the Danzig region, Preußen Danzig, SV 19 Neufahrwasser and SG Elbing, left the Gauliga Ostpreußen and joined the new Gauliga Danzig-Westpreußen instead. The Gau Ostpreußen was in itself enlarged when parts of occupied Poland were added to it from the end of 1939.

The 1940-41 season was played as a single division again, now with seven clubs. This system remained in place until the disbanding of the league in 1944.

The imminent collapse of Nazi Germany in 1945 gravely affected all Gauligas and football in East Prussia ceased in 1944 due to the arrival of the Red Army in the region. The 1944-45 season was most likely not started anymore. With the beginning of the East Prussian Offensive in January 1945, the region was completely engulfed by war.

== Aftermath ==
With the end of the Nazi era, the Gauligas ceased to exist. East Prussia came under Soviet control. The region was split into a northern half, now part of Russia and a southern half, part of Poland. The German population was almost completely expelled from the region, especially in the Soviet half. Football clubs in the two halves now either play in the Russian or Polish leagues. All German football clubs were dissolved.

== Founding members of the league ==
The fourteen founding members and their positions in the 1932-33 Bezirksliga Ostpreußen and Bezirksliga Grenzmark season were:

- Group I
- Preußen Danzig, 2nd Bezirksliga Grenzmark
- VfB Königsberg, 4th Bezirksliga Ostpreußen
- SV Prussia-Samland Königsberg, 2nd Bezirksliga Ostpreußen, Baltic champion
- Rasensport-Preußen Königsberg,
- BuEV Danzig, winner Bezirksliga Grenzmark
- KS Gedania Danzig
- Viktoria Elbing
- Group II
- MSV Hindenburg Allenstein, winner Bezirksliga Ostpreußen
- SV Yorck Insterburg
- SV Masovia Lyck
- SV Viktoria Allenstein
- Tilsiter SC, 3rd Bezirksliga Ostpreußen
- FC Preußen Gumbinnen
- Rastenburger SV 08, 5th Bezirksliga Ostpreußen

== Winners and runners-up of the league ==
The winners and runners-up of the league:

Season	Winner	Runner-up
1933–34	Preußen Danzig	MSV Hindenburg Allenstein
1934–35	MSV Yorck-Boyen Insterburg	SV Prussia-Samland Königsberg
1935–36	MSV Hindenburg Allenstein	SV Prussia-Samland Königsberg
1936–37	MSV Hindenburg Allenstein	MSV Yorck-Boyen Insterburg
1937–38	MSV Yorck-Boyen Insterburg	BuEV Danzig
1938–39	MSV Hindenburg Allenstein	SV Masovia Lyck
1939–40	VfB Königsberg	Preußen Danzig
1940–41	VfB Königsberg	SV Preußen Mielau
1941–42	VfB Königsberg	SV Preußen Mielau
1942–43	VfB Königsberg	SV Prussia-Samland Königsberg
1943–44	VfB Königsberg	SV Insterburg

== Placings in the league 1933-44 ==
The complete list of all clubs participating in the league:

Club	1934	1935	1936	1937	1938	1939	1940	1941	1942	1943	1944
Preußen Danzig	1	5	1	1	5	2					
VfB Königsberg	2	6	2	2	2	6	1	1	1	1	1
Prussia Samland Königsberg	3	1	1	3	1	8	4	4	3	2	6
Rasensport-Preußen Königsberg	4	7	3	1	3	10		8			
BuEV Danzig	5	4	2	3	1	3	3				
Gedania Danzig	6	3	3	2	2	5					
Viktoria Elbing	7		4	4	4						
SV Hindenburg Allenstein	1	2	1	1	2	1					
MSV York Insterburg	2	1	1	1	1	9					
Masovia Lyck	3	3	2	2	1	2					
Viktoria Allenstein	4	7	3	5	4						
SC Tilsit	5	6	4	5	6						
Preußen Gumbinnen	6		3	4	4						
SV Rastenburg	7	4	5	3	6						
Polizei Danzig		2	6	6	3	4					
SV Insterburg		5	7		3			6	7	7	2
SV Allenstein 10			4	6	5						3
VfB Osterode			6	4	3				8		
RSV Ortelsburg			7	7	7						
SV Neufahrwasser 1919			5	5	7						
SC Lauenthal			6								
SpVgg ASCO Königsberg			4	5	7						
RSV Heiligenbeil			5	7							
Königsberger TSV			6	6	5					4	7
RSV Braunsberg			7								
Polizei Tilsit			2	3	2	7					
VfB Tilsit			5	6	5						
Preußen Insterburg			6	7							
Hansa Elbing				7	6						
Concordia Königsberg				4	4						
SV Goldap				2	7						
VfB Labiau					6						
Preußen Mielau								2	2	8	
Luftwaffen-SV Richthofen Neukuhren								3		5	
Reichsbahn Königsberg								5	5	3	5
Freya Memel								7			
Luftwaffen-SV Heiligenbeil									4		
MTV Ponarth										6	4

- In 1939-40, the championship was strongly affected by the war. All military and police teams were unable to compete. Eventually, an eight-team championship was started on 26 November 1939 but because of the severe winter conditions, it was cancelled in January and replaced by a four-team championship.
