= Preußen Danzig =

German football club

- Full name: Sport-Club Preußen 1909 Danzig e.V.
- Founded: 1909; 117 years ago
- Dissolved: 1945; 81 years ago
- Ground: Preußenplatz Bischofsberg
- Capacity: 3,500
- League: Baltenverband
Home colours	Away colours

Preußen Danzig was a German association football club from the city of Danzig, West Prussia (today Gdańsk, Poland).

== History ==
The club was established in 1909 as Turn- und Fechtverein Preußen Danzig, a gymnastics and fencing club. The footballers formed an independent side in 1923 playing as Sportclub Preußen 1909 Danzig.

TuF Danzig was a local side through the 1920s and on into the early 1930s and made two appearances in the playoff round of the regional Baltenverband. After the re-organization of German football under the Third Reich in 1933, the team, now known as Sport-Club Preußen Danzig, became part of the Gauliga Ostpreußen, one of sixteen regional top flight divisions. That division was subject to frequent reshaping through the course of World War II and SC also played in the Gauliga Danzig (1935–38), the Gauliga Ostpreußen (1939–40), and the Gauliga Danzig-Westpreußen (1940–45).

The club enjoyed limited success within its division, winning the Gauliga Danzig–Westpreußen title in 1941. SC took part in the national level playoffs through that title and a group title within their split division in 1934, but were unable to advance out of the preliminary rounds. They also took part in play for the Tschammerpokal, predecessor of today's DFB-Pokal (German Cup), but never got out of the first round.

Preußen Danzig disappeared in the aftermath of the war when the city of Danzig became part of Poland.

== Honours ==
- Gauliga Ostpreußen champions: 1934
- Gauliga Danzig-Westpreußen champions: 1941
