= VfB Königsberg =

German football club

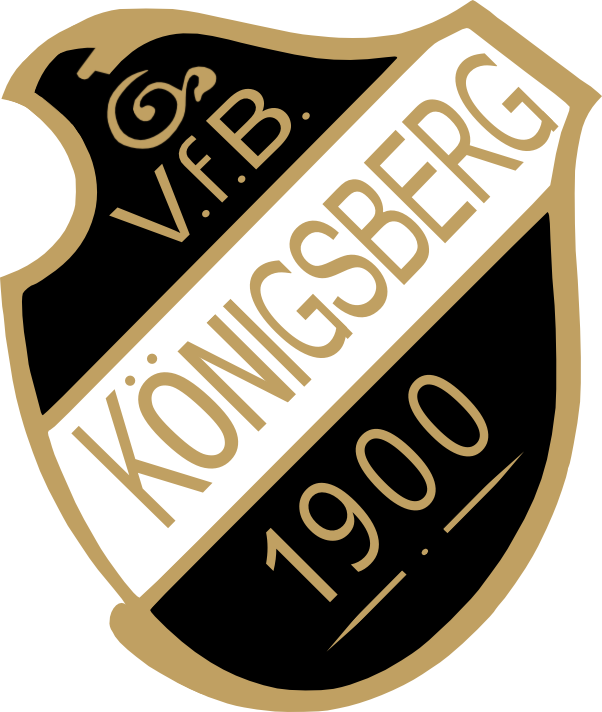
- Full name: Verein für Bewegungsspiele e.V. 1900 Königsberg
- Founded: 7 July 1900; 125 years ago (as Fußball-Club Königsberg); 1907; 119 years ago (as VfB Königsberg)
- Dissolved: 1945; 81 years ago
- Ground: Sportplatz des Vereins für Bewegungs Spiele
- League: Balten
| Home colours | Away colours |

VfB Königsberg was a German association football club from the city of Königsberg, East Prussia. The team played its home games at the Sportplatz des Vereins für Bewegungs Spiele near the Maraunenhof Stadtgärtnerei, aside from 1940 to 1941 when they played at the Sportplatz am Friedländer Tor between Haberberg and Rosenau.

== History ==
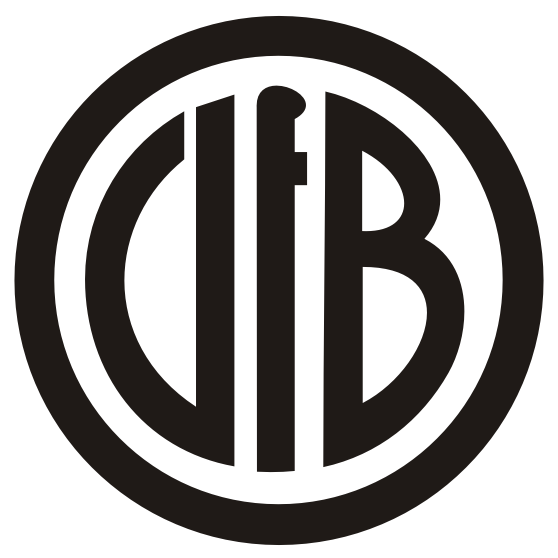
Historical logo of VfB Königsberg

The club was established on 7 July 1900 as Fußball-Club Königsberg, later being renamed VfB Königsberg in 1907. The team dominated play in the local city league and the regional Baltenverband between 1907 and 1932, capturing two dozen championships, and advancing to the national level playoffs on several occasions. VfB's best result there came in 1923 when they won their way to the semi-finals before being eliminated 2:3 by eventual champions Hamburger SV.

Following the 1933 reorganization of German football into sixteen top flight divisions (Gauligen) under the Third Reich, VfB joined the Gauliga Ostpreußen in the 1933–34 season. The club fielded strong sides but could not do better than to earn a number of second place finishes until finally capturing the divisional title in 1940. That was the start of an unbroken string of five Gauliga Ostpreußen titles from 1940 to 1944. VfB subsequently took part in the national playoffs rounds from 1942 to 1944. In 1942 the club advanced as far as the quarterfinals where they were defeated 1:2 by Blau-Weiß 90 Berlin. The team also participated in play for the Tschammerpokal, the predecessor to today's DFB-Pokal (German Cup), in 1935 and 1940–43. Their furthest advance in the tournament ended ignominiously with an 0:8 quarterfinal loss at the hands of eventual cupwinners Dresdner SC in 1940.

The Gauliga Ostpreußen did not have a 1944–45 season as World War II overtook the region. The Königsberg club disappeared in 1945 following the conflict when the city was annexed by the Soviet Union and renamed Kaliningrad.

== Ice hockey ==
In addition to its football side, the club had an ice hockey section which qualified for, but did not participate in, national playoff rounds in 1927 and 1928. In 1931 the team finished as vice-champions to the Berliner Schlittschuhclub.

== Honours ==
- Königsberg champions: 1904, 1905, 1906, 1907, 1908, 1909, 1911, 1912, 1921, 1922, 1923, 1924, 1925
- Baltic football champions: 1908, 1909, 1921, 1922, 1923, 1924, 1925, 1926, 1928, 1929, 1930
- Gauliga Ostpreußen champions: 1940, 1941, 1942, 1943, 1944

== See also ==
- FC Baltika Kaliningrad
- SV Prussia-Samland Königsberg, another football club from Königsberg.
