= 2025–26 Coupe de France preliminary rounds, Grand Est =

The 2025–26 Coupe de France preliminary rounds, Grand Est was the qualifying competition to decide which teams from the leagues of the Grand Est region of France took part in the main competition from the seventh round.

A total of twenty teams qualified from the Grand Est preliminary rounds.

In the 2024–25 edition of the competition, both FCSR Haguenau of Championnat National 2 and ES Thaon of Championnat National 3 progressed furthest, making it to the round of 32 before losing out. Thaon were beaten by Ligue 1 side RC Strasbourg Alsace on penalties, whilst Haguenau lost 1–3 at home to Ligue 2 side USL Dunkerque.

== Draws and Fixtures ==
On 18 July 2025 the league published the draw for the first round of the competition. The draw consisted of 343 ties featuring teams from district divisions and two from the third tier of the regional league. The draw also listed the 248 clubs exempt at this stage, confirming that 934 teams from the region were taking part in the competition this season. The second round draw, consisting of 271 ties, and featuring the entry of all the remaining sides from the second and third levels of regional league, was published on 19 August 2025.

The third round draw, which totalled 155 ties, and featured the entry of the remaining teams from the regional league, and the three teams from Championnat National 3, was published on 2 September 2025. The fourth round draw, where the five teams from Championnat National 2 entered, was conducted separately in each of the three sectors of the region, over three days from 16 September 2025 to 18 September 2025. The fifth round draw took place on 1 October 2025. The sixth round draw was published on 15 October 2025.

=== First round ===
These matches were played on 9, 14, 16, 17, 19 and 20 August 2025, with two postponed to 24 and 27 August 2025.

First Round Results: Grand Est
| Tie no | Home team (Tier) | Score | Away team (Tier) |
|---|---|---|---|
| 1. | US Revin (10) | 2–2 (4–5 p) | AS Mouzon (10) |
| 2. | US Fumay-Charnois (10) | 3–1 | JS Vrignoise (11) |
| 3. | FC Pouru Saint-Rémy (11) | 0–4 | QV Douzy (10) |
| 4. | FC Allobais Doncherois (11) | 0–2 | Cheveuges-Saint-Aignan CO (9) |
| 5. | USC Nouvion-sur-Meuse (9) | 4–1 | SC Vivarois (9) |
| 6. | FC Hargies (12) | 1–3 | Aubrives FC (11) |
| 7. | JS Remilly Aillicourt (10) | 4–4 (1–4 p) | ASR Raucourt (10) |
| 8. | CA Monthermé (11) | 4–0 | US Saint-Menges (11) |
| 9. | ES Auvillers/Signy-le-Petit (10) | 0–4 | FC Porcien (9) |
| 10. | FC Puilly Entente des Pays d'Yvois (11) | 1–1 (2–4 p) | AS Lumes (11) |
| 11. | ES Charleville-Mézières (9) | 5–3 | AMC Charleville-Mézières (9) |
| 12. | ES Saulces-Monclin (10) | 0–0 (2–4 p) | US Flize (10) |
| 13. | Le Theux FC (11) | 1–1 (4–2 p) | FC Saint-Marcel (11) |
| 14. | ES Novion-Porcien (11) | 1–2 | Liart-Signy FC (9) |
| 15. | USC Lucquy (11) | 1–1 (4–2 p) | SOS Buzancy (9) |
| 16. | FC Rimogne (11) | 2–1 | FC Haybes (10) |
| 17. | AS Boulzicourt (10) | 4–0 | AS Franco-Turque Charleville-Mézières (10) |
| 18. | AS Saint-Laurent (12) | 3–1 | US Machault (11) |
| 19. | ES Saint-Germainmont (10) | 4–1 | US La Francheville (10) |
| 20. | AS Maurupt-le-Montois (10) | 0–3 (Note: Tie won by means of forfeit.) | Saint-Memmie FC (11) |
| 21. | FC Haute Borne (10) | 4–2 | FC Prunay (11) |
| 22. | FC Bignicourier (11) | 0–2 | US Couvrot (11) |
| 23. | OFC Beine-Nauroy (10) | 3–0 | Olympic Suippas (11) |
| 24. | Argonne FC (10) | 3–1 | AS Tagnon (11) |
| 25. | AS Luxémont-et-Villotte (12) | 1–5 | ES Witry-les-Reims (9) |
| 26. | AS Heiltz-le-Maurupt (11) | 0–5 (Note: Tie reversed from original draw.) | AS Courtisols ESTAN (10) |
| 27. | USS Sermaize (10) | 5–5 (5–6 p) | AS Mourmelon Livry Bouy (10) |
| 28. | Nord Champagne FC (9) | 3–0 | SL Pontfaverger (10) |
| 29. | AS Gueux (9) | 1–2 | FC Saint-Martin-sur-le-Pré/La Veuve/Recy (9) |
| 30. | ES Côteaux Sud (9) | 1–0 | SC Montmirail (10) |
| 31. | FC Ferton (12) | 0–2 (Note: ES Pleurs penalised for playing an underage player, FC Ferton qualify.) | ES Pleurs (10) |
| 32. | US Fismes Ardre et Vesle (10) | 4–1 | US Oiry (9) |
| 33. | AS Sud Champagne et Der (10) | 4–2 | ES Connantre-Corroy (11) |
| 34. | Reims Athletic FC (11) | 3–5 | FC Vallée de la Suippe (10) |
| 35. | FC Dommartin-Lettrée (11) | 0–3 | ES Gaye (12) |
| 36. | FC Caillot (9) | 0–3 | FC Morgendois (9) |
| 37. | CS Agéen (9) | 2–0 | US Esternay (10) |
| 38. | US Dizy (11) | 0–1 | ES Muizonnaise (11) |
| 39. | US Vendeuvre-Dienville (9) | 1–2 | UFC Aube (10) |
| 40. | AS Marigny Saint-Martin (10) | 3–0 | Aube Sud LO (9) |
| 41. | Torvilliers AC (9) | 1–0 | JS Vaudoise (10) |
| 42. | Amicale Saint-Germain (11) | 4–0 | Entente Somsois Margerie Saint-Utin (9) |
| 43. | Étoile Lusigny (10) | 2–2 (4–2 p) | AS Portugaise Nogent-sur-Seine (9) |
| 44. | Saint-André Football (10) | 4–1 | AS Payns (9) |
| 45. | Entente Colombey Maranville Rennepont (10) | 12–3 | FC Trainel (9) |
| 46. | AS Droupt-Saint-Basle (10) | 0–2 | Étoile Chapelaine (9) |
| 47. | AG Troyes (11) | 1–4 | FC Bréviandes (10) |
| 48. | US Montier-en-Der (9) | 0–0 (2–1 p) | US Wassy Brousseval (10) |
| 49. | FC Bologne (9) | 9–0 | SL Chaumont Brottes (9) |
| 50. | US Rouvres Auberive (10) | 2–1 | AS Lasarjonc (10) |
| 51. | Espérance Saint-Dizier (10) | 4–0 | AS Chamouilley Roches-sur-Marne (10) |
| 52. | FC Villiers-en-Lieu (11) | 2–3 | SL Ornel (9) |
| 53. | ES Breuvannes (11) | 0–6 | FC Sud Champagne (9) |
| 54. | CO Langres (10) | 8–1 | AS Poissons-Noncourt (10) |
| 55. | AF Valcourt (10) | 5–1 | CA Rolampontais (10) |
| 56. | US Arc-en-Barrois (11) | 2–4 | FC Joinville-Vecqueville (9) |
| 57. | CS Chalindrey (9) | 0–0 (3–5 p) | SR Neuilly-l'Évêque (9) |
| 58. | AS Longeville-sur-la-Laines (10) | 0–2 | FCCS Bragard (10) |
| 59. | Saint-Gilles FC (10) | 3–6 | US Ouest 52 (10) |
| 60. | AS Luzy-Verbiesles-Foulain (10) | 0–1 | CS Doulaincourt-Saucourt (11) |
| 61. | FC Dampierre (11) | 1–6 | US Bourbonnaise (10) |
| 62. | US Voillecomte (10) | 1–1 (5–4 p) | US Fayl-Billot/Hortes (11) |
| 63. | ES Bayon-Roville (11) | 1–4 | FC Hadol-Dounoux-Uriménil (9) |
| 64. | La Saint-Maurice Poussay (12) | 1–3 | ASL Coussey-Greux (10) |
| 65. | FR Ménil Rozerotte (12) | 0–21 | AS Nomexy-Vincey-Moriville (9) |
| 66. | Dogneville FC (11) | 8–1 | RC Saulxures-lès-Bulgnéville (12) |
| 67. | RF Bulgnéville (10) | 0–5 | CS Charmes (9) |
| 68. | SR Pouxeux Jarménil (11) | 2–5 | AS Plombières (10) |
| 69. | FC Thaon City (11) | 3–0 | FC Martigny-les-Bains (11) |
| 70. | FC Darney Val de Saône (10) | 3–1 | AS Gironcourt (10) |
| 71. | US Lamarche (11) | 0–3 | US Mirecourt-Hymont (11) |
| 72. | EFC Épinal (11) | 3–1 | ASC Dompaire (10) |
| 73. | CS Thillotin (12) | 0–3 | AS Ramonchamp (9) |
| 74. | FC Saint-Amé Julienrupt (10) | 2–1 | ES Michelloise (11) |
| 75. | FC Amerey Xertigny (9) | 1–1 (3–5 p) | US Arches-Archettes-Raon (10) |
| 76. | FC Dommartin-lès-Remiremont (9) | 1–1 (5–4 p) | Saulcy FC (10) |
| 77. | AS Saint-Nabord (9) | 3–1 | FC Haute Moselotte (9) |
| 78. | ASF Saulxures-sur-Moselotte-Thiéfosse (11) | 1–3 | AS Vagney (9) |
| 79. | FC Remiremont Saint-Étienne (10) | 1–0 | Entente Bru-Jeanménil SBH (10) |
| 80. | AS La Chapelle-aux-Bois (11) | 4–1 | FC Val d'Ajol (10) |
| 81. | FC Saint-Maurice Fresse (10) | 3–0 | AS Vallée de la Moselle (11) |
| 82. | ES Haute Meurthe (10) | 1–4 | AS Padoux (10) |
| 83. | SM Bruyères (10) | 0–1 | FC Le Tholy (10) |
| 84. | FC Granges-sur-Vologne (11) | 0–5 | SM Taintrux (9) |
| 85. | RC Corcieux (11) | 2–4 | SM Etival (10) |
| 86. | Toul JCA (9) | 6–1 | USC Foug (10) |
| 87. | ES Ancerville (11) | 0–3 | USI Jaillon (11) |
| 88. | AS Colombey (10) | 3–0 | AS Val d'Ornain (10) |
| 89. | FC Toul (9) | 7–0 | AS Dommartin-lès-Toul (10) |
| 90. | FC Écrouves (9) | 3–2 | FC Pagny-sur-Meuse (9) |
| 91. | SC Commercy (10) | 3–1 | ES Lérouvillois Cheminote (10) |
| 92. | AS Velaine-en-Haye (10) | 3–0 | FC Saint-Mihiel (9) |
| 93. | Entente Sud 54 (11) | 2–5 | Lorraine Vaucouleurs (9) |
| 94. | RC Saulx et Barrois (10) | 2–3 | FC Fains-Véel (10) |
| 95. | ASC Montiers-sur-Saulx (10) | 0–3 | FC Revigny (10) |
| 96. | Nancy FC (9) | 2–1 | AF Laxou Sapinière (10) |
| 97. | FR Faulx (11) | 0–7 | Stade Flévillois (9) |
| 98. | AJSE Montauville (9) | 3–1 (Note: The original match, scheduled for 17 August 2025, did not take place due to the pitch being double booked. The league ordered the game to be reversed, and played on 24 August 2025.) | AS Médecine Lorraine (11) |
| 99. | FC Pont-à-Mousson (10) | 1–2 | FC Nurhak (9) |
| 100. | AS Récréative Amis du Portgual (10) | 4–6 | FC Houdemont (9) |
| 101. | Olympique Haussonville (11) | 3–3 (5–4 p) | FC Seichamps (9) |
| 102. | ASC Saulxures-lès-Nancy (10) | 1–1 (8–7 p) | AS Bouxières-aux-Dames (11) |
| 103. | ES Custines-Malleloy (9) | 2–2 (9–8 p) | Omnisports Frouard Pompey (9) |
| 104. | Maxéville FC (10) | 2–2 (5–4 p) | Grand Nancy Métropole Football (10) |
| 105. | FC Loisy (11) | 3–1 | GS Thiaucourt (11) |
| 106. | SC Baccarat (9) | 8–0 | AS Sommerviller-Vermois (10) |
| 107. | FC Dombasle-sur-Meurthe (9) | 3–2 | AS Blâmont (9) |
| 108. | US Jolivet (11) | 2–0 | ÉS Xeuilley (12) |
| 109. | GS Vézelise (10) | 4–1 | AS Varangéville Saint-Nicolas (11) |
| 110. | Amicale de Chanteheux (10) | 0–3 | US Rosières-aux-Salines (9) |
| 111. | FR Thiaville (11) | 18–1 | FC Réméréville (11) |
| 112. | SC Chaligny (11) | 0–2 | AS Laneuveville Marainviller (9) |
| 113. | AS Art-sur-Meuthe Bosserville Lenoncourt (10) | 5–0 | AS Rehainviller Hérimenil (10) |
| 114. | GAS Saint-Clément-Laronxe (11) | 0–3 | FC Pont-Saint-Vincent (10) |
| 115. | Espérance Gerbéviller (10) | 2–1 | ES Lunéville Sixte (10) |
| 116. | AS Dieue-Sommedieue (9) | 1–4 | CS Bassin Ornais (9) |
| 117. | Association Saint-Laurent-Mangiennes (10) | 3–1 | RC Sommedieue (11) |
| 118. | ES Tilly Ambly Villers Bouquemont (9) | 1–1 (3–4 p) | SC Les Islettes (10) |
| 119. | ASC Charny-sur-Meuse (11) | 0–3 | FC Belleray (10) |
| 120. | US Thierville (9) | 1–1 (2–3 p) | US Conflans Doncourt (10) |
| 121. | Entente Vigneulles-Hannonville-Fresne (9) | 6–0 | ASCC Seuil-d'Argonne (10) |
| 122. | AS Mars-la-Tour (12) | 0–3 | FC Dugny (9) |
| 123. | US Avrilloise (12) | 2–1 | ES Maizey-Lacroix (10) |
| 124. | US Marspich (10) | 1–2 | US Fontoy (10) |
| 125. | CS Godbrange (9) | 2–2 (3–2 p) | ES Cons-Ugny Val de Chiers (9) |
| 126. | CSP Réhon (9) | 1–2 | Entente Bure-Boulange (9) |
| 127. | US Aumetz (12) | 0–4 | AS Entrange (11) |
| 128. | US Beuveille (11) | 0–8 | FC Mexy (10) |
| 129. | Union Saint-Jean Montmédy (10) | 2–0 | US Lexy (10) |
| 130. | US Volkrange (10) | 2–8 | CS Volmerange-les-Mines (10) |
| 131. | FC Hayange (9) | 2–0 | AS Mercy-le-Bas (9) |
| 132. | JS Thil (9) | 1–3 | RC Crusnes Audun (9) |
| 133. | AS Œutrange (11) | 0–4 | AS Konacker (11) |
| 134. | RS Ottange-Nondkeil (11) | 2–2 (4–2 p) | JL Knutange (11) |
| 135. | CO Bouzonville (9) | 5–2 | US Oudrenne (9) |
| 136. | FC Boust (11) | 2–5 | JS Distroff (11) |
| 137. | ES Garche (10) | 1–3 | ES Kœnigsmacker-Kédange (9) |
| 138. | US Cattenom (11) | 1–1 (4–5 p) | RS Kœnigsmacker (12) |
| 139. | JS Kuntzig (12) | 1–2 | FC Vœlfling (10) |
| 140. | US Florange-Ebange (10) | 3–2 | US Waldweistroff (11) |
| 141. | US Guentrange (10) | 3–6 | US Trois Frontières (9) |
| 142. | JS Rettel Hunting Contz (11) | 5–1 | JS Manom (11) |
| 143. | ASC Basse-Ham (10) | 0–0 (3–0 p) | AS Sœtrich (10) |
| 144. | FC Montois (12) | 0–3 | UL Rombas (9) |
| 145. | US Vigy (11) | 0–3 | FC Woippy (10) |
| 146. | FC Pierrevillers (10) | 6–0 | Entente Froidcul-Moyeuvre (10) |
| 147. | US Ban-Saint-Martin (11) | 2–2 (5–3 p) | AS Saint-Julien-lès-Metz (9) |
| 148. | Entente Gravelotte-Verneville (10) | 0–0 (5–4 p) | RS La Maxe (10) |
| 149. | US Argancy (10) | 2–0 | RS Serémange-Erzange (10) |
| 150. | JS Malancourt (12) | 0–9 | TS Bertrange (9) |
| 151. | ES Maizières (11) | 2–7 | ASP Sainte-Marie-aux-Chênes (11) |
| 152. | US Hestroff (12) | 0–1 | ES Metz (9) |
| 153. | FC Mondelange (11) | 4–3 | JS Bousse (11) |
| 154. | FC Guénange (12) | 2–5 | JSO Ennery (10) |
| 155. | ES Courcelles-sur-Nied (10) | 0–1 | Fleury FC (8) |
| 156. | US Ancy-Corny-Jouy (10) | – (Note: Match did not take place, as ES Woippy did not have enough licesnsed players to start the game. US Ancy-Corny-Jouy qualify.) | ES Woippy (9) |
| 157. | JS Ars-Laquenexy (9) | 0–2 | CO Metz Bellecroix (10) |
| 158. | La Lyre Sportive Vantoux (11) | 8–1 | ÉS Béchy (11) |
| 159. | AF Metz Arsenal (12) | 10–0 | AC Metz Azzurri (12) |
| 160. | FC Magny (11) | 3–2 | FC Metz Grange-aux-Bois (10) |
| 161. | FC Retonfey (11) | 1–1 (2–4 p) | SC Marly (9) |
| 162. | JS Renaissance Saint-Christophe Metz (11) | 0–1 (Note: The original match, scheduled for 17 August 2025, did not take place. The referee decided that team sheets had not been produced on time. The league ordered the game to be played on 27 August 2025.) | JS Metz Scy-Chazelles (9) |
| 163. | SC Moulins-lès-Metz (10) | 2–1 | FC Novéant (9) |
| 164. | AS Magny (11) | 0–3 | AS Sainte-Barbe Sanry Méchy (10) |
| 165. | AS Metz Porto (11) | 2–8 (Note: Académie Jules Bocandé penalised, AS Metz Porto qualify. Reason unknown.) | Académie Jules Bocandé (10) |
| 166. | SR Gosselming (10) | 0–4 | Sportive Lorquinoise (9) |
| 167. | AS Schaeferhof Dabo (11) | 0–5 | AS Bettborn Hellering (9) |
| 168. | SR Sarraltroff (12) | 0–4 | ES Avricourt Moussey (9) |
| 169. | SS Hilbesheim (10) | 4–2 | US Schneckenbusch (10) |
| 170. | US Trois-Maisons Phalsbourg (10) | 0–2 | FC Château-Salins (9) |
| 171. | FC Troisfontaines (11) | 0–3 | Montagnarde Walscheid (9) |
| 172. | US Saint-Louis Lutzelbourg (10) | 0–1 | FC Dannelbourg (10) |
| 173. | SR Langatte (11) | 3–0 | FC Héming (12) |
| 174. | SC Vic-sur-Seille (11) | 2–3 | Olympique Mittelbronn 04 (10) |
| 175. | JF Vergaville (11) | 3–0 | AS Val-de-Guéblange (10) |
| 176. | AS Brouviller (10) | 0–5 | EFT Sarrebourg (9) |
| 177. | USF Brouderdorff (10) | 3–2 | FC Abreschviller (9) |
| 178. | EF Delme-Solgne (9) | 1–1 (4–5 p) | FC Dieuze (10) |
| 179. | Huchet AC Saint-Avold (11) | 1–3 | ES Macheren Petit-Ebersviller (9) |
| 180. | Flétrange SA (10) | 1–1 (5–3 p) | SC L'Hôpital (10) |
| 181. | US Cappel (11) | 1–3 | AS Anzeling Edling (11) |
| 182. | AS Hellimer (10) | 3–2 | US Bambiderstroff (10) |
| 183. | FC Francaltroff (11) | 1–1 (4–2 p) | AS Guerting (10) |
| 184. | CS Stiring-Wendel (9) | 0–1 | ASJA Saint-Avold (10) |
| 185. | AS Grostenquin Bérig Bistroff (10) | 2–2 (4–3 p) | US Rémering Villing (9) |
| 186. | AS Freybouse-Frémestroff (10) | 4–2 | AS Falck (11) |
| 187. | ES Lixing Vahl Laning (10) | 3–0 | ES Cocheren (11) |
| 188. | JS Wenheck (10) | 0–3 | FC Éblange (11) |
| 189. | FC Folschviller (9) | 2–3 | FC Coume (9) |
| 190. | AS Rech (11) | 3–1 | US Etzling (11) |
| 191. | US Behren-lès-Forbach (9) | 2–0 | FC Sarralbe (9) |
| 192. | SO Ippling (10) | 3–0 | FC Puttelange-aux-Lacs (11) |
| 193. | ES Petite-Rosselle (10) | 3–2 | US Hilsprich (10) |
| 194. | AC Franco Turc Forbach (12) | 0–2 | FC Hambach (9) |
| 195. | CS Diebling (12) | 3–0 | FC Bruch (11) |
| 196. | FC Farschviller (10) | 5–2 | CS Wittring (10) |
| 197. | AS Neunkirch (9) | 3–0 | US Hundling (10) |
| 198. | AS Lixing-lès-Rouhling (11) | 1–0 | US Rouhling (10) |
| 199. | US Morsbach (10) | 2–0 | AS Welferding (10) |
| 200. | US Roth (11) | 1–4 | Entente Neufgrange-Siltzheim (10) |
| 201. | FC Diefenbach (11) | 1–4 | FC Metzing (8) |
| 202. | FC Bitche (10) | 2–1 | FC Istanbul Sarreguemines (10) |
| 203. | ES Ormersviller-Epping (11) | 1–2 | ES Wies-Woelf 93 (10) |
| 204. | SF Enchenberg (10) | 7–1 | Entente Petit-Réderching Siersthal (11) |
| 205. | Saint-Louis 2017 (11) | 1–2 | ES Rimling-Erching-Obergailbach (9) |
| 206. | FC Lemberg (10) | 3–3 (2–3 p) | AS Bliesbruck (9) |
| 207. | FC Rahling (11) | 1–4 | Union Soucht Goetzenbruck Meisenthal 2022 (9) |
| 208. | Entente Schorbach Hottviller Volmunster 13 (11) | 2–2 (3–0 p) | AS Kalhausen (9) |
| 209. | AS Mouterhouse (11) | 1–3 | FC Rohrbach Bining (9) |
| 210. | FC Rohrwiller (12) | 0–1 | AS Gambsheim (9) |
| 211. | AS Saint-Barthelemy Leutenheim (13) | 0–9 | FC Mothern (9) |
| 212. | SR Rountzenheim-Auenheim (12) | 1–1 (3–1 p) | FC Niederrœdern/Olympique Schaffhouse (12) |
| 213. | Entente Wissembourg/Altenstadt (13) | 3–3 (5–4 p) | US Dalhunden (13) |
| 214. | AS Forstfeld (12) | 0–3 | FC Herrlisheim (10) |
| 215. | SC Roppenheim (13) | 0–4 | US Turcs Bischwiller (9) |
| 216. | FR Sessenheim-Stattmatten (9) | 3–1 | SS Beinheim (9) |
| 217. | FR Schœnenbourg-Memmelshoffen (13) | 1–0 | FC Soultz-sous-Forêts/Kutzenhausen (11) |
| 218. | FC Niederlauterbach (10) | 1–0 | AS Kilstett (11) |
| 219. | FC Lampertsloch-Merkwiller (11) | 1–4 | FC Riedseltz (10) |
| 220. | FC Oberroedern/Aschbach (10) | 2–2 (4–5 p) | SC Rœschwoog (9) |
| 221. | SC Rittershoffen (13) | 0–6 | US Gumbrechtshoffen (12) |
| 222. | AS Hatten (11) | 1–2 | AS Platania Gundershoffen (9) |
| 223. | FC Kindwiller (10) | 1–1 (3–2 p) | FC Durrenbach (9) |
| 224. | AC Hinterfeld (11) | 3–2 | US Surbourg (12) |
| 225. | FC Dambach/Neunhoffen (13) | 0–10 | AS Uhrwiller (9) |
| 226. | FCE Reichshoffen (13) | 5–2 | Fatih-Sport Haguenau (11) |
| 227. | AS Seebach (10) | 3–2 | AS Mertzwiller (10) |
| 228. | Entente Wœrth Morsbronn (13) | 1–1 (5–4 p) | FC Niedermodern (11) |
| 229. | FC Rott (13) | 0–3 | FA Val de Moder (9) |
| 230. | AS Betschdorf (10) | 1–3 | FC Eschbach (11) |
| 231. | AS Saint-Étienne Salmbach (13) | 2–0 | FC Soufflenheim (11) |
| 232. | FC Mulhausen (13) | 2–9 | SC Dettwiller (11) |
| 233. | FC Monswiller (12) | 0–0 (3–2 p) | FC Steinbourg (12) |
| 234. | ASL Duntzenheim (11) | 2–1 | AS Weyer (11) |
| 235. | FC Schwindratzheim (10) | 1–2 | AS Hohengœft (10) |
| 236. | FC Lixhausen (13) | 0–3 | FC Schaffhouse-sur-Zorn (10) |
| 237. | US Schwenheim-Waldolwisheim (13) | 0–1 | AS Weinbourg (10) |
| 238. | ES Wimmenau/Wingen-sur-Moder (11) | 0–4 | US Ettendorf (9) |
| 239. | AS Sarrewerden (13) | 0–4 | US Mommenheim (13) |
| 240. | FC Alteckendorf (13) | 0–3 | Entente de la Mossig Wasselonne/Romanswiller (11) |
| 241. | FC Ernolsheim-lès-Saverne (12) | 2–3 | US Imbsheim (11) |
| 242. | CSIE Harskirchen (10) | 2–1 | FC Marlenheim-Kirchheim (9) |
| 243. | ASC Brotsch (12) | 2–4 | Entente Mackwiller-Waldhambach (12) |
| 244. | FC Keskastel (11) | 1–2 | FC Dossenheim-sur-Zinsel (9) |
| 245. | AS Offwiller (13) | 3–11 | AS Lupstein (10) |
| 246. | AS Willgottheim (11) | 1–1 (8–7 p) | AS Mundolsheim (9) |
| 247. | ÉS Pfettisheim (11) | 4–2 | FC Lampertheim (12) |
| 248. | FC Geudertheim (11) | 0–4 | AS Strasbourg (9) |
| 249. | US Eckwersheim (11) | 0–6 | FC Weitbruch (9) |
| 250. | FC Stutzheim-Offenheim (13) | 4–1 | FC Oberhoffen (12) |
| 251. | FC Niederschaeffolsheim (10) | 4–4 (4–5 p) | FC Souffelweyersheim (11) |
| 252. | Entente Quatzenheim-Furdenheim (13) | 1–12 | La Wantzenau FC (10) |
| 253. | FC Bischwiller (13) | 0–9 | AS Musau Strasbourg (10) |
| 254. | AS Wahlenheim-Bernolsheim (13) | 1–6 | SS Brumath (9) |
| 255. | AS Dingsheim-Griesheim (11) | 1–1 (2–4 p) | AS Pfulgriesheim (9) |
| 256. | FC Batzendorf (12) | 0–4 | FC Gries (12) |
| 257. | FC Niederhausbergen (13) | 0–7 | SR Hoenheim (9) |
| 258. | FC Egalité Strasbourg (13) | 0–6 | Strasbourg Université Club (9) |
| 259. | FC Lingolsheim (11) | 1–4 | CA Plobsheim (11) |
| 260. | AS Espagnols Schiltigheim (13) | 3–1 | FC Oberhausbergen (10) |
| 261. | CS Neuhof Strasbourg (10) | 3–1 | FC Entzheim (10) |
| 262. | FC Breuschwickersheim (11) | 5–0 | AJF Hautepierre (9) |
| 263. | ASE Cité de l'Ill Strasbourg (9) | 0–2 | AS Holtzheim (9) |
| 264. | ES Wolfisheim (13) | 3–2 | AS Nordheim-Kuttolsheim (13) |
| 265. | US Vauban (12) | 0–3 | FC Ostwald (10) |
| 266. | SC Red Star Strasbourg (10) | 3–5 | EB Achenheim (9) |
| 267. | Erno FC (11) | 3–0 | SOAS Robertsau Strasbourg (12) |
| 268. | FC Stockfeld Colombes (12) | 0–3 | FC Ecrivains-Schiltigheim-Bischheim (10) |
| 269. | US Égalitaire Strasbourg Neudorf (13) | 2–4 | SR Zellwiller (11) |
| 270. | AS Altorf (13) | 4–5 | AS Bergbieten (10) |
| 271. | AS 2000 Strasbourg (12) | 2–5 | FC Rosheim (10) |
| 272. | AS Heiligenstein (11) | 3–2 | ALFC Duttlenheim (9) |
| 273. | USL Duppigheim (9) | 0–1 | AS Haute Bruche (9) |
| 274. | SC Dinsheim (12) | 5–1 | US Innenheim (12) |
| 275. | FC Dangolsheim (11) | 2–2 (1–3 p) | AS Bischoffsheim (9) |
| 276. | Entente Balbronn Westhoffen (12) | 3–0 | AS Natzwiller (12) |
| 277. | CS Fegersheim (10) | 0–0 (4–5 p) | CS Bernardswiller (11) |
| 278. | ES Stotzheim (10) | 5–1 | US Meistratzheim (10) |
| 279. | FC Avolsheim (13) | 0–8 | AS Wisches-Russ-Lutzelhouse (11) |
| 280. | FC Boersch (12) | 1–3 | US Dachstein (10) |
| 281. | AS Niedernai (11) | 1–3 | OC Lipsheim (12) |
| 282. | UJ Epfig (10) | 3–2 | CS Wolxheim (12) |
| 283. | FC Ebersmunster (12) | 0–1 | FC Wittisheim (12) |
| 284. | AS Schœnau (11) | 1–5 | AS Marckolsheim (9) |
| 285. | SC Maisonsgoutte (13) | 1–1 (2–3 p) | Entente Sportive Haslach-Urmatt-Grendelbruch (12) |
| 286. | US Sundhouse (13) | 0–8 | US Hindisheim (10) |
| 287. | FC Kogenheim (13) | 0–7 | US Baldenheim (10) |
| 288. | FC Hilsenheim (13) | 1–1 (4–2 p) | AS Sermersheim (9) |
| 289. | FC Boofzheim (13) | 2–2 (4–5 p) | ASC Saint-Pierre-Bois/Triembach-au-Val (9) |
| 290. | AS Elsenheim (12) | 3–3 (2–4 p) | US Huttenheim (10) |
| 291. | FC Rhinau (9) | 0–5 | SC Sélestat (10) |
| 292. | AS Muttersholtz (13) | 2–3 | FC Bindernheim (10) |
| 293. | US Nordhouse (12) | 2–1 | FC Hipsheim (11) |
| 294. | US Hangenbieten (11) | 2–5 | FC Matzenheim (10) |
| 295. | AS Mussig (10) | 5–0 | RC Kintzheim (10) |
| 296. | AS Châtenois (11) | 2–2 (3–4 p) | FC Kertzfeld (12) |
| 297. | AS Westhouse (13) | 4–0 | AS Sand (13) |
| 298. | FC Rosenau (13) | 4–3 | RC Landser (12) |
| 299. | AS Wittersdorf (12) | 2–1 | AS Schlierbach (11) |
| 300. | FC Steinbrunn-le-Bas (10) | 1–1 (2–3 p) | Alliance Folgensbourg-Muespach-Hausgauen (10) |
| 301. | FC Habsheim (9) | 7–3 | Entente Grentzingen-Bettendorf (10) |
| 302. | RC Dannemarie (9) | 2–2 (5–4 p) | AS Durlinsdorf (10) |
| 303. | AS Mertzen (11) | 1–2 | AS Riespach (11) |
| 304. | AS Hochstatt (10) | 2–2 (3–0 p) | Union Centre Sundgau (10) |
| 305. | Entente Vallée de la Largue (10) | 2–2 (6–5 p) | ASCCO Helfrantzkirch (11) |
| 306. | FC Village Neuf (10) | 0–5 (Note: Entente Hagenbach-Balschwiller penalised, FC Village Neuf qualify. Reason unknown.) | Entente Hagenbach-Balschwiller (10) |
| 307. | FC Illfurth (10) | 2–1 | SS Zillisheim (9) |
| 308. | FC Uffheim (9) | 1–1 (5–6 p) | Entente Oltingue Raedersdorf (9) |
| 309. | AS Guewenheim (11) | 2–5 | US Oberbruck Dolleren (10) |
| 310. | FC Roderen (11) | 3–0 | RC Mulhouse (11) |
| 311. | SR Saint-Amarin (13) | 1–4 | FC Riedisheim (9) |
| 312. | AS Anatolie Mulhouse (9) | 4–3 | FCRS Richwiller (9) |
| 313. | US Azzurri Mulhouse (10) | 2–4 | FC Baldersheim (9) |
| 314. | AS Rixheim (11) | 0–2 | AS Heimsbrunn (10) |
| 315. | FC Masevaux (10) | 0–3 | US Vallée de la Thur (9) |
| 316. | Thann FC 2017 (12) | 4–0 | FC Brunstatt (9) |
| 317. | FC Pfastatt 1926 (9) | 1–1 (2–4 p) | AS Aspach-le-Haut (9) |
| 318. | FC Blue Star Reiningue (11) | 3–0 | US Doller (10) |
| 319. | AS Lutterbach (9) | 1–1 (3–5 p) | Olympique Bourtzwiller Mulhouse (10) |
| 320. | FC Feldkirch (12) | 3–2 | FC Merxheim (10) |
| 321. | US Blodelsheim Bantzenheim (13) | 4–0 | FC Bollwiller (13) |
| 322. | FC Buhl (9) | 2–2 (3–5 p) | FC Ensisheim (10) |
| 323. | ÉS Wihr-au-Val (12) | 1–4 | Entente Elsbourg (11) |
| 324. | FC Réguisheim (10) | 0–3 | US Pulversheim FC (9) |
| 325. | FC Oberhergheim (13) | 0–1 | Cernay FC (10) |
| 326. | AS Rumersheim-le-Haut (12) | 2–1 | FC Ungersheim (9) |
| 327. | US Gunsbach-Zimmerbach (11) | 1–1 (4–1 p) | AS Pfaffenheim (9) |
| 328. | AS Blanc Vieux-Thann (11) | 1–0 | FC Meyenheim (9) |
| 329. | FC Vogelgrun Obersaasheim (11) | 1–2 | FC Soultz 1919 (11) |
| 330. | AS Munster (9) | 1–4 | FC Sainte-Croix-en-Plaine (9) |
| 331. | FC Gundolsheim (11) | 3–1 | AS Vallée Noble (12) |
| 332. | US Artzenheim (12) | 1–4 | US Colmar (10) |
| 333. | US Sainte-Marie-aux-Mines (13) | 1–3 | Avenir Vauban 97 (13) |
| 334. | AS Saint-Hippolyte (13) | 1–6 | FC Heiteren (9) |
| 335. | FC Wettolsheim (11) | 1–5 | FC Bennwihr (9) |
| 336. | CS Sainte-Croix-aux-Mines (12) | 0–3 | FC Niederhergheim (8) |
| 337. | FC Ingersheim (9) | 0–0 (4–5 p) | AS Canton Vert (10) |
| 338. | FC Portugais Colmar (13) | 1–5 | SR Bergheim (10) |
| 339. | FC Bischwihr (13) | 3–0 | FCI Riquewihr (13) |
| 340. | FR Jebsheim-Muntzenheim (10) | 0–4 | SR Widensolen (11) |
| 341. | AS Sigolsheim (12) | 1–3 | AS Andolsheim (10) |
| 342. | SR Kaysersberg (11) | 0–2 | FC Grussenheim (10) |
| 343. | FC Horbourg-Wihr (10) | 2–6 | AS Turckheim (10) |

=== Second round ===
These matches were played on 30 and 31 August 2025.

Second Round Results: Grand Est
| Tie no | Home team (Tier) | Score | Away team (Tier) |
|---|---|---|---|
| 1. | USC Nouvion-sur-Meuse (9) | 0–2 | FC Blagny-Carignan (8) |
| 2. | US Flize (10) | 1–3 | Olympique Torcy-Sedan (8) |
| 3. | QV Douzy (10) | 1–5 | US Bazeilles (8) |
| 4. | Cheveuges-Saint-Aignan CO (9) | 2–2 (4–2 p) | Nord Ardennes (8) |
| 5. | CA Monthermé (11) | 1–2 | AS Tournes/Renwez/Les Mazures/Arreux/Montcornet (8) |
| 6. | AS Boulzicourt (10) | 3–0 | Le Theux FC (11) |
| 7. | Liart-Signy FC (9) | 3–2 | US Fumay-Charnois (10) |
| 8. | ASR Raucourt (10) | 0–9 | USA Le Chesne (8) |
| 9. | ES Charleville-Mézières (9) | 1–3 | CA Villers-Semeuse (7) |
| 10. | AS Lumes (11) | 0–1 | ES Saint-Germainmont (10) |
| 11. | Aubrives FC (11) | 0–3 | FC Rimogne (11) |
| 12. | AS Mouzon (10) | 1–10 | AS Val de l'Aisne (7) |
| 13. | AS Saint-Laurent (12) | 1–4 | AS Asfeld (8) |
| 14. | AS Bourg-Rocroi (8) | 2–1 | US Les Ayvelles (8) |
| 15. | USC Lucquy (11) | 0–2 | FC Porcien (9) |
| 16. | ES Witry-les-Reims (9) | 1–2 | Rethel SF (7) |
| 17. | FC Ferton (12) | 0–7 | Châlons FCO (8) |
| 18. | FC Saint-Martin-sur-le-Pré/La Veuve/Recy (9) | 7–1 | AS Cernay-Berru-Lavannes (8) |
| 19. | FC Vallée de la Suippe (10) | 4–1 | FC Haute Borne (10) |
| 20. | AS Saint-Brice-Courcelles (7) | 6–2 | Vitry FC (7) |
| 21. | Saint-Memmie FC (11) | 1–10 | FCF La Neuvillette-Jamin (7) |
| 22. | Argonne FC (10) | 1–6 | EF Reims Sainte-Anne (7) |
| 23. | US Fismes Ardre et Vesle (10) | 1–3 | Bétheny FC (8) |
| 24. | Nord Champagne FC (9) | 5–2 | FC Côte des Blancs (7) |
| 25. | AS Courtisols ESTAN (10) | 2–0 | OFC Beine-Nauroy (10) |
| 26. | Espérance Rémoise (8) | 1–4 | ASPTT Châlons (8) |
| 27. | FC Morgendois (9) | 1–3 | Reims Murigny Franco Portugais (7) |
| 28. | AS Mourmelon Livry Bouy (10) | 1–2 | FC Tinqueux Champagne (8) |
| 29. | ES Gaye (12) | 0–4 | CS Agéen (9) |
| 30. | ES Muizonnaise (11) | 0–3 | FC Christo (7) |
| 31. | US Couvrot (11) | 0–5 | ES Côteaux Sud (9) |
| 32. | US Avize-Grauves (8) | 3–3 (2–4 p) | SC Sézannais (8) |
| 33. | Étoile Chapelaine (9) | 1–1 (4–1 p) | Saint-André Football (10) |
| 34. | Torvilliers AC (9) | 1–6 | Alliance Sud-Ouest Football Aubois (7) |
| 35. | AS Marigny Saint-Martin (10) | 0–4 | FC Nogentais (7) |
| 36. | FC Bréviandes (10) | 2–2 (1–4 p) | Foyer Barsequanais (8) |
| 37. | AS Chartreux (8) | 5–1 | ES Municipaux Troyes (8) |
| 38. | JS Saint-Julien FC (7) | 4–0 | Bar-sur-Aube FC (8) |
| 39. | UFC Aube (10) | 1–2 | Amicale Saint-Germain (11) |
| 40. | AS Pont-Sainte-Marie (8) | 3–2 | Rosières Omnisports (8) |
| 41. | AS Sud Champagne et Der (10) | 1–1 (9–10 p) | ES Nord Aubois (8) |
| 42. | RCS La Chapelle (7) | 0–0 (4–2 p) (Note: RCS La Chapelle disqualified for an unknown technical infringement. FC Fontaine-Origny-Vallant qualified.) | FC Fontaine-Origny-Vallant (8) |
| 43. | Étoile Lusigny (10) | 2–1 | Romilly Champagne FC (8) |
| 44. | SL Ornel (9) | 4–0 | US Voillecomte (10) |
| 45. | US Montier-en-Der (9) | 5–2 | FC Prez Bourmont (8) |
| 46. | US Ouest 52 (10) | 0–4 | CO Langres (10) |
| 47. | SR Neuilly-l'Évêque (9) | 0–1 | AF Valcourt (10) |
| 48. | ES Andelot-Rimaucourt-Bourdons (8) | 2–1 | AS Sarrey-Montigny (8) |
| 49. | FCCS Bragard (10) | 1–0 | Entente Colombey Maranville Rennepont (10) |
| 50. | FC Joinville-Vecqueville (9) | 3–5 | FC Saints-Geosmois (8) |
| 51. | Espérance Saint-Dizier (10) | 1–4 | Stade Chevillonnais (7) |
| 52. | CS Doulaincourt-Saucourt (11) | 0–4 | USI Blaise (8) |
| 53. | US Rouvres Auberive (10) | 1–3 | US Éclaron (8) |
| 54. | FC Bologne (9) | 1–1 (5–4 p) | DS Eurville-Bienville (8) |
| 55. | FC Sud Champagne (9) | 2–2 (4–3 p) | US Bourbonnaise (10) |
| 56. | AS Plombières (10) | 1–2 | ES Laneuveville (7) |
| 57. | AS Saint-Nabord (9) | 3–2 | AS Girancourt-Dommartin-Chaumousey (8) |
| 58. | FC Thaon City (11) | 0–0 (2–4 p) | EFC Épinal (11) |
| 59. | CS Charmes (9) | 2–4 | FC Le Tholy (10) |
| 60. | FC Saint-Amé Julienrupt (10) | 1–4 | FC Dommartin-lès-Remiremont (9) |
| 61. | ASL Coussey-Greux (10) | 0–4 | AS Nomexy-Vincey-Moriville (9) |
| 62. | US Rosières-aux-Salines (9) | 2–4 | AC Blainville-Damelevières (8) |
| 63. | FR Thiaville (11) | 1–6 | FC Dombasle-sur-Meurthe (9) |
| 64. | AS La Chapelle-aux-Bois (11) | 0–10 | ES Heillecourt (7) |
| 65. | AS Padoux (10) | 1–3 | FC Pont-Saint-Vincent (10) |
| 66. | SC Baccarat (9) | 2–1 | ES Avière Darnieulles (8) |
| 67. | US Arches-Archettes-Raon (10) | 3–2 | Espérance Gerbéviller (10) |
| 68. | AS Ludres (8) | 0–2 | US Vandœuvre (7) |
| 69. | US Jolivet (11) | 0–0 (4–5 p) | SM Taintrux (9) |
| 70. | Dogneville FC (11) | 3–4 | AS Laneuveville Marainviller (9) |
| 71. | FC Remiremont Saint-Étienne (10) | 0–1 | FC Neufchâteau-Liffol (8) |
| 72. | AS Gérardmer (8) | 1–5 | FC Éloyes (7) |
| 73. | US Mirecourt-Hymont (11) | 1–2 | Bulgnéville Contrex Vittel FC (8) |
| 74. | SM Etival (10) | 2–3 | AS Ramonchamp (9) |
| 75. | FC Hadol-Dounoux-Uriménil (9) | 2–0 | AS Vagney (9) |
| 76. | FC Saint-Maurice Fresse (10) | 2–7 | FC Sainte-Marguerite (8) |
| 77. | FC Darney Val de Saône (10) | 2–3 | GS Haroué-Benney (7) |
| 78. | FC Revigny (10) | 1–3 | GS Vézelise (10) |
| 79. | AS Colombey (10) | 2–1 | AS Gondrevilley (8) |
| 80. | FC Houdemont (9) | 0–0 (4–3 p) | Entente Centre Ornain (7) |
| 81. | AS Velaine-en-Haye (10) | 1–2 | CS Blénod (7) |
| 82. | ASC Saulxures-lès-Nancy (10) | 1–1 (5–4 p) | SC Commercy (10) |
| 83. | FC Fains-Véel (10) | 1–1 (3–4 p) | FC Nurhak (9) |
| 84. | AS Art-sur-Meuthe Bosserville Lenoncourt (10) | 2–5 | GSA Tomblaine (8) |
| 85. | FC Saint-Max-Essey (8) | 3–2 | AS Tréveray (8) |
| 86. | Stade Flévillois (9) | 1–0 | AS Lay-Saint-Christophe/Bouxieres-aux-Dames (8) |
| 87. | Lorraine Vaucouleurs (9) | 0–2 | FC Écrouves (9) |
| 88. | Olympique Haussonville (11) | 1–6 | ENJ Val-de-Seille (8) |
| 89. | FC Dieulouard Marbache Belleville (8) | 2–1 | FC Toul (9) |
| 90. | Bar-le-Duc FC (7) | 5–1 | RC Champigneulles (7) |
| 91. | Nancy FC (9) | 0–3 | Entente Sorcy Void-Vacon (7) |
| 92. | AS Haut-du-Lièvre Nancy (8) | 7–2 | ES Custines-Malleloy (9) |
| 93. | AJSE Montauville (9) | 1–1 (4–3 p) (Note: Tie reversed from original draw.) | Maxéville FC (10) |
| 94. | USI Jaillon (11) | 2–2 (4–5 p) | US Behonne-Longeville-en-Barois (7) |
| 95. | Toul JCA (9) | 0–2 | FC Pulnoy (8) |
| 96. | FC Dugny (9) | 0–0 (3–4 p) | Athletic Cuvry Augny (8) |
| 97. | FC Mondelange (11) | 0–1 | ES Metz (9) |
| 98. | AF Metz Arsenal (12) | 0–4 | US Châtel Conquistadors (7) |
| 99. | US Briey (8) | 0–2 | AS Montigny-lès-Metz (7) |
| 100. | AS Metz Porto (11) | 0–10 | AS Les Côteaux (8) |
| 101. | US Avrilloise (12) | 0–3 | SC Marly (9) |
| 102. | ASP Sainte-Marie-aux-Chênes (11) | 0–4 | ESAP Metz (8) |
| 103. | US Ban-Saint-Martin (11) | 1–1 (1–4 p) | AS Clouange (8) |
| 104. | Association Saint-Laurent-Mangiennes (10) | 4–7 | Entente Gravelotte-Verneville (10) |
| 105. | US Conflans Doncourt (10) | 2–2 (4–3 p) | CO Metz Bellecroix (10) |
| 106. | JSO Ennery (10) | 3–0 | La Lyre Sportive Vantoux (11) |
| 107. | FC Pierrevillers (10) | 0–1 | Fleury FC (8) |
| 108. | CS Bassin Ornais (9) | 0–6 | US Etain-Buzy (7) |
| 109. | FC Belleray (10) | 0–2 | AS Sainte-Barbe Sanry Méchy (10) |
| 110. | Entente Vigneulles-Hannonville-Fresne (9) | 0–3 | FC Verny-Louvigny-Cuvry (8) |
| 111. | SF Verdun Belleville (8) | 1–3 | RS Amanvillers (7) |
| 112. | SC Moulins-lès-Metz (10) | 3–6 | RS Magny (7) |
| 113. | FC Loisy (11) | 0–4 | ES Marange-Silvange (8) |
| 114. | US Ancy-Corny-Jouy (10) | 2–2 (4–5 p) | US Jarny (8) |
| 115. | FC Magny (11) | 4–2 | FC Woippy (10) |
| 116. | SC Les Islettes (10) | 0–5 | JS Metz Scy-Chazelles (9) |
| 117. | US Argancy (10) | 0–3 | UL Plantières Metz (7) |
| 118. | TS Bertrange (9) | 2–4 | FC Devant-les-Ponts Metz (8) |
| 119. | UL Rombas (9) | 1–4 | Val de l'Orne FC (7) |
| 120. | RC Crusnes Audun (9) | 0–3 | AS Saulnes Longlaville (8) |
| 121. | CO Bouzonville (9) | 1–0 | ASC Basse-Ham (10) |
| 122. | RS Ottange-Nondkeil (11) | 0–4 | FC Vœlfling (10) |
| 123. | ES Gandrange (8) | 0–2 | US Yutz (8) |
| 124. | Union Saint-Jean Montmédy (10) | 1–1 (1–3 p) | FC Bassin Piennois (8) |
| 125. | JS Rettel Hunting Contz (11) | 1–0 | RS Kœnigsmacker (12) |
| 126. | CS Volmerange-les-Mines (10) | 3–2 | USB Longwy (8) |
| 127. | AS Konacker (11) | 3–0 | ES Longuyon (8) |
| 128. | US Fontoy (10) | 0–7 | FC Hayange (9) |
| 129. | ES Kœnigsmacker-Kédange (9) | 1–3 | ES Fameck (7) |
| 130. | AS Entrange (11) | 1–8 | AS Algrange (7) |
| 131. | AG Metzervisse (8) | 3–0 | AS Talange (8) |
| 132. | FC Mexy (10) | 2–3 | CS Godbrange (9) |
| 133. | CS Veymerange (7) | 1–1 (5–6 p) | SC Terville (8) |
| 134. | US Florange-Ebange (10) | 0–5 | JS Audunoise (8) |
| 135. | JS Distroff (11) | 0–5 | FC Yutz (7) |
| 136. | FC Hagondange (7) | 0–0 (6–5 p) | FC Trémery (8) |
| 137. | US Trois Frontières (9) | 4–2 | Entente Bure-Boulange (9) |
| 138. | ES Rosselange Vitry (7) | 2–1 | US Illange (8) |
| 139. | AS Anzeling Edling (11) | 3–2 | ASJA Saint-Avold (10) |
| 140. | AS Hellimer (10) | 4–1 | FC Francaltroff (11) |
| 141. | CS Diebling (12) | 1–3 | FC Farschviller (10) |
| 142. | SR Creutzwald 03 (8) | 2–1 | US Alsting-Spicheren (8) |
| 143. | ES Macheren Petit-Ebersviller (9) | 3–2 | ES Petite-Rosselle (10) |
| 144. | ES Lixing Vahl Laning (10) | 2–0 | US Morsbach (10) |
| 145. | AS Grostenquin Bérig Bistroff (10) | 0–1 | FC Hochwald (8) |
| 146. | FC Coume (9) | 1–4 | CA Boulay (7) |
| 147. | FC Éblange (11) | 0–1 | US Farébersviller 05 (8) |
| 148. | SO Ippling (10) | 0–1 | FC Longeville-lès-Saint-Avold (8) |
| 149. | FC Freyming (7) | 5–0 | US Valmont (8) |
| 150. | AS Freybouse-Frémestroff (10) | 2–0 | AS Lixing-lès-Rouhling (11) |
| 151. | Flétrange SA (10) | 2–6 | Étoile Naborienne Saint-Avold (7) |
| 152. | FC Dannelbourg (10) | 0–5 | AS Réding (8) |
| 153. | SR Langatte (11) | 0–8 | AS Morhange (7) |
| 154. | Sportive Lorquinoise (9) | 3–0 | AS Bettborn Hellering (9) |
| 155. | ES Avricourt Moussey (9) | 2–5 | FC Sarrebourg (7) |
| 156. | Olympique Mittelbronn 04 (10) | 2–2 (5–4 p) | JF Vergaville (11) |
| 157. | FC Château-Salins (9) | 1–3 | EFT Sarrebourg (9) |
| 158. | FC Dieuze (10) | 0–1 | SS Hilbesheim (10) |
| 159. | Montagnarde Walscheid (9) | 4–0 | USF Brouderdorff (10) |
| 160. | Entente Neufgrange-Siltzheim (10) | 1–0 | SF Enchenberg (10) |
| 161. | US Behren-lès-Forbach (9) | 6–0 | ES Wies-Woelf 93 (10) |
| 162. | AS Rech (11) | 0–2 | AS Bliesbruck (9) |
| 163. | FC Metzing (8) | 3–1 | Union Soucht Goetzenbruck Meisenthal 2022 (9) |
| 164. | AS Neunkirch (9) | 0–6 | US Nousseviller (7) |
| 165. | Entente Schorbach Hottviller Volmunster 13 (11) | 0–7 | ES Rimling-Erching-Obergailbach (9) |
| 166. | FC Rohrbach Bining (9) | 6–1 | FC Bitche (10) |
| 167. | FC Hambach (9) | 1–5 | AS Montbronn (8) |
| 168. | Achen-Etting-Schmittviller (7) | 1–5 | SO Merlebach (7) |
| 169. | US Gumbrechtshoffen (12) | 0–6 | US Turcs Bischwiller (9) |
| 170. | AS Uhrwiller (9) | 3–0 | FR Sessenheim-Stattmatten (9) |
| 171. | AS Saint-Étienne Salmbach (13) | 0–4 | FC Steinseltz (8) |
| 172. | US Schleithal (8) | 3–0 | US Kaltenhouse-Marienthal (8) |
| 173. | FR Schœnenbourg-Memmelshoffen (13) | 0–5 | FC Saint-Etienne Seltz (7) |
| 174. | FA Val de Moder (9) | 0–1 | AS Ohlungen (7) |
| 175. | FC Niederlauterbach (10) | 0–1 | US Preuschdorf-Langensoultzbach (8) |
| 176. | AS Platania Gundershoffen (9) | 0–4 | US Oberlauterbach (7) |
| 177. | AC Hinterfeld (11) | 0–5 | FC Scheibenhard (7) |
| 178. | FC Eschbach (11) | 1–3 | FC Mothern (9) |
| 179. | SR Rountzenheim-Auenheim (12) | 2–1 | FC Herrlisheim (10) |
| 180. | AS Gambsheim (9) | 5–2 | AS Hunspach (8) |
| 181. | FC Riedseltz (10) | 0–2 | AS Seebach (10) |
| 182. | Entente Wissembourg/Altenstadt (13) | 0–3 | SC Rœschwoog (9) |
| 183. | ASL Duntzenheim (11) | 2–4 | SC Drulingen (8) |
| 184. | FC Schaffhouse-sur-Zorn (10) | 0–4 | ASL Robertsau (7) |
| 185. | FC Dossenheim-sur-Zinsel (9) | 2–0 | FC Kindwiller (10) |
| 186. | US Mommenheim (13) | 0–7 | AS Hochfelden (8) |
| 187. | Entente Mackwiller-Waldhambach (12) | 0–13 | FC Schweighouse-sur-Moder (8) |
| 188. | AS Pfulgriesheim (9) | 0–3 | ASI Avenir (7) |
| 189. | AS Weinbourg (10) | 1–2 | AS Ingwiller/Menchhoffen (7) |
| 190. | Entente de la Mossig Wasselonne/Romanswiller (11) | 0–2 | FC Saverne (8) |
| 191. | FCE Reichshoffen (13) | 4–0 | US Imbsheim (11) |
| 192. | Entente Wœrth Morsbronn (13) | 1–5 | US Ettendorf (9) |
| 193. | SC Dettwiller (11) | 2–2 (5–4 p) | AS Lupstein (10) |
| 194. | CSIE Harskirchen (10) | 0–3 | AS Butten-Diemeringen (8) |
| 195. | FC Monswiller (12) | 2–1 | AS Hohengœft (10) |
| 196. | ES Wolfisheim (13) | 1–6 | AS Hoerdt (7) |
| 197. | FC Ostwald (10) | 1–4 | ÉS Pfettisheim (11) |
| 198. | AS Espagnols Schiltigheim (13) | 1–9 | AS Holtzheim (9) |
| 199. | FC Wingersheim (8) | 5–3 | FC Truchtersheim (8) |
| 200. | AS Musau Strasbourg (10) | 0–2 | FC Ecrivains-Schiltigheim-Bischheim (10) |
| 201. | FC Gries (12) | 5–0 | AS Willgottheim (11) |
| 202. | SS Brumath (9) | 2–2 (5–4 p) | US Wittersheim (8) |
| 203. | CS Neuhof Strasbourg (10) | 1–1 (4–3 p) | FC Eckbolsheim (8) |
| 204. | La Wantzenau FC (10) | 1–2 | AS Strasbourg (9) |
| 205. | FC Souffelweyersheim (11) | 2–4 | FC Drusenheim (7) |
| 206. | FC Stutzheim-Offenheim (13) | 1–1 (6–7 p) | FC Weitbruch (9) |
| 207. | US Ittenheim (8) | 1–0 | US Oberschaeffolsheim (8) |
| 208. | EB Achenheim (9) | 0–3 | FC Kronenbourg Strasbourg (7) |
| 209. | AS Bergbieten (10) | 2–2 (8–9 p) | FC Rosheim (10) |
| 210. | OC Lipsheim (12) | 1–2 | FC Soleil Bischheim (8) |
| 211. | CA Plobsheim (11) | 1–2 | AP Joie et Santé Strasbourg (8) |
| 212. | SC Dinsheim (12) | 2–3 | US Dachstein (10) |
| 213. | AS Westhouse (13) | 1–6 | FC Breuschwickersheim (11) |
| 214. | ES Stotzheim (10) | 0–4 | FC Dahlenheim (7) |
| 215. | FC Eschau (8) | 5–0 | ES Molsheim-Ernolsheim (8) |
| 216. | AS Bischoffsheim (9) | 0–3 | SR Hoenheim (9) |
| 217. | AS Haute Bruche (9) | 1–1 (4–5 p) | AS Elsau Portugais Strasbourg (8) |
| 218. | Strasbourg Université Club (9) | 3–3 (4–5 p) | UJ Epfig (10) |
| 219. | AS Menora Strasbourg (7) | 0–3 | FC Geispolsheim 01 (7) |
| 220. | AS Wisches-Russ-Lutzelhouse (11) | 0–0 (4–3 p) | AS Neudorf (8) |
| 221. | Entente Balbronn Westhoffen (12) | 1–2 | Erno FC (11) |
| 222. | SC Sélestat (10) | 7–1 | AS Portugais Sélestat (8) |
| 223. | FCSR Obernai (7) | 2–3 | FC Illhaeusern (7) |
| 224. | US Hindisheim (10) | 2–3 | AS Ribeauvillé (8) |
| 225. | FC Kertzfeld (12) | 0–3 | FC Matzenheim (10) |
| 226. | US Nordhouse (12) | 0–3 | FC Rossfeld (8) |
| 227. | ASC Saint-Pierre-Bois/Triembach-au-Val (9) | 1–5 | AS Berrwiller-Hartsmannswiller (8) |
| 228. | AS Marckolsheim (9) | 1–0 | FC Bindernheim (10) |
| 229. | US Huttenheim (10) | 2–3 | AS Erstein (7) |
| 230. | FC Hilsenheim (13) | 2–1 | CS Bernardswiller (11) |
| 231. | AS Mussig (10) | 0–2 | US Scherwiller (7) |
| 232. | FC Wittisheim (12) | 5–2 | Entente Sportive Haslach-Urmatt-Grendelbruch (12) |
| 233. | SR Zellwiller (11) | 1–5 | AGIIR Florival (8) |
| 234. | US Baldenheim (10) | 1–5 | FC Rouffach (8) |
| 235. | AS Heiligenstein (11) | 0–7 | AS Guémar (8) |
| 236. | AS Aspach-le-Haut (9) | 2–1 | US Hésingue (8) |
| 237. | AS Wittersdorf (12) | 1–1 (1–3 p) | FC Village Neuf (10) |
| 238. | Thann FC 2017 (12) | 2–1 | Entente Vallée de la Largue (10) |
| 239. | FC Illfurth (10) | 2–4 | FC Sierentz-Kappelen (8) |
| 240. | AS Anatolie Mulhouse (9) | 1–0 | FC Morschwiller-le-Bas (8) |
| 241. | FC Blue Star Reiningue (11) | 0–3 | FC Roderen (11) |
| 242. | ASCA Wittelsheim (8) | 1–1 (3–5 p) | Stade Burnhauptois (8) |
| 243. | Olympique Bourtzwiller Mulhouse (10) | 2–5 | RC Dannemarie (9) |
| 244. | FC Habsheim (9) | 0–7 | AS Huningue (7) |
| 245. | FC Baldersheim (9) | 4–3 | US Hirsingue (8) |
| 246. | Alliance Folgensbourg-Muespach-Hausgauen (10) | 0–9 | FC Saint-Louis Neuweg (7) |
| 247. | AS Riespach (11) | 1–4 | US Oberbruck Dolleren (10) |
| 248. | FC Rosenau (13) | 1–3 | AS Hochstatt (10) |
| 249. | Entente Oltingue Raedersdorf (9) | 2–4 | SC Ottmarsheim (7) |
| 250. | AS Coteaux Mulhouse (8) | 3–4 | FC Bartenheim (7) |
| 251. | FC Hégenheim (8) | 1–2 | AS Blotzheim (7) |
| 252. | US Vallée de la Thur (9) | 3–1 | FC Hagenthal-Wentzwiller (8) |
| 253. | FC Riedisheim (9) | 3–0 | AS Theodore Ruelisheim Wittenheim (8) |
| 254. | AS Heimsbrunn (10) | 0–1 | Mouloudia Mulhouse (8) |
| 255. | FC Bischwihr (13) | 0–15 | US Pulversheim FC (9) |
| 256. | Entente Elsbourg (11) | 6–2 | AS Rumersheim-le-Haut (12) |
| 257. | FC Grussenheim (10) | 0–0 (2–4 p) | FC Soultz 1919 (11) |
| 258. | SR Widensolen (11) | 0–15 | Racing HW 96 (7) |
| 259. | US Colmar (10) | 1–3 | FC Wintzfelden-Osenbach (8) |
| 260. | FC Feldkirch (12) | 4–1 | Cernay FC (10) |
| 261. | Avenir Vauban 97 (13) | 1–12 | AS Canton Vert (10) |
| 262. | FC Ensisheim (10) | 5–2 | FC Niederhergheim (8) |
| 263. | US Gunsbach-Zimmerbach (11) | 0–0 (4–5 p) | FC Heiteren (9) |
| 264. | FC Sainte-Croix-en-Plaine (9) | 0–2 | FC Sausheim (8) |
| 265. | FC Hirtzfelden (8) | 3–3 (5–4 p) | FC Pays Rhénan (8) |
| 266. | FC Fessenheim (8) | 1–6 | US Wittenheim (7) |
| 267. | AS Andolsheim (10) | 1–5 | SR Bergheim (10) |
| 268. | AS Blanc Vieux-Thann (11) | 7–1 | AS Turckheim (10) |
| 269. | US Blodelsheim Bantzenheim (13) | 0–6 | FC Munchhouse (8) |
| 270. | FC Gundolsheim (11) | 4–3 | AS Raedersheim (8) |
| 271. | FC Bennwihr (9) | 1–1 (4–3 p) | FC Kingersheim (7) |

=== Third round ===
These matches were played on 13 and 14 September 2025.

Third Round Results: Grand Est
| Tie no | Home team (Tier) | Score | Away team (Tier) |
|---|---|---|---|
| 1. | FC Blagny-Carignan (8) | 0–3 | EF Reims Sainte-Anne (7) |
| 2. | Olympique Charleville Prix Ardenne Métropole (5) | 3–0 | CS Sedan Ardennes (6) |
| 3. | FC Rimogne (11) | 0–7 | CA Villers-Semeuse (7) |
| 4. | USA Le Chesne (8) | 5–3 | AS Bourg-Rocroi (8) |
| 5. | AS Val de l'Aisne (7) | 0–1 | FCF La Neuvillette-Jamin (7) |
| 6. | FC Porcien (9) | 1–1 (3–2 p) | Cheveuges-Saint-Aignan CO (9) |
| 7. | AS Tournes/Renwez/Les Mazures/Arreux/Montcornet (8) | 3–0 | AS Asfeld (8) |
| 8. | Olympique Torcy-Sedan (8) | 2–0 | Liart-Signy FC (9) |
| 9. | ES Saint-Germainmont (10) | 1–0 | FC Vallée de la Suippe (10) |
| 10. | US Bazeilles (8) | 2–3 | Rethel SF (7) |
| 11. | AS Boulzicourt (10) | 0–0 (2–4 p) | FC Bogny (6) |
| 12. | CS Agéen (9) | 3–4 | FC Saint-Meziery (6) |
| 13. | ES Côteaux Sud (9) | 1–0 | Étoile Chapelaine (9) |
| 14. | Châlons FCO (8) | 2–3 | FC Christo (7) |
| 15. | FC Tinqueux Champagne (8) | 0–3 | RC Épernay Champagne (6) |
| 16. | ASPTT Châlons (8) | 1–4 | Cormontreuil FC (6) |
| 17. | SC Sézannais (8) | – (Note: Match abandoned by the referee after 83 minutes with the scoreline 3–0, due to violence between players and fans. Bétheny FC penalised, SC Sézannais qualified.) | Bétheny FC (8) |
| 18. | AS Courtisols ESTAN (10) | 0–2 | FC Nogentais (7) |
| 19. | AS Saint-Brice-Courcelles (7) | 5–0 | ES Fagnières (6) |
| 20. | Reims Murigny Franco Portugais (7) | 1–0 | Alliance Sud-Ouest Football Aubois (7) |
| 21. | FC Saint-Martin-sur-le-Pré/La Veuve/Recy (9) | 3–0 | Nord Champagne FC (9) |
| 22. | Amicale Saint-Germain (11) | 1–1 (3–4 p) | AS Chartreux (8) |
| 23. | FCCS Bragard (10) | 2–2 (8–7 p) | Foyer Barsequanais (8) |
| 24. | US Montier-en-Der (9) | 3–5 | Stade Chevillonnais (7) |
| 25. | Étoile Lusigny (10) | 2–4 | FC Fontaine-Origny-Vallant (8) |
| 26. | US Éclaron (8) | 4–1 | FC Sud Champagne (9) |
| 27. | ES Nord Aubois (8) | 1–4 | AS Pont-Sainte-Marie (8) |
| 28. | SL Ornel (9) | 0–5 | SC Marnaval (6) |
| 29. | AF Valcourt (10) | 1–3 | Chaumont FC (6) |
| 30. | CO Langres (10) | 8–1 | ES Andelot-Rimaucourt-Bourdons (8) |
| 31. | USI Blaise (8) | 2–2 (11–10 p) | FC Bologne (9) |
| 32. | FC Saints-Geosmois (8) | 0–3 | JS Saint-Julien FC (7) |
| 33. | FC Sainte-Marguerite (8) | 0–9 | SR Saint-Dié (6) |
| 34. | US Raon-l'Étape (6) | 1–1 (5–3 p) | ES Thaon (5) |
| 35. | EFC Épinal (11) | 0–6 | ES Golbey (6) |
| 36. | Bulgnéville Contrex Vittel FC (8) | 3–0 | AS Saint-Nabord (9) |
| 37. | FC Pont-Saint-Vincent (10) | 1–1 (2–1 p) | US Arches-Archettes-Raon (10) |
| 38. | AS Nomexy-Vincey-Moriville (9) | 3–2 | ES Heillecourt (7) |
| 39. | ES Laneuveville (7) | 2–3 | AC Blainville-Damelevières (8) |
| 40. | AS Ramonchamp (9) | 1–1 (3–2 p) | SM Taintrux (9) |
| 41. | FC Dommartin-lès-Remiremont (9) | 0–2 | FC Éloyes (7) |
| 42. | FC Le Tholy (10) | 1–2 | SC Baccarat (9) |
| 43. | FC Neufchâteau-Liffol (8) | 0–4 | FC Hadol-Dounoux-Uriménil (9) |
| 44. | AS Laneuveville Marainviller (9) | 2–2 (2–3 p) | GS Haroué-Benney (7) |
| 45. | FC Écrouves (9) | 4–0 | ASC Saulxures-lès-Nancy (10) |
| 46. | CS Blénod (7) | 1–3 | GS Neuves-Maisons (6) |
| 47. | Entente Sorcy Void-Vacon (7) | 4–2 | AS Haut-du-Lièvre Nancy (8) |
| 48. | FC Pulnoy (8) | 2–2 (1–3 p) | Bar-le-Duc FC (7) |
| 49. | GSA Tomblaine (8) | 3–2 | FC Dieulouard Marbache Belleville (8) |
| 50. | Jarville JF (6) | 2–0 | COS Villers (6) |
| 51. | FC Dombasle-sur-Meurthe (9) | 2–1 | AS Colombey (10) |
| 52. | US Behonne-Longeville-en-Barois (7) | 1–5 | ENJ Val-de-Seille (8) |
| 53. | FC Nurhak (9) | 0–4 | FC Lunéville (6) |
| 54. | AJSE Montauville (9) | 1–5 | FC Houdemont (9) |
| 55. | GS Vézelise (10) | 0–2 | FC Saint-Max-Essey (8) |
| 56. | Stade Flévillois (9) | 1–6 | US Vandœuvre (7) |
| 57. | Entente Gravelotte-Verneville (10) | 2–0 | AS Sainte-Barbe Sanry Méchy (10) |
| 58. | RS Amanvillers (7) | 2–1 | FC Verny-Louvigny-Cuvry (8) |
| 59. | US Conflans Doncourt (10) | 0–0 (3–5 p) | US Jarny (8) |
| 60. | Val de l'Orne FC (7) | 3–0 | FC Devant-les-Ponts Metz (8) |
| 61. | Athletic Cuvry Augny (8) | 0–8 | APM Metz (6) |
| 62. | SC Marly (9) | 2–4 | AS Montigny-lès-Metz (7) |
| 63. | JSO Ennery (10) | 0–2 | AS Pagny-sur-Moselle (6) |
| 64. | RS Magny (7) | 0–2 | US Etain-Buzy (7) |
| 65. | ESAP Metz (8) | 5–1 | JS Metz Scy-Chazelles (9) |
| 66. | Fleury FC (8) | 3–1 | AS Clouange (8) |
| 67. | AS Les Côteaux (8) | 1–5 | US Châtel Conquistadors (7) |
| 68. | FC Magny (11) | 2–1 | ES Metz (9) |
| 69. | FC Vœlfling (10) | 3–3 (8–9 p) | FC Bassin Piennois (8) |
| 70. | ES Marange-Silvange (8) | 1–1 (5–4 p) | US Yutz (8) |
| 71. | JS Audunoise (8) | 1–1 (5–4 p) | ES Fameck (7) |
| 72. | FC Hayange (9) | 0–1 | UL Plantières Metz (7) |
| 73. | AS Algrange (7) | 2–1 | CSO Amnéville (6) |
| 74. | AS Saulnes Longlaville (8) | 2–2 (3–1 p) | FC Hagondange (7) |
| 75. | JS Rettel Hunting Contz (11) | 1–6 | ES Rosselange Vitry (7) |
| 76. | CS Godbrange (9) | 2–1 | US Trois Frontières (9) |
| 77. | AS Konacker (11) | 0–5 | FC Hettange-Grande (6) |
| 78. | AG Metzervisse (8) | 3–1 | CO Bouzonville (9) |
| 79. | FC Yutz (7) | 1–3 | ES Villerupt-Thil (6) |
| 80. | SC Terville (8) | 8–0 (Note: Tie reversed from original draw.) | CS Volmerange-les-Mines (10) |
| 81. | AS Hellimer (10) | 1–0 | FC Longeville-lès-Saint-Avold (8) |
| 82. | FC Farschviller (10) | 2–3 | FC Hochwald (8) |
| 83. | AS Réding (8) | 2–1 | SO Merlebach (7) |
| 84. | ES Lixing Vahl Laning (10) | 1–9 | Sarreguemines FC (6) |
| 85. | EFT Sarrebourg (9) | 4–2 | SR Creutzwald 03 (8) |
| 86. | SS Hilbesheim (10) | 3–3 (4–1 p) | AS Morhange (7) |
| 87. | AS Montbronn (8) | 5–2 | Montagnarde Walscheid (9) |
| 88. | AS Freybouse-Frémestroff (10) | 0–8 | US Farébersviller 05 (8) |
| 89. | US Behren-lès-Forbach (9) | 0–4 | CA Boulay (7) |
| 90. | FC Metzing (8) | 0–2 | US Forbach (6) |
| 91. | US Nousseviller (7) | 0–0 (3–2 p) | Étoile Naborienne Saint-Avold (7) |
| 92. | AS Bliesbruck (9) | 0–3 | ES Macheren Petit-Ebersviller (9) |
| 93. | AS Anzeling Edling (11) | 3–3 (2–3 p) | Entente Neufgrange-Siltzheim (10) |
| 94. | Olympique Mittelbronn 04 (10) | 0–9 | USAG Uckange (6) |
| 95. | Sportive Lorquinoise (9) | 0–5 | FC Freyming (7) |
| 96. | ES Rimling-Erching-Obergailbach (9) | 1–0 | FC Sarrebourg (7) |
| 97. | FC Gries (12) | 0–2 | FC Weitbruch (9) |
| 98. | US Oberlauterbach (7) | 3–0 | US Reipertswiller (6) |
| 99. | US Turcs Bischwiller (9) | 0–2 | FCE Schirrhein (6) |
| 100. | AS Gambsheim (9) | 2–1 | FC Saint-Etienne Seltz (7) |
| 101. | AS Strasbourg (9) | 0–1 | FC Scheibenhard (7) |
| 102. | SR Rountzenheim-Auenheim (12) | 0–2 | AS Uhrwiller (9) |
| 103. | US Preuschdorf-Langensoultzbach (8) | 2–6 | SS Weyersheim (6) |
| 104. | SC Rœschwoog (9) | 0–2 | US Schleithal (8) |
| 105. | FC Steinseltz (8) | 1–1 (4–5 p) | FC Drusenheim (7) |
| 106. | FC Mothern (9) | 5–1 | AS Seebach (10) |
| 107. | SC Dettwiller (11) | 1–7 | ASL Robertsau (7) |
| 108. | FC Schweighouse-sur-Moder (8) | 2–3 | FC Obermodern (6) |
| 109. | FCE Reichshoffen (13) | 5–0 | FC Dossenheim-sur-Zinsel (9) |
| 110. | SC Drulingen (8) | 0–7 | US Ettendorf (9) |
| 111. | ÉS Pfettisheim (11) | 0–5 | AS Ohlungen (7) |
| 112. | AS Hochfelden (8) | 2–2 (5–4 p) | FC Rohrbach Bining (9) |
| 113. | FC Monswiller (12) | 0–7 | US Sarre-Union (6) |
| 114. | FC Saverne (8) | 2–2 (5–4 p) | FC Wingersheim (8) |
| 115. | ASI Avenir (7) | 1–2 | AS Butten-Diemeringen (8) |
| 116. | SS Brumath (9) | 1–2 | AS Ingwiller/Menchhoffen (7) |
| 117. | FC Eschau (8) | 1–3 | FA Illkirch Graffenstaden (6) |
| 118. | FC Rosheim (10) | 2–0 | Erno FC (11) |
| 119. | AS Elsau Portugais Strasbourg (8) | 1–4 | FC Kronenbourg Strasbourg (7) |
| 120. | UJ Epfig (10) | 3–3 (5–4 p) | AS Wisches-Russ-Lutzelhouse (11) |
| 121. | FC Soleil Bischheim (8) | 1–2 | SR Hoenheim (9) |
| 122. | US Dachstein (10) | 0–10 | SC Schiltigheim (6) |
| 123. | FC Geispolsheim 01 (7) | 4–2 | FC Dahlenheim (7) |
| 124. | AS Holtzheim (9) | 0–4 | Association Still-Mutzig (6) |
| 125. | FC Breuschwickersheim (11) | 1–3 | AS Hoerdt (7) |
| 126. | FC Ecrivains-Schiltigheim-Bischheim (10) | 1–6 | US Ittenheim (8) |
| 127. | AP Joie et Santé Strasbourg (8) | 3–0 | AS Marckolsheim (9) |
| 128. | AS Berrwiller-Hartsmannswiller (8) | 0–1 | FC Bennwihr (9) |
| 129. | FC Matzenheim (10) | 0–0 (3–4 p) | FC Rossfeld (8) |
| 130. | CS Neuhof Strasbourg (10) | 0–2 | FC Illhaeusern (7) |
| 131. | FC Wittisheim (12) | 0–6 | FC Mulhouse (5) |
| 132. | FC Rouffach (8) | 2–3 | AGIIR Florival (8) |
| 133. | FC Hilsenheim (13) | 1–3 | AS Ribeauvillé (8) |
| 134. | SC Sélestat (10) | 2–3 | FCO Strasbourg Koenigshoffen 06 (6) |
| 135. | AS Erstein (7) | 2–2 (5–4 p) | US Scherwiller (7) |
| 136. | FC Soultz 1919 (11) | 2–1 | RC Dannemarie (9) |
| 137. | AS Hochstatt (10) | 0–3 | AS Aspach-le-Haut (9) |
| 138. | Thann FC 2017 (12) | 0–21 | AS Illzach Modenheim (6) |
| 139. | FC Sierentz-Kappelen (8) | 1–0 | SC Ottmarsheim (7) |
| 140. | FC Bartenheim (7) | 5–1 | FC Wintzfelden-Osenbach (8) |
| 141. | Mouloudia Mulhouse (8) | 2–4 | AS Blotzheim (7) |
| 142. | AS Guémar (8) | 0–1 | Stade Burnhauptois (8) |
| 143. | FC Baldersheim (9) | 2–3 | Mulhouse Foot Réunis (6) |
| 144. | FC Gundolsheim (11) | 0–0 (2–3 p) | FC Roderen (11) |
| 145. | FC Village Neuf (10) | 0–8 | FC Riedisheim (9) |
| 146. | US Vallée de la Thur (9) | 2–3 | ASL Kœtzingue (6) |
| 147. | AS Huningue (7) | 2–2 (1–3 p) | FC Hirtzfelden (8) |
| 148. | Entente Elsbourg (11) | 0–4 | US Wittenheim (7) |
| 149. | FC Feldkirch (12) | 2–10 | FC Ensisheim (10) |
| 150. | AS Anatolie Mulhouse (9) | 3–2 | Racing HW 96 (7) |
| 151. | SR Bergheim (10) | 1–1 (5–6 p) | AS Blanc Vieux-Thann (11) |
| 152. | US Oberbruck Dolleren (10) | 2–2 (5–3 p) | FC Heiteren (9) |
| 153. | US Pulversheim FC (9) | 3–2 | FC Saint-Louis Neuweg (7) |
| 154. | AS Canton Vert (10) | 1–1 (2–4 p) | FC Munchhouse (8) |
| 155. | FC Sausheim (8) | 2–6 | AS Sundhoffen (6) |

=== Fourth round ===
These matches were played on 26, 27 and 28 September 2025, with one postponed until 1 October 2025.

Fourth Round Results: Grand Est
| Tie no | Home team (Tier) | Score | Away team (Tier) |
|---|---|---|---|
| 1. | FC Saint-Martin-sur-le-Pré/La Veuve/Recy (9) | 0–4 | EF Reims Sainte-Anne (7) |
| 2. | AS Pont-Sainte-Marie (8) | 0–3 | Chaumont FC (6) |
| 3. | FCCS Bragard (10) | 2–3 | SC Marnaval (6) |
| 4. | USI Blaise (8) | 0–0 (5–6 p) | RC Épernay Champagne (6) |
| 5. | JS Saint-Julien FC (7) | 0–2 | AS Chartreux (8) |
| 6. | CO Langres (10) | 1–3 | FC Fontaine-Origny-Vallant (8) |
| 7. | Stade Chevillonnais (7) | 1–4 | FC Nogentais (7) |
| 8. | US Éclaron (8) | 2–4 | FC Saint-Meziery (6) |
| 9. | FC Porcien (9) | 3–1 | FC Christo (7) |
| 10. | ES Côteaux Sud (9) | 0–5 | Olympique Charleville Prix Ardenne Métropole (5) |
| 11. | FCF La Neuvillette-Jamin (7) | 2–1 | AS Tournes/Renwez/Les Mazures/Arreux/Montcornet (8) |
| 12. | Olympique Torcy-Sedan (8) | 1–5 | Reims Murigny Franco Portugais (7) |
| 13. | USA Le Chesne (8) | 1–2 | FC Bogny (6) |
| 14. | CA Villers-Semeuse (7) | 4–2 (Note: Tie reversed from original draw.) | SC Sézannais (8) |
| 15. | ES Saint-Germainmont (10) | 0–5 | Cormontreuil FC (6) |
| 16. | Rethel SF (7) | 1–2 | AS Saint-Brice-Courcelles (7) |
| 17. | SS Hilbesheim (10) | 0–4 | US Nousseviller (7) |
| 18. | FC Freyming (7) | 2–1 | US Farébersviller 05 (8) |
| 19. | US Forbach (6) | 2–1 | AS Montigny-lès-Metz (7) |
| 20. | AS Montbronn (8) | 0–3 | APM Metz (6) |
| 21. | ES Rimling-Erching-Obergailbach (9) | 0–8 | US Thionville Lusitanos (4) |
| 22. | ES Macheren Petit-Ebersviller (9) | 0–9 | CA Boulay (7) |
| 23. | AS Hellimer (10) | 3–3 (2–4 p) | Fleury FC (8) |
| 24. | Entente Neufgrange-Siltzheim (10) | 3–2 | FC Hochwald (8) |
| 25. | EFT Sarrebourg (9) | 2–3 | AS Réding (8) |
| 26. | USAG Uckange (6) | 1–1 (5–4 p) | UL Plantières Metz (7) |
| 27. | ESAP Metz (8) | 0–4 | Sarreguemines FC (6) |
| 28. | SC Terville (8) | 6–1 | AS Saulnes Longlaville (8) |
| 29. | AG Metzervisse (8) | 0–5 | ES Villerupt-Thil (6) |
| 30. | US Etain-Buzy (7) | 1–2 | ES Rosselange Vitry (7) |
| 31. | Entente Gravelotte-Verneville (10) | 0–2 | US Jarny (8) |
| 32. | FC Hettange-Grande (6) | 3–2 | AS Algrange (7) |
| 33. | FC Magny (11) | 1–3 | FC Bassin Piennois (8) |
| 34. | CS Godbrange (9) | 1–1 (2–4 p) | JS Audunoise (8) |
| 35. | ES Marange-Silvange (8) | 2–1 | GS Neuves-Maisons (6) |
| 36. | Jarville JF (6) | 3–1 | Val de l'Orne FC (7) |
| 37. | FC Houdemont (9) | 1–2 | RS Amanvillers (7) |
| 38. | AS Pagny-sur-Moselle (6) | 2–1 | US Châtel Conquistadors (7) |
| 39. | US Vandœuvre (7) | 0–4 | US Raon-l'Étape (6) |
| 40. | FC Hadol-Dounoux-Uriménil (9) | 1–7 | FC Éloyes (7) |
| 41. | AS Ramonchamp (9) | 0–1 | GS Haroué-Benney (7) |
| 42. | AC Blainville-Damelevières (8) | 0–2 | SAS Épinal (4) |
| 43. | FC Écrouves (9) | 0–7 | FC Lunéville (6) |
| 44. | SC Baccarat (9) | 1–2 | ES Golbey (6) |
| 45. | FC Pont-Saint-Vincent (10) | 0–5 | Bar-le-Duc FC (7) |
| 46. | GSA Tomblaine (8) | 2–2 (4–3 p) | AS Nomexy-Vincey-Moriville (9) |
| 47. | ENJ Val-de-Seille (8) | 2–0 | Bulgnéville Contrex Vittel FC (8) |
| 48. | FC Dombasle-sur-Meurthe (9) | 1–1 (3–1 p) | Entente Sorcy Void-Vacon (7) |
| 49. | FC Saint-Max-Essey (8) | 0–3 | SR Saint-Dié (6) |
| 50. | FC Obermodern (6) | 1–0 | AS Ohlungen (7) |
| 51. | FC Weitbruch (9) | 0–3 | AS Ingwiller/Menchhoffen (7) |
| 52. | AS Gambsheim (9) | 0–2 | FC Saverne (8) |
| 53. | FCE Reichshoffen (13) | 0–2 | AS Uhrwiller (9) |
| 54. | US Schleithal (8) | 2–3 | US Sarre-Union (6) |
| 55. | AS Butten-Diemeringen (8) | 3–2 | SS Weyersheim (6) |
| 56. | FCE Schirrhein (6) | 2–2 (7–6 p) | FC Scheibenhard (7) |
| 57. | US Oberlauterbach (7) | 3–2 | AS Hochfelden (8) |
| 58. | US Ettendorf (9) | 1–2 | FCSR Haguenau (4) |
| 59. | FC Mothern (9) | 1–3 | FC Drusenheim (7) |
| 60. | ASL Robertsau (7) | 1–2 | Association Still-Mutzig (6) |
| 61. | SR Hoenheim (9) | 2–2 (3–4 p) | US Ittenheim (8) |
| 62. | AS Hoerdt (7) | 2–2 (3–5 p) | FC Kronenbourg Strasbourg (7) |
| 63. | AGIIR Florival (8) | 0–4 | FA Illkirch Graffenstaden (6) |
| 64. | SC Schiltigheim (6) | 0–5 | SR Colmar (4) |
| 65. | FC Soultz 1919 (11) | 0–3 | FC Bennwihr (9) |
| 66. | UJ Epfig (10) | 0–4 | AS Erstein (7) |
| 67. | US Pulversheim FC (9) | 0–3 | FC Geispolsheim 01 (7) |
| 68. | AP Joie et Santé Strasbourg (8) | 1–3 | FCO Strasbourg Koenigshoffen 06 (6) |
| 69. | FC Rosheim (10) | 3–3 (2–4 p) | FC Rossfeld (8) |
| 70. | FC Munchhouse (8) | 2–3 | FC Riedisheim (9) |
| 71. | FC Sierentz-Kappelen (8) | 1–3 | AS Anatolie Mulhouse (9) |
| 72. | FC Ensisheim (10) | 1–1 (4–5 p) | FC Hirtzfelden (8) |
| 73. | US Oberbruck Dolleren (10) | 0–5 | ASC Biesheim (4) |
| 74. | US Wittenheim (7) | 3–0 | FC Bartenheim (7) |
| 75. | FC Roderen (11) | 0–8 | FC Mulhouse (5) |
| 76. | AS Blanc Vieux-Thann (11) | 0–2 | AS Aspach-le-Haut (9) |
| 77. | AS Illzach Modenheim (6) | 6–0 | AS Blotzheim (7) |
| 78. | AS Sundhoffen (6) | 2–0 | FC Illhaeusern (7) |
| 79. | Stade Burnhauptois (8) | 1–3 | AS Ribeauvillé (8) |
| 80. | ASL Kœtzingue (6) | 4–1 | Mulhouse Foot Réunis (6) |

=== Fifth round ===
These matches were played on 10, 11 and 12 October 2025.

Fifth Round Results: Grand Est
| Tie no | Home team (Tier) | Score | Away team (Tier) |
|---|---|---|---|
| 1. | FA Illkirch Graffenstaden (6) | 3–0 | AS Sundhoffen (6) |
| 2. | AS Aspach-le-Haut (9) | 2–0 | AS Ribeauvillé (8) |
| 3. | Association Still-Mutzig (6) | 2–0 | ASL Kœtzingue (6) |
| 4. | FC Bennwihr (9) | 1–4 | US Raon-l'Étape (6) |
| 5. | FC Geispolsheim 01 (7) | 2–1 | US Ittenheim (8) |
| 6. | SR Saint-Dié (6) | 6–2 | AS Illzach Modenheim (6) |
| 7. | FC Rossfeld (8) | 1–1 (3–4 p) | FC Hirtzfelden (8) |
| 8. | AS Anatolie Mulhouse (9) | 1–1 (2–4 p) | US Wittenheim (7) |
| 9. | FC Riedisheim (9) | 0–7 | FC Mulhouse (5) |
| 10. | AS Erstein (7) | 0–6 | ASC Biesheim (4) |
| 11. | Entente Neufgrange-Siltzheim (10) | 0–3 | US Sarre-Union (6) |
| 12. | AS Uhrwiller (9) | 1–1 (2–4 p) | FCO Strasbourg Koenigshoffen 06 (6) |
| 13. | US Nousseviller (7) | 0–3 | FC Freyming (7) |
| 14. | FC Saverne (8) | 1–1 (4–3 p) | US Oberlauterbach (7) |
| 15. | AS Réding (8) | 1–2 | Sarreguemines FC (6) |
| 16. | CA Boulay (7) | 0–4 | FCSR Haguenau (4) |
| 17. | AS Ingwiller/Menchhoffen (7) | 1–2 | FCE Schirrhein (6) |
| 18. | FC Kronenbourg Strasbourg (7) | 2–0 | FC Obermodern (6) |
| 19. | FC Drusenheim (7) | 3–4 | US Forbach (6) |
| 20. | AS Butten-Diemeringen (8) | 0–3 | SR Colmar (4) |
| 21. | SC Terville (8) | 2–2 (2–4 p) | RC Épernay Champagne (6) |
| 22. | AS Saint-Brice-Courcelles (7) | 1–0 | FC Hettange-Grande (6) |
| 23. | JS Audunoise (8) | 1–2 | EF Reims Sainte-Anne (7) |
| 24. | FC Bassin Piennois (8) | 0–3 | USAG Uckange (6) |
| 25. | FC Porcien (9) | 0–1 | FC Bogny (6) |
| 26. | US Jarny (8) | 0–1 | ES Villerupt-Thil (6) |
| 27. | Reims Murigny Franco Portugais (7) | 4–4 (5–4 p) | ES Marange-Silvange (8) |
| 28. | Cormontreuil FC (6) | 3–2 | FCF La Neuvillette-Jamin (7) |
| 29. | CA Villers-Semeuse (7) | 1–2 | Olympique Charleville Prix Ardenne Métropole (5) |
| 30. | US Thionville Lusitanos (4) | 2–0 (Note: Tie reversed from original draw.) | ES Rosselange Vitry (7) |
| 31. | ES Golbey (6) | 0–3 | SAS Épinal (4) |
| 32. | GS Haroué-Benney (7) | 2–2 (4–5 p) | ENJ Val-de-Seille (8) |
| 33. | FC Éloyes (7) | 1–1 (6–7 p) | AS Pagny-sur-Moselle (6) |
| 34. | Fleury FC (8) | 1–2 | GSA Tomblaine (8) |
| 35. | FC Saint-Meziery (6) | 2–0 | Chaumont FC (6) |
| 36. | RS Amanvillers (7) | 3–1 | FC Lunéville (6) |
| 37. | FC Nogentais (7) | 1–0 | AS Chartreux (8) |
| 38. | FC Fontaine-Origny-Vallant (8) | 2–2 (3–1 p) | SC Marnaval (6) |
| 39. | FC Dombasle-sur-Meurthe (9) | 0–2 | APM Metz (6) |
| 40. | Bar-le-Duc FC (7) | 3–3 (5–4 p) | Jarville JF (6) |

=== Sixth round ===
These matches were played on 25 and 26 October 2025.

Sixth Round Results: Grand Est
| Tie no | Home team (Tier) | Score | Away team (Tier) |
|---|---|---|---|
| 1. | Bar-le-Duc FC (7) | 1–1 (3–5 p) | Olympique Charleville Prix Ardenne Métropole (5) |
| 2. | GSA Tomblaine (8) | 1–0 | Reims Murigny Franco Portugais (7) |
| 3. | US Thionville Lusitanos (4) | 1–0 (Note: Tie reversed from original draw.) | USAG Uckange (6) |
| 4. | APM Metz (6) | 6–2 | RS Amanvillers (7) |
| 5. | ES Villerupt-Thil (6) | 1–3 | FC Bogny (6) |
| 6. | EF Reims Sainte-Anne (7) | 3–0 | FC Fontaine-Origny-Vallant (8) |
| 7. | ENJ Val-de-Seille (8) | 1–4 | AS Saint-Brice-Courcelles (7) |
| 8. | RC Épernay Champagne (6) | 3–0 | AS Pagny-sur-Moselle (6) |
| 9. | FC Nogentais (7) | 0–2 | Cormontreuil FC (6) |
| 10. | FC Saint-Meziery (6) | 1–0 | SAS Épinal (4) |
| 11. | FC Freyming (7) | 2–0 | SR Saint-Dié (6) |
| 12. | US Raon-l'Étape (6) | 2–0 | FC Geispolsheim 01 (7) |
| 13. | US Sarre-Union (6) | 2–0 | FC Kronenbourg Strasbourg (7) |
| 14. | FCE Schirrhein (6) | 1–1 (7–8 p) | Association Still-Mutzig (6) |
| 15. | AS Aspach-le-Haut (9) | 2–2 (4–5 p) | FC Mulhouse (5) |
| 16. | US Wittenheim (7) | 3–0 | FC Saverne (8) |
| 17. | FC Hirtzfelden (8) | 0–2 | FCO Strasbourg Koenigshoffen 06 (6) |
| 18. | US Forbach (6) | 6–2 | FCSR Haguenau (4) |
| 19. | Sarreguemines FC (6) | 2–0 | SR Colmar (4) |
| 20. | FA Illkirch Graffenstaden (6) | 0–0 (7–8 p) | ASC Biesheim (4) |
