= Fritz Keller =

French footballer (1913–1985)

Personal information
- Full name: Friedrich Keller / Frédéric Keller
- Date of birth: 21 August 1913
- Place of birth: Strasbourg, Germany
- Date of death: 8 June 1985 (aged 71)
- Position: Forward

Senior career*
Years	Team	Apps	(Gls)
1934–1939	Strasbourg		
1940–1944	SG SS Straßburg		

International career
1934–1937	France	8	(3)
- * Club domestic league appearances and goals

Frédéric "Fritz" Keller (born Friedrich Keller, 21 August 1913 – 8 June 1985) was a German-born professional French footballer who played as a forward in the Première division for RC Strasbourg, and for the France national team.

== Club career ==
Born to an Alsatian mother and a German father in Strasbourg (then Reichsland Elsaß-Lothringen), Fritz Keller was the second and arguably the most talented of the three Keller brothers (Albert, Fritz, Curt) who all played as professionals for RC Strasbourg in the 1930s. He was a key member of the Strasbourg team that finished second in the 1934–35 Championship and reached the final of the cup in 1937.

When Alsace was de facto annexed by the Third Reich, Fritz Keller elected to play for SS side SG SS Straßburg in the Gauliga Elsaß rather than continuing with RC Strasbourg's ersatz, Rasensport Club Straßburg. According to some of his former teammates at RCS, this was more an opportunistic move than a real ideological gesture as the SS were offering significant rewards to build up the best team in Alsace.

== International career ==
Keller had his first cap for France on 10 May 1934 against the Netherlands and participated in World Cup 1934, playing one game against Austria's Wunderteam. He was the first RC Strasbourg player to earn a cap with the national team. His younger brother Curt Keller also had one cap with France in 1937 but, at that time, Fritz's career for the national team had ended.
