= Godfred Bekoé =

Ghanaian footballer

Personal information
- Full name: Godfred Apraku Bekoé
- Date of birth: 12 November 1992 (age 34)
- Place of birth: Kumasi, Ghana
- Height: 1.76 m (5 ft 9 in)
- Position: Forward

Team information
- Current team: FCOSK 06

Youth career
- Strasbourg

Senior career*
Years	Team	Apps	(Gls)
2009–2011	Strasbourg B	32	(2)
2011–2013	Guingamp B	8	(1)
2013–2014	Olympiakos Nicosia	16	(5)
2014	Chernomorets Burgas	9	(2)
2015	Gaz Metan Mediaș	6	(0)
2017–2019	Schiltigheim	57	(12)
2019–2022	Haguenau	44	(8)
2022–2023	Angoulême	26	(2)
2023–	FCOSK 06	32	(10)
- * Club domestic league appearances and goals as of 7 December 2024

Godfred Bekoé (born 12 November 1992) is a Ghanaian professional footballer who plays as a forward for French Championnat National 3 club FCOSK 06.
