= Gauliga Elsaß =

- Founded: 1940
- Folded: 1945
- Replaced by: territory returned to France
- Country: Nazi Germany
- Region: Alsace
- Gau: Gau Baden-Elsaß
- Level on pyramid: Level 1
- Domestic cup: Tschammerpokal
- Last champions: FC Mülhausen 93 (1943–44)

The Gauliga Elsaß was the highest football league in the region of Alsace (German: Elsaß, the old orthography of Elsass) from 1940 to 1945. The Nazis reorganised the administrative region and the Alsace became part of the Gau Baden-Elsaß.

== Overview ==
The league was introduced by the Nazi Sports Office in 1940, after the French defeat and the direct German administration of the Alsace region. The Alsace region was traditionally disputed between the two countries and had been part of the German Empire from 1871 to 1918, with its football clubs playing in the German league system then.

The de facto annexation of Alsace in June 1940 meant the return of competitive football to the region, as league competition had already been suspended in France in September 1939 but continued in Germany. The Gauliga Elsaß was established with sixteen clubs in two groups of eight, all from the Alsace region. The two group winners then played a home-and-away final to determine the Alsace champion and the team entering the German championship.

The league was reduced to one single group of twelve teams in the 1941–42 season with the bottom four teams relegated. The season after, it operated with ten clubs and two relegated teams. This modus remained in place for the 1943–44 season.

In late 1944, the Alsace region became part of the frontline and it was doubtful whether the 1944–45 season was even able to get underway. The league was scheduled to have two groups, a northern one with five and a southern one with six clubs.

After the region had been completely liberated by allied forces, Strasbourg being retaken on 22 November 1944, the Alsace and its football clubs returned to France with the top club, the RC Strasbourg, reentering the French first division in 1945.

== Founding members of the league ==
The sixteen founding members in 1940 were split into two groups. All clubs came from the French league system and are still active as of 2008, unless stated otherwise:

- Group 1:
- Rasen SC Straßburg, finished 10th in 1938–39 French Division 1 as RC Strasbourg, reverted to their original name in 1940
- SC Schiltigheim, was Sporting Club Schiltigheim, reverted to their original name in 1940
- SG SS Straßburg, was SC Red-Star Strasbourg, reverted to their original name in 1940
- FC Hagenau, was FC Haguenau, reverted to their original name in 1940
- FK Mars Bischheim, was CS Mars 1905 Bischheim, reverted to their original name in 1940
- SV 06 Schlettstadt, was SC Sélestat, reverted to their original name in 1940
- SV Straßburg, was Association Sportive de Strasbourg, reverted to their original name in 1940
- FC Bischweiler, FC Bischwiller, reverted to their original name in 1940
- Group 2:
- FC Mülhausen 93, finished 7th in 1938–39 French Division 2 as FC de Mulhouse, reverted to their original name in 1940
- SpVgg Kolmar, finished 5th in 1938–39 French Division 2 as SR Colmar, reverted to their original name in 1940
- FC Wittenheim, Union Sportive Wittenheim, reverted to their old name in 1940
- FC Kolmar, FC Colmar, reverted to their old name in 1940, renamed FC Colmar in 1945, and Stade de Colmar 77 in 1977; club disbanded in June 1986
- ASV Mülhausen, was Cercle Athlétique Mulhousien, reverted to their original name in 1940, renamed Association Sportive Mulhousienne in 1945
- SpVgg Dornach, was FC Dornach, reverted to their old name in 1940
- SV Wittelsheim, was Association Sportive des Colonies Amélie Wittelsheim, reverted to their original name in 1940
- FC St. Ludwig, was FC Saint-Louis, reverted to their old name in 1940, renamed FC Saint-Louis in 1945, merged with FC Neuweg in 1990
- All clubs had to either Germanise their name or, if formed before 1918, revert to their original German name.

== Winners and runners-up of the league ==
The winners and runners-up of the league:

| Season | Winner | Runner-Up |
|---|---|---|
| 1940–41 | FC Mülhausen 93 | Rasen SC Straßburg |
| 1941–42 | SG SS Straßburg | Rasen SC Straßburg |
| 1942–43 | FC Mülhausen 93 | Rasen SC Straßburg |
| 1943–44 | FC Mülhausen 93 | SG SS Straßburg |

== Placings in the league 1940-44 ==
The complete list of clubs competing in the league:

| Club | 1941 | 1942 | 1943 | 1944 |
|---|---|---|---|---|
| FC Mühlhausen 93 | 1 | 4 | 1 | 1 |
| SpVgg Kolmar | 2 | 3 | 4 | 4 |
| FC Wittenheim | 3 | 12 | | |
| FC Kolmar | 4 | 8 | 8 | 7 |
| ASV Mühlhausen | 5 | | | |
| SpVgg Mühlhausen-Dornach | 6 | 11 | | |
| SV Wittelsheim | 7 | | | |
| FC St. Ludwig | 8 | | | |
| Rasen SC Straßburg | 1 | 2 | 2 | 6 |
| SC Schiltigheim | 2 | 5 | 5 | 8 |
| SG SS Straßburg | 3 | 1 | 3 | 2 |
| FC Hagenau | 4 | 7 | 6 | 5 |
| Mars Bischheim | 5 | 6 | 10 | |
| SV 06 Schlettstadt | 6 | | 7 | 10 |
| SV Straßburg | 7 | | | |
| FC Bischweiler | 8 | | | |
| TSV Schweighausen | | 9 | | 9 |
| Stern Mühlhausen | | 10 | | |
| FV Walk | | | 9 | |
| FC Hüningen | | | | 3 |
