= SC Schiltigheim =

French football club

- Full name: Sporting Club de Schiltigheim
- Founded: 1 March 1914; 112 years ago (as SAEJ Schiltigheim); 1915; 111 years ago (as FK Schiltigheim); 1919; 107 years ago (as SC Schiltigheim)
- Ground: Stade de l'Aar
- Capacity: 2,500
- Chairman: Pierre Schlienger
- Manager: Alexandre Pepe
- League: Régional 1 Grand Est
- 2022–23: National 3 Group F, 10th (relegated)
- Website: sc-schiltigheim.footeo.com
Home colours	Away colours

Sporting Club de Schiltigheim is a French association football club from Schiltigheim, Alsace. It plays in Régional 1, the sixth tier of football in France. It plays at the Stade de l'Aar in Schiltigheim, which has a capacity of 2,500.

The club was established on 1 March 1914 as Sports-Abteilung des Evangelischen Jugendbundes Schiltigheim, an ethnically-German church-based youth club in what was at the time Elsass in the German Empire. They adopted they name Fussball-Klub Schiltigheim in 1915. Following the end of World War I and the return of Alsace to France, the club was renamed Sporting Club de Schiltigheim in 1919.

== History ==
=== Between France and Germany ===
During the interwar period, SC was a competitive local side that claimed the championship of the Alsace Champion Division d'Honneur in 1937, as well a regional cup title and a clutch of junior division titles in the mid-1930s. The club's rise was interrupted when Alsace came under German control after the Nazi invasion early in World War II. Like many other clubs in occupied territories, the Schiltigheim side became part of German football competition and played four seasons (1940–44) as Sport-Club Schiltigheim in what was initially called the Gauliga Unterelass (I) – later the Gauliga Elsass – one of several top-flight regional divisions. They earned a second-place result there in 1940–41 before slipping to become a lower table side. SC returned to French competition following the return of Alsace to France in 1945.

=== Postwar play ===
Following the war, SC was part of the Division d’Honneur Alsace until a title win advanced them to Division 4 play. Another title in 1993 that advanced the club to the Championnat de France amateur 2 level play where they spent four seasons until being sent down in 1997. Schiltigheim won its way to the Championnat de France Amateur Gr. B (IV) after a championship in the Championnat de France Amateur 2 Gr. C (V) in 2003. The team then struggled, narrowly missing relegation in 2006 before suffering consecutive demotions in the following two seasons. SC finished in second place in the Division d’Honneur Alsace (VI) in 2009.

In 2010, the club were champions of Division d'Honneur Alsace and gained promotion to CFA 2. They played at the fifth tier until 2017 when they won promotion again to the fourth tier division, Championnat National 2. They returned to the fifth tier in 2022.

== Current squad ==
As of 10 February 2018

Note: Flags indicate national team as defined under FIFA eligibility rules; some limited exceptions apply. Players may hold more than one non-FIFA nationality.

No.	Pos.	Nation	Player
—	GK	FRA	Guillaume Gauclin
—	GK	FRA	Stéphane Schneider
—	DF	GUI	Abdoulaye Cissé
—	DF	FRA	Vincent Decker
—	DF	FRA	Jean-Alain Fanchone
—	DF	FRA	Antoine Metzler
—	DF	FRA	François-Xavier Runtz
—	MF	FRA	Karim Bellahcene
—	MF	FRA	Wissam Chakrouni
—	MF	FRA	Cyril Dreyer
—	MF	FRA	Benjamin Genghini

No.	Pos.	Nation	Player
—	MF	FRA	Loris Ieraci
—	MF	FRA	Bartolome Meyer
—	MF	FRA	Florian Nellac
—	MF	FRA	Pierrick Rakotoharisoa
—	MF	FRA	Ludovic Saline
—	FW	GHA	Godfred Bekoé
—	FW	FRA	Jean-Charles Blaudet
—	FW	FRA	Zakariya Boukalada
—	FW	FRA	Matthieu Fels
—	FW	CIV	Jean-Philippe Krasso
—	FW	TUN	Ali Mathlouthi

== Notable players ==
- (France) Loum Tchaouna (youth)
