= SG SS Straßburg =

German football club

SS SG Straßburg
- Full name: Sportgemeinschaft Schutzstaffel Straßburg
- Founded: 1 August 1900; 125 years ago (as FC Frankonia 1900 Straßburg); 1920; 105 years ago (as Sport-Club Red-Star Strasbourg); September 1940; 85 years ago (as Sportgemeinschaft Schutzstaffel Straßburg)
- Dissolved: 1944; 81 years ago
- Ground: Am Wasserturm
- Capacity: 4,000
- League: Alsace
Home colours	Away colours

SS Straßburg was a German association football club from the city of Straßburg, Alsace (today Strasbourg, in France).

The team was founded in 1900 as FC Frankonia 1900 Straßburg (after Franconia) when the region was under German control. Following the end of World War I, the territory of Alsace was returned to France and the team became part of that country's competition as Sport-Club Red-Star Strasbourg. In August 1940, after the Nazi conquest of the province, Frankonia collapsed, but was immediately re-constituted out of its former membership as Sportgemeinschaft Schutzstaffel Straßburg in September.

The formation of military clubs was common in Germany at the time, but the creation of an SS side required the permission of Schutzstaffel head Heinrich Himmler. SG became part of the Gauliga Unterelsass, a regional first division established in the territory of Alsace, without having to first qualify. The side was quickly strengthened by the addition of other SS members who were required to leave behind their original clubs to don the white and black kit bearing the SS rune as a crest.

In their second season, in what had since become the Gauliga Elsaß, SG easily won the division and advanced through the national playoffs to the quarterfinals, where they were put out by eventual champions FC Schalke 04, who emerged as the dominant side of the era. They also took part in the 1942 Tschammerpokal tournament, predecessor to today's DFB-Pokal (German Cup), and went as far as the third round before being crushed 1:15 by TSV 1860 München on their way to a cup triumph. Their turn in the national playoffs was the highpoint of the Straßburg side's history; they could earn only third and second-place results in their next two campaigns. Play in the Gauliga Unterelsass never got underway in the 1944–45 season as Allied armies began their advance through Europe and into Germany, with SG disappearing in 1944.

== Honours ==
- Gauliga Elsaß (I) champions: 1942
