= FC Sélestat =

French football club

SC Sélestat
- Full name: Sportclub Sélestat
- Founded: 1906
- Ground: Parc des Sports
- Chairman: Andre Oberlin
- League: Ligue d Alsace - Bas Rhin - Promotion A - Group D (IX)
Home colours	Away colours

FC Sélestat is a French football from the city of Sélestat in Alsace, France. It was established in 1906 as the German club Fussball Klub 1906 Schlettstadt in what was at the time Schlettstadt, Alsace, in Germany.

Following the Franco-Prussian War, the territories of Alsace and parts of Lorraine were ceded to Germany as Alsace–Lorraine. SV was formed out of the merger of predecessor sides Schlettstadter Fussball-Klub 1906 and Fussball-Klub Sport Schlettstadt and played as an undistinguished local side. The disputed territories once again became part of France after World War I and Schlettstadt joined that country's football competition in 1920 as Sportclub Sélestat in the regional top-flight Division d'Honneur Alsace. The team won titles there in 1920 and 1922 and participated in the opening round of the Coupe de France de football in 1920–21. They went on to make other appearances in the opening round of the tournament through the 1920s and 1930s.

The region was re-conquered by Nazi Germany early in World War II and SV Schlettstadt resumed its former place in German football as part of the first division Gauliga Unterelsass in 1940. The team finished the season in last place and was relegated, but quickly returned to the top flight. They made a losing appearance in the qualifying round of play for the Tschammerspokal, predecessor of today's DFB-Pokal (German Cup) in 1941, and then performed poorly in regular season competition over the next two years. The 1944–45 season of what was now the Gauliga Oberelsass was never started as Allied armies began their advance into Germany. The club resumed play in French competition after the war as SC Sélestat (Sporting Club Sélestat).

FC Sélestat remains active today and has departments for badminton, bowling, handball, swimming, and volleyball. As of the 2007–08 season, the footballers play in Promotion A, Group D, of the Ligue d' Alsace - Bas Rhin (IX). With three games to play, the club sits on last place. The club's handball team has become prominent nationally.

== Honours ==
as SC Sélestat

- Division d'Honneur Alsace champions: 1920, 1922
