= FCSR Haguenau =

French association football club

- Full name: Football Club Sports réunis Haguenau
- Nickname: Les Sandhaas
- Founded: 1987
- Stadium: Parc des Sports
- Capacity: 7,000
- Manager: Michel Anthoni
- Coach: Philippe Knobloch
- League: National 2 Group C
- 2023–24: National 2 Group D, 9th of 14
- Website: www.fcsrhaguenau.footeo.com
Home colours	Away colours	Third colours

Football Club Sports Réunis Haguenau is a French association football team founded in 1987 as a result of the merger of FC Haguenau 1900 and Sports Réunis Haguenau 1920. They are based in Haguenau, Alsace, France and currently play in the Championnat National 1, the fourth tier in the French football league system. They play at the Parc des Sports in Haguenau, which has a capacity of 5,000.

== Season by season ==
Year	Level	Division	Position
1997–98	5	Championnat de France Amateur 2 Group C	5th
1998–99	5	Championnat de France Amateur 2 Group B	3rd
1999–00	5	Championnat de France Amateur 2 Group B	1st
2000–01	4	Championnat de France Amateur Group A	18th
2001–02	5	Championnat de France Amateur 2 Group C	13th
2002–03	5	Championnat de France Amateur 2 Group C	10th
2003–04	5	Championnat de France Amateur 2 Group C	14th
2004–05	6	Division d'Honneur Alsace	1st
2005–06	5	Championnat de France Amateur 2 Group B	8th
2006–07	5	Championnat de France Amateur 2 Group B	12th
2007–08	5	Championnat de France Amateur 2 Group B	10th
2008–09	5	Championnat de France Amateur 2 Group C	14th
2009–10	6	Division d'Honneur Alsace	9th
2010–11	6	Division d'Honneur Alsace	4th
2011–12	6	Division d'Honneur Alsace	6th
2012–13	6	Division d'Honneur Alsace	2nd
2013–14	6	Division d'Honneur Alsace	1st
2014–15	5	Championnat de France Amateur 2 Group E#	4th
2015–16	5	Championnat de France Amateur 2 Group F	9th
2016–17	5	Championnat de France Amateur 2 Group D	3rd
