= 1971–72 VfL Bochum season =

VfL Bochum
1971–72 season
- President: Ottokar Wüst
- Head Coach: Hermann Eppenhoff
- Stadium: Stadion an der Castroper Straße
- Bundesliga: 9th
- DFB-Pokal: Second round
- Top goalscorer: League: Hans Walitza (22); All: Hans Walitza (25)
- Highest home attendance: 35,000 (vs Borussia Mönchengladbach, 28 August 1971)
- Lowest home attendance: 5,000 (vs Hertha BSC, 28 June 1972)
- Average home league attendance: 18,588
Home colours	Away colours

The 1971–72 VfL Bochum season was the 34th season in club history.

== Matches ==
=== Legend ===
Win Draw Loss

=== Bundesliga ===
14 August 1971 1	VfL Bochum	1–0	Eintracht Braunschweig	Bochum
15:30	Hartl 14'			Stadium: Stadion an der Castroper Straße; Attendance: 30,000; Referee: Gert Meuser (Ingelheim)

21 August 1971 2	Rot-Weiß Oberhausen	2–3	VfL Bochum	Oberhausen
15:30	Tenhagen 8'; Schumacher 60'		Walitza 3', 74'; Hartl 49'	Stadium: Niederrheinstadion; Attendance: 28,000; Referee: Gerd Siepe (Cologne)

28 August 1971 3	VfL Bochum	0–2	Borussia Mönchengladbach	Bochum
15:30			Heynckes 34'; Wloka 70'	Stadium: Stadion an der Castroper Straße; Attendance: 35,000; Referee: Kurt Tschenscher (Mannheim)

1 September 1971 4	1. FC Kaiserslautern	4–1	VfL Bochum	Kaiserslautern
20:00	Reinders 37'; Seel 59', 81'; Friedrich 71'		Balte 27'	Stadium: Betzenbergstadion; Attendance: 30,000; Referee: Alfons Betz (Regensburg)

4 September 1971 5	VfL Bochum	2–1	Arminia Bielefeld	Bochum
15:30	Walitza 42'; Köper 89'		Damjanoff 11'	Stadium: Stadion an der Castroper Straße; Attendance: 16,000; Referee: Rudolf Schröck (Riegelsberg)

11 September 1971 6	SV Werder Bremen	2–0	VfL Bochum	Bremen
15:30	Kamp 68'; Laumen 75'			Stadium: Weserstadion; Attendance: 33,000; Referee: Heinz Aldinger (Waiblingen)

18 September 1971 7	VfB Stuttgart	3–2	VfL Bochum	Stuttgart
15:30	Haug 1'; Entenmann 27'; Frank 40'		Balte 34'; Walitza 69'	Stadium: Neckarstadion; Attendance: 20,000; Referee: Jan Redelfs (Hannover)

25 September 1971 8	VfL Bochum	0–2	FC Bayern Munich	Bochum
15:30			Hoeneß 38'; Hansen 67'	Stadium: Stadion an der Castroper Straße; Attendance: 27,000; Referee: Walter Horstmann (Hildesheim)

2 October 1971 9	Hannover 96	4–0	VfL Bochum	Hannover
15:30	Reimann 33'; Wiesemes 44' (o.g.); Keller 65', 84'			Stadium: Niedersachsenstadion; Attendance: 17,000; Referee: Dieter Wohlfarth (Bergen-Enkheim)

13 October 1971 10	VfL Bochum	3–1	MSV Duisburg	Bochum
20:00	Hartl 41'; Krämer 72'; Fern 75'		Rettkowski 70'	Stadium: Stadion an der Castroper Straße; Attendance: 17,000; Referee: Dieter Berner (Enzberg)

16 October 1971 11	Hamburger SV	3–2	VfL Bochum	Hamburg
15:30	Seeler 58', 70'; Bjørnmose 81'		Walitza 5'; Balte 13'	Stadium: Volksparkstadion; Attendance: 15,000; Referee: Rudolf Frickel (Munich)

23 October 1971 12	VfL Bochum	1–5	1. FC Köln	Bochum
15:00	Wosab 50' (pen.)		Scheermann 3'; Rupp 42', 55'; Galeski 53' (o.g.); Overath 86'	Stadium: Stadion an der Castroper Straße; Attendance: 20,000; Referee: Heinz Aldinger (Waiblingen)

30 October 1971 13	Eintracht Frankfurt	3–2	VfL Bochum	Frankfurt am Main
15:30	Konca 8', 56'; Parits 69'		Wosab 76'; Walitza 84'	Stadium: Waldstadion; Attendance: 14,000; Referee: Ferdinand Biwersi (Bliesransbach)

6 November 1971 14	VfL Bochum	4–2	Borussia Dortmund	Bochum
14:30	Etterich 3', 39'; Balte 9' (pen.); Fechner 29'		Hohnhausen 67'; Weinkauff 74'	Stadium: Stadion an der Castroper Straße; Attendance: 20,000; Referee: Horst Bonacker (Quadrath-Ichendorf)

13 November 1971 15	FC Schalke 04	4–1	VfL Bochum	Gelsenkirchen
15:30	H. Kremers 14'; Rüssmann 58'; Fischer 60'; Fichtel 75'		Balte 56'	Stadium: Glückauf-Kampfbahn; Attendance: 30,000; Referee: Dieter Heckeroth (Frankfurt)

27 November 1971 16	VfL Bochum	3–1	Fortuna Düsseldorf	Bochum
14:30	Fechner 13'; Walitza 17'; Etterich 57'		Herzog 54'	Stadium: Stadion an der Castroper Straße; Attendance: 18,000; Referee: Philipp Geng (Freiburg)

11 December 1971 17	Hertha BSC	1–2	VfL Bochum	West Berlin
15:30	Gayer 47'		Walitza 4'; Wosab 25'	Stadium: Olympiastadion; Attendance: 5,000; Referee: Franz Wengenmeyer (Munich)

22 January 1972 18	Eintracht Braunschweig	0–2	VfL Bochum	Braunschweig
15:30			Fechner 24'; Walitza 80'	Stadium: Eintracht-Stadion; Attendance: 8,000; Referee: Kurt Tschenscher (Mannheim)

29 January 1972 19	VfL Bochum	2–0	Rot-Weiß Oberhausen	Bochum
14:30	Walitza 46'; Fern 80'			Stadium: Stadion an der Castroper Straße; Attendance: 14,000; Referee: Walter Eschweiler (Euskirchen)

8 February 1972 20	Borussia Mönchengladbach	1–1	VfL Bochum	Mönchengladbach
20:00	Kulik 79'		Walitza 29'	Stadium: Bökelbergstadion; Attendance: 20,000; Referee: Wolfgang Dittmer (Mutterstadt)

19 February 1972 21	VfL Bochum	4–2	1. FC Kaiserslautern	Bochum
15:00	Hartl 17', 60'; Balte 55', 83' (pen.)		Hosic 32'; Seel 59'	Stadium: Stadion an der Castroper Straße; Attendance: 21,000; Referee: Klaus Ohmsen (Hamburg)

26 February 1972 22	Arminia Bielefeld	3–1	VfL Bochum	Bielefeld
15:30	Jendrossek 45'; Kasperski 56'; Roggensack 90'		Walitza 12'	Stadium: Alm; Attendance: 14,000; Referee: Gerd Siepe (Cologne)

4 March 1972 23	VfL Bochum	4–2	SV Werder Bremen	Bochum
15:30	Walitza 18', 59'; Wosab 67'; Hartl 87'		Laumen 6'; Schmidt 22'	Stadium: Stadion an der Castroper Straße; Attendance: 10,000; Referee: Rudolf Frickel (Munich)

11 March 1972 24	VfL Bochum	1–1	VfB Stuttgart	Bochum
15:30	Hartl 40'		Frank 4'	Stadium: Stadion an der Castroper Straße; Attendance: 10,000; Referee: Walter Engel (Reimsbach)

18 March 1972 25	FC Bayern Munich	5–1	VfL Bochum	Munich
15:30	Krauthausen 6'; Müller 36', 56', 87'; Fechner 90' (o.g.)		Hartl 45'	Stadium: Grünwalder Stadion; Attendance: 20,000; Referee: Ferdinand Biwersi (Bliesransbach)

25 March 1972 26	VfL Bochum	2–2	Hannover 96	Bochum
15:30	Hartl 58'; Walitza 83'		Keller 67'; Reimann 86'	Stadium: Stadion an der Castroper Straße; Attendance: 18,000; Referee: Günter Linn (Altendiez)

8 April 1972 27	MSV Duisburg	2–2	VfL Bochum	Duisburg
15:30	Bella 5'; Wunder 7'		Wosab 16'; Krämer 69'	Stadium: Wedaustadion; Attendance: 9,000; Referee: Karl Riegg (Augsburg)

15 April 1972 28	VfL Bochum	2–1	Hamburger SV	Bochum
15:30	Hartl 26'; Etterich 30'		Memering 23'	Stadium: Stadion an der Castroper Straße; Attendance: 15,000; Referee: Philipp Geng (Freiburg)

22 April 1972 29	1. FC Köln	1–1	VfL Bochum	Cologne
15:30	Lauscher 50'		Walitza 31'	Stadium: Radrennbahn Müngersdorf; Attendance: 8,000; Referee: Gerd Hennig (Duisburg)

6 May 1972 30	VfL Bochum	3–1	Eintracht Frankfurt	Bochum
15:30	Etterich 10'; Walitza 40', 89'		Hölzenbein 23'	Stadium: Stadion an der Castroper Straße; Attendance: 15,000; Referee: Walter Niemann (Hamburg)

19 May 1972 31	Borussia Dortmund	1–1	VfL Bochum	Dortmund
20:00	Schütz 12' (pen.)		Köper 74'	Stadium: Stadion Rote Erde; Attendance: 18,000; Referee: Fritz Seiler (Schmiden)

3 June 1972 32	VfL Bochum	0–2	FC Schalke 04	Bochum
15:30			Fischer 10'; Kremers 66'	Stadium: Stadion an der Castroper Straße; Attendance: 25,000; Referee: Heinz Aldinger (Waiblingen)

24 June 1972 33	Fortuna Düsseldorf	3–1	VfL Bochum	Düsseldorf
15:30	Herzog 10'; Baltes 36'; Geye 43'		Walitza 18'	Stadium: Flinger Broich; Attendance: 5,000; Referee: Klaus-Dieter Roegner (Kleinburgwedel)

28 June 1972 34	VfL Bochum	4–2	Hertha BSC	Bochum
20:00	Walitza 35', 70', 77'; Balte 39'		Horr 49' (pen.); Gutzeit 81'	Stadium: Stadion an der Castroper Straße; Attendance: 5,000; Referee: Norbert Fuchs (Herdorf)

=== DFB-Pokal ===
5 December 1971 R1 1st leg	SC Tasmania 1900 Berlin	2–2	VfL Bochum	West Berlin
14:00	Nerlinger 33', 70' (pen.)		Etterich 25'; Walitza 83'	Stadium: Poststadion; Attendance: 3,884; Referee: Karl-Heinz Picker (Hamburg)

15 December 1971 R1 2nd leg	VfL Bochum	2–0 (4–2 agg.)	SC Tasmania 1900 Berlin	Bochum
	Walitza 30'; Krämer 66'			Stadium: Stadion an der Castroper Straße; Attendance: 6,000; Referee: Gerhard Boe (Uelzen)

12 February 1972 R2 1st leg	Hannover 96	0–0	VfL Bochum	Hannover
15:30				Stadium: Niedersachsenstadion; Attendance: 10,000; Referee: Norbert Fuchs (Herdorf)

23 February 1972 R2 2nd leg	VfL Bochum	2–4 (2–4 agg.)	Hannover 96	Bochum
15:00	Rüsing 32'; Walitza 46'		Reimann 11', 40', 63'; Keller 78'	Stadium: Stadion an der Castroper Straße; Attendance: 12,000; Referee: Rudolf Schröck (Riegelsberg)

== Squad ==
=== Squad and statistics ===
==== Squad, appearances and goals scored ====
No.	Pos	Nat	Player	Total		Bundesliga		DFB-Pokal	
No.	Pos	Nat	Player	Apps	Goals	Apps	Goals	Apps	Goals
	MF	(West Germany) FRG	Werner Balte	35	8	31	8	4	0
	DF	(West Germany) FRG	Heinz-Jürgen Blome	11	0	9	0	2	0
	MF	(West Germany) FRG	Udo Böckmann	1	0	1	0	0	0
	GK	(West Germany) FRG	Harry Bohrmann	1	0	1	0	0	0
	GK	(West Germany) FRG	Hans-Jürgen Bradler	38	0	34	0	4	0
	FW	(West Germany) FRG	Hans-Günter Etterich	23	6	20	5	3	1
	MF	(West Germany) FRG	Harry Fechner	27	3	23	3	4	0
	FW	(West Germany) FRG	Dieter Fern	36	2	32	2	4	0
	DF	(West Germany) FRG	Erwin Galeski	29	0	27	0	2	0
	FW	(West Germany) FRG	Hans-Werner Hartl	35	10	31	10	4	0
	DF	(West Germany) FRG	Werner Jablonski	7	0	7	0	0	0
	MF	(West Germany) FRG	Klaus-Peter Kerkemeier	0	0	0	0	0	0
	MF	(West Germany) FRG	Hans-Jürgen Köper	17	2	17	2	0	0
	MF	(West Germany) FRG	Werner Krämer	31	3	28	2	3	1
	MF	(West Germany) FRG	Franz-Josef Laufer	9	0	8	0	1	0
	DF	(West Germany) FRG	Manfred Rüsing	29	1	25	0	4	1
	DF	(West Germany) FRG	Dieter Versen	27	0	23	0	4	0
	FW	(West Germany) FRG	Hans Walitza	38	25	34	22	4	3
	DF	(West Germany) FRG	Gerd Wiesemes	9	0	9	0	0	0
	DF	(West Germany) FRG	Reinhold Wosab	37	5	34	5	3	0
	DF	(West Germany) FRG	Dieter Zorc	25	0	21	0	4	0

=== Transfers ===
==== Summer ====
In:

No.	Pos.	Nation	Player
—	GK	FRG	Harry Bohrmann (from DSC Wanne-Eickel)
—	MF	FRG	Franz-Josef Laufer (from SpVgg Erkenschwick)
—	DF	FRG	Reinhold Wosab (from Borussia Dortmund)
—	DF	FRG	Dieter Zorc (from Lüner SV)

Out:

No.	Pos.	Nation	Player
—	DF	FRG	Manfred Berens (to STV Werne)
—	GK	FRG	Theo Diegelmann (to 1. FC Nürnberg)
—	MF	FRG	Hans Grieger (to VfL Klafeld-Geisweid 08)
—	MF	FRG	Hans-Jürgen Jansen (to VfB Homberg)
—	MF	FRG	Rainer Pommerin (to VfL Bochum II)
—	FW	FRG	Erich Schiller (to TuS Witten-Stockum)
