= Horst Christopeit =

German footballer (born 1939)

Personal information
- Date of birth: 15 August 1939 (age 87)
- Position: Goalkeeper

Youth career
- –1957: SSVG Heiligenhaus 09/12
- 1957–1958: Schwarz-Weiß Essen

Senior career*
Years	Team	Apps	(Gls)
1958–	Schwarz-Weiß Essen	6	(0)
–1963	SSV Hagen		
1963–1969	VfL Bochum	157	(0)
1969–1970	Preußen Münster	7	(0)

International career
1965	West Germany Olympic	1	(0)
- * Club domestic league appearances and goals

Horst Christopeit (born 15 August 1939) is a German former professional footballer who played as a goalkeeper.

== Career statistics ==
Club performance			League		Cup		Total	
Season	Club	League	Apps	Goals	Apps	Goals	Apps	Goals
West Germany			League		DFB-Pokal		Total	
1958–59	Schwarz-Weiß Essen	2. Oberliga West	0	0	0	0	0	0
1959–60	Schwarz-Weiß Essen	Oberliga West	0	0	—		0	0
1960–61	Schwarz-Weiß Essen	2. Oberliga West	6	0	—		6	0
1961–62	?				—			
1962–63	SSV Hagen	Verbandsliga Westfalen			—			
1963–64	VfL Bochum	Verbandsliga Westfalen	28	0	—		28	0
1964–65	VfL Bochum	Verbandsliga Westfalen	30	0	—		30	0
1965–66	VfL Bochum	Regionalliga West	34	0	—		34	0
1966–67	VfL Bochum	Regionalliga West	33	0	—		33	0
1967–68	VfL Bochum	Regionalliga West	32	0	4	0	36	0
1968–69	VfL Bochum	Regionalliga West	0	0	—		0	0
1969–70	SC Preußen Münster	Regionalliga West	7	0	—		7	0
Total	West Germany				4	0		
Career total					4	0		
