= Hans-Werner Hartl =

German footballer (born 1946)

Personal information
- Date of birth: 10 November 1946 (age 79)
- Place of birth: Germany
- Position: Forward

Senior career*
Years	Team	Apps	(Gls)
1964–1970	SF Hamborn 07	144	(59)
1970–1973	VfL Bochum	71	(30)
1973–1977	Borussia Dortmund	118	(36)
1977–1978	Union Solingen	21	(7)
Total		354	(132)
- * Club domestic league appearances and goals

Hans-Werner Hartl (born 10 November 1946) is a German former professional footballer who played as a forward.

== Career statistics ==
Club performance			League		Cup		Total	
Season	Club	League	Apps	Goals	Apps	Goals	Apps	Goals
West Germany			League		DFB-Pokal		Total	
1964–65	SF Hamborn 07	Regionalliga West	1	0	—		1	0
1965–66	SF Hamborn 07	Regionalliga West	14	3	—		14	3
1966–67	SF Hamborn 07	Regionalliga West	17	6	—		17	6
1967–68	SF Hamborn 07	Regionalliga West	31	14	—		31	14
1968–69	SF Hamborn 07	Regionalliga West	24	9	—		24	9
1969–70	SF Hamborn 07	Regionalliga West	25	10	—		25	10
1970–71	VfL Bochum	Regionalliga West	32	17	—		32	17
1971–72	VfL Bochum	Bundesliga	31	10	4	0	35	10
1972–73	VfL Bochum	Bundesliga	8	3	0	0	8	3
1973–74	Borussia Dortmund	Regionalliga West	31	6	1	0	32	6
1974–75	Borussia Dortmund	2. Bundesliga	21	5	3	2	24	7
1975–76	Borussia Dortmund	2. Bundesliga	37	18	2	1	39	19
1976–77	Borussia Dortmund	Bundesliga	27	7	3	1	30	8
1977–78	Borussia Dortmund	Bundesliga	2	0	0	0	2	0
1977–78	Union Solingen	2. Bundesliga	21	7	0	0	21	7
Total	West Germany		354	132	13	4	367	136
Career total			354	132	13	4	367	136
