= Gerd Wiesemes =

German footballer

Personal information
- Full name: Gerd Wiesemes
- Date of birth: 29 January 1943 (age 83)
- Place of birth: Bochum, Germany
- Position: Defender

Youth career
- 1952–1961: VfL Bochum

Senior career*
Years	Team	Apps	(Gls)
1961–1972	VfL Bochum	275	(4)
1972–1976	SC Westfalia Herne		
Medal record
VfL Bochum
Winner	Verbandsliga Westfalen	1964–65
Runner-up	DFB-Pokal	1967–68
Runner-up	Regionalliga West	1968–69
Winner	Regionalliga West	1969–70
Winner	Regionalliga West	1970–71
SC Westfalia Herne
Winner	Verbandsliga Westfalen	1974–75
- * Club domestic league appearances and goals

Gerd Wiesemes (born 29 January 1943) is a retired German football defender.

== Career ==
=== Statistics ===
Club performance			League		Cup		Other		Total	
Season	Club	League	Apps	Goals	Apps	Goals	Apps	Goals	Apps	Goals
West Germany			League		DFB-Pokal		Other^{1}		Total	
1960–61	VfL Bochum	Oberliga West	0	0	1	0	—		1	0
1961–62	VfL Bochum	2. Oberliga West	11	0	—		—		11	0
1962–63	VfL Bochum	2. Oberliga West	16	0	—		—		16	0
1963–64	VfL Bochum	Verbandsliga Westfalen	23	0	—		—		23	0
1964–65	VfL Bochum	Verbandsliga Westfalen	31	0	—					
1965–66	VfL Bochum	Regionalliga West	34	1	—		—		34	1
1966–67	VfL Bochum	Regionalliga West	34	0	—		—		34	0
1967–68	VfL Bochum	Regionalliga West	31	1	5	0	—		36	1
1968–69	VfL Bochum	Regionalliga West	33	1	—		—		33	1
1969–70	VfL Bochum	Regionalliga West	33	1	—		8	0	41	1
1970–71	VfL Bochum	Regionalliga West	20	0	—		6	0	26	0
1971–72	VfL Bochum	Bundesliga	9	0	0	0	—		9	0
1972–73	SC Westfalia Herne	Regionalliga West			—		—			
1973–74	SC Westfalia Herne	Regionalliga West			—		—			
1974–75	SC Westfalia Herne	Verbandsliga Westfalen			1	0				
1975–76	SC Westfalia Herne	2. Bundesliga	0	0	0	0	—		0	0
Total	West Germany				7	0				
Career total					7	0				

^{1} 1964–65 and 1974–75 include the Verbandsliga Westfalen promotion playoffs. 1969–70 and 1970–71 include the Regionalliga promotion playoffs.
