= Hans Walitza =

German footballer (born 1945)

Personal information
- Date of birth: 26 November 1945 (age 80)
- Place of birth: Mülheim an der Ruhr, Allied-occupied Germany
- Height: 1.82 m (6 ft 0 in)
- Position: Forward

Senior career*
Years	Team	Apps	(Gls)
–1965	VfB Speldorf		
1965–1969	Schwarz-Weiß Essen	100	(48)
1969–1974	VfL Bochum	166	(112)
1974–1979	1. FC Nürnberg	127	(71)
1979–1981	TSV Röttenbach		

International career
1973	West Germany U23	3	(1)

Managerial career
- 1979–1981: TSV Röttenbach
- 2007–2008: SG Linden/Dahlhausen
- * Club domestic league appearances and goals

Hans Walitza (born 26 November 1945) is a German retired professional football player and manager who played as a forward.

== Career statistics ==
Appearances and goals by club, season and competition
Club	Season	League			DFB-Pokal		DFB-Ligapokal		Other^{1}		Total	
Club	Season	Division	Apps	Goals	Apps	Goals	Apps	Goals	Apps	Goals	Apps	Goals
VfB Speldorf	1964–65				—		—		—			
Schwarz-Weiß Essen	1965–66	Regionalliga West	11	6	—		—		—		11	6
Schwarz-Weiß Essen	1966–67	Regionalliga West	25	11	3	2	—		7	2	35	15
Schwarz-Weiß Essen	1967–68	Regionalliga West	30	15	—		—		—		30	15
Schwarz-Weiß Essen	1968–69	Regionalliga West	34	16	—		—		—		34	16
VfL Bochum	1969–70	Regionalliga West	34	31	—		—		8	8	42	39
VfL Bochum	1970–71	Regionalliga West	33	28	—		—		8	7	41	35
VfL Bochum	1971–72	Bundesliga	34	22	4	3	—		—		38	25
VfL Bochum	1972–73	Bundesliga	34	18	4	2	5	2	—		43	22
VfL Bochum	1973–74	Bundesliga	31	13	2	1	—		—		33	14
1. FC Nürnberg	1974–75	2. Bundesliga	29	21	2	0	—		—		31	21
1. FC Nürnberg	1975–76	2. Bundesliga	33	21	3	1	—		2	1	38	23
1. FC Nürnberg	1976–77	2. Bundesliga	29	21	5	5	—		—		34	26
1. FC Nürnberg	1977–78	2. Bundesliga	27	8	1	0	—		2	2	30	10
1. FC Nürnberg	1978–79	Bundesliga	9	0	2	3	—		—		11	3
TSV Röttenbach	1979–80	Landesliga Bayern-Mitte			—		—		—			
TSV Röttenbach	1980–81	Landesliga Bayern-Mitte			1	1	—		—			
Career total					27	18	5	2	27	20		

^{1} 1966–67, 1969–70 and 1970–71 include the Regionalliga promotion playoffs. 1975–76 and 1977–78 include the 2. Bundesliga/Bundesliga promotion/relegation playoffs.
