= Manfred Rüsing =

German footballer

Personal information
- Full name: Manfred Rüsing
- Date of birth: 3 June 1946 (age 80)
- Position: Defender

Youth career
- –1966: Lüner SV

Senior career*
| Years | Team | Apps | (Gls) |
| 1966–1970 | Lüner SV | | |
| 1970–1973 | VfL Bochum | | |
| 1973–1977 | 1. FC Nürnberg | 113 | (1) |
- * Club domestic league appearances and goals

Manfred Rüsing (born 3 June 1946) is a retired German footballer.

| Club performance | | | League | | Cup | | Total | |
| Season | Club | League | Apps | Goals | Apps | Goals | Apps | Goals |
| West Germany | | | League | | DFB-Pokal | | Total | |
|---|---|---|---|---|---|---|---|---|
| 1966–67 | Lüner SV | Verbandsliga Westfalen | | | — | | | |
| 1967–68 | Lüner SV | Regionalliga West | | | — | | | |
| 1968–69 | Lüner SV | Regionalliga West | | | — | | | |
| 1969–70 | Lüner SV | Regionalliga West | | | — | | | |
| 1970–71 | VfL Bochum | Regionalliga West | | | — | | | |
| 1971–72 | VfL Bochum | Bundesliga | 25 | 0 | 4 | 1 | 29 | 1 |
| 1972–73 | VfL Bochum | Bundesliga | 11 | 0 | 1 | 0 | 12 | 0 |
| 1973–74 | 1. FC Nürnberg | Regionalliga Süd | 34 | 0 | 2 | 0 | 36 | 0 |
| 1974–75 | 1. FC Nürnberg | 2. Bundesliga | 33 | 1 | 3 | 0 | 36 | 1 |
| 1975–76 | 1. FC Nürnberg | 2. Bundesliga | 33 | 0 | 1 | 0 | 34 | 0 |
| 1976–77 | 1. FC Nürnberg | 2. Bundesliga | 13 | 0 | 1 | 0 | 14 | 0 |
| Total | West Germany | | | | 12 | 1 | | |
| Career total | | | | | 12 | 1 | | |
