= Dieter Fern =

German footballer

Personal information
- Full name: Dieter Fern
- Date of birth: 1 December 1944 (age 81)
- Height: 1.73 m (5 ft 8 in)
- Position: Forward

Senior career*
Years	Team	Apps	(Gls)
1965–1967	Bayer 04 Leverkusen		
1967–1969	Kickers Offenbach		
1969–1972	VfL Bochum		
1972–?	Union Salzgitter		
- * Club domestic league appearances and goals

Dieter Fern (born 1 December 1944) is a German former football forward.

== Career statistics ==
Club performance			League		Cup		Total	
Season	Club	League	Apps	Goals	Apps	Goals	Apps	Goals
West Germany			League		DFB-Pokal		Total	
1965–66	Bayer Leverkusen	Regionalliga West			—			
1966–67	Bayer Leverkusen	Regionalliga West			—			
1967–68	Kickers Offenbach	Regionalliga Süd			—			
1968–69	Kickers Offenbach	Bundesliga	18	1	0	0	18	1
1969–70	VfL Bochum	Regionalliga West			—			
1970–71	VfL Bochum	Regionalliga West			—			
1971–72	VfL Bochum	Bundesliga	32	2	4	0	36	2
1972–73	Union Salzgitter	Amateurliga Niedersachsen			—			
Total	West Germany				4	0		
Career total					4	0		
