= Johann Sabath =

German footballer (born 1939)

Personal information
- Date of birth: 4 June 1939
- Date of death: 12 August 2023 (aged 84)
- Height: 1.70 m (5 ft 7 in)
- Position: Defender

Senior career*
Years	Team	Apps	(Gls)
1957–1962	SF Hamborn 07		
1962–1966	Meidericher SV	98	(5)
1966–1969	MSV Duisburg	36	(1)
1969–1970	VfL Bochum		
1971–1973	1. FC Bocholt		
- * Club domestic league appearances and goals

Johann Sabath (4 June 1939 – 12 August 2023) was a German professional footballer who played as a defender.

== Career statistics ==
Club performance			League		Cup		Total	
Season	Club	League	Apps	Goals	Apps	Goals	Apps	Goals
West Germany			League		DFB-Pokal		Total	
1957–58	SF Hamborn 07	Oberliga West	10	0	—		10	0
1958–59	SF Hamborn 07	2. Oberliga West			—			
1959–60	SF Hamborn 07	Oberliga West	4	0	—		4	0
1960–61	SF Hamborn 07	Oberliga West	21	8	2	0	23	8
1961–62	SF Hamborn 07	Oberliga West	21	6	—		21	6
1962–63	Meidericher SV	Oberliga West	17	0	—		17	0
1963–64	Meidericher SV	Bundesliga	28	2	1	0	29	2
1964–65	Meidericher SV	Bundesliga	26	0	1	0	27	0
1965–66	Meidericher SV	Bundesliga	27	3	4	0	31	3
1966–67	MSV Duisburg	Bundesliga	26	1	1	0	27	1
1967–68	MSV Duisburg	Bundesliga	10	0	1	0	11	0
1968–69	MSV Duisburg	Bundesliga	0	0	0	0	0	0
1969–70	VfL Bochum	Regionalliga West			—			
Total	West Germany				10	0		
Career total					10	0		
