= Dieter Zorc =

German footballer (1939–2007)

Personal information
- Date of birth: 17 October 1939
- Place of birth: Lünen, Germany
- Date of death: 16 October 2007 (aged 67)
- Place of death: Cartagena, Spain
- Position: Defender

Senior career*
Years	Team	Apps	(Gls)
1964–1967	TuS Eving-Lindenhorst		
1967–1971	Lüner SV		
1971–1972	VfL Bochum	21	(0)
1972–1976	Lüner SV		

International career
1966–1971	West Germany Olympic	32	(3)

Managerial career
- 1973–1976: Lüner SV
- 1983: Lüner SV
- * Club domestic league appearances and goals

Dieter Zorc (born 17 October 1939 – 16 October 2007) was a German footballer who played as a defender. He was the father of Michael Zorc.

== Career statistics ==
Appearances and goals by club, season and competition
Club	Season	League			DFB-Pokal		DFB-Ligapokal		Total	
Club	Season	Division	Apps	Goals	Apps	Goals	Apps	Goals	Apps	Goals
TuS Eving-Lindenhorst	1964–65	Verbandsliga Westfalen			—		—			
TuS Eving-Lindenhorst	1965–66	Verbandsliga Westfalen			—		—			
TuS Eving-Lindenhorst	1966–67	Verbandsliga Westfalen			—		—			
Lüner SV	1967–68	Regionalliga West			—		—			
Lüner SV	1968–69	Regionalliga West			—		—			
Lüner SV	1969–70	Regionalliga West			—		—			
Lüner SV	1970–71	Regionalliga West			—		—			
VfL Bochum	1971–72	Bundesliga	21	0	4	0	—		25	0
VfL Bochum	1972–73	Bundesliga	0	0	0	0	5	1	5	1
VfL Bochum	Total		21	0	4	0	5	1	30	1
Lüner SV	1972–73	Regionalliga West			—		—			
Lüner SV	1973–74	Verbandsliga Westfalen			—		—			
Lüner SV	1974–75	Verbandsliga Westfalen			—		—			
Lüner SV	1975–76	Verbandsliga Westfalen			—		—			
Career total					4	0	5	1		
