= Diegelmann =

Diegelmann is a surname. Notable people with the surname include:

- Theo Diegelmann (1939–2026), German football goalkeeper
- Wilhelm Diegelmann (1861–1934), German actor

== See also ==
- Diggelmann, a Swiss surname
