= Regionalliga Nord (1963–1974) =

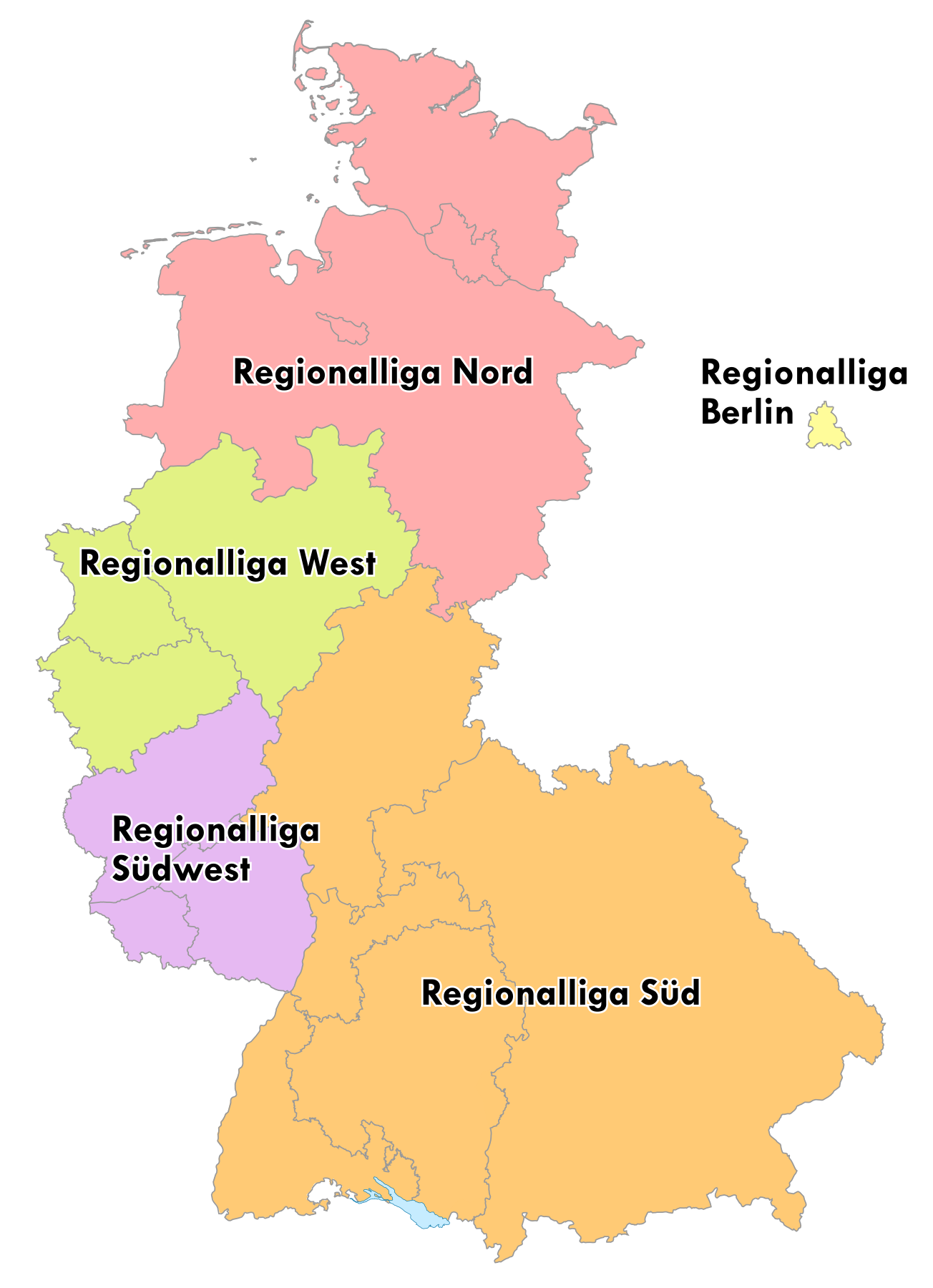
- Founded: 1963
- Folded: 1974 (11 seasons)
- Replaced by: 2. Bundesliga Nord
- Country: Germany
- State: Niedersachsen; Schleswig-Holstein; Bremen; Hamburg
- Level on pyramid: Level 2
- Promotion to: Bundesliga
- Relegation to: Amateurliga Hamburg; Amateurliga Bremen; Amateurliga Niedersachsen; Amateurliga Schleswig-Holstein
- Last champions: Eintracht Braunschweig (1973–74)

The Regionalliga Nord was the second-highest level of the German football league system in the north of Germany from 1963 until the formation of the 2. Bundesliga in 1974. It covered the states of Niedersachsen, Bremen, Hamburg and Schleswig-Holstein.

== Overview ==
The Regionalliga Nord started out in 1963 with 18 teams in the league, had 17 clubs from 1964 to 1971 and then returned to a strength of 18.

It was formed from the thirteen clubs of the Oberliga Nord which were not admitted to the new Bundesliga and from five promoted clubs from the Amateurliga. The Regionalliga Nord was as such a continuation of the Oberliga Nord under a different name and a tier lower.

Along with the Regionalliga Nord went another four Regionalligas, these five formed the second tier of German football until 1974:

- Regionalliga West, covering the state of Nordrhein-Westfalen
- Regionalliga Süd, covering the state of Bayern, Hessen and Baden-Württemberg
- Regionalliga Berlin, covering West-Berlin
- Regionalliga Südwest, covering the states of Rheinland-Pfalz and Saarland

The new Regionalligas were formed along the borders of the old post-World War II Oberligas, not after a balanced regional system. Therefore, the Oberligas Berlin and West covered small but populous areas while Nord and Süd covered large areas. Südwest was something of an anachronism, neither large nor populous.

The winners and runners-up of this league were admitted to the promotion playoff to the Bundesliga, which was staged in two groups of originally four, later five teams each with the winner of each group going up.

The bottom two teams were relegated to the Amateurligas. Below the Regionalliga Nord were the following Amateurligas:

- Amateurliga Bremen
- Amateurliga Hamburg
- Amateurliga Schleswig-Holstein
- Amateurliga Niedersachsen (in two groups for the 1963-64 season)

The FC St. Pauli, VfL Osnabrück, Holstein Kiel, Arminia Hannover, VfB Lübeck, VfL Wolfsburg and TuS Bremerhaven 93 all played all eleven seasons of the Regionalliga Nord. The VfL Osnabrück stands out in its consistency, having before that played every season of the Oberliga Nord (1947–1963) and afterwards also every season of the 2. Bundesliga Nord (1974–1981). This 37-year run ended only in 1985 when the club was relegated from the 2. Bundesliga to the Oberliga, for a year.

== Disbanding of the Regionalliga Nord ==
The league was dissolved in 1974. According to their performance of the last couple of seasons, six clubs of the Regionalliga went to the new 2. Bundesliga Nord, Eintracht Braunschweig, the champion, was promoted to the Bundesliga. Ten clubs were relegated to the new Oberliga Nord. The northern region was the only one of the five who chose to continue to run a unified highest league for its area, the new Oberliga Nord, not to be confused with the old Oberliga Nord which run till 1963. Two clubs were relegated all the way to the fourth tier, the Amateurligas.

The teams admitted to the 2. Bundesliga Nord were:

- FC St. Pauli
- VfL Osnabrück
- VfL Wolfsburg
- HSV Barmbek-Uhlenhorst
- Olympia Wilhelmshaven
- SC Göttingen 05

The relegated teams to the Oberliga Nord were:

- VfB Oldenburg
- SV Meppen
- Arminia Hannover
- Concordia Hamburg
- OSV Hannover
- Holstein Kiel
- TuS Bremerhaven 93
- Heider SV
- Itzehoer SV
- Phönix Lübeck

Two teams were relegated all the way to the fourth tier:

- VfB Lübeck
- VfL Pinneberg

== Re-formation of the Regionalliga Nord ==
The Regionalliga Nord reformed in 1994, now as the third tier of German football, taking over from the Oberliga Nord which was disband. In 2000, the Regionalligas were reduced in numbers to two, Nord now covered all of the northern half of Germany. In 2008, with the introduction of the 3. Liga, the Regionalliga became the fourth tier of German football. The clubs from Nordrhein-Westfalen joined the new Regionalliga West and the clubs based in the southern part of former East Germany which were playing in the Regionalliga Süd joined instead.

== Winners and runners-up of the Regionalliga Nord ==
The winners and runners-up of the league were:

**Season**	**Winner**	**Runner-Up**
1963–64	FC St. Pauli	**Hannover 96**
1964–65	Holstein Kiel	FC St. Pauli
1965–66	FC St. Pauli	SC Göttingen 05
1966–67	Arminia Hannover	SC Göttingen 05
1967–68	Arminia Hannover	SC Göttingen 05
1968–69	VfL Osnabrück	VfB Lübeck
1969–70	VfL Osnabrück	VfL Wolfsburg
1970–71	VfL Osnabrück	FC St. Pauli
1971–72	FC St. Pauli	VfL Osnabrück
1972–73	FC St. Pauli	VfL Osnabrück
1973–74	**Eintracht Braunschweig**	FC St. Pauli

- **Bold** denotes team went on to gain promotion to the Bundesliga.
- The FC St. Pauli (1964, 1966, 1972, 1973, 2007), VfL Osnabrück (1969–1971, 1999, 2000) and Eintracht Braunschweig (1974, 2005) all have won the old and the new Regionalliga.
- The FC St. Pauli, VfL Osnabrück and Borussia Neunkirchen (Südwest) hold the joined record for Regionalliga titles, five each.

== Placings in the Regionalliga Nord 1963 to 1974 ==
The league placings from 1963 to 1974:

Club	64	65	66	67	68	69	70	71	72	73	74
Hannover 96	2	B	B	B	B	B	B	B	B	B	B
Eintracht Braunschweig	B	B	B	B	B	B	B	B	B	B	1
FC St. Pauli	1	2	1	5	4	3	4	2	1	1	2
VfL Osnabrück	6	10	7	7	7	1	1	1	2	2	3
VfL Wolfsburg	9	6	8	4	3	7	2	9	3	3	4
HSV Barmbeck-Uhlenhorst	18			14	14	10	10	5	4	5	5
VfB Oldenburg	7	13	12	9	11	13	9	17		11	6
Olympia Wilhelmshaven							15	6	8	12	7
SV Meppen								18		10	8
Arminia Hannover	3	4	6	1	1	5	8	14	14	9	9
Concordia Hamburg	16	9	9	6	13	12	17				10
OSV Hannover									13	15	11
SC Göttingen 05		5	2	2	2	4	5	7	5	4	12
Holstein Kiel	5	1	3	3	8	8	3	4	11	7	13
TuS 93 Bremerhaven	12	7	4	15	5	9	6	8	15	14	14
Heider SV						16		16	9	13	15
VfB Lübeck	14	11	5	10	9	2	7	3	6	6	16
Itzehoer SV			14	12	12	14	12	12	16	16	17
VfL Pinneberg											18
Phönix Lübeck					6	6	13	13	12	8	19
TuS Celle						15	11	10	10	17	
SC Leu Braunschweig							14	11	7	18	
SC Sperber Hamburg				13	10	17		15	17		
Polizei SV Bremen									18		
ASV Bergedorf 85	8	8	11	11	15	11	16				
FC Altona 93	4	3	10	8	16						
TuS Haste					17						
VfV Hildesheim	13	15	15	16							
Bremer SV			13	17							
SV Friedrichsort	15	14	16								
Victoria Hamburg	11	12	17								
VfR Neumünster	10	16									
Rasensport Harburg		17									
VfL Oldenburg	17										

Source:"Regionalliga Nord". Das deutsche Fussball-Archiv.

=== Key ===
Symbol	Key
B	Bundesliga
Place	League
Blank	Played at a league level below this league
