= Diggelmann =

Diggelmann is a surname that occurs primarily in Switzerland. Notable people with the surname include:

- Alex Diggelmann (1902–1987), Swiss graphic artist and book designer
- Robert Diggelmann (1924–2018), Swiss wrestler
- Walter Diggelmann (1915–1999), Swiss road bicycle racer
- Walter Matthias Diggelmann (1927–1979), Swiss writer

== See also ==
- Diegelmann, a German surname
