= Dieter Herzog =

German footballer (1946–2025)

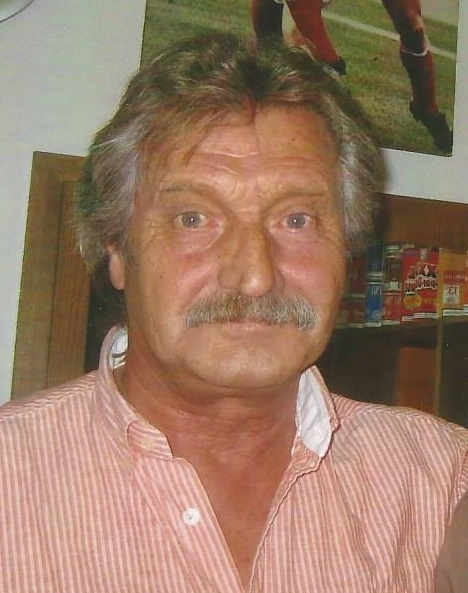
- Herzog in 2013

Personal information
- Date of birth: 15 July 1946
- Place of birth: Oberhausen, North Rhine, Allied-occupied Germany
- Date of death: 19 November 2025 (aged 79)
- Height: 1.73 m (5 ft 8 in)
- Position: Winger

Youth career
- 1956–1965: Sterkrade 06/07
- 1965–1967: VfB Bottrop

Senior career*
Years	Team	Apps	(Gls)
1967–1970	Hamborn 07	96	(27)
1970–1976	Fortuna Düsseldorf	201	(40)
1976–1983	Bayer Leverkusen	193	(29)

International career
1972–1974	West Germany B	2	(0)
1974	West Germany	5	(0)
Medal record
Men's football
Representing West Germany
FIFA World Cup
Winner	1974 West Germany
- * Club domestic league appearances and goals

Dieter Herzog (15 July 1946 – 19 November 2025) was a German professional footballer who played as a winger. He made 360 appearances scoring 46 goals for Fortuna Düsseldorf and Bayer Leverkusen in his career in Bundesliga and 2. Bundesliga. Herzog made five appearances for the West Germany national team.

== Club career ==
Herzog started his senior career with Sportfreunde Hamborn 07 in a lower division and joining Düsseldorf a year before the club returned to the Bundesliga in 1971. He was part of the Düsseldorf team that ended third in the Bundesliga in 1972–73 and 1973–74, the season in which he made the biggest impact. In 1976, the left-sided winger joined Bayer Leverkusen when the club was attempting to build a squad that could lead them all the way up to the Bundesliga. In fact, they succeeded and enabled Herzog to play four more seasons in the best German division then. In addition to his 250 appearances in the West German top-flight, he also played in 161 matches in the old Regionalliga and 110 matches in the 1974 introduced 2. Bundesliga.

== International career ==
In the prime of his game in the years before the 1974 FIFA World Cup, Dieter Herzog was called up by Helmut Schön to represent West Germany five times in 1974. As he also came to action in the games against Yugoslavia and Sweden in the second round of the tournament, he played a part in the host nation winning the World Cup on that occasion. Overall he won five caps – all in 1974.

== Career after pro times & Death ==
Employed by Bayer Leverkusen sponsor Bayer after the end of his career, Herzog worked as a scout for his old club later on. Herzog died in November 2025, at the age of 79.
