= 1975–76 2. Bundesliga =

2nd season of the second-tier football league in Germany

2. Bundesliga
- Season: 1975–76
- Champions: Nord: Tennis Borussia Berlin; Süd: 1. FC Saarbrücken
- Promoted: Nord: Tennis Borussia Berlin; Borussia Dortmund; Süd: 1. FC Saarbrücken
- Relegated: Nord: 1. FC Mülheim; SpVgg Erkenschwick; DJK Gütersloh; Spandauer SV; Süd: 1. FSV Mainz 05; FC Schweinfurt 05; Eintracht Bad Kreuznach; SSV Reutlingen
- Matches: Nord: 380; Süd: 380
- Top goalscorer: Nord: Norbert Stolzenburg (27 goals); Süd: Karl-Heinz Granitza (29 goals)
- Average attendance: Nord: 6,396; Süd: 7,258

The 1975–76 2. Bundesliga season was the second season of the 2. Bundesliga, the second tier of the German football league system. It was played in two regional divisions, Nord and Süd.

Tennis Borussia Berlin, Borussia Dortmund and 1. FC Saarbrücken were promoted to the Bundesliga while 1. FC Mülheim, SpVgg Erkenschwick, DJK Gütersloh, Spandauer SV, 1. FSV Mainz 05, FC Schweinfurt 05, Eintracht Bad Kreuznach and SSV Reutlingen were relegated to the Oberligas and Amateurligas.

== Nord ==
For the 1975–76 season saw Bayer Leverkusen, Spandauer SV, Westfalia Herne and Union Solingen promoted to the 2. Bundesliga from the Oberliga and Amateurligas while Wuppertaler SV and Tennis Borussia Berlin had been relegated to the 2. Bundesliga Nord from the Bundesliga.

=== League table ===
Pos	Team	Pld	W	D	L	GF	GA	GD	Pts	Promotion, qualification or relegation
1	Tennis Borussia Berlin (C, P)	38	25	4	9	86	43	+43	54	Promotion to Bundesliga
2	Borussia Dortmund (P)	38	22	8	8	93	37	+56	52	Qualification for promotion play-offs
3	Preußen Münster	38	20	9	9	65	42	+23	49	
4	Fortuna Köln	38	19	7	12	74	49	+25	45	
5	Wuppertaler SV	38	18	9	11	76	53	+23	45	
6	VfL Osnabrück	38	19	7	12	61	47	+14	45	
7	Schwarz-Weiss Essen	38	19	6	13	63	52	+11	44	
8	SG Wattenscheid 09	38	17	9	12	71	58	+13	43	
9	Arminia Bielefeld	38	14	14	10	49	46	+3	42	
10	Westfalia Herne	38	16	8	14	60	57	+3	40	
11	1. SC Göttingen 05	38	15	7	16	63	54	+9	37	
12	Alemannia Aachen	38	12	12	14	45	53	−8	36	
13	SG Union Solingen	38	11	14	13	45	56	−11	36	
14	FC St. Pauli	38	13	8	17	70	82	−12	34	
15	Bayer Leverkusen	38	12	8	18	46	61	−15	32	
16	Wacker 04 Berlin	38	11	9	18	51	82	−31	31	
17	1. FC Mülheim (R)	38	10	10	18	54	76	−22	30	Relegation to Oberliga
18	SpVgg Erkenschwick (R)	38	10	9	19	45	69	−24	29	Relegation to Oberliga
19	DJK Gütersloh (R)	38	12	4	22	52	70	−18	28	Relegation to Oberliga
20	Spandauer SV (R)	38	2	4	32	33	115	−82	8	Relegation to Oberliga

Source: Bundesliga.de
Rules for classification: 1) points; 2) goal difference; 3) number of goals scored.
(C) Champions; (P) Promoted; (R) Relegated

=== Results ===
Home \ Away	AAC	TBB	W04	DSC	BVB	ERK	SWE	G05	DJK	SCW	FKO	B04	FMU	PRM	OSN	SGU	SSV	STP	SGW	WSV
Alemannia Aachen	—	1–0	1–1	0–0	1–2	1–1	2–1	4–1	2–1	5–0	0–0	2–1	2–1	1–2	2–1	2–1	1–1	2–2	3–0	1–1
Tennis Borussia Berlin	6–0	—	4–1	2–0	1–3	1–0	4–1	4–0	0–1	3–1	3–2	4–1	5–0	3–0	0–0	4–0	3–2	3–0	2–1	2–1
Wacker 04 Berlin	2–0	2–1	—	2–1	2–1	2–0	4–3	0–1	2–1	3–2	1–7	0–3	4–3	1–1	1–0	0–0	1–1	1–4	0–3	1–2
Arminia Bielefeld	1–0	0–2	1–1	—	1–1	3–1	1–2	2–1	2–0	2–4	1–1	2–0	2–1	2–2	1–0	0–0	1–0	1–0	2–2	3–1
Borussia Dortmund	3–0	4–0	6–0	2–2	—	6–0	3–0	3–0	2–1	4–0	0–0	7–0	6–0	1–0	2–2	0–0	3–0	6–2	4–1	2–1
SpVgg Erkenschwick	2–0	1–1	2–2	1–1	1–4	—	0–1	2–1	3–1	0–4	2–1	4–0	3–2	2–0	1–1	4–3	5–1	1–3	2–3	0–1
Schwarz-Weiß Essen	2–0	2–2	3–1	2–2	1–0	3–1	—	1–1	2–0	4–1	1–1	2–1	4–1	0–2	2–0	2–0	3–1	4–0	3–1	2–2
Göttingen 05	2–0	3–0	2–0	2–0	3–0	4–1	1–2	—	2–1	3–1	1–1	2–0	0–1	1–3	1–2	2–2	4–1	1–2	0–2	1–3
DJK Gütersloh	2–1	2–4	1–0	0–2	0–2	4–0	0–2	1–0	—	1–2	3–2	3–1	1–1	0–1	4–2	3–1	4–0	4–4	1–2	0–5
Westfalia Herne	2–0	3–2	3–3	0–0	2–1	0–0	2–0	2–2	0–1	—	0–2	2–1	6–1	2–1	2–0	2–1	2–0	1–1	1–2	4–2
Fortuna Köln	1–1	6–1	2–1	1–2	3–1	1–0	3–2	3–4	2–0	3–1	—	3–0	2–0	1–0	3–0	2–0	4–2	2–1	5–4	0–4
Bayer Leverkusen	0–1	0–2	1–1	0–0	0–2	2–0	0–1	2–1	3–2	2–1	0–0	—	3–0	6–1	1–1	2–0	2–1	2–3	2–1	1–1
1. FC Mülheim	0–0	0–2	2–0	5–1	1–1	1–1	3–1	0–4	2–1	0–0	1–0	2–2	—	1–1	1–3	5–1	6–1	4–3	1–2	0–0
Preußen Münster	4–0	0–0	4–2	1–1	4–1	2–0	2–0	1–0	2–2	0–0	2–1	1–2	3–1	—	2–0	2–1	7–0	2–2	2–1	1–1
VfL Osnabrück	1–0	1–2	4–2	2–0	3–2	3–0	2–0	2–2	3–1	1–0	1–0	1–0	3–0	3–2	—	1–1	3–1	3–0	1–0	4–0
Union Solingen	1–1	1–0	2–1	2–0	1–1	0–0	1–0	1–1	0–1	1–1	2–1	1–1	1–0	1–0	1–1	—	2–1	1–4	2–2	2–1
Spandauer SV	1–4	0–5	2–3	1–3	1–2	0–2	0–1	0–4	1–1	0–2	1–3	1–0	4–5	1–2	1–0	2–7	—	1–5	1–1	1–4
FC St. Pauli	1–1	1–2	5–2	2–1	1–1	2–1	2–1	0–3	2–1	1–3	2–1	1–1	1–1	0–2	2–3	1–2	5–1	—	3–5	2–4
SG Wattenscheid	3–1	1–2	0–0	1–1	2–1	1–1	3–0	1–1	4–1	2–0	4–3	2–3	1–0	1–2	3–1	2–2	3–0	2–0	—	2–2
Wuppertaler SV	2–2	1–4	3–1	1–4	0–3	3–0	2–2	3–1	4–1	2–1	0–1	2–0	1–1	0–1	4–2	3–0	2–0	5–0	2–0	—

Source: DFB
Legend: Blue = home team win; Yellow = draw; Red = away team win.

=== Top scorers ===
The league's top scorers:

Goals	Player	Team
27	(Germany) Norbert Stolzenburg	Tennis Borussia Berlin
22	(Germany) Hans Fritsche	Schwarz-Weiß Essen
19	(Germany) Franz Gerber	Wuppertaler SV
18	(Germany) Hans-Werner Hartl	Borussia Dortmund
18	(Germany) Herbert Mühlenberg	VfL Osnabrück
17	(Germany) Hans-Joachim Abel	Westfalia Herne
17	(Germany) Otmar Ludwig	Fortuna Köln
15	(Germany) Wolfgang John	Wacker 04 Berlin/FC St. Pauli
15	(Germany) Gerd Kasperski	Borussia Dortmund
15	(Germany) Horst Neumann	FC St. Pauli

== Süd ==
For the 1975–76 season saw Eintracht Kreuznach, FSV Frankfurt, Jahn Regensburg and SSV Reutlingen promoted to the 2. Bundesliga from the Amateurligas and VfB Stuttgart relegated to the 2. Bundesliga Süd from the Bundesliga.

=== League table ===
Pos	Team	Pld	W	D	L	GF	GA	GD	Pts	Promotion, qualification or relegation
1	1. FC Saarbrücken (C, P)	38	23	11	4	66	28	+38	57	Promotion to Bundesliga
2	1. FC Nürnberg	38	24	6	8	78	42	+36	54	Qualification for promotion play-offs
3	FC Homburg	38	19	13	6	72	41	+31	51	
4	1860 Munich	38	19	9	10	78	55	+23	47	
5	SpVgg Bayreuth	38	18	11	9	71	55	+16	47	
6	Röchling Völklingen	38	18	9	11	72	65	+7	45	
7	Darmstadt 98	38	19	5	14	76	64	+12	43	
8	Waldhof Mannheim	38	16	10	12	64	55	+9	42	
9	Bayern Hof	38	18	5	15	60	56	+4	41	
10	SpVgg Fürth	38	17	3	18	64	52	+12	37	
11	VfB Stuttgart	38	16	4	18	67	60	+7	36	
12	Mainz 05 (Note: 1. FSV Mainz 05 voluntarily returned their license for the following season to the DFB and were therefore relegated.) (R)	38	12	12	14	81	92	−11	36	Relegation to Oberliga
13	FSV Frankfurt	38	15	5	18	49	63	−14	35	
14	FK Pirmasens	38	13	7	18	66	78	−12	33	
15	FC Augsburg	38	12	8	18	57	56	+1	32	
16	Stuttgarter Kickers	38	13	6	19	57	70	−13	32	
17	Jahn Regensburg	38	8	14	16	48	74	−26	30	
18	FC Schweinfurt 05 (R)	38	9	8	21	50	72	−22	26	Relegation to Oberliga
19	Eintracht Bad Kreuznach (R)	38	8	7	23	49	83	−34	23	Relegation to Oberliga
20	SSV Reutlingen (R)	38	5	3	30	35	99	−64	13	Relegation to Oberliga

Source: Bundesliga.de
Rules for classification: 1) points; 2) goal difference; 3) number of goals scored.
(C) Champions; (P) Promoted; (R) Relegated

=== Results ===
Home \ Away	FCA	EBK	BAY	D98	FSV	FUE	HOF	HOM	M05	M60	FCN	FKP	JRE	R05	FCS	S05	SKI	VFB	SVR	CWA
FC Augsburg	—	3–1	3–4	4–0	2–1	2–3	1–0	1–1	1–1	1–1	0–1	1–2	3–0	1–2	1–2	1–3	4–0	3–1	2–0	0–1
Eintracht Bad Kreuznach	1–0	—	1–2	1–2	0–1	0–0	1–2	0–0	3–1	1–2	1–3	6–3	2–2	6–1	0–2	1–1	0–1	1–2	2–0	6–4
SpVgg Bayreuth	2–0	1–1	—	0–2	4–1	2–1	2–1	0–0	1–1	4–2	3–4	3–0	4–0	3–2	0–0	3–0	3–2	1–0	3–1	2–2
Darmstadt 98	4–1	4–1	0–0	—	1–2	1–3	1–1	0–2	3–1	5–3	2–0	2–1	0–1	4–1	2–0	6–2	4–0	2–3	3–1	4–1
FSV Frankfurt	1–0	1–2	2–1	1–2	—	4–0	2–0	1–0	7–1	3–2	2–1	1–1	1–1	1–0	0–2	2–1	2–1	1–7	0–1	3–2
SpVgg Fürth	2–0	4–0	2–1	0–1	2–0	—	3–0	0–3	4–2	0–2	2–3	4–1	2–0	0–0	2–3	3–0	3–0	3–0	3–0	1–1
Bayern Hof	2–2	2–0	2–1	3–0	1–0	1–0	—	3–2	4–3	0–2	1–1	1–1	1–1	4–2	3–4	2–0	1–2	3–4	1–0	0–1
FC Homburg	1–0	4–0	1–1	2–3	2–1	3–1	3–0	—	7–1	3–0	1–0	3–2	3–3	2–0	1–1	1–0	2–2	1–0	2–1	2–2
Mainz 05	1–3	3–1	2–2	5–2	6–1	1–5	0–1	2–2	—	3–3	3–7	1–0	3–3	4–2	0–0	2–1	1–1	4–2	4–2	2–2
1860 Munich	4–2	3–0	3–0	2–1	3–2	1–0	1–3	2–2	1–3	—	1–0	3–0	3–1	6–0	1–1	3–1	5–0	3–0	1–2	2–1
1. FC Nürnberg	2–1	4–0	2–1	1–0	0–0	3–2	5–1	2–2	3–1	2–0	—	5–4	4–1	3–0	0–0	1–0	5–0	1–0	2–2	0–2
FK Pirmasens	0–0	6–0	0–2	1–1	1–0	1–0	2–0	3–2	3–3	4–1	0–3	—	2–1	2–1	0–2	5–4	1–0	0–2	6–2	1–2
Jahn Regensburg	2–0	2–1	4–2	3–3	1–1	1–2	0–3	2–2	3–3	0–2	0–3	0–0	—	2–1	0–1	1–0	3–1	1–1	1–1	0–2
SSV Reutlingen	0–2	1–3	1–3	2–6	0–1	1–0	1–4	0–2	2–2	1–4	0–1	3–4	2–4	—	0–1	0–2	2–1	0–4	1–3	1–1
1. FC Saarbrücken	2–0	3–0	5–1	3–0	3–0	4–1	2–1	3–0	2–1	2–2	1–0	2–1	2–2	2–1	—	0–0	1–0	4–0	1–1	3–1
1. FC Schweinfurt	3–3	2–2	2–2	2–1	3–0	2–0	1–2	1–3	1–0	0–0	0–2	2–2	2–0	0–1	3–2	—	2–1	2–3	3–4	1–1
Stuttgarter Kickers	1–1	3–3	0–1	6–0	0–0	1–4	2–1	0–1	5–2	4–1	1–1	3–1	2–0	3–0	2–0	4–2	—	2–0	1–2	4–1
VfB Stuttgart	0–1	4–1	1–1	2–3	3–1	2–0	0–1	0–2	0–2	1–1	0–1	5–3	3–0	2–3	1–0	2–0	5–0	—	2–2	2–0
Röchling Völklingen	4–4	1–0	3–3	2–1	3–2	2–1	1–3	2–1	2–4	0–0	4–2	2–1	1–1	4–0	0–0	3–0	3–0	5–3	—	1–0
SV Chio Waldhof	0–3	3–0	1–2	0–0	3–0	3–1	2–1	1–1	0–2	2–2	3–0	5–1	5–1	2–0	0–0	3–1	2–1	1–0	1–4	—

Source: DFB
Legend: Blue = home team win; Yellow = draw; Red = away team win.

=== Top scorers ===
The league's top scorers:

Goals	Player	Team
29	(Germany) Karl-Heinz Granitza	Röchling Völklingen
23	(Germany) Werner Hofmann	SpVgg Fürth
23	(Germany) Ferdinand Keller	TSV 1860 Munich
21	(Germany) Lothar Emmerich	FC Schweinfurt 05
21	(Germany) Dieter Nüssing	1. FC Nürnberg
21	(Germany) Hans Walitza	1. FC Nürnberg
20	(Germany) Hartmut Werner	FC Bayern Hof
19	(Germany) Manfred Lenz	FC 08 Homburg
18	(Germany) Harald Diener	FC 08 Homburg
18	(Germany) Günter Sebert	SV Waldhof Mannheim

== Promotion play-offs ==
The final place in the Bundesliga was contested between the two runners-up in the Nord and Süd divisions. Borussia Dortmund won on aggregate and were promoted to the Bundesliga.

Team 1	Agg.	Team 2	1st leg	2nd leg
1. FC Nürnberg (S)	2–4	Borussia Dortmund (N)	0–1	2–3
