= Udo Böckmann =

German footballer

Personal information
- Full name: Udo Böckmann
- Date of birth: 15 July 1952 (age 74)
- Position: Midfielder

Senior career*
Years	Team	Apps	(Gls)
1970–1972	VfL Bochum II		
1971–1972	VfL Bochum	1	(0)
1975–1976	Bonner SC		
- * Club domestic league appearances and goals

Udo Böckmann (born 15 July 1952) is a retired German football midfielder.
