= Georg Damjanoff =

German footballer

Personal information
- Date of birth: 12 October 1945 (age 81)
- Place of birth: Germany
- Height: 1.83 m (6 ft 0 in)
- Positions: Defender; midfielder

Senior career*
Years	Team	Apps	(Gls)
1965–1970	Tennis Borussia Berlin		
1970–1971	MSV Duisburg	16	(1)
1971–1972	Arminia Bielefeld	30	(5)
1973–1976	Hannover 96	92	(8)
1976–1977	SpVgg Bayreuth	27	(0)
1977–1980	Hannover 96	118	(0)
1980–1981	VfB Oldenburg	21	(2)
- * Club domestic league appearances and goals

Georg Damjanoff (born 12 October 1945) is a retired German footballer.
