= Theo Diegelmann =

German footballer (1939–2026)

Personal information
- Date of birth: 23 November 1939
- Place of birth: Germany
- Date of death: 26 May 2026 (aged 86)
- Position: Goalkeeper

Senior career*
| Years | Team | Apps | (Gls) |
| 1963–1964 | Borussia Fulda | 38 | |
| 1964–1968 | SSV Reutlingen 05 | 134 | (1) |
| 1968–1971 | VfL Bochum | 81 | |
| 1971–1972 | 1. FC Nürnberg | 13 | |
- * Club domestic league appearances and goals

Theo Diegelmann (23 November 1939 – 26 May 2026) was a German footballer who played as a goalkeeper. From 1963 to 1972 he amassed 266 appearances in the Regionalliga, in this time the second tier of the league system in Germany.

== Career ==
Diegelmann could three times qualify for the promotion round to the Bundesliga. The third time he reached the promotion, but he came to no insert in the Bundesliga. The greatest surprise however was the second place with the SSV Reutlingen behind Bayern Munich in the 1964–65 Regionalliga and the second place too in the following promotion round behind Borussia Mönchengladbach – so they were defeated in turn only by the both most famous and successful German clubs of the 1970s.

From 1963 until 1970 Diegelmann was ever first-choice goalkeeper of his clubs.
