= VfB Hermsdorf =

German football club

- Founded: 1899
- Ground: Sportanlage Seebadstraße
- Capacity: 2,000
- League: Landesliga Berlin (VII)
- 2015–16: Berlin-Liga (VI), 16th (relegated)
Home colours	Away colours

VfB Hermsdorf is a German football club from the Hermsdorf district of Berlin. It is part of a larger sports club that has departments for athletics, badminton, basketball, bowling, chess, dance, gymnastics, handball, swimming, table tennis, and tennis.

== History ==
The side was founded as Hermsdorfer Sport Club on 16 June 1916 in the Restaurant Knoblich. With the onset of World War I the club came close to folding as large number of the club's members were called away to the army. In order to continue to play, many of the remaining footballers joined Berliner FC Favorit 1896. After the conflict the club resumed play in 1919, but abandoned their old name to play as Verein für Bewegungsspiele Hermsdorf 1916 in order to avoid being confused with a similarly named tennis club.

Through the 20s and into the early 30s VfB Hermsdorf played second division football for the most part with only a single season appearance 1932–33 in the upper tier Oberliga Berlin. Following the outbreak of World War II it became increasingly difficult to field a side and the club suspended play in 1943.

VfB and Turn- und Sportvereininigung 1899 Hermsdorf were brought together following the war on 1 June 1945 as Sportgruppe Hermsdorf. TSV was the product of the 1920 merger of Deutscher Turnverein Theodor Körner Hermsdorf (14 June 1866) and Turnverein Jahn Hermsdorf (1906). In May 1947 the club re-adopted its traditional name.

After a number of seasons in lower division play Hermsdorf climbed to the Amateurliga Berlin (II) in 1955 where they had an unremarkable eight-year run. Following the establishment of the Bundesliga, Germany's new professional first division league, the country's football competition was re-structured and Hermsdorf became a third division side. They qualified for the Regionalliga Berlin (II) in 1965 and played at that level for three seasons before being relegated to the Amateurliga Berlin (III) and then slipping to lower level play by the late 60s. VfB Hermsdorf made a single season re-appearance in the Amateurliga in 1970–71 before falling to lower level local competition.

The club won its way back to the Verbandsliga Berlin (V) in 1998 and played at that level until 2016 when it was relegated to the Landesliga.

== Honours ==
The club's honours:

- Berliner Landespokal
  - Runners-up: 2008

== Stadium ==
From 1916 to 1919, Hermsdorf played at Schulzendorfer Straße before moving on to the Waldseesportplatz from 1919 to 1945. Since the end of the war the club has been based at Seebadstaße which has a capacity of 2,000.
