= 1. FC Mülheim =

German football club

FC Mülheim
- Full name: 1.FC Mülheim-Styrum 1923 e.V.
- Nickname: Die Löwen (the Lions)
- Founded: 24 June 1923
- Ground: Städt. Sportanlage Moritzstraße.
- League: Bezirksliga Niederrhein Gruppe 6 (VII) season = 2023-24
- 6th
Home colours	Away colours

FC Mülheim is a German association football club based in Mülheim an der Ruhr, North Rhine-Westphalia.

== History ==
Spielvereinigung Oberhausen und Styrum was established through the union of a number of local sports clubs including Styrumer Spielverein 08, Styrum 08 and Oberhausener Spielverein. An attempt to form a football side within the association led to the creation of an independent club, Erster Fußballclub Mülheim-Ruhr-Styrum, in July 1923. The team began play in the Westdeutschen Spielverband over the objections of its parent.

1. FC Mülheim-Styrum played lower-tier ball for much of the period leading up to World War II, advancing as far as second-tier play just before the conflict broke out. The team was able to carry on until 1943 when they suspended play due to the war. After the war, they became part of the Landesliga Niederrhein (III), and later the Verbandsliga Niederrhein (III), before disappearing into lower level play in 1958. They won promotion to the Amateurliga Niederrhein (III) in 1971, capturing the title there that same season. A successful promotion playoff put the team through to the Regionalliga West (II). After the 1973–74 season, German football was restructured; the second tier 2. Bundesliga was introduced and the Regionalligen replaced by the Amateuroberligen (III). Mülheim's fourth place result was not good enough to qualify the team for the new second division circuit, but they were still able to join the 2. Bundesliga-Nord when Blau-Weiß 90 Berlin refused the promotion they had earned through their third place finish in the Regionalliga Berlin (II). The club changed its name to 1. FC Mülheim after the 1974–75 season and were sent down after a 17th place finish in their next campaign. That was followed by a 17th place finish in the Amateurliga Niederrhein (III) and relegation to lower tier competition. Despite these failures, they made appearances in the early rounds of the German Cup from 1975 to 1977. Mülheim currently plays in the Bezirksliga Niederrhein (VI) after promotion in season 2022/23.

== Former players ==
- Holger Osieck, went on to become Beckenbauer's assistant at the 1990 World Cup
- Nobert Eilenfeldt, played over 200 Bundesliga matches, scoring 48 goals
