= TSR Olympia Wilhelmshaven =

German sports club

- Full name: TSR Olympia Wilhelmshaven
- Founded: 1947
- Dissolved: 2009 (football section)
- League: inactive
Home colours	Away colours

TSR Olympia Wilhelmshaven is a German sports club based in Wilhelmshaven, Lower Saxony, on the northwestern coast of the country. The football team was a department of the club which also offers its members American football, athletics, table tennis, and triathlon.

== History ==
Only a small local side, the footballers nonetheless played a half dozen seasons in the second division Regionalliga Nord through the early 1970s. They joined the newly formed 2. Bundesliga Nord for the 1974–75 season when a re-structured second division circuit was created from the best performing and most financially stable clubs of the era's five Regionalliga. A middling club at best in their old division, Wilhelmshaven finished 17th in the re-organized competition and was relegated to the tier III Amateur Oberliga Nord.

In 1992 the sports clubs TSR Olympia Wilhelmshaven and SV Wilhelmshaven merged for economic reasons. Olympia's football department withdrew to play in the local city circuit. In 2000 the German Football Association (Deutscher Fussball Bund or German Football Association) refused a proposed re-union with what was now known as SV Wilhelmshaven 92 which was struggling financially.

For the 2009/2010 season the football section of TSR Olympia left the club and joined the football section of WSSV Wilhelmshaven to form FC Olympia 09 Wilhelmshaven. Since then, football is no longer offered by TSR.

== Honours ==
The club's honours:

- Lower Saxony Cup
  - Winners: 1960
- Amateurliga Niedersachsen-West
  - Champions: 1956, 1964
