= Hamborn 07 =

German football club

- Full name: Sportfreunde Hamborn 07 Fußballabteilung e. V.
- Founded: 1954
- Ground: Sportanlage Im Holtkamp, Duisburg
- Capacity: 5,000
- Coach: Marcel Stenzel
- League: Landesliga Niederrhein 2
- 2025–26: 3rd
- Website: http://www.sportfreunde-hamborn-07.de/
Home colours	Away colours

The Sportfreunde Hamborn 07 are a German association football club based in Hamborn, a district in the north of Duisburg.

== History ==
The club has its origin in 1903, when the Ballspiel-Club Hamborn was founded, which merged four years later with the SV Marxloh to the SV Hamborn 07. In 1954, the current club was created after the merger of SV Hamborn 07 and the Sportfreunde Hamborn.

Before the formation of the Bundesliga, the SV Hamborn 07 competed in the Oberliga West division. Their highest finish in the league was in 1948, when they finished in 4th place.

The club now plays in the tier seven Bezirksliga Niederrhein after relegation from the Oberliga Niederrhein in 2013 and the Landesliga Niederrhein in 2014.

== Recent seasons ==
The recent season-by-season performance of the club:

Season	Division	Tier	Position
1947–48	Oberliga West	I	4th
1948–49	Oberliga West	I	6th
1949–50	Oberliga West	I	9th
1950–51	Oberliga West	I	7th
1951–52	Oberliga West	I	16th ↓
1952–53	2. Oberliga West	II	10th
1953–54	2. Oberliga West	II	7th
1954–55	2. Oberliga West	II	2nd ↑
1955–56	Oberliga West	I	16th ↓
1956–57	2. Oberliga West	II	1st ↑
1957–58	Oberliga West	I	16th ↓
1958–59	2. Oberliga West	II	1st ↑
1959–60	Oberliga West	I	12th
1960–61	Oberliga West	I	7th
1961–62	Oberliga West	I	12th
1962–63	Oberliga West	I	12th ↓
1963–64	Regionalliga West	II	14th
1964–65	Regionalliga West	II	14th
1965–66	Regionalliga West	II	8th
1966–67	Regionalliga West	II	5th
1967–68	Regionalliga West	II	9th
1968–69	Regionalliga West	II	11th
1969–70	Regionalliga West	II	16th
1970–71	Regionalliga West	II	18th ↓
1971–72	Verbandsliga Niederrhein	III	16th ↓
1972–73	Landesliga Niederrhein 3	IV	10th
1973–74	Landesliga Niederrhein 3	IV	6th
1974–75	Landesliga Niederrhein 3	IV	14th ↓
1975–76		V	
1976–77		V	↑
1977–78	Landesliga Niederrhein 3	IV	3rd
1978–79	Verbandsliga Niederrhein	IV	5th
1979–80	Verbandsliga Niederrhein	IV	1st ↑
1980–81	Oberliga Nordrhein	III	2nd
1981–82	Oberliga Nordrhein	III	9th
1982–83	Oberliga Nordrhein	III	13th
1983–84	Oberliga Nordrhein	III	15th ↓
1984–85	Verbandsliga Niederrhein	IV	1st ↑
1985–86	Oberliga Nordrhein	III	9th
1986–87	Oberliga Nordrhein	III	9th
1987–88	Oberliga Nordrhein	III	4th
1988–89	Oberliga Nordrhein	III	12th
1989–90	Oberliga Nordrhein	III	7th
1990–91	Oberliga Nordrhein	III	8th
1991–92	Oberliga Nordrhein	III	4th
1992–93	Oberliga Nordrhein	III	13th
1993–94	Oberliga Nordrhein	III	15th ↓
1994–95	Oberliga Nordrhein	IV	16th ↓
1995–96	Verbandsliga Niederrhein	V	15th ↓
1996–97	Landesliga Niederrhein 3	VI	1st ↑
1997–98	Verbandsliga Niederrhein	V	5th
1998–99	Verbandsliga Niederrhein	V	9th
1999–2000	Verbandsliga Niederrhein	V	6th
2000–01	Verbandsliga Niederrhein	V	2nd ↑
2001–02	Oberliga Nordrhein	IV	16th ↓
2002–03	Verbandsliga Niederrhein	V	10th
2003–04	Verbandsliga Niederrhein	V	13th
2004–05	Verbandsliga Niederrhein	V	11th
2005–06	Verbandsliga Niederrhein	V	13th
2006–07	Verbandsliga Niederrhein	V	15th ↓
2007–08	Landesliga Niederrhein 3	VI	13th ↓↓
2008–09	Bezirksliga Niedderhein 8	VIII	1st ↑
2009–10	Landesliga Niedderhein 3	VII	3rd
2010–11	Landesliga Niedderhein 3	VII	1st ↑
2011–12	Niederrheinliga	VI	15th ↑
2012–13	Oberliga Niederrhein	V	20th ↓
2013–14	Landesliga Niederrhein 3	VI	14th ↓
2014–15	Bezirksliga Niederrhein 6	VII	4th
2015–16	Bezirksliga Niederrhein 5	VII	3rd
2016–17	Bezirksliga Niederrhein 5	VII	1st ↑
2017–18	Landesliga Niederrhein 2	VI	15th ↓
2018–19	Bezirksliga Niederrhein 4	VII	1st ↑
2019–20	Landesliga Niederrhein 1	VI	14th
2020–21	Landesliga Niederrhein 3	VI	11th
2021–22	Landesliga Niederrhein 3	VI	1st ↑
2022–23	Oberliga Niederrhein	V	10th
2023–24	Oberliga Niederrhein	V	17th ↓
2024–25	Landesliga Niederrhein 2	VI	6th
2025–26	Landesliga Niederrhein 2	VI	
