= 1966–67 Regionalliga =

Regionalliga
- Season: 1966–67
- Champions: Arminia Hannover Hertha BSC Berlin Alemannia Aachen Borussia Neunkirchen Kickers Offenbach
- Promoted: Alemannia Aachen Borussia Neunkirchen
- Relegated: VfV Hildesheim Bremer SV SC Staaken Lichterfelder SU SSV Hagen Hammer SpVg Bonner SC Eintracht Duisburg TuS Neuendorf Phönix Bellheim Germania Metternich BC Augsburg Germania Wiesbaden: 1. FC Pforzheim

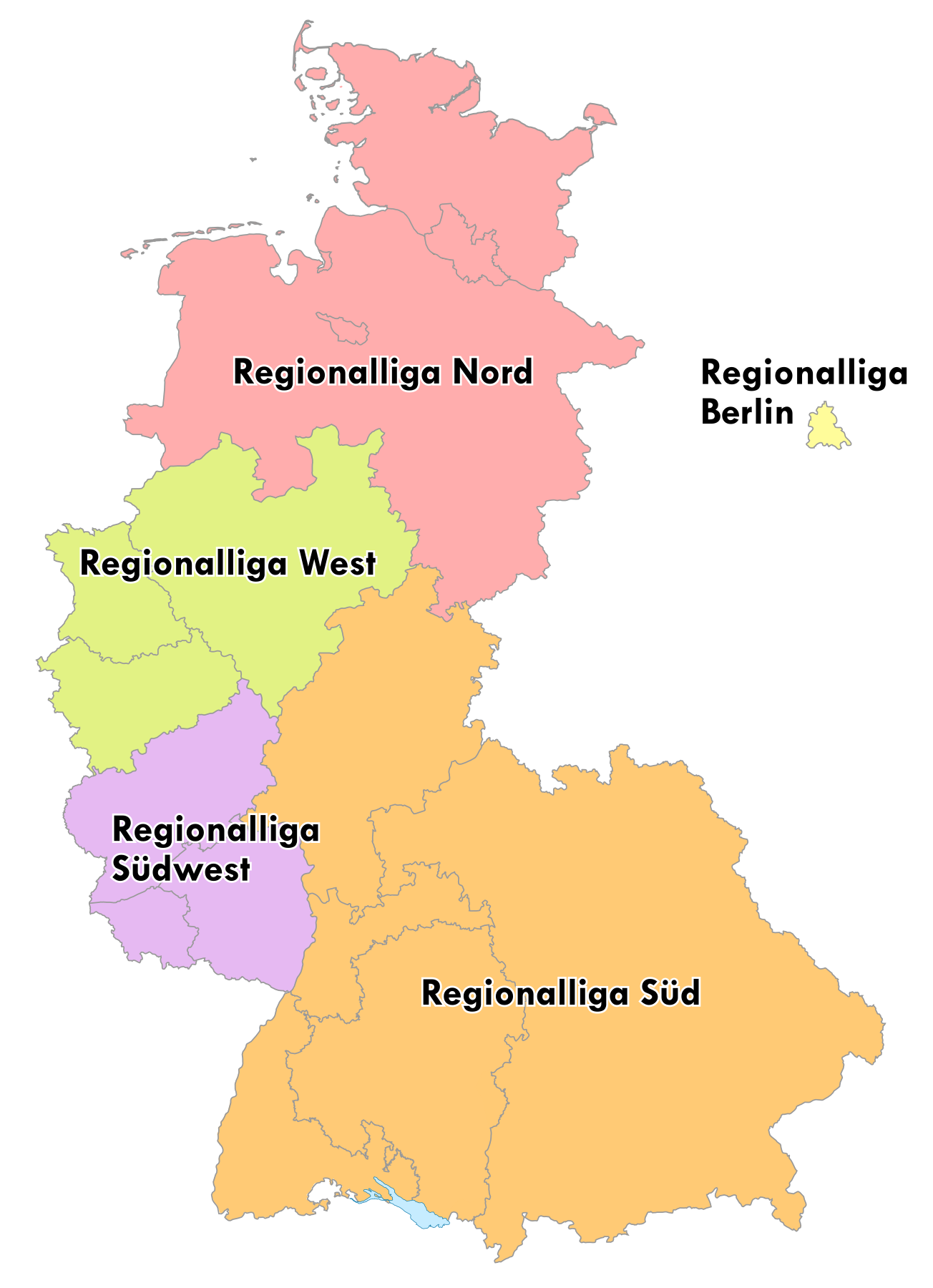
Map of the five German Regionalligas from 1963 to 1974

The 1966–67 Regionalliga was the fourth season of the Regionalliga, the second tier of the German football league system. The league operated in five regional divisions, Berlin, North, South, Southwest and West. The five league champions and all five runners-up, at the end of the season, entered a promotion play-off to determine the two clubs to move up to the Bundesliga for the next season. The two promotion spots went to the Regionalliga Berlin and Regionalliga Südwest champions Alemannia Aachen and Borussia Neunkirchen.

== Regionalliga Nord ==
The 1966–67 season saw two new clubs in the league, HSV Barmbeck-Uhlenhorst and SC Sperber Hamburg, both promoted from the Amateurliga, while no club had been relegated from the Bundesliga to the league.

Pos	Team	Pld	W	D	L	GF	GA	GD	Pts	Promotion, qualification or relegation
1	Arminia Hannover	32	21	5	6	78	28	+50	47	Qualification to promotion playoffs
2	Göttingen 05	32	18	9	5	65	24	+41	45	Qualification to promotion playoffs
3	Holstein Kiel	32	19	7	6	68	32	+36	45	
4	VfL Wolfsburg	32	19	2	11	57	33	+24	40	
5	FC St. Pauli	32	16	7	9	71	44	+27	39	
6	Concordia Hamburg	32	16	4	12	50	40	+10	36	
7	VfL Osnabrück	32	11	10	11	61	50	+11	32	
8	FC Altona 93	32	10	11	11	43	46	−3	31	
9	VfB Oldenburg	32	13	4	15	49	73	−24	30	
10	VfB Lübeck	32	9	10	13	41	43	−2	28	
11	ASV Bergedorf 85	32	10	8	14	45	57	−12	28	
12	Itzehoer SV	32	13	2	17	56	74	−18	28	
13	SC Sperber Hamburg	32	8	9	15	42	54	−12	25	
14	HSV Barmbek-Uhlenhorst	32	10	5	17	48	77	−29	25	
15	TuS Bremerhaven 93	32	7	10	15	34	57	−23	24	
16	VfV Hildesheim (R)	32	8	7	17	25	57	−32	23	Relegation to Amateurliga
17	Bremer SV (R)	32	7	4	21	40	84	−44	18	Relegation to Amateurliga

Source: Fussballdaten.de (in German)
Rules for classification: 1) Points;
(R) Relegated

== Regionalliga Berlin ==
The 1966–67 season saw three new clubs in the league, Rapide Wedding and Kickers 1900 Berlin, both promoted from the Amateurliga, while Tasmania 1900 Berlin had been relegated from the Bundesliga to the league.

Pos	Team	Pld	W	D	L	GF	GA	GD	Pts	Promotion, qualification or relegation
1	Hertha BSC Berlin	30	28	1	1	114	25	+89	57	Qualification to promotion playoffs
2	Tennis Borussia Berlin	30	22	6	2	101	30	+71	50	Qualification to promotion playoffs
3	Spandauer SV	30	18	5	7	61	42	+19	41	
4	Tasmania 1900 Berlin	30	16	7	7	53	31	+22	39	
5	Hertha Zehlendorf	30	17	4	9	56	41	+15	38	
6	Wacker 04 Berlin	30	15	5	10	63	46	+17	35	
7	Rapide Wedding	30	10	6	14	42	58	−16	26	
8	VfB Hermsdorf	30	10	5	15	52	81	−29	25	
9	Berliner SV 92	30	9	6	15	37	49	−12	24	
10	1. FC Neukölln	30	8	8	14	42	65	−23	24	
11	Blau-Weiß 90 Berlin	30	6	11	13	32	55	−23	23	
12	BFC Südring Berlin	30	6	10	14	44	59	−15	22	
13	Reinickendorfer Füchse	30	7	8	15	39	57	−18	22	
14	Kickers 1900 Berlin	30	6	10	14	49	79	−30	22	
15	SC Staaken (R)	30	6	8	16	36	53	−17	20	Relegation to Amateurliga
16	Lichterfelder SU (R)	30	4	4	22	42	92	−50	12	Relegation to Amateurliga

Source: Fussballdaten.de (in German)
Rules for classification: 1) Points;
(R) Relegated

== Regionalliga West ==
The 1966–67 season saw four new clubs in the league, VfR Neuß, SSV Hagen, Hammer SpVg and Bonner SC, all promoted from the Amateurliga, while no club had been relegated from the Bundesliga to the league.

Pos	Team	Pld	W	D	L	GF	GA	GD	Pts	Promotion, qualification or relegation
1	Alemannia Aachen (P)	34	20	8	6	56	24	+32	48	Qualification to promotion playoffs
2	Schwarz-Weiß Essen	34	19	9	6	51	23	+28	47	Qualification to promotion playoffs
3	Arminia Bielefeld	34	17	11	6	72	39	+33	45	
4	VfL Bochum	34	18	9	7	67	42	+25	45	
5	Sportfreunde Hamborn	34	17	9	8	52	33	+19	43	
6	Rot-Weiß Oberhausen	34	13	14	7	67	52	+15	40	
7	Wuppertaler SV	34	14	10	10	49	41	+8	38	
8	VfR Neuß	34	14	8	12	56	50	+6	36	
9	Preußen Münster	34	13	9	12	53	58	−5	35	
10	Bayer Leverkusen	34	12	8	14	57	62	−5	32	
11	Westfalia Herne	34	12	7	15	41	41	0	31	
12	Eintracht Gelsenkirchen	34	10	10	14	48	53	−5	30	
13	Viktoria Köln	34	10	9	15	36	39	−3	29	
14	TSV Marl-Hüls	34	7	12	15	38	49	−11	26	
15	SSV Hagen (R)	34	8	8	18	35	69	−34	24	Relegation to Amateurliga
16	Hammer SpVg (R)	34	7	9	18	45	76	−31	23	Relegation to Amateurliga
17	Bonner SC (R)	34	6	10	18	27	48	−21	22	Relegation to Amateurliga
18	Eintracht Duisburg (R)	34	7	4	23	34	85	−51	18	Relegation to Amateurliga

Source: Fussballdaten.de (in German)
Rules for classification: 1) Points;
(P) Promoted; (R) Relegated

== Regionalliga Südwest ==
The 1966–67 season saw three new clubs in the league, FC Homburg and Germania Metternich, both promoted from the Amateurliga, while Borussia Neunkirchen had been relegated from the Bundesliga to the league.

Pos	Team	Pld	W	D	L	GF	GA	GD	Pts	Promotion, qualification or relegation
1	Borussia Neunkirchen (P)	30	20	6	4	73	27	+46	46	Qualification to promotion playoffs
2	1. FC Saarbrücken	30	21	2	7	77	31	+46	44	Qualification to promotion playoffs
3	SpVgg Weisenau	30	17	7	6	63	35	+28	41	
4	FSV Mainz 05	30	18	3	9	50	35	+15	39	
5	Eintracht Trier	30	15	8	7	67	48	+19	38	
6	FK Pirmasens	30	14	8	8	60	31	+29	36	
7	Südwest Ludwigshafen	30	13	10	7	49	34	+15	36	
8	SV Alsenborn	30	13	6	11	58	43	+15	32	
9	Röchling Völklingen	30	12	7	11	42	46	−4	31	
10	Saar 05 Saarbrücken	30	11	8	11	47	39	+8	30	
11	FC Homburg	30	8	7	15	46	81	−35	23	
12	VfR Frankenthal	30	7	7	16	40	50	−10	21	
13	Wormatia Worms	30	5	11	14	31	48	−17	21	
14	TuS Neuendorf	30	8	5	17	35	64	−29	21	
15	Phönix Bellheim (R)	30	6	6	18	40	71	−31	18	Relegation to Amateurliga
16	Germania Metternich (R)	30	0	3	27	19	114	−95	3	Relegation to Amateurliga

Source: Fussballdaten.de (in German)
Rules for classification: 1) Points;
(P) Promoted; (R) Relegated

== Regionalliga Süd ==
The 1966–67 season saw three new clubs in the league, FC 08 Villingen, Germania Wiesbaden and BC Augsburg, all promoted from the Amateurliga, while no club had been relegated from the Bundesliga to the league.

Pos	Team	Pld	W	D	L	GF	GA	GD	Pts	Promotion, qualification or relegation
1	Kickers Offenbach	34	20	10	4	65	33	+32	50	Qualification to promotion playoffs
2	FC Bayern Hof	34	21	8	5	81	44	+37	50	Qualification to promotion playoffs
3	SpVgg Fürth	34	20	8	6	80	36	+44	48	
4	Stuttgarter Kickers	34	20	5	9	85	48	+37	45	
5	VfR Mannheim	34	15	12	7	61	43	+18	42	
6	SSV Reutlingen	34	16	8	10	59	44	+15	40	
7	Freiburger FC	34	15	7	12	62	50	+12	37	
8	KSV Hessen Kassel	34	14	8	12	61	62	−1	36	
9	Schwaben Augsburg	34	13	8	13	64	63	+1	34	
10	FC Schweinfurt 05	34	16	2	16	43	47	−4	34	
11	SV Waldhof Mannheim	34	12	9	13	50	57	−7	33	
12	Opel Rüsselsheim	34	12	4	18	51	60	−9	28	
13	FSV Frankfurt	34	12	4	18	37	58	−21	28	
14	Darmstadt 98	34	9	8	17	45	55	−10	26	
15	FC 08 Villingen	34	10	6	18	47	76	−29	26	
16	BC Augsburg (R)	34	10	5	19	49	73	−24	25	Relegation to Amateurliga
17	Germania Wiesbaden (R)	34	4	9	21	28	73	−45	17	Relegation to Amateurliga
18	1. FC Pforzheim (R)	34	3	7	24	26	72	−46	13	Relegation to Amateurliga

Source: Fussballdaten.de (in German)
Rules for classification: 1) Points;
(R) Relegated

== Bundesliga promotion round ==
=== Group 1 ===
Pos	Team	Pld	W	D	L	GF	GA	GD	Pts	Promotion, qualification or relegation
1	Borussia Neunkirchen (P)	8	5	1	2	17	12	+5	11	Promotion to Bundesliga
2	Schwarz-Weiß Essen	8	4	2	2	13	9	+4	10	
3	Arminia Hannover	8	3	1	4	14	14	0	7	
4	FC Bayern Hof	8	3	1	4	11	16	−5	7	
5	Hertha BSC Berlin	8	2	1	5	8	12	−4	5	

Source: Fussballdaten.de (in German)
Rules for classification: 1) Points;
(P) Promoted

=== Group 2 ===
Pos	Team	Pld	W	D	L	GF	GA	GD	Pts	Promotion, qualification or relegation
1	Alemannia Aachen (P)	8	6	0	2	23	14	+9	12	Promotion to Bundesliga
2	Kickers Offenbach	8	4	2	2	15	10	+5	10	
3	1. FC Saarbrücken	8	2	4	2	15	15	0	8	
4	Göttingen 05	8	1	4	3	9	13	−4	6	
5	Tennis Borussia Berlin	8	1	2	5	12	21	−9	4	

Source: Fussballdaten.de (in German)
Rules for classification: 1) Points;
(P) Promoted
