= 1967–68 Regionalliga =

Regionalliga
- Season: 1967–68
- Champions: Arminia Hannover Hertha BSC Berlin Bayer Leverkusen SV Alsenborn FC Bayern Hof
- Promoted: Hertha BSC Berlin Kickers Offenbach
- Relegated: FC Altona 93 TuS Haste Sportfreunde Neukölln VfB Hermsdorf Westfalia Herne VfB Bottrop SC Friedrichsthal SC Ludwigshafen SSV Mülheim FSV Frankfurt TSG Backnang SV Wiesbaden

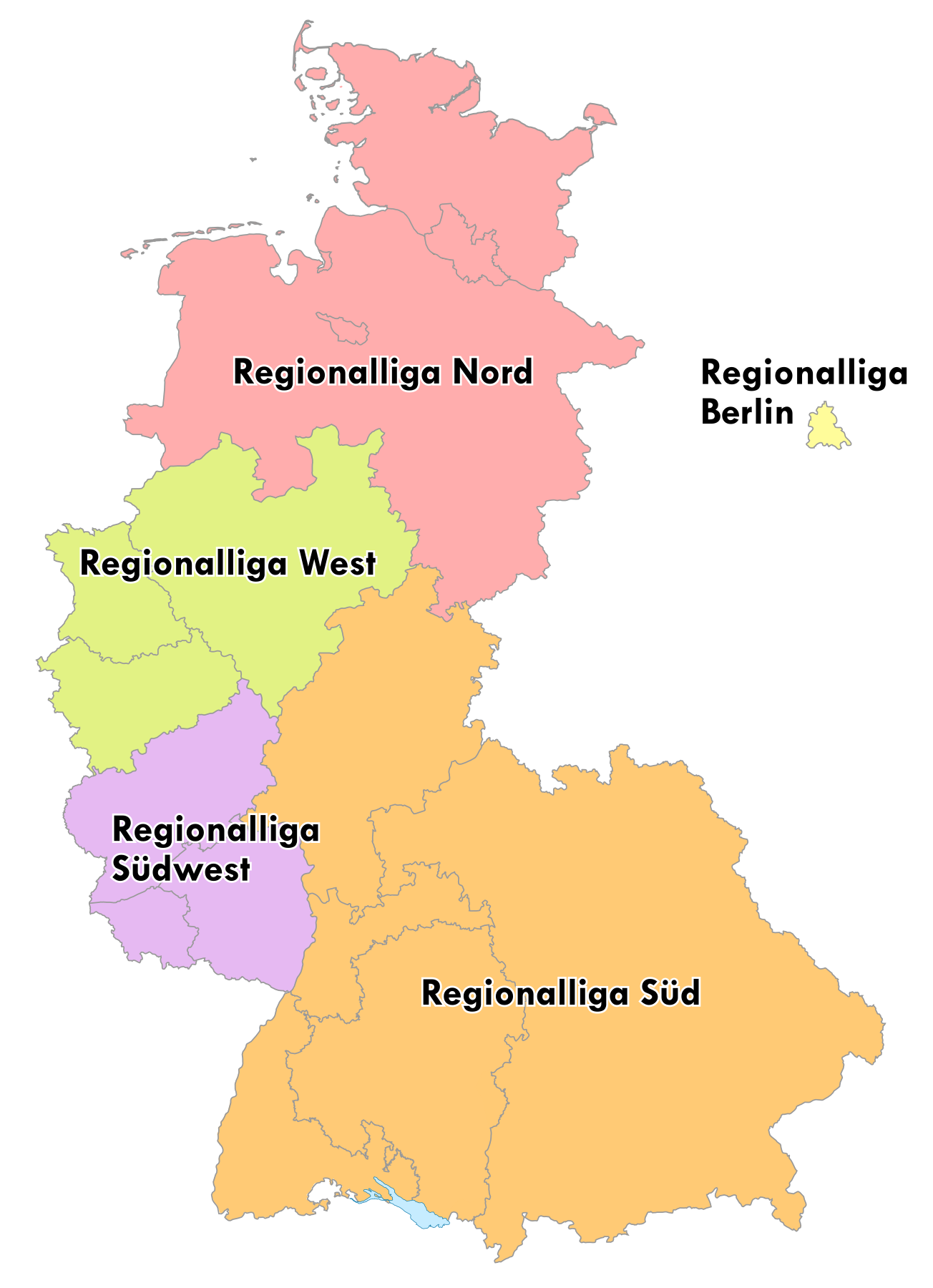
Map of the five German Regionalligas from 1963 to 1974

The 1967–68 Regionalliga was the fifth season of the Regionalliga, the second tier of the German football league system. The league operated in five regional divisions, Berlin, North, South, Southwest and West. The five league champions and all five runners-up, at the end of the season, entered a promotion play-off to determine the two clubs to move up to the Bundesliga for the next season. The two promotion spots went to the Regionalliga Berlin champions Hertha BSC Berlin and Regionalliga Süd runners-up Kickers Offenbach.

== Regionalliga Nord ==
The 1967–68 season saw two new clubs in the league, Phönix Lübeck and TuS Haste, both promoted from the Amateurliga, while no club had been relegated from the Bundesliga to the league.

Pos	Team	Pld	W	D	L	GF	GA	GD	Pts	Promotion, qualification or relegation
1	Arminia Hannover	32	20	4	8	64	25	+39	44	Qualification to promotion playoffs
2	Göttingen 05	32	20	4	8	66	36	+30	44	Qualification to promotion playoffs
3	VfL Wolfsburg	32	17	9	6	61	34	+27	43	
4	FC St. Pauli	32	17	7	8	60	30	+30	41	
5	TuS Bremerhaven 93	32	17	5	10	48	53	−5	39	
6	Phönix Lübeck	32	15	7	10	49	39	+10	37	
7	VfL Osnabrück	32	13	8	11	51	43	+8	34	
8	Holstein Kiel	32	14	5	13	47	37	+10	33	
9	VfB Lübeck	32	13	7	12	44	41	+3	33	
10	SC Sperber Hamburg	32	13	6	13	53	63	−10	32	
11	VfB Oldenburg	32	10	10	12	49	49	0	30	
12	Itzehoer SV	32	10	7	15	50	64	−14	27	
13	Concordia Hamburg	32	10	3	19	42	52	−10	23	
14	HSV Barmbek-Uhlenhorst	32	10	3	19	56	79	−23	23	
15	ASV Bergedorf 85	32	8	6	18	31	54	−23	22	
16	FC Altona 93 (R)	32	8	4	20	37	78	−41	20	Relegation to Amateurliga
17	TuS Haste (R)	32	8	3	21	40	71	−31	19	Relegation to Amateurliga

Source: Fussballdaten.de (in German)
Rules for classification: 1) Points;
(R) Relegated

== Regionalliga Berlin ==
The 1967–68 season saw two new clubs in the league, Alemannia 90 Berlin and Sportfreunde Neukölln, both promoted from the Amateurliga, while no club had been relegated from the Bundesliga to the league.

Pos	Team	Pld	W	D	L	GF	GA	GD	Pts	Promotion, qualification or relegation
1	Hertha BSC Berlin (P)	30	26	3	1	104	11	+93	55	Qualification to promotion playoffs
2	Tennis Borussia Berlin	30	23	4	3	108	29	+79	50	Qualification to promotion playoffs
3	Hertha Zehlendorf	30	18	5	7	69	45	+24	41	
4	Wacker 04 Berlin	30	17	6	7	90	58	+32	40	
5	Tasmania 1900 Berlin	30	12	11	7	57	32	+25	35	
6	BFC Südring Berlin	30	12	7	11	51	42	+9	31	
7	Spandauer SV	30	12	6	12	62	53	+9	30	
8	Blau-Weiß 90 Berlin	30	12	6	12	43	47	−4	30	
9	Berliner SV 92	30	8	10	12	46	59	−13	26	
10	Alemannia 90 Berlin	30	8	9	13	44	58	−14	25	
11	Reinickendorfer Füchse	30	9	6	15	51	68	−17	24	
12	1. FC Neukölln	30	8	8	14	41	66	−25	24	
13	Rapide Wedding	30	7	7	16	51	72	−21	21	
14	Kickers 1900 Berlin	30	7	6	17	29	69	−40	20	
15	Sportfreunde Neukölln (R)	30	6	3	21	32	111	−79	15	Relegation to Amateurliga
16	VfB Hermsdorf (R)	30	4	5	21	39	97	−58	13	Relegation to Amateurliga

Source: Fussballdaten.de (in German)
Rules for classification: 1) Points;
(P) Promoted; (R) Relegated

== Regionalliga West ==
The 1967–68 season saw five new clubs in the league, Fortuna Köln, VfB Bottrop and Lüner SV, all three promoted from the Amateurliga, while Rot-Weiß Essen and Fortuna Düsseldorf had been relegated from the Bundesliga to the league.

Pos	Team	Pld	W	D	L	GF	GA	GD	Pts	Promotion, qualification or relegation
1	Bayer Leverkusen	34	22	8	4	70	32	+38	52	Qualification to promotion playoffs
2	Rot-Weiß Essen	34	22	8	4	73	55	+18	52	Qualification to promotion playoffs
3	Rot-Weiß Oberhausen	34	23	5	6	77	32	+45	51	
4	Arminia Bielefeld	34	19	8	7	77	44	+33	46	
5	VfL Bochum	34	18	6	10	65	32	+33	42	
6	Fortuna Düsseldorf	34	11	13	10	65	49	+16	35	
7	Schwarz-Weiß Essen	34	12	11	11	56	46	+10	35	
8	Lüner SV	34	13	7	14	46	65	−19	33	
9	Sportfreunde Hamborn	34	11	9	14	60	61	−1	31	
10	Viktoria Köln	34	12	7	15	48	51	−3	31	
11	TSV Marl-Hüls	34	12	7	15	49	56	−7	31	
12	VfR Neuß	34	12	7	15	51	61	−10	31	
13	Preußen Münster	34	10	9	15	45	50	−5	29	
14	Eintracht Gelsenkirchen	34	11	7	16	43	56	−13	29	
15	Wuppertaler SV	34	10	8	16	31	51	−20	28	
16	Fortuna Köln	34	7	9	18	45	81	−36	23	
17	Westfalia Herne (R)	34	6	7	21	27	74	−47	19	Relegation to Amateurliga
18	VfB Bottrop (R)	34	3	8	23	20	72	−52	14	Relegation to Amateurliga

Source: Fussballdaten.de (in German)
Rules for classification: 1) Points;
(R) Relegated

== Regionalliga Südwest ==
The 1967–68 season saw three new clubs in the league, SC Friedrichsthal, SC Ludwigshafen and SSV Mülheim, all three promoted from the Amateurliga, while no club had been relegated from the Bundesliga to the league.

Pos	Team	Pld	W	D	L	GF	GA	GD	Pts	Promotion, qualification or relegation
1	SV Alsenborn	30	24	3	3	87	21	+66	51	Qualification to promotion playoffs
2	TuS Neuendorf	30	18	6	6	66	29	+37	42	Qualification to promotion playoffs
3	FK Pirmasens	30	18	5	7	57	31	+26	41	
4	FSV Mainz 05	30	15	8	7	57	32	+25	38	
5	1. FC Saarbrücken	30	12	10	8	55	37	+18	34	
6	Südwest Ludwigshafen	30	13	7	10	45	32	+13	33	
7	Röchling Völklingen	30	12	9	9	53	47	+6	33	
8	Eintracht Trier	30	11	10	9	57	46	+11	32	
9	Saar 05 Saarbrücken	30	12	7	11	32	35	−3	31	
10	FC Homburg	30	11	8	11	41	53	−12	30	
11	SV Weisenau Mainz	30	10	7	13	42	60	−18	27	
12	Wormatia Worms	30	8	9	13	34	40	−6	25	
13	VfR Frankenthal	30	9	7	14	35	63	−28	25	
14	SC Friedrichsthal (R)	30	8	5	17	42	60	−18	21	Relegation to Amateurliga
15	SC Ludwigshafen (R)	30	3	4	23	27	90	−63	10	Relegation to Amateurliga
16	SSV Mülheim (R)	30	2	3	25	22	76	−54	7	Relegation to Amateurliga

Source: Fussballdaten.de (in German)
Rules for classification: 1) Points;
(R) Relegated

== Regionalliga Süd ==
The 1967–68 season saw three new clubs in the league, Jahn Regensburg, SV Wiesbaden and TSG Backnang, all three promoted from the Amateurliga, while no club had been relegated from the Bundesliga to the league.

Pos	Team	Pld	W	D	L	GF	GA	GD	Pts	Promotion, qualification or relegation
1	FC Bayern Hof	34	23	8	3	85	36	+49	54	Qualification to promotion playoffs
2	Kickers Offenbach (P)	34	21	11	2	75	27	+48	53	Qualification to promotion playoffs
3	SSV Reutlingen	34	22	1	11	77	39	+38	45	
4	Stuttgarter Kickers	34	20	4	10	75	51	+24	44	
5	FC Schweinfurt 05	34	16	9	9	55	48	+7	41	
6	VfR Mannheim	34	15	8	11	75	55	+20	38	
7	SpVgg Fürth	34	17	4	13	48	39	+9	38	
8	KSV Hessen Kassel	34	15	7	12	64	63	+1	37	
9	Freiburger FC	34	14	8	12	57	56	+1	36	
10	FC 08 Villingen	34	12	11	11	41	43	−2	35	
11	Opel Rüsselsheim	34	12	7	15	59	60	−1	31	
12	SV Waldhof Mannheim	34	12	6	16	55	62	−7	30	
13	Schwaben Augsburg	34	10	8	16	47	54	−7	28	
14	SV Darmstadt 98	34	8	8	18	45	71	−26	24	
15	Jahn Regensburg	34	8	6	20	37	77	−40	22	
16	FSV Frankfurt (R)	34	5	10	19	37	61	−24	20	Relegation to Amateurliga
17	TSG Backnang (R)	34	4	10	20	45	94	−49	18	Relegation to Amateurliga
18	SV Wiesbaden (R)	34	4	10	20	37	78	−41	18	Relegation to Amateurliga

Source: Fussballdaten.de (in German)
Rules for classification: 1) Points;
(P) Promoted; (R) Relegated

== Bundesliga promotion round ==
=== Group 1 ===
Pos	Team	Pld	W	D	L	GF	GA	GD	Pts	Promotion, qualification or relegation
1	Kickers Offenbach (P)	8	5	2	1	16	7	+9	12	Promotion to Bundesliga
2	Bayer Leverkusen	8	3	4	1	17	10	+7	10	
3	TuS Neuendorf	8	1	5	2	6	8	−2	7	
4	Tennis Borussia Berlin	8	3	1	4	11	19	−8	7	
5	Arminia Hannover	8	1	2	5	7	13	−6	4	

Source: Fussballdaten.de (in German)
Rules for classification: 1) Points;
(P) Promoted

=== Group 2 ===
Pos	Team	Pld	W	D	L	GF	GA	GD	Pts	Promotion, qualification or relegation
1	Hertha BSC Berlin (P)	8	4	3	1	12	7	+5	11	Promotion to Bundesliga
2	Rot-Weiß Essen	8	3	3	2	9	9	0	9	
3	SV Alsenborn	8	3	2	3	12	14	−2	8	
4	Göttingen 05	8	3	1	4	10	11	−1	7	
5	FC Bayern Hof	8	1	2	5	12	14	−2	4	

Source: Fussballdaten.de (in German)
Rules for classification: 1) Points;
(P) Promoted
