= 1968–69 Regionalliga =

Regionalliga
- Season: 1968–69
- Champions: VfL Osnabrück Hertha Zehlendorf Rot-Weiß Oberhausen SV Alsenborn Karlsruher SC
- Promoted: Rot-Weiß Oberhausen Rot-Weiß Essen
- Relegated: Heider SV SC Sperber Hamburg BFC Südring Berlin Alemannia 90 Berlin VfL Nord Berlin Reinickendorfer Füchse Eintracht Duisburg Eintracht Gelsenkirchen VfR Frankenthal FC Landsweiler VfL Neckarau Schwaben Augsburg Rot-Weiß Frankfurt

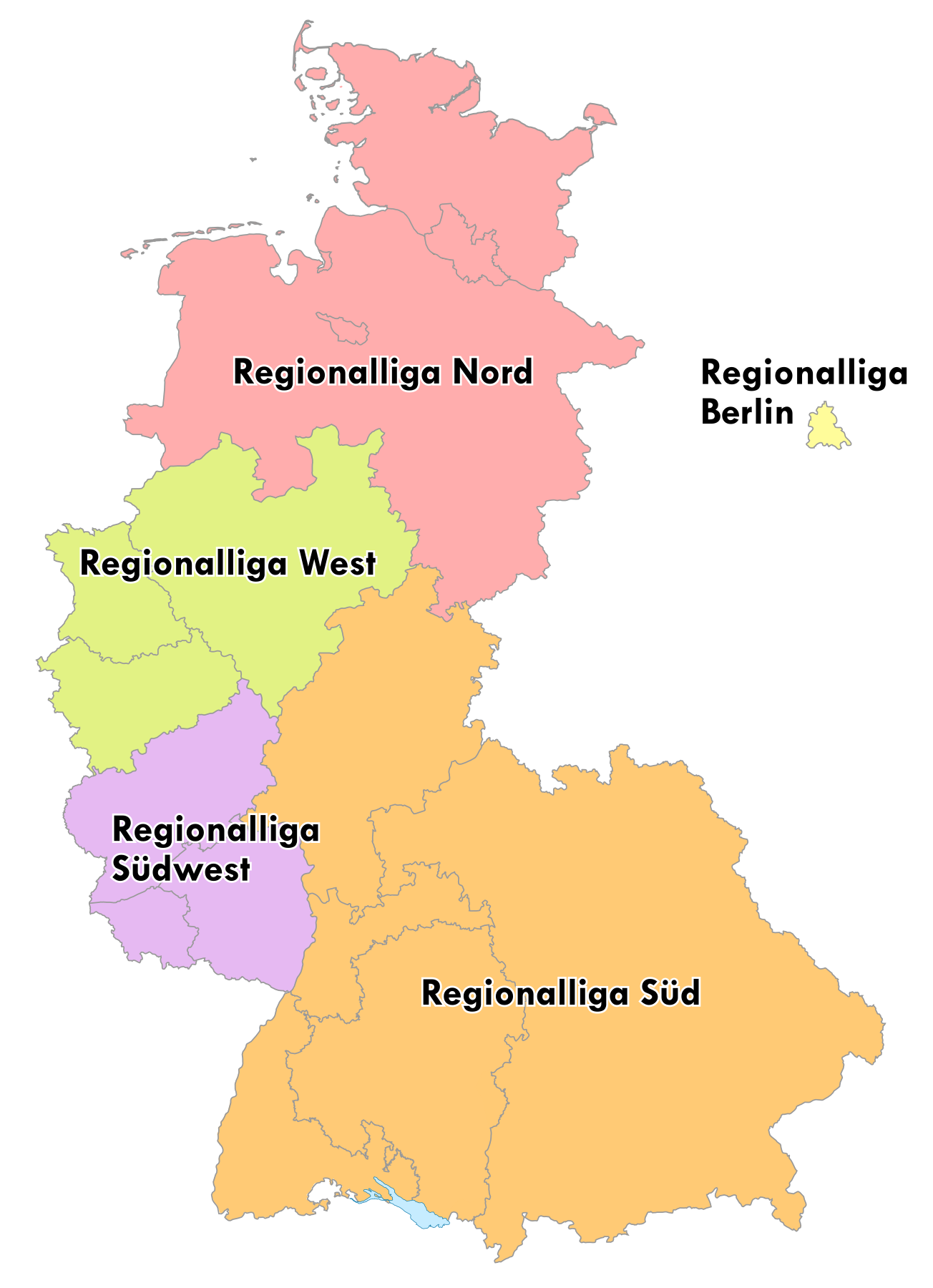
Map of the five German Regionalligas from 1963 to 1974

The 1968–69 Regionalliga was the sixth season of the Regionalliga, the second tier of the German football league system. The league operated in five regional divisions, Berlin, North, South, Southwest and West. The five league champions and all five runners-up, at the end of the season, entered a promotion play-off to determine the two clubs to move up to the Bundesliga for the next season. The two promotion spots went to the Regionalliga West champions and runners-up Rot-Weiß Oberhausen and Rot-Weiß Essen.

== Regionalliga Nord ==
The 1968–69 season saw two new clubs in the league, Heider SV and TuS Celle, both promoted from the Amateurliga, while no club had been relegated from the Bundesliga to the league.

Pos	Team	Pld	W	D	L	GF	GA	GD	Pts	Promotion, qualification or relegation
1	VfL Osnabrück	32	24	5	3	94	27	+67	53	Qualification to promotion playoffs
2	VfB Lübeck	32	19	6	7	61	39	+22	44	Qualification to promotion playoffs
3	FC St. Pauli	32	19	5	8	64	37	+27	43	
4	Göttingen 05	32	16	10	6	66	51	+15	42	
5	Arminia Hannover	32	15	8	9	51	35	+16	38	
6	Phönix Lübeck	32	15	8	9	55	41	+14	38	
7	VfL Wolfsburg	32	15	8	9	59	44	+15	38	
8	Holstein Kiel	32	12	8	12	47	51	−4	32	
9	TuS Bremerhaven 93	32	10	10	12	53	57	−4	30	
10	HSV Barmbek-Uhlenhorst	32	11	5	16	48	57	−9	27	
11	ASV Bergedorf 85	32	11	4	17	56	67	−11	26	
12	Concordia Hamburg	32	7	12	13	41	64	−23	26	
13	VfB Oldenburg	32	9	7	16	47	59	−12	25	
14	Itzehoer SV	32	9	5	18	47	72	−25	23	
15	TuS Celle	32	6	8	18	48	71	−23	20	
16	Heider SV (R)	32	7	6	19	46	79	−33	20	Relegation to Amateurliga
17	SC Sperber Hamburg (R)	32	6	7	19	39	71	−32	19	Relegation to Amateurliga

Source: Fussballdaten.de (in German)
Rules for classification: 1) Points;
(R) Relegated

== Regionalliga Berlin ==
The 1968–69 season saw three new clubs in the league, Meteor 06 Berlin, VfL Nord Berlin and SC Staaken, all three promoted from the Amateurliga, while no club had been relegated from the Bundesliga to the league. For the following season the league was reduced from 16 to 14 clubs.

Pos	Team	Pld	W	D	L	GF	GA	GD	Pts	Promotion, qualification or relegation
1	Hertha Zehlendorf	30	23	5	2	84	32	+52	51	Qualification to promotion playoffs
2	Tasmania 1900 Berlin	30	21	8	1	75	26	+49	50	Qualification to promotion playoffs
3	Tennis Borussia Berlin	30	20	5	5	96	38	+58	45	
4	Wacker 04 Berlin	30	19	5	6	93	31	+62	43	
5	Spandauer SV	30	19	4	7	73	42	+31	42	
6	1. FC Neukölln	30	14	7	9	72	60	+12	35	
7	Rapide Wedding	30	10	8	12	52	49	+3	28	
8	Kickers 1900 Berlin	30	10	8	12	55	54	+1	28	
9	Berliner SV 92	30	9	9	12	58	63	−5	27	
10	Blau-Weiß 90 Berlin	30	8	8	14	41	53	−12	24	
11	SC Staaken	30	9	6	15	44	61	−17	24	
12	Meteor 06 Berlin	30	8	5	17	53	88	−35	21	
13	BFC Südring Berlin (R)	30	8	4	18	38	62	−24	20	Relegation to Amateurliga
14	Alemannia 90 Berlin (R)	30	5	6	19	33	75	−42	16	Relegation to Amateurliga
15	VfL Nord Berlin (R)	30	5	5	20	50	107	−57	15	Relegation to Amateurliga
16	Reinickendorfer Füchse (R)	30	2	7	21	26	102	−76	11	Relegation to Amateurliga

Source: Fussballdaten.de (in German)
Rules for classification: 1) Points;
(R) Relegated

== Regionalliga West ==
The 1968–69 season saw two new clubs in the league, Bonner SC and Eintracht Duisburg, both promoted from the Amateurliga, while no club had been relegated from the Bundesliga to the league.

Pos	Team	Pld	W	D	L	GF	GA	GD	Pts	Promotion, qualification or relegation
1	Rot-Weiß Oberhausen (P)	34	22	9	3	69	24	+45	53	Qualification to promotion playoffs
2	Rot-Weiß Essen (P)	34	21	9	4	72	25	+47	51	Qualification to promotion playoffs
3	VfL Bochum	34	23	5	6	86	36	+50	51	
4	Fortuna Düsseldorf	34	18	9	7	64	35	+29	45	
5	Wuppertaler SV	34	16	8	10	46	41	+5	40	
6	Schwarz-Weiß Essen	34	16	8	10	48	43	+5	40	
7	Arminia Bielefeld	34	14	10	10	63	47	+16	38	
8	Bayer Leverkusen	34	12	12	10	48	35	+13	36	
9	VfR Neuß	34	8	14	12	38	52	−14	30	
10	Lüner SV	34	8	12	14	39	47	−8	28	
11	Sportfreunde Hamborn	34	10	8	16	46	64	−18	28	
12	TSV Marl-Hüls	34	10	7	17	33	58	−25	27	
13	Fortuna Köln	34	7	12	15	44	69	−25	26	
14	Preußen Münster	34	8	10	16	40	63	−23	26	
15	Bonner SC	34	10	5	19	45	70	−25	25	
16	Viktoria Köln	34	5	13	16	33	53	−20	23	
17	Eintracht Duisburg	34	7	9	18	30	64	−34	23	Relegation to Amateurliga
18	Eintracht Gelsenkirchen (R)	34	8	6	20	47	65	−18	22	Relegation to Amateurliga

Source: Fussballdaten.de (in German)
Rules for classification: 1) Points;
(P) Promoted; (R) Relegated

== Regionalliga Südwest ==
The 1968–69 season saw three new clubs in the league, FV Speyer and FC Landsweiler, both promoted from the Amateurliga, while Borussia Neunkirchen had been relegated from the Bundesliga to the league.

Pos	Team	Pld	W	D	L	GF	GA	GD	Pts	Promotion, qualification or relegation
1	SV Alsenborn	30	18	8	4	69	25	+44	44	Qualification to promotion playoffs
2	TuS Neuendorf	30	17	10	3	56	23	+33	44	Qualification to promotion playoffs
3	1. FC Saarbrücken	30	17	7	6	71	28	+43	41	
4	FK Pirmasens	30	16	8	6	65	36	+29	40	
5	Borussia Neunkirchen	30	16	5	9	54	34	+20	37	
6	Saar 05 Saarbrücken	30	13	8	9	51	36	+15	34	
7	Südwest Ludwigshafen	30	13	7	10	42	36	+6	33	
8	Wormatia Worms	30	12	6	12	49	53	−4	30	
9	FC Homburg	30	11	7	12	40	49	−9	29	
10	Eintracht Trier	30	11	6	13	47	45	+2	28	
11	FV Speyer	30	9	6	15	40	59	−19	24	
12	Röchling Völklingen	30	8	8	14	41	64	−23	24	
13	FSV Mainz 05	30	9	5	16	40	58	−18	23	
14	SV Weisenau Mainz	30	7	7	16	33	55	−22	21	
15	VfR Frankenthal (R)	30	6	8	16	33	64	−31	20	Relegation to Amateurliga
16	FC Landsweiler (R)	30	3	2	25	33	99	−66	8	Relegation to Amateurliga

Source: Fussballdaten.de (in German)
Rules for classification: 1) Points;
(R) Relegated

== Regionalliga Süd ==
The 1968–69 season saw four new clubs in the league, VfL Neckarau, ESV Ingolstadt and Rot-Weiß Frankfurt, both promoted from the Amateurliga, while Karlsruher SC had been relegated from the Bundesliga to the league.

Pos	Team	Pld	W	D	L	GF	GA	GD	Pts	Promotion, qualification or relegation
1	Karlsruher SC	34	18	7	9	73	43	+30	43	Qualification to promotion playoffs
2	Freiburger FC	34	18	7	9	67	42	+25	43	Qualification to promotion playoffs
3	FC Bayern Hof	34	17	8	9	53	30	+23	42	
4	Stuttgarter Kickers	34	15	12	7	66	43	+23	42	
5	Jahn Regensburg	34	14	9	11	54	38	+16	37	
6	FC Schweinfurt 05	34	12	12	10	67	53	+14	36	
7	SpVgg Fürth	34	13	10	11	37	36	+1	36	
8	SV Darmstadt 98	34	13	9	12	50	45	+5	35	
9	SSV Reutlingen	34	12	11	11	49	58	−9	35	
10	KSV Hessen Kassel	34	14	5	15	60	52	+8	33	
11	SV Waldhof Mannheim	34	11	11	12	44	52	−8	33	
12	ESV Ingolstadt	34	12	9	13	50	60	−10	33	
13	FC 08 Villingen	34	12	8	14	45	54	−9	32	
14	VfR Mannheim	34	12	7	15	51	54	−3	31	
15	Opel Rüsselsheim	34	12	7	15	41	55	−14	31	
16	VfL Neckarau (R)	34	7	12	15	34	65	−31	26	Relegation to Amateurliga
17	Schwaben Augsburg (R)	34	9	7	18	44	55	−11	25	Relegation to Amateurliga
18	Rot-Weiß Frankfurt (R)	34	7	5	22	36	86	−50	19	Relegation to Amateurliga

Source: Fussballdaten.de (in German)
Rules for classification: 1) Points;
(R) Relegated

== Bundesliga promotion round ==
=== Group 1 ===
Pos	Team	Pld	W	D	L	GF	GA	GD	Pts	Promotion, qualification or relegation
1	Rot-Weiß Oberhausen (P)	8	5	1	2	17	9	+8	11	Promotion to Bundesliga
2	Freiburger FC	8	5	1	2	16	10	+6	11	
3	SV Alsenborn	8	5	0	3	20	15	+5	10	
4	Hertha Zehlendorf	8	3	1	4	15	16	−1	7	
5	VfB Lübeck	8	0	1	7	10	28	−18	1	

Source: Fussballdaten.de (in German)
Rules for classification: 1) Points;
(P) Promoted

=== Group 2 ===
Pos	Team	Pld	W	D	L	GF	GA	GD	Pts	Promotion, qualification or relegation
1	Rot-Weiß Essen (P)	8	6	2	0	28	9	+19	14	Promotion to Bundesliga
2	VfL Osnabrück	8	4	3	1	13	8	+5	11	
3	Karlsruher SC	8	3	2	3	14	15	−1	8	
4	Tasmania 1900 Berlin	8	2	0	6	5	17	−12	4	
5	TuS Neuendorf	8	1	1	6	8	19	−11	3	

Source: Fussballdaten.de (in German)
Rules for classification: 1) Points;
(P) Promoted
