= 1969–70 Regionalliga =

Regionalliga
- Season: 1969–70
- Champions: VfL Osnabrück Hertha Zehlendorf VfL Bochum SV Alsenborn Kickers Offenbach
- Promoted: Arminia Bielefeld Kickers Offenbach
- Relegated: ASV Bergedorf 85 Concordia Hamburg Berliner SV 92 Kickers 1900 Berlin Meteor 06 Berlin Sportfreunde Neukölln SSVg Velbert TSV Marl-Hüls SV Weisenau Mainz SC Friedrichsthal SpVgg Bayreuth SV Darmstadt 98 FSV Frankfurt SV Waldhof Mannheim

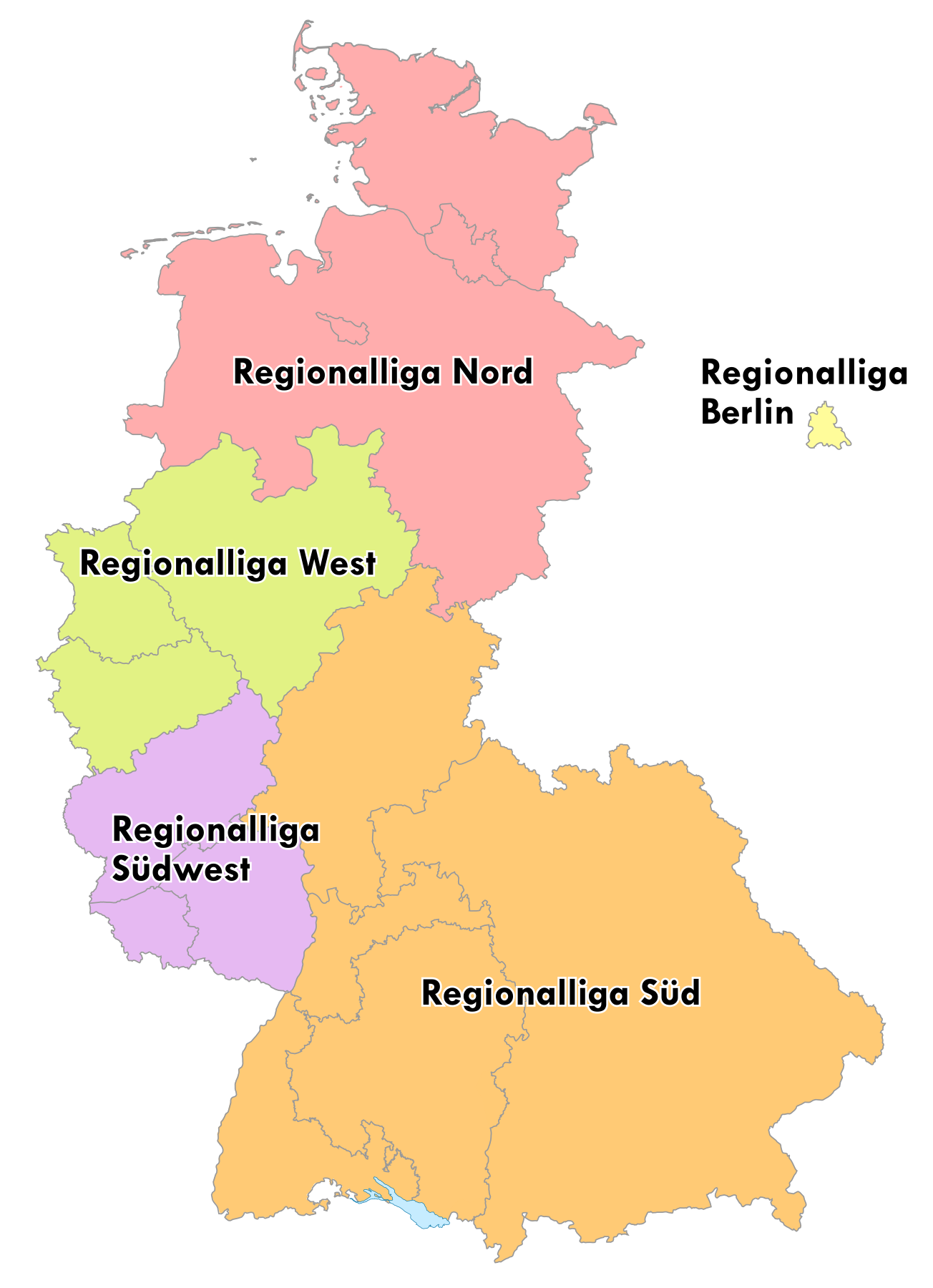
Map of the five German Regionalligas from 1963 to 1974

The 1969–70 Regionalliga was the seventh season of the Regionalliga, the second tier of the German football league system. The league operated in five regional divisions, Berlin, North, South, Southwest and West. The five league champions and all five runners-up, at the end of the season, entered a promotion play-off to determine the two clubs to move up to the Bundesliga for the next season. The two promotion spots went to the Regionalliga Süd champions Kickers Offenbach and Regionalliga West runners-up Arminia Bielefeld.

== Regionalliga Nord ==
The 1969–70 season saw two new clubs in the league, Olympia Wilhelmshaven and SC Leu Braunschweig, both promoted from the Amateurliga, while no club had been relegated from the Bundesliga to the league.

Pos	Team	Pld	W	D	L	GF	GA	GD	Pts	Promotion, qualification or relegation
1	VfL Osnabrück	32	21	5	6	75	38	+37	47	Qualification to promotion playoffs
2	VfL Wolfsburg	32	19	8	5	78	35	+43	46	Qualification to promotion playoffs
3	Holstein Kiel	32	17	10	5	64	37	+27	44	
4	FC St. Pauli	32	18	6	8	56	33	+23	42	
5	Göttingen 05	32	18	5	9	65	42	+23	41	
6	TuS Bremerhaven 93	32	16	5	11	57	47	+10	37	
7	VfB Lübeck	32	14	8	10	46	41	+5	36	
8	Arminia Hannover	32	13	7	12	53	51	+2	33	
9	VfB Oldenburg	32	12	9	11	44	48	−4	33	
10	HSV Barmbek-Uhlenhorst	32	10	10	12	42	45	−3	30	
11	TuS Celle	32	10	6	16	39	61	−22	26	
12	Itzehoer SV	32	10	4	18	57	71	−14	24	
13	Phönix Lübeck	32	8	8	16	41	61	−20	24	
14	SC Leu Braunschweig	32	9	5	18	42	57	−15	23	
15	Olympia Wilhelmshaven	32	5	12	15	28	49	−21	22	
16	ASV Bergedorf 85 (R)	32	9	4	19	46	79	−33	22	Relegation to Amateurliga
17	Concordia Hamburg (R)	32	4	6	22	22	60	−38	14	Relegation to Amateurliga

Source: Fussballdaten.de (in German)
Rules for classification: 1) Points;
(R) Relegated

== Regionalliga Berlin ==
The 1969–70 season saw two new clubs in the league, TuS Wannsee and Sportfreunde Neukölln, both promoted from the Amateurliga, while no club had been relegated from the Bundesliga to the league. For the following season the Regionalliga Berlin was reduced from 14 to 12 clubs.

Pos	Team	Pld	W	D	L	GF	GA	GD	Pts	Promotion, qualification or relegation
1	Hertha Zehlendorf	26	22	3	1	101	23	+78	47	Qualification to promotion playoffs
2	Tennis Borussia Berlin	26	18	3	5	70	23	+47	39	Qualification to promotion playoffs
3	Tasmania 1900 Berlin	26	16	7	3	64	23	+41	39	
4	Blau-Weiß 90 Berlin	26	13	8	5	63	33	+30	34	
5	Wacker 04 Berlin	26	13	8	5	58	36	+22	34	
6	Spandauer SV	26	10	9	7	47	44	+3	29	
7	Rapide Wedding	26	9	8	9	46	51	−5	26	
8	1. FC Neukölln	26	8	6	12	31	47	−16	22	
9	TuS Wannsee	26	7	7	12	32	36	−4	21	
10	SC Staaken	26	7	6	13	32	51	−19	20	
11	Berliner SV 92 (R)	26	4	11	11	34	50	−16	19	Relegation to Amateurliga
12	Kickers 1900 Berlin (R)	26	4	6	16	31	65	−34	14	Relegation to Amateurliga
13	Meteor 06 Berlin (R)	26	3	6	17	29	66	−37	12	Relegation to Amateurliga
14	Sportfreunde Neukölln (R)	26	2	4	20	15	105	−90	8	Relegation to Amateurliga

Source: Fussballdaten.de (in German)
Rules for classification: 1) Points;
(R) Relegated

== Regionalliga West ==
The 1969–70 season saw three new clubs in the league, DJK Gütersloh, SSVg Velbert and SpVgg Erkenschwick, all promoted from the Amateurliga, while no club had been relegated from the Bundesliga to the league.

Pos	Team	Pld	W	D	L	GF	GA	GD	Pts	Promotion, qualification or relegation
1	VfL Bochum	34	21	8	5	63	32	+31	50	Qualification to promotion playoffs
2	Arminia Bielefeld (P)	34	20	8	6	61	30	+31	48	Qualification to promotion playoffs
3	Wuppertaler SV	34	19	8	7	71	39	+32	46	
4	Fortuna Düsseldorf	34	18	8	8	65	33	+32	44	
5	Schwarz-Weiß Essen	34	18	6	10	60	41	+19	42	
6	Lüner SV	34	12	14	8	52	37	+15	38	
7	Preußen Münster	34	15	7	12	69	58	+11	37	
8	Wattenscheid 09	34	10	14	10	49	53	−4	34	
9	VfR Neuß	34	13	6	15	50	53	−3	32	
10	DJK Gütersloh	34	10	11	13	42	48	−6	31	
11	Bayer Leverkusen	34	10	11	13	48	65	−17	31	
12	Viktoria Köln	34	11	8	15	53	57	−4	30	
13	Bonner SC	34	11	8	15	39	47	−8	30	
14	Fortuna Köln	34	9	12	13	50	59	−9	30	
15	SpVgg Erkenschwick	34	10	7	17	38	53	−15	27	
16	Sportfreunde Hamborn	34	7	10	17	52	69	−17	24	
17	SSVg Velbert (R)	34	6	10	18	37	73	−36	22	Relegation to Amateurliga
18	TSV Marl-Hüls (R)	34	4	8	22	29	81	−52	16	Relegation to Amateurliga

Source: Fussballdaten.de (in German)
Rules for classification: 1) Points;
(P) Promoted; (R) Relegated

== Regionalliga Südwest ==
The 1969–70 season saw two new clubs in the league, ASV Landau and SC Friedrichsthal, both promoted from the Amateurliga, while no club had been relegated from the Bundesliga to the league.

Pos	Team	Pld	W	D	L	GF	GA	GD	Pts	Promotion, qualification or relegation
1	SV Alsenborn	30	20	7	3	69	23	+46	47	Qualification to promotion playoffs
2	FK Pirmasens	30	19	6	5	68	36	+32	44	Qualification to promotion playoffs
3	Südwest Ludwigshafen	30	16	7	7	45	30	+15	39	
4	Borussia Neunkirchen	30	15	7	8	63	40	+23	37	
5	FV Speyer	30	13	7	10	42	41	+1	33	
6	1. FC Saarbrücken	30	12	8	10	47	31	+16	32	
7	ASV Landau	30	13	6	11	44	31	+13	32	
8	TuS Neuendorf	30	14	3	13	45	51	−6	31	
9	Saar 05 Saarbrücken	30	11	6	13	42	47	−5	28	
10	Eintracht Trier	30	12	4	14	36	48	−12	28	
11	Wormatia Worms	30	10	5	15	50	57	−7	25	
12	FSV Mainz 05	30	10	5	15	37	58	−21	25	
13	Röchling Völklingen	30	8	7	15	34	41	−7	23	
14	FC Homburg	30	8	4	18	41	54	−13	20	
15	SV Weisenau Mainz (R)	30	7	6	17	38	76	−38	20	Relegation to Amateurliga
16	SC Friedrichsthal (R)	30	4	8	18	41	78	−37	16	Relegation to Amateurliga

Source: Fussballdaten.de (in German)
Rules for classification: 1) Points;
(R) Relegated

== Regionalliga Süd ==
The 1969–70 season saw four new clubs in the league, FSV Frankfurt and VfR Heilbronn, both promoted from the Amateurliga, while Kickers Offenbach and 1. FC Nürnberg had been relegated from the Bundesliga to the league.

Pos	Team	Pld	W	D	L	GF	GA	GD	Pts	Promotion, qualification or relegation
1	Kickers Offenbach (P)	38	27	5	6	93	47	+46	59	Qualification to promotion playoffs and European Cup Winners' Cup first round (Note: Kickers Offenbach qualified for the European Cup Winners' Cup first round by winning the 1969–70 DFB-Pokal.)
2	Karlsruher SC	38	23	12	3	87	37	+50	58	Qualification to promotion playoffs
3	1. FC Nürnberg	38	24	9	5	64	29	+35	57	
4	Bayern Hof	38	19	9	10	65	40	+25	47	
5	FC Schweinfurt 05	38	18	6	14	78	59	+19	42	
6	Freiburger FC	38	14	12	12	63	48	+15	40	
7	Hessen Kassel	38	15	10	13	54	50	+4	40	
8	SpVgg Fürth	38	14	10	14	49	50	−1	38	
9	FC 08 Villingen	38	14	9	15	61	58	+3	37	
10	Jahn Regensburg	38	12	11	15	61	59	+2	35	
11	SSV Reutlingen	38	12	11	15	51	56	−5	35	
12	Stuttgarter Kickers	38	13	7	18	61	57	+4	33	
13	Opel Rüsselsheim	38	12	9	17	50	50	0	33	
14	VfR Heilbronn	38	11	11	16	50	57	−7	33	
15	VfR Mannheim	38	12	9	17	48	61	−13	33	
16	ESV Ingolstadt	38	10	10	18	55	77	−22	30	
17	SpVgg Bayreuth (R)	38	9	12	17	58	80	−22	30	Relegation to Amateurliga
18	SV Darmstadt 98 (R)	38	12	6	20	50	89	−39	30	Relegation to Amateurliga
19	FSV Frankfurt (R)	38	9	7	22	34	79	−45	25	Relegation to Amateurliga
20	SV Waldhof Mannheim (R)	38	8	9	21	50	99	−49	25	Relegation to Amateurliga

Source: Fussballdaten.de (in German)
Rules for classification: 1) Points;
(P) Promoted; (R) Relegated

== Bundesliga promotion round ==
=== Group 1 ===
Pos	Team	Pld	W	D	L	GF	GA	GD	Pts	Promotion, qualification or relegation
1	Arminia Bielefeld (P)	8	5	2	1	13	3	+10	12	Promotion to Bundesliga
2	Karlsruher SC	8	5	1	2	16	8	+8	11	
3	SV Alsenborn	8	4	0	4	12	12	0	8	
4	Tennis Borussia Berlin	8	1	3	4	7	13	−6	5	
5	VfL Osnabrück	8	1	2	5	6	18	−12	4	

Source: Fussballdaten.de (in German)
Rules for classification: 1) Points;
(P) Promoted

=== Group 2 ===
Pos	Team	Pld	W	D	L	GF	GA	GD	Pts	Promotion, qualification or relegation
1	Kickers Offenbach (P)	8	5	2	1	17	8	+9	12	Promotion to Bundesliga
2	VfL Bochum	8	4	1	3	14	7	+7	9	
3	Hertha Zehlendorf	8	4	0	4	17	14	+3	8	
4	VfL Wolfsburg	8	2	2	4	13	21	−8	6	
5	FK Pirmasens	8	1	3	4	12	23	−11	5	

Source: Fussballdaten.de (in German)
Rules for classification: 1) Points;
(P) Promoted
