= Regionalliga West (1963–1974) =

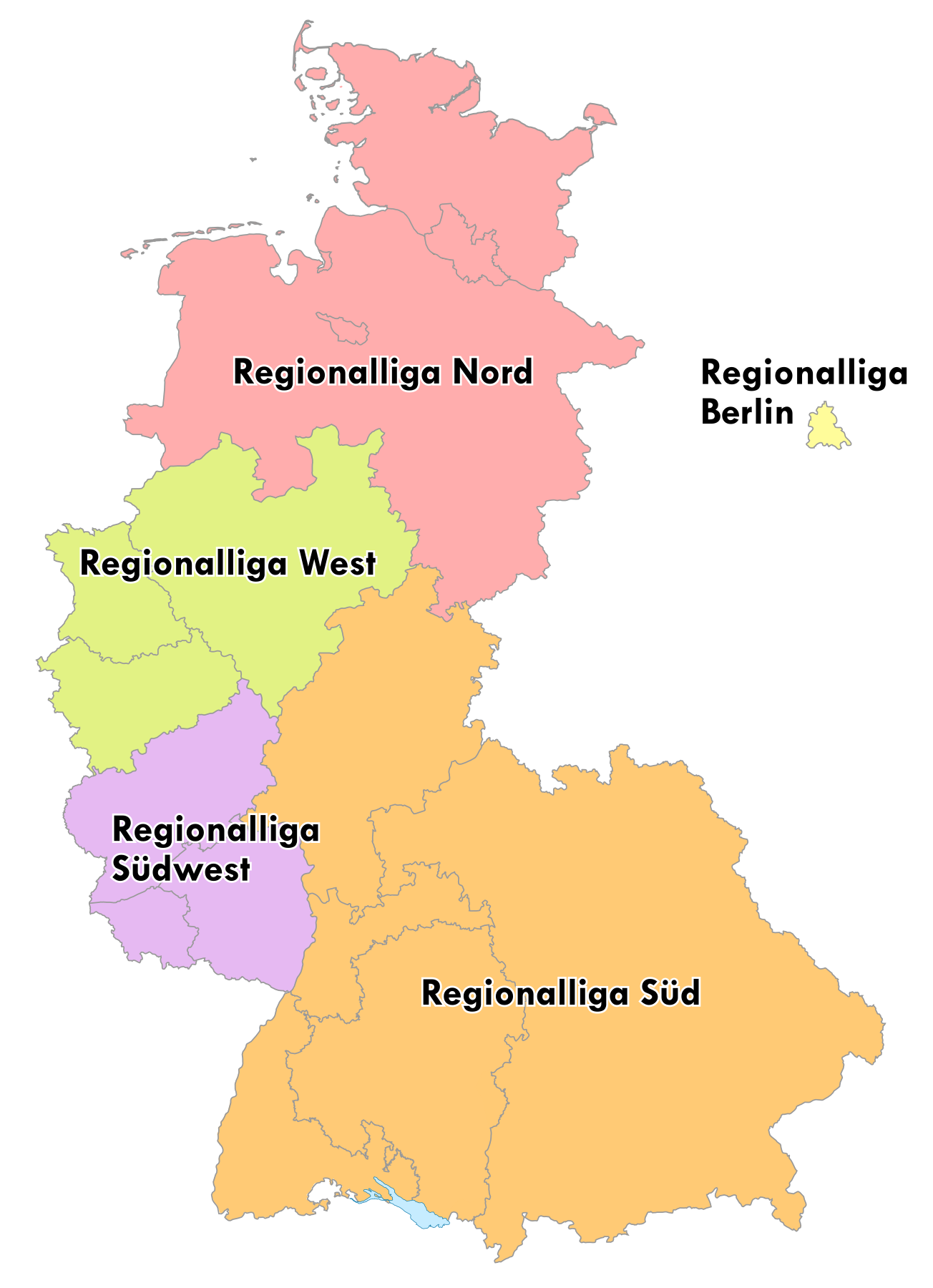
- Founded: 1963
- Folded: 1974 (11 seasons)
- Replaced by: 2. Bundesliga Nord
- Country: Germany
- State: Nordrhein-Westfalen
- Level on pyramid: Level 2
- Promotion to: Bundesliga
- Relegation to: Verbandsliga Mittelrhein; Verbandsliga Niederrhein; Verbandsliga Westfalen 1; Verbandsliga Westfalen 2
- Last champions: SG Wattenscheid 09 (1973–74)

The Regionalliga West was the second-highest level of the German football league system in the west of Germany from 1963 until the formation of the 2. Bundesliga in 1974. It covered the state of Nordrhein-Westfalen, the most populous state of Germany.

== Overview ==
The league started out in 1963 with 20 teams in the league, which was reduced to 18 the year after.

It was formed from the eleven clubs of the Oberliga West which were not admitted to the new Bundesliga, from the top eight clubs of the 2. Oberliga West and one club from the Verbandsliga Westfalen, the Lüner SV. The Regionalliga West was as such a continuation of the Oberliga West under a different name and a tier lower.

Along with the Regionalliga West went another four Regionalligas, these five formed the second tier of German football until 1974:

- Regionalliga Nord, covering the states of Niedersachsen, Schleswig-Holstein, Bremen and Hamburg
- Regionalliga Süd, covering the state of Bayern, Hessen and Baden-Württemberg
- Regionalliga Berlin, covering West-Berlin
- Regionalliga Südwest, covering the states of Rheinland-Pfalz and Saarland

The new Regionalligas were formed along the borders of the old post-World War II Oberligas, not after a balanced regional system. Therefore, the Oberligas Berlin and West covered small but populous areas while Nord and Süd covered large areas. Südwest was something of an anomaly, neither large nor populous.

The winners and runners-up of this league were admitted to the promotion play-off to the Bundesliga, which was staged in two groups of originally four, later five teams each with the winner of each group going up.

The bottom teams in varying number were relegated to the Verbandsligas. Below the Regionalliga West were the following Verbandsligas:

- Verbandsliga Niederrhein
- Verbandsliga Mittelrhein
- Verbandsliga Westfalen 1
- Verbandsliga Westfalen 2

Schwarz-Weiß Essen is the only club to have played in all eleven seasons of the Regionalliga West.

== Disbanding of the Regionalliga West ==
The league was dissolved in 1974. According to their performance of the last couple of seasons, 11 clubs of the Regionalliga went to the new 2. Bundesliga Nord. The seven remaining clubs were relegated to the Amateurligas.

The teams admitted to the 2. Bundesliga Nord were:

- SG Wattenscheid 09
- Rot-Weiss Oberhausen
- Bayer Uerdingen
- 1. FC Mülheim
- Preußen Münster
- Borussia Dortmund
- Alemannia Aachen
- Schwarz-Weiss Essen
- DJK Gütersloh
- SpVgg Erkenschwick
- Arminia Bielefeld

The following teams were relegated to the Amateurligas:

- to Amateurliga Westfalen Nordost: Arminia Gütersloh, Eintracht Gelsenkirchen
- to Amateurliga Westfalen Südwest: Rot-Weiß Lüdenscheid, Sportfreunde Siegen, Westfalia Herne
- to Amateurliga Mittelrhein: Viktoria Köln
- to Amateurliga Niederrhein: Union Solingen

== Re-formation of the Regionalliga West ==
In 1994, the Regionalligas were re-established, after 20 years, this time as the third tier of German Football. The new Regionalliga West/Südwest was a merger of the two old Regionalligas Südwest and West. In 2000, this league was disbanded again and its clubs spread over the Regionalligas Süd and Nord.

In 2008, the Regionalliga West reformed again, covering the same territory as the Regionalliga West/Südwest did but now called West only. It is the fourth tier of football in Germany.

== Champions and runners-up of the Regionalliga West ==
The winners and runners-up of the league were:

| **Season** | **Champion** | **Runner-Up** |
| 1963–64 | Alemannia Aachen | Wuppertaler SV |
| 1964–65 | **Borussia Mönchengladbach** | Alemannia Aachen |
| 1965–66 | **Fortuna Düsseldorf** | **Rot-Weiss Essen** |
| 1966–67 | **Alemannia Aachen** | Schwarz-Weiss Essen |
| 1967–68 | Bayer Leverkusen | Rot-Weiss Essen |
| 1968–69 | **Rot-Weiss Oberhausen** | **Rot-Weiss Essen** |
| 1969–70 | VfL Bochum | **Arminia Bielefeld** |
| 1970–71 | **VfL Bochum** | **Fortuna Düsseldorf** |
| 1971–72 | **Wuppertaler SV** | Rot-Weiss Essen |
| 1972–73 | **Rot-Weiss Essen** | **Fortuna Köln** |
| 1973–74 | SG Wattenscheid 09 | Rot-Weiss Oberhausen |

- **Bold** denotes team went on to gain promotion to the Bundesliga.
- Alemannia Aachen (1964, 1967, 1999), SG Wattenscheid 09 (1974, 1997), Rot–Weiss Oberhausen (1969, 1998) and Rot–Weiss Essen (1973, 2004, 2006) all have won the old and the new Regionalliga.

== Placings in the Regionalliga West 1963 to 1974 ==
The league placings from 1963 to 1974:

| Club | 64 | 65 | 66 | 67 | 68 | 69 | 70 | 71 | 72 | 73 | 74 |
|---|---|---|---|---|---|---|---|---|---|---|---|
| Borussia Mönchengladbach | 8 | **1** | **B** | **B** | **B** | **B** | **B** | **B** | **B** | **B** | **B** |
| VfL Bochum | | | 12 | 4 | 5 | 3 | **1** | **1** | **B** | **B** | **B** |
| Fortuna Düsseldorf | 3 | 3 | **1** | **B** | 6 | 4 | 4 | 2 | **B** | **B** | **B** |
| Wuppertaler SV | 2 | 6 | 5 | 7 | 15 | 5 | 3 | 3 | **1** | **B** | **B** |
| Rot-Weiß Essen | 10 | 7 | 2 | **B** | 2 | 2 | **B** | **B** | 2 | **1** | **B** |
| Fortuna Köln | | | | | 16 | 13 | 14 | 4 | 3 | 2 | **B** |
| SG Wattenscheid 09 | | | | | | | 8 | 13 | 12 | 5 | **1** |
| Rot-Weiß Oberhausen | 7 | 4 | 4 | 6 | 3 | **1** | **B** | **B** | **B** | **B** | 2 |
| Bayer Uerdingen | | | | | | | | | 7 | 3 | 3 |
| 1. FC Mülheim | | | | | | | | | | 8 | 4 |
| Preußen Münster | **B** | 8 | 6 | 9 | 13 | 14 | 7 | 9 | 11 | 13 | 5 |
| Borussia Dortmund | **B** | **B** | **B** | **B** | **B** | **B** | **B** | **B** | **B** | 4 | 6 |
| Alemannia Aachen | **1** | 2 | 3 | **1** | **B** | **B** | **B** | 6 | 4 | 6 | 7 |
| Schwarz-Weiß Essen | 13 | 9 | 7 | 2 | 7 | 6 | 5 | 11 | 5 | 12 | 8 |
| DJK Gütersloh | | | | | | | 10 | 8 | 13 | 9 | 9 |
| Rot-Weiß Lüdenscheid | | | | | | | | | | | 10 |
| SpVgg Erkenschwick | | | | | | | 15 | 15 | 6 | 10 | 11 |
| Sportfreunde Siegen | 18 | | | | | | | | | 7 | 12 |
| Arminia Gütersloh | | | | | | | | | 9 | 16 | 13 |
| Arminia Bielefeld | 11 | 5 | 10 | 3 | 4 | 7 | 2 | **B** | **B** | 11 | 14 |
| Union Solingen | | | | | | | | | | | 15 |
| STV Horst-Emscher | 15 | 17 | 18 | | | | | | | | 16 |
| Westfalia Herne | 6 | 12 | 15 | 11 | 17 | | | 12 | 14 | 15 | 17 |
| Viktoria Köln | 5 | 10 | 9 | 13 | 10 | 16 | 12 | 10 | 17 | | 18 |
| Eintracht Gelsenkirchen | | 13 | 16 | 12 | 14 | 18 | | 5 | 10 | 14 | |
| Bayer Leverkusen | 12 | 16 | 14 | 10 | **1** | 8 | 11 | 7 | 8 | 17 | |
| Lüner SV | 20 | | | | 8 | 10 | 6 | 14 | 15 | 18 | |
| VfR Neuß | | | | 8 | 12 | 9 | 9 | 16 | 16 | | |
| VfL Klafeld | | | | | | | | | 18 | | |
| Bonner SC | | | | 17 | | 15 | 13 | 17 | | | |
| SF Hamborn 07 | 14 | 14 | 8 | 5 | 9 | 11 | 16 | 18 | | | |
| SSVg Velbert | | | | | | | 17 | | | | |
| TSV Marl-Hüls | 4 | 15 | 13 | 14 | 11 | 12 | 18 | | | | |
| Eintracht Duisburg | 9 | 11 | 11 | 18 | | 17 | | | | | |
| VfB Bottrop | 17 | | 17 | | 18 | | | | | | |
| SSV Hagen | | | | 15 | | | | | | | |
| Hammer SpVg | | | | 16 | | | | | | | |
| Homberger SV | | 18 | | | | | | | | | |
| SpVgg Herten | 16 | | | | | | | | | | |
| Duisburg 48/99 | 19 | | | | | | | | | | |

Source:"Regionalliga West". Das deutsche Fussball-Archiv.

=== Key ===
| Symbol | Key |
|---|---|
| **B** | Bundesliga |
| Place | League |
| Blank | Played at a league level below this league |

=== Notes ===
- Duisburger SV and Duisburg 48/99 merged in 1964 to form Eintracht Duisburg.
- In 1973, Eintracht Gelsenkirchen merged with STV Horst-Emscher, calling itself STV Eintracht Gelsenkirchen until 1978, then STV Horst-Emscher again.
