= Hans-Jürgen Ferdinand =

German footballer (born 1943)

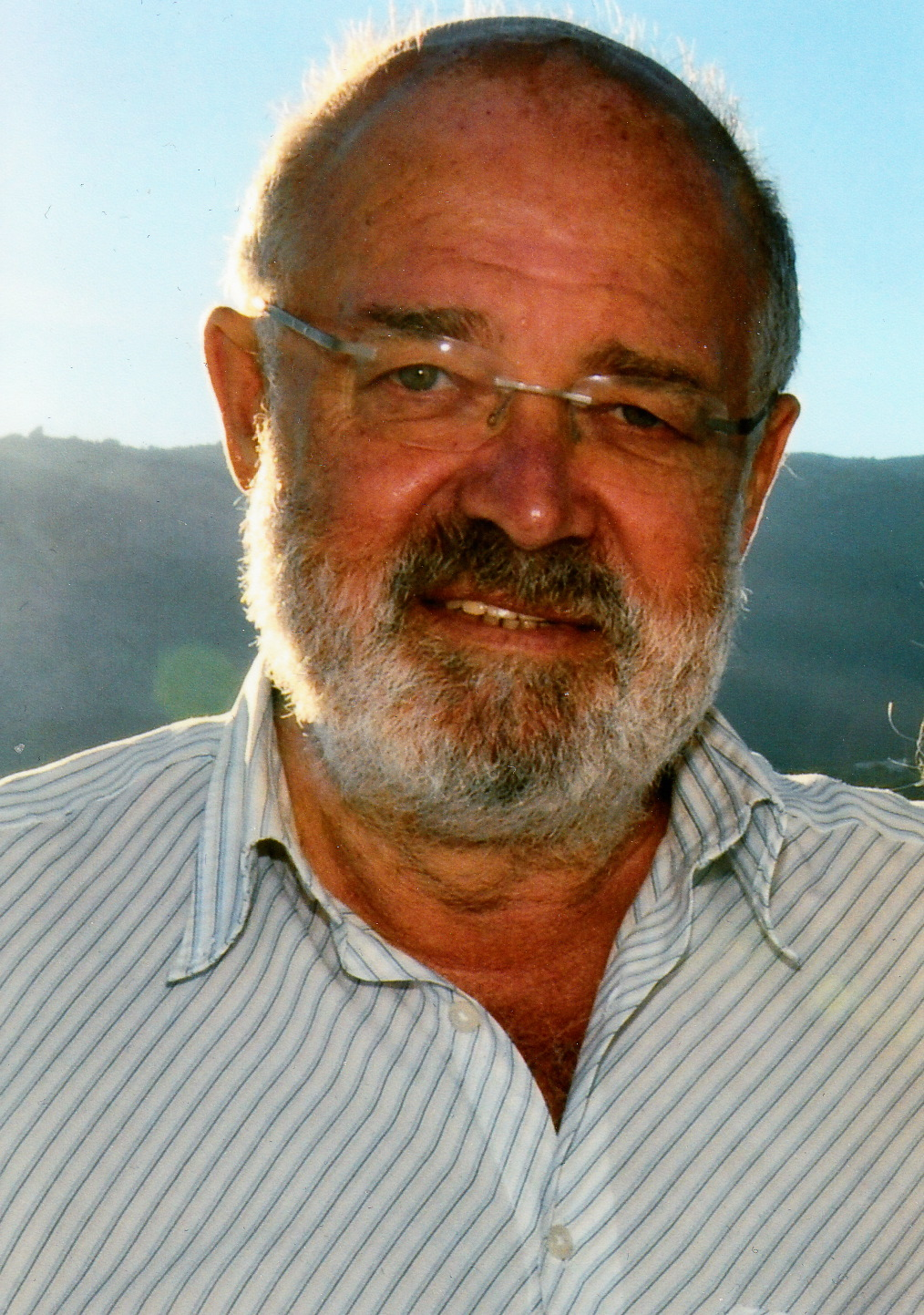
- Ferdinand in 2016

Personal information
- Date of birth: 21 August 1943 (age 83)
- Place of birth: Dernbach, Hesse-Nassau, Germany
- Position: Center forward

Youth career
- ???–1961: SV Hillscheid
- 1961–1963: Eintracht Höhr-Grenzhausen

Senior career*
Years	Team	Apps	(Gls)
1963–1964	SpVgg Bendorf	32	(38)
1964–1966	TuS Neuendorf	47	(45)
1966–1968	Alemannia Aachen	31	(19)
1968–1970	Chiasso	48	(36)
1970–1974	Alemannia Aachen	77	(41)
- * Club domestic league appearances and goals

Hans-Jürgen Ferdinand (born 21 August 1943) is a German retired football player and real estate agent. Nicknamed "Yogi", he played as a forward for various clubs throughout the 1960s and the 1970s, notably playing for Bundesliga club Alemannia Aachen and playing abroad in Switzerland for Chiasso.

== Football career ==
Ferdinand went through his footballing youth in the youth teams of Eintracht Höhr-Grenzhausen. He already made it into various youth selection teams before he was accepted directly from the A-youth into the primary team in August 1961. He played for Eintracht for two years and had a commercial apprenticeship at Rheinstahl-Thyssen in Bendorf and lived with his parents in the neighbouring town of Hillscheid, four kilometres away. As a teenager, he also played table tennis as a competitive sport.

The young attacker first attracted attention nationwide in the 1963–64 season with SpVgg Bendorf in the Amateurliga Rheinland. He was the top scorer in the Amateurliga Rheinland with 36 goals as Bendorf finished in third place. The young talent then received a contract with TuS Neuendorf in the Regionalliga Südwest for the 1964–65 Regionalliga. Financially, this was a clear improvement for him as he went from an apprentice allowance of 77 marks to a monthly basic salary of 320 marks with a financial incentive of 40 marks per victory and 20 marks per draw. In addition, he received a gift of 4,000 marks, with which he bought his first car being a used Volkswagen Beetle and was therefore no longer dependent on driving as before.

At TuS Neuendorf, Hermann Oster, a former Oberliga southwest player at TuS and later a tax official at the then Oberfinanzdirektion in Koblenz, was the coach. He became a fatherly friend to the young newcomer and knew how to motivate the former amateur footballer again and again as a centre-forward and goalscorer. With success: Ferdinand scored 21 goals in 24 league games in his first year in the Regionalliga Südwest and Neuendorf finished in 6th place. The Bundesliga club 1. FC Kaiserslautern therefore became interested in the attacker and Ferdinand completed a trial training on the Betzenberg through the mediation of Fritz Walter. A two-year contract had already been signed, but Koblenz refused to release him so he remained in the club for the 1965–66 Regionalliga. Elsewhere, the managerial position had gone from Oster to the former Max Merkel assistant Karl-Heinz Trieschmann and accompanied by an abrupt change in tone. Trieschmann would often shone Ferdinand and other players with crude phrasings which became an infamous trait about the manager. Despite his bad relationship with the coach, Ferdinand scored 20 goals in the 1965–66 season.

The strong and robust newcomer immediately confirmed his finishing qualities in the southwest German second division and scored 41 goals in 48 league appearances for the team from the Oberwerth stadium in two rounds. When he had contributed 20 goals to TuS Neuendorf's 4th place in 1965–66 alongside Werner Hölzenbein and Hans Sondermann, he was newly signed by West German Regionalliga club Alemannia Aachen for the 1966–67 season. The Black and Yellows from the Tivoli Stadium had already tried in vain three times to get promoted to the Bundesliga and, in addition to the striker from Neuendorf, also relied on the other recent signings of Rolf Pawellek, Peter Reiter, Peter Schöngen and Christoph Walter.

The coach of Alemannia was the former active member of the Duisburg Spielverein Hans Hoffmann and Ferdinand also had to do his military service in the Gallwitz barracks in Aachen until March 1967. Looking back, Ferdinand does not think much of the coaching qualities of the man from Duisburg and the first half of the season were lost months for not only him, but also for the other newcomers such as Reiter, Schöngen and Walter. The quartet has already been dubbed bad buys in the press. Alemannia went into the winter break in 6th place. The turning point came with Michael Pfeiffer, who was signed as the new coach after the Christmas party. According to Ferdinand's description, he fit in with the team, was a good rhetorician, had a high level of professional competence and was able to release enthusiasm and unimagined footballing powers in the players.

It was a very balanced season with Hamborn 07, Aachen, half-time champion Arminia Bielefeld, Schwarz-Weiß Essen, Rot-Weiß Oberhausen and VfL Bochum alternating for the top. The sextet with title hopes decided the title race only on the last matchday following Bielefeld making no chance at qualifying following a 1–0 defeat against Wuppertaler SV with Schwarz-Weiß Essen competing with Aachen for the winning title and following a 0–0 draw against SSV Hagen, the Black and Yellows won their home game on 15 May 1967 in a 4–0 against Eintracht Duisburg with Ferdinand distinguishing himself for scoring a hat trick. Alemannia won the championship with 48–20 points with Schwarz-Weiß Essen one point behind the runner-up championship. In the Bundesliga promotion round, the West champions held their own with 12–4 points against Kickers Offenbach, 1. FC Saarbrücken, Göttingen 05 and Tennis Borussia Berlin. Ferdinand played all eight promotion playoffs and scored eight goals. He was the top scorer in the 1967 promotion round with Wolfgang Gayer of Borussia Neunkirchen and teammate Alfred Glenski following with seven goals each.

The newly promoted team strengthened for the challenge of the Bundesliga with the signings of Uruguayan nationals Horacio Troche and Juan Carlos Borteiro alongside the signings of local players such as Karl-Heinz Bechmann and Karl-Heinz Krott, but had to cope with a 4–0 home defeat against Bayern Munich in front of 30,000 spectators at the inaugural round on 19 August 1967. Ferdinand got to recognize the upper class of the duo of Franz Beckenbauer and Georg Schwarzenbeck in the defensive centre of the later record champions. In the further course of the round, coach Pfeiffer's team stabilized and finished in 11th place at the end of the season. Ferdinand led the internal scorer list with 14 goals ahead of Glenski with 9 goals and Krott with 7. He had opened the series of his goals on 13 September 1967 in the 2–0 home win against Hamburger SV, when he had to compete with defensive greats such as Jürgen Kurbjuhn, Egon Horst and Willi Schulz. He also scored important goals in the 1–0 win against Werder Bremen, the 1–1 draw against 1. FC Kaiserslautern, the 4–2 and 5–1 wins against 1. FC Köln and Borussia Neunkirchen. He also scored the winning goal in the 2–1 home win against FC Schalke 04 and also scored the 1–1 equalizer in the home game against Werder Bremen on 6 April 1968. He usually formed the attack together with Krott, Herbert Gronen, Heinz-Gerd Klostermann and Glenski, often supported by midfielders Erwin Hoffmann, Karl-Heinz Bechmann and Josef Martinelli.

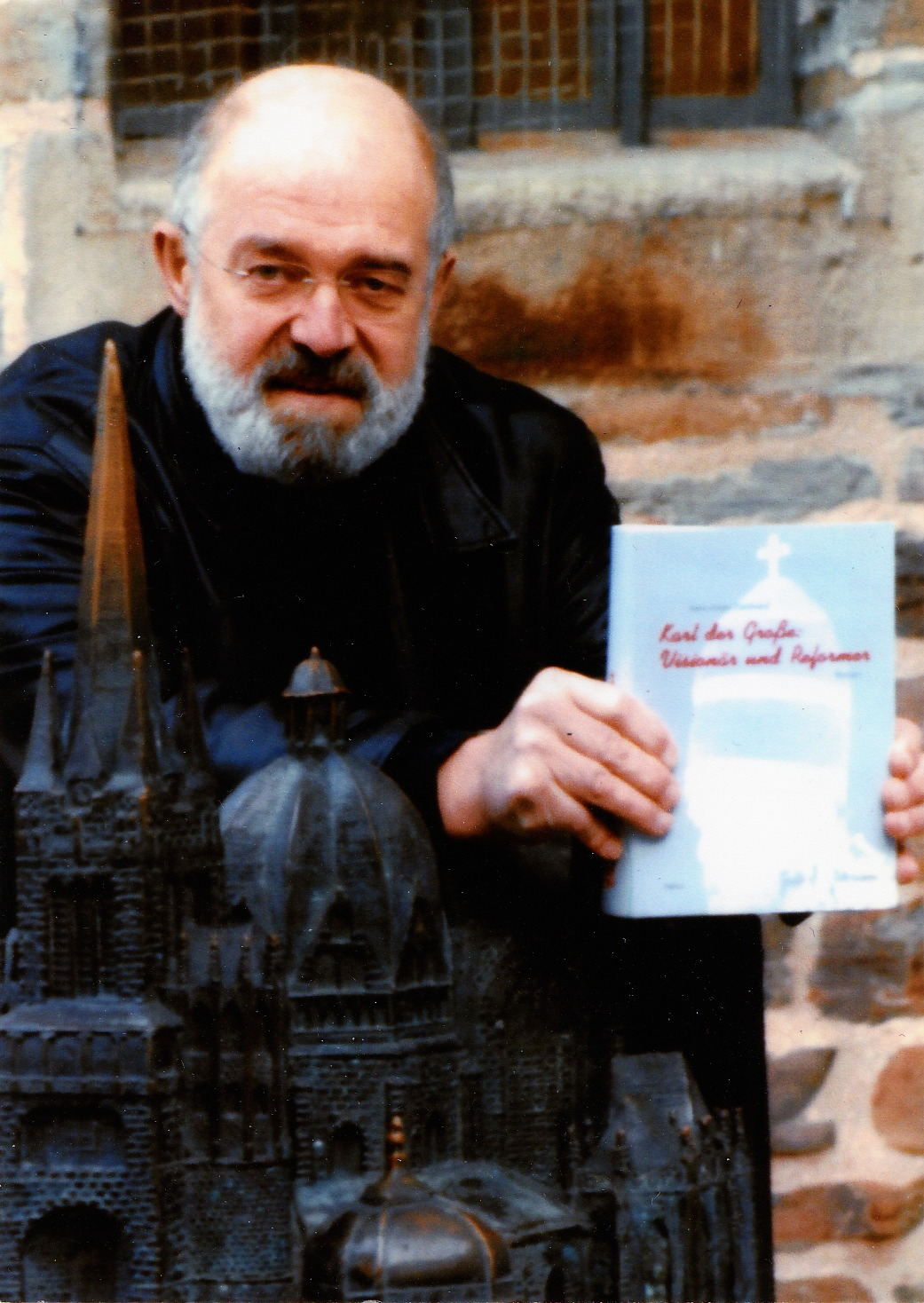
Ferdinand in Aachen with his novel Karl der Große: Visionär und Reformer

When the foreign internationals Roger Claessen and Ion Ionescu were signed for the 1968–69 season, Ferdinand was cleared and moved to play for Chiasso in Switzerland for a transfer fee of 100,000 DM. Chiasso, a border town to Italy and located in the immediate vicinity of Lake Como, developed into a formative experience for Ferdinand. He took particular interest in Ticino with its mild climate, the picturesque towns on Lake Maggiore, Lake Lugano and Lake Como were very impressive for the newcomer from Aachen. He was also fond of Italian cuisine, which had been foreign to him before. In addition to football, he worked part-time in the stock exchange department of the Schweizerische Kreditanstalt at his own request. In his first season, he scored twelve goals for Chiasso. Before the 1969–70 Nationalliga A, the club was strengthened with three players from FC Lugano. Above all, the new acquisitions now gave Ferdinand the appropriate assists as they would use him cleverly repeatedly so that he could play out his goal threat. At the end of the round, he had won the top scorer crown in the Nationalliga with 24 goals.

After two years with top midfield places with 5th and 7th place, Ferdinand returned to Aachen for the 1970–71 season. Since his wife wanted to return to Germany with their two small children and Alemannia Aachen approached him again and president Leo Führung was in Chur in Graubünden on a business trip, the contract negotiations were held there and the striker rejoined Alemannia in the 1970–71 Regionalliga. The striker once again proved to be a reliable goalscorer for the recently relegated team as he scored 15 goals in 21 appearances for the season with the following season he scored 17 goals in 32 games. Under coach Gunther Baumann, the team from the border triangle finished fourth and Ferdinand had shown off his scoring qualities alongside veteran teammates such as goalkeeper Werner Scholz and midfielder Christian Breuer. However, the desired return to the Bundesliga failed, with Aachen he ended up in sixth and fourth place in the final table.

After four appearances in the 1973–74 Regionalliga against Viktoria Köln in a 3–1 victory with two goals, a 2–1 victory against Arminia Bielefeld, a 2–0 loss against Preußen Münster and a 1–0 loss against Schwarz-Weiß Essen, he ended his career as a footballer. In 2013, he was awarded a certificate of gratitude for his 40 years of membership in Alemannia.

Ferdinand remains a regular visitor at Tivoli, where he is noted by supporters for recounting his tenure with Alemannia Aachen.

== Later career ==
Apart from his football career, Ferdinand worked for a building society, served as a real estate agent and within the vending machine industry. Since 2002, he has also published several books on Aachen's local topics, history and faith as an author. He also uses his fame for social causes such as part of a project to improve the literacy rates of Guatemala.
