= 1969–70 Alemannia Aachen season =

Alemannia Aachen
1969–70 season
- Manager: Georg Stollenwerk; Willibert Weth
- Bundesliga: 18th out of 18, relegated
- DFB-Pokal: Semi-finals
- Top goalscorer: League: Jupp Kapellmann (6 goals); All: Jupp Kapellmann (6 goals)
Home colours	Away colours

The 1969–70 Alemannia Aachen season was the 69th season in the club's history and its third season in the Bundesliga with a 36 year long absence until being promoted for the 2006–07 Bundesliga.

== Review and events ==
Following a successful 1968–69 season where the club would become runners-up, the 1969–70 season would be the final season in which Alemannia Aachen would play in the top-flight of German football as they would later be relegated to the Regionalliga West following them reaching last place due to a series of losses. Conversely, the club would experience considerable success during the DFB Pokal, reaching the semifinals of the tournament before being eliminated by 1. FC Köln.

== Squad ==
Note: Flags indicate national team as defined under FIFA eligibility rules; some limited exceptions apply. Players may hold more than one non-FIFA nationality.

No.	Pos.	Nation	Player
—	GK	GER	Gerhard Prokop
—	GK	GER	Werner Scholz
—	DF	GER	Rolf Pawellek
—	DF	GER	Josef Thelen
—	DF	GER	Erwin Hoffmann
—	DF	GER	Karl-Heinz Sell
—	DF	GER	Werner Nievelstein
—	MF	GER	Jupp Kapellmann
—	MF	GER	Erwin Hermandung
—	MF	GER	Christoph Walter
—	MF	GER	Karl-Heinz Bechmann
—	MF	GER	Herbert Gronen

No.	Pos.	Nation	Player
—	MF	GER	Josef Martinelli
—	MF	GER	Werner Pöhler
—	MF	GER	Siegfried Frank
—	FW	GER	Werner Tenbruck
—	FW	ROU	Ion Ionescu
—	FW	GER	Karl-Heinz Krott
—	FW	BEL	Roger Claessen
—	FW	GER	Heinz Liermann
—	FW	GER	Wolfgang Habich
—	FW	GER	Heinz Kulik
—	FW	GER	Jürgen Walbeck
—	FW	GER	Heinz-Gerd Klostermann

== Match results ==
=== Legend ===
Win Draw Loss

=== Bundesliga ===
==== League fixtures and results ====
16 August 1969 1	Alemannia Aachen	0–0	TSV 1860 Munich	Old Tivoli, Aachen
15:30 CET		Report		Attendance: 22,000; Referee: Alfred Ott (Rheinbrohl)

23 August 1969 2	Rot-Weiss Essen	2–0	Alemannia Aachen	Georg-Melches-Stadion, Essen
15:30 CET	Lippens 18', 25'	Report		Attendance: 25,000; Referee: Helmut Fritz (Ludwigshafen)

30 August 1969 3	Hertha BSC	2–1	Alemannia Aachen	Olympiastadion, Munich
15:30 CEST	Brungs 28'; Patzke 88' (pen.)	Report	Krott 81'	Attendance: 30,000; Referee: Elmar Schäfer (Neustadt/Rübenberge)

6 September 1969 4	Alemannia Aachen	4–2	VfB Stuttgart	Old Tivoli, Aachen
15:30 CET	Kapellmann 10', 29'; Claessen (68); Krott (80)	Report	Weidmann 41', 43'	Attendance: 18,000; Referee: Norbert Fuchs (Herdorf)

13 September 1969 5	1. FC Köln	3–0	Alemannia Aachen	Niedersachsenstadion, Hannover
15:30 CEST	Flohe 29'; Rupp 82'; Thelen 88'	Report		Attendance: 32,000; Referee: Horst Herden (Hamburg)

27 September 1969 6	Alemannia Aachen	1–1	Hannover 96	Old Tivoli, Aachen
15:30 CEST	Claessen 77'	Report	Skoblar 17'	Attendance: 12,000; Referee: Kurt Tschenscher (Mannheim)

4 October 1969 7	Hamburger SV	4–1	Alemannia Aachen	Olympiastadion, Berlin
15:30 CET	Seeler 63', 85'; Pötzschke 66'; Schulz 89'	Report	Kapellmann 57'	Attendance: 25,000; Referee: Karl Riegg (Augsburg)

11 October 1969 8	Alemannia Aachen	2–0	Rot-Weiß Oberhausen	Old Tivoli, Aachen
15:30 CEST	Pawellek 35'; Ionescu 68'	Report		Attendance: 19,000; Referee: Oswald Fritz (Ludwigshafen)

15 October 1969 9	FC Schalke 04	3–0	Alemannia Aachen	Glückauf-Kampfbahn, Gelsenkirchen
15:30 CEST		Report	Pohlschmidt 31'; Wittkamp 84'; Neuser 86'	Attendance: 25,000; Referee: Gerd Hennig (Duisburg)

25 October 1969 10	Alemannia Aachen	1–3	Bayern Munich	Old Tivoli, Aachen
15:30 CET	Kapellmann 88'	Report	Schwarzenbeck 18'; Müller 26' (pen.); Beckenbauer 49'	Attendance: 25,000; Referee: Edmund Bien (Ruppertsberg)

31 October 1969 11	Borussia Mönchengladbach	5–1	Alemannia Aachen	Bökelbergstadion, Mönchengladbach
20:00 CEST	Köppel 13'; Laumen 52'; le Fevre 69'; Netzer 76'; Wimmer 87'	Report	Ionescu 43'	Attendance: 25,000; Referee: Helmut Fritz (Ludwigshafen)

8 November 1969 12	Alemannia Aachen	2–1	Eintracht Frankfurt	Old Tivoli, Aachen
15:30 CET	Kapellmann 69'; Tenbruck 84'	Report	Nickel 71'	Attendance: 25,000; Referee: Rudolf Schröck (Riegelsberg)

15 November 1969 13	1. FC Kaiserslautern	3-1	Alemannia Aachen	Betzenberg, Kaiserslautern
15:30 CEST	Krafczyk 5'; Rumor 23'; Friedrich 65'	Report	Kapellmann 75'	Attendance: 32,200; Referee: Walter Horstmann (Groß Escherde)

8 November 1969 14	Alemannia Aachen	3–1	Borussia Dortmund	Old Tivoli, Aachen
20:00 CET	Hermandung 38'; Ionescu 38' (pen.); Hoffmann 83' (pen.)	Report	Weist 79'	Attendance: 9,500; Referee: Franz Heumann (Ansbach)

5 December 1969 15	Eintracht Braunschweig	3–0	Alemannia Aachen	Braunschweig
20:00	Gersdorff 2', 78'; Ulsaß 37'	Report		Stadium: Eintracht-Stadion; Attendance: 8,500; Referee: Fritz Seiler (Schmiden)

12 December 1969 16	Alemannia Aachen	0–0	SV Werder Bremen	Old Tivoli, Aachen
20:00 CET		Report		Attendance: 10,000; Referee: Franz Wengenmeyer (Munich)

20 December 1969 17	MSV Duisburg	2–1	Alemannia Aachen	Wedaustadion, Duisburg
18:00 CEST	Wißmann 30'; Pavlić 87'	Report	Krott 59'	Attendance: 5,000; Referee: Dieter Heckeroth (Frankfurt/Main)

10 March 1970 18	TSV 1860 München	0–0	Alemannia Aachen	Grünwalder Stadion, Munich
15:30 CET		Report		Attendance: 28,000; Referee: Ferdinand Biwersi (Bliesransbach)

17 January 1970 19	Alemannia Aachen	0–0	Rot-Weiss Essen	Old Tivoli, Aachen
15:30 CET		Report		Attendance: 10,000; Referee: Kurt Tschenscher (Mannheim)

24 January 1970 20	Alemannia Aachen	2–4	Hertha BSC	Old Tivoli, Aachen
15:30 CET	Martinelli 10' (pen.); Witt 22' (o.g.)	Report	Gayer 27'; Patzke 44'; Brungs 70', 79'	Attendance: 10,000; Referee: Jan Redelfs (Hannover)

31 January 1970 21	VfB Stuttgart	5–0	Alemannia Aachen	Neckarstadion, Stuttgart
15:30 CEST	Handschuh 8', 62', 78'; Weidmann 15'; Zech 57'	Report		Attendance: 6,000; Referee: Horst Herden (Hamburg)

7 February 1970 22	Alemannia Aachen	1–3	1. FC Köln	Old Tivoli, Aachen
15:30 CET	Hermandung 67'	Report	Simmet 30'; Rupp 50', 62'	Attendance: 20,000; Referee: Heinz Aldinger (Waiblingen)

22 April 1970 23	Hannover 96	5–0	Alemannia Aachen	Niedersachsenstadion, Hannover
19:30 CEST	Siemensmeyer 25', 41', 49' (pen.); Scholz 36' (o.g.); Brune 59'	Report	Jensen 7'; Heynckes 25'	Attendance: 20,000; Referee: Rudolf Schröck (Riegelsberg)

7 April 1970 24	Alemannia Aachen	0–3	Hamburger SV	Old Tivoli, Aachen
19:30 CET		Report	Seeler 36'; Zaczyk 60'	Attendance: 5,000; Referee: Heinz Siebert (Mannheim)

28 February 1970 25	Rot-Weiß Oberhausen	1–0	Alemannia Aachen	Niederrheinstadion, Oberhausen
14:30 CET	Fröhlich 2' (pen.)	Report		Attendance: 20,000; Referee: Walter Horstmann (Groß Escherde)

7 February 1970 26	Alemannia Aachen	1–2	FC Schalke 04	Old Tivoli, Aachen
15:30 CET	Sell 50'	Report	Jürgen Sobieray 18'; Pohlschmidt 42'	Attendance: 11,000; Referee: Klaus Ohmsen (Hamburg)

14 March 1970 27	Bayern Munich	6–0	Alemannia Aachen	Grünwalder Stadion, Munich
15:30 CET	Müller 18', 84' (pen.); Pötzschke 66'; Schulz 89'	Report	Kupferschmidt 28'; Beckenbauer 58'; Roth 62', 69'	Attendance: 11,500; Referee: Walter Engel (Reimsbach)

21 March 1970 28	Alemannia Aachen	0–3	Borussia Mönchengladbach	Old Tivoli, Aachen
15:30 CET		Report	Martinelli 36' (o.g.); Laumen 63'; Sieloff 87'	Attendance: 16,000; Referee: Gerhard Schulenburg (Laatzen)

11 April 1970 29	Eintracht Frankfurt	6–2	Alemannia Aachen	Waldstadion, Frankfurt
15:30 CET	Grabowski 41' (pen.), 85'; Kalb 60'; Nickel 67'; Hesse 73'; Hölzenbein 87'	Report	Hermandung 37', 66'	Attendance: 10,000; Referee: Ferdinand Biwersi (Bliesransbach)

15 April 1970 30	Alemannia Aachen	1–1	1. FC Kaiserslautern	Old Tivoli, Aachen
19:30 CET	Hoffmann 66'	Report	Fuchs 9'	Attendance: 2,000; Referee: Franz Heumann (Ansbach)

11 April 1970 31	Borussia Dortmund	3–1	Alemannia Aachen	Stadion Rote Erde, Dortmund
15:30 CET	Wosab 2'; Neuberger 14'; Weist 22'	Report	Walter 41'	Attendance: 6,000; Referee: Gerd Hennig (Duisburg)

18 April 1970 32	Alemannia Aachen	1–1	Eintracht Braunschweig	Old Tivoli, Aachen
19:30 CET	Pöhler 19'	Report	Ulsaß 12'	Attendance: 3,000; Referee: Ewald Regely (Berlin)

30 April 1970 33	SV Werder Bremen	4–1	Alemannia Aachen	Weserstadion, Bremen
20:00 CEST	Görts 12', 44', 53'; Höttges 67'	Report	Tenbruck 56'	Attendance: 6,000; Referee: Franz Mühling (Kassel)

3 May 1970 34	Alemannia Aachen	3–2	MSV Duisburg	Old Tivoli, Aachen
20:00 CET	Tenbruck 6'; Kulik 19'; Gronen 39'	Report	Sondermann 51'; Rettkowski 76'	Attendance: 2,500; Referee: Manfred Hamer (Bockum-Hövel)

=== DFB-Pokal ===
11 July 1970 First round	Arminia Hannover	0–3	Alemannia Aachen	Bischofsholer Damm, Hannover
15:30 CET		Report	Walter 41'	Attendance: 3,000; Referee: Peter Gabor (Berlin)

29 July 1970 Round of 16	Alemannia Aachen	1–1	Werder Bremen	Old Tivoli, Aachen
19:30 CET		Report		Attendance: 8,000; Referee: Heinz Siebert (Mannheim)

3 August 1970 Round of 16	Werder Bremen	1–1	Alemannia Aachen	Weserstadion, Bremen
19:30 CET		Report		Attendance: 9,000; Referee: Alfons Betz (Regensburg)

6 August 1970 Quarter-finals	Alemannia Aachen	1–0	Hertha BSC	Old Tivoli, Aachen
20:00 CET		Report	Hoffmann 89' (pen.)	Attendance: 20,000; Referee: Heinz Aldinger (Waiblingen)

19 August 1970 Semi-finals	Alemannia Aachen	1–1	Werder Bremen	Old Tivoli, Aachen
20:00 CET		Report	Löhr 23', 29'; Flohe 73'; Overath 86'	Attendance: 32,000; Referee: Klaus Ohmsen (Hamburg)
