= Christoph Walter =

German footballer (1940–2009)

- Walter in the 1969–70 season

Personal information
- Full name: Christoph Walter
- Date of birth: 5 November 1943
- Place of birth: Breslau, Silesia, Germany
- Date of death: 25 February 1995 (aged 51)
- Height: 1.76 m (5 ft 9 in)
- Position: Right winger

Youth career
- 1961–1962: TSV Marl-Hüls U19

Senior career*
Years	Team	Apps	(Gls)
1962–1966	TSV Marl-Hüls		
1966–1967	FSV Frankfurt		
1967–1976	Alemannia Aachen	159	(32)
1976–1977	FSV 09 Geilenkirchen		
- * Club domestic league appearances and goals

Christoph Walter (5 November 1943 – 25 February 1995) was a German footballer. He played as a midfielder for various clubs throughout the 1960s and 1970s, notably playing for Alemannia Aachen during their brief spell at the Bundesliga during the late 1960s.

== Career ==
=== Marl-Hüls and Frankfurt ===
Walter began his career by playing in the youth sector of TSV Marl-Hüls as he would play played 18 league games in the last year of the old top-flight 1962–63 Oberliga following his promotion to the senior squad in 1960 under the young coach Rudi Gutendorf, scoring three goals. With the blue and whites in the northern Ruhr area, he gained experience alongside his teammates Karl-Heinz Sell, Horst Wandolek and Heinz van Haaren. He made his first appearance on 28 October 1962 in the 2–1 away defeat against his future club Alemannia Aachen, where he made his debut as a right winger. On 17 February 1963, he scored two goals on the half-right against international goalkeeper Hans Tilkowski in a 4–0 win against Westfalia Herne. Four weeks later, the 19-year-old talent scored the winning goal in front of 13,000 spectators in the 1–0 home win against Borussia Dortmund. With the team from the Jahnstadion, Walter, who was used in the offensive in his early years, played in the inaugural first two seasons from 1963 to 1965, in the new second-tier Regionalliga West. In the debut season of the 1963–64 Regionalliga, the blue and whites made an excellent start with 15–3 points. TSV had opened the round on 4 August 1963 with a 0–0 draw against Fortuna Düsseldorf under new coach Hennes Hoffmann. In the second half of the season, the 1–0 win on 12 April 1964 at eventual champions Alemannia Aachen and the 2–1 home win a week later against Borussia Mönchengladbach with their talents Horst-Dieter Höttges, Heinz Lowin, Rudolf Pöggeler, Egon Milder, Ulrich Kohn and Günter Netzer standing out. At the end of the season, TSV Marl-Hüls finished in an excellent fourth place. In the succeeding season, this performance could not be repeated under the new coach Hans Hipp with Marl-Hüls finishing in 15th place and Walter ended his tenure at TSV after 68 Regionalliga games with nine goals as he accepted an offer from FSV Frankfurt from the Regionalliga Süd and moved to the Main metropolis for the 1965–66 Regionalliga.

He moved to the Bornheimer Hang in Frankfurt with coach Hoffmann and his teammate Ewald Schöngen. He had a solid record with 30 appearances and 14 goals, but FSV could only make 14th place. The only outstanding victory in the second half of the season on 9 April 1966 was the 5–2 victory in the home game in front of 12,000 spectators against Kickers Offenbach. Coach Hoffmann later took over Alemannia Aachen in the west for the 1966–67 Regionalliga with Walter following his coach to the Black and Yellows in the cathedral city.

=== Alemannia Aachen ===
In addition to Walter, his former teammates of Rolf Pawellek and Peter Schöngen from his former club of TSV Marl-Hüls also had arrived at Tivoli with Austrian player Peter Reiter also being considered to play for the club. Fans of Aachen would excitedly proclaim that:

We don't need Seeler, no Brülls, because we get our players from Marl-Hüls.

Walter initially had a hard time in his efforts to be part of the starting eleven, especially since coach Hoffmann was also replaced by ex-Aachen player Michael Pfeiffer from 20 January 1967. In total, he only made 13 appearances in the Regionalliga season and scored one goal. In the last ten round games, however, he was part of the regular line-up, which was able to win the championship with a one-point lead over Schwarz-Weiß Essen. In the successful promotion round against the competition from Offenbach, 1. FC Saarbrücken, 1. SC Göttingen 05 and Tennis Borussia Berlin as he played all eight games.

When the Bundesliga newcomers secured the league in 1967–68 season with eleventh place, Walter was also active in only ten games for Alemannia. At the highlight of Aachen's club history, the runner-up championship in the 1968–69 season with 31 appearances and one goal alongside Werner Scholz with 30 appearances, Erwin Hermandung with a record of 33–11, Rolf Pawellek with 32–3, Josef Thelen with 34–1, Erwin Hoffmann with 30–3, Heinz-Gerd Klostermann with 34–12, Roger Claessen with 29-9 and Josef Martinelli with 28–1. He would notably play in the 4–1 victory against defending champions 1. FC Nürnberg, scoring an own goal during the match. When Aachen was surprisingly relegated in the 1969–70 season, he made the most appearances behind Hermandung with 34-4 and Pawellek with 34–1 as he would make 33 league games and one goal.

In the four following rounds in the Regionalliga West from the 1970–71 season to 1973–74 season and the inaugural season of the 1974–75 2. Bundesliga, Walter, who was now the first in defense, was a regular member of the Alemannia starting line-up, but their attempts in returning to the Bundesliga were all in vain. They would reach fourth place in the 1971–72 season under coach Günther Baumann as this would be their best attempt in making a return to the top-flight of German football. With 42–26 points, however, Aachen had no serious chance to intervene in the playoffs at the top between champion Wuppertaler SV with a record of 60–08 and runner-up Rot-Weiss Essen with a record of 54–14. The outstanding goal scorer of the team from the Bergisch region, Günter Pröpper, scored 52 goals in the season alone. In total, the combative team player played 162 competitive games for Alemannia from 1970 to 1975 under the coaches Hermann Lindemann, Volker Kottmann, Gunther Baumann, Barthel Thomas, Michael Pfeiffer and Horst Witzler and scored 13 goals.

With the 38th matchday of 15 June 1975, which brought Aachen a 2–0 home defeat against Arminia Bielefeld, Walter ended his playing career at Alemannia Aachen after nine seasons. He played his last match alongside goalkeeper Gerd Prokop and the outfield players Josef Bläser, Peter Stollwerk, Christian Breuer, Rolf Pawellek, Hans Schulz, Hans Kodric, Peter Hermann, Rolf Kucharski and Antoine Fagot.

Walter described his tenure with Alemannia as being particularly memorable, stating that:

Starting with the 1966/67 championship, through the promotion round with reaching the 1st Bundesliga and continuing with the great games in the three years of Bundesliga appearance, including the duels against Overath, Küppers, Beckenbauer and Uwe Seeler. The biggest: the German runner-up.

He ended his active playing career with FSV 09 Geilenkirchen in the 1975–76 season.
