= Werner Nievelstein =

German footballer (1941–2023)

- Nievelstein in the 1969–70 season

Personal information
- Full name: Werner Nievelstein
- Date of birth: 12 February 1941
- Place of birth: Herzogenrath, Cologne-Aachen, Germany
- Date of death: 31 March 2023 (aged 82)
- Place of death: Herzogenrath, North Rhine-Westphalia, Germany
- Height: 1.75 m (5 ft 9 in)
- Positions: Right-back; midfielder

Youth career
- ???–1958: SuS Herzogenrath

Senior career*
Years	Team	Apps	(Gls)
1958–1970	Alemannia Aachen	225	
1971–1975	SuS Herzogenrath		
- * Club domestic league appearances and goals

Werner Nievelstein (12 February 1941 – 31 March 2023) was a German footballer. Nicknamed "Futt", he played as a right-back and as a midfielder throughout his career with Alemannia Aachen in the 1960s, overseeing the clubs brief promotion to the Bundesliga until its relegation in 1970.

== Career ==
Nievelstein moved from the youth of SuS Herzogenrath in 1958 to the Oberliga club Alemannia Aachen. In the 1960–61 season, the former player of the amateur team was taken over into the contract squad of the Oberliga team. On the tenth matchday, 16 October 1960, he made his debut as a right-back in the home game against Meidericher SV in the Oberliga West. In the fourth minute of the game, he caused the "Zebras" to take a 1-0 lead with an own goal. Two goals from Alfred Glenski secured the 2-1 home victory. At the end of the round, Alemannia was in eighth place and Nievelstein had played 17 games. In the last two seasons of the high league Oberliga 1961–62 and 1962–63, he was on the pitch in all 60 competitive games for the team from Old Tivoli. The last Oberliga match was played on 11 May 1963 with Aachen defeating Bayer Leverkusen 2-1 to finish the season in fifth place. Nievelstein formed the defensive pair with Herbert Krisp and secured the game-defining line of runners with Josef Martinelli, Branko Zebec and Christian Breuer. In total, the defender made 78 Oberliga appearances from 1960 to 1963.

Since Aachen had not been nominated for the Bundesliga, which had its inaugural first season, Nievelstein played with Alemannia from 1963–64 to 1966–67 in the substructure of the Bundesliga, the Regionalliga West. Although he was able to celebrate becoming the annual Regionalliga West champions in the 1963–64 season, the club would fail to qualify in the promotional round. Even as runners-up in the 1964–65 Regionalliga, Alemannia could not hold their own in the promotion round but had a successful run in the 1964–65 DFB-Pokal After victories over VfL Osnabrück, Rot-Weiß Oberhausen, Hannover 96 and in the semi-finals against FC Schalke 04, Nievelstein had difficulties facing Reinhard Libuda. Following the club's eventual victory, the team from the Regionalliga West made it to the cup final against Borussia Dortmund in Hanover on 22 May 1965. The Bundesliga team prevailed with 2-0 goals with Nievelstein had mostly fought hard duels with Reinhold Wosab.

After the second championship in the 1966–67 Regionalliga, in the second half of the season, the managerial position had changed from Hennes Hoffmann to Michael Pfeiffer, the team centered captain Jupp Martinelli prevailed in the promotional playoffs and achieved promotion to the Bundesliga. On the important opening day of 20 May 1967, Nievelstein formed the defender pair together with Christoph Walter in the 2-1 home win against Kickers Offenbach. In the 3-2 away defeat at the Bieberer Berg in Offenbach, on 10 June, he would play alongside fellow defender Josef Thelen. When promotion was made perfect with the 3-1 home win against Göttingen 05 on 25 June, Rolf Pawellek played at his side. From 1963 to 1967, the defender played 128 games for Alemannia Aachen in the Regionalliga West. Martinelli would describe Nievelstein as being a "quiet, very likeable guy" as the two would develop a friendship as they would often go on walks together.

Werner Nievelstein played 20 Bundesliga games from 1967 to 1970 and was also part of the club's squad in the 1968–69 season where Alemannia Aachen would become runners-up. Around this time, Nievelstein was jokingly described as an own goal specialist in the team's fan anthem of the Drei Atömchen. In a retrospective, he cited the reasoning for the club's success in the decade as being the following:

The games for the DFB Cup in the 1964/65 season. From the first game at SV Baesweiler to the final in Hannover against Borussia Dortmund, I was involved in all matches. […] The great enthusiasm at the international floodlit matches against top teams from all over the world, when the spectators turned the Tivoli into a sea of lights with their matches and lighters. […] The sporting and not the money was in the foreground.

Following the expiration of his contract with Alemannia Aachen following the 1969–70 season where the club would ultimately be relegated from the highest tier of German football, Nievelstein returned to his hometown club SuS Herzogenrath and ended his career in the 1974–75 as an amateur player. From 1960 to 1970, Nievelstein played 225 championship games for Alemannia Aachen in the Oberliga, Regionalliga and Bundesliga.
