= Erwin Hoffmann =

German footballer (1940–2009)

- Hoffmann in the 1968–69 season

Personal information
- Full name: Erwin Hoffmann
- Date of birth: 28 October 1940
- Place of birth: Lübeck, Schleswig-Holstein, Germany
- Date of death: 10 September 2009 (aged 68)
- Height: 1.81 m (5 ft 11 in)
- Positions: Defender; midfielder

Senior career*
Years	Team	Apps	(Gls)
1960–1961	Phönix Lübeck		
1961–1966	TSG Ulm		
1966–1972	Alemannia Aachen	159	(32)
1972–1973	RFC Raeren		
1973–1974	SC Aachen 10		
- * Club domestic league appearances and goals

Erwin Hoffmann (28 October 1940 – 10 September 2009) was a German football player and coach. He played as a defender and as a midfielder for various clubs throughout the 1960s and 1970s, notably playing for Alemannia Aachen throughout their brief spell in the Bundesliga.

== Career ==
=== Lübeck and Ulm ===
In the 1960–61 season, the young half-forward Erwin Hoffmann played at Travemünder Allee, with the blue-white-red eagle bearers of Phönix Lübeck, in the amateur league of Schleswig-Holstein and won the runner-up championship with his teammates. He signed a contract with TSG Ulm 1846 for the 1961–62 season and thus moved to the 2. Liga Süd. His new teammate, Wolfgang Fahrian, the goalkeeper of the Ulm "Spatzen", played his way into the national team in the course of the season and Ulm returned to the Oberliga Süd as runners-up behind Hessen Kassel. In the last year of the Oberliga's old top flight of the 1962–63 season, the returnee finished in a safe eighth place alongside Fahrian, Dieter Praxl, Manfred Ruoff and Helmut Siebert with Hoffmann scoring nine goals in 17 appearances. However, due to the newly installed Bundesliga for the 1963–64 season, Ulm and Hoffmann went back to the second division with the Regionalliga Süd. After 38 round-robin games with the first southern regional league with 20 clubs, Ulm finished eighth again at the end of the season. Despite Fahrian already participating in the 1962 FIFA World Cup by this point, the Ulm defense conceded 74 goals and was therefore unable to intervene for the fight at the top of the table despite the good offense around Hoffmann, Praxl, Siebert and Gerold Stocker. The two games won against Bayern Munich were outstanding. In the home game on 15 December 1963, Hoffmann and colleagues won 3-2 and in the second half of the season on 17 May 1964 in Munich, with 6-4 goals against the Bavarians, who were prominently staffed by Sepp Maier, Herbert Erhardt, Karl Borutta, Rainer Ohlhauser, Dieter Brenninger, Dieter Koulmann and Werner Ipta.

Weakened by the departures of Wolfgang Fahrian and Helmut Siebert, Ulm collapsed in the 1964–65 Regionalliga and was relegated to the amateur camp in 18th place. Erwin Hoffmann had scored 22 goals in 65 games for Ulm in the two seasons of the Regionalliga and signed a new contract with Alemannia Aachen in the Regionalliga West for the 1965–66 season.

=== Alemannia Aachen ===
Prior to Hoffmann's signing with the club, Aachen had won the title once in the two years at the 1963–64 Regionalliga and finished runners-up behind Borussia Mönchengladbach in the subsequent season but had failed in the promotion playoffs each time. The penalty specialist, equipped with a feeling for combination play with overview and calmness, made his debut in Aachen on 15 August 1965 in a 3–0 home victory against Eintracht Duisburg in the starting line-up for the Black and Yellows. With the attacking line-up of Heinz-Gerd Klostermann, Alfred Glenski, Hoffmann, Manfred Otta and Karl-Heinz Sell, coach Oswald Pfau started the third attempt. In 30 games, the newcomer from Ulm scored 16 goals for Aachen, with 97 goals Alemannia had the most successful attack, but Fortuna Düsseldorf and Rot-Weiss Essen prevailed at the top of the table with Aachen remaining in third place. The home record of 31:3 points was first-class, but the 20:14 away points barred entry into the promotional playoffs. The 3–1 defeat on 15 May 1966 against Essen, their direct rival for second place, was of decisive importance. With a two-point lead with Essen ahead with a record of 53-15 and Aachen with 51–17, the team from Hafenstraße moved into the promotion round and was later admitted into the Bundesliga.

In his second year in Aachen in the 1966–67 season, the change of coach under president Leo Führung in January 1967 from Hennes Hoffmann (no relation) to Michael Pfeiffer who brought the decisive boost needed for promotion. After the 2–1 defeat against Preußen Münster on 5 March, Josef Martinelli and Erwin Hoffmann did not lose a game and won the championship with 48-20 points, just ahead of Schwarz-Weiß Essen with only 47-21 points alongside Arminia Bielefeld and VfL Bochum with 45-23 points each and thus moved back into the promotion playoffs. There, Aachen prevailed with 12:4 points - two points ahead of Kickers Offenbach and was successfully promoted to the Bundesliga. Hoffmann advanced to the control station of the Tivoli eleven in the promotion season and made 34 appearances with four goals. In the 1966–67 DFB-Pokal, Aachen also only ended the competition in the semi-finals with a 3–1 defeat against Hamburger SV on 6 May 1967.

Alemannia started the 1967–68 Bundesliga with 0–4 points and on 2 September 1967, they won their first double point with two goals from Martinelli, when Karlsruher SC received a decisive goal in the 88th minute to win 2–1 at home. Hoffmann with a record of 32–4, together with Jupp Martinelli with 33–3, Herbert Gronen with 32–2, Erwin Hermandung with 31-4 and Karl-Heinz Bechmann with 31–3, formed the starting XI of coach Pfeiffer's team, which finished eleventh at the end of the league. From 14 June to 6 July, Hoffmann was then part of the Aachen delegation that carried out a trip to South America lasting several weeks, playing in three friendlies against Brazilian club Flamengo, Uruguayan club Nacional and Argentinian club Boca Juniors.

Before the second Bundesliga series in 1968–69, there was an expectant mood in Aachen, fueled by the signings of Roger Claessen, Ion Ionescu, Hans-Josef Kapellmann, Werner Tenbruck and Werner Scholz for a good placement of Alemannia in the Bundesliga. He would also play in the opening victory on 17 August 1968 with 4-1 goals against defending champions 1. FC Nürnberg. From the sixth preliminary round matchday, however, a losing streak of 0–10 points followed and Hoffmann, who was now playing in the libero position, was in 14th place with his teammates with 8–12 points. With a record of 22-12 points in the second half of the season, however, the Black and Yellows finished runners-up in the championship with 38–30 points at the end of the round behind the sovereign champions FC Bayern Munich. On the final day, 7 June 1969, this placement was defended with a 1–0 away win against Hertha BSC. Hoffmann had played in 30 games and contributed three goals to Alemannia Aachen's greatest success.

The runners-up went into the 1969–70 Bundesliga with new coach Georg Stollenwerk and the unchanged squad of players from the successful previous year, there were no new signings. The start was negative with 0–6 points, and the ex-national player Stollenwerk was dismissed after the 16th matchday on 12 December 1969 in 17th place with 11–21 points. His successor was Willibert Weth, who had already stepped in as Oswald Pfau's successor in the 1965–66 season. However, captain and libero Erwin Hoffmann was out for almost the entire second half of the season due to a meniscus operation with him only being able to play in the last four games which resulted in Aachen being relegated to the Regionalliga. He played his last Bundesliga game on matchday 34 on 3 May 1970, in the final 3–2 home win against MSV Duisburg with a final Bundesliga record of 83 appearances and 9 goals.

However, the aftermath of his injury ended the continuation of his playing career at Alemannia Aachen after the Regionalliga match on 17 January 1971 against Bonner SC. In the eighth minute of the game, Hoffmann was substituted in Bonn due to another injury and was unable to play a game for the Tivoli team after that. From 1965 to 1971, he played a total of 66 games for the Black and Yellows, scoring 21 goals in the Regionalliga and 83 games in the Bundesliga scoring nine goals.

In a retrospective, Hoffmann described his outstanding events of his active time at Alemannia Aachen in Franz Creutz's book:

In addition to the highlights such as promotion to the Bundesliga and runners-up, I have fond memories of the cup match against Karlsruher SC on Carnival Saturday 1967. In the first half, I scored a flawless hat-trick, and that's not the only reason why the 30,000 spectators enthusiastically shouted 'Oche alaaf' three times.

In the 1972–73 season, he tried again to revive his playing career abroad at RFC Raeren in Belgium, but in 1973 he held the position of player-coach at SC Aachen 10 and then became a youth coach at Alemannia.

His son Dino played for Alemannia from 1997 to 1999 in the Regionalliga West–Südwest, being part of the promotional team in 1999.
