= Rolf Pawellek =

German footballer (1939–2022)

- Pawellek in the 1969–70 season

Personal information
- Full name: Rolf Pawellek
- Date of birth: 10 September 1939
- Place of birth: Gelsenkirchen, Westphalia-North, Germany
- Date of death: 5 March 2022 (aged 82)
- Place of death: Warstein, North Rhine-Westphalia, Germany
- Height: 1.79 m (5 ft 10 in)
- Positions: Defender; center forward; left winger

Youth career
- SC Buer-Hassel

Senior career*
Years	Team	Apps	(Gls)
1955–1963	Sportfreunde Gladbeck		
1964–1966	TSV Marl-Hüls	96	(16)
1966–1972	Alemannia Aachen	150	(8)
1972–1974	Eschweiler SG		
1974–1978	Kohlscheider BC		
1978–1983	Haarener FV		
- * Club domestic league appearances and goals

Rolf Pawellek (10 September 1939 – 5 March 2022) was a German footballer. He played as a defender for various clubs throughout the 1960s and the 1970s, notably playing for Alemannia Aachen during their initial run in the Bundesliga.

== Career ==
=== Early career ===
Pawellek began his career with SC Buer-Hassel during his youth until he would begin his senior career with Sportfreunde Gladbeck at only the age of 16. He would gain experience within the Regionalliga West and from 1958 to 1961, he was supported by club manager and former Schalke player Hermann Eppenhoff. This would last until the inaugural 1963–64 Regionalliga where he would accept the offer by TSV Marl-Hüls with the season being an overall success for Pawellek as well as his teammates. Pawellek would make his official debut for the club on 4 August 1963 in a 0–0 draw against Fortuna Düsseldorf.

He would quickly become part of the starting XI for the club alongside Heinz van Haaren, Karl-Heinz Sell and Christoph Walter under manager Hennes Hoffmann. For the second half of the season, he would have a brief spell where he played as a center forward in three successful games against runners-up Wuppertaler SV, champions Alemannia Aachen and 1964–65 Regionalliga champions Borussia Mönchengladbach. By the end of the season, the club would finish fourth behind Alemannia Aachen, Wuppertal and Fortuna Düsseldorf. The club's subsequent season wouldn't meet the amount of success and fell to 15th place under manager Hans Hipp. A highlight of this season would occur on 30 August 1964 in the inaugural game against Mönchengladbach with it ending in a 1–0 loss through a goal by Werner Waddey in the 89th minute. Playing as a midfielder around this time, he headed the defense and had to deal with the series of attacks by Rudolf Pöggeler, Jupp Heynckes, Bernd Rupp, Günter Netzer and Waddey. By the time of the 1966 FIFA World Cup, Marl-Hüls would end in 13th place with notable victories being against Alemannia Aachen (2–0), VfL Bochum (1–0) and Rot-Weiß Essen (2–1) stood out. From 1963 to 1966, Pawellek played 96 competitive games in the Regionalliga West, scoring 15 goals before signing a new contract with Alemannia Aachen for the 1966–67 Regionalliga and moved to the cathedral city.

=== Alemannia Aachen ===
He made his debut for the Black and Yellows immediately on the opening day in a 3–1 home win against Hamborn 07 as a left winger in the league team. Together with Josef Martinelli and Josef Thelen, he formed the line of runners. At the end of the round, he had contributed in 31 appearances and one goal to Aachen winning the championship in the Regionalliga West with one point ahead of Schwarz-Weiß Essen. In the promotional round, he and his teammates under coach Michael Pfeiffer prevailed with two points ahead of main rivals Kickers Offenbach and were able to achieve promotion to the Bundesliga. Following this, he would take part in a tour across South America in 1968 where the club would play in several friendlies against Brazilian club Flamengo, Uruguayan club Nacional and Argentinian club Boca Juniors. During the club's second season in the 1968–69 Bundesliga, Alemannia Aachen would achieve a great success by finishing the tournament as runners-up. The season began on 17 August 1968 with an unexpected 4–1 victory at the reigning German champions 1. FC Nürnberg. On 30 November 1968, Rolf Pawellek gave Aachen a 1–0 lead against 1. FC Köln in the 15th minute and Aachen won the game 2–1. [3] On 26 April 1969, Hamburger SV was defeated 2–0 as second in the table, he mainly had to deal with Gert Dörfel on the left wing. However, he still found the opportunity to participate in the offensive and set up the 1–0 lead by Erwin Hermandung in the 66th minute. On the last matchday on 7 June 1969, the Black and Yellows from Tivoli finished runners-up with a 1–0 away win against Hertha BSC. Pawellek defended on the right and met the wing talent Arno Steffenhagen. In 32 league games, the defender scored three goals for the runners-up, one point ahead of Borussia Mönchengladbach and Eintracht Braunschweig.

When the previous year's runners-up suffered relegation to the Regionalliga West in the 1969–70 season, only two Alemanni, Hermandung and Pawellek, would play in all 34 league games. In total, the defender made 93 league appearances in three seasons within the Bundesliga, scoring five goals. From 1970 to 1972, Pawellek played 57 competitive games for Aachen in the second-tier Regionalliga, scoring three goals. His last Regionalliga game dates back to 14 May 1972, where Alemannia would lose with 0–2 against SVA Gütersloh. Following the 1971–72 Regionalliga, the commercial employee continued his football career for various amateur clubs throughout the 1970s and the early 1980s at Eschweiler SG, Kohlscheider BC, Haarener FV.
