= Heinz-Gerd Klostermann =

German footballer (1944–2021)

- Klostermann in 1968

Personal information
- Full name: Heinz-Gerd Klostermann
- Date of birth: 22 October 1944
- Place of birth: Eschweiler, Cologne-Aachen, Germany
- Date of death: 9 August 2021 (aged 76)
- Height: 1.80 m (5 ft 11 in)
- Position: Forward

Senior career*
Years	Team	Apps	(Gls)
1963–1964	Eschweiler SG		
1964–1972	Alemannia Aachen		
1972–1980	Westwacht Aachen		
- * Club domestic league appearances and goals

Heinz-Gerd Klostermann (22 October 1944 – 9 August 2021) was a German footballer. Nicknamed Kalle, he played as a forward for Alemannia Aachen and Westwacht Aachen throughout the 1960s and the 1970s, notably playing for the former during their brief stint at the Bundesliga.

== Career ==
The fast attacker on the wing finished 10th in the Verbandsliga Mittelrhein in the 1962–63 season with his hometown club Eschweiler SG. He caught the eye of the scouts of Alemannia Aachen alongside fellow forward Karl-Heinz Krott and was brought to the Tivoli for the 1963–64 Regionalliga alongside Herbert Gronen from Borussia Brand, Willi Krieger from SG Düren 99 and goalkeeper Gerhard Prokop from Sportfreunde Gladbeck. In his first year in the second-tier Regionalliga West, he did not make a competitive appearance. Under coach Oswald Pfau, Klostermann made his debut on the opening day of the 1964–65 season on 9 August 1964 in a 2–0 away defeat at Eintracht Gelsenkirchen in the Regionalliga West. Coach Pfau had brought the forward to the start in the formation of Klostermann, Franz-Josef Nacken, Josef Martinelli, Gronen and Rainer Schönwälder. At the end of the season, Klostermann had scored five goals in 24 league appearances and Aachen reached the runner-up position behind champions and BL newcomers Borussia Mönchengladbach.

He played as a striker from 1964 to 1970 in the Bundesliga and the Regionalliga West for Alemannia Aachen. With Alemannia, he reached the final against Borussia Dortmund in the 1965 DFB-Pokal final. Klostermann played in the 3–1 victory against VfL Osnabrück, the 1–0 victory against Rot-Weiß Oberhausen, the 2–1 victory against Hannover 96 and in the semi-finals on 17 April 1965 at Old Tivoli in front of 32,000 spectators, the 4–3 win against FC Schalke 04 but was unable to play in the final. In the 1966–67 season, Klostermann and his teammates became champions of the Regionalliga West with Aachen and secured promotion following the promotion playoffs to the Bundesliga. He played a total of 59 Bundesliga games with 16 goals and 79 games in the Regionalliga West, in which he scored 21 goals. He also scored nine goals in 22 cup appearances.

Klostermann's most successful period was the 1968–69 season where he was runner-up with Aachen and also played a strong season personally, being one of two players to play all 34 games of the season under coach Michael Pfeiffer alongside Josef Thelen. With 12 goals, he led the internal scorer list ahead of Erwin Hermandung with 11 goals, Roger Claessen with 9 and Ion Ionescu with 7. For the 1969–70 season, however, he injured his cruciate ligament in a pre-season game which rendered him unable to play for the season. Without him, the reigning runners-up Aachen were relegated to the second division as the bottom of the table.

Following his tenure with Alemannia, he was still an amateur at Westwacht Aachen and Stolberger SV as a player and coach. He lived in Büsbach as he would late return to Alemannia Aachen as a talent scout and from 1999 to 2001, as commercial director.
