= Gerd Saborowski =

German footballer (1943–2026)

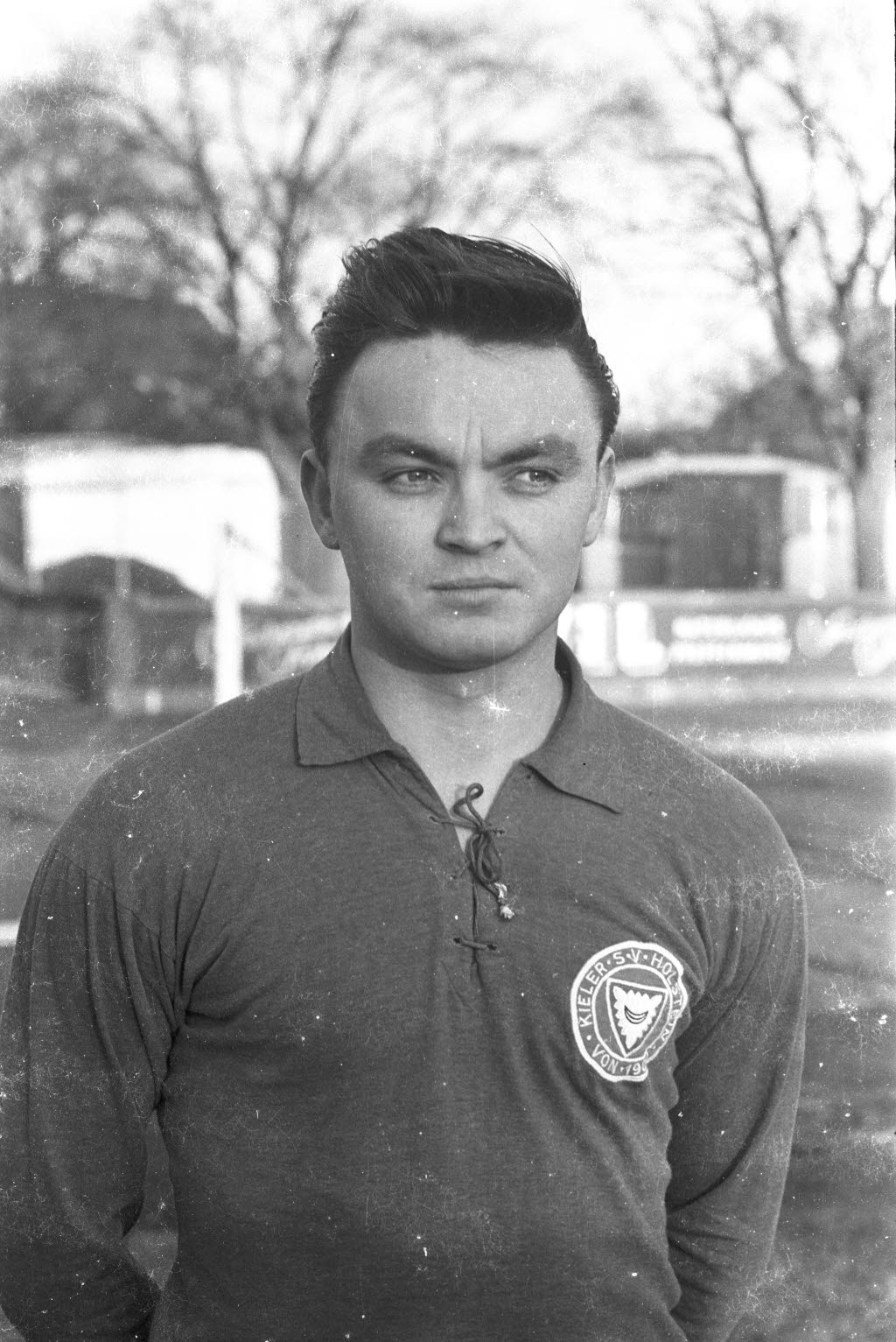
- Saborowski in 1965 with Holstein Kiel

Personal information
- Date of birth: 3 September 1943
- Place of birth: Altendorf, Germany
- Date of death: 11 September 2026 (aged 83)
- Height: 1.73 m (5 ft 8 in)
- Position: Striker

Youth career
- TSV Siems

Senior career*
Years	Team	Apps	(Gls)
1963–1966	Holstein Kiel		
1966–1971	Eintracht Braunschweig	75	(12)
1971–1972	Holstein Kiel		
1973–?	TSV Siems		

International career
1966–1967	West Germany U23	3	(0)
- * Club domestic league appearances and goals

Gerd Saborowski (3 September 1943 – 11 September 2026) was a German professional footballer who played as a striker. He spent five seasons in the Bundesliga with Eintracht Braunschweig.

== Career ==
Saborowski grew up in in Lübeck and began playing at local club TSV Siems. During his time there he was called up the 1962 UEFA European Under-18 Championship by head coach Helmut Schön and received offers from other clubs including VfB Lübeck and Phönix Lübeck but he remained with Siems, playing in the country's second-highest division. He joined Holstein Kiel in 1963, scoring 14 goals in his first Regionalliga season. He became top scorer of the 1964–65 Regionalliga Nord, helping Kiel reach the Bundesliga promotion play-offs. At Holstein Kiel he scored 70 goals in three years.

In 1966 Saborowski signed with Eintracht Braunschweig, reuniting with head coach Helmuth Johannsen, who had briefly coached him at Holstein Kiel. He contributed 8 goals in 33 league appearances as Braunschweig won the 1966–67 Bundesliga.

Saborowski returned to Holstein Kiel in 1971, ending his professional career two years later. From 1973, the brought his career to a close at TSV Siems.

== Death ==
After his retirement from professional football, Saborowski lived in Lübeck.

He died on 11 September 2026, at the age of 83.

== Honours ==
Eintracht Braunschweig

- Bundesliga: 1966–67

Individual

- Regionalliga Nord top scorer: 1964–65
