= Jahnstadion (Marl) =

Former multi-use stadium in Marl, Germany

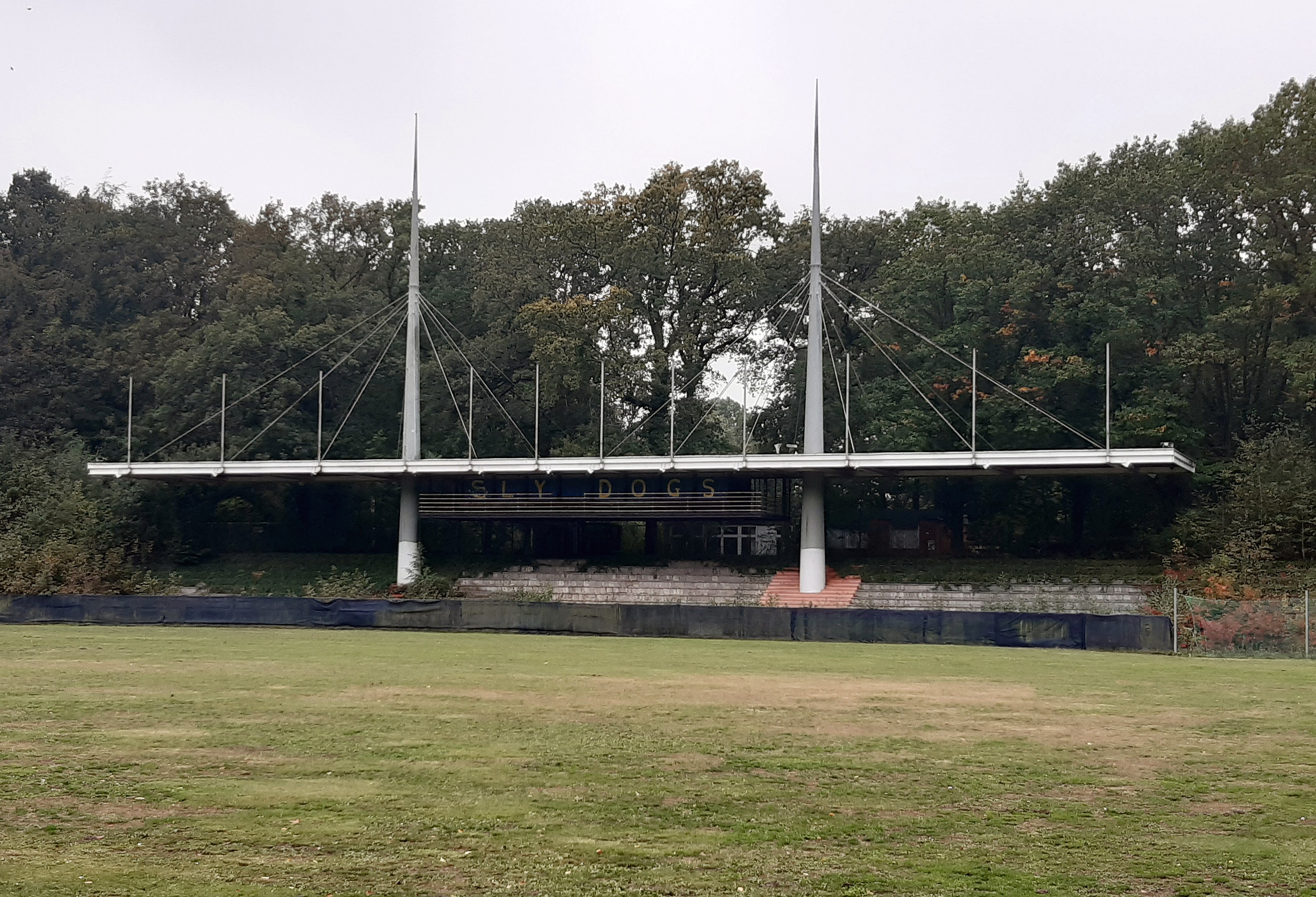
- Jahnstadion Marl-Hüls
- Interactive map of Jahnstadion
- Full name: Jahnstadion
- Location: Marl, Germany
- Coordinates: 51°39′39″N 7°08′11″E
- Capacity: 25,000 (current); 35,000 (original)
- Surface: Natural grass

Construction
- Opened: 1927
- Expanded: 1948, 1949, 1962

Tenants
- Marl Sly Dogs; TSV Marl-Hüls (until 2005)

Jahnstadion is a former multi-use stadium in Marl, Germany. It was used as the stadium of TSV Marl-Hüls association football matches. The capacity of the stadium is 25,000 spectators, although originally it was intended to hold 35,000.

It has been used exclusively for baseball since 2008. The former main grandstand is now adjacent to left field, with home plate situated near the former opposite grandstand and the farthest point from home plate in fair territory being in right center field.

== History ==
In 1924, the construction of the stadium with earth wall stands began, which was completed in 1927. After the Second World War, the stadium or clubhouse was used, among other things, for the distribution of ration cards. In 1948 and 1949, the stadium was expanded again. In 1960, a record attendance of 18,000 people was reached at the football match between TSV Marl-Hüls and Wuppertaler SV (4–1).

On February 5, 1962, the city council decided that the Jahnstadion should get a new covered main stand. Just under six weeks ago, on March 23, an architect was commissioned to develop the project. On June 25, the first stone was laid; Planning and construction management was carried out by the nationally known construction company Aribert Riege. A remarkable example of modern stadium architecture are the cabins hanging under the grandstand roof for the television and radio broadcasts of the games and for the stadium announcer.

From 14 to 16 August 1964, an international A-youth tournament was held in the Jahnstadion. Twelve days earlier, on 2 August, the stadium was officially opened and handed over. The tournament was announced at the opening of the stadium by the club's executive committee and the then sponsor Zeche Auguste Victoria (mining company). The well-known German goalkeeper Bert Trautmann from Manchester City was won over as patron. Guests of honour included Eusébio and Lev Ivanovich Yashin, who also presented the winner's trophy. Real Madrid, Red Star Belgrade, Steaua Bucharest, Inter Milan, Manchester City, Sporting Lisbon, Sparta Prague and the A-youth of TSV Marl-Hüls took part in this tournament, among others. TSV itself made it to the quarterfinals, where they lost to Red Star Belgrade. Real Madrid and Red Star Belgrade contested the final, which the Madrid team won 4–1.

On September 2, 1984, the Marl Pop Festival took place in the Jahnstadion, the headliner was the band The Cure.

Since August 24, 2008, the Marl Sly Dogs baseball team has been playing in the Jahnstadion. The club, founded in 1995, plays in the third-tier regional league of the German Baseball and Softball Association and was previously based in Marl-Polsum. TSV Marl-Hüls, whose stadium was the venue for decades, moved to the Im Loekamp sports facility in 2005.

On 31 July 2017, the city of Marl terminated the Marl Sly Dogs pro forma for the use of the stadium. The roof construction of the grandstand was assessed as dilapidated a few years ago. However, the city of Marl no longer provided funds for the preservation of the stadium, as the Jahnstadion was to be demolished and new apartments were to be built on the grounds of the stadium and part of the surrounding forest. The implementation of the plan failed, among other things, because the backfilling of the stadium oval is too expensive. At the 21st meeting of the Committee for Schools and Sports on 21 June 2017, it was decided that the baseball club can still use the Jahnstadion until 31 August 2018; after that, the club was to move to the nearby Gerhard Jüttner Stadium in Marl-Drewer. On 29 June 2017, the urban planning committee and on 4 July the main and finance committee of the city of Marl followed this decision. On 6 July, the council of the city of Marl was the last to agree. To this day (as of 2025), the stadium is still used by the Sly Dogs.

The Werkbund initiated an appeal for the Jahnstadion to be entered in the list of monuments. On May 17, 2022, the Landschaftsverband Westfalen-Lippe (LWL) submitted an application for the Jahnstadion to be included in the list of monuments to the Lower Monument Protection Authority of the City of Marl. Since then, the stadium has been a listed building. On September 1, 2022, the city council of Marl met and decided by a broad majority (29 council members) to preserve the Jahnstadion, the Jahnwald and the Waldschule.
