= Reinhold Zech =

German footballer

Personal information
- Date of birth: 27 May 1948 (age 78)
- Position: Defender

Youth career
- –1963: SV Rot
- 1963–1968: VfB Stuttgart

Senior career*
Years	Team	Apps	(Gls)
1968–1975	VfB Stuttgart	197	(4)
1975–1979	1. FC Saarbrücken	97	(1)

International career
1970	West Germany U-23	1	(0)
- * Club domestic league appearances and goals

Reinhold Zech (born 27 May 1948) is a retired German football player. He spent 9 seasons in the Bundesliga with VfB Stuttgart and 1. FC Saarbrücken. The best result he achieved was 5th place.
