= Josef Thelen =

German footballer (1941–2007)

- Thelen in the 1969–70 season

Personal information
- Full name: Josef Thelen
- Date of birth: 25 February 1941
- Place of birth: Aachen, Cologne-Aachen, Germany
- Date of death: 3 June 2007 (aged 66)
- Height: 1.82 m (6 ft 0 in)
- Position: Defender

Senior career*
Years	Team	Apps	(Gls)
1959–1963	Eschweiler SG	88	
1963–1970	Alemannia Aachen	88	(1)
- * Club domestic league appearances and goals

Josef Thelen (25 February 1941 – 3 June 2007) was a German footballer. Sometimes nicknamed "Jupp", he played as a defender for Eschweiler SG and Alemannia Aachen throughout the 1960s and early 1970s, overseeing the latter's promotion and relegation from the Bundesliga as well as playing in the 1965 DFB-Pokal final against Borussia Dortmund.

== Career ==
The defender began his career at the amateur club Eschweiler SG in the third tier Verbandsliga until 1963 as Jupp Thelen moved to Alemannia Aachen in the Regionalliga West. He was known being a man without nerves, often adapting from his earlier mistakes within subsequent matches such as his improvements in his formation with teammate Christoph Walter. With Alemannia Aachen, he was in the 1965 DFB-Pokal final against Borussia Dortmund and reached the semi-finals against Hamburger SV in the 1966–67 DFB-Pokal. During the 1966–67 Regionalliga, Thelen was a part of the squad won the championship with Aachen and they finished first in the promotion round for the 1967–68 Bundesliga. The defender made his debut in the Bundesliga on Matchday 4 in a 1–0 win against Borussia Neunkirchen. During the 1968–69 season, he was runner-up in the German championship with Alemannia Aachen behind Bayern Munich. A year later, however, the club would be relegated from the Bundesliga and Thelen ended his contractual career. He played a total of 88 Bundesliga games with one goal and 88 games in the Regionalliga West.

Thelen was mentioned in the club's fan anthem Drei Atömchen alongside Gerd Prokop, Michel Pfeiffer and Werner Nievelstein.
