= 1968–69 Bundesliga =

6th season of the Bundesliga

Bundesliga
- Season: 1968–69
- Dates: 17 August 1968 – 7 June 1969
- Champions: Bayern Munich; 1st Bundesliga title 2nd German title
- Relegated: 1. FC Nürnberg; Kickers Offenbach
- European Cup: FC Bayern Munich
- Cup Winners' Cup: FC Schalke 04 (losing DFB Cup finalists to Bayern)
- Goals: 873
- Average goals/game: 2.85
- Top goalscorer: Gerd Müller (30)
- Biggest home win: FC Bayern 6–0 Werder Bremen (29 March 1969)
- Biggest away win: 1860 Munich 0–4 M'gladbach (28 September 1968)
- Highest scoring: Werder Bremen 6–5 M'gladbach (11 goals) (7 June 1969)

The 1968–69 Bundesliga was the sixth season of the Bundesliga, West Germany's premier football league. It began on 17 August 1968 and ended on 7 June 1969. 1. FC Nürnberg were the defending champions.

== Competition modus ==
Every team played two games against each other team, one at home and one away. Teams received two points for a win and one point for a draw. If two or more teams were tied on points, places were determined by goal average. The team with the most points were crowned champions while the two teams with the fewest points were relegated to their respective Regionalliga divisions.

== Team changes to 1967–68 ==
Borussia Neunkirchen and Karlsruher SC were relegated to the Regionalliga after finishing in the last two places. They were replaced by Hertha BSC Berlin and Kickers Offenbach, who won their respective promotion play-off groups.

== Season overview ==
The dominant team of the 1968–69 season was FC Bayern Munich. Bayern were in first place of the standings from the very first matchday and never looked back, continuously increasing their margin to eventually eight points, the biggest so far in league history. They were victorious in the DFB Cup as well, beating Schalke in the final by a 2–1 score. Keys to their double win were their improved defense and top scorer Gerd Müller, who scored 30 goals.

Behind Bayern, the league continued to create surprises. Alemannia Aachen ended up in second place after a campaign which featured almost every position between second and 16th. Other notable astonishments were Eintracht Braunschweig, who finished in fourth place, and 1. FC Köln, who ended their season in a dismal 13th position.

Köln even were in danger of being relegated prior to the last matchday, sitting in 15th place with 30 points at that time. They played 1. FC Nürnberg at home, who also were in relegation trouble as 16th-placed team, one point behind Köln. Another match on that day was the clash between 17th-placed Borussia Dortmund and 18th-placed Kickers Offenbach. Both teams had 28 points prior to the game. After the matches were over, both Nürnberg and Offenbach had received 3–0 defeats, resulting in the demotion of both teams.

The demotion of Nürnberg was especially tragic as they had been Bundesliga champions only 12 months ago. Nevertheless, a pre-season sell-out of their best players and continuous quarrels between coach Max Merkel and his players proved to be costly, and although Merkel was sacked in late March 1969, it was too late to reverse tides. A home draw to Dortmund on matchday 33 and the defeat against Köln one week later eventually sealed their fate.

== Team overview ==
Location of teams in Bundesliga 1968–69

| Club | Ground | Capacity |
|---|---|---|
| Alemannia Aachen | Tivoli | 30,000 |
| Hertha BSC | Olympiastadion | 100,000 |
| Eintracht Braunschweig | Eintracht-Stadion | 38,000 |
| SV Werder Bremen | Weserstadion | 32,000 |
| Borussia Dortmund | Stadion Rote Erde | 30,000 |
| MSV Duisburg | Wedaustadion | 38,500 |
| Eintracht Frankfurt | Waldstadion | 87,000 |
| Hamburger SV | Volksparkstadion | 80,000 |
| Hannover 96 | Niedersachsenstadion | 86,000 |
| 1. FC Kaiserslautern | Stadion Betzenberg | 42,000 |
| 1. FC Köln | Müngersdorfer Stadion | 76,000 |
| Borussia Mönchengladbach | Bökelbergstadion | 34,500 |
| TSV 1860 Munich | Stadion an der Grünwalder Straße | 44,300 |
| FC Bayern Munich | Stadion an der Grünwalder Straße | 44,300 |
| 1. FC Nürnberg | Städtisches Stadion | 64,238 |
| Kickers Offenbach | Bieberer Berg | 30,000 |
| FC Schalke 04 | Glückauf-Kampfbahn | 35,000 |
| VfB Stuttgart | Neckarstadion | 53,000 |

== League table ==
| Pos | Team | Pld | W | D | L | GF | GA | GR | Pts | Qualification or relegation |
|---|---|---|---|---|---|---|---|---|---|---|
| 1 | Bayern Munich (C) | 34 | 18 | 10 | 6 | 61 | 31 | 1.968 | 46 | Qualification to European Cup first round |
| 2 | Alemannia Aachen | 34 | 16 | 6 | 12 | 57 | 51 | 1.118 | 38 | |
| 3 | Borussia Mönchengladbach | 34 | 13 | 11 | 10 | 61 | 46 | 1.326 | 37 | |
| 4 | Eintracht Braunschweig | 34 | 13 | 11 | 10 | 46 | 43 | 1.070 | 37 | |
| 5 | VfB Stuttgart | 34 | 14 | 8 | 12 | 60 | 54 | 1.111 | 36 | Qualification to Inter-Cities Fairs Cup first round |
| 6 | Hamburger SV | 34 | 13 | 10 | 11 | 55 | 55 | 1.000 | 36 | Qualification to Inter-Cities Fairs Cup first round |
| 7 | Schalke 04 | 34 | 14 | 7 | 13 | 45 | 40 | 1.125 | 35 | Qualification to Cup Winners' Cup first round (Note: As Bayern Munich also won the 1968–69 DFB-Pokal, runners-up Schalke 04 were given the European spot reserved for the domestic cup winners.) |
| 8 | Eintracht Frankfurt | 34 | 13 | 8 | 13 | 46 | 43 | 1.070 | 34 | |
| 9 | Werder Bremen | 34 | 14 | 6 | 14 | 59 | 59 | 1.000 | 34 | |
| 10 | 1860 Munich | 34 | 15 | 4 | 15 | 44 | 59 | 0.746 | 34 | Qualification to Inter-Cities Fairs Cup first round |
| 11 | Hannover 96 | 34 | 9 | 14 | 11 | 47 | 45 | 1.044 | 32 | Qualification to Inter-Cities Fairs Cup first round |
| 12 | MSV Duisburg | 34 | 8 | 16 | 10 | 33 | 37 | 0.892 | 32 | |
| 13 | 1. FC Köln | 34 | 13 | 6 | 15 | 47 | 56 | 0.839 | 32 | |
| 14 | Hertha BSC | 34 | 12 | 8 | 14 | 31 | 39 | 0.795 | 32 | Qualification to Inter-Cities Fairs Cup first round |
| 15 | 1. FC Kaiserslautern | 34 | 12 | 6 | 16 | 45 | 47 | 0.957 | 30 | |
| 16 | Borussia Dortmund | 34 | 11 | 8 | 15 | 49 | 54 | 0.907 | 30 | |
| 17 | 1. FC Nürnberg (R) | 34 | 9 | 11 | 14 | 45 | 55 | 0.818 | 29 | Relegation to Regionalliga |
| 18 | Kickers Offenbach (R) | 34 | 10 | 8 | 16 | 42 | 59 | 0.712 | 28 | Relegation to Regionalliga |

Source: www.dfb.de
Rules for classification: 1) points; 2) goal ratio.
(C) Champions; (R) Relegated

== Results ==
| Home \ Away | AAC | BSC | EBS | SVW | BVB | DUI | SGE | HSV | H96 | FCK | KOE | BMG | M60 | FCB | FCN | KOF | S04 | VFB |
|---|---|---|---|---|---|---|---|---|---|---|---|---|---|---|---|---|---|---|
| Alemannia Aachen | — | 0–0 | 1–4 | 2–1 | 0–1 | 4–0 | 4–2 | 2–0 | 2–0 | 1–0 | 2–1 | 2–1 | 4–0 | 2–4 | 4–2 | 1–2 | 4–1 | 1–3 |
| Hertha BSC | 0–1 | — | 0–0 | 1–0 | 0–0 | 1–1 | 2–0 | 3–2 | 2–1 | 1–0 | 2–1 | 2–1 | 1–2 | 1–2 | 2–0 | 1–0 | 1–0 | 0–1 |
| Eintracht Braunschweig | 2–0 | 3–3 | — | 0–3 | 4–3 | 0–0 | 1–0 | 1–0 | 3–3 | 3–0 | 2–1 | 0–0 | 2–1 | 2–3 | 0–2 | 2–2 | 3–0 | 1–2 |
| Werder Bremen | 1–2 | 2–0 | 2–1 | — | 2–1 | 2–1 | 0–1 | 1–1 | 3–2 | 2–1 | 3–1 | 6–5 | 4–1 | 1–0 | 3–3 | 2–0 | 1–3 | 1–0 |
| Borussia Dortmund | 3–1 | 2–2 | 2–1 | 3–2 | — | 2–1 | 0–1 | 3–1 | 1–1 | 2–3 | 1–1 | 1–3 | 2–0 | 0–1 | 3–1 | 3–0 | 0–1 | 1–0 |
| MSV Duisburg | 1–1 | 2–1 | 1–1 | 2–0 | 2–0 | — | 1–1 | 0–0 | 0–0 | 0–0 | 0–0 | 1–1 | 3–4 | 0–0 | 1–0 | 2–1 | 1–0 | 2–0 |
| Eintracht Frankfurt | 0–1 | 2–0 | 0–1 | 2–1 | 1–1 | 2–1 | — | 2–2 | 0–0 | 2–2 | 1–2 | 1–1 | 3–0 | 1–1 | 3–0 | 3–2 | 1–0 | 3–0 |
| Hamburger SV | 3–0 | 0–0 | 0–0 | 5–2 | 2–0 | 1–2 | 1–4 | — | 1–4 | 3–1 | 3–1 | 2–0 | 2–0 | 2–2 | 4–2 | 3–0 | 1–3 | 2–1 |
| Hannover 96 | 5–2 | 1–1 | 1–1 | 1–0 | 1–1 | 1–1 | 1–2 | 2–2 | — | 0–2 | 3–0 | 2–3 | 3–2 | 1–0 | 2–2 | 2–2 | 1–0 | 1–0 |
| 1. FC Kaiserslautern | 2–1 | 1–0 | 4–0 | 1–0 | 1–2 | 3–0 | 2–2 | 0–1 | 0–0 | — | 4–0 | 2–0 | 3–1 | 3–1 | 1–1 | 2–1 | 1–1 | 1–3 |
| 1. FC Köln | 1–2 | 1–0 | 2–0 | 3–3 | 2–1 | 1–1 | 2–1 | 4–1 | 1–0 | 2–1 | — | 1–4 | 0–0 | 1–1 | 3–0 | 2–1 | 2–0 | 5–2 |
| Borussia Mönchengladbach | 2–2 | 0–1 | 1–1 | 1–1 | 1–0 | 1–0 | 2–3 | 1–2 | 3–2 | 4–0 | 2–1 | — | 3–0 | 1–1 | 1–1 | 4–1 | 3–0 | 4–4 |
| 1860 Munich | 0–0 | 0–1 | 0–1 | 4–3 | 2–1 | 2–1 | 1–0 | 3–3 | 2–1 | 1–0 | 2–1 | 0–4 | — | 0–3 | 2–0 | 2–0 | 3–1 | 3–1 |
| Bayern Munich | 1–1 | 3–0 | 2–1 | 6–0 | 4–1 | 2–2 | 2–0 | 5–1 | 2–1 | 2–0 | 1–0 | 0–0 | 0–2 | — | 3–0 | 5–1 | 0–0 | 2–0 |
| 1. FC Nürnberg | 1–4 | 3–0 | 2–0 | 1–1 | 2–2 | 1–1 | 1–0 | 0–0 | 1–2 | 1–0 | 0–1 | 4–0 | 3–0 | 2–0 | — | 2–2 | 1–1 | 1–1 |
| Kickers Offenbach | 1–1 | 1–0 | 0–1 | 0–3 | 4–3 | 0–0 | 4–2 | 1–1 | 1–1 | 4–1 | 3–1 | 1–0 | 2–3 | 0–0 | 2–1 | — | 1–0 | 2–1 |
| Schalke 04 | 3–1 | 2–0 | 0–2 | 2–1 | 4–1 | 1–0 | 2–0 | 2–3 | 1–1 | 1–0 | 3–1 | 1–1 | 2–0 | 1–2 | 4–1 | 3–0 | — | 1–1 |
| VfB Stuttgart | 3–1 | 4–2 | 2–2 | 2–2 | 2–2 | 3–2 | 2–0 | 3–0 | 1–0 | 4–3 | 6–1 | 0–3 | 1–1 | 3–0 | 2–3 | 1–0 | 1–1 | — |

Source: DFB
Legend: Blue = home team win; Yellow = draw; Red = away team win.

== Top goalscorers ==
30 goals

- (Germany) Gerd Müller (FC Bayern Munich)

23 goals

- (Germany) Uwe Seeler (Hamburger SV)

17 goals

- (Socialist Federal Republic of Yugoslavia) Josip Skoblar (Hannover 96)

15 goals

- (Germany) Werner Görts (SV Werder Bremen)
- (Germany) Herbert Laumen (Borussia Mönchengladbach)
- (Germany) Hartmut Weiß (Eintracht Braunschweig)

14 goals

- (Germany) Carl-Heinz Rühl (1. FC Köln)

13 goals

- (Germany) Bernd Rupp (SV Werder Bremen)

12 goals

- (Germany) Lothar Emmerich (Borussia Dortmund)
- (Germany) Heinz-Dieter Hasebrink (1. FC Kaiserslautern)
- (Germany) Heinz-Gerd Klostermann (Alemannia Aachen)

== Champion squad ==
FC Bayern Munich
Goalkeeper: Sepp Maier (34).

Defenders: Werner Olk (34 / 1); Peter Pumm (Austria) (34); Hans-Georg Schwarzenbeck (34); Franz Beckenbauer (33 / 2); Peter Kupferschmidt (22).
Midfielders: August Starek (Austria) (34 / 4); Franz Roth (34 / 2); Helmut Schmidt (21 / 2).
Forwards: Rainer Ohlhauser (34 / 10); Dieter Brenninger (34 / 9); Gerd Müller (30 / 30); Gustav Jung (4).
(league appearances and goals listed in brackets)

Manager: Branko Zebec (Socialist Federal Republic of Yugoslavia) .

On the roster but have not played in a league game: Fritz Kosar; Benno Zellermayer; Peter Stegmann; Albrecht Wachsmann; Reinhard Lippert.

== Attendances ==
| No. | Team | Attendance | Change | Highest |
|---|---|---|---|---|
| 1 | Hertha BSC | 44,176 | 925.8% | 70,000 |
| 2 | 1. FC Nürnberg | 26,647 | -33.0% | 50,000 |
| 3 | Bayern München | 25,029 | 15.3% | 40,000 |
| 4 | 1. FC Köln | 24,882 | 7.4% | 53,000 |
| 5 | Schalke 04 | 23,412 | 2.8% | 40,000 |
| 6 | Borussia Dortmund | 22,824 | 4.3% | 38,000 |
| 7 | Hannover 96 | 22,706 | 1.5% | 40,000 |
| 8 | OFC Kickers | 22,353 | 151.7% | 33,000 |
| 9 | Hamburger SV | 21,059 | 9.3% | 50,000 |
| 10 | Eintracht Frankfurt | 20,765 | 2.5% | 60,000 |
| 11 | Borussia Mönchengladbach | 20,500 | -6.9% | 32,000 |
| 12 | VfB Stuttgart | 20,482 | -14.6% | 74,700 |
| 13 | Alemannia | 19,059 | -16.3% | 30,000 |
| 14 | Werder Bremen | 18,412 | -11.6% | 35,000 |
| 15 | MSV Duisburg | 17,324 | 3.9% | 37,000 |
| 16 | Eintracht Braunschweig | 15,882 | 1.5% | 38,000 |
| 17 | TSV 1860 | 14,824 | -23.3% | 44,000 |
| 18 | 1. FC Kaiserslautern | 14,176 | 4.8% | 25,000 |

== See also ==
- 1968–69 DFB-Pokal
