= Westwacht Aachen =

German football club

- Full name: Turn- und Sportverein Deutsche Jungendkraft Westwacht 08 Aachen e.V.
- Founded: 1908 – Jünglingverein Sankt Jakob Aachen since 1920 – DJK Westwacht 08 Aachen
- Ground: Stadion West Neuenhofer Weg 4, 52074 Aachen; Kunstrasenplatz Vaalser Straße 292, 52074 Aachen
- League: Kreisliga (VIII)
- 2015–16: Bezirksliga Mittelrhein (VII), 16th ↓
Home colours	Away colours

Westwacht Aachen is a German football club from the city of Aachen, North Rhine-Westphalia. The footballers played as a fourth division side in the late 1970s and currently compete in the sixth tier Landesliga. They are part of a sports club with over 800 members that also has departments for swimming, fitness, and frisbee.

== History ==
Established in 1908 as Jünglingverein Sankt Jakob Aachen, the club adopted its current name in 1920. As part of the Catholic-sponsored Deutscher Jungendkraft Sportverband (commonly DJK, en:German Youth Sport Association) the club was – like other clubs with religious affiliations or worker's clubs – ordered disbanded by the Nazis in 1935 as politically undesirable. It was re-established in the late 1940s.

The team enjoyed its greatest success in the late 1970s, breaking into the Amateurliga Mittelrhein in 1974. Aachen was only able to earn lower table finishes there and after a 17th-place result in what had become the Amateuroberliga Nordrhein (IV) in 1978–79 returned to lower-tier competition. After an unsuccessful Verbandsliga (V) campaign in 2007–08 Westwacht slipped to the Landesliga (VII). It fell down to the Bezirksliga (VIII) by 2011 but returned to the Landesliga Mittelrhein. A difficult 2014–15 season, where it lost 25 of its 30-season games and recorded just one win saw the club finish last in the Landesliga and being relegated to the Bezirksliga. The following season proofed equally as challenging with the club accumulating just six points, finishing last and being relegated, now to the Kreisliga.

== Honours ==
The club's honours:

- Landesliga Mittelrhein
  - Champions: 1974, 1990, 2005
