= Werner Scholz (footballer) =

German footballer (born 1944)

Personal information
- Date of birth: 1 December 1944 (age 81)
- Place of birth: Duisburg-Hamborn, Germany
- Height: 1.77 m (5 ft 10 in)
- Position: Goalkeeper

Youth career
- –1957: SV Alstaden
- 1957–1963: SF Hamborn 07

Senior career*
Years	Team	Apps	(Gls)
1963–1968	SF Hamborn 07	103	(0)
1968–1972	Alemannia Aachen	109	(0)
1972–1981	VfL Bochum	207	(0)
1981–1982	Rot-Weiss Essen	16	(0)
- Concordia Bochum
- Vorwärts Werne
1986–1988	VfL Bochum II		
- * Club domestic league appearances and goals

Werner Scholz (born 1 December 1944) is a German retired professional footballer who played as a goalkeeper.

== Career statistics ==
Club performance			League		Cup		Total	
Season	Club	League	Apps	Goals	Apps	Goals	Apps	Goals
Germany			League		DFB-Pokal		Total	
1963–64	SF Hamborn 07	Regionalliga West			—			
1964–65	SF Hamborn 07	Regionalliga West			—			
1965–66	SF Hamborn 07	Regionalliga West			—			
1966–67	SF Hamborn 07	Regionalliga West			—			
1967–68	SF Hamborn 07	Regionalliga West			—			
1968–69	Alemannia Aachen	Bundesliga	30	0	3	0	33	0
1969–70	Alemannia Aachen	Bundesliga	15	0	5	0	20	0
1970–71	Alemannia Aachen	Regionalliga West	34	0	—		34	0
1971–72	Alemannia Aachen	Regionalliga West	30	0	—		30	0
1972–73	VfL Bochum	Bundesliga	28	0	4	0	32	0
1973–74	VfL Bochum	Bundesliga	33	0	2	0	35	0
1974–75	VfL Bochum	Bundesliga	33	0	4	0	37	0
1975–76	VfL Bochum	Bundesliga	34	0	4	0	38	0
1976–77	VfL Bochum	Bundesliga	33	0	3	0	26	0
1977–78	VfL Bochum	Bundesliga	31	0	4	0	35	0
1978–79	VfL Bochum	Bundesliga	14	0	2	0	16	0
1979–80	VfL Bochum	Bundesliga	0	0	0	0	0	0
1980–81	VfL Bochum	Bundesliga	1	0	1	0	2	0
1981–82	Rot-Weiss Essen	2. Bundesliga	16	0	0	0	16	0
Total	Germany				32	0		
Career total					32	0		
