= Herbert Gronen =

German footballer (1940–2009)

- Gronen in the 1969–70 season

Personal information
- Date of birth: 13 January 1944
- Place of birth: Aachen, Cologne-Aachen, Germany
- Date of death: 29 April 2023 (aged 79)
- Place of death: Aachen, North Rhine-Westphalia, Germany
- Height: 1.73 m (5 ft 8 in)
- Position: Midfielder

Youth career
- ?–1963: Borussia Brand

Senior career*
Years	Team	Apps	(Gls)
1963–1971	Alemannia Aachen	212	(29)
1971–1972	Fortuna Düsseldorf	20	(1)
1972–1973	Schwarz-Weiß Bregenz	12	(0)
1973–1976	Rapid Wien	77	(12)
- * Club domestic league appearances and goals

Herbert Gronen (13 January 1944 – 29 April 2023) was a German footballer. He played a midfielder for various clubs from the early 1960s to the mid-1970s. He notably played for Bundesliga club Alemannia Aachen and Austrian club Rapid Wien throughout his career.

== Career ==
Emerging from the youth of Borussia Brand in 1963 alongside Herbert Wimmer, Gronen was signed by the regional league club Alemannia Aachen for the 1963–64 Regionalliga. At the end of his debut season, he won the championship in the Regionalliga West with the team. In the subsequent promotion playoffs to the Bundesliga, he only finished third in Group 2 with this was also the case in the following season when his team finished the season in second place. On the other hand, he was successful in the DFB-Pokal, in which he advanced to the 1965 DFB-Pokal final with Aachen but lost 2–0 to Borussia Dortmund.

Emerging as Regionalliga champions from the 1966–67 season, he and his team finished Group 2 of the promotion round to the Bundesliga as winners at the third attempt. In his first Bundesliga season, he made his debut on 19 August 1967 in a 4–0 defeat at home to Bayern Munich as he played 32 games, scoring two goals. In the following season, he contributed to second place behind Bayern Munich in the championship with 24 games and one goal. At the end of the 1969–70 season, his 25 games, in which he scored a goal, could not prevent the club's relegation to the Regionalliga West. He would have great compatibility with his teammate and friend Hans-Jürgen Ferdinand as Gronen would often give Ferdinand many assists for opportunities to score goals with his iconic "Matthew Trick". Following another season for Alemannia Aachen, he moved to Fortuna Düsseldorf for the 1971–72 season, for whom he scored one goal in 20 games in his return to the Bundesliga.

Following this, Gronen played the first half of the 1972–73 season for the Austrian national league club Schwarz-Weiß Bregenz, which had been recently relegated. From 17 March 1973 to 31 October 1975, he played 77 games for Rapid Wien, for whom he scored twelve goals. On 27 May and 2 June 1973, he played both finals of the Austrian Cup against SSW Innsbruck, who initially won their home game 1–0. Rapid then won the second leg in Vienna following Gronen's equalizer with the final score of 2–1, but the cup victory went to Innsbruck due to the away goals rule.
