= Hans Hipp =

German footballer (1912–2001)

Personal information
- Date of birth: 10 November 1912, Wannweil
- Place of birth: Wannweil, German Empire
- Date of death: February 2001

Youth career
- -2001: Reutlingen

Senior career*
Years	Team	Apps	(Gls)
1930-1939	Reutlingen		

Managerial career
- 1950-1951: Reutlingen
- 1951-1952: Pforzheim
- 1952-1953: Karlsruhe
- 1953-1956: Augsburg
- 1956-1961: 1860 München
- 1961-1963: Augsburg
- 1963–1964: Westfalia Herne
- 1964–1966: Marl-Hüls
- 1966–1969: Arminia Hannover
- 1969–1970: Göttingen
- 1970–1971: Tasmania Berlin
- 1971–1973: Hannover 96
- 1973–1974: Freiburger FC
- 1974: Grazer AK
- 1977–1978: Konstanz
- * Club domestic league appearances and goals

Hans Hipp (10 November 1912, Wannweil – February 2001, Friedberg) was a German football manager.

== Career ==
In 1928, Hipp joined SSV Reutlingen 05. Two years later, he was promoted to the Reutlingen first team.

After the Second World War he began his managerial career at TG Gönningen. He then became a coach at TSV Eningen and SV Wannweil. In October 1950, Hipp became head coach at SSV Reutlingen and was relegated from the Oberliga Süd with SSV at the end of the 1950/51 season. In the following season, Hipp took over as manager of 1. FC Pforzheim from October 1951. From the start of the 1952/53 season, he coached VfB Mühlburg until 30 April 1953, which became Karlsruher SC on 16 October 1952.
