= Christian Breuer =

German speed skater

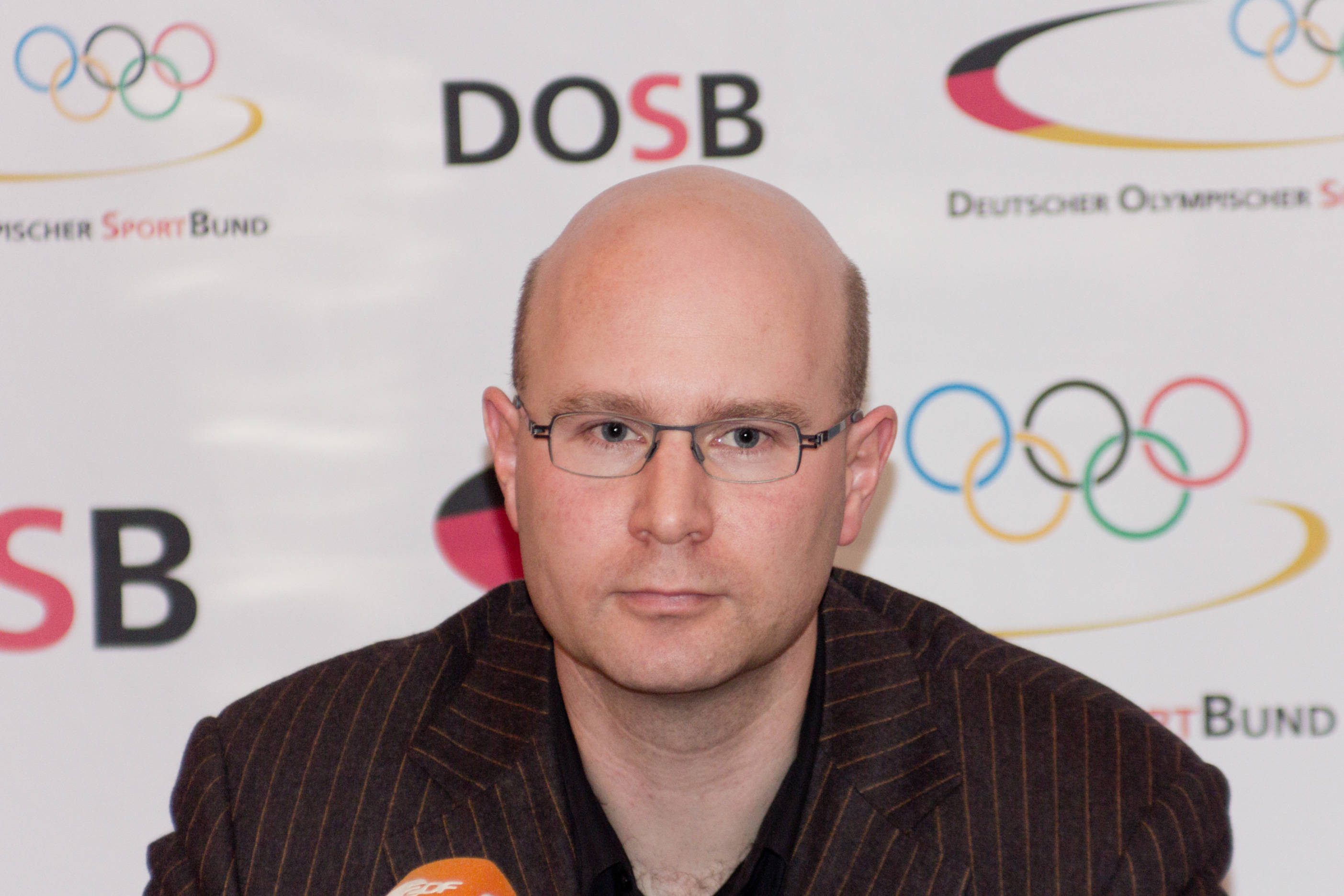
- Christian Breuer in 2012

Personal information
- Nationality: German
- Born: 3 November 1976 (age 48); Krefeld, West Germany

Sport
- Sport: Speed skating

Christian Breuer (born 3 November 1976) is a German former speed skater. He competed at the 1998 Winter Olympics and the 2002 Winter Olympics.
