= Old Tivoli =

Football stadium in Aachen, Germany

Tivoli
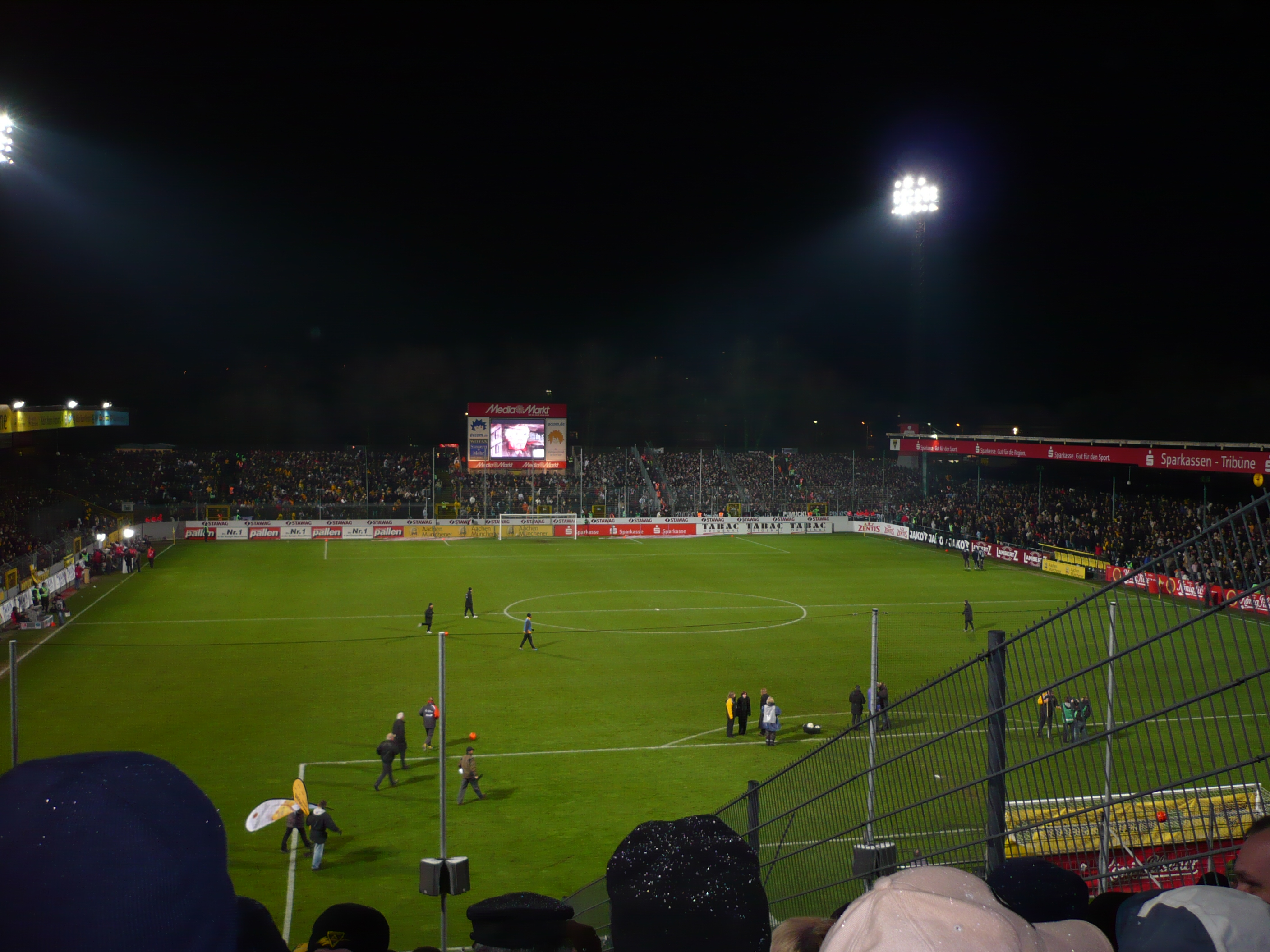
- The Tivoli in Aachen
- Interactive map of Tivoli
- Location: Aachen, Germany
- Coordinates: 50°47′36″N 6°5′50″E
- Owner: Alemannia Aachen (1928-1968); Stadt Aachen (1968-2012)
- Capacity: 21,300
- Surface: Grass

Construction
- Built: 1925–1928
- Opened: 1928
- Renovated: 1953
- Expanded: 1957 & 1980
- Closed: 2011

Tenants
- 1928-2009 Alemannia Aachen; 2009-2011 Alemannia Aachen II

The Tivoli, colloquially known as the old Tivoli, was a football stadium in Aachen, Germany. Opened in 1928, it was used by the city's largest football team, Alemannia Aachen, until the opening of the new Tivoli in 2009.

== Overview ==
In 1908, the city of Aachen leased the area of the old manor Tivoli to the club, named after the inn Gut Tivoli which was located there since the 19th century, in turn taking its name from the town of Tivoli in central Italy. The club later built a football ground there. In 1925 more land was added to the lease, and the construction of the stadium was started. Inaugurated on 3 June 1928 it had a capacity of 11,000.

After World War II Alemannia Aachen played in the Oberliga West, and the stadium became too small. In September 1953 a standing tribune was built (the Würselener Wall.) It wasn't until 1957 that seats were added to the tribune and Floodlights for nighttime events. The new stadium was inaugurated on 28 August 1957 with a game against RCD Espanyol. Additional seating areas were also later constructed.

On 17 May 2008, Alemannia Aachen began building a new stadium also named Tivoli nearby, which replaced the old stadium on 17 August 2009. The demolition of the old Tivoli, which should have begun in June 2011, was postponed, but started with a press conference on 26 September 2011. The 10,300-square metre large plot of land was later sold by the city to build single-family houses, a supermarket and office spaces.

== Gallery ==
Schema Old Tivoli

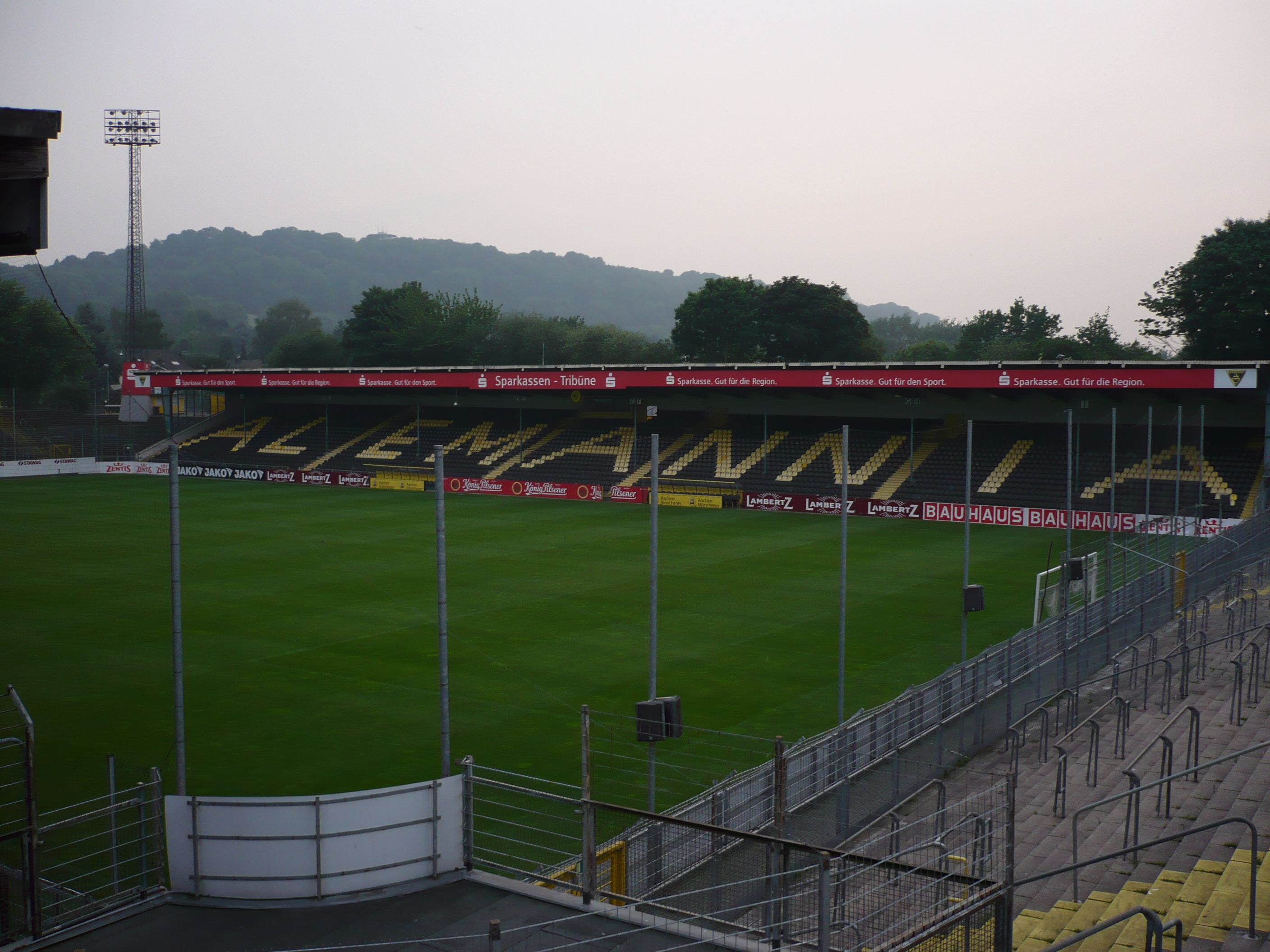
Grandstand

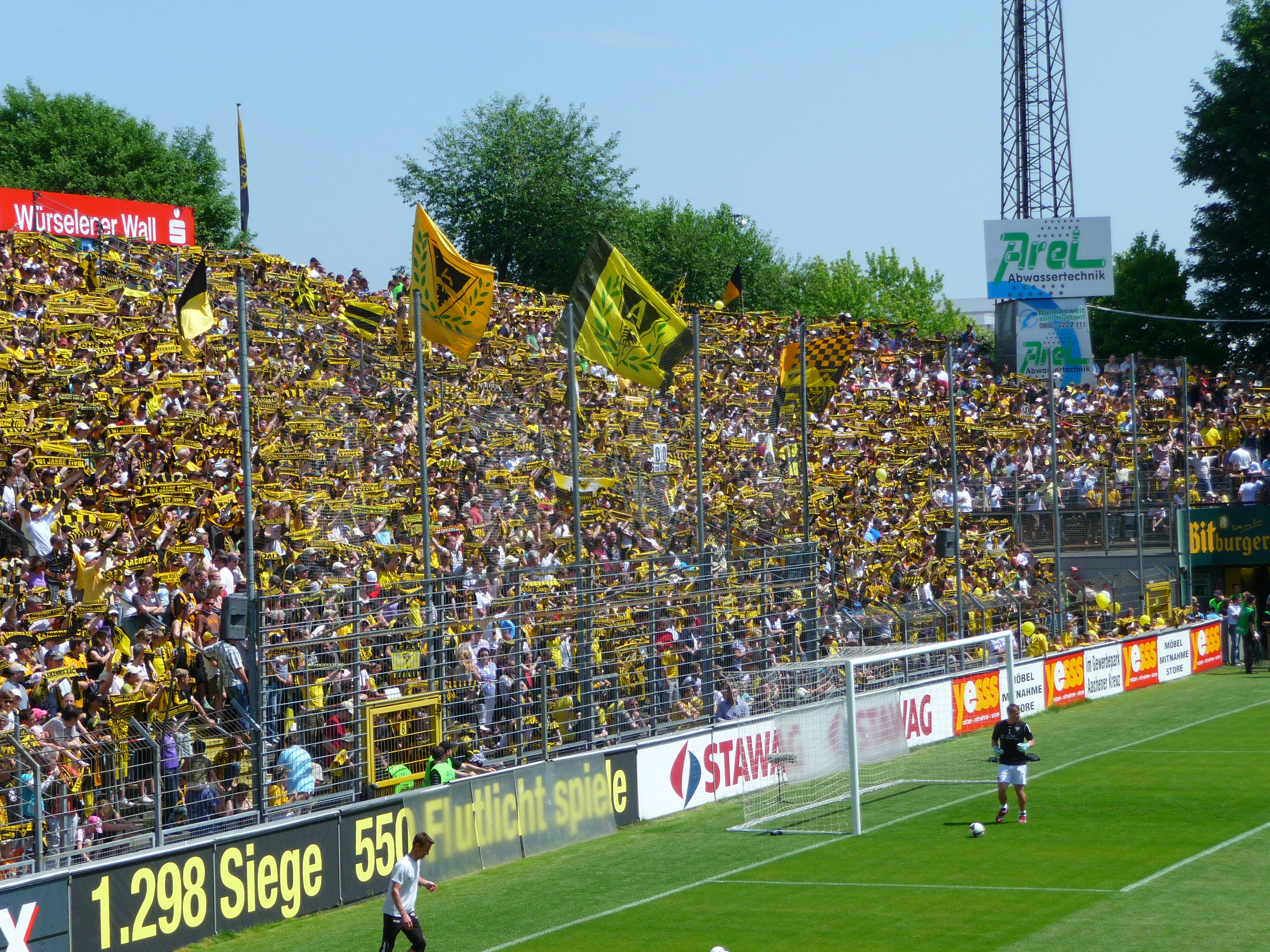
Würselener Wall (North Stand)

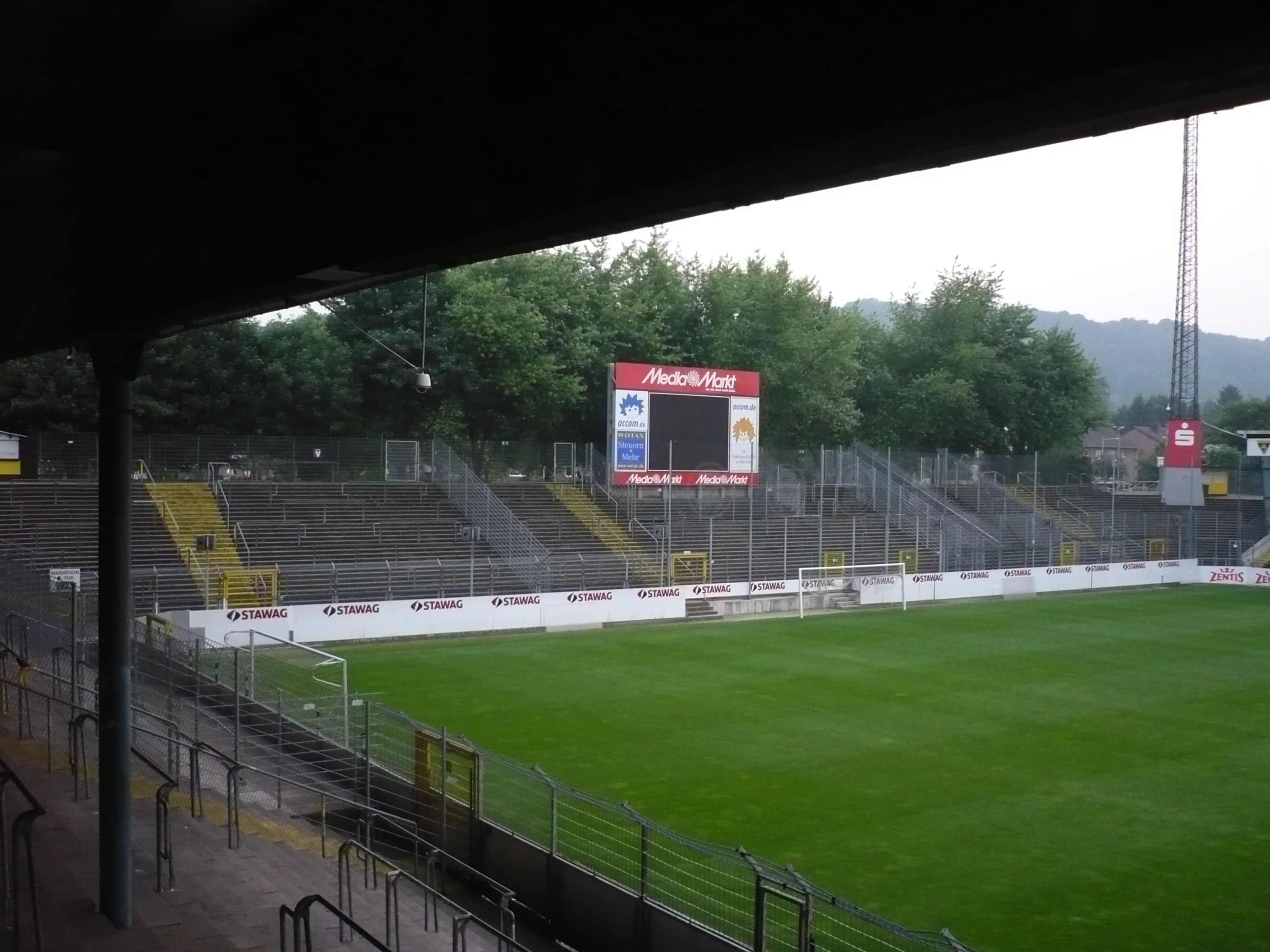
Aachen wall (South Stand)

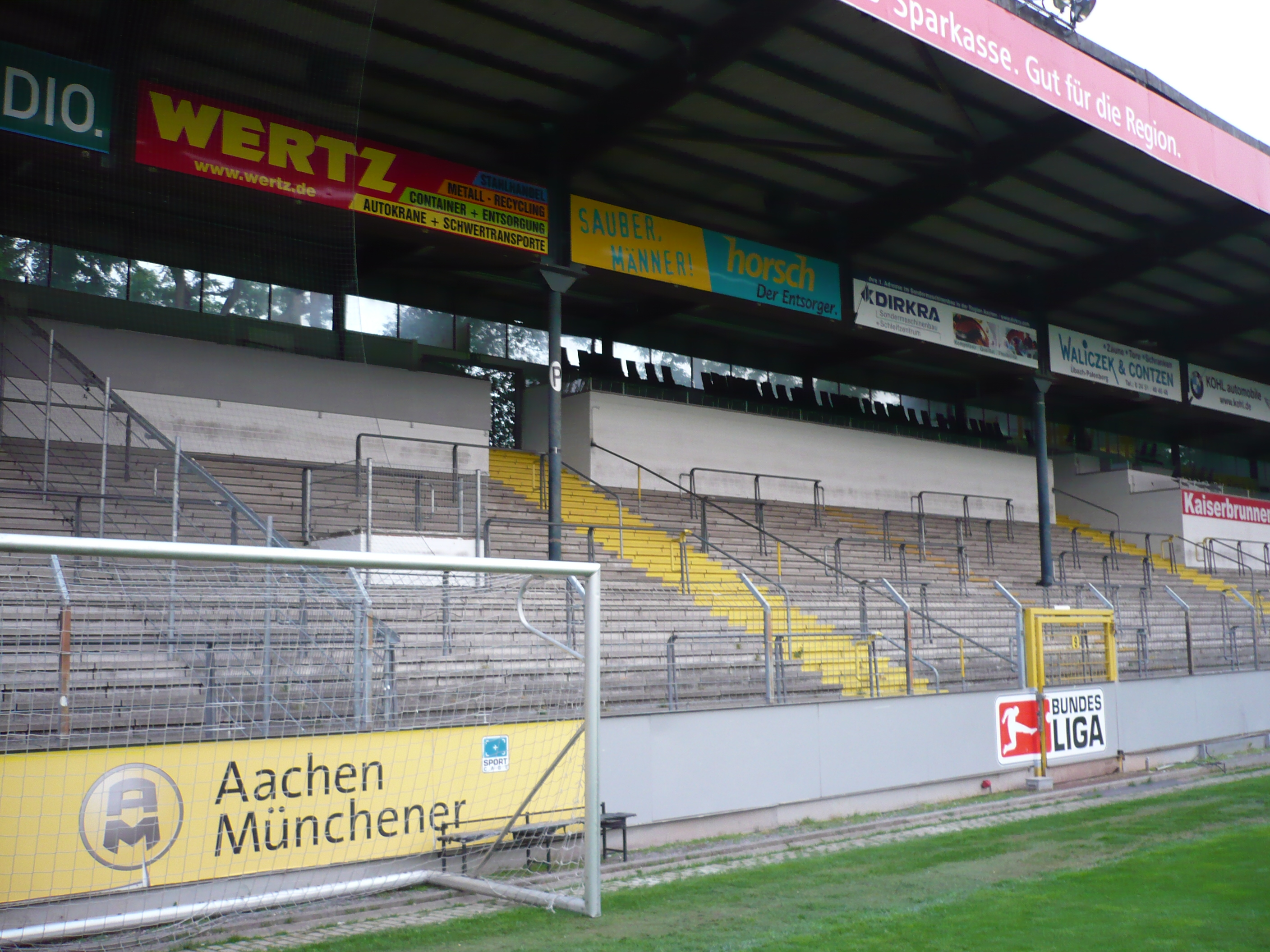
Aachen und Münchener Stand
