= Roger Claessen =

Belgian footballer (1941–1982)

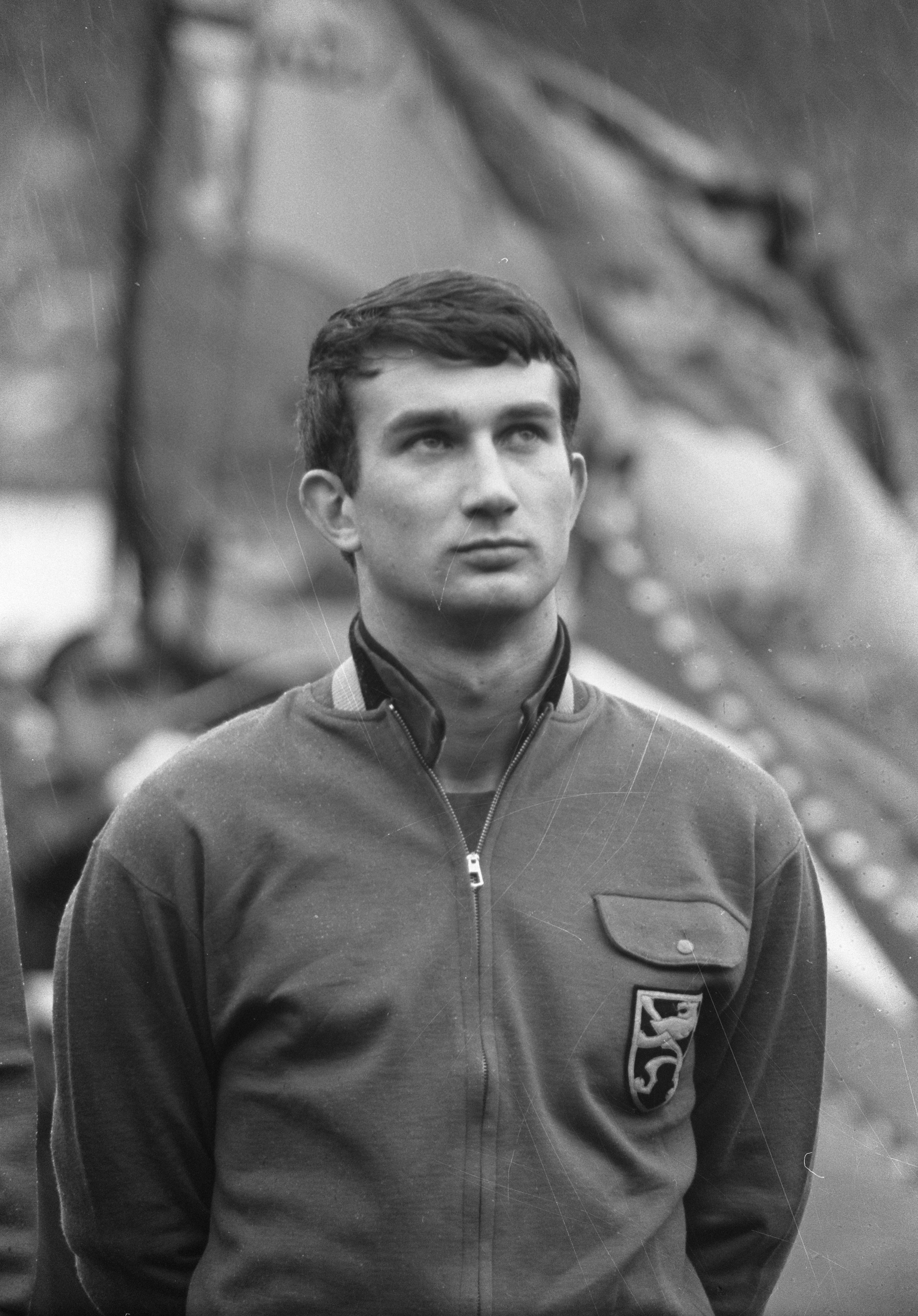
- Claessen for Belgium in 1962

Personal information
- Date of birth: 27 September 1941
- Place of birth: Warsage, Belgium
- Date of death: 3 October 1982 (aged 41)
- Place of death: Liège, Belgium
- Height: 1.81 m (5 ft 11 in)
- Position: Striker

Youth career
- 1954–1956: Etoile Dalhem
- 1956–1958: Standard Liège

Senior career*
Years	Team	Apps	(Gls)
1958–1968	Standard Liège	210	(124)
1968–1970	Alemannia Aachen	44	(11)
1970–1972	Beerschot	7	(3)
1972–1974	Crossing Schaerbeek	58	(2)
Total		319	(140)

International career
1961–1968	Belgium	17	(7)

Managerial career
- RJS Bas-Oha
- * Club domestic league appearances and goals

Roger Claessen (27 September 1941 – 3 October 1982) was a Belgian footballer who played as a forward. He finished as the top scorer of the Belgian League with 20 goals (along with Paul Van Himst) in 1968 while playing for Standard Liège. He played 17 times with the Belgium national team between 1961 and 1968, scoring seven goals. Claessen made his international debut on 20 May 1961 in a 2–1 defeat to Switzerland, and he scored.

Due to his lifestyle, he was nicknamed "Roger-La honte" (Roger-the shame). He played for other teams, like Alemannia Aachen Beerschot and Crossing Schaarbeek before retiring from football in 1974.

Claessen died aged 41.

He was voted Standard Liège player of the century by supporters.

== Honours ==
Standard Liège

- Belgian First Division: 1960–61, 1962–63
- Belgian Cup: 1965–66, 1966–67
- European Cup: 1961–62 (semi-finals)

Beerschot

- Belgian Cup: 1970–71

Individual

- Belgian First Division top scorer: 1967-68 (20 goals)
- European Cup Winners Cup top scorer: 1966–67 (ten goals)
- DH The Best Standard Liège Team Ever: 2020
