= Gerhard Prokop =

German footballer and manager

Personal information
- Date of birth: 18 May 1939
- Place of birth: Gladbeck, Germany
- Date of death: 23 January 2002 (aged 62)
- Place of death: Germany
- Position: Goalkeeper

Senior career*
Years	Team	Apps	(Gls)
1957–1961	SV Zweckel	-	(0)
1961–1963	Sportfreunde Gladbeck	46	(0)
1963–1970	Alemannia Aachen	182	(0)
1970–1974	Eupen	119	(0)
1974–1976	Alemannia Aachen	17	(0)

Managerial career
- 1976–1978: Alemannia Aachen
- 1978–1979: Westfalia Herne
- 1979–1980: Holstein Kiel
- 1980–1981: SG Union Solingen
- 1982–1983: Apollon Athens
- 1983–1984: PAS Giannina
- 1984–1985: Apollon Athens
- 1985–1986: PAS Giannina
- 1986–1987: Apollon Athens
- 1987–1988: Aris
- 1988–1989: Doxa Drama
- 1989–1990: Apollon Kalamarias
- 1990–1991: Athinaikos
- 1992: Doxa Drama
- 1992: Ionikos
- 1993–1994: Apollon Kalamarias
- 1994–1996: Omonia
- 1996–1997: EN Paralimni
- 1997: Athinaikos
- 1997–1998: Niki Volos
- 1999: Doxa Vyronas
- * Club domestic league appearances and goals

Gerhard "Gerd" Prokop (18 May 1939 – 23 January 2002) was a German football player and manager.

He played for SV Zweckel (1957–61), Sportfreunde Gladbeck (1961–63), Alemannia Aachen (1963–70 and 1974–76) and K.A.S. Eupen (1970–74).

He managed Alemannia Aachen, Westfalia Herne, Holstein Kiel, SG Union Solingen, Apollon Athens (1982–83, 1984–85 and 1986–87), PAS Giannina (part of 1983–84, 1985–86 and 1986–87), Aris Thessaloniki (1987–88), Doxa Drama (1988–89 and 1992), Apollon Kalamarias (1989–90 and 1993–94), Athinaikos (1990–91 and 1997), Ionikos (1992), AC Omonia (1994–96), EN Paralimni (1996–97), Niki Volos (1997–98) and Doxa Vyronas (1999).
