= 1964–65 Regionalliga =

Regionalliga
- Season: 1964–65
- Champions: Holstein Kiel Tennis Borussia Berlin Borussia Mönchengladbach FC Bayern Munich: 1. FC Saarbrücken
- Promoted: Borussia Mönchengladbach FC Bayern Munich SC Tasmania 1900 Berlin
- Relegated: VfR Neumünster Rasensport Harburg Reinickendorfer Füchse Homberger SV Sportfreunde Saarbrücken VfR Kaiserslautern Germania Metternich FC Wacker München TSG Ulm 1846 FC Emmendingen

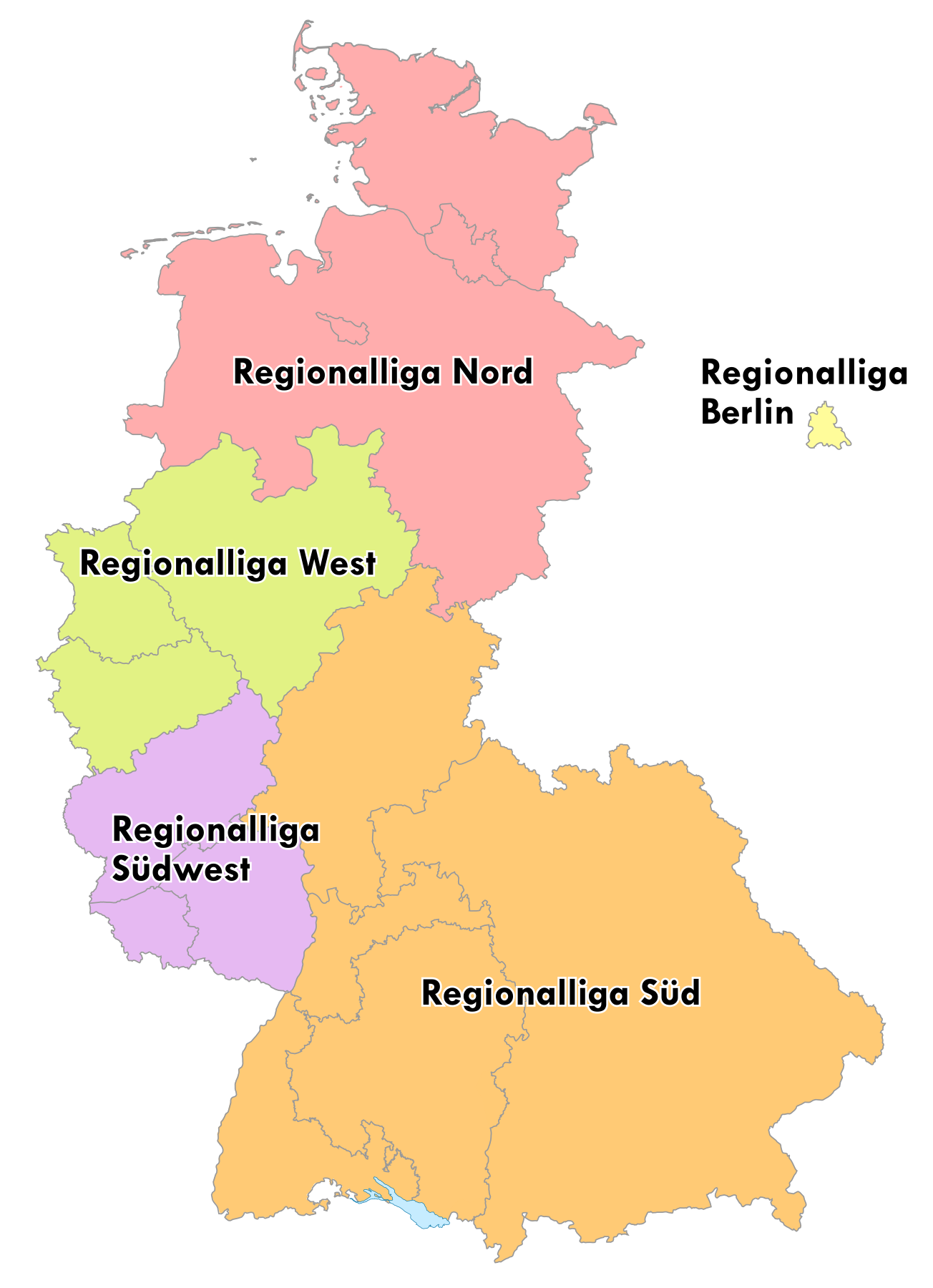
Map of the five German Regionalligas from 1963 to 1974

The 1964–65 Regionalliga was the second Regionalliga season. The league operated in five regional divisions, Berlin, North, South, Southwest and West. The five league champions and the runners-up from the west, south, southwest and north then entered a promotion play-off to determine the two clubs to move up to the Bundesliga for the next season. Western and southern champions Borussia Mönchengladbach and FC Bayern Munich were promoted. Additionally, the third placed team in Berlin, SC Tasmania 1900 Berlin, was also promoted to replace Hertha BSC, which had their Bundesliga licence revoked.

== North ==
The 1964–65 season saw two new clubs in the league, SC Göttingen 05 and Rasensport Harburg, both promoted from the Amateurliga while no club had been relegated from the Bundesliga to the league.

Pos	Team	Pld	W	D	L	GF	GA	GD	Pts	Promotion, qualification or relegation
1	Holstein Kiel	32	24	4	4	94	41	+53	52	Qualification to promotion playoffs
2	FC St. Pauli	32	17	8	7	79	45	+34	42	Qualification to promotion playoffs
3	Altona 93	32	17	7	8	69	45	+24	41	
4	Arminia Hannover	34	17	8	9	76	49	+27	42	
5	Göttingen 05	32	17	3	12	62	40	+22	37	
6	VfL Wolfsburg	32	12	8	12	53	56	−3	32	
7	TuS Bremerhaven 93	32	11	9	12	46	55	−9	31	
8	ASV Bergedorf 85	32	14	2	16	61	62	−1	30	
9	Concordia Hamburg	32	13	4	15	44	57	−13	30	
10	VfL Osnabrück	32	12	5	15	71	65	+6	29	
11	VfB Lübeck	32	11	6	15	42	56	−14	28	
12	Victoria Hamburg	32	10	8	14	52	73	−21	28	
13	VfB Oldenburg	32	10	7	15	52	59	−7	27	
14	SV Friedrichsort	32	9	9	14	41	59	−18	27	
15	VfV Hildesheim	32	9	8	15	49	60	−11	26	
16	VfR Neumünster (R)	32	11	4	17	52	71	−19	26	Relegation to Amateurliga
17	Rasensport Harburg (R)	32	6	6	20	39	89	−50	18	Relegation to Amateurliga

Source: Fussballdaten.de (in German)
Rules for classification: 1) Points;
(R) Relegated

=== Top goalscorers ===
The top goal scorers in the Regionalliga Nord:

Rank	Player	Club	Goals
1	(Germany) Gerd Saborowski	Holstein Kiel	34
2	(Germany) Gerd Koll	Holstein Kiel	24
3	(Germany) Ulrich Kallius	Altona 93	22

== Berlin ==
The 1964–65 season saw one new club in the league, Viktoria 89 Berlin, promoted from the Amateurliga Berlin, while no club had been relegated from the Bundesliga to the league. After a home-and-away round of 18 games each the league was split into a championship and a relegation round with five clubs each. Because Tennis Borussia Berlin failed in the promotion round and Spandauer SV declined SC Tasmania 1900 Berlin was directly promoted to the Bundesliga to replace Hertha BSC which had its licence revoked.

Pos	Team	Pld	W	D	L	GF	GA	GD	Pts	Promotion, qualification or relegation
1	Tennis Borussia Berlin	26	17	8	1	67	23	+44	42	Qualification to promotion playoffs
2	Spandauer SV	26	18	5	3	57	26	+31	41	
3	SC Tasmania 1900 Berlin (P)	26	18	3	5	82	29	+53	39	Promotion to Bundesliga
4	Wacker 04 Berlin	26	9	4	13	49	59	−10	22	
5	Berliner SV 92	26	8	4	14	28	61	−33	20	
6	BFC Südring	26	7	8	11	54	61	−7	22	
7	Blau-Weiß 90 Berlin	26	6	10	10	27	38	−11	22	
8	Hertha Zehlendorf	26	6	6	14	33	50	−17	18	
9	BFC Viktoria 1889	26	7	3	16	47	69	−22	17	
10	Reinickendorfer Füchse (R)	26	6	5	15	28	56	−28	17	Relegation to Amateurliga

Source: Fussballdaten.de (in German)
Rules for classification: 1) Points;
(P) Promoted; (R) Relegated

== West ==
The 1964–65 season saw three new clubs in the league, Eintracht Gelsenkirchen and Homberger SV, promoted from the Verbandsliga, while Preußen Münster had been relegated from the Bundesliga to the league.

Pos	Team	Pld	W	D	L	GF	GA	GD	Pts	Promotion, qualification or relegation
1	Borussia Mönchengladbach (P)	34	23	6	5	92	39	+53	52	Qualification to promotion play-offs
2	Alemannia Aachen	34	21	7	6	69	23	+46	49	Qualification to promotion play-offs
3	Fortuna Düsseldorf	34	18	7	9	71	38	+33	43	
4	Rot-Weiß Oberhausen	34	17	8	9	55	35	+20	42	
5	Arminia Bielefeld	34	15	9	10	68	52	+16	39	
6	Wuppertaler SV	34	14	8	12	54	52	+2	36	
7	Rot-Weiss Essen	34	14	6	14	56	53	+3	34	
8	Preußen Münster	34	13	7	14	50	48	+2	33	
9	Schwarz-Weiß Essen	34	10	13	11	58	59	−1	33	
10	Viktoria Köln	34	14	5	15	41	48	−7	33	
11	Eintracht Duisburg	34	10	12	12	41	53	−12	32	
12	Westfalia Herne	34	13	5	16	45	56	−11	31	
13	Eintracht Gelsenkirchen	34	10	10	14	46	57	−11	30	
14	Hamborn 07	34	9	11	14	49	68	−19	29	
15	TSV Marl-Hüls	34	10	8	16	36	59	−23	28	
16	Bayer 04 Leverkusen	34	8	10	16	48	55	−7	26	
17	STV Horst-Emscher	34	6	10	18	33	79	−46	22	
18	Homberger SV (R)	34	6	8	20	24	62	−38	20	Relegation to Amateurliga

Source: Fussballdaten.de (in German)
Rules for classification: 1) Points;
(P) Promoted; (R) Relegated

=== Top goalscorers ===
The top goal scorers in the Regionalliga Wset:

Rank	Player	Club	Goals
1	(Germany) Peter Meyer	Fortuna Düsseldorf	24
1	(Germany) Bernd Rupp	Borussia Mönchengladbach	24
3	(Germany) Jupp Heynckes	Borussia Mönchengladbach	23
4	(Germany) Günter Netzer	Borussia Mönchengladbach	17

== South-West ==
The 1964–65 season saw two new clubs in the league, Germania Metternich, promoted from the Amateurliga, while 1. FC Saarbrücken had been relegated from the Bundesliga to the league.

Pos	Team	Pld	W	D	L	GF	GA	GD	Pts	Promotion, qualification or relegation
1	1. FC Saarbrücken	34	27	4	3	92	33	+59	58	Qualification to promotion playoffs
2	Wormatia Worms	34	20	10	4	64	24	+40	50	Qualification to promotion playoffs
3	Eintracht Trier	34	21	6	7	67	27	+40	48	
4	Saar 05 Saarbrücken	34	20	6	8	69	33	+36	46	
5	Südwest Ludwigshafen	34	18	6	10	64	44	+20	42	
6	TuS Neuendorf	34	18	6	10	68	53	+15	42	
7	FK Pirmasens	34	19	3	12	76	44	+32	41	
8	Ludwigshafener SC	34	14	8	12	56	50	+6	36	
9	SpVgg Weisenau	34	13	6	15	56	73	−17	32	
10	Phönix Bellheim	34	10	10	14	40	51	−11	30	
11	1. FSV Mainz 05	34	12	4	18	55	64	−9	28	
12	VfR Frankenthal	34	9	9	16	54	64	−10	27	
13	BSC Oppau	34	11	5	18	53	69	−16	27	
14	Röchling Völklingen	34	10	6	18	54	71	−17	26	
15	TSC Zweibrücken	34	10	3	21	53	82	−29	23	
16	Sportfreunde Saarbrücken (R)	34	8	5	21	36	72	−36	21	Relegation to Amateurliga
17	VfR Kaiserslautern (R)	34	6	6	22	32	79	−47	18	Relegation to Amateurliga
18	Germania Metternich (R)	34	4	9	21	26	82	−56	17	Relegation to Amateurliga

Source: Fussballdaten.de (in German)
Rules for classification: 1) Points;
(R) Relegated

=== Top goalscorers ===
The top goal scorers in the Regionalliga Südwest:

Rank	Player	Club	Goals
1	(Germany) Emil Poklitar	1. FC Saarbrücken	28
2	(Germany) Hans-Erwin Volberg	FK Pirmasens	26
3	(Germany) Fritz Altmeyer	Saar 05 Saarbrücken	23

== South ==
The 1964–65 season saw three new clubs in the league, SV Darmstadt 98, promoted from the Amateurliga Hessen, FC Wacker München, promoted from the Amateurliga Bayern, and FC Emmendingen, promoted from the Amateurliga Südbaden, while no club had been relegated from the Bundesliga to the league.

Pos	Team	Pld	W	D	L	GF	GA	GD	Pts	Promotion, qualification or relegation
1	FC Bayern Munich (P)	36	24	7	5	146	32	+114	55	Qualification to promotion playoffs
2	SSV Reutlingen	36	23	6	7	87	45	+42	52	Qualification to promotion playoffs
3	Kickers Offenbach	36	19	10	7	87	45	+42	48	
4	SV Waldhof Mannheim	36	19	8	9	74	50	+24	46	
5	KSV Hessen Kassel	36	17	6	13	74	52	+22	40	
6	VfR Mannheim	36	15	10	11	66	53	+13	40	
7	Stuttgarter Kickers	36	15	10	11	69	59	+10	40	
8	SpVgg Fürth	36	16	7	13	72	62	+10	39	
9	FC Bayern Hof	36	16	4	16	65	58	+7	36	
10	FSV Frankfurt	36	15	6	15	52	59	−7	36	
11	Freiburger FC	36	11	13	12	60	68	−8	35	
12	ESV Ingolstadt	36	13	8	15	55	65	−10	34	
13	1. FC Pforzheim	36	13	7	16	47	61	−14	33	
14	SV Darmstadt 98	36	11	11	14	49	66	−17	33	
15	FC Schweinfurt 05	36	14	4	18	49	55	−6	32	
16	TSV Schwaben Augsburg	36	11	8	17	61	73	−12	30	
17	FC Wacker München (R)	36	10	7	19	54	86	−32	27	Relegation to Amateurliga
18	TSG Ulm 1846 (R)	36	9	6	21	53	90	−37	24	Relegation to Amateurliga
19	FC Emmendingen (R)	36	1	2	33	31	158	−127	4	Relegation to Amateurliga

Source: Fussballdaten.de (in German)
Rules for classification: 1) Points;
(P) Promoted; (R) Relegated

=== Top goalscorers ===
The top goal scorers in the Regionalliga Süd:

Rank	Player	Club	Goals
1	(Germany) Rainer Ohlhauser	Bayern Munich	42
2	(Germany) Gerd Müller	Bayern Munich	33
3	(Germany) Rudolf Bast	VfR Mannheim	32

== Bundesliga promotion round ==
=== Qualifying ===
The runners-up of the Regionalliga Nord and Regionalliga Süd played a two-leg decider to determine which team qualified for the group stage, which SSV Reutlingen won on aggregate.

Team 1	Agg.	Team 2	1st leg	2nd leg
FC St. Pauli (N)	2–4	SSV Reutlingen (S)	1–0	1–4 aet

=== Group 1 ===
Pos	Team	Pld	W	D	L	GF	GA	GD	Pts	Promotion, qualification or relegation
1	Borussia Mönchengladbach (P)	6	3	2	1	17	7	+10	8	Promotion to Bundesliga
2	SSV Reutlingen	6	2	3	1	8	11	−3	7	
3	Holstein Kiel	6	2	2	2	12	9	+3	6	
4	Wormatia Worms	6	1	1	4	7	17	−10	3	

Source: Fussballdaten.de (in German)
Rules for classification: 1) Points;
(P) Promoted

=== Group 2 ===
Pos	Team	Pld	W	D	L	GF	GA	GD	Pts	Promotion, qualification or relegation
1	FC Bayern Munich (P)	6	4	1	1	18	3	+15	9	Promotion to Bundesliga
2	Alemannia Aachen	6	2	2	2	11	12	−1	6	
3	1. FC Saarbrücken	6	3	0	3	12	13	−1	6	
4	Tennis Borussia Berlin	6	1	1	4	10	23	−13	3	

Source: Fussballdaten.de (in German)
Rules for classification: 1) Points;
(P) Promoted
