= Josef Martinelli =

German footballer

Personal information
- Date of birth: 19 March 1936 (age 90)
- Place of birth: Bardenberg, Germany
- Height: 1.81 m (5 ft 11 in)
- Positions: Midfielder; forward

Senior career*
Years	Team	Apps	(Gls)
1951–1970	Alemannia Aachen		
1970–1971	Roda JC		
1971–1977	Westwacht Aachen		

Managerial career
- 1977–1980: Westwacht Aachen
- 1980–1981: Alemannia Aachen (juniors)
- 1981: Alemannia Aachen
- 1982–1988: Alemannia Aachen (juniors)
- * Club domestic league appearances and goals

Josef Martinelli (born 19 March 1936) is a German former football player and manager who played as a midfielder or forward.
