= Michael Pfeiffer (footballer) =

German footballer and manager (1925–2018)

Personal information
- Date of birth: 19 July 1925
- Place of birth: Eschweiler, Germany
- Date of death: 2 January 2018 (aged 92)
- Place of death: Vaals, Netherlands
- Position: Midfielder

Senior career*
Years	Team	Apps	(Gls)
1934–1949	SG Eschweiler		
1949–1958	Alemannia Aachen		
1958–1961	Rot-Weiss Essen		
1961–1963	Fortuna 54 Geleen		

International career
1954	West Germany	1	(0)

Managerial career
- 1963–1965: Roda JC Kerkrade
- Sittardia
- SC Schwenningen
- 1967–1969: Alemannia Aachen
- 1970–1971: FK Pirmasens
- 1972: Austria Salzburg
- SV Arminia Gütersloh
- 1973–1974: Alemannia Aachen
- SV Baesweiler 09
- 1976–1977: BSV Schwenningen
- TuS Langerwehe
- Sporting Jeddah
- 1980–1981: CS Sfax
- * Club domestic league appearances and goals

Michael "Michel" Pfeiffer (19 July 1925 – 2 January 2018) was a German professional football player and manager.

== Career ==
Pfeiffer played for SG Eschweiler, Alemannia Aachen, Rot-Weiss Essen and Fortuna 54 Geleen.

He coached Roda JC Kerkrade, Sittardia, SC Schwenningen, Alemannia Aachen, FK Pirmasens, Austria Salzburg, SV Arminia Gütersloh, SV Baesweiler 09, BSV Schwenningen, TuS Langerwehe, Sporting Jeddah and CS Sfax.
