= 1991–92 NOFV-Oberliga =

NOFV-Oberliga
- Season: 1991–92
- Champions: FC Berlin, 1. FC Union Berlin, FSV Zwickau

The 1991–92 season of the NOFV-Oberliga was the first season of the league at tier three (III) of the German football league system after German reunification.

The NOFV-Oberliga was split into three divisions, NOFV-Oberliga Nord, NOFV-Oberliga Mitte and NOFV-Oberliga Süd. The champions of each division entered into a play-off with the champion of the Oberliga Nord, VfL Wolfsburg. Each team played each other home and away, with Wolfsburg gaining promotion to the 1992–93 2. Fußball-Bundesliga.

== North ==
Pos	Team	Pld	W	D	L	GF	GA	GD	Pts	Qualification or relegation
1	FC Berlin (C)	34	25	7	2	97	15	+82	57	Qualification to 2. Bundesliga playoff
2	Greifswalder SC 1926	34	22	8	4	73	36	+37	52	
3	SG Bergmann-Borsig	34	21	9	4	86	36	+50	51	
4	Tennis Borussia Berlin	34	20	7	7	75	28	+47	47	
5	FV Motor Eberswalde	34	16	9	9	54	42	+12	41	
6	Eisenhüttenstädter FC Stahl	34	15	9	10	58	42	+16	39	
7	MSV Post Neubrandenburg	34	15	8	11	56	42	+14	38	
8	FSV PCK Schwedt	34	13	12	9	51	40	+11	38	
9	Spandauer SV	34	15	6	13	59	57	+2	36	
10	Reinickendorfer Füchse	34	12	11	11	46	47	−1	35	
11	FC Victoria 91 Frankfurt (Oder)	34	11	11	12	53	62	−9	33	
12	Spandauer BC 06	34	12	8	14	52	57	−5	32	
13	Stahl Hennigsdorf (R)	34	11	4	19	49	72	−23	26	Relegation to Verbandsligas
14	FSV Rot-Weiß Prenzlau	34	9	7	18	42	66	−24	25	
15	SC Wacker 04 Berlin (R)	34	5	11	18	40	76	−36	21	Relegation to Verbandsligas
16	BFC Preussen (R)	34	7	7	20	29	66	−37	21	Relegation to Verbandsligas
17	SV Hafen Rostock 61 (R)	34	4	6	24	25	73	−48	14	Relegation to Verbandsligas
18	SV Blau-Weiß Parchim (R)	34	2	2	30	27	115	−88	6	Relegation to Verbandsligas

(C) Champions; (R) Relegated

== Central ==
Pos	Team	Pld	W	D	L	GF	GA	GD	Pts	Qualification or relegation
1	1. FC Union Berlin (C)	38	32	5	1	100	23	+77	69	Qualification to 2. Bundesliga playoff
2	1. FC Magdeburg	38	22	12	4	96	41	+55	56	
3	FC Energie Cottbus	38	23	6	9	102	53	+49	52	
4	Hertha BSC II	38	20	11	7	75	41	+34	51	
5	Lok Altmark Stendal	38	19	12	7	59	36	+23	50	
6	Türkiyemspor Berlin	38	18	12	8	68	41	+27	48	
7	Anhalt Dessau	38	19	6	13	65	59	+6	44	
8	SV Thale 04	38	16	11	11	46	33	+13	43	
9	VfB Lichterfelde	38	15	12	11	53	42	+11	42	
10	Hertha Zehlendorf	38	17	8	13	64	58	+6	42	
11	FSV Glückauf Brieske-Senftenberg	38	10	13	15	50	55	−5	33	
12	Berlin Türkspor 1965	38	12	9	17	53	66	−13	33	
13	NSC Marathon 02	38	11	11	16	49	72	−23	33	
14	FSV Velten	38	12	6	20	51	77	−26	30	
15	SCC Berlin	38	10	9	19	39	68	−29	29	
16	SpVgg Blau-Weiß 1890 Berlin II (R)	38	10	7	21	43	57	−14	27	Relegation to Verbandsligas
17	SC Gatow (R)	38	9	8	21	43	72	−29	26	Relegation to Verbandsligas
18	FV Wannsee (R)	38	7	10	21	41	75	−34	24	Relegation to Verbandsligas
19	BSV Spindlersfeld (R)	38	6	5	27	43	86	−43	17	Relegation to Verbandsligas
20	SV Lichtenberg 47 (R)	38	4	3	31	30	115	−85	11	Relegation to Verbandsligas

(C) Champions; (R) Relegated

== South ==
Pos	Team	Pld	W	D	L	GF	GA	GD	Pts	Qualification or relegation
1	FSV Zwickau (C)	34	27	5	2	85	18	+67	59	Qualification to 2. Bundesliga playoff
2	FC Wismut Aue	34	23	6	5	78	25	+53	52	
3	Bischofswerdaer FV 08	34	19	9	6	65	25	+40	47	
4	1. FC Markkleeberg	34	18	9	7	61	32	+29	45	
5	FC Sachsen Leipzig	34	16	8	10	57	41	+16	40	
6	FSV Hoyerswerda	34	15	7	12	50	41	+9	37	
7	FSV Wacker 90 Nordhausen	34	14	9	11	52	46	+6	37	
8	1. SV Gera	34	14	8	12	44	44	0	36	
9	FC Meißen	34	14	5	15	51	51	0	33	
10	Bornaer SV	34	13	6	15	35	51	−16	32	
11	FV Zeulenroda	34	10	10	14	48	45	+3	30	
12	TSV Stahl Riesa	34	10	10	14	43	43	0	30	
13	Chemnitzer SV 51	34	11	8	15	56	58	−2	30	
14	SC 1903 Weimar	34	12	6	16	37	61	−24	30	
15	Soemtron Sömmerda (R)	34	10	8	16	45	61	−16	28	Relegation to Verbandsligas/Landesligas
16	1. Suhler SV (R)	34	5	15	14	38	63	−25	25	Relegation to Verbandsligas/Landesligas
17	SV Merseburg 99 (R)	34	6	5	23	35	79	−44	17	Relegation to Verbandsligas/Landesligas
18	VFC Plauen (R)	34	1	2	31	12	108	−96	4	Relegation to Verbandsligas/Landesligas

(C) Champions; (R) Relegated

== 2. Bundesliga play-off ==
FC Berlin, 1. FC Union Berlin and FSV Zwickau qualified for the promotion round to the 2. Bundesliga by winning their respective divisions of the NOFV-Oberliga. VfL Wolfsburg was also assigned to the promotion round by winning the Oberliga Nord. The four teams faced each other in two legs and thus each played six matches to determine. VfL Wolfsburg ultimately prevailed, which meant that no team from the former East Germany achieved promotion.

Pos	Team	Pld	W	D	L	GF	GA	GD	Pts	Promotion
1	VfL Wolfsburg (C)	6	5	0	1	15	7	+8	10	Promotion to 2. Bundesliga
2	FSV Zwickau	6	4	0	2	17	11	+6	8	
3	FC Berlin	6	2	0	4	9	8	+1	4	
4	1. FC Union Berlin	6	1	0	5	6	21	−15	2	

(C) Champions
