= Gerd Achterberg =

German football manager (1940–2025)

Personal information
- Date of birth: 4 December 1940
- Place of birth: Berlin, Germany
- Date of death: 5 January 2025 (aged 84)

Senior career*
Years	Team	Apps	(Gls)
	Spandauer BC	327	(131)

Managerial career
- Spandauer BC
- BFC Südring
- BBC Südost
- Spandauer BC
- Spandauer SV
- Reinickendorfer Füchse
- SCC Berlin
- BFC Preussen
- 1984–1985: Tennis Borussia Berlin
- * Club domestic league appearances and goals

Gerd Achterberg (4 December 1940 – 5 January 2025) was a German football manager.

Achterberg scored 131 goals in 327 games for Spandauer BC as a player and later went on to coach the team in two stints as manager. He also led Tennis Borussia Berlin to the 1984–85 Amateur-Oberliga Berlin championship and promotion to the 2. Bundesliga, but was replaced by Eckhard Krautzun in the autumn of 1985 after winning only three out of the season's first 12 games.

Achterberg died on 5 January 2025, at the age of 84.
