= 1958–59 Oberliga =

Oberliga
- Season: 1958–59
- Champions: Hamburger SV Tasmania 1900 Berlin Westfalia Herne FK Pirmasens Eintracht Frankfurt
- Relegated: Eintracht Nordhorn VfL Wolfsburg BFC Südring Rapide Wedding SV Sodingen STV Horst-Emscher TuS Neuendorf SpVgg Weisenau BC Augsburg SV Waldhof Mannheim
- German champions: Eintracht Frankfurt; 1st German title
- Top goalscorer: Uwe Seeler (29 goals)

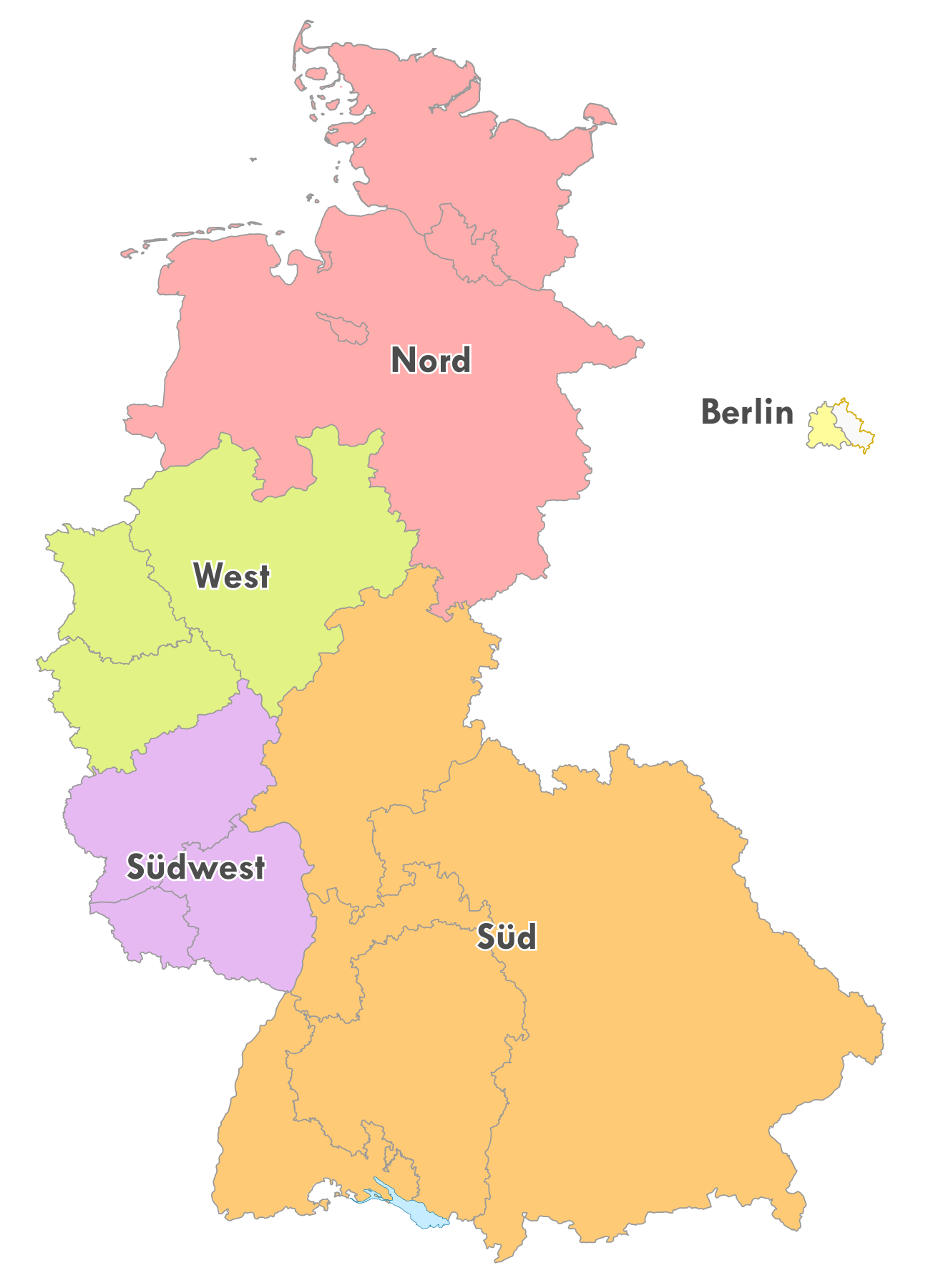
Map of the five German Oberligas 1945 to 1963

The 1958–59 Oberliga was the fourteenth season of the Oberliga, the first tier of the football league system in West Germany. The league operated in five regional divisions, Berlin, North, South, Southwest and West. The five league champions and the runners-up from the west, south, southwest and north then entered the 1959 German football championship which was won by Eintracht Frankfurt. It was Frankfurt's sole national championship win. The 1959 final was one of only two post Second World War finals to go into extra time, the other having been in 1949.

A similar-named league, the DDR-Oberliga, existed in East Germany, set at the first tier of the East German football league system. The 1959 DDR-Oberliga was won by SC Wismut Karl-Marx-Stadt.

== Oberliga Nord ==
The 1958–59 season saw two new clubs in the league, ASV Bergedorf 85 and VfV Hildesheim, both promoted from the Amateurliga. The league's top scorer was Uwe Seeler of Hamburger SV with 29 goals, the highest total for any scorer in the five Oberligas in 1958–59.

Pos	Team	Pld	W	D	L	GF	GA	GD	Pts	Promotion, qualification or relegation
1	Hamburger SV	30	25	2	3	98	29	+69	52	Qualification to German championship
2	Werder Bremen	30	19	4	7	89	57	+32	42	Qualification to German championship
3	VfR Neumünster	30	14	8	8	47	39	+8	36	
4	VfL Osnabrück	30	15	5	10	61	49	+12	35	
5	Eintracht Braunschweig	30	13	7	10	64	55	+9	33	
6	Hannover 96	30	12	8	10	45	41	+4	32	
7	FC St.Pauli	30	11	10	9	52	54	−2	32	
8	FC Altona 93	30	14	3	13	51	46	+5	31	
9	TuS Bremerhaven 93	30	12	4	14	54	66	−12	28	
10	Holstein Kiel	30	12	3	15	57	54	+3	27	
11	ASV Bergedorf 85	30	12	3	15	41	50	−9	27	
12	Concordia Hamburg	30	9	7	14	53	66	−13	25	
13	VfV Hildesheim	30	8	8	14	28	50	−22	24	
14	Phönix Lübeck	30	6	10	14	37	58	−21	22	
15	Eintracht Nordhorn (R)	30	5	8	17	34	72	−38	18	Relegation to Amateurliga
16	VfL Wolfsburg (R)	30	6	4	20	31	56	−25	16	Relegation to Amateurliga

Source: RSSSF.com
Rules for classification: 1) Points;
(R) Relegated

== Oberliga Berlin ==
The 1958–59 season saw two new clubs in the league, BFC Südring and Rapide Wedding, both promoted from the Amateurliga Berlin. The league's top scorer was Reinhard Knöfel of Spandauer SV with 23 goals.

Pos	Team	Pld	W	D	L	GF	GA	GD	Pts	Promotion, qualification or relegation
1	Tasmania 1900 Berlin	33	21	6	6	71	34	+37	48	Qualification to German championship
2	Spandauer SV	33	22	3	8	82	50	+32	47	
3	Hertha BSC Berlin	33	19	5	9	81	56	+25	43	
4	Viktoria 89 Berlin	33	16	8	9	61	45	+16	40	
5	Blau-Weiß 90 Berlin	33	15	5	13	51	47	+4	35	
6	Hertha Zehlendorf	33	13	7	13	55	50	+5	33	
7	Tennis Borussia Berlin	33	15	3	15	67	62	+5	33	
8	Berliner SV 92	33	11	7	15	46	65	−19	29	
9	Union 06 Berlin	33	11	6	16	60	68	−8	28	
10	Wacker 04 Berlin	33	11	6	16	62	80	−18	28	
11	BFC Südring (R)	33	5	7	21	32	73	−41	17	Relegation to Amateurliga Berlin
12	Rapide Wedding (R)	33	5	5	23	43	81	−38	15	Relegation to Amateurliga Berlin

Source: RSSSF.com
Rules for classification: 1) Points;
(R) Relegated

== Oberliga West ==
The 1958–59 season saw two new clubs in the league, STV Horst-Emscher and Borussia München-Gladbach, both promoted from the 2. Oberliga West. The league's top scorer was Gerhard Clement of Westfalia Herne with 28 goals.

Pos	Team	Pld	W	D	L	GF	GA	GD	Pts	Promotion, qualification or relegation
1	Westfalia Herne	30	19	7	4	60	23	+37	45	Qualification to German championship
2	1. FC Köln	30	13	13	4	60	35	+25	39	Qualification to German championship
3	Fortuna Düsseldorf	30	17	5	8	89	56	+33	39	
4	VfL Bochum	30	14	8	8	61	43	+18	36	
5	Borussia Dortmund	30	15	5	10	59	47	+12	35	
6	Rot-Weiß Essen	30	13	6	11	51	42	+9	32	
7	Preußen Münster	30	13	6	11	50	51	−1	32	
8	Meidericher SV	30	12	6	12	44	44	0	30	
9	Duisburger SV	30	8	12	10	55	46	+9	28	
10	Alemannia Aachen	30	12	4	14	52	56	−4	28	
11	FC Schalke 04	30	9	9	12	57	52	+5	27	
12	Rot-Weiß Oberhausen	30	9	9	12	48	65	−17	27	
13	Borussia München-Gladbach	30	8	9	13	39	58	−19	25	
14	Viktoria Köln	30	8	7	15	57	83	−26	23	
15	SV Sodingen (R)	30	6	9	15	34	57	−23	21	Relegation to 2. Oberliga West
16	STV Horst-Emscher (R)	30	4	5	21	32	90	−58	13	Relegation to 2. Oberliga West

Source: RSSSF.com
Rules for classification: 1) Points;
(R) Relegated

== Oberliga Südwest ==
The 1958–59 season saw two new clubs in the league, Sportfreunde Saarbrücken and SpVgg Weisenau, both promoted from the 2. Oberliga Südwest. The league's top scorers were Rudolf Bast (FV Speyer) and Helmut Kapitulski (FK Pirmasens) with 25 goals each.

Pos	Team	Pld	W	D	L	GF	GA	GD	Pts	Promotion, qualification or relegation
1	FK Pirmasens	30	24	4	2	95	32	+63	52	Qualification to German championship
2	Borussia Neunkirchen	30	22	4	4	95	35	+60	48	Qualification to German championship
3	1. FC Kaiserslautern	30	20	4	6	99	44	+55	44	
4	1. FC Saarbrücken	30	17	4	9	85	55	+30	38	
5	Phönix Ludwigshafen	30	15	7	8	64	38	+26	37	
6	Sportfreunde Saarbrücken	30	13	4	13	60	63	−3	30	
7	VfR Frankenthal	30	9	11	10	44	40	+4	29	
8	Eintracht Trier	30	10	8	12	54	61	−7	28	
9	Saar 05 Saarbrücken	30	10	6	14	54	82	−28	26	
10	Eintracht Kreuznach	30	9	7	14	43	75	−32	25	
11	FSV Mainz 05	30	9	6	15	55	78	−23	24	
12	FV Speyer	30	8	7	15	42	71	−29	23	
13	TuRa Ludwigshafen	30	7	8	15	38	63	−25	22	
14	Wormatia Worms	30	9	3	18	48	81	−33	21	
15	TuS Neuendorf (R)	30	5	8	17	56	81	−25	18	Relegation to 2. Oberliga Südwest
16	SpVgg Weisenau (R)	30	3	9	18	40	73	−33	15	Relegation to 2. Oberliga Südwest

Source: RSSSF.com
Rules for classification: 1) Points;
(R) Relegated

== Oberliga Süd ==
The 1958–59 season saw two new clubs in the league, TSG Ulm 1846 and SV Waldhof Mannheim, both promoted from the 2. Oberliga Süd. The league's top scorer was Ernst-Otto Meyer of VfR Mannheim with 27 goals, a record third time finishing as the league's top scorer.

Pos	Team	Pld	W	D	L	GF	GA	GD	Pts	Promotion, qualification or relegation
1	Eintracht Frankfurt (C)	30	22	5	3	71	25	+46	49	Qualification to German championship
2	Kickers Offenbach	30	20	7	3	73	31	+42	47	Qualification to German championship
3	1. FC Nürnberg	30	19	5	6	80	38	+42	43	
4	Bayern München	30	17	5	8	79	49	+30	39	
5	VfB Stuttgart	30	11	8	11	61	49	+12	30	
6	TSV 1860 München	30	12	6	12	61	57	+4	30	
7	SpVgg Fürth	30	11	8	11	47	45	+2	30	
8	VfR Mannheim	30	12	5	13	65	71	−6	29	
9	Karlsruher SC	30	12	4	14	73	69	+4	28	
10	FC Schweinfurt 05	30	8	9	13	47	59	−12	25	
11	FSV Frankfurt	30	10	4	16	49	69	−20	24	
12	SSV Reutlingen	30	9	6	15	44	71	−27	24	
13	TSG Ulm 1846	30	8	6	16	39	57	−18	22	
14	Viktoria Aschaffenburg	30	9	4	17	43	69	−26	22	
15	BC Augsburg (R)	30	9	2	19	53	85	−32	20	Relegation to 2. Oberliga Süd
16	SV Waldhof Mannheim (R)	30	5	8	17	43	84	−41	18	Relegation to 2. Oberliga Süd

Source: RSSSF.com
Rules for classification: 1) Points;
(C) Champions; (R) Relegated

== German championship ==
The 1959 German football championship was contested by the nine qualified Oberliga teams and won by Eintracht Frankfurt, defeating Kickers Offenbach in the final. The runners-up of the Oberliga Nord and Südwest played a pre-qualifying match. The remaining eight clubs then played a home-and-away round in two groups of four. The two group winners then advanced to the final.

=== Qualifying ===
Team 1	Score	Team 2
Werder Bremen	6–3	Borussia Neunkirchen

=== Group 1 ===
Pos	Team	Pld	W	D	L	GF	GA	GD	Pts	Promotion, qualification or relegation
1	Eintracht Frankfurt (Q)	6	6	0	0	26	11	+15	12	Qualified to final
2	1. FC Köln	6	2	1	3	10	14	−4	5	
3	FK Pirmasens	6	2	0	4	16	18	−2	4	
4	Werder Bremen	6	1	1	4	12	21	−9	3	

Source: RSSSF.com
Rules for classification: 1) Points;
(Q) Qualified for the phase indicated

=== Group 2 ===
Pos	Team	Pld	W	D	L	GF	GA	GD	Pts	Promotion, qualification or relegation
1	Kickers Offenbach (Q)	6	4	1	1	14	9	+5	9	Qualified to final
2	Hamburger SV	6	4	0	2	13	8	+5	8	
3	Westfalia Herne	6	2	0	4	8	13	−5	4	
4	Tasmania 1900 Berlin	6	1	1	4	6	11	−5	3	

Source: RSSSF.com
Rules for classification: 1) Points;
(Q) Qualified for the phase indicated

=== Final ===
Team 1	Score	Team 2
Eintracht Frankfurt	5–3 aet	Kickers Offenbach
