= 1965–66 Regionalliga =

Regionalliga
- Season: 1965–66
- Champions: FC St. Pauli Hertha BSC Berlin Fortuna Düsseldorf FK Pirmasens FC Schweinfurt 05
- Promoted: Fortuna Düsseldorf Rot-Weiß Essen
- Relegated: SV Friedrichsort Victoria Hamburg SC Tegel SC Gatow Viktoria 89 Berlin VfB Bottrop STV Horst-Emscher SC Ludwigshafen BSC Oppau TSC Zweibrücken ESV Ingolstadt SpVgg Weiden VfR Pforzheim

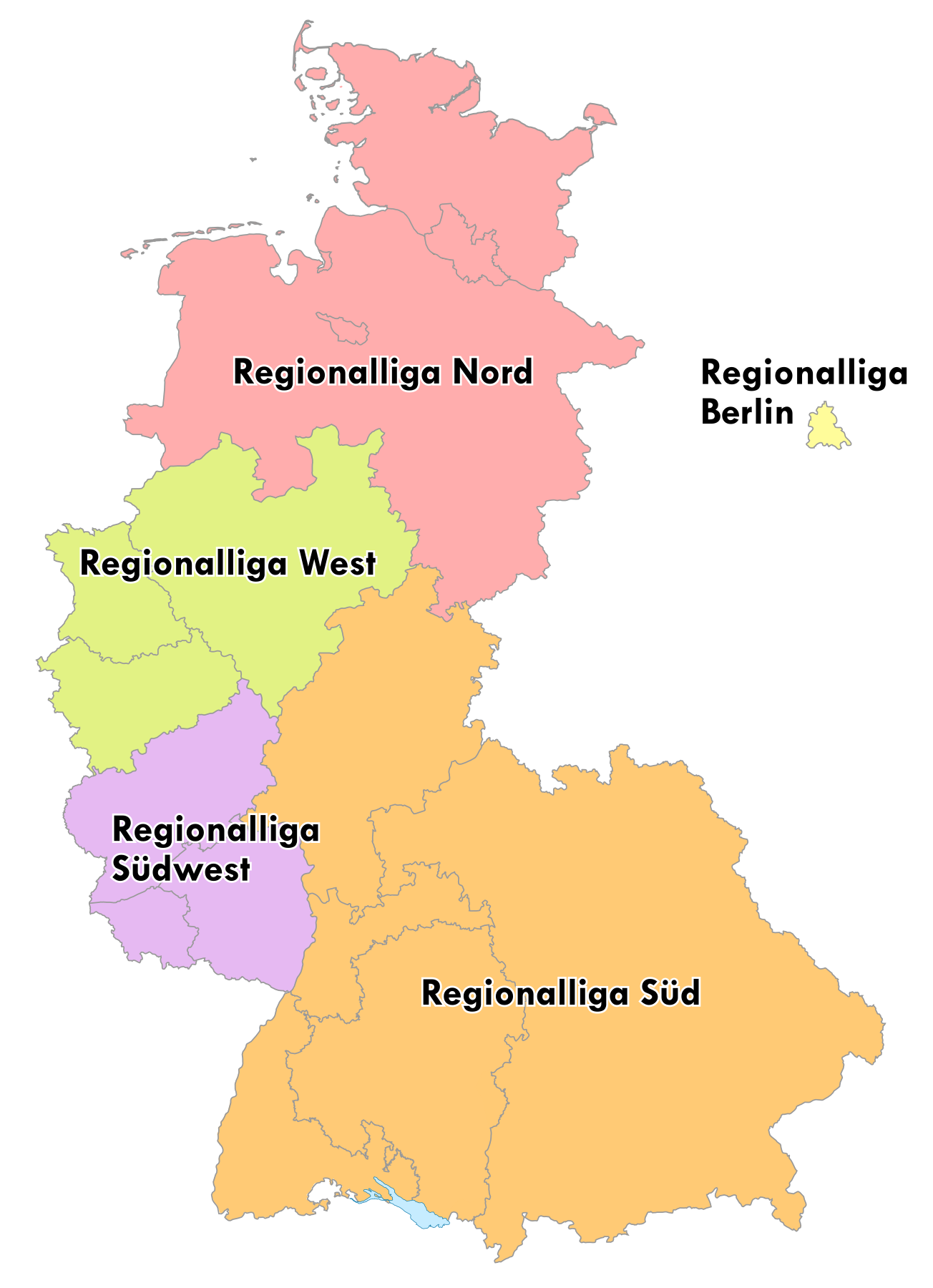
Map of the five German Regionalligas from 1963 to 1974

The 1965–66 Regionalliga was the third season of the Regionalliga, the second tier of the German football league system. The league operated in five regional divisions, Berlin, North, South, Southwest and West. The five league champions and four runners-up, the Regionalliga Berlin runners-up was not qualified, entered a promotion play-off to determine the two clubs to move up to the Bundesliga for the next season. The two promotion spots went to the Regionalliga West champions Fortuna Düsseldorf and runners-up Rot-Weiß Essen.

== Regionalliga Nord ==
The 1965–66 season saw two new clubs in the league, Bremer SV and Itzehoer SV, both promoted from the Amateurliga, while no club had been relegated from the Bundesliga to the league.

Pos	Team	Pld	W	D	L	GF	GA	GD	Pts	Promotion, qualification or relegation
1	FC St. Pauli	32	20	4	8	84	39	+45	44	Qualification to promotion playoffs
2	Göttingen 05	32	20	3	9	65	32	+33	43	Qualification to promotion playoffs
3	Holstein Kiel	32	18	7	7	68	41	+27	43	
4	TuS Bremerhaven 93	32	15	8	9	61	47	+14	38	
5	VfB Lübeck	32	12	12	8	44	35	+9	36	
6	Arminia Hannover	32	15	5	12	67	49	+18	35	
7	VfL Osnabrück	32	14	4	14	56	55	+1	32	
8	VfL Wolfsburg	32	15	2	15	55	55	0	32	
9	Concordia Hamburg	32	13	6	13	49	52	−3	32	
10	FC Altona 93	32	13	5	14	41	47	−6	31	
11	ASV Bergedorf 85	32	13	4	15	56	65	−9	30	
12	VfB Oldenburg	32	10	10	12	58	69	−11	30	
13	Bremer SV	32	13	2	17	58	68	−10	28	
14	Itzehoer SV	32	11	6	15	58	60	−2	28	
15	VfV Hildesheim	32	8	9	15	35	54	−19	25	
16	SV Friedrichsort (R)	32	9	4	19	45	74	−29	22	Relegation to Amateurliga
17	Victoria Hamburg (R)	32	4	7	21	36	84	−48	15	Relegation to Amateurliga

Source: Fussballdaten.de (in German)
Rules for classification: 1) Points;
(R) Relegated

== Regionalliga Berlin ==
The 1965–66 season saw seven new clubs in the league, 1. FC Neukölln, VfB Hermsdorf, Lichterfelder SU, SC Tegel, SC Gatow and SC Staaken, all promoted from the Amateurliga as the Regionalliga had been expanded from 10 to 16 clubs, while Hertha BSC Berlin had been relegated from the Bundesliga to the league.

Pos	Team	Pld	W	D	L	GF	GA	GD	Pts	Promotion, qualification or relegation
1	Hertha BSC Berlin	30	29	0	1	136	25	+111	58	Qualification to promotion playoffs
2	Tennis Borussia Berlin	30	21	2	7	108	50	+58	44	
3	Spandauer SV	30	18	6	6	88	53	+35	42	
4	Wacker 04 Berlin	30	16	4	10	77	52	+25	36	
5	Hertha Zehlendorf	30	16	3	11	53	43	+10	35	
6	SC Staaken	30	14	6	10	54	47	+7	34	
7	BFC Südring Berlin	30	10	8	12	49	53	−4	28	
8	1. FC Neukölln	30	11	6	13	51	62	−11	28	
9	Berliner SV 92	30	13	1	16	49	65	−16	27	
10	Blau-Weiß 90 Berlin	30	10	5	15	50	58	−8	25	
11	Reinickendorfer Füchse	30	10	5	15	50	70	−20	25	
12	VfB Hermsdorf	30	10	4	16	61	75	−14	24	
13	Lichterfelder SU	30	9	5	16	34	82	−48	23	
14	SC Tegel (R)	30	8	6	16	34	76	−42	22	Relegation to Amateurliga
15	SC Gatow (R)	30	7	5	18	36	60	−24	19	Relegation to Amateurliga
16	Viktoria 89 Berlin (R)	30	3	4	23	34	93	−59	10	Relegation to Amateurliga

Source: Fussballdaten.de (in German)
Rules for classification: 1) Points;
(R) Relegated

== Regionalliga West ==
The 1965–66 season saw two new clubs in the league, VfL Bochum and VfB Bottrop, both promoted from the Amateurliga, while no club had been relegated from the Bundesliga to the league.

Pos	Team	Pld	W	D	L	GF	GA	GD	Pts	Promotion, qualification or relegation
1	Fortuna Düsseldorf (P)	34	26	6	2	79	22	+57	58	Qualification to promotion playoffs
2	Rot-Weiß Essen (P)	34	23	7	4	74	31	+43	53	Qualification to promotion playoffs
3	Alemannia Aachen	34	24	3	7	97	40	+57	51	
4	Rot-Weiß Oberhausen	34	16	5	13	61	46	+15	37	
5	Wuppertaler SV	34	13	11	10	49	43	+6	37	
6	Preußen Münster	34	13	8	13	55	47	+8	34	
7	Schwarz-Weiß Essen	34	13	8	13	47	47	0	34	
8	Sportfreunde Hamborn	34	13	8	13	44	46	−2	34	
9	Viktoria Köln	34	13	8	13	51	59	−8	34	
10	Arminia Bielefeld	34	13	6	15	60	58	+2	32	
11	Eintracht Duisburg	34	11	8	15	47	53	−6	30	
12	VfL Bochum	34	12	6	16	46	66	−20	30	
13	TSV Marl-Hüls	34	11	7	16	47	58	−11	29	
14	Bayer Leverkusen	34	9	8	17	49	75	−26	26	
15	Westfalia Herne	34	8	10	16	39	66	−27	26	
16	Eintracht Gelsenkirchen	34	7	12	15	36	67	−31	26	
17	VfB Bottrop (R)	34	8	8	18	47	68	−21	24	Relegation to Amateurliga
18	STV Horst-Emscher (R)	34	6	5	23	42	78	−36	17	Relegation to Amateurliga

Source: Fussballdaten.de (in German)
Rules for classification: 1) Points;
(P) Promoted; (R) Relegated

== Regionalliga Südwest ==
The 1965–66 season saw one new club in the league, SV Alsenborn, promoted from the Amateurliga, while no club had been relegated from the Bundesliga to the league.

Pos	Team	Pld	W	D	L	GF	GA	GD	Pts	Promotion, qualification or relegation
1	FK Pirmasens	30	17	7	6	62	31	+31	41	Qualification to promotion playoffs
2	1. FC Saarbrücken	30	18	4	8	89	40	+49	40	Qualification to promotion playoffs
3	FSV Mainz 05	30	16	6	8	66	39	+27	38	
4	TuS Neuendorf	30	18	2	10	81	62	+19	38	
5	Wormatia Worms	30	14	4	12	52	41	+11	32	
6	Saar 05 Saarbrücken	30	12	8	10	44	39	+5	32	
7	VfR Frankenthal	30	12	7	11	55	50	+5	31	
8	Röchling Völklingen	30	13	5	12	52	58	−6	31	
9	SV Alsenborn	30	11	8	11	57	55	+2	30	
10	SpVgg Weisenau	30	13	2	15	61	66	−5	28	
11	Südwest Ludwigshafen	30	10	7	13	46	50	−4	27	
12	Phönix Bellheim	30	11	4	15	36	60	−24	26	
13	Eintracht Trier	30	9	7	14	44	49	−5	25	
14	SC Ludwigshafen (R)	30	9	4	17	43	61	−18	22	Relegation to Amateurliga
15	BSC Oppau (R)	30	9	3	18	37	84	−47	21	Relegation to Amateurliga
16	TSC Zweibrücken (R)	30	7	4	19	41	81	−40	18	Relegation to Amateurliga

Source: Fussballdaten.de (in German)
Rules for classification: 1) Points;
(R) Relegated

== Regionalliga Süd ==
The 1965–66 season saw three new clubs in the league, Opel Rüsselsheim, VfR Pforzheim and SpVgg Weiden, all promoted from the Amateurliga, while no club had been relegated from the Bundesliga to the league.

Pos	Team	Pld	W	D	L	GF	GA	GD	Pts	Promotion, qualification or relegation
1	FC Schweinfurt 05	34	22	5	7	74	39	+35	49	Qualification to promotion playoffs
2	Kickers Offenbach	34	20	8	6	78	48	+30	48	Qualification to promotion playoffs
3	SV Waldhof Mannheim	34	18	3	13	78	60	+18	39	
4	SpVgg Fürth	34	16	6	12	70	52	+18	38	
5	Stuttgarter Kickers	34	14	9	11	65	52	+13	37	
6	KSV Hessen Kassel	34	13	10	11	70	62	+8	36	
7	1. FC Pforzheim	34	13	10	11	48	46	+2	36	
8	SSV Reutlingen	34	14	6	14	60	50	+10	34	
9	FC Bayern Hof	34	12	10	12	71	63	+8	34	
10	Opel Rüsselsheim	34	13	8	13	58	61	−3	34	
11	Schwaben Augsburg	34	13	7	14	66	62	+4	33	
12	VfR Mannheim	34	10	13	11	55	60	−5	33	
13	SV Darmstadt 98	34	14	5	15	54	71	−17	33	
14	FSV Frankfurt	34	14	4	16	61	76	−15	32	
15	Freiburger FC	34	11	7	16	55	59	−4	29	
16	ESV Ingolstadt (R)	34	12	5	17	63	75	−12	29	Relegation to Amateurliga
17	SpVgg Weiden (R)	34	10	7	17	51	64	−13	27	Relegation to Amateurliga
18	VfR Pforzheim (R)	34	4	3	27	45	122	−77	11	Relegation to Amateurliga

Source: Fussballdaten.de (in German)
Rules for classification: 1) Points;
(R) Relegated

== Bundesliga promotion round ==
=== Qualifying ===
The runners-up of the Regionalliga Nord and Regionalliga Südwest played a two-leg decider to determine which team qualified for the group stage, which 1. FC Saarbrücken won on aggregate.

Team 1	Agg.	Team 2	1st leg	2nd leg
1. FC Saarbrücken (SW)	7–0	SC Göttingen 05 (N)	4–0	3–0

=== Group 1 ===
Pos	Team	Pld	W	D	L	GF	GA	GD	Pts	Promotion, qualification or relegation
1	Fortuna Düsseldorf (P)	6	4	0	2	17	8	+9	8	Promotion to Bundesliga
2	FK Pirmasens	6	3	2	1	10	8	+2	8	
3	Hertha BSC Berlin	6	2	1	3	8	11	−3	5	
4	Kickers Offenbach	6	1	1	4	5	13	−8	3	

Source: Fussballdaten.de (in German)
Rules for classification: 1) Points;
(P) Promoted

=== Group 2 ===
Pos	Team	Pld	W	D	L	GF	GA	GD	Pts	Promotion, qualification or relegation
1	Rot-Weiß Essen (P)	6	4	0	2	10	6	+4	8	Promotion to Bundesliga
2	FC St.Pauli	6	4	0	2	10	8	+2	8	
3	1. FC Saarbrücken	6	2	1	3	12	11	+1	5	
4	FC Schweinfurt 05	6	1	1	4	6	13	−7	3	

Source: Fussballdaten.de (in German)
Rules for classification: 1) Points;
(P) Promoted
