= Amateur-Oberliga Berlin =

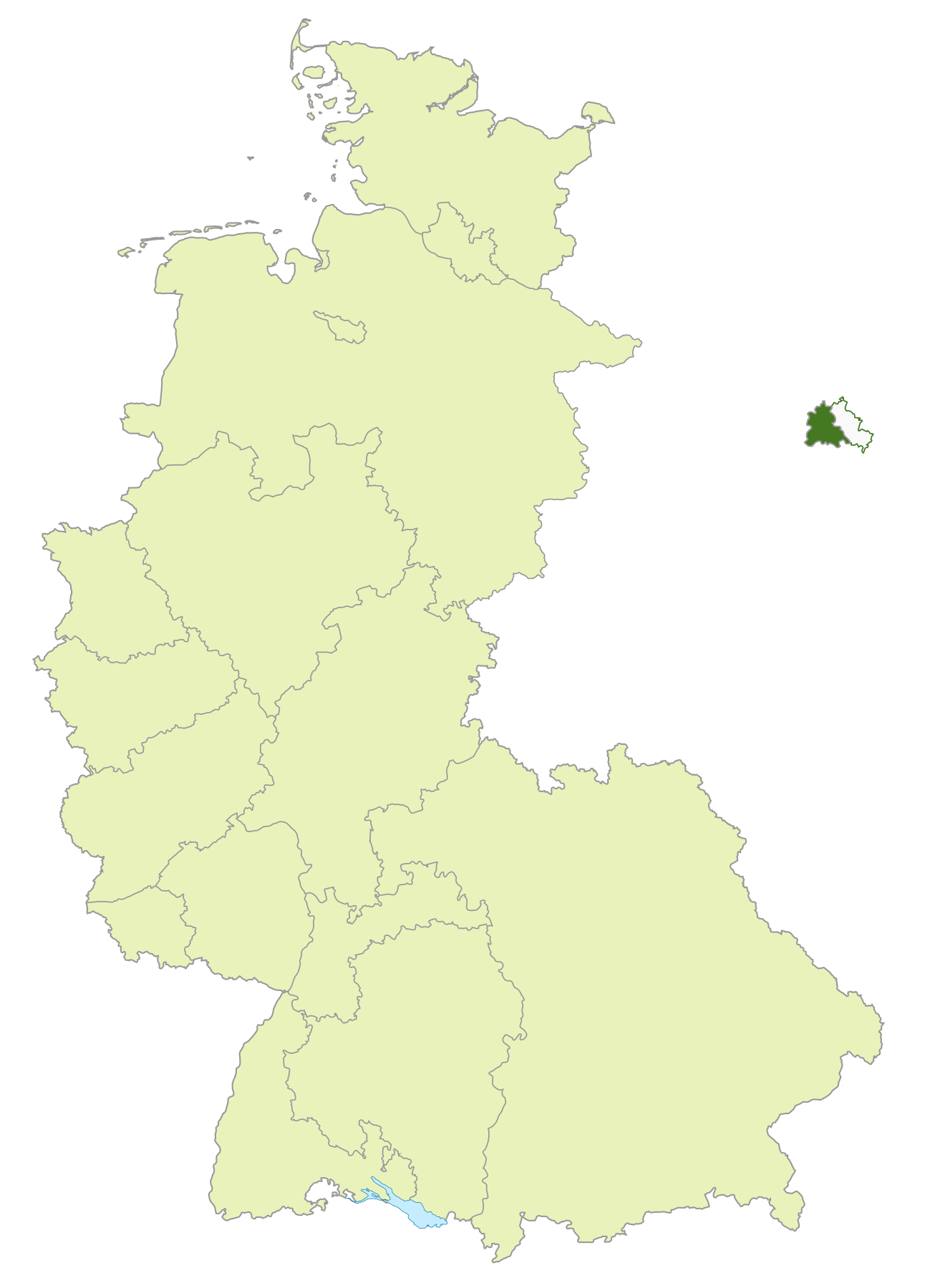
- Founded: 1947
- Folded: 1991 (44 seasons)
- Replaced by: NOFV-Oberliga
- Country: Germany
- State: Berlin
- Level on pyramid: Level 3
- Promotion to: Oberliga Berlin (1947–63); Regionalliga Berlin (1963–74); 2nd Bundesliga Nord (1974–81); 2nd Bundesliga (1981–91)
- Relegation to: Landesliga Berlin
- Domestic cup(s): Berlin Cup
- Last champions: Tennis Borussia Berlin (1990–91)

The Amateur-Oberliga Berlin was the second tier of the German football league system in the city of West Berlin in Germany from 1947 until the formation of the Bundesliga in 1963, operating under the name of Amateurliga Berlin. After 1963, it was the third tier until 1991, when the league was disbanded. In 1974, the league changed its name from Amateurliga Berlin to Amateur-Oberliga Berlin.

== Overview ==
The league was formed under the name of Amateurliga Berlin in 1947 as the second tier of play in the then still united city of Berlin, below the "old" Oberliga Berlin.

The league operated with two groups in the 1947-48 season, split into four groups the year after, returned to two in 1949-50 and run in one single group from then onwards. After this season, the East Berlin clubs left the Berlin league system to join that of East Germany instead.

It consisted of twelve teams from 1950, with the two first placed clubs gaining promotion to the Oberliga and the two bottom placed teams being relegated to the Landesliga. The number of clubs was extended to fifteen in 1952, with a third team being relegated from then on. In 1959, the number of clubs was extended to sixteen.

With the introduction of the Bundesliga in 1963, the "old" Oberliga Berlin was disbanded and the new second-tier Regionalliga Berlin became the highest league in the city of West-Berlin, absorbing most of its clubs. Three clubs from the Amateurliga Berlin were admitted to the new Regionalliga in 1963, these being the Blau-Weiß 90 Berlin, Union 06 Berlin and Reinickendorfer Füchse.

The league continued with sixteen clubs and three relegated teams but only one promotion spot now to the Regionalliga. With the enlargement of the Regionalliga in 1965, six clubs from the Amateurliga were admitted and a second promotion spot was granted to the league from then on. In 1969, a seventeenth club was added, the year after an eighteenth.

With the introduction of the 2nd Bundesliga Nord and the disbanding of the Regionalliga Berlin in 1974, the Amateurliga became the highest league in Berlin, still as the third tier of the German league system. Nine of the twelve clubs from the Regionalliga went to the Amateurliga which meant that the Amateurliga clubs placed ninth to eighteens were relegated to the Landesliga to keep the number of teams in the league to eighteen. With the reorganization of the Regionalligas in 1974, the league was renamed Amateur-Oberliga Berlin.

From 1974, the champions of the Amateurliga had to take part in a promotion play-off to determine the teams promoted to the 2nd Bundesliga. In 1976, the league was reduced to sixteen clubs. Unlike the other Oberliga champions, the winner of the Berlin league was not directly promoted to the 2nd Bundesliga after this but had to play out a series against the runners-up of the Oberliga Nord, which they lost both times, in 1979 and 1980.

The inception of a single 2nd Bundesliga in 1981 meant no team was promoted from the Oberligas that year and after 1981, the Oberliga Berlin champion had to play-off with the winners of the Oberligas Nord, Westfalen and Nordrhein.

With the German reunion came the reorganization of the football in former East Germany. The Oberliga Berlin was disbanded and its clubs spread between the NOFV-Oberligas Nord and Mitte. The teams placed fifteens and sixteenth went to the new Verbandsliga Berlin.

== League champions ==
The league champions:

Season	Club	Club	Club	Club
1947-48	Minerva 93 Berlin	SV Lichtenberg 47	Viktoria 89 Berlin	—
1948-49	Hertha Berlin	SC Tasmania 1900 Berlin	VfB Britz	VfL Nord
1949-50	SV Lichtenberg 47	Minerva 93 Berlin	—	—

Season	Club
1950-51	VfL Nord
1951–52	Steglitzer SC Südwest
1952-53	Hertha Zehlendorf
1953-54	BFC Südring
1954–55	Hertha Zehlendorf
1955–56	BFC Südring
1956-57	Alemannia 90 Berlin
1957-58	Rapide Wedding
1958-59	Norden-Nordwest Berlin
1959-60	Polizei SV Berlin
1960-61	Union 06 Berlin
1961-62	SC Tegel
1962-63	Blau-Weiß 90 Berlin
1963-64	Viktoria 89 Berlin

Season	Club
1964–65	1. FC Neukölln
1965-66	Rapide Wedding
1966-67	1. FC Neukölln
1967-68	SC Staaken
1968–69	TuS Wannsee
1969-70	Alemannia 90 Berlin
1970-71	BSV 1892 Berlin
1971-72	BFC Preußen Berlin
1972-73	BBC Südost
1973-74	SC Staaken
Becomes highest league in Berlin
1974-75	Spandauer SV
1975-76	SC Union 06 Berlin
1976-77	BFC Preußen Berlin

Season	Club
1977-78	Wacker 04 Berlin
1978-79	Hertha Zehlendorf
1979–80	BFC Preußen Berlin
1980-81	BFC Preußen Berlin
1981-82	Tennis Borussia Berlin
1982-83	SC Charlottenburg
1983-84	Blau-Weiß 90 Berlin
1984-85	Tennis Borussia Berlin
1985-86	SC Charlottenburg
1986-87	Hertha Berlin
1987-88	Hertha Berlin
1988-89	Reinickendorfer Füchse
1989-90	Reinickendorfer Füchse
1990-91	Tennis Borussia Berlin

Source:"Oberliga Berlin" (in German). Das deutsche Fussball–Archiv.

== Placings in the league 1963 to 1991 ==
The complete list of clubs in the league and their final placings:

Club	64	65	66	67	68	69	70	71	72	73	74	75	76	77	78	79	80	81	82	83	84	85	86	87	88	89	90	91
Hertha BSC	B	B	RL	RL	RL	B	B	B	B	B	B	B	B	B	B	B	B	2B	2B	B	2B	2B	2B	1	1	2B	2B	B
Blau-Weiß 90 Berlin	RL	RL	RL	RL	RL	RL	RL	RL	RL	RL	RL	4	4	7	15		13	16			1	2B	2B	B	2B	2B	2B	2B
Tennis Borussia Berlin	RL	RL	RL	RL	RL	RL	RL	RL	RL	RL	RL	B	2B	B	2B	2B	2B	2B	1	3	2	1	2B	2	2	8	3	1
Türkiyemspor Berlin																									5	5	8	2
Hertha Zehlendorf	RL	RL	RL	RL	RL	RL	RL	RL	RL	RL	RL	2	10	6	7	1	5	4	2	2	5	4	3	4	8	2	2	3
Spandauer SV	RL	RL	RL	RL	RL	RL	RL	RL	RL	RL	RL	1	2B	3	3	12	9	10	7	11	11	3	6	8	7	3	7	4
Reinickendorfer Füchse	RL	RL	RL	RL	RL	RL	7	10	8	5	5	7	8	4	9	9	11	2	5	9	3	5	4	10	3	1	1	5
Hertha BSC II ^{2}						3	11	18					2	2	6	4	4	7	10	8	4	11	10			6	9	6
Spandauer BC					8	8	15				16			10	11	6	8	13	11	12	10	9	9	6	9	13	11	7
Blau-Weiß 90 Berlin II																										14	16	8
Wacker 04 Berlin	RL	RL	RL	RL	RL	RL	RL	RL	RL	RL	RL	2B	2B	2B	1	2B	3	15							4	4	12	9
BFC Preußen								3	1	RL	RL		7	1	2	2	1	1	4	5	8	14	5	9	11	10	14	10
SC Charlottenburg																			3	1	2B	2	1	16		15	4	11
SC Gatow	2	2	RL	9	15	14												9	15			12	11	11	13	17		12
VfB Lichterfelde ^{3}																											5	13
Marathon Berlin																												14
Rapide Wedding	11	7	1	RL	RL	RL	RL	RL	RL	RL	RL	6	6	12	12	11	10	14		13	12	13	13	13	14	12	13	15
Tasmania Berlin ^{1}	RL	RL	B	RL	RL	RL	RL	RL	RL	RL									9	14	13	7	8	3	6	9	10	16
SC Siemensstadt																										7	15	
Frohnauer SC																											16	
Traber FC Mariendorf													17				12	5	13	6	7	8	2	5	10	11	17	
TSV Rudow																								14	12	16		
VfB Sperber Neukölln						9	12	11	10	15	4	15				14							12	7	15			
Lichterfelder SU ^{3}	6	6	RL	RL	14											5	2	8	6	4	6	10	7	12	16			
FV Brandenburg-Lichterfelde ^{3}																13	16							15				
TuS Makkabi Berlin																				7	9	6	14					
Lichtenrader BC 25						5	9	14															15					
SC Westend 01										2	RL	3	3	8	8	8	14	11	14	15			16					
Neuköllner Sportfreunde		16		1	RL	2	RL	13	17									3	8	10	14	15						
SC Union 06 Berlin	RL	9	15		7	4	16			3	10	8	1	9	4	4	7	12	16			16						
Preußen Wilmersdorf											11		16								15							
BSC Rehberge Berlin			11	16							17										16							
BFC Viktoria 1889	1	RL	RL	15											5	7	6	6	12	16								
Tennis Borussia Berlin II	15						5	7	5	7	7	9	5	5	10	10	15											
Hellas Nordwest	8	14	13	12	12	10	13	8	13	11	9			13	13	16												
BSV 1892 Berlin	RL	RL	RL	RL	RL	RL	RL	1	RL	RL	RL	5	11	11	14	15												
Rot-Weiß Neukölln									2	RL	15				16													
Polizei SV Berlin	12	15	12	6	5	12	10	16	6	8	3	11	9	15														
Wacker Siemensstadt											8	10	12	16														
SC Staaken	5	5	RL	RL	1	RL	RL	RL	3	6	1	14	14															
BBC Südost							3	4	7	1	RL	13	15															
1. FC Neukölln	10	1	RL	RL	RL	RL	RL	RL	RL	RL	RL	12	18															
Kickers 1900 Berlin	9	8	2	RL	RL	RL	RL	15	14	13	6	16																
Alemannia 90 Berlin			3	3	RL	RL	1	RL	RL	RL	RL	17																
BFC Südring	RL	RL	RL	RL	RL	RL	4	5	9	10	2	18																
RFC Alt-Holland										4	12																	
TuS Wannsee			6	8	4	1	RL	RL	RL	9	13																	
SC Südwest		13	9	7	13	13	14	12	11	14	14																	
Meteor 06 Berlin	7	11	5	5	2	RL	RL	2	RL	12	18																	
SC Tegel	4	3	RL	13	6	7	6	9	4	16																		
SC des Westens 97									15	17																		
VfL Nord Berlin	14		8	4	3	RL	2	RL	12	18																		
BFC Nordstern	3	12	7	10	10	6	8	6	16																			
Normannia 08 Berlin									18																			
VfB Hermsdorf	13	4	RL	RL	RL	15		17																				
Hertha 06 Berlin			10	11	11	11	17																					
VfL Schöneberg				14	9	16																						
Tasmania 1900 Berlin II *		4	2	16																								
Minerva Berlin	16		14																									
VfB Pankow		10	16																									

- ^{1} In 1973 SC Tasmania 1900 Berlin went bankrupt and was reformed as Tasmania 73 Berlin . In 2001 the club changed its name to SV Tasmania-Gropiusstadt 1973. In 2011 the club changed its name to SV Tasmania Berlin.
- ^{2} In 1986 Hertha BSC Berlin II had to withdraw from the league due to the relegation of the first team.
- ^{3} In 1988 Lichterfelder SU merged with FV Brandednburg-Lichterfelde to form VfB Lichterfelde. In 2004 the club changed its name to Lichterfelder FC.

=== Key ===
Symbol	Key
B	Bundesliga (1963–present)
RL 2B	Regionalliga Berlin (1963–74): 2. Bundesliga (1974–present)
1	League champions
Place	League place
Blank	Played at a league level below this league

== Founding members of the Amateurliga Berlin ==
The first proper season of the Amateurliga Berlin took place in 1950, after the East German clubs had left and the league was reduced to one group only. The founder members of this league were:

- VfL Nord Berlin
- BFC Nordstern
- VfL Schöneberg
- Hertha Zehlendorf
- Frohnauer SC
- Steglitzer SC Südwest
- SC Tegel
- SC Charlottenburg
- SC Staaken
- BSC Rehberge Berlin
- Alemannia 06 Haselhorst
- Hakoah Berlin

== Disbanding of the Oberliga Berlin ==
The league was disbanded in 1991, its clubs spread between the new NOFV-Oberligas Mitte and Nord and the Verbandsliga Berlin.

To the NOFV-Oberliga Nord:

- Tennis Borussia Berlin
- Spandauer SV
- Reinickendorfer Füchse
- Spandauer BC
- Wacker 04 Berlin
- BFC Preußen Berlin

To the NOFV-Oberliga Mitte:

- Hertha BSC Berlin II
- Türkiyemspor Berlin
- VfB Lichterfelde
- Hertha Zehlendorf
- Türkspor Berlin
- NSC Marathon 02
- SC Charlottenburg
- Blau-Weiß 90 Berlin II
- SC Gatow
- FV Wannsee

To the Verbandsliga Berlin:

- Rapide Wedding
- SV Tasmania 73 Neukölln

The Berlin-Liga (formerly Verbandsliga Berlin) is now the highest league in the city of Berlin. The NOFV-Oberliga Mitte existed for only three seasons, then its clubs were spread between the other two NOFV-Oberligas, Nord and Süd. All clubs on this level based in Berlin now play in the northern group.
