= Regionalliga Berlin =

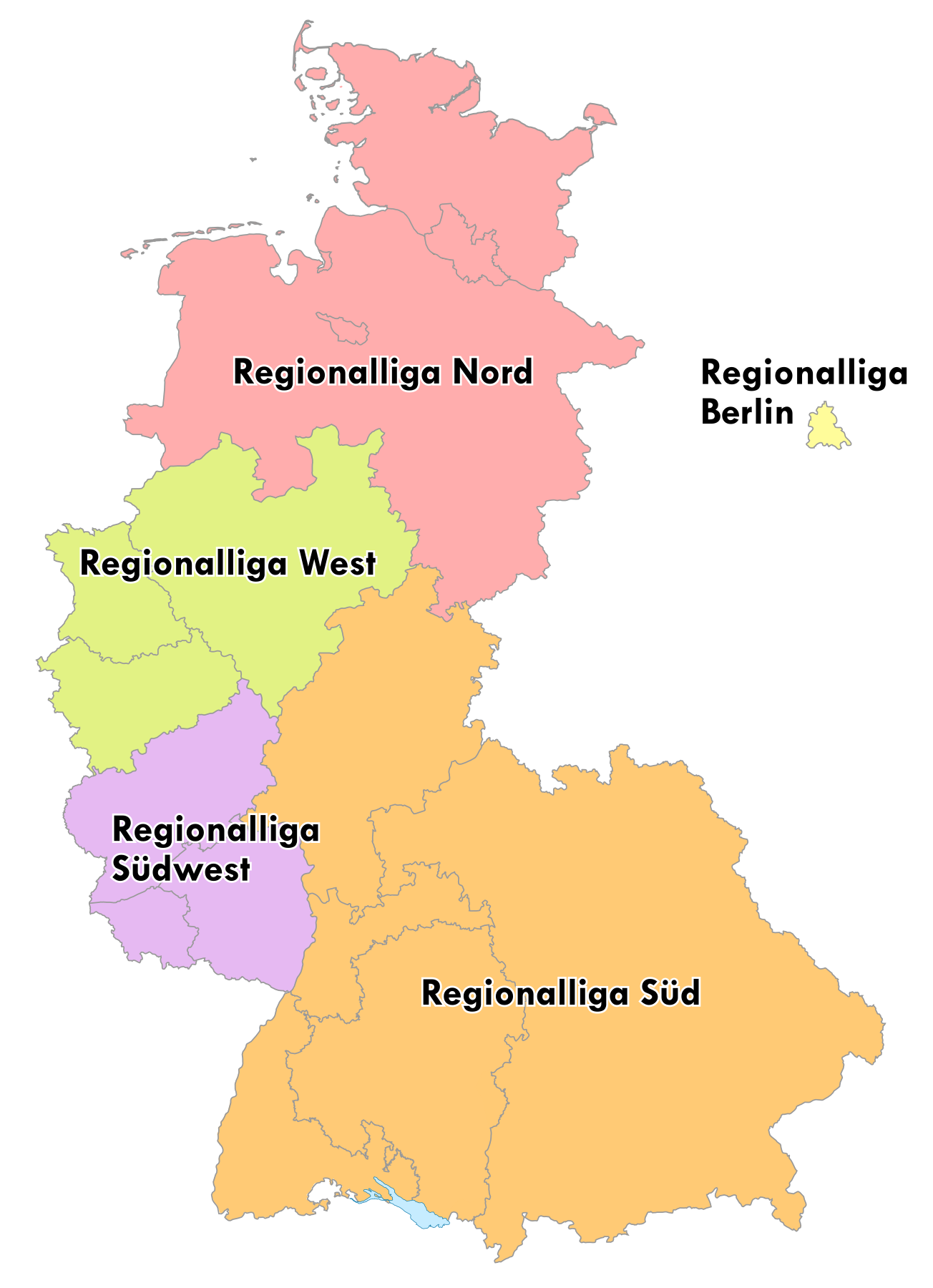
- Founded: 1963
- Folded: 1974 (11 seasons)
- Replaced by: 2. Bundesliga Nord
- Country: Germany
- Level on pyramid: Level 2
- Promotion to: Bundesliga
- Relegation to: Amateurliga Berlin
- Last champions: Tennis Borussia Berlin (1973–74)

The Regionalliga Berlin was the second-highest level of the German football league system in the city of West-Berlin in Germany from 1963 until the formation of the 2. Bundesliga in 1974. It was by far the smallest of the five Regionalligas.

== Overview ==
The Regionalliga Berlin started out in 1963 with 10 teams in the league. From 1965 the league was expanded to 16 clubs. In 1969-70 the league played with 14 clubs and after that always with 12.

It was formed from the clubs of the Oberliga Berlin which finished second to eighth and the first three clubs of the Amateurliga Berlin. The last winner of the Oberliga Berlin, Hertha BSC Berlin, was promoted to the new Bundesliga and the bottom two teams of the Oberliga were relegated to the Amateurliga. The Regionalliga Berlin was as such a continuation of the Oberliga Berlin under a different name and a tier lower.

Along with the Regionalliga Berlin went another four Regionalligas, these five formed the second tier of German football until 1974:

- Regionalliga West, covering the state of Nordrhein-Westfalen
- Regionalliga Süd, covering the state of Bayern, Hessen and Baden-Württemberg
- Regionalliga Nord, covering the states of Hamburg, Bremen, Niedersachsen and Schleswig-Holstein
- Regionalliga Südwest, covering the states of Rheinland-Pfalz and Saarland

The new Regionalligas were formed along the borders of the old post-World War II Oberligas, not after a balanced regional system. Therefore, the Oberligas Berlin and West covered small but populous areas while Nord and Süd covered large areas. Südwest was something of an anachronism, neither large nor populous.

The winners and runners-up of this league were admitted to the promotion play-off to the new Bundesliga, which was staged in two groups of originally four, later five teams each with the winner of each group going up.

The bottom team was relegated to the Amateurliga. Below the Regionalliga Berlin was the Amateurliga Berlin.

Tennis Borussia Berlin, SpVgg Blau-Weiß 1890 Berlin, Wacker 04 Berlin, Spandauer SV and Hertha Zehlendorf all played every season of the Regionalliga Berlin.

== Disbanding of the Regionalliga Berlin ==
The league was dissolved in 1974. Originally two clubs from the Regionalliga Berlin were to be integrated in the new 2. Bundesliga Nord, however, the Regionalliga champion Tennis Borussia Berlin won promotion to the Bundesliga and therefore only Wacker 04 Berlin was admitted into the new second division. The other ten teams in the league went to the new Oberliga Berlin.

== Winners and runners-up of the Regionalliga Berlin ==
The winners and runners-up of the league were:

**Season**	**Winner**	**Runner-Up**
1963–64	Tasmania 1900 Berlin	Tennis Borussia Berlin
1964–65	Tennis Borussia Berlin	Spandauer SV
1965–66	Hertha BSC Berlin	Tennis Borussia Berlin
1966–67	Hertha BSC Berlin	Tennis Borussia Berlin
1967–68	**Hertha BSC Berlin**	Tennis Borussia Berlin
1968–69	Hertha Zehlendorf	Tasmania 1900 Berlin
1969–70	Hertha Zehlendorf	Tennis Borussia Berlin
1970–71	Tasmania 1900 Berlin	Wacker 04 Berlin
1971–72	Wacker 04 Berlin	Tasmania 1900 Berlin
1972–73	Blau-Weiß 90 Berlin	Wacker 04 Berlin
1973–74	**Tennis Borussia Berlin**	Wacker 04 Berlin

- **Bold** denotes team went on to gain promotion to the Bundesliga.
- In 1965, SC Tasmania 1900 Berlin were promoted to Bundesliga even though they only finished third in the Regionalliga. This was because Hertha BSC was demoted from the Bundesliga for breach of rules, Tennis Borussia having failed in the promotion play–offs and Spandauer SV declining promotion. The German Football Association still wished to have a representative for Berlin in the league and elevated SC Tasmania 1900 Berlin instead.
- TeBe is the only team from Berlin to have won the old Regionalliga (1965, 1974) and the new one (1996, 1998).

== Placings in the Regionalliga Berlin 1963 to 1974 ==
The league placings from 1963 to 1974:

Club	64	65	66	67	68	69	70	71	72	73	74
Hertha BSC Berlin	B	B	1	1	1	B	B	B	B	B	B
SC Tasmania 1900 Berlin	1	3	B	4	5	2	3	1	2	4	
Tennis Borussia Berlin	2	1	2	2	2	3	2	4	4	3	1
Wacker 04 Berlin	3	4	4	6	4	4	5	2	1	2	2
SpVgg Blau-Weiß 1890 Berlin	5	7	10	11	8	10	4	3	3	1	3
Hertha Zehlendorf	6	8	5	5	3	1	1	5	6	5	4
SC Westend 01											5
Rapide Wedding				7	13	7	7	9	10	8	6
1. FC Neukölln			8	10	12	6	8	10	7	10	7
Berliner SV 1892	8	5	9	9	9	9	11		9	6	8
BBC Südost											9
Spandauer SV	4	2	3	3	7	5	6	6	5	7	10
BFC Preussen										9	11
Alemannia 90 Berlin					10	14		8	8	11	12
Rot-Weiß Neukölln										12	
TuS Wannsee							9	7	11		
Meteor 06 Berlin						12	13		12		
SC Staaken			6	15		11	10	11			
VfL Nord						15		12			
Kickers 1900 Berlin				14	14	8	12				
Sportfreunde Neukölln					15		14				
BFC Südring	9	6	7	12	6	13					
Reinickendorfer Füchse	7	10	11	13	11	16					
VfB Hermsdorf			12	8	16						
Lichterfelder SU			13	16							
SC Tegel			14								
SC Gatow			15								
Viktoria 89 Berlin		9	16								
Union 06 Berlin	10										

=== Key ===
Symbol	Key
B	Bundesliga
Place	League
Blank	Played at a league level below this league

=== Notes ===
- SC Tasmania 1900 Berlin went bankrupt in 1973 but reformed as SV Tasmania-Gropiusstadt 1973.
