= NOFV-Oberliga Mitte =

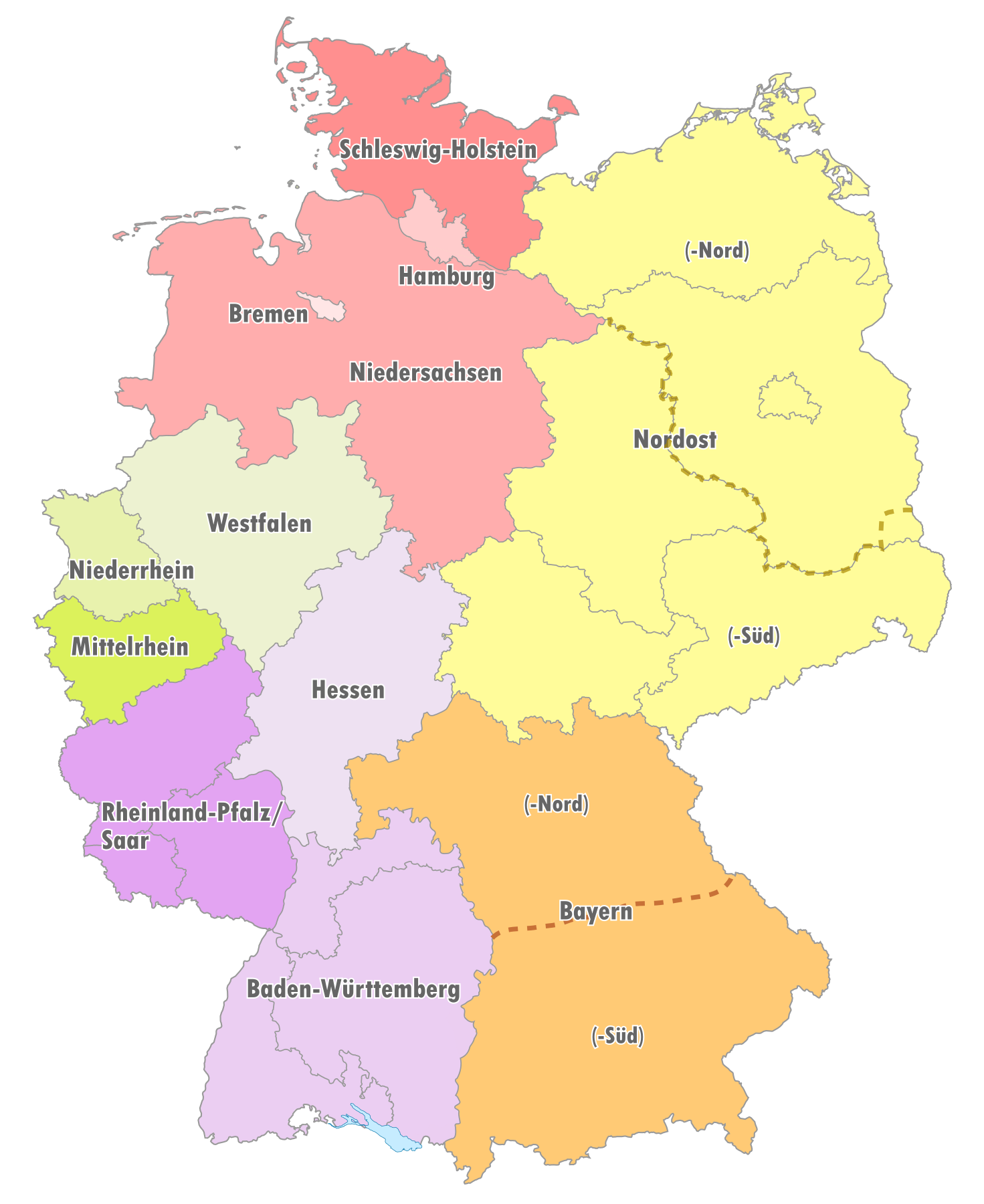
- Founded: 1991
- Folded: 1994
- Country: Germany
- States: Berlin; Brandenburg; Saxony-Anhalt
- Level on pyramid: Level 3
- Promotion to: 2. Bundesliga
- Relegation to: Berlin-Liga; Brandenburg-Liga; Verbandsliga Sachsen-Anhalt
- Last champions: 1. FC Union Berlin; (1993–94)
- Most championships: 1. FC Union Berlin; (3 titles - 100%)

The NOFV-Oberliga Mitte was the third tier of the German football league system in the central states of former East Germany and West Berlin. The league existed from 1991 to 1994. It covered the German states of Berlin, Brandenburg and Saxony-Anhalt.

== Overview ==
The NOFV-Oberliga Mitte was formed in 1991 when, along with the political reunion of Germany, the former East German football league system was integrated into the unified German system.

The abbreviation NOFV stands for Nordostdeutscher Fußballverband, meaning North East German Football Association.

Along with this league, two other NOFV-Oberligas were formed, the NOFV-Oberliga Nord and the NOFV-Oberliga Süd. Unlike the other two leagues who had 18 clubs, the Mitte-division started out with 20 clubs.

The league was formed from clubs from six different leagues: Two clubs from the Oberliga Nordost, the former DDR-Oberliga, six clubs from the NOFV-Liga A and B, the former East German second division, one club from the Bezirksliga East-Berlin, one of the regional leagues of the old East German third league level, one from the Verbandsliga Brandenburg, a new league, ten clubs from the Amateur-Oberliga Berlin, the West German third division for the city of Berlin, and two from the Landesliga Berlin, the old fourth division. The league accommodated therefore a wide mix of clubs from the east and west of Germany. It was also the first time since 1950 that clubs from East and West Berlin played in the same league.

The league became one of the then ten Oberligas in the united Germany, the third tier of league football. Its champion was however not directly promoted to the 2nd Bundesliga but had to take part in a promotion play-off. The 1. FC Union Berlin, the only team ever to win the league, failed in all three attempts to win promotion.

For the duration of the league the leagues below it were:

- Verbandsliga Berlin
- Verbandsliga Brandenburg
- Verbandsliga Sachsen-Anhalt

In the 1992–93 season, Hertha BSC II, playing in the NOFV-Oberliga Mitte, became the first third division club and the only Oberliga club so far to reach the DFB-Pokal final, losing to Bayer 04 Leverkusen 1–0.

In 1994, the German football league system saw some major changes. The four Regionalligas were introduced as an intermediate level between 2nd Bundesliga and Oberligas, relegating the Oberligas to fourth tier from now on. In the east of Germany, the Regionalliga Nordost was formed, a league covering the area of former East Germany and West-Berlin. Six clubs from the NOFV-Oberliga Mitte were admitted to the new league:

- 1. FC Union Berlin
- FC Energie Cottbus
- Türkiyemspor Berlin
- Lok Altmark Stendal
- Hertha BSC II
- Hertha Zehlendorf

The NOFV-Oberliga Mitte however was disbanded and its clubs, apart from the ones that went to the Regionalliga, were spread between the two remaining Oberligas in the east. Five of its clubs went to the NOFV-Oberliga Nord, four to the Süd-division. The last placed team, Frohnauer SC, was relegated to the Verbandsliga Berlin.

== League champions ==
The league champions:

Season	Club
1991–92	1. FC Union Berlin
1992–93	1. FC Union Berlin
1993–94	1. FC Union Berlin

== Placings and all-time table of the league ==
The complete list of clubs in the league and their final placings:

Club	1992	1993	1994	Games	GF	GA	Points
1. FC Union Berlin	1	1	1	100	307	55	177
FC Energie Cottbus	3	3	2	100	256	139	139
Türkiyemspor Berlin	6	4	3	100	185	106	130
Lok Altmark Stendal	4	7	4	100	177	119	129
Hertha BSC II	5	6	5	100	208	113	126
1. FC Magdeburg	2	8	7	100	210	147	126
Hertha Zehlendorf	10	5	6	100	182	142	117
VfB Lichterfelde	9	12	8	100	156	145	98
Anhalt Dessau	7	14	12	100	134	164	91
SCC Berlin	14	10	10	100	118	165	84
Türkspor Berlin	12	9	14	100	145	235	80
Hallescher FC	2B	2	9	62	132	83	78
FSV Glückauf Brieske-Senftenberg	11	13	13	100	118	184	78
SV Thale 04	8	17		70	65	111	56
Einheit Wernigerode		11	11	62	86	118	50
Marathon 02 Berlin	13	16		70	82	150	47
FSV Velten	15	N	N	38	51	77	30
Blau-Weiß 90 Berlin II	16			38	43	57	27
SC Gatow	17			38	43	72	26
FV Wannsee	18			38	41	75	24
1. FC Lübars		15		32	42	64	23
BSV Spindlersfeld	19			38	43	86	17
SV Merseburg 99	S		15	30	31	78	17
SV Lichtenberg 47	20			38	30	115	11
Frohnauer SC			16	30	17	81	7

- Two points for a win.

=== Key ===
Symbol	Key
2B	2. Bundesliga
N	Club played in the NOFV-Oberliga Nord
S	Club played in the NOFV-Oberliga Süd
1	League champions
Place	League
Blank	Played at a league level below this league

== Founding members of the league ==
The founding members of the league in 1991 were:

From the Oberliga Nordost:

- 1. FC Magdeburg
- FC Energie Cottbus

From the NOFV-Liga Staffel A:

- 1. FC Union Berlin
- 1. FC Lok Stendal
- FSV Glückauf Brieske-Senftenberg
- Rotation Berlin, became BSV Spindlersfeld, joined BSC Marzahn in 1995

From the NOFV-Liga Staffel B:

- Stahl Thale, became SV Thale 04, then Stahl Thale again
- Anhalt Dessau, now Vorwärts Dessau again

From the Verbandsliga Brandenburg:

- FSV Velten, now defunct

From the Bezirksliga Berlin (East):

- EAB Lichtenberg 47, now SV Lichtenberg 47

From the Amateur-Oberliga Berlin:

- Hertha BSC II
- Türkiyemspor Berlin
- VfB Lichterfelde, became Lichterfelder FC, now defunct
- Hertha Zehlendorf
- Marathon 02 Berlin, now defunct
- SCC Berlin
- Blau-Weiß 90 Berlin II, now defunct
- SC Gatow

From the Landesliga Berlin:

- Türkspor Berlin
- FV Wannsee
