= Marathon Berlin =

Marathon Berlin may refer to:

- NSC Marathon 02
- Berlin Marathon
