= CSV Afrisko 1897 =

German football club

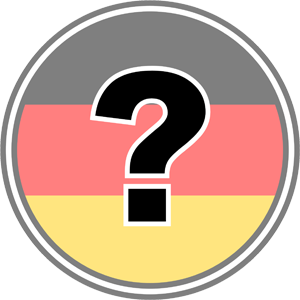
- Full name: Charlottenburger Sportverein Afrisko 1897 e.V.
- Founded: 1897
- Ground: Sportplatz Westend
- League: Kreisliga A Berlin (IX)
- 2015–16: Kreisliga B Berlin Staffel 3 (X), 2nd (promoted)
Home colours	Away colours

Charlottenburger Sportverein Afrisko 1897 is a German association football club from the district of Charlottenburg in the city of Berlin, formed following a 1992 merger with BFC Olympia 1953 Berlin. One of the city's earliest football clubs, SC des Westens 97 Berlin, is now part of CSV Afrisko.

== History ==
Sport-Club des Westens 97 Berlin was established 3 October 1897 and in 1902 was joined by Charlottenburger FC Triton 1898. The team was part of the Märkischer Fußball-Bund and enjoyed its greatest success in the 1908–09 season when they finished as runners-up to FC Tasmania 1900 Rixdorf in a season-ending match that went into several overtime periods before Tasmania won 4:3 after three hours of play.

On 22 June 1912, the club merged with Westender Fußball und Cricket Club Hamburg 1896 to form Sportliche Vereinigung des Westens 1897 Charlottenburg before readopting its original name on 1 July 1914. A forced merger under the Nazi regime in 1933 with Charlottenburger SC Sparta 08 saw the formation of Westliche Spielvereinigung 1897 Berlin. The club disappeared in the aftermath of World War II before being reformed later in 1945 as SG Spandauer Berg and again taking on its original name on 20 April 1947. Throughout this period, Westens played as a lower tier local side.

Westens came briefly to note with a two season long turn in the Amateurliga Berlin (III) in 1971–73. After finishing 15th in their debut season, they were relegated after a 17th-place result.

On 22 June 1979, the club joined with DJK SV Charlottenburg to form Charlottenburger SV 1897. DJK SV was first established on 20 June 1911, before disappearing in the Nazi purge of faith-based and workers' clubs in 1935. It was then newly reformed on 20 June 1950. Finally, on 8 May 1992, Charlottenburger fused with BFC Olympia 1953 Berlin to create present-day club Charlottenburger SV Olympia 97. Partner Olympia was established 1 August 1953 and within a month had joined Charlottenburger TSV 1858. On 2 July 1959, the club was independent again as BFC Olympia Berlin. In 2022, the club merged with 1. FC Afrisko and changed to its current name.

Today, Charlottenburger SV Olympia 1897 plays in the Kreisliga A Berlin after promotion from the Kreisliga B in 2016.
