= Berlin Cup =

Berliner Landespokal
- Organiser(s): Berlin Football Association
- Founded: 1906
- Region: Berlin, Germany
- Qualifier for: DFB-Pokal
- Current champions: VSG Altglienicke (2025–26)
- Most championships: Tennis Borussia Berlin (16 titles)

The Berliner Landespokal (English: Berlin Cup) is an annual football cup competition held by the Berlin Football Association (German: Berliner Fußballverband, BFV). The cup winner qualifies for the national DFB-Pokal. Cup finals are usually held in the Friedrich-Ludwig-Jahn-Sportpark. The competition has been held since 1906, with various interruptions. Record winners are Tennis Borussia Berlin with a total of 16 titles. It is one of the 21 regional cup competitions in Germany.

== Mode ==
All BFV teams that compete in regular leagues are eligible, as well as the winner of the "Freizeitpokal" (a competition for recreational football teams). Teams competing in the Fußball-Bundesliga and the 2. Fußball-Bundesliga are not allowed to compete. Starting with the 2007–08 season, only the first teams of every club may compete in the cup. There is a separate cup competition for the reserve teams.

The competition is held in a knock-out tournament format, with each round consisting of a single match. If scores are level, extra time will be played, and a penalty shootout follows, if necessary. Home field advantage is determined by the draw, clubs share the revenue from the match. In the final, revenue is shared equally between the finalists and the Berlin FA.

== 1906–1950: Berlin and Brandenburg Cup ==
=== History ===
Until 1931 the cup was played as "Berliner Verbandspokal" (Berlin Association Cup) in the Berlin-Brandenburg area. From 1932 to 1942 it was not held, because the national Tschammerpokal was introduced. Beginning with the 1943 edition it was re-introduced as the "Gaupokal Berlin-Brandenburg", its winner qualifying for the national cup competition. In the 1943–44 season, the Gaupokal was held, but the DFB-Pokal could not be held due to the Second World War. After the war ended and Berlin was divided in four sectors, the cup was held as "Pokal des amerikanischen Drahtfunks" (Cup of American Wire Radio) from 1946 to 1947, later renamed "RIAS-Pokal". Little had changed, with the notable exception that no Brandenburg clubs participated. From 1950, East Berlin clubs were no longer allowed to participate, they were incorporated into the East German football league system.

In the early years, the cup was dominated mostly by BFC Viktoria 1889 (initially under the name BTuFC Viktoria 1889). They managed to win the cup 5 times. But today's Bundesliga side Hertha BSC Berlin were able to capture the trophy five times as well.

=== Final results ===
Year	Winner	Finalist	Result
1907	BTuFC Viktoria 1889	Berliner BC 03	2–0
1908	BTuFC Viktoria 1889	BTuFC Union 1892	4–0
1909	BTuFC Viktoria 1889	Berliner BC 03	4–0
1910	Weißenseer FC	BSC Fortuna	4–1
1920	BFC Hertha 92	(Winner of a 14 team league)	
1923	SV Norden-Nordwest	BBC Brandenburg 92	2–0
1924	Hertha BSC	BV 06 Luckenwalde	1–0
1925	SV Norden-Nordwest	1. FC Neukölln	3–1
1926	BFC Viktoria 1889	Union Oberschöneweide	4–3
1927	BFC Viktoria 1889	SV Norden-Nordwest	6–2
1928	Hertha BSC	BV 06 Luckenwalde	9–2
1929	Hertha BSC	BFC Viktoria 1889	5–1
1930	Berliner SV 1892	Spandauer SV	5–1
1931	Tennis Borussia Berlin	SC Wacker 04 Berlin	6–0
1943	Hertha BSC	Tennis Borussia Berlin	4–3 AET
1944	Polizei Berlin	Tennis Borussia Berlin	6–2
1946	SG Wilmersdorf	SG Tempelhof	2–1 AET
1947	SG Oberschöneweide	SG Wilmersdorf	4–3 AET
1948	SG Oberschöneweide	Tennis Borussia Berlin	2–2 AET 3–1 (Replay)
1949	Tennis Borussia Berlin	Berliner FC Alemannia 1890	2–0

== 1950–1991: West Berlin Cup ==
=== History ===
With the creation of the West German and East German states in 1949 and the subsequent introduction of the DDR-Oberliga and the FDGB-Pokal a lot changed for the Berlin Cup. Beginning with the 1950–51 season, East Berlin teams had to participate in the GDR competitions and the Berlin Cup was held for West Berlin teams only.

From 1950 to 1970 the cup was held under the name "Karl-Heinz-Schulz-Pokal". Schulz was a sports journalist and coach. Among other things he had coached the German rowing eight at the 1936 Olympic Games. Aged 39, he died after complications following surgery.

In 1969 there was no cup winner, as the penalty shootout was not yet introduced and Hertha 03 Zehlendorf took their traditional world tour immediately after the match, so a replay match could not be scheduled.

In 1970 the cup was renamed "Paul-Rusch-Pokal". Paul Rusch had been made first president of the Berlin FA in 1949. He held that position until 1970. All non-professional sides that participated in the regular league competitions held by the Berlin FA. Since the 1957–58 season, the cup winner has qualified for the national cup competition, the DFB-Pokal.

=== Final results ===
Year	Winner	Finalist	Result
1950	SC Wacker 04 Berlin	Tennis Borussia Berlin	2–1 AET
1951	Tennis Borussia Berlin	SC Union 06 Berlin	2–1 AET
1952	SpVgg Blau-Weiß 1890 Berlin	SC Wacker 04 Berlin	3–0
1953	BFC Viktoria 1889	Berliner SV 1892	4–2
1954	Spandauer SV	Tennis Borussia Berlin	1–0
1955	Spandauer SV	SC Minerva 1893	2–1 AET
1956	Spandauer SV	SC Tasmania 1900 Berlin	2–2 and 1–1 AET
1957	SC Tasmania 1900 Berlin	Berliner SV 1892	3–1
1958	Hertha BSC	Spandauer SV	4–1
1959	Hertha BSC	SC Wacker 04 Berlin	5–2
1960	SC Tasmania 1900 Berlin	Tennis Borussia Berlin	3–0
1961	SC Tasmania 1900 Berlin	BFC Südring	3–0
1962	SC Tasmania 1900 Berlin	BFC Meteor 06	4–1
1963	SC Tasmania 1900 Berlin	SC Wacker 04 Berlin	2–1
1964	Tennis Borussia Berlin	Spandauer SV	2–2 AET 7–1 (Replay)
1965	Tennis Borussia Berlin	SC Wacker 04 Berlin	1–1 AET 3–2 (Replay)
1966	Hertha BSC	Tennis Borussia Berlin	6–3
1967	Hertha BSC	SC Tasmania 1900 Berlin	1–0
1968	SC Wacker 04 Berlin	FC Hertha 03 Zehlendorf	4–2
1969	no winner	Tennis Borussia Berlin; Hertha 03 Zehlendorf	1–1 AET
1970	SC Tasmania 1900 Berlin	Tennis Borussia Berlin	2–0
1971	SC Tasmania 1900 Berlin	SC Wacker 04 Berlin	4–2
1972	SC Wacker 04 Berlin	SpVgg Hellas-Nordwest 04	5–0
1973	Tennis Borussia Berlin	SpVgg Blau-Weiß 1890 Berlin	1–0
1974	Rapide Wedding	FC Hertha 03 Zehlendorf	5–3
1975	Spandauer SV	FC Hertha 03 Zehlendorf	4–1
1976	Hertha BSC Amateure	BFC Preussen	4–1
1977	FC Hertha 03 Zehlendorf	Traber FC Mariendorf	2–1
1978	Spandauer SV	BFC Preussen	2–1
1979	BFC Preussen	Reinickendorfer Füchse	5–3
1980	BFC Preussen	SC Wacker 04 Berlin	6–1
1981	BFC Preussen	Reinickendorfer Füchse	2–1
1982	FC Hertha 03 Zehlendorf	Rapide Wedding	3–1
1983	SC Charlottenburg	Tennis Borussia Berlin	3–2
1984	SpVgg Blau-Weiß 1890 Berlin	Lichterfelder Sport-Union 1951	3–1
1985	Tennis Borussia Berlin	SC Charlottenburg	1–0
1986	SC Charlottenburg	Spandauer SV	2–1
1987	Hertha BSC	Tennis Borussia Berlin	2–0
1988	Türkiyemspor Berlin	BFC Preussen	2–1 AET
1989	FC Hertha 03 Zehlendorf	Türkiyemspor Berlin	2–0
1990	Türkiyemspor Berlin	FC Hertha 03 Zehlendorf	2–1
1991	Türkiyemspor Berlin	NSC Marathon 02	3–0

== 1992 until today: Berlin Cup for all of Berlin ==
=== History ===
After German reunification in 1990 football competition in East and West Berlin were unified in the 1991–92 season. Since then only two teams from the former East Berlin has been able to win the cup. 1. FC Union Berlin won the cup in 1994 and 2007. BFC Dynamo won the cup for the first time 1999 and has gone on to win the cup several more times. Other teams from former East Berlin has been finalists, such as Köpenicker SC in 2007 and SV Lichtenberg 47 in 2013 and 2016. Köpenicker SC was founded in 1991 and thus never participated in the East German football league system, but is considered the successor of BSG Motor Köpenick.

The Paul Rusch Cup rarely attracted more than regional interest. But in 1992–93 the reserve of Hertha BSC attracted national interest when they reached the DFB-Pokal final after winning the Berlin Cup. In the final the team lost to Bayer Leverkusen. In 2001 two teams formed by immigrants faced each other for the first time in a German Regional Cup final. The Turkish derby between SV Yeşilyurt Berlin and Türkiyemspor Berlin generated international media interest and created for the first live broadcast of the Berlin Cup final by Turkish TV channel TRT-int.

In 2004 the competition was renamed again, bearing the name "ODDSET-Cup" until 2006. After a court decision this name could no longer be used and so the cup was held under the name "BFV-Pokal – unter der Schirmherrschaft von Lotto Berlin" (BFV-Cup – under the patronage of Lotto Berlin) or short "BFV-Pokal" (BFC-Cup), before it was renamed "Berliner-Pilsner-Pokal" (after a brand of beer) in 2007.

=== Final results ===
The respective league the teams competed in is referenced in brackets behind the team name:

- 3L: 3. Liga (since 2008)
- RL: Regionalliga Nordost (1994 until 2000) or Regionalliga Nord (since 2000)
- OL: NOFV-Oberliga Mitte (1991 until 1994) or NOFV-Oberliga Nord (since 1992)
- VL: Verbandsliga Berlin (Berlin-Liga)
- LL: Landesliga Berlin

Date	Winner	Runners-up	Result	Venue	Attendance
29 May 1992	Hertha BSC II (OL)	Reinickendorfer Füchse (OL)	1–0	Mommsenstadion	1,418
6 May 1993	Tennis Borussia Berlin (OL)	Türkiyemspor Berlin (OL)	2–0	Mommsenstadion	2,898
12 May 1994	1. FC Union Berlin (OL)	SD Croatia Berlin (LL)	2–1	Mommsenstadion	3,377
25 May 1995	Tennis Borussia Berlin (RL)	Türkiyemspor Berlin (RL)	5–0	Friedrich-Ludwig-Jahn-Sportpark	1,754
16 May 1996	Tennis Borussia Berlin (RL)	FC Hertha 03 Zehlendorf (RL)	2–0	Friedrich-Ludwig-Jahn-Sportpark	1,156
8 May 1997	Reinickendorfer Füchse (RL)	1. FC Union Berlin (RL)	1–0	Friedrich-Ludwig-Jahn-Sportpark	3,700
21 April 1998	Tennis Borussia Berlin (RL)	VfB Lichterfelde 1892 (OL)	2–0	Friedrich-Ludwig-Jahn-Sportpark	903
11 May 1999	BFC Dynamo (RL)	Türkspor Berlin (VL)	4–1	Friedrich-Ludwig-Jahn-Sportpark	1,888
31 May 2000	Tennis Borussia Berlin II (RL)	BFC Dynamo (RL)	2–0	Friedrich-Ludwig-Jahn-Sportpark	1,841
30 May 2001	SV Yeşilyurt Berlin (LL)	Türkiyemspor Berlin (OL)	2–1	Friedrich-Ludwig-Jahn-Sportpark	1,926
22 May 2002	Tennis Borussia Berlin (OL)	Reinickendorfer Füchse (OL)	4–0	Friedrich-Ludwig-Jahn-Sportpark	964
14 May 2003	Reinickendorfer Füchse (OL)	Tennis Borussia Berlin (OL)	1–0	Friedrich-Ludwig-Jahn-Sportpark	962
5 May 2004	Hertha BSC II (OL)	SV Yeşilyurt Berlin (OL)	3–0	Friedrich-Ludwig-Jahn-Sportpark	1,967
4 May 2005	Tennis Borussia Berlin (OL)	BFC Alemannia 90 Wacker (VL)	5–4 after penalties	Friedrich-Ludwig-Jahn-Sportpark	1,088
24 May 2006	Tennis Borussia Berlin (OL)	Hertha BSC II (RL)	2–1 AET	Friedrich-Ludwig-Jahn-Sportpark	1,600
16 May 2007	1. FC Union Berlin (RL)	Köpenicker SC (VL)	7–0	Stadion An der Alten Försterei	5,624
4 June 2008	Tennis Borussia Berlin (OL)	VfB Hermsdorf (VL)	2–0	Friedrich-Ludwig-Jahn-Sportpark	2,063
6 May 2009	1. FC Union Berlin (3L)	Tennis Borussia Berlin (OL)	2–1	Friedrich-Ludwig-Jahn-Sportpark	3,700
2 June 2010	Berliner AK 07 (OL)	BFC Dynamo (OL)	1–0	Friedrich-Ludwig-Jahn-Sportpark	3,100
8 June 2011	BFC Dynamo (OL)	SFC Stern 1900 (VL)	2–0	Friedrich-Ludwig-Jahn-Sportpark	5,100
26 May 2012	Berliner AK 07 (RL)	SC Gatow (VL)	2–0	Friedrich-Ludwig-Jahn-Sportpark	3,100
12 June 2013	BFC Dynamo (OL)	SV Lichtenberg 47 (OL)	1–0	Friedrich-Ludwig-Jahn-Sportpark	6,381
4 June 2014	FC Viktoria 1889 Berlin (RL)	SV Tasmania Berlin (LL)	2–1	Friedrich-Ludwig-Jahn-Sportpark	3,468
20 May 2015	BFC Dynamo (RL)	SV Tasmania Berlin (VL)	1–0	Friedrich-Ludwig-Jahn-Sportpark	6,914
28 May 2016	BFC Preussen (VL)	SV Lichtenberg 47 (OL)	1–0	Friedrich-Ludwig-Jahn-Sportpark	3,874
25 May 2017	BFC Dynamo (RL)	FC Viktoria 1889 Berlin (RL)	3–1	Friedrich-Ludwig-Jahn-Sportpark	6,690
21 May 2018	BFC Dynamo (RL)	Berliner Sport-Club (VL)	2–1	Friedrich-Ludwig-Jahn-Sportpark	6,428
25 May 2019	FC Viktoria 1889 Berlin (RL)	Tennis Borussia Berlin (OL)	1–0	Friedrich-Ludwig-Jahn-Sportpark	2,712
22 August 2020	VSG Altglienicke (RL)	FC Viktoria 1889 Berlin (RL)	6–0	Friedrich-Ludwig-Jahn-Sportpark	0
29 May 2021	BFC Dynamo (RL)	Berliner AK 07 (RL)	2–1	Mommsenstadion	0
21 May 2022	FC Viktoria 1889 Berlin (3L)	VSG Altglienicke (RL)	2–1	Mommsenstadion	1,215
3 June 2023	Makkabi Berlin (OL)	Sparta Lichtenberg (VL)	3–1 AET	Mommsenstadion	4,673
25 May 2024	FC Viktoria 1889 Berlin (RL)	Makkabi Berlin (OL)	3–0	Hans-Zoschke-Stadion	2,739
24 May 2025	BFC Dynamo (RL)	Eintracht Mahlsdorf (OL)	2–0	Mommsenstadion	8,400
23 May 2026	VSG Altglienicke (RL)	BFC Dynamo (RL)	2–1 AET	Mommsenstadion	

== Winners ==
Rank	Club	Titles	Years won
1	Tennis Borussia Berlin	16	1931, 1949, 1951, 1964, 1965, 1973, 1985, 1993, 1995, 1996, 1998, 2000, 2002, 2005, 2006, 2008
2	Hertha BSC	13	1920, 1924, 1928, 1929, 1943, 1958, 1959, 1966, 1967, 1976, 1987, 1992, 2004
3	FC Viktoria 1889 Berlin	10	1907 (Note: Won by BTuFC Viktoria 89/BFC Viktoria 1889.), 1908, 1909, 1926, 1927, 1953, 2014, 2019, 2022, 2024
4	BFC Dynamo	8	1999, 2011, 2013, 2015, 2017, 2018, 2021, 2025
5	SC Tasmania 1900 Berlin	7	1957, 1960, 1961, 1962, 1963, 1970, 1971
6	Spandauer SV	5	1954, 1955, 1956, 1975, 1978
7	1. FC Union Berlin	5	1947 (Note: Won by SG Oberschöneweide.), 1948, 1994, 2007, 2009
8	BFC Preussen	4	1979, 1980, 1981, 2016
9	SC Wacker 04 Berlin	3	1950, 1968, 1972
10	Hertha Zehlendorf	3	1977, 1982, 1989
11	Türkiyemspor Berlin	3	1988, 1990, 1991
12	SV Norden-Nordwest	2	1923, 1925
13	Berliner SV 1892	2	1930, 1946
14	SpVgg Blau-Weiß 1890 Berlin	2	1952, 1984
15	SC Charlottenburg	2	1983, 1986
16	Reinickendorfer Füchse	2	1997, 2003
17	Berliner AK 07	2	2010, 2012
18	VSG Altglienicke	2	2020, 2026
19	Weißenseer FC	1	1910
20	Polizei SV Berlin	1	1944
21	Rapide Wedding	1	1974
22	SV Yeşilyurt	1	2001
23	Makkabi Berlin	1	2023
