= Heinz-Ludwig Schmidt =

German football manager

Personal information
- Full name: Heinz-Ludwig Schmidt
- Date of birth: 2 March 1920
- Place of birth: German Reich
- Date of death: 15 August 2008 (aged 88)

Managerial career
- Years: Team
- 1958–1962: Tennis Borussia Berlin
- 1963–1964: SpVgg Blau-Weiß 1890 Berlin
- 1965–1968: SC Tasmania 1900 Berlin

Heinz-Ludwig Schmidt (2 March 1920 – 15 August 2008) was a German football manager.

Schmidt coached SC Tasmania 1900 Berlin during the 1965–66 Bundesliga season.
