= BSC Rehberge Berlin =

German football club

- Rehberge Berlin club logo
- Full name: Berliner Sport-Club Rehberge 1945 e.V.
- Founded: 1945
- League: Landesliga Berlin Staffel 2 (VII)
- 2015–16: 12th
Home colours	Away colours

Rehberge Berlin is a German association football club from the city of Berlin. It was established in the aftermath of World War II on 1 June 1945 as Sportgruppe Rehberge Berlin and formed a football department on 11 August 1945 when joined by the former memberships of Berliner Fußball-Club Colombia 1935 and Sportverein Helios 1919 Berlin.

== History ==
On 3 April 1947, SG was renamed BFC Rehberge Berlin and on 5 October 1951 merged with Sportclub Rehberge, which was established just two years earlier in June 1949. Through the 1950s, the Rehberge side was part of the Amateurliga Berlin (II) where they enjoyed their best seasons in 1953–55 when they earned a pair of 4th-place results. They have largely remained a lower circuit club, re-appearing in Amateurliga play fewer than a handful of times.

A third-place finish in the Bezirksliga in 2015 earned the club promotion to the tier seven Landesliga Berlin.

Today the club has departments for athletics, badminton, chess, handball, lacrosse, table tennis, and tennis.

== Stadium ==
Rehberge play their home matches at the Hauptkampfbahn Volkspark Rehberge.
