= NSC Marathon 02 =

Defunct German football club

- Full name: Neuköllner Sport Club Marathon 02
- Founded: 1902
- Dissolved: 2022
- Ground: Hertzbergplatz
- Capacity: 2,500
Home colours	Away colours

Neuköllner Sport Club Marathon 02 was a German association football club from the Neukölln district of Berlin.

== History ==
The club was established as Neuköllner Athletic Club Marathon through the merger of predecessor sides Berliner Turn- und Fußball Club Hohenzollern 1890 and Sport Club Arminia-Urania Rixdorf on 20 July 1902. They played as Rixdorfer Athletik-SC Marathon 1902 before adopting the name Neuköllner Athletik-SC Marathon on 27 January 1912. A merger with Fußball Club 1921 Neukölln on 26 March 1926 created Neuköllner Sportclub Marathon.

NSC was an undistinguished side prior to World War II and briefly disappeared after the war when occupying Allied authorities banned organizations throughout the country, including sports and football clubs, as part of the process of de-Nazification. Marathon was re-formed on 25 November 1950 and took part in lower-tier play in West Berlin. In 1959, they won promotion to the Amateurliga Berlin (III) for a single season.

The team returned to higher-level football in 1989 after winning the championship in their first season of play in the Landesliga Berlin (V). They advanced to the Oberliga Berlin (III), which became the NOFV-Oberliga Mitte (III) in 1991 after the reunification of Germany. They struggled there until being sent down in 1993 after three seasons.

Their 1990 Landesliga title earned Marathon a place in the Berliner Pokal (Berlin Cup) in 1991, and they advanced to the final which they lost 0–3 to Türkiyemspor Berlin. That performance earned them a place in the opening round of the 1992 DFB-Pokal (German Cup) where they were put out 0–7 by eventual cup winners and Bundesliga (I) side Hannover 96.

Through the 1990s, NSC was largely a mid-table side in the Verbandsliga Berlin (VI) until slipping in 2001 and descending to the Kreisliga B Berlin (IX) where they played for seven seasons after 2015.

At the end of May 2022 NSC's merger with 1. FC Novi Pazar 95, formerly 1. FC Neukölln, to become 1. FC Novi Pazar/Marathon 1895 was made known for the 2022–23 season.

== Honours ==
The club's honours:

- Landesliga Berlin (V)
  - Champions: 1990
- Berliner Landespokal
  - Runners-up: 1991
