= BBC Südost =

German football club

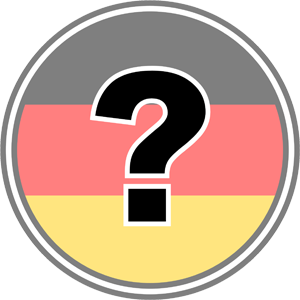
- Full name: Berliner Ballspiel-Club Südost 1950 e.V.
- Founded: 1950
- Dissolved: 1990
- Ground: Wrangelstraße
- Capacity: 3,000
| Home colours | Away colours |

BBC Südost was a German football club from the district of Kreuzberg in Berlin. Established on 18 January 1950 and active until 1990, BBC was formed out of the football department of parent club Turn- und Sport Südost Berlin.

== History ==
The team was made up of former members and players of the club SG Union Oberschöneweide, predecessor of current-day club 1. FC Union Berlin, who left the Soviet-occupied eastern half of the city when clubs located there were denied the opportunity to take part in citywide and national championships and were instead made part of the separate football competition that was emerging in East Germany. Originally based in the Poststadion in Moabit, the club soon took up residence at Wrangelstraße to better accommodate club members living in Kreuzberg and Köpenick.

The team first advanced to the Amateurliga Berlin (II) in 1954 for a three-season turn. They were absent from upper level play through the 1960s until returning to now third tier Amateurliga play in 1969. They delivered their best performances in the early 1970s when the side included a number of former players from one time Bundesliga (I) club Tasmania Berlin, who were nearing the end of their careers. The team captured the Amateurliga title in 1973 and won promotion to the Regionalliga Berlin (II). That title also earned BBC a place in the opening round of the national amateur championship where they were put out (1–4, 1–1) by Büdelsdorfer TSV.

The team's Regionalliga season ended with a 9th-place finish and relegation. After two poor Amateurliga campaigns, Südost slipped out of sight into lower level play before being disbanded in 1990.

== Honours ==
The club's honours:

- Amateurliga Berlin (III)
  - Champions: 1973

== Stadium ==
BBC Südost played its home fixtures at Wrangelstraße (3,000).
