= Berlin Türkspor 1965 =

German football club

Türkspor Berlin
- Full name: Berlin Tührkspor e.V. 1965
- Founded: 1965
- Ground: Sportanlage Jungfernheide
- Capacity: 1,000
- League: Berlin-Liga (VI)
- 2021–22: 14th
Home colours	Away colours

Türkspor Berlin is a German association football club from the city of Berlin.

== History ==
Formed as an ethnically Turkish sports club in 1965, the team won its way into the Landesliga Berlin (IV) in 1989 before going on to spend three seasons (1991–94) as a lower-tier side in third division play in the Oberliga Nordost-Mitte where their best result came as a 9th-place finish in 1992–93. Following league reorganization in 1994, the Oberliga was reduced to two divisions and Türkspor was moved to the Oberliga Nordost-Nord (IV) where the club played just one season before they were relegated after finishing 15th. Türkspor spent the rest of the 1990s moving up and down between Verbandsliga and Landesliga play before finally slipping into lower-level competition. For 2016–17 the club restarted their senior team in the Kreisliga C Berlin (XI) after not playing in the league for three years. In December 2017, Türkspor merged with SpVgg Hellas-Nordwest 04 and continued under the current name, replacing the latter's position in the Berlin-Liga (VI).

A high point of the club's history was their advance to the final of the Berliner Landespokal (Berlin Cup) in 1999 where they were beaten 1–4 by BFC Dynamo.

== Honours ==
The club's honours:

- Berliner Landespokal
  - Runners-up: 1999
