= Berlin-Liga =

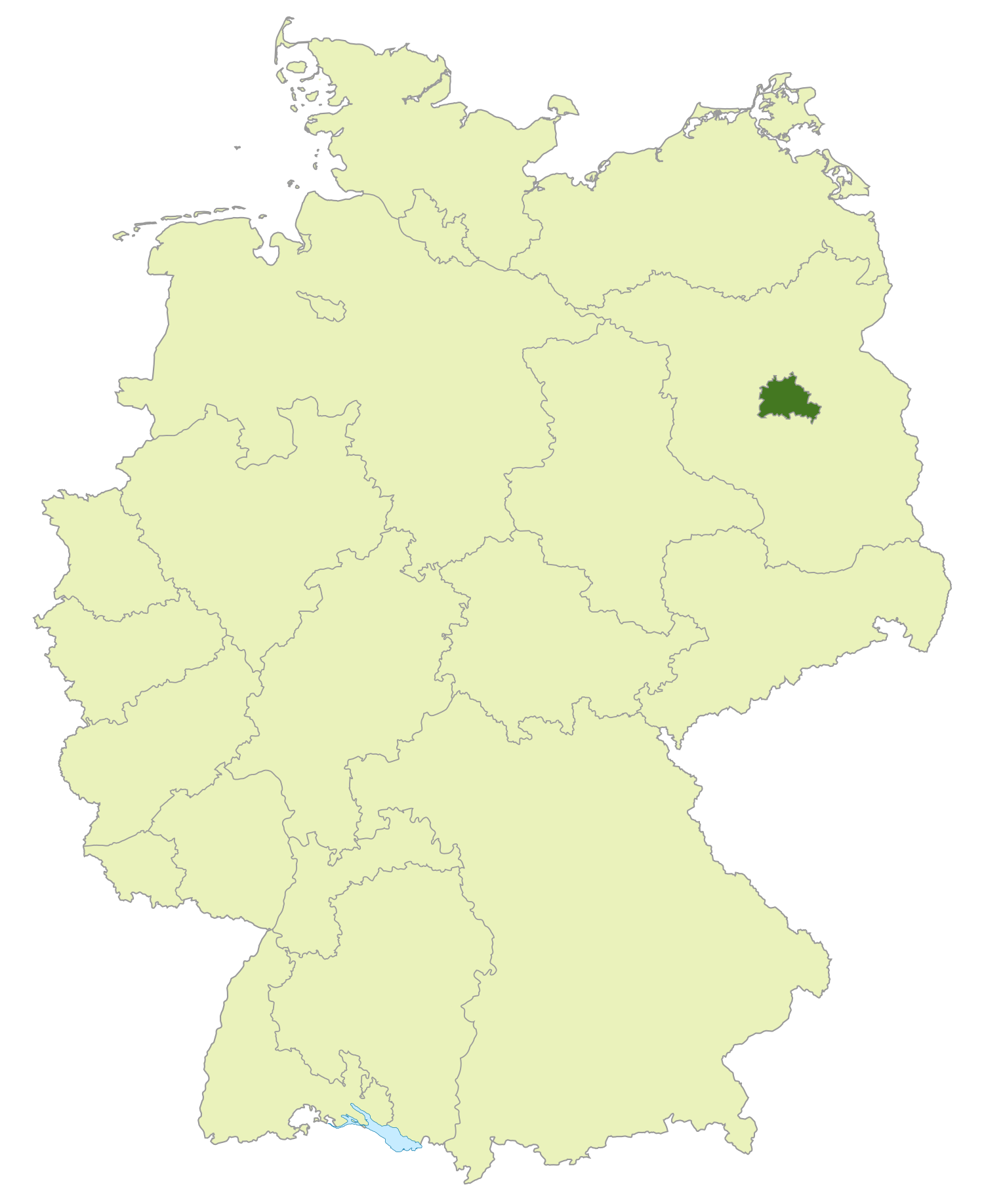
- Founded: 1992
- Country: Germany
- State: Berlin
- Number of clubs: 18
- Level on pyramid: Level 6
- Promotion to: NOFV-Oberliga Nord
- Relegation to: Landesliga Berlin Staffel 1; Landesliga Berlin Staffel 2
- Domestic cup: Berliner Landespokal
- Current champions: Füchse Berlin Reinickendorf (2025–26)

The Berlin-Liga (VI), formerly the Verbandsliga Berlin, is the highest league for football teams exclusively in the German capital. Since German reunification in 1990, it has been the highest level of domestic football in the city, replacing the Amateur-Oberliga Berlin in this position. After the 2007–08 season the Verbandsliga was renamed Berlin-Liga.

It is the sixth tier of the German football league system. Until the introduction of the 3. Liga in 2008 it was the fifth tier of the league system; until the introduction of the Regionalligen in 1994 the fourth tier.

== Overview ==
The Berlin-Liga was formed in 1992 as the Verbandsliga Berlin from sixteen clubs in West and East Berlin. It was the first time since 1950, when the East Berlin sides left the Oberliga Berlin to play in the East German football league system, that clubs from both halves of the city played in the same Berlin-wide league. It replaced the Landesliga Berlin as the fourth tier of the German league system in Berlin; the Landesliga had in the previous season been expanded to two divisions to integrate the clubs from East Berlin.

In the 1992–93 season, the league winner was promoted to the NOFV-Oberliga Mitte; since then the winner of the league each year has been promoted to the NOFV-Oberliga Nord, together with the winners of the Brandenburg-Liga and the Verbandsliga Mecklenburg-Vorpommern, while the relegated teams go to the Landesliga Berlin Staffel 1 and Landesliga Berlin Staffel 2.

== Founding members of the league ==
The Verbandsliga was formed in 1992 from sixteen clubs from four leagues, these clubs being:

From the NOFV-Oberliga Mitte:

- SC Gatow
- SV Lichtenberg 47
- BSV Spindlersfeld, became BSV Marzahn
- FV Wannsee

From the NOFV-Oberliga Nord:

- BFC Preussen
- Wacker 04 Berlin

From the Landesliga Berlin-Staffel I:

- 1. FC Wilmersdorf
- SC Staaken
- Köpenicker SC
- Frohnauer SC
- SC Rapide Wedding

From the Landesliga Berlin-Staffel II:

- SC Schwarz Weiss Spandau
- Spandauer SC Teutonia
- SV Tasmania 73 Neukölln
- FC Wacker Lankwitz
- SG Eumako Weißensee, became Weißenseer FC

== League champions ==
The league champions:

Season	Champions
1992–93	Frohnauer SC
1993–94	1. FC Wilmersdorf
1994–95	Köpenicker SC
1995–96	SD Croatia Berlin
1996–97	SV Tasmania 73 Neukölln
1997–98	Tennis Borussia Berlin II
1998–99	Berliner AK 07
1999–2000	Türkiyemspor Berlin
2000–01	SV Lichtenberg 47
2001–02	Köpenicker SC
2002–03	SV Yeşilyurt
2003–04	BFC Dynamo
2004–05	BFC Preussen
2005–06	Lichterfelder FC
2006–07	Spandauer SV
2007–08	Reinickendorfer Füchse
2008–09	Lichtenrader BC
2009–10	1. FC Union Berlin II
2010–11	BFC Viktoria 1889
2011–12	VSG Altglienicke
2012–13	BSV Hürtürkel
2013–14	Hertha Zehlendorf
2014–15	Tennis Borussia Berlin
2015–16	VSG Altglienicke
2016–17	SC Staaken
2017–18	SpVg Blau-Weiß 90 Berlin
2018–19	SV Tasmania Berlin
2019–20	SFC Stern 1900
2020–21	Eintracht Mahlsdorf
2021–22	TuS Makkabi Berlin
2022–23	SV Sparta Lichtenberg
2023–24	BFC Preussen
2024–25	SD Croatia Berlin
2025–26	TuS Makkabi Berlin
