= FC Spandau 06 =

German football club

- Full name: Fußball Club 1906 Spandau e.V.
- Founded: 1 July 2003
- Ground: Stadion am Ziegelhof
- Capacity: 3,000
- Chairman: Rüdiger Bienert
- Manager: Ralf Kähne
- League: Landesliga Berlin (VIII)
- 2015–16: Bezirksliga Berlin Staffel 1 (VIII), 2nd (promoted)
| Home colours | Away colours |

FC Spandau 06 is a German football club based in the Spandau district of Berlin. The club was formed out of the 2003 merger of the traditional side Spandauer Ballclub 1906 and newcomer 1. FC Spandau which was established in 1997.

== History ==
=== Spandauer Ballspielclub 1906 ===
Spandauer BC was originally formed as SC Britannia Spandau. In 1919, following World War I, they merged with Borussia Spandau to play as Hertha Spandau until 1923 when they once again became SBC. The team enjoyed a short turn in the top-flight Oberliga Berlin-Brandenburg in 1932–33, but did not become part of the new Gauliga Berlin (I) after the re-organization of German football under the Third Reich the following season.

After World War II occupying Allied authorities ordered the disbanding of most organizations in the country, including sports and football associations. In late 1945 the memberships of several pre-war clubs within the district were organized as a Sportgruppe (sports group) from which SBC emerged in 1953.

The club was promoted out of lower-league city play into the Amateurliga Berlin (IV) in 1967 and played fourth- and fifth-tier football until the late 70s, when they were elevated into the Oberliga Berlin (III) through league re-organization and signing some British players amongst them Paul McGaffney who had earlier been with Te Be Berlin in the 2nd Bundesliga. SBC played at that level until 1993, never managing better than a 6th-place finish. Another league re-organization pushed them down through fourth division into fifth-tier play in the Verbandsliga Berlin (V) until they were again relegated in 2002 to the Landesliga Berlin-1 (VI).

=== 1. FC Spandau ===
1. FC Spandau was founded in 1997 as an initiative of district mayor, Werner Salomon, who hoped to bring together the district's traditional clubs, including SBC, Spandauer SV, and Spandau SC as a single association with the goal of becoming Berlin's number three football power after Hertha Berlin and 1. FC Union Berlin. That ambition was never realized. By 1999 only Ruhlebener SC had answered the call and the new club was in financial crisis, eventually leading to 1. FC joining SBC in 2003.

The newly combined side steadily improved over the next few seasons and after a Landesliga Berlin (VI) championship in 2006 played as high as the Verbandsliga Berlin (V) but have since fallen to the tier eight Bezirksliga. A runners-up finish at this level in 2015–16 took the club back up to the Landesliga.

They play their home matches in Sportplatz Ziegelhof which was built in 1951 and has a capacity of 3,000 (300 seats).
