= SCC Berlin =

German sports club

Sport-Club Charlottenburg e.V.
- Full name: Sport-Club Charlottenburg e.V.
- Founded: 1902
- Ground: Mommsenstadion
- Capacity: 15,005
- Chairman: Nicolas Wolff
- Trainers: Bernd Upmeier; Goran Ilić
- League: Berlin-Liga (VI)
- 2019–20: Landesliga Berlin (VII), 1st (promoted)
Home colours	Away colours

SC Charlottenburg (also known as SCC Berlin) is a German sports club based in the Charlottenburg district of Berlin and founded in 1902 as Charlottenburger Sport-Club 1902. In 1911, they merged with Sport-Club Westen 05 and changed their club colors from yellow and blue to black and white.

The club is known for its football section who played in 2. Bundesliga in 1983–84, its athletics section that organises among others the Berlin Marathon, and its men's volleyball (Berlin Recycling Volleys) and American football (Berlin Rebels) teams, both of whom play in the top divisions of their sports.

== Football ==
Through the early 1920s the club went through other mergers and played football in the Oberliga Berlin-Brandenburg (I) as Union-SCC Charlottenburg – through its association with FC Union Halensee (1898) – with their best result coming in 1922 when they finished as vice-champions after losing a two-game final to Norden-Nordwest Berlin (2–4, 0–1). The club changed its name to SC Charlottenburg in 1927 and was relegated that same year. SCC returned to the Oberliga for a single season in 1928–29.

Charlottenburg played lower-tier football throughout the 1930s and most of the 1940s. After World War II it was one of a number of sides that was part of a single association known as SG Charlottenburg representing the district. The combined side re-appeared in the top flight in the Oberliga Berlin in 1946, promptly capturing the division title.

SG Charlottenburg soon began to break up into its original separate clubs and in 1949 SC Charlottenburg re-emerged to play third-tier football. They were promoted to the Amateurliga Berlin in 1950 for a three-season turn before being relegated. In 1963, the same year that the Bundesliga, Germany's new professional league, was formed, SCC made a single season appearance in the Amateurliga before slipping from sight into lower division play.

Charlottenburg enjoyed a brief resurgence in the early 1980s, rising quickly through the Landesliga Berlin (IV) and the Amateur Oberliga Berlin (III) to play the 1983–84 season in the 2. Bundesliga. That campaign ended in the failure of an 18th-place finish and relegation. The team remained competitive, earning a second-place result in the Oberliga in 1985 and another title in 1986. SCC took part in the subsequent promotion round for 2. Bundesliga play, but finished behind FC St. Pauli and Rot-Weiss Essen, before crashing disastrously to a last-place finish the following season. The club competed in the third and fourth division through the balance of the 1980s and well on into the 1990s before finally slipping to the fifth tier Berlin-Liga and Landesliga Berlin. A runners-up finish in the latter in 2015 took the club back up to the Berlin-Liga but it was relegated back to the Landesliga in 2016.

=== Honours ===
The club's honours:

- Landesliga Berlin
  - Champions (IV): 1982
- Oberliga Berlin (II/III)
  - Champions: 1947, 1983, 1986
- Oberliga Berlin-Brandenburg
  - Runners-up: 1921
- Berliner Landespokal
  - Winners: 1983, 1986
  - Runners-up: 1985

== Volleyball ==
A men's volleyball section was established at SCC when the section from Bundesliga club VdS Berlin joined in 1989. Two years later the section merged with the one from East Berlin's SC Berlin (former SC Dynamo Berlin). The team played as SCC Berlin until 2011 and as Berlin Recycling Volleys since then.

Together with VfB Friedrichshafen they are the most successful team in German men's volleyball, having won 12 championships and 6 German cups.

== Other activities ==
Today one of Berlin's largest sports clubs, SCC offers a wide variety of activities to its membership including American football (Berlin Rebels), baseball and softball, basketball, handball, ice hockey, field hockey, athletics, tennis, swimming, and volleyball.

== Stadium ==
The football and American football sides play their home matches at the Mommsenstadion (capacity: 15,005) which was built in 1930 and known originally as SCC-Stadion. Today it is owned by the State of Berlin, and shared with Tennis Borussia Berlin.

== See also ==
- Berlin derby
