= SV Lichtenberg 47 =

- Full name: Sportverein Lichtenberg 47 e.V.
- Founded: 26 April 1947; 79 years ago
- Ground: Hans-Zoschke-Stadion
- Capacity: 10,000
- League: Oberliga NOFV-Nord (V)
- 2025–26: Oberliga NOFV-Nord, 2nd of 16
Home colours	Away colours

SV Lichtenberg 47 is a German association football club from Berlin. The footballers are part of a larger sports club that currently has over 900 members in departments for bowling, boxing, fitness and aerobics, gymnastics, line dancing, table tennis, and volleyball.

== History ==
DDR era logos of BSG EAB 47 Berlin c. 1979–90 and BSG EAB 47 Lichtenberg c. 1969–78

The club was established in 1945 as Sportgruppe Lichtenberg-Nord in Russian-occupied East Berlin. It was one of several sides from the district of Lichtenberg that were brought together in 1947 to form Sportclub Lichtenberg 47. The team would play as SC Lichtenberg 47 until 1950 when the club was renamed Sportgemeinschaft Lichtenberg 47. The team would play as SG Lichtenberg 47 until 1969 when the club merged with the worker's club Betriebssportgemeinschaft Elektroproject und Anlagebau Berlin to form BSG EAB Lichtenberg. In 1979 the association was renamed BSG EAB Berlin 47.

The club spent over four decades as an elevator side that moved frequently up and down between the second and third tiers of East German football with only a single season (1950–51) in the top-flight to its credit.

After German reunification in 1990 and the subsequent merger of the football leagues of the two Germanys, the club adopted the name Sportverein Lichtenberg and took up play in the NOFV-Oberliga Mitte (III). A poor season saw the team relegated to the Verbandsliga Berlin (IV) and by the mid-1990s they had descended to the Landesliga Berlin (VI). SV Lichtenberg 47 recovered itself in the latter half of the decade and in 2001 captured the championship in what was now the fifth tier Verbandsliga Berlin. The team spent four seasons in the NOFV-Oberliga Nord (IV) until returning in 2005 to the Berlin-Liga (V until 2008). In 2012 they were promoted back to the Oberliga (V) They played in the Oberliga until 2019, when they were promoted to the Regionalliga Nordost (IV) after winning the Oberliga championship.

== Stadium ==
SV Lichtenberg 47 play their home matches in the Hans-Zoschke-Stadion which has a capacity of 10,000 (1,000 seats). It was built in 1951 on the site of the old Sportplatz Normannenstraße which had a capacity of 18,000.

Named after Hans Zoschke, an athlete and communist resistance fighter who died at the hands of the Nazi regime in 1944, the stadium was adjacent to the headquarters of the Stasi, East Germany's state police. Local lore has it that Stasi boss Erich Mielke ordered the building torn down after witnessing the close defeat of his favourite club, BFC Dynamo, from an office window. The building was saved when Zoschke's widow Elfried appealed to Communist party boss Erich Honecker.

== Honours ==
- 1. Klasse Berlin (III)
  - Champions: 1948
- Kreisliga Berlin (III)
  - Champions: 1950
- Bezirksliga Berlin (III)
  - Champions (8): 1955, 1964, 1970, 1971, 1981, 1983, 1990, 1991
- Landesliga Berlin (VI)
  - Champions: 1996
- Verbandsliga Berlin (V)
  - Champions: 2001
- NOFV-Oberliga (V)
  - Champions: 2019
- Berliner Landespokal
  - Runners-up: 2013, 2016
