= BFC Südring =

German football club

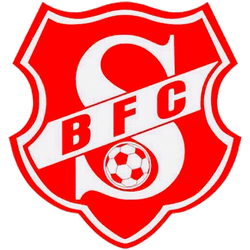
- Full name: Berliner Fußball-Club Südring e.V.
- Founded: 15 June 1935
- Ground: Stadion an der Lobeckstraße
- Capacity: 3,000
- League: Bezirksliga Berlin (VIII)
- 2015–16: Kreisliga A Berlin Staffel 2 (IX), 1st (promoted)
Home colours	Away colours

BFC Südring is a German football club from the city of Berlin. The club was formed on 15 June 1935 as Sportclub Südring Berlin out of the membership of Spielvereinigung Fichte Berlin, a worker's club that was banned in 1933 under the politically motivated policies of the Third Reich, which saw the dissolution of left-leaning worker's clubs like Fichte as well as clubs with religious affiliations.

== History ==
Südring spent the earliest decades of its existence in local city competition. At the end of World War II in 1945, occupying Allied authorities banned organizations throughout the country, including sports and football clubs. Later in 1945, the club was reorganized as Sportgruppe Südring Berlin and they were part of the short-lived postwar Stadtliga Berlin where they earned a third-place finish in the league's Staffel B. That result was good enough for the club to remain part of first division play in the re-constituted Oberliga Berlin (I). In 1947, they were able to re-adopt their historical identity as SC Südring.

Südring broke up into two separate clubs in 1950 with the formation of Berliner Fußball-Club Eintracht which was later known as Berliner Sportclub Eintracht/Südring. Following the split, parent club Sportclub Südring took on the name Fußball-Club Südring. Through the 1950s, the team bounced back and forth between the Oberliga Berlin (I) and the Amateurliga Berlin (II). After taking the Amateurliga title in 1956, Südring took part in national amateur championship play, defeating SV Niederlahnstein 2–1 in the opening round before going out 0–5 to eventual champions SpVgg 03 Neu-Isenburg in their semifinal match up.

Following the formation of Germany's new first division Bundesliga in 1963, BFC Südring became part of the Regionalliga Berlin (II) after beating SC Gatow (1–1, 2–0) in qualifying play. They remained part of the Regionalliga as a middling side until being relegated to Amateurliga (III) play in 1969 following a 13th-place result, where they would remain until slipping into lower-level competition in 1975.

== Honours ==
The club's honours:

- Amateurliga Berlin (II)
  - Champions: 1956
- Berliner Landespokal
  - Runners-up: 1961

== Stadium ==
Between 1945 and 1952, BFC Südring played at Züllichauer Straße before moving to the Katzbachstadion. They now play at the Stadion an der Lobeckstraße.
