= Wacker 04 Berlin =

German football club

- Full name: Sport-Club Wacker 04 Berlin e.V.
- Founded: 25 July 1904
- Dissolved: 1994
- Ground: Wackerplatz
- Capacity: 5,000
- League: defunct
Home colours	Away colours

Wacker 04 Berlin was a German football club based in Berlin. The club folded in 1994 after becoming insolvent.

Wacker played at the highest level in Berlin for many years throughout its history, in the Oberliga Berlin-Brandenburg, the Gauliga Berlin-Brandenburg from 1933 onwards and, finally, the Oberliga Berlin. After the Introduction of the Bundesliga in 1963 Wacker dropped to the second tier Regionalliga Berlin. From 1971 to 1974 the club unsuccessfully took part in the promotion round to the Bundesliga on four occasions. The club became a founding member of the 2. Bundesliga in 1974 but dropped out of the league and professional football in 1979.

Wacker also had taken part in the DFB-Pokal, the German Cup, on a number of occasions, advancing to the second round in 1937, 1976–77, 1977–78 and 1979–80.

== History ==
Wacker was founded 25 July 1904 as Reinickendorfer FC West and in 1908 merged with Tegeler FC Hohenzollern 1905 to form SC Wacker 04 Tegel. The club played in the top-flight Oberliga Berlin-Brandenburg through the 1920s, remaining a solid mid-table side throughout the years, never claiming a title of their own, but also never being relegated. Wacker remained in the top-flight, joining the Gauliga Berlin-Brandenburg (I) following the reorganization of German football under the Third Reich in 1933, but were immediately relegated. They returned after a single season absence, were sent down for the 1939–40 season, and after again being promoted in 1940, played in the first division until the end of the war.

Through the 1930s Wacker made a number of cup appearances. They were beaten 6–0 by Tennis Borussia Berlin in the final of the Berliner Landespokal in 1931 and made three appearances in the Tschammerspokal, predecessor to today's DFB-Pokal.

After the end of the war in 1945, Wacker resumed first division play in the Oberliga Berlin, initially as SG Reickendorf-West, but were sent down after a last place finish in 1956. They returned to the Oberliga a season later and stayed in first division football until the 1963 formation of the Bundesliga, Germany's new professional league. Wacker went on to play second-tier football in the Regionalliga Berlin and the 2. Bundesliga Nord where they did quite well on the field despite limited resources. Through the early 1970s the club earned three second and one first place Regionalliga finishes. The club's experience in the 2. Bundesliga in the middle of the decade was more difficult, finally leading to their relegation to the Amateurliga Berlin (III) in 1977. After one more season in the 2. Bundesliga Nord, Wacker slipped to third and fourth division play where they toiled for a decade and a half before finally going bankrupt in 1994, playing in the tier four Verbandsliga Berlin at the time.

Some of its members went on to join BFC Alemannia 90, resulting in the club playing as BFC Alemannia 90 Wacker, a name that was never official and was reverted by the club in 2013.

== Honours ==
The club's honours:

- Regionalliga Berlin (II)
  - Champions: 1972
  - Runners-up: 1971, 1972, 1972
- Amateur-Oberliga Berlin (III)
  - Champions: 1978
- Berliner Landespokal
  - Winners: 1950, 1968, 1972
  - Runners-up: 1931, 1952, 1959, 1963, 1965, 1971, 1980

== See also ==
- Berlin derby
