= Füchse Berlin Reinickendorf =

German sports club

- Full name: Füchse Berlin Reinickendorf e.V. BTSV von 1891
- Nickname: Die Füchse (The Foxes)
- Founded: 28 January 1891
- Stadium: Sportplatz Kienhorststraße
- Chairman: Frank Steffel
- Manager: Guido Perschk
- League: NOFV-Oberliga Nord (V)
- 2025–26: Berlin-Liga, 1st of 18 (promoted)
- Website: https://www.fuechse-berlin-reinickendorf.de/
Home colours	Away colours

Füchse Berlin Reinickendorf are a German sports club based in Reinickendorf, a western district of Berlin. The football side is part of a larger sports association that has departments for basketball, bowling, boxing, gymnastics, team handball, ice hockey, swimming, tennis, table tennis, and volleyball. In January 2007, the Metropol Cricket Team Berlin joined the club as its cricket department.

== History ==
The club was established 28 January 1891 as the gymnastics club Turn Verein Reinickendorf. To honour the memory of Adolf Dorner, who played a leading role in promoting gymnastics within German schools, the club was renamed Turnverein Dorner in September 1893. As the association grew to include departments for other sports it became Turn- und Sportverein Dorner.

In November 1937 TSV Dorner joined Reinickendorfer Fußball Club Halley-Concordia and the Reinickendorfer Hockeyclub to create Turn- und Rasensportverein Reinickendorf. RFC Halley-Concordia was the product of the 1925 union between Reinickendorfer FC Halley 1910 and Concordia 95. This club made a brief two season appearance in top-flight Berlin football competition, from 1929 until 1931.

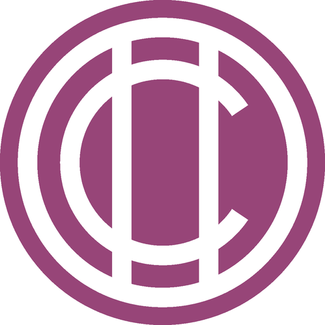
Crest of Reinickendorfer FC Halley Concordia, c. 1931.

In the aftermath of World War II most associations in the country, including sports and football clubs, were dissolved by occupying Allied authorities. Most of the former membership of Tura was re-organized as SG Reinickendorf Ost in late 1945, while the footballers formed SG Felsenbeck. In April 1947 SG Reinickendorf Ost gave rise to today's club, Berliner Turn- und Sportverein von 1891 Reinickendorfer Füchse. Felsenbeck became RFC Halley – Borussia in July 1948 and on 1 December the same year, joined BSTV.

== Football ==
The club rose up out of lower-level local competition to third-division play in the Amateurliga Berlin (III) in 1958. After the formation in 1963 of the Bundesliga, Germany's first professional football league, Reinickendorf joined the new second-division Regionalliga Berlin on the strength of a third-place finish. A lower-table side there, the team was relegated after a 16th-place finish in 1969. They continued to play as a third-tier side for nearly three decades, finally slipping out of what had become the Regionalliga Nordost (III) to the Oberliga Nordost-Nord (IV) in 1998. During that time Die Füchse captured two Amateur Oberliga Berlin (III) titles, in 1989 and 1990, but performed poorly in the subsequent promotion rounds for the 2. Bundesliga.

In seven seasons in the Oberliga Nordost-Nord, Reinickendorf generally earned ordinary results until finally being sent down to the Verbandsliga Berlin (V) in 2005, where they played until 2008, earning promotion back to the NOFV-Oberliga Nord.

Throughout the 1990s and into the new millennium, the team has enjoyed some success in cup competition, winning Berlin's Paul Rusch Cup in 1997 and 2003 in addition to making two other losing cup final appearances.

The club announced on 26 April 2012 that all sports departments of the club would form under the new name Füchse Berlin Reinickendorf.

The football team was relegated from the Berlin-Liga to the Landesliga Berlin after finishing sixteenth in 2013–14, but bounced back to the higher league after finishing second in 2014–15.

== Football honours ==
The club's honours:

- Amateur-Oberliga Berlin (III)
  - Champions: 1989, 1990
- Berlin-Liga
  - Champions: 2008
- Berliner Landespokal
  - Winner: 1997, 2003
  - Finalist: 1979, 1981, 1992, 2002

== See also ==
- Füchse Berlin (handball)
