= Spandauer SV =

German football club

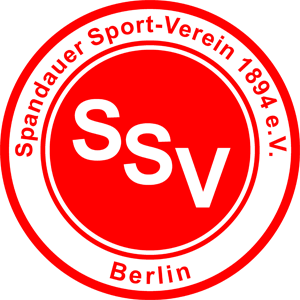
- Full name: Spandauer Sportverein 1894 e.V.
- Founded: 1894
- Dissolved: 2014
- Ground: Stadion an der Neuendorfer Straße
- Capacity: 3,000
Home colours	Away colours

Spandauer SV was a German football club from Berlin.

== History ==
=== Early years ===
The capital city was one of the earliest centres of German football and was home to 1. Spandauer Fußballklub Triton, formed on 24 May 1894, and Sportclub Germania Spandau, formed on 15 October 1895. These two sides merged late in 1920 to form Spandauer Sport-Vereinigung 94/95 e.V., the predecessor of today's club.

The team was promoted to the Verbandsliga Berlin-Brandenburg in 1921 where they earned a string of third- and fourth-place finishes. Their best result was a distant second place behind Hertha BSC in 1928.

German football was re-organized under the Third Reich in 1933 into sixteen top flight Gauligen. SSV joined the Gauliga Berlin-Brandenburg and played there until relegated in 1936. They returned briefly in 1939 only to be immediately relegated again. In 1944, towards the end of World War II, Spandau and SC Minerva 93 Berlin were melded into the wartime side KSG Minerva/SSG Berlin to play a final war-shortened season.

=== Postwar play ===
After the conflict the club was dissolved, like most other organizations in Germany, including sports and football associations. It was re-constituted in 1945 as SG Spandau-Altstadt and played in the city's first postwar league. The first division Oberliga Berlin was formed a year later and the club played there as SG Spandau-Altstadt beginning in 1947.

By the end of 1949 the team took on its current name Spandauer Sport-Verein 1894 e.V. They were relegated for a season, but managed a return to the top flight the next year. Spandau consistently finished in the upper half of the league table, but were unable to do better than second-place finishes in 1953 and 1959. SSV captured three consecutive Berlin Cups in 1954–1956 and advanced as far as the quarter-final round of the 1957 German Cup where they were put out 1–4 by Bayern Munich.

=== Spandau refuses the Bundesliga ===
Berlin's representative in Germany's new profession football league, the Bundesliga, formed in 1963, was city Oberliga champion Hertha BSC. Spandau continued play in what was now the second tier Regionalliga Berlin (or Stadtliga Berlin).

The club had a minor role in the debacle of SC Tasmania 1900 Berlin's promotion to the top-flight Bundesliga after Hertha was demoted for breaking the league's player salary rules. The politics of the Cold War era led to a space being held open for a Berlin side in the top league to replace Hertha in a show of solidarity with the former capital city. Spandau – coming off a second-place finish – refused an offer to advance, leaving the way open to Tasmania, which went on to the worst season in Bundesliga history.

=== A dramatic decline, then the end ===
Spandau continued to play as a tier II side in the Regionalliga Berlin until slipping to the Amateurliga Berlin for the 1974–75 season. When they returned to second level play the following year they found themselves in the newly established 2. Bundesliga Nord. Instead of playing against other city teams in the weak Regionalliga Berlin they were pitted against stronger competition from across the north of the country and they went on to suffer through a season as disastrous as Tasmania's turn in the Bundesliga.

Spandau finished last, never once rising from the bottom position, with a record of 2 wins, 4 draws, and 32 losses. They did not earn their first point until a 15th round 1–1 draw with SG Wattenscheid 09. Their first victory did not come until their 23rd round match against Bayer 04 Leverkusen. By season's end they had been outscored 33–115.

The club returned to tier III football in the amateur city league where they would play for the next 23 seasons. Financial problems in 1999 led to the club's license being revoked and relegation to the Verbandsliga Berlin (V), from where the club was promoted back to the Oberliga in 2007. It dropped as far as the Bezirksliga again but won promotion back to the Landesliga in 2012.

The club began the 2012–13 Landesliga season with an impressive 11–0 win over BSV Hürriyet-Burgund in which striker Mehmet Aydin, top scorer of the Bezirksliga in the previous season with 30 goals, scored nine goals. At the end of that season they finished at 5th place, and the 2013–14 season at 13th. However, in April 2014 the club filed for bankruptcy. SSV started the 2014–15 season losing all 13 games. As a result, the club withdrew its men's senior sides with immediate effect from all playing activities. Had the club come out of bankruptcy proceedings and resumed its playing activity, they might have restarted from Kreisliga C in time for the 2015–16 season. But the club failed to come out of insolvency, so on 8 December 2014 it was wound up in a Charlottenburg district court, ending its 120-year existence and striking them off the German football clubs' (and the German FA's) register.

== Honours ==
The club's honours:

- Amateurliga Berlin (III)
  - Champions: 1975
- Berlin-Liga (V)
  - Champions: 2007
- Berliner Landespokal (Tiers III-VII)
  - Winners: 1954, 1955, 1956, 1974, 1978

== See also ==
- Berlin derby
