= SC Tasmania 1900 Berlin =

German football club

- Full name: Sport-Club Tasmania von 1900 Berlin e.V.
- Founded: 2 June 1900
- Dissolved: 1973
Home colours	Away colours

SC Tasmania 1900 Berlin was a German football club based in the Berlin district of Neukölln.

== History ==
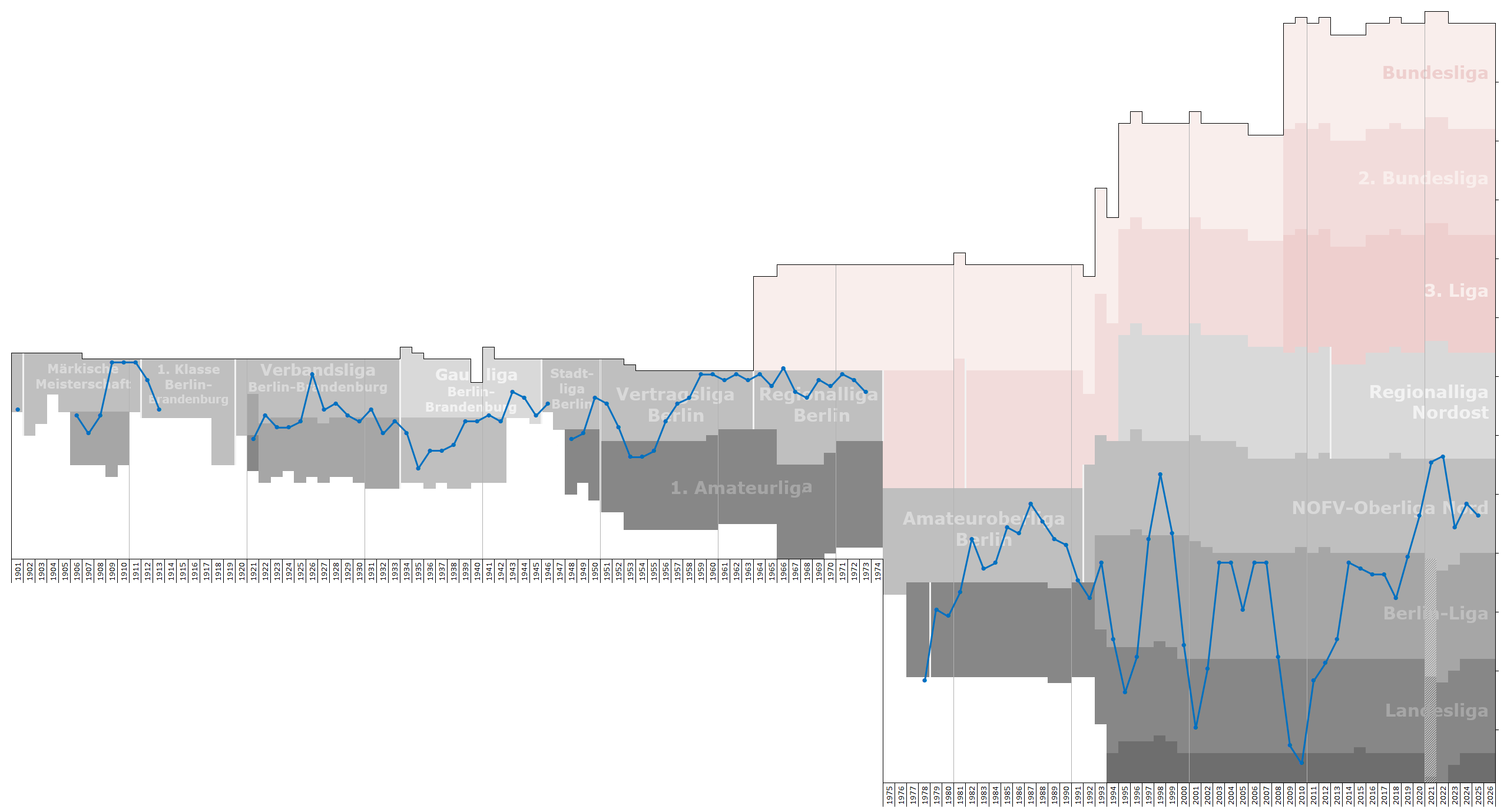
Historical chart of the club's league performance

The club was founded as Rixdorfer TuFC Tasmania 1900 on 2 June 1900. It is believed the founders of the club were about to migrate to Australia at the end of the 19th century, so they named their club after their shared desired destination Tasmania.

In 1965, Berlin's only Bundesliga side, Hertha BSC, had its license revoked and was relegated for breaking the league's player salary rules. The German Football Association wanted to keep a club in the city of Berlin for political reasons and this led to one of the strangest episodes in the Bundesliga's history.

Both Karlsruher SC and FC Schalke 04 tried to avoid being demoted by laying claim to Hertha's place. It was decided to suspend relegation for one season and increase the number of teams in the league from 16 to 18 to accommodate the two teams which would normally be promoted from the Regionalligen, the Regional Leagues being the leagues below the Bundesliga at the time. Cold War politics led to a space being held for a team from the former capital city to replace Hertha.

The winner of Regionalliga Berlin, Tennis Borussia Berlin, had failed to advance to the Bundesliga through the regular promotion round that saw Bayern Munich and Borussia Mönchengladbach move up. After the Regionalliga second-place finisher, Spandauer SV, refused an offer of promotion, the way was clear for third-place club Tasmania 1900 to take up the opportunity to represent Berlin in the Bundesliga — just two weeks before the start of the 1965–66 season.

A top performer in the relatively weak Regionalliga Berlin, Tasmania would find themselves seriously overmatched in the Bundesliga. Despite a season-opening 2–0 win over Karlsruher SC at the Olympiastadion, they would go on to become the worst team in league history — in a 34-game season they won only one other time, a 2–1 at home over Borussia Neunkirchen. They scored only 15 goals while conceding 108 and finished the season in last place earning just 8 of a possible 68 points. The only team not to beat Tasmania was 1. FC Kaiserslautern which managed only two draws (0–0 and 1–1) against them. The 0–0 result at Betzenberg was the only point earned by Tasmania away from their home stadium.

Tasmania were relegated at the end of the season and returned to the Regionalliga Berlin. Although the team made it to the promotion round twice between 1966 and 1973, they never managed a return to the Bundesliga. In 1973, the Neukölln sports association declared bankruptcy.

=== SV Tasmania Berlin ===
A successor team, SC Tasmania 73 Neukölln was created, becoming SV Tasmania-Gropiusstadt 1973 in 2000. While the new club's first team had to restart in the lowest division in 1973 and quickly rose through the ranks again, their youth teams were permitted to remain in the leagues they played in under the old name. Since 2011, the club has been known as SV Tasmania Berlin.

== Dubious distinctions ==
- 56th out of 56 in all-time Bundesliga standings
- fewest points collected in a season: 8 points under the old scoring method of two points for a win, 10 points under today's system that allows three points for a win
- fewest wins in a season: 2 (tied by Wuppertaler SV in 1974–1975)
- most defeats in a season: 28
- only Bundesliga team without an away win
- longest winless streak: 31 games (14 August 1965 – 21 May 1966); this record was almost tied when FC Schalke 04 failed to win for thirty consecutive games between January 2020 and January 2021
- most home defeats in a season: 12
- most consecutive home losses: 8 games (28 August 1965 – 8 December 1965), tied by Hansa Rostock in 2004–05
- most consecutive losses: 10 matches, tied by Arminia Bielefeld in 1999–2000, whose fans began to derisively chant "Tasmania Bielefeld!" during the record tying match
- worst ever goals for-and-against: 15–108 (goal difference of -93)
- fewest ever goals for a team's leading scorer: 4 by Wulf-Ingo Usbeck
- biggest losing margin at home: 0–9 to Meidericher SV (26 March 1966); this record was almost tied when Bayer Leverkusen won at SSV Ulm 1846 9–1 in 2000, Leandro Fonseca scored for Ulm in injury time
- until 1993, most minutes played without scoring a goal: 831 minutes (2 October 1965 – 11 December 1965), since surpassed by 1. FC Saarbrücken and 1. FC Köln
- smallest ever crowd at a Bundesliga game: 827 (15 January 1966 against Borussia Mönchengladbach) after crowds of 81,500 at their first home game and 70,000 at their second

== Former managers ==
- (West Germany) Gunther Baumann 1963–64
- (West Germany) Franz Linken 1964–65
- (West Germany) Heinz-Ludwig Schmidt 1965–68
- (Hungary) Gyula Lóránt 1968–69
- (Socialist Federal Republic of Yugoslavia) Milan Antolković 1969–70
- (West Germany) Hans Hipp 1970–72
- (West Germany) Peter Velhorn 1972–73
