= SC Gatow =

German football club

- Full name: Sportclub Gatow Berlin
- Founded: 1931; 95 years ago
- Ground: Sportplatz Gatow; Gatow, Berlin, Germany
- Capacity: 1,000
- Manager: (Germany) Axel Vogel
- League: Landesliga Berlin Staffel 1
- Website: http://www.sc-gatow.de/
Home colours	Away colours

Sportclub Gatow Berlin is a German football club from the district of Gatow, Berlin. It was founded in 1931 as Gatower Sportverein. The club was lost in 1945 in the aftermath of World War II, but reemerged as Sportgruppe Gatow. It readopted its historical identity on 1 April 1949.

The team's best results were a pair of second-place finishes in the Amateurliga Berlin (III) in 1964 and 1965, leading to a single season in the second tier Regionalliga Berlin in 1965–66. They spent the balance of the 1960s in the Amateurliga before falling to lower level play. Gatow returned to what had become the Amateur Oberliga Berlin (III) in 1980 where they played for much of the decade and on into the early 1990s. They currently are part of the Landesliga Berlin, Staffel 1 (VII).

== Current squad ==
Note: Flags indicate national team as defined under FIFA eligibility rules; some limited exceptions apply. Players may hold more than one non-FIFA nationality.

No.	Pos.	Nation	Player
—	GK	BEL	Patrick Boel
—	GK	GER	Enes Isik
—	GK	GER	Jens-Uwe Schulze
—	GK	GER	Kilian Koal
—	DF	TUR	Fethi Yüksel
—	DF	TUR	Fatih Güllü
—	DF	GER	Michael Karakaya
—	DF	GER	Karim Zagmouz
—	DF	GER	Noah Strassmann
—	DF	GER	Eric Reitmann
—	DF	TUR	Önder Kalkan
—	DF	FRA	Moussa Seck
—	DF	GER	Amir Awag
—	DF	GER	Colin Greiser
—	DF	GER	Dustin Abdel-Meguid
—	DF	GER	Luthando Saul
—	MF	GER	David De Camp
—	MF	GER	Benedict Richter
—	MF	GER	Djamel Berrahma

No.	Pos.	Nation	Player
—	MF	GER	Nico Barlot
—	MF	GER	Till Jacobs
—	MF	GER	Tobias Benkendorf
—	MF	GER	Felix Kügler
—	MF	FRA	Noah Fabourg
—	MF	TUR	Kubilay Sengün
—	MF	GER	Avni Kablan
—	MF	GER	Ilhan Sariboga
—	MF	GER	Dennis Rehausen
—	MF	GER	Arda Dülek
—	MF	TUR	Onur Uslucan
—	MF	GER	Fatih Aydogdu
—	FW	GER	Thorbjörn Teschendorf
—	FW	GER	Alessandro Lenk
—	FW	GER	Lars Kobus
—	FW	LBN	Ramy Raychouni
—	FW	GER	Soheil Gouhari
—	FW	GER	Philipp Schulz
