= 1963 German football championship =

1963 German championship
Deutsche Fußballmeisterschaft

Tournament details
- Country: West Germany
- Dates: 18 May – 29 June
- Teams: 9

Final positions
- Champions: Borussia Dortmund; 3rd German title
- Runners-up: 1. FC Köln
- European Cup: Borussia Dortmund

Tournament statistics
- Matches played: 26
- Goals scored: 110 (4.23 per match)
- Top goal scorer: Christian Müller (9 goals)

The 1963 German football championship was the culmination of the football season in the Federal Republic of Germany in 1962–63. Borussia Dortmund were crowned champions for the third time after a group stage and a final, having previously won the championship in 1956 and 1957.

Defending champions 1. FC Köln made its third appearance in the final, having won the previous year's championship and lost in 1960, but lost 3-1 to Borussia Dortmund.

On the strength of this title, Borussia Dortmund participated in the 1963–64 European Cup, where the team lost to Inter Milan in the semi-finals.

The format used to determine the German champion was similar to the one used in the 1962 season. Nine clubs qualified for the tournament, with the runners-up of the South and the North having to play a qualifying match. The remaining eight clubs then played a home-and-away round in two groups of four, with the two group winners entering the final. In the previous year, a single round had been played in the group stages because of the 1962 FIFA World Cup, in order to reduce the schedule and not hinder West Germany at the tournament in Chile, where West Germany was knocked out by Yugoslavia in the quarterfinals.

The 1963 edition was the last edition before the introduction of the Bundesliga, and the last one to have a championship final match. From 1963-64 onwards, the German championship would have a consistent format with 18 teams and 34 matches, in a double round-robin tournament (except in 1991-92, when due to German reunification the league had 20 teams and 38 matches).

== Qualified teams ==
The following teams qualified through the 1962–63 Oberliga season:

Club	Qualified from
Hamburger SV	Oberliga Nord champions
SV Werder Bremen	Oberliga Nord runners-up
1. FC Köln	Oberliga West champions
Borussia Dortmund	Oberliga West runners-up
Hertha BSC Berlin	Oberliga Berlin champions
1. FC Kaiserslautern	Oberliga Südwest champions
Borussia Neunkirchen	Oberliga Südwest runners-up
TSV 1860 Munich	Oberliga Süd champions
1. FC Nürnberg	Oberliga Süd runners-up

== Competition ==
=== Qualifying round ===
18 May 1963	1. FC Nürnberg	2–1	Werder Bremen	Ludwigshafen
	Reisch 17', 51' (pen.)		Schütz 37' (pen.)	Stadium: Südweststadion; Attendance: 58,000; Referee: Hensel (Oberhausen)

=== Group 1 ===
Pos	Team	Pld	W	D	L	GF	GA	GR	Pts	Qualification	KOE	FCN	BSC	FCK
1	1. FC Köln	6	4	2	0	29	12	2.417	10	Advance to final	—	6–2	5–1	8–2
2	1. FC Nürnberg	6	3	2	1	19	12	1.583	8		3–3	—	5–0	5–1
3	Hertha BSC	6	1	1	4	8	19	0.421	3		3–6	0–2	—	3–0
4	1. FC Kaiserslautern	6	0	3	3	7	20	0.350	3		1–1	2–2	1–1	—

Source: RSSSF
Rules for classification: 1) Points; 2) Goal ratio.

25 May 1963	1. FC Nürnberg	3–3	1. FC Köln	Nürnberg
	Reisch 9'; Strehl 36', 45'		Sturm 4'; Hemmersbach 14'; Hornig 14'	Stadium: Club-Stadion im Zabo; Attendance: 41,000; Referee: Ott (Rheinbrohl)

25 May 1963	1. FC Kaiserslautern	1–1	Hertha BSC	Ludwigshafen
	Meier 59'		Lange 57'	Stadium: Südweststadion; Attendance: 40,000; Referee: Schörnig (Düsseldorf)

29 May 1963	1. FC Köln	8–2	1. FC Kaiserslautern	Cologne
	Sturm 16'; Schäfer 37'; Müller 51', 73'; Benthaus 68'; Hornig 70'; Regh 75'; Thielen 83'		Reitgaßl 2'; Neumann 6'	Stadium: Müngersdorfer Stadion; Attendance: 50,000; Referee: Kreitlein (Stuttgart)

29 May 1963	Hertha BSC	0–2	1. FC Nürnberg	Berlin
			Dachlauer 32'; Strehl 79'	Stadium: Olympiastadion; Attendance: 50,000; Referee: Fritz (Ludwigshafen)

1 June 1963	1. FC Kaiserslautern	2–2	1. FC Nürnberg	Ludwigshafen
	Reitgaßl 47'; Settelmeyer 49'		Flachenecker 66', 77'	Stadium: Südweststadion; Attendance: 32,000; Referee: Schulenburg (Hamburg)

1 June 1963	Hertha BSC	3–6	1. FC Köln	Berlin
	Waclawiak 13'; Altendorff 58' (pen.), 65'		Regh 1'; Schäfer 19'; Müller 39', 77'; Thielen 47', 75'	Stadium: Olympiastadion; Attendance: 37,000; Referee: Handwerker (Ketsch)

8 June 1963	1. FC Nürnberg	5–1	1. FC Kaiserslautern	Nuremberg
	Wild 59', 65'; Morlock 67'; Dachlauer 83'; Reisch 90'		Pulter 17'	Stadium: Club-Stadion im Zabo; Attendance: 30,000; Referee: Thier (Gelsenkirchen)

8 June 1963	1. FC Köln	5–1	Hertha BSC	Cologne
	Müller 23', 50', 73', 90'; Sturm 88'		Lange 60'	Stadium: Müngersdorfer Stadion; Attendance: 35,000; Referee: Sparing (Kassel)

15 June 1963	1. FC Nürnberg	5–0	Hertha BSC	Nuremberg
	Morlock 20', 57'; Wild 45'; Haseneder 55', 65'			Stadium: Club-Stadion im Zabo; Attendance: 16,000; Referee: Deuschel (Ludwigshafen)

15 June 1963	1. FC Kaiserslautern	1–1	1. FC Köln	Ludwigshafen
	Neumann 78'		Regh 30'	Stadium: Südweststadion; Attendance: 22,000; Referee: Kandlbinder (Regensburg)

22 June 1963	1. FC Köln	6–2	1. FC Nürnberg	Cologne
	Müller 5'; Schäfer 8'; Thielen 14', 43', 77'; Sturm 40' (pen.)		Wild 63', 86'	Stadium: Müngersdorfer Stadion; Attendance: 58,000; Referee: Schulenburg (Hamburg)

22 June 1963	Hertha BSC	3–0	1. FC Kaiserslautern	Berlin
	Faeder 35', 75'; Altendorff 55'			Stadium: Olympiastadion; Attendance: 10,000; Referee: Schmidt (Waldbröl)

=== Group 2 ===
Pos	Team	Pld	W	D	L	GF	GA	GR	Pts	Qualification	BVB	M60	BNE	HSV
1	Borussia Dortmund	6	4	1	1	15	7	2.143	9	Advance to final	—	4–0	0–0	3–2
2	1860 Munich	6	3	0	3	10	12	0.833	6		3–2	—	4–0	2–1
3	Borussia Neunkirchen	6	2	2	2	8	11	0.727	6		2–5	2–1	—	3–0
4	Hamburger SV	6	1	1	4	7	10	0.700	3		0–1	3–0	1–1	—

Source: RSSSF
Rules for classification: 1) Points; 2) Goal ratio.

25 May 1963	TSV 1860 Munich	3–2	Borussia Dortmund	Munich
	Brunnenmeier 7', 86'; Küppers 82'		Wosab 23'; Konietzka 50'	Stadium: Stadion an der Grünwalder Straße; Attendance: 45,000; Referee: Zimmermann (Wolfsburg)

25 May 1963	Borussia Neunkirchen	3–0	Hamburger SV	Saarbrücken
	Pidancet 17'; May 78'; Melcher 90'			Stadium: Ludwigspark; Attendance: 40,000; Referee: Fischer (Augsburg)

29 May 1963	Hamburger SV	3–0	TSV 1860 Munich	Hamburg
	Wulf 4'; Dörfel 48'; Seeler 84'			Stadium: Volksparkstadion; Attendance: 58,000; Referee: Malka (Herten)

29 May 1963	Borussia Dortmund	0–0	Borussia Neunkirchen	Dortmund
				Stadium: Rote Erde; Attendance: 27,000; Referee: Lutz (Bremen)

1 June 1963	TSV 1860 Munich	4–0	Borussia Neunkirchen	Munich
				Stadium: Stadion an der Grünwalder Straße

1 June 1963	Borussia Dortmund	3–2	Hamburger SV	Dortmund
				Stadium: Rote Erde

8 June 1963	Borussia Neunkirchen	2–1	TSV 1860 Munich	Saarbrücken
				Stadium: Ludwigspark

8 June 1963	Hamburger SV	0–1	Borussia Dortmund	Hamburg
				Stadium: Volksparkstadion

15 June 1963	TSV 1860 Munich	2–1	Hamburger SV	Munich
				Stadium: Stadion an der Grünwalder Straße

15 June 1963	Borussia Neunkirchen	2–5	Borussia Dortmund	Saarbrücken
				Stadium: Ludwigspark

22 June 1963	Borussia Dortmund	4–0	TSV 1860 Munich	Dortmund
				Stadium: Rote Erde

22 June 1963	Hamburger SV	1–1	Borussia Neunkirchen	Hamburg
				Stadium: Volksparkstadion

=== Final ===
29 June 1963

Borussia Dortmund	3–1	1. FC Köln
Kurrat 9'; Wosab 57'; Schmidt 65'		Schnellinger 73'

Neckarstadion, Stuttgart
Attendance: 75,000
Referee: Kurt Tschenscher (Mannheim)

BORUSSIA DORTMUND:
GK	1	(West Germany) Bernhard Wessel
RB	2	(West Germany) Wilhelm Burgsmüller (c)
CB	5	(West Germany) Wolfgang Paul
LB	3	(West Germany) Lothar Geisler
RH	4	(West Germany) Helmut Bracht
LH	6	(West Germany) Dieter Kurrat
OR	7	(West Germany) Reinhold Wosab
IR	8	(West Germany) Alfred Schmidt
CF	9	(West Germany) Jürgen Schütz
IL	10	(West Germany) Friedhelm Konietzka
OL	11	(West Germany) Gerd Cyliax
Manager:
(West Germany) Hermann Eppenhoff

1. FC KÖLN:
GK	1	(West Germany) Fritz Ewert
RB	2	(West Germany) Fritz Pott
CB	5	(West Germany) Leo Wilden
LB	3	(West Germany) Karl-Heinz Schnellinger
RH	4	(West Germany) Helmut Benthaus
LH	6	(West Germany) Hans Sturm
OR	7	(West Germany) Karl-Heinz Thielen
IR	8	(West Germany) Hans Schäfer (c)
CF	9	(West Germany) Anton Regh
IL	10	(West Germany) Karl-Heinz Ripkens
OL	11	(West Germany) Heinz Hornig
Manager:
(Socialist Federal Republic of Yugoslavia) Zlatko Čajkovski
