= Christian Breuer (footballer) =

German footballer (1939–2017)

- Breuer in the 1967–68 season

Personal information
- Full name: Christian Breuer
- Date of birth: 24 April 1939
- Place of birth: Hüchelhoven-Fliesteden, Cologne-Aachen, Germany
- Date of death: 7 September 2017 (aged 78)
- Place of death: Aachen, North Rhine-Westphalia, Germany
- Position: Midfielder

Youth career
- ???–1958: SC Fliesteden

Senior career*
Years	Team	Apps	(Gls)
1958–1962	1. FC Köln	100	(13)
1962–1966	Alemannia Aachen	103	(31)
1966–1970	Hannover 96	122	(11)
1970–1975	Alemannia Aachen		
1975–1978	Rhenania Würselen		
1978–1980	Rhenania Richterich		
- * Club domestic league appearances and goals

Christian Breuer (24 April 1939 – 7 September 2017) was a German footballer. He played as a midfielder for various clubs in the Bundesliga including 1. FC Köln, Alemannia Aachen and Hannover 96 throughout the 1960s and the 1970s.

== Career ==
=== 1. FC Köln (1958–62) ===
Together with his cousin Christian Müller, Breuer moved in the summer of 1958 from SC Fliesteden to 1. FC Köln in the Oberliga West, where Fritz Breuer (no relation) had been playing since the early 1950s. He was a versatile player as he played as both a forward as well as a midfielder. However, due to the sharp transition from amateur football to the level of the Oberliga as well as the performance of the Köln team squad meant that he did not play in the Oberliga association round in the first season of the 1958–59 Oberliga. In the final round of the German championship, however, he made his official debut by coach Péter Szabó on 20 June 1959 in Köln in a match against FK Pirmasens alongside teammates Fritz Breuer, Fritz Ewert, Josef Röhrig, Hans Schäfer and Karl-Heinz Schnellinger. From the 1959–60 season to the 1961–62 season he belonged to the respective Köln championship teams in the Oberliga West and represented the "Geißbockelf" in 17 games in the final round of the German championship and scored one goal. In the 1959–60 finals, he reached the final of the Oberliga for the first time with Köln but lost the final with his teammates on 25 June in Frankfurt with 2–3 goals against Hamburger SV. The highlight of his playing career was the title win in the championship finals in 1962, when the team of President Franz Kremer replaced the defending champions 1. FC Nürnberg. Despite this success, Breuer joined Oberliga rivals Alemannia Aachen for the 1962–63 season. From 1959 to 1962, he played 63 games for Köln in the Oberliga West, scoring eleven goals. In Europe, he had represented the colors of Köln in the Messecup against AS Roma and 1. In total, Breuer played one hundred competitive games for 1. FC Köln and scored thirteen goals.

=== Alemannia Aachen (1962–66) ===
With the 1962–63 Oberliga being the last edition of the old German top-flight, Christian Breuer played all 30 round-robin games for the Tivoli team under coach Oswald Pfau and finished fifth with Alemannia. Against his former team and renewed title holder in the West, 1. FC Köln, he scored 3–1 points with his teammates Alfred Glenski, Josef Martinelli and Branko Zebec. With the offensively strong "Jupp" Martinelli and the Yugoslavian ex-national player Zebec as defensive chief, he formed a line of runners in a class of its own. Surprisingly, Aachen, a continuous member of the Oberliga West from 1947 to 1963, was not nominated for the new Bundesliga for the inaugural 1963–64 season, Breuer and his colleagues played in the second division of the Regionalliga West from the start of the Bundesliga, competing with Eintracht Duisburg 1848 and Preußen Münster for promotion. As hoped, Alemannia won the championship in 1964 and moved into the promotion playoffs. There, however, the West champions finished third behind Hannover 96 and KSV Hessen Kassel and thus remained in the Regionalliga. In the second Bundesliga attempt in 1965, Breuer and colleagues were runners-up behind Borussia Mönchengladbach and failed in the promotion round against Bayern Munich. During the 1964–65 DFB-Pokal, Alemannia had previously fought their way into the cup final with a 4-3 semi-final victory against FC Schalke 04 after extra time with the powerful Christian Breuer scoring the winning goal in the 100th minute of the game. They later lost 2–0 to old Oberliga West rivals Borussia Dortmund in Hanover on 22 May. In the 1965–66, Aachen would remain in third place behind Fortuna Düsseldorf and Rot-Weiss Essen and did not reach the promotion playoffs. Even a change of coach in October 1965 from Pfau to Williberth Werth did not bring any success. At the age of 27, Breuer accepted the offer of the Bundesliga club Hannover 96 in the summer of 1966 after 103 regional league appearances with 31 goals for Aachen and was thus in the squad of the "Reds" in Hanover for the 1966–67 season.

=== Hannover 96 (1966–70) ===
In four seasons of Bundesliga football from 1966 to 1970, the new signing from Aachen experienced turbulence in the coaching area in Hannover alongside the signings of Horst Buhtz, Zlatko Čajkovski, Jupp Heynckes and Josip Skoblar but the club still no saw advance to the top of the table. Breuer was always part of the starting XI for the four years with consistent unsatisfactory placements even with managerial changes. In the Bundesliga, the 96ers fell from ninth in the 1966–67 season to 13th place by the 1969–70 season and in the Messecup against SSC Napoli, B 1909 Odense, AIK Stockholm, Leeds United, Ajax, they wouldn't any further success. On 3 May 1970, Breuer played his last game for Hannover 96 in the 4–2 home win against 1. FC Kaiserslautern. After 122 Bundesliga games with 11 goals for the Lower Saxon team, Breuer returned to Alemannia Aachen in the Regionalliga West for the 1970–71 season.

=== Alemannia Aachen (1970–75) ===
In his first season following his return from Hanover, he finished sixth in the 1970–71 Regionalliga with his teammates Herbert Gronen, Erwin Hermandung, Werner Scholz and Horst Schauß under the management of Hermann Lindemann but was replaced by Volker Kottmann from the second half of the season. With VfL Bochum, Fortuna Düsseldorf and Wuppertaler SV at the top of the table, the immediate return to the Bundesliga wasn't a feasible goal for Aachen. Until the final season of the old Regionalliga during the 1973–74 season, Breuer was named captain of the team as he played with his teammates Georg Marwig, Karl Del'Haye, Hans-Jürgen Ferdinand, Willi Haag, Joaquín Montañés, Christoph Walter and coach Michael Pfeiffer but would ultimately fail to qualify for promotion due to competition from other clubs such as Wattenscheid 09, Rot-Weiß Oberhausen and Bayer 05 Uerdingen and finished seventh in 1974. In his two tenures for the club, Breuer played 238 games for Aachen in the Regionalliga West, scoring 52 goals.

At the age of 35, the senior also tackled the inaugural season of the 1974–75 2. Bundesliga. Coach Pfeiffer was replaced by Horst Witzler in September 1974 and Rolf Kucharski scored 20 goals for Alemannia. In the final season with Aachen, the captain experienced the fight against relegation in the new league. With 30–46 points, the Black and Yellows finished in 15th place, nearly facing relegation. On 15 June 1975, in the 2–0 away defeat against Arminia Bielefeld, Breuer played his last game in the 2. Bundesliga with fellow defenders Gerhard Prokop, Josef Bläser, Peter Stollwerk and Franz Pavlak, ending his career as a professional footballer. He had played another 31 round-robin games with one goal.

== Later life ==
The trained locksmith ran a stationery shop in the Aachen district of Richterich and had also made himself at home there. He took over for the 1975–76 season as a player-coach for the amateur club Rhenania Würselen and from 1977 to 1979, for Rhenania Richterich, where he held on to the coaching office until 1982.

His appearances in the 1976–77 and 1977–78 seasons, which are still attributed to Christian Breuer, were played by Franz-Josef Breuer, who came from SC Jülich 1910.
