= 1962 German football championship =

1962 German championship
Deutsche Fußballmeisterschaft

Tournament details
- Country: West Germany
- Dates: 14 April – 12 May
- Teams: 9

Final positions
- Champions: 1. FC Köln; 1st German title
- Runners-up: 1. FC Nürnberg
- European Cup: 1. FC Köln

Tournament statistics
- Matches played: 14
- Goals scored: 65 (4.64 per match)
- Top goal scorer(s): Erwin Stein; Karl-Heinz Thielen (6 goals each)

The 1962 German football championship was the culmination of the football season in the Federal Republic of Germany in 1961–62. 1. FC Köln were crowned champions for the first time after a group stage and a final, having previously reached the final in 1960, where they lost to Hamburger SV.

On the strength of this title, the club participated in the 1962–63 European Cup, where Köln lost to Dundee F.C. in the preliminary round.

Runners-up 1. FC Nürnberg made its twelfth and last appearance in the national title game, having won the previous year's championship.

The format used to determine the German champion was similar to the one used in the 1961 season. Nine clubs qualified for the tournament, with the runners-up of West and North having to play a qualifying match. The remaining eight clubs then played a single round in two groups of four, with the two group winners entering the final. In previous years, a home-and-away round had been played in the group stages but because of the 1962 FIFA World Cup, where Germany participated in, the schedule was reduced, as had been the case in previous world cup years.

== Qualified teams ==
The teams qualified through the 1961–62 Oberliga season:

Club	Qualified from
Hamburger SV	Oberliga Nord champions
SV Werder Bremen	Oberliga Nord runners-up
1. FC Köln	Oberliga West champions
Schalke 04	Oberliga West runners-up
Tasmania 1900 Berlin	Oberliga Berlin champions
Borussia Neunkirchen	Oberliga Südwest champions
FK Pirmasens	Oberliga Südwest runners-up
1. FC Nürnberg	Oberliga Süd champions
Eintracht Frankfurt	Oberliga Süd runners-up

== Competition ==
=== Qualifying round ===
14 April 1962	Schalke 04	4–1 (a.e.t.)	Werder Bremen	Hannover
	Ipta 53'; Koslowski 93'; Assmy 98'; Klodt 104' (pen.)		Schütz 90'	Stadium: Niedersachsenstadion; Attendance: 60,000; Referee: Dusch (Kaiserslautern)

=== Group 1 ===
Pos	Team	Pld	W	D	L	GF	GA	GR	Pts	Qualification	FCN	SCT	S04	BNE
1	1. FC Nürnberg	3	3	0	0	8	4	2.000	6	Advance to final	—	—	3–1	3–2
2	Tasmania Berlin	3	1	1	1	3	3	1.000	3		1–2	—	1–1	—
3	Schalke 04	3	1	1	1	5	6	0.833	3		—	—	—	3–2
4	Borussia Neunkirchen	3	0	0	3	4	7	0.571	0		—	0–1	—	—

Source: RSSSF
Rules for classification: 1) Points; 2) Goal ratio.

=== Group 2 ===
Pos	Team	Pld	W	D	L	GF	GA	GR	Pts	Qualification	KOE	SGE	HSV	FKP
1	1. FC Köln	3	3	0	0	14	1	14.000	6	Advance to final	—	—	1–0	10–0
2	Eintracht Frankfurt	3	2	0	1	11	5	2.200	4		1–3	—	—	—
3	Hamburger SV	3	1	0	2	7	6	1.167	2		—	1–2	—	—
4	FK Pirmasens	3	0	0	3	4	24	0.167	0		—	8–1	3–6	—

Source: RSSSF
Rules for classification: 1) Points; 2) Goal ratio.

=== Final ===
Date	Match			Result	Stadium	Attendance
12 May 1962	1. FC Köln	–	1. FC Nürnberg	4–0 (2–0)	Berlin, Olympiastadion	82,000

1. FC Köln:
GK	1	(West Germany) Fritz Ewert
RB	2	(West Germany) Fritz Pott 71'
CB	5	(West Germany) Leo Wilden
LB	3	(West Germany) Karl-Heinz Schnellinger
RH	4	(West Germany) Matthias Hemmersbach
LH	6	(West Germany) Hans Sturm
OR	7	(West Germany) Karl-Heinz Thielen
IR	8	(West Germany) Ernst-Günter Habig 26' 49'
CF	9	(West Germany) Christian Müller
IL	10	(West Germany) Hans Schäfer (c) 22'
OL	11	(West Germany) Christian Breuer
Manager:
(Socialist Federal Republic of Yugoslavia) Zlatko Čajkovski

1. FC Nürnberg:
GK	1	(West Germany) Roland Wabra
RB	2	(West Germany) Paul Derbfuß
CB	5	(West Germany) Ferdinand Wenauer
LB	3	(West Germany) Helmut Hilpert
RH	4	(West Germany) Josef Zenger
LH	6	(West Germany) Stefan Reisch
OR	7	(West Germany) Gustav Flachenecker
IR	8	(West Germany) Max Morlock (c)
CF	9	(West Germany) Heinz Strehl
IL	10	(West Germany) Reinhold Gettinger
OL	11	(West Germany) Richard Albrecht
Manager:
(West Germany) Herbert Widmayer
