= Jürgen Neumann =

German footballer (1941–2002)

- Neumann in the 1970–71 season

Personal information
- Date of birth: 6 December 1941
- Place of birth: Kaiserslautern, Westmark, Germany
- Date of death: 25 December 2002 (aged 61)
- Place of death: McKinney, Texas, U.S.
- Position: Left winger

Youth career
- 1951–1959: 1. FC Kaiserslautern

Senior career*
| Years | Team | Apps | (Gls) |
| 1959–1966 | 1. FC Kaiserslautern | 193 | (38) |
| 1966–1968 | FC Zürich | 77 | (8) |
| 1968–1970 | Daring Club Bruxelles | | |
| 1970–1971 | Arminia Bielefeld | | |

International career
| 1959 | West Germany amateurs | 2 | (0) |
| 1961–1964 | Germany U23 | 4 | (0) |
- * Club domestic league appearances and goals

Jürgen Neumann (6 December 1941 – 25 December 2002) was a German footballer. He played as a midfielder for 1. FC Kaiserslautern and Arminia Bielefeld within Germany throughout the 1960s and 1970s. He also played abroad for FC Zürich in Switzerland and Daring Club Bruxelles in Belgium.

== Club career ==
=== Career with Kaiserslautern (1959–1966) ===
Emerging from 1. FC Kaiserslautern's youth sector, Neumann made his debut during the 1959–60 Oberliga within the same team that contained veterans of the 1954 FIFA World Cup such as Horst Eckel and Werner Liebrich with Neumann immediately finding himself within the Starting XI of the club. He made his debut on 16 August 1959 in an away match against Eintracht Bad Kreuznach at the age of 17. His debut season saw Neumann play in 27 matches with four goals scored across the Oberliga Südwest with Kaiserslautern finishing 5th that season. The following two seasons saw remarkable improvement as Kaiserslautern reached 4th place two times in a row. Neumann's second season also saw Kaiserslautern reach the final of the 1960–61 DFB-Pokal in spite of losing against Werder Bremen on 13 September 1961. The following 1962–63 Oberliga saw Neumann only miss one matchday as he contributed 12 goals in the club winning the Oberliga Südwest that season against their rivals Borussia Neunkirchen, FK Pirmasens and Wormatia Worms. The penultimate 1963 German football championship saw Neumann play in all six matches against Hertha BSC, 1. FC Nuremberg and 1. FC Köln with Köln ultimately going on to the final.

Due to the club's success in the Oberliga, they were a founding member of the inaugural 1963–64 Bundesliga with Neumann becoming indispensable within the team as he made 29 appearances with six goals. He had also been a part of the club's very first Starting XI for their very first Bundesliga match against Eintracht Frankfurt in a 1–1 draw on 24 August 1963 with Neumann himself scoring the 1–0 lead at the 38th minute through a converted penalty. Throughout the mid-1960s, Kaiserslautern fought to remain in the new top-flight of German football. Following the arrival of Bayern Munich during the 1965–66 Bundesliga, Neumann played his final match for Die roten Teufel in a 2–1 home victory on 23 April 1966 with Neumann being sent off in the 38th minute.

=== Career abroad (1966–1970) ===
Following the 1965–66 Bundesliga, he chose to play abroad in Switzerland for FC Zürich, where he was able to celebrate successes against Barcelona, Nottingham Forest and Sporting CP in their impressive run during the 1967–68 Inter-Cities Fairs Cup alongside goalkeeper Karl Grob and midfielder Jakob Kuhn. They were ultimately knocked out from the competition by Scottish club Dundee. His second season with Zürich saw him be part of the winning squad for the 1967–68 Nationalliga A with Neumann firmly establishing himself within the Starting XI. He then continued his career abroad with Belgian club Daring Club Bruxelles where the club were relegated in the 1968–69 Belgian First Division. Despite this initial setback, he helped the club immediately regain promotion for the following 1969–70 Belgian Second Division.

=== Return to the Bundesliga (1970–1971) ===
With Arminia Bielefeld being promoted to the Bundesliga following their success at the 1969–70 Regionalliga, they chose to sign Neumann for their 1970–71 season at the recommendation of manager Egon Piechaczek. During the first matchday on 15 August 1970 in the eventual 3–0 defeat against Borussia Dortmund, he formed the club's main midfield composition alongside Ulrich Braun and Horst Stockhausen. However, his many injuries as well as his age were beginning to catch up with him and Neumann was often used as a substitute. His biggest contribution to the team, however, came during the following 1971 Bundesliga scandal and initially received a lifetime ban on 23 October 1971 and a fine of 15,000 DM with a Neumann being sued in 1972 over his involvement soon after. Despite being pardoned on 20 August 1976, because he failed to pay his fine, got his player license revoked on 11 December 1978.
