= All-time Bundesliga table =

Ranking of German professional football clubs

The All-time Bundesliga table (German: Ewige Tabelle der Bundesliga) is a ranking of all German football clubs based on their performance in the Bundesliga, the top division of German football. In this ranking 3 points are awarded for a win, 1 for a draw, and 0 for a loss, although the Bundesliga awarded 2 points for a win until the 1994–95 season.

In the 1983–84 season, Bayern Munich took the lead from 1. FC Köln, which had led the standings since the inception of the Bundesliga in 1963. The ranking includes the 58 teams which have played in the Bundesliga since its inception (in the 2026–27 season, Elversberg joined the Bundesliga to become the league's 59th team). Hamburger SV was the last club to have participated in all seasons, but they were relegated after the 2017–18 season.

Clubs highlighted in blue and green play in the Bundesliga in the 2025–26 season, which marks the 63rd season since inception. Clubs highlighted in yellow were members of the inaugural 1963–64 Bundesliga which do not currently play in the Bundesliga.

This list is current as of 16 May 2026, after the 2025–26 season.

== Table ==
As of the end of 2025–26 Bundesliga.

Key

Currently in the Bundesliga
Founding members currently in the Bundesliga
Founding members of the Bundesliga

Rank	Club	Years^{a}	Cons^{b}	Pld	W	D	L	GF	GA	GD	Pts	C^{c}	BR^{d}	First	Latest	Current league
1	Bayern Munich	62	62	2,078	1,265	443	370	4,746	2,265	+2,471	4,238	35	1	1965–66	2025–26	1. Bundesliga
2	Borussia Dortmund	60	51	2,002	926	494	582	3,668	2,797	+871	3,272	5	1	1963–64	2025–26	1. Bundesliga
3	Werder Bremen	62	5	2,070	843	518	709	3,400	3,070	+330	3,047	4	1	1963–64	2025–26	1. Bundesliga
4	VfB Stuttgart	60	7	2,002	821	487	694	3,324	2,940	+384	2,950	3	1	1963–64	2025–26	1. Bundesliga
5	Borussia Mönchengladbach	59	19	1,976	786	521	669	3,335	2,910	+425	2,879	5	1	1965–66	2025–26	1. Bundesliga
6	Hamburger SV	56	1	1,900	755	506	639	2,977	2,716	+261	2,771	3	1	1963–64	2025–26	1. Bundesliga
7	Eintracht Frankfurt^{f}	58	15	1,934	712	505	717	3,058	2,995	+63	2,639	0	3	1963–64	2025–26	1. Bundesliga
8	Bayer Leverkusen	48	48	1,602	713	430	459	2,771	2,121	+650	2,569	1	1	1979–80	2025–26	1. Bundesliga
9	Schalke 04	54	0	1,832	700	463	669	2,642	2,678	−36	2,563	0	2	1963–64	2022–23	1. Bundesliga
10	1. FC Köln	53	1	1,798	683	467	648	2,880	2,719	+161	2,516	2	1	1963–64	2025–26	1. Bundesliga
11	1. FC Kaiserslautern^{e}	44	0	1,492	575	372	545	2,348	2,344	+4	2,094	2	1	1963–64	2011–12	2. Bundesliga
12	Hertha BSC	40	0	1,352	477	340	535	1,887	2,102	−215	1,771	0	2	1963–64	2022–23	2. Bundesliga
13	VfL Bochum	39	0	1,296	391	336	569	1,755	2,152	−397	1,509	0	5	1971–72	2024–25	2. Bundesliga
14	VfL Wolfsburg	30	30	986	366	252	368	1,478	1,465	+13	1,350	1	1	1997–98	2025–26	2. Bundesliga
15	1. FC Nürnberg	33	0	1,118	344	286	488	1,428	1,794	−366	1,318	1	1	1963–64	2018–19	2. Bundesliga
16	Hannover 96	30	0	1,016	308	250	458	1,385	1,734	−349	1,174	0	4	1964–65	2018–19	2. Bundesliga
17	MSV Duisburg	28	0	948	296	259	393	1,291	1,520	−229	1,147	0	2	1963–64	2007–08	3. Liga
18	SC Freiburg	27	11	884	293	227	364	1,156	1,398	−242	1,106	0	3	1993–94	2025–26	1. Bundesliga
19	Fortuna Düsseldorf	25	0	854	264	232	358	1,245	1,518	−273	1,024	0	3	1966–67	2019–20	3. Liga
20	Karlsruher SC	24	0	812	241	230	341	1,093	1,408	−315	953	0	6	1963–64	2008–09	2. Bundesliga
21	Eintracht Braunschweig	21	0	706	242	177	287	937	1,086	−149	903	1	1	1963–64	2013–14	2. Bundesliga
22	1860 Munich	20	0	672	238	170	264	1,022	1,059	−37	884	1	1	1963–64	2003–04	Regionalliga Bayern (IV)
23	Mainz 05	21	18	680	225	180	275	903	1010	−107	855	0	5	2004–05	2025–26	1. Bundesliga
24	TSG Hoffenheim	19	19	612	218	167	227	988	981	+7	821	0	3	2008–09	2025–26	1. Bundesliga
25	Arminia Bielefeld^{g}	19	0	612	167	160	285	698	988	−290	661	0	8	1970–71	2021–22	2. Bundesliga
26	RB Leipzig	11	11	340	180	82	78	659	402	+257	622	0	2	2016–17	2025–26	1. Bundesliga
27	FC Augsburg	16	16	510	153	131	226	622	818	−196	590	0	5	2011–12	2025–26	1. Bundesliga
28	KFC Uerdingen	14	0	476	138	129	209	644	844	−200	543	0	3	1975–76	1995–96	Oberliga Niederrhein (V)
29	Hansa Rostock	12	0	412	124	107	181	492	621	−129	479	0	6	1991–92	2007–08	3. Liga
30	Union Berlin	8	8	236	87	61	90	304	350	−46	322	0	4	2019–20	2025–26	1. Bundesliga
31	FC St. Pauli	11	3	340	72	96	172	353	586	−233	312	0	10	1977–78	2025–26	2. Bundesliga
32	Waldhof Mannheim	7	0	238	71	72	95	299	378	−79	285	0	6	1983–84	1989–90	3. Liga
33	Kickers Offenbach	7	0	238	77	51	110	368	486	−118	282	0	7	1968–69	1983–84	Regionalliga Südwest (IV)
34	Rot-Weiss Essen	7	0	238	61	79	98	346	483	−137	262	0	8	1966–67	1976–77	3. Liga
35	Energie Cottbus	6	0	204	56	43	105	211	338	−127	211	0	13	2000–01	2008–09	2. Bundesliga
36	Alemannia Aachen	4	0	136	43	28	65	186	270	−84	157	0	2	1967–68	2006–07	3. Liga
37	Wattenscheid 09	4	0	140	34	48	58	186	248	−62	150	0	11	1989–90	1993–94	Oberliga Westfalen (V)
38	1. FC Saarbrücken	5	0	166	32	48	86	202	336	−134	144	0	14	1963–64	1992–93	3. Liga
39	Dynamo Dresden^{h}	4	0	140	33	45	62	132	211	−79	140	0	13	1991–92	1994–95	2. Bundesliga
40	Rot-Weiß Oberhausen	4	0	136	36	31	69	182	281	−99	139	0	14	1969–70	1972–73	Regionalliga West (IV)
41	Darmstadt 98	5	0	170	31	41	98	182	359	−177	134	0	14	1978–79	2023–24	2. Bundesliga
42	Wuppertaler SV	3	0	102	25	27	50	136	200	−64	102	0	4	1972–73	1974–75	Regionalliga West (IV)
43	1. FC Heidenheim	3	3	102	24	25	53	128	191	−63	97	0	8	2023–24	2025–26	2. Bundesliga
44	Borussia Neunkirchen	3	0	98	25	18	55	109	223	−114	93	0	10	1964–65	1967–68	Saarlandliga (VI)
45	FC 08 Homburg	3	0	102	21	27	54	103	200	−97	90	0	16	1986–87	1989–90	Regionalliga Südwest (IV)
46	SpVgg Unterhaching	2	0	68	20	19	29	75	101	−26	79	0	10	1999–2000	2000–01	Regionalliga Bayern (IV)
47	Stuttgarter Kickers	2	0	72	20	17	35	94	132	−38	77	0	17	1988–89	1991–92	Regionalliga Südwest (IV)
48	FC Ingolstadt	2	0	68	18	18	32	69	99	−30	72	0	11	2015–16	2016–17	3. Liga
49	SC Paderborn	2	0	68	11	18	39	68	139	−71	51	0	18	2014–15	2019–20	1. Bundesliga
50	Tennis Borussia Berlin	2	0	68	11	16	41	85	174	−89	49	0	17	1974–75	1976–77	NOFV-Oberliga Nord (V)
51	Greuther Fürth	2	0	68	7	18	43	54	142	−88	39	0	18	2012–13	2021–22	2. Bundesliga
52	SSV Ulm	1	0	34	9	8	17	36	62	−26	35	0	16	1999–2000	1999–2000	3. Liga
53	SC Fortuna Köln	1	0	34	8	9	17	46	79	−33	33	0	17	1973–74	1973–74	Regionalliga West (IV)
54	Preußen Münster	1	0	30	7	9	14	34	52	−18	30	0	15	1963–64	1963–64	3. Liga
55	Holstein Kiel	1	0	34	6	7	21	49	80	−31	25	0	17	2024–25	2024–25	2. Bundesliga
56	Blau-Weiß 1890 Berlin	1	0	34	3	12	19	36	76	−40	21	0	18	1986–87	1986–87	defunct
57	VfB Leipzig	1	0	34	3	11	20	32	69	−37	20	0	18	1993–94	1993–94	Regionalliga Nordost (IV)
58	Tasmania 1900 Berlin	1	0	34	2	4	28	15	108	−93	10	0	18	1965–66	1965–66	defunct

^aYears includes current season.
^bNumber of consecutive seasons in the Bundesliga, counting the current one.
^cNumber of championships.
^dBest result at the end of a season.
^eIn the 2003–04 season, 1. FC Kaiserslautern received a three-point penalty.
^fIn the 1999–2000 season, Eintracht Frankfurt received a two-point penalty.
^gIn the 1971–72 season, Arminia Bielefeld's record was expunged as a penalty.
^hIn the 1993–94 season, Dynamo Dresden received a four-point penalty.
