= Lothar Geisler =

German footballer (1936–2019)

Personal information
- Full name: Lothar Geisler
- Date of birth: December 8, 1936
- Place of birth: Dortmund, Germany
- Date of death: 28 April 2019 (aged 82)
- Positions: Defender; midfielder

Youth career
- 1948–1950: VfL Kemminghausen
- 1950–1954: TuS Eving-Lindenhorst

Senior career*
Years	Team	Apps	(Gls)
1954–1957	TuS Eving-Lindenhorst		
1957–1959	VfL Bochum	51	(0)
1959–1960	Borussia Dortmund II		
1960–1967	Borussia Dortmund	117	(1)
1967–1968	TuS Eving-Lindenhorst		

Managerial career
- 1967–1968: TuS Eving-Lindenhorst
- * Club domestic league appearances and goals

Lothar Geisler (8 December 1936 – 28 April 2019) was a German footballer.

== Career ==
=== Statistics ===
Club performance			League		Cup		Continental		Other		Total	
Season	Club	League	Apps	Goals	Apps	Goals	Apps	Goals	Apps	Goals	Apps	Goals
West Germany			League		DFB-Pokal		Europe		Other^{1}		Total	
1954–55	TuS Eving-Lindenhorst	Landesliga Westfalen			—		—		—			
1955–56	TuS Eving-Lindenhorst	Landesliga Westfalen			—		—		—			
1956–57	TuS Eving-Lindenhorst	Landesliga Westfalen			—		—		—			
1957–58	VfL Bochum	Oberliga West	23	0	—		—		—		23	0
1958–59	VfL Bochum	Oberliga West	28	0	—		—		—		28	0
1959–60	Borussia Dortmund II				—		—		—			
1960–61	Borussia Dortmund	Oberliga West	26	0	—		—		5	0	31	0
1961–62	Borussia Dortmund	Oberliga West	13	0	—		—		—		13	0
1962–63	Borussia Dortmund	Oberliga West	24	0	4	0	—		7	0	35	0
1963–64	Borussia Dortmund	Bundesliga	27	0	1	0	7	0	—		35	0
1964–65	Borussia Dortmund	Bundesliga	9	0	0	0	1	0	—		10	0
1965–66	Borussia Dortmund	Bundesliga	17	1	1	0	0	0	—		18	1
1966–67	Borussia Dortmund	Bundesliga	1	0	0	0	0	0	—		1	0
1967–68	TuS Eving-Lindenhorst	Verbandsliga Westfalen			—		—		—			
Total	West Germany				6	0	8	0	12	0		
Career total					6	0	8	0	12	0		

^{1} 1960–61 and 1962–63 include the German football championship playoffs.
