= Melbourne Aces all-time roster =

The Melbourne Aces all-time roster is a list of people who have played at least one regular season game^{#} for the Melbourne Aces, of the Australian Baseball League, along with their primary position.

== Aces All-time roster ==
	Name	Position	Bats	Throws	Ref
(United States)	Zachary Arneson	Pitcher	Right	Right	
(Australia)	Nathan Aron	Outfield	Right	Right	
(Australia)	Mitchell Ayres	Catcher	Left	Right	
(Australia)	Kyle Bedford	Pitcher	Right	Right	
(Australia)	Liam Bedford	Catcher	Right	Right	
(Australia)	Elliot Biddle	Outfield	Right	Left	
(Australia)	Adam Blackley	Pitcher	Left	Left	
(Australia)	Travis Blackley	Pitcher	Left	Left	
(Australia)	Matthew Blackmore	Pitcher	Right	Right	
(Australia)	Adam Bright	Pitcher	Left	Left	
(United States)	Bubbie Buzachero	Pitcher	Right	Right	
(Australia)	Blake Cunningham	Pitcher	Right	Right	
(Australia)	Ryan Dale	3rd Base	Right	Right	
(United States)	Kevin David	Catcher	Right	Right	
(Australia)	Josh Davies	1st Base	Right	Right	
(Australia)	Alex Da Silva	Pitcher	Right	Right	
(Australia)	Tom Dicker	Outfield/2nd Base	Right	Right	
(Australia)	Hayden Dingle	1st Base	Left	Left	
(Australia)	John Edwards	Outfield/1st Base	Right	Right	
(Australia)	Cameron Forbes	Pitcher	Right	Right	
(Australia)	Darryl George	3rd Base	Right	Right	
(Australia)	Sam Gibbons	Pitcher	Left	Right	
(Australia)	Cody Hams	Pitcher	Left	Left	
(Australia)	Brad Harman	2nd Base	Right	Right	
(Japan)	Itaru Hashimoto	Outfield	Left	Right	
(Australia)	Donovan Hendricks	Pitcher		Left	
(Australia)	Joshua Hendricks	Catcher/1st Base	Right	Right	
(United States)	Brad Hertzler	Pitcher	Right	Left	
(Japan)	Masumi Hoshino	Pitcher	Left	Left	
(Australia)	Justin Huber	Outfield	Right	Right	
(Australia)	John Hussey	Pitcher	Right	Right	
(Japan)	Takahiro Ijyuin		Right	Right	
(Australia)	James Beresford	Short Stop/2nd Base	Left	Right	
(United States)	Jeff Jamnik	Pitcher	Right	Right	
(Japan)	Yoshiyuki Kamei	Outfield/3rd Base	Left	Right	
(Japan)	Norihito Kaneto	Pitcher	Left	Left	
(Australia)	Grant Karlsen	Catcher	Right	Right	
(Australia)	Jon Kennedy	Pitcher	Left	Left	
(Japan)	Yusei Kikuchi	Pitcher	Left	Left	
(Japan)	Fumikazu Kimura	Pitcher	Right	Right	
(Japan)	Hirotaka Koishi	Pitcher	Left	Left	
(Australia)	Matthew Lawman		Right	Right	
(Australia)	Ben Leslie	Outfield	Right	Right	
(Australia)	Jamie Lethborg	Pitcher	Right	Right	
(Australia)	Shane Lindsay	Pitcher	Right	Right	
(Australia)	Andrew Mann	Pitcher	Right	Right	
(United States)	Nicholas Martin	Pitcher	Left	Right	
(Australia)	Glenn Mascoll		Right	Right	
(Australia)	Brendan McDonald	Pitcher	Right	Right	
(Australia)	Tristan McDonald	Catcher	Right	Right	
(Australia)	Daniel McGrath	Pitcher	Right	Left	
(Australia)	Dean McIntyre	Pitcher	Right	Left	
(United States)	David Miller	Pitcher	Left	Right	
(Japan)	Shota Nakata	Catcher	Right	Right	
(Japan)	Yuta Nakazaki	Pitcher			
(Japan)	Tetsu Nishikawa	Pitcher	Right	Right	
(Japan)	Jumpei Ono	Pitcher	Right	Right	
(Australia)	Jamie Papanicolaou	Pitcher			
(United States)	Dominic Ramos	Short Stop	Right	Right	
(United States)	Kevin Reese	Pitcher	Right	Right	
(Australia)	Jarryd Rogers	Catcher	Switch	Right	
(Australia)	Andrew Russell	Pitcher	Right	Right	
(Australia)	Paul Rutgers	Outfield	Right	Right	
(Australia)	Aaron Sayers	Short Stop	Left	Right	
(Australia)	Jacob Sheldon-Collins		Switch	Right	
(Germany)	Markus Solbach	Pitcher	Right	Right	
(Australia)	Russell Spear	Pitcher	Right	Right	
(Australia)	Nicholas Spence	1st Base	Left	Right	
(Australia)	Brett Tamburrino		Switch	Right	
(United States)	Carlo Testa	Outfield	Left	Left	
(Australia)	Lewis Thorpe	Pitcher	Right	Left	
(Australia)	Andrew Tierney	2nd Base	Left	Right	
(Australia)	Scott Wearne	Utility	Left	Right	
(Australia)	Paul Weichard	Outfield/1st Base	Switch	Left	
(Australia)	David Whigham		Right	Right	
(Australia)	Campbell Wiggins	Pitcher	Right	Right	
(Australia)	Matt Wilson	Pitcher	Left	Left	
(Australia)	Greg Wiltshire	Pitcher	Right	Right	
(South Korea)	Hyunki Yun	2nd Base	Right	Right	
	Current as of 16 November 2012.				

== Aces All-time managers ==
	Name	Tenure
(Australia)	Phil Dale	2010-Current
	Current as of 16 November 2012.	

=== Aces All-time coaching staff ===
	Name	Tenure
(Australia)	Phil Allen	2010-Current
(Australia)	Stephen Black	2012-Current
(Australia)	Neil Burke	2010-Current
(Australia)	David Clarkson	2010
(Australia)	Lee Hogan	2010-2011
(Australia)	Mitsuharu Nagayama	2012-Current
(Australia)	Jonathan Schuerholz	2012-Current
(Australia)	Damian Shanahan	2010-Current
(Australia)	Russ Spear	2012-Current
	Current as of 16 November 2012.	
