= Hans Sturm =

Hans Sturm may refer to:

- Hans Sturm (actor) (1874–1933), German actor, screenwriter and playwright
- Hans Sturm (footballer) (1935–2007), German football player
