= Leo Wilden =

German footballer (1936–2022)

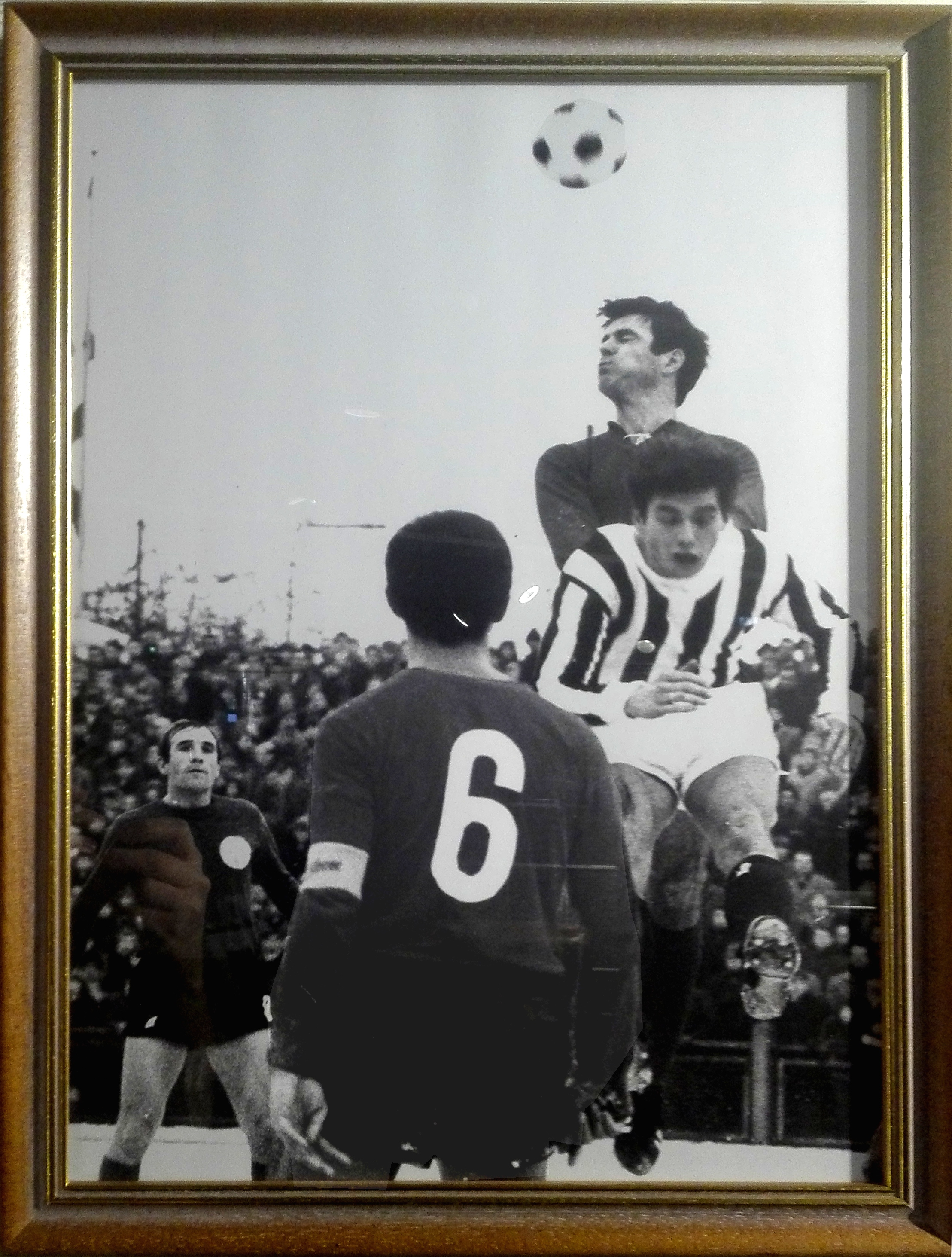
- Wilden with Bayer Leverkusen

Personal information
- Date of birth: 3 July 1936
- Place of birth: Düren, Germany
- Date of death: 5 May 2022 (aged 85)
- Place of death: Cologne, Germany
- Height: 1.80 m (5 ft 11 in)
- Position: Defender

Youth career
- VfL Köln 99

Senior career*
Years	Team	Apps	(Gls)
1958–1966	1. FC Köln	182	(2)
1966–1969	Bayer Leverkusen		
1968–1969	Sint-Truiden	1	(0)

International career
1960–1964	West Germany	15	(0)
- * Club domestic league appearances and goals

Leo Wilden (3 July 1936 – 5 May 2022) was a German footballer who played as a defender. He featured in two 1962 World Cup Qualification matches for the West Germany national team.

== Career ==
Wilden was a centre-half of 1. FC Köln between 1958 and 1966, during which he won the West German football championship in 1962 and 1964. In that period, Wilden was also a standard centre-half of West Germany, succeeding Herbert Erhardt, who had retired after the 1962 World Cup. Wilden won 15 caps. Wilden played also one game in the Belgian competition with Sint-Truidense VV in 1968–69 season (the last game of the season on 11 May 1969).

As a player, Wilden was noted for his outstanding positional play, great vision and hard tackling. He could also provide offensive impetus if needed. Some pundits compared him to the 1930s player Ludwig Goldbrunner.

In 1966 Wilden moved to Bayer Leverkusen, where he retired in 1971. He later worked as coach of Pulheimer SC and SC West Köln and was voted vice chairman of SC West Köln in 1971. He later ran several tobacco shops in Cologne.

== Honours ==
1. FC Köln

- German football championship: 1961–62, 1963–64
