= Markus Solbach =

German professional baseball pitcher (born 1991)

Bonn Capitals – No. 25
- Pitcher / Coach
- Born: 26 August 1991 (age 34); Dormagen, Germany
- Bats: Right Throws: Right
- Stats at Baseball Reference

Markus Solbach (born 26 August 1991) is a German former professional baseball pitcher. The right-hander is also active for the German national baseball team. He played for Team Germany in the 2019 European Baseball Championship, in which they came in sixth. He is currently a coach for the Bonn Capitals of the Baseball-Bundesliga.

== Career ==
=== Minnesota Twins ===
Solbach's baseball career started at the Pulheim Gophers, where he played until 2011 as a pitcher, before he signed a professional contract with the Minnesota Twins organization on 19 February 2011. He made his professional debut with the rookie-level GCL Twins, where he posted a 3–3 record and 1.91 ERA in 15 games. He remained with the team for the 2012 season as well, posting a 5.82 ERA with 14 strikeouts in 17.0 innings of work. Solbach began the 2013 season with the GCL Twins, but was released in late July, after logging a 0.96 ERA in five games.

=== Windy City ThunderBolts ===
On 19 July 2013, Solbach signed with the Windy City ThunderBolts of the independent Frontier League. Solbach posted a 5–1 record and 3.27 ERA in 10 games with the team to finish the 2013 season. He began the 2014 season with the team, recording a 0.86 ERA in his first three games.

=== Arizona Diamondbacks ===
On 2 June 2014, Solbach's contract was purchased by the Arizona Diamondbacks organization. He split the remainder of the year between the rookie-level Missoula Osprey, the Low-A Hillsboro Hops, and the Single-A South Bend Silver Hawks, accumulating a 6–6 record and 4.03 ERA in 16 games between the three teams. Solbach split the 2015 season between the Single-A Kane County Cougars and the High-A Visalia Rawhide, pitching to a cumulative 11–6 record and 3.40 ERA with 73 strikeouts in 150.2 innings of work. On 28 March 2016, Solbach was released by the Diamondbacks organization.

=== Rockland Boulders ===
Following his release from Arizona, Solbach signed with the Rockland Boulders of the Can-Am League. In 10 games with Rockland, Solbach posted a 6–2 record and 2.43 ERA with 52 strikeouts.

=== Arizona Diamondbacks (second stint) ===
On 8 July 2016, Solbach's contract was purchased by the Arizona Diamondbacks organization. He returned to the High-A Visalia Rawhide, and registered a 5–2 record and 3.56 ERA in 12 appearances to finish out the year. Solbach elected free agency following the season on 7 November.

=== Rockland Boulders (second stint) ===
Solbach signed with the Rockland Boulders of the Can-Am League for the 2017 season. In 19 appearances, all of them starts, with Rockland, Solbach recorded an 11–4 record and 3.60 ERA with 95 strikeouts in 122.2 innings pitched.

=== Bonn Capitals ===
In 2018, Solbach played for the Bonn Capitals of the Bundesliga, finishing with a 0.38 ERA and leading the club to their first Bundesliga title.

=== Los Angeles Dodgers ===
On 3 January 2019, Solbach signed a minor league contract with the Los Angeles Dodgers organization. Following spring training, he was assigned to extended spring training. He began the season with the Double-A Tulsa Drillers, and also spent time with the AZL Dodgers, posting a 5–3 record and 3.25 ERA in 14 games with the two teams. Solbach did not play in a game for the Dodgers organization in 2020 due to the cancellation of the minor league season because of the COVID-19 pandemic.

With the absence of the minor league season, Solbach played for T & A San Marino of the Italian Baseball League, with whom he posted a 3–0 record and 0.30 ERA with 53 strikeouts in 30.1 innings of work. Solbach was assigned to the Triple-A Oklahoma City Dodgers to begin the 2021 season and pitched in 16 games for them (9 starts) with an 0–6 record and 8.18 ERA before making one appearance with the Drillers at the end of the season. He elected free agency on 7 November 2021.

=== Detroit Tigers ===
On 24 November 2021, Solbach signed a minor league deal with the Detroit Tigers. Solbach made 15 starts for the Double–A Erie SeaWolves in 2022, and also started two games for the Triple–A Toledo Mud Hens. In 74.0 innings, he registered a 4–5 record and 4.01 ERA with 71 strikeouts. He elected free agency following the season on 10 November 2022.

== International career ==
Solbach has played several seasons in the Australian Baseball League, his first being the 2011-12 season where he played for the Melbourne Aces, before moving to the Sydney Blue Sox for the 2013-14 season.

Following his 2018 Bundesliga performance, in the 2018-19 Australian Baseball League season he played for Adelaide Bite, putting up career best figures of 5–3 with a 1.10 ERA. He was subsequently named the league's joint MVP with Tim Kennelly, the first time someone other than an Australian or American had won the award.

== Coaching career ==
On 15 December 2022, Solbach was hired by the Bonn Capitals of the German Baseball Bundesliga to serve as a base coach for the 2023 season.
