= Andreas Haas =

German retired footballer (born 1982)

Personal information
- Date of birth: 20 April 1982 (age 44)
- Place of birth: Homburg, West Germany
- Height: 1.78 m (5 ft 10 in)
- Position: Striker

Youth career
- SV Reiskirchen
- SG Erbach
- 1. FC Kaiserslautern
- FC 08 Homburg
- –2000: 1. FC Saarbrücken

Senior career*
Years	Team	Apps	(Gls)
2000–2003	1. FC Saarbrücken	6	(0)
2003–2006	FC 08 Homburg	92	(62)
2006–2007	1899 Hoffenheim	1	(1)
2007–2008	FK Pirmasens	25	(11)
2008	Hessen Kassel	14	(4)
2008–2010	SV Elversberg	39	(11)
2011	FC 08 Homburg	17	(4)
2011–2012	Palatia Limbach	7	(5)
2012–2013	Halberg Brebach	16	(5)
2013	SVN Zweibrücken	22	(20)
2013–2014	FK Pirmasens	26	(19)
2014–2015	Borussia Neunkirchen	28	(10)
2015–2016	SG Erbach		
2016	VfB Waldmohr		
2016–2017	SG Erbach	22	(18)
Total		315	(170)

International career
	Germany U-16	9	(3)

Managerial career
- 2011–2012: Palatia Limbach (assistant)
- * Club domestic league appearances and goals

Andreas Haas (born 20 April 1982) is a German retired footballer who played as a striker.

== Career ==
Haas played youth football for SV Reiskirchen, SG Erbach and 1. FC Kaiserslautern, before getting his chance in professional football with 1. FC Saarbrücken. He made his debut for the club in October 2000, aged 18, in a 2. Bundesliga match against FC St. Pauli, replacing Dino Toppmöller in a 2–2 draw. He made four more appearances during the 2000–01 season, but suffered an injury after just one game in the following season, and didn't play for FCS again, not featuring at all in his final year with the club, now relegated to the Regionalliga Süd. In 2000, he joined his hometown club, FC 08 Homburg of the Oberliga Südwest. He scored six goals in his first season with the club, but the next two years proved to be hugely successful – he scored 30 and 26 league goals respectively, both enough to make him the division's top scorer.

This form earned Haas a move back up to the Regionalliga Süd, with ambitious TSG Hoffenheim, but in six months with the club he only made one appearance – a 1–1 draw with SV Elversberg in which he scored. In January 2007 he joined FK Pirmasens, where his four goals in eight appearances could not stop the club being relegated from the Regionalliga. After a further six months with Pirmasens, he was back in the Regionalliga, joining KSV Hessen Kassel. At the end of the season he returned to Saarland, spending two years with SV Elversberg before being released in July 2010. After six months out of the game, he returned to FC Homburg in January 2011. He scored four goals in seventeen appearances for the club, but was unable to prevent them being relegated from the Regionalliga West, so he left in summer 2011 and signed for local amateur side FC Palatia Limbach. A year later he signed for SC Halberg Brebach.

In January 2013, Haas signed for SVN Zweibrücken, where he scored nineteen goals in seventeen appearances to help the club earn promotion to the Regionalliga Südwest. He returned to FK Pirmasens shortly after the beginning of the 2013–14 season, during which he achieved another promotion, scoring 19 goals, before dropping back down a level again to sign for Borussia Neunkirchen in July 2014.
