= Abdul Kizmaz =

German footballer

Personal information
- Date of birth: 10 May 1992 (age 34)
- Place of birth: Neunkirchen, Germany
- Height: 1.72 m (5 ft 7 1/2 in)
- Position: Attacking midfielder

Team information
- Current team: Preußen Merchweiler

Youth career
- Landsweiler-Reden
- Preußen Merchweiler
- –2010: 1. FC Saarbrücken

Senior career*
Years	Team	Apps	(Gls)
2010–2012	1. FC Saarbrücken II	38	(10)
2010–2012	1. FC Saarbrücken	9	(0)
2012–2016	Borussia Neunkirchen	94	(6)
2016–2017	FSG Bous	16	(6)
2017–2018	SV Saar 05	25	(0)
2018–2020	SG Knopp/Wiesbach	17	(0)
2020–	Preußen Merchweiler	5	(0)

Managerial career
- 2018–2020: SG Knopp/Wiesbach
- * Club domestic league appearances and goals as of 20 February 2021

Abdul Kizmaz (born 10 May 1992) is a German footballer who plays as a midfielder for SV Preußen Merchweiler. He came through 1. FC Saarbrücken's youth setup, and made his first-team debut in October 2010, when he replaced Nico Zimmermann in a 3rd Liga match against VfR Aalen. He was released by Saarbrücken in 2012 and signed for Borussia Neunkirchen.
