= Zlatko Čajkovski =

Croatian footballer and manager (1923–1998)

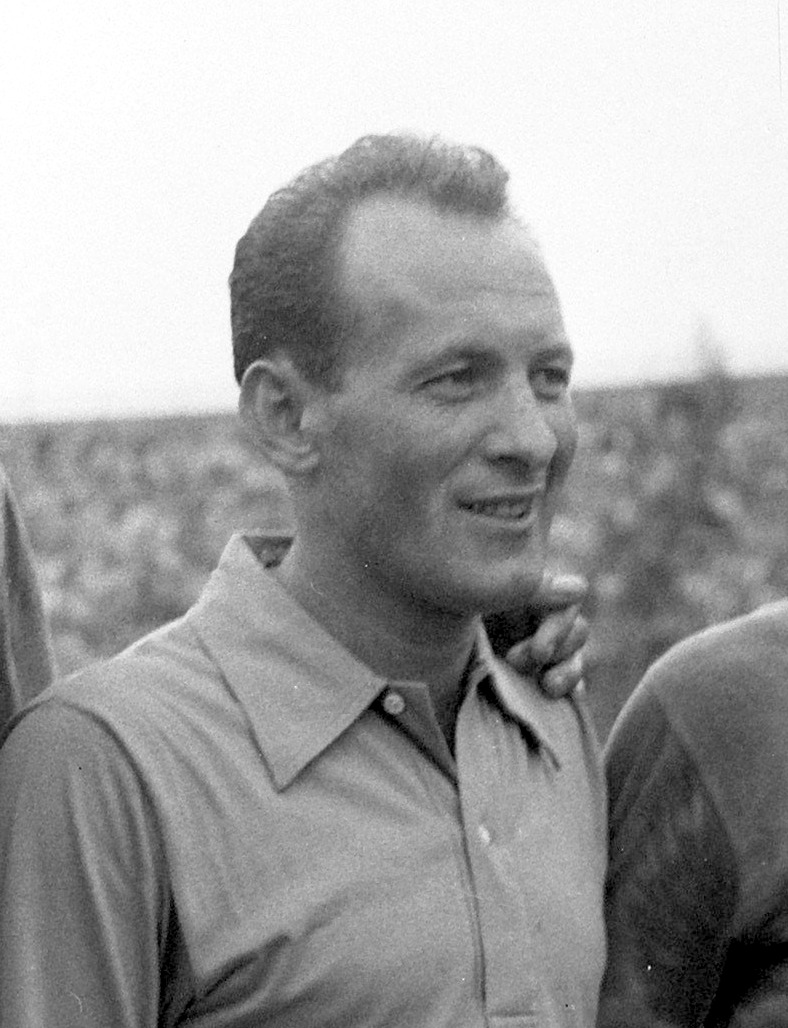
- Čajkovski in 1953

Personal information
- Date of birth: 24 November 1923
- Place of birth: Zagreb, Kingdom of Serbs, Croats and Slovenes
- Date of death: 27 July 1998 (aged 74)
- Place of death: Munich, Germany
- Height: 1.63 m (5 ft 4 in)
- Position: Defensive midfielder

Senior career*
Years	Team	Apps	(Gls)
1939–1945	HAŠK		
1946–1955	Partizan	156	(19)
1955–1958	1. FC Köln	53	(5)
1958–1960	Hapoel Haifa		

International career
1942–1943	Croatia	2	(0)
1946–1955	Yugoslavia	55	(7)

Managerial career
- 1961–1963: 1. FC Köln
- 1963–1968: Bayern Munich
- 1968–1969: Hannover 96
- 1970: Kickers Offenbach
- 1970–1971: Dinamo Zagreb
- 1971–1973: 1. FC Nürnberg
- 1973–1975: 1. FC Köln
- 1976: Kickers Offenbach
- 1977–1978: AEK Athens
- 1978–1980: FC Zürich
- 1980: FC Grenchen
- 1981: Grazer AK
- 1982: AEK Athens
- 1983–1984: Apollon Kalamarias
Medal record
Men's Football
Representing Yugoslavia
Olympic Games
Silver medal – second place	1948 London	Team
Silver medal – second place	1952 Helsinki	Team
- * Club domestic league appearances and goals

Zlatko "Čik" Čajkovski (24 November 1923 – 27 July 1998) was a Yugoslav and Croatian football player and coach. His brother, Željko Čajkovski, was a footballer as well. Normally a defensive midfielder, Čajkovski was renowned for his tremendous physical condition and marking ability and is considered to be one of the finest Yugoslav footballers. Despite his normally defensive role he was also a fine passer and possessed top-class technical ability.

== Club career ==
On club level Čajkovski played initially for HAŠK. After World War II, he moved to the newly-established Partizan.

=== Partizan ===
Čajkovski was one of the star ("most eminent") players in first 10 years of club's history. He went on to win two Yugoslav league titles (1946/47, 1948/49) and three Yugoslav Cup (Marshal Tito Cup) trophies (1947, 1952, 1954).

Čajkovski amassed 391 appearances (156 in the league), scored 97 goals and wore the captain armband, in his closing years with Partizan.

"Čik" played as many as 80 international friendlies for the Belgrade side, including a highly rated South American tour in the winter of 1953/54.

=== Köln ===
After Partizan, Čajkovski found employment abroad. He first went to West Germany in 1955. He decided and signs for FC Köln, and for the next three seasons he played for this German club under the guidance of coach Hennes Weisweiler. Immediately in the first season, he played in 24 games and scored two goals. He played a total of 57 league games and scoring seven league goals during that time. He played three games in the German Cup and scored one goal.

== International career ==
Between 1946 and 1955 he played 55 times for the Yugoslavia national team scoring seven goals. Participating at the Olympic Games 1948 and 1952, he won the silver medal on both occasions. The final of the 1952 tournament in Helsinki was lost against the then ascending Hungarian side of the Magic Magyars.

He also participated in the FIFA World Cups of 1950 and 1954. In 1950, Yugoslavia only lost to hosts Brazil in the group phase, during which Čajkovski scored two goals versus Mexico. In 1954, Yugoslavia drew in the group phase against Brazil, but were eliminated in the subsequent quarter final match against eventual tournament winners Germany. In 1953, Čajkovski was one of four Croatian players on the FIFA Select XI who played against England. His final international was a May 1955 friendly match against Scotland.

== Managerial career ==
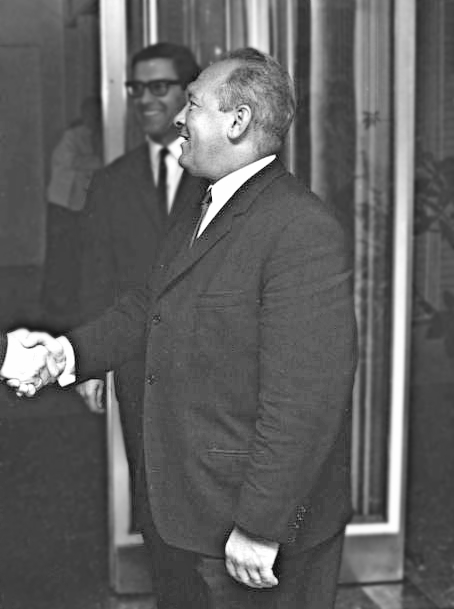
Čik Čajkovski

Čajkovski acquired his coaching licence under Hennes Weisweiler at the German Sports Academy in Cologne. His first appointment were in Israel, Turkey and the Netherlands.

His first great success was the German Championship 1962 with 1. FC Köln. In 1963 he took over the reins at FC Bayern Munich, which he guided from the second division into the first division, two wins in the German Cup and the win in the European Cup Winners Cup final against Rangers FC from Glasgow in 1967. In this period he formed around the goalkeeper Sepp Maier, Franz Beckenbauer and, the later legendary, striker Gerd Müller, then all in their very early twenties, one of the top teams in Europe and the whole world.

Later, Čajkovski coached Hannover 96, 1. FC Nürnberg, Kickers Offenbach, which he took as a second division club to win the German Cup in 1970. After NK Dinamo Zagreb and 1. FC Nürnberg, he had another stint 1. FC Köln and also returned once more to Kickers Offenbach. In 1977 he went to Greece to replace František Fadrhonc at the bench of AEK Athens, where he won the double. He then went to Switzerland to coach FC Zürich (1978–1980) and FC Grenchen (1980), having his final assignment with Grazer AK in 1981. After that, he coached AEK Athens (1982) and Apollon Kalamarias (1983–84).

== Style of play ==
Although Čajkovski played as a defensive midfielder, he was equally good in the offense and, due to his exceptional stamina and tenacity, he was able to cover virtually the entire field. His unusual zigzag dribbling technique made his moves difficult to predict for the opposing players. Čajkovski was also very skilled in heading the ball, despite his short stature.

== Career statistics ==
=== International goals ===
#	Date	Venue	Opponent	Score	Result	Competition
1.	7 October 1946	Tirana, Albania	Albania	3–2	3–2	Balkan Cup
2.	4 July 1948	Sofia, Bulgaria	Bulgaria	3–1	3–1	Balkan Cup
3.	19 June 1949	Oslo, Norway	Norway	3–1	3–1	Friendly
4.	18 September 1949	Tel-Aviv, Israel	Israel	3–0	5–2	1950 FIFA World Cup qualification
5.	22 July 1952	Tampere, Finland	Soviet Union	3–1	3–1	1952 Summer Olympics
6.	25 July 1952	Helsinki, Finland	Denmark	1–0	5–3	1952 Summer Olympics
7.	29 July 1952	Helsinki, Finland	Germany	3–1	3–1	1952 Summer Olympics

== Managerial statistics ==
As of 4 September 2017

Team	From	To	Record				
Team	From	To	G	W	D	L	Win %
1. FC Köln	1961	1963	80	51	12	17	63.75
Bayern Munich	1 July 1963	30 June 1968	220	113	56	51	51.36
Hannover 96	1 July 1968	8 December 1969	63	21	18	24	33.33
Kickers Offenbach	January 1970	July 1970	81	34	20	27	41.98
Dinamo Zagreb	31 July 1970	26 October 1971	57	27	13	17	47.37
1. FC Köln	17 September 1973	12 December 1975	88	47	18	23	53.41
Kickers Offenbach	January 1976	October 1976	17	5	5	7	29.41
AEK Athens	11 October 1977	10 June 1978	73	38	23	12	52.05
FC Zürich	July 1978	March 1980	72	38	13	21	52.78
AEK Athens	27 January 1982	10 January 1983	35	19	8	8	54.29
Total			786	393	186	207	50.00

== Honours ==
=== Player ===
Partizan

- Yugoslav First League: 1946–47, 1948–49
- Yugoslav Cup: 1947, 1952, 1954

Yugoslavia

- Summer Olympics silver medal: 1948, 1952

=== Manager ===
Köln

- German Championship: 1962
- Oberliga: 1961–62, 1962–63

Bayern Munich

- DFB-Pokal: 1965–66, 1966–67
- European Cup Winners' Cup: 1966–67

Kickers Offenbach

- Regionalliga: 1969–70

AEK Athens

- Alpha Ethniki: 1977–78
- Greek Cup: 1977–78
