= Hans Schäfer =

German footballer (1927–2017)

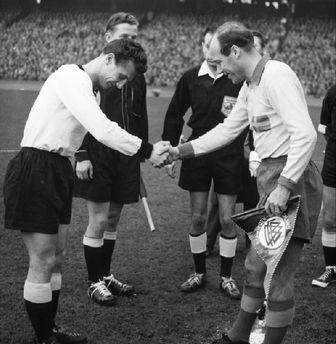
- Schäfer (left) in 1957

Personal information
- Date of birth: 19 October 1927
- Place of birth: Zollstock, Cologne, Germany
- Date of death: 7 November 2017 (aged 90)
- Place of death: Cologne, Germany
- Position: Outside left

Senior career*
Years	Team	Apps	(Gls)
1948–1965	1. FC Köln	394	(254)

International career
1952–1962	West Germany	39	(15)
Medal record
Representing West Germany
FIFA World Cup
Winner	1954 Switzerland
- * Club domestic league appearances and goals

Hans Schäfer (19 October 1927 – 7 November 2017) was a German footballer who played as an outside left.

== Career ==
Schäfer was born in Zollstock, Cologne. He played for 1. FC Köln between 1948 and 1965, and for the West Germany national team, earning 39 caps and scoring 15 goals. He played in three World Cups, in 1954, 1958, and 1962, earning a winner's medal in 1954 and scoring a total of seven goals from all of West Germany's total 15 matches played in the three editions. Between 1957 and 1962, Schäfer captained Germany 16 times.

Schäfer's position was that of an outside left. In the latter stages of his career, he became an inside left forward. He debuted for Germany on 9 November 1952, in the international friendly against Switzerland, scoring a goal. During the 1954 FIFA World Cup, Schäfer scored four goals.

Schäfer won the German football championship with 1. FC Köln in 1962 and 1964 and was voted German Footballer of the Year in 1963, at the age of 35. He played in the first two seasons of the newly founded Bundesliga 39 matches (20 goals) before retiring from professional football.

Schäfer died on 7 November 2017 at age 90.

== Career statistics ==
=== International ===
Appearances and goals by national team and year
National team	Year	Apps	Goals
Germany	1952	1	2
Germany	1953	3	0
Germany	1954	7	7
Germany	1955	5	1
Germany	1956	5	0
Germany	1957	3	0
Germany	1958	9	4
Germany	1959	1	0
Germany	1960	0	0
Germany	1961	0	0
Germany	1962	5	1
Total		39	15

== Honours ==
1. FC Köln

- Oberliga West: 1953–54, 1959–60, 1960–61, 1961–62, 1962–63
- German football championship: 1962
- Bundesliga: 1963–64

West Germany

- FIFA World Cup: 1954

Individual

- Footballer of the Year (Germany): 1963

== See also ==
- List of FIFA World Cup top goalscorers

World Cup-winners status
Preceded by Alcides Ghiggia	Oldest Living Player; 16 July 2015 – 7 November 2017	Succeeded by Mário Zagallo
