= Anton Regh =

German footballer (1940–2018)

Personal information
- Date of birth: 12 September 1940
- Date of death: 14 January 2018 (aged 77)
- Height: 1.73 m (5 ft 8 in)
- Position: Defender

Senior career*
Years	Team	Apps	(Gls)
1961–1969	1. FC Köln	136	(14)
1969–1971	Fortuna Köln		
1971–1972	Euskirchener TSC		
- * Club domestic league appearances and goals

Anton Regh (12 September 1940 – 14 January 2018) was a German former footballer who played as a defender for 1. FC Köln and Fortuna Köln. He died on 14 January 2018 at the age of 77.

== Honours ==
- German football championship: 1962
- Bundesliga: 1963–64
- DFB-Pokal: 1967–68
