= Pulheim Gophers =

Information
- League: Baseball-Bundesliga (Bundesliga Nord)
- Location: Pulheim
- Ballpark: Gophers' Ballpark
- Founded: 1989
- Colors: Green/Black/White
- Ownership: Pulheimer SC e.V.
- General manager: Marc Friese
- Website: www.pulheim-gophers.de

The Pulheim Gophers are a baseball and softball section of the sports club Pulheimer SC from Pulheim, North Rhine-Westphalia. The club was founded in 1989, and the first men's team was promoted to the first division of the Baseball Bundesliga in 2008, having previously played in the first division for the 2001, 2002 and 2004 seasons. After finishing in last place with a 6–18 record in 2009, the team improved to 11–17 in 2010, finishing fifth and only one game out of a playoff spot.

== Club structure ==
The full club consists of 6 teams:

- 1st Men's Baseball, Bundesliga's 1st Division
- 2nd Men's Baseball, Regionalliga North-West
- 3rd Men's Baseball, Bezirksliga Rhineland
- Juniors, National League
- Youth, National League
- Women, Union League

Membership in the club, as of 2011, costs €10 per month for youths under 18 and €15 per month for anyone over 18.

== Season-by-season performance (1st Bundesliga) ==
Year	Rank	Games	W	L	Win%	Season Notes
2009	7	24	6	18	.250	
2010	5	28	11	17	.393	
