= Willi Haag =

German footballer

Personal information
- Date of birth: 6 August 1944 (age 82)
- Place of birth: Sohren, Germany
- Position: Defender

Senior career*
Years	Team	Apps	(Gls)
1963–1967	SV Eintracht Trier 05		
1967–1970	Bayer 04 Leverkusen		
1970–1972	Preußen Münster		
1972–1975	Alemannia Aachen		

Managerial career
- 1977–1978: Alemannia Aachen (assistant)
- 1978: Alemannia Aachen
- 1978–1986: Alemannia Aachen (assistant)
- * Club domestic league appearances and goals

Willi Haag (born 6 August 1944) is a retired German football defender and later manager.
