= Karl-Heinz Ripkens =

German footballer (1937–2026)

Personal information
- Date of birth: 9 December 1937
- Place of birth: Cologne, Gau Cologne-Aachen, Germany
- Date of death: 8 May 2026 (aged 88)
- Place of death: Cologne, North Rhine-Westphalia, Germany
- Position: Forward

Senior career*
Years	Team	Apps	(Gls)
1959–1964	1. FC Köln	45	(9)
1964–1965	Standard Liège		
1965–1968	Bayer Leverkusen		
1968–1969	Viktoria Köln		
1969–1971	Fortuna Köln		
- * Club domestic league appearances and goals

Karl-Heinz Ripkens (9 December 1937 – 8 May 2026) was a German footballer who played as a forward. He started his career at 1. FC Köln, winning two championships with the club before moving to Belgian side Standard Liège in 1964. He returned to Germany after one season and went on to play for Bayer Leverkusen, Viktoria Köln and Fortuna Köln. Ripkens died in Cologne on 8 May 2026, at the age of 88.

== Honours ==
1. FC Köln

- German football championship: 1961–62
- Bundesliga: 1963–64
