= 1963–64 Bundesliga =

Inaugural season of the Bundesliga

Bundesliga
- Season: 1963–64
- Dates: 24 August 1963 – 9 May 1964
- Champions: 1. FC Köln; 1st Bundesliga title 2nd German title
- Relegated: Preußen Münster; 1. FC Saarbrücken
- European Cup: 1. FC Köln
- Cup Winners' Cup: 1860 Munich
- Matches: 240
- Goals: 857 (3.57 per match)
- Top goalscorer: Uwe Seeler (30)
- Biggest home win: 1860 Munich 9–2 Hamburg; E. Frankfurt 7–0 W. Bremen
- Biggest away win: Nürnberg 0–5 Kaiserslautern
- Highest scoring: B. Dortmund 9–3 Kaiserslautern

The 1963–64 Bundesliga season was the inaugural season for a single division highest tier of football in West Germany. It began on 24 August 1963 and ended on 9 May 1964. The first goal was scored by Friedhelm Konietzka for Borussia Dortmund in their game against Werder Bremen. The championship was won by 1. FC Köln. The first teams to be relegated were Preußen Münster and 1. FC Saarbrücken.

== Competition modus ==
Every team played two games against each other team, one at home and one away. Teams received two points for a win and one point for a draw. If two or more teams were tied on points, places were determined by goal average. The team with the most points were crowned champions while the two teams with the fewest points were relegated to their respective Regionalliga divisions.

== Teams ==
Sixteen teams were chosen from all Oberliga teams on both competitive and infrastructural aspects. The West and South divisions supplied five teams each, three clubs came from the North, while the Southwest provided two participants. The final member was chosen from the Oberliga Berlin.

The selection of teams for the inaugural Bundesliga season was controversial. Alemannia Aachen and Kickers Offenbach believed that they should have been chosen, due to their superior record over division rivals over the previous twelve seasons. They were not selected due to their relatively poorer performance in the seasons immediately preceding the start of the Bundesliga.

Location of teams in Bundesliga 1963–64

Club	Location	Oberliga	Ground	Capacity
Borussia Dortmund	Dortmund	Oberliga West	Stadion Rote Erde	30,000
Eintracht Braunschweig	Braunschweig	Oberliga North	Eintracht-Stadion	38,000
Eintracht Frankfurt	Frankfurt am Main	Oberliga South	Waldstadion	87,000
Hamburger SV	Hamburg	Oberliga North	Volksparkstadion	80,000
Hertha BSC	Berlin	Oberliga Berlin	Olympiastadion	100,000
1. FC Kaiserslautern	Kaiserslautern	Oberliga Southwest	Stadion Betzenberg	42,000
Karlsruher SC	Karlsruhe	Oberliga South	Wildparkstadion	50,000
1. FC Köln	Cologne	Oberliga West	Müngersdorfer Stadion	76,000
Meidericher SV	Duisburg	Oberliga West	Wedaustadion	38,500
1860 Munich	Munich	Oberliga South	Stadion an der Grünwalder Straße	51,794
1. FC Nürnberg	Nuremberg	Oberliga South	Städtisches Stadion	64,238
Preußen Münster	Münster	Oberliga West	Preußen-Stadion	45,000
1. FC Saarbrücken	Saarbrücken	Oberliga Southwest	Ludwigspark	40,000
FC Schalke 04	Gelsenkirchen	Oberliga West	Glückauf-Kampfbahn	35,000
VfB Stuttgart	Stuttgart	Oberliga South	Neckarstadion	53,000
Werder Bremen	Bremen	Oberliga North	Weserstadion	32,000

== League table ==
Pos	Team	Pld	W	D	L	GF	GA	GR	Pts	Qualification or relegation
1	1. FC Köln (C)	30	17	11	2	78	40	1.950	45	Qualification to European Cup preliminary round
2	Meidericher SV	30	13	13	4	60	36	1.667	39	
3	Eintracht Frankfurt	30	16	7	7	65	41	1.585	39	Qualification to Inter-Cities Fairs Cup first round
4	Borussia Dortmund	30	14	5	11	73	57	1.281	33	Qualification to Inter-Cities Fairs Cup first round
5	VfB Stuttgart	30	13	7	10	48	40	1.200	33	Qualification to Inter-Cities Fairs Cup first round
6	Hamburger SV	30	11	10	9	69	60	1.150	32	
7	1860 Munich	30	11	9	10	66	50	1.320	31	Qualification to Cup Winners' Cup first round
8	Schalke 04	30	12	5	13	51	53	0.962	29	
9	1. FC Nürnberg	30	11	7	12	45	56	0.804	29	
10	Werder Bremen	30	10	8	12	53	62	0.855	28	
11	Eintracht Braunschweig	30	11	6	13	36	49	0.735	28	
12	1. FC Kaiserslautern	30	10	6	14	48	69	0.696	26	
13	Karlsruher SC	30	8	8	14	42	55	0.764	24	
14	Hertha BSC	30	9	6	15	45	65	0.692	24	Qualification to Inter-Cities Fairs Cup first round
15	Preußen Münster (R)	30	7	9	14	34	52	0.654	23	Relegation to Regionalliga
16	1. FC Saarbrücken (R)	30	6	5	19	44	72	0.611	17	Relegation to Regionalliga

Source: www.dfb.de (in German)
Rules for classification: 1) points; 2) goal average.
(C) Champions; (R) Relegated

== Results ==
Home \ Away	BSC	EBS	SVW	BVB	SGE	HSV	FCK	KSC	KOE	MSV	M60	PRM	FCN	FCS	S04	VFB
Hertha BSC	—	1–2	5–2	0–0	1–3	1–2	2–2	2–3	0–3	5–2	3–1	2–0	1–1	3–2	1–0	0–2
Eintracht Braunschweig	1–1	—	1–1	2–0	0–3	2–1	0–1	2–0	1–1	0–0	0–1	1–0	2–0	3–1	4–3	2–0
Werder Bremen	2–2	2–3	—	3–2	4–1	4–2	2–0	0–0	1–1	1–1	4–1	4–2	2–1	0–3	1–0	2–2
Borussia Dortmund	7–2	3–0	4–3	—	3–0	5–2	9–3	3–2	2–3	0–0	3–3	0–0	3–1	2–1	3–0	7–1
Eintracht Frankfurt	4–0	3–0	7–0	2–1	—	2–2	1–1	0–3	2–1	2–2	5–2	3–0	2–3	3–1	4–2	3–2
Hamburger SV	5–1	2–1	1–1	2–1 (Note: The Hamburger SV v Borussia Dortmund match from 7 December 1963 was suspended after 61 minutes and a score of 1–2 due to poor visibility caused by heavy fog. The replay took place on 21 December 1963 and finished with a score of 2–1.)	3–0	—	7–3	1–1	1–1	3–3	5–0	5–0	2–2	4–2	3–1	1–1
1. FC Kaiserslautern	3–0	2–1	3–0	0–1	1–1	3–2	—	1–0	3–3	1–1	2–1	0–0	3–1	2–4	2–3	1–3
Karlsruher SC	1–1	3–1	1–1	1–3	1–2	0–4	5–1	—	2–2	1–4	1–0	4–2	1–3	2–2	1–1	0–3
1. FC Köln	3–1	4–1	4–3	5–2	1–1	4–1	5–1	4–0	—	3–3	2–2	3–0	5–0	1–3	2–2	2–1
Meidericher SV	1–3	5–1	1–0	3–3	3–1	4–0	3–0	2–0	2–2	—	3–0	0–0	0–0	3–1	3–0	3–0
1860 Munich	1–2	1–1	3–2	6–1	1–1	9–2	3–0	1–0	1–3	0–0	—	3–1	5–0	7–1	7–1	1–1
Preußen Münster	4–2	0–2	1–3	1–2	1–3	1–1	1–0	0–0	0–2	4–2	0–0	—	0–1	2–1	2–2	4–2
1. FC Nürnberg	2–3	1–0	3–0	4–0	1–0	3–2	0–5	2–4	2–2	2–0	2–2	2–2	—	2–0	0–2	0–0
1. FC Saarbrücken	3–0	2–2	3–2	2–1	0–4	1–1	2–4	1–3	0–2	0–2	1–2	1–1	3–5	—	1–1	0–1
Schalke 04	1–0	2–0	2–3	3–1	1–2	1–0	4–0	2–1	2–3	2–2	2–1	1–2	4–1	4–1	—	2–0
VfB Stuttgart	2–0	5–0	2–0	2–1	0–0	2–2	4–0	4–1	0–1	1–2	1–1	0–3	1–0	3–1	2–0	—

Source: DFB
Legend: Blue = home team win; Yellow = draw; Red = away team win.

== Top goalscorers ==
30 goals

- (Germany) Uwe Seeler (Hamburger SV)

20 goals

- (Germany) Friedhelm Konietzka (Borussia Dortmund)

19 goals

- (Germany) Rudolf Brunnenmeier (1860 Munich)

18 goals

- (Austria) Wilhelm Huberts (Eintracht Frankfurt)
- (Germany) Klaus Matischak (FC Schalke 04)

16 goals

- (Germany) Lothar Emmerich (Borussia Dortmund)
- (Germany) Heinz Strehl (1. FC Nürnberg)
- (Germany) Karl-Heinz Thielen (1. FC Köln)

15 goals

- (Germany) Christian Müller (1. FC Köln)
- (Germany) Dieter Höller (VfB Stuttgart)
- (Germany) Gert Dörfel (Hamburger SV)

== Champion squad ==
1. FC Köln
Goalkeepers: Fritz Ewert (26); Anton Schumacher (4).

Defenders: Leo Wilden (29 / 1); Anton Regh (29); Fritz Pott (27 / 1); Wolfgang Weber (27 / 1); Matthias Hemmersbach (17).
Midfielders: Hans Sturm (30 / 13); Wolfgang Overath (30 / 9); Helmut Benthaus (27 / 1); Hans Schäfer (22 / 12); Wolfgang Weber (17 / 3).
Forwards: Karl-Heinz Thielen (25 / 16); Christian Müller (22 / 15); Heinz Hornig (24 / 7); Karl-Heinz Ripkens (1).
(league appearances and goals listed in brackets)

Manager: Georg Knöpfle.

On the roster but have not played in a league game: Fritz Breuer; Jürgen Rumor; Georg Stollenwerk.

== Attendances ==
VfB Stuttgart drew the highest average home attendance in the 1963-64 edition of the Bundesliga.

#	Football club	Home games	Average attendance
1	VfB Stuttgart	15	40,133
2	Hertha BSC	15	35,487
3	Hamburger SV	15	34,600
4	1860 Munich	15	32,267
5	1. FC Köln	15	31,904
6	Karlsruher SC	15	31,667
7	1. FC Nürnberg	15	28,600
8	Meidericher SV	15	28,400
9	Eintracht Frankfurt	15	26,300
10	FC Schalke 04	15	23,933
11	Borussia Dortmund	15	23,133
12	Preußen Münster	15	22,267
13	1. FC Kaiserslautern	15	22,133
14	Eintracht Braunschweig	15	21,467
15	Werder Bremen	15	20,733
16	1. FC Saarbrücken	15	18,067
