= Heinz Hornig =

German footballer

Personal information
- Date of birth: 28 September 1937 (age 89)
- Place of birth: Gelsenkirchen, Germany
- Height: 1.68 m (5 ft 6 in)
- Position: Striker

Youth career
- Eintracht Gelsenkirchen

Senior career*
Years	Team	Apps	(Gls)
1958–1959	Schalke 04		
1959–1962	Rot-Weiss Essen		
1962–1970	1. FC Köln	197	(37)
1970–1973	R. Daring Club Molenbeek		

International career
1965–1966	West Germany	7	(0)

Managerial career
- 1971–1973: R. Daring Club Molenbeek
Medal record
Men's football
Representing West Germany
FIFA World Cup
Runner-up	1966 England
- * Club domestic league appearances and goals

Heinz Hornig (born 28 September 1937) is a German former footballer who played as a striker.

Hornig was capped by West Germany on seven occasions, making his debut in 1965 and his final appearances the following year. He was a member of the German squad at the 1966 FIFA World Cup, although he did not play a game in the tournament.

Hornig played his club football for 1. FC Köln between 1962 and 1970, and he appeared for them in the 1962–63 European Cup against Dundee.
