= Pulheimer SC =

German sports club

Pulheimer Sportclub 1924/57 e. V.
- Abbreviation: PSC
- Formation: September 9, 1966; 59 years ago
- Headquarters: Zur Offenen Tür 11; 50259 Pulheim, Germany
- Website: www.sc-pulheim.de

Pulheimer SC is a German sports club from Pulheim. It has sections for association football, handball, baseball (Pulheim Gophers), hockey, basketball, inline hockey, volleyball, badminton, tennis, table tennis, budo, fencing, track and field, cycling, swimming, dancing, and chess.

In June 1924, SC Sparta Pulheim was founded as a football club. Numerous other sports were added over the years. On 9 September 1966 it merged with VfL Pulheim (founded 1957), creating the modern club.

Successful club members in individual sports include Gerald Ciolek (road cycling) and Helga Arendt (400 metres).
