= 1961–62 Oberliga =

Oberliga
- Season: 1961–62
- Champions: Hamburger SV Tasmania 1900 Berlin: 1. FC Köln; Borussia Neunkirchen: 1. FC Nürnberg
- Relegated: Bremer SV Eintracht Nordhorn Union 06 Berlin SV Sodingen Duisburger SV Eintracht Trier Phönix Ludwigshafen FSV Frankfurt Waldhof Mannheim
- German champions: 1. FC Köln; 1st German title
- Top goalscorer: Rudi Dörrenbächer (37 goals)

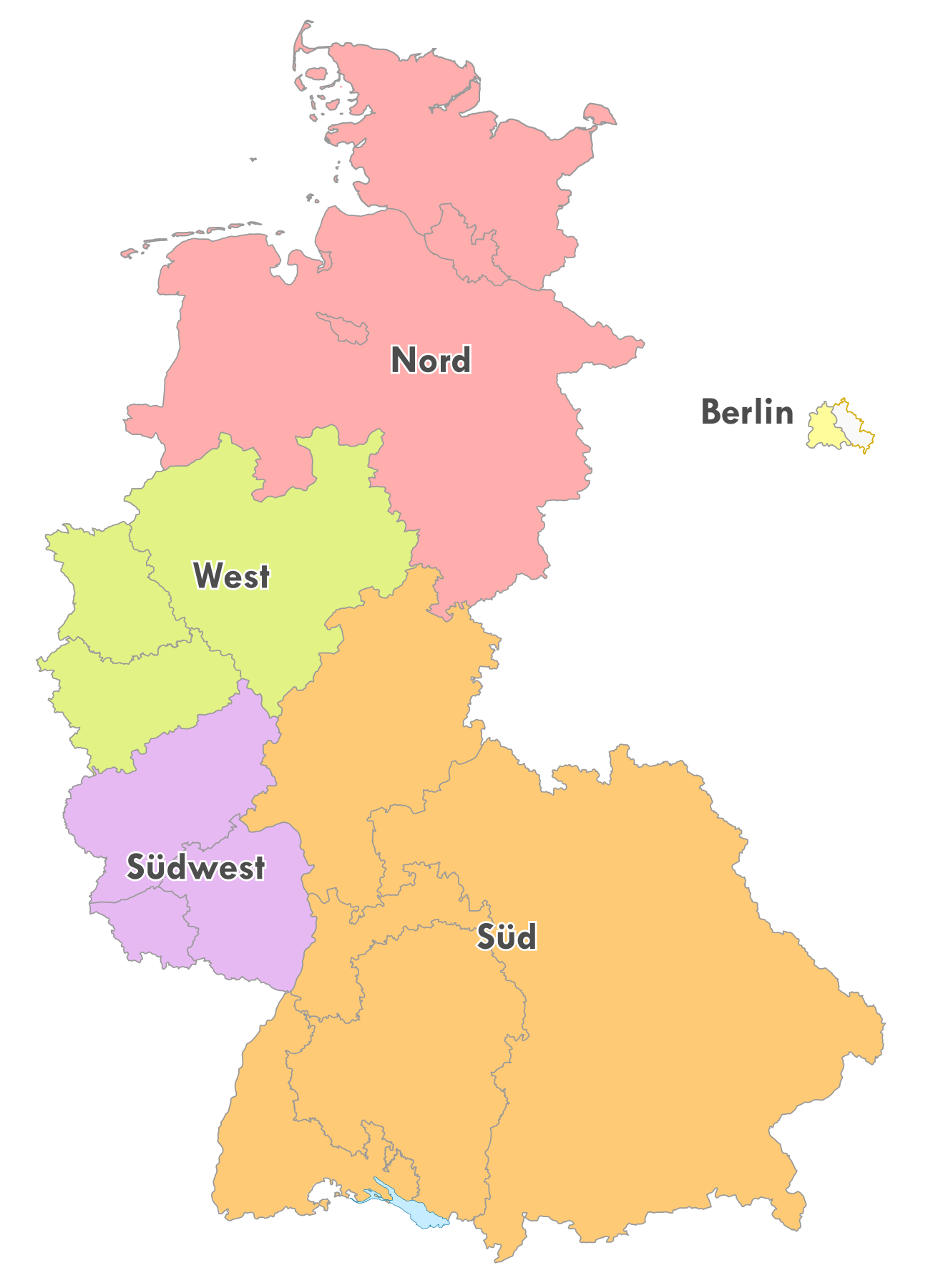
Map of the five German Oberligas 1945 to 1963

The 1961–62 Oberliga was the seventeenth season of the Oberliga, the first tier of the football league system in West Germany. The league operated in five regional divisions, Berlin, North, South, Southwest and West. The five league champions and the runners-up from the west, south, southwest and north then entered the 1962 German football championship which was won by 1. FC Köln. It was 1. FC Köln's first-ever national championship.

Hamburger SV equaled the Oberliga start record set in 1952–53 by 1. FC Köln and repeated by Hannover 96 the season after, winning its first eleven games, a mark never surpassed.

A similar league, the DDR-Oberliga, existed in East Germany, set at the first tier of the East German football league system. The 1961–62 DDR-Oberliga was won by ASK Vorwärts Berlin.

== Oberliga Nord ==
The 1961–62 season saw two new clubs in the league, Bremer SV and Eintracht Nordhorn, both promoted from the Amateurliga. The league's top scorers were Uwe Seeler (Hamburger SV) and Gerd Koll (Holstein Kiel) with 28 goals each.

Pos	Team	Pld	W	D	L	GF	GA	GD	Pts	Promotion, qualification or relegation
1	Hamburger SV	30	24	2	4	100	34	+66	50	Qualification to German championship
2	Werder Bremen	30	18	8	4	87	33	+54	44	Qualification to German championship
3	VfV Hildesheim	30	20	2	8	77	40	+37	42	
4	FC St. Pauli	30	17	6	7	72	51	+21	40	
5	Holstein Kiel	30	17	3	10	84	52	+32	37	
6	Eintracht Braunschweig	30	13	10	7	67	55	+12	36	
7	VfL Osnabrück	30	12	6	12	40	52	−12	30	
8	VfR Neumünster	30	12	3	15	48	56	−8	27	
9	ASV Bergedorf 85	30	10	7	13	45	55	−10	27	
10	VfB Oldenburg	30	11	3	16	42	59	−17	25	
11	FC Altona 93	30	10	4	16	47	79	−32	24	
12	Concordia Hamburg	30	8	7	15	47	50	−3	23	
13	Hannover 96	30	6	11	13	47	60	−13	23	
14	TuS Bremerhaven 93	30	8	7	15	35	65	−30	23	
15	Bremer SV (R)	30	6	6	18	40	84	−44	18	Relegation to Amateurliga
16	Eintracht Nordhorn (R)	30	4	3	23	42	95	−53	11	Relegation to Amateurliga

Source: RSSSF.com
Rules for classification: 1) Points;
(R) Relegated

== Oberliga Berlin ==
The 1961–62 season saw one new club in the league, Union 06 Berlin, promoted from the Amateurliga Berlin. The league's top scorers were Wolfgang Seeger (Tennis Borussia Berlin) and Lutz Steinert (Hertha BSC) with 18 goals each.

Pos	Team	Pld	W	D	L	GF	GA	GD	Pts	Promotion, qualification or relegation
1	Tasmania 1900 Berlin	27	19	6	2	72	19	+53	44	Qualification to German championship
2	Hertha BSC Berlin	27	19	5	3	73	32	+41	43	
3	Tennis Borussia Berlin	27	12	8	7	54	35	+19	32	
4	Spandauer SV	27	11	4	12	50	56	−6	26	
5	Berliner SV 92	27	10	5	12	43	47	−4	25	
6	BFC Südring	27	10	5	12	36	48	−12	25	
7	Hertha Zehlendorf	27	8	6	13	45	51	−6	22	
8	Wacker 04 Berlin	27	7	8	12	38	57	−19	22	
9	Viktoria 89 Berlin	27	8	5	14	43	59	−16	21	
10	Union 06 Berlin (R)	27	3	4	20	24	74	−50	10	Relegation to Amateurliga Berlin

Source: RSSSF.com
Rules for classification: 1) Points;
(R) Relegated

== Oberliga West ==
The 1961–62 season saw two new clubs in the league, Fortuna Düsseldorf and Schwarz-Weiß Essen, both promoted from the 2. Oberliga West. The league's top scorer was Manfred Rummel of Schwarz-Weiß Essen with 26 goals.

Pos	Team	Pld	W	D	L	GF	GA	GD	Pts	Promotion, qualification or relegation
1	1. FC Köln (C)	30	20	4	6	89	40	+49	44	Qualification to German championship
2	FC Schalke 04	30	18	7	5	68	40	+28	43	Qualification to German championship
3	Rot-Weiß Oberhausen	30	16	8	6	53	37	+16	40	
4	Schwarz-Weiß Essen	30	13	12	5	64	39	+25	38	
5	Meidericher SV	30	13	9	8	50	37	+13	35	
6	Westfalia Herne	30	14	6	10	58	45	+13	34	
7	Preußen Münster	30	11	12	7	60	47	+13	34	
8	Borussia Dortmund	30	12	8	10	67	51	+16	32	
9	Fortuna Düsseldorf	30	13	6	11	57	50	+7	32	
10	Viktoria Köln	30	13	3	14	62	72	−10	29	
11	Alemannia Aachen	30	8	11	11	50	56	−6	27	
12	Sportfreunde Hamborn	30	8	6	16	38	68	−30	22	
13	Borussia Mönchengladbach	30	9	3	18	42	57	−15	21	
14	TSV Marl-Hüls	30	7	7	16	52	82	−30	21	
15	SV Sodingen (R)	30	5	8	17	31	57	−26	18	Relegation to 2. Oberliga West
16	Duisburger SV (R)	30	3	4	23	28	91	−63	10	Relegation to 2. Oberliga West

Source: RSSSF.com
Rules for classification: 1) Points;
(C) Champions; (R) Relegated

== Oberliga Südwest ==
The 1961–62 season saw two new clubs in the league, BSC Oppau and VfR Kaiserslautern, both promoted from the 2. Oberliga Südwest. The league's top scorer was Rudi Dörrenbächer of Borussia Neunkirchen with 37 goals, the highest total for any scorer in the five Oberligas in 1961–62.

Pos	Team	Pld	W	D	L	GF	GA	GD	Pts	Promotion, qualification or relegation
1	Borussia Neunkirchen	30	21	6	3	102	29	+73	48	Qualification to German championship
2	FK Pirmasens	30	20	5	5	104	33	+71	45	Qualification to German championship
3	1. FC Saarbrücken	30	18	6	6	69	44	+25	42	
4	1. FC Kaiserslautern	30	16	8	6	66	37	+29	40	
5	Wormatia Worms	30	14	9	7	66	40	+26	37	
6	TuRa Ludwigshafen	30	11	12	7	62	54	+8	34	
7	SC Ludwigshafen	30	10	8	12	38	48	−10	28	
8	Sportfreunde Saarbrücken	30	11	4	15	52	75	−23	26	
9	Saar 05 Saarbrücken	30	10	5	15	42	56	−14	25	
10	FSV Mainz 05	30	10	5	15	47	69	−22	25	
11	BSC Oppau	30	8	9	13	42	70	−28	25	
12	TuS Neuendorf	30	9	6	15	53	60	−7	24	
13	Eintracht Kreuznach	30	7	10	13	33	59	−26	24	
14	VfR Kaiserslautern	30	10	3	17	35	63	−28	23	
15	Eintracht Trier (R)	30	7	5	18	28	78	−50	19	Relegation to 2. Oberliga Südwest
16	Phönix Ludwigshafen (R)	30	4	7	19	28	62	−34	15	Relegation to 2. Oberliga Südwest

Source: RSSSF.com
Rules for classification: 1) Points;
(R) Relegated

== Oberliga Süd ==
The 1961–62 season saw two new clubs in the league, BC Augsburg and Schwaben Augsburg, both promoted from the 2. Oberliga Süd. The league's top scorer was Lothar Schämer of Eintracht Frankfurt with 26 goals.

Pos	Team	Pld	W	D	L	GF	GA	GD	Pts	Promotion, qualification or relegation
1	1. FC Nürnberg	30	20	3	7	70	30	+40	43	Qualification to German championship
2	Eintracht Frankfurt	30	19	5	6	81	37	+44	43	Qualification to German championship
3	FC Bayern Munich	30	17	6	7	67	55	+12	40	
4	Kickers Offenbach	30	16	5	9	65	50	+15	37	
5	VfB Stuttgart	30	13	8	9	66	53	+13	34	
6	FC Bayern Hof	30	12	8	10	55	56	−1	32	
7	TSV 1860 München	30	11	8	11	64	57	+7	30	
8	SSV Reutlingen	30	12	5	13	57	51	+6	29	
9	Karlsruher SC	30	8	12	10	47	44	+3	28	
10	VfR Mannheim	30	9	10	11	47	59	−12	28	
11	BC Augsburg	30	9	8	13	55	63	−8	26	
12	SpVgg Fürth	30	6	12	12	31	39	−8	24	
13	Schwaben Augsburg	30	10	3	17	43	78	−35	23	
14	FC Schweinfurt 05	30	9	4	17	39	63	−24	22	
15	FSV Frankfurt (R)	30	7	7	16	35	65	−30	21	Relegation to 2. Oberliga Süd
16	SV Waldhof Mannheim (R)	30	6	8	16	39	61	−22	20	Relegation to 2. Oberliga Süd

Source: RSSSF.com
Rules for classification: 1) Points;
(R) Relegated

== German championship ==
The 1962 German football championship was contested by the nine qualified Oberliga teams and won by 1. FC Köln, defeating 1. FC Nürnberg in the final. The runners-up of the Oberliga Nord and West played a pre-qualifying match. The remaining eight clubs then played a home-or-away round in two groups of four. The two group winners then advanced to the final.

=== Qualifying ===
Team 1	Score	Team 2
FC Schalke 04	4–1 aet	SV Werder Bremen

=== Group 1 ===
Pos	Team	Pld	W	D	L	GF	GA	GD	Pts	Promotion, qualification or relegation	FCN	TAS	S04	BOR
1	1. FC Nürnberg (Q)	3	3	0	0	8	4	+4	6	Qualified to final	—	—	3–1	3–2
2	Tasmania 1900 Berlin	3	1	1	1	3	3	0	3		1–2	—	1–1	—
3	FC Schalke 04	3	1	1	1	5	6	−1	3		—	—	—	3–2
4	Borussia Neunkirchen	3	0	0	3	4	7	−3	0		—	0–1	—	—

Source: RSSSF.com
Rules for classification: 1) Points;
(Q) Qualified for the phase indicated

=== Group 2 ===
Pos	Team	Pld	W	D	L	GF	GA	GD	Pts	Promotion, qualification or relegation	FCK	EF	HSV	PIR
1	1. FC Köln (Q)	3	3	0	0	14	1	+13	6	Qualified to final	—	—	1–0	10–0
2	Eintracht Frankfurt	3	2	0	1	11	5	+6	4		1–3	—	—	8–1
3	Hamburger SV	3	1	0	2	7	6	+1	2		—	1–2	—	—
4	FK Pirmasens	3	0	0	3	4	24	−20	0		—	—	3–6	—

Source: RSSSF.com
Rules for classification: 1) Points;
(Q) Qualified for the phase indicated

=== Final ===
Team 1	Score	Team 2
1. FC Köln	4–0	1. FC Nürnberg
