= Christian Müller (footballer, born 1938) =

German footballer

Personal information
- Date of birth: 29 August 1938 (age 88)
- Place of birth: Bergheim, German Reich
- Height: 1.84 m (6 ft 0 in)
- Position: Forward

Youth career
- –1958: SC Fliesteden

Senior career*
Years	Team	Apps	(Gls)
1958–1966	1. FC Köln	181	(128)
1966–1970	Karlsruher SC	61	(41)
1970–1971	SC Viktoria 04 Köln	2	(0)
Total		244	(169)

Managerial career
- SpVgg Oberaußem
- Pulheimer SC
- * Club domestic league appearances and goals

Christian Müller (born 29 August 1938) is a German former professional footballer. A forward, he made 131 appearances and scored 71 goals in the Bundesliga for 1. FC Köln and Karlsruher SC during his playing career.
