= Karl-Heinz Thielen =

German footballer

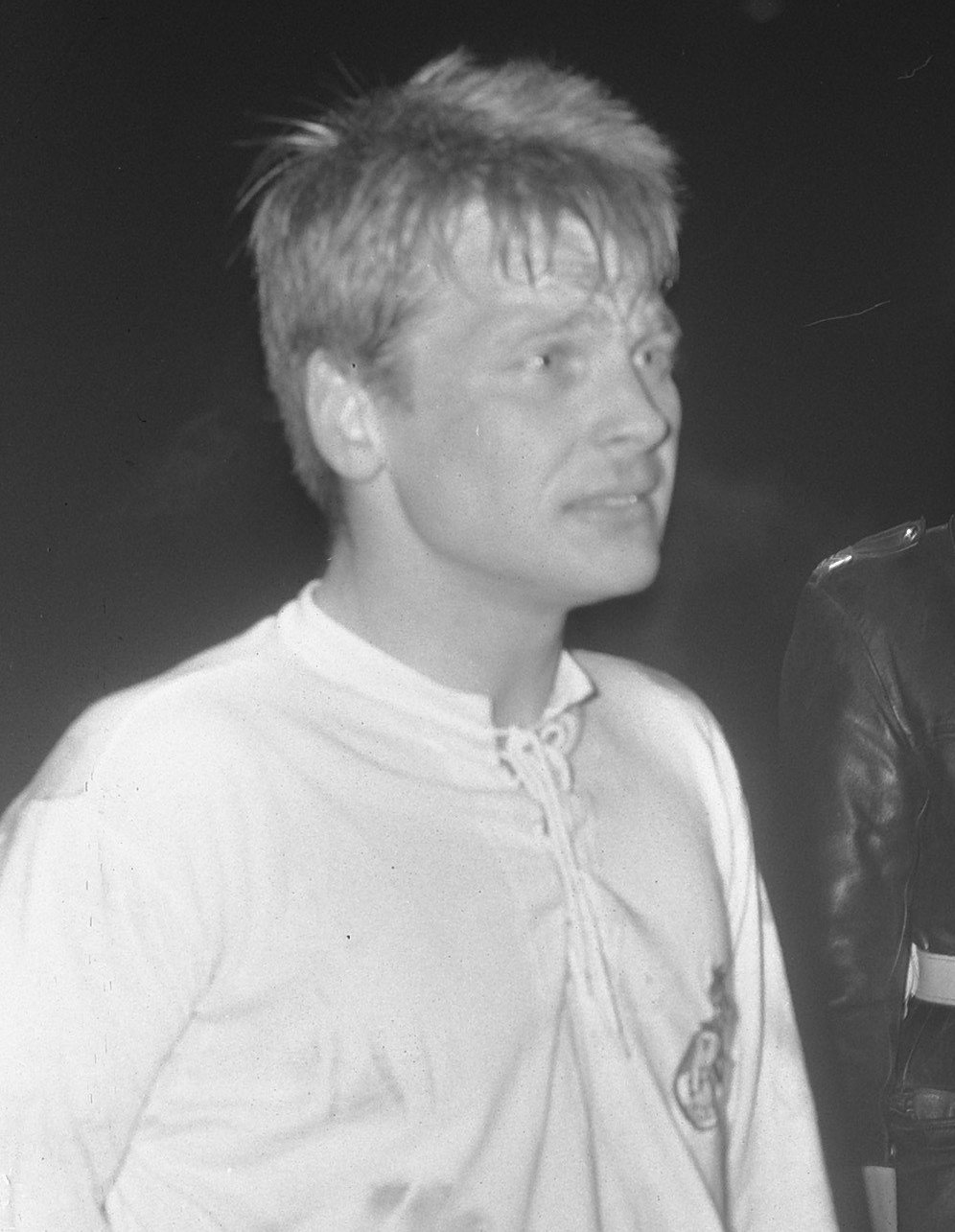
- Thielen in 1965

Personal information
- Date of birth: 2 April 1940 (age 86)
- Place of birth: Germany
- Height: 1.88 m (6 ft 2 in)
- Positions: Striker; defender

Senior career*
Years	Team	Apps	(Gls)
–1959	TSV Rodenkirchen		
1959–1973	1. FC Köln	295	(100)

International career
1964–1965	Germany	2	(0)
- * Club domestic league appearances and goals

Karl-Heinz Thielen (born 2 April 1940) is a German former footballer who played as a striker or defender.

== Club career ==
Thielen spent ten seasons in the Bundesliga with 1. FC Köln. He played as right winger for 1. FC Köln, which was a founding member of the 1. Bundesliga in 1963. In his first year, he became German champion with the club, making 25 appearances and scoring 15 goals. In total, Thielen, who had also played for Köln in the Oberliga West from the 1959–60 season, made 221 Bundesliga appearances and scored 56 goals between 1963 and 1973. On 7 December 1963, he became the first of now 14 players to score five goals in a Bundesliga match in 1. FC Köln's 5–1 win against 1. FC Kaiserslautern.

He scored a goal in two games for the DFB's U-23 team in the early 1960s. He later also played twice for the senior national team: in the home games against the ČSSR (1964) and against England (1965), the West German team came off as losers in both cases.

== International career ==
Thielen also represented West Germany in two friendlies.

== Official career ==
After finishing his active career, he became a soccer manager and played a role in the appointment of coach Hennes Weisweiler, with whom 1. FC Köln won the German Cup in 1976–77. In 1977–78, he won the double of Bundesliga and DFB-Pokal with 1. FC Köln. He later served as treasurer, managing director and vice president. From 1989 to 1991, he was sports director at Fortuna Düsseldorf. At the end of 1992, he returned to the then relegation-threatened 1. FC Köln as manager until September 1993. In the same year, Köln became German indoor champions.

Thielen was elected president of the "Deutsche Fußballspieler-Vermittler Vereinigung" (DFVV) at its founding meeting. He held this office until his retirement due to age on 2 April 2015.

As of February 2010, Thielen was a player agent and represents, among others, Liam Lawrence, Juan Carlos Menseguez and Facundo Hernán Quiroga.

== Statistic ==
- 1. Bundesliga
  - 221 appearances; 56 goals
- Oberliga West
  - 74 appearances; 44 goals
- Final round of the German championship
  - 18 appearances; 15 goals
- DFB-Pokal
  - 25 appearances; 6 goals
- Westpokal
  - 12 appearances; 8 goals
- UEFA Champions League; UEFA Cup Winners' Cup; UEFA Europa League
  - 45 appearances; 15 goals

== Honours ==
- West German: 1962, 1964
- DFB-Pokal: 1968; runner-up: 1970, 1971 and 1973
