= 1962–63 Oberliga =

Oberliga
- Season: 1962–63
- Champions: Hamburger SV Hertha BSC Berlin: 1. FC Köln; 1. FC Kaiserslautern; TSV 1860 München
- Relegated: 58 clubs
- German champions: Borussia Dortmund; 3rd German title
- Top goalscorer: Hans-Joachim Altendorff (41 goals)

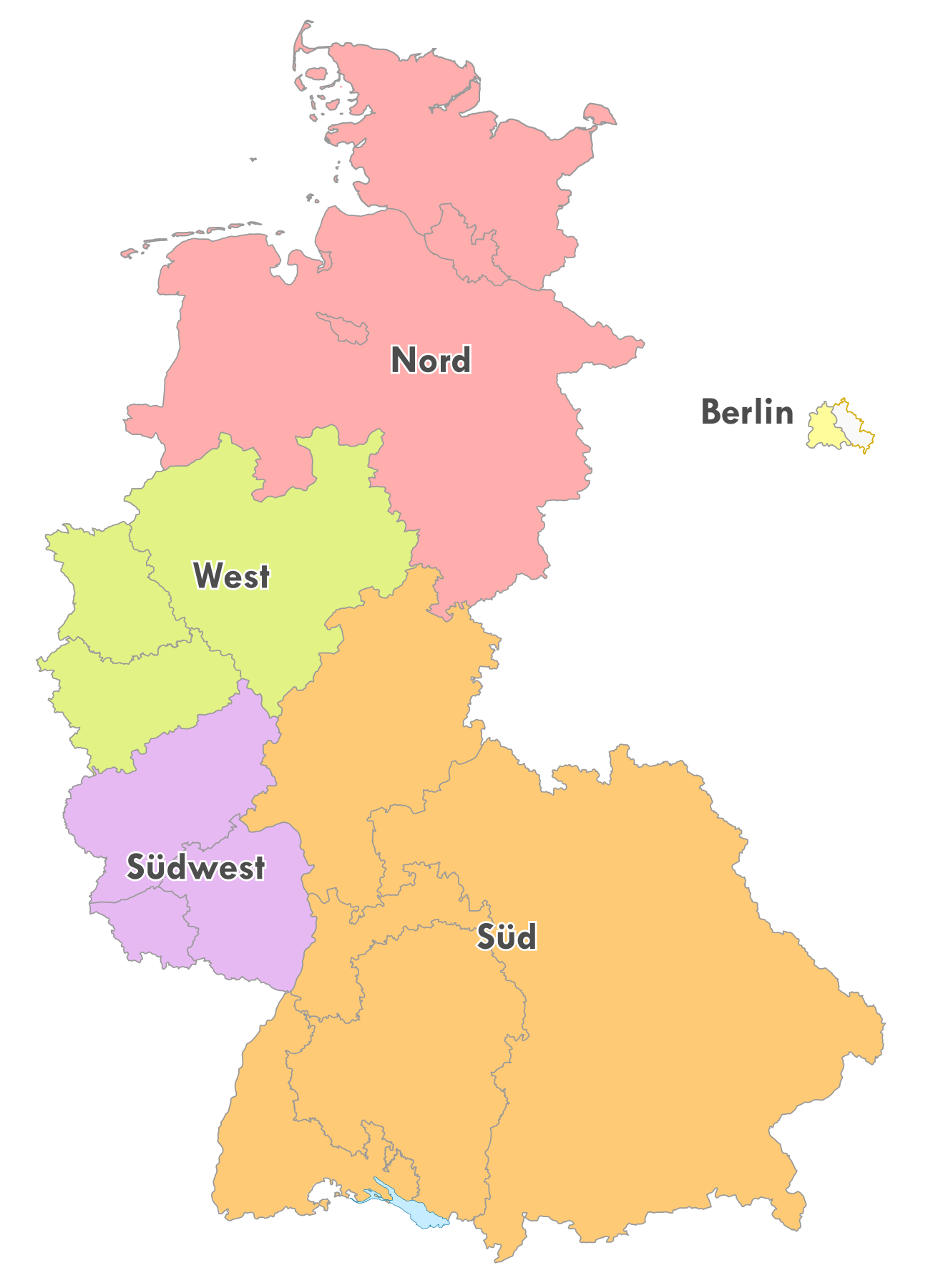
Map of the five German Oberligas 1945 to 1963

The 1962–63 Oberliga was the eighteenth Oberliga season, the first tier of the football league system in West Germany. The league operated in five regional divisions, Berlin, North, South, Southwest and West. The five league champions and the runners-up from the west, south, southwest and north then entered the 1963 German football championship which was won by Borussia Dortmund. It was Borussia Dortmund's third national championship, having previously won it in 1956 and 1957.

It was the last season of the Oberliga as a tier one league as, following the 1962–63 season, the Bundesliga was introduced which the best Oberliga teams qualified for. Qualification for the new Bundesliga was determined by taking the previous ten seasons into account.

A similar league, the DDR-Oberliga, existed in East Germany, set at the first tier of the East German football league system. The 1962–63 DDR-Oberliga was won by SC Motor Jena.

== Oberliga Nord ==
The 1962–63 season saw two new clubs in the league, VfB Lübeck and Arminia Hannover, both promoted from the Amateurliga. The league's top scorer was Dieter Meyer of Werder Bremen with 37 goals.

Pos	Team	Pld	W	D	L	GF	GA	GD	Pts	Qualification or relegation
1	Hamburger SV	30	22	5	3	100	40	+60	49	Qualification for German championship & Bundesliga
2	Werder Bremen	30	22	3	5	102	44	+58	47	Qualification for German championship & Bundesliga
3	Eintracht Braunschweig	30	17	3	10	62	41	+21	37	Qualification to Bundesliga
4	VfR Neumünster (R)	30	14	7	9	48	46	+2	35	Relegation to Regionalliga Nord
5	Holstein Kiel (R)	30	14	6	10	73	58	+15	34	Relegation to Regionalliga Nord
6	FC St.Pauli (R)	30	11	8	11	48	45	+3	30	Relegation to Regionalliga Nord
7	VfL Osnabrück (R)	30	12	4	14	44	46	−2	28	Relegation to Regionalliga Nord
8	VfV Hildesheim (R)	30	11	5	14	51	62	−11	27	Relegation to Regionalliga Nord
9	Hannover 96 (R)	30	12	3	15	47	61	−14	27	Relegation to Regionalliga Nord
10	Arminia Hannover (R)	30	11	4	15	56	64	−8	26	Relegation to Regionalliga Nord
11	ASV Bergedorf 85 (R)	30	9	8	13	44	57	−13	26	Relegation to Regionalliga Nord
12	VfB Oldenburg (R)	30	7	11	12	46	67	−21	25	Relegation to Regionalliga Nord
13	TuS Bremerhaven 93 (R)	30	9	6	15	40	56	−16	24	Relegation to Regionalliga Nord
14	Concordia Hamburg (R)	30	9	5	16	43	64	−21	23	Relegation to Regionalliga Nord
15	FC Altona 93 (R)	30	10	2	18	51	76	−25	22	Relegation to Regionalliga Nord
16	VfB Lübeck (R)	30	7	6	17	37	65	−28	20	Relegation to Regionalliga Nord

Source: RSSSF.com
Rules for classification: 1) Points;
(R) Relegated

== Oberliga Berlin ==
The 1962–63 season saw one new club in the league, SC Tegel, promoted from the Amateurliga Berlin. The league's top scorer was Hans-Joachim Altendorff of Hertha BSC with 41 goals, the highest total for any scorer in the five Oberligas in 1962–63.

Pos	Team	Pld	W	D	L	GF	GA	GD	Pts	Qualification or relegation
1	Hertha BSC Berlin	27	22	1	4	95	34	+61	45	Qualification for German championship & Bundesliga
2	Tasmania 1900 Berlin (R)	27	17	5	5	73	28	+45	39	Relegation to Regionalliga Berlin
3	Tennis Borussia Berlin (R)	27	14	6	7	66	36	+30	34	Relegation to Regionalliga Berlin
4	Spandauer SV (R)	27	11	11	5	52	37	+15	33	Relegation to Regionalliga Berlin
5	Hertha Zehlendorf (R)	27	10	5	12	44	54	−10	25	Relegation to Regionalliga Berlin
6	Wacker 04 Berlin (R)	27	9	3	15	43	59	−16	21	Relegation to Regionalliga Berlin
7	BFC Südring (R)	27	7	6	14	43	65	−22	20	Relegation to Regionalliga Berlin
8	Berliner SV 92 (R)	27	7	6	14	35	66	−31	20	Relegation to Regionalliga Berlin
9	Viktoria 89 Berlin (R)	27	6	6	15	39	65	−26	18	Relegation to Amateurliga Berlin
10	SC Tegel (R)	27	5	5	17	39	85	−46	15	Relegation to Amateurliga Berlin

Source: RSSSF.com
Rules for classification: 1) Points;
(R) Relegated

== Oberliga West ==
The 1962–63 season saw two new clubs in the league, Bayer 04 Leverkusen and Wuppertaler SV, both promoted from the 2. Oberliga West. The league's top scorer was Jürgen Schütz of Borussia Dortmund with 25 goals.

Pos	Team	Pld	W	D	L	GF	GA	GD	Pts	Qualification or relegation
1	1. FC Köln	30	18	6	6	65	37	+28	42	Qualification for German championship & Bundesliga
2	Borussia Dortmund (C)	30	19	2	9	77	39	+38	40	Qualification for German championship & Bundesliga
3	Meidericher SV	30	15	8	7	47	43	+4	38	Qualification to Bundesliga
4	Preußen Münster	30	14	9	7	51	32	+19	37	Qualification to Bundesliga
5	Alemannia Aachen (R)	30	14	9	7	58	42	+16	37	Relegation to Regionalliga West
6	FC Schalke 04	30	13	9	8	62	43	+19	35	Qualification to Bundesliga
7	Schwarz-Weiß Essen (R)	30	13	7	10	44	37	+7	33	Relegation to Regionalliga West
8	Viktoria Köln (R)	30	12	6	12	81	69	+12	30	Relegation to Regionalliga West
9	Bayer Leverkusen (R)	30	10	10	10	50	54	−4	30	Relegation to Regionalliga West
10	Rot-Weiß Oberhausen (R)	30	10	9	11	49	58	−9	29	Relegation to Regionalliga West
11	Borussia Mönchengladbach (R)	30	8	8	14	44	60	−16	24	Relegation to Regionalliga West
12	Sportfreunde Hamborn (R)	30	9	6	15	34	50	−16	24	Relegation to Regionalliga West
13	Fortuna Düsseldorf (R)	30	8	6	16	43	64	−21	22	Relegation to Regionalliga West
14	Westfalia Herne (R)	30	8	5	17	43	65	−22	21	Relegation to Regionalliga West
15	Wuppertaler SV (R)	30	9	2	19	43	66	−23	20	Relegation to Regionalliga West
16	TSV Marl-Hüls (R)	30	7	4	19	37	69	−32	18	Relegation to Regionalliga West

Source: RSSSF.com
Rules for classification: 1) Points;
(C) Champions; (R) Relegated

== Oberliga Südwest ==
The 1962–63 season saw two new clubs in the league, SV Niederlahnstein and VfR Frankenthal, both promoted from the 2. Oberliga Südwest. The league's top scorer was Dieter Krafczyk of 1. FC Saarbrücken with 29 goals.

Pos	Team	Pld	W	D	L	GF	GA	GD	Pts	Qualification or relegation
1	1. FC Kaiserslautern	30	23	1	6	110	34	+76	47	Qualification for German championship & Bundesliga
2	Borussia Neunkirchen (R)	30	17	7	6	64	30	+34	41	Qualification for German championship & Relegation to Regionalliga Südwest
3	FK Pirmasens (R)	30	17	7	6	82	39	+43	41	Relegation to Regionalliga Südwest
4	Wormatia Worms (R)	30	17	7	6	70	36	+34	41	Relegation to Regionalliga Südwest
5	1. FC Saarbrücken	30	17	6	7	80	41	+39	40	Qualification to Bundesliga
6	Sportfreunde Saarbrücken (R)	30	15	5	10	63	47	+16	35	Relegation to Regionalliga Südwest
7	SC Ludwigshafen (R)	30	13	7	10	57	54	+3	33	Relegation to Regionalliga Südwest
8	TuRa Ludwigshafen (R)	30	14	4	12	48	59	−11	32	Relegation to Regionalliga Südwest
9	Saar 05 Saarbrücken (R)	30	10	9	11	44	48	−4	29	Relegation to Regionalliga Südwest
10	TuS Neuendorf (R)	30	12	4	14	54	70	−16	28	Relegation to Regionalliga Südwest
11	VfR Frankenthal (R)	30	10	4	16	57	74	−17	24	Relegation to Regionalliga Südwest
12	FSV Mainz 05 (R)	30	8	7	15	33	51	−18	23	Relegation to Regionalliga Südwest
13	VfR Kaiserslautern (R)	30	7	8	15	35	53	−18	22	Relegation to Regionalliga Südwest
14	BSC Oppau (R)	30	9	4	17	43	66	−23	22	Relegation to Regionalliga Südwest
15	Eintracht Kreuznach (R)	30	7	5	18	35	56	−21	19	Relegation to Regionalliga Südwest
16	SV Niederlahnstein (R)	30	0	3	27	19	136	−117	3	Relegation to Regionalliga Südwest

Source: RSSSF.com
Rules for classification: 1) Points;
(R) Relegated

== Oberliga Süd ==
The 1962–63 season saw two new clubs in the league, KSV Hessen Kassel and TSG Ulm 1846, both promoted from the 2. Oberliga Süd. The league's top scorers were Kurt Haseneder (1. FC Nürnberg), Rudolf Brunnenmeier (TSV 1860 München) and Rainer Ohlhauser (FC Bayern Munich), all three with 24 goals.

Pos	Team	Pld	W	D	L	GF	GA	GD	Pts	Qualification or relegation
1	TSV 1860 München	30	19	6	5	72	38	+34	44	Qualification for German championship & Bundesliga
2	1. FC Nürnberg	30	18	5	7	87	41	+46	41	Qualification for German championship & Bundesliga
3	FC Bayern Munich (R)	30	18	4	8	67	52	+15	40	Relegation to Regionalliga Süd
4	Eintracht Frankfurt	30	14	11	5	56	32	+24	39	Qualification to Bundesliga
5	Karlsruher SC	30	13	8	9	59	48	+11	34	Qualification to Bundesliga
6	VfB Stuttgart	30	12	8	10	49	40	+9	32	Qualification to Bundesliga
7	Kickers Offenbach (R)	30	11	10	9	57	49	+8	32	Relegation to Regionalliga Süd
8	TSG Ulm 1846 (R)	30	10	10	10	64	58	+6	30	Relegation to Regionalliga Süd
9	SpVgg Fürth (R)	30	11	7	12	49	48	+1	29	Relegation to Regionalliga Süd
10	KSV Hessen Kassel (R)	30	9	11	10	49	57	−8	29	Relegation to Regionalliga Süd
11	FC Schweinfurt 05 (R)	30	10	6	14	43	53	−10	26	Relegation to Regionalliga Süd
12	VfR Mannheim (R)	30	9	8	13	49	62	−13	26	Relegation to Regionalliga Süd
13	FC Bayern Hof (R)	30	9	3	18	40	62	−22	21	Relegation to Regionalliga Süd
14	SSV Reutlingen (R)	30	6	9	15	48	75	−27	21	Relegation to Regionalliga Süd
15	Schwaben Augsburg (R)	30	7	5	18	49	73	−24	19	Relegation to Regionalliga Süd
16	BC Augsburg (R)	30	5	7	18	38	88	−50	17	Relegation to Regionalliga Süd

Source: RSSSF.com
Rules for classification: 1) Points;
(R) Relegated

== German championship ==
The 1963 German football championship was contested by the nine qualified Oberliga teams and won by Borussia Dortmund, defeating 1. FC Köln in the final. The runners-up of the Oberliga Nord and Süd played a pre-qualifying match. The remaining eight clubs then played a home-and-away round in two groups of four. The two group winners then advanced to the final.

=== Qualifying ===
Team 1	Score	Team 2
1. FC Nürnberg	2–1	SV Werder Bremen

=== Group 1 ===
Pos	Team	Pld	W	D	L	GF	GA	GD	Pts	Qualification
1	1. FC Köln (Q)	6	4	2	0	29	12	+17	10	Qualification for final
2	1. FC Nürnberg	6	3	2	1	19	12	+7	8	
3	Hertha BSC Berlin	6	1	1	4	8	19	−11	3	
4	1. FC Kaiserslautern	6	0	3	3	7	20	−13	3	

Source: RSSSF.com
Rules for classification: 1) Points;
(Q) Qualified for the phase indicated

=== Group 2 ===
Pos	Team	Pld	W	D	L	GF	GA	GD	Pts	Qualification
1	Borussia Dortmund (Q)	6	4	1	1	15	7	+8	9	Qualification for final
2	TSV 1860 München	6	3	0	3	10	12	−2	6	
3	Borussia Neunkirchen	6	2	2	2	8	11	−3	6	
4	Hamburger SV	6	1	1	4	7	10	−3	3	

Source: RSSSF.com
Rules for classification: 1) Points;
(Q) Qualified for the phase indicated

=== Final ===
Team 1	Score	Team 2
Borussia Dortmund	3–1	1. FC Köln
