= Fritz Ewert =

German footballer

Personal information
- Date of birth: 9 February 1937
- Place of birth: Düsseldorf, Germany
- Date of death: 16 March 1990 (aged 53)
- Place of death: Heimerzheim, West Germany
- Position: Goalkeeper

Senior career*
Years	Team	Apps	(Gls)
- TuRU Düsseldorf
1957–1966	1. FC Köln	114	(0)
1966–1967	AZ		

International career
1959–1964	Germany	4	(0)
- * Club domestic league appearances and goals

Fritz Ewert (9 February 1937 in Düsseldorf – 16 March 1990 in Heimerzheim) was a German football player. He spent three seasons in the Bundesliga with 1. FC Köln. He represented Germany in four friendlies.

== Honours ==
- Bundesliga champion: 1963–64
- Bundesliga runner-up: 1964–65
