= Hans Sturm (footballer) =

German footballer (1935–2007)

Personal information
- Date of birth: 3 September 1935
- Place of birth: Schönau an der Katzbach, Germany
- Date of death: 20 June 2007 (aged 71)
- Place of death: Cologne, Germany
- Position: Forward

Youth career
- 1951–1952: 1. FC Köln

Senior career*
| Years | Team | Apps | (Gls) |
| 1955–1963 | 1. FC Köln^{(OL West)} | 233 | (66) |
| 1963–1967 | 1. FC Köln^{(Bundesliga)} | 113 | (17) |
| 1967–1971 | Viktoria Köln | 107 | (29) |
| Total | | 453 | (112) |

International career
| 1958–1962 | West Germany | 3 | (0) |
- * Club domestic league appearances and goals

Hans Sturm (3 September 1935 – 20 June 2007) was a German footballer who played as a forward.

The goalscoring inside right midfielder, who won the first Bundesliga trophy with 1. FC Köln in 1964, played just one of his three internationals for West Germany outside a FIFA World Cup. Therefore, he was part at the 1958 FIFA World Cup and at the 1962 FIFA World Cup, playing one match on each occasion.

With 1. FC Köln, Sturm also won the West German football championship in 1962.

Sturm was born in Schönau an der Katzbach, Lower Silesia and died in Cologne. His son Ralf (born 18 October 1968) was a striker for 1. FC Köln in the Bundesliga himself, netting 28 goals in 121 games in between 1988 and 1994.
