= Borussia Neunkirchen =

German football club

- Full name: Borussia, Verein für Bewegungspiele e.V., Neunkirchen
- Founded: 1905; 120 years ago
- Ground: Ellenfeldstadion
- Capacity: 23,000
- Chairman: Alexander Kunz
- Manager: Thorsten Lahm
- League: Saarlandliga (VI)
- 2023–24: Saarlandliga, 4th of 18
- Website: www.borussia-neunkirchen.de
Home colours	Away colours	Third colours

Borussia VfB Neunkirchen is a German association football club based in Neunkirchen, Saarland. The club SC Borussia Neunkirchen was founded out of the 1907 merger of FC 1905 Borussia and SC Neunkirchen.

== History ==
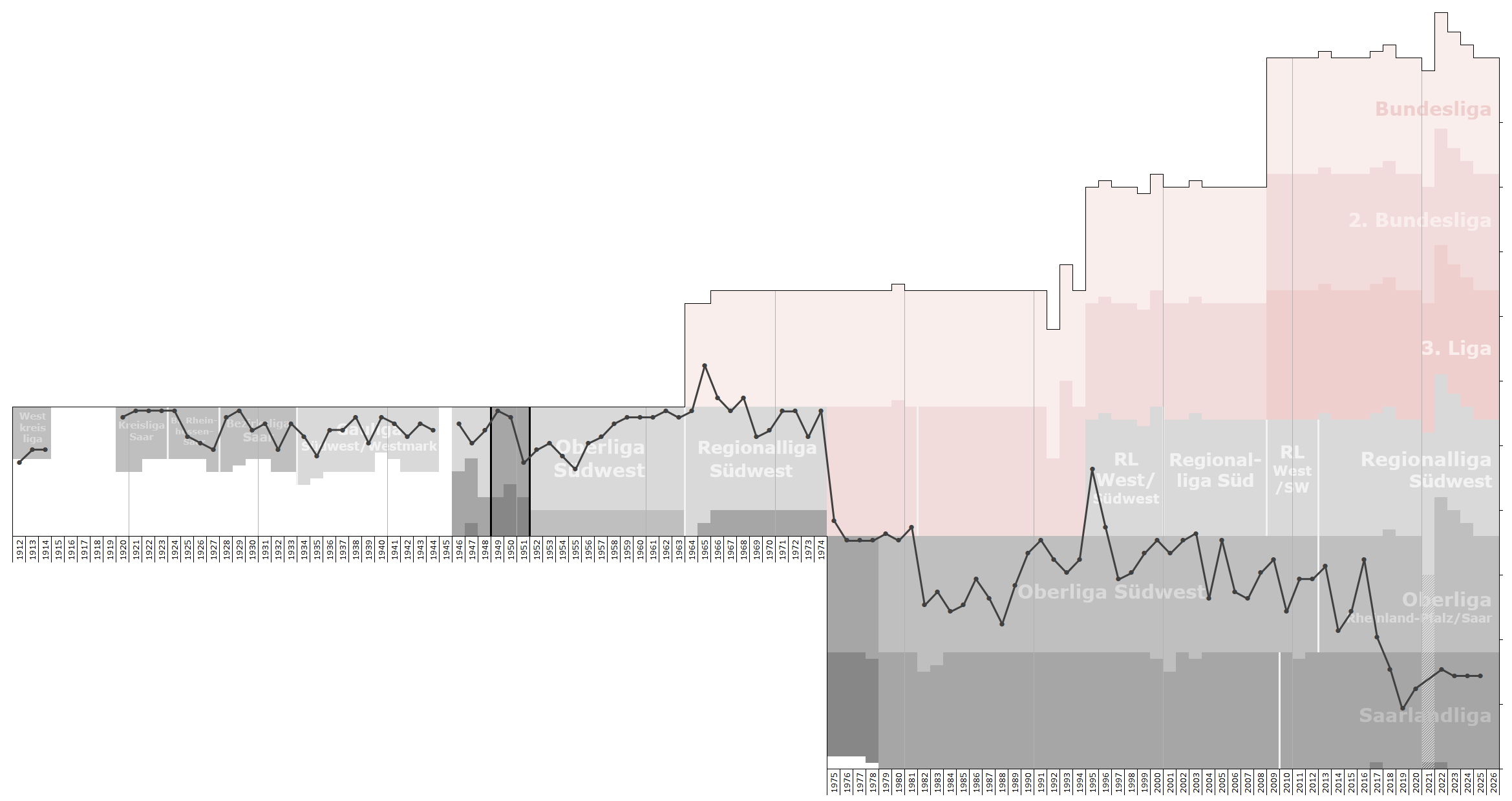
Historical chart of Borussia Neunkirchen league performance

From 1912 through to 1963 the club had an uninterrupted record of first division play including the Kreisliga Saar, Bezirksliga Rhein-Saar and selection to the Gauliga, formed in 1933 through the reorganization of German football under the Third Reich. Borussia remained at this level, in the Gauliga Südwest/Mainhessen, throughout the league's history, with good results but not winning a league championship. Like other organizations in the country, including sports and football associations, Borussia was dissolved by the Allied occupation authorities after World War II, but was quickly reformed under its current name.

The club played in the French-occupied Saarland and the French made various efforts to see the state become independent of Germany or join France. In sport this was manifested as separate 1952 Olympic and 1954 World Cup teams for Saarland, the establishment of a short-lived football league for the state, and the German club 1. FC Saarbrücken playing in the French second division. Neunkirchen played in the Saarland Ehrenliga from 1949 to 1951, winning the title in the first year and finishing as runner-up the next. They were able to re-join the DFB (Deutscher Fußball-Bund or German Football Association) after the 1950–51 season in the Oberliga Südwest.

Despite their record of continuous play at the top flight, Neunkirchen was not one of the sixteen sides selected for play in the Bundesliga – Germany's new professional football league – at its formation. Along with FK Pirmasens and Wormatia Worms, they were bypassed in favour of 1. FC Saarbrücken, even though they all had better records than the chosen side. More than a few protests were lodged as 1. FC appeared to have gained entry based simply on their affiliation with a member of the league selection committee. Their entry was delayed by only a year as they were able to play their way into the upper league through the promotion rounds after winning the Regionalliga Südwest.

Their stay in the Bundesliga was short-lived. After a mid-table result in 1965, they would be relegated the following season after a 17th-place finish. They won the Regionalliga Südwest again after being sent down and returned to the Bundesliga to another 17th-place finish and relegation.

Neunkirchen spent another seven years playing tier II football before slipping to the Amateurliga Saarland (III). Through the mid-1970s and into the early 1980s the club bounced up and down between these levels of play, before settling in for a decade and a half at tier III. The team slipped again in 1996 to the Oberliga Südwest (IV). They won their division in 2005 but declined the opportunity to apply for a license and promotion to the third division because of financial problems that have plagued the club since 2003. From 2012 to 2013 the Oberliga Südwest was renamed Oberliga Rheinland-Pfalz/Saar, with Borussia continuing in this league.

In April 2015 the club had to declare insolvency with a debt of €280,000.

== Honours ==
The club's honours:

=== League ===
- Oberliga Südwest (I)
  - Champions: 1962
  - Runners-up: 1959, 1960, 1961, 1963
- Bezirksliga Rheinhessen-Saar (I)
  - Champions: 1924
- Bezirksliga Rhein-Saar (Saar division) (I)
  - Champions: 1929
- Kreisliga Saar (I)
  - Champions: 1921, 1922, 1923
- Regionalliga Südwest (II)
  - Champions: 1964, 1967, 1971, 1972, 1974
- Oberliga Südwest (III-IV)
  - Champions: 1980, 1991, 2000, 2002, 2005
- Amateurliga Saarland (III)
  - Champions: 1976, 1977, 1978
- Ehrenliga Saarland (II)
  - Champions: 1949
  - Runners-up: 1950

=== Cup ===
- Southern German Cup
  - Winners: 1921
- Saarland Cup (Tiers III-VII)
  - Winners: 1978, 1985, 1986, 1990, 1992, 1996, 2003
  - Runners-up: 1995, 1997, 2001, 2008, 2010

== Recent seasons ==
The recent season-by-season performance of the club:

Season	Division	Tier	Position
1951–52	Oberliga Südwest	I	7th
1952–53	Oberliga Südwest	I	6th
1953–54	Oberliga Südwest	I	8th
1954–55	Oberliga Südwest	I	10th
1955–56	Oberliga Südwest	I	6th
1956–57	Oberliga Südwest	I	5th
1957–58	Oberliga Südwest	I	3rd
1958–59	Oberliga Südwest	I	2nd
1959–60	Oberliga Südwest	I	2nd
1960–61	Oberliga Südwest	I	2nd
1961–62	Oberliga Südwest	I	1st
1962–63	Oberliga Südwest	I	2nd ↓
1963–64	Regionalliga Südwest	II	1st ↑
1964–65	Bundesliga	I	10th
1965–66	Bundesliga	I	17th ↓
1966–67	Regionalliga Südwest	II	1st ↑
1967–68	Bundesliga	I	17th ↓
1968–69	Regionalliga Südwest	II	5th
1969–70	Regionalliga Südwest	II	4th
1970–71	Regionalliga Südwest	II	1st
1971–72	Regionalliga Südwest	II	1st
1972–73	Regionalliga Südwest	II	5th
1973–74	Regionalliga Südwest	II	1st
1974–75	2. Bundesliga Süd	II	18th ↓
1975–76	Amateurliga Saarland	III	1st
1976–77	Amateurliga Saarland	III	1st
1977–78	Amateurliga Saarland	III	1st ↑
1978–79	2. Bundesliga Süd	II	20th ↓
1979–80	Oberliga Südwest	III	1st ↑
1980–81	2. Bundesliga Süd	II	19th ↓
1981–82	Oberliga Südwest	III	11th
1982–83	Oberliga Südwest	III	9th
1983–84	Oberliga Südwest	III	12th
1984–85	Oberliga Südwest	III	11th
1985–86	Oberliga Südwest	III	7th
1986–87	Oberliga Südwest	III	10th
1987–88	Oberliga Südwest	III	14th
1988–89	Oberliga Südwest	III	8th
1989–90	Oberliga Südwest	III	3rd
1990–91	Oberliga Südwest	III	1st
1991–92	Oberliga Südwest	III	4th
1992–93	Oberliga Südwest	III	6th
1993–94	Oberliga Südwest	III	4th
1994–95	Regionalliga West/Südwest	III	8th
1995–96	Regionalliga West/Südwest	III	18th ↓
1996–97	Oberliga Südwest	IV	7th
1997–98	Oberliga Südwest	IV	6th
1998–99	Oberliga Südwest	IV	3rd
1999–2000	Oberliga Südwest	IV	1st
2000–01	Oberliga Südwest	IV	3rd
2001–02	Oberliga Südwest	IV	1st ↑
2002–03	Regionalliga Süd	III	19th ↓
2003–04	Oberliga Südwest	IV	10th
2004–05	Oberliga Südwest	IV	1st
2005–06	Oberliga Südwest	IV	9th
2006–07	Oberliga Südwest	IV	10th
2007–08	Oberliga Südwest	IV	6th ↓
2008–09	Oberliga Südwest	V	4th
2009–10	Oberliga Südwest	V	12th
2010–11	Oberliga Südwest	V	7th
2011–12	Oberliga Südwest	V	7th
2012–13	Oberliga Rheinland-Pfalz/Saar	V	5th
2013–14	Oberliga Rheinland-Pfalz/Saar	V	15th
2014–15	Oberliga Rheinland-Pfalz/Saar	V	12th
2015–16	Oberliga Rheinland-Pfalz/Saar	V	4th
2016–17	Oberliga Rheinland-Pfalz/Saar	V	17th ↓
2017–18	Saarlandliga	VI	3rd
2018–19	Saarlandliga	VI	9th
2019–20	Saarlandliga	VI	6th
2020–21	Saarlandliga	VI	4th
2021–22	Saarlandliga	VI	3rd
2022–23	Saarlandliga	VI	4th
2023–24	Saarlandliga	VI	4th
2024–25	Saarlandliga	VI	4th
2025–26	Saarlandliga	VI	

- With the introduction of the Regionalligas in 1994 and the 3. Liga in 2008 as the new third tier, below the 2. Bundesliga, all leagues below dropped one tier. The Saarlandliga was introduced in 2009 and replaced the Verbandsliga Saarland at the sixth tier of football in the Saarland. In 2012 the Oberliga Südwest was renamed Oberliga Rheinland-Pfalz/Saar.

↑ Promoted	↓ Relegated

== Current squad ==
As of 1 June 2015

Note: Flags indicate national team as defined under FIFA eligibility rules; some limited exceptions apply. Players may hold more than one non-FIFA nationality.

No.	Pos.	Nation	Player
—	GK	(France) FRA	Sebastien Flauss
—	GK	(Germany) GER	Robert Lehmann
—	GK	(Germany) GER	Francesco Rino
—	DF	(Germany) GER	Andreas Backmann
—	DF	(Germany) GER	Tim Cullmann
—	DF		Alexandro Gallace
—	DF	(Germany) GER	Armend Haliti
—	DF	(Germany) GER	Espoire Lenda Mbote
—	DF	(Germany) GER	Florian Röder
—	DF	(Germany) GER	Andy Steis
—	MF	(Germany) GER	Albert Becker
—	MF	(Germany) GER	Mefail Kadrija
—	MF	(Germany) GER	Jens Kirchen

No.	Pos.	Nation	Player
—	MF	(Germany) GER	Abdul Kizmaz
—	MF	(Germany) GER	Yannick Bach
—	MF	(Germany) GER	Marc Leibold
—	MF	(Germany) GER	Dennis Serr
—	MF	(Germany) GER	Giuseppe Simonetta
—	MF	(Germany) GER	Anthony Weston
—	MF	(Germany) GER	Felix Wölflinger
—	FW	(Germany) GER	Felix Dausend
—	FW	(Germany) GER	Andreas Haas
—	FW	(Germany) GER	Heraldo Jorrin
—	FW	(Germany) GER	Faruk Ljaic
—	FW	(Italy) ITA	Francesco Laino
