= List of Borussia Dortmund players =

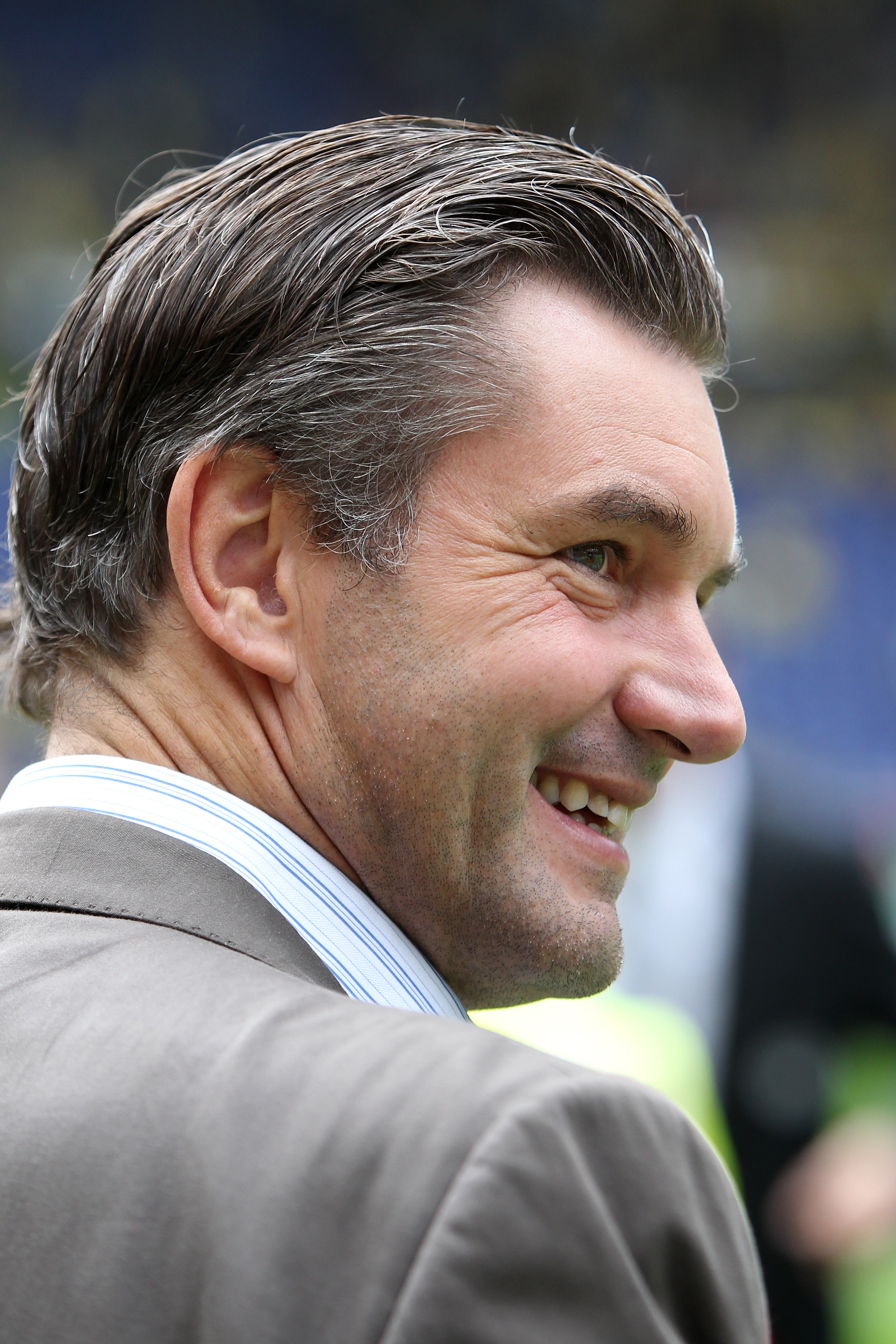
Michael Zorc made a record 572 first team appearances for Borussia Dortmund

Borussia Dortmund is a German football club based in Dortmund, North Rhine-Westphalia. The team plays in the Bundesliga – the highest tier in the German football league system. The club was founded in 1909.

The following is a list of the players with the most first team appearances and goals for the club. This consists of appearances and goals in the Bundesliga, 2. Bundesliga North, Regionalliga West, DFB-Pokal, DFL-Ligapokal, DFL-Supercup, European Cup / UEFA Champions League, UEFA Cup / UEFA Europa League, UEFA Super Cup, UEFA Cup Winners' Cup, Intercontinental Cup, Oberliga West and the finals of the German football championship.

== Players ==
As of 7 November 2026

Bold signifies current Borussia Dortmund players.

Spent their entire professional career with Borussia Dortmund.

List of Borussia Dortmund players with 20 or more appearances
Player	Nationality	Position	Dortmund career	Appearances	Goals
August Lenz	Germany	FW	1930–1949	49	32
Herbert Erdmann	Germany	FW	1939–1940; 1947–1950	59	33
Pat Koschmieder	Germany	DF	1939–1955	179	1
Heinrich Ruhmhofer	Germany	DF	1943–1951	74	0
Alfred Preißler	Germany	FW	1945–1950; 1952–1959	274	177
Friedel Ibel	Germany	FW	1946–1952	58	6
Werner Erdmann	Germany	FW	1947–1952	86	37
Erwin Halfen	Germany	DF	1947–1953	106	1
Wilhelm Kronsbein	Germany	GK	1947–1950	47	0
Max Michallek	Germany	DF	1947–1960	326	20
Herbert Sandmann	Germany	DF	1947–1949; 1951–1960	210	40
Erich Schanko	Germany	MF	1947–1957	223	11
Edmond Kasperski	Germany	FW	1948–1953	136	66
Günter Rau	Germany	GK	1948–1959	74	0
Herbert Hammer	Germany	DF	1949–1950	26	0
Rudi Schulz	Germany	MF	1949–1950	31	10
Hans Flügel	Germany	FW	1950–1957	129	49
Josef Linneweber	Germany	FW	1950–1953	37	20
Alfred Mikuda	Germany	DF	1950–1953	83	0
Kurt Sahm	Germany	FW	1950–1951; 1952–1953	45	5
Friedrich Vogt	Germany	GK	1950–1953	26	0
Erich Wieding	Germany	DF	1950–1953	41	0
Ewald Wieschner	Germany	FW	1950–1957	99	2
Alfred Niepieklo	Germany	MF	1951–1960	201	125
Elwin Schlebrowski	Germany	MF	1951–1960	206	16
Wilhelm Burgsmüller	Germany	DF	1952–1964	289	1
Franz Farke	Germany	FW	1952–1953	23	18
Heinz Kwiatkowski	Germany	GK	1952–1965	340	0
Günther Falke	Germany	DF	1953–1955	55	0
Helmut Kapitulski	Germany	MF	1953–1957	94	21
Adolf Luckenbach	Germany	MF	1953–1955	39	2
Alfred Kelbassa	Germany	FW	1954–1963	218	124
Wolfgang Peters	Germany	FW	1954–1963	236	26
Willi Schumacher	Germany	MF	1954–1958	28	3
Theo Berning	Germany	MF	1955–1960	49	13
Helmut Bracht	Germany	MF	1955–1964	248	9
Aki Schmidt	Germany	MF	1956–1968	331	91
Hans-Georg Dulz	Germany	MF	1957–1959	39	13
Friedhelm Meyer	Germany	DF	1957–1959	23	0
Hans Michel	Germany	DF	1957–1960	36	1
Hans Cieslarczyk	Germany	FW	1958–1962	39	7
Friedhelm Konietzka	Germany	FW	1958–1965	196	155
Gerhard Cyliax	Germany	DF	1959–1968	246	36
Lothar Geisler	Germany	DF	1959–1967	144	1
Jürgen Schütz	Germany	FW	1959–1963	214	143
Rolf Thiemann	Germany	DF	1959–1962	45	1
Lothar Emmerich	Germany	FW	1960–1969	249	148
Dieter Kurrat	Germany	MF	1960–1974	382	21
Horst Steinkuhl	Germany	MF	1960–1962	28	0
Wolfgang Paul	Germany	DF	1961–1971	239	9
Wilhelm Sturm	Germany	MF	1961–1971	286	23
Bernhard Wessel	Germany	GK	1961–1969	134	0
Theodor Redder	Germany	DF	1962–1969	143	2
Hans Tilkowski	Germany	GK	1962–1967	99	0
Reinhold Wosab	Germany	FW	1962–1971	275	94
Franz Brungs	Germany	FW	1963–1965	70	31
Rudi Assauer	Germany	DF	1964–1970	135	8
Friedhelm Groppe	Germany	MF	1964–1969	44	0
Hermann Straschitz	Germany	MF	1964–1966	30	5
Sigfried Held	Germany	FW	1965–1971; 1977–1979	259	53
Stan Libuda	Germany	FW	1965–1968	85	10
Jürgen Weber	Germany	MF	1965–1968	20	4
Willi Neuberger	Germany	DF	1966–1971	164	33
Gerd Peehs	Germany	DF	1966–1973	205	7
Horst Trimhold	Germany	MF	1966–1971	109	16
Klaus Brakelmann	Germany	DF	1967–1971	50	0
Dietmar Erler	Germany	FW	1968–1970	31	2
Klaus Günther	Germany	GK	1968–1971	39	0
Werner Weist	Germany	FW	1968–1971	79	37
Theo Bücker	Germany	MF	1969–1973	129	40
Ferdinand Heidkamp	Germany	DF	1969–1971	57	2
Alfred Kohlhäufl	Germany	DF	1969–1970	23	1
Branko Rasovic	Montenegro	DF	1969–1974	125	0
Theodor Rieländer	Germany	MF	1969–1972	49	7
Jürgen Rynio	Germany	GK	1969–1974	106	0
Hans-Joachim Andree	Germany	DF	1970–1973	83	2
Manfred Ritschel	Germany	FW	1970–1972	65	9
Dieter Weinkauff	Germany	FW	1970–1972	55	16
Horst Bertram	Germany	GK	1971–1983	258	0
Walter Hohnhausen	Germany	FW	1971–1972	27	3
Siegfried Köstler	Germany	FW	1971–1973	66	10
Werner Lorant	Germany	MF	1971–1973	50	0
Reinhold Mathes	Germany	DF	1971–1972	24	0
Dieter Mietz	Germany	DF	1971–1972	35	0
Alfons Sikora	Germany	FW	1971–1972	21	0
Jürgen Wilhelm	Germany	FW	1971–1973	38	13
Horst Bertl	Germany	FW	1972–1974	66	26
Karl-Heinz Brücken	Germany	FW	1972–1974	30	11
Peter Czernotzky	Germany	DF	1972–1974	68	4
Helmut Nerlinger	Germany	DF	1972–1978	169	17
Klaus Ondera	Germany	FW	1972–1973	30	6
Helmut Schmidt	Germany	MF	1972–1974	57	3
Friedhelm Schwarze	Germany	DF	1972–1977	98	3
Egwin Wolf	Germany	MF	1972–1979	183	27
Wolfgang Berg	Germany	DF	1973–1975	38	3
Hans-Werner Hartl	Germany	FW	1973–1977	130	41
Willi Mumme	Germany	FW	1973–1974	34	4
Burkhard Segler	Germany	MF	1973–1979	200	54
Klaus Ackermann	Germany	FW	1974–1979	118	11
Dieter Goldbach	Germany	MF	1974–1975	28	4
Lothar Huber	Germany	DF	1974–1986	372	50
Ernst Savkovic	Germany	DF	1974–1976	58	0
Hans-Gerd Schildt	Germany	FW	1974–1977	87	16
Zoltán Varga	Hungary	FW	1974–1976	61	11
Mirko Votava	Germany	MF	1974–1982	297	32
Hans-Joachim Wagner	Germany	DF	1974–1983	244	13
Peter Geyer	Germany	FW	1975–1981	216	48
Gerd Kasperski	Germany	FW	1975–1977	37	17
Wolfgang Vöge	Germany	FW	1975–1980	127	32
Manfred Burgsmüller	Germany	FW	1976–1983	252	158
Erwin Kostedde	Germany	FW	1976–1977	54	26
Willi Lippens	Netherlands	FW	1976–1979	74	16
Herbert Meyer	Germany	DF	1976–1980	90	2
Wolfgang Frank	Germany	FW	1977–1980	39	14
Werner Schneider	Germany	DF	1977–1981	139	7
Amand Theis	Germany	DF	1977–1980	94	7
Herbert Hein	Germany	DF	1978–1984	114	2
Eike Immel	Germany	GK	1978–1986	280	0
Norbert Runge	Germany	FW	1978–1980	24	5
Norbert Dörmann	Germany	DF	1979–1981	38	1
Paul Holz	Germany	MF	1979–1981	25	0
Meinolf Koch	Germany	MF	1979–1986	157	12
Theo Schneider	Germany	FW	1979–1982	54	8
Rüdiger Abramczik	Germany	FW	1980–1983	102	34
Siegfried Bönighausen	Germany	DF	1980–1983	50	2
Atli Eðvaldsson	Iceland	FW	1980–1981	33	11
Erdal Keser	Turkey	FW	1980–1984; 1986–1987	116	30
Rolf Rüssmann	Germany	DF	1980–1985	161	18
Heinz-Werner Eggeling	Germany	FW	1981–1984	32	3
Bernd Klotz	Germany	FW	1981–1984	118	31
Ralf Loose	Germany	DF	1981–1986	136	13
Franz-Josef Tenhagen	Germany	MF	1981–1984	98	1
Michael Zorc	Germany	MF	1981–1998	572	159
Michael Lusch	Germany	MF	1982–1993	242	13
Marcel Răducanu	Romania	MF	1982–1986	186	35
Ulrich Bittcher	Germany	MF	1983–1987	92	4
Werner Dreßel	Germany	FW	1983–1986	56	5
Bernd Storck	Germany	DF	1983–1989	168	10
Ingo Anderbrügge	Germany	MF	1984–1988	85	11
André Egli	Switzerland	DF	1984–1985	33	6
Günter Kutowski	Germany	DF	1984–1996	345	5
Frank Pagelsdorf	Germany	MF	1984–1988	126	11
Wolfgang Schüler	Germany	FW	1984–1988	65	16
Daniel Simmes	Germany	FW	1984–1988	125	15
Jürgen Wegmann	Germany	FW	1984–1986; 1989–1992	138	46
Horst Hrubesch	Germany	FW	1985–1986	21	4
Dirk Hupe	Germany	DF	1985–1989	110	10
Wolfgang de Beer	Germany	GK	1986–2001	217	0
Norbert Dickel	Germany	FW	1986–1990	108	50
Thomas Helmer	Germany	DF	1986–1992	223	22
Frank Mill	Germany	FW	1986–1994	227	66
Gerhard Kleppinger	Germany	DF	1987–1988	43	1
Murdo MacLeod	Scotland	MF	1987–1990	129	5
Günter Breitzke	Germany	MF	1988–1992	101	21
Thomas Kroth	Germany	MF	1988–1990	65	0
Andreas Möller	Germany	MF	1988–1990; 1994–2000	301	88
Robert Nikolic	Germany	DF	1988–1991	57	0
Michael Rummenigge	Germany	MF	1988–1993	193	45
Martin Driller	Germany	FW	1989–1991	49	6
Sergei Gorlukovich	Russia	DF	1989–1992	53	2
Uwe Grauer	Germany	DF	1989–1994	25	1
Michael Schulz	Germany	DF	1989–1994	166	7
Stefan Sterath	Germany	MF	1989–1991	21	1
Thomas Franck	Germany	MF	1990–1996	125	4
Steffen Karl	Germany	MF	1990–1993	87	5
Stefan Klos	Germany	GK	1990–1998	339	0
Gerhard Poschner	Germany	MF	1990–1994	136	14
Flemming Povlsen	Denmark	FW	1990–1995	146	23
Peter Quallo	Germany	DF	1990–1992	28	0
Stéphane Chapuisat	Switzerland	FW	1991–1999	284	123
Knut Reinhardt	Germany	MF	1991–1998	225	8
Bodo Schmidt	Germany	DF	1991–1996	155	3
Stefan Reuter	Germany	MF	1992–2004	421	15
Lothar Sippel	Germany	MF	1992–1994	51	7
René Tretschok	Germany	MF	1992–1997	85	11
Ned Zelic	Australia	MF	1992–1995	56	1
Steffen Freund	Germany	MF	1993–1998	161	6
Lars Ricken	Germany	MF	1993–2008	407	69
Karl-Heinz Riedle	Germany	FW	1993–1997	112	36
Matthias Sammer	Germany	DF	1993–1998	153	23
Vladimir But	Russia	MF	1994–2000	100	10
Júlio César	Brazil	DF	1994–1998	116	10
Martin Kree	Germany	DF	1994–1999	114	3
Patrik Berger	Czech Republic	MF	1995–1996	36	4
Heiko Herrlich	Germany	FW	1995–2004	183	56
Jürgen Kohler	Germany	FW	1995–2002	250	18
Rubén Sosa	Uruguay	FW	1995–1996	27	3
Ibrahim Tanko	Ghana	FW	1995–2001	71	3
Wolfgang Feiersinger	Austria	DF	1996–2000	83	0
Jörg Heinrich	Germany	DF	1996–1998; 2000–2003	195	24
Jovan Kirovski	United States	FW	1996–2000	29	2
Paul Lambert	Scotland	MF	1996–1997	64	2
Paulo Sousa	Portugal	MF	1996–1997	40	2
Christian Timm	Germany	FW	1996–1999	20	0
Sergej Barbarez	Bosnia and Herzegovina	FW	1998–2000	49	7
Karsten Baumann	Germany	DF	1998–2000	46	0
Dedé	Brazil	DF	1998–2011	398	13
Christian Nerlinger	Germany	MF	1998–2001	73	4
Alfred Nijhuis	Netherlands	DF	1998–2001	75	6
Bachirou Salou	Togo	FW	1998–1999	29	6
Otto Addo	Ghana	MF	1999–2005	98	16
Fredi Bobic	Germany	FW	1999–2002	80	23
Evanílson	Brazil	DF	1999–2005	170	4
Victor Ikpeba	Nigeria	FW	1999–2002	37	4
Jens Lehmann	Germany	GK	1999–2003	179	0
Giuseppe Reina	Germany	FW	1999–2003	114	19
Miroslav Stević	Serbia	MF	1999–2002	121	8
Christian Wörns	Germany	DF	1999–2008	303	15
Christoph Metzelder	Germany	DF	2000–2007	158	2
Sunday Oliseh	Nigeria	MF	2000–2005	72	3
Márcio Amoroso	Brazil	FW	2001–2004	89	43
Guy Demel	Ivory Coast	DF	2001–2005	42	0
Ewerthon	Brazil	FW	2001–2005	154	54
Jan Koller	Czech Republic	FW	2001–2006	184	79
Florian Kringe	Germany	MF	2001–2012	171	19
Ahmed Madouni	Algeria	DF	2001–2005	82	3
Tomáš Rosický	Czech Republic	MF	2001–2006	189	24
Jan-Derek Sørensen	Norway	FW	2001–2002	34	1
Juan Fernández	Argentina	DF	2002–2005	22	0
Torsten Frings	Germany	MF	2002–2004	63	12
Sebastian Kehl	Germany	MF	2002–2015	362	22
David Odonkor	Germany	FW	2002–2006	90	3
Roman Weidenfeller	Germany	GK	2002–2018	453	0
André Bergdölmo	Norway	DF	2003–2005	37	0
Niclas Jensen	Denmark	DF	2003–2005	53	2
Sahr Senesie	Germany	FW	2003–2006	30	1
Guillaume Warmuz	France	GK	2003–2005	29	0
Markus Brzenska	Germany	DF	2004–2009	89	7
Salvatore Gambino	Germany	FW	2004–2006	52	5
Marc-André Kruska	Germany	MF	2004–2009	107	2
Delron Buckley	South Africa	FW	2005–2009	70	1
Philipp Degen	Switzerland	DF	2005–2008	75	1
Nuri Şahin	Turkey	MF	2005–2011; 2013–2018	274	26
Ebi Smolarek	Poland	FW	2005–2007	87	26
Martin Amedick	Germany	DF	2006–2008	38	2
Alexander Frei	Switzerland	FW	2006–2009	83	37
Steven Pienaar	South Africa	MF	2006–2008	27	0
Tinga	Brazil	MF	2006–2010	113	12
Nelson Valdez	Paraguay	FW	2006–2010	126	18
Jakub Blaszczykowski	Poland	FW	2007–2016	253	32
Giovanni Federico	Italy	MF	2007–2009	36	6
Diego Klimowicz	Argentina	FW	2007–2008	45	11
Robert Kovač	Croatia	DF	2007–2009	34	0
Mladen Petrić	Croatia	FW	2007–2008	36	18
Marc Ziegler	Germany	GK	2007–2010	29	0
Tamás Hajnal	Hungary	MF	2008–2011	58	8
Mats Hummels	Germany	DF	2008–2016; 2019–2024	508	38
Lee Young-pyo	South Korea	DF	2008–2009	22	0
Patrick Owomoyela	Germany	DF	2008–2013	84	3
Antonio Rukavina	Serbia	DF	2008–2009	25	0
Felipe Santana	Brazil	DF	2008–2013	113	8
Marcel Schmelzer	Germany	DF	2008–2022	367	7
Neven Subotić	Serbia	DF	2008–2018	263	18
Mohamed Zidan	Egypt	FW	2008–2012	73	15
Lucas Barrios	Paraguay	FW	2009–2012	102	49
Sven Bender	Germany	MF	2009–2017	224	4
Markus Feulner	Germany	MF	2009–2011	20	0
Kevin Großkreutz	Germany	DF	2009–2015	236	27
Antônio da Silva	Brazil	MF	2010–2012	33	1
Mario Götze	Germany	MF	2010–2013; 2016–2020	219	45
Shinji Kagawa	Japan	MF	2010–2012; 2014–2019	216	60
Mitchell Langerak	Australia	GK	2010–2015	35	0
Robert Lewandowski	Poland	FW	2010–2014	187	103
Łukasz Piszczek	Poland	DF	2010–2021	382	19
İlkay Gündoğan	Germany	MF	2011–2016	157	15
Moritz Leitner	Germany	MF	2011–2016	67	0
Ivan Perišić	Croatia	MF	2011–2013	64	12
Oliver Kirch	Germany	MF	2012–2015	30	1
Marco Reus	Germany	MF	2012–2024	429	170
Julian Schieber	Germany	FW	2012–2014	57	6
Pierre-Emerick Aubameyang	Gabon	FW	2013–2018	213	141
Erik Durm	Germany	DF	2013–2018	97	2
Jonas Hofmann	Germany	MF	2013–2015	59	5
Henrikh Mkhitaryan	Armenia	MF	2013–2016	140	41
Sokratis Papastathopoulos	Greece	DF	2013–2018	198	10
Matthias Ginter	Germany	DF	2014–2017	102	4
Ciro Immobile	Italy	FW	2014–2016	34	10
Miloš Jojić	Serbia	MF	2014–2015	29	4
Adrián Ramos	Colombia	FW	2014–2017	79	19
Roman Bürki	Switzerland	GK	2015–2022	233	0
Gonzalo Castro	Germany	MF	2015–2018	111	12
Julian Weigl	Germany	MF	2015–2019	171	4
Marc Bartra	Spain	DF	2016–2018	51	5
Ousmane Dembélé	France	MF	2016–2017	50	10
Raphaël Guerreiro	Portugal	DF	2016–2023	224	40
Felix Passlack	Germany	DF	2016–2023	55	3
Christian Pulisic	United States	MF	2016–2019	127	19
Sebastian Rode	Germany	MF	2016–2019	22	1
André Schürrle	Germany	FW	2016–2020	51	8
Mahmoud Dahoud	Germany	MF	2017–2023	141	5
Jacob Bruun Larsen	Denmark	FW	2017–2020	41	3
Maximilian Philipp	Germany	FW	2017–2019	51	11
Jadon Sancho	England	MF	2017–2021; 2024	158	53
Jeremy Toljan	Germany	DF	2017–2021	23	1
Ömer Toprak	Turkey	DF	2017–2020	51	0
Andriy Yarmolenko	Ukraine	FW	2017–2018	26	6
Dan-Axel Zagadou	France	DF	2017–2022	92	4
Manuel Akanji	Switzerland	DF	2018–2022	158	4
Paco Alcácer	Spain	FW	2018–2020	47	26
Thomas Delaney	Denmark	MF	2018–2021	88	4
Abdou Diallo	Senegal	DF	2018–2019	38	1
Achraf Hakimi	Morocco	DF	2018–2020	73	12
Marwin Hitz	Switzerland	GK	2018–2022	46	0
Axel Witsel	Belgium	MF	2018–2022	145	13
Marius Wolf	Germany	DF	2018–2024	121	5
Julian Brandt	Germany	MF	2019–2026	307	57
Thorgan Hazard	Belgium	FW	2019–2023	123	18
Mateu Morey	Spain	DF	2019–2024	32	0
Nico Schulz	Germany	DF	2019–2023	61	1
Jude Bellingham	England	MF	2020–2023	132	24
**Emre Can**	Germany	MF	2020–	220	23
Erling Haaland	Norway	FW	2020–2022	89	86
Thomas Meunier	Belgium	DF	2020–2024	83	3
Youssoufa Moukoko	Germany	FW	2020–2025	99	18
Reinier	Brazil	MF	2020–2022	39	1
Giovanni Reyna	United States	MF	2020–2025	148	19
**Gregor Kobel**	Switzerland	GK	2021–	231	0
Donyell Malen	Netherlands	FW	2021–2025	132	39
Marin Pongračić	Croatia	DF	2021–2022	23	0
Steffen Tigges	Germany	FW	2021–2022	23	3
Karim Adeyemi	Germany	FW	2022–2026	146	36
Jamie Gittens	England	FW	2022–2025	107	17
Sébastien Haller	Ivory Coast	FW	2022–2025	41	12
**Alexander Meyer**	Germany	GK	2022–	26	0
Anthony Modeste	France	FW	2022–2023	28	2
Salih Özcan	Turkey	MF	2022–2026	96	0
**Nico Schlotterbeck**	Germany	DF	2022–	171	12
Niklas Süle	Germany	DF	2022–2026	110	2
**Ramy Bensebaini**	Algeria	DF	2023–	114	10
Julien Duranville	Belgium	FW	2023–2026	26	1
Niclas Füllkrug	Germany	FW	2023–2024	43	15
**Felix Nmecha**	Germany	MF	2023–	128	17
**Julian Ryerson**	Norway	DF	2023–	158	7
**Marcel Sabitzer**	Austria	MF	2023–	130	9
**Waldemar Anton**	Germany	DF	2024–	102	6
**Maximilian Beier**	Germany	FW	2024–	106	22
**Yan Couto**	Brazil	DF	2024–	62	3
Pascal Groß	Germany	MF	2024–2026	66	1
**Serhou Guirassy**	Guinea	FW	2024–	110	68
Ian Maatsen	Netherlands	DF	2024	23	3
**Jobe Bellingham**	England	MF	2025–	64	1
**Carney Chukwuemeka**	Austria	MF	2025–	65	5
**Fabio Silva**	Portugal	FW	2025–	54	9
**Daniel Svensson**	Sweden	DF	2025–	82	8

== Club captains ==
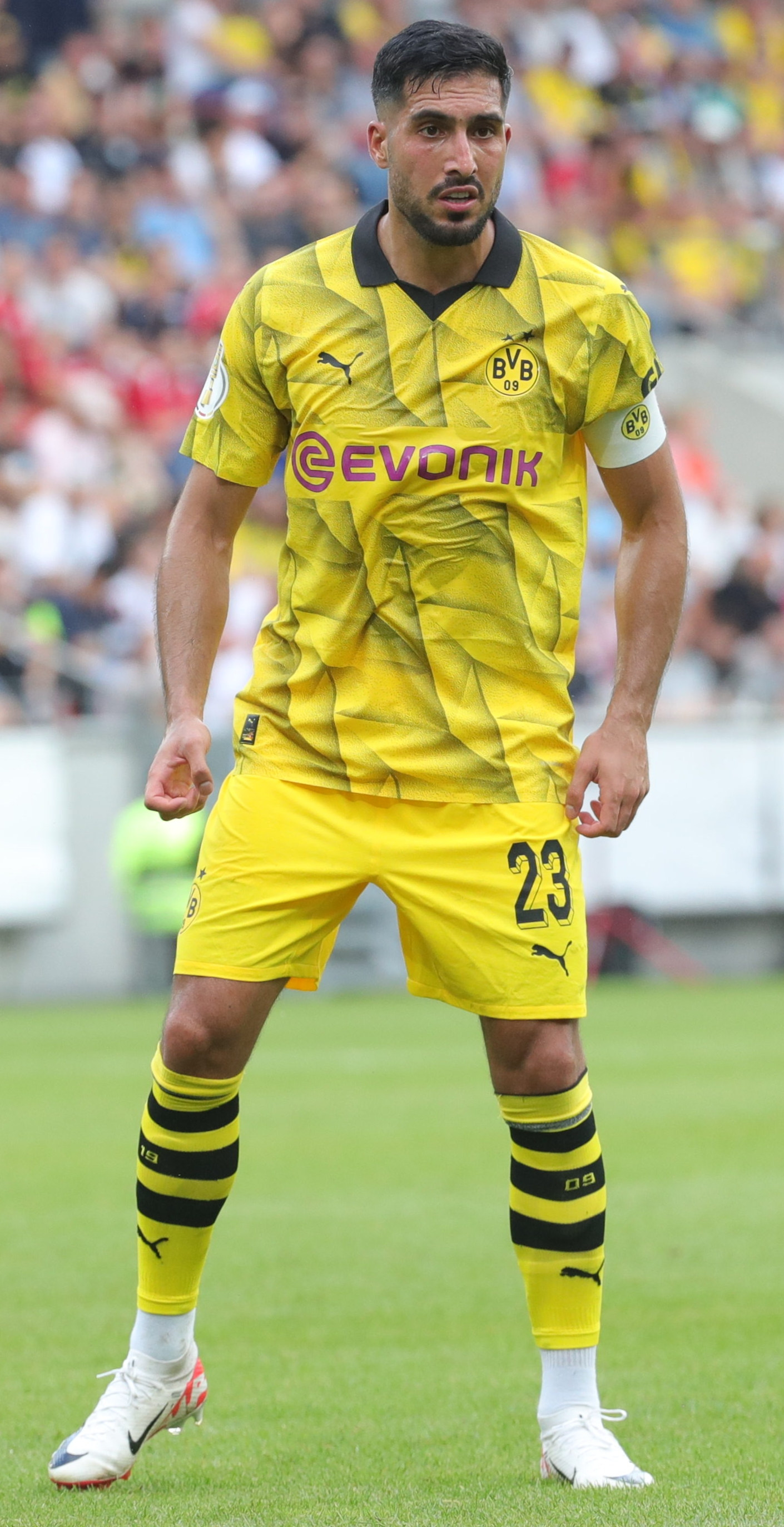
Emre Can, the current club captain

No.	Player	Period
1	(Germany) Aki Schmidt	1963–1965
2	(Germany) Wolfgang Paul	1965–1968
3	(Germany) Sigfried Held	1968–1971
4	(Germany) Dieter Kurrat	1971–1974
5	(Germany) Klaus Ackermann	1974–1977
6	(Germany) Lothar Huber	1977–1979
7	(Germany) Manfred Burgsmüller	1979–1983
8	(Germany) Rolf Rüssmann	1983–1985
9	(Germany) Dirk Hupe	1985–1987
10	(Germany) Frank Mill	1987–1988
11	(Germany) Michael Zorc	1988–1998
12	(Germany) Stefan Reuter	1998–2003
13	(Germany) Christoph Metzelder	2003–2004
14	(Germany) Christian Wörns	2004–2008
15	(Germany) Sebastian Kehl	2008–2014
16	(Germany) Mats Hummels	2014–2016
17	(Germany) Marcel Schmelzer	2016–2018
18	(Germany) Marco Reus	2018–2023
19	(Germany) Emre Can	2023–

== World Cup players ==
The following players have been selected by their country for the FIFA World Cup finals, while playing for Borussia Dortmund.

- (Germany) Heinz Kwiatkowski (1954, 1958)
- (Germany) Alfred Kelbassa (1958)
- (Germany) Wolfgang Peters (1958)
- (Germany) Aki Schmidt (1958)
- (Germany) Lothar Emmerich (1966)
- (Germany) Sigfried Held (1966, 1970)
- (Germany) Wolfgang Paul (1966)
- (Germany) Hans Tilkowski (1966)
- (Germany) Eike Immel (1982, 1986)
- (Germany) Frank Mill (1990)
- (Germany) Andreas Möller (1990)
- (Scotland) Murdo MacLeod (1990)
- (Soviet Union) Sergei Gorlukovich (1990)
- (Argentina) Leonardo Rodríguez (1994)
- (Switzerland) Stéphane Chapuisat (1994)
- (Germany) Karl-Heinz Riedle (1994)
- (Germany) Matthias Sammer (1994)
- (Austria) Wolfgang Feiersinger (1998)
- (Germany) Steffen Freund (1998)
- (Germany) Jörg Heinrich (1998)
- (Germany) Jürgen Kohler (1998)
- (Germany) Andreas Möller (1998)
- (Germany) Stefan Reuter (1998)
- (Germany) Sebastian Kehl (2002, 2006)
- (Germany) Jens Lehmann (2002)
- (Germany) Christoph Metzelder (2002, 2006)
- (Germany) Lars Ricken (2002)
- (Czech Republic) Jan Koller (2006)
- (Czech Republic) Tomáš Rosický (2006)
- (Germany) David Odonkor (2006)
- (Ghana) Matthew Amoah (2006)
- (Poland) Ebi Smolarek (2006)
- (Switzerland) Philipp Degen (2006)
- (Paraguay) Lucas Barrios (2010)
- (Paraguay) Nelson Haedo Valdez (2010)
- (Serbia) Neven Subotić (2010)
- (Australia) Mitchell Langerak (2014)
- (Germany) Erik Durm (2014)
- (Germany) Kevin Großkreutz (2014)
- (Germany) Mats Hummels (2014)
- (Germany) Roman Weidenfeller (2014)
- (Greece) Sokratis Papastathopoulos (2014)
- (Belgium) Michy Batshuayi (2018)
- (Germany) Marco Reus (2018)
- (Japan) Shinji Kagawa (2018)
- (Poland) Łukasz Piszczek (2018)
- (Portugal) Raphaël Guerreiro (2018, 2022)
- (Switzerland) Manuel Akanji (2018)
- (Switzerland) Roman Bürki (2018)
- (Belgium) Thorgan Hazard (2022)
- (Belgium) Thomas Meunier (2022)
- (England) Jude Bellingham (2022)
- (Germany) Karim Adeyemi (2022)
- (Germany) Julian Brandt (2022)
- (Germany) Youssoufa Moukoko (2022)
- (Germany) Nico Schlotterbeck (2022, 2026)
- (Germany) Niklas Süle (2022)
- (Switzerland) Gregor Kobel (2022, 2026)
- (United States) Giovanni Reyna (2022)
- (Algeria) Ramy Bensebaini (2026)
- (Austria) Carney Chukwuemeka (2026)
- (Austria) Marcel Sabitzer (2026)
- (Germany) Waldemar Anton (2026)
- (Germany) Maximilian Beier (2026)
- (Germany) Felix Nmecha (2026)
- (Norway) Julian Ryerson (2026)
- (Sweden) Daniel Svensson (2026)
- (Turkey) Salih Özcan (2026)
