= 1957 German football championship =

1957 German championship
Deutsche Fußballmeisterschaft

Tournament details
- Country: West Germany
- Dates: 25 May – 23 June
- Teams: 9

Final positions
- Champions: Borussia Dortmund; 2nd German title
- Runners-up: Hamburger SV
- European Cup: Borussia Dortmund

Tournament statistics
- Matches played: 14
- Goals scored: 65 (4.64 per match)
- Top goal scorer(s): Alfred Niepieklo; Willi Wenzel (5 goals each)

The 1957 German football championship was the culmination of the football season in the Federal Republic of Germany in 1956–57. Borussia Dortmund were crowned champions for the second time after a group stage and a final. Borussia became the first club since Dresdner SC in 1944 to defend their title won the previous year.

It was Borussia's third appearance in the German final, having lost 3–2 to VfR Mannheim in 1949 and won the championship in 1956, beating Karlsruher SC 4–2. On the strength of this title, the club participated in the 1957–58 European Cup, where it went out to AC Milan in the quarter-finals.

For the losing finalist, Hamburger SV, it was its first appearance in the final since winning the title in 1928.

The format used to determine the German champion was different from the 1956 season. Only two clubs took part in the qualifying round, instead of four. The group stage, eight teams split into two groups of four, was conducted as a single round with games on neutral grounds; previously it had been home-and-away games. As in the past seasons, the two group winners then played the national final.

== Qualified teams ==
The clubs qualified through the 1956–57 Oberliga season:

Club	Qualified from
Hamburger SV	Oberliga Nord champions
Holstein Kiel	Oberliga Nord runners-up
Borussia Dortmund	Oberliga West champions
Duisburger SV	Oberliga West runners-up
Hertha BSC Berlin	Oberliga Berlin champions
1. FC Kaiserslautern	Oberliga Südwest champions
1. FC Saarbrücken	Oberliga Südwest runners-up
1. FC Nürnberg	Oberliga Süd champions
Kickers Offenbach	Oberliga Süd runners-up

== Competition ==
=== Qualifying round ===
Date	Match			Result	Stadium	Attendance
25 May 1957	Kickers Offenbach	–	Holstein Kiel	3–2 aet (0–2, 2–2)	Düsseldorf, Rheinstadion	35,000

=== Group 1 ===
Pos	Team	Pld	W	D	L	GF	GA	GR	Pts	Qualification	HSV	DSV	FCN	FCS
1	Hamburger SV	3	2	1	0	5	3	1.667	5	Advance to final	—	1–1	2–1	2–1
2	Duisburger SV	3	1	2	0	6	4	1.500	4		—	—	—	3–1
3	1. FC Nürnberg	3	0	2	1	5	6	0.833	2		—	2–2	—	—
4	1. FC Saarbrücken	3	0	1	2	4	7	0.571	1		—	—	2–2	—

Source: RSSSF
Rules for classification: 1) Points; 2) Goal ratio.

Date	Match			Result	Stadium	Attendance
2 June 1957	Hamburger SV	–	Duisburger SV	1–1 (0–0)	Berlin, Olympiastadion	40,000
2 June 1957	1. FC Saarbrücken	–	1. FC Nürnberg	2–2 (0–0)	Stuttgart, Neckarstadion	70,000
9 June 1957	Hamburger SV	–	1. FC Nürnberg	2–1 (1–0)	Cologne, Müngersdorfer Stadion	50,000
9 June 1957	Duisburger SV	–	1. FC Saarbrücken	3–1 (2–0)	Frankfurt, Waldstadion	40,000
16 June 1957	Hamburger SV	–	1. FC Saarbrücken	2–1 (2–1)	Düsseldorf, Rheinstadion	32,000
16 June 1957	1. FC Nürnberg	–	Duisburger SV	2–2 (1–0)	Ludwigshafen, Südweststadion	33,000

=== Group 2 ===
Pos	Team	Pld	W	D	L	GF	GA	GR	Pts	Qualification	BVB	KOF	FCK	BSC
1	Borussia Dortmund	3	3	0	0	7	4	1.750	6	Advance to final	—	2–1	—	2–1
2	Kickers Offenbach	3	2	0	1	8	4	2.000	4		—	—	—	—
3	1. FC Kaiserslautern	3	1	0	2	17	8	2.125	2		2–3	1–4	—	14–1
4	Hertha BSC	3	0	0	3	3	19	0.158	0		—	1–3	—	—

Source: RSSSF
Rules for classification: 1) Points; 2) Goal ratio.

Date	Match			Result	Stadium	Attendance
2 June 1957	1. FC Kaiserslautern	–	Hertha BSC Berlin	14–1 (5–1)	Wuppertal, Stadion am Zoo	42,000
2 June 1957	Borussia Dortmund	–	Kickers Offenbach	2–1 (1–1)	Ludwigshafen, Südweststadion	55,000
9 June 1957	1. FC Kaiserslautern	–	Borussia Dortmund	2–3 (0–1)	Hannover, Niedersachsenstadion	75,000
9 June 1957	Hertha BSC Berlin	–	Kickers Offenbach	1–3 (1–2)	Essen, Georg-Melches-Stadion	6,000
16 June 1957	1. FC Kaiserslautern	–	Kickers Offenbach	1–4 (0–3)	Augsburg, Rosenaustadion	40,000
16 June 1957	Borussia Dortmund	–	Hertha BSC	2–1 (1–1)	Braunschweig, Eintracht-Stadion	15,000

=== Final ===
Date	Match			Result	Stadium	Attendance
23 June 1957	Borussia Dortmund	–	Hamburger SV	4–1 (3–1)	Hannover, Niedersachsenstadion	82,000

Borussia Dortmund:
GK	1	(West Germany) Heinz Kwiatkowski
RB	2	(West Germany) Wilhelm Burgsmüller
CB	5	(West Germany) Max Michallek
LB	3	(West Germany) Herbert Sandmann
RH	4	(West Germany) Elwin Schlebrowski
LH	6	(West Germany) Helmut Bracht
OR	7	(West Germany) Wolfgang Peters
IR	8	(West Germany) Alfred Preißler (c)
CF	9	(West Germany) Alfred Kelbassa 16' 25'
IL	10	(West Germany) Alfred Niepieklo 26' 78'
OL	11	(West Germany) Helmut Kapitulski
Manager:
(West Germany) Helmut Schneider

Hamburger SV:
GK	1	(West Germany) Horst Schnoor
RB	2	(West Germany) Rolf Börner
CB	5	(West Germany) Jochen Meinke
LB	3	(West Germany) Jupp Posipal (c)
RH	4	(West Germany) Jürgen Werner
LH	6	(West Germany) Karl-Heinz Liese
OR	7	(West Germany) Walter Schemel
IR	8	(West Germany) Uwe Reuter
CF	9	(West Germany) Uwe Seeler
IL	10	(West Germany) Gerhard Krug 24'
OL	11	(West Germany) Franz Klepacz
Manager:
(West Germany) Günter Mahlmann
