= 1956 German football championship =

1956 German championship
Deutsche Fußballmeisterschaft

Tournament details
- Country: West Germany
- Dates: 5 May – 24 June
- Teams: 9

Final positions
- Champions: Borussia Dortmund; 1st German title
- Runners-up: Karlsruher SC
- European Cup: Borussia Dortmund

Tournament statistics
- Matches played: 29
- Goals scored: 124 (4.28 per match)
- Top goal scorer: Alfred Niepieklo (10 goals)

The 1956 German football championship was the culmination of the football season in West Germany in 1955-56. Borussia Dortmund were crowned champions for the first time in their second final appearance, having previously lost the 1949 German football championship final to VfR Mannheim.

On the strength of this title, the club participated in the 1956–57 European Cup, where it went out to Manchester United 3–2 on aggregate in the quarter-finals.

== Qualified teams ==
The clubs qualified through the 1955–56 Oberliga season:

Club	Qualified from
Hamburger SV	Oberliga Nord champions
Hannover 96	Oberliga Nord runners-up
Borussia Dortmund	Oberliga West champions
Schalke 04	Oberliga West runners-up
Viktoria 89 Berlin	Oberliga Berlin champions
1. FC Kaiserslautern	Oberliga Südwest champions
TuS Neuendorf	Oberliga Südwest runners-up
Karlsruher SC	Oberliga Süd champions
VfB Stuttgart	Oberliga Süd runners-up

== Competition ==
=== First qualifying round ===
The four qualified runners-up played two qualifying rounds to determine the three clubs which advanced to the group stage. The deciding game for the third qualified team had to be replayed after a three-all draw after extra time in the first match.

Team 1	Score	Team 2
Schalke 04	2–1 aet	Hannover 96
VfB Stuttgart	8–0	TuS Neuendorf

=== Second qualifying round ===
Team 1	Score	Team 2
Hannover 96	3–3 aet	TuS Neuendorf

==== Replay ====
Team 1	Score	Team 2
Hannover 96	3–2	TuS Neuendorf

=== Group 1 ===
Pos	Team	Pld	W	D	L	GF	GA	GR	Pts	Qualification	KSC	S04	FCK	H96
1	Karlsruher SC	6	3	1	2	7	5	1.400	7	Advance to final	—	3–2	0–1	0–0
2	Schalke 04	6	3	1	2	16	12	1.333	7		0–3	—	3–1	3–1
3	1. FC Kaiserslautern	6	3	1	2	16	13	1.231	7		0–1	4–4	—	5–3
4	Hannover 96	6	1	1	4	8	17	0.471	3		2–0	0–4	2–5	—

Source: RSSSF
Rules for classification: 1) Points; 2) Goal ratio.

=== Group 2 ===
Pos	Team	Pld	W	D	L	GF	GA	GR	Pts	Qualification	BVB	HSV	VFB	V89
1	Borussia Dortmund	6	4	1	1	19	4	4.750	9	Advance to final	—	5–0	4–1	1–1
2	Hamburger SV	6	4	1	1	14	10	1.400	9		2–1	—	0–0	5–1
3	VfB Stuttgart	6	1	2	3	9	14	0.643	4		0–2	2–4	—	3–1
4	Viktoria Berlin	6	0	2	4	7	21	0.333	2		0–6	1–3	3–3	—

Source: RSSSF
Rules for classification: 1) Points; 2) Goal ratio.

=== Final ===
24 June 1956

Borussia Dortmund	4–2	Karlsruher SC
Niepieklo 15'; Kelbassa 26'; Preißler 53'; Peters 57'		Kunkel 10'; Burgsmüller 66' (o.g.)

Olympiastadion, Berlin
Attendance: 75,000
Referee: A. Dusch (Kaiserslautern)

BORUSSIA DORTMUND:
GK	1	(West Germany) Heinz Kwiatkowski
RB	2	(West Germany) Wilhelm Burgsmüller
CB	5	(West Germany) Max Michallek
LB	3	(West Germany) Herbert Sandmann
RH	4	(West Germany) Elwin Schlebrowski
LH	6	(West Germany) Helmut Bracht
OR	7	(West Germany) Wolfgang Peters
IR	8	(West Germany) Alfred Preißler (c)
CF	9	(West Germany) Alfred Kelbassa
IL	10	(West Germany) Alfred Niepieklo
OL	11	(West Germany) Helmut Kapitulski
Manager:
(West Germany) Helmut Schneider

KARLSRUHE:
GK	1	(West Germany) Rudi Fischer
RB	2	(West Germany) Max Fischer
CB	5	(West Germany) Siegfried Geesmann
LB	3	(West Germany) Walter Baureis (c)
RH	4	(West Germany) Heinz Ruppenstein
LH	6	(West Germany) Herbert Dannenmeier
OR	7	(West Germany) Oswald Traub
IR	8	(West Germany) Kurt Sommerlatt
CF	9	(West Germany) Heinz Beck
IL	10	(West Germany) Ernst Kunkel
OL	11	(West Germany) Bernhard Termath
Manager:
(Austria) Adolf Patek
