= 1956–57 Oberliga =

West German football league season

Oberliga
- Season: 1956–57
- Champions: Hamburger SV Hertha BSC Berlin Borussia Dortmund: 1. FC Kaiserslautern; 1. FC Nürnberg
- Relegated: Arminia Hannover Heider SV BFC Südring Rapide Wedding Schwarz-Weiß Essen Borussia München-Gladbach SpVgg Andernach Sportfreunde Saarbrücken Schwaben Augsburg Freiburger FC
- German champions: Borussia Dortmund; 2nd German title
- Top goalscorer: Heinz Beck (34 goals)

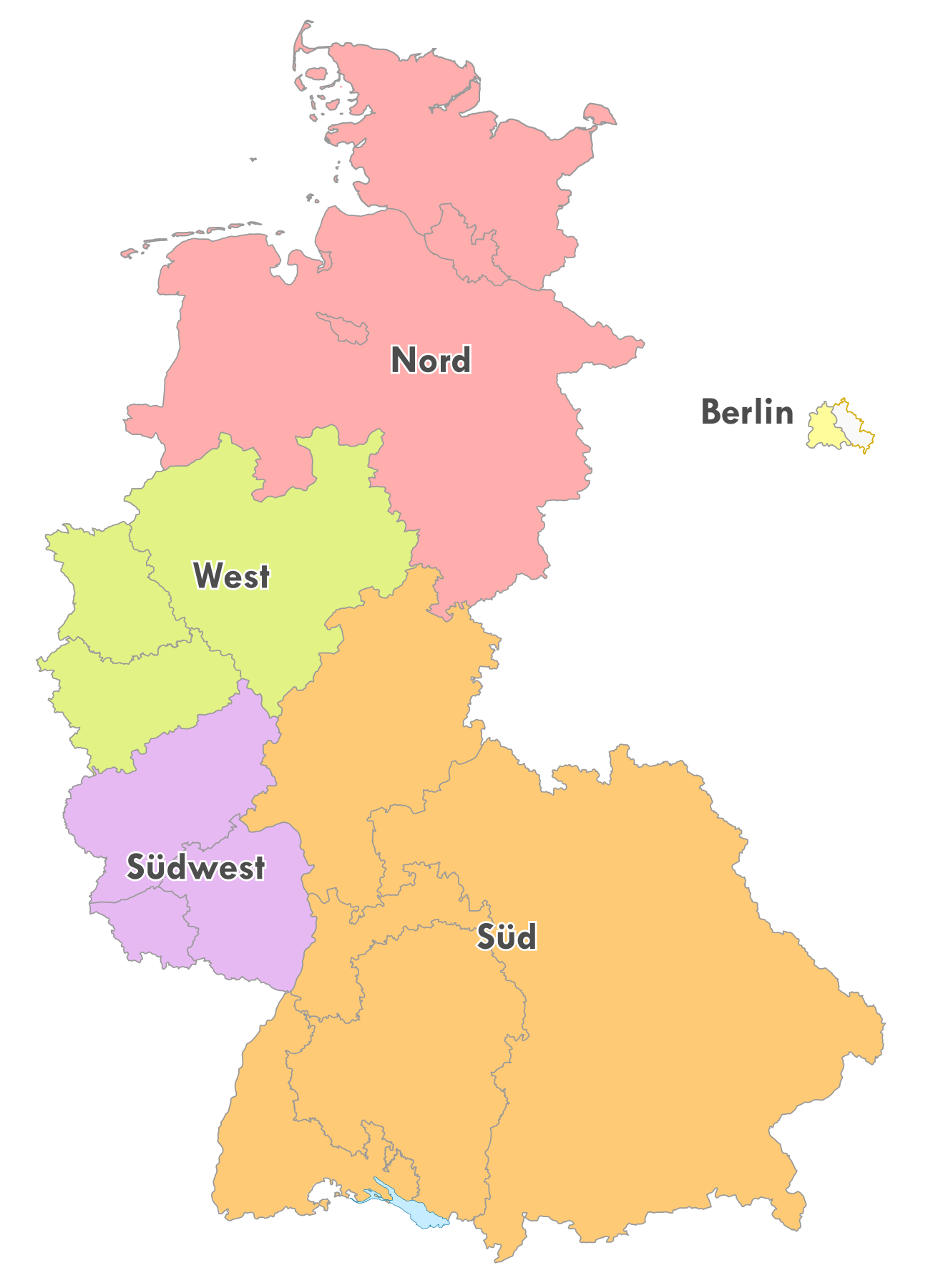
Map of the five German Oberligas 1945 to 1963

The 1956–57 Oberliga was the twelfth season of the Oberliga, the first tier of the football league system in West Germany and the Saar Protectorate. The league operated in five regional divisions, Berlin, North, South, Southwest and West. The five league champions and the runners-up from the west, south, southwest and north then entered the 1957 German football championship which was won by Borussia Dortmund. It was Borussia Dortmund's second national championship, having won its first in the previous season and thereby becoming the first club to win back-to-back championships since Dresdner SC in 1943 and 1944.

During the season, on 1 January 1957, the Saar Protectorate officially joined West Germany, ending the post-Second World War political separation of the territory from the other parts of Germany, which had also seen the Oberliga Südwest clubs from the Saarland, 1. FC Saarbrücken, Borussia Neunkirchen, Sportfreunde Saarbrücken, Saar 05 Saarbrücken and SV Röchling Völklingen, leave the German league system from 1948 to 1951.

A similar-named league, the DDR-Oberliga, existed in East Germany, set at the first tier of the East German football league system. The 1957 DDR-Oberliga was won by SC Wismut Karl-Marx-Stadt.

== Oberliga Nord ==
The 1956–57 season saw two new clubs in the league, Heider SV and Concordia Hamburg, both promoted from the Amateurliga. The league's top scorer was Uwe Seeler of Hamburger SV with 31 goals.

Pos	Team	Pld	W	D	L	GF	GA	GD	Pts	Promotion, qualification or relegation
1	Hamburger SV	30	16	9	5	86	34	+52	41	Qualification to German championship
2	Holstein Kiel	30	15	9	6	46	38	+8	39	Qualification to German championship
3	Hannover 96	30	15	7	8	58	34	+24	37	
4	FC St. Pauli	30	13	7	10	40	52	−12	33	
5	Werder Bremen	30	14	3	13	65	53	+12	31	
6	VfL Osnabrück	30	12	7	11	37	40	−3	31	
7	Eintracht Braunschweig	30	11	8	11	61	51	+10	30	
8	VfR Neumünster	30	11	8	11	35	50	−15	30	
9	TuS Bremerhaven 93	30	12	5	13	42	49	−7	29	
10	Göttingen 05	30	13	3	14	51	61	−10	29	
11	FC Altona 93	30	9	10	11	51	51	0	28	
12	Concordia Hamburg	30	11	6	13	36	38	−2	28	
13	Eintracht Nordhorn	30	8	10	12	37	48	−11	26	
14	VfL Wolfsburg	30	10	6	14	51	71	−20	26	
15	Arminia Hannover (R)	30	9	5	16	39	48	−9	23	Relegation to Amateurliga
16	Heider SV (R)	30	6	7	17	28	45	−17	19	Relegation to Amateurliga

Source: RSSSF.com
Rules for classification: 1) Points;
(R) Relegated

== Oberliga Berlin ==
The 1956–57 season saw two new clubs in the league, BFC Südring and Rapide Wedding, both promoted from the Amateurliga Berlin. The league's top scorer was Helmut Faeder of Hertha BSC Berlin with 18 goals.

Pos	Team	Pld	W	D	L	GF	GA	GD	Pts	Promotion, qualification or relegation
1	Hertha BSC Berlin	22	13	7	2	61	32	+29	33	Qualification to German championship
2	Tennis Borussia Berlin	22	14	3	5	51	31	+20	31	
3	Union 06 Berlin	22	12	3	7	46	36	+10	27	
4	Viktoria 89 Berlin	22	10	6	6	42	36	+6	26	
5	Blau-Weiß 90 Berlin	22	9	7	6	42	35	+7	25	
6	Tasmania 1900 Berlin	22	10	5	7	36	30	+6	25	
7	Spandauer SV	22	10	3	9	50	36	+14	23	
8	Berliner SV 92	22	10	3	9	42	36	+6	23	
9	Hertha Zehlendorf	22	6	5	11	32	39	−7	17	
10	Minerva 93 Berlin	22	6	5	11	29	47	−18	17	
11	BFC Südring (R)	22	2	7	13	26	49	−23	11	Relegation to Amateurliga Berlin
12	Rapide Wedding (R)	22	2	2	18	17	67	−50	6	Relegation to Amateurliga Berlin

Source: RSSSF.com
Rules for classification: 1) Points;
(R) Relegated

== Oberliga West ==
The 1956–57 season saw two new clubs in the league, VfL Bochum and Meidericher SV, both promoted from the 2. Oberliga West. The league's top scorer was Alfred Kelbassa of Borussia Dortmund with 30 goals.

Pos	Team	Pld	W	D	L	GF	GA	GD	Pts	Promotion, qualification or relegation
1	Borussia Dortmund (C)	30	17	7	6	73	33	+40	41	Qualification to German championship
2	Duisburger SV	30	16	7	7	56	39	+17	39	Qualification to German championship
3	1. FC Köln	30	14	11	5	67	50	+17	39	
4	FC Schalke 04	30	15	6	9	76	49	+27	36	
5	Alemannia Aachen	30	13	8	9	65	54	+11	34	
6	Fortuna Düsseldorf	30	15	3	12	65	53	+12	33	
7	Meidericher SV	30	11	10	9	62	42	+20	32	
8	Rot-Weiß Essen	30	12	8	10	57	51	+6	32	
9	Wuppertaler SV	30	13	4	13	41	52	−11	30	
10	VfL Bochum	30	9	11	10	54	54	0	29	
11	Westfalia Herne	30	9	9	12	33	38	−5	27	
12	Preußen Dellbrück (Note: At the end of the 1956–57 season Preußen Dellbrück merged with SC Rapid Köln to form Viktoria Köln.)	30	8	10	12	46	62	−16	26	
13	Preußen Münster	30	10	5	15	48	70	−22	25	
14	SV Sodingen	30	11	3	16	41	44	−3	25	
15	Schwarz-Weiß Essen (R)	30	8	6	16	43	63	−20	22	Relegation to 2. Oberliga West
16	Borussia München-Gladbach (R)	30	3	4	23	39	112	−73	10	Relegation to 2. Oberliga West

Source: RSSSF.com
Rules for classification: 1) Points;
(C) Champions; (R) Relegated

== Oberliga Südwest ==
The 1956–57 season saw two new clubs in the league, Sportfreunde Saarbrücken and FV Speyer, both promoted from the 2. Oberliga Südwest. The league's top scorer was Otto Hölzemann of TuS Neuendorf with 28 goals.

Pos	Team	Pld	W	D	L	GF	GA	GD	Pts	Promotion, qualification or relegation
1	1. FC Kaiserslautern	30	23	3	4	129	40	+89	49	Qualification to German championship
2	1. FC Saarbrücken	30	19	3	8	91	41	+50	41	Qualification to German championship
3	VfR Frankenthal	30	16	7	7	59	38	+21	39	
4	Phönix Ludwigshafen	30	16	2	12	60	45	+15	34	
5	Borussia Neunkirchen	30	13	7	10	52	56	−4	33	
6	TuS Neuendorf	30	12	8	10	67	60	+7	32	
7	Saar 05 Saarbrücken	30	12	6	12	61	60	+1	30	
8	FK Pirmasens	30	12	6	12	57	58	−1	30	
9	Wormatia Worms	30	11	7	12	63	47	+16	29	
10	FSV Mainz 05	30	11	6	13	38	59	−21	28	
11	Eintracht Kreuznach	30	10	7	13	44	54	−10	27	
12	Eintracht Trier	30	10	6	14	41	56	−15	26	
13	VfR Kaiserslautern	30	7	11	12	37	51	−14	25	
14	FV Speyer	30	10	3	17	54	69	−15	23	
15	SpVgg Andernach (R)	30	7	4	19	42	98	−56	18	Relegation to 2. Oberliga Südwest
16	Sportfreunde Saarbrücken (R)	30	6	4	20	44	107	−63	16	Relegation to 2. Oberliga Südwest

Source: RSSSF.com
Rules for classification: 1) Points;
(R) Relegated

== Oberliga Süd ==
The 1956–57 season saw two new clubs in the league, Freiburger FC and FC Bayern Munich, both promoted from the 2. Oberliga Süd. The league's top scorer was Heinz Beck of Karlsruher SC with 34 goals, the highest total for any scorer in the five Oberligas in 1956–57.

Pos	Team	Pld	W	D	L	GF	GA	GD	Pts	Promotion, qualification or relegation
1	1. FC Nürnberg	30	21	5	4	76	33	+43	47	Qualification to German championship
2	Kickers Offenbach	30	17	9	4	81	35	+46	43	Qualification to German championship
3	Karlsruher SC	30	18	5	7	74	41	+33	41	
4	VfB Stuttgart	30	17	5	8	69	44	+25	39	
5	Eintracht Frankfurt	30	15	5	10	60	42	+18	35	
6	SpVgg Fürth	30	12	5	13	61	57	+4	29	
7	VfR Mannheim	30	12	5	13	51	54	−3	29	
8	Viktoria Aschaffenburg	30	11	5	14	44	54	−10	27	
9	Jahn Regensburg	30	11	5	14	46	73	−27	27	
10	FC Bayern Munich	30	12	2	16	52	62	−10	26	
11	FSV Frankfurt	30	9	8	13	41	60	−19	26	
12	FC Schweinfurt 05	30	9	6	15	41	68	−27	24	
13	BC Augsburg	30	8	7	15	49	66	−17	23	
14	Stuttgarter Kickers	30	9	4	17	46	50	−4	22	
15	Schwaben Augsburg (R)	30	9	4	17	35	64	−29	22	Relegation to 2. Oberliga Süd
16	Freiburger FC (R)	30	6	8	16	43	66	−23	20	Relegation to 2. Oberliga Süd

Source: RSSSF.com
Rules for classification: 1) Points;
(R) Relegated

== German championship ==
The 1957 German football championship was contested by the nine qualified Oberliga teams and won by Borussia Dortmund, defeating Hamburger SV in the final. The runners-up of the Oberliga Nord and Süd played a pre-qualifying match. The remaining eight clubs then played a single round of matches at neutral grounds in two groups of four. The two group winners then advanced to the final.

=== Qualifying ===
Team 1	Score	Team 2
Kickers Offenbach	3–2 aet	Holstein Kiel

=== Group 1 ===
Pos	Team	Pld	W	D	L	GF	GA	GD	Pts	Promotion, qualification or relegation
1	Hamburger SV (Q)	3	2	1	0	5	3	+2	5	Qualified to final
2	Duisburger SV	3	1	2	0	6	4	+2	4	
3	1. FC Nürnberg	3	0	2	1	5	6	−1	2	
4	1. FC Saarbrücken	3	0	1	2	4	7	−3	1	

Source: RSSSF.com
Rules for classification: 1) Points;
(Q) Qualified for the phase indicated

=== Group 2 ===
Pos	Team	Pld	W	D	L	GF	GA	GD	Pts	Promotion, qualification or relegation
1	Borussia Dortmund (Q)	3	3	0	0	7	4	+3	6	Qualified to final
2	Kickers Offenbach	3	2	0	1	8	4	+4	4	
3	1. FC Kaiserslautern	3	1	0	2	17	8	+9	2	
4	Hertha BSC Berlin	3	0	0	3	3	19	−16	0	

Source: RSSSF.com
Rules for classification: 1) Points;
(Q) Qualified for the phase indicated

=== Final ===
Team 1	Score	Team 2
Borussia Dortmund	4–1	Hamburger SV
