= 1955–56 Oberliga =

Oberliga
- Season: 1955–56
- Champions: Hamburger SV Viktoria 89 Berlin Borussia Dortmund: 1. FC Kaiserslautern; Karlsruher SC
- Relegated: VfB Oldenburg Eimsbütteler TV Alemannia 90 Berlin Wacker 04 Berlin Bayer Leverkusen Sportfreunde Hamborn FV Engers TuRa Ludwigshafen SSV Reutlingen TSV 1860 München
- German champions: Borussia Dortmund; 1st German title
- Top goalscorer: Uwe Seeler (32 goals)

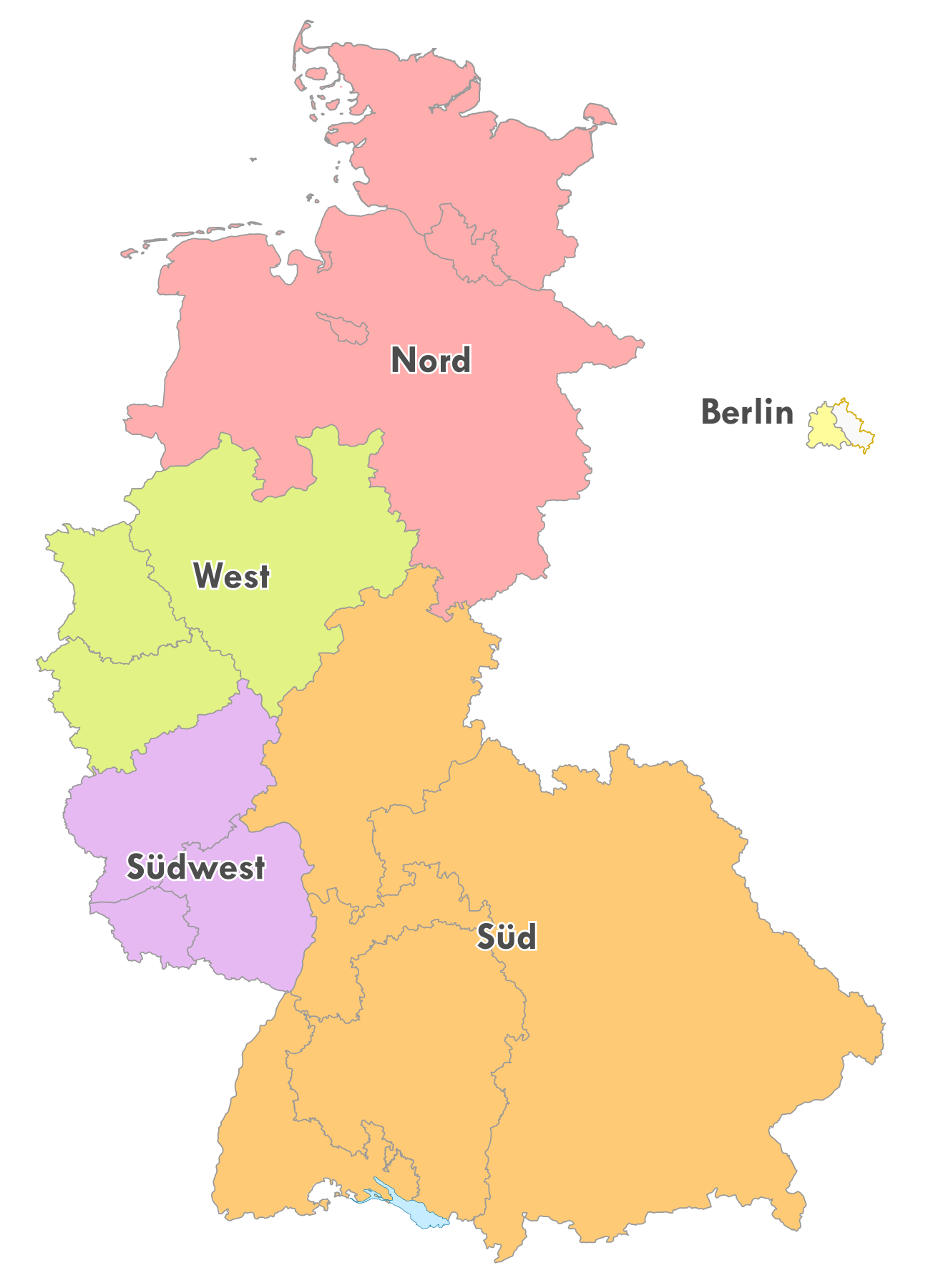
Map of the five German Oberligas 1945 to 1963

The 1955–56 Oberliga was the eleventh season of the Oberliga, the first tier of the football league system in West Germany and the Saar Protectorate. The league operated in five regional divisions, Berlin, North, South, Southwest and West. The five league champions and the runners-up from the west, south, southwest and north then entered the 1956 German football championship which was won by Borussia Dortmund. It was Borussia Dortmund's first-ever national championship and second appearance in the championship final, having previously lost to VfR Mannheim in 1949.

A similar-named league, the DDR-Oberliga, existed in East Germany, set at the first tier of the East German football league system. The 1956 DDR-Oberliga was won by SC Wismut Karl-Marx-Stadt.

== Oberliga Nord ==
The 1955–56 season saw two new clubs in the league, VfR Neumünster and Eintracht Nordhorn, both promoted from the Amateurliga. The league's top scorer was Uwe Seeler of Hamburger SV with 32 goals, the highest total for any scorer in the five Oberligas in 1955–56.

Pos	Team	Pld	W	D	L	GF	GA	GD	Pts	Promotion, qualification or relegation
1	Hamburger SV	30	17	7	6	89	35	+54	41	Qualification to German championship
2	Hannover 96	30	16	6	8	57	39	+18	38	Qualification to German championship
3	Arminia Hannover	30	13	11	6	46	39	+7	37	
4	Holstein Kiel	30	13	9	8	51	37	+14	35	
5	VfR Neumünster	30	13	7	10	49	45	+4	33	
6	Werder Bremen	30	14	4	12	74	54	+20	32	
7	TuS Bremerhaven 93	30	11	10	9	55	49	+6	32	
8	Göttingen 05	30	14	3	13	58	59	−1	31	
9	FC Altona 93	30	11	7	12	43	52	−9	29	
10	VfL Osnabrück	30	11	6	13	48	64	−16	28	
11	Eintracht Braunschweig	30	12	3	15	68	71	−3	27	
12	Eintracht Nordhorn	30	8	11	11	46	60	−14	27	
13	FC St. Pauli	30	9	9	12	36	47	−11	27	
14	VfL Wolfsburg	30	8	9	13	55	62	−7	25	
15	VfB Oldenburg (R)	30	6	9	15	37	60	−23	21	Relegation to Amateurliga
16	Eimsbütteler TV (R)	30	4	9	17	43	82	−39	17	Relegation to Amateurliga

Source: RSSSF.com
Rules for classification: 1) Points;
(R) Relegated

== Oberliga Berlin ==
The 1955–56 season saw two new clubs in the league, Tasmania 1900 Berlin and Hertha Zehlendorf, both promoted from the Amateurliga Berlin. The league's top scorer was Manfred Dommasch of Hertha Zehlendorf with 18 goals.

Pos	Team	Pld	W	D	L	GF	GA	GD	Pts	Promotion, qualification or relegation
1	Viktoria 89 Berlin	22	13	3	6	60	28	+32	29	Qualification to German championship
2	Minerva 93 Berlin	22	10	7	5	46	42	+4	27	
3	Berliner SV 92	22	8	9	5	37	36	+1	25	
4	Spandauer SV	22	11	2	9	44	33	+11	24	
5	Blau-Weiß 90 Berlin	22	7	10	5	28	29	−1	24	
6	Union 06 Berlin	22	9	5	8	44	39	+5	23	
7	Tennis Borussia Berlin	22	10	2	10	40	37	+3	22	
8	Hertha Zehlendorf	22	8	5	9	39	37	+2	21	
9	Tasmania 1900 Berlin	22	6	9	7	21	25	−4	21	
10	Hertha BSC Berlin	22	7	4	11	40	48	−8	18	
11	Alemannia 90 Berlin (R)	22	7	4	11	30	52	−22	18	Relegation to Amateurliga Berlin
12	Wacker 04 Berlin (R)	22	4	4	14	27	50	−23	12	Relegation to Amateurliga Berlin

Source: RSSSF.com
Rules for classification: 1) Points;
(R) Relegated

== Oberliga West ==
The 1955–56 season saw two new clubs in the league, Sportfreunde Hamborn and Wuppertaler SV, both promoted from the 2. Oberliga West. The league's top scorer was Alfred Niepieklo of Borussia Dortmund with 24 goals.

Pos	Team	Pld	W	D	L	GF	GA	GD	Pts	Promotion, qualification or relegation
1	Borussia Dortmund (C)	30	20	5	5	78	36	+42	45	Qualification to German championship
2	FC Schalke 04	30	18	5	7	67	38	+29	41	Qualification to German championship
3	Alemannia Aachen	30	17	7	6	70	55	+15	41	
4	Duisburger SV	30	13	10	7	48	36	+12	36	
5	Rot-Weiß Essen	30	15	6	9	59	45	+14	36	
6	Fortuna Düsseldorf	30	14	8	8	55	48	+7	36	
7	1. FC Köln	30	13	6	11	59	48	+11	32	
8	Schwarz-Weiß Essen	30	9	9	12	44	45	−1	27	
9	SV Sodingen	30	10	7	13	44	49	−5	27	
10	Wuppertaler SV	30	12	3	15	43	62	−19	27	
11	Borussia München-Gladbach	30	10	6	14	60	70	−10	26	
12	Preußen Münster	30	11	4	15	51	64	−13	26	
13	Westfalia Herne	30	7	10	13	51	60	−9	24	
14	Preußen Dellbrück	30	9	6	15	49	69	−20	24	
15	Bayer Leverkusen (R)	30	7	3	20	37	65	−28	17	Relegation to 2. Oberliga West
16	Sportfreunde Hamborn (R)	30	6	3	21	45	70	−25	15	Relegation to 2. Oberliga West

Source: RSSSF.com
Rules for classification: 1) Points;
(C) Champions; (R) Relegated

== Oberliga Südwest ==
The 1955–56 season saw two new clubs in the league, FV Speyer and Sportfreunde Saarbrücken, both promoted from the 2. Oberliga Südwest. The league's top scorer was Horst Schmutzler of TuS Neuendorf with 30 goals.

Pos	Team	Pld	W	D	L	GF	GA	GD	Pts	Promotion, qualification or relegation
1	1. FC Kaiserslautern	30	25	3	2	108	41	+67	53	Qualification to German championship
2	TuS Neuendorf	30	20	3	7	75	36	+39	43	Qualification to German championship
3	1. FC Saarbrücken	30	17	5	8	88	53	+35	39	
4	FK Pirmasens	30	15	7	8	65	42	+23	37	
5	VfR Frankenthal	30	14	6	10	47	37	+10	34	
6	Borussia Neunkirchen	30	14	6	10	57	47	+10	34	
7	Phönix Ludwigshafen	30	15	4	11	49	43	+6	34	
8	Eintracht Kreuznach	30	14	4	12	59	75	−16	32	
9	Saar 05 Saarbrücken	30	13	2	15	62	55	+7	28	
10	FSV Mainz 05	30	11	5	14	52	64	−12	27	
11	Wormatia Worms	30	9	8	13	65	66	−1	26	
12	Eintracht Trier	30	9	7	14	47	57	−10	25	
13	VfR Kaiserslautern	30	9	2	19	47	76	−29	20	
14	SpVgg Andernach	30	7	5	18	43	87	−44	19	
15	FV Engers (R)	30	6	3	21	52	99	−47	15	Relegation to 2. Oberliga Südwest
16	TuRa Ludwigshafen (R)	30	5	4	21	31	68	−37	14	Relegation to 2. Oberliga Südwest

Source: RSSSF.com
Rules for classification: 1) Points;
(R) Relegated

== Oberliga Süd ==
The 1955–56 season saw two new clubs in the league, TSV 1860 München and Viktoria Aschaffenburg, both promoted from the 2. Oberliga Süd. The league's top scorer was Ernst-Otto Meyer of VfR Mannheim with 30 goals, six less than the previous season when he also finished as the league's top scorer.

Pos	Team	Pld	W	D	L	GF	GA	GD	Pts	Promotion, qualification or relegation
1	Karlsruher SC	30	17	7	6	63	38	+25	41	Qualification to German championship
2	VfB Stuttgart	30	14	10	6	52	29	+23	38	Qualification to German championship
3	VfR Mannheim	30	17	2	11	73	45	+28	36	
4	Kickers Offenbach	30	16	4	10	66	51	+15	36	
5	Viktoria Aschaffenburg	30	13	9	8	61	45	+16	35	
6	Eintracht Frankfurt	30	13	5	12	56	49	+7	31	
7	1. FC Nürnberg	30	12	7	11	42	41	+1	31	
8	FC Schweinfurt 05	30	13	4	13	53	53	0	30	
9	FSV Frankfurt	30	13	3	14	51	43	+8	29	
10	Jahn Regensburg	30	11	6	13	41	51	−10	28	
11	BC Augsburg	30	9	8	13	48	53	−5	26	
12	Schwaben Augsburg	30	10	6	14	43	57	−14	26	
13	SpVgg Fürth	30	11	4	15	48	69	−21	26	
14	Stuttgarter Kickers	30	11	2	17	33	43	−10	24	
15	SSV Reutlingen (R)	30	10	4	16	49	81	−32	24	Relegation to 2. Oberliga Süd
16	TSV 1860 München (R)	30	8	3	19	43	74	−31	19	Relegation to 2. Oberliga Süd

Source: RSSSF.com
Rules for classification: 1) Points;
(R) Relegated

== German championship ==
The 1956 German football championship was contested by the nine qualified Oberliga teams and won by Borussia Dortmund, defeating Karlsruher SC in the final. The runners-up of the Oberligas, except Berlin, played pre-qualifying matches to determine which three of the four would go on to the group stage. The remaining eight clubs then played a home-and-away round of matches in two groups of four. The two group winners then advanced to the final.

=== Qualifying ===
==== First round ====
Team 1	Score	Team 2
FC Schalke 04	2–1 aet	Hannover 96

Team 1	Score	Team 2
VfB Stuttgart	8–0	TuS Neuendorf

==== Second round ====
Team 1	Score	Team 2
Hannover 96	3–3 aet	TuS Neuendorf

Replay

Team 1	Score	Team 2
Hannover 96	3–2	TuS Neuendorf

=== Group 1 ===
Pos	Team	Pld	W	D	L	GF	GA	GD	Pts	Promotion, qualification or relegation	KSC	S04	FCK	H96
1	Karlsruher SC (Q)	6	3	1	2	7	5	+2	7	Qualified to final	—	3–2	0–1	0–0
2	FC Schalke 04	6	3	1	2	16	12	+4	7		0–3	—	3–1	3–1
3	1. FC Kaiserslautern	6	3	1	2	16	13	+3	7		0–1	4–4	—	5–3
4	Hannover 96	6	1	1	4	8	17	−9	3		2–0	0–4	2–5	—

Source: RSSSF.com
Rules for classification: 1) Points;
(Q) Qualified for the phase indicated

=== Group 2 ===
Pos	Team	Pld	W	D	L	GF	GA	GD	Pts	Promotion, qualification or relegation	DOR	HSV	VFB	VIC
1	Borussia Dortmund (Q)	6	4	1	1	19	4	+15	9	Qualified to final	—	5–0	4–1	1–1
2	Hamburger SV	6	4	1	1	14	10	+4	9		2–1	—	0–0	5–1
3	VfB Stuttgart	6	1	2	3	9	14	−5	4		0–2	2–4	—	3–1
4	Viktoria 89 Berlin	6	0	2	4	7	21	−14	2		0–6	1–3	3–3	—

Source: RSSSF.com
Rules for classification: 1) Points;
(Q) Qualified for the phase indicated

=== Final ===
Team 1	Score	Team 2
Borussia Dortmund	4–2	Karlsruher SC
