= 1950–51 Oberliga =

Oberliga
- Season: 1950–51
- Champions: Hamburger SV Tennis Borussia Berlin FC Schalke 04: 1. FC Kaiserslautern; 1. FC Nürnberg
- Relegated: FC Altona 93 VfB Oldenburg Itzehoer SV VfB Britz BFC Südring Rot-Weiß Oberhausen Borussia München-Gladbach Duisburger SV ASV Landau SpVgg Andernach FC Singen 04 SSV Reutlingen
- German champions: 1. FC Kaiserslautern; 1st German title
- Top goalscorer: Herbert Wojtkowiak (40 goals)

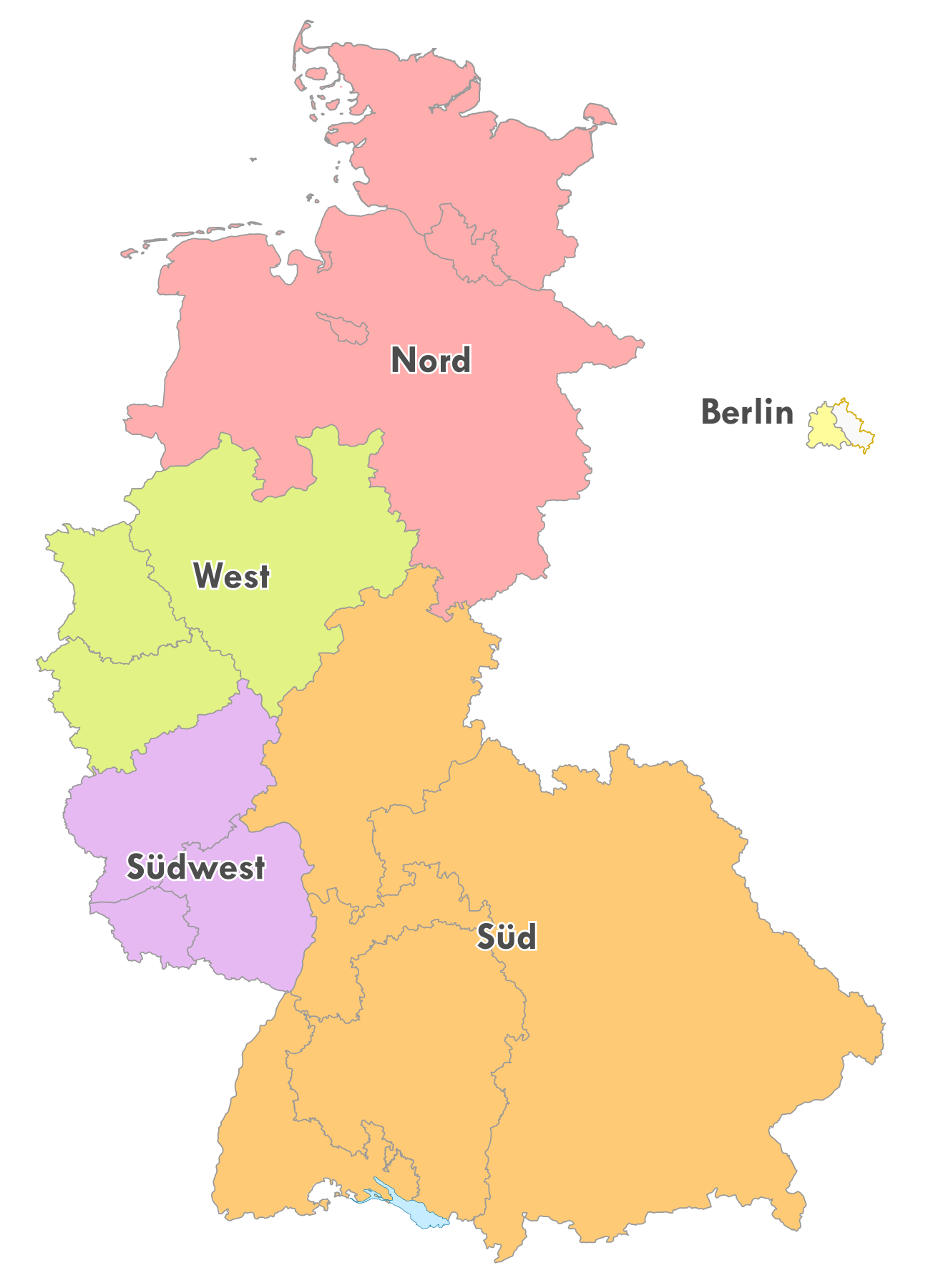
Map of the five German Oberligas 1945 to 1963

The 1950–51 Oberliga was the sixth season of the Oberliga, the first tier of the football league system in West Germany. The league operated in five regional divisions, Berlin, North, South, Southwest and West. The five league champions and the runners-up from the south, north and west then entered the 1951 German football championship which was won by 1. FC Kaiserslautern. It was 1. FC Kaiserslautern's first-ever national championship.

The 1950–51 season was the first without clubs from East Berlin in the Oberliga, with VfB Pankow and Union Oberschöneweide having left the league, the latter to be replaced by the West Berlin club Union 06 Berlin, formed by former Oberschöneweide players who had moved to the West. It was also the last without the clubs from the Saar Protectorate, which had left the West German league system in 1948, but returned in 1951–52, with 1. FC Saarbrücken and Borussia Neunkirchen rejoining the Oberliga Südwest. Eventually, on 1 January 1957, the Saar Protectorate would officially join West Germany, ending the post-Second World War political separation of the territory from the other parts of Germany.

A similar-named league, the DDR-Oberliga, existed in East Germany, set at the first tier of the East German football league system. The 1950–51 DDR-Oberliga was won by BSG Chemie Leipzig.

== Oberliga Nord ==
The 1950–51 season saw three new clubs in the league, FC Altona 93, Itzehoer SV and Eintracht Osnabrück, all promoted from the Amateurliga. The league's top scorer was Herbert Wojtkowiak of Hamburger SV with 40 goals, the highest total for the five Oberligas in 1950–51 and throughout the 16-year history of the Oberliga Nord.

Pos	Team	Pld	W	D	L	GF	GA	GD	Pts	Promotion, qualification or relegation
1	Hamburger SV	32	22	5	5	113	54	+59	49	Qualification to German championship
2	FC St. Pauli	32	18	10	4	84	41	+43	46	Qualification to German championship
3	Holstein Kiel	32	17	6	9	63	59	+4	40	
4	VfL Osnabrück	32	16	7	9	84	54	+30	39	
5	Eimsbütteler TV	32	14	9	9	51	47	+4	37	
6	Werder Bremen	32	15	6	11	79	59	+20	36	
7	Bremer SV	32	12	10	10	57	56	+1	34	
8	TuS Bremerhaven 93	32	13	6	13	66	61	+5	32	
9	Göttingen 05	32	11	9	12	66	75	−9	31	
10	Eintracht Braunschweig	32	9	12	11	60	55	+5	30	
11	Hannover 96	32	11	7	14	60	66	−6	29	
12	Concordia Hamburg	32	9	10	13	49	65	−16	28	
13	Arminia Hannover	32	11	5	16	63	69	−6	27	
14	Eintracht Osnabrück	32	8	10	14	57	75	−18	26	
15	FC Altona 93 (R)	32	8	10	14	55	79	−24	26	Relegation to Amateurliga
16	VfB Oldenburg (R)	32	8	9	15	53	69	−16	25	Relegation to Amateurliga
17	Itzehoer SV (R)	32	3	3	26	42	118	−76	9	Relegation to Amateurliga

Source: RSSSF.com
Rules for classification: 1) Points;
(R) Relegated

== Oberliga Berlin ==
The 1950–51 season saw four new clubs in the league, Union 06 Berlin, Minerva 93 Berlin, SC Westend 01 and Blau-Weiß 90 Berlin, all promoted from the Amateurliga Berlin. The league's top scorer was Paul Salisch of SC Union 06 Berlin with 29 goals.

Pos	Team	Pld	W	D	L	GF	GA	GD	Pts	Promotion, qualification or relegation
1	Tennis Borussia Berlin	26	19	6	1	84	23	+61	44	Qualification to German championship
2	Union 06 Berlin	26	17	5	4	63	23	+40	39	
3	Hertha BSC Berlin	26	13	6	7	63	32	+31	32	
4	Berliner SV 92	26	11	6	9	54	46	+8	28	
5	Alemannia 90 Berlin	26	10	7	9	43	45	−2	27	
6	Spandauer SV	26	12	3	11	43	51	−8	27	
7	Viktoria 89 Berlin	26	9	8	9	53	53	0	26	
8	Tasmania 1900 Berlin	26	7	10	9	46	47	−1	24	
9	Minerva 93 Berlin	26	8	8	10	32	56	−24	24	
10	SC Westend 01	26	7	7	12	34	48	−14	21	
11	Wacker 04 Berlin	26	5	10	11	34	50	−16	20	
12	Blau-Weiß 90 Berlin	26	5	10	11	26	45	−19	20	
13	VfB Britz (R)	26	7	2	17	31	56	−25	16	Relegation to Amateurliga Berlin
14	BFC Südring (R)	26	5	6	15	37	70	−33	16	Relegation to Amateurliga Berlin

Source: RSSSF.com
Rules for classification: 1) Points;
(R) Relegated

== Oberliga West ==
The 1950–51 season saw four new clubs in the league, Fortuna Düsseldorf, Sportfreunde Katernberg, Rheydter SV and Borussia München-Gladbach, all promoted from the 2. Oberliga West. The league's top scorer was Hans Kleina of FC Schalke 04 with 25 goals.

Pos	Team	Pld	W	D	L	GF	GA	GD	Pts	Promotion, qualification or relegation
1	FC Schalke 04	30	18	6	6	69	36	+33	42	Qualification to German championship
2	Preußen Münster	30	19	3	8	58	36	+22	41	Qualification to German championship
3	Borussia Dortmund	30	14	11	5	52	36	+16	39	
4	1. FC Köln	30	17	4	9	60	31	+29	38	
5	Fortuna Düsseldorf	30	13	5	12	49	35	+14	31	
6	Rot-Weiss Essen	30	13	4	13	59	53	+6	30	
7	Sportfreunde Hamborn	30	10	10	10	42	45	−3	30	
8	Preußen Dellbrück	30	10	8	12	49	52	−3	28	
9	Rheydter SV	30	11	6	13	47	57	−10	28	
10	STV Horst-Emscher	30	11	5	14	47	51	−4	27	
11	SpVgg Erkenschwick	30	7	13	10	34	39	−5	27	
12	Sportfreunde Katernberg	30	10	6	14	55	64	−9	26	
13	Rot-Weiß Oberhausen (R)	30	9	8	13	31	50	−19	26	Relegation to 2. Oberliga West
14	Borussia München-Gladbach (R)	30	9	7	14	47	72	−25	25	Relegation to 2. Oberliga West
15	Alemannia Aachen (Note: Alemannia Aachen was not relegated because Borussia München-Gladbach had two points awarded during the season which were however not counted in the table for the purpose of relegation. The two clubs had to play a decider which Aachen won 5–1. Aachen thereby qualified for the play-offs with the 2. Oberliga runners-up, where it succeeded while Rot-Weiß Oberhausen failed and was relegated.)	30	8	8	14	56	66	−10	24	
16	Duisburger SV (R)	30	6	6	18	27	59	−32	18	Relegation to 2. Oberliga West

Source: RSSSF.com
Rules for classification: 1) Points;
(R) Relegated

== Oberliga Südwest ==
The 1950–51 season saw two new clubs in the league, TuRa Ludwigshafen and Eintracht Kreuznach, both promoted from the Amateurliga. The league's top scorer was Ottmar Walter of 1. FC Kaiserslautern with 29 goals.

Pos	Team	Pld	W	D	L	GF	GA	GD	Pts	Promotion, qualification or relegation
1	1. FC Kaiserslautern (C)	26	22	2	2	95	16	+79	46	Qualification to German championship
2	Wormatia Worms	26	18	3	5	70	30	+40	39	
3	FK Pirmasens	26	17	3	6	68	39	+29	37	
4	Phönix Ludwigshafen	26	15	4	7	80	51	+29	34	
5	TuS Neuendorf	26	14	6	6	61	41	+20	34	
6	Eintracht Trier	26	14	3	9	51	43	+8	31	
7	FV Engers	26	13	2	11	50	46	+4	28	
8	VfL Neustadt	26	11	4	11	38	49	−11	26	
9	VfR Kaiserslautern	26	8	5	13	40	62	−22	21	
10	TuRa Ludwigshafen	26	7	2	17	30	59	−29	16	
11	Eintracht Kreuznach	26	4	6	16	33	58	−25	14	
12	FSV Mainz 05	26	5	4	17	33	75	−42	14	
13	ASV Landau (R)	26	6	1	19	28	81	−53	13	Relegation to 2. Oberliga Südwest
14	SpVgg Andernach (R)	26	5	1	20	35	62	−27	11	Relegation to 2. Oberliga Südwest

Source: RSSSF.com
Rules for classification: 1) Points;
(C) Champions; (R) Relegated

== Oberliga Süd ==
The 1950–51 season saw four new clubs in the league, VfL Neckarau and SV Darmstadt 98, both promoted from the Landesligas, while SSV Reutlingen and FC Singen 04 moved across from the southern division of the Oberliga Südwest. The league's top scorer was Max Morlock of 1. FC Nürnberg with 28 goals.

Pos	Team	Pld	W	D	L	GF	GA	GD	Pts	Promotion, qualification or relegation
1	1. FC Nürnberg	34	20	7	7	93	46	+47	47	Qualification to German championship
2	SpVgg Fürth	34	19	7	8	86	43	+43	45	Qualification to German championship
3	VfB Mühlburg	34	20	4	10	94	55	+39	44	
4	VfB Stuttgart	34	19	5	10	82	55	+27	43	
5	FSV Frankfurt	34	18	7	9	71	52	+19	43	
6	TSV 1860 München	34	19	4	11	97	67	+30	42	
7	FC Schweinfurt 05	34	16	4	14	69	57	+12	36	
8	Eintracht Frankfurt	34	12	10	12	56	64	−8	34	
9	FC Bayern Munich	34	14	5	15	64	53	+11	33	
10	Kickers Offenbach	34	14	4	16	69	64	+5	32	
11	VfL Neckarau	34	14	4	16	74	94	−20	32	
12	VfR Mannheim	34	14	3	17	72	72	0	31	
13	Schwaben Augsburg	34	10	9	15	46	67	−21	29	
14	SV Waldhof Mannheim	34	10	8	16	54	67	−13	28	
15	SV Darmstadt 98 (R)	34	9	7	18	54	86	−32	25	Relegation to 2. Oberliga Süd
16	BC Augsburg (R)	34	10	4	20	59	82	−23	24	Relegation to 2. Oberliga Süd
17	FC Singen 04 (R)	34	9	4	21	56	112	−56	22	Relegation to 2. Oberliga Süd
18	SSV Reutlingen (R)	34	8	6	20	49	109	−60	22	Relegation to 2. Oberliga Süd

Source: RSSSF.com
Rules for classification: 1) Points;
(R) Relegated

== German championship ==
The 1951 German football championship was contested by the eight qualified Oberliga teams and won by 1. FC Kaiserslautern, defeating Preußen Münster in the final. The eight clubs played a home-and-away round of matches in two groups of four. The two group winners then advanced to the final.

=== Group 1 ===
Pos	Team	Pld	W	D	L	GF	GA	GD	Pts	Promotion, qualification or relegation
1	1. FC Kaiserslautern (Q)	6	4	1	1	14	8	+6	9	Qualified for final
2	FC Schalke 04	6	3	1	2	7	6	+1	7	
3	SpVgg Fürth	6	1	2	3	8	9	−1	4	
4	FC St. Pauli	6	2	0	4	6	12	−6	4	

Source: RSSSF.com
Rules for classification: 1) Points;
(Q) Qualified for the phase indicated

=== Group 2 ===
Pos	Team	Pld	W	D	L	GF	GA	GD	Pts	Promotion, qualification or relegation
1	Preußen Münster (Q)	6	4	0	2	22	16	+6	8	Qualified for final
2	1. FC Nürnberg	6	4	0	2	17	13	+4	8	
3	Hamburger SV	6	3	0	3	12	12	0	6	
4	Tennis Borussia Berlin	6	1	0	5	10	20	−10	2	

Source: RSSSF.com
Rules for classification: 1) Points;
(Q) Qualified for the phase indicated

=== Final ===
Team 1	Score	Team 2
1. FC Kaiserslautern	2–1	Preußen Münster
