= Horst Schnoor =

German footballer (1934–2026)

Personal information
- Full name: Horst Schnoor
- Date of birth: 11 April 1934
- Place of birth: Hamburg, Germany
- Date of death: 25 February 2026 (aged 91)
- Height: 1.83 m (6 ft 0 in)
- Position: Goalkeeper

Youth career
- 1952: Langenhorner TSV

Senior career*
Years	Team	Apps	(Gls)
1952–1969	Hamburger SV	399	(0)

International career
	West Germany B	2	(0)
- * Club domestic league appearances and goals

Horst Schnoor (11 April 1934 – 25 February 2026) was a German football goalkeeper who played for Hamburger SV. He won the German football championship with the club in 1960 and the DFB-Pokal in 1963. He was credited with a club record of 139 matches without conceding a goal.

== Early life and education ==
Schnoor was born in Hamburg and was associated with the city throughout his long first team career with Hamburger SV.

== Career ==
Schnoor was Hamburger SV's first choice goalkeeper for much of the period from 1952 to 1967, making 507 competitive appearances for the club. He was part of the team that won the German football championship in 1960 and the DFB-Pokal in 1963, after winning multiple Oberliga Nord titles before the creation of the Bundesliga. He played for Hamburger SV in the early Bundesliga era from 1963. He set an appearance record for Hamburger SV until surpassed by team mate Uwe Seeler and later Manfred Kaltz. He gained wider attention through UEFA European Cup appearances in 1960 and 1961. He made two appearances for the West Germany B team.

== Death ==
Schnoor died on 25 February 2026, at the age of 91.
