= 1960–61 Oberliga =

Oberliga
- Season: 1960–61
- Champions: Hamburger SV Hertha BSC Berlin: 1. FC Köln; 1. FC Saarbrücken; 1. FC Nürnberg
- Relegated: VfB Lübeck Heider SV Kickers 1900 Berlin Rot-Weiß Essen VfL Bochum VfR Frankenthal SV Niederlahnstein TSG Ulm 1846 Jahn Regensburg
- German champions: 1. FC Nürnberg; 8th German title
- Top goalscorer: Uwe Seeler (29 goals)

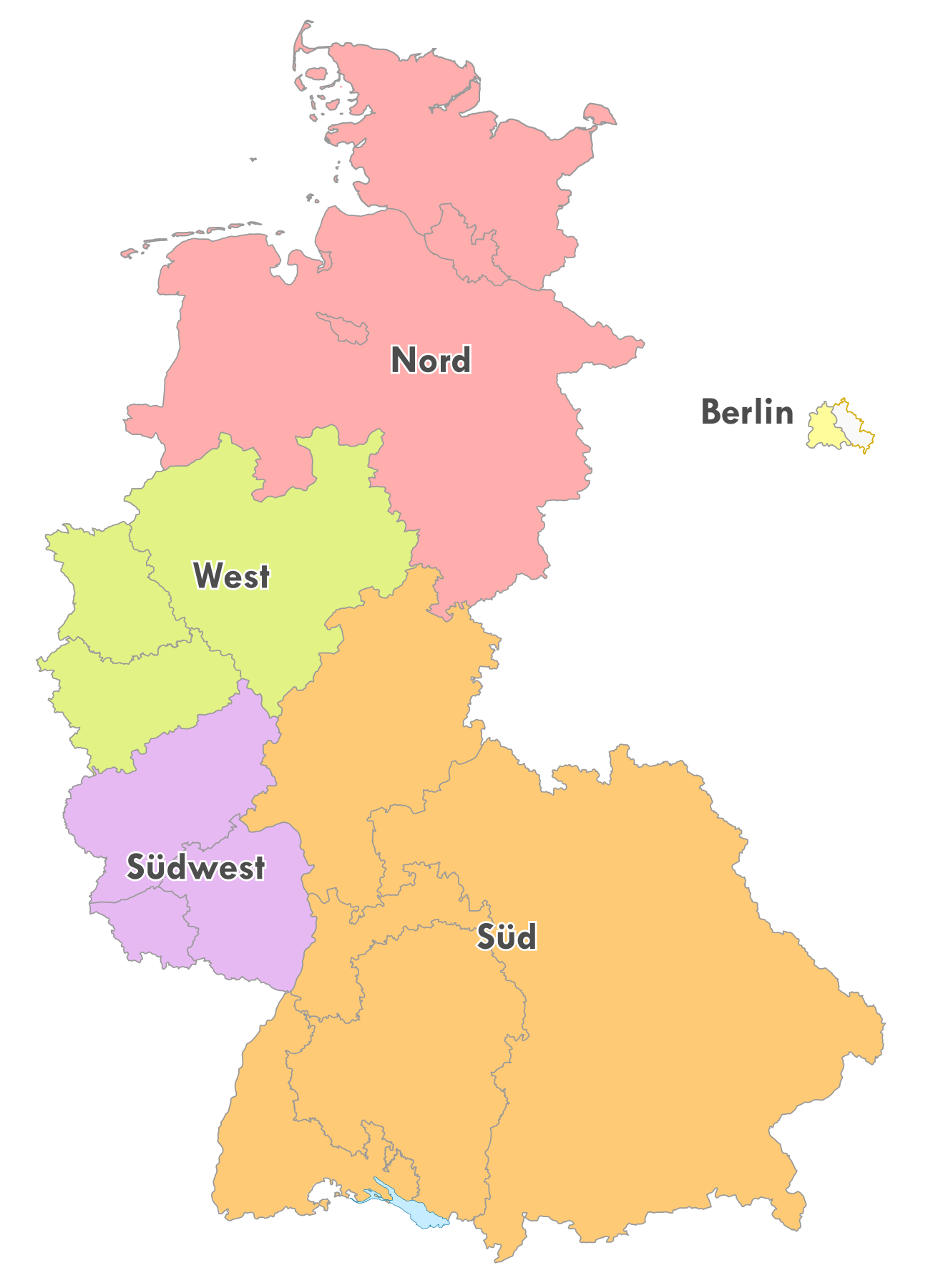
Map of the five German Oberligas 1945 to 1963

The 1960–61 Oberliga was the sixteenth season of the Oberliga, the first tier of the football league system in West Germany. The league operated in five regional divisions, Berlin, North, South, Southwest and West. The five league champions and the runners-up from the west, south, southwest and north then entered the 1961 German football championship which was won by 1. FC Nürnberg. It was 1. FC Nürnberg's eighth national championship and its first since 1948.

A similar-named league, the DDR-Oberliga, existed in East Germany, set at the first tier of the East German football league system. The 1960 DDR-Oberliga was won by ASK Vorwärts Berlin, after which the league reverted to the traditional autumn-spring format and held its next season in 1961–62.

== Oberliga Nord ==
The 1960–61 season saw two new clubs in the league, VfB Oldenburg and Heider SV, both promoted from the Amateurliga. The league's top scorer was Uwe Seeler of Hamburger SV with 29 goals, the highest total for any scorer in the five Oberligas in 1960–61.

Pos	Team	Pld	W	D	L	GF	GA	GD	Pts	Promotion, qualification or relegation
1	Hamburger SV	30	24	2	4	101	29	+72	50	Qualification to German championship
2	Werder Bremen	30	19	5	6	73	47	+26	43	Qualification to German championship
3	VfL Osnabrück	30	17	5	8	67	43	+24	39	
4	FC St. Pauli	30	16	4	10	60	46	+14	36	
5	Hannover 96	30	15	5	10	64	43	+21	35	
6	FC Altona 93	30	13	4	13	39	53	−14	30	
7	Holstein Kiel	30	12	5	13	49	49	0	29	
8	VfV Hildesheim	30	12	4	14	48	52	−4	28	
9	Eintracht Braunschweig	30	10	8	12	51	56	−5	28	
10	VfB Oldenburg	30	7	12	11	45	55	−10	26	
11	VfR Neumünster	30	7	12	11	44	56	−12	26	
12	Concordia Hamburg	30	8	8	14	44	69	−25	24	
13	ASV Bergedorf 85	30	8	7	15	37	57	−20	23	
14	TuS Bremerhaven 93	30	9	5	16	37	67	−30	23	
15	VfB Lübeck (R)	30	7	8	15	38	50	−12	22	Relegation to Amateurliga
16	Heider SV (R)	30	7	4	19	38	73	−35	18	Relegation to Amateurliga

Source: RSSSF.com
Rules for classification: 1) Points;
(R) Relegated

== Oberliga Berlin ==
The 1960–61 season saw two new clubs in the league, Kickers 1900 Berlin and BFC Südring, both promoted from the Amateurliga Berlin. The league's top scorer was Helmut Faeder of Hertha BSC Berlin with 17 goals.

Pos	Team	Pld	W	D	L	GF	GA	GD	Pts	Promotion, qualification or relegation
1	Hertha BSC Berlin	27	18	8	1	69	19	+50	44	Qualification to German championship
2	Tasmania 1900 Berlin	27	17	4	6	62	36	+26	38	
3	Tennis Borussia Berlin	27	12	7	8	55	33	+22	31	
4	Spandauer SV	27	13	4	10	45	45	0	30	
5	Wacker 04 Berlin	27	9	5	13	43	50	−7	23	
6	Viktoria 89 Berlin	27	7	9	11	32	43	−11	23	
7	BFC Südring	27	8	5	14	39	53	−14	21	
8	Berliner SV 92	27	8	5	14	29	44	−15	21	
9	Hertha Zehlendorf	27	7	6	14	33	50	−17	20	
10	Kickers 1900 Berlin (R)	27	7	5	15	28	62	−34	19	Relegation to Amateurliga Berlin

Source: RSSSF.com
Rules for classification: 1) Points;
(R) Relegated

== Oberliga West ==
The 1960–61 season saw two new clubs in the league, SV Sodingen and TSV Marl-Hüls, both promoted from the 2. Oberliga West. The league's top scorer was Jürgen Schütz of Borussia Dortmund with 27 goals.

Pos	Team	Pld	W	D	L	GF	GA	GD	Pts	Promotion, qualification or relegation
1	1. FC Köln	30	18	6	6	79	33	+46	42	Qualification to German championship
2	Borussia Dortmund	30	15	9	6	70	46	+24	39	Qualification to German championship
3	FC Schalke 04	30	11	13	6	59	40	+19	35	
4	Rot-Weiß Oberhausen	30	12	11	7	48	36	+12	35	
5	Westfalia Herne	30	13	8	9	60	47	+13	34	
6	Borussia München-Gladbach	30	12	7	11	58	58	0	31	
7	Sportfreunde Hamborn	30	12	7	11	46	48	−2	31	
8	Alemannia Aachen	30	12	5	13	61	61	0	29	
9	Preußen Münster	30	10	7	13	41	50	−9	27	
10	Viktoria Köln	30	11	5	14	49	62	−13	27	
11	Meidericher SV	30	8	10	12	47	48	−1	26	
12	TSV Marl-Hüls	30	10	6	14	41	61	−20	26	
13	Duisburger SV	30	8	10	12	40	67	−27	26	
14	SV Sodingen	30	9	7	14	47	58	−11	25	
15	Rot-Weiß Essen (R)	30	7	10	13	32	46	−14	24	Relegation to 2. Oberliga West
16	VfL Bochum (R)	30	9	5	16	45	62	−17	23	Relegation to 2. Oberliga West

Source: RSSSF.com
Rules for classification: 1) Points;
(R) Relegated

== Oberliga Südwest ==
The 1960–61 season saw two new clubs in the league, TuS Neuendorf and SV Niederlahnstein, both promoted from the 2. Oberliga Südwest. The league's top scorer was Josef Christ of Sportfreunde Saarbrücken with 25 goals.

Pos	Team	Pld	W	D	L	GF	GA	GD	Pts	Promotion, qualification or relegation
1	1. FC Saarbrücken	30	19	4	7	71	40	+31	42	Qualification to German championship
2	Borussia Neunkirchen	30	18	6	6	72	43	+29	42	Qualification to German championship
3	FK Pirmasens	30	17	7	6	79	32	+47	41	
4	1. FC Kaiserslautern	30	14	8	8	52	38	+14	36	
5	FSV Mainz 05	30	10	11	9	37	45	−8	31	
6	Sportfreunde Saarbrücken	30	11	8	11	67	51	+16	30	
7	Wormatia Worms	30	12	6	12	59	56	+3	30	
8	Saar 05 Saarbrücken	30	11	7	12	60	67	−7	29	
9	TuRa Ludwigshafen	30	11	6	13	53	51	+2	28	
10	Phönix Ludwigshafen	30	9	10	11	41	51	−10	28	
11	TuS Neuendorf	30	8	10	12	37	44	−7	26	
12	Eintracht Kreuznach	30	9	8	13	42	53	−11	26	
13	Eintracht Trier	30	10	6	14	39	50	−11	26	
14	SC Ludwigshafen	30	8	9	13	36	47	−11	25	
15	VfR Frankenthal (R)	30	9	5	16	39	63	−24	23	Relegation to 2. Oberliga Südwest
16	SV Niederlahnstein (R)	30	6	5	19	39	83	−44	17	Relegation to 2. Oberliga Südwest

Source: RSSSF.com
Rules for classification: 1) Points;
(R) Relegated

== Oberliga Süd ==
The 1960–61 season saw two new clubs in the league, Jahn Regensburg and SV Waldhof Mannheim, both promoted from the 2. Oberliga Süd. The league's top scorer were Rudolf Brunnenmeier, TSV 1860 München, and Erwin Stein, Eintracht Frankfurt, with 23 goals each.

Pos	Team	Pld	W	D	L	GF	GA	GD	Pts	Promotion, qualification or relegation
1	1. FC Nürnberg (C)	30	23	2	5	96	30	+66	48	Qualification to German championship
2	Eintracht Frankfurt	30	18	5	7	78	38	+40	41	Qualification to German championship
3	Karlsruher SC	30	17	4	9	75	51	+24	38	
4	Kickers Offenbach	30	16	4	10	57	46	+11	36	
5	SSV Reutlingen	30	15	2	13	65	55	+10	32	
6	TSV 1860 München	30	14	4	12	61	66	−5	32	
7	VfB Stuttgart	30	14	2	14	57	53	+4	30	
8	FC Bayern Munich	30	12	6	12	57	54	+3	30	
9	VfR Mannheim	30	13	3	14	53	51	+2	29	
10	FC Bayern Hof	30	9	9	12	41	60	−19	27	
11	SpVgg Fürth	30	11	4	15	40	47	−7	26	
12	FSV Frankfurt	30	9	8	13	45	59	−14	26	
13	SV Waldhof Mannheim	30	10	5	15	47	56	−9	25	
14	FC Schweinfurt 05	30	9	7	14	42	54	−12	25	
15	TSG Ulm 1846 (R)	30	9	6	15	48	62	−14	24	Relegation to 2. Oberliga Süd
16	Jahn Regensburg (R)	30	3	5	22	27	107	−80	11	Relegation to 2. Oberliga Süd

Source: RSSSF.com
Rules for classification: 1) Points;
(C) Champions; (R) Relegated

== German championship ==
The 1961 German football championship was contested by the nine qualified Oberliga teams and won by 1. FC Nürnberg, defeating Borussia Dortmund in the final. The runners-up of the Oberliga Süd and Südwest played a pre-qualifying match. The remaining eight clubs then played a home-and-away round in two groups of four. The two group winners then advanced to the final.

=== Qualifying ===
Team 1	Score	Team 2
Eintracht Frankfurt	5–0	Borussia Neunkirchen

=== Group 1 ===
Pos	Team	Pld	W	D	L	GF	GA	GD	Pts	Promotion, qualification or relegation	DOR	EF	HSV	FCS
1	Borussia Dortmund (Q)	6	3	1	2	19	12	+7	7	Qualified to final	—	0–1	7–2	2–2
2	Eintracht Frankfurt	6	3	1	2	13	9	+4	7		1–2	—	4–2	1–1
3	Hamburger SV	6	3	0	3	14	19	−5	6		2–5	2–1	—	3–0
4	1. FC Saarbrücken	6	1	2	3	11	17	−6	4		4–3	2–5	2–3	—

Source: RSSSF.com
Rules for classification: 1) Points;
(Q) Qualified for the phase indicated

=== Group 2 ===
Pos	Team	Pld	W	D	L	GF	GA	GD	Pts	Promotion, qualification or relegation	FCN	WB	FCK	HB
1	1. FC Nürnberg (Q)	6	4	2	0	18	9	+9	10	Qualified to final	—	4–0	3–3	3–3
2	Werder Bremen	6	2	2	2	8	11	−3	6		2–4	—	1–1	1–0
3	1. FC Köln	6	1	3	2	11	12	−1	5		1–2	1–1	—	3–4
4	Hertha BSC Berlin	6	1	1	4	9	14	−5	3		0–2	1–3	1–2	—

Source: RSSSF.com
Rules for classification: 1) Points;
(Q) Qualified for the phase indicated

=== Final ===
Team 1	Score	Team 2
1. FC Nürnberg	3–0	Borussia Dortmund
