= Sportfreunde Katernberg =

German football club

- Full name: Sportfreunde Katernberg 1913 e.V.
- Founded: 25 March 1913
- Dissolved: 24 March 2017
- Ground: Sportplatz "Am Lindenbruch"
- 2016–17: Kreisliga B Essen (IX), 9th
Home colours	Away colours

Sportfreunde Katernberg was a German association football club from the Katernberg suburb of Essen, North Rhine-Westphalia. The club's greatest success was a runners-up finish in the tier one Oberliga West in 1947–48 which qualified the club to participate in the German football championship.

Apart from football the club also offered a chess department when the team was a long-term member of the Chess Bundesliga.

== History ==
Formed in 1913 the club played its first three decades as a non-descript local side. Sportfreunde took part in the 1943 Tschammerpokal, the German Cup, but lost 4–2 to FC Schalke 04 in the second round after defeating Luxembourg side FK Niederkorn in the first round. It won promotion to the Gauliga Niederrhein in 1944 but the league was cancelled after only one round because of the effects of the Second World War.

Sportfreunde Katernberg became part of the new tier one Oberliga West when it was formed in 1947. In the league's inaugural season the club finished runners-up, two points behind champions Borussia Dortmund, and qualified for the championship of the British occupation zone, a qualifying competition for the German football championship. Katernberg lost to Eintracht Braunschweig in the quarter-finals and was knocked out. The season after the club finished thirteenth and was relegated to the 2. Oberliga West. In this new competition Katernberg won one of the two divisions and was promoted back to the Oberliga alongside Borussia Mönchengladbach.

Sportfreunde Katernberg spend three more seasons in the Oberliga from 1950 to 1953 but never came close to the success of 1947–48 and was eventually relegated back to the 2. Oberliga. Two seasons in this league followed until another relegation in 1955 took the club permanently from the top levels of German football.

Katernberg played the 1955–56 season in one of the three divisions of the tier three Landesliga Niederrhein but, finishing eighth, did not qualify for the new Verbandsliga Niederrhein. It won promotion to this league in 1958 but lasted for only two seasons before dropping into local football in 1960. It briefly returned to the Verbandsliga for a season in 1976–77 before dropping down again.

The club experienced a brief revival in the late 1980s, winning promotion to the Verbandsliga again in 1988. It won the league in 1988–89 and was promoted to the tier three Oberliga Nordrhein. Katernberg spend two seasons in this league, finishing thirteenth in 1989–90 but coming last in 1990–91. Back in the Verbandsliga Sportfreunde suffered another relegation in 1991–92 and permanently dropped back into local amateur football again where it played until 2016–17. In March 2017, the club merged with DJK Katernberg to become DJK Sportfreunde Katernberg, whose first team replaced the former in Kreisliga A, while the second team took over Sportfreunde in Kreisliga B.

== Honours ==
The club's honours:

- Oberliga West
  - Runners-up: 1947–48
- Verbandsliga Niederrhein
  - Champions: 1988–89
- Landesliga Niederrhein
  - Champions: 1957–58, 1975–76, 1987–88

== Recent seasons ==
The recent season-by-season performance of the club:

Season	Division	Tier	Position
2003–04	Bezirksliga Group 4	VII	10th
2004–05	Bezirksliga Group 4	VII	13th
2005–06	Bezirksliga Group 4	VII	15th ↓
2006–07	Kreisliga A Essen	VIII	4th
2007–08	Kreisliga A Essen	VIII	3rd
2008–09	Kreisliga A Essen	IX	1st ↑
2009–10	Bezirksliga Group 6	VIII	7th
2010–11	Bezirksliga Group 6	VIII	16th ↓
2011–12	Kreisliga A Essen	IX	6th
2012–13	Kreisliga A Essen	VIII	14th ↓
2013–14	Kreisliga B Essen	IX	5th
2014–15	Kreisliga B Essen	IX	1st ↑
2015–16	Kreisliga A Essen	VIII	16th ↓
2016–17	Kreisliga B Essen	IX	9th

- With the introduction of the Regionalligas in 1994 and the 3. Liga in 2008 as the new third tier, below the 2. Bundesliga, all leagues below dropped one tier. With the elevation of the tier six Verbandsliga Niederrhein to Oberliga status in 2012 all leagues below were elevated one tier.

↑ Promoted	↓ Relegated
