= Ferdinand Heidkamp =

German footballer (1944–2019)

Personal information
- Full name: Paul-Ferdinand Heidkamp
- Date of birth: 14 September 1944
- Place of birth: Düsseldorf, Germany
- Date of death: 28 June 2019 (aged 74)
- Place of death: Bastia, France
- Height: 1.81 m (5 ft 11 in)
- Position: Defender

Youth career
- –1963: SV Schlebusch

Senior career*
Years	Team	Apps	(Gls)
1963–1965	Viktoria Köln	44	(0)
1965–1967	Hamborn 07	44	(0)
1967–1969	Kickers Offenbach	73	(1)
1969–1971	Borussia Dortmund	52	(2)
1971–1972	Fortuna Köln	2	(0)
1972–1973	KFC Diest		
1973–1976	Bastia	112	(0)
1976–1977	Lille	12	(0)
1977–1978	GFCO Ajaccio	12	(2)

International career
1963	Germany U18	5	(0)
- * Club domestic league appearances and goals

Paul-Ferdinand Heidkamp (14 September 1944 – 28 June 2019) was a German footballer. He played as a defender for Kickers Offenbach and Borussia Dortmund in the Bundesliga in the late 1960s and early 1970s, also having an four-year stint in France for Bastia and Lille throughout the 1970s. He also represented Germany for the 1963 UEFA European Under-18 Championship.

== Career ==
Already establishing himself throughout his youth career with his hometown club SV Schlebusch, he signed up to play for SC Viktoria Köln for the 1963–94 Regionalliga. Throughout his two seasons for the club, he made 44 appearances before moving to Hamborn 07 for an additional two seasons before moving to Kickers Offenbach. Throughout their previous two seaosns, Offenbach helped the team reached the Bundesliga promotional playoffs but had failed to achieve promotion. The 1967–68 season saw Heidkamp be a part of the team that won their group before playing in all eight matches in the promotional playoffs, helping the club achieve their long-awaited promotion to the top-league of German football. During the first matchday of the following 1968–69 season saw Heidkamp made his Bundesliga debut against Köln on 27 August 1968 which ended in a 2–1 loss. Despite playing 31 matchdays alongside other players such as Rudolf Wimmer, Egon Schmitt, Hermann Nuber, Roland Weida and Gerd Becker, they were unable to prevent Offenbach's relegation. Seeing their decline, Heidkamp signed for Borussia Dortmund. Throughout his brief stint with Dortmund, he played alongside Jürgen Rynio, Rudi Assauer, Sigfried Held and Hoppy Kurrat but the club was similarly relegated in the following 1970–71 season, causing him to return to the Regionalliga West to play for Kickers Offenbach. However, he then chose to play abroad in Belgium with KFC Diest. He spent the remainder of his career in France, first playing for Bastia after his arrival to Corsica in 1973 after impressing club manager Pierre Cahuzac. Throughout his career with I Turchini, Heidkampt lived in his home in Biguglia with his wife and son and formed a friendship with teammate Charles Orlanducci as he helped him assimilate to the local Corsican culture. He spend the remainder of the decade with Lille and GFCO Ajaccio within the Ligue 1 until his retirement in 1978.

== International career ==
Due to his successful youth career, he caught the attention of the German Football Association and signed him to play in the two qualification matches against Austria for the 1963 UEFA European Under-18 Championship. At the time, Heidkamp played as a midfielder as he would successfully help the team beat out Austria in qualifying. Following their success, he remained in the squad for the final tournament in April that year. He played in the three group games against Greece (2–7), Scotland (2–1) and Greece (2–1). Within the attacking formation, he played alongside other players such as, Helmut Sandmann, Klaus Zaczyk, Willi Dürrschnabel and Günter Netzer were among his teammates though West Germany would end up being eliminated from the group stage, narrowly eliminated by Scotland on goal difference.

== Later life ==
Heidkamp moved to Ajaccio in his later years until his death on 28 June 2019.
