= Wilhelm Burgsmüller =

German footballer (1932–2025)

Personal information
- Date of birth: 18 January 1932
- Place of birth: Dortmund, Westphalia, Prussia, Germany
- Date of death: 8 April 2025 (aged 93)
- Position: Defender

Senior career*
Years	Team	Apps	(Gls)
1952–1966	Borussia Dortmund	241	(0)
- * Club domestic league appearances and goals

Wilhelm Burgsmüller (18 January 1932 – 8 April 2025) was a German footballer who played as a defender for Borussia Dortmund between 1952 and 1966. He appeared 19 times for the club in the inaugural Bundesliga season. Burgsmüller died on 8 April 2025, at the age of 93.

== Honours ==
Borussia Dortmund

- German football championship: 1956, 1957, 1963
