= Alfred Kelbassa =

German footballer

Personal information
- Date of birth: 21 April 1925
- Place of birth: Gelsenkirchen-Buer, Germany
- Date of death: 11 August 1988 (aged 63)
- Place of death: Dortmund, West Germany
- Position: Forward

Senior career*
Years	Team	Apps	(Gls)
1946–1952	STV Horst Emscher	135	(80)
1952–1953	Preußen Münster	25	(10)
1953–1954	STV Horst Emscher	28	(21)
1954–1963	Borussia Dortmund	183	(104)
Total		371	(215)

International career
1956–1958	West Germany	6	(2)
- * Club domestic league appearances and goals

Alfred Kelbassa (21 April 1925 – 11 August 1988) was a German football player.

Kelbassa played for Preußen Münster (1952–1953) and Borussia Dortmund (1954–1963).

He played for West Germany 6 times, scoring two goals, and was a participant at the 1958 FIFA World Cup.

== Honours ==
=== Club ===
Borussia Dortmund

- German football championship (3): 1956, 1957, 1963
