= Heinz Beck (footballer) =

German footballer

Personal information
- Full name: Heinz Beck
- Date of birth: 19 August 1928
- Place of birth: Germany
- Date of death: 12 December 2006 (aged 78)
- Place of death: Germany
- Position: Forward

Senior career*
Years	Team	Apps	(Gls)
1946–1952	FV Daxlanden		
1952	VfB Mühlburg		
1952–1961	Karlsruher SC	161	(114)
- * Club domestic league appearances and goals

Heinz Beck (19 August 1928 – 12 December 2006) was a former football player best known for his stint at Karlsruher SC. In 1957 he became the season's top-scorer in the southern second division. He moved to Karlsruhe in 1952 from FV Daxlanden. Beck was a tall player, blessed with the ability to find space for headed goals.

Between 1952 and 1961 he played 161 times and scored 114 goals. He helped KSC win the South German title three times, and played in the 1956 German Cup final. In a German football almanac he was described as a player who had "the style of a British professional, with various tricks at his disposal and an instinct for goal."

At the end of his career, Beck was active as a coach in amateur leagues, seeking out new talent.
