= Oberliga Nord (1947–1963) =

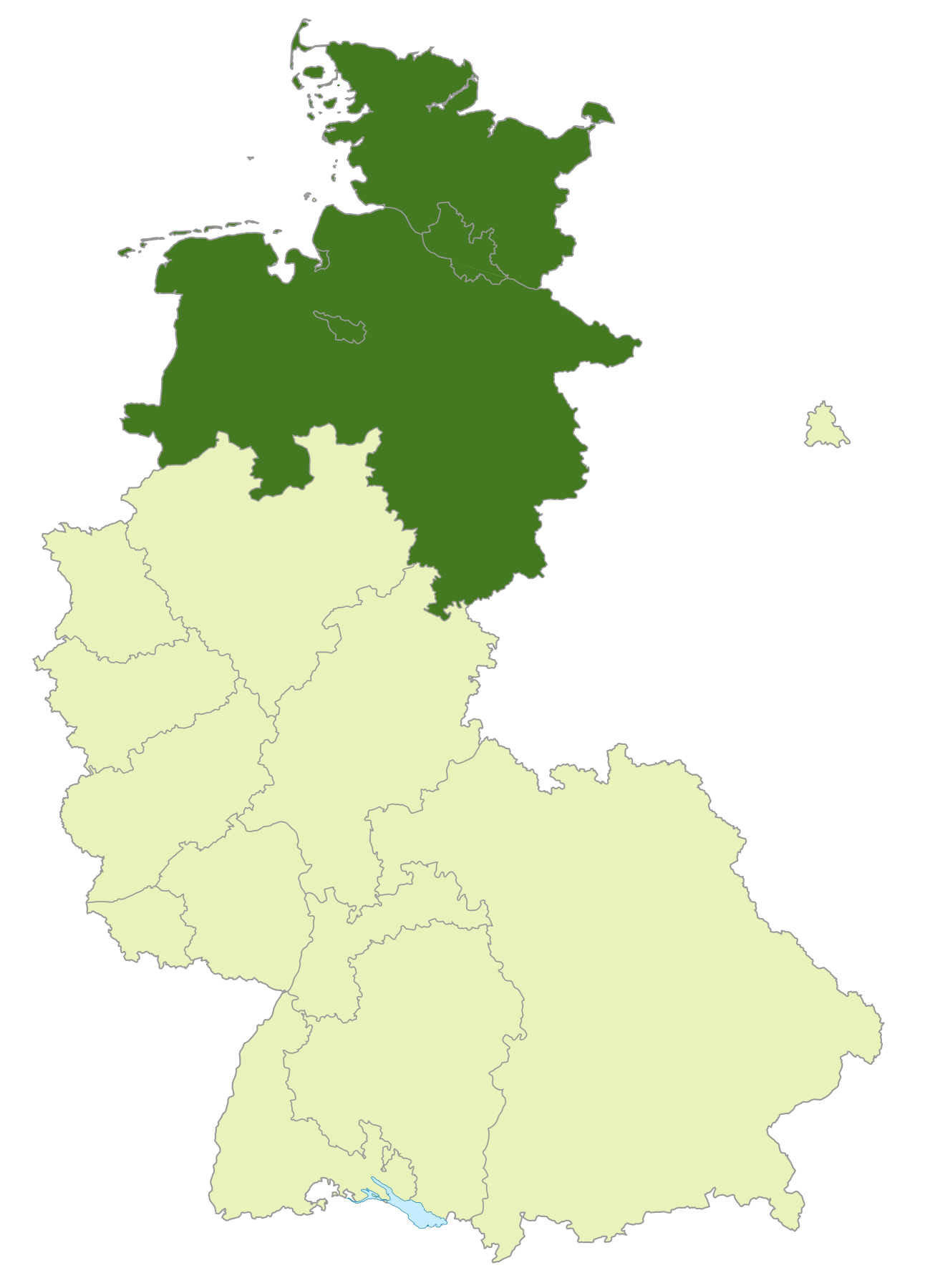
- Founded: 1947
- Folded: 1963 (16 seasons)
- Replaced by: Bundesliga
- Country: West Germany
- State: Lower Saxony; Schleswig-Holstein; Bremen; Hamburg
- Level on pyramid: Level 1
- Relegation to: Amateurliga Hamburg; Amateurliga Bremen; Amateurliga Niedersachsen-Ost; Amateurliga Niedersachsen-West; Amateurliga Schleswig-Holstein
- Last champions: Hamburger SV (1962–63)

The Oberliga Nord (English: Premier league North) was the highest level of the German football league system in the north of Germany from 1947 until the formation of the Bundesliga in 1963. It covered the states of Lower Saxony, Bremen, Hamburg, and Schleswig-Holstein.

== Overview ==
The league was created in 1947 as the highest level of football in the north of Germany, then part of the British occupation zone. It replaced the various Gauligas, which had existed until 1945 in the region:

- Gauliga Braunschweig-Südhannover
- Gauliga Hamburg
- Gauliga Osthannover
- Gauliga Schleswig-Holstein
- Gauliga Weser-Ems

It was, together with the Oberliga West, the last of the five Oberligas to be formed, the other four being:

- Oberliga West (formed in 1947)
- Oberliga Berlin (formed in 1945, originally with clubs from West and East Berlin until 1950)
- Oberliga Südwest (formed in 1945)
- Oberliga Süd (formed in 1945)

The league was formed from twelve clubs in 1947, four from Hamburg, three from Lower Saxony (South), three from Lower Saxony (North, incorporating Bremen at the time) and two from Schleswig-Holstein.

With the reintroduction of the German championship in 1948, the winners and (in most cases) runners-up of the Oberliga Nord went on to the finals tournament with the other Oberliga champions. In 1950, when 16 clubs were admitted, VfL Osnabrück competed as well, having finished 3rd in the North. In 1954, runners-up FC St.Pauli did not qualify because the number of participants was reduced to six clubs. In the period from 1948 to 1963, only two teams from the north of Germany won the national title, Hannover 96 (1954) and Hamburger SV (1960).

The league was completely dominated by Hamburger SV, who won it 15 out of 16 times, failing in 1954 only by finishing eleventh (the position influenced to some extent by a deduction of four points).

Unlike the other Oberligas, the Oberliga Nord never formed a 2nd Oberliga as the second tier, the five local Amateurligas remained at this level instead.

== Reforming of the Oberliga Nord ==
In 1974, with the disbanding of the Regionalliga Nord, the Oberliga Nord was re-created, but now as the third tier of German football. Geographically, it covered the same region as the old Oberliga Nord.

== Founding members of the Oberliga Nord ==
- Hamburger SV
- FC St. Pauli
- Eintracht Braunschweig
- VfL Osnabrück
- Werder Bremen
- Arminia Hannover
- VfB Lübeck
- Concordia Hamburg
- Bremer SV
- Holstein Kiel
- Hannover 96
- SC Victoria Hamburg

== Disbanding of the Oberliga ==
With the introduction of the new Bundesliga, the Oberligas were disbanded. The top three teams of the Oberliga Nord were admitted to the Bundesliga, the other thirteen clubs went to the Regionalliga Nord, one of the five new second divisions.

Admitted to Bundesliga:

- Hamburger SV
- SV Werder Bremen
- Eintracht Braunschweig

The following teams from the Oberliga went to the new Regionalliga:

- VfR Neumünster
- Holstein Kiel
- FC St. Pauli
- VfL Osnabrück
- VfV Hildesheim
- Hannover 96
- Arminia Hannover
- ASV Bergedorf 85
- VfB Oldenburg
- TuS Bremerhaven 93
- Concordia Hamburg
- FC Altona 93
- VfB Lübeck

== Qualifying for the Bundesliga ==
The qualifying system for the new league was fairly complex. The league placings of the clubs playing in the Oberligen for the last ten seasons were taken into consideration, whereby results from 1952 to 1955 counted once, results from 1955 to 1959 counted double and results from 1959 to 1963 triple. A first-place finish was awarded 16 points, a sixteenth place one point. Appearances in the German championship or DFB-Pokal finals were also rewarded with points. The five Oberliga champions of the 1962–63 season were granted direct access to the Bundesliga. All up, 46 clubs applied for the 16 available Bundesliga slots.

Following this system, by 11 January 1963, the DFB announced nine fixed clubs for the new league and reduced the clubs eligible for the remaining seven places to 20. Clubs within the same Oberliga that were separated by less than 50 points were considered on equal rank and the 1962-63 placing was used to determine the qualified team.

Eight clubs applied for Bundesliga membership, of those Hamburger SV and Werder Bremen qualified early (11 January 1963). The third place went to Eintracht Braunschweig due to their third-place finish in 1962–63 even though their overall points put them in seventh spot in the ranking, but within 50 points of third-placed VfL Osnabrück. Osnabrück finished seventh in 1962–63.

Points table:

Rank	Club	Points 1952 to 1963	Place in 1962–63
1	Hamburger SV ^{1}	518	1
2	Werder Bremen ^{1}	396	2
3	VfL Osnabrück ^{2}	313	7
4	Hannover 96 ^{2}	309	9
5	FC St. Pauli ^{2}	303	6
6	Holstein Kiel ^{2}	294	5
7	Eintracht Braunschweig ^{2}	276	3
8	Arminia Hannover ^{3}	103	10

- Source: DSFS Liga-Chronik (in German), page: B 11, accessed: 4 November 2008
- Bold Denotes club qualified for the new Bundesliga.
- ^{1} Denotes club was one of the nine selected on 11 January 1963.
- ^{2} Denotes club was one of the 20 taken into final selection.
- ^{3} Denotes club was one of the 15 applicants which were removed from final selection.
- ^{4} Denotes club withdrew Bundesliga application.

== Honours ==
The winners and runners-up of the Oberliga Nord:

**Season**	**Winner**	**Runner-Up**
1947–48	Hamburger SV	FC St. Pauli
1948–49	Hamburger SV	FC St. Pauli
1949–50	Hamburger SV	FC St. Pauli
1950–51	Hamburger SV	FC St. Pauli
1951–52	Hamburger SV	VfL Osnabrück
1952–53	Hamburger SV	Holstein Kiel
1953–54	**Hannover 96**	FC St. Pauli
1954–55	Hamburger SV	TuS Bremerhaven 93
1955–56	Hamburger SV	Hannover 96
1956–57	Hamburger SV	Holstein Kiel
1957–58	Hamburger SV	Eintracht Braunschweig
1958–59	Hamburger SV	Werder Bremen
1959–60	**Hamburger SV**	Werder Bremen
1960–61	Hamburger SV	Werder Bremen
1961–62	Hamburger SV	Werder Bremen
1962–63	Hamburger SV	Werder Bremen

- **Bold** denotes team went on to win German Championship.

== Placings & all-time table of the Oberliga Nord ==
The final placings and all-time table of the Oberliga Nord:

Club	48	49	50	51	52	53	54	55	56	57	58	59	60	61	62	63	S	G	GF	GA	Points
Hamburger SV	**1**	**1**	**1**	**1**	**1**	**1**	11	**1**	**1**	**1**	**1**	**1**	**1**	**1**	**1**	**1**	16	539	1609	758	784
SV Werder Bremen	4	8	4	6	7	3	5	3	6	5	7	2	2	2	2	2	16	488	1207	878	586
FC St. Pauli	2	2	2	2	3	9	2	7	13	4	9	7	4	4	4	6	16	483	941	723	566
VfL Osnabrück	5	3	3	4	2	4	12	9	10	6	4	4	3	3	7	7	16	473	927	743	532
Hannover 96	11		7	11	11	7	**1**	5	2	3	10	6	6	5	13	9	15	456	824	777	476
Eintracht Braunschweig	3	4	5	10	14		4	6	11	7	2	5	8	9	6	3	15	441	869	798	474
Holstein Kiel	10		11	3	5	2	9	10	4	2	8	10	9	7	5	5	15	451	850	802	470
TuS Bremerhaven 93		12	10	8	8	8	7	2	7	9	5	9	5	14	14	13	15	452	758	845	443
FC Altona 93				15		6	3	4	9	11	3	8	11	6	11	15	12	362	654	708	353
Concordia Hamburg	8	9	6	12	12	15				12	6	12	12	12	12	14	13	376	640	752	329
Arminia Hannover	6	10	12	13	9	12	6	12	3	15						10	11	316	545	618	287
SC Göttingen 05		11	13	9	6	5	10	13	8	10	16						10	294	515	594	265
VfR Neumünster									5	8	12	3	10	11	8	4	8	240	351	396	239
Eimsbütteler TV		6	8	5	4	10	8	8	16								8	234	419	454	225
Bremer SV	9	5	14	7	10	13	13	15							15		9	256	436	552	216
VfB Lübeck	7	7	15			11	15				15		14	15		16	9	254	346	509	202
VfB Oldenburg			9	16				11	15					10	10	12	7	212	312	428	177
VfV Hildesheim												13	7	8	3	8	5	150	246	248	153
ASV Bergedorf 85												11	13	13	9	11	5	150	215	287	129
VfL Wolfsburg								14	14	14	11	16					5	150	228	299	117
Eintracht Nordhorn									12	13	13	15			16		5	150	196	333	107
Eintracht Osnabrück				14	13	16							16				4	122	193	299	80
Harburger TB			16			14	14	16									4	120	162	306	74
1. FC Phönix Lübeck											14	14	15				3	90	113	192	67
SC Victoria Hamburg	12				15		16										3	82	100	191	51
Heider SV										16				16			2	60	66	118	37
Lüneburger SK					16												1	30	40	119	11
Itzehoer SV				17													1	32	42	118	9

Source:"All-time table Oberliga Nord". Clas Glenning. Archived from the original on 2009-07-31.

- Table includes results from the finals rounds of the German championship.

== See also ==
- Verbandsliga Norddeutschland
