= Elwin Schlebrowski =

German footballer (1925–2000)

Personal information
- Full name: Elwin Schlebrowski
- Date of birth: 31 August 1925
- Place of birth: Germany
- Date of death: 8 February 2000 (aged 74)
- Position: Midfielder

Senior career*
Years	Team	Apps	(Gls)
1951–1960	Borussia Dortmund		

International career
1956	West Germany	2	(0)
- * Club domestic league appearances and goals

Elwin Schlebrowski (31 August 1925 – 8 February 2000) was a German international footballer who played as a midfielder for Borussia Dortmund.
