= Heinz Kwiatkowski =

German footballer

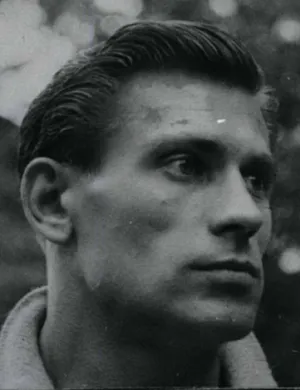

Personal information
- Full name: Heinrich Kwiatkowski
- Date of birth: 16 July 1926
- Place of birth: Gelsenkirchen, Germany
- Date of death: 23 May 2008 (aged 81)
- Place of death: Dortmund, Germany
- Height: 1.80 m (5 ft 11 in)
- Position: Goalkeeper

Senior career*
Years	Team	Apps	(Gls)
1947–1950	Schalke 04		
1950–1952	Rot-Weiss Essen		
1952–1966	Borussia Dortmund	300	(0)

International career
1954–1958	West Germany	4	(0)

Managerial career
- 1964: Borussia Dortmund
Medal record
Representing West Germany
FIFA World Cup
Winner	1954 Switzerland
- * Club domestic league appearances and goals

Heinrich "Heinz" Kwiatkowski (16 July 1926 – 23 May 2008) was a German football goalkeeper. He was born in Gelsenkirchen. As a goalkeeper, Kwiatkowski's specialty was to fist the ball away, which earned him the nickname "Heini Fausten".

== Career ==
During his club career, Kwiatkowski played for FC Schalke 04, Rot-Weiß Essen and Borussia Dortmund. He won the German football championship with Dortmund in 1956 and 1957. He was one of the oldest players to make their debuts in the newly formed Bundesliga, when he played against Nürnberg on 21 March 1964, aged 37 years and 249 days.

He was a member of the West German team that won the 1954 FIFA World Cup. He also participated in the 1958 FIFA World Cup. In total, he earned four caps for West Germany.
