= Wolfgang Peters =

German footballer

Personal information
- Full name: Wolfgang Peters
- Date of birth: 8 January 1929
- Place of birth: Germany
- Date of death: 22 September 2003 (aged 74)
- Position: Winger

Senior career*
Years	Team	Apps	(Gls)
1954–1963	Borussia Dortmund		

International career
1957	West Germany	1	(0)
- * Club domestic league appearances and goals

Wolfgang Peters (8 January 1929 – 22 September 2003) was a German football player.

Peters played for Borussia Dortmund (1954–1963).

On the national level he played for Germany national team, and was a participant at the 1958 FIFA World Cup.
