= Oberliga West (1947–1963) =

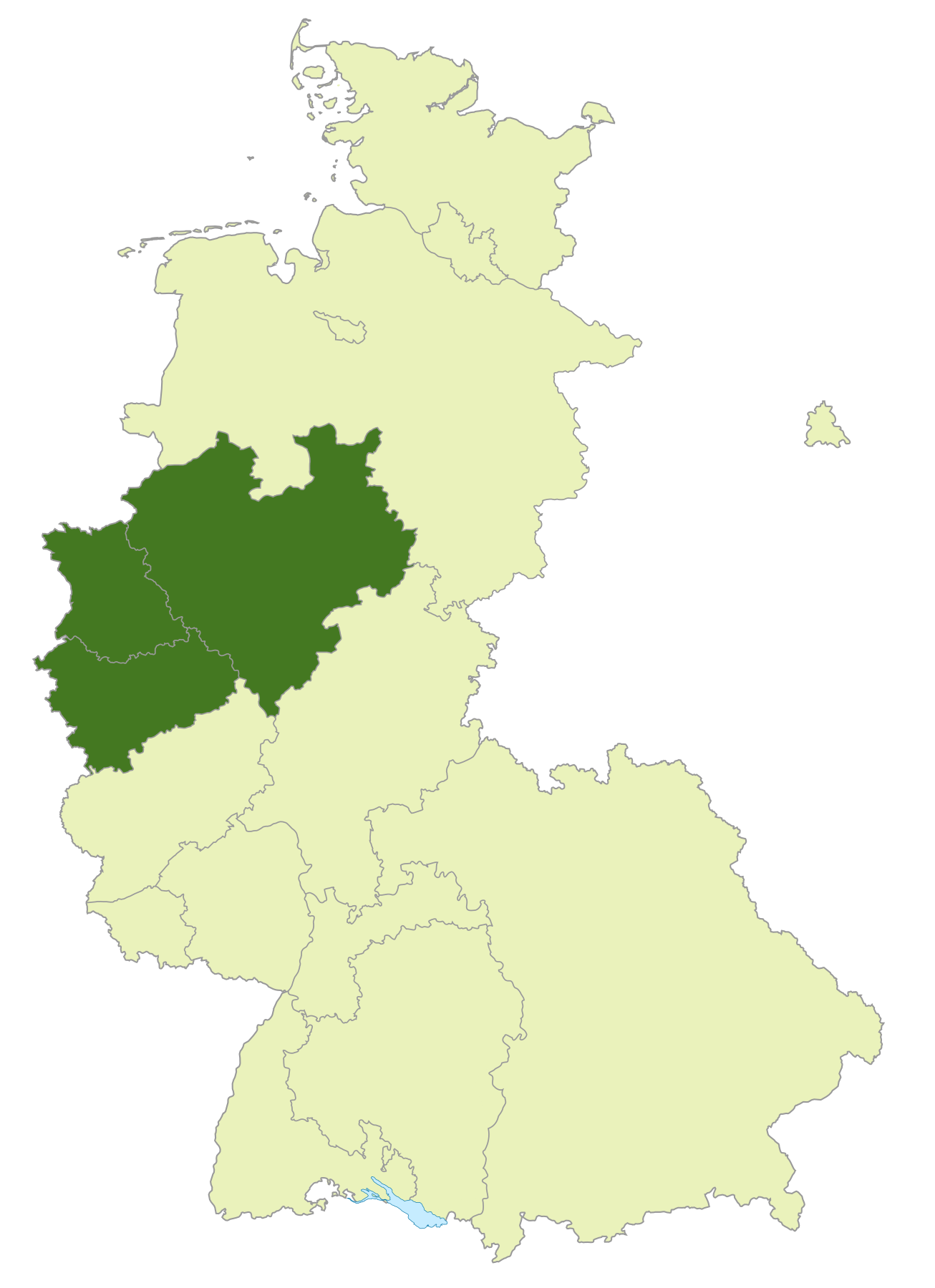
- Founded: 1947
- Folded: 1963 (16 seasons)
- Replaced by: Bundesliga
- Country: Germany
- State: North Rhine-Westphalia
- Level on pyramid: Level 1
- Relegation to: 2. Oberliga West
- Last champions: 1. FC Köln; (1962–63)

The Oberliga West (English: Premier League West) was the highest level of the German football league system in the west of Germany from 1947 until the formation of the Bundesliga in 1963. It covered the state of North Rhine-Westphalia, the most populous state of Germany.

== Overview ==
The league was created in 1947 as the highest level of football in the newly created state of North Rhine-Westphalia, then part of the British occupation zone. It replaced the various Gauligas, which had existed until 1945 in the region:

- Gauliga Köln-Aachen
- Gauliga Moselland
- Gauliga Niederrhein
- Gauliga Westfalen

The league was, together with the Oberliga Nord, the last of the five Oberligas to be formed, the other four being:

- Oberliga Nord (formed in 1947)
- Oberliga Berlin (formed in 1945, originally with clubs from West and East Berlin)
- Oberliga Südwest (formed in 1945)
- Oberliga Süd (formed in 1945)

The Oberliga West was formed from thirteen clubs from the Landesligas Niederrhein, Mittelrhein and Westfalen. The Landesligas remained the second tier of football in the West until 1949, when the 2. Oberliga West was formed.

With the reintroduction of the German championship in 1948, the winner and runners-up of the Oberliga West went on to the finals tournament with the other Oberliga champions. The Oberliga West, together with the Oberliga Süd, were the strongest of the five Oberligas, winning six German titles each in the Oberliga period from 1948 to 1963.

== Founding members of the Oberliga West ==
- Borussia Dortmund
- Sportfreunde Katernberg
- STV Horst-Emscher
- Hamborn 07
- Rot-Weiß Oberhausen
- FC Schalke 04
- Fortuna Düsseldorf
- SpVgg Erkenschwick
- Alemannia Aachen
- TSG Vohwinkel (merged to become Wuppertaler SV)
- Preußen Dellbrück (merged to become Viktoria Köln)
- VfR Köln (merged to become Viktoria Köln)
- VfL Witten

== Disbanding of the Oberliga ==
With the introduction of the Bundesliga, five teams from the Oberliga West were admitted to the new Bundesliga. The remaining clubs went to the new Regionalliga West, one of five new second divisions.

The teams admitted to the Bundesliga were:

- 1. FC Köln
- Borussia Dortmund
- Meidericher SV
- SC Preußen Münster
- FC Schalke 04

The following teams from the Oberliga went to the new Regionalliga:

- Alemannia Aachen
- Schwarz-Weiß Essen
- Viktoria Köln
- Bayer Leverkusen
- Rot-Weiß Oberhausen
- Borussia Mönchengladbach
- Hamborn 07
- Fortuna Düsseldorf
- Westfalia Herne
- Wuppertaler SV
- TSV Marl-Hüls

== Qualifying for the Bundesliga ==
The qualifying system for the new league was fairly complex. The league placings of the clubs playing in the Oberligen for the last ten seasons were taken into consideration, whereby results from 1952 to 1955 counted once, results from 1955 to 1959 counted double and results from 1959 to 1963 triple. A first-place finish was awarded 16 points, a sixteenth place one point. Appearances in the German championship or DFB-Pokal finals were also rewarded with points. The five Oberliga champions of the 1962–63 season were granted direct access to the Bundesliga. All up, 46 clubs applied for the 16 available Bundesliga slots.

Following this system, by 11 January 1963, the DFB announced nine fixed clubs for the new league and reduced the clubs eligible for the remaining seven places to 20. Clubs within the same Oberliga that were separated by less than 50 points were considered on equal rank and the 1962-63 placing was used to determine the qualified team.

All Oberliga West clubs except TSV Marl-Hüls applied for Bundesliga membership. Borussia Dortmund, 1. FC Köln and FC Schalke 04 qualified early. Meidericher SV and Preußen Münster qualified even though both clubs had less points than Alemannia Aachen. Aachen finished fifth, Meidericher SV came in fourth and Preußen Münster earned a third-place finish in 1962–63.

Points table:

Rank	Club	Points 1952 to 1963	Place in 1962–63
1	1. FC Köln ^{1}	466	1
2	Borussia Dortmund ^{1}	440	2
3	FC Schalke 04 ^{1}	396	6
4	Alemannia Aachen ^{2}	285	5
5	Preußen Münster ^{2}	251	4
6	Meidericher SV ^{2}	250	3
7	Fortuna Düsseldorf ^{2}	225	13
8	Westfalia Herne ^{2}	222	14
9	Viktoria Köln ^{3}	201	8
10	Schwarz-Weiß Essen ^{2}	167	7
11	Rot-Weiß Oberhausen ^{2}	154	10
12	Borussia Mönchengladbach ^{3}	155	11
13	Hamborn 07 ^{3}	101	12
14	Bayer Leverkusen ^{3}	88	9
15	Wuppertaler SV ^{4}	52	15

- Source: DSFS Liga-Chronik (in German), page: B 11, accessed: 4 November 2008
- Bold Denotes club qualified for the new Bundesliga.
- ^{1} Denotes club was one of the nine selected on 11 January 1963.
- ^{2} Denotes club was one of the 20 taken into final selection.
- ^{3} Denotes club was one of the 15 applicants which were removed from final selection.
- ^{4} Denotes club withdrew Bundesliga application.

== Honours ==
The winners and runners-up of the Oberliga West:

Season	Winner	Runner-Up
1947–48	Borussia Dortmund	Sportfreunde Katernberg
1948–49	Borussia Dortmund	Rot-Weiß Essen
1949–50	Borussia Dortmund	Preußen Dellbrück
1950–51	FC Schalke 04	SC Preußen Münster
1951–52	Rot-Weiß Essen	FC Schalke 04
1952–53	Borussia Dortmund	1. FC Köln
1953–54	1. FC Köln	Rot-Weiß Essen
1954–55	**Rot-Weiß Essen**	SV Sodingen
1955–56	**Borussia Dortmund**	FC Schalke 04
1956–57	**Borussia Dortmund**	Duisburger SV
1957–58	**FC Schalke 04**	1. FC Köln
1958–59	Westfalia Herne	1. FC Köln
1959–60	1. FC Köln	Westfalia Herne
1960–61	1. FC Köln	Borussia Dortmund
1961–62	**1. FC Köln**	FC Schalke 04
1962–63	1. FC Köln	**Borussia Dortmund**

Source: "Oberliga West". Das deutsche Fussball-Archiv.

- **Bold** denotes team went on to win German championship.

== Placings & all-time table of the Oberliga West ==
The final placings and all-time table of the Oberliga West:

Club	48	49	50	51	52	53	54	55	56	57	58	59	60	61	62	63	S	G	GF	GA	Points
Borussia Dortmund	**1**	**1**	**1**	3	4	**1**	5	5	**1**	**1**	5	5	3	2	8	2	16	506	1243	738	654
1. FC Köln			5	4	5	2	**1**	8	7	3	2	2	**1**	**1**	**1**	**1**	14	463	1097	657	591
FC Schalke 04	6	12	6	**1**	2	6	3	6	2	4	**1**	11	4	3	2	6	16	495	1051	753	587
Alemannia Aachen	9	8	12	15	3	5	9	11	3	5	3	10	9	8	11	5	16	469	847	853	484
Rot-Weiß Essen		2	3	6	**1**	3	2	**1**	5	8	7	6	6	15			13	399	802	604	470
Preußen Münster		4	8	2	7	7	4	9	12	13	6	7	10	9	7	4	15	451	810	764	466
Fortuna Düsseldorf	7	11		5	12	9	10	7	6	6	8	3	15		9	13	14	408	763	725	405
Meidericher SV					8	4	11	15		7	4	8	8	11	5	3	11	330	546	517	343
Rot-Weiß Oberhausen	5	5	11	13							11	12	13	4	3	10	10	288	439	468	290
Westfalia Herne								13	13	11	12	**1**	2	5	6	14	9	280	481	461	284
Duisburger SV			10	16				4	4	2	10	9	5	13	16		10	303	447	558	276
Hamborn 07	4	6	9	7	16				16		16		12	7	12	12	11	319	439	590	264
Borussia Mönchengladbach				14		14	12	14	11	16		13	14	6	13	11	11	331	503	762	263
Preussen Dellbrück *	11		2	8	9	8	13	10	14	12							9	268	425	483	255
Schwarz-Weiß Essen					11	13	6	12	8	15			16		4	7	9	270	463	471	252
SV Sodingen						11	14	2	9	14	13	15		14	15		9	277	404	479	240
STV Horst-Emscher	3	3	4	10	13	12	16					16					8	230	383	475	202
VfL Bochum							8	16		10	14	4	11	16			7	210	331	374	193
Bayer 04 Leverkusen					6	10	7	3	15							9	6	180	298	337	175
Viktoria Köln											9	14	7	10	10	8	6	180	366	415	166
SpVgg Erkenschwick	8	9	7	11	14	16											6	168	267	343	143
Sportfreunde Katernberg	2	13		12	10	15											5	139	251	308	124
Wuppertaler SV *									10	9	15					15	4	120	173	240	100
Rheydter SV				9	15		15										3	90	150	221	71
TSV Marl-Hüls														12	14	16	3	90	130	212	65
TSG Vohwinkel *	10	7	14														3	78	116	161	63
Rhenania Würselen		10	13														2	54	78	100	47
VfR Köln *	12																1	24	23	43	17
Arminia Bielefeld			15														1	30	32	72	17
Duisburger FV 08			16														1	30	29	66	14
VfL Witten	13																1	24	30	56	13

Source: "All-time table Oberliga West". Clas Glenning. Archived from the original on 2009-07-31.

- Table includes results from the finals rounds of the German Championship.
- Preussen Dellbrück merged with SC Rapid Köln in 1957 to form Viktoria Köln. SC Rapid Köln itself was a merger club, incorporating VfR Köln.
- SSV Wuppertal and TSG Vohwinkel merged in 1954 to form Wuppertaler SV.
