= Helmut Bracht =

German footballer and manager

Personal information
- Date of birth: 11 September 1929
- Place of birth: Dortmund, Germany
- Date of death: 12 May 2011 (aged 81)
- Position: Midfielder

Senior career*
Years	Team	Apps	(Gls)
1947–1948	Lüner SV		
1948–1953	Westfalia Herne		
1953–1955	SpVgg Herten		
1955–1964	Borussia Dortmund		

Managerial career
- 1970: Borussia Dortmund
- * Club domestic league appearances and goals

Helmut Bracht (born 11 September 1929 in Dortmund; died 12 May 2011) was a German footballer who played as a midfielder for Westfalia Herne and Borussia Dortmund. He appeared 11 times for Dortmund in the inaugural Bundesliga season, and had a brief spell as manager of the club in 1970.

== Honours ==
- German football championship: 1963
