= Alfred Niepieklo =

German footballer (1927–2014)

Personal information
- Date of birth: 11 June 1927
- Place of birth: Castrop-Rauxel, Germany
- Date of death: 2 April 2014 (aged 86)
- Place of death: Castrop-Rauxel, Germany
- Position: Forward

Senior career*
Years	Team	Apps	(Gls)
1946–1951	SG Castrop-Rauxel		
1951–1960	Borussia Dortmund		
- * Club domestic league appearances and goals

Alfred Niepieklo (11 June 1927 — 2 April 2014) was a German footballer who played as a forward for Borussia Dortmund and SG Castrop-Rauxel.
