= 1945–46 Oberliga =

Oberliga
- Season: 1945–46
- Champions: SG Wilmersdorf: 1. FC Saarbrücken; VfB Stuttgart
- Relegated: 28 clubs
- German champions: Not held
- Top goalscorer: Robert Schlienz (42 goals)

Map of the Allied occupation zones in Germany

The 1945–46 Oberliga was the inaugural season of the Oberliga, the first tier of the football league system in Allied-occupied Germany. The league operated in seven regional divisions, Berlin (four divisions), South and Southwest. For the second consecutive season no German championship was held. The competition would resume in 1948 with 1. FC Nürnberg taking out the first post-war championship.

In the British and Soviet occupation zone no Oberligas were organised. In the former the Oberliga Nord and Oberliga West commenced play in the 1947–48 season while, in the Soviet zone, the DDR-Oberliga was organised from 1949 onwards.

In the French occupation zone the Oberliga Südwest operated only in the north with the southern division established in the following season.

In the American occupation zone, with the approval of the US occupation authorities, the Oberliga Süd kicked off on 4 November 1945.

In post-Second World War Germany many clubs were forced to change their names or merge. This policy was particularly strongly enforced in the Soviet and French occupation zones but much more relaxed in the British and US one. In most cases clubs eventually reverted to their original names, especially after the formation of the Federal Republic of Germany in 1949.

== Oberliga Berlin ==
The 1945–46 season was the inaugural season of the league. The league champions of each division advanced to the championship round. At the end of the season the league was reduced from four divisions of nine teams each to a single division with twelve clubs.

=== Group A ===
Pos	Team	Pld	W	D	L	GF	GA	GD	Pts	Promotion, qualification or relegation
1	SG Wilmersdorf	16	13	3	0	67	8	+59	29	Qualified to championship round
2	SG Tempelhof	16	11	0	5	37	39	−2	22	
3	SG Spandau-Altstadt (R)	16	9	2	5	51	22	+29	20	Relegation to Amateurliga
4	SG Kreuzberg-Ost (R)	16	9	2	5	47	28	+19	20	Relegation to Amateurliga
5	SG Reinickendorf-West	16	9	2	5	54	33	+21	20	
6	SG Schöneberg-Nord (R)	16	6	3	7	30	25	+5	15	Relegation to Amateurliga
7	SG Hohenschönhausen (R)	16	4	1	11	28	64	−36	9	Relegation to Amateurliga
8	SG Reinickendorf-Ost (R)	16	3	0	13	30	78	−48	6	Relegation to Amateurliga
9	SG Friedrichsfelde (R)	16	1	1	14	23	70	−47	3	Relegation to Amateurliga

Source: RSSSF.com
Rules for classification: 1) Points;
(R) Relegated

=== Group B ===
Pos	Team	Pld	W	D	L	GF	GA	GD	Pts	Promotion, qualification or relegation
1	SG Mariendorf	16	13	1	2	71	32	+39	40	Qualified to championship round
2	SG Osloer Straße	16	10	2	4	48	23	+25	32	
3	SG Südring	16	10	1	5	41	28	+13	31	
4	SG Britz (R)	16	9	2	5	54	40	+14	29	Relegation to Amateurliga
5	SG Schillerpark (R)	16	6	2	8	27	38	−11	20	Relegation to Amateurliga
6	SG Stralau (R)	15	5	2	8	31	49	−18	17	Relegation to Amateurliga
7	SG Niederschönhausen (R)	16	5	2	9	35	40	−5	17	Relegation to Amateurliga
8	SG Grünau (R)	16	5	0	11	26	40	−14	15	Relegation to Amateurliga
9	SG Borsigwalde (R)	15	2	0	13	11	55	−44	6	Relegation to Amateurliga

Source: RSSSF.com
Rules for classification: 1) Points;
(R) Relegated

=== Group C ===
Pos	Team	Pld	W	D	L	GF	GA	GD	Pts	Promotion, qualification or relegation
1	SG Staaken	16	13	1	2	55	23	+32	40	Qualified to championship round
2	SG Charlottenburg	16	11	1	4	59	22	+37	34	
3	SG Köpenick	16	10	1	5	54	30	+24	31	
4	SG Prenzlauer Berg-Nord (R)	16	8	0	8	32	39	−7	24	Relegation to Amateurliga
5	SG Rixdorf (R)	16	7	1	8	35	40	−5	22	Relegation to Amateurliga
6	SG Tiergarten (R)	16	4	4	8	36	33	+3	16	Relegation to Amateurliga
7	SG Gesundbrunnen (R)	16	6	0	10	34	52	−18	18	Relegation to Amateurliga
8	SG Oberschöneweide (R)	16	3	4	9	26	43	−17	13	Relegation to Amateurliga
9	SG Lichtenberg-Süd (R)	16	3	2	11	25	74	−49	11	Relegation to Amateurliga

Source: RSSSF.com
Rules for classification: 1) Points;
(R) Relegated

=== Group D ===
Pos	Team	Pld	W	D	L	GF	GA	GD	Pts	Promotion, qualification or relegation
1	SG Prenzlauer Berg-West	16	12	2	2	63	34	+29	38	Qualified to championship round
2	SG Stadtmitte	16	9	4	3	36	32	+4	31	
3	SG Niederschöneweide (R)	16	5	5	6	30	31	−1	20	Relegation to Amateurliga
4	SG Lichtenberg-Nord	16	6	3	7	34	37	−3	21	
5	SG Adlershof (R)	16	6	3	7	43	52	−9	21	Relegation to Amateurliga
6	SG Nordbahn (R)	16	7	0	9	42	42	0	21	Relegation to Amateurliga
7	SG Johannisthal (R)	16	5	3	8	37	41	−4	18	Relegation to Amateurliga
8	SG Neukölln (R)	16	6	1	9	39	24	+15	19	Relegation to Amateurliga
9	SG Weißensee (R)	16	4	3	9	24	55	−31	15	Relegation to Amateurliga

Source: RSSSF.com
Rules for classification: 1) Points;
(R) Relegated

=== Championship ===
Pos	Team	Pld	W	D	L	GF	GA	GD	Pts
1	SG Wilmersdorf	6	5	0	1	28	11	+17	10
2	SG Prenzlauer Berg-West	6	3	1	2	17	13	+4	7
3	SG Staaken	6	3	1	2	17	13	+4	7
4	SG Mariendorf	6	0	0	6	8	33	−25	0

Source: RSSSF.com
Rules for classification: 1) Points;

== Oberliga Südwest ==
The 1945–46 season was the inaugural season of the league.

=== Northern group ===
Pos	Team	Pld	W	D	L	GF	GA	GD	Pts	Promotion, qualification or relegation
1	1. FC Saarbrücken	18	15	1	2	67	16	+51	31	Qualified to French occupation zone championship
2	1. FC Kaiserslautern	18	14	2	2	85	24	+61	30	
3	Borussia Neunkirchen	18	11	4	3	61	26	+35	26	
4	Wormatia Worms	18	8	4	6	45	30	+15	20	
5	VfR Frankenthal (R)	18	8	4	6	43	53	−10	20	Relegated to Landesliga
6	FK Pirmasens (R)	18	6	1	11	34	44	−10	13	Relegated to Landesliga
7	Phönix Ludwigshafen	18	3	5	10	27	51	−24	11	
8	1. FC Idar (R)	18	4	3	11	31	74	−43	11	Relegated to Landesliga
9	Hassia Bingen (R)	18	5	1	12	27	72	−45	11	Relegated to Landesliga
10	FSV Mainz 05	18	2	3	13	20	58	−38	7	

Source: RSSSF.com
Rules for classification: 1) Points;
(R) Relegated

=== Southern group ===
The southern division of the Oberliga Südwest commenced in 1946–47. In the 1945–46 season regional leagues were played with a final to determine which club would play the northern division winner in the French occupation zone championship:

Team 1	Score	Team 2
Fortuna Rastatt	5–0	VfL Konstanz

=== Final ===
The French occupation zone championship was decided in a set of finals between the northern and southern champions:

Team 1	Agg.	Team 2	1st leg	2nd leg
1. FC Saarbrücken	9–4	Fortuna Rastatt	5–0	4–4

== Oberliga Süd ==
The 1945–46 season was the inaugural season of the league. No team was relegated at the end of season as the league was expanded to 20 teams.

Pos	Team	Pld	W	D	L	GF	GA	GD	Pts
1	VfB Stuttgart	30	21	4	5	91	34	+57	46
2	1. FC Nürnberg	30	20	5	5	86	44	+42	45
3	Stuttgarter Kickers	30	17	8	5	88	51	+37	42
4	Schwaben Augsburg	30	16	7	7	55	36	+19	39
5	SV Waldhof Mannheim	30	16	7	7	68	45	+23	39
6	FC Bayern Munich	30	12	10	8	67	48	+19	34
7	FC Schweinfurt 05	30	14	5	11	55	49	+6	33
8	BC Augsburg	30	9	10	11	49	64	−15	28
9	TSV 1860 München	30	10	7	13	52	44	+8	27
10	FSV Frankfurt	30	8	10	12	44	62	−18	26
11	Eintracht Frankfurt	30	9	7	14	71	75	−4	25
12	Kickers Offenbach	30	10	4	16	60	72	−12	24
13	SpVgg Fürth	30	8	6	16	46	69	−23	22
14	VfR Mannheim	30	6	7	17	41	74	−33	19
15	Phönix Karlsruhe	30	6	6	18	54	90	−36	18
16	Karlsruher FV	30	3	7	20	33	112	−79	13

Source: RSSSF.com
Rules for classification: 1) Points;

== German championship ==
For the second consecutive season, no German championship was held. The competition would resume the following season.
