= 1946–47 Oberliga =

Oberliga
- Season: 1946–47
- Champions: SG Charlottenburg: 1. FC Kaiserslautern; 1. FC Nürnberg
- Relegated: SG Lichtenberg-Nord SG Stadtmitte SG Tempelhof BC Augsburg: 1. FC Bamberg; Karlsruher FV Phönix Karlsruhe
- German champions: Not held
- Top goalscorer: Hans Berndt (53 goals)

Map of the Allied occupation zones in Germany

The 1946–47 Oberliga was the second season of the Oberliga, the first tier of the football league system in Allied-occupied Germany. The league operated in four regional divisions, Berlin, South and Southwest (north and south). For the third consecutive season no German championship was held but the competition would resume the following year with 1. FC Nürnberg taking out the first post-war championship.

In the British and Soviet occupation zone no Oberligas were organised. In the former the Oberliga Nord and Oberliga West commenced play in the following season while, in the Soviet zone, the DDR-Oberliga was organised from 1949 onwards. In the Soviet zone a championship was organised from the following season, while the first edition of the British occupation zone championship in 1947 was contested by eight teams and won by Hamburger SV.

In the French occupation zone the Oberliga Südwest operated in two regional divisions, north and south, with a championship final at the end of season.

In post-Second World War Germany many clubs were forced to change their names or merge. This policy was particularly strongly enforced in the Soviet and French occupation zones but much more relaxed in the British and US one. In most cases clubs eventually reverted to their original names, especially after the formation of the Federal Republic of Germany in 1949.

== Oberliga Berlin ==
The 1946–47 season saw the league reduced from four divisions of nine clubs each to a single division of twelve clubs.

Pos	Team	Pld	W	D	L	GF	GA	GD	Pts	Promotion, qualification or relegation
1	SG Charlottenburg	22	18	1	3	89	24	+65	37	
2	SG Wilmersdorf	22	16	2	4	78	30	+48	34	
3	SG Reinickendorf-West	22	10	6	6	58	48	+10	26	
4	SG Prenzlauer Berg-West	22	9	4	9	56	47	+9	22	
5	SG Staaken	22	9	4	9	55	69	−14	22	
6	SG Mariendorf	22	8	5	9	34	50	−16	21	
7	SG Osloer Straße	22	9	3	10	35	56	−21	21	
8	SG Köpenick	22	8	4	10	46	41	+5	20	
9	SG Südring	22	9	2	11	59	66	−7	20	
10	SG Lichtenberg-Nord (R)	22	8	3	11	46	51	−5	19	Relegation to Amateurliga
11	SG Stadtmitte (R)	22	6	1	15	34	61	−27	13	Relegation to Amateurliga
12	SG Tempelhof (R)	22	4	1	17	33	80	−47	9	Relegation to Amateurliga

Source: RSSSF.com
Rules for classification: 1) Points;
(R) Relegated

== Oberliga Südwest ==
=== Northern group ===
The 1946–47 season saw two new clubs promoted to the league, TuS Neuendorf and FSV Kürenz.

Pos	Team	Pld	W	D	L	GF	GA	GD	Pts	Promotion, qualification or relegation
1	1. FC Kaiserslautern	14	11	1	2	75	15	+60	23	Qualified to French occupation zone championship
2	Wormatia Worms	14	8	1	5	28	25	+3	17	
3	1. FC Saarbrücken	14	7	2	5	30	20	+10	16	
4	FSV Mainz 05	14	6	4	4	28	19	+9	16	
5	Phönix Ludwigshafen	14	6	1	7	25	31	−6	13	
6	Borussia Neunkirchen	14	4	4	6	37	26	+11	12	
7	TuS Neuendorf	14	5	2	7	23	24	−1	12	
8	FSV Kürenz	14	1	1	12	9	95	−86	3	

Source: RSSSF.com
Rules for classification: 1) Points;

=== Southern group ===
The 1946–47 season saw four new clubs promoted to the league, SSV Reutlingen, SG Friedrichshafen, VfL Schwenningen and SV Biberach.

Pos	Team	Pld	W	D	L	GF	GA	GD	Pts	Promotion, qualification or relegation
1	VfL Konstanz	14	8	4	2	27	19	+8	20	Qualified to French occupation zone championship
2	SSV Reutlingen	14	8	1	5	39	24	+15	17	
3	SG Friedrichshafen	14	6	4	4	28	23	+5	16	
4	SpVgg Offenburg	14	5	5	4	22	23	−1	15	
5	Fortuna Rastatt	14	5	4	5	23	22	+1	14	
6	VfL Schwenningen	14	5	3	6	29	28	+1	13	
7	VfL Freiburg	14	5	2	7	32	30	+2	12	
8	SV Biberach	14	1	2	11	28	59	−31	4	

Source: RSSSF.com
Rules for classification: 1) Points;

=== Finals ===
The winners of the two regional divisions of the Oberliga Südwest played a final to determine the league champion:

Team 1	Agg.	Team 2	1st leg	2nd leg
1. FC Kaiserslautern	16–5	VfL Konstanz	8–1	8–4

== Oberliga Süd ==
The 1946–47 season saw four new clubs promoted to the league, Viktoria Aschaffenburg, VfL Neckarau, 1. FC Bamberg and TSG Ulm 1846.

Pos	Team	Pld	W	D	L	GF	GA	GD	Pts	Promotion, qualification or relegation
1	1. FC Nürnberg	38	28	6	4	108	31	+77	62	
2	SV Waldhof Mannheim	43	27	5	11	74	54	+20	59	
3	Eintracht Frankfurt	38	17	14	7	72	50	+22	48	
4	TSV 1860 München	38	18	8	12	67	50	+17	44	
5	Kickers Offenbach	38	16	11	11	76	58	+18	43	
6	VfB Stuttgart	38	17	9	12	64	58	+6	43	
7	Stuttgarter Kickers	38	18	6	14	90	56	+34	42	
8	Schwaben Augsburg	38	17	7	14	75	51	+24	41	
9	FC Schweinfurt 05	38	14	12	12	56	46	+10	40	
10	SpVgg Fürth	38	14	10	14	56	57	−1	38	
11	FC Bayern Munich	38	12	12	14	75	56	+19	36	
12	VfR Mannheim	38	16	3	19	50	62	−12	35	
13	TSG Ulm 1846	38	13	8	17	56	80	−24	34	
14	FSV Frankfurt	38	9	15	14	35	50	−15	33	
15	Viktoria Aschaffenburg	38	14	5	19	68	111	−43	33	
16	VfL Neckarau	38	12	8	18	74	83	−9	32	
17	BC Augsburg (R)	38	14	2	22	62	89	−27	30	Relegation to Landesligas
18	1. FC Bamberg (R)	38	12	4	22	44	75	−31	28	Relegation to Landesligas
19	Karlsruher FV (R)	38	10	7	21	48	84	−36	27	Relegation to Landesligas
20	Phönix Karlsruhe (R)	38	9	6	23	46	95	−49	24	Relegation to Landesligas

Source: RSSSF.com
Rules for classification: 1) Points;
(R) Relegated

== German championship ==
No 1947 German championship was held but attempts were made to stage one, scheduled to consist of eight teams, three each from the US and British zone and one each from the French and Soviet one. Difficulties with the scheduling resulted in a reduced format of only four teams planned to consist of Hamburger SV playing SG Charlottenburg and 1. FC Nürnberg playing 1. FC Kaiserslautern in the semi-finals on 10 August 1947, with the final planned for 24 August 1947. After the southern clubs declined to participate the competition was cancelled altogether.
