= Oberliga (football) =

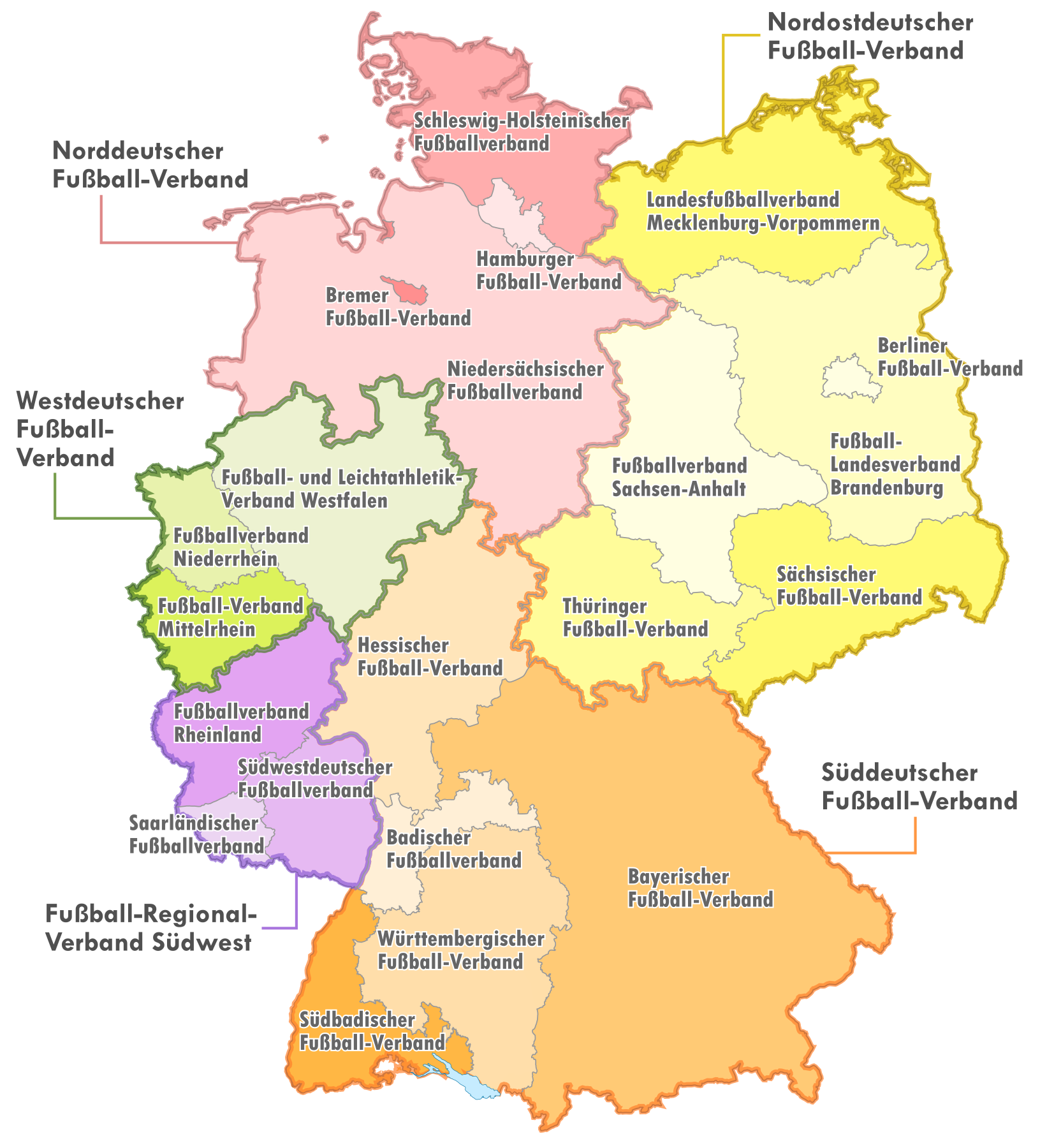
- Organising bodies: DFB state associations
- Founded: 1945; 81 years ago
- Country: Germany
- Leagues: 14
- Level on pyramid: 1 (1945–1963); 3 (1974–1994); 4 (1994–2008); 5 (2008–present)
- Promotion to: Regionalliga
- Relegation to: Verbandsliga, Landesliga
- Current: 2026–27 Oberliga

The Oberliga (German: [ˈoːbɐˌliːɡa], "Upper League"; plural: Oberligen) is the fifth tier of the German football league system. Before the introduction of the 3. Liga in 2008, it was the fourth tier. At the end of the 2011–12 season, the number of Oberligas was increased from eleven to fourteen.

With the exception of the Nazi-era Gauliga, the term Oberliga (equivalent to Premier League in English) was used prior to the formation of the Bundesliga in 1963 for first-division leagues in West Germany. Between 1978–94 the term Amateuroberliga was used for third-tier leagues, which were then the highest level of amateur play in the country. The current usage of the designation Oberliga was introduced in 1994. In East Germany a separate league structure was in place from 1948–1990 and the top flight division there was known as the DDR-Oberliga.

== Pre-Bundesliga Oberligen ==
From the end of the Second World War until the formation of the Bundesliga in 1963 there were five regional Oberligen:

- Oberliga Berlin
- Oberliga Nord
- Oberliga West
- Oberliga Südwest
- Oberliga Süd

Based on criteria outlined by the German association in October 1962 an evaluation system covering the last 12 seasons was established through which the sixteen clubs from these five leagues were established which were to form the new nationwide first division Bundesliga, with the others going to the new second tier Regionalligen.

=== Champions of Pre-Bundesliga Oberligen ===
Year	Nord	West	Südwest	Süd	Berlin
1946	–	–	1. FC Saarbrücken	VfB Stuttgart	SG Wilmersdorf
1947	–	–	1. FC Kaiserslautern	1. FC Nürnberg	SG Charlottenburg
1948	Hamburger SV	Borussia Dortmund	1. FC Kaiserslautern	1. FC Nürnberg	Union Oberschöneweide
1949	Hamburger SV	Borussia Dortmund	1. FC Kaiserslautern	Kickers Offenbach	Berliner SV 92
1950	Hamburger SV	Borussia Dortmund	1. FC Kaiserslautern	SpVgg Fürth	Tennis Borussia Berlin
1951	Hamburger SV	FC Schalke 04	1. FC Kaiserslautern	1. FC Nürnberg	Tennis Borussia Berlin
1952	Hamburger SV	Rot-Weiss Essen	1. FC Saarbrücken	VfB Stuttgart	Tennis Borussia Berlin
1953	Hamburger SV	Borussia Dortmund	1. FC Kaiserslautern	Eintracht Frankfurt	SC Union 06 Berlin
1954	Hannover 96	1. FC Köln	1. FC Kaiserslautern	VfB Stuttgart	Berliner SV 92
1955	Hamburger SV	Rot-Weiss Essen	1. FC Kaiserslautern	Kickers Offenbach	BFC Viktoria 1889
1956	Hamburger SV	Borussia Dortmund	1. FC Kaiserslautern	Karlsruher SC	BFC Viktoria 1889
1957	Hamburger SV	Borussia Dortmund	1. FC Kaiserslautern	1. FC Nürnberg	Hertha BSC
1958	Hamburger SV	FC Schalke 04	FK Pirmasens	Karlsruher SC	Tennis Borussia Berlin
1959	Hamburger SV	Westfalia Herne	FK Pirmasens	Eintracht Frankfurt	SC Tasmania 1900 Berlin
1960	Hamburger SV	1. FC Köln	FK Pirmasens	Karlsruher SC	SC Tasmania 1900 Berlin
1961	Hamburger SV	1. FC Köln	1. FC Saarbrücken	1. FC Nürnberg	Hertha BSC
1962	Hamburger SV	1. FC Köln	Borussia Neunkirchen	1. FC Nürnberg	SC Tasmania 1900 Berlin
1963	Hamburger SV	1. FC Köln	1. FC Kaiserslautern	TSV 1860 München	Hertha BSC

=== 2. Oberliga ===
Below the Oberliga the 2. Oberliga existed from 1949 to 1963 as the second tier in West Germany, except in Northern Germany and West Berlin where this level was never introduced. The 2. Oberligas were:

- 2. Oberliga Süd
- 2. Oberliga Südwest
- 2. Oberliga West

== Overview ==
Oberliga champions are usually promoted to Regionalliga which is directly below the 3. Liga. The Oberliga Nordost has two divisions ("Süd" and "Nord").

If the champion of an Oberliga is the B-team of a club which already has a team in the Regionalliga, or which has a team which will be relegated to the Regionalliga, the B-team cannot be promoted, and the next highest qualified team will be promoted instead.

There are fourteen "Oberligen", based on states and regions of Germany.

== Promotion from the Oberligas to the 2nd Bundesliga ==
From 1974 to 1994, the Oberligas, originally called 1st Amateurliga, were set right below the two 2nd Bundesligas, North and South. Originally there was 15 Amateurligas which were reduced to 8 Oberligas in 1978. From 1981 the 2nd Bundesliga was reduced to one single league. Because there always were more Oberliga champions then promotion spots, these clubs had to determine the promoted teams by the way of a promotion play-off to the 2. Bundesliga, called "Aufstiegsrunde zur 2. Bundesliga".

== Short history of the Oberligas ==
Since 2012–13 fourteen leagues exist on Oberliga level, increased from eleven the previous season:

=== Oberliga Baden-Württemberg ===
The Oberliga Baden-Württemberg was formed in 1978 to provide a single-division 3rd tier league for the state of Baden-Württemberg. Previously, the clubs in the state had played in four separate Amateurligas: Nordwürttemberg, Schwarzwald-Bodensee, Nordbaden and Südbaden. Two of those were merged, the Amateurligas Nordwürttemberg and Schwarzwald-Bodensee to form the Verbandsliga Württemberg.

Feeder leagues to the Oberliga Baden-Württemberg

- Verbandsliga Nordbaden
- Verbandsliga Südbaden
- Verbandsliga Württemberg

=== Bayernliga ===
The Bayernliga was formed in 1945. In 1946–47, 1947–48 and from 1953–54 till 1962–63 it was split in a northern and a southern division. From 1963 to 2012 it played in the single division format. Since 2012 it again plays with a northern and a southern division.

Feeder leagues to the Bayernliga

- Landesliga Bayern-Nordost
- Landesliga Bayern-Nordwest
- Landesliga Bayern-Mitte
- Landesliga Bayern-Südost
- Landesliga Bayern-Südwest

=== Bremen-Liga ===
The Bremen-Liga was established in 2008.

Feeder league to the Bremen-Liga

- Landesliga Bremen

=== Oberliga Hamburg ===
The Oberliga Hamburg was established in 2008.

Feeder leagues to the Oberliga Hamburg

- Landesliga Hamburg-Hammonia
- Landesliga Hamburg-Hansa

=== Hessenliga ===
The Hessenliga was formed in 1945. In its first two seasons, 1945/46 and 1946/47 it played in two separate divisions, east and west. Since then it has been a single league and is the oldest Oberliga to operate continuously in this format.

Feeder leagues to the Hessenliga

- Verbandsliga Hessen-Nord
- Verbandsliga Hessen-Mitte
- Verbandsliga Hessen-Süd

=== Oberliga Mittelrhein ===
The Oberliga Mittelrhein was elevated to Oberliga status in 2012 after the disbanding of the NRW-Liga which it previously had served.

Feeder leagues to the Oberliga Mittelrhein

- Landesliga Mittelrhein Staffel 1
- Landesliga Mittelrhein Staffel 2

=== Oberliga Niederrhein ===
The Oberliga Niederrhein was elevated to Oberliga status in 2012 after the disbanding of the NRW-Liga which it previously had served.

Feeder leagues to the Oberliga Niederrhein

- Landesliga Niederrhein Gruppe 1
- Landesliga Niederrhein Gruppe 2

=== Oberliga Niedersachsen ===
The Oberliga Niedersachsen was established in 2008, initially in two regional divisions, in 2010 reduced to a single division league, and reverted to two divisions in 2020 for one season only.

Feeder leagues to the Oberliga Niedersachsen

- Landesliga Hannover
- Landesliga Weser-Ems
- Landesliga Braunschweig
- Landesliga Lüneburg

=== NOFV-Oberliga ===
The NOFV-Oberliga was established in 1991 after the German reunification. It covers former East Germany and the city of Berlin. Originally having three divisions, in 1994 the NOFV-Oberliga Mitte ceased to continue and its clubs were split between the other two divisions, NOFV-Oberliga Nord and NOFV-Oberliga Süd.

Feeder leagues to the NOFV-Oberliga

- Berlin-Liga
- Brandenburg-Liga
- Verbandsliga Mecklenburg-Vorpommern
- Landesliga Sachsen
- Verbandsliga Sachsen-Anhalt
- Verbandsliga Thüringen

The participating teams are redistributed between the northern and the southern division based on geographical needs. If possible, teams from Berlin, Brandenburg and Mecklenburg-Vorpommern promote to the northern division, whereas teams from Saxony, Saxony-Anhalt and Thuringia promote to the southern division. In some seasons, the northern and southern divisions cover teams from northern Saxony-Anhalt and southern Brandenburg respectively.

=== Oberliga Rheinland-Pfalz/Saar ===
The Oberliga Rheinland-Pfalz/Saar, named Oberliga Südwest until 2012, was formed in 1978 to provide a single-division third tier league for the two states Saarland and Rhineland-Palatinate. Previously, the clubs that make up this Oberliga played in three separate leagues: the Amateurligas Südwest, Saarland, and Rheinland. The league split into two divisions in 2020 for one season only.

Feeder leagues to the Oberliga Südwest

- Verbandsliga Südwest
- Saarlandliga
- Verbandsliga Rheinland

=== Oberliga Schleswig-Holstein ===
The Oberliga Schleswig-Holstein was established in 2008 as the Schleswig-Holstein-Liga and took its present name in 2017. It also split into two divisions in 2020 for almost one year only.

Feeder leagues to the Schleswig-Holstein-Liga until 2017

- Verbandsliga Schleswig-Holstein-Nord-West
- Verbandsliga Schleswig-Holstein-Nord-Ost
- Verbandsliga Schleswig-Holstein-Süd-West
- Verbandsliga Schleswig-Holstein-Süd-Ost

Feeder leagues to the Oberliga Schleswig-Holstein after 2017

- Landesliga Schleswig
- Landesliga Holstein
- Landesliga Mitte (2020–2023)

=== Oberliga Westfalen ===
The Oberliga Westfalen was formed in 1978 to provide a single-division for the Westphalia region. It was disestablished in 2008 with the introduction of the NRW-Liga but reestablished in 2012.

Feeder leagues to the Oberliga Westfalen

- Westfalenliga Staffel 1
- Westfalenliga Staffel 2

== Defunct Oberligas ==
The Amateur-Oberliga Berlin was established in 1974 to accommodate the majority of clubs of the Regionalliga Berlin when this league ceased to exist. With the German reunification in 1991 the Oberliga Berlin ceased to exist and its clubs were spread between the NOFV-Oberliga Nord and the NOFV-Oberliga Mitte. The highest level of league play in Berlin is now the Berlin-Liga.

The NOFV-Oberliga Mitte existed from the German reunification in 1991 until its dissolution in 1994. Its clubs were moved to either the NOFV-Oberliga Nord or the NOFV-Oberliga Süd.

The Oberliga Niedersachsen/Bremen existed from 1994 till 2004 as a replacement for the Oberliga Nord. With the reestablishment of the Oberliga Nord, the Oberliga Niedersachsen/Bremen ceased to exist.

The Oberliga Hamburg/Schleswig-Holstein existed from 1994 till 2004 as a replacement for the Oberliga Nord. With the reestablishment of the Oberliga Nord, the Oberliga Hamburg/Schleswig-Holstein ceased to exist.

The Oberliga Nordrhein was established in 1978 as a new joint amateur top flight for the best teams of the Verbandsliga Niederrhein and the Verbandsliga Mittelrhein. It was replaced by the NRW-Liga in 2008, which is a merger of the Oberliga Nordrhein and the Oberliga Westfalen.

The NRW-Liga was formed in 2008 and disbanded again in 2012 and replaced by the Oberliga Westfalen, the Oberliga Mittelrhein and the Oberliga Niederrhein.

The Oberliga Nord was formed in 1974 to form the highest playing level for the states of Lower Saxony, Schleswig-Holstein, Hamburg and Bremen. As such it was a continuation of the old Regionalliga Nord which was superseded by the 2. Bundesliga Nord in 1974. It stopped operating in 1994 when the Regionalliga Nord was reformed, now as the third tier of the German football league system. It was replaced by the Oberliga Hamburg/Schleswig-Holstein and the Oberliga Niedersachsen/Bremen. In 2004 the Oberliga Nord was re-established to replace these two leagues. To add to the confusion, the Oberliga Nord again ceased to exist after the 2007–08 season with the establishment of the 3. Liga.

== Oberliga timeline ==
Source:"The German football leagues: Bundesliga to Verbandsliga". Das deutsche Archiv.

Evolution of the Oberligen (West Germany)

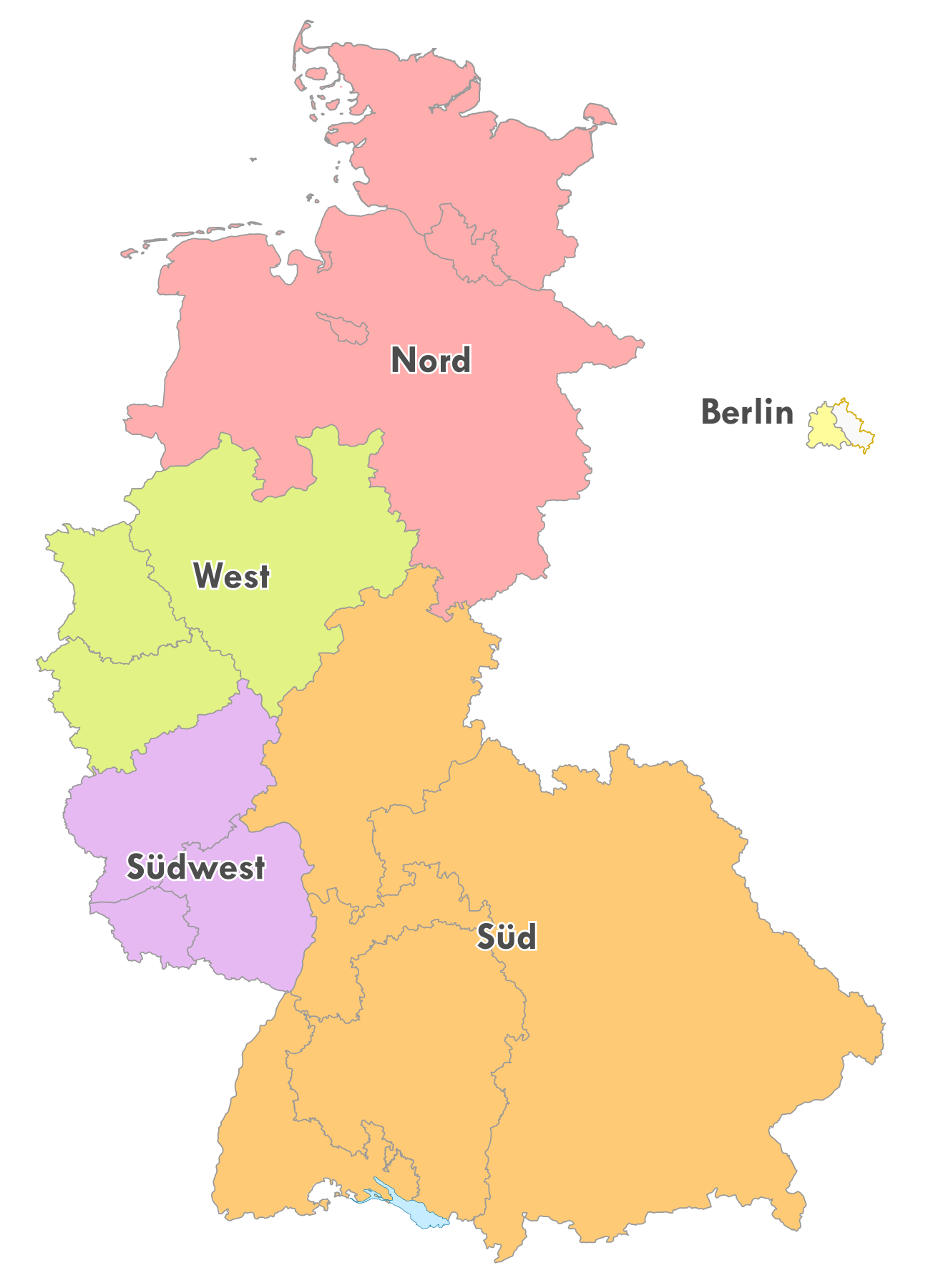
Map of the five first-tier Oberligen (1951-1963)

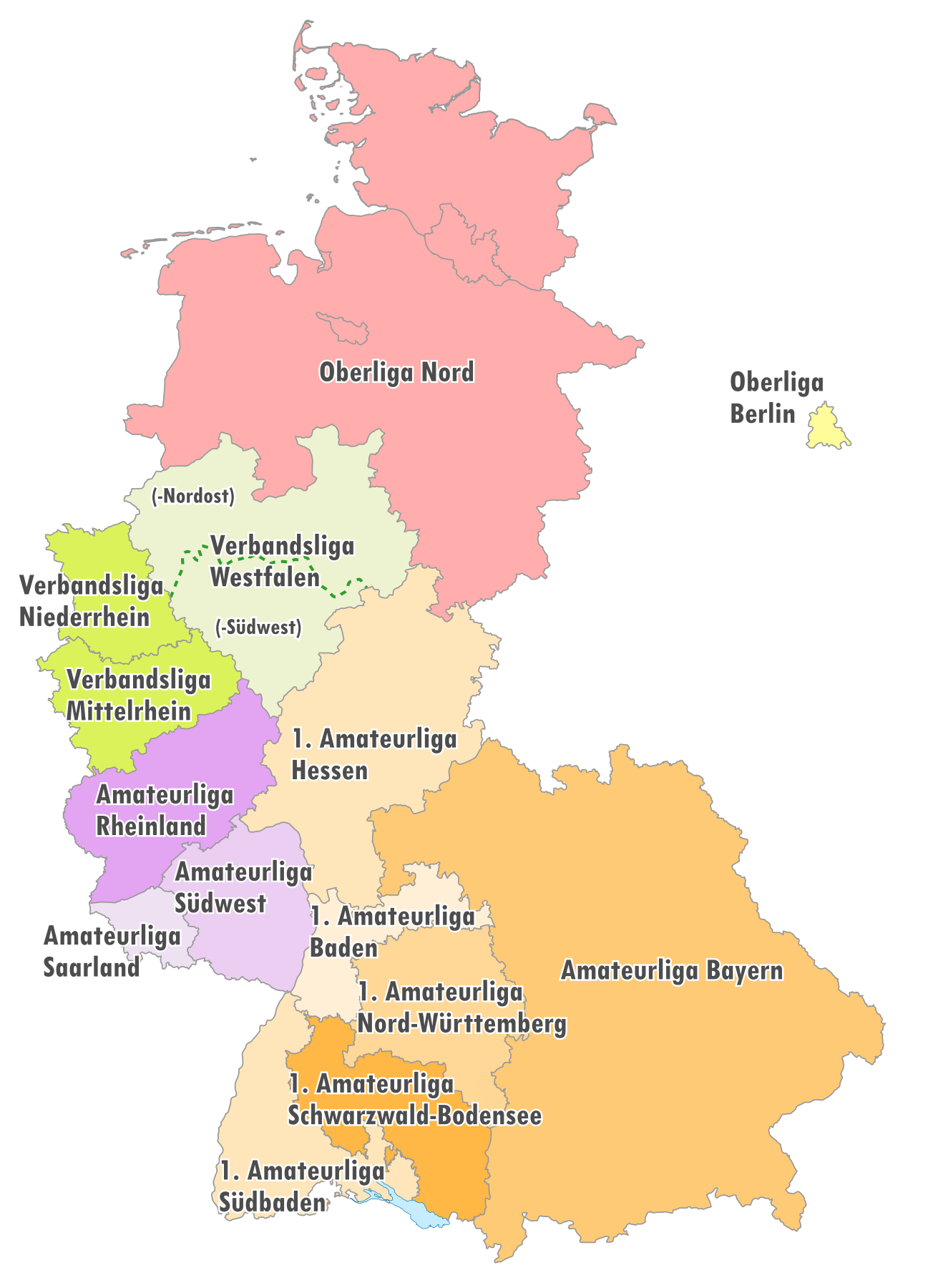
Map of the two Oberligen, and the other German third-tier championships (1974-1978)

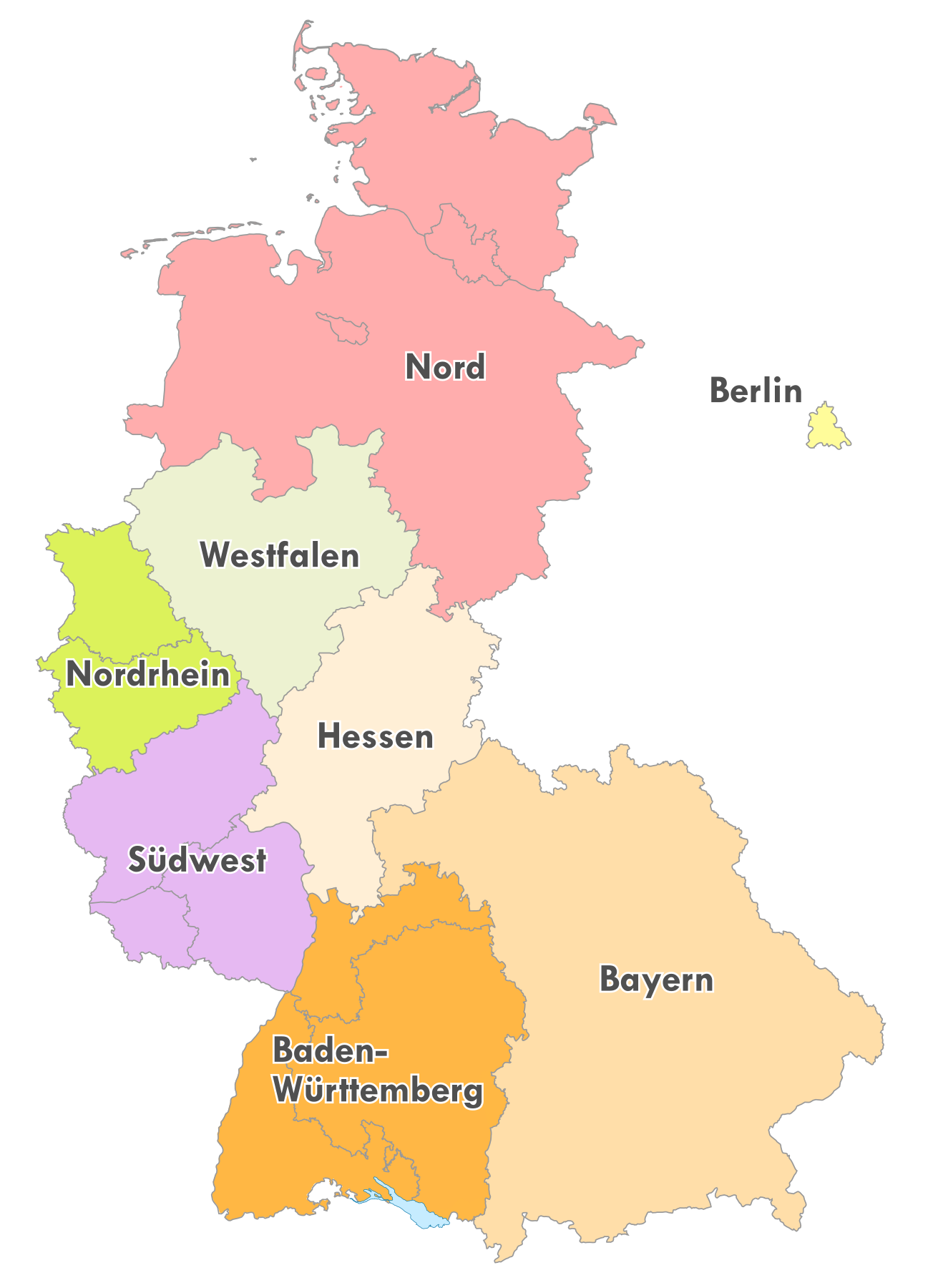
Map of the eight third-tier Oberligen (1978-1991)

Evolution of the Oberligen (Germany post-reunification)

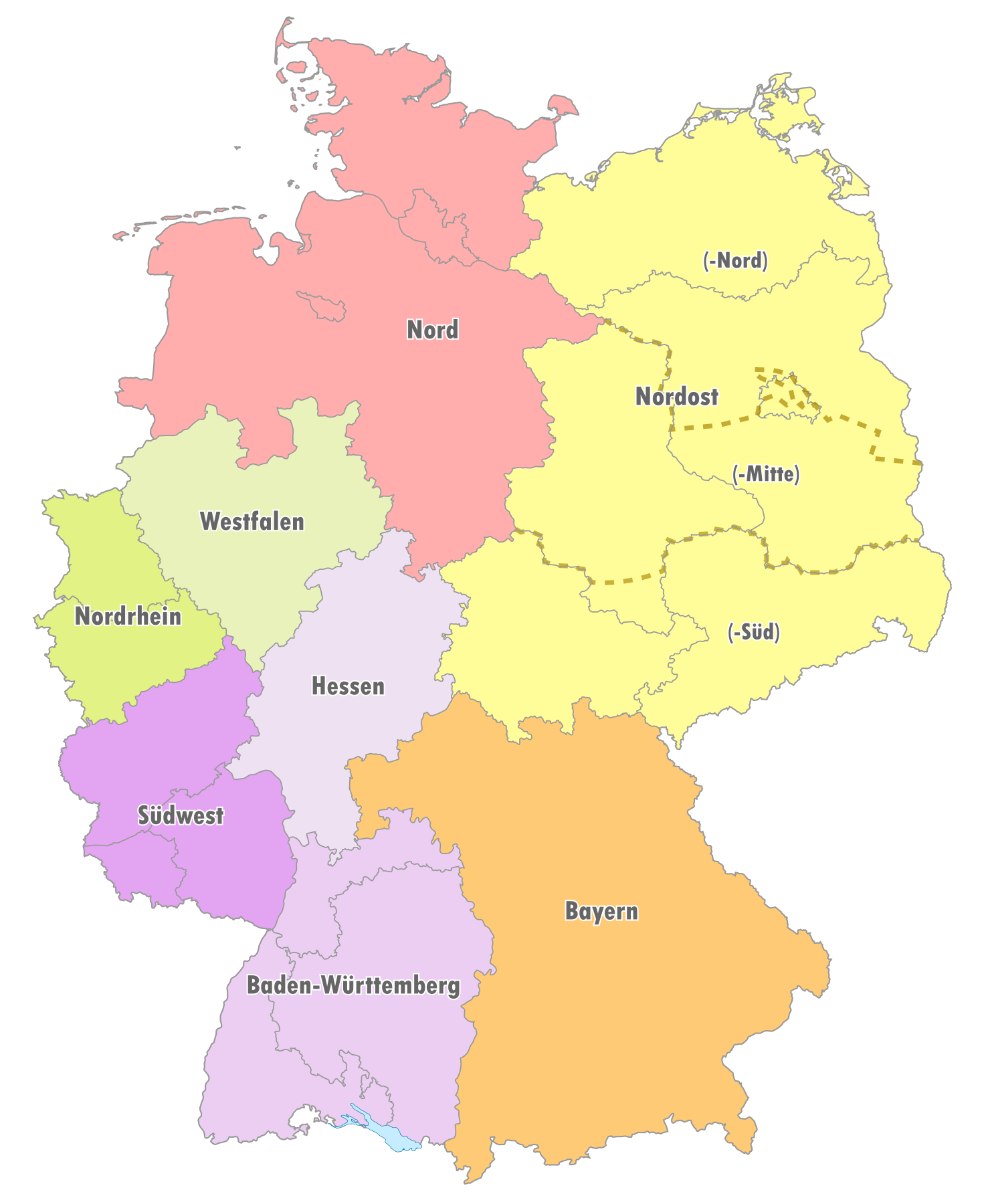
Map of the ten third-tier Oberligen (1991-1994)

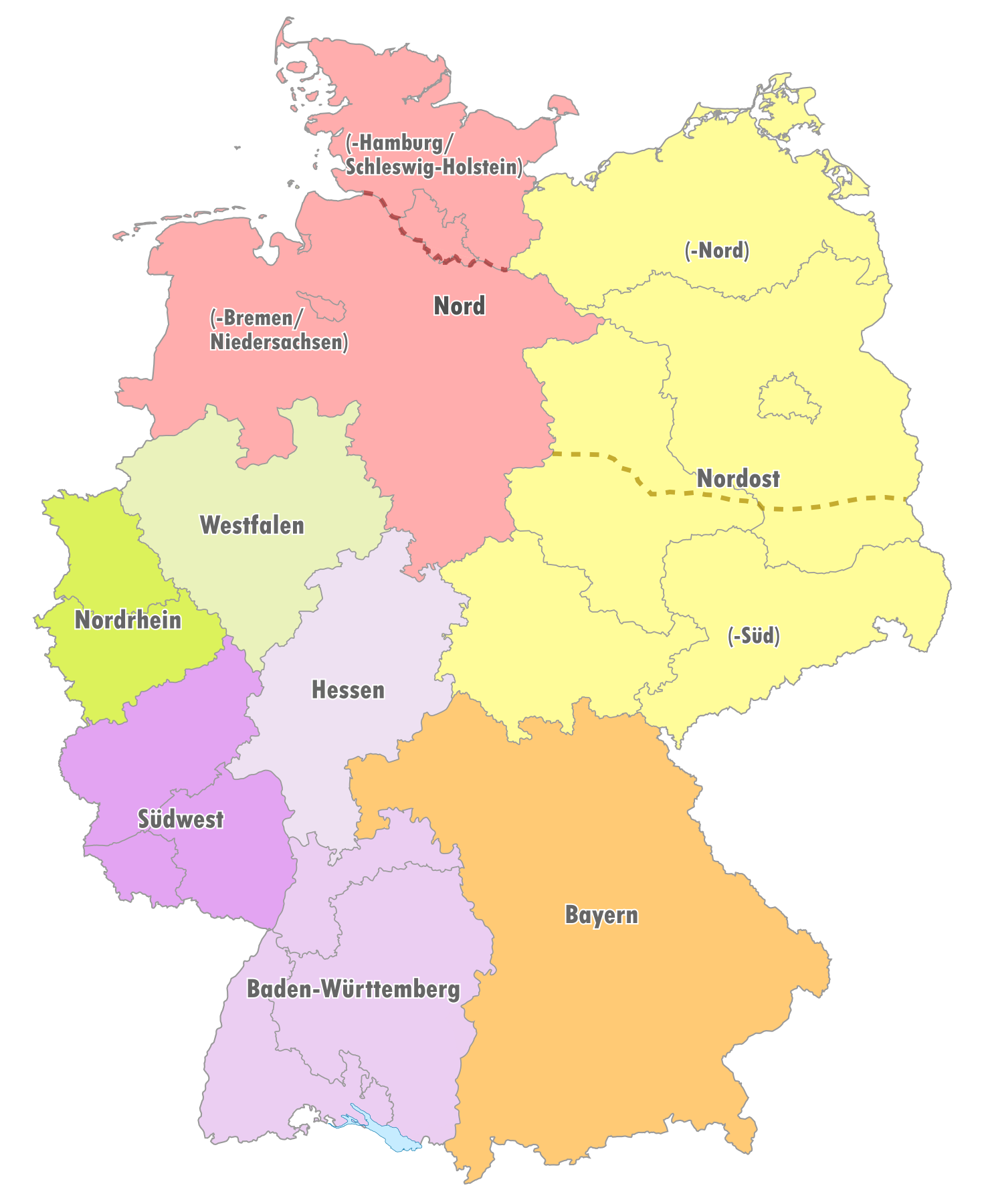
Map of the ten fourth-tier Oberligen (1994-2004)

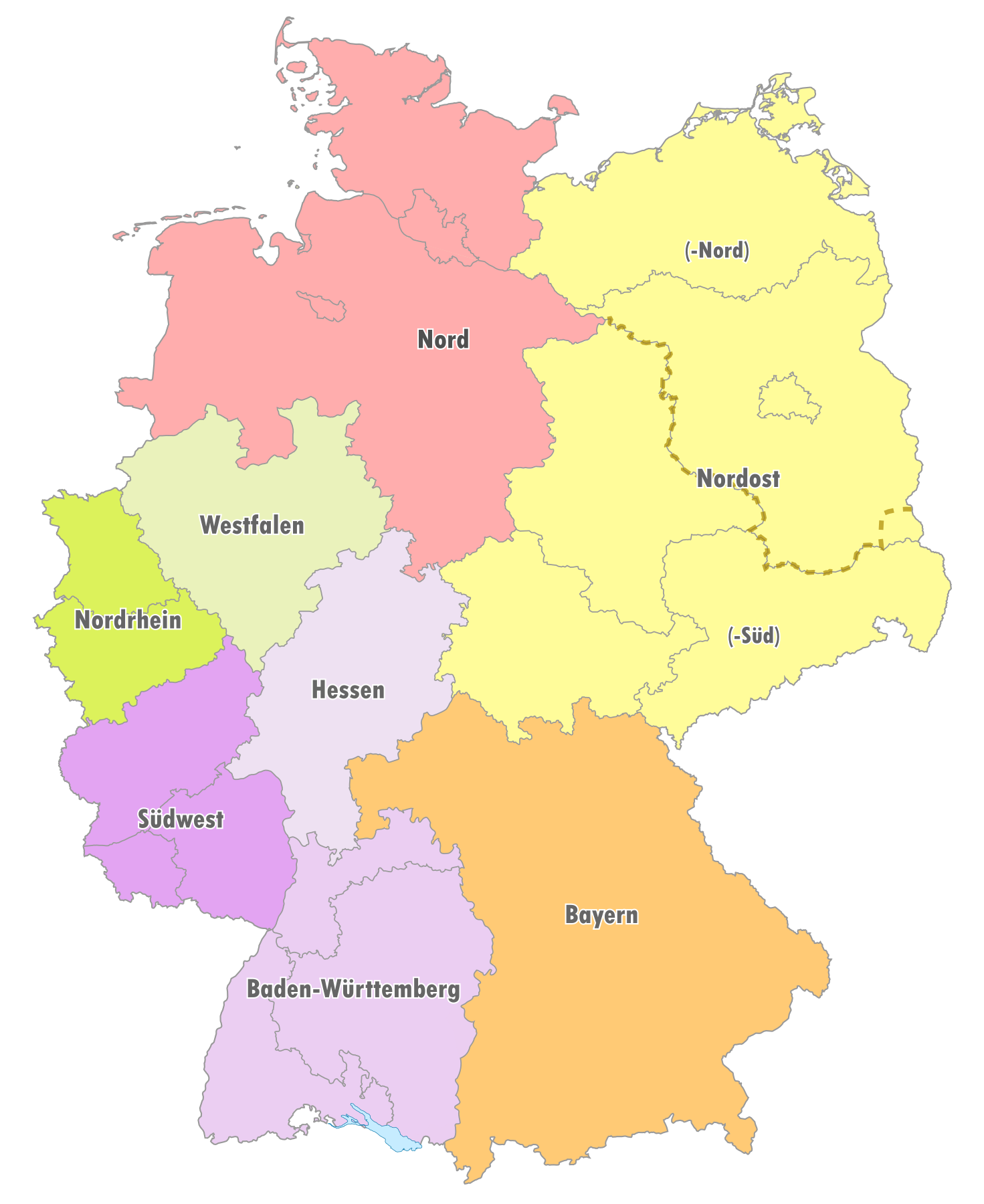
Map of the nine fourth-tier Oberligen (2004-2008)

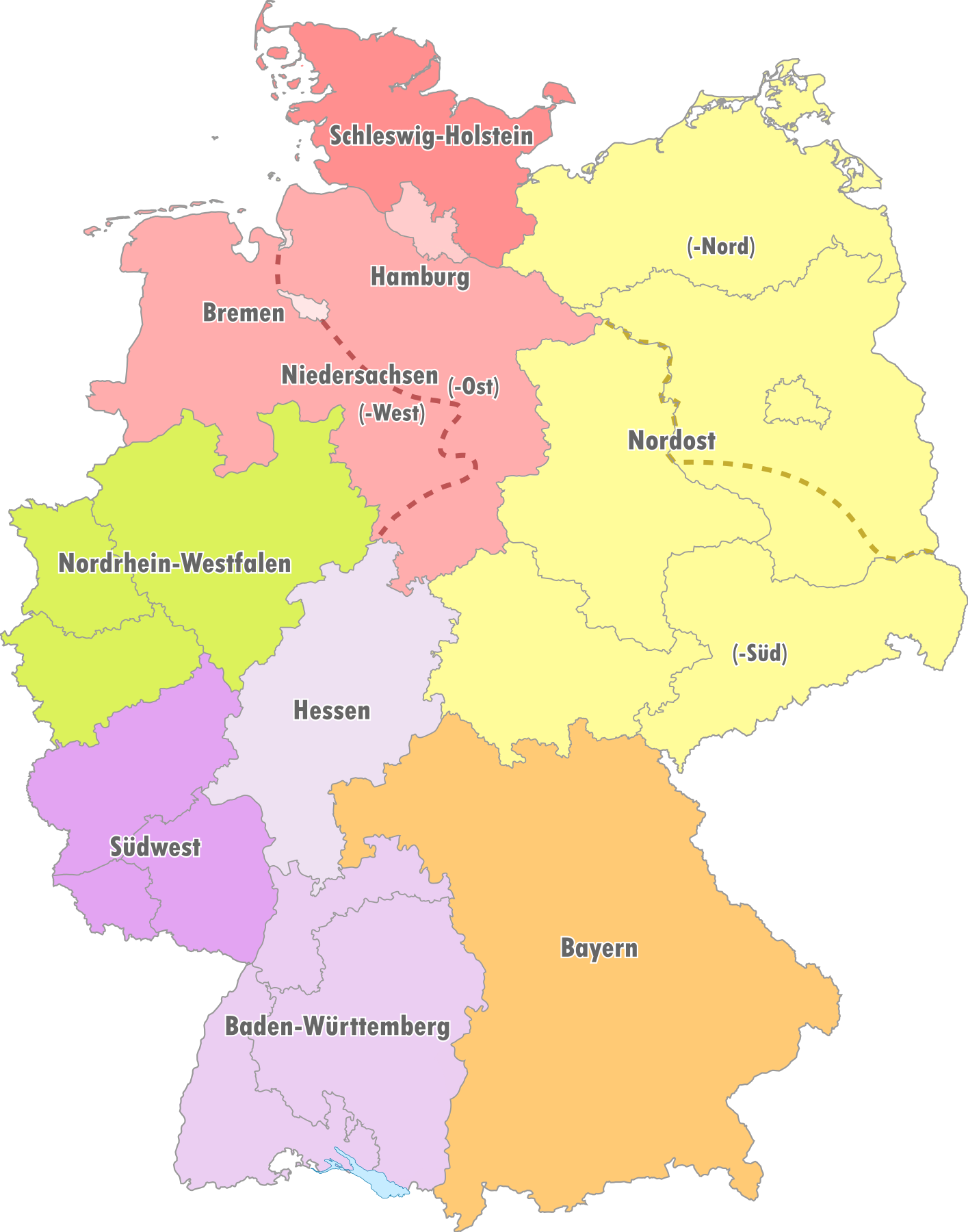
Map of the twelve fifth-tier Oberligen (2008-2010)

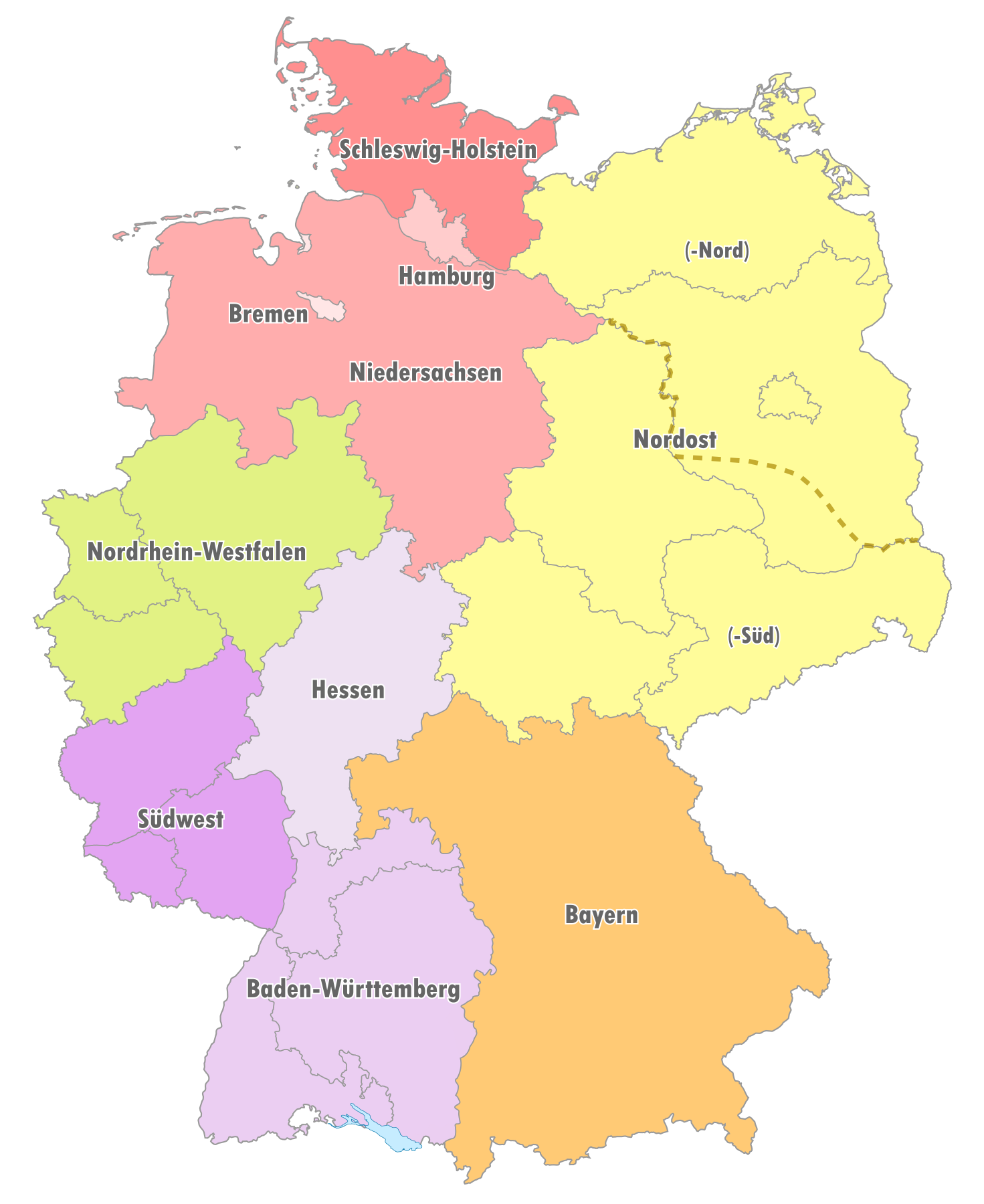
Map of the eleven fifth-tier Oberligen (2010-2012)

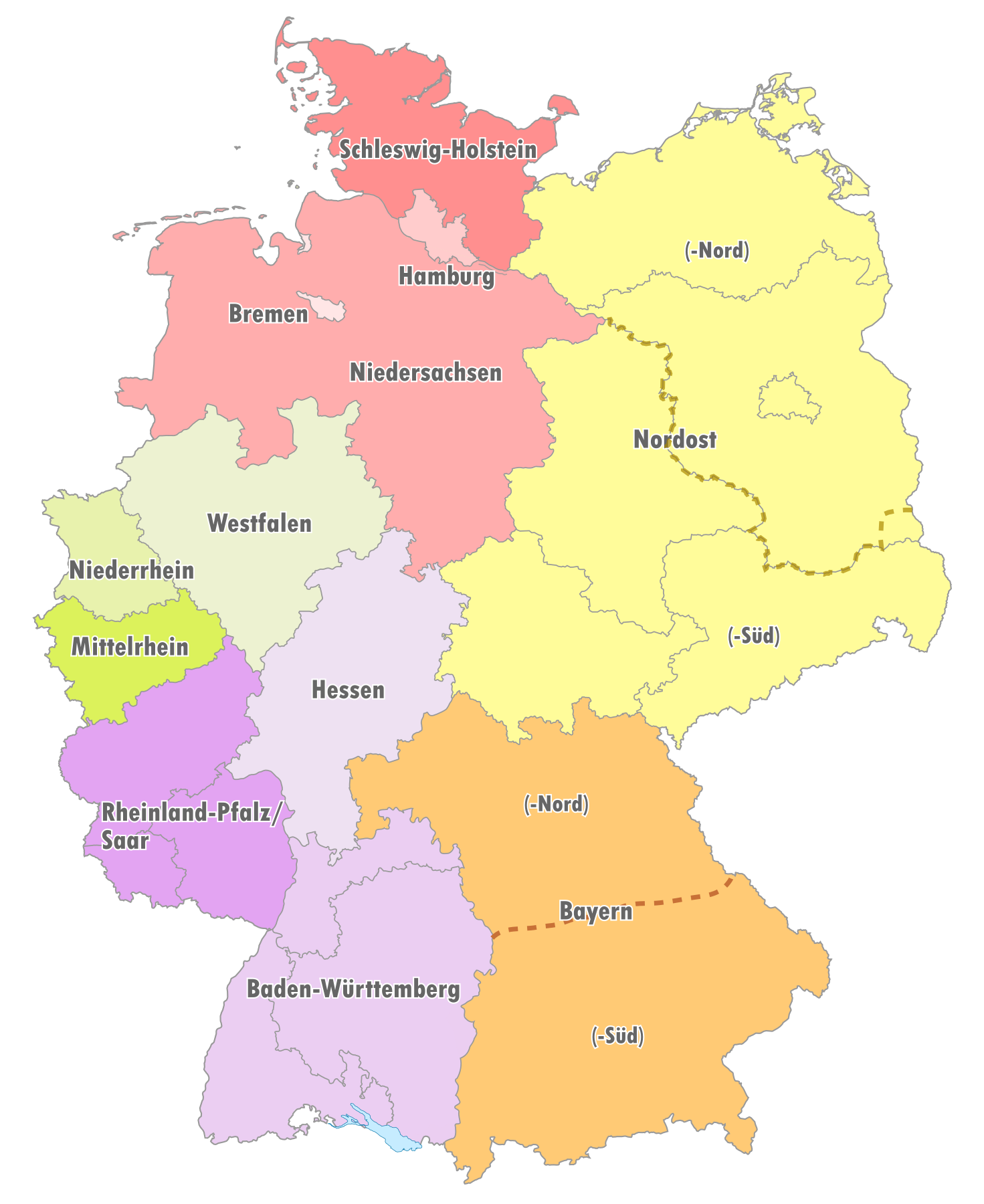
Map of the fourteen current fifth-tier Oberligen (since 2012)
