= Oberliga Südwest =

Oberliga Südwest may refer to:

- Association football leagues in Southwestern Germany:
  - Oberliga Südwest (1945–63), a defunct tier one league existing from 1945 to 1963.
  - Oberliga Rheinland-Pfalz/Saar, a tier five league named Oberliga Südwest from 1978 to 2012
