= Lufthansa SG Berlin =

German football club

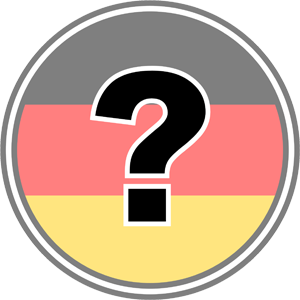
- Full name: Lufthansa Sportgemeinschaft Berlin e.V.
- Founded: 1931
- Dissolved: 1945
- Ground: Monumentenstraße Schöneberg
Home colours	Away colours

Lufthansa SG Berlin was a German association football club based in the Schöneberg district of Berlin. It was established in 1931 as the worker's side of the national airline Deutschen Lufthansa Berlin and was active through to the end of World War II.

== History ==
The club was renamed Lufthansa Sportverein in 1931 before again taking on the name Lufthansa SG sometime in 1935. They took part in the promotion round for the Gauliga Berlin-Brandenburg (I) in 1937, but did not advance after finishing sixth out of a group of seven qualifiers. The team had more success in their next attempt in 1939 when they finished 1st in the promotion round, and alongside Polizei SV Berlin, advanced to Gauliga play.

They performed well in their debut season there, finishing 2nd in Staffel A, but slipped in their next two campaigns. In 1942, SG took part in play for the Tschammerspokal, predecessor to today's DFB-Pokal (German Cup), where they went out in the first round to Blau-Weiß 90 Berlin. They earned another 2nd place Gauliga finish in 1943.

Manpower shortages late in the war led to the formation of wartime sports clubs known as Kriegspielgemeinschaft that combined two or more sides and Lufthansa played alongside Viktoria 89 Berlin as KSG Lufthansa/Viktoria 89 Berlin in 1943–45. SG disappeared at the end of the war, while Viktoria was re-formed as Sportgruppe Tempelhof before resuming its historical identity in 1948. The footballers of Lufthansa joined SG Staaken which is still active today as SC Staaken. A separate airline worker's side known as BSG Luftfahrt Berlin emerged in Soviet-occupied East Berlin after the war.

== Stadium ==
Lufthansa SG played its home fixtures at Monumentenstraße Schöneberg (capacity 1914/15,000, 1923/8,000, 1941/2,200).
