= 1948–49 Oberliga =

Oberliga
- Season: 1948–49
- Champions: Hamburger SV Berliner SV 92 Borussia Dortmund: 1. FC Kaiserslautern; Kickers Offenbach
- Relegated: Minerva 93 Berlin SC Köpenick Spandauer SV SV Lichtenberg 47 Fortuna Düsseldorf Sportfreunde Katernberg SG Gonsenheim SV Biberach TSG Ulm 1846: 1. Rödelheimer FC 02
- German champions: VfR Mannheim; 1st German title
- Top goalscorer: Werner Baßler (54 goals)

Map of the Allied occupation zones in Germany

The 1948–49 Oberliga was the fourth season of the Oberliga, the first tier of the football league system in the three western zones of Allied-occupied Germany. The league operated in six regional divisions, Berlin, North, South, Southwest (north and south) and West. The five league champions, the runners-up from the North, South, Southwest and West and the third-placed team from the South entered the 1949 German football championship which was won by VfR Mannheim. It was VfR Mannheim's only national championship.

The Oberliga Südwest, covering the French occupation zone in Germany, operated in two regional divisions, north and south, with a championship final at the end of season.

In East Germany the DDR-Oberliga was established after the 1948–49 season in the Soviet occupation zone, set at the first tier of the league system. In 1949 an Eastern zone championship, the 1949 Ostzonenmeisterschaft, was held and won by ZSG Union Halle, but its winner did not advance to the German championship.

In post-Second World War Germany many clubs were forced to change their names or merge. This policy was particularly strongly enforced in the Soviet and French occupation zones but much more relaxed in the British and US one. In most cases clubs eventually reverted to their original names, especially after the formation of the Federal Republic of Germany in 1949.

During the course of the 1948–49 league season the political landscape in Germany changed with the Federal Republic of Germany, commonly referred to as West Germany, established on 23 May 1949, followed by the German Democratic Republic, commonly referred to as East Germany, on 7 October 1949. I t was the first tier of the football league system in the three western zones of Allied-occupied Germany.

== Oberliga Nord ==
The 1948–49 season saw three new clubs promoted to the league, TuS Bremerhaven 93, Eimsbütteler TV and SC Göttingen 05. No team was relegated from the league at the end of season as the league was expanded to 16 teams in 1949–50.

Pos	Team	Pld	W	D	L	GF	GA	GD	Pts	Promotion, qualification or relegation
1	Hamburger SV (Note: Like in the previous season Hamburger SV and FC St. Pauli, on equal points, had to play a championship decider which Hamburger SV won 2–1.)	22	15	2	5	61	31	+30	32	Qualification to German championship
2	FC St. Pauli	22	14	4	4	47	22	+25	32	Qualification to German championship
3	VfL Osnabrück	22	14	3	5	61	23	+38	31	
4	Eintracht Braunschweig	22	12	1	9	48	48	0	25	
5	Bremer SV	22	9	4	9	45	53	−8	22	
6	Eimsbütteler TV	22	9	3	10	35	40	−5	21	
7	VfB Lübeck	22	8	4	10	35	44	−9	20	
8	Werder Bremen	22	8	3	11	49	50	−1	19	
9	Concordia Hamburg	22	6	6	10	44	49	−5	18	
10	Arminia Hannover	22	6	4	12	33	50	−17	16	
11	Göttingen 05	22	5	4	13	35	57	−22	14	
12	TuS Bremerhaven 93	22	7	0	15	28	54	−26	14	
13	Holstein Kiel (Note: Holstein Kiel removed from league for irregularities in the 1947–48 season and initially relegated but then pardoned.)	0	0	0	0	0	0	0	0	

Source: RSSSF.com
Rules for classification: 1) Points;

== Oberliga Berlin ==
The 1948–49 season saw three new clubs promoted to the league, Viktoria 89 Berlin, SV Lichtenberg 47 and Minerva 93 Berlin.

Pos	Team	Pld	W	D	L	GF	GA	GD	Pts	Promotion, qualification or relegation
1	Berliner SV 92	22	17	3	2	54	23	+31	37	Qualification to German championship
2	Tennis Borussia Berlin	22	14	5	3	52	17	+35	33	
3	Union Oberschöneweide	22	14	4	4	52	38	+14	32	
4	Alemannia 90 Berlin	22	12	5	5	59	48	+11	29	
5	Viktoria 89 Berlin	22	11	5	6	51	47	+4	27	
6	Wacker 04 Berlin	22	9	2	11	49	40	+9	20	
7	VfB Pankow	22	5	8	9	34	47	−13	18	
8	BFC Südring	22	6	6	10	32	50	−18	18	
9	Minerva 93 Berlin (R)	22	7	3	12	25	43	−18	17	Relegation to Amateurliga
10	SC Köpenick (R)	22	5	5	12	32	41	−9	15	Relegation to Amateurliga
11	Spandauer SV (R)	22	4	1	17	28	46	−18	9	Relegation to Amateurliga
12	SV Lichtenberg 47 (R)	22	4	1	17	17	55	−38	9	Relegation to Amateurliga

Source: RSSSF.com
Rules for classification: 1) Points;
(R) Relegated

== Oberliga West ==
The 1948–49 season saw three new clubs promoted to the league, Rot-Weiß Essen, Rhenania Würselen and Preußen Münster.

Pos	Team	Pld	W	D	L	GF	GA	GD	Pts	Promotion, qualification or relegation
1	Borussia Dortmund	24	17	4	3	79	30	+49	38	Qualification to German championship
2	Rot-Weiß Essen	24	10	10	4	39	22	+17	30	Qualification to German championship
3	STV Horst-Emscher	24	11	5	8	51	40	+11	27	
4	Preußen Münster	24	9	7	8	33	35	−2	25	
5	Rot-Weiß Oberhausen	24	9	6	9	36	25	+11	24	
6	Sportfreunde Hamborn	24	10	4	10	40	44	−4	24	
7	TSG Vohwinkel	24	10	3	11	41	45	−4	23	
8	Alemannia Aachen	24	8	7	9	33	39	−6	23	
9	SpVgg Erkenschwick	24	9	3	12	42	53	−11	21	
10	Rhenania Würselen	24	8	5	11	33	48	−15	21	
11	Fortuna Düsseldorf (R)	24	8	4	12	31	45	−14	20	Relegation to Amateurliga
12	FC Schalke 04	24	6	6	12	33	43	−10	18	
13	Sportfreunde Katernberg (R)	24	7	4	13	29	51	−22	18	Relegation to Amateurliga

Source: RSSSF.com
Rules for classification: 1) Points;
(R) Relegated

=== Relegation play-offs ===
Group A

Pos	Team	Pld	W	D	L	GF	GA	Pts
1	Preußen Dellbrück	2	2	0	0	4	2	4
2	SpVgg Herten	2	0	1	1	4	5	1
2	Fortuna Düsseldorf	2	0	1	1	4	5	1

Group B

Pos	Team	Pld	W	D	L	GF	GA	Pts
1	FC Schalke 04	2	2	0	0	10	0	4
2	Bayer 04 Leverkusen	2	1	0	1	1	1	2
3	VfL 06 Benrath	2	0	0	2	0	10	0

Group C

Pos	Team	Pld	W	D	L	GF	GA	Pts
1	Duisburger FV 08	2	2	0	0	5	0	4
2	VfL Witten	2	0	1	1	2	3	1
3	Sportfreunde Katernberg	2	0	1	1	2	6	1

== Oberliga Südwest ==
=== Northern group ===
The 1948–49 season saw three new clubs promoted to the league, Eintracht Trier, SpVgg Weisenau and BSC Oppau.

Pos	Team	Pld	W	D	L	GF	GA	GD	Pts	Promotion, qualification or relegation
1	1. FC Kaiserslautern	24	21	1	2	142	22	+120	43	Qualification to German championship
2	Wormatia Worms	24	15	6	3	75	24	+51	36	Qualification to German championship
3	TuS Neuendorf	24	16	2	6	75	21	+54	34	
4	FK Pirmasens	24	14	5	5	58	41	+17	33	
5	VfL Neustadt	24	15	2	7	44	42	+2	32	
6	Phönix Ludwigshafen	24	8	7	9	49	44	+5	23	
7	Eintracht Trier	24	8	4	12	46	62	−16	20	
8	FSV Mainz 05	24	7	6	11	39	67	−28	20	
9	SpVgg Weisenau	24	7	4	13	44	86	−42	18	
10	BSC Oppau	24	4	8	12	39	60	−21	16	
11	SpVgg Andernach	24	6	4	14	38	61	−23	16	
12	FSV Kürenz	24	6	3	15	23	55	−32	15	
13	SG Gonsenheim (R)	24	2	2	20	19	106	−87	6	Relegation to Amateurliga

Source: RSSSF.com
Rules for classification: 1) Points;
(R) Relegated

=== Southern group ===
The 1948–49 season saw two new clubs promoted to the league, SV Tübingen and FC 08 Villingen.

Pos	Team	Pld	W	D	L	GF	GA	GD	Pts	Promotion, qualification or relegation
1	Fortuna Freiburg	22	13	5	4	49	28	+21	31	Qualification to French occupation zone championship
2	SV Tübigen	22	12	7	3	48	25	+23	31	Qualification to runners-up play-offs
3	ASV Villingen	22	10	6	6	37	28	+9	26	
4	Eintracht Singen	22	10	4	8	34	22	+12	24	
5	Fortuna Rastatt	22	10	3	9	53	54	−1	23	
6	SSV Reutlingen	22	7	8	7	34	26	+8	22	
7	VfL Schwenningen	22	7	7	8	31	40	−9	21	
8	VfL Konstanz	23	8	4	11	40	37	+3	20	
9	VfL Freiburg	23	8	4	11	31	39	−8	20	
10	SG Friedrichshafen	22	8	4	10	40	51	−11	20	
11	SV Biberach (R)	22	5	6	11	32	52	−20	16	Relegation to Amateurliga
12	SpVgg Offenburg	22	2	6	14	26	53	−27	10	

Source: RSSSF.com
Rules for classification: 1) Points;
(R) Relegated

=== Finals ===
The winners of the two regional divisions of the Oberliga Südwest played a final to determine the league champion who was also directly qualified for the German championship:

Team 1	Agg.	Team 2	1st leg	2nd leg
1. FC Kaiserslautern	10–3	Fortuna Freiburg	4–0	6–3

The runners-up of the two divisions determined the club who would face the loser of the championship final for the second place in the German championship:

Team 1	Agg.	Team 2	1st leg	2nd leg
Wormatia Worms	8–0	SV Tübingen	5–0	3–0

Team 1	Score	Team 2
Wormatia Worms	3–0	Fortuna Freiburg

== Oberliga Süd ==
The 1948–49 season saw two new clubs promoted to the league, BC Augsburg and 1. Rödelheimer FC 02.

Pos	Team	Pld	W	D	L	GF	GA	GD	Pts	Promotion, qualification or relegation
1	Kickers Offenbach	30	21	7	2	79	29	+50	49	Qualification to German championship
2	VfR Mannheim (C)	30	15	8	7	51	42	+9	38	Qualification to German championship
3	FC Bayern Munich	30	14	7	9	61	42	+19	35	Qualification to German championship
4	TSV 1860 München	30	13	8	9	61	41	+20	34	
5	SV Waldhof Mannheim	30	12	10	8	54	45	+9	34	
6	VfB Stuttgart	30	13	5	12	56	51	+5	31	
7	Schwaben Augsburg	30	12	6	12	49	50	−1	30	
8	Stuttgarter Kickers	30	11	8	11	53	65	−12	30	
9	VfB Mühlburg	30	10	9	11	51	45	+6	29	
10	FC Schweinfurt 05	30	12	5	13	46	56	−10	29	
11	1. FC Nürnberg	30	11	5	14	49	55	−6	27	
12	FSV Frankfurt	30	11	5	14	40	53	−13	27	
13	Eintracht Frankfurt	30	9	8	13	28	41	−13	26	
14	BC Augsburg (Note: BC Augsburg and TSG Ulm 1846 had to play a relegation decider which Augsburg won 1–0.)	30	9	4	17	46	66	−20	22	
15	TSG Ulm 1846 (R)	30	9	4	17	43	53	−10	22	Relegation to Amateurliga
16	1. Rödelheimer FC 02 (R)	30	7	3	20	40	73	−33	17	Relegation to Amateurliga

Source: RSSSF.com
Rules for classification: 1) Points;
(C) Champions; (R) Relegated

== German championship ==
The 1949 German football championship was contested by the eight qualified Oberliga teams and won by VfR Mannheim, defeating Borussia Dortmund in the final. It was played in a knock-out format and consisted of ten clubs.
