= Stadtmitte =

Stadtmitte may refer to:

- Düsseldorf-Stadtmitte
- SG Stadtmitte Berlin, a former German football club

== Transport ==
- Stadtmitte station (Berlin U-Bahn)
- Koblenz-Stadtmitte station
- Stuttgart Stadtmitte station, an S-Bahn Station in Stuttgart, Germany

== See also ==
- Mitte
