= Oberliga Berlin (1945–1963) =

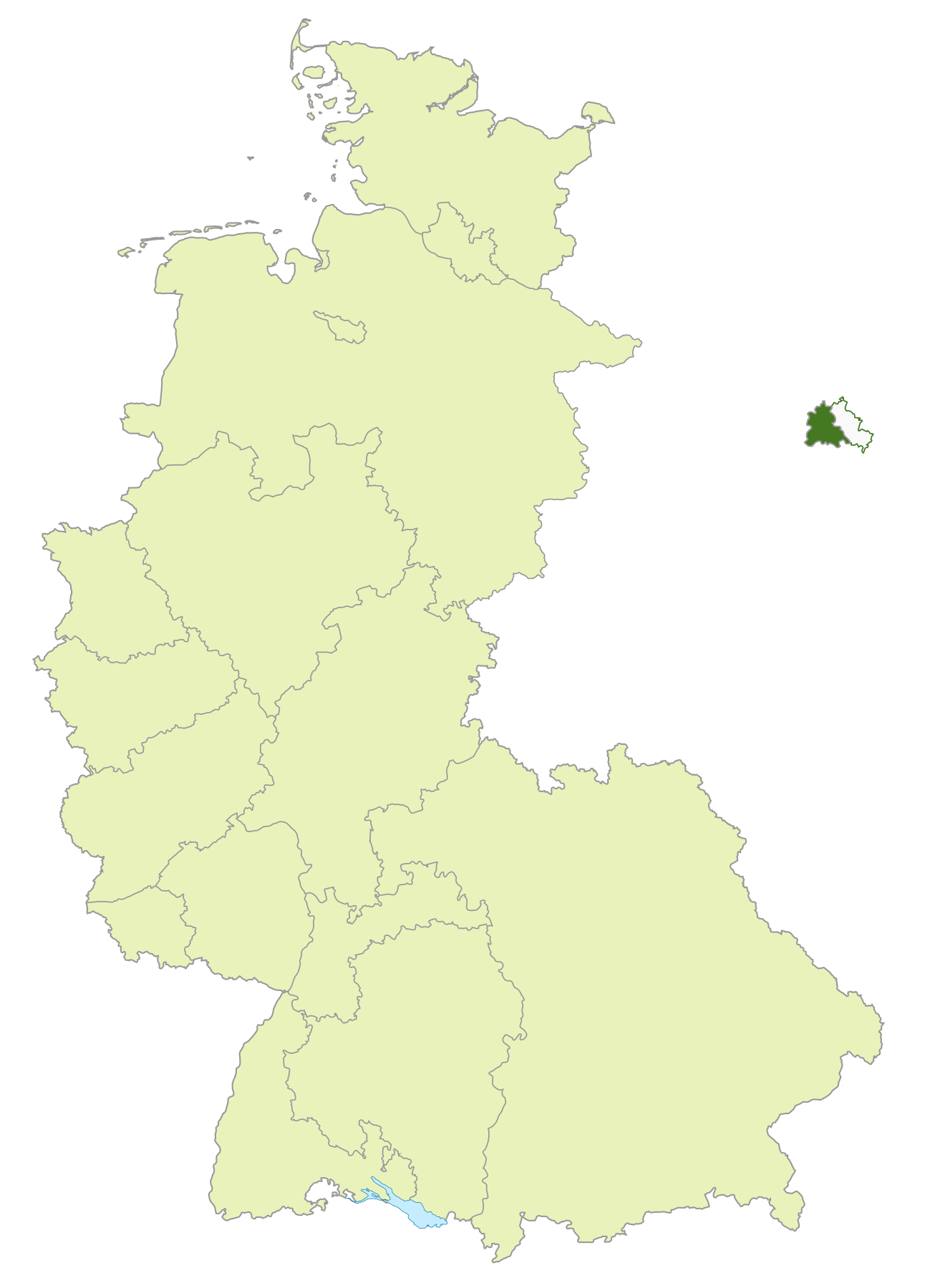
- Founded: 1945
- Folded: 1963 (18 seasons)
- Replaced by: Bundesliga
- Country: Germany
- State: Berlin
- Level on pyramid: Level 1
- Relegation to: Amateurliga Berlin
- Domestic cup: Berlin Cup
- Last champions: Hertha BSC (1962–63)

The Oberliga Berlin (English: Premier league Berlin), sometimes also referred to as Stadtliga Berlin (English: City league Berlin) or Vertragsliga Berlin (English: Contract league Berlin) was the highest level of the German football league system in the city of West Berlin in West Germany from 1945 until the formation of the Bundesliga in 1963. It was by far the smallest of the five Oberligas.

== Overview ==
The league was created in 1945, incorporating clubs from all four sectors of the allied-occupied Berlin. It replaced the Gauliga Berlin-Brandenburg as the highest league in the region. In its first year, it was staged in four groups with the winner of each group taking part in a finals tournament. In 1946, three clubs from each of those four groups went to form the single-division, twelve team, Oberliga Berlin. Alongside the Oberliga Berlin, four other Oberligas were formed in Germany in those years:

- Oberliga West (formed in 1947)
- Oberliga Nord (formed in 1947)
- Oberliga Südwest (formed in 1945)
- Oberliga Süd (formed in 1945)

The clubs in Berlin were originally not permitted to carry their pre-war names and had to be simply named after the suburb they represented. This rule was slowly lifted in the three western sectors and by 1948, clubs in what was to become West-Berlin carried their original names again. In the Soviet sector, the future East Berlin, clubs took up names in accordance with the requirements of the new Communist regime.

With the reintroduction of the German championship in 1948, the winner of the Oberliga Berlin went on to the finals tournament with the other Oberliga champions. Being the smallest of the five Oberligas it is not surprising that no club from Berlin won a German championship in these years or even reached the final.

After the 1949–50 season, the clubs from East Berlin left the unified Berlin league system and joined the East German leagues instead. Union Oberschöneweide, qualified for the German championship finals in 1950, was not permitted to participate in this tournament either. The Oberliga Berlin carried on with clubs from West Berlin only.

Below the Oberliga Berlin ranked the Amateurliga Berlin as a second tier. Originally staged in a varying number of groups, it became a single-group competition from 1950.

With the construction of the Berlin Wall in 1961 the clubs in West Berlin suffered a substantial loss of revenue because they were cut off from supporters in the Eastern part of the city, causing the Oberliga clubs to suffer financially. Novel ideas were floated to combat the problem, like, instead of players receiving the maximum legal wage for a footballer in West Germany's top tier at the time, DM 400 per month, the players should only be paid for results, meaning they would not receive any money for games the club lost.

In 1963, after 18 seasons, the Oberliga Berlin was disbanded in favor of the new Bundesliga. The champion of the 1962–63 season, Hertha BSC Berlin, was admitted to the new Bundesliga.

The four sectors of Allied occupation in Berlin

== Reforming of the Oberliga Berlin ==
In 1974, with the disbanding of the Regionalliga Berlin, the Oberliga Berlin was re-created, now as the third tier of German football. This was not the formation of a new league, but the renaming of the Amateurliga Berlin to Oberliga Berlin.

== Founding members of the Oberliga Berlin ==
The following clubs took part in the first proper season of the Oberliga in 1946–47. The names in brackets are the ones they carried in this season:

- Tennis Borussia Berlin, (SG Charlottenburg)
- BSV 1892 Berlin, (SG Wilmersdorf)
- Wacker 04 Berlin, (SG Reinickendorf-West)
- Alemannia 90 Berlin, (SG Prenzlauer Berg)
- SC Staaken, (SG Staaken)
- Blau-Weiß 90 Berlin, (SG Mariendorf)
- BFC Nordstern, (SG Osloer Straße)
- Köpenicker SC, (SG Köpenick)
- BFC Südring, (SG Südring)
- SV Lichtenberg 47, (SG Lichtenberg-Nord)
- SG Stadtmitte Berlin
- Viktoria 89 Berlin, (SG Tempelhof)

== Disbanding of the Oberliga ==
With the introduction of the new Bundesliga, the Oberligas were disbanded. The top team of the Oberliga Berlin was admitted to the Bundesliga, the clubs placed second to eight went to the Regionalliga Berlin, one of the five new second divisions. The bottom two teams were relegated to the Amateurliga Berlin while the top three from the Amateurliga were promoted.

Admitted to Bundesliga:

- Hertha BSC

The following teams from the Oberliga went to the new Regionalliga:

- Tasmania 1900 Berlin
- Tennis Borussia Berlin
- Spandauer SV
- Hertha Zehlendorf
- Wacker 04 Berlin
- BFC Südring
- BSV 1892 Berlin

Relegated to the Amateurliga:

- Viktoria 89 Berlin
- SC Tegel

== Qualifying for the Bundesliga ==
The qualifying system for the new league was fairly complex. The league placings of the clubs playing in the Oberligen for the last ten seasons were taken into consideration, whereby results from 1952 to 1955 counted once, results from 1955 to 1959 counted double and results from 1959 to 1963 triple. A first-place finish was awarded 16 points, a sixteenth place one point. Appearances in the German championship or DFB-Pokal finals were also rewarded with points. The five Oberliga champions of the 1962–63 season were granted direct access to the Bundesliga. All up, 46 clubs applied for the 16 available Bundesliga slots.

Following this system, by 11 January 1963, the DFB announced nine fixed clubs for the new league and reduced the clubs eligible for the remaining seven places to 20. Clubs within the same Oberliga that were separated by less than 50 points were considered on equal rank and the 1962-63 placing was used to determine the qualified team.

From this league, only three clubs applied for the one available spot, Hertha BSC Berlin qualified early.

Points table:

Rank	Club	Points 1952 to 1963	Place in 1962–63
1	Hertha BSC Berlin ^{1}	346	1
2	Tasmania 1900 Berlin ^{3}	324	2
3	Viktoria 89 Berlin ^{3}	318	9

- Source: DSFS Liga-Chronik (in German), page: B 12, accessed: 4 November 2008
- Bold Denotes club qualified for the new Bundesliga.
- ^{1} Denotes club was one of the nine selected on 11 January 1963.
- ^{2} Denotes club was one of the 20 taken into final selection.
- ^{3} Denotes club was one of the 15 applicants which were removed from final selection.
- ^{4} Denotes club withdrew Bundesliga application.

== Honours ==
The winners and runners-up of the Oberliga Berlin:

Season	Winner	Runner-Up
1945–46	BSV 1892 Berlin	Alemannia 90 Berlin
1946–47	Tennis Borussia Berlin	BSV 1892 Berlin
1947–48	Union 06 Oberschöneweide	BSV 1892 Berlin
1948–49	BSV 1892 Berlin	Tennis Borussia Berlin
1949–50	Tennis Borussia Berlin	Union 06 Oberschöneweide
1950–51	Tennis Borussia Berlin	Union 06 Berlin
1951–52	Tennis Borussia Berlin	Union 06 Berlin
1952–53	Union 06 Berlin	Spandauer SV
1953–54	BSV 1892 Berlin	Minerva Berlin
1954–55	Viktoria 89 Berlin	Tennis Borussia Berlin
1955–56	Viktoria 89 Berlin	Minerva Berlin
1956–57	Hertha BSC	Tennis Borussia Berlin
1957–58	Tennis Borussia Berlin	Viktoria 89 Berlin
1958–59	Tasmania 1900 Berlin	Spandauer SV
1959–60	Tasmania 1900 Berlin	Hertha BSC
1960–61	Hertha BSC	Tasmania 1900 Berlin
1961–62	Tasmania 1900 Berlin	Hertha BSC
1962–63	Hertha BSC	Tasmania 1900 Berlin

- Union 06 Oberschöneweide, a club from East Berlin, left the unified league in 1950. Its players moved to West Berlin and formed Union 06 Berlin.

== Placings & all-time table of the Oberliga Berlin ==
The final placings and all-time table of the Oberliga Berlin:

Club	47	48	49	50	51	52	53	54	55	56	57	58	59	60	61	62	63	S	G	GF	GA	Points
Tennis Borussia Berlin	1	3	2	1	1	1	3	6	2	7	2	1	7	6	3	3	3	17	434	1038	599	561
BSV 1892 Berlin	2	2	1	3	4	8	5	1	3	3	8	4	8	4	8	5	8	17	421	833	678	483
Spandauer SV		6	11		6	6	2	4	6	4	7	3	2	3	4	4	4	15	374	736	586	427
Viktoria 89 Berlin	12		5	9	7	3	4	7	1	1	4	2	4	7	6	9	9	16	408	811	773	412
Hertha BSC				10	3	4	13		7	10	1	6	3	2	1	2	1	13	345	760	570	404
SC Tasmania 1900 Berlin				7	8	12				9	6	5	1	1	2	1	2	11	299	565	406	359
Wacker 04 Berlin	3	5	6	5	11	9	9	9	8	12		10	10	5	5	8	6	16	396	677	775	352
SC Union 06 Berlin					2	2	1	3	5	6	3	9	9	11		10		11	283	533	529	295
Alemannia 90 Berlin	4	4	4	4	5	5	7	5	9	11		12						11	252	508	465	265
Blau-Weiß 90 Berlin	6	11			12	7	6	10	10	5	5	8	5	9				12	293	451	569	263
BFC Südring	9	7	8	6	14		11		11		11		11		7	6	7	12	296	443	671	218
Minerva Berlin			9		9	11	8	2	4	2	10	11						9	208	349	408	200
Hertha Zehlendorf								11		8	9	7	6	8	9	7	9	9	232	346	425	196
BFC Nordstern	7	12				10	10	8	12									6	138	216	351	101
Union Oberschöneweide *		1	3	2														3	67	189	87	98
VfB Pankow *		8	7	8														3	66	92	133	56
Köpenicker SC *	8	9	10															3	66	114	140	53
SC Staaken	5	10																2	44	80	148	33
VfB Britz				11	13													2	48	61	114	30
SV Lichtenberg 47 *	10		12															2	44	63	106	28
SC Westend 01					10	13												2	52	65	126	28
Kickers 1900 Berlin								12							10			2	49	47	131	24
Rapide Wedding											12		12					2	55	60	148	21
Norden-Nordwest Berlin														10				1	30	41	73	20
SC Tegel																	10	1	27	39	85	15
SG Stadtmitte Berlin	11																	1	22	34	61	13
VfL Nord Berlin				12		14												2	48	47	167	13
SSC Südwest							12											1	24	32	64	12

Source: "Oberliga Berlin". Das deutsche Fussball-Archiv.

Source: "All-time table of the Oberligas". Clas Glenning. Archived from the original on 2009-07-31.

- Table includes results from the finals rounds of the German championship.
- * denotes clubs based in East Berlin.
