= Robert Schlienz =

German footballer (1924–1995)

Personal information
- Full name: Robert Schlienz
- Date of birth: 3 February 1924
- Place of birth: Stuttgart-Zuffenhausen, Weimar Republic
- Date of death: 18 June 1995 (aged 71)
- Place of death: Dettenhausen, Germany
- Positions: Forward; defender

Youth career
- 1930–1942: FV Zuffenhausen

Senior career*
Years	Team	Apps	(Gls)
1940–1945	FV Zuffenhausen	?	(?)
1945–1960	VfB Stuttgart	391	(143)

International career
1955–1956	Germany	3	(0)
- * Club domestic league appearances and goals

Robert Schlienz (3 February 1924 – 18 June 1995) was a German football player. He is considered one of the best players ever to play for current Bundesliga side VfB Stuttgart. He also played three times for his national side.

Growing up in Zuffenhausen (it was incorporated into Stuttgart in 1931), his youth club was local FV Zuffenhausen. In 1942, his side won the Junior Championships of the state of Württemberg.

Late in World War II, he was called up into the Wehrmacht, fighting on the Eastern Front. After being shot into the jaw, he was dismissed and sent back home. In the 1944/45 season, he began playing, initially as a "guest player", for VfB Stuttgart.

The war had taken five vital players from FV Zuffenhausen, which left the club unable to compete. Thus, Schlienz joined VfB permanently in the summer of 1945, as the Stuttgart-Bad Cannstatt club took part in the newly founded semi-professional Oberliga Süd (South) from October 1945.

In 1945–46, Schlienz, playing as centre forward, scored 46 goals in 30 games, becoming the record goal scorer in the Oberliga.

But on 14 August 1948, he lost his left forearm (it had to be amputated) in a car accident travelling to a VfB cup match in Aalen. Devastated, he thought his career was finished, but his coach, Georg Wurzer, encouraged him to continue his career.

Wurzer now positioned him in offensive midfield, as an inside forward, instead of centre forward. Schlienz made his comeback on 5 December 1948, against Bayern Munich.

Despite being handicapped, he was now captain and playmaker at VfB Stuttgart, leading the team to win the German Championship twice in 1950 and 1952 (runner-up in 1953, losing to 1. FC Kaiserslautern) and the German Cup twice in 1954 and 1958.

In 1955 and 1956, he earned three caps for (West) Germany under the famous coach Sepp Herberger.

He ended his career in 1960 and subsequently moved to the village of Dettenhausen, about 20 miles south of Stuttgart, where he died and was buried in 1995.

VfB Stuttgart named their reserves stadium in Bad Cannstatt after him almost immediately after his death.
