= Oberliga Süd (1945–1963) =

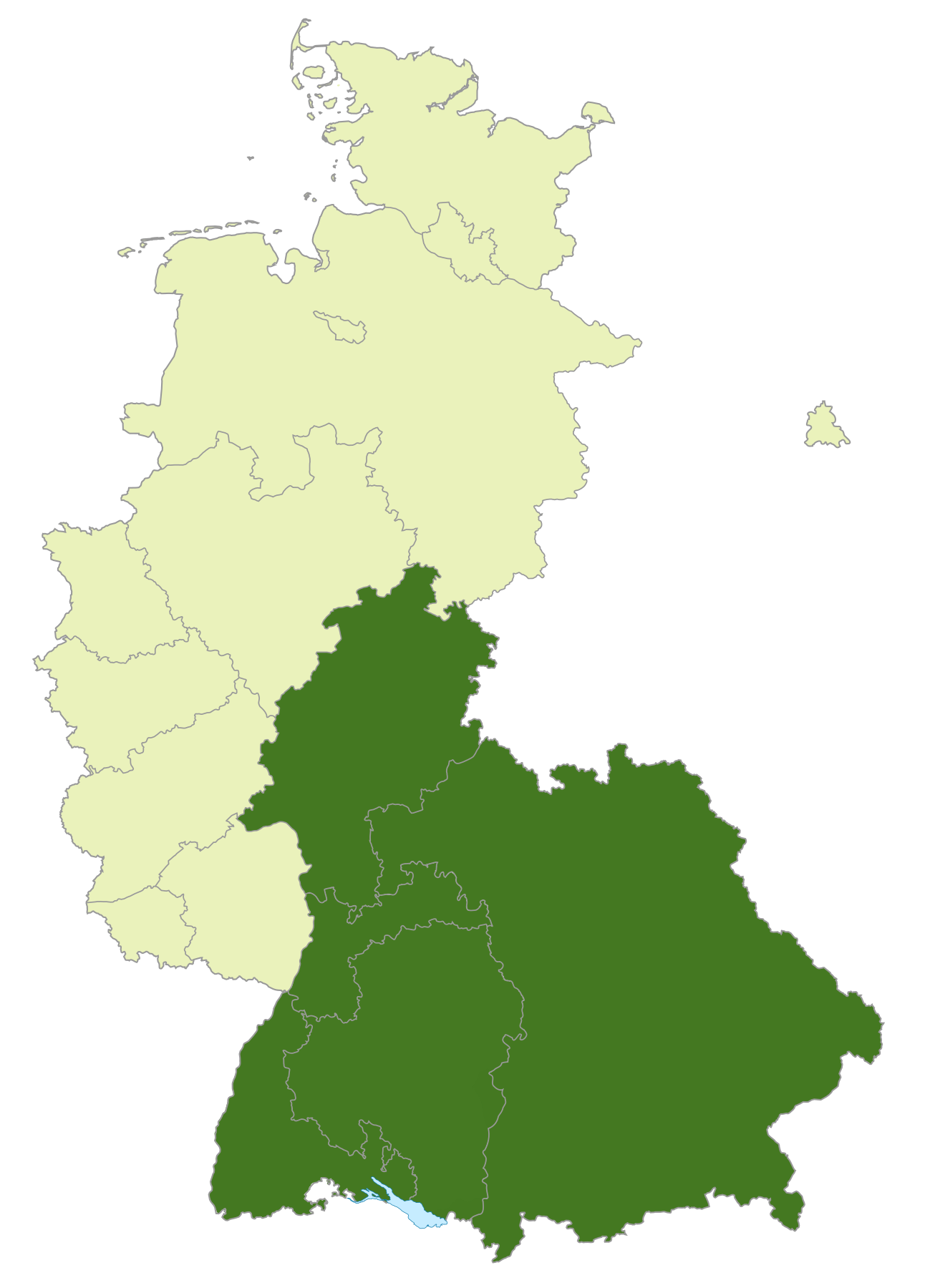
- Founded: 1945
- Folded: 1963 (18 seasons)
- Replaced by: Bundesliga
- Country: Germany
- State: Bavaria; Baden-Württemberg; Hesse
- Level on pyramid: Level 1
- Relegation to: 2. Oberliga Süd
- Last champions: 1860 Munich (1962–63)

The Oberliga Süd (English: Premier League South) was the southernmost of the five Oberligen, the regional leagues forming the top level of association football in West Germany from 1945 until the formation of the Bundesliga in 1963. Oberliga Süd covered the southern three German states of Bavaria, Baden-Württemberg and Hesse.

== Overview ==
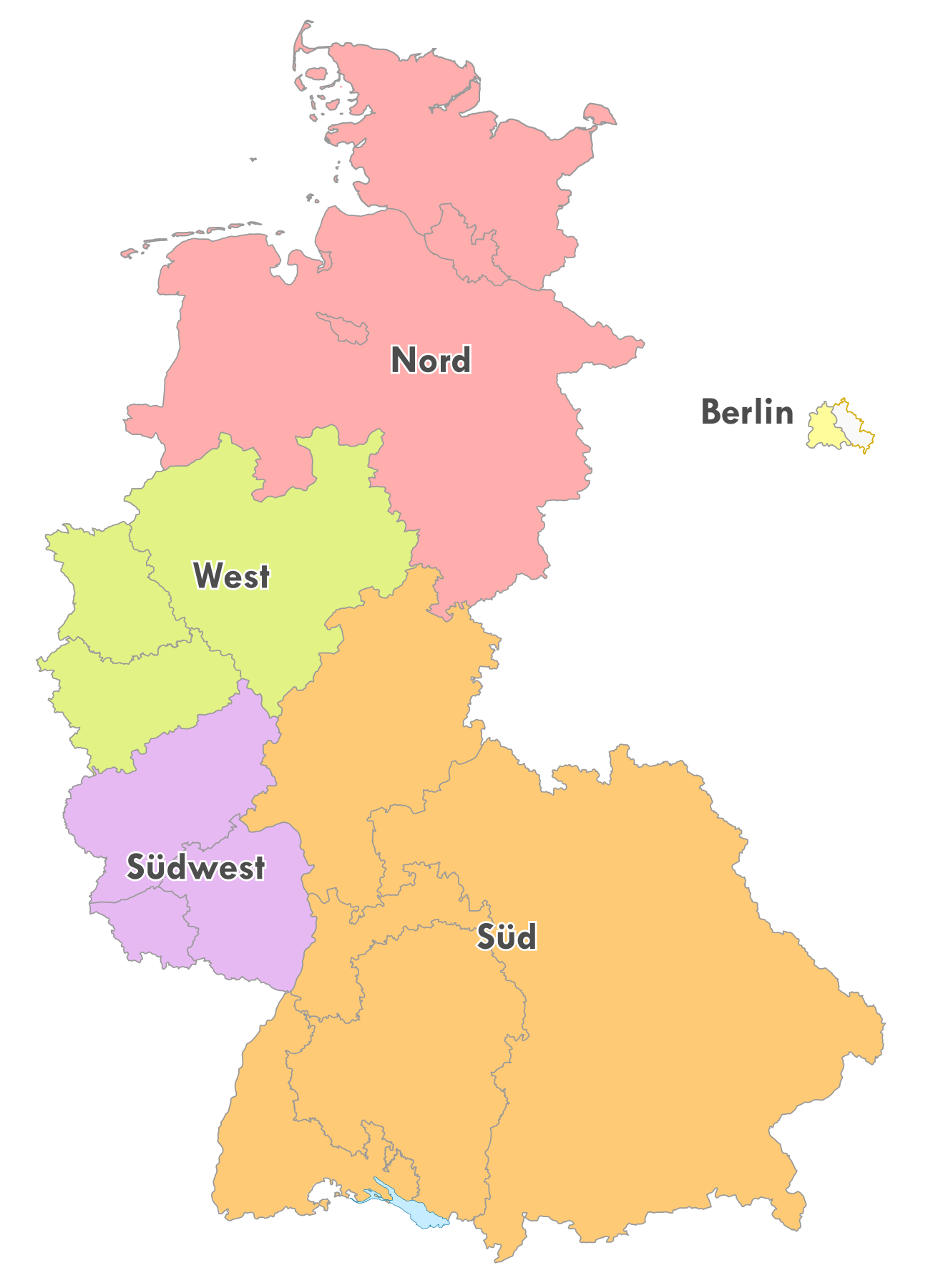
Map of the five German Oberligas and East Germany in 1963.

The league was introduced as the highest level of football in the US occupation zone in 1945 to replace the disbanded Gauligen. It played its first round on 4 November 1945 and continued on throughout winter. No less than 16 clubs were elected into the new league, a novelty in German football and quite an achievement in the early post-war conditions. At this stage, clubs from the south-western parts of Baden and Württemberg were not eligible to compete in it as they were based in the French occupation zone and had to play in the Oberliga Südwest (Südgruppe), where they remained until 1950, when the separation of South and Southwest was made final. Play in the southern parts of Germany went underway almost straight after the end of the war while the north and east still had to wait some more years. One reason for this was that the less industrial, more agricultural south had sustained much less damage to infrastructure. But there was another specific advantage. The authorities in the U.S. zone encouraged the relaunch of competitive sports on a regional basis much earlier than this happened in the other zones. Regional (or nationwide) football associations were not tolerated anywhere before 1948. The Oberliga Süd, however, was licensed to a group of private persons, thus being a sort of "independent" league during its first five seasons. It did not join the South German F.A. until 1950.

The clubs in the Oberliga Süd had been in the following Gauligen:

- Gauliga Baden (without the clubs from the southern half)
- Gauliga Bayern
- Gauliga Kurhessen
- Gauliga Hessen-Nassau
- Gauliga Württemberg

In addition to the Oberliga Süd, four other Oberligas were formed in Germany in the 1940s.

- Oberliga West (formed in 1947)
- Oberliga Nord (formed in 1947)
- Oberliga Berlin (formed in 1945, originally with clubs from West and East Berlin)
- Oberliga Südwest (formed in 1945)

Set below the Oberliga were originally the Landesligas of Hessen, Bayern, Württemberg and Nordbaden, from 1950 also Südbaden. From 1950 the 2. Oberliga Süd was formed as an intermediate between Oberliga and Landesligas.

With the reintroduction of the German championship in 1948, the winner and runners-up of the Oberliga Süd went on to the finals tournament with the other Oberliga champions. In 16 attempts the Oberliga Süd managed to win it six times.

In 1950, the southern group of the Oberliga Südwest was disbanded and its clubs joined the Southern German Football Association. The SSV Reutlingen and the FC Singen 04 joined the Oberliga Süd, SV Tübingen, Freiburger FC and Vfl Konstanz were integrated into the new 2nd Oberliga Süd and the other eleven clubs were relegated to the Amateurliga.

The Oberliga Süd had quite a few permanent clubs. The VfB Stuttgart, 1. FC Nürnberg, Eintracht Frankfurt, Kickers Offenbach, VfR Mannheim and 1. FC Schweinfurt 05 played all of the 18 possible seasons in the league. The Karlsruher SC was also present for all 18 seasons but only by counting in both halves of the merger club.

== Founding members of the Oberliga Süd ==
In order of finish:

- VfB Stuttgart
- 1. FC Nürnberg
- Stuttgarter Kickers
- TSV Schwaben Augsburg
- SV Waldhof Mannheim
- FC Bayern Munich
- FC Schweinfurt 05
- BC Augsburg
- TSV 1860 Munich
- FSV Frankfurt
- Eintracht Frankfurt
- Kickers Offenbach
- SpVgg Fürth
- VfR Mannheim
- Phönix Karlsruhe
- Karlsruher FV

Of those clubs, the Karlsruher FV was reformed and the Phönix Karlsruhe is now the Karlsruher SC.

== Disbanding of the Oberliga ==
With the introduction of the Bundesliga, five teams from the Oberliga Süd were admitted to the new Bundesliga. The remaining clubs went to the new Regionalliga Süd, one of five new second divisions.

The teams admitted to the Bundesliga were:

- TSV 1860 Munich (Champion Oberliga Süd 1963)
- 1. FC Nürnberg (Runners-up Oberliga Süd 1963)
- Eintracht Frankfurt (4th placed Oberliga Süd 1963)
- Karlsruher SC (5th placed Oberliga Süd 1963)
- VfB Stuttgart (6th placed Oberliga Süd 1963)

The 3rd placed team of the 1963 season, the FC Bayern Munich was not admitted as the German Football Association did not want two teams from the same city in the league and TSV 1860 Munich had qualified in a higher position.

The following teams from the Oberliga went to the new Regionalliga:

- FC Bayern Munich
- Kickers Offenbach
- TSG Ulm 1846
- SpVgg Fürth
- Hessen Kassel
- 1. FC Schweinfurt 05
- VfR Mannheim
- FC Bayern Hof
- SSV Reutlingen
- TSV Schwaben Augsburg
- BC Augsburg

== Qualifying for the Bundesliga ==
The qualifying system for the new league was fairly complex. The league placings of the clubs playing in the Oberligen for the last ten seasons were taken into consideration, whereby results from 1952 to 1955 counted once, results from 1955 to 1959 counted double and results from 1959 to 1963 triple. A first-place finish was awarded 16 points, a sixteenth place one point. Appearances in the German championship or DFB-Pokal finals were also rewarded with points. The five Oberliga champions of the 1962–63 season were granted direct access to the Bundesliga. All up, 46 clubs applied for the 16 available Bundesliga slots.

Following this system, by 11 January 1963, the DFB announced nine fixed clubs for the new league and reduced the clubs eligible for the remaining seven places to 20. Clubs within the same Oberliga that were separated by less than 50 points were considered on equal rank and the 1962-63 placing was used to determine the qualified team.

Of the thirteen clubs from this league applying, the 1. FC Nürnberg and Eintracht Frankfurt qualified early. Karlsruher SC and VfB Stuttgart held third and fourth place in the overall points ranking. Kickers Offenbach and FC Bayern Munich missed out to TSV 1860 Munich due to the latter winning the league in 1962–63 even though 1860 were 153 points behind Offenbach and 59 behind FC Bayern.

Points table:

Rank	Club	Points 1952 to 1963	Place in 1962–63
1	1. FC Nürnberg ^{1}	447	2
2	Eintracht Frankfurt ^{1}	420	4
3	Karlsruher SC ^{2}	419	5
4	VfB Stuttgart ^{2}	408	6
5	Kickers Offenbach ^{2}	382	7
6	FC Bayern Munich ^{2}	288	3
7	TSV 1860 Munich ^{2}	229	1
8	VfR Mannheim ^{3}	227	12
9	SpVgg Fürth ^{3}	224	9
10	1. FC Schweinfurt 05 ^{3}	185	11
11	FC Bayern Hof ^{3}	90	13
12	TSV Schwaben Augsburg ^{3}	61	15
13	KSV Hessen Kassel ^{3}	36	10

- Source: DSFS Liga-Chronik (in German), page: B 12, accessed: 4 November 2008
- ^{1} Denotes club was one of the nine selected on 11 January 1963.
- ^{2} Denotes club was one of the 20 taken into final selection.
- ^{3} Denotes club was one of the 15 applicants which were removed from final selection.

== Honours ==
The winners and runners-up of the Oberliga Süd:

Season	Winners	Runners-up
1945–46	VfB Stuttgart	1. FC Nürnberg
1946–47	1. FC Nürnberg	SV Waldhof Mannheim
1947–48	**1. FC Nürnberg**	1860 Munich
1948–49	Kickers Offenbach	**VfR Mannheim**
1949–50	SpVgg Fürth	**VfB Stuttgart**
1950–51	1. FC Nürnberg	SpVgg Fürth
1951–52	**VfB Stuttgart**	1. FC Nürnberg
1952–53	Eintracht Frankfurt	VfB Stuttgart
1953–54	VfB Stuttgart	Eintracht Frankfurt
1954–55	Kickers Offenbach	SSV Reutlingen
1955–56	Karlsruher SC	VfB Stuttgart
1956–57	1. FC Nürnberg	Kickers Offenbach
1957–58	Karlsruher SC	1. FC Nürnberg
1958–59	**Eintracht Frankfurt**	Kickers Offenbach
1959–60	Karlsruher SC	Kickers Offenbach
1960–61	**1. FC Nürnberg**	Eintracht Frankfurt
1961–62	1. FC Nürnberg	Eintracht Frankfurt
1962–63	1860 Munich	1. FC Nürnberg

- **Bold** denotes team went on to win German Championship.

== Placings & all-time table of the Oberliga Süd ==
The final placings and all-time table of the Oberliga Süd:

Club	46	47	48	49	50	51	52	53	54	55	56	57	58	59	60	61	62	63	S	G	GF	GA	Points
1. FC Nürnberg	2	1	1	11	8	1	2	9	4	9	7	1	2	3	6	1	1	2	18	560	1348	754	739
Kickers Offenbach	12	5	9	1	3	10	3	6	3	1	4	2	5	2	2	4	4	7	18	560	1236	848	684
VfB Stuttgart	1	6	5	6	2	4	1	2	1	13	2	4	9	5	7	7	5	6	18	560	1165	824	661
Eintracht Frankfurt	11	3	10	13	14	8	4	1	2	4	6	5	3	1	4	2	2	4	18	560	1117	809	661
FC Bayern Munich	6	11	4	3	13	9	8	7	9	16		10	7	4	3	8	3	3	17	530	1060	922	554
VfR Mannheim	14	12	8	2	4	12	5	13	10	10	3	7	10	8	10	9	10	12	18	560	1022	1066	546
SpVgg Fürth	13	10	15		1	2	6	3	11	11	13	6	4	7	11	11	12	9	17	530	920	899	528
1. FC Schweinfurt 05	7	9	13	10	12	7	14	5	8	3	8	12	8	10	12	14	14	11	18	560	854	953	524
TSV 1860 Munich	9	4	2	4	9	6	13	15			16		6	6	5	6	7	1	15	470	908	815	507
FSV Frankfurt	10	14	7	12	5	5	7	11	7	6	9	11	13	11	9	12	15		17	530	812	907	506
Karlsruher SC								4	5	5	1	3	1	9	1	3	9	5	11	330	727	524	401
SV Waldhof Mannheim	4	2	6	5	6	14	10	8	15					16		13	16		12	380	646	704	369
Stuttgarter Kickers	3	7	3	8	16		12	14	14	12	14	14	16		16				13	406	774	795	360
BC Augsburg	8	17		14	10	16		10	12	7	11	13	12	15			11	16	14	432	737	983	353
TSV Schwaben Augsburg	5	8	11	7	11	13	15			8	12	15					13	15	12	380	600	711	347
Viktoria Aschaffenburg		15	17				11	12	16		5	8	11	14	15				10	316	504	720	264
SSV Reutlingen *						18				2	15		14	12	8	5	8	14	9	274	470	598	243
TSG Ulm 1846		13	12	15				16						13	14	15		8	8	256	390	508	212
VfB Mühlburg			14	9	7	3	9*												5	162	309	248	166
SSV Jahn Regensburg					15				6	14	10	9	15			16			7	210	281	509	164
VfL Neckarau		16	16			11	16												4	140	242	344	111
FC Bayern Hof															13	10	6	13	4	120	181	262	105
KSV Hessen Kassel									13	15								10	3	90	140	198	70
Phönix Karlsruhe	15	20																	2	68	100	185	42
Karlsruher FV	16	19																	2	68	81	196	40
1. FC Bamberg		18																	1	38	44	75	28
SV Darmstadt 98						15													1	34	54	86	25
FC Singen 04 *						17													1	34	56	112	22
Rot-Weiß Frankfurt			18																1	38	50	99	22
FC Wacker München			19																1	38	41	89	21
Freiburger FC *												16							1	30	43	66	20
1. Rödelheimer FC 02				16															1	30	40	73	17
Sportfreunde Stuttgart			20																1	38	30	100	14

Source: "Oberliga Süd". Das deutsche Fussball-Archiv.

- VfB Mühlburg and Phönix Karlsruhe merged in 1952 to form Karlsruher SC.
- * denotes club played in the Oberliga Südwest until 1950.

== Top scorers ==
The league's top scorers:

Year	Player	Club	Goals
1945–46	Robert Schlienz	VfB Stuttgart	45
1946–47	Hans Pöschl	1. FC Nürnberg	41
1947–48	Robert Schlienz	VfB Stuttgart	31
1948–49	Otto Thanner	TSV 1860 Munich	19
1948–49	Georg Herbold	SV Waldhof Mannheim	19
1948–49	Emil Maier	Kickers Offenbach	19
1949–50	Horst Schade	SpVgg Fürth	21
1950–51	Max Morlock	1. FC Nürnberg	28
1951–52	Max Morlock	1. FC Nürnberg	26
1952–53	Horst Schade	SpVgg Fürth	22
1953–54	Helmut Preisendörfer	Kickers Offenbach	22
1954–55	Ernst-Otto Meyer	VfR Mannheim	36
1955–56	Ernst-Otto Meyer	VfR Mannheim	30
1956–57	Heinz Beck	Karlsruher SC	34
1957–58	Siegfried Gast	Kickers Offenbach	20
1958–59	Ernst-Otto Meyer	VfR Mannheim	27
1959–60	Heinz Strehl	1. FC Nürnberg	30
1960–61	Rudolf Brunnenmeier	TSV 1860 Munich	23
1960–61	Erwin Stein	Eintracht Frankfurt	23
1961–62	Lothar Schämer	Eintracht Frankfurt	26
1962–63	Rudolf Brunnenmeier	TSV 1860 Munich	24
1962–63	Kurt Haseneder	1. FC Nürnberg	24
1962–63	Rainer Ohlhauser	FC Bayern Munich	24

Source: 50 Jahre Bayerischer Fussball–Verband. Vindelica Verlag. 1996. p. 189.
