= Grünauer BC =

German football club

- Full name: Grünauer Ballspielclub 1917 e.V.
- Nickname: GBC
- Founded: 1917
- Ground: Buntzelberg
- League: Bezirksliga Berlin Staffel 3 (VIII)
- 2015–16: 7th
Home colours	Away colours

Grünauer BC 1917 is a German association football club from Grünau in the Treptow-Köpenick district of the city of Berlin. The club was active under several different names in the separate East German football competition that emerged in the Soviet-occupied eastern half of the country after World War II.

== History ==
Parent club Grünauer Ballspielclub rose only as high as the 2. Kreisliga Berlin (III) in 1935 in pre-war Germany. Following the war, the former membership of the Grünauer side was first re-organized in 1945 as Sportgruppe Grünau. They played as part of the Stadtliga Berlin (I) for a single season in 1945–46 before merging with SG Bohnsdorf to form SG Falkenberg the following year. Through its history in East German competition the club underwent several name changes, becoming TSG Grünau-Bohnsdorf in June 1949, and then Sportgemeinschaft Grünau in 1950. Under that name the club played the 1951–52 season as part of the second division DDR-Liga. In 1952–53, they briefly joined SG Union Oberschöneweide to form SG Union Grünau-Oberschöneweide. The two clubs went their separate ways the next year with Grünau remaining largely out of sight in lower tier city competition until emerging in the II. DDR-Liga (III) in 1959.

In December 1961, SG was again renamed, becoming BSG Deutsche Lufthansa Berlin, a Betriebssportgemeinschaft associated with the aviation industry in the city. The club played two more seasons in third-tier football before being sent down following a 13th-place result in 1963. In 1955, 1962, and 1964, they took part in the opening round of the FDGB-Pokal (East German Cup).

After league restructuring in 1963, the team remained a third-tier side playing as either BSG Luftfahrt Berlin (1963–68, 1972–1989) or BSG Interflug Berlin (1969–71, 1990). The club finally reclaimed its historical identity as Grünauer BC 1917 in 1990 following the reunification of the country. The club remains active today as part of the tier eight Bezirksliga Berlin after relegation from the Landesliga Berlin in 2014.

== Honours ==
The club's honours:

- Bezirksliga Berlin (IV)
  - Champions: 1958
