= VfR Frankenthal =

German association football club from Frankenthal, Rhineland-Palatinate, Germany

- Full name: Verein für Rasenspiele 1900 Frankenthal e.V.
- Founded: June 22, 1900
- Ground: Ostparkstadion
- Chairman: Andreas Karg
- Coach: Karl-Heinz Bickert and Thorsten Jehn
- League: Bezirksliga Vorderpfalz
- Website: www.vfrfrankenthal.de
Home colours	Away colours

VfR Frankenthal (German: Verein für Rasenspiele 1900 Frankenthal e.V.) is a German sports club in Frankenthal, Rhineland-Palatinate, Germany.

== Creation ==
VfR Frankenthal was created through the mergers of several clubs. FC 1900 Frankenthal was the first club and was created on June 22, 1990. FC 1900 Frankenthal later became VfB 1900 and merged with FV Palatia 1902 to form FV 1900/02. FV 1900/02 then merged with fellow Frankenthal area club, FV Kickers 1914 to create VfR Frankenthal in 1937.

== History ==
VfR Frankenthal's first success was in 1939 when they were promoted to the Gauliga Südwest/Mainhessen. This league which was the top league of multiple states, provinces and areas between Prussia, France and Germany. They placed in the top 5 of the Gauliga Westmark in 1940, 1941 and 1944.

After World War II, they were placed in the Oberliga Südwest. They stayed for a season but were demoted to the amateur leagues until 1951. They then rejoined the Oberliga Südwest and memorably defeated 1. FC Kaiserslautern 1–0 on the last day of the season, costing them a spot in the championship.

VfR Frankenthal was involved in a bribery scandal during the 1951–1952 season. They lost their spot in the 1952–53 Oberliga and were replaced by BFV Hassia Bingen after a single game was played. They returned to the league for the 1953–1954 season and again upset 1. FC Kaiserslautern, in front of 16,000 fans, which was a VfR Frankenthal record. During the 1956–57 Oberliga season, Frankenthal came within 2 points of qualifying for the championship game.

VfR Frankenthal were relegated in 1961, but were promoted back in 1962. The Oberliga became the Regionalliga Südwest in 1963. WfR Frankenthal continued to play there and they were relegated in 1969. They were promoted back to the Regionalliga Südwest the next season but then were relegated to the amateur leagues again two years later. The club was relegated to the 1. Amateurliga Südwest and then joined the Verbandsliga Südwest when the 1. Amateurliga Südwest became extinct.

VfR Frankenthal has stayed in the Verbandsliga Südwest or lower since 1978 and have played in the Bezirksliga Vorderpfalz since 1999.

== Honors ==
- Verbandsliga Südwest

Champions: 1970

== Notable players and staff ==
- Paul Ehmann - He played for the club between 2004-2007 and later played for 1. FC Kaiserslautern.
- Alexander Esswein - He played for the club as a junior between 1998-1998 and became a regular player in the Bundesliga.
- Rudi Fischer - He played for the club prior to 1948 and later made appearances for 1. FC Nürnberg.
- Marco Haber - He played for the club's youth teams and later made appearances for the Germany national team.
- Willi Hölz - He played for the club as a youth player and later played for 1. FC Kaiserslautern
- Günter Jansen - He played for the club in 1952-1953 and was the goalie for the Borussia Mönchengladbach 1959–60 DFB-Pokal championship squad.
- Kurt Schreiner - He played for the club in 1940 and later played for the Germany national team
- Selim Teber - He played for the club from 1991 to 1998 as a youth player and later played for Eintracht Frankfurt
- Karl Wanger - He played for 1. FC Kaiserslautern from 1950 to 1957 then later played 100 games for VfR Frankenthal from 1957 to 1963.
- Paul Oßwald - He coached the club from 1935 to 1938 and later won the German championship as a manager with Eintracht Frankfurt in 1959.
