= BFC Nordstern =

German football club

- Full name: Berliner Fußball-Club Nordstern 1907 e.V.
- Founded: 1907
- Dissolved: 1973
Home colours	Away colours

BFC Nordstern was a German association football club from the city of Berlin. Established 1 June 1907, the club was active until 1973 when they became part of the tradition of present-day side SV Nord Wedding 1893.

== History ==
Nordstern played lower-tier football throughout its early history. In 1931, they were joined with Berliner FC Humboldt 1927 and two years later merged with Berliner FC Teutonia 1909 to form Spielverbindung Teutonia-Nordstern 07 Berlin.

After the end of World War II in 1945, Germany was occupied by the Allies and authorities banned organizations throughout the country, including sports and football clubs, a part of the process of de-Nazification. New clubs were soon formed and the former membership of Teutonia-Nordstern was re-organized as Sportgruppe Osloer Straße. They were part of the postwar Stadtliga Berlin in 1945–46 where they finished in second place in Staffel B, which qualified the club to play in the Oberliga Berlin (I) the next season. In October 1947, the club was renamed SG Nordstern Berlin and by 1949 had retaken its historical identity as BFC Nordstern. They played two seasons in the city's top competition until slipping into second class football.

Nordstern returned to the Oberliga after a second-place result in the Amateurliga Berlin (II) in 1951 and struggled through four seasons there as a lower table side. Sent down in 1955, the team was relegated again the next year. They made their way back to the Amateurliga in 1957 and remained a fixture there until being sent down after a 12th-place finish in 1972.

On 1 June 1973, they merged with VfL Nord Berlin to create Sportverein Nord-Nordstern. The club advanced to the Landesliga Berlin (IV) in 1982 for a two-season turn and, following German reunification in 1990, returned to a greatly enlarged Landesliga circuit to play three more seasons from 1992 to 1995. Nord-Nordstern joined longtime rival SC Rapide Wedding on 1 July 2001 to form SV Nord-Wedding 1893.
