= SC Staaken =

German association football club from Staaken, Berlin

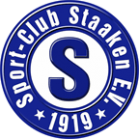
- Full name: Sports Club Staaken 1919 e. V
- Founded: 1919
- Ground: Sportpark Staaken
- Chairman: Klaus-Dieter Krebs
- League: NOFV-Oberliga Nord
- Website: https://www.sc-staaken.de/
Home colours	Away colours

SC Staaken (German: Sports Club Staaken 1919 e. V) is a German sports club in Staaken, Berlin, Germany. The club was founded in 1919.>

== History ==
The club was founded on 12 July 1919. During this time, Hans Berndt played for the club as a youth player. In 1937, the club merged with MTV 1906 Staaken and formed TSV Staaken 1906. The club then merged again in 1942 with BSG Klüssendorf and formed KSG Staaken/Klüssendorf until the end of World War II.

After the war ended in 1945, Lufthansa SG Berlin dissolved and joined the team to create SG Staaken. The team was able to win Group C of the 1945–46 Oberliga Berlin, but finished in 3rd place behind SG Wilmersdorf and SG Prenzlauer Berg-West in the championship stage. They stayed in the league for another season but were relegated to the 1. Amateurliga.

The club split in 1948 and parts of the club became MTV 06 Staaken. SC Staaken then spent many years in the Regionalliga Berlin and the amateur leagues. The club made it to the 4th round of the 1981/1982 Berliner Landespokal but were defeated by FC Wacker Lankwitz, 5–0. The club earned promotion to what is now called the Berlin-Liga in 1986 and were eventually relegated to the 7th tier Landesliga Berlin. Staaken fought off relegation in 2014. In 2017, they earned promotion into the 5th tier league, NOFV-Oberliga. Jeffrey Seitz was the coach of the title winning team and earned the "Best Coach" award for his efforts. The club won the Bürgermeisterpokal (Mayor's Cup) in 2018 and 2019. In December 2022, the club made over 800,000 euros worth of renovations to their field to accommodate their 40+ teams and to be able to meet the requirements for higher levels of play. As of January 2023, the club currently competes in the NOFV-Oberliga Nord.

== Other information ==
Staaken also has a cheerleading department, which won multiple titles in the 2022 German Championships. The team competed in the 2022 Cheerleading World Championship.

The club's main rival is SC Gatow and games between them are known as the "Bezirksderby".

In May 2022, the club was involved in an unusual incident when the father of an opposing team's player choked an SC Staaken youth player and threatened him with a knife during a game.

== Honors ==
- Berlin-Liga

Champions:2017

- Bürgermeisterpokal

Champions: 2018 and 2019

== Notable players and staff ==
- Hans Berndt - He played for SC Staaken from 1924 to 1936. He then went on to play for VfB Königsberg, Tennis Borussia Berlin and the Germany youth team.
- Marvin Knoll - He played for the club as a youth. He made appearances for Hertha BSC and the Germany national youth football teams.
- Maximilian Mittelstädt - He played for the club as a youth. He then player over 130 games for Hertha BSC and was in the Germany national youth football teams (U19, U20 and U21).
- Manuel Schmiedebach - He played for the club as a youth. He made appearances for Hertha BSC and the Germany national youth football teams.
- Julian Eitschberger - He played for the club as a youth and later played for Hertha BSC and the Germany national youth football teams.
- Tim Maciejewski - He played for the club as a youth and later played in the Bundesliga for 1. FC Union Berlin.
- Oliver Holzbecher - He played for the club as a youth and later played for Hertha BSC and the West Germany national youth teams.
- Ralf Lehmann - He played for the club as a youth and later played for the Germany national youth teams.

== In popular culture ==
SC Staaken has been featured in the video game series, Football Manager since 2015.
