= Oberliga Südwest (1945–1963) =

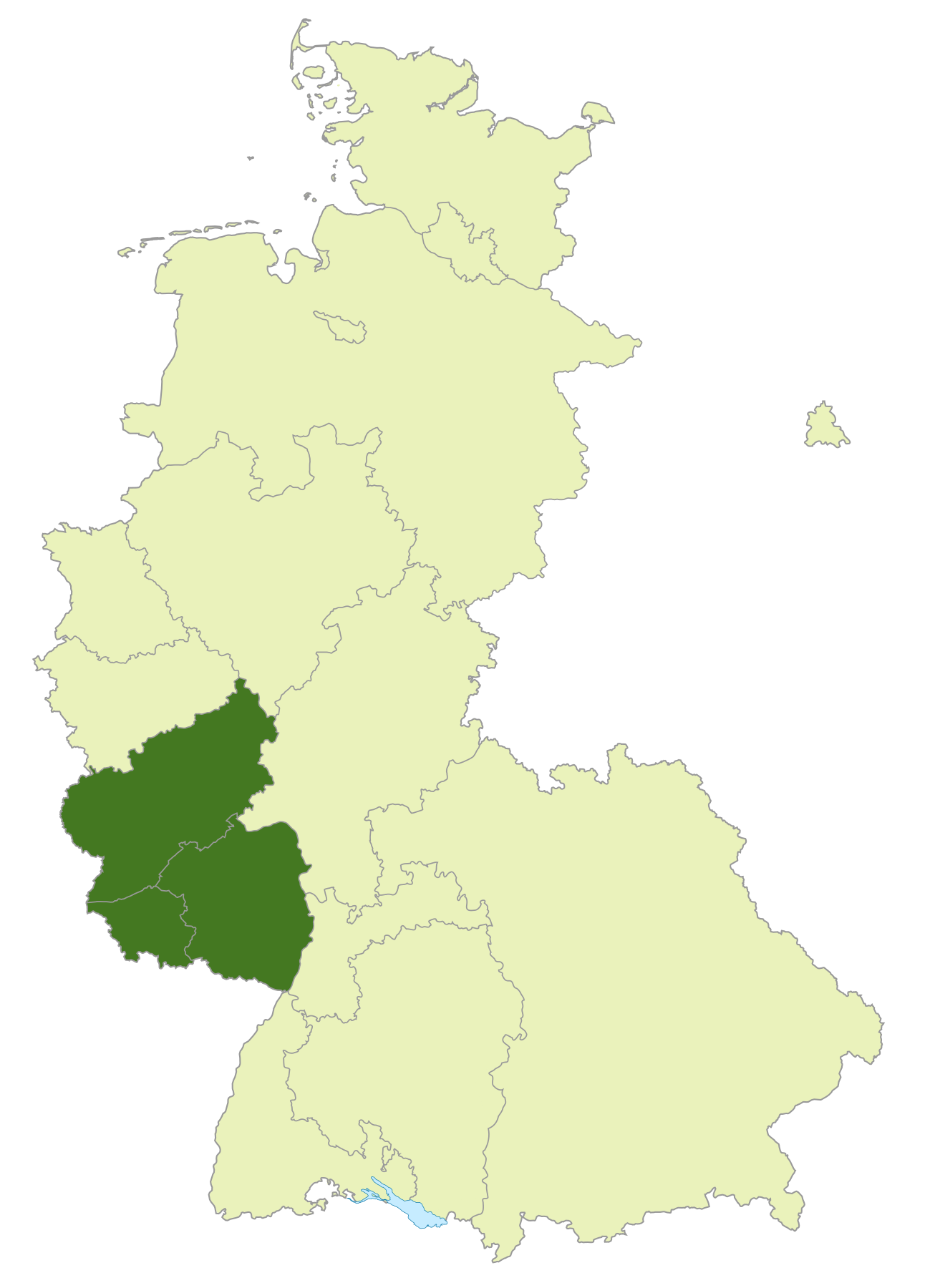
- Founded: 1945
- Folded: 1963 (18 seasons)
- Replaced by: Bundesliga
- Country: Germany
- State: Rhineland-Palatinate; Saarland
- Level on pyramid: Level 1
- Relegation to: 2. Oberliga Südwest
- Last champions: 1. FC Kaiserslautern; (1962–63)

The Oberliga Südwest (English: Premier league Southwest) was the highest level of the German football league system in the southwest of Germany from 1945 until the formation of the Bundesliga in 1963. It covered the two states of Rhineland-Palatinate and Saarland.

== Overview ==
The league was introduced as the highest level of football in the French occupation zone in 1945, replacing the Gauligas as such. As was the French occupation zone, the Oberliga was split into a northern and a southern zone. The northern zone continued till 1963 to form the Oberliga Südwest while the southern zone was integrated into the Oberliga Süd in 1950. Until then, the champion of the Oberliga was determined by a home-and-away final between the two group winners.

The clubs in the Oberliga Süd came from the following Gauligas:

- Gauliga Westmark
- Gauliga Moselland
- Gauliga Baden (southern half only)

In addition to the Oberliga Südwest, four other Oberligas were formed in Germany in the 1940s.

- Oberliga West (formed in 1947)
- Oberliga Nord (formed in 1947)
- Oberliga Berlin (formed in 1945, originally with clubs from west and east Berlin)
- Oberliga Süd (formed in 1945)

Next to the Oberliga Berlin, the Oberliga Südwest was the smallest of the five Oberligas. It won two German titles through the 1. FC Kaiserslautern, led by the German captain Fritz Walter, still a legend in Kaiserslautern and Germany.

Set below the Oberliga were originally the Amateurligas. In 1951 the 2. Oberliga Südwest was formed to fit in between.

With the reintroduction of the German championship in 1948, the winner and runners-up of the Oberliga Südwest went on to the finals tournament with the other Oberliga champions.

In 1950, the southern group of the Oberliga Südwest was disbanded and its clubs joined the Southern German Football Association.

From 1948 to 1951 the clubs from the Saarland did not take part in the Oberliga Südwest, playing their own competition instead. The 1. FC Saarbrücken even took part in the French second division in 1948–49, winning the division but being refused further participation.

The 1. FC Kaiserslautern, Wormatia Worms and 1. FSV Mainz 05 took part in all of the 18 seasons of the Oberliga Südwest.

In 1978, the Oberliga Südwest was reformed, as the third tier of German football, but still covering the same region. From the clubs that played the last season in 1963, the 1. FSV Mainz 05, FK Pirmasens, SV Südwest Ludwigshafen, TuS Neuendorf and Eintracht Bad Kreuznach also saw the first season of the new league.

== Founding members of the Oberliga Südwest (northern group) ==
- 1. FC Saarbrücken
- 1. FC Kaiserslautern
- Borussia Neunkirchen
- Wormatia Worms
- VfR Frankenthal
- FK Pirmasens
- Phönix Ludwigshafen
- 1. FC Idar
- BFV Hassia Bingen
- 1. FSV Mainz 05

== Disbanding of the Oberliga ==
With the introduction of the Bundesliga, two teams from the Oberliga Südwest were admitted to the new Bundesliga. The remaining clubs went to the new Regionalliga Südwest together with six clubs from the 2nd Oberliga Südwest, one of five new second divisions.

While the admittance of the 1. FC Kaiserslautern as the most prolific team of the Oberliga and champion of 1963 was logical, the pick of the 1. FC Saarbrücken was more than dubious, having only finished fifth in the Oberliga that year and coming in below the other Saarland side, Borussia Neunkirchen.

== Qualifying for the Bundesliga ==
The qualifying system for the new league was fairly complex. The league placings of the clubs playing in the Oberligen for the last ten seasons were taken into consideration, whereby results from 1952 to 1955 counted once, results from 1955 to 1959 counted double and results from 1959 to 1963 triple. A first-place finish was awarded 16 points, a sixteenth place one point. Appearances in the German championship or DFB-Pokal finals were also rewarded with points. The five Oberliga champions of the 1962–63 season were granted direct access to the Bundesliga. All up, 46 clubs applied for the 16 available Bundesliga slots.

Following this system, by 11 January 1963, the DFB announced nine fixed clubs for the new league and reduced the clubs eligible for the remaining seven places to 20. Clubs within the same Oberliga that were separated by less than 50 points were considered on equal rank and the 1962-63 placing was used to determine the qualified team.

Of the seven clubs from the league applying, the 1. FC Saarbrücken qualified early even though FK Pirmasens and Borussia Neunkirchen were less than ten points behind in the overall ranking and finished better in 1962–63. The rumor persists that Saarbrücken was chosen because it was from the home state of the later DFB chairman Hermann Neuberger (Chairman from 1975 to 1992), an influential figure in German football. The DFB justified the choice of the 1. FCS with the fact that the club had a superior infrastructure to the other two. The 1. FC Kaiserslautern also qualified.

Points table:

Rank	Club	Points 1952 to 1963	Place in 1962–63
1	1. FC Kaiserslautern ^{2}	464	1
2	1. FC Saarbrücken ^{1}	384	5
3	FK Pirmasens ^{2}	382	3
4	Borussia Neunkirchen ^{2}	376	2
5	Wormatia Worms ^{3}	278	4
6	Saar 05 Saarbrücken ^{3}	229	9
7	Sportfreunde Saarbrücken ^{4}	160	6

- Source: DSFS Liga-Chronik (in German), page: B 12, accessed: 4 November 2008
- Bold Denotes club qualified for the new Bundesliga.
- ^{1} Denotes club was one of the nine selected on 11 January 1963.
- ^{2} Denotes club was one of the 20 taken into final selection.
- ^{3} Denotes club was one of the 15 applicants which were removed from final selection.
- ^{4} Denotes club withdrew Bundesliga application.

== Honours ==
The winners and runners-up of the Oberliga Südwest:

**Season**	**Winner**	**Runner-Up**
1945–46	1. FC Saarbrücken	1. FC Kaiserslautern
1946–47	1. FC Kaiserslautern	Wormatia Worms
1947–48	1. FC Kaiserslautern	FC Rastatt 04
1948–49	1. FC Kaiserslautern	Wormatia Worms
1949–50	1. FC Kaiserslautern	Wormatia Worms
1950–51	**1. FC Kaiserslautern**	Wormatia Worms
1951–52	1. FC Saarbrücken	TuS Neuendorf
1952–53	**1. FC Kaiserslautern**	TuS Neuendorf
1953–54	1. FC Kaiserslautern	FK Pirmasens
1954–55	1. FC Kaiserslautern	Wormatia Worms
1955–56	1. FC Kaiserslautern	TuS Neuendorf
1956–57	1. FC Kaiserslautern	1. FC Saarbrücken
1957–58	FK Pirmasens	1. FC Kaiserslautern
1958–59	FK Pirmasens	Borussia Neunkirchen
1959–60	FK Pirmasens	Borussia Neunkirchen
1960–61	1. FC Saarbrücken	Borussia Neunkirchen
1961–62	Borussia Neunkirchen	FK Pirmasens
1962–63	1. FC Kaiserslautern	Borussia Neunkirchen

- **Bold** denotes team went on to win German Championship.

== Placings & all-time table of the Oberliga Südwest ==
The final placings and all-time table of the northern group of the Oberliga Südwest:

Club	46	47	48	49	50	51	52	53	54	55	56	57	58	59	60	61	62	63	S	G	GF	GA	Points
1. FC Kaiserslautern	2	1	1	1	1	1	3	1	1	1	1	1	2	3	5	4	4	1	18	498	1870	579	784
FK Pirmasens	6		7	4	4	3	5	7	2	5	4	8	1	1	1	3	2	3	17	484	1209	707	641
Wormatia Worms	4	2	5	2	2	2	4	4	11	2	11	9	5	14	7	7	5	4	18	498	1152	802	591
1. FC Saarbrücken *	1	3	2	SL	SL	SL	1	3	5	3	3	2	8	4	3	1	3	5	15	418	1125	595	573
TuS Neuendorf		7	3	3	3	5	2	2	3	4	2	6	11	15		11	12	10	16	450	1066	719	532
Borussia Neunkirchen *	3	6	4	SL	SL	SL	7	6	8	10	6	5	3	2	2	2	1	2	15	418	1009	633	519
1. FSV Mainz 05	10	4	8	8	11	12	10	8	7	14	10	10	6	11	12	5	10	12	18	498	802	1078	432
Phönix Ludwigshafen	7	5	10	6	5	4	8	12	6	6	7	4	4	5	4	10	16		17	418	843	834	386
Eintracht Trier				7	12	6	6	13	10	11	12	12	14	8	14	13	15		14	410	630	852	348
Saar 05 Saarbrücken *			9	SL	SL	SL		9	4	9	9	7	9	9	9	8	9	9	12	356	660	723	337
TuRa Ludwigshafen						10	9	5	12	7	16		10	13	8	9	6	8	12	356	570	681	324
VfR Frankenthal	5						13		9	8	5	3	12	7	11	15		11	11	318	518	610	297
VfR Kaiserslautern					9	9	12	11	14	12	13	13	15		15		14	13	12	356	520	777	269
Eintracht Bad Kreuznach						11	15			13	8	11	7	10	13	12	13	15	11	326	480	702	262
Sportfreunde Saarbrücken *				SL	SL	SL				16		16		6	10	6	8	6	7	210	362	488	175
FV Speyer								10	13	15		14	13	12	16				7	210	287	447	157
VfL Neustadt			6	5	7	8	14												5	135	213	292	133
Ludwigshafener SC															6	14	7	7	4	120	200	205	121
FV Engers					10	7	11	15			15								5	146	264	378	116
SpVgg Andernach			14	11	8	14					14	15							6	166	257	452	102
BSC Oppau				10	14												11	14	4	114	156	279	78
ASV Landau					6	13			15										3	86	103	236	61
SV Weisenau				9	13		16							16					4	114	172	365	57
VfR Kirn					16			14	16										3	90	117	276	48
FSV Trier-Kürenz		8	13	12	15														4	94	99	353	41
SV Niederlahnstein																16		16	2	60	59	219	20
SV St. Ingbert													16						1	30	42	106	16
SV Gonsenheim			11	13															2	50	47	205	16
BFV Hassia Bingen	9							16											2	48	59	213	14
1. FC Idar	8																		1	18	31	74	11
SV Röchling Völklingen *			12	SL	SL	SL													1	26	31	89	10

Source:"Oberliga Südwest". Das deutsche Fussball-Archiv.

Source:"Overall table Oberliga Südwest". FSV Mainz 05.

- * Denotes clubs from Saarland, which did not take part in the competition from 1948 to 1951.

== Placings in the Oberliga Südwest (southern group) ==
The final placings of the southern group of the Oberliga Südwest:

Club	1947	1948	1949	1950
SSV Reutlingen	2	7	6	1
SV Tübingen			2	2
Freiburger FC		5	1	3
FC Singen 04		3	4	4
VfL Konstanz	1	4	8	5
FV Kuppenheim				6
TV Ebingen				7
FC Rastatt 04	5	1	5	8
FC 08 Villingen			3	9
FV Lahr				10
Offenburger FV	4	2	12	11
SC Freiburg	7	9	9	12
VfL Schwenningen	6	6	7	13
VfB Friedrichshafen	3	8	10	14
SV Trossingen		11		15
SV Hechingen				16
TG Biberach	8	10	11	
SV Laupheim		12		

Source:"Oberliga Südwest". Das deutsche Fussball-Archiv.

- Until 1949, clubs in this league were not permitted to carry their pre-war name. Names given are the ones carried after 1949.
