= SG Stadtmitte Berlin =

German football club

- Full name: Sportgruppe Stadtmitte
- Founded: 1945
- Dissolved: 1947
Home colours	Away colours

SG Stadtmitte Berlin was a short-lived German association football club from the city of Berlin and play its home fixtures at Chausseestraße. Established in 1945, it was part of the postwar Stadtliga Berlin which was the top-flight city competition active immediately after World War II. They earned a second-place result in the league's Staffel D in 1945–46 and the following season became part of the Oberliga Berlin (I). The club disappeared in 1947 following an 11th-place result there.
