= Berliner FC Alemannia 1890 =

German football club

BFC Alemannia 1890
- Full name: Berliner Fußballclub Alemannia 1890 e. V.
- Founded: 1890
- Ground: Wackerplatz
- Capacity: 5,000
- Chairman: Bernd Gehrig
- Manager: Detlef Diehle
- League: Kreisliga A Berlin Staffel 1 (IX)
- 2015–16: 5th
- Website: bfc-alemannia-1890.de
| Home colours | Away colours |

Berliner FC Alemannia 1890 is a German football club based in northern Berlin. The club was founded in 1890 as Berliner Thor- und Fussball Club Allemannia 1890. In 1994, the club saw an influx of members from SC Wacker 04 Berlin, which had folded, and took the name BFC Alemannia 90 Wacker. However, in 2013 they returned to their original name.

== History ==
BTuFC Allemannia was founded early in 1890 as SV Jugendlust 1890 Berlin before changing their name in February. They were also briefly partnered with Tambour-Verein Wanderlust that year. Sometime in the 1890s they adopted the name BFC Allemannia 90 Berlin. Initially the club played cricket which, alongside football and rugby, were English sports becoming popular in continental Europe at the time. A football department quickly developed, and the team played in Berlin's earliest leagues, becoming one of the founding clubs of the DFB (German Football Association) in Leipzig in 1900.

From 1903 to 1911 the team played in the Märkischer Fußball-Bund where they captured league titles in 1905 and 1907. Through the 1920s, Allemannia played in the first division Oberliga Berlin-Brandenburg, winning the division in 1924 by defeating Norden-Nordwest Berlin, and then losing their defence of their title to Hertha BSC the following year. The club advanced to the German championship rounds in both seasons, only to be put out in the early going. By 1929 their performance had slipped, and they were relegated.

In 1933, Allemannia became Alemannia. They did not qualify to play in the new first division Gauligen formed that year in the re-organization of German football under the Third Reich and remained out of top-flight competition for the duration of World War II. After the war, Allied occupation of Germany ordered most organizations in the country disbanded, including sports and football clubs, as part of the process of denazification. The formation of new clubs was permitted late in 1945, and the membership of Alemannia was re-organized as Spoergemeinde Prenzlauer Berg West. This team appeared in the new Oberliga Berlin (I) and by 1947–48 was once again playing as Alemannia 90 Berlin. They played out their turn in the first division as a mid-table side until relegated in 1956, followed by a single season re-appearance that ended in a last-place finish in 1957–58. The club slipped briefly to fourth division play before playing in the Regionalliga Berlin (II) and Amateurliga Berlin (III) from the mid-1960s to the mid-1970s. By the time of the demise of Wacker in 1994, Alemannia had fallen to the fifth tier Landesliga Berlin.

Wacker's financial collapse saw many of the club's members join Alemannia, leading to renaming as BFC Alemannia 90 Wacker. The newly combined side played in the Landesliga Berlin (V) and enjoyed a brief surge of success, moving from the lower half of the table to two consecutive second-place finishes. Alemannia Wacker has since faded but continued to play in the Verbandsliga Berlin as a mid-table side until its relegation in 2008. In 2013 they took back their original name. They played in the Bezirksliga Berlin (VIII) after their relegation from Landesliga Berlin (VII) in 2014, and slipped again in 2015 to the Kreisliga A (IX).

== Honours ==
The club's honours:

- Brandenburg football championship (I)
  - Champions: 1924
  - Runners-up: 1925
- Amateur-Oberliga Berlin
  - Champions: 1957, 1970
- Berliner Landespokal
  - Runners-up: 1949, 2005

== Thorball ==
- Thorball or Torball was a German word in use in the 1890s and early 1900s for the sport of cricket. Several early clubs playing the new "English" games of football, rugby, and cricket incorporated it into their name. The term never caught on and did not enter into common usage, soon being abandoned by sports clubs. Today torball may refer to a form of football played by the blind or vision-impaired.
