= 1952–53 Oberliga =

Oberliga
- Season: 1952–53
- Champions: Hamburger SV Union 06 Berlin Borussia Dortmund: 1. FC Kaiserslautern; Eintracht Frankfurt
- Relegated: Concordia Hamburg Eintracht Osnabrück BFC Südring SC Südwest Berlin Hertha BSC Berlin Sportfreunde Katernberg SpVgg Erkenschwick FV Engers BFV Hassia Bingen VfR Mannheim Stuttgarter Kickers
- German champions: 1. FC Kaiserslautern; 2nd German title
- Top goalscorer: Fritz Walter (38 goals)

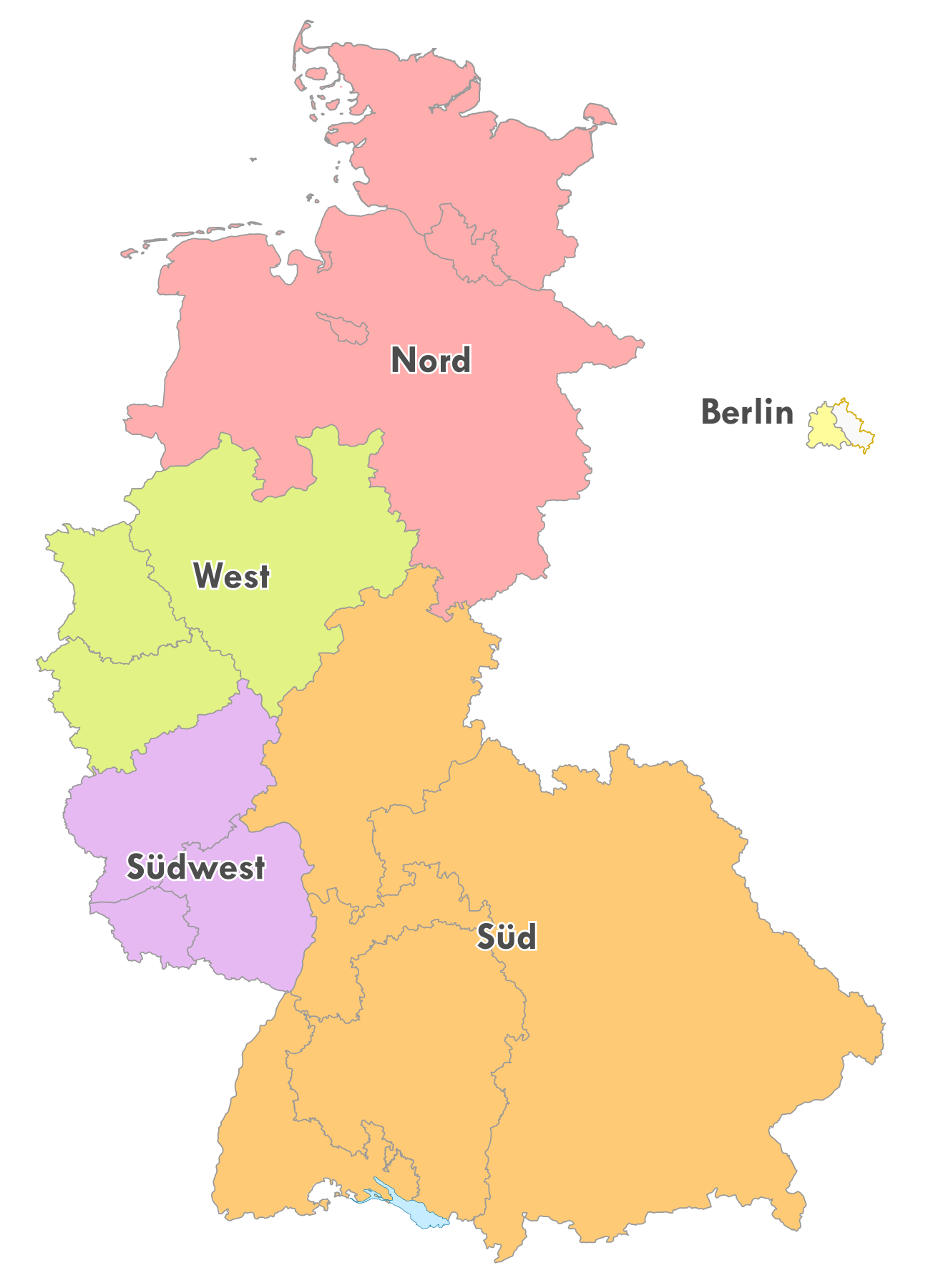
Map of the five German Oberligas 1945 to 1963

The 1952–53 Oberliga was the eighth season of the Oberliga, the first tier of the football league system in West Germany and the Saar Protectorate. The league operated in five regional divisions, Berlin, North, South, Southwest and West. The five league champions and the runners-up from the south, north and west then entered the 1953 German football championship which was won by 1. FC Kaiserslautern. It was 1. FC Kaiserslautern's second national championship, having previously won it in 1951.

1. FC Köln set a new Oberliga start record in 1952–53, winning its first eleven games, a mark later equaled by Hannover 96 in 1953–54 and Hamburger SV in 1961–62 but never surpassed.

A similar-named league, the DDR-Oberliga, existed in East Germany, set at the first tier of the East German football league system. The 1952–53 DDR-Oberliga was won by Dynamo Dresden.

== Oberliga Nord ==
The 1952–53 season saw three new clubs in the league, FC Altona 93, Harburger TB and VfB Lübeck, all promoted from the Amateurliga. The league's top scorer was Günter Schlegel of Göttingen 05 with 26 goals.

Pos	Team	Pld	W	D	L	GF	GA	GD	Pts	Promotion, qualification or relegation
1	Hamburger SV	30	18	7	5	78	57	+21	43	Qualification to German championship
2	Holstein Kiel	30	15	9	6	66	38	+28	39	Qualification to German championship
3	Werder Bremen	30	15	7	8	71	55	+16	37	
4	VfL Osnabrück	30	15	5	10	66	47	+19	35	
5	Göttingen 05	30	13	6	11	73	57	+16	32	
6	FC Altona 93	30	13	6	11	73	69	+4	32	
7	Hannover 96	30	10	10	10	52	53	−1	30	
8	TuS Bremerhaven 93	30	9	11	10	50	60	−10	29	
9	FC St. Pauli	30	11	6	13	62	57	+5	28	
10	Eimsbütteler TV	30	12	4	14	59	62	−3	28	
11	VfB Lübeck	30	9	10	11	46	63	−17	28	
12	Arminia Hannover	30	9	9	12	51	62	−11	27	
13	Bremer SV	30	12	2	16	65	71	−6	26	
14	Harburger TB	30	11	2	17	47	71	−24	24	
15	Concordia Hamburg (R)	30	8	7	15	47	62	−15	23	Relegation to Amateurliga
16	Eintracht Osnabrück (R)	30	5	9	16	54	76	−22	19	Relegation to Amateurliga

Source: RSSSF.com
Rules for classification: 1) Points;
(R) Relegated

== Oberliga Berlin ==
The 1952–53 season saw two new clubs in the league, BFC Südring and SC Südwest Berlin, both promoted from the Amateurliga Berlin. The league's top scorer was Alfred Herrmann of Minerva 93 Berlin with 17 goals.

Pos	Team	Pld	W	D	L	GF	GA	GD	Pts	Promotion, qualification or relegation
1	Union 06 Berlin	24	17	6	1	57	26	+31	40	Qualification to German championship
2	Spandauer SV	24	14	3	7	53	23	+30	31	
3	Tennis Borussia Berlin	24	12	7	5	46	29	+17	31	
4	Viktoria 89 Berlin	24	11	6	7	62	41	+21	28	
5	Berliner SV 92	24	12	4	8	56	39	+17	28	
6	Blau-Weiß 90 Berlin	24	12	2	10	54	44	+10	26	
7	Alemannia 90 Berlin	24	10	5	9	44	37	+7	25	
8	Minerva 93 Berlin	24	9	5	10	45	48	−3	23	
9	Wacker 04 Berlin	24	8	5	11	42	43	−1	21	
10	BFC Nordstern	24	5	9	10	37	56	−19	19	
11	BFC Südring (R)	24	5	6	13	30	60	−30	16	Relegation to Amateurliga Berlin
12	SC Südwest Berlin (R)	24	3	6	15	32	64	−32	12	Relegation to Amateurliga Berlin
13	Hertha BSC Berlin (R)	24	3	6	15	32	79	−47	12	Relegation to Amateurliga Berlin

Source: RSSSF.com
Rules for classification: 1) Points;
(R) Relegated

== Oberliga West ==
The 1952–53 season saw two new clubs in the league, SV Sodingen and Borussia München-Gladbach, both promoted from the 2. Oberliga West. The league's top scorer was Hans Schäfer of 1. FC Köln with 26 goals.

Pos	Team	Pld	W	D	L	GF	GA	GD	Pts	Promotion, qualification or relegation
1	Borussia Dortmund	30	20	6	4	87	36	+51	46	Qualification to German championship
2	1. FC Köln	30	19	5	6	86	42	+44	43	Qualification to German championship
3	Rot-Weiß Essen	30	18	4	8	86	40	+46	40	
4	Meidericher SV	30	15	6	9	63	51	+12	36	
5	Alemannia Aachen	30	14	6	10	61	57	+4	34	
6	FC Schalke 04	30	14	5	11	67	49	+18	33	
7	Preußen Münster	30	12	8	10	74	60	+14	32	
8	Preußen Dellbrück	30	12	7	11	52	39	+13	31	
9	Fortuna Düsseldorf	30	14	2	14	68	60	+8	30	
10	Bayer Leverkusen	30	10	9	11	50	68	−18	29	
11	SV Sodingen	30	7	11	12	47	54	−7	25	
12	STV Horst-Emscher	30	9	5	16	42	73	−31	23	
13	Schwarz-Weiß Essen	30	9	4	17	54	76	−22	22	
14	Borussia München-Gladbach	30	7	7	16	31	80	−49	21	
15	Sportfreunde Katernberg (R)	30	7	5	18	57	91	−34	19	Relegation to 2. Oberliga West
16	SpVgg Erkenschwick (R)	30	6	4	20	41	90	−49	16	Relegation to 2. Oberliga West

Source: RSSSF.com
Rules for classification: 1) Points;
(R) Relegated

== Oberliga Südwest ==
The 1952–53 season saw four new clubs in the league, BFV Hassia Bingen, FV Speyer and VfR Kirn, all promoted from the 2. Oberliga Südwest while Saar 05 Saarbrücken was promoted from the Amateurliga Saarland. The league's top scorer was Fritz Walter of 1. FC Kaiserslautern with 38 goals, the highest total for the five Oberligas in 1952–53.

Pos	Team	Pld	W	D	L	GF	GA	GD	Pts	Promotion, qualification or relegation
1	1. FC Kaiserslautern (C)	30	23	5	2	127	31	+96	51	Qualification to German championship
2	TuS Neuendorf	30	21	4	5	97	28	+69	46	
3	1. FC Saarbrücken	30	22	2	6	89	39	+50	46	
4	Wormatia Worms	30	16	5	9	85	58	+27	37	
5	TuRa Ludwigshafen	30	12	10	8	57	47	+10	34	
6	Borussia Neunkirchen	30	12	7	11	36	46	−10	31	
7	FK Pirmasens	30	12	6	12	64	56	+8	30	
8	FSV Mainz 05	30	12	6	12	59	55	+4	30	
9	Saar 05 Saarbrücken	30	12	4	14	54	62	−8	28	
10	FV Speyer	30	10	8	12	33	39	−6	28	
11	VfR Kaiserslautern	30	12	3	15	55	72	−17	27	
12	Phönix Ludwigshafen	30	9	6	15	44	68	−24	24	
13	Eintracht Trier	30	10	3	17	43	66	−23	23	
14	VfR Kirn	30	9	4	17	41	73	−32	22	
15	FV Engers (R)	30	7	6	17	46	81	−35	20	Relegation to 2. Oberliga Südwest
16	BFV Hassia Bingen (Note: BFV Hassia Bingen was promoted to the Oberliga because VfR Frankenthal was retrospectively relegated from the league after the first round of the 1952–53 season for attempting to bribe 1. FC Saarbrücken to lose their game against Frankenthal during the 1951–52 season.) (R)	30	0	3	27	32	141	−109	3	Relegation to 2. Oberliga Südwest

Source: RSSSF.com
Rules for classification: 1) Points;
(C) Champions; (R) Relegated

== Oberliga Süd ==
The 1952–53 season saw two new clubs in the league, TSG Ulm 1846 and BC Augsburg, both promoted from the 2. Oberliga Süd. The league's top scorer was Horst Schade of SpVgg Fürth with 22 goals.

Pos	Team	Pld	W	D	L	GF	GA	GD	Pts	Promotion, qualification or relegation
1	Eintracht Frankfurt	30	16	7	7	62	49	+13	39	Qualification to German championship
2	VfB Stuttgart	30	15	8	7	69	33	+36	38	Qualification to German championship
3	SpVgg Fürth	30	12	11	7	65	45	+20	35	
4	Karlsruher SC	30	15	4	11	68	52	+16	34	
5	FC Schweinfurt 05	30	12	8	10	40	51	−11	32	
6	Kickers Offenbach	30	11	8	11	61	53	+8	30	
7	FC Bayern Munich	30	12	6	12	59	56	+3	30	
8	1. FC Nürnberg	30	11	7	12	67	61	+6	29	
9	SV Waldhof Mannheim	30	13	3	14	56	62	−6	29	
10	BC Augsburg	30	13	2	15	59	61	−2	28	
11	FSV Frankfurt	30	9	10	11	38	44	−6	28	
12	Viktoria Aschaffenburg	30	11	6	13	59	74	−15	28	
13	VfR Mannheim	30	9	9	12	46	59	−13	27	
14	Stuttgarter Kickers	30	10	6	14	65	69	−4	26	
15	TSV 1860 München (R)	30	6	12	12	46	58	−12	24	Relegation to 2. Oberliga Süd
16	TSG Ulm 1846 (R)	30	7	7	16	41	74	−33	21	Relegation to 2. Oberliga Süd

Source: RSSSF.com
Rules for classification: 1) Points;
(R) Relegated

== German championship ==
The 1953 German football championship was contested by the eight qualified Oberliga teams and won by 1. FC Kaiserslautern, defeating VfB Stuttgart in the final. The eight clubs played a home-and-away round of matches in two groups of four. The two group winners then advanced to the final.

=== Group 1 ===
Pos	Team	Pld	W	D	L	GF	GA	GD	Pts	Promotion, qualification or relegation	KAI	EF	KOL	HK
1	1. FC Kaiserslautern (Q)	6	5	1	0	16	7	+9	11	Qualified to final	—	5–1	2–2	2–1
2	Eintracht Frankfurt	6	3	1	2	8	7	+1	7		0–1	—	2–0	4–1
3	1. FC Köln	6	1	3	2	8	10	−2	5		1–2	0–0	—	3–2
4	Holstein Kiel	6	0	1	5	8	16	−8	1		2–4	0–1	2–2	—

Source: RSSSF.com
Rules for classification: 1) Points;
(Q) Qualified for the phase indicated

=== Group 2 ===
Pos	Team	Pld	W	D	L	GF	GA	GD	Pts	Promotion, qualification or relegation	VFB	BD	HSV	UB
1	VfB Stuttgart (Q)	6	5	0	1	16	6	+10	10	Qualified to final	—	2–1	2–1	6–0
2	Borussia Dortmund	6	5	0	1	17	7	+10	10		2–1	—	4–1	4–0
3	Hamburger SV	6	1	1	4	11	15	−4	3		1–2	3–4	—	3–1
4	SC Union 06 Berlin	6	0	1	5	4	20	−16	1		1–3	0–2	2–2	—

Source: RSSSF.com
Rules for classification: 1) Points;
(Q) Qualified for the phase indicated

=== Final ===
Team 1	Score	Team 2
1. FC Kaiserslautern	4–1	VfB Stuttgart
