= Karl Adam =

Karl Adam may refer to:

- Karl Adam (footballer) (1924–1999), German footballer
- Karl Adam (rowing coach) (1912–1976), German rowing coach
- Karl Adam (theologian) (1876–1966), German Catholic theologian
- Karl Ferdinand Adam (1806–1868), German composer and music director

== See also ==
- Karl Adams (disambiguation)
- Carl Adams (disambiguation)
