= 1951 German football championship =

1951 German championship
Deutsche Fußballmeisterschaft

Tournament details
- Country: West Germany
- Dates: 6 May – 30 June
- Teams: 8

Final positions
- Champions: 1. FC Kaiserslautern; 1st German title
- Runners-up: Preußen Münster

Tournament statistics
- Matches played: 25
- Goals scored: 99 (3.96 per match)
- Top goal scorer(s): Werner Baßler; Horst Eckel; Adolf Kallenborn; Konrad Winterstein (6 goals each)

The 1951 German football championship was the culmination of the football season in the West Germany in 1950–51. 1. FC Kaiserslautern were crowned champions for the first time after a group stage and a final.

== Qualified teams ==
The teams qualified through the 1950–51 Oberliga season:

Club	Qualified from
Hamburger SV	Oberliga Nord champions
FC St. Pauli	Oberliga Nord runners-up
Schalke 04	Oberliga West champions
Preußen Münster	Oberliga West runners-up
1. FC Kaiserslautern	Oberliga Südwest champions
1. FC Nürnberg	Oberliga Süd champions
SpVgg Fürth	Oberliga Süd runners-up
Tennis Borussia Berlin	Oberliga Berlin champions

== Competition ==
=== Group 1 ===
Pos	Team	Pld	W	D	L	GF	GA	GR	Pts	Qualification	FCK	S04	FUE	STP
1	1. FC Kaiserslautern	6	4	1	1	14	8	1.750	9	Advance to final	—	1–0	2–2	2–0
2	Schalke 04	6	3	1	2	7	6	1.167	7		3–2	—	2–1	1–2
3	SpVgg Fürth	6	1	2	3	8	9	0.889	4		1–3	0–0	—	4–1
4	FC St. Pauli	6	2	0	4	6	12	0.500	4		2–4	0–1	1–0	—

Source: RSSSF
Rules for classification: 1) Points; 2) Goal ratio.

6 May 1951	1. FC Kaiserslautern	2 – 2	SpVgg Fürth	Ludwigshafen
	Eckel 13', 71'		Helbig 47'; Nöth 65'	Stadium: Südweststadion; Attendance: 65,000; Referee: Kormannshaus (Gohfeld)

6 May 1951	Schalke 04	1 – 2	FC St. Pauli	Gelsenkirchen
	Kleina 36'		Haß 53'; Kruppa 80'	Stadium: Glückauf-Kampfbahn; Attendance: 30,000; Referee: Zacher (Berlin)

13 May 1951	FC St. Pauli	2 – 4	1. FC Kaiserslautern	Hamburg
	Boller 30' (pen.); Kruppa 81'		Baßler 10', 17'; Wanger 80'; F. Walter 88'	Stadium: Millerntor-Stadion; Attendance: 30,000

13 May 1951	SpVgg Fürth	0 – 0	Schalke 04	Fürth
				Stadium: Sportpark Ronhof; Attendance: 22,000

20 May 1951	1. FC Kaiserslautern	1 – 0	Schalke 04	Ludwigshafen
	Baßler 5'			Stadium: Südweststadion; Attendance: 70,000

20 May 1951	SpVgg Fürth	4 – 1	FC St. Pauli	Fürth
	Appis 30'; Schade 45', 46', 82'		Haß 66'	Stadium: Sportpark Ronhof; Attendance: 23,000

27 May 1951	1. FC Kaiserslautern	2 – 0	FC St. Pauli	Ludwigshafen
	Eckel 15', 30'			Stadium: Südweststadion; Attendance: 30,000

27 May 1951	Schalke 04	2 – 1	SpVgg Fürth	Gelsenkirchen
	Matzkowski 43' (pen.); Kleina 83'		Appis 72' (pen.)	Stadium: Glückauf-Kampfbahn; Attendance: 30,000; Referee: Burmeister (Hamburg)

3 June 1951	SpVgg Fürth	1 – 3	1. FC Kaiserslautern	Fürth
	Appis 39'		Baßler 18', 63'; Eckel 20'	Stadium: Sportpark Ronhof; Attendance: 28,000; Referee: Nettekoven (Bonn)

3 June 1951	FC St. Pauli	0 – 1	Schalke 04	Hamburg
			Dargaschewski 13'	Stadium: Millerntor-Stadion; Attendance: 12,000

10 June 1951	Schalke 04	3 – 2	1. FC Kaiserslautern	Gelsenkirchen
	Malinowski 16', 75'; Eppenhoff 88'		Baßler 3'; Eckel 8'	Stadium: Glückauf-Kampfbahn; Attendance: 25,000; Referee: Skuballa (Hamburg)

10 June 1951	FC St. Pauli	1 – 0	SpVgg Fürth	Hamburg
	Beck 13'			Stadium: Millerntor-Stadion; Attendance: 4,000

=== Group 2 ===
Pos	Team	Pld	W	D	L	GF	GA	GR	Pts	Qualification	PRM	FCN	HSV	TBB
1	Preußen Münster	6	4	0	2	22	16	1.375	8	Advance to final	—	6–4	3–1	2–3
2	1. FC Nürnberg	6	4	0	2	17	13	1.308	8		1–2	—	4–1	3–1
3	Hamburger SV	6	3	0	3	12	12	1.000	6		5–1	1–2	—	3–2
4	Tennis Borussia Berlin	6	1	0	5	10	20	0.500	2		2–8	2–3	0–1	—

Source: RSSSF
Rules for classification: 1) Points; 2) Goal ratio.

6 May 1951	Hamburger SV	3 – 2	TeBe Berlin	Hamburg
	Woitkowiak 49'; Spundflasche 71'; Adamkiewicz 79'		Schmutzler 16'; Graf 84'	Stadium: Sportplatz am Rothenbaum; Attendance: 28,000; Referee: Pennig (Mannheim)

6 May 1951	1. FC Nürnberg	1 – 2	Preußen Münster	Nuremberg
	Brenzke 56' (pen.)		Lammers 18'; Preißler 40'	Stadium: Club-Stadion im Zabo; Attendance: 38,000; Referee: Burmeister (Hamburg)

13 May 1951	TeBe Berlin	2 – 3	1. FC Nürnberg	Berlin
	Berndt 41'; Wilde 60' (pen.)		Brenzke 42'; Winterstein 45'; Kallenborn 69'	Stadium: Olympiastadion; Attendance: 80,000; Referee: Skuballa (Hamburg)

13 May 1951	Preußen Münster	3 – 1	Hamburger SV	Münster
	Preißler 29'; Lammers 59'; Weghorst 87'		Rohrberg 78'	Stadium: Preußenstadion; Attendance: 32,000; Referee: Dusch (Kaiserslautern)

20 May 1951	Hamburger SV	1 – 2	1. FC Nürnberg	Hamburg
	Adamkiewicz 65'		Winterstein 9'; Herbolsheimer 32'	Stadium: Sportplatz am Rothenbaum; Attendance: 28,000; Referee: Nettekoven (Bonn)

20 May 1951	Preußen Münster	2 – 3	TeBe Berlin	Münster
	Weghorst 50'; Preißler 71'		Schulz 35' (o.g.); Schmutzler 85'; Berndt 88'	Stadium: Preußenstadion; Attendance: 38,000; Referee: Fink (Frankfurt)

27 May 1951	Hamburger SV	5 – 1	Preußen Münster	Hamburg
	Woitkowiak 39', 81'; Harden 60', 79'; Ebeling 89'		Gerritzen 48'	Stadium: Sportplatz am Rothenbaum; Attendance: 20,000; Referee: Schmetzer (Mannheim)

27 May 1951	1. FC Nürnberg	3 – 1	TeBe Berlin	Nuremberg
	Kallenborn 30'; Winterstein 55'; Brenzke 89' (pen.)		Graf 33'	Stadium: Club-Stadion im Zabo; Attendance: 32,000; Referee: Kormannshaus (Gohfeld)

3 June 1951	TeBe Berlin	0 – 1	Hamburger SV	Berlin
			Adamkiewicz 84'	Stadium: Olympiastadion; Attendance: 70,000; Referee: Reinhardt (Stuttgart)

3 June 1951	Preußen Münster	6 – 4	1. FC Nürnberg	Münster
	Preißler 14'; Rachuba 25', 63'; Gerritzen 32', 51'; Lammers 50'		Winterstein 10', 81'; Morlock 15'; Kallenborn 83'	Stadium: Preußenstadion; Attendance: 40,000; Referee: Zimmermann (Göttingen)

10 June 1951	TeBe Berlin	2 – 8	Preußen Münster	Berlin
	Schmutzler 4'; Pohnke 25' (o.g.)		Schulz 30'; Lammers 57', 77'; Preißler 72'; Rachuba 79', 88'; Warstat 81' (o.g.); Gerritzen 87'	Stadium: Olympiastadion; Attendance: 40,000; Referee: Bernbeck (Frankfurt)

10 June 1951	1. FC Nürnberg	4 – 1	Hamburger SV	Nuremberg
	Kallenborn 12', 25', 27'; Winterstein 34'		Harden 51'	Stadium: Club-Stadion im Zabo; Attendance: 40,000; Referee: Wershoven (Euskirchen)

=== Final ===
30 June 1951

1. FC Kaiserslautern	2–1	Preußen Münster
O. Walter 61', 74'		Gerritzen 47'

Olympiastadion, Berlin
Attendance: 85,000
Referee: A. Reinhardt (Stuttgart)

1. FC KAISERSLAUTERN:
GK	1	(West Germany) Karl Adam
RB	2	(West Germany) Helmut Rasch
CB	5	(West Germany) Werner Liebrich
LB	3	(West Germany) Werner Kohlmeyer
RH	4	(West Germany) Ernst Liebrich
LH	6	(West Germany) Heinz Jergens
OR	7	(West Germany) Horst Eckel
IR	8	(West Germany) Fritz Walter (c)
CF	9	(West Germany) Ottmar Walter
IL	10	(West Germany) Werner Baßler
OL	11	(West Germany) Bernhard Fuchs
Manager:
(West Germany) Richard Schneider

PREUSSEN MÜNSTER:
GK	1	(West Germany) Otto Mierzowski (c)
RB	2	(West Germany) Walter Lesch
CB	5	(West Germany) Kurt Pohnke
LB	3	(West Germany) Alois Schulte
RH	4	(West Germany) Josef Rickmann
LH	6	(West Germany) Rolf Lezgus
OR	7	(West Germany) Felix Gerritzen
IR	8	(West Germany) Alfred Preißler
CF	9	(West Germany) Rudolf Schulz
IL	10	(West Germany) Sigi Rachuba
OL	11	(West Germany) Josef Lammers
Manager:
(West Germany) Willi Multhaup
