= Karl Adam (footballer) =

German footballer

Personal information
- Full name: Karl Adam
- Date of birth: 4 February 1924
- Date of death: 9 July 1999 (aged 75)

Youth career
- 1940–1944: Koblenz

Senior career*
Years	Team	Apps	(Gls)
1944 – ~1945	Dresden sports club		
- * Club domestic league appearances and goals

Karl Adam (4 February 1924 – 9 July 1999) was a German footballer who played three times for the Germany national football team between 1951–1952.

== Life ==
Adam began his career in Koblenz at the age of 16 and by the age of 20, having made himself a career in a post office, he played in the Dresden sports club as a colleague of Helmut Schoen. After the end of the Second World War, Adam returned to Koblenz and was used as a goalkeeper for his club, turning out good performances week after week and attracting attention from 1. FC Kaiserslautern, at which point he would find himself in the midst of players such as Fritz Walter, Ottmar Walter, Werner Kohlmeyer, Werner Liebrich and Horst Eckel.

He began to play for Kaiserslautern, displacing Willi Hoelz at the first opportunity he got at the beginning of the 1950–51 season. However, he started making mistakes at the end of the season, compounded further by problems in the defence. Adam infuriated the Koblenz board and was only able to appear in one game in the season. Following a good result on the last day of the season, Adam was thrust immediately into the Germany national team. He made his debut in a 2–0 victory on 21 November 1951 against Turkey in Istanbul, and continued to make two more appearances in international victories against Luxembourg and Ireland, before new goalkeepers came to the front of competition.

Adam finished his football career in 1955 after a recurring knee injury stopped him from playing.
