= 1953 German football championship =

1953 German championship
Deutsche Fußballmeisterschaft

Tournament details
- Country: West Germany
- Dates: 3 May – 21 June
- Teams: 8

Final positions
- Champions: 1. FC Kaiserslautern; 2nd German title
- Runners-up: VfB Stuttgart

Tournament statistics
- Matches played: 25
- Goals scored: 93 (3.72 per match)
- Top goal scorer: Otto Baitinger (6 goals)

The 1953 German football championship was the culmination of the football season in the West Germany in 1952–53. 1. FC Kaiserslautern were crowned champions for the second time after a group stage and a final, having previously won the championship in 1951.

== Qualified teams ==
The teams qualified through the 1952–53 Oberliga season:

Club	Qualified from
Hamburger SV	Oberliga Nord champions
Holstein Kiel	Oberliga Nord runners-up
Borussia Dortmund	Oberliga West champions
1. FC Köln	Oberliga West runners-up
SC Union 06 Berlin	Oberliga Berlin champions
1. FC Kaiserslautern	Oberliga Südwest champions
Eintracht Frankfurt	Oberliga Süd champions
VfB Stuttgart	Oberliga Süd runners-up

== Competition ==
=== Group 1 ===
Pos	Team	Pld	W	D	L	GF	GA	GR	Pts	Qualification	FCK	SGE	KOE	KSV
1	1. FC Kaiserslautern	6	5	1	0	16	7	2.286	11	Advance to final	—	5–1	2–2	2–1
2	Eintracht Frankfurt	6	3	1	2	8	7	1.143	7		0–1	—	2–0	4–1
3	1. FC Köln	6	1	3	2	8	10	0.800	5		1–2	0–0	—	3–2
4	Holstein Kiel	6	0	1	5	8	16	0.500	1		2–4	0–1	2–2	—

Source: RSSSF
Rules for classification: 1) Points; 2) Goal ratio.

=== Group 2 ===
Pos	Team	Pld	W	D	L	GF	GA	GR	Pts	Qualification	VFB	BVB	HSV	U06
1	VfB Stuttgart	6	5	0	1	16	6	2.667	10	Advance to final	—	2–1	2–1	6–0
2	Borussia Dortmund	6	5	0	1	17	7	2.429	10		2–1	—	4–1	4–0
3	Hamburger SV	6	1	1	4	11	15	0.733	3		1–2	3–4	—	3–1
4	Union 06 Berlin	6	0	1	5	4	20	0.200	1		1–3	0–2	2–2	—

Source: RSSSF
Rules for classification: 1) Points; 2) Goal ratio.

=== Final ===
21 June 1953
15:00 CET

1. FC Kaiserslautern	4–1	VfB Stuttgart
F. Walter 37'; Wanger 57', 83'; Scheffler 78'		Kronenbitter 72'

Olympiastadion, Berlin
Attendance: 80,000
Referee: G. Ternieden (Oberhausen)

KAISERSLAUTERN:
GK	1	(West Germany) Willi Hölz
RB	2	(West Germany) Ernst Liebrich
CB	5	(West Germany) Werner Liebrich
LB	3	(West Germany) Werner Kohlmeyer
RH	4	(West Germany) Horst Eckel
LH	6	(West Germany) Otto Render
OR	7	(West Germany) Erwin Scheffler
IR	8	(West Germany) Fritz Walter (c)
CF	9	(West Germany) Ottmar Walter
IL	10	(West Germany) Willi Wenzel
OL	11	(West Germany) Karl Wanger
Manager:
(West Germany) Richard Schneider

STUTTGART:
GK	1	(West Germany) Karl Bögelein
RB	2	(West Germany) Werner Liebschwager
CB	5	(West Germany) Erich Retter
LB	3	(West Germany) Richard Steimle
RH	4	(West Germany) Robert Schlienz (c)
LH	6	(West Germany) Leo Kronenbitter
OR	7	(West Germany) Otto Baitinger
IR	8	(West Germany) Erwin Waldner
CF	9	(West Germany) Roland Wehrle
IL	10	(West Germany) Peter Krieger
OL	11	(West Germany) Rolf Blessing
Manager:
(West Germany) Georg Wurzer
