= VfR Kaiserslautern =

German association football club from Kaiserslautern, Rhineland-Palatinate, Germany

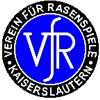
- Full name: Verein für Rasenspiele Kaiserslautern e. V.
- Founded: 1906
- Ground: Waldstadion am Erbsenberg
- Chairman: Kubilay Uluc
- Coach: Karl-Heinz Bickert and Thorsten Jehn
- League: Landesliga West
- Website: https://vfr1906kaiserslautern.de/
Home colours	Away colours

VfR Kaiserslautern (German: Verein für Rasenspiele Kaiserslautern e. V.) is a German sports club in Kaiserslautern, Rhineland-Palatinate, Germany.

== Creation ==
VfR Kaiserslautern was created through several mergers.

In 1893, MTV Kaiserslautern was formed. The football team split off and formed FC Bayern 1906 Kaiserslautern in 1906. On March 30, 1910, VfC 1906, FC Barbarossa 08 and FC Viktoria 05 merged to form Kaiserslauterer Fußball-Vereinigung 1910. Kaiserslauterer Fußball-Vereinigung 1910 then changed its name to SpVgg 1910. Then in March 1920, FC Bayern 1906 Kaiserslautern merged with SpVgg 1910 to form VfR Kaiserslautern.

== History ==
The club competed in the South German Football Association as part of the South Hess district league in the 1920s and in the Rhein district league in the 1930s. The club was supposed to play in the 1944-1945 Gauliga Südwest/Mainhessen but the season was cancelled.

The club was coached by Fritz Walter and won the 1948-1949 Westpfälzischen Amateurliga (Western Palatinate Amateur League). They were then promoted to the 1949-1950 Oberliga Südwest. The club typically finished in the lower half of the Oberliga Südwest and were eventually demoted after finishing last in the 1957–58 Oberliga Südwest. The club came in first place in the II. Division, which was the 2nd division of the Oberliga Südwest in 1958–1959, to earn promotion, but were demoted the next season. The club won the II. Division for a second time and stayed in the Oberliga Südwest until demotion in 1964/1965.

The club stayed in the 1. Amateurliga Südwest and made it to the Deutsche Fußball-Amateurmeisterschaft (German football amateur championship) in 1971, but were defeated by Sportfreunde 05 Saarbrücken in the first round. The club was then demoted from the 1. Amateurliga Südwest to the 2. Amateurliga Südwest in the 1974/1975 season. Since then, both the club's main and secondary teams have stayed in the amateur leagues. As of 2023, the club is competing the Herren Landesliga West.

== Honors ==
- Westpfälzischen Amateurliga

Champions: 1948-1949

- II. Division

Champions: 1958-1959, 1960-1961

== Notable players and staff ==
- Fritz Walter - He coached the team and played for Germany's 1954 FIFA World Cup winning squad.
- Robert Jung - He played with the team from 1963 to 1966 and later went on to play for 1. FSV Mainz 05.
- Erwin Roedler - He played for the team from 1955 to 1965 and scored six goals. He later played a large role in SV Alsenborn's three straight championship seasons.
- Fritz Ruchay - He was a coach for VfR Kaiserslautern from 1954 to 1956 and made an appearance for the Germany national football team.
- Dietmar Schwager - He played for the club from 1963 to 1964 and later spent 12 seasons with Bundesliga squad, 1. FC Kaiserslautern.
- Ernst Wilimowski - He played for the Polish and Germany national teams then made over 75 appearances for the club from 1951 to 1955.
- Werner Berndt - He began playing for the club in 1949 and set the record for most appearances for VfR Kaiserslautern with 260+ appearances. He later became the head of VfR Kaiserlautern's tennis department and held other roles in the club.
- Ernst Zägel - He played for the club from 1961 to 1962 and played for the Saarland national football team.
