= Rump =

Rump may refer to:

- Rump (animal)
  - Buttocks
- Rump steak, slightly different cuts of meat in Britain and America
- Rump kernel, software run in userspace that offers kernel functionality in NetBSD

== Politics ==
- Rump cabinet
- Rump legislature
- Rump organization
- Rump Parliament, an English parliament formed in 1648
- Rump party
- Rump Senate, during the Twelfth Texas Legislature
- Rump state

== Surname ==
- Carsten Rump (born 1981), German footballer
- Ernst Rump (born 1872–1921), German merchant, art patron and collector
- Gerhard Charles Rump (born 1947), German art historian and theorist
- Godtfred Rump (1816-1880), Danish painter
- Ragnar Rump (born 1991), Estonian football player
