= Mika Haas =

German footballer (born 2005)

Personal information
- Date of birth: 11 August 2005 (age 21)
- Place of birth: Kaiserslautern, Germany
- Height: 1.81 m (5 ft 11 in)
- Position: Defender

Team information
- Current team: 1. FC Kaiserslautern
- Number: 22

Youth career
- 2010–2012: TSG Kaiserslautern
- 2012–2015: 1. FC Kaiserslautern
- 2015–2017: TSG Kaiserslautern
- 2017–2018: SFC Kaiserslautern
- 2018: JFV Nord-West-Pfalz
- 2019–2024: 1. FC Kaiserslautern

Senior career*
Years	Team	Apps	(Gls)
2024–2025	1. FC Kaiserslautern II	8	(9)
2024–	1. FC Kaiserslautern	31	(2)

International career^{‡}
2025–	Germany U20	3	(0)
- * Club domestic league appearances and goals as of 11:03, 9 August 2026 (UTC) ‡ National team caps and goals as of 11:03, 9 August 2026 (UTC)

Mika Haas (born 11 August 2005) is a German professional footballer who plays as a defender for 2. Bundesliga side 1. FC Kaiserslautern.

== Club career ==
Born in Kaiserslautern, Haas played for a host of local youth clubs before joining the academy of 1. FC Kaiserslautern in 2019. On 24 May 2024, he signed his first professional contract with the senior side. On 14 September 2024, he made his professional debut, playing the last six minutes of a 2. Bundesliga 3–1 defeat against Hannover 96.

== International career ==
On 1 September 2025, Haas was called to the Germany U20 squad by coach Hannes Wolf for upcoming matches against Switzerland and Italy.

== Career statistics ==
As of match played 9 August 2026

Appearances and goals by club, season and competition
Club	Season	League			National cup		Other		Total	
Club	Season	Division	Apps	Goals	Apps	Goals	Apps	Goals	Apps	Goals
1. FC Kaiserslautern	2024–25	2. Bundesliga	3	0	0	0	—		3	0
1. FC Kaiserslautern	2025–26	2. Bundesliga	27	2	3	0	—		30	2
1. FC Kaiserslautern	2026–27	2. Bundesliga	1	0	0	0	—		1	0
1. FC Kaiserslautern	Total		31	2	3	0	—		34	2
Career total			31	2	3	0	0	0	34	2
