= 1. FC Kaiserslautern =

German association football club

- Full name: 1. Fußball-Club Kaiserslautern e. V.
- Nickname: Die roten Teufel (The Red Devils)
- Founded: 2 June 1900; 126 years ago
- Ground: Fritz-Walter-Stadion
- Capacity: 49,327
- Owners: Fußball-Club Kaiserslautern e.V. (45%); Saar-Pfalz-Invest GmbH (45%) U.S. consortium (10%): Chien Lee; Krishen Sud; Partners Path Capital; Pacific Media Group
- Board Member: Gero Scira (Chairman); Johannes B. Remy (Deputy Chairman)
- Head coach: Torsten Lieberknecht
- League: 2. Bundesliga
- 2025–26: 2. Bundesliga, 6th of 18
- Website: fck.de
Home colours	Away colours	Third colours

1. Fußball-Club Kaiserslautern e. V., also known as 1. FCK, FCK (German pronunciation: [ˌɛftseːˈkaː]), FC Kaiserslautern (pronounced [ˌɛftseː kaɪzɐsˈlaʊtɐn]), K'lautern or colloquially Lautern (pronounced [ˈlaʊtɐn]), is a German sports club based in Kaiserslautern, Rhineland-Palatinate. In addition to football, the club also operates in several other sports.

On 2 June 1900, Germania 1896 and FG Kaiserslautern merged to create FC 1900. In 1909, the club went on to join FC Palatia (founded in 1901) and FC Bavaria (founded in 1902) to form FV 1900 Kaiserslautern. In 1929, they merged with SV Phönix to become FV Phönix-Kaiserslautern, before finally taking on their current name in 1933.

As a founding member of the Bundesliga, FCK played from 1963 to 1996 uninterrupted in the top division. They have won four German championships, two DFB-Pokals, and one DFL-Supercup, and rank among the most successful football clubs in Germany, currently occupying eleventh place in the all-time Bundesliga table. The club's international performances include reaching the Champions League quarter-finals in 1999, as well as playing in the UEFA Cup semi-finals twice. Their first league title in the Bundesliga era was won in 1991. Kaiserslautern then won the German championship in the 1997–98 season, becoming the only team ever to win as a newly promoted team. After a six-year spell in the second tier, in 2018 they were relegated to the 3. Liga for the first time. In 2022, Kaiserslautern was promoted again to the 2. Bundesliga after winning the promotion playoff match.

Since 1920, Kaiserslautern's stadium has been the Fritz-Walter-Stadion, named in 1985 after Fritz Walter, the captain of the West Germany national team who won the World Cup in 1954. Walter spent his entire career at Kaiserslautern.

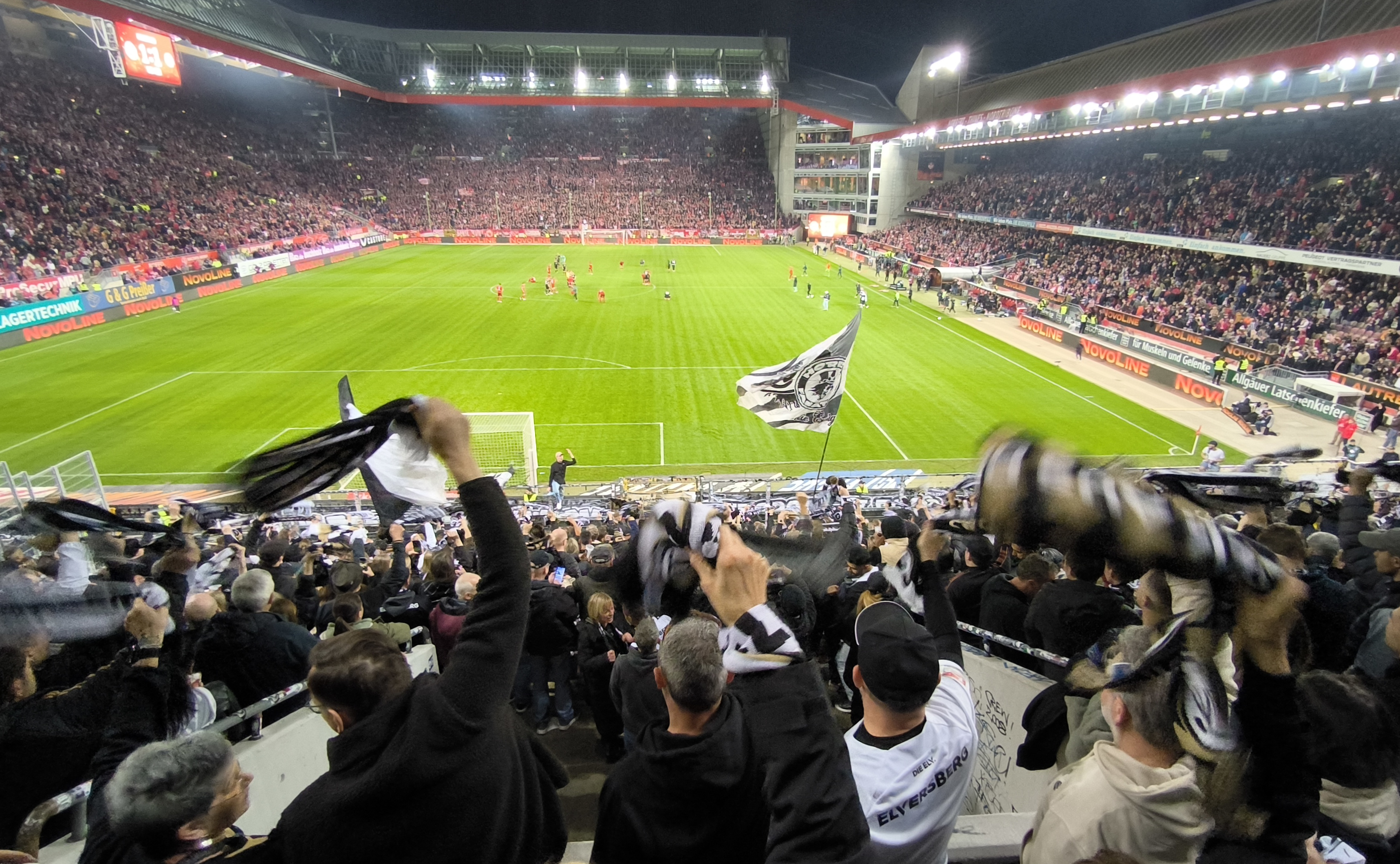
FC Kaiserslautern home stadium Fritz-Walter-Stadion.

== History ==
=== Early years through World War II ===
Two of the club's predecessors, Bavaria and FC 1900 Kaiserslautern, were part of the Westkreis-Liga (I) when this league was formed in 1908, with the latter winning the first league. The new FV Kaiserslautern finished as runners-up in the league in 1910 and 1912. The team reached tier one in the new Kreisliga Saar in 1919, the Kreisliga Pfalz in 1920 and the Bezirksliga Rhein-Saar in 1931. Throughout the 1930s, they spent time in both the Bezirksliga and the upper level Gauliga Südwest, one of sixteen top flight divisions formed in the re-organization of German football under Nazi Germany.

The club's performance improved after 1939, winning the Gauliga Südwest/Staffel Saarpfalz title, but losing the overall division title to Staffel Mainhessen winners Kickers Offenbach. In the 1941–42 season the Gauliga Südwest was split into the Gauliga Hessen-Nassau and the Gauliga Westmark, and Kaiserslautern took the Westmark title, going on to play for the first time in the national final rounds. They were knocked out 3–9 by eventual champions Schalke 04.

The team finished last in their division in 1944. The following year saw the collapse of league play due to the effects of the Second World War.

=== Postwar play ===
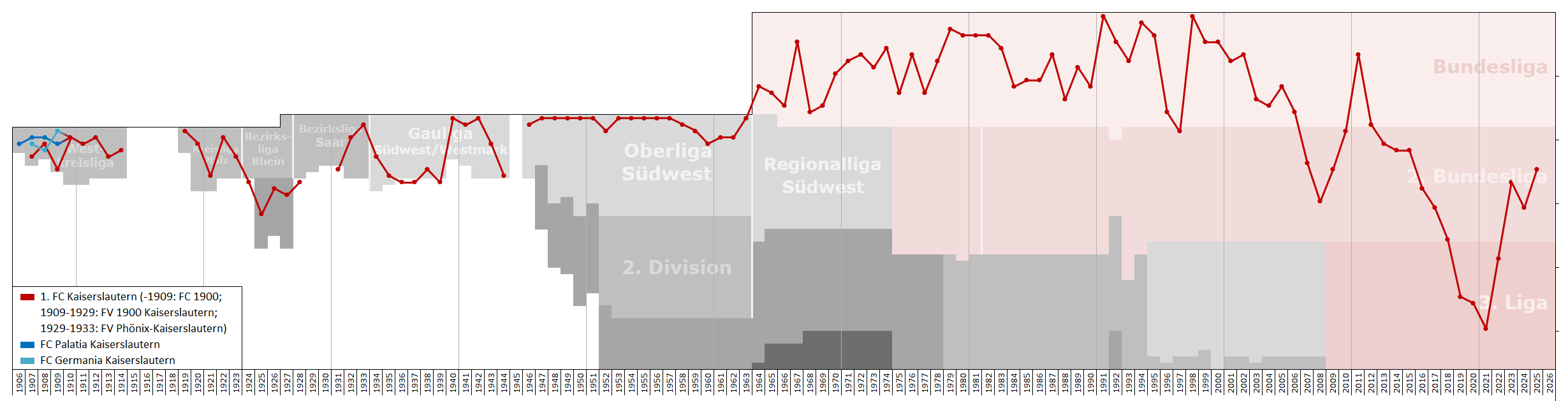
Historical chart of Kaiserslautern league performance

After the war, southwestern Germany was part of the occupation zone held by the French. Teams there were organized into northern and southern divisions, and played to determine which of them would join the new Oberliga. French authorities were slow to loosen their control over play in their zones of occupation, and, in the Saarland in particular, teams in the French areas took longer to join the re-established Germany national league than in other parts of the country. 1. FC Kaiserslautern resumed play in the Oberliga Südwest in 1945, and finished the season just one point behind 1. FC Saarbrücken. The next season, they won the Gruppe Nord in 1947. FCK's Fritz and Ottmar Walter scored 46 goals between them, more than any other entire team.

Logo 2010–2012

=== Success in the 1950s and entry to the Bundesliga ===
This marked the beginning of the club's dominance of the Oberliga Südwest as they went on to win the division title eleven times over the next twelve seasons. FCK advanced to Germany's first post-war national final in 1948, but lost 1–2 to 1. FC Nürnberg.

Kaiserslautern became a presence on the national scene through the early 1950s, winning their first German championship in 1951 with a 2–1 victory of their own, this time over Preußen Münster. They won a second title in 1953, followed by two losing final appearances in 1954 and 1955. The club also sent five players to the national side for the 1954 FIFA World Cup, which West Germany won in a final sometimes referred to as The Miracle of Bern.

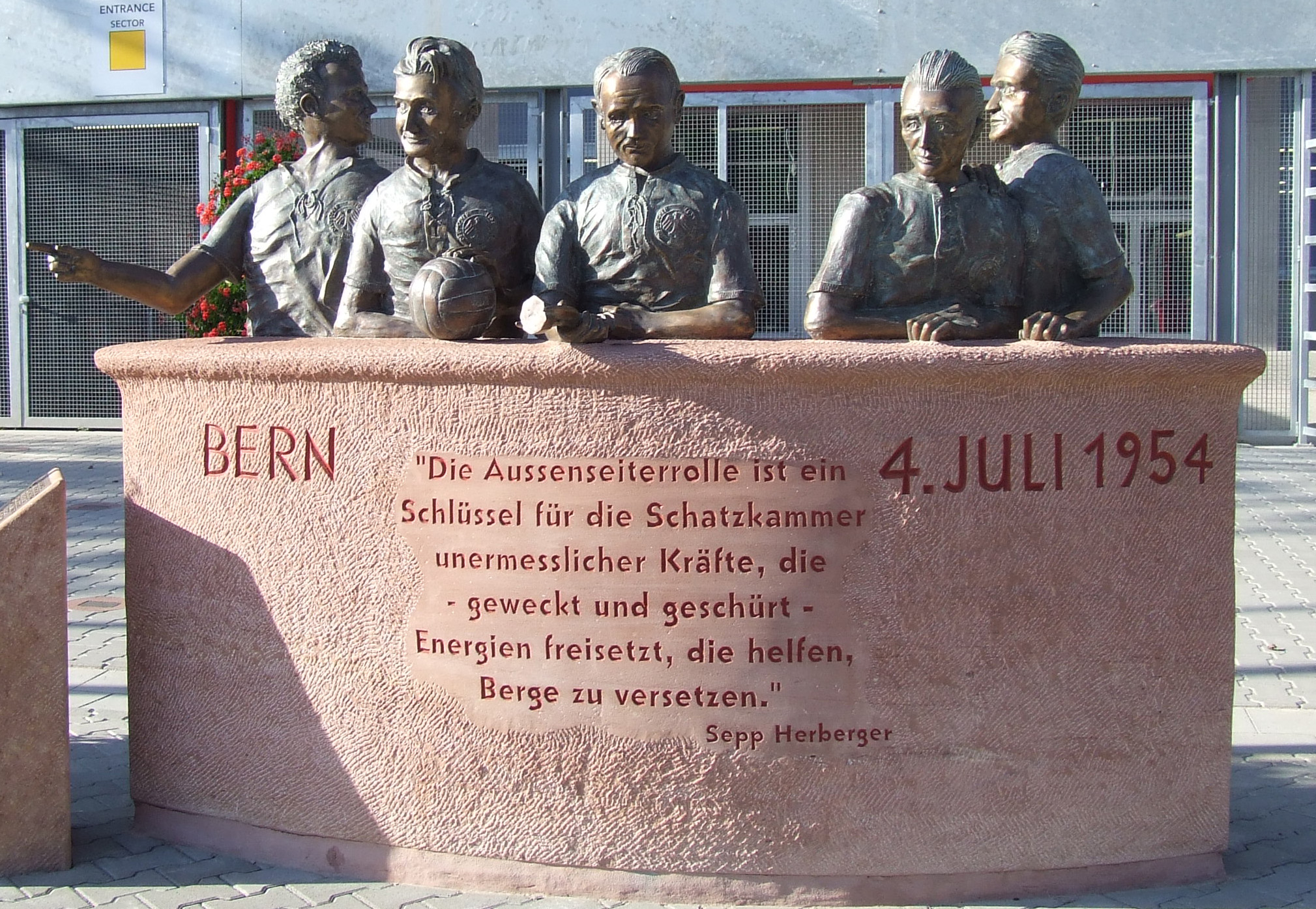
The five Kaiserslautern World Cup heroes from Bern. In bronze in front of the Fritz Walter Stadium in Kaiserslautern. From left to right: Werner Liebrich, Fritz Walter, Werner Kohlmeyer, Horst Eckel, Ottmar Walter

Kaiserslautern lost 0–2 to Werder Bremen in the 1961 DFB-Pokal final. The side recovered its form in time to again win their division on the eve of the formation in 1963 of the Bundesliga, Germany's new professional football league. This secured them one of the 16 places in the new top flight circuit. They were German Cup runners-up in 1972, 1976, and 1981, and were UEFA Cup semi-finalists in 1982 (losing narrowly to eventual winners IFK Göteborg). The club finally won the domestic Cup in 1990, and followed up this achievement the following season with their first Bundesliga championship. Both times the manager was Karl-Heinz Feldkamp.

=== 1996–2004 ===
1. FCK won a second German Cup in 1996, but were relegated to 2. Bundesliga with a 16th-place finish just one week before the Cup final. At the time, Kaiserslautern was one of only four of the original 16 teams that had played in each Bundesliga season since the inception of the league, having never been relegated. This group also included Eintracht Frankfurt (who went down in the same season), 1. FC Köln (down in 1998), and "the Dinosaur", Hamburger SV, whose spell ended in 2018.

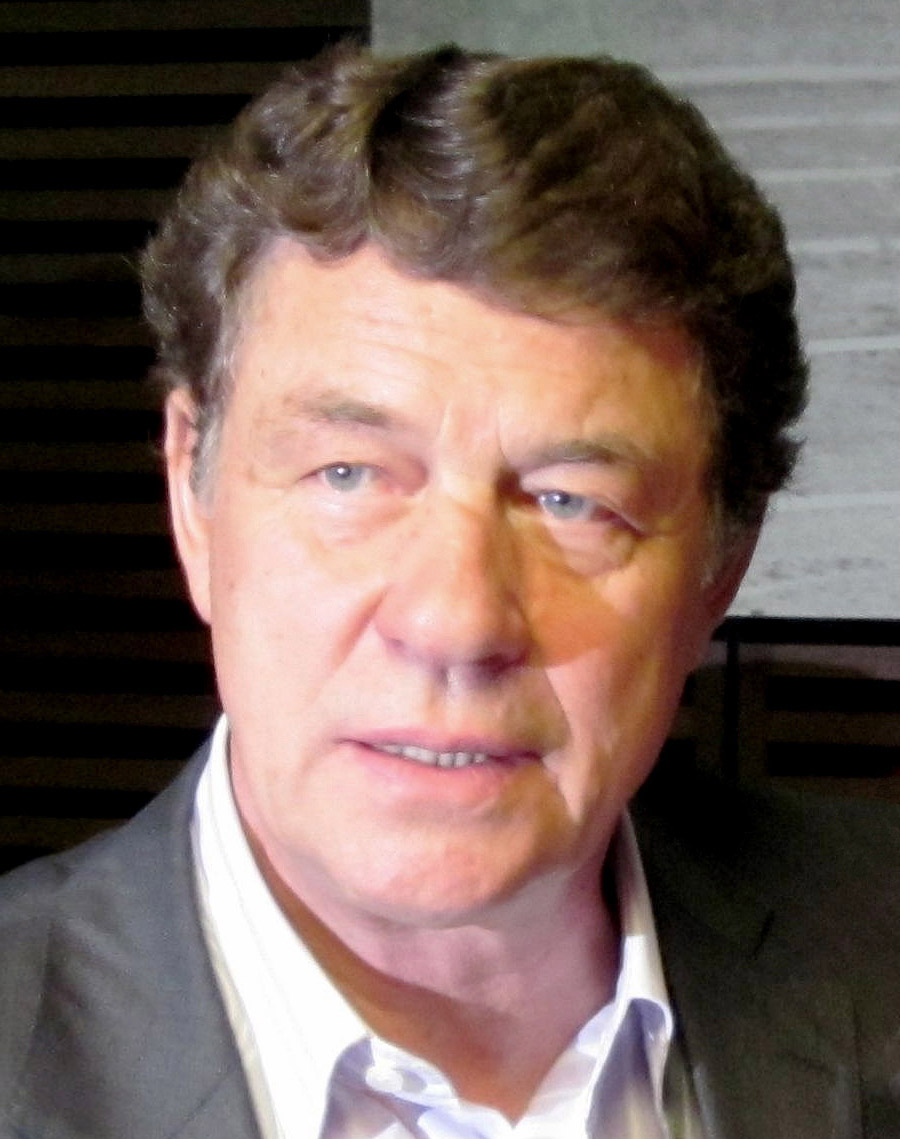
Otto Rehhagel let the newly promoted FC Kaiserslautern to win the 1997–98 Bundesliga Championship.

FCK won the 2. Bundesliga championship and earned promotion to the Bundesliga at the first attempt in 1997, They then immediately went on to win the national championship under veteran coach Otto Rehhagel — the only newly promoted team to win the Bundesliga title in German football history. They also played in the 1998–99 UEFA Champions League, where they topped a group comprising PSV, Benfica and HJK Helsinki, but were eliminated in the quarter-finals by compatriots Bayern Munich, who also took back the domestic title (FCK finished 5th).

Despite coming close to a UEFA Cup final in 2001, Kaiserslautern was close to bankruptcy, and at the centre of a public controversy. The club's management – Jürgen Friedrich, Robert Wieschemann and Gerhard Herzog – were forced out. A new team president, Rene C. Jäggi, sold the Fritz-Walter-Stadion to an entity owned by the Land Rheinland-Pfalz and the city of Kaiserslautern, while a new coach, Erik Gerets, led the team out of last place and saved them from relegation.

At the start of the 2003–04 season, the club received a three-point penalty imposed by the German Football Association for financial misconduct. Gerets was fired and replaced by Kurt Jara. Jara was unpopular with the FCK faithful for his defensive football philosophy. Jara quit the position before the season ended, citing irreconcilable differences with club management.

=== 2005–present ===
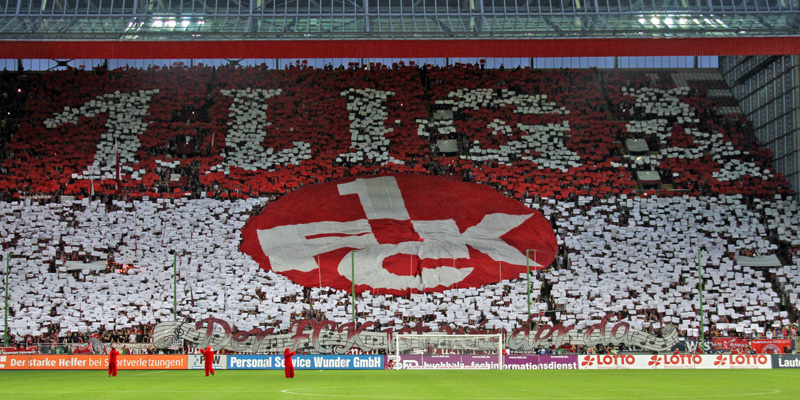
Fans celebrating the club's promotion right before the first Bundesliga home game in four years, which was held against rivals Bayern Munich.

In 2005, Michael Henke, who had served as long-time assistant to Ottmar Hitzfeld, became coach. FCK was initially successful, but later returned to bottom of the table. Henke was fired, and FCK alumnus Wolfgang Wolf took up the trainer's role. Wolf brought in many young, home-grown players, but at the end of the 2005–06 season, FCK were once again relegated to the 2. Bundesliga after a nine-year stay in the top flight. They finished the 2006–07 season in sixth place in the 2. Bundesliga, seven points out of the promotion places.

On 20 May 2007, the club announced the Norwegian manager Kjetil Rekdal, formerly with Belgian side Lierse, as their new head coach. Rekdal took over on 1 July. After only three wins in 19 games, the club was in 16th place and Rekdal was sacked and replaced by Milan Šašić in February 2008. In April 2008, the club hired Stefan Kuntz as chairman, and with new leadership they saved themselves from relegation to the new 3. Liga with a win over already promoted 1. FC Köln on the final day of the 2007–08 season.

Šašić lasted almost the entire 2008–09 season, but was dismissed on 4 May 2009 after a run of poor results in the second half of the season, and three days after a 1–5 defeat by Hansa Rostock. Alois Schwartz was named interim coach, and he managed the club to a seventh-place finish on the season. in June 2009 the club hired Marco Kurz as head coach.

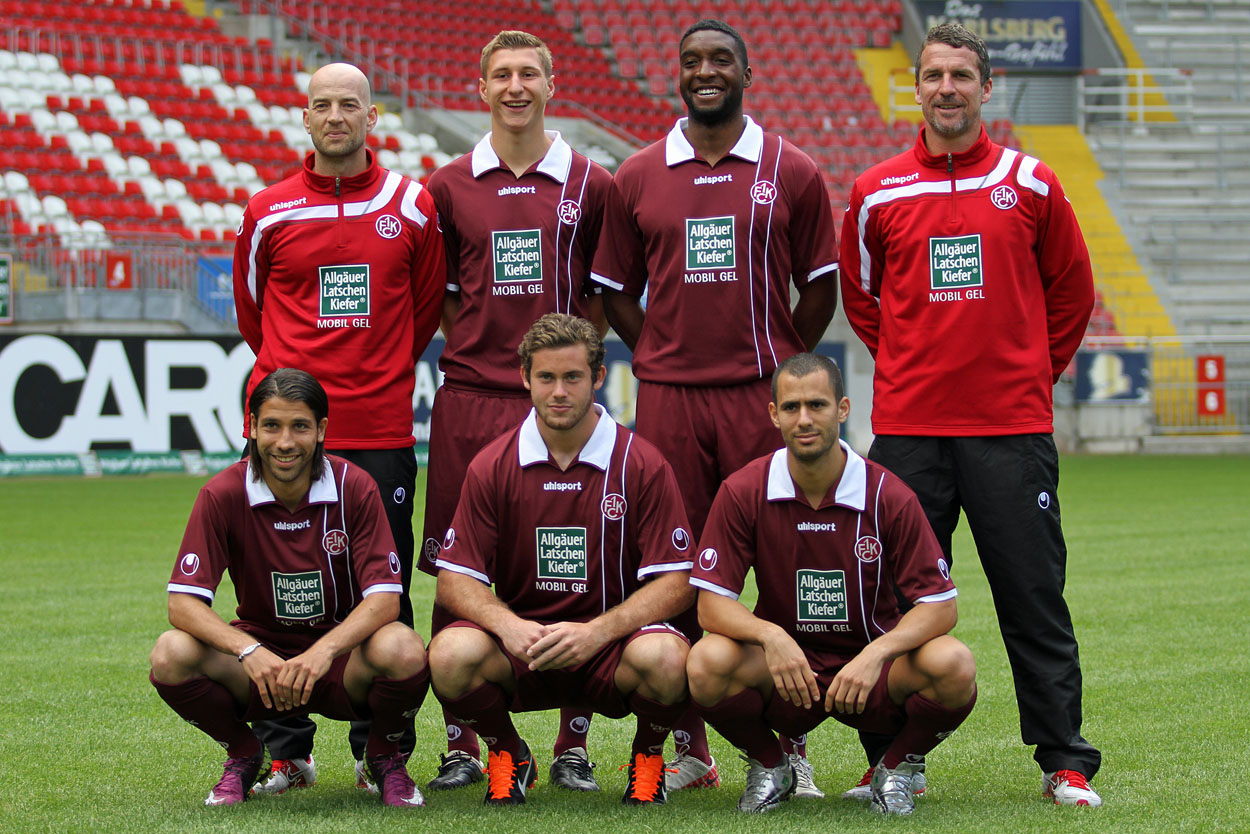
Marco Kurz led FC Kaiserslautern to win promotion to the Bundesliga in 2010.

Under Kurz, the club secured promotion to the 1. Bundesliga on 25 April 2010, after four years in the second league. At the start of the 2010–11 season, newly promoted 1. FCK had a promising two-straight wins, including a 2–0 victory over the previous year's Bundesliga champions, Bayern Munich. However, after a 2–1 defeat at Mainz 05 and a 5–0 drubbing at eventual season champions Borussia Dortmund, the club began to struggle, and fell back to just ahead of the relegation zone. The club then had a poor start to the second half of the season – dropping into the relegation zone for several weeks – but managed to rally, earning seven victories in their last ten matches. They ended this run with four straight victories to finish the season at the seventh place.

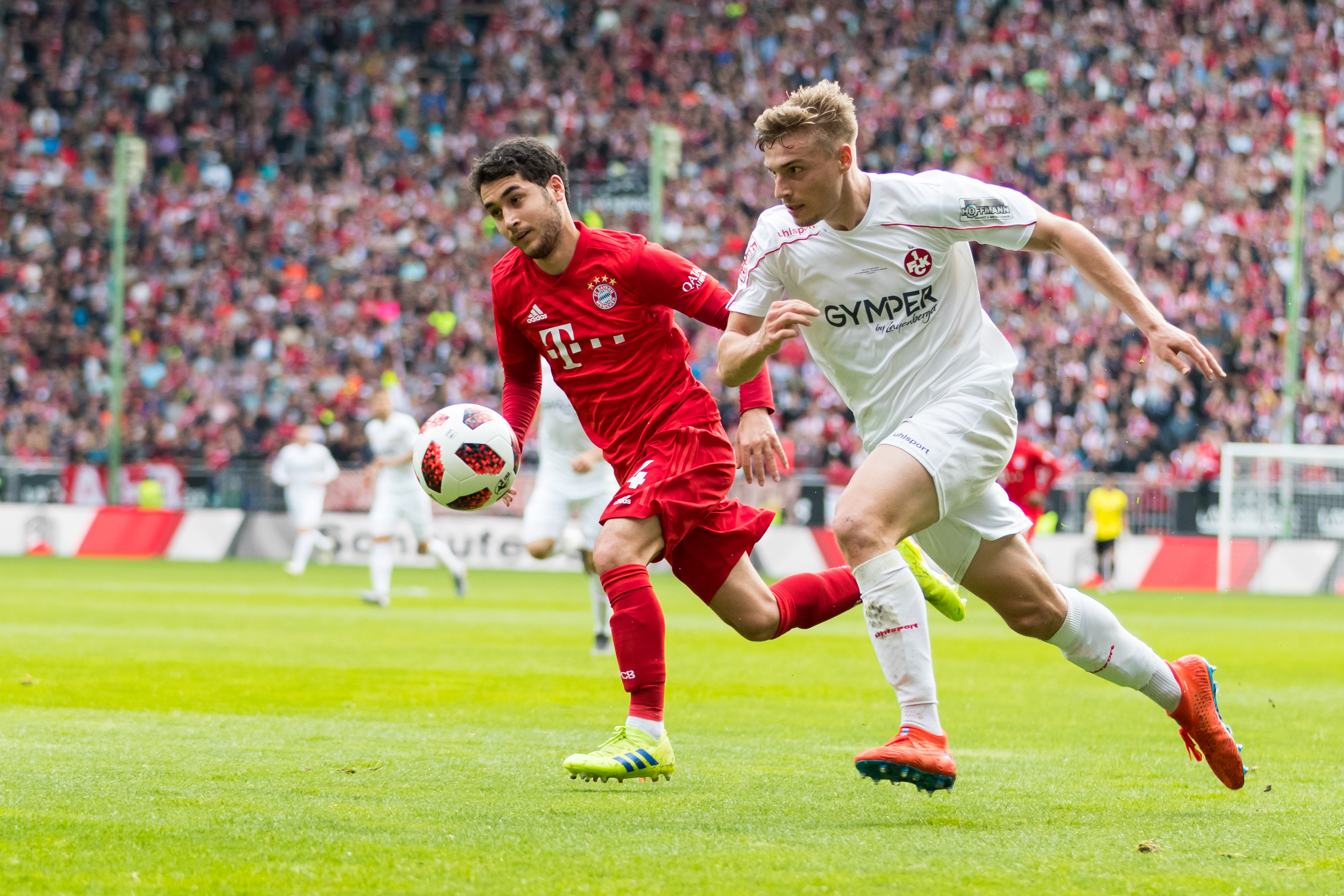
The home game between FC Kaiserslautern and rivals Bayern Munich at the Fritz-Walter-Stadion.

The following season, 2011–12, the club finished in the bottom 18th place, and after two seasons in the top flight, were relegated to the 2. Bundesliga. They remained in that division until 2018, being relegated to the third tier for the first time in club history.

In March 2022, a U.S. consortium consisting of Chien Lee of NewCity Capital, Krishen Sud, Partners Path Capital and Pacific Media Group, bought 10% of the club.

On 24 May 2022, four years after their first relegation into Germany's third division, Kaiserslautern were promoted back to the 2. Bundesliga.

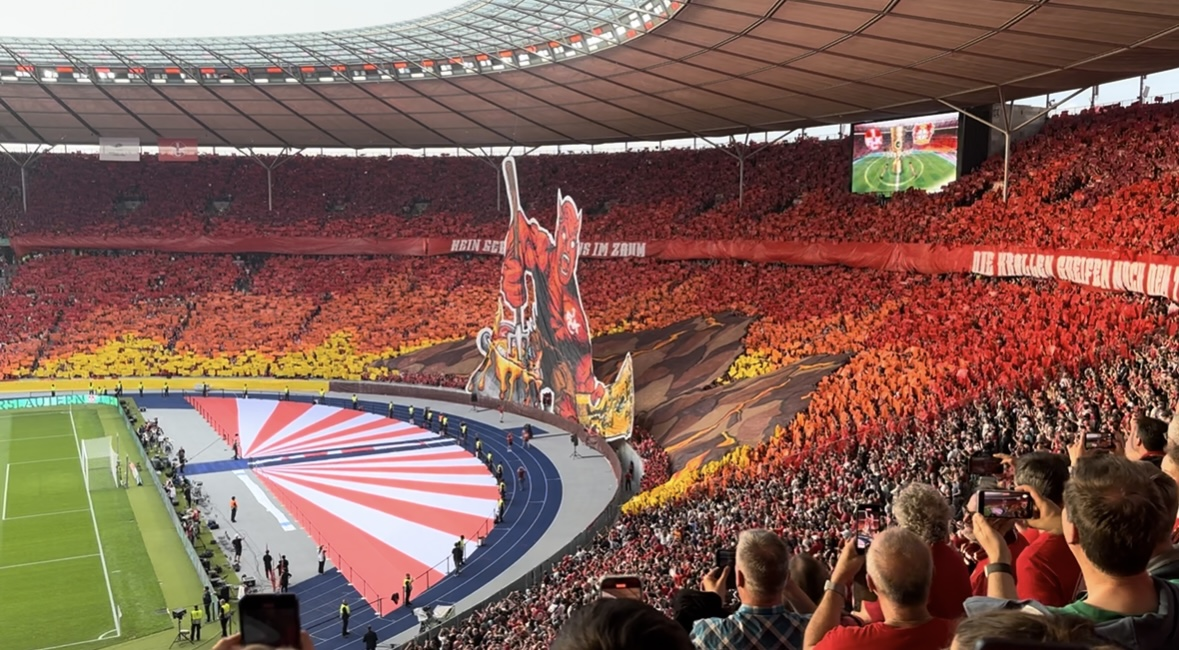
1.FC Kaiserslautern fans at the 2024 DFB-Pokal final between 1. FC Kaiserslautern and Bayer Leverkusen at the Olympic Stadium in Berlin.

In the 2023–24 season, Kaiserslauten made a DFB-Pokal run, winning against fourth division side FC Rot-Weiß Koblenz, Bundesliga side 1. FC Köln, second division side 1. FC Nürnberg and third division side 1. FC Saarbrücken to reach the DFB-Pokal final, the first in 21 years they lost 1–0 to the reigning Bundesliga champion Bayer 04 Leverkusen.

== Reserve team ==
The club's reserve team, 1. FC Kaiserslautern II, played as 1. FC Kaiserslautern Amateure until 2005. It made a first appearance in the tier three Amateurliga Südwest in 1957. It won a league championship in 1960 and 1968 but was not entitled to promotion to professional level. In 1978, when the Oberliga Südwest was introduced the team qualified for this new league which it would belong to, with the exception of the 1982–83 season, until 1992. It won promotion back to the Oberliga in 1994 and became a yo-yo team between this league and the Regionalliga above, a league newly introduced in 1994. The team was relegated from the latter in 1996, 2000, 2004 and 2007 but each time won promotion back to the league. Between 2012 and 2017, the club played in the Regionalliga Südwest.

The team has also won the Southwestern Cup on three occasions, in 1979, 1997 and 2008. Through this competition, 1. FC Kaiserslautern II qualified for the DFB-Pokal on three occasions, reaching the second round twice and being drawn against their own first team in 1997–98 where they lost 5–0.

== Kits ==
Years	Kit manufacturer	Shirt sponsor
1984–85	Adidas	Karlsberg
1985–87	Erima	Karlsberg
1987–89	Erima	Trigema
1989–91	Erima	OKI
1991–94	Uhlsport	OKI
1994–96	Adidas	OKI
1996–98	Adidas	Crunchips
1998–99	Adidas	Deutsche Vermögensberatung
1999–03	Nike	Deutsche Vermögensberatung
2003–09	Kappa	Deutsche Vermögensberatung
2009–10	Do You Football	Deutsche Vermögensberatung
2010–11	Do You Football	Allgäuer Latschenkiefer
2011–14	Uhlsport	Allgäuer Latschenkiefer
2014–15	Uhlsport	paysafecard
2015–16	Uhlsport	Maxda
2016–18	Uhlsport	Top12.de
2018–20	Uhlsport	Layenberger
2020–2024	Nike	Allgäuer Latschenkiefer
2024–	Castore	Novoline

== Recent seasons ==
As of 17 May 2026

Season	Division	Rank	P	W	D	L	GF	GA	GD	Pts	DFB-Pokal	UEFA Cup Winners' Cup	UEFA Cup/Europa League	UEFA Champions League
2021–22	3. Liga	3	36	18	9	9	56	27	+29	63	1R	—	—	—
2022–23	2. Bundesliga	9	34	11	12	11	47	48	−1	45	1R	—	—	—
2023–24	2. Bundesliga	13	34	11	6	17	59	64	−4	39	RU	—	—	—
2024–25	2. Bundesliga	7	34	15	8	11	56	55	+1	53	2R	—	—	—
2025–26	2. Bundesliga	6	34	16	4	14	52	47	+5	52	R16	—	—	—

Key

P = Played; W = Win; D = Draw; L = Loss; F = Goals for; A = Goals against; GD = Goal difference; Pts = Points; Cup = DFB-Pokal; CWC = European Cup Winners' Cup; EL = UEFA Europa League; CL = UEFA Champions League.
– = Not attended; 1R = 1st round; 2R = 2nd round; 3R = 3rd round; 1/8 = Round of sixteen; QF = Quarter-finals; SF = Semi-finals.

== Honours ==
=== League ===
- German football championship
  - Winners: 1951, 1953, 1990–91, 1997–98
  - Runners-up: 1948, 1954, 1955, 1993–94
- 2. Bundesliga
  - Winners: 1996–97, 2009–10

=== Cup ===
- DFB-Pokal
  - Winners: 1989–90, 1995–96
  - Runners-up: 1960–61, 1971–72, 1975–76, 1980–81, 2002–03, 2023–24
- DFB-Supercup
  - Winners: 1991

=== Regional ===
- Oberliga Südwest
  - Winners (11): 1946–47, 1947–48, 1948–49, 1949–50, 1950–51, 1952–53, 1953–54, 1954–55, 1955–56, 1956–57, 1962–63
  - Runners-up: 1945–46, 1957–58
- Gauliga Westmark
  - Winners: 1941–42
- Westkreis-Liga
  - Winners: 1908–09
  - Runners-up: 1909–10, 1911–12
- Southwestern Cup
  - Winners: 2018–19, 2019–20

=== Youth ===
- German under-19 championship
  - Winners: 1991–92
  - Runners-up: 1983–84, 1990–91, 1992–93, 2010–11
- German under-17 championship
  - Winners: 1982–83
  - Runners-up: 1991–92

== Stadium ==
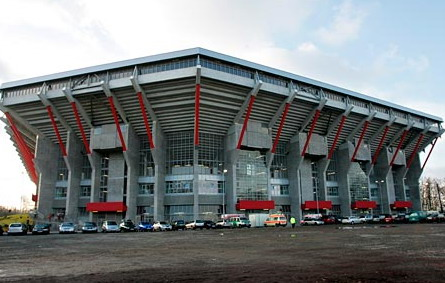
Fritz-Walter-Stadion

FCK plays its home fixtures in the Fritz-Walter-Stadion first built in 1920. In 1985 the stadium and the adjacent street were named for the player who brought the club to prominence after World War II. The facility is built on the Betzenberg, literally "Mount Betze", a steep sandstone hill.

The stadium has a capacity of 49,327 and was a venue at the 2006 World Cup, hosting four preliminary round and one group of 16-round matches. The facility underwent a major refurbishment for the tournament with addition of new grandstands and a roof.

== Club culture ==
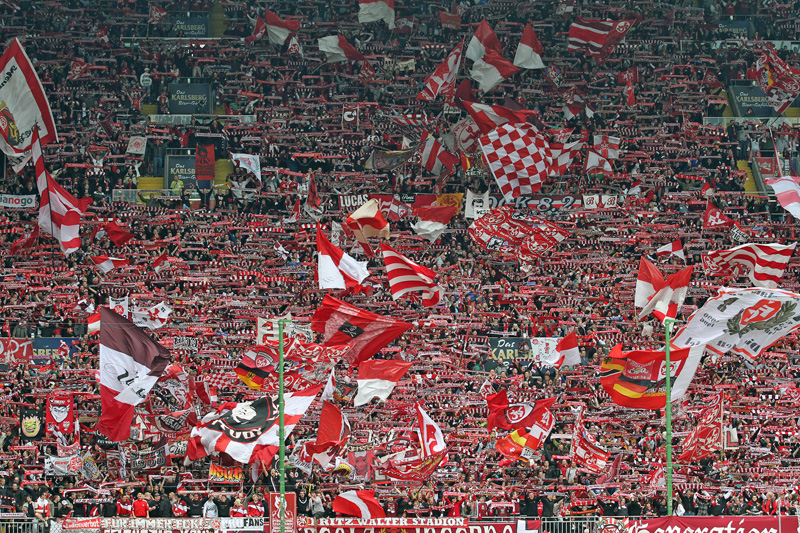
The "Westkurve" in April 2011

Kaiserslautern's Fritz-Walter-Stadion has long been a feared away venue given the intense passion of Kaiserslautern fans: most of these supporters are located in the stadium's "Westkurve" (Westside, literally "West Curve", since the stands used to be shaped in a semicircle behind the goals). Bayern Munich once lost a match here in 1973 by a score of 7–4 after leading 4–1 at the 58th minute.

The club has friendly ties to FC Metz, 1860 Munich, VfB Stuttgart, Werder Bremen and Kilmarnock F.C. of Scotland and are strong rivals of Waldhof Mannheim and Bayern Munich. They also have local rivalries with Eintracht Frankfurt and with Mainz 05 and Karlsruher SC.

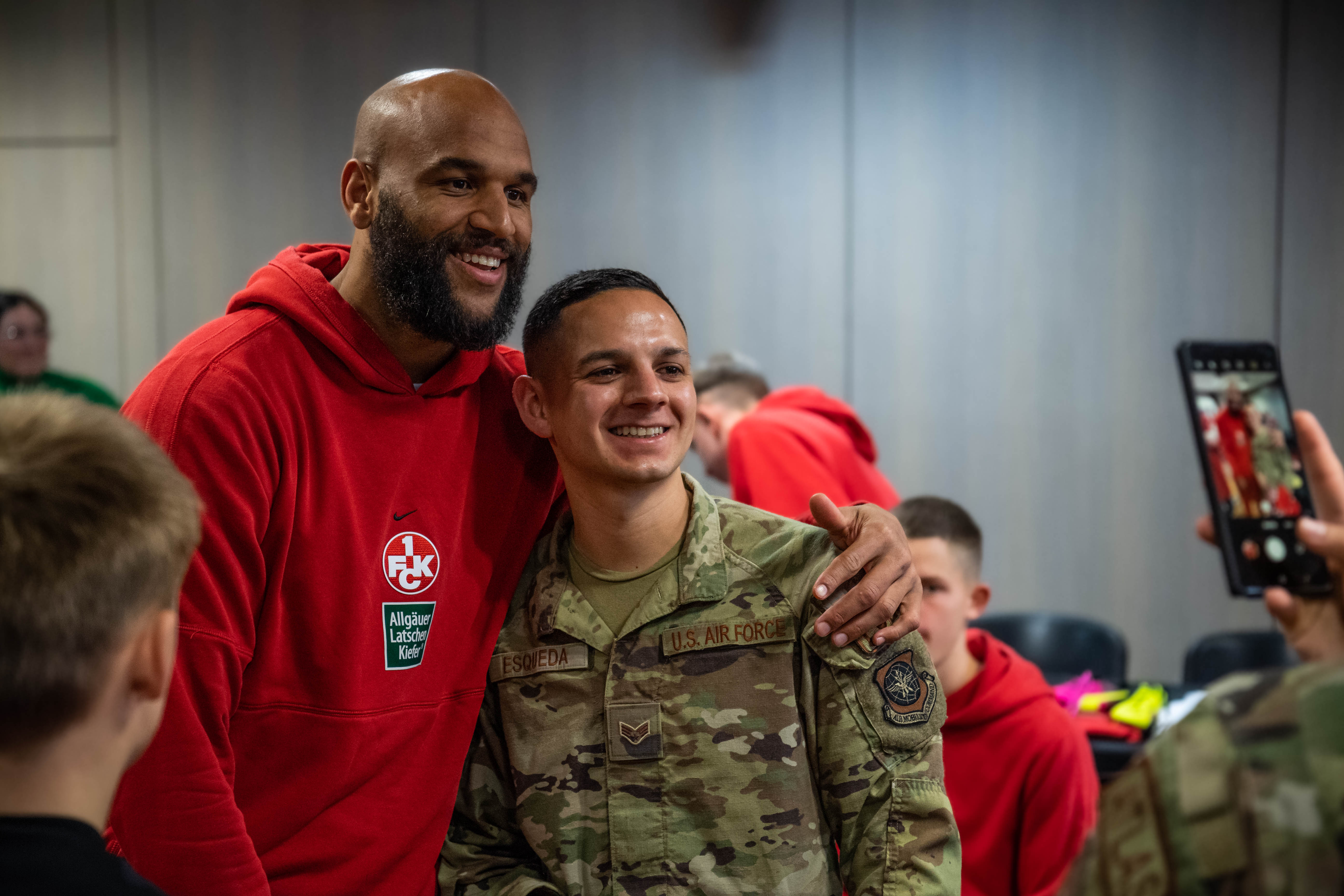
Terrence Boyd takes photos with Airmen at Ramstein Air Base, Germany, in March 2023

FC Kaiserslautern has a strong connection with the United States, especially through the American Ramstein Air Base near the city of Kaiserslautern, the largest U.S. military community outside the United States, which has helped create a large fan base of American service members and their families. American player and former U.S. Men’s National Team forward Terrence Boyd has also been a forward for the FC Kaiserslautern team, and a U.S. consortium purchased a stake in the club in 2022.

== Players ==
=== Current squad ===
As of 3 September 2026

Note: Flags indicate national team as defined under FIFA eligibility rules; some limited exceptions apply. Players may hold more than one non-FIFA nationality.

No.	Pos.	Nation	Player
1	GK	GER	Julian Krahl
2	DF	GER	Simon Asta
3	DF	IRL	Alex Murphy (on loan from Newcastle United)
4	DF	GER	Maxwell Gyamfi
5	DF	GER	Kelven Frees (on loan from TSG Hoffenheim)
6	MF	GER	Fabian Kunze
7	MF	GER	Marlon Ritter (captain)
8	MF	GER	Semih Şahin
9	FW	CRO	Ivan Prtajin
11	FW	MLI	Ibrahim Kanaté (on loan from Anderlecht)
14	DF	DEN	Jacob Rasmussen
15	MF	FIN	Naatan Skyttä
17	FW	TUR	Erencan Yardımcı (on loan from TSG Hoffenheim)
20	FW	GER	Mërgim Berisha
21	MF	SVK	Mário Sauer (on loan from Toulouse)

No.	Pos.	Nation	Player
22	DF	GER	Mika Haas
26	DF	FRA	Paul Joly
33	DF	SUI	Jan Elvedi
34	GK	GER	Yannick Onohiol
37	MF	GER	Leon Robinson
39	FW	AUT	Thierry Tazemeta
40	GK	GER	Enis Kamga
41	MF	GER	David Schramm
42	MF	GER	Erik Müller
43	MF	GER	Owen Gibs
44	MF	GER	Dion Hofmeister
45	FW	SRB	Miloš Luković (on loan from Strasbourg)
46	FW	GER	Kian Scheer
47	MF	GER	Ben Jungfleisch

=== Out on loan ===
Note: Flags indicate national team as defined under FIFA eligibility rules; some limited exceptions apply. Players may hold more than one non-FIFA nationality.

No.	Pos.	Nation	Player
—	FW	AZE	Mahir Emreli (at Raków Częstochowa until 30 June 2027)

=== Former players ===
- (Germany) Ernest Wilimowski
- (Germany) Werner Baßler
- (Germany) Willi Wenzel
- (Germany) Erwin Scheffler
- (Germany) Werner Kohlmeyer
- (Germany) Fritz Walter
- (Germany) Ottmar Walter
- (Germany) Werner Liebrich
- (Germany) Horst Eckel
- (Germany) Willi Hölz
- (Germany) Karl Schmidt
- (Germany) Dietmar Schwager
- (Germany) Ernst Diehl
- (Germany) Reiner Geye
- (Germany) Josef Pirrung
- (Germany) Klaus Toppmöller
- (Germany) Hannes Bongartz
- (Germany) Michael Dusek
- (Germany) Werner Melzer
- (Germany) Hans-Peter Briegel
- (Germany) Jürgen Groh
- (Germany) Friedhelm Funkel
- (Germany) Gerry Ehrmann
- (Germany) Thomas Allofs
- (Germany) Andreas Brehme
- (Germany) Mario Basler
- (Germany) Carsten Jancker
- (Germany) Olaf Marschall
- (Germany) Stefan Kuntz
- (Germany) Andreas Reinke
- (Germany) Axel Roos
- (Germany) Marco Haber
- (Germany) Wolfram Wuttke
- (Germany) Ingo Hertzsch
- (Germany) Michael Ballack
- (Germany) Tim Wiese
- (Germany) Miroslav Klose
- (Sweden) Roland Sandberg
- (Sweden) Ronnie Hellström
- (Sweden) Torbjörn Nilsson
- (Czech Republic) Miroslav Kadlec
- (Czech Republic) Pavel Kuka
- (Czech Republic) Vratislav Lokvenc
- (Denmark) Michael Schjønberg
- (Denmark) Bjarne Goldbæk
- (Switzerland) Ciriaco Sforza
- (France) Youri Djorkaeff
- (Brazil) Lincoln
- (Egypt) Hany Ramzy
- (Bosnia and Herzegovina) Demir Hotić
- (United States) Thomas Dooley
- (Hungary) Tamás Hajnal
- (Turkey) Halil Altıntop
- (Bulgaria) Marian Hristov
- (Greece) Kostas Fortounis
- (Luxembourg) Jeff Strasser
- (Iran) Ferydoon Zandi

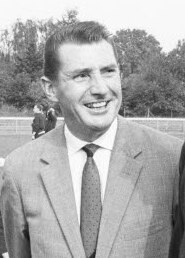
Fritz Walter

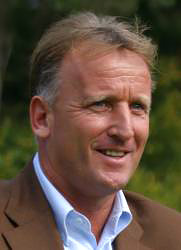
Andreas Brehme

== Coaching staff ==
Position	Staff
Managing director	(Germany) Thomas Hengen
Sporting director	(Germany) Marcel Klos
Head coach	(Germany) Torsten Lieberknecht
Assistant coach	(Germany) Carsten Rump (Germany) Niklas Martin
Head of athletics and performance	(Germany) Jimmy Lohberg
Rehabilitation and athletic coach	(Germany) Fabian Kobel
Head of goalkeeper area	(Germany) Sören Rittmeier
Video analyst	(Germany) Max Lieberknecht
Team doctor	(Germany) Dr. Nils Veith (Germany) Dr. Claudia Thaler
Physiotherapist	(Germany) Christian Frank (Germany) Dominik Rudy (Germany) Johannes Wekesser
Equipment manager	(Germany) Bernd Fiedler
Washerwoman	(Germany) Birgit Jungmann
Team management	(Germany) Daniel Lewandowski

== Other sports ==
1. FC Kaiserslautern also has sports departments in athletics, basketball, boxing, handball, headis, hockey, running, and triathlon.

=== Basketball ===
The basketball department was founded in 1952. The seniors team played in the second German Basketball league from 2002 until 2007. In the 2014–15 season, both the male and female senior teams play in the fourth division.

=== Boxing ===
The boxing department exists since the times of FV Kaiserslautern. Most prominent athletes are Silver medalist of the 1964 Summer Olympics Emil Schulz, Bronze medalist of the 1988 Summer Olympics Reiner Gies and, before his professional career, later European heavyweight champion Karl Mildenberger.

=== Former departments ===
==== Wheelchair basketball ====
The wheelchair basketball team FCK Rolling Devils was founded in 2009 as a part of the club's basketball department and turned into a separate department in 2013. Since 2014, the Rolling Devils play in the 1st German Wheelchair Basketball Federal League. In July 2015, the outsourcing of Rolling Devils into an independent club with 1.FC Kaiserslautern as name sponsor took place and the FCK department was suspended at the annual meeting of 1.FC Kaiserslautern in December 2015.
