= Robert Jung =

German footballer

Personal information
- Date of birth: 19 December 1944
- Place of birth: Kaiserslautern, Germany
- Position: Defender

Senior career*
Years	Team	Apps	(Gls)
1963–1966	VfR Kaiserslautern		
1966–1976	FK Pirmasens		
1976–1978	FK Clausen		
1978–1979	FK Pirmasens		

Managerial career
- 1978–1985: FK Pirmasens
- 1985–1987: FSV Salmrohr
- 1987: Kickers Offenbach
- 1987–1988: SC Birkenfeld
- 1989–1992: Mainz 05
- 1992–1993: Rot-Weiss Frankfurt
- 1993–1994: SV Wehen
- 1996–1998: FK Pirmasens
- 1998–2001: Wormatia Worms
- 2001–2005: SC Hauenstein
- 2005–2006: FK Pirmasens
- 2009–2012: FSV Salmrohr
- 2012–2013: SV Mehring
- 2013: SVN Zweibrücken
- 2014: FC Homburg
- * Club domestic league appearances and goals

Robert Jung (born 19 December 1944) is a German former football player and manager who played as a defender.
