= Dion Hofmeister =

German footballer (born 2009)

Personal information
- Date of birth: 11 July 2009 (age 17)
- Place of birth: Neustadt an der Weinstraße, Germany
- Height: 1.87 m (6 ft 2 in)
- Position: Midfielder

Team information
- Current team: 1. FC Kaiserslautern
- Number: 44

Youth career
- 1. FC 08 Haßloch
- 2018–2025: 1. FC Kaiserslautern

Senior career*
| Years | Team | Apps | (Gls) |
| 2025– | 1. FC Kaiserslautern II | 10 | (3) |
| 2025– | 1. FC Kaiserslautern | 3 | (0) |

International career^{‡}
| 2024 | Germany U16 | 2 | (0) |
| 2026– | Germany U17 | 6 | (1) |
- * Club domestic league appearances and goals as of 24 September 2026 ‡ National team caps and goals as of 27 July 2026

Dion Hofmeister (born 11 July 2009) is a German professional footballer who plays as a midfielder for 2. Bundesliga club 1. FC Kaiserslautern.

== Club career ==
Born in Neustadt an der Weinstraße, Hofmeister is a youth product of FC 08 Haßloch and 1. FC Kaiserslautern.

Hofmeister made his professional debut with Kaiserslautern during a 4–1 win over Holstein Kiel in the 2. Bundesliga on 23 November 2025. He then became the youngest player to ever play for Kaiserslautern and the second youngest player in the German second tier history, just behind Kennet Eichhorn.

In December 2025, he signed his first professional contract with Kaiserslautern.

== International career ==
Born in Germany, Hofmeister also has French origins. He is a youth international for Germany, having played for the under-16 and under-17, scoring for his debut with the latter in February 2026.
