= Leon Robinson (footballer) =

German footballer (born 2001)

Personal information
- Full name: Leon Reid Robinson
- Date of birth: 11 July 2001 (age 25)
- Place of birth: Worms, Germany
- Height: 1.86 m (6 ft 1 in)
- Positions: Defensive midfielder; centre-back

Team information
- Current team: 1. FC Kaiserslautern
- Number: 37

Youth career
- –2008: TSV Gau-Odernheim
- 2008–2017: Mainz 05
- 2018–2020: TSV Schott Mainz

Senior career*
Years	Team	Apps	(Gls)
2020–2021	FC Wörrstadt		
2021–2023	TSV Gau-Odernheim	45	(8)
2023–2024	1. FC Kaiserslautern II	43	(1)
2024–	1. FC Kaiserslautern	47	(0)
- * Club domestic league appearances and goals as of 18 May 2026

Leon Reid Robinson (born 11 July 2001) is a German professional footballer who plays as a defensive midfielder or centre-back for 2. Bundesliga club 1. FC Kaiserslautern.

== Career ==
=== Early career (2008–2023) ===
Robinson was born in Worms, and began his youth development at TSV Gau-Odernheim, before joining the academy of Mainz 05 in 2008. He remained in the Mainz system for nine years before moving to TSV Schott Mainz in 2018. During his time at Schott Mainz, he made his first appearances in senior football for the club's second team in the Bezirksliga.

In 2020, Robinson stepped away from full-time football to complete professional training as a police officer with the German Federal Police (Bundespolizei) in Bamberg. During this period, he played for FC Wörrstadt and later returned to his youth club, TSV Gau-Odernheim, in the sixth-tier Verbandsliga Südwest.

=== 1. FC Kaiserslautern (2023–present) ===
In the summer of 2023, Robinson signed with the reserve team of 1. FC Kaiserslautern. He quickly became a pivotal figure for the U21 squad in the Oberliga Rheinland-Pfalz/Saar, where he was named team captain. His consistent performances as a defensive leader earned him an invitation to train with the senior squad under head coach Markus Anfang during the 2023–24 season.

On 1 June 2024, the club announced that Robinson had signed his first professional contract. He made his professional debut on 4 August 2024, coming on as a substitute in a 2. Bundesliga match against SSV Ulm. Known for his strong tackling and tactical discipline, Robinson established himself as a regular in the first team squad throughout the 2024–25 and 2025–26 seasons, often used as a defensive anchor or a central defender.

== Personal life ==
Robinson is a dual citizen of Germany and the United States, born to an American father and a German mother. Alongside his football career, he is a fully qualified police officer (Polizeikommissar). His background in the police force led to the nickname "Leon, der Profi" among the Kaiserslautern supporters.

== Career statistics ==
As of match played 15 March 2026

Appearances and goals by club, season and competition
Club	Season	League			National cup (Note: Includes DFB-Pokal and South West Cup)		Total	
Club	Season	Division	Apps	Goals	Apps	Goals	Apps	Goals
TSV Gau-Odernheim	2021–22	Verbandsliga Südwest	17	3	2	0	19	3
TSV Gau-Odernheim	2022–23	Verbandsliga Südwest	28	5	3	1	31	6
TSV Gau-Odernheim	Total		45	8	5	1	50	9
1. FC Kaiserslautern II	2023–24	Oberliga Rheinland-Pfalz/Saar	43	1	0	0	43	1
1. FC Kaiserslautern	2024–25	2. Bundesliga	24	0	2	0	26	0
1. FC Kaiserslautern	2025–26	2. Bundesliga	17	0	3	0	20	0
1. FC Kaiserslautern	Total		41	0	5	0	46	0
Career total			129	9	10	1	139	10
