= Fritz Walter =

German footballer (1920–2002)

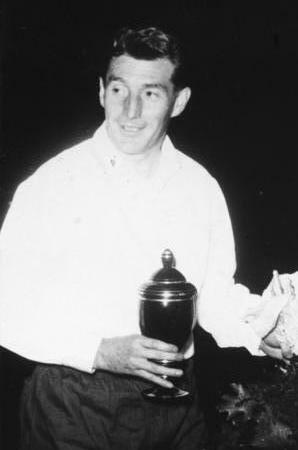
- Walter with Kaiserslautern in 1956

Personal information
- Full name: Friedrich Walter
- Date of birth: 31 October 1920
- Place of birth: Kaiserslautern, Germany
- Date of death: 17 June 2002 (aged 81)
- Place of death: Enkenbach-Alsenborn, Germany
- Height: 1.75 m (5 ft 9 in)
- Positions: Attacking midfielder; inside forward

Youth career
- 1928–1937: 1. FC Kaiserslautern (Note: Even the 1928–1929 period as FV Kaiserslautern is included.)

Senior career*
Years	Team	Apps	(Gls)
1937–1959	1. FC Kaiserslautern	411	(372)
1943	TSG Diedenhofen	29	(18)
1943	TSG Saargemünd	12	(1)
Total		469	(391)

International career
1940–1958	Germany / West Germany	61	(33)

Managerial career
- 1945–1949: 1. FC Kaiserslautern (player-coach)
- 1960: VfL Neustadt/Coburg
- 1962–1968: SV Alsenborn
Medal record
Men's football
Representing West Germany
FIFA World Cup
Winner	1954 Switzerland
- * Club domestic league appearances and goals

Friedrich "Fritz" Walter (German: [ˈfʁiːdʁɪç fʁɪts ˈvaltɐ]; 31 October 1920 – 17 June 2002) was a German footballer who spent his entire senior career at 1. FC Kaiserslautern. He usually played as an attacking midfielder or inside forward. In his time with the Germany and West Germany national teams, he appeared in 61 games and scored 33 goals, and was the captain of the team that won the 1954 FIFA World Cup. After his career, he was named honorary captain of the Germany national team. Walter held the record for the most assists provided in FIFA World Cup tournaments, recording either nine or ten assists. His record was eventually surpassed by Lionel Messi in 2026.

== Life and career ==
=== Early club career ===
Born on 31 October 1920, Walter was exposed to football early with his parents, Ludwig (1894–1976) and Dorothea Walter (née Kieburg; 1896–1978), working at the 1. FC Kaiserslautern club restaurant. By 1928 he had joined the Kaiserslautern youth academy, and he made his first team debut at 17, continuing an association with the club that would be his only professional club.

International pro teams had repeatedly offered him hefty sums, but with support from his wife always declined in order to stay at home, to play for his home town, the national team and "Chef" (German for "Boss") Herberger.

=== International debut ===
Walter debuted with the Germany national team in 1940 under Sepp Herberger, and scored a hat-trick against Romania.

=== War ===
Walter was drafted into the armed forces in 1942. However, the end of the war found 24-year-old Walter in a Prisoner of War camp in Maramures in which he played with Hungarian and Slovak guards. When the Soviets arrived they generally took all German prisoners back to Gulags in the Soviet Union. One of the Hungarian prison guards had seen Walter playing for Germany, and told them that Fritz was not German but from the Saar Protectorate. Walter would later call the match in question as the most important of his life as it spared him and his brother from a gulag sentence.

=== Return to Germany ===
Upon his return in 1945, Walter, who by now suffered from malaria, again played for Kaiserslautern, leading them to German championships in 1951 and 1953. Walter coached VfR Kaiserslautern during the 1948–49 season and helped them win the 1948–49 Westpfälzischen Amateurliga. Sepp Herberger recalled Walter to the national team in 1951, and he was named captain.

He was captain of the West German team that won their first World Cup in 1954, beating Hungary. He and his brother, Ottmar Walter, became the first brothers to play in a World Cup winning team.

In 1956, after the crackdown by the Soviets of the Hungarian Uprising, the Hungarian football team were caught away from home, and for two years, Fritz managed their games and provided the financial backing and in small measure, paid them back for having saved him from deportation to the Soviet Union. Walter received his last cap during the semi-final against Sweden in the 1958 World Cup, suffering an injury which ended his international career, and he retired from football in 1959.

=== Later life and legacy ===
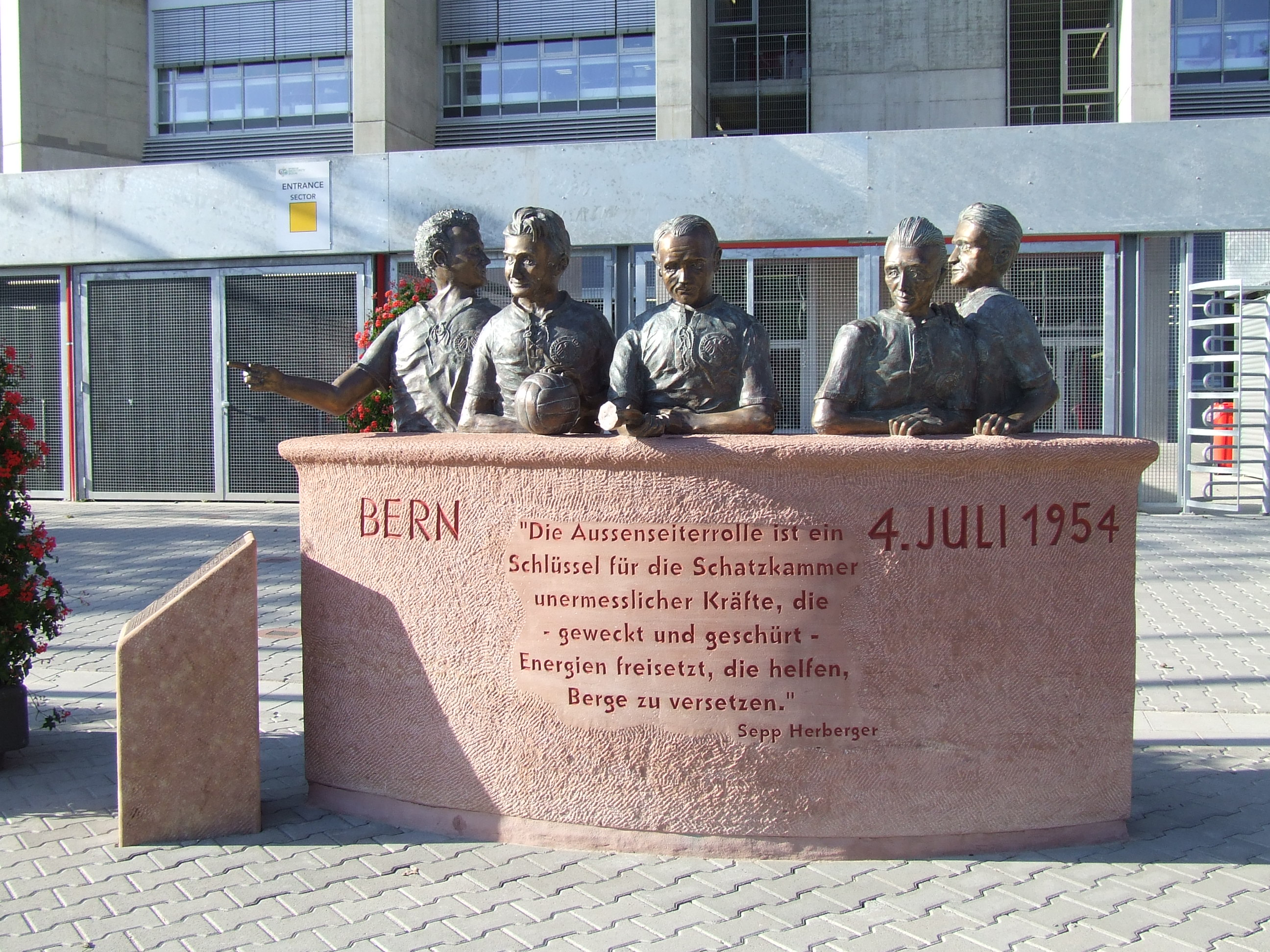
Memorial for the 1. FC Kaiserslautern players in the 1954 FIFA World Cup Final. From left to right: Werner Liebrich, Walter, Werner Kohlmeyer, Horst Eckel and Ottmar Walter.

The home stadium of 1. FC Kaiserslautern was renamed the Fritz-Walter-Stadion in 1985.

Fritz Walter was named an honorary captain of the German football squad in 1958. The other five are Uwe Seeler, Franz Beckenbauer, Lothar Matthäus, Bettina Wiegmann and Jürgen Klinsmann.

Walter died in Enkenbach-Alsenborn on 17 June 2002, aged 81. It was his dream to see the World Cup 2006 in "his" town Kaiserslautern as the town had not been selected in the smaller tournament of 1974, but it was denied with his death. But on the fourth anniversary of his death on 17 June 2006, the United States played Italy in Kaiserslautern and a minute of silence was observed in his memory. Today people may visit the "Fritz Walter Haus" in the town of Enkenbach-Alsenborn approx. 20 km east of Kaiserslautern (first exit from Kaiserslautern on Bundesautobahn 6 direction Mannheim).

In November 2003, to celebrate UEFA's 50th anniversary, the German Football Association (DFB) selected him as its Golden Player of the past 50 years (from 1954 to 2003).

During the eighties and nineties, there was another successful Bundesliga striker called "Fritz Walter", who mainly played for VfB Stuttgart. Although he had no relationship to the great Kaiserslautern captain, sports fans jokingly called him "Fritz Walter junior".

In 2005, the Fritz Walter Medal, a series of annual awards which were established in his honour, and which are given by the German Football Association to youth footballers in Germany, was first awarded.

== Personal life ==
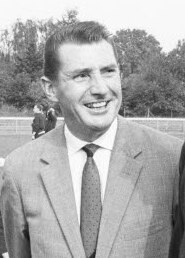
Walter in 1965

Walter's wife of five decades was Italia Walter (née Bortoluzzi; 1921–2001), a woman from Belluno, Italy.

It was popular knowledge in Germany that Walter played better the worse the weather was, which led to the term "Fritz-Walter-Wetter" (Fritz Walter weather) to describe rainy weather conditions. He had contracted malaria during the war, making it hard for him to play in hot weather; soggy, heavy ground also gave him an advantage due to his superior technique. The 1954 World Cup final was played in such conditions.

On 6 October 1956, Walter scored a spectacular goal in Leipzig in front of 100,000 East Germans during a friendly against Wismut Aue, when he hit the ball back-heel while diving forward.

== Career statistics ==
=== Club ===
Club	Season	League		
Club	Season	Division	Apps	Goals
1. FC Kaiserslautern	1939–40	Gauliga Südwest/Mainhessen	15	21
1. FC Kaiserslautern	1940–41	Gauliga Südwest/Mainhessen	12	16
1. FC Kaiserslautern	1941–42	Gauliga Südwest/Mainhessen	14	39
1. FC Kaiserslautern	1942–43	Gauliga Südwest/Mainhessen	3	1
1. FC Kaiserslautern	1945–46	Oberliga Südwest	14	16
1. FC Kaiserslautern	1946–47	Oberliga Südwest	14	22
1. FC Kaiserslautern	1947–47	Oberliga Südwest	24	31
1. FC Kaiserslautern	1948–49	Oberliga Südwest	22	30
1. FC Kaiserslautern	1949–50	Oberliga Südwest	26	34
1. FC Kaiserslautern	1950–51	Oberliga Südwest	19	5
1. FC Kaiserslautern	1951–52	Oberliga Südwest	27	19
1. FC Kaiserslautern	1952–53	Oberliga Südwest	30	38
1. FC Kaiserslautern	1953–54	Oberliga Südwest	29	20
1. FC Kaiserslautern	1954–55	Oberliga Südwest	21	10
1. FC Kaiserslautern	1955–56	Oberliga Südwest	25	16
1. FC Kaiserslautern	1956–57	Oberliga Südwest	21	15
1. FC Kaiserslautern	1957–58	Oberliga Südwest	26	5
1. FC Kaiserslautern	1958–59	Oberliga Südwest	22	10
Total			364	348

=== International ===
Scores and results list Germany's goal tally first, score column indicates score after each Walter goal.

List of international goals scored by Fritz Walter
No.	Date	Venue	Opponent	Score	Result	Competition	Ref.
1	14 July 1940	Frankfurt, Germany	Romania	4–0	9–3	Friendly	
2	14 July 1940	Frankfurt, Germany	Romania	8–2	9–3	Friendly	
3	14 July 1940	Frankfurt, Germany	Romania	9–3	9–3	Friendly	
4	1 September 1940	Leipzig, Germany	Finland	–	13–0	Friendly	
5	1 September 1940	Leipzig, Germany	Finland	–	13–0	Friendly	
6	9 March 1941	Stuttgart, Germany	Switzerland	–	4–2	Friendly	
7	6 April 1941	Cologne, Germany	Hungary	–	7–0	Friendly	
8	1 June 1941	Stadionul Republicii, Bucharest, Romania	Romania	2–0	4–1	Friendly	
9	15 June 1941	Vienna, Austria	Croatia	–	5–1	Friendly	
10	15 June 1941	Vienna, Austria	Croatia	–	5–1	Friendly	
11	5 October 1941	Råsunda Stadium, Stockholm, Sweden	Sweden	2–4	2–4	Friendly	
12	7 December 1941	Wrocław, Poland	Slovakia	–	4–0	Friendly	
13	3 May 1942	Népstadion, Budapest, Hungary	Hungary	1–0	5–3	Friendly	
14	3 May 1942	Népstadion, Budapest, Hungary	Hungary	3–3	5–3	Friendly	
15	16 August 1942	Bytom, Poland	Romania	1–0	7–0	Friendly	
16	16 August 1942	Bytom, Poland	Romania	2–0	7–0	Friendly	
17	16 August 1942	Bytom, Poland	Romania	3–0	7–0	Friendly	
18	18 October 1942	Wankdorf Stadium, Bern, Switzerland	Switzerland	–	5–3	Friendly	
19	1 November 1942	Neckarstadion, Stuttgart, Germany	Croatia	2–0	5–1	Friendly	
20	15 April 1951	Letzigrund, Zurich, Switzerland	Switzerland	–	3–2	Friendly	
21	17 October 1951	Dalymount Park, Dublin, Republic of Ireland	Republic of Ireland	2–2	2–3	Friendly	
22	9 November 1952	Rosenaustadion, Augsburg, Germany	Switzerland	–	5–1	Friendly	
23	21 December 1952	Südweststadion, Ludwigshafen, Germany	Yugoslavia	–	3–2	Friendly	
24	19 August 1953	Ullevaal Stadion, Oslo, Norway	Norway	1–1	1–1	1954 FIFA World Cup qualification	
25	22 November 1953	Volksparkstadion, Hamburg, Germany	Norway	3–1	5–1	1954 FIFA World Cup qualification	
26	25 April 1954	St. Jakob Stadium, Basel, Switzerland	Switzerland	–	5–3	Friendly	
27	25 April 1954	St. Jakob Stadium, Basel, Switzerland	Switzerland	–	5–3	Friendly	
28	23 June 1954	Letzigrund, Zurich, Switzerland	Turkey	6–1	7–2	1954 FIFA World Cup	
29	30 June 1954	St. Jakob Stadium, Basel, Switzerland	Austria	3–1	6–1	1954 FIFA World Cup	
30	30 June 1954	St. Jakob Stadium, Basel, Switzerland	Austria	5–1	6–1	1954 FIFA World Cup	
31	21 August 1955	Central Dynamo Stadium, Moscow, USSR	Soviet Union	–	2–3	Friendly	
32	16 November 1955	Wildparkstadion, Karlsruhe, Germany	Norway	–	2–0	Friendly	
33	26 May 1956	Olympiastadion, Berlin, Germany	England	1–3	1–3	Friendly	

== Honours ==
=== Club ===
1. FC Kaiserslautern

German football championship: 1950–51, 1952–53

=== International ===
West Germany

FIFA World Cup: 1954

=== Individual ===
- FIFA World Cup Bronze Ball: 1954
- FIFA World Cup All-Star Team: 1954
- FIFA Order of Merit: 1995
- UEFA German Golden Player: 2003
- UEFA Jubilee Poll (2004): #68
- Member of Germany's Sports Hall of Fame

== See also ==
- List of one-club men
- List of men's footballers with 500 or more goals

== Notes and references ==
Notes

Sporting positions
Preceded by Paul Janes	West Germany captain 1951–1956	Succeeded by Hans Schäfer
