= Headis =

Ball game

Headis is a mix of table tennis and the heading of association football. It is played at a regular table tennis table so it combines tactical elements of table tennis and the legwork of tennis. In mid-2016, the 11th Headis World Championship was held with players from 12 countries.

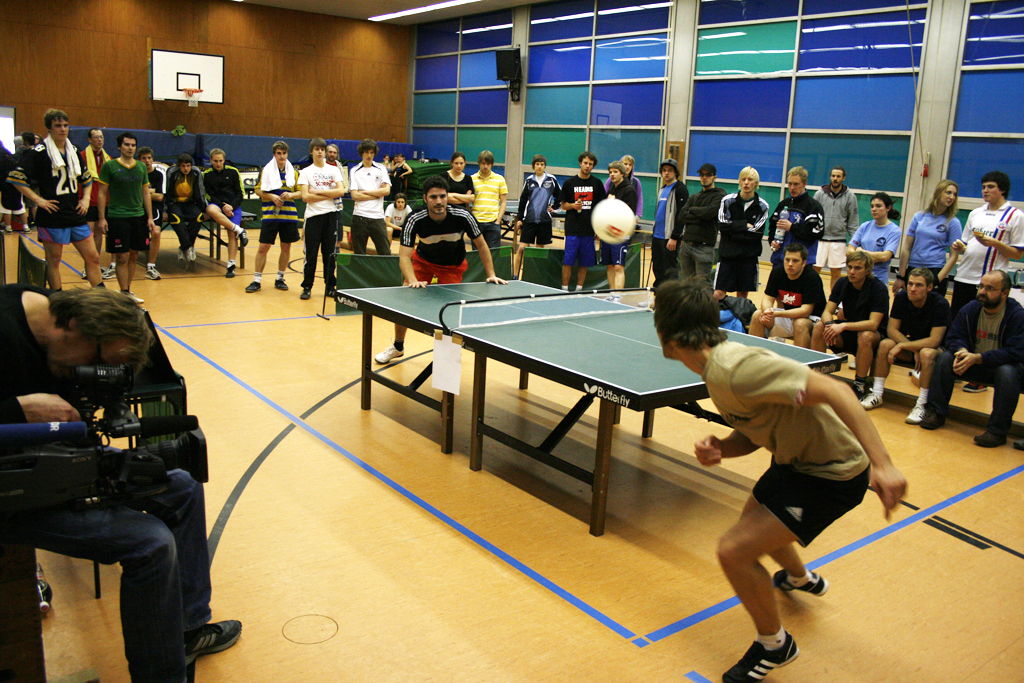
Two Headis players at a final of a tournament in Göttingen, Germany

== History ==
Headis (head + the ending of tennis) was invented in 2006 by the at that time sport student René Wegner. A football pitch in Kaiserslautern, Germany was occupied but the table tennis table was available so they started playing a rubber ball only with their heads.

=== Initial spreading ===
Headis started spreading throughout German students. The Universität des Saarlandes was the first institution with regular Headis training. More and more universities added the sport to their schedule.

Besides universities there are also other possibilities to play Headis. The 1. FC Kaiserslautern and the SV Darmstadt 98 offer regular training.

=== Beginning of the tournament series ===
In 2008, the first Headis World Cup Tournaments were hosted.

In 2010 and 2011 in Kaiserslautern, there was the adh-Trophy Headis (Allgemeiner Deutscher Hochschulsportverband), which is the German University Headis Championship.

In 2016, there were eleven World Cup Tournaments with more than 1,000 competitors.

=== Recent history ===
Several TV appearances and viral videos online increased the popularity within the last years. Currently, 18 German universities offer regular Headis courses.

By 2016, there were international tournaments, World and European Championships and an estimated number of players of 100,000. Starting at Universität des Saarlandes the sport spread all over Germany.

The sport is popular in other countries than Germany as well. There are official partners in Switzerland, Belgium, the Netherlands, Czech Republic, the Dominican Republic, China, Australia and Japan.

Every year there are 10 to 12 tournaments that are the base for the Headis World Championship.

== Rules and gameplay ==
Two players play at a regular table tennis table and the ball must only make contact with the head. The table, however, can be touched by any part of your body. Playing a volley is allowed as well. After every ball played, you have to touch the ground before heading the next ball.

Sets are played to eleven (11) points, with the exception that players must win by two (2) points. Games are decided by best-of-three (3) sets.

== Equipment ==
- Table tennis table: Headis is played at a regular table tennis table. The measurements are the same. As the Headis ball is heavier than a table tennis ball, the net is made of metal so it is more stable.
- Headis ball: Headis is played with a special ball. It consists of rubber, weighs about 100 grams (3.5 oz), and has a circumference of 50 centimetres (20 in).

== Tournament Series ==
=== Setup of the Tournament Series ===
Every year there are 10 to 12 Headis World Cup Tournaments held. The results of these tournaments is the basis for the Headis World Ranking.

=== Player names ===
The players do not use their regular names at the tournaments. They instead choose joke names like "Headi Potter" or "Rolli der Schlächter".

=== World ranking ===
The Headis World Ranking is compiled by the results of the Headis World Cup Tournaments. The players receive World Ranking points according to their ranking at the tournaments. The bigger the tournament, the more points the players get. The last 15 tournaments build the ranking. As of May 2017, the two top players in the world are Cornelius "Headsinfarkt" Döll (1,624 points) and Margarita "Klausi" Marmol Fernandez (890 points).

=== Most important tournaments ===
==== World Championship ====
The annual Headis World Championship is the most important tournament all year. It is the only tournament with unlimited players and it affects the World Ranking more than every other tournament. At the World Championship 2016 there were players from 12 nations.

Year	World Champion (Men)	World Champion (Women)
2006	Ronnie aus dem Osten	-
2007	Fefe the Gripper	Das pulsierend pokernde Party Pony
2008	Marvelous 96	Shorey
2009	Marvelous 96	Hoshi
2010	Lord Voldehead	Hoshi
2011	Marvelous 96	Hoshi
2012	Heineken	Hoshi
2013	Headsinfarkt	Headi Bobics junger Tatapan
2014	Heineken	Red Hot Chili Headers Missing Pepper
2015	Headsinfarkt	Red Hot Chili Headers Missing Pepper
2016	Headsinfarkt	Klausi
2017	Sebastian Headdel	Klausi
2018	Headsinfarkt	Jana Kournikova

==== European Championship ====
Since 2015, a European Headis Championship (EC) is hosted. The EC is the only tournament where men and women play the same competition. In 2015, four countries competed: Germany, Czech Republic, Switzerland and Belgium. In 2016, the Dominican Republic joined the tournament as well. The EC does not affect the World Ranking.

Year	European Champion
2015	Sniper Schorsch
2016	Headsinfarkt
2017	Headsinfarkt

==== Headis Masters ====
Since 2011, the annual Headis Masters is hosted. The 18 best men and the eight best women of the last calendar year qualify for it. The starting field is completed by two wildcards each.

Year	Masters Winner (Men)	Masters Winner (Women)
2011	Heineken	-
2012	Promilla	-
2013	Headbrötchen mit Zwiebeln	Hoshi
2014	Lauchgesicht	Red Hot Chili Headers missing Pepper
2015	Sniper Schorsch	Headi Bobics junger Tatapan
2016	Headsinfarkt	Headi Bobics junger Tatapan
2017	Headsinfarkt	Klausi
2018	Pressure Pete	Red Hot Chili Headers missing Pepper
