= SC Union 06 Berlin =

- Full name: Sport-Club Union 06 Berlin e.V.
- Founded: 9 June 1950; 76 years ago (Preceded by FC Olympia Oberschöneweide, founded in 1906)
- Ground: Poststadion
- Capacity: 10,000
- Chairman: Detlef Bucke
- Manager: Jürgen Beyer
- League: Bezirksliga Berlin (VIII)
- 2015–16: Landesliga Berlin 2 (VII), 14th (relegated)
| Home colours | Away colours |

Sport-Club Union 06 Berlin e.V. is a German association football club based in central Berlin.

Like namesake 1. FC Union Berlin, the club traces its origin back to the FC Olympia Oberschöneweide, formed in 1906, but the current SC Union was formed in June 1950. It had its greatest success in the early 1950s when it won the tier one Oberliga Berlin in 1953, having finished runners-up in the previous two seasons. The 1952–53 league championship entitled the club to participate in the 1953 German football championship, where it was knocked-out in the group stage.

In 1976, the club unsuccessfully took part in the promotion round to the 2. Bundesliga and, in the following season, participated in the DFB-Pokal.

== History ==
SC Union 06 Berlin traces its roots back to the FC Olympia Oberschöneweide, a club formed in 1906. Renamed to SC Union Oberschöneweide the predecessor club won the Berlin championship in 1920, 1923, 1940 and 1948 as well as the Berlin Cup in 1947 and 1948. Union's greatest success however came in the 1923 German football championship where it reached the final but lost 3–0 to Hamburger SV. After the Second World War the club reformed as Sportgemeinde Oberschöneweide. It took part in the 1948 German football championship but lost to 7–0 FC St. Pauli in the quarter-finals.

After a runners-up finish in the Oberliga Berlin in 1950 and qualification to the 1950 German football championship Union was refused permission to travel to Kiel to play Hamburger SV by the Soviet occupation authorities. The team consequently decided to leave East Berlin for the western half of the city. It travelled to Kiel, lost 7–0 to HSV and shortly after formed a new club, the current SC Union 06 Berlin, on 9 June 1950 in West Berlin. SG Oberschöneweide continued to exist in East Berlin and eventually became what is now 1. FC Union Berlin. Another group of Union players formed BBC Südost, also based in the West, but the latter was disbanded in 1990.

The new club, now based in West Berlin and playing in the Oberliga Berlin which now did not include clubs from the East anymore, experienced an era of success from 1950 to 1953. Union finished runners-up in the league to Tennis Borussia Berlin in 1951 and 1952 but won the league in 1953. This title earned the club another trip to the German championship where it however finished last in its group with five defeats and one draw, playing against Hamburger SV, VfB Stuttgart and Borussia Dortmund. The club was well supported in its three home games during the 1953 German championship campaign, drawing 85,000 against HSV and 35,000 each against the other two, with all three games being played at the Olympiastadion. Union slowly declined from there. It finished third in the league in 1954 and 1957, but after that, dropped into the relegation zone. Support from the eastern part of Berlin dried up completely after the construction of the Berlin Wall. The club was relegated from the Oberliga in 1960, won promotion back in 1961 and was relegated again in 1962.

After the Introduction of the Bundesliga in 1963 Union played a season in the tier two Regionalliga Berlin in 1963–64 but came last and was relegated back to the Amateurliga. The club dropped out of this level in 1966 and 1970 but returned on each occasion. From 1972 onwards it experienced a small revival, winning the Amateurliga in 1976. It took part in the promotion round to the 2. Bundesliga but was unsuccessful there, competing against Arminia Hannover and SC Herford, and, in any case, would have struggled financially to compete in professional football. The club made its one and only appearance in the DFB-Pokal in 1976–77 but lost 12–1 to VfL Osnabrück in the first round. Union was relegated from what was now the tier three Amateur-Oberliga Berlin in 1982. It briefly returned to the league in the 1984–85 season but was relegated again straight away and never returned to the highest level of play in Berlin again.

With German reunification Union made contact again with 1. FC Union and the two clubs engaged in cooperation for a time. Financial reasons led the clubs to grow apart again and a dispute over the stadium Alten Försterei saw 1. FC Union maintain its rights while Union 06 missed out. The club merged with SG Oberschöneweide in 1995 and played as SC Union 06 Oberschöneweide for a time but soon reverted to its old name. The club dropped as far as the tier nine Kreisliga B by 2000. It revived its relationship with 1. FC Union and, on occasions, played friendlies against the other club. A potential merger of the two clubs was however declined by the members.

Population changes in the suburb of Moabit, their home district, have led to the integration of many non-German residents in the club, something the club has won praise and awards for in the past. On the field, after its descent to the Kreisliga B, the club recovered, returning to the tier seven Landesliga Berlin in 2014 but being relegated from this level again in 2016.

In January 2015, Union 06 and 1. FC Union played a friendly, with the proceeds from the game going towards the integration of refugees. It was the second meeting of the two clubs, the previous one having been held on 23 May 2006 to celebrate the 100th anniversary of the mother club.

== Honours ==
The club's honours:

- Oberliga Berlin
  - Champions: 1952–53
  - Runners-up: 1950–51, 1951–52
- Amateurliga Berlin
  - Champions: 1960–61, 1975–76

== Recent seasons ==
The recent season-by-season performance of the club:

| Season | Division | Tier | Position |
|---|---|---|---|
| 2003–04 | Kreisliga B Group 3 | IX | 13th |
| 2004–05 | Kreisliga B Group 2 | IX | 6th |
| 2005–06 | Kreisliga B Group 2 | IX | 2nd ↑ |
| 2006–07 | Kreisliga A Group 1 | VIII | 2nd ↑ |
| 2007–08 | Bezirksliga Group 2 | VII | 15th ↓ |
| 2008–09 | Kreisliga A Group 1 | IX | 1st ↑ |
| 2009–10 | Bezirksliga Group 1 | VIII | 9th |
| 2010–11 | Bezirksliga Group 1 | VIII | 11th |
| 2011–12 | Bezirksliga Group 3 | VIII | 7th |
| 2012–13 | Bezirksliga Group 1 | VIII | 5th |
| 2013–14 | Bezirksliga Group 3 | VIII | 2nd ↑ |
| 2014–15 | Landesliga Group 2 | VII | 11th |
| 2015–16 | Landesliga Group 2 | VII | 14th ↓ |
| 2016–17 | Bezirksliga Berlin | VIII | |

- With the introduction of the Regionalligas in 1994 and the 3. Liga in 2008 as the new third tier, below the 2. Bundesliga, all leagues below dropped one tier.

| ↑ Promoted | ↓ Relegated |
