= Waldstadion am Erbsenberg =

Football stadium located in Kaiserslautern, Germany

Coordinates: 49°26′14″N 7°47′5.7″E

Waldstadion am Erbsenberg is a football stadium located in Kaiserslautern, Germany. Its primary tenant is VfR Kaiserslautern. The stadium, which was built in 1938, was originally designed to hold 15,000 spectators, but is currently approved to hold only 5,000. The stadium hosted part of the German Monsters of Rock tour in 1983.
