= Karl Adams =

Karl Adams may refer to:

- Karl Adams (mathematician) (1811–1849), Swiss mathematician
- Karl Adams (baseball) (1891–1967), American baseball player

== See also ==
- Carl Adams (disambiguation)
- Karl Adam (disambiguation)
