= Carl Adams =

Carl Adams may refer to:

- Carl Adams (racing driver) (born 1942), American NASCAR driver
- Carl Adams (wrestler) (born 1950), American wrestler and businessman

== See also ==
- Karl Adams (disambiguation)
