= Felix Gerritzen =

German footballer (1927–2007)

Personal information
- Date of birth: 6 February 1927
- Place of birth: Münster, Germany
- Date of death: 3 July 2007 (aged 80)
- Position: Forward

Senior career*
Years	Team	Apps	(Gls)
1945–1950	VfB Oldenburg		
1950–1958	Preußen Münster	166	(83)
1958–1964	Saxonia Münster		

International career
1951	Germany	4	(1)
- * Club domestic league appearances and goals

Felix Gerritzen (6 February 1927 – 3 July 2007) was a German footballer who played as a forward for VfB Oldenburg and Preußen Münster.
