= Alfred Preissler =

German footballer and manager (1921–2003)

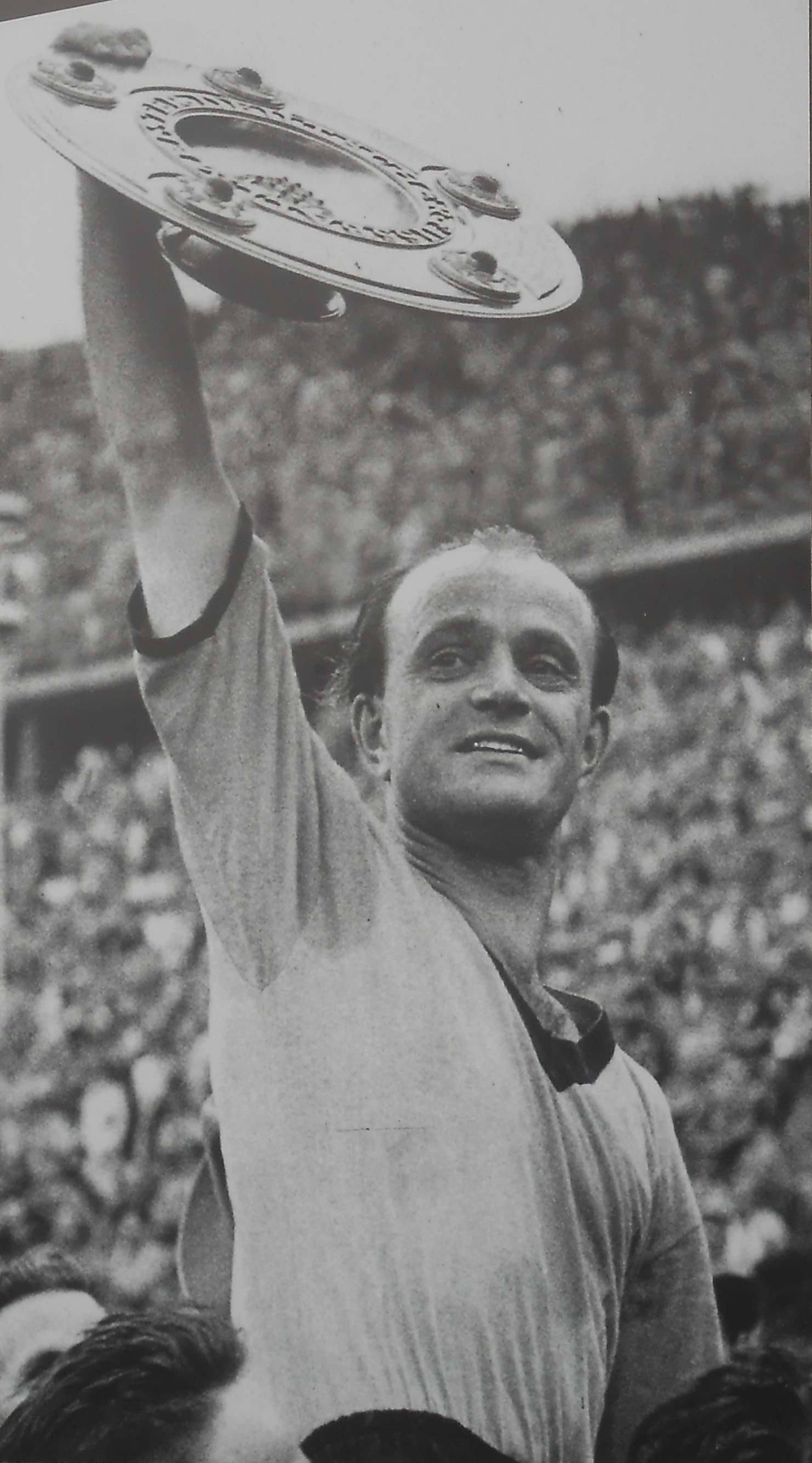
- Preißler with the championship trophy in 1956

Personal information
- Date of birth: 9 April 1921
- Place of birth: Duisburg, Germany
- Date of death: 15 July 2003 (aged 82)
- Position: Forward

Youth career
- –1939: Duisburger SV 1900

Senior career*
Years	Team	Apps	(Gls)
1939–1944	Duisburger SV 1900		
1944–1945	Duisburger SpV		
1946–1950	Borussia Dortmund	78	(45)
1950–1951	Preußen Münster	28	(19)
1951–1959	Borussia Dortmund	211	(123)
Total		317	(187)

International career
1951	West Germany	2	(0)

Managerial career
- 1957: Hammer SpVg
- 1958: ASSV Letmathe
- 1960–1962: Borussia Neunkirchen
- 1962–1965: FK Pirmasens
- 1965–1967: Wuppertaler SV
- 1968–1971: Rot-Weiß Oberhausen
- 1971–1973: Borussia Neunkirchen
- 1974–1975: Rot-Weiß Oberhausen
- * Club domestic league appearances and goals

Alfred Preissler (9 April 1921 – 15 July 2003) was a German footballer and manager who played as a forward mostly for Borussia Dortmund. He is the club's all-time top goalscorer with 177 goals.

The worker's son grew up in Duisburg, in the local Dickelsbach settlement, which represents a remarkable chapter in German industrial history. He began his football career in his hometown at the Duisburger SV 1900, where at the same time Toni Turek, the world champion of 1954, was also trained. He played for the club until 1944, before moving to Duisburger SpV and 1946 to Borussia Dortmund. With this club he won back-to-back German championships in 1956 and 1957.

He also played two matches for the then West Germany national football team in 1951 against Austria and the Republic of Ireland.
