= David Schramm =

David Schramm may refer to:

- David Schramm (astrophysicist) (1945–1997), American astrophysicist and educator
- David Schramm (actor) (1946–2020), American actor
- Dave Schramm (American football) (born 1963), American football offensive coordinator
- Dave Schramm (musician) (fl. 1990s–2010s), American guitarist

== See also ==
- Dávid Schram (born 1976), Hungarian musician and record producer
