= Karl Ferdinand Adam =

German composer, cantor, and music director

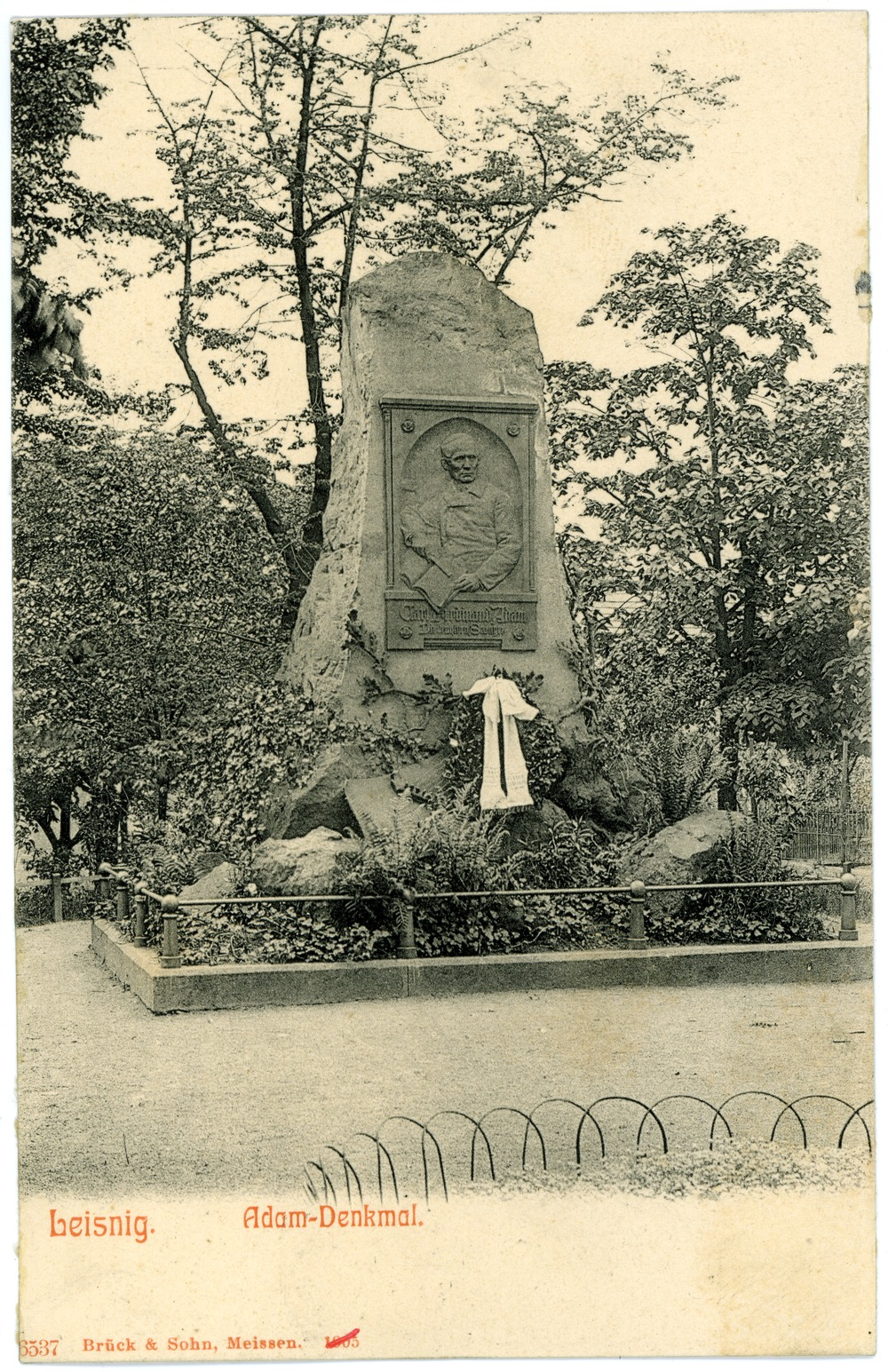
Memorial in Leisnig (1905)

Karl Ferdinand Adam (22 December 1806 – 23 December 1868) was a German composer, cantor, and music director.

Adam was born in Constappel (now a part of Klipphausen, Saxony). He moved to Leisnig, where he served as cantor and music director. He composed popular choruses and quartets for men's voices, as well as songs and piano pieces. He died in Leisnig.
