= Dietmar Schwager =

German footballer and manager (1940–2018)

Personal information
- Date of birth: 15 August 1940
- Date of death: 20 November 2018 (aged 78)
- Place of death: Kaiserslautern-Dansenberg
- Height: 1.79 m (5 ft 10 in)
- Position: Defender

Senior career*
Years	Team	Apps	(Gls)
1963–1964	VfR 1906 Kaiserslautern	24	(1)
1964–1976	1. FC Kaiserslautern	320	(2)

Managerial career
- 1978–1979: Borussia Neunkirchen
- 1979–1980: FC Schalke 04
- 1980–1981: FSV Frankfurt
- * Club domestic league appearances and goals

Dietmar Schwager (15 August 1940 – 20 November 2018) was a German football coach and player. As a player, he spent 12 seasons in the Bundesliga with 1. FC Kaiserslautern.

== Honours ==
- DFB-Pokal finalist: 1972, 1976.
