= Carsten Rump =

German footballer and manager

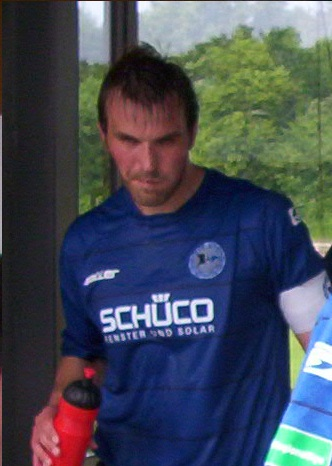

Personal information
- Date of birth: 31 March 1981 (age 45)
- Place of birth: Dessau, East Germany
- Height: 1.82 m (6 ft 0 in)
- Position: Defender

Team information
- Current team: SV Rödinghausen (Manager)

Youth career
- SC Herford

Senior career*
Years	Team	Apps	(Gls)
2001–2005	Arminia Bielefeld II	100	(10)
2002	Arminia Bielefeld	2	(0)
2005–2008	VfB Lübeck	74	(4)
2008–2015	Arminia Bielefeld II	259	(24)
2010	Arminia Bielefeld	1	(0)
Total		436	(38)

Managerial career
- 2016: Arminia Bielefeld (Caretaker)
- 2017: Arminia Bielefeld (Caretaker)
- 2021–: SV Rödinghausen
- * Club domestic league appearances and goals

Carsten Rump (born 31 March 1981) is a German former professional footballer and manager. In his active career, he played as a defender for Arminia Bielefeld and VfB Lübeck.
