= Werner Liebrich =

German footballer (1927–1995)

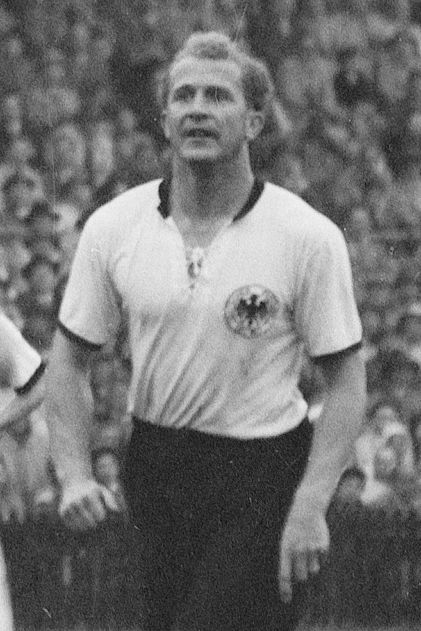
- Liebrich in 1954

Personal information
- Date of birth: 18 January 1927
- Place of birth: Kaiserslautern, Germany
- Date of death: 20 March 1995 (aged 68)
- Place of death: Kaiserslautern, Germany
- Height: 1.76 m (5 ft 9 in)
- Position: Defender

Youth career
- 1938–1943: 1. FC Kaiserslautern

Senior career*
Years	Team	Apps	(Gls)
1943–1962	1. FC Kaiserslautern	273	(25)

International career
1951–1956	West Germany	16	(0)

Managerial career
- 1965: 1. FC Kaiserslautern
Medal record
Men's football
Representing West Germany
FIFA World Cup
Winner	1954 Switzerland
- * Club domestic league appearances and goals

Werner Liebrich (18 January 1927 – 20 March 1995) was a German footballer who played in the centre back position. He is notable for his role in the West Germany triumph in the 1954 FIFA World Cup, and spending his entire playing career of almost twenty years with hometown club 1. FC Kaiserslautern, with whom he also briefly coached.

== Early life ==
Liebrich was brought up in Kaiserslautern to a worker's family who were members of the Social Democratic German party SPD.

== Career ==
At club level, Liebrich played solely for 1. FC Kaiserslautern, and breaking into the first team in the 1940s. He was in the 1950s part of the team that won the German championship in the 1951 and 1953 seasons.

He appeared sixteen times for the West Germany national team, and was a member of the West Germany team that won the 1954 FIFA World Cup, in which he played in the final. He was the player who injured Hungarian team captain Ferenc Puskás during the two teams' first game in the tournament in the group stage. Puskás was forced to miss the next two matches in the tournament, but played in the final against Germany, not wholly fit, in which the Germans won 3–2, Hungary's first defeat in four years.

In 1950, A.C. Milan offered him a contract which he declined to stay at his hometown club.

Apart from winning the German championship with Kaiserslautern in 1951 and 1953, the pinnacle of Liebrich's career were his defensive performances during the 1954 FIFA World Cup, especially in the quarter final against Yugoslavia. After the 1954 World Cup, one of his best performances came in the game against England at Wembley on 1 December 1954. He effectively marked English centre forward Ronnie Allen and also helped out covering Stanley Matthews.

Liebrich retired from playing in 1962, after nearly twenty years with his hometown club; however he came back for a coaching stint in the 1964–65 season and was celebrated as saving his club from relegation.

== Death ==
In March 1995, Liebrich died of heart failure aged 68, in Kaiserslautern.
