= Horst Eckel =

German footballer (1932–2021)

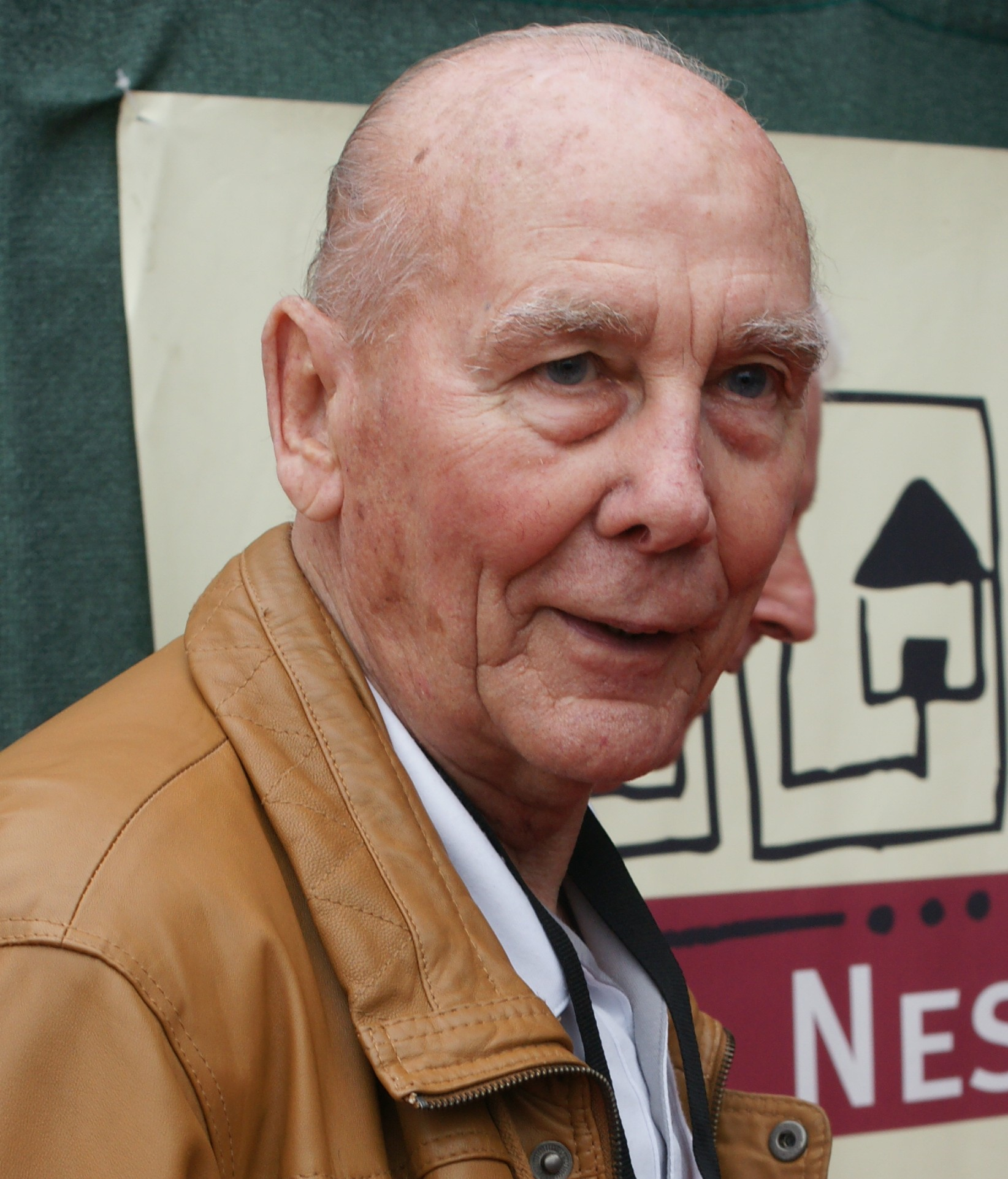
- Eckel in 2014

Personal information
- Date of birth: 8 February 1932
- Place of birth: Vogelbach, Bavaria, Germany
- Date of death: 3 December 2021 (aged 89)
- Height: 1.80 m (5 ft 11 in)
- Position: Wing-half

Youth career
- SC Vogelbach

Senior career*
Years	Team	Apps	(Gls)
1949–1960	1. FC Kaiserslautern	214	(34)
1960–1966	SV Röchling Völklingen		

International career
1952–1958	West Germany	32	(0)
Medal record
Men's football
Representing West Germany
FIFA World Cup
Winner	1954 Switzerland
- * Club domestic league appearances and goals

Horst Eckel (8 February 1932 – 3 December 2021) was a German footballer who played as a wing-half. He was part of the West Germany national team that won the 1954 FIFA World Cup. He was the last surviving player of the 1954 World Cup Final.

== Club career ==
Eckel debuted in 1. FC Kaiserslautern's first team in 1947 at the age of 15. He won the German football championship with Kaiserslautern in 1951 and 1953. Eckel was playing as a right half back. As a player, Eckel was assiduous and adroit. Because of his rapid way of playing, he got the nickname Windhund (sighthound). He later played for SV Röchling Völklingen in the Regionalliga Südwest.

== International career ==
Eckel was part of the West German team that won the 1954 FIFA World Cup and achieved the "Miracle of Bern". During that tournament, Eckel became an important pillar of the successful West Germany national team. The strength of the right side of Sepp Herberger's team was made possible due to Eckel's high defensive workrate and his passes, from which outside right Helmut Rahn and inside right Max Morlock benefitted enormously.

He also participated in the 1958 FIFA World Cup. In total he earned 32 caps.

== Later life ==
After his career, he retrained from toolmaker to teacher, a profession he practised until his retirement in 1997.

He was an advisor for The Miracle of Bern, Sönke Wortmann's movie about the 1954 FIFA World Cup.

Eckel died on 3 December 2021, at the age of 89. At the time of his death, Horst Eckel was not only the last surviving footballer who participated in the 1954 World Cup Final, but also the last surviving footballer from West Germany's 1954 World Cup squad.
