= 1958–59 European Cup =

European football tournament

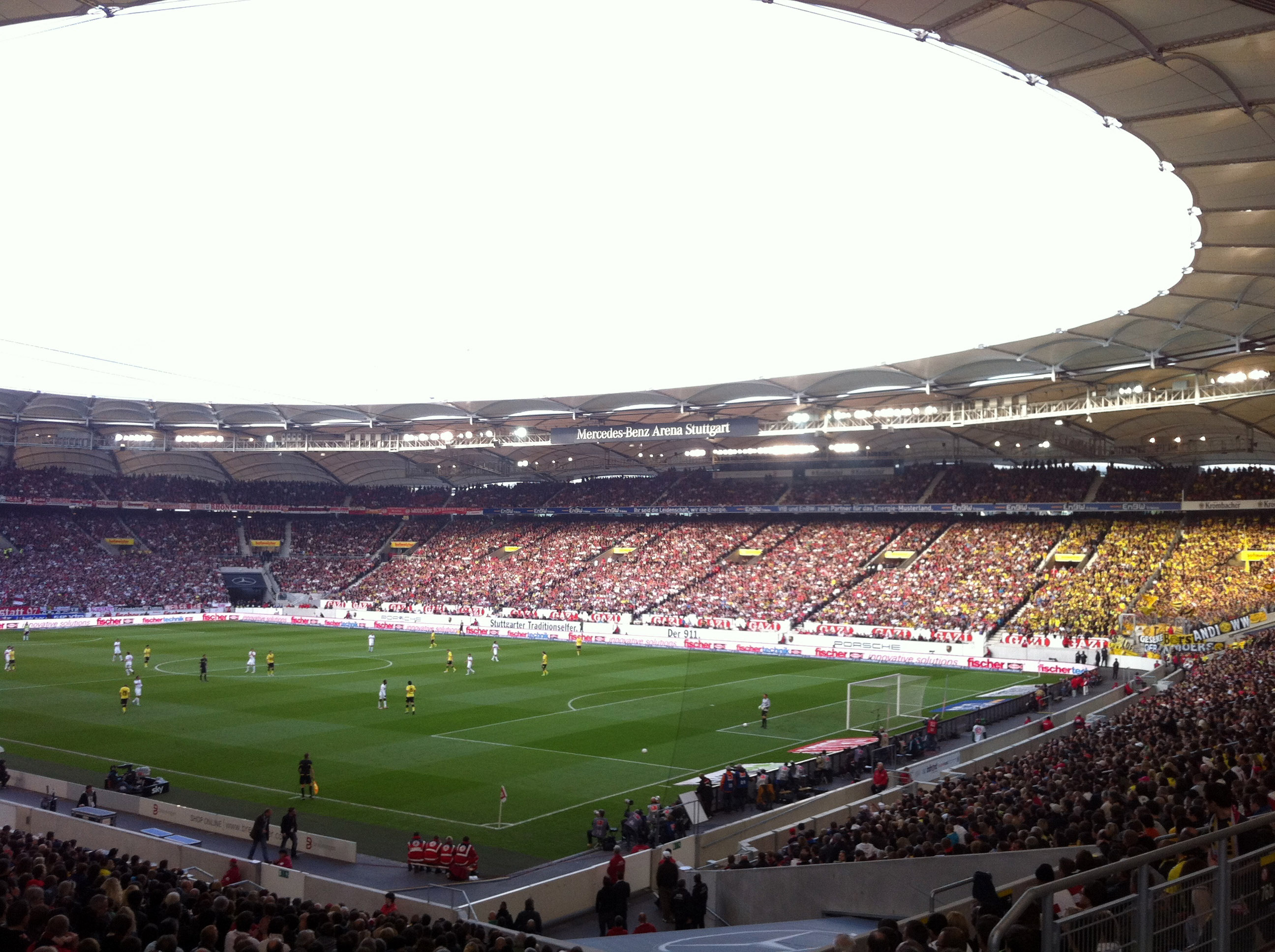
- The Neckarstadion in Stuttgart hosted the final.

Tournament details
- Dates: 26 August 1958 – 3 June 1959
- Teams: 28 (26 competed) (from 25 associations)

Final positions
- Champions: (Spain) Real Madrid (4th title)
- Runners-up: (France) Reims

Tournament statistics
- Matches played: 55
- Goals scored: 199 (3.62 per match)
- Attendance: 1,980,818 (36,015 per match)
- Top scorer(s): Just Fontaine (Reims); 10 goals

The 1958–59 European Cup was the fourth season of the European Cup, Europe's premier club football tournament. The competition was won by Real Madrid, who beat Reims 2–0 in the final at Neckarstadion, Stuttgart, on 3 June 1959. This was Real Madrid's fourth European Cup title in a row. The two finalists also competed in the final of the first European Cup in 1956.

It was the first time that a team from Finland participated, while Turkey's representative returned to the competition in the presence of Beşiktaş. They were drawn against Olympiacos, but Greece's first entrants withdrew for political reasons before playing their first tie.

Also, Manchester United were invited to the competition following Munich air disaster in the previous season, but were not allowed to participate by the Football League, meaning that first walkovers took place in the UEFA organised competition. Had they played, England would be first nation in European Cup history to have more than one team in the competition, apart from title holder's association.

On road to winning the competition Real Madrid faced Atlético Madrid in the semi-finals – the first time a derby match was played in the competition.

== Teams ==
A total of 28 teams were placed in the competition bracket, but finally only 26 participated.

Spain continued to be represented by its runners-up, as its champions Real Madrid had already qualified as holders. This was the first time that Rapid Wien and AGF Aarhus failed to qualify for the tournament, which made Real Madrid the only club to appear in all four editions of European Cup. Wiener Sport-Club, Standard Liège, Kjøbenhavns Boldklub, Wolverhampton Wanderers, Helsingin Palloseura, Schalke 04, Drumcondra, Juventus, Jeunesse Esch, VV DOS, Ards, Polonia Bytom, Petrolul Ploiești, Heart of Midlothian, Atlético Madrid, IFK Göteborg, Beşiktaş and NK Dinamo Zagreb made their debut in the competition.

All entrants were their respective associations champions, except for KB, Manchester United, Polonia Bytom and Atlético Madrid.

(Austria) Wiener Sport-Club (1st)	(Belgium) Standard Liège (1st)	(Bulgaria) CDNA Sofia (1st)	(Czechoslovakia) Dukla Prague (1st)
(Denmark) KB (5th)	(East Germany) Wismut Karl-Marx-Stadt (1st)	(England) Wolverhampton Wanderers (1st)	(England) Manchester United (9th)
(Finland) Helsingin Palloseura (1st)	(France) Reims (1st)	(Greece) Olympiacos (1st)	(Hungary) MTK (1st)
(Italy) Juventus (1st)	(Luxembourg) Jeunesse Esch (1st)	(Netherlands) VV DOS (1st)	(Northern Ireland) Ards (1st)
(Poland) Polonia Bytom (2nd)	(Portugal) Sporting CP (1st)	(Republic of Ireland) Drumcondra (1st)	(Romania) Petrolul Ploiești (1st)
(Scotland) Heart of Midlothian (1st)	(Spain) Real Madrid (1st)^{TH}	(Spain) Atlético Madrid (2nd)	(Sweden) IFK Göteborg (1st)
(Switzerland) Young Boys (1st)	(Turkey) Beşiktaş (1st)	(West Germany) Schalke 04 (1st)	(Socialist Federal Republic of Yugoslavia) NK Dinamo Zagreb (1st)

== Preliminary round ==
Location of teams in the 1958–59 European Cup

The draw for the preliminary round took place in Cannes, France, on Wednesday, 2 July 1958. As title holders, Real Madrid received a bye, and the remaining 27 teams were grouped geographically into three pots. The first drawn team in each pot also received bye, while the remaining clubs would play the preliminary round in August, September and October.

	Pot 1 Western Europe	Pot 2 Central Europe	Pot 3 Eastern Europe
Drawn	France; Republic of Ireland; Northern Ireland; Netherlands; Belgium; Scotland; Portugal; Spain	Switzerland; West Germany; Italy; Sweden; Denmark; Luxembourg; Austria; Manchester United (Note: Invitees Manchester United were in Pot 2 because they could not play against an English club before the first round.)	Poland; Romania; Turkey; Yugoslavia; Czechoslovakia; Hungary; East Germany; Greece
Byes	(England) Wolverhampton Wanderers	(Finland) Helsingin Palloseura	(Bulgaria) CDNA Sofia

The calendar was decided by the involved teams, with all matches to be played by 30 September.

Team 1	Agg.	Team 2	1st leg	2nd leg	Play-off
Standard Liège (Belgium)	6–3	(Scotland) Heart of Midlothian	5–1	1–2	
Beşiktaş (Turkey)	(w/o) (Note: Olympiacos withdrew due to international political issues, refusing to play in Istanbul following the long-standing tension between Turkey and Greece.)	(Greece) Olympiacos	–	–	
Young Boys (Switzerland)	(w/o) (Note: UEFA invited Manchester United to enter the competition after eight of the club's players were killed in the Munich air disaster while returning from a European Cup match in Belgrade the previous season; however, the Football League refused to allow the club to compete. As the draw had already been made for the preliminary round, Manchester United's drawn opponents, Young Boys, were given a bye to the first round of the competition. Instead, the two clubs played a pair of friendlies against each other, home and away; Young Boys won the first match 2–0 in Bern, but Manchester United won 3–0 at Old Trafford a week later. The two clubs were again drawn together in the group stage of both the 2018–19 and 2021–22 UEFA Champions League seasons, with the former happening almost exactly 60 years after they were originally due to play.)	(England) Manchester United	–	–	
NK Dinamo Zagreb (Socialist Federal Republic of Yugoslavia)	3–4	(Czechoslovakia) Dukla Prague	2–2	1–2	
Jeunesse Esch (Luxembourg)	2–2	(Sweden) IFK Göteborg	1–2	1–0	1–5
Ards (Northern Ireland)	3–10	(France) Reims	1–4	2–6	
Wismut Karl-Marx-Stadt (East Germany)	4–4	(Romania) Petrolul Ploiești	4–2	0–2	4–0
Atlético Madrid (Spain)	13–1	(Republic of Ireland) Drumcondra	8–0	5–1	
Polonia Bytom (Poland)	0–6	(Hungary) MTK	0–3	0–3	
KB (Denmark)	5–5	(West Germany) Schalke 04	3–0	2–5	1–3
Juventus (Italy)	3–8	(Austria) Wiener Sport-Club	3–1	0–7	
VV DOS (Netherlands)	4–6	(Portugal) Sporting CP	3–4	1–2	

=== First leg ===
26 August 1958
20:00 CET

KB (Denmark)	3–0	(West Germany) Schalke 04
Birkeland 31', 46'; Krog 35'	Report

Idrætsparken, Copenhagen
Attendance: 15,000
Referee: Andries van Leeuwen (Netherlands)

3 September 1958
21:00 CET

Standard Liège (Belgium)	5–1	(Scotland) Heart of Midlothian
Jadot 17', 85'; Piters 34'; Bonga 73'; Houf 78'	Report	Crawford 14'

Stade de Sclessin, Liège
Attendance: 25,000
Referee: Pierre Schwinte (France)

10 September 1958
17:00 CET

NK Dinamo Zagreb (Socialist Federal Republic of Yugoslavia)	2–2	(Czechoslovakia) Dukla Prague
Lipošinović 70', 73'	Report	Borovička 31'; Brumovský 51'

Stadion Maksimir, Zagreb
Attendance: 25,000
Referee: Erich Steiner (Austria)

14 September 1958
21:00 CET

Jeunesse Esch (Luxembourg)	1–2	(Sweden) IFK Göteborg
May 20'	Report	N. Johansson 19'; B. Johansson 72'

Stade de la Frontière, Esch-sur-Alzette
Attendance: 3,500
Referee: Aage Poulsen (Denmark)

14 September 1958
22:00 CET

Ards (Northern Ireland)	1–4	(France) Reims
Lawry 87'	Report	Fontaine 26', 38', 45', 85'

Windsor Park, Belfast
Attendance: 20,000
Referee: José María Ortiz de Mendíbil (Spain)

17 September 1958
18:00 CET

Atlético Madrid (Spain)	8–0	(Republic of Ireland) Drumcondra
Peiró 2', 51'; Vavá 6', 61'; Collar 56', 76'; Mendonça 63', 67'	Report

Estadio Metropolitano de Madrid, Madrid
Attendance: 50,000
Referee: Giulio Campanati (Italy)

17 September 1958
21:00 CET

Wismut Karl-Marx-Stadt (East Germany)	4–2	(Romania) Petrolul Ploiești
Tröger 25'; Viertel 39', 68'; S. Kaiser 79'	Report	Dridea 7', 82'

Otto-Grotewohl-Stadion, Aue
Attendance: 12,000
Referee: Antonín Růžička (Czechoslovakia)

17 September 1958
21:00 CET

Polonia Bytom (Poland)	0–3	(Hungary) MTK
	Report	Sándor 46'; Palotás 73', 80' (pen.)

Stadion Polonii, Bytom
Attendance: 25,000
Referee: Werner Treichel (West Germany)

24 September 1958
22:30 CET

Juventus (Italy)	3–1	(Austria) Wiener Sport-Club
Sívori 2', 56', 62'	Report	Horak 8'

Stadio Olimpico di Torino, Turin
Attendance: 40,000
Referee: Josef Gulde (Switzerland)

1 October 1958
20:00 CET

VV DOS (Netherlands)	3–4	(Portugal) Sporting CP
Temming 48' (pen.); Van der Linden 52'; Luiten 88'	Report	Ivson 31', 83'; Hugo 41'; Vasques 55'

Stadion Galgenwaard, Utrecht
Attendance: 20,000
Referee: John Clough (England)

=== Second leg ===
9 September 1958
22:00 CET

Heart of Midlothian (Scotland)	2–1	(Belgium) Standard Liège
Bauld 55', 65'	Report	Givard 58'

Tynecastle Park, Edinburgh
Attendance: 37,500
Referee: Louis Fauquembergue (France)

Standard Liège won 6–3 on aggregate.

18 September 1958
21:00 CET

Schalke 04 (West Germany)	5–2	(Denmark) KB
Klodt 25', 34'; Sadlowski 46'; Nowak 70'; Brocker 72'	Report	Andersen 53', 66'

Glückauf-Kampfbahn, Gelsenkirchen
Attendance: 30,000
Referee: Willem Beltman (Netherlands)

KB 5–5 Schalke 04 on aggregate; play-off needed.

28 September 1958
19:00 CET

Petrolul Ploiești (Romania)	2–0	(East Germany) Wismut Karl-Marx-Stadt
Fronea 33'; Marinescu 79'	Report

Stadionul Petrolul, Ploiești
Attendance: 25,000
Referee: Václav Korelus (Czechoslovakia)

Wismut Karl-Marx-Stadt 4–4 Petrolul Ploiești on aggregate; play-off needed.

30 September 1958
20:00 CET

IFK Göteborg (Sweden)	0–1	(Luxembourg) Jeunesse Esch
	Report	May 21'

Nya Ullevi, Gothenburg
Attendance: 21,435
Referee: Valdemar Hansen (Denmark)

Jeunesse Esch 2–2 IFK Göteborg on aggregate; play-off needed.

1 October 1958
18:45 CET

Drumcondra (Republic of Ireland)	1–5	(Spain) Atlético Madrid
Fullam 51' (pen.)	Report	Peiró 16', 67'; Csóka 19'; Collar 45'; Vavá 86'

Dalymount Park, Dublin
Attendance: 20,000
Referee: Giulio Campanati (Italy)

Atlético Madrid won 13–1 on aggregate.

1 October 1958
19:00 CET

Wiener Sport-Club (Austria)	7–0	(Italy) Juventus
Skerlan 24'; Hamerl 34', 38', 64', 80'; Hof 82' (pen.), 85'	Report

Praterstadion, Vienna
Attendance: 35,000
Referee: Paul Wyssling (Switzerland)

Wiener Sport-Club won 8–3 on aggregate.

1 October 1958
20:00 CET

Dukla Prague (Czechoslovakia)	2–1	(Socialist Federal Republic of Yugoslavia) NK Dinamo Zagreb
Dvořák 30'; Vacenovský 71'	Report	Gašpert 45'

Stadion Letná, Prague
Attendance: 10,000
Referee: Erich Steiner (Austria)

Dukla Prague won 4–3 on aggregate.

1 October 1958
20:00 CET

MTK (Hungary)	3–0	(Poland) Polonia Bytom
Molnár 41'; Palotás 58' (pen.), 75'	Report

Hungária Körút, Budapest
Attendance: 10,000
Referee: Josef Kandlbinder (West Germany)

MTK won 6–0 on aggregate.

8 October 1958
20:00 CET

Reims (France)	6–2	(Northern Ireland) Ards
Piantoni 10', 40'; Fontaine 14', 16'; Bliard 20', 74'	Report	Lawther 10'; Quee 28'

Stade Auguste-Delaune, Reims
Attendance: 19,509
Referee: Manuel Asensi Martín (Spain)

Reims won 10–3 on aggregate.

8 October 1958
21:00 CET

Sporting CP (Portugal)	2–1	(Netherlands) VV DOS
Ivson 48', 76'	Report	Krommert 82'

Estádio José Alvalade, Lisbon
Attendance: 40,000
Referee: John Kelly (England)

Sporting CP won 6–4 on aggregate.

=== Play-off ===
1 October 1958
20:00 CET

Schalke 04 (West Germany)	3–1	(Denmark) KB
Klodt 57', 86'; Nowak 66'	Report	Krahmer 90'

Diekman Stadion, Enschede
Attendance: 27,000
Referee: Leo Horn (Netherlands)

Schalke 04 won play-off 3–1.

12 October 1958
19:00 CET

Wismut Karl-Marx-Stadt (East Germany)	4–0	(Romania) Petrolul Ploiești
Zink 4'; Tröger 7', 75' (pen.); Wolf 48'	Report

Nikita Khrushchev Republican Stadium, Kyiv
Attendance: 40,000
Referee: Karol Galba (Czechoslovakia)

Wismut Karl-Marx-Stadt won play-off 4–0.

15 October 1958
20:00 CET

IFK Göteborg (Sweden)	5–1	(Luxembourg) Jeunesse Esch
Andersson 37'; Berndtsson 59', 85'; B. Johansson 68'; N. Johansson 80'	Report	Meurisse 5'

Nya Ullevi, Gothenburg
Attendance: 11,780
Referee: Jarl Hansen (Denmark)

IFK Göteborg won play-off 5–1.

== Bracket ==
First round
(Austria) Wiener Sport-Club	3	0	3
(Czechoslovakia) Dukla Prague	1	1	2
(Spain) Real Madrid	2	1	3
(Turkey) Beşiktaş	0	1	1
(Spain) Atlético Madrid (a.e.t.)	2	0	2 (3)
(Bulgaria) CDNA Sofia	1	1	2 (1)
(England) Wolverhampton Wanderers	2	1	3
(West Germany) Schalke 04	2	2	4
(Hungary) MTK	1	1	2
(Switzerland) Young Boys	2	4	6
(Sweden) IFK Göteborg	2	0	2
(East Germany) Wismut Karl-Marx-Stadt	2	4	6
(Portugal) Sporting CP	2	0	2
(Belgium) Standard Liège	3	3	6
(France) Reims	4	3	7
(Finland) Helsingin Palloseura	0	0	0

Quarter-finals
(Austria) Wiener Sport-Club	0	1	1
(Spain) Real Madrid	0	7	7
(Spain) Atlético Madrid	3	1	4
(West Germany) Schalke 04	0	1	1
(Switzerland) Young Boys	2	0	2 (2)
(East Germany) Wismut Karl-Marx-Stadt	2	0	2 (1)
(Belgium) Standard Liège	2	0	2
(France) Reims	0	3	3

Semi-finals
(Spain) Real Madrid	2	0	2 (2)
(Spain) Atlético Madrid	1	1	2 (1)
(Switzerland) Young Boys	1	0	1
(France) Reims	0	3	3

Final
(Spain) Real Madrid	2
(France) Reims	0

== First round ==
Team 1	Agg.	Team 2	1st leg	2nd leg	Play-off
Sporting CP (Portugal)	2–6	(Belgium) Standard Liège	2–3	0–3	
Wiener Sport-Club (Austria)	3–2	(Czechoslovakia) Dukla Prague	3–1	0–1	
MTK (Hungary)	2–6	(Switzerland) Young Boys	1–2	1–4	
Atlético Madrid (Spain)	2–2	(Bulgaria) CDNA Sofia	2–1	0–1	3–1 (a.e.t.)
IFK Göteborg (Sweden)	2–6	(East Germany) Wismut Karl-Marx-Stadt	2–2	0–4	
Wolverhampton Wanderers (England)	3–4	(West Germany) Schalke 04	2–2	1–2	
Real Madrid (Spain)	3–1	(Turkey) Beşiktaş	2–0	1–1	
Reims (France)	7–0	(Finland) Helsingin Palloseura	4–0	3–0	

=== First leg ===
29 October 1958
21:00 CET

Sporting CP (Portugal)	2–3	(Belgium) Standard Liège
Bolzée 23' (o.g.); Mendes 80'	Report	Paeschen 10'; Jadot 69'; Mallants 70'

Estádio José Alvalade, Lisbon
Attendance: 35,000
Referee: Joseph Barberan (France)

5 November 1958
19:00 CET

Wiener Sport-Club (Austria)	3–1	(Czechoslovakia) Dukla Prague
Hof 22'; Hamerl 47'; Knoll 57'	Report	Pluskal 83'

Praterstadion, Vienna
Attendance: 50,000
Referee: Kevin Howley (England)

5 November 1958
20:00 CET

MTK (Hungary)	1–2	(Switzerland) Young Boys
Molnár 66'	Report	Wechselberger 64'; Zahnd 80'

Népstadion, Budapest
Attendance: 20,000
Referee: Alfred Grill (Austria)

5 November 1958
20:15 CET

Atlético Madrid (Spain)	2–1	(Bulgaria) CDNA Sofia
Vavá 60'; Peiró 79'	Report	Dimitrov 77'

Santiago Bernabéu, Madrid
Attendance: 80,000
Referee: Paul Wyssling (Switzerland)

9 November 1958
20:00 CET

IFK Göteborg (Sweden)	2–2	(East Germany) Wismut Karl-Marx-Stadt
Ohlsson 5'; Andersson 31'	Report	Seifert 61'; Zink 67'

Nya Ullevi, Gothenburg
Attendance: 13,978
Referee: Józef Kowal (Poland)

12 November 1958
21:00 CET

Wolverhampton Wanderers (England)	2–2	(West Germany) Schalke 04
Broadbent 52', 65'	Report	Siebert 25'; Koslowski 88'

Molineux, Wolverhampton
Attendance: 45,676
Referee: Albert Alsteen (Belgium)

13 November 1958
20:30 CET

Real Madrid (Spain)	2–0	(Turkey) Beşiktaş
Santisteban 57'; Kopa 90'	Report

Santiago Bernabéu, Madrid
Attendance: 60,000
Referee: Pietro Bonetto (Italy)

26 November 1958
20:00 CET

Reims (France)	4–0	(Finland) Helsingin Palloseura
Vincent 22', 35', 85'; Siatka 89'	Report

Stade Auguste-Delaune, Reims
Attendance: 11,452
Referee: Edgar Ommerborn (West Germany)

=== Second leg ===
12 November 1958
20:00 CET

Standard Liège (Belgium)	3–0	(Portugal) Sporting CP
Paeschen 47'; Houf 67'; Mallants 74'	Report

Stade de Sclessin, Liège
Attendance: 32,000
Referee: Michel Devillers (France)

Standard Liège won 6–2 on aggregate.

15 November 1958
20:00 CET

Wismut Karl-Marx-Stadt (East Germany)	4–0	(Sweden) IFK Göteborg
Zink 23', 82'; Kaiser 50', 62'	Report

Otto-Grotewohl-Stadion, Aue
Attendance: 25,000
Referee: Marian Koczner (Poland)

Wismut Karl-Marx-Stadt won 6–2 on aggregate.

18 November 1958
20:00 CET

Schalke 04 (West Germany)	2–1	(England) Wolverhampton Wanderers
Kördell 12'; Siebert 35'	Report	Jackson 48'

Glückauf-Kampfbahn, Gelsenkirchen
Attendance: 43,000
Referee: Gérard Versyp (Belgium)

Schalke 04 won 4–3 on aggregate.

26 November 1958
13:45 CET

Dukla Prague (Czechoslovakia)	1–0	(Austria) Wiener Sport-Club
Masopust 60'	Report

Stadion Letná, Prague
Attendance: 18,000
Referee: Aage Poulsen (Denmark)

Wiener Sport-Club won 3–2 on aggregate.

26 November 1958
18:30 CET

CDNA Sofia (Bulgaria)	1–0	(Spain) Atlético Madrid
Panayotov 64'	Report

Vasil Levski National Stadium, Sofia
Attendance: 50,000
Referee: Paul Wyssling (Switzerland)

Atlético Madrid 2–2 CDNA Sofia on aggregate; play-off needed.

26 November 1958
20:00 CET

Young Boys (Switzerland)	4–1	(Hungary) MTK
Wechselberger 13', 60'; Meier 40'; Allemann 81'	Report	Molnár 85'

Wankdorf Stadium, Bern
Attendance: 28,000
Referee: Alfred Grill (Austria)

Young Boys won 6–2 on aggregate.

27 November 1958
13:00 CET

Beşiktaş (Turkey)	1–1	(Spain) Real Madrid
Köstepen 64'	Report	Santisteban 13'

Mithatpaşa Stadyumu, Istanbul
Attendance: 30,000
Referee: Cesare Jonni (Italy)

Real Madrid won 3–1 on aggregate.

3 December 1958
20:00 CET

Helsingin Palloseura (Finland)	0–3	(France) Reims
	Report	Fontaine 2', 10'; Lintamo 12' (o.g.)

Stade Robert Diochon, Rouen
Attendance: 14,855
Referee: Helmut Fritz (West Germany)

Reims won 7–0 on aggregate.

=== Play-off ===
18 December 1958
20:30 CET

Atlético Madrid (Spain)	3–1 (a.e.t.)	(Bulgaria) CDNA Sofia
Vavá 42', 108' (pen.); Callejo 99'	Report	Yanev 17'

Stade des Charmilles, Geneva
Attendance: 30,000
Referee: Daniel Mellet (Switzerland)

Atlético Madrid won play-off 3–1.

== Quarter-finals ==
Team 1	Agg.	Team 2	1st leg	2nd leg	Play-off
Standard Liège (Belgium)	2–3	(France) Reims	2–0	0–3	
Atlético Madrid (Spain)	4–1	(West Germany) Schalke 04	3–0	1–1	
Wiener Sport-Club (Austria)	1–7	(Spain) Real Madrid	0–0	1–7	
Young Boys (Switzerland)	2–2	(East Germany) Wismut Karl-Marx-Stadt	2–2	0–0	2–1

=== First leg ===
4 February 1959
20:00 CET

Standard Liège (Belgium)	2–0	(France) Reims
Jadot 65'; Givard 71' (pen.)	Report

Stade de Sclessin, Liège
Attendance: 36,000
Referee: John Kelly (England)

4 March 1959
19:30 CET

Wiener Sport-Club (Austria)	0–0	(Spain) Real Madrid
	Report

Praterstadion, Vienna
Attendance: 80,000
Referee: Albert Alsteen (Belgium)

4 March 1959
20:15 CET

Atlético Madrid (Spain)	3–0	(West Germany) Schalke 04
Vavá 47'; Miguel 73'; Peiró 90'	Report

Santiago Bernabéu, Madrid
Attendance: 110,000
Referee: Antonio Moriconi (Italy)

11 March 1959
20:00 CET

Young Boys (Switzerland)	2–2	(East Germany) Wismut Karl-Marx-Stadt
Meier 22'; Rey 87'	Report	Wagner 45'; Zink 59'

Wankdorf Stadium, Bern
Attendance: 32,000
Referee: Francisco Guerra (Portugal)

=== Second leg ===
18 March 1959
19:30 CET

Schalke 04 (West Germany)	1–1	(Spain) Atlético Madrid
Nowak 1'	Report	Vavá 90'

Glückauf-Kampfbahn, Gelsenkirchen
Attendance: 43,000
Referee: Leo Horn (Netherlands)

Atlético Madrid won 4–1 on aggregate.

18 March 1959
20:00 CET

Wismut Karl-Marx-Stadt (East Germany)	0–0	(Switzerland) Young Boys
	Report

Otto-Grotewohl-Stadion, Aue
Attendance: 30,000
Referee: Bengt Andrén (Sweden)

Young Boys 2–2 Wismut Karl-Marx-Stadt on aggregate; play-off needed.

18 March 1959
20:00 CET

Reims (France)	3–0	(Belgium) Standard Liège
Piantoni 70'; Fontaine 73', 88'	Report

Stade Auguste-Delaune, Reims
Attendance: 32,235
Referee: José María Ortiz de Mendíbil (Spain)

Reims won 3–2 on aggregate.

18 March 1959
20:30 CET

Real Madrid (Spain)	7–1	(Austria) Wiener Sport-Club
Mateos 8'; Di Stéfano 14', 64', 69', 75'; Rial 67'; Gento 89'	Report	Horak 9'

Santiago Bernabéu, Madrid
Attendance: 90,000
Referee: Maurice Guigue (France)

Real Madrid won 7–1 on aggregate.

=== Play-off ===
1 April 1959
20:00 CET

Young Boys (Switzerland)	2–1	(East Germany) Wismut Karl-Marx-Stadt
Meier 21'; Wechselberger 33'	Report	Tröger 75' (pen.)

Olympic Stadium, Amsterdam
Attendance: 20,000
Referee: Leo Horn (Netherlands)

Young Boys won play-off 2–1.

== Semi-finals ==
Team 1	Agg.	Team 2	1st leg	2nd leg	Play-off
Young Boys (Switzerland)	1–3	(France) Reims	1–0	0–3	
Real Madrid (Spain)	2–2	(Spain) Atlético Madrid	2–1	0–1	2–1

=== First leg ===
15 April 1959
20:00 CET

Young Boys (Switzerland)	1–0	(France) Reims
Meier 15'	Report

Wankdorf Stadium, Bern
Attendance: 60,000
Referee: Lucien Van Nuffel (Belgium)

15 April 1959
20:30 CET

Real Madrid (Spain)	2–1	(Spain) Atlético Madrid
Rial 15'; Puskás 33' (pen.)	Report	Chuzo 13'

Santiago Bernabéu, Madrid
Attendance: 120,000
Referee: Jack Mowat (Scotland)

=== Second leg ===
7 May 1959
17:00 CET

Atlético Madrid (Spain)	1–0	(Spain) Real Madrid
Collar 43'	Report

Estadio Metropolitano de Madrid, Madrid
Attendance: 50,000
Referee: Reg Leafe (England)

Real Madrid 2–2 Atlético Madrid on aggregate; play-off needed.

13 May 1959
20:00 CET

Reims (France)	3–0	(Switzerland) Young Boys
Piantoni 41', 72'; Penverne 47'	Report

Parc des Princes, Paris
Attendance: 35,898
Referee: Pieter Paulus Roomer (Netherlands)

Reims won 3–1 on aggregate.

=== Play-off ===
13 May 1959
17:00 CET

Real Madrid (Spain)	2–1	(Spain) Atlético Madrid
Di Stéfano 16'; Puskás 42'	Report	Collar 18'

La Romareda, Zaragoza
Attendance: 20,000
Referee: Arthur Edward Ellis (England)

Real Madrid won play-off 2–1.

== Final ==
The 1959 European Cup final was played on 3 June 1959 at the Neckarstadion in Stuttgart, West Germany. Real Madrid's victory was their fourth consecutive title, maintaining their status as the only team to have won the competition. Reims were runners-up for a second time, having already lost to Real in the inaugural final in 1956.

3 June 1959
20:00 CET

Real Madrid (Spain)	2–0	(France) Reims
Mateos 1'; Di Stéfano 47'	Report

Neckarstadion, Stuttgart
Attendance: 72,000
Referee: Albert Dusch (West Germany)

== Top goalscorers ==
The top scorers from the 1958–59 European Cup (including preliminary round) were as follows:

Rank	Player	Team	Goals
1	(France) Just Fontaine	(France) Reims	10
2	(Brazil) Vavá	(Spain) Atlético Madrid	8
3	(Spain) Alfredo Di Stéfano	(Spain) Real Madrid	6
3	(Spain) Joaquín Peiró	(Spain) Atlético Madrid	6
5	(Spain) Enrique Collar	(Spain) Atlético Madrid	5
5	(Austria) Josef Hamerl	(Austria) Wiener Sport-Club	5
5	(France) Roger Piantoni	(France) Reims	5
5	(East Germany) Klaus Zink	(East Germany) Wismut Karl-Marx-Stadt	5
9	(Brazil) Ivson	(Portugal) Sporting CP	4
9	(Belgium) Jean Jadot	(Belgium) Standard Liège	4
9	(West Germany) Bernhard Klodt	(West Germany) Schalke 04	4
9	(Switzerland) Eugen Meier	(Switzerland) Young Boys	4
9	(Hungary) Péter Palotás	(Hungary) MTK	4
9	(East Germany) Willy Tröger	(East Germany) Wismut Karl-Marx-Stadt	4
9	(Switzerland) Ernst Wechselberger	(Switzerland) Young Boys	4
