= BSC Young Boys in European football =

Football club in Switzerland

BSC Young Boys is a Swiss football club, based in Bern. They first competed in a UEFA competition in 1957, qualifying for the European Cup after winning the 1956–57 Swiss League. The furthest they have progressed in a UEFA tournament is the semi-finals of the 1958–59 European Cup, where they were beaten by Reims.

== European results & record ==
=== By competition ===
Competition	Pld	W	D	L	GF	GA
UEFA Champions League	62	19	17	26	81	120
UEFA Cup / UEFA Europa League	87	36	20	31	133	117
UEFA Europa Conference League	6	5	0	1	10	1
UEFA Cup Winners' Cup	10	2	2	6	10	18
UEFA Intertoto Cup	115	39	53	65	187	266
Total	274	101	69	126	417	511

Source: UEFA.com, Last updated on 23 November 2021.

Pld = Matches played; W = Matches won; D = Matches drawn; L = Matches lost; GF = Goals for; GA = Goals against. Defunct competitions indicated in italics.

=== Matches ===
Season	Competition	Round	Opponent	Home	Away	Aggregate
1957–58	European Cup	R1	(Hungary) Vasas Budapest	1–1	1–2	2–3
1958–59	European Cup	R1	(Hungary) MTK Budapest	4–1	2–1	6–2
1958–59	European Cup	QF	(East Germany) Wismut Karl-Marx-Stadt	2–2	0–0	2–2 (po 2–1)
1958–59	European Cup	SF	(France) Reims	1–0	0–3	1–3
1959–60	European Cup	R1	(Germany) Eintracht Frankfurt	1–4	1–1	2–5
1960–61	European Cup	Q	(Republic of Ireland) Limerick	4–2	5–0	9–2
1960–61	European Cup	R1	(Germany) Hamburger SV	0–5	3–3	3–8
1975–76	UEFA Cup	R1	(Germany) Hamburger SV	0–0	2–4	2–4
1977–78	UEFA Cup Winners' Cup	Q	(Scotland) Rangers	2–2	0–1	2–3
1979–80	UEFA Cup Winners' Cup	R1	(Romania) Steaua București	2–2	0–6	2–8
1986–87	European Cup	R1	(Spain) Real Madrid	1–0	0–5	1–5
1987–88	UEFA Cup Winners' Cup	R1	(Czech Republic) DAC Dunajská Streda	3–1	1–2	4–3
1987–88	UEFA Cup Winners' Cup	R2	(Netherlands) FC Den Haag	1–0	1–2	2–2 (a)
1987–88	UEFA Cup Winners' Cup	QF	(Netherlands) Ajax	0–1	0–1	0–2
1993–94	UEFA Cup	R1	(Scotland) Celtic	0–0	0–1 (a.e.t.)	0–1
2003–04	UEFA Cup	Q1	(Finland) MyPa-47	2–2	2–3	4–5
2004–05	UEFA Champions League	Q2	(Serbia and Montenegro) Red Star Belgrade	2–2	0–3	2–5
2005	UEFA Intertoto Cup	R2	(Belgium) Lokeren	2–1	4–1	6–2
2005	UEFA Intertoto Cup	R3	(France) Marseille	2–3	1–2	3–5
2006–07	UEFA Cup	Q1	(Armenia) Mika Ashtarak	1–0	3–1	4–1
2006–07	UEFA Cup	Q2	(France) Marseille	3–3	0–0	3–3 (a)
2007–08	UEFA Cup	Q1	(Armenia) Banants	4–0	1–1	5–1
2007–08	UEFA Cup	Q2	(France) Lens	1–1	1–5	2–6
2008–09	UEFA Cup	Q2	(Hungary) Debrecen	4–1	3–2	7–3
2008–09	UEFA Cup	R1	(Belgium) Club Brugge	2–2	0–2	2–4
2009–10	UEFA Europa League	Q3	(Spain) Athletic Bilbao	1–2	1–0	2–2 (a)
2010–11	UEFA Champions League	Q3	(Turkey) Fenerbahçe	2–2	1–0	3–2
2010–11	UEFA Champions League	PO	(England) Tottenham Hotspur	3–2	0–4	3–6
2010–11	UEFA Europa League	Group H	(Germany) VfB Stuttgart	4–2	0–3	2nd
2010–11	UEFA Europa League	Group H	(Spain) Getafe	2–0	0–1	2nd
2010–11	UEFA Europa League	Group H	(Denmark) Odense Boldklub	4–2	0–2	2nd
2010–11	UEFA Europa League	R32	(Russia) Zenit Saint Petersburg	2–1	1–3	3–4
2011–12	UEFA Europa League	Q3	(Belgium) Westerlo	3–1	2–0	5–1
2011–12	UEFA Europa League	PO	(Portugal) Braga	2–2	0–0	2–2 (a)
2012–13	UEFA Europa League	Q2	(Moldova) Zimbru Chișinău	1–0	0–1 (a.e.t.)	1–1 (4–1 p)
2012–13	UEFA Europa League	Q3	(Sweden) Kalmar FF	3–0	0–1	3–1
2012–13	UEFA Europa League	PO	(Denmark) FC Midtjylland	0–2	3–0	3–2
2012–13	UEFA Europa League	Group A	(Russia) Anzhi Makhachkala	3–1	0–2	3rd
2012–13	UEFA Europa League	Group A	(England) Liverpool	3–5	2–2	3rd
2012–13	UEFA Europa League	Group A	(Italy) Udinese	3–1	3–2	3rd
2014–15	UEFA Europa League	Q3	(Cyprus) Ermis Aradippou	1–0	2–0	3–0
2014–15	UEFA Europa League	PO	(Hungary) Debrecen	3–1	0–0	3–1
2014–15	UEFA Europa League	Group I	(Slovakia) Slovan Bratislava	5–0	3–1	2nd
2014–15	UEFA Europa League	Group I	(Czech Republic) Sparta Prague	2–0	1–3	2nd
2014–15	UEFA Europa League	Group I	(Italy) Napoli	2–0	0–3	2nd
2014–15	UEFA Europa League	R32	(England) Everton	1–4	1–3	2–7
2015–16	UEFA Champions League	Q3	(France) Monaco	1–3	0–4	1–7
2015–16	UEFA Europa League	PO	(Azerbaijan) Qarabağ	0–1	0–3	0–4
2016–17	UEFA Champions League	Q3	(Ukraine) Shakhtar Donetsk	2–0 (a.e.t.)	0–2	2–2 (4–2 p)
2016–17	UEFA Champions League	PO	(Germany) Borussia Mönchengladbach	1–3	1–6	2–9
2016–17	UEFA Europa League	Group B	(Greece) Olympiacos	0–1	1–1	3rd
2016–17	UEFA Europa League	Group B	(Kazakhstan) Astana	3–0	0–0	3rd
2016–17	UEFA Europa League	Group B	(Cyprus) APOEL	3–1	0–1	3rd
2017–18	UEFA Champions League	Q3	(Ukraine) Dynamo Kyiv	2–0	1–3	3–3 (a)
2017–18	UEFA Champions League	PO	(Russia) CSKA Moscow	0–1	0–2	0–3
2017–18	UEFA Europa League	Group B	(Ukraine) Dynamo Kyiv	0–1	2–2	3rd
2017–18	UEFA Europa League	Group B	(Serbia) Partizan	1–1	1–2	3rd
2017–18	UEFA Europa League	Group B	(Albania) Skënderbeu	2–1	1–1	3rd
2018–19	UEFA Champions League	PO	(Croatia) Dinamo Zagreb	1–1	2–1	3–2
2018–19	UEFA Champions League	Group H	(Italy) Juventus	2–1	0–3	4th
2018–19	UEFA Champions League	Group H	(Spain) Valencia	1–1	1–3	4th
2018–19	UEFA Champions League	Group H	(England) Manchester United	0–3	0–1	4th
2019–20	UEFA Champions League	PO	(Serbia) Red Star Belgrade	2–2	1–1	3–3 (a)
2019–20	UEFA Europa League	Group G	(Portugal) Porto	1–2	1–2	3rd
2019–20	UEFA Europa League	Group G	(Netherlands) Feyenoord	2–0	1–1	3rd
2019–20	UEFA Europa League	Group G	(Scotland) Rangers	2–1	1–1	3rd
2020–21	UEFA Champions League	Q2	(Faroe Islands) KÍ	3–1	—N/a	—N/a
2020–21	UEFA Champions League	Q3	(Denmark) Midtjylland	—N/a	0–3	—N/a
2020–21	UEFA Europa League	PO	(Albania) Tirana	3–0	—N/a	—N/a
2020–21	UEFA Europa League	Group A	(Italy) Roma	1–2	1–3	2nd
2020–21	UEFA Europa League	Group A	(Romania) CFR Cluj	2–1	1–1	2nd
2020–21	UEFA Europa League	Group A	(Bulgaria) CSKA Sofia	3–0	1–0	2nd
2020–21	UEFA Europa League	R32	(Germany) Bayer Leverkusen	4–3	2–0	6–3
2020–21	UEFA Europa League	R16	(Netherlands) Ajax	0–2	0–3	0–5
2021–22	UEFA Champions League	Q2	(Slovakia) Slovan Bratislava	3–2	0–0	3–2
2021–22	UEFA Champions League	Q3	(Romania) CFR Cluj	3–1	1–1	4–2
2021–22	UEFA Champions League	PO	(Hungary) Ferencváros	3–2	3–2	6–4
2021–22	UEFA Champions League	Group F	(Spain) Villarreal	1–4	0–2	4th
2021–22	UEFA Champions League	Group F	(England) Manchester United	2–1	1–1	4th
2021–22	UEFA Champions League	Group F	(Italy) Atalanta	3–3	0–1	4th
2022–23	UEFA Europa Conference League	Q2	(Latvia) Liepāja	3–0	1–0	4–0
2022–23	UEFA Europa Conference League	Q3	(Finland) KuPS	3–0	2–0	5–0
2022–23	UEFA Europa Conference League	PO	(Belgium) Anderlecht	0–1	1–0 (a.e.t.)	1–1 (1–3 p)
2023–24	UEFA Champions League	PO	(Israel) Maccabi Haifa	3–0	0–0	3–0
2023–24	UEFA Champions League	Group G	(Germany) RB Leipzig	1–3	1–2	3rd
2023–24	UEFA Champions League	Group G	(Serbia) Red Star Belgrade	2–0	2–2	3rd
2023–24	UEFA Champions League	Group G	(England) Manchester City	1–3	0–3	3rd
2023–24	UEFA Europa League	KRPO	(Portugal) Sporting CP	1–3	1–1	2–4
2024–25	UEFA Champions League	PO	(Turkey) Galatasaray	3–2	1–0	4–2
2024–25	UEFA Champions League	League Phase	(England) Aston Villa	0–3	—N/a	36th
2024–25	UEFA Champions League	League Phase	(Spain) Barcelona	—N/a	0–5	36th
2024–25	UEFA Champions League	League Phase	(Italy) Inter Milan	0–1	—N/a	36th
2024–25	UEFA Champions League	League Phase	(Ukraine) Shakhtar Donetsk	—N/a	1–2	36th
2024–25	UEFA Champions League	League Phase	(Italy) Atalanta	1–6	—N/a	36th
2024–25	UEFA Champions League	League Phase	(Germany) VfB Stuttgart	—N/a	1–5	36th
2024–25	UEFA Champions League	League Phase	(Scotland) Celtic	—N/a	0–1	36th
2024–25	UEFA Champions League	League Phase	(Serbia) Red Star Belgrade	0–1	—N/a	36th
2025–26	UEFA Europa League	PO	(Slovakia) Slovan Bratislava	3–2	1–0	4–2
2025–26	UEFA Europa League	League Phase	(Greece) Panathinaikos	1–4	—N/a	25th
2025–26	UEFA Europa League	League Phase	(Romania) FCSB	—N/a	2–0	25th
2025–26	UEFA Europa League	League Phase	(Bulgaria) Ludogorets Razgrad	3–2	—N/a	25th
2025–26	UEFA Europa League	League Phase	(Greece) PAOK	—N/a	0–4	25th
2025–26	UEFA Europa League	League Phase	(England) Aston Villa	—N/a	1–2	25th
2025–26	UEFA Europa League	League Phase	(France) Lille	1–0	—N/a	25th
2025–26	UEFA Europa League	League Phase	(France) Lyon	0–1	—N/a	25th
2025–26	UEFA Europa League	League Phase	(Germany) VfB Stuttgart	—N/a	2–3	25th
