= Standard Liège in European football =

Standard Liège's first game in European football came in the 1958–59 season in the European Cup against Scottish club Heart of Midlothian. Over two legs, Liège won 6–3 on aggregate. Since that time, Liège have participated in multiple European competitions. Their best success came in the 1981–82 season when they reached the final of UEFA Cup Winners' Cup to face off against Barcelona with the ending result of 2–1 loss. In 1996, they took part in the UEFA Intertoto Cup where they reached the finals to face off against Karlsruher SC of Germany. Over two legs, Liège won the first game at home 1–0. In the second game away, they lost 3–1 which was a 3–2 loss on aggregate.

== European record ==
=== Matches ===
| Season | Competition | Round | Opponent | Home | Away | Agg. | Ref |
|---|---|---|---|---|---|---|---|
| 1958–59 | European Cup | Q | (Scotland) Heart of Midlothian | 5–1 | 1–2 | 6–3 | |
| 1958–59 | European Cup | R1 | (Portugal) Sporting CP | 3–2 | 3–0 | 6–2 | |
| 1958–59 | European Cup | QF | (France) Reims | 2–0 | 0–3 | 2–3 | |
| 1961–62 | European Cup | Q | (Norway) Fredrikstad FK | 2–1 | 2–0 | 4–1 | |
| 1961–62 | European Cup | R1 | (Finland) FC Haka Valkeakoski | 5–1 | 2–0 | 7–1 | |
| 1961–62 | European Cup | QF | (Scotland) Rangers | 4–1 | 0–2 | 4–3 | |
| 1961–62 | European Cup | SF | (Spain) Real Madrid | 0–4 | 0–2 | 0–6 | |
| 1963–64 | European Cup | Q | (Sweden) IFK Norrköping | 1–0 | 0–2 | 1–2 | |
| 1965–66 | Cup Winners' Cup | R1 | (Wales) Cardiff City | 2–1 | 1–0 | 3–1 | |
| 1965–66 | Cup Winners' Cup | R2 | (England) Liverpool | 1–3 | 1–2 | 2–5 | |
| 1966–67 | UEFA Cup Winners' Cup | Q | (Iceland) Valur | 1–1 | 8–1 | 9–2 | |
| 1966–67 | UEFA Cup Winners' Cup | R1 | (Cyprus) Apollon Limassol | 5–1 | 1–0 | 6–1 | |
| 1966–67 | UEFA Cup Winners' Cup | R2 | (East Germany) Chemie Leipzig | 1–2 | 1–0 | 2–2 | |
| 1966–67 | UEFA Cup Winners' Cup | QF | (Hungary) Raba ETO Győr | 1–2 | 2–0 | 2–2 | |
| 1966–67 | UEFA Cup Winners' Cup | SF | (West Germany) Bayern Munich | 0–2 | 1–3 | 1–5 | |
| 1967–68 | UEFA Cup Winners' Cup | R1 | (Turkey) Altay Izmir | 3–2 | 0–0 | 3–2 | |
| 1967–68 | UEFA Cup Winners' Cup | R2 | (Scotland) Aberdeen | 3–0 | 0–2 | 3–2 | |
| 1967–68 | UEFA Cup Winners' Cup | QF | (Italy) Milan | 1–1 | 1–1 (Note: After drawing 2–2 over two legs, Standard Liège had to play an additional game against Milan away which they lost 2–0.) | 2–2 | |
| 1968–69 | Inter-Cities Fairs Cup | R1 | (England) Leeds United | 0–0 | 2–3 | 2–3 | |
| 1969–70 | European Cup | R1 | (Albania) 17 Nëntori Tirana | 3–0 | 1–1 | 4–1 | |
| 1969–70 | European Cup | R2 | (Spain) Real Madrid | 1–0 | 3–2 | 4–2 | |
| 1969–70 | European Cup | QF | (England) Leeds United | 0–1 | 0–1 | 0–2 | |
| 1970–71 | European Cup | R1 | (Norway) Rosenborg | 2–0 | 5–0 | 7–0 | |
| 1970–71 | European Cup | R2 | (Poland) Legia Warsaw | 1–0 | 0–2 | 1–2 | |
| 1971–72 | European Cup | R1 | (Northern Ireland) Linfield | 2–0 | 3–2 | 5–2 | |
| 1971–72 | European Cup | R2 | (Soviet Union) CSKA Moscow | 0–1 | 2–0 | 2–1 | |
| 1971–72 | European Cup | QF | (Italy) Internazionale | 0–1 | 2–1 | 2–2 (Note: Internazionale won on away goals rules.) | |
| 1972–73 | UEFA Cup Winners' Cup | R1 | (Czech Republic) Sparta Prague | 1–0 | 2–4 | 3–4 | |
| 1973–74 | UEFA Cup | R1 | (Northern Ireland) Ards | 2–3 | 6–1 | 8–4 | |
| 1973–74 | UEFA Cup | R2 | (Romania) Universitatea Craiova | 2–0 | 1–1 | 3–1 | |
| 1973–74 | UEFA Cup | R3 | (Netherlands) Feyenoord | 1–3 | 2–0 | 3–3 (Note: Feyenoord won on away goals rules.) | |
| 1977–78 | UEFA Cup | R1 | (Czech Republic) Slavia Prague | 1–0 | 2–3 | 3–3 (Note: Standard Liège won on away goals rules.) | |
| 1977–78 | UEFA Cup | R2 | (Greece) AEK Athens | 2–2 | 4–1 | 6–3 | |
| 1977–78 | UEFA Cup | R3 | (East Germany) Carl Zeiss Jena | 0–2 | 1–2 | 1–4 | |
| 1978–79 | UEFA Cup | R1 | (Scotland) Dundee United | 1–0 | 0–0 | 1–0 | |
| 1978–79 | UEFA Cup | R2 | (England) Manchester City | 0–4 | 2–0 | 2–4 | |
| 1979–80 | UEFA Cup | R1 | (Northern Ireland) Glenavon | 1–0 | 1–0 | 2–0 | |
| 1979–80 | UEFA Cup | R2 | (Italy) Napoli | 2–1 | 1–1 | 3–2 | |
| 1979–80 | UEFA Cup | R3 | (Czech Republic) Zbrojovska Brno | 1–2 | 2–3 | 3–5 | |
| 1980–81 | UEFA Cup | R1 | (Romania) Steaua Bucharest | 1–1 | 2–1 | 3–2 | |
| 1980–81 | UEFA Cup | R2 | (West Germany) 1. FC Kaiserslautern | 2–1 | 2–1 | 4–2 | |
| 1980–81 | UEFA Cup | R3 | (East Germany) Dynamo Dresden | 1–1 | 4–1 | 5–2 | |
| 1980–81 | UEFA Cup | QF | (West Germany) 1. FC Köln | 0–0 | 2–3 | 2–3 | |
| 1981–82 | UEFA Cup Winners' Cup | R1 | (Malta) Floriana | 3–1 | 9–0 | 12–1 | |
| 1981–82 | UEFA Cup Winners' Cup | R2 | (Hungary) Vasas Budapest | 2–0 | 2–1 | 4–1 | |
| 1981–82 | UEFA Cup Winners' Cup | QF | (Portugal) Porto | 2–0 | 2–2 | 4–2 | |
| 1981–82 | UEFA Cup Winners' Cup | SF | (Soviet Union) Dinamo Tbilisi | 1–0 | 1–0 | 2–0 | |
| 1981–82 | UEFA Cup Winners' Cup | F | (Spain) Barcelona | 1–2 | | | |
| 1982–83 | European Cup | R1 | (Hungary) Raba ETO Győr | 5–0 | 0–3 | 5–3 | |
| 1982–83 | European Cup | R2 | (Italy) Juventus | 1–1 | 0–2 | 1–3 | |
| 1983–84 | European Cup | R1 | (Republic of Ireland) Athlone Town | 3–2 | 8–2 | 11–4 | |
| 1983–84 | European Cup | R2 | (Scotland) Dundee United | 0–0 | 0–4 | 0–4 | |
| 1984–85 | UEFA Cup | R1 | (Northern Ireland) Glentoran | 1–1 | 2–0 | 3–1 | |
| 1984–85 | UEFA Cup | R2 | (West Germany) 1. FC Köln | 0–2 | 1–2 | 1–4 | |
| 1986–87 | UEFA Cup | R1 | (Socialist Federal Republic of Yugoslavia) NK Rijeka | 1–0 | 1–1 | 1–1 | |
| 1986–87 | UEFA Cup | R2 | (Austria) FC Swarovski Tirol | 1–2 | 3–2 | 4–4 (Note: FC Swarovski Tirol won on away goals rules.) | |
| 1992–93 | UEFA Cup | R1 | (Northern Ireland) Portadown | 5–0 | 0–0 | 5–0 | |
| 1992–93 | UEFA Cup | R2 | (Scotland) Heart of Midlothian | 1–0 | 1–0 | 2–0 | |
| 1992–93 | UEFA Cup | R3 | (France) Auxerre | 2–2 | 1–2 | 3–4 | |
| 1993–94 | UEFA Cup Winners' Cup | R1 | (Wales) Cardiff City | 5–2 | 3–1 | 8–3 | |
| 1993–94 | UEFA Cup Winners' Cup | R2 | (England) Arsenal | 0–3 | 0–7 | 0–10 | |
| 1995–96 | UEFA Cup | R1 | (Portugal) Vitória SC | 1–3 | 0–0 | 1–3 | |
| 1996 | UEFA Intertoto Cup | Group | (Northern Ireland) Cliftonville | 3–0 | | | |
| 1996 | UEFA Intertoto Cup | Group | (Israel) Hapoel Haifa | 2–2 | | | |
| 1996 | UEFA Intertoto Cup | Group | (Germany) VfB Stuttgart | 2–0 | | | |
| 1996 | UEFA Intertoto Cup | Group | (Denmark) Aalborg BK | 1–0 | | | |
| 1996 | UEFA Intertoto Cup | SF | (France) Nantes | 2–1 | 1–0 | 3–1 | |
| 1996 | UEFA Intertoto Cup | F | (Germany) Karlsruher SC | 1–0 | 1–3 | 2–3 | |
| 1997 | UEFA Intertoto Cup | Group | (Switzerland) FC Aarau | 0–0 | | | |
| 1997 | UEFA Intertoto Cup | Group | (Republic of Ireland) Cork City | 0–0 | | | |
| 1997 | UEFA Intertoto Cup | Group | (Israel) Maccabi Petah Tikva | 0–0 | | | |
| 1997 | UEFA Intertoto Cup | Group | (Germany) 1. FC Köln | 1–1 | | | |
| 2000 | UEFA Intertoto Cup | R1 | (Georgia (country)) Dinamo Tbilisi | 2–2 | 1–1 | 3–3 | |
| 2000 | UEFA Intertoto Cup | R2 | (Italy) Perugia | 2–1 | 1–1 | 3–2 | |
| 2000 | UEFA Intertoto Cup | R3 | Austria Salzburg | 3–1 | 1–1 | 4–2 | |
| 2000 | UEFA Intertoto Cup | SF | (Germany) VfB Stuttgart | 1–1 | 0–1 | 1–1 | |
| 2001–02 | UEFA Cup | Q | (North Macedonia) FK Vardar | 3–0 | 3–1 | 6–1 | |
| 2001–02 | UEFA Cup | R1 | (France) Strasbourg | 2–0 | 2–2 | 4–2 | |
| 2001–02 | UEFA Cup | R2 | (France) Bordeaux | 0–2 | 0–2 | 0–4 | |
| 2004–05 | UEFA Cup | R1 | (Germany) VfL Bochum | 0–0 | 1–1 | 1–1 (a) | |
| 2004–05 | UEFA Cup | Group | (Romania) Steaua Bucharest | 0–2 | | | |
| 2004–05 | UEFA Cup | Group | (Italy) Parma | 2–1 | | | |
| 2004–05 | UEFA Cup | Group | (Turkey) Beşiktaş | 1–1 | | | |
| 2004–05 | UEFA Cup | Group | (Spain) Athletic Bilbao | 1–7 | | | |
| 2006–07 | UEFA Champions League | 3Q | (Romania) Steaua Bucharest | 2–2 | 1–2 | 3–4 | |
| 2006–07 | UEFA Cup | R1 | (Spain) Celta Vigo | 0–1 | 0–3 | 0–4 | |
| 2007–08 | UEFA Cup | Q2 | (Luxembourg) UN Käerjeng 97 | 3–0 | 1–0 | 4–0 | |
| 2007–08 | UEFA Cup | R1 | (Russia) Zenit Saint Petersburg | 0–3 | 1–1 | 1–4 | |
| 2008–09 | UEFA Champions League | Q3 | (England) Liverpool | 0–0 | 0–1 (a.e.t.) | | |
| 2008–09 | UEFA Cup | R1 | (England) Everton | 2–2 | 2–1 | 4–3 | |
| 2008–09 | UEFA Cup | Group | (Spain) Sevilla | 1–0 | | | |
| 2008–09 | UEFA Cup | Group | (Serbia) Partizan | 1–0 | | | |
| 2008–09 | UEFA Cup | Group | (Italy) Sampdoria | 3–0 | | | |
| 2008–09 | UEFA Cup | Group | (Germany) VfB Stuttgart | 0–3 | | | |
| 2008–09 | UEFA Cup | R32 | (Portugal) Braga | 0–3 | 1–1 | 1–4 | |
| 2009–10 | UEFA Champions League | Group | (England) Arsenal | 2–3 | 0–2 | | |
| 2009–10 | UEFA Champions League | Group | (Netherlands) AZ | 1–1 | 1–1 | | |
| 2009–10 | UEFA Champions League | Group | (Greece) Olympiacos | 1–2 | 2–0 | | |
| 2009–10 | UEFA Europa League | R32 | (Austria) Red Bull Salzburg | 3–2 | 0–0 | 3–2 | |
| 2009–10 | UEFA Europa League | R16 | (Greece) Panathinaikos | 3–1 | 1–0 | 4–1 | |
| 2009–10 | UEFA Europa League | QF | (Germany) Hamburger SV | 1–2 | 1–3 | 2–5 | |
| 2011–12 | UEFA Champions League | Q3 | (Switzerland) Zürich | 1–1 | 0–1 | 1–2 | |
| 2011–12 | UEFA Europa League | PO | (Sweden) Helsingborgs IF | 1–0 | 3–1 | 4–1 | |
| 2011–12 | UEFA Europa League | Group | (Denmark) Copenhagen | 3–0 | 1–0 | | |
| 2011–12 | UEFA Europa League | Group | (Germany) Hannover 96 | 0–0 | 2–0 | | |
| 2011–12 | UEFA Europa League | Group | (Ukraine) Vorskla Poltava | 0–0 | 3–1 | | |
| 2011–12 | UEFA Europa League | R32 | (Poland) Wisła Kraków | 1–1 | 0–0 | 1–1 | |
| 2011–12 | UEFA Europa League | R16 | (Germany) Hannover 96 | 2–2 | 0–4 | 2–6 | |
| 2013–14 | UEFA Europa League | QR2 | (Iceland) KR | 3–1 | 3–1 | 6–2 | |
| 2013–14 | UEFA Europa League | QR3 | (Greece) Xanthi | 2–1 | 2–1 | 4–2 | |
| 2013–14 | UEFA Europa League | POR | (Belarus) Minsk | 2–0 | 3–1 | 5–1 | |
| 2013–14 | UEFA Europa League | Group | (Denmark) Esbjerg | 1–2 | 1–2 | | |
| 2013–14 | UEFA Europa League | Group | (Sweden) Elfsborg | 1–3 | 1–1 | | |
| 2013–14 | UEFA Europa League | Group | (Austria) Red Bull Salzburg | 1–3 | 1–2 | | |
| 2014–15 | CL | Q3 | (Greece) Panathinaikos | 0–0 | 1–2 | 1–2 | |
| 2014–15 | CL | POR | (Russia) Zenit SP | 0–1 | 0–3 | 0–4 | |
| 2014–15 | EL | Group | (Croatia) Rijeka | 2–0 | 0–2 | | |
| 2014–15 | EL | Group | (Netherlands) Feyenoord | 0–3 | 1–2 | | |
| 2014–15 | EL | Group | (Spain) Sevilla | 0–0 | 1–3 | | |
| 2015–16 | UEFA Europa League | QR3 | (Bosnia and Herzegovina) Željezničar | 2–1 | 1–0 | 3–1 | |
| 2015–16 | UEFA Europa League | POR | (Norway) Molde | 3–1 | 0–2 | 3–3 (a) | |
| 2016–17 | UEFA Europa League | Group | (Greece) Panathinaikos | 2–2 | 3–0 | | |
| 2016–17 | UEFA Europa League | Group | (Spain) Celta Vigo | 1–1 | 1–1 | | |
| 2016–17 | UEFA Europa League | Group | (Netherlands) Ajax | 1–1 | 0–1 | | |
| 2018–19 | UEFA Champions League | Q3 | (Netherlands) Ajax | 2–2 | 0–3 | 2–5 | |
| 2018–19 | UEFA Europa League | Group | (Spain) Sevilla | 1–0 | 1–5 | | |
| 2018–19 | UEFA Europa League | Group | (Russia) Krasnodar | 2–1 | 1–2 | | |
| 2018–19 | UEFA Europa League | Group | (Turkey) Akhisar Belediyespor | 2–1 | 0–0 | | |
| 2019–20 | UEFA Europa League | Group | (Portugal) Vitória Guimaraes | 2–0 | 1–1 | | |
| 2019–20 | UEFA Europa League | Group | (Germany) Eintracht Frankfurt | 2–1 | 1–2 | | |
| 2019–20 | UEFA Europa League | Group | (England) Arsenal | 2–2 | 0–4 | | |
| 2020–21 | UEFA Europa League | Q2 | (Wales) Bala Town | 2–0 | | | |
| 2020–21 | UEFA Europa League | Q3 | (Serbia) Vojvodina | 2–1 (a.e.t.) | | | |
| 2020–21 | UEFA Europa League | PO | (Hungary) Fehérvár | 3–1 | | | |
| 2020–21 | UEFA Europa League | Group | (Portugal) Benfica | 2–2 | 0–3 | | |
| 2020–21 | UEFA Europa League | Group | (Scotland) Rangers | 0–2 | 2–3 | | |
| 2020–21 | UEFA Europa League | Group | (Poland) Lech Poznań | 2–1 | 1–3 | | |

=== Summary of best results ===
From the quarter-finals upwards:

(2 finals)

European Cup/UEFA Champions League:

- semi-finalists in 1962
- quarter-finalists in 1959, 1970 and 1972

UEFA Cup Winners' Cup (1):

- finalists in 1982
- semi-finalists in 1967
- quarter-finalists in 1968

UEFA Cup/UEFA Europa League:

- quarter-finalists in 1981 and 2010

UEFA Intertoto Cup (1):

- finalists in 1996
- semi-finalists in 2000
