= 1958 German football championship =

1958 German championship
Deutsche Fußballmeisterschaft

Tournament details
- Country: West Germany
- Dates: 19 April – 18 May
- Teams: 9

Final positions
- Champions: Schalke 04; 7th German title
- Runners-up: Hamburger SV
- European Cup: Schalke 04

Tournament statistics
- Matches played: 15
- Goals scored: 68 (4.53 per match)
- Top goal scorer: Bernhard Klodt (5 goals)

The 1958 German football championship was the culmination of the football season in the Federal Republic of Germany in 1957–58. Schalke 04 were crowned champions for a seventh time after a group stage and a final.

It was the club's first title since 1942 and also its last, as of present. It was won in impressive fashion, Schalke winning all its four finals games, scoring 19 goals and conceding only one; a reminder of how the club dominated German football in the 1930s and early 1940s. On the strength of this title, Schalke participated in the 1958–59 European Cup, where it was knocked out in the quarter-finals by Atlético Madrid.

For Hamburg, it was the second lost final in a row, having lost 4–1 in 1957 to Borussia Dortmund and having to wait another two seasons for its first title since 1928.

The format used to determine the German champion was the same as in the 1957 season. Nine clubs qualified for the tournament, with the runners-up of West and Southwest having to play a qualifying match. The remaining eight clubs then played a single round in two groups of four, with the two group winners entering the final.

== Qualified teams ==
The teams qualified through the 1957–58 Oberliga season:

Club	Qualified from
Hamburger SV	Oberliga Nord champions
Eintracht Braunschweig	Oberliga Nord runners-up
Schalke 04	Oberliga West champions
1. FC Köln	Oberliga West runners-up
Tennis Borussia Berlin	Oberliga Berlin champions
FK Pirmasens	Oberliga Südwest champions
1. FC Kaiserslautern	Oberliga Südwest runners-up
Karlsruher SC	Oberliga Süd champions
1. FC Nürnberg	Oberliga Süd runners-up

== Competition ==
=== Qualifying round ===
19 April 1958	1. FC Köln	3 – 3 (a.e.t.)	1. FC Kaiserslautern	Frankfurt
	Schäfer 10'; Pfeiffer 35'; Fendel 48'		O.Walter 31'; Wodarzik 80'; Wenzel 84'	Stadium: Waldstadion; Attendance: 70,000; Referee: Asmussen (Flensburg)

==== Replay ====
20 April 1958	1. FC Köln	3 – 0	1. FC Kaiserslautern	Frankfurt
	Sturm 17'; Schäfer 57'; Fendel 80'			Stadium: Waldstadion; Attendance: 35,000; Referee: Skuballa (Hamburg)

=== Group 1 ===
Pos	Team	Pld	W	D	L	GF	GA	GR	Pts	Qualification	HSV	FCN	FKP	KOE
1	Hamburger SV	3	3	0	0	8	3	2.667	6	Advance to final	—	3–1	2–1	3–1
2	1. FC Nürnberg	3	1	1	1	7	8	0.875	3		—	—	4–3	—
3	FK Pirmasens	3	0	2	1	4	5	0.800	2		—	2–2	—	1–1
4	1. FC Köln	3	0	1	2	5	8	0.625	1		—	—	—	—

Source: RSSSF
Rules for classification: 1) Points; 2) Goal ratio.

Date	Match			Result	Stadium	Attendance
26 April 1958	Hamburger SV	–	1. FC Köln	3–1 (1–1)	Hannover, Niedersachsenstadion	75,000
26 April 1958	FK Pirmasens	–	1. FC Nürnberg	2–2 (1–0)	Stuttgart, Neckarstadion	70,000
4 May 1958	Hamburger SV	–	1. FC Nürnberg	3–1 (0–1)	Ludwigshafen, Südweststadion	70,000
4 May 1958	FK Pirmasens	–	1. FC Köln	1–1 (1–0)	Augsburg, Rosenaustadion	50,000
10 May 1958	1. FC Nürnberg	–	1. FC Köln	4–3 (1–3)	Berlin, Olympiastadion	25,000
10 May 1958	Hamburger SV	–	FK Pirmasens	2–1 (1–1)	Dortmund, Stadion Rote Erde	40,000

=== Group 2 ===
Pos	Team	Pld	W	D	L	GF	GA	GR	Pts	Qualification	S04	KSC	EBS	TBB
1	Schalke 04	3	3	0	0	16	1	16.000	6	Advance to final	—	3–0	4–1	9–0
2	Karlsruher SC	3	2	0	1	3	4	0.750	4		—	—	2–1	1–0
3	Eintracht Braunschweig	3	1	0	2	10	9	1.111	2		—	—	—	8–3
4	Tennis Borussia Berlin	3	0	0	3	3	18	0.167	0		—	—	—	—

Source: RSSSF
Rules for classification: 1) Points; 2) Goal ratio.

Date	Match			Result	Stadium	Attendance
26 April 1958	Karlsruher SC	–	Tennis Borussia Berlin	1–0 (0–0)	Cologne, Müngersdorfer Stadion	8,000
26 April 1958	FC Schalke 04	–	Eintracht Braunschweig	4–1 (1–1)	Frankfurt am Main, Waldstadion	20,000
4 May 1958	Karlsruher SC	–	Eintracht Braunschweig	2–1 (0–0)	Nuremberg, Städtisches Stadion	25,000
4 May 1958	FC Schalke 04	–	Tennis Borussia Berlin	9–0 (2–0)	Kassel, Auestadion	35,000
10 May 1958	FC Schalke 04	–	Karlsruher SC	3–0 (1–0)	Hamburg, Volksparkstadion	75,000
10 May 1958	Eintracht Braunschweig	–	Tennis Borussia Berlin	8–3 (3–1)	Oberhausen, Niederrheinstadion	2,000

=== Final ===
Date	Match			Result	Stadium	Attendance
18 May 1958	FC Schalke 04	–	Hamburger SV	3–0 (2–0)	Hannover, Niedersachsenstadion	81,000

FC Schalke 04:
GK	1	(West Germany) Manfred Orzessek
RB	2	(West Germany) Helmut Sadlowski
CB	5	(West Germany) Otto Laszig
LB	3	(West Germany) Günter Brocker
RH	4	(West Germany) Karl Borutta
LH	6	(West Germany) Günter Karnhof
OR	7	(West Germany) Willi Koslowski
IR	8	(West Germany) Heinz Kördell
CF	9	(West Germany) Günter Siebert
IL	10	(West Germany) Manfred Kreuz 80'
OL	11	(West Germany) Bernhard Klodt (c) 5' 29'
Manager:
(Austria) Eduard Frühwirth

Hamburger SV:
GK	1	(West Germany) Horst Schnoor
RB	2	(West Germany) Günter Schlegel
CB	5	(West Germany) Jupp Posipal (c)
LB	3	(West Germany) Franz Klepacz
RH	4	(West Germany) Jürgen Werner
LH	6	(West Germany) Jochen Meinke
OR	7	(West Germany) Gerhard Krug
IR	8	(West Germany) Klaus Stürmer
CF	9	(West Germany) Uwe Seeler
IL	10	(West Germany) Erwin Piechowiak
OL	11	(West Germany) Uwe Reuter
Manager:
(West Germany) Günter Mahlmann
