= Bernhard Klodt =

German footballer (1926–1996)

Personal information
- Date of birth: 26 October 1926
- Place of birth: Gelsenkirchen-Bismarck, Germany
- Date of death: 23 May 1996 (aged 69)
- Place of death: Garmisch-Partenkirchen, Germany
- Height: 1.72 m (5 ft 8 in)
- Position: Striker

Senior career*
| Years | Team | Apps | (Gls) |
| 1943–1948 | Schalke 04 | 59 | (29) |
| 1948–1950 | STV Horst Emscher | 53 | (18) |
| 1950–1963 | Schalke 04 | 306 | (121) |
| Total | | 418 | (168) |

International career
| 1950–1959 | West Germany | 19 | (3) |
Medal record
Representing West Germany
FIFA World Cup
| Winner | 1954 Switzerland |
- * Club domestic league appearances and goals

Bernhard "Berni" Klodt (26 October 1926 – 23 May 1996) was a German footballer who played as a striker.

== Career ==
Klodt was born in Gelsenkirchen-Bismarck; the goalkeeper Hans Klodt was his elder brother (they are among 14 sets of siblings to have played for Germany). In his club career, Klodt played mainly for Schalke 04. He debuted in the senior team of the club on 17 January 1943 at the age of 16, where he scored a goal in a 6–2 victory over Westfalia Herne.

Aged 36, Klodt ended his career in 1963 with the start of the Bundesliga. In his last game, he scored the only goal in Schalke's 1–0 victory against the Bulgaria national team on 18 June 1963. He played in 330 Oberliga West games in which he scored 129 goals.

Between 1950 and 1959, Klodt played 19 times and scored three goals for the West Germany national team. He was part of the 1954 FIFA World Cup-winning squad, and also played in the 1958 FIFA World Cup.

During the 1954 World Cup, Klodt had started in the outside right position instead of Helmut Rahn. He played in both games against Turkey. Although he played fairly well in both games, Sepp Herberger decided to replace him with Rahn for the quarterfinal against Yugoslavia. Herberger's decision at first was not exclusively greeted with enthusiasm by the press, but after Rahn had scored against Yugoslavia, Klodt was out of the team for good. The basis for Herberger's decision was his hope that Rahn with his unconventional style and shooting prowess was more likely to turn around a game than any other player. Contrary to Rahn, Klodt was said to be less of an individualist and more of a teamplayer.

== Later life ==
After his retirement from football, Klodt among other things coached the youth team of FC Schalke 04 and also worked as salesman for a brewery. After suffering a heart attack and a stroke in 1990, he was paralysed from the right.

== Career statistics ==
=== Club ===
Appearances and goals by club, season and competition
| Club | Season | League | | | German Championship | | Cup | | Europe | | Other (Note: Includes Westphalian Cup (1943–1944), Westphalian / British zone championship (1947), Western German Cup (1955–1963)) | | Total | |
| Club | Season | Division | Apps | Goals | Apps | Goals | Apps | Goals | Apps | Goals | Apps | Goals | Apps | Goals |
|---|---|---|---|---|---|---|---|---|---|---|---|---|---|---|
| Schalke 04 | 1942–43 | Gauliga Westfalen | 3 | 2 | 1 | 0 | — | | — | | 5 | 0 | 9 | 2 |
| Schalke 04 | 1943–44 | Gauliga Westfalen | 11 | 5 | 1 | 0 | 2 | 0 | — | | 1 | 0 | 15 | 5 |
| Schalke 04 | 1944–45 | Gauliga Westfalen | 0 | 0 | — | | — | | — | | — | | 0 | 0 |
| Schalke 04 | 1945–46 | Landesliga Westfalen | 5 | 2 | — | | — | | — | | — | | 5 | 2 |
| Schalke 04 | 1946–47 | Landesliga Westfalen | 16 | 12 | — | | — | | — | | 5 | 0 | 21 | 12 |
| Schalke 04 | 1947–48 | Oberliga West | 24 | 8 | — | | — | | — | | — | | 24 | 8 |
| Schalke 04 | Total | | 59 | 29 | 2 | 0 | 2 | 0 | — | | 11 | 0 | 74 | 29 |
| STV Horst-Emscher | 1948–49 | Oberliga West | 24 | 10 | — | | — | | — | | — | | 24 | 10 |
| STV Horst-Emscher | 1949–50 | Oberliga West | 29 | 8 | 1 | 1 | — | | — | | — | | 30 | 9 |
| STV Horst-Emscher | Total | | 53 | 18 | 1 | 1 | — | | — | | — | | 54 | 19 |
| Schalke 04 | 1950–51 | Oberliga West | 26 | 8 | 2 | 0 | — | | — | | — | | 28 | 8 |
| Schalke 04 | 1951–52 | Oberliga West | 28 | 16 | 6 | 2 | — | | — | | — | | 34 | 18 |
| Schalke 04 | 1952–53 | Oberliga West | 26 | 9 | — | | 1 | 0 | — | | — | | 27 | 9 |
| Schalke 04 | 1953–54 | Oberliga West | 29 | 12 | — | | — | | — | | — | | 29 | 12 |
| Schalke 04 | 1954–55 | Oberliga West | 26 | 5 | — | | 5 | 0 | — | | — | | 31 | 5 |
| Schalke 04 | 1955–56 | Oberliga West | 28 | 13 | 6 | 2 | — | | — | | 1 | 0 | 35 | 15 |
| Schalke 04 | 1956–57 | Oberliga West | 28 | 12 | — | | — | | — | | 2 | 0 | 30 | 12 |
| Schalke 04 | 1957–58 | Oberliga West | 28 | 15 | 4 | 5 | — | | — | | — | | 32 | 20 |
| Schalke 04 | 1958–59 | Oberliga West | 28 | 9 | — | | — | | 7 | 3 | 2 | 2 | 37 | 14 |
| Schalke 04 | 1959–60 | Oberliga West | 20 | 4 | — | | — | | — | | 1 | 0 | 21 | 4 |
| Schalke 04 | 1960–61 | Oberliga West | 14 | 6 | — | | — | | — | | — | | 14 | 6 |
| Schalke 04 | 1961–62 | Oberliga West | 25 | 12 | 4 | 1 | 0 | 0 | — | | 2 | 1 | 31 | 14 |
| Schalke 04 | 1962–63 | Oberliga West | 0 | 0 | — | | 0 | 0 | — | | 1 | 0 | 1 | 0 |
| Schalke 04 | Total | | 306 | 121 | 22 | 10 | 6 | 0 | 7 | 3 | 9 | 3 | 350 | 137 |
| Schalke 04 total | | | 365 | 150 | 24 | 10 | 8 | 0 | 7 | 3 | 20 | 3 | 424 | 166 |
| Career total | | | 418 | 168 | 25 | 11 | 8 | 0 | 7 | 3 | 20 | 3 | 478 | 185 |

=== International ===
Appearances and goals by national team and year
| National team | Year | Apps | Goals |
|---|---|---|---|
| West Germany | 1950 | 1 | 0 |
| West Germany | 1951 | 1 | 0 |
| West Germany | 1952 | 3 | 1 |
| West Germany | 1953 | 0 | 0 |
| West Germany | 1954 | 6 | 1 |
| West Germany | 1955 | 0 | 0 |
| West Germany | 1956 | 2 | 0 |
| West Germany | 1957 | 1 | 0 |
| West Germany | 1958 | 4 | 1 |
| West Germany | 1959 | 1 | 0 |
| Total | | 19 | 3 |

== Honours ==
Schalke 04

- German Championship: 1958

West Germany

- FIFA World Cup: 1954
