= 1956–57 Swiss Cup =

Tournament details
- Country: Switzerland

Final positions
- Champions: La Chaux-de-Fonds
- Runners-up: Lausanne-Sport

The 1956–57 Swiss Cup was the 32nd season of Switzerland's football cup competition, organised annually since 1925–26 by the Swiss Football Association.

== Overview ==
This season's cup competition began with the games of the first round, played on the week-end of 23 September 1956. The competition was to be completed on Whit Monday, 10 June 1957, with the final, which was traditionally held at the former Wankdorf Stadium in Bern. The clubs from the 1956–57 Swiss 1. Liga were given a bye for the first round, they joined the competition in the second round on the week-end of 7 October. The clubs from this season's Nationalliga A (NLA) and from this season's Nationalliga B (NLB) were given byes for the first two rounds. These teams joined the competition in the third round, which was played on the week-end of 20 and 21 October.

The matches were played in a knockout format. In the event of a draw after 90 minutes, the match went into extra time. In the event of a draw at the end of extra time, a replay was foreseen and this was played on the visiting team's pitch. If the replay ended in a draw after extra time, a toss of a coin would establish the team that qualified for the next round.

== Round 1 ==
In the first phase, the lower league teams that had qualified themselves for the competition through their regional football association's regional cup competitions or their association's requirements, competed here. Whenever possible, the draw respected local regionalities. The first round was played on the weekend of 23 September 1956.

=== Summary ===
Team 1	Score	Team 2
23 September 1956
Chênois	6–2	FC Compesières (GE)
FC Versoix	2–0	FC Geneva (GE)
FC Aubonne	3–4	FC Saint-Prex
FC Renens	3–1 (a.e.t.)	US Lausanne
FC Concordia Lausanne	6–1	FC Bussigny
FC Orbe	1–1 (a.e.t.)	FC Sainte-Croix
FC Estavayer-le-Lac	6–2 (a.e.t.)	FC Portalban
FC Couvet	0–1	Neuchâtel Xamax
Central Fribourg	5–1 abd Forfeit 3–0	Bulle
FC Auvernier	0–1	FC Hauterive
FC Revonvilier	3–0	Étoile-Sporting
Alle	1–2	Laufen
FC Roggwil	1–5	FC Langenthal
Zähringia Bern	3–0	FC Lerchenfeld (Thun)
FC Länggasse (Bern)	1–3 (a.e.t.)	FC Helvetia Bern
SV Lyss	2–3	FC Bözingen 34
SC Binningen	0–3	FC Riehen
FC Münchenstein	3–1	FC Reinach (BL)
SV Sissach	0–4	Old Boys
FC Subingen	3–2	Wacker Grenchen
FC Selzach	1–1 (a.e.t.)	FC Gerlafingen
FC Lenzburg	1–2	FC Gränichen
FC Turgi	1–4	Wettingen
FC Wollishofen	9–1	FC Zürich-Affoltern
FC Wald (Baden)	4–5 (a.e.t.)	Ballspielclub Zürich
FC Phönix Seen (Winterthur)	2–1	FC Wiedikon
FC Rapperswil	0–2	FC Küsnacht (ZH)
FC Wädenswil	4–1	FC Lachen
FC Thayngen	1–2	FC Münchwilen
Vaduz	4–1	FC Widnau
FC Amriswil	7–0	FC Winkeln (SG)
Chur	9–2	FC Uznach
Luzerner SC	9–1	FC Hochdorf
FC Brunnen	3–4 (a.e.t.)	FC Altdorf
FC Solduno	4–1	Lamone Sportiva
30 September 1956
FC Saint-Leonard	0–2	FC Aigle

Replays

Team 1	Score	Team 2
30 September 1956
FC Sainte-Croix	2–1	FC Orbe
FC Gerlafingen	4–2	FC Selzach

== Round 2 ==
The clubs from the 1956–57 Swiss 1. Liga had been given a bye for the first round, they now joined the competition here, in the second round.

=== Summary ===
Team 1	Score	Team 2
7 October 1956
Vaduz	2–3	FC Wil
FC Rorschach	6–1	Chur
Arbon	0–5	FC Amriswil
FC Oerlikon (ZH)	4–3	Wettingen
Red Star	9–0	FC Münchwilen
FC Gränichen	1–4	Blue Stars
Locarno	6–2	FC Wädenswil
Bodio	4–1	Ballspielclub Zürich
FC Rapid Lugano	6–2	FC Wollishofen
FC Solduno	4–3	Mendrisio
Luzerner SC	0–5	Emmenbrücke
FC Küsnacht (ZH)	1–2	Aarau
Baden	6–2	FC Phönix Seen (Winterthur)
FC Olten	4–5	FC Riehen
SC Kleinhüningen	6–1	FC Münchenstein
FC Birsfelden	4–0	FC Subingen
FC Gerlafingen	1–3	FC Bassecourt
FC Revonvilier	4–5 (a.e.t.)	Concordia Basel
FC Porrentruy	5–1	Laufen
Delémont	1–3	Old Boys
SC Derendingen	4–1	FC Langenthal
Saint-Imier-Sports	1–4	Neuchâtel Xamax
FC Hauterive	0–6	Moutier
FC Helvetia Bern	3–4	Burgdorf
US Bienne-Boujean	5–2	Zähringia Bern
FC Bözingen 34	6–1	FC Stade Payerne
Central Fribourg	2–1	Vevey Sports
FC Estavayer-le-Lac	3–2	CS La Tour-de-Peilz
FC Concordia Lausanne	3–1	FC Sierre
Montreux-Sports	6–1	FC Sainte-Croix
FC Renens	0–3	Monthey
CS International GE	3–1	FC Saint-Prex
FC Versoix	2–3	Sion
Chênois	1–0	Martigny-Sports
FC Aigle	1–4	FC Forward Morges
FC Brunnen	ppd	US Pro Daro

Replay

Team 1	Score	Team 2
14 October 1956
FC Brunnen (t)	2–2 (a.e.t.)	US Pro Daro

- Note: (t): FC Brunnen qualified on toss of a coin.

=== Matches ===
7 October 1956

FC Küsnacht (ZH)	1–2	Aarau
Goal	FCA summary	Goal

Stadion Brügglifeld, Aarau

== Round 3 ==
The teams from the NLA and NLB entered the cup competition in this round. However, the teams from the NLA were seeded and could not be drawn against each other. Whenever possible, the draw respected local regionalities. The third round was played on the week-end of 20 and 21 October 1956.

=== Summary ===
Team 1	Score	Team 2
20 October 1956
Monthey	0–4	Lausanne-Sport
21 October 1956
La Chaux-de-Fonds	11–2	FC Concordia Lausanne
Montreux-Sports	2–6	Fribourg
Lengnau	4–1	FC Bassecourt
Young Boys	6–1	Concordia Basel
Yverdon-Sport	4–1	FC Forward Morges
Cantonal Neuchâtel	6–1 (a.e.t.)	Neuchâtel Xamax
Emmenbrücke	1–0	St. Gallen
FC Riehen	0–7	Grasshopper Club
Chiasso	0–2	Bodio
Brühl	2–4	Baden
Aarau	1–3 (a.e.t.)	Young Fellows
SC Derendingen	0–3	Nordstern
FC Rorschach	0–8	Zürich
ES Malley	5–3	Central Fribourg
Urania Genève Sport	3–1	FC Bözingen 34
Chênois	0–3	Servette
US Bienne-Boujean	1–2	Grenchen
Biel-Bienne	4–1	Sion
FC Rapid Lugano	3–5	Locarno
Old Boys	1–3	SC Kleinhüningen
Bern	1–3	FC Porrentruy
CS International Genève	5–1	FC Estavayer-le-Lac
Thun	4–0	Moutier
Solothurn	3–2 (a.e.t.)	FC Birsfelden
FC Amriswil	2–2 (a.e.t.)	Blue Stars
FC Brunnen	3–2	Bellinzona
Luzern	2–1 (a.e.t.)	Red Star
Burgdorf	0–1	Basel
Winterthur	4–2	FC Oerlikon (ZH)
Lugano	4–0	FC Solduno
Schaffhausen	1–0	FC Wil

Replay

Team 1	Score	Team 2
28 October 1956
Blue Stars	5–1	FC Amriswil

=== Matches ===
21 October 1956

Young Boys	6–1	Concordia Basel
Goal	YB summary	Goal

Wankdorf Stadium, Bern

21 October 1956

Aarau	1–2 (a.e.t.)	Young Fellows
Goal	FCA summary	Goal

Stadion Brügglifeld, Aarau

21 October 1956

FC Rorschach	0–8	Zürich
	FCZ summary	(0:1) Schneider (0:2) Schneider (0:3) Schneider (pen.) Bruppacher (0:5) Henchoz (0:6) Feller (0:7) Henchoz (0:8)

Sportplatz Pestalozzi, Rorschach
Attendance: 2,200
Referee: (Switzerland) Adolf Vettori (Baden)

21 October 1956

Chênois	0–3	Servette
	Servette summary	(o.g.) (0:2) Pastega (0:3) Pastega

Stade des Trois-Chêne, Thônex

21 October 1956
15:00

SC Burgdorf	0–1	Basel
Probst (penalty missed) 32′	FCB summary	(red card) 75' Bielser; 86' (0:1) Hügi (II)

Neumatt, Burgdorf
Attendance: 2,600
Referee: (Switzerland) Peccorini (Geneva)

== Round 4 ==
=== Summary ===
Team 1	Score	Team 2
2 December 1956
La Chaux-de-Fonds	2–1	Fribourg
Lengnau	2–1	Thun
Young Boys	3–0	Yverdon-Sport
Solothurn	3–4	Cantonal Neuchâtel
Emmenbrücke	2–1	Blue Stars
FC Brunnen	0–3	Grasshopper Club
Luzern	0–0 (a.e.t.)	Basel
Bodio	0–1	Winterthur
Baden	1–2	Young Fellows
Nordstern	4–2 (a.e.t.)	Zürich
ES Malley	0–2	Urania Genève Sport
Lugano	1–0	Schaffhausen
Servette	4–2	Grenchen
Lausanne-Sport	2–2 (a.e.t.)	Biel-Bienne
Locarno	6–3	SC Kleinhüningen
FC Porrentruy	1–3	CS International Genève

Replays

Team 1	Score	Team 2
23 December 1956
Basel	0–2	Luzern
Biel-Bienne	1–2 (a.e.t.)	Lausanne-Sport

=== Matches ===
2 December 1956

Young Boys	3–0	Yverdon-Sport
Goal	YB summary

Wankdorf Stadium, Bern

2 December 1956

Luzern	0–0 (a.e.t.)	Basel
	FCB summary

Stadion Allmend, Luzern
Attendance: 4,600
Referee: (Switzerland) Emilio Guidi (Bellinzona)

23 December 1956
14:30
Replay

Basel	0–2	Luzern
	FCB summary	63' (o.g. 0:1) Thüler; 80' (0:2) Beerli

Landhof, Basel
Attendance: 4,500
Referee: (Switzerland) Victor Werner Schicker (Bern)

2 December 1956

Nordstern	4–2 (a.e.t.)	Zürich
Kirchhofer 6' (1:0); Burger 49' (2:1); Burger 91' (3:2); Kunz 117' (4:2)	FCZ summary	38' (1:1) Bruppacher; 84' (2:2) Bruppacher

Rankhof, Basel
Attendance: 2,800
Referee: (Switzerland) Fritz Zutter (Bern)

2 December 1956

Servette	4–2	Grenchen
Bernasconi; Anker; Pastega; Rothacher	Servette summary	Goal

Stade des Charmilles, Geneva

== Round 5 ==
=== Summary ===
Team 1	Score	Team 2
23 December 1956
La Chaux-de-Fonds	4–1	Lengnau
Young Boys	6–0	Cantonal Neuchâtel
Emmenbrücke	2–5	Grasshopper Club
Young Fellows	2–3	Nordstern
Urania Genève Sport	2–0	Lugano
Locarno	2–1	CS International Genève
30 December 1956
Luzern	2–0	Winterthur
Servette	1–2	Lausanne-Sport

=== Matches ===
23 December 1956

Young Boys	6–0	Cantonal Neuchâtel
Goal	YB summary

Wankdorf Stadium, Bern

30 December 1956

Servette	1–2	Lausanne-Sport
Bernasconi	Servette summary	Goal

Stade des Charmilles, Geneva

== Quarter-finals ==
=== Summary ===
Team 1	Score	Team 2
30 December 1956
La Chaux-de-Fonds	4–3	Young Boys
Nordstern	4–1	Urania Genève Sport
6 January 1957
Lausanne-Sport	3–0	Locarno
Luzern	0–2	Grasshopper Club

=== Matches ===
30 December 1956

La Chaux-de-Fonds	4–3	Young Boys
Goal	YB summary	Goal

Centre Sportif de la Charrière, La Chaux-de-Fonds

== Semi-finals ==
=== Summary ===
Team 1	Score	Team 2
22 April 1957
La Chaux-de-Fonds	1–0	Grasshopper Club
Nordstern	1–2	Lausanne-Sport

=== Matches ===
22 April 1957

La Chaux-de-Fonds	1–0	Grasshopper Club
Pottier 34' (1:0)	RSSSF summary

Wankdorf Stadium, Bern

22 April 1957

Nordstern	1–2	Lausanne-Sport
Burger 84' (1:2)	RSSSF summary	30' (0:1) Eschmann; 64' (0:2) Vonlanthen

Rankhof, Basel

== Final ==
The final was held at the former Wankdorf Stadium in Bern on Whit Monday 1957.

=== Summary ===
Team 1	Score	Team 2
10 June 1957
La Chaux-de-Fonds	3–1	Lausanne-Sport

=== Telegram ===
10 June 1957

La Chaux-de-Fonds	3–1	Lausanne-Sport
Mauron 26' (1:0); Antenen 49' (2:0); Kauer 72' (3:0)	Fussball-Schweiz summary	74' (3:1) Eschmann

Wankdorf Stadium, Bern
Attendance: 19,500
Referee: (Switzerland) Victor Werner Schicker (Bern)

La Chaux-de-Fonds won the cup and this was the club's fifth cup title to this date.

== Further in Swiss football ==
- 1956–57 Nationalliga A
- 1956–57 Swiss 1. Liga

== Sources ==
- Fussball-Schweiz
- FCB Cup games 1956–57 at fcb-achiv.ch
- Switzerland 1956–57 at RSSSF

Preceded by 1955–56	Swiss Cup seasons	Succeeded by 1957–58
