= Manfred Orzessek =

German footballer

Personal information
- Full name: Manfred Orzessek
- Date of birth: 30 June 1933
- Date of death: 12 April 2012 (aged 78)
- Place of death: Mönchengladbach, Germany
- Height: 1.76 m (5 ft 9 in)
- Position: Goalkeeper

Senior career*
Years	Team	Apps	(Gls)
1952–1953	Eintracht Gelsenkirchen		
1953–1961	FC Schalke 04	160	(0)
1961–1969	Borussia Mönchengladbach	64	(0)

International career
1955	West Germany U-23	1	(0)

Managerial career
- TuS Grevenbroich
- * Club domestic league appearances and goals

Manfred Orzessek (30 June 1933 – 12 April 2012) was a German football goalkeeper playing most of his career for FC Schalke 04 and Borussia Mönchengladbach.

He won the German championship with Schalke in 1958.
