= 1956–57 Swiss 1. Liga =

1. Liga
- Season: 1956–57
- Champions: 1. Liga champions: Concordia; Group West: FC Sion; Group Cenral: Concordia; Group South and East: FC Locarno
- Promoted: Concordia; FC Sion
- Relegated: Group West: Montreux-Sports; Group Central: Saint-Imier-Sports; Group South and East: FC Oerlikon; FC Arbon
- Matches: 3 times 132 plus 6 play-offs and 3 play-outs

The 1956–57 1. Liga season was the 25th season of the 1. Liga since its creation in 1931. At this time, the 1. Liga was the third-tier of the Swiss football league system and it was the highest level of total amateur football. At this time, the clubs in the two higher divisions in Switzerland were starting to employ semi-professional or even professional players.

== Format ==
There were 36 teams competing in the 1. Liga 1956–57 season. They were divided into three regional groups, each group with 12 teams. Within each group, the teams would play a double round-robin to decide their league position. Two points were awarded for a win and one point was awarded for a draw. The three group winners then contested a play-off round to decide the two promotion slots. The last placed team in each group were directly relegated to the 2. Liga (fourth tier). The three second last placed teams were to contest a play-out to decide the fourth relegation slot.

== Group West ==
=== Teams, locations ===
| Club | Based in | Canton | Stadium | Capacity |
|---|---|---|---|---|
| US Bienne-Boujean | Biel/Bienne | Bern | | |
| SC Burgdorf | Burgdorf | Bern | Stadion Neumatt | 3,850 |
| CS International Genève | Geneva | Geneva | | |
| FC La Tour/Le Pâquier | La Tour-de-Trême (Bulle) | Fribourg | Stade de Bouleyres | 7,000 |
| FC Martigny-Sports | Martigny | Valais | Stade d'Octodure | 2,500 |
| FC Monthey | Monthey | Valais | Stade Philippe Pottier | 1,800 |
| FC Montreux-Sports | Montreux | Vaud | Stade de Chailly | 1,000 |
| FC Forward Morges | Morges | Vaud | Parc des Sports | 600 |
| FC Sierre | Sierre | Valais | Complexe Ecossia | 2,000 |
| FC Sion | Sion | Valais | Parc des sports (Tourbillon) | 8,000 |
| FC Stade Payerne | Payerne | Vaud | Stade Municipal | 1,100 |
| Vevey Sports | Vevey | Vaud | Stade de Copet | 4,000 |

=== Final league table ===
| Pos | Team | Pld | W | D | L | GF | GA | GD | Pts | Qualification or relegation |
|---|---|---|---|---|---|---|---|---|---|---|
| 1 | FC Sion | 22 | 16 | 5 | 1 | 67 | 12 | +55 | 37 | To promotion play-off |
| 2 | Vevey Sports | 22 | 14 | 5 | 3 | 72 | 27 | +45 | 33 | |
| 3 | FC Martigny-Sports | 22 | 14 | 3 | 5 | 57 | 26 | +31 | 31 | |
| 4 | US Bienne-Boujean | 22 | 12 | 5 | 5 | 54 | 41 | +13 | 29 | |
| 5 | SC Burgdorf | 22 | 11 | 2 | 9 | 50 | 47 | +3 | 24 | |
| 6 | FC Monthey | 22 | 9 | 5 | 8 | 40 | 35 | +5 | 23 | |
| 7 | FC Forward Morges | 22 | 6 | 6 | 10 | 25 | 38 | −13 | 18 | |
| 8 | FC Sierre | 22 | 6 | 5 | 11 | 39 | 55 | −16 | 17 | |
| 9 | CS International Genève | 22 | 5 | 6 | 11 | 48 | 65 | −17 | 16 | |
| 10 | FC Stade Payerne | 22 | 6 | 3 | 13 | 41 | 47 | −6 | 15 | |
| 11 | CS La Tour-de-Peilz | 22 | 4 | 4 | 14 | 22 | 64 | −42 | 12 | Play-out against relegation |
| 12 | FC Montreux-Sports | 22 | 3 | 3 | 16 | 24 | 82 | −58 | 9 | Relegation to 2. Liga |

Source: rsssf
Rules for classification: 1) Points; 2) Goal difference within the league, but decider play-off for qualifiers.

== Group Central ==
=== Teams, locations ===
| Club | Based in | Canton | Stadium | Capacity |
|---|---|---|---|---|
| FC Aarau | Aarau | Aargau | Stadion Brügglifeld | 9,240 |
| FC Baden | Baden | Aargau | Esp Stadium | 7,000 |
| FC Bassecourt | Bassecourt | Jura | Stade des Grands-Prés | 3,650 |
| FC Birsfelden | Birsfelden | Basel-Landschaft | Sternenfeld | 9,400 |
| FC Concordia Basel | Basel | Basel-Stadt | Stadion Rankhof | 7,000 |
| SR Delémont | Delémont | Jura | La Blancherie | 5,263 |
| SC Derendingen | Derendingen | Solothurn | Heidenegg | 1,500 |
| SC Kleinhüningen | Basel | Basel-Stadt | Sportplatz Schorenmatte | 300 |
| FC Moutier | Moutier | Bern | Stade de Chalière | 5,000 |
| FC Olten | Olten | Solothurn | Sportanlagen Kleinholz | 8,000 |
| FC Porrentruy | Porrentruy | Jura | Stade du Tirage | 4,226 |
| Saint-Imier-Sports | Saint-Imier | Bern | Terrain de Fin-des-Fourches | 1,000 |

=== Final league table ===
| Pos | Team | Pld | W | D | L | GF | GA | GD | Pts | Qualification or relegation |
|---|---|---|---|---|---|---|---|---|---|---|
| 1 | FC Concordia Basel | 22 | 16 | 3 | 3 | 65 | 26 | +39 | 35 | To promotion play-off |
| 2 | FC Baden | 22 | 10 | 5 | 7 | 30 | 31 | −1 | 25 | |
| 3 | FC Aarau | 22 | 9 | 6 | 7 | 43 | 37 | +6 | 24 | |
| 4 | FC Olten | 22 | 11 | 2 | 9 | 48 | 45 | +3 | 24 | |
| 5 | SC Derendingen | 22 | 9 | 5 | 8 | 47 | 42 | +5 | 23 | |
| 6 | SR Delémont | 22 | 10 | 3 | 9 | 38 | 44 | −6 | 23 | |
| 7 | FC Porrentruy | 22 | 8 | 4 | 10 | 35 | 32 | +3 | 20 | |
| 8 | FC Bassecourt | 22 | 9 | 2 | 11 | 27 | 44 | −17 | 20 | |
| 9 | FC Moutier | 22 | 7 | 5 | 10 | 32 | 39 | −7 | 19 | |
| 10 | SC Kleinhüningen | 22 | 6 | 6 | 10 | 32 | 39 | −7 | 18 | |
| 11 | FC Birsfelden | 22 | 7 | 3 | 12 | 56 | 53 | +3 | 17 | Play-out against relegation |
| 12 | Saint-Imier-Sports | 22 | 5 | 6 | 11 | 24 | 45 | −21 | 16 | Relegation to 2. Liga |

Source: rsssf
Rules for classification: 1) Points; 2) Goal difference within the league, but decider play-off for qualifiers.

== Group South and East ==
=== Teams, locations ===
| Club | Based in | Canton | Stadium | Capacity |
|---|---|---|---|---|
| FC Arbon | Arbon | Thurgau | Stacherholz | 1,000 |
| FC Blue Stars Zürich | Zürich | Zürich | Hardhof | 1,000 |
| FC Bodio | Bodio | Ticino | Campo comunale Pollegio | 1,000 |
| FC Emmenbrücke | Emmen | Lucerne | Stadion Gersag | 8,700 |
| FC Locarno | Locarno | Ticino | Stadio comunale Lido | 5,000 |
| FC Mendrisio | Mendrisio | Ticino | Centro Sportivo Comunale | 4,000 |
| FC Oerlikon | Oerlikon (Zürich) | Zürich | Sportanlage Neudorf | 1,000 |
| US Pro Daro | Bellinzona | Ticino | Campo Geretta / Stadio Comunale Bellinzona | 500 / 5,000 |
| FC Rapid Lugano | Lugano | Ticino | Cornaredo Stadium | 6,330 |
| FC Red Star Zürich | Zürich | Zürich | Allmend Brunau | 2,000 |
| FC Rorschach | Rorschach | Schwyz | Sportplatz Kellen | 1,000 |
| FC Wil | Wil | St. Gallen | Sportpark Bergholz | 6,048 |

=== Final league table ===
| Pos | Team | Pld | W | D | L | GF | GA | GD | Pts | Qualification or relegation |
|---|---|---|---|---|---|---|---|---|---|---|
| 1 | FC Locarno | 22 | 15 | 4 | 3 | 58 | 24 | +34 | 34 | To promotion play-off |
| 2 | FC Wil | 22 | 10 | 8 | 4 | 50 | 36 | +14 | 28 | |
| 3 | FC Rapid Lugano | 22 | 11 | 4 | 7 | 44 | 28 | +16 | 26 | |
| 4 | FC Blue Stars Zürich | 22 | 9 | 5 | 8 | 46 | 37 | +9 | 23 | |
| 5 | FC Emmenbrücke | 22 | 9 | 5 | 8 | 41 | 47 | −6 | 23 | |
| 6 | FC Bodio | 22 | 10 | 2 | 10 | 44 | 46 | −2 | 22 | |
| 7 | FC Rorschach | 22 | 8 | 6 | 8 | 26 | 30 | −4 | 22 | |
| 8 | FC Red Star Zürich | 22 | 8 | 4 | 10 | 43 | 45 | −2 | 20 | |
| 9 | US Pro Daro | 22 | 7 | 5 | 10 | 33 | 41 | −8 | 19 | |
| 10 | FC Mendrisio | 22 | 7 | 5 | 10 | 33 | 41 | −8 | 19 | |
| 11 | FC Oerlikon | 22 | 5 | 5 | 12 | 29 | 41 | −12 | 15 | Play-out against relegation |
| 12 | FC Arbon | 22 | 3 | 7 | 12 | 31 | 62 | −31 | 13 | Relegation to 2. Liga |

Source: rsssf
Rules for classification: 1) Points; 2) Goal difference within the league, but decider play-off for qualifiers.

== Promotion, relegation ==
=== Promotion play-off ===
The three group winners played a single round-robin to decide the two promotion slots. The games were played on 16, 23 and 30 June 1958.

==== Round robin ====
| Pos | Team | Pld | W | D | L | GF | GA | GD | Pts | CON | SIO | LOC |
|---|---|---|---|---|---|---|---|---|---|---|---|---|
| 1 | FC Concordia Basel | 2 | 1 | 0 | 1 | 7 | 2 | +5 | 2 | — | — | 7–1 |
| 2 | FC Sion | 2 | 1 | 0 | 1 | 2 | 2 | 0 | 2 | 1–0 | — | — |
| 3 | FC Locarno | 2 | 1 | 0 | 1 | 3 | 8 | −5 | 2 | — | 2–1 | — |

Source: rsssf
Rules for classification: 1) Points; 2) Head-to-head 3) Decider.

==== Replay ====
Because of the egality of the teams, a return round was required. The games were played on 6, 13 and 20 July.

| Pos | Team | Pld | W | D | L | GF | GA | GD | Pts | CON | SIO | LOC |
|---|---|---|---|---|---|---|---|---|---|---|---|---|
| 1 | FC Concordia Basel | 2 | 1 | 0 | 1 | 4 | 6 | −2 | 2 | — | 4–2 | — |
| 2 | FC Sion | 2 | 1 | 0 | 1 | 5 | 5 | 0 | 2 | — | — | 3–1 |
| 3 | FC Locarno | 2 | 1 | 0 | 1 | 5 | 3 | +2 | 2 | 4–0 | — | — |

Source: rsssf
Rules for classification: 1) Points; 2) Head-to-head 3) accumulation of both rounds.

==== Final table ====
Because of the egality on points, the goal-average of both rounds added together decided the championship.

| Pos | Team | Pld | W | D | L | GF | GA | GD | Pts | Qualification or relegation |
|---|---|---|---|---|---|---|---|---|---|---|
| 1 | FC Concordia Basel | 4 | 2 | 0 | 2 | 11 | 8 | +3 | 4 | Champions and promoted |
| 2 | FC Sion | 4 | 2 | 0 | 2 | 7 | 7 | 0 | 4 | Promoted |
| 3 | FC Locarno | 4 | 2 | 0 | 2 | 8 | 11 | −3 | 4 | |

Source: rsssf
Rules for classification: 1) Goal-average of both rounds.

Team Concordia were declaired 1. Liga champions and together with second placed Sion were promoted to the 1957–58 Nationalliga B.

=== Relegation play-out ===
The three second last placed teams from each group contested a play-out to decide the fourth and final relegation slot. The games were played on 23, 30 June and 7 July 1957.

| Pos | Team | Pld | W | D | L | GF | GA | GD | Pts | Qualification or relegation | BIR | TdP | POL |
|---|---|---|---|---|---|---|---|---|---|---|---|---|---|
| 1 | FC Birsfelden | 2 | 2 | 0 | 0 | 5 | 2 | +3 | 4 | | — | — | 2–0 |
| 2 | CS La Tour-de-Peilz | 2 | 1 | 0 | 1 | 5 | 5 | 0 | 2 | | 2–3 | — | — |
| 3 | FC Oerlikon | 2 | 0 | 0 | 2 | 2 | 5 | −3 | 0 | Relegation | — | 2–3 | — |

Source: rsssf
Rules for classification: 1) Points; 2) Head-to-head 3) Decider.

Team Oerlikon were relegated to 2. Liga.

== Further in Swiss football ==
- 1956–57 Nationalliga A
- 1956–57 Nationalliga B
- 1956–57 Swiss Cup

== Sources ==
- Switzerland 1956–57 at RSSSF

| Preceded by 1955–56 | Seasons in Swiss 1. Liga | Succeeded by 1957–58 |
