= Joseph Givard =

Belgian footballer (1923–1981)

Personal information
- Date of birth: 7 May 1923
- Place of birth: Herstal, Belgium
- Date of death: 29 August 1981 (aged 58)
- Position: Midfielder

Senior career*
Years	Team	Apps	(Gls)
- A.S. Herstalienne
1952–1960	Standard Liège		
- A.S. Herstalienne

International career
1951–1957	Belgium	8	(1)
- * Club domestic league appearances and goals

Joseph Givard (7 May 1923 – 29 August 1981) was a Belgian footballer who played as a midfielder, notably for Standard Liège. He made eight appearances for the Belgium national team from 1951 to 1957. He was also named in Belgium's squad for the Group 2 qualification tournament for the 1954 FIFA World Cup.
