= Karel Mallants =

Belgian footballer (born 1935)

Personal information
- Date of birth: 4 November 1935 (age 90)

Senior career*
Years	Team	Apps	(Gls)
1953–1956	Wezel Sport		
1956–1963	Standard Liège	123	(37)
1964–1967	Royal Tilleur		

International career
1958–1960	Belgium	2	(1)
- * Club domestic league appearances and goals

Karel Mallants (born 4 November 1935) is a retired Belgian football midfielder.
