= Josef Hamerl =

Austrian footballer

Personal information
- Full name: Josef Hamerl
- Date of birth: 22 January 1931
- Place of birth: Austria
- Date of death: 15 July 2017 (aged 86)
- Place of death: Austria
- Height: 1.91 m (6 ft 3 in)
- Position: Striker

Youth career
- 1945: ASK Erlaa
- 1945–1952: SC Siebenhirten

Senior career*
Years	Team	Apps	(Gls)
1952–1956	FC Wien	71	(37)
1955	Austria Wien	3	(0)
1956–1961	Wiener Sportclub	106	(76)
1961–1963	SK Admira Wien	47	(21)
1963–1965	Wiener Sportclub	34	(9)
1965–1966	Kapfenberger SV	25	(11)
1966–1967	1. Wiener Neustädter SC	15	(3)
Total		301	(157)

International career
1958–1962	Austria	9	(2)
- * Club domestic league appearances and goals

Josef "Pepi" Hamerl (22 January 1931 – 15 July 2017) was a former Austrian football player.

== Club career ==
Hamerl played for several clubs, including FC Wien (1952–1955, 1955–1956), Austria Wien (1955), Wiener Sportclub (1956–1961, 1963–1965) and SK Admira Wien (1961–1963). He scored 158 goals in total in the Austrian Football Bundesliga.

== International career ==
He made his debut for Austria in March 1958 against Italy and was a participant at the 1958 FIFA World Cup and the 1960 European Nations' Cup. He earned 9 caps, scoring 2 goals. His last international was a January 1962 match against Egypt.

== Honours ==
- Austrian Football Bundesliga (2):
  - 1958, 1959
