= Vagn Birkeland =

Danish footballer (1926–2022)

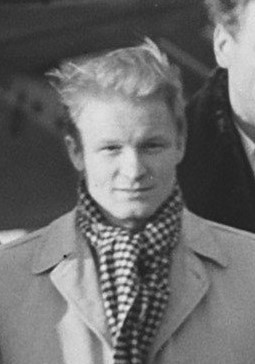
- Birkeland in 1955

Personal information
- Date of birth: 15 March 1926
- Place of birth: Sønderborg, Denmark
- Date of death: 2022
- Place of death: Copenhagen, Denmark
- Position: Forward

Senior career*
Years	Team	Apps	(Gls)
- KB

International career
1954–1955	Denmark	5	(1)
- * Club domestic league appearances and goals

Vagn Birkeland (15 March 1926 – 2022) was a Danish footballer. He played in five matches for the Denmark national football team from 1954 to 1955.
