= 1957–58 Oberliga =

Oberliga
- Season: 1957–58
- Champions: Hamburger SV Tennis Borussia Berlin FC Schalke 04 FK Pirmasens Karlsruher SC
- Relegated: VfB Lübeck Göttingen 05 Minerva 93 Berlin Alemannia 90 Berlin Wuppertaler SV Sportfreunde Hamborn VfR Kaiserslautern SV St. Ingbert Jahn Regensburg Stuttgarter Kickers
- German champions: Schalke 04; 7th German title
- Top goalscorer: Friedel Trapp (28 goals)

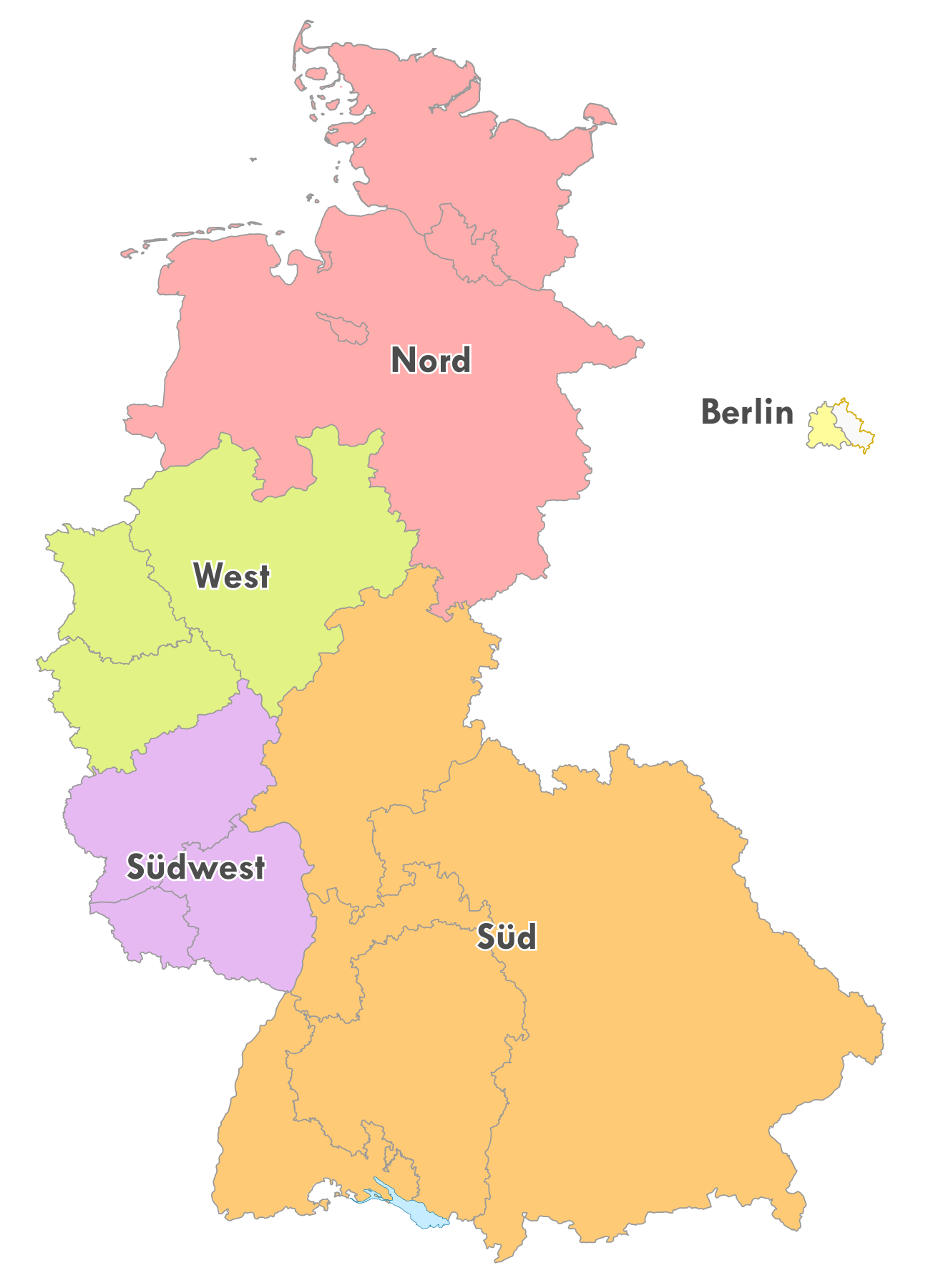
Map of the five German Oberligas 1945 to 1963

The 1957–58 Oberliga was the thirteenth season of the Oberliga, the first tier of the football league system in West Germany. The league operated in five regional divisions, Berlin, North, South, Southwest and West. The five league champions and the runners-up from the west, south, southwest and north then entered the 1959 German football championship which was won by FC Schalke 04. It was Schalke's seventh and last national championship and its first since 1942.

A similar-named league, the DDR-Oberliga, existed in East Germany, set at the first tier of the East German football league system. The 1958 DDR-Oberliga was won by ASK Vorwärts Berlin.

== Oberliga Nord ==
The 1957–58 season saw two new clubs in the league, Phönix Lübeck and VfB Lübeck, both promoted from the Amateurliga. The league's top scorer was Werner Thamm of Eintracht Braunschweig with 23 goals.

Pos	Team	Pld	W	D	L	GF	GA	GD	Pts	Promotion, qualification or relegation
1	Hamburger SV	30	20	3	7	78	35	+43	43	Qualification to German championship
2	Eintracht Braunschweig	30	18	5	7	72	44	+28	41	Qualification to German championship
3	FC Altona 93	30	14	7	9	49	44	+5	35	
4	VfL Osnabrück	30	14	5	11	52	41	+11	33	
5	TuS Bremerhaven 93	30	13	7	10	52	42	+10	33	
6	Concordia Hamburg	30	14	4	12	61	49	+12	32	
7	Werder Bremen	30	14	3	13	76	70	+6	31	
8	Holstein Kiel	30	11	8	11	48	46	+2	30	
9	FC St. Pauli	30	12	5	13	44	51	−7	29	
10	Hannover 96	30	11	5	14	47	46	+1	27	
11	VfL Wolfsburg	30	11	4	15	57	57	0	26	
12	VfR Neumünster	30	8	10	12	33	54	−21	26	
13	Eintracht Nordhorn	30	8	9	13	37	58	−21	25	
14	Phönix Lübeck	30	10	5	15	37	64	−27	25	
15	VfB Lübeck (R)	30	8	8	14	36	57	−21	24	Relegation to Amateurliga
16	Göttingen 05 (R)	30	8	4	18	47	67	−20	20	Relegation to Amateurliga

Source: RSSSF.com
Rules for classification: 1) Points;
(R) Relegated

== Oberliga Berlin ==
The 1957–58 season saw two new clubs in the league, Alemannia 90 Berlin and Wacker 04 Berlin, both promoted from the Amateurliga Berlin. The league's top scorer was Dieter Blümchen of Viktoria 89 Berlin with 19 goals.

Pos	Team	Pld	W	D	L	GF	GA	GD	Pts	Promotion, qualification or relegation
1	Tennis Borussia Berlin	22	13	6	3	54	30	+24	32	Qualification to German championship
2	Viktoria 89 Berlin	22	14	3	5	60	22	+38	31	
3	Spandauer SV	22	12	7	3	43	22	+21	31	
4	Berliner SV 92	22	10	7	5	44	36	+8	27	
5	Tasmania 1900 Berlin	22	8	7	7	27	30	−3	23	
6	Hertha BSC Berlin	22	8	4	10	28	30	−2	20	
7	Hertha Zehlendorf	22	8	4	10	36	41	−5	20	
8	Blau-Weiß 90 Berlin	22	7	5	10	41	47	−6	19	
9	Union 06 Berlin	22	9	1	12	40	54	−14	19	
10	Wacker 04 Berlin	22	5	7	10	41	52	−11	17	
11	Minerva 93 Berlin (R)	22	5	4	13	25	51	−26	14	Relegation to Amateurliga Berlin
12	Alemannia 90 Berlin (R)	22	3	5	14	31	55	−24	11	Relegation to Amateurliga Berlin

Source: RSSSF.com
Rules for classification: 1) Points;
(R) Relegated

== Oberliga West ==
The 1957–58 season saw two new clubs in the league, Sportfreunde Hamborn and Rot-Weiß Oberhausen, both promoted from the 2. Oberliga West. The league's top scorer was Alfred Kelbassa of Borussia Dortmund with 24 goals.

Pos	Team	Pld	W	D	L	GF	GA	GD	Pts	Promotion, qualification or relegation
1	FC Schalke 04 (C)	30	16	9	5	74	36	+38	41	Qualification to German championship
2	1. FC Köln	30	18	4	8	74	45	+29	40	Qualification to German championship
3	Alemannia Aachen	30	15	7	8	47	38	+9	37	
4	Meidericher SV	30	13	10	7	56	37	+19	36	
5	Borussia Dortmund	30	14	7	9	67	44	+23	35	
6	Preußen Münster	30	9	12	9	48	55	−7	30	
7	Rot-Weiß Essen	30	11	8	11	40	42	−2	30	
8	Fortuna Düsseldorf	30	11	7	12	57	58	−1	29	
9	Viktoria Köln	30	11	7	12	57	58	−1	29	
10	Duisburger SV	30	12	5	13	41	48	−7	29	
11	Rot-Weiß Oberhausen	30	10	8	12	45	56	−11	28	
12	Westfalia Herne	30	7	13	10	41	54	−13	27	
13	SV Sodingen	30	7	10	13	44	55	−11	24	
14	VfL Bochum	30	8	8	14	39	62	−23	24	
15	Wuppertaler SV (R)	30	8	7	15	46	50	−4	23	Relegation to 2. Oberliga West
16	Sportfreunde Hamborn (R)	30	5	8	17	29	67	−38	18	Relegation to 2. Oberliga West

Source: RSSSF.com
Rules for classification: 1) Points;
(C) Champions; (R) Relegated

== Oberliga Südwest ==
The 1957–58 season saw two new clubs in the league, SV St. Ingbert and TuRa Ludwigshafen, both promoted from the 2. Oberliga Südwest. The league's top scorer was Friedel Trapp of TuRa Ludwigshafen with 29 goals, the highest total for any scorer in the five Oberligas in 1957–58.

Pos	Team	Pld	W	D	L	GF	GA	GD	Pts	Promotion, qualification or relegation
1	FK Pirmasens	30	18	6	6	63	32	+31	42	Qualification to German championship
2	1. FC Kaiserslautern	30	19	3	8	81	37	+44	41	Qualification to German championship
3	Borussia Neunkirchen	30	19	3	8	67	47	+20	41	
4	Phönix Ludwigshafen	30	14	7	9	61	48	+13	35	
5	Wormatia Worms	30	14	7	9	48	41	+7	35	
6	FSV Mainz 05	30	14	5	11	58	56	+2	33	
7	Eintracht Kreuznach	30	13	5	12	67	54	+13	31	
8	1. FC Saarbrücken	30	14	3	13	65	54	+11	31	
9	Saar 05 Saarbrücken	30	14	3	13	59	56	+3	31	
10	TuRa Ludwigshafen	30	12	3	15	58	63	−5	27	
11	TuS Neuendorf	30	11	4	15	59	60	−1	26	
12	VfR Frankenthal	30	11	4	15	49	57	−8	26	
13	FV Speyer	30	11	3	16	46	59	−13	25	
14	Eintracht Trier	30	8	8	14	39	56	−17	24	
15	VfR Kaiserslautern (R)	30	5	6	19	35	71	−36	16	Relegation to 2. Oberliga Südwest
16	SV St. Ingbert (R)	30	7	2	21	42	106	−64	16	Relegation to 2. Oberliga Südwest

Source: RSSSF.com
Rules for classification: 1) Points;
(R) Relegated

== Oberliga Süd ==
The 1957–58 season saw two new clubs in the league, TSV 1860 München and SSV Reutlingen, both promoted from the 2. Oberliga Süd. The league's top scorer was Siegfried Gast of Kickers Offenbach with 20 goals.

Pos	Team	Pld	W	D	L	GF	GA	GD	Pts	Promotion, qualification or relegation
1	Karlsruher SC	30	19	4	7	60	38	+22	42	Qualification to German championship
2	1. FC Nürnberg	30	19	3	8	74	45	+29	41	Qualification to German championship
3	Eintracht Frankfurt	30	15	9	6	58	32	+26	39	
4	SpVgg Fürth	30	17	5	8	54	33	+21	39	
5	Kickers Offenbach	30	17	3	10	68	45	+23	37	
6	TSV 1860 München	30	14	8	8	50	48	+2	36	
7	FC Bayern Munich	30	12	6	12	66	56	+10	30	
8	FC Schweinfurt 05	30	11	7	12	51	48	+3	29	
9	VfB Stuttgart	30	11	6	13	55	46	+9	28	
10	VfR Mannheim	30	11	5	14	43	57	−14	27	
11	Viktoria Aschaffenburg	30	10	6	14	51	54	−3	26	
12	BC Augsburg	30	8	10	12	45	66	−21	26	
13	FSV Frankfurt	30	9	6	15	33	46	−13	24	
14	SSV Reutlingen	30	9	5	16	41	55	−14	23	
15	Jahn Regensburg (R)	30	5	7	18	29	79	−50	17	Relegation to 2. Oberliga Süd
16	Stuttgarter Kickers (R)	30	4	8	18	31	61	−30	16	Relegation to 2. Oberliga Süd

Source: RSSSF.com
Rules for classification: 1) Points;
(R) Relegated

== German championship ==
The 1958 German football championship was contested by the nine qualified Oberliga teams and won by FC Schalke 04, defeating Hamburger SV in the final. The runners-up of the Oberliga West and Südwest played a pre-qualifying match which had to be replayed as it originally ended in a three-all draw after extra time. The remaining eight clubs then played a single round of matches at neutral grounds in two groups of four. The two group winners then advanced to the final.

=== Qualifying ===
Team 1	Score	Team 2
1. FC Köln	3–3 aet	1. FC Kaiserslautern

Replay

Team 1	Score	Team 2
1. FC Köln	3–0	1. FC Kaiserslautern

=== Group 1 ===
Pos	Team	Pld	W	D	L	GF	GA	GD	Pts	Promotion, qualification or relegation
1	Hamburger SV (Q)	3	3	0	0	8	3	+5	6	Qualified to final
2	1. FC Nürnberg	3	1	1	1	7	8	−1	3	
3	FK Pirmasens	3	0	2	1	4	5	−1	2	
4	1. FC Köln	3	0	1	2	5	8	−3	1	

Source: RSSSF.com
Rules for classification: 1) Points;
(Q) Qualified for the phase indicated

=== Group 2 ===
Pos	Team	Pld	W	D	L	GF	GA	GD	Pts	Promotion, qualification or relegation
1	FC Schalke 04 (Q)	3	3	0	0	16	1	+15	6	Qualified to final
2	Karlsruher SC	3	2	0	1	3	4	−1	4	
3	Eintracht Braunschweig	3	1	0	2	10	9	+1	2	
4	Tennis Borussia Berlin	3	0	0	3	3	18	−15	0	

Source: RSSSF.com
Rules for classification: 1) Points;
(Q) Qualified for the phase indicated

=== Final ===
Team 1	Score	Team 2
FC Schalke 04	3–0	Hamburger SV
