= Klaus Zink =

German footballer (1936–2024)

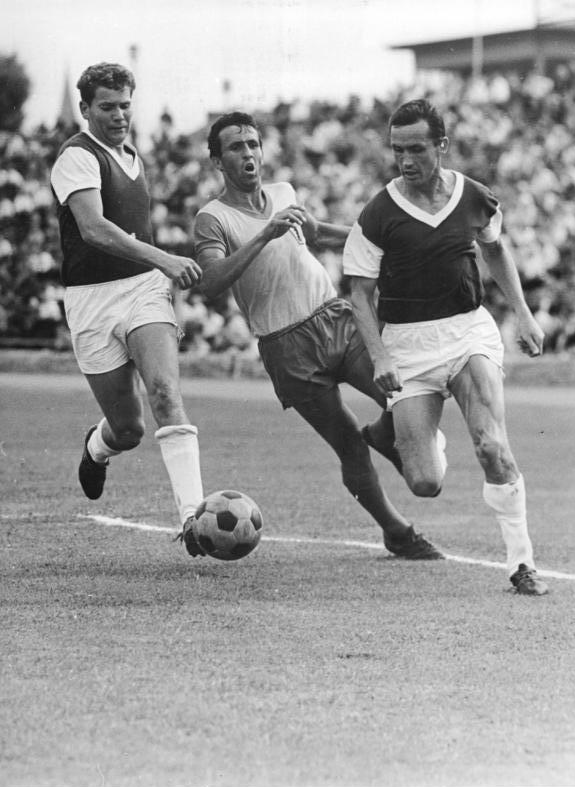
- Zink (right) in 1966

Personal information
- Date of birth: 20 January 1936
- Place of birth: Plauen, Gau Saxony, Germany
- Date of death: 9 February 2024 (aged 88)
- Position: Forward

Senior career*
Years	Team	Apps	(Gls)
1954–1955	BSG Wismut Plauen	2	(0)
1957–1972	Wismut Karl-Marx-Stadt	279	(83)
1971–1972	Wismut Aue II	13	(1)
Total		294	(84)
- * Club domestic league appearances and goals

Klaus Zink (20 January 1936 – 9 February 2024) was a German footballer who played as a forward. Zink died on 9 February 2024, at the age of 88.
