= Günter Siebert (footballer) =

German footballer (1930–2017)

Personal information
- Full name: Günter Siebert
- Date of birth: 15 December 1930
- Place of birth: Kassel, German Empire
- Date of death: 16 June 2017 (aged 86)
- Place of death: Eckernförde, Germany
- Position: Forward

Senior career*
Years	Team	Apps	(Gls)
1955–1959	FC Schalke 04		
- * Club domestic league appearances and goals

Günter Siebert (15 December 1930 – 16 June 2017) was a German footballer who played as a forward.

== Playing career ==
In his second of three spells overall at FC Schalke 04 forward Günter Siebert won the 1958 West German championship with the team.

== Later life ==
After his playing times, he became chairman of Schalke 04 on three occasions. Siebert died in June 2017.
