= Heinz Kördell =

German footballer (1932–2020)

Personal information
- Full name: Heinz Kördell
- Date of birth: 8 January 1932
- Place of birth: Wanne-Eickel, Germany
- Date of death: 2 October 2020 (aged 88)
- Position: Midfielder

Senior career*
Years	Team	Apps	(Gls)
–1956	Röhlinghausen		
1956–1962	Schalke 04		
1962–1964	Schwarz-Weiß Essen		

International career
1958	West Germany	1	(0)
- * Club domestic league appearances and goals

Heinz "Heiner" Kördell (8 January 1932 – 2 October 2020) was a German footballer.

== Career ==
Kördell was the son of a coal miner in Germany's Ruhrgebiet. In 1956, he joined the Schalke team from SpVgg Röhlinghausen. As an offensive midfielder, he was in the team that won for Schalke the (to date) last German championship in 1958. For six years, he played at Schalke, before joining Schwarz-Weiß Essen in 1962. In German Oberliga West (then the highest division in German football) he scored 19 goals in 103 matches. His only match in the black-and-white dress of West Germany came on 28 December 1958, in Cairo, where the Germans faced Egypt.

In 1958, he was German champion with Schalke 04. He played one international match for West Germany. Kördell was a member of the honorary committee of Schalke.

Kördell died on 2 October 2020, aged 88.

== Quote ==
"To us, at the time, "culture" meant having a toilet in your own flat."
