= 1952–53 Eintracht Frankfurt season =

Eintracht Frankfurt
1952–53 season
- Chairman: Anton Keller
- Manager: Kurt Windmann
- Oberliga Süd: 1st / Champions
- DFB-Pokal / SFV-Pokal: Quarter-final (SFV-Pokal)
- Top goalscorer: League: Erich Dziwoki (12); All: Erich Dziwoki (13)
- Highest home attendance: 40,000 8 March 1953 v 1. FC Nürnberg (league)
- Lowest home attendance: 5,000 30 November 1952 v 1. FC Schweinfurt 05 (league)
- Average home league attendance: 16,400

The 1952–53 Eintracht Frankfurt season was the 53rd season in the club's football history. In 1952–53 the club played in the Oberliga Süd, the top tier of German football. It was the club's 8th season in the Oberliga Süd.

The season ended up with Eintracht winning Oberliga Süd for the first time, later losing to Holstein Kiel in the quarter-final in the run for the German championship knockout stage.

== Matches ==
=== Legend ===
Win Draw Loss Postponed

=== Friendlies ===
| 2 August 1952 | Alemannia Aachen (West Germany) | 4–0 | (West Germany) Eintracht Frankfurt |
| | Derwall 2', 60'; Willi Kraus 81', 86' | (Report) | | Attendance: 7,000 |

| 3 August 1952 | SpVgg Griesheim 02 (West Germany) | 0–3 | (West Germany) Eintracht Frankfurt | Frankfurt, West Germany |
| | | (Report) | Dokter 38'; Dziwoki; Mayer 88' (o.g.) | Attendance: 2,500; Referee: Schmitt |

| 9 August 1952 | Rheydter SpV (West Germany) | 2–1 | (West Germany) Eintracht Frankfurt | Rheydt, West Germany |
| | Alexius 36', 56' | (Report) | Ebeling 10' | Attendance: 3,500; Referee: Palmer |

| 10 August 1952 | VfL Neuwied (West Germany) | 3–6 | (West Germany) Eintracht Frankfurt | Neuwied, West Germany |
| | Wagenknecht 72'; Fergen 78'; Böhm 79' | (Report) | Jänisch 8' 70'; Dokter 50'; Ebeling 61'; Pfaff 66' (pen.) |

| 13 August 1952 | Rödelheimer FC 02 (West Germany) | 0–2 | (West Germany) Eintracht Frankfurt | Frankfurt, West Germany |
| | | (Report) | Pfaff 60'; Schieth 89' | Stadium: Rebstöcker Weg |

| 17 August 1952 | Eintracht Frankfurt (West Germany) | 1–4 | Egypt | Frankfurt, West Germany |
| | Schieth 29' | (Report) | Elfar 33'; Hamza 51'; El-Hamouly 55', 88' | Stadium: Riederwaldstadion; Attendance: 20,000; Referee: Fink |

| 5 October 1952 | Eintracht Frankfurt (West Germany) | 2–1 | (West Germany) TuS Neuendorf | Frankfurt, West Germany |
| | Hesse 29'; Ebeling 72' | (Report) | Gauchel 9' | Stadium: Riederwaldstadion; Attendance: 5,000; Referee: Bernbeck |

| 9 November 1952 | Eintracht Frankfurt (West Germany) | 2–1 | (West Germany) Werder Bremen | Frankfurt, West Germany |
| | Ebeling 15' (pen.); Dziwoki 29' | (Report) | Preuße 37' | Stadium: Riederwaldstadion; Attendance: 2,500; Referee: Kühn |

| 19 December 1952 | Cairo Army XI (Egypt) | 1–2 | (West Germany) Eintracht Frankfurt | Cairo, Egypt |
| | del Din 42' | (Report) | Schieth 38'; Jänisch 40' | Attendance: 15,000 |

| 21 December 1952 | Alexandria XI (Egypt) | 0–2 | (West Germany) Eintracht Frankfurt | Egypt |
| | | (Report) | Ebeling 8'; Pfaff 55' | Attendance: 15,000 |

| 26 December 1952 | Cairo XI (Egypt) | 2–2 | (West Germany) Eintracht Frankfurt | Cairo, Egypt |
| | Alea 28'; Alfar 90' (pen.) | (Report) | Ebeling 31'; Pfaff 38' | Attendance: 20,000 |

| 28 December 1952 | Port Said XI (Egypt) | 0–0 | (West Germany) Eintracht Frankfurt | Port Said, Egypt |
| | | (Report) |

| 28 June 1953 | TuS Neuendorf (West Germany) | 3–1 | (West Germany) Eintracht Frankfurt | Koblenz, West Germany |
| | Gauchel 19'; Schmutzler 28'; Boden 63' | (Report) | Weilbächer 13' | Attendance: 2,500; Referee: Dietz |

=== Oberliga ===
==== League fixtures and results ====
| 24 August 1952 1 | Eintracht Frankfurt | 4–1 | SpVgg Fürth | Frankfurt, West Germany |
| | Schieth 8', 31'; Ebeling 60'; Dziwoki 66' | (Report) | Mai 23' | Attendance: 12,000 |

| 31 August 1952 2 | Bayern Munich | 3–1 | Eintracht Frankfurt | Munich, West Germany |
| | Bauer 19'; Mayer 78'; Seemann 85' | (Report) | Jänisch 58' | Attendance: 15,000; Referee: Eberle |

| 7 September 1952 3 | Eintracht Frankfurt | 3–0 | SV Waldhof | Frankfurt, West Germany |
| | Dokter 20'; Dziwoki 28', 42' | (Report) | | Attendance: 6,000; Referee: Loch |

| 14 September 1952 4 | BC Augsburg | 1–5 | Eintracht Frankfurt |
| | Bachl 16' | (Report) | Müller 18' (o.g.); Dziwoki 60'; Heilig 64'; Schieth 68'; Kaster 85' | Attendance: 15,000; Referee: Reinhardt |

| 21 September 1952 5 | Eintracht Frankfurt | 5–3 | TSG Ulm 1846 | Frankfurt, West Germany |
| | Dokter 53', 68'; Heilig 58'; Pfaff 72', 87' | (Report) | Schlumberger 15'; Elzner 32'; Gauß 75' | Stadium: Riederwaldstadion; Attendance: 6,000; Referee: Kandelbinder |

| 28 September 1952 6 | FSV Frankfurt | 1–3 | Eintracht Frankfurt | Frankfurt, West Germany |
| | Ruppel 60' | (Report) | Dziwoki 13', 88'; Dokter 86' | Stadium: Riederwaldstadion; Attendance: 28,000; Referee: Schmetzer |

| 12 October 1952 7 | Eintracht Frankfurt | 4–4 | Viktoria Aschaffenburg | Frankfurt, West Germany |
| | Pfaff 31', 33'; Dziwoki 70'; Ebeling 87' | (Report) | Schiele 14'; Budion 32'; Staab 45'; Jekat 65' | Stadium: Riederwaldstadion; Attendance: 18,000; Referee: Jakobi |

| 19 October 1952 8 | Stuttgarter Kickers | 1–2 | Eintracht Frankfurt | Stuttgart, West Germany |
| | Schumacher 71' | (Report) | Heilig 43'; Hesse 61' | Stadium: Kickers-Stadion; Attendance: 15,000; Referee: Meißner |

| 25 October 1952 9 | VfR Mannheim | 1–1 | Eintracht Frankfurt | Mannheim, West Germany |
| | Langlotz 51' | (Report) | Dziwoki 78' | Stadium: Stadion an den Brauereien; Attendance: 13,000; Referee: Ruhmann |

| 2 November 1952 10 | Eintracht Frankfurt | 1–0 | TSV 1860 München | Frankfurt, West Germany |
| | Dokter 87' | (Report) | | Stadium: Riederwaldstadion; Attendance: 8,000; Referee: Kühn |

| 16 November 1952 11 | Eintracht Frankfurt | 1–0 | Kickers Offenbach | Frankfurt, West Germany |
| 14:30 CEST | Hesse 34' | (Report) | | Stadium: Riederwaldstadion; Attendance: 35,000; Referee: Reinhardt |

| 23 November 1952 12 | 1. FC Nürnberg | 2–2 | Eintracht Frankfurt | Nuremberg, West Germany |
| | Morlock 15'; Glomb 51' | (Report) | Hesse 7'; Dziwoki 85' | Attendance: 24,000; Referee: Schmetzer |

| 30 November 1952 13 | Eintracht Frankfurt | 1–1 | 1. FC Schweinfurt 05 | Frankfurt, West Germany |
| | Schieth 85' | (Report) | Burkhardt 73' | Stadium: Riederwaldstadion; Attendance: 5,000; Referee: Fiershauser |

| 7 December 1952 14 | Karlsruher SC | 1–1 | Eintracht Frankfurt | Karlsruhe, West Germany |
| | Beck 41' | (Report) | Dziwoki 30' | Attendance: 12,000; Referee: Meißner |

| 31 December 1952 15 | Eintracht Frankfurt | 1–0 | VfB Stuttgart | Frankfurt, West Germany |
| | Ebeling 19' | (Report) | | Stadium: Riederwaldstadion; Attendance: 25,000; Referee: Jakobi |

| 4 January 1953 16 | SpVgg Fürth | 3–0 | Eintracht Frankfurt |
| | Schade 22', 44'; Brenzke 73' | (Report) | | Attendance: 14,000; Referee: Kühne |

| 11 January 1953 17 | Eintracht Frankfurt | 2–1 | Bayern Munich | Frankfurt, West Germany |
| | Pfaff 34'; Jänisch 57' | (Report) | Bauer 5' | Stadium: Riederwaldstadion; Attendance: 10,000; Referee: Stoll |

| 18 January 1953 18 | SV Waldhof | 5–2 | Eintracht Frankfurt |
| | Gärtner 7'; Lipponer 20' (pen.); Heim 27'; Cornelius 45', 80' | (Report) | Ebeling 38'; Schwan 88' | Attendance: 9,000; Referee: Meißner |

| 25 January 1953 19 | Eintracht Frankfurt | 3–1 | BC Augsburg | Frankfurt, West Germany |
| | Schieth 40'; Ebeling 80', 86' | (Report) | Biesinger 75' | Stadium: Riederwaldstadion; Attendance: 8,000; Referee: Tischler |

| 1 February 1953 20 | TSG Ulm 1846 | 3–1 | Eintracht Frankfurt | Ulm, West Germany |
| | Ruoff 35'; Elzner 80', 82' | (Report) | Pfaff 57' | Stadium: Donaustadion; Attendance: 4,500; Referee: Lehmann |

| 8 February 1953 21 | Eintracht Frankfurt | 1–1 | FSV Frankfurt | Frankfurt, West Germany |
| | Jänisch 29' | (Report) | Herrmann 24' | Stadium: Riederwaldstadion; Attendance: 15,000; Referee: Reinhardt |

| 15 February 1953 22 | Viktoria Aschaffenburg | 1–2 | Eintracht Frankfurt |
| | Schmitt 90' | (Report) | Pfaff 40' (pen.); Dziwoki 61' | Attendance: 15,000; Referee: Jakobi |

| 22 February 1953 23 | Eintracht Frankfurt | 3–1 | Stuttgarter Kickers | Frankfurt, West Germany |
| | Pfaff 39'; Schieth 48', 75' | (Report) | Dreher 70' | Stadium: Riederwaldstadion; Attendance: 10,000; Referee: Winkler |

| 1 March 1953 24 | Eintracht Frankfurt | 4–0 | VfR Mannheim | Frankfurt, West Germany |
| | Jänisch 25', 43'; Ebeling 41', 58' | (Report) | | Stadium: Riederwaldstadion; Attendance: 12,000; Referee: Loch |

| 8 March 1953 25 | Eintracht Frankfurt | 4–0 | 1. FC Nürnberg | Frankfurt, West Germany |
| | Ebeling 53', 68'; Pfaff 79'; Dziwoki 87' | (Report) | | Stadium: Riederwaldstadion; Attendance: 40,000; Referee: Baumgart |

| 15 March 1953 26 | TSV 1860 München | 1–1 | Eintracht Frankfurt | Munich, West Germany |
| | Mondschein 42' | (Report) | Heilig 80' | Attendance: 25,000; Referee: Reinhardt |

| 29 March 1953 27 | Kickers Offenbach | 2–0 | Eintracht Frankfurt | Offenbach, West Germany |
| | Kraus 43'; Baas 62' (pen.) | (Report) | | Stadium: Stadion am Bieberer Berg; Attendance: 30,000; Referee: Eberle |

| 12 April 1953 28 | 1. FC Schweinfurt 05 | 3–0 | Eintracht Frankfurt |
| | Burkhardt 28'; Lang 40'; Aumeier 46' | (Report) | | Attendance: 12,000; Referee: Jakobi |

| 18 April 1953 29 | Eintracht Frankfurt | 4–1 | Karlsruher SC | Frankfurt, West Germany |
| | Pfaff 2'; Schieth 53', 75', 77' | (Report) | Kunkel 67' | Stadium: Riederwaldstadion; Attendance: 36,000; Referee: Kandelbinder |

| 26 April 1953 30 | VfB Stuttgart | 7–0 | Eintracht Frankfurt | Stuttgart, West Germany |
| | Blessing 3'; Krieger 7'; Baitinger 8', 40', 50', 83'; Waldner 37' | (Report) | | Stadium: Neckarstadion; Attendance: 30,000; Referee: Meißner |

==== League table ====
| Position | Team | Played | Goals | Points |
|---|---|---|---|---|
| 1. | Eintracht Frankfurt | 30 | 62-49 | 39-21 |
| 2. | VfB Stuttgart (C) | 30 | 69-33 | 38-22 |
| 3. | SpVgg Fürth | 30 | 65-45 | 35-25 |
| 4. | Karlsruher SC | 30 | 68-52 | 34-26 |
| 5. | 1. FC Schweinfurt 05 | 30 | 40-51 | 32-28 |
| 6. | Kickers Offenbach | 30 | 61-53 | 30-30 |
| 7. | FC Bayern Munich | 30 | 59:56 | 30:30 |
| 8. | 1. FC Nürnberg | 30 | 67-61 | 29-31 |
| 9. | SV Waldhof | 30 | 56-62 | 29-31 |
| 10. | BC Augsburg (P) | 30 | 59-61 | 28-32 |
| 11. | FSV Frankfurt | 30 | 38-44 | 28-32 |
| 12. | Viktoria Aschaffenburg | 30 | 59-74 | 28-32 |
| 13. | VfR Mannheim | 30 | 46-59 | 27-33 |
| 14. | Stuttgarter Kickers | 30 | 65-69 | 26-34 |
| 15. | TSV 1860 München | 30 | 46-58 | 24-36 |
| 16. | TSG Ulm 1846 (P) | 30 | 41-74 | 21-39 |

| | Participation at the 1953 German football championship round |
| | Relegated to 1953–54 2. Oberliga Süd |
| (C) | 1951–52 Oberliga Süd champions |
| (P) | Promoted from 1951–52 2. Oberliga |

=== Championship round ===
| Pos | Team | Pld | W | D | L | GF | GA | GR | Pts | Qualification | FCK | SGE | KOE | KSV |
|---|---|---|---|---|---|---|---|---|---|---|---|---|---|---|
| 1 | 1. FC Kaiserslautern | 6 | 5 | 1 | 0 | 16 | 7 | 2.286 | 11 | Advance to final | — | 5–1 | 2–2 | 2–1 |
| 2 | Eintracht Frankfurt | 6 | 3 | 1 | 2 | 8 | 7 | 1.143 | 7 | | 0–1 | — | 2–0 | 4–1 |
| 3 | 1. FC Köln | 6 | 1 | 3 | 2 | 8 | 10 | 0.800 | 5 | | 1–2 | 0–0 | — | 3–2 |
| 4 | Holstein Kiel | 6 | 0 | 1 | 5 | 8 | 16 | 0.500 | 1 | | 2–4 | 0–1 | 2–2 | — |

Source: RSSSF
Rules for classification: 1) Points; 2) Goal ratio.

| 3 May 1953 1 | Eintracht Frankfurt | 2–0 | 1. FC Köln | Frankfurt, West Germany |
| | Dziwoki 1'; Hesse 39' | (Report) | | Stadium: Waldstadion; Attendance: 50,000; Referee: Herden |

| 10 May 1953 2 | Holstein Kiel | 0–1 | Eintracht Frankfurt | Kiel, West Germany |
| | | (Report) | Schieth 87' | Attendance: 28,000; Referee: Ternieden |

| 17 May 1953 3 | Eintracht Frankfurt | 0–1 | 1. FC Kaiserslautern | Frankfurt, West Germany |
| 15:00 CEST | | (Report) | O Walter 64' | Stadium: Waldstadion; Attendance: 68,000; Referee: Nettekoven |

| 24 March 1953 4 | 1. FC Kaiserslautern | 5–1 | Eintracht Frankfurt | Ludwigshafen, West Germany |
| | Wenzel 10', 18'; O Walter 12', 19', 86' | (Report) | Wloka 89' | Stadium: Südweststadion; Attendance: 40,000; Referee: Ternieden |

| 31 May 1953 5 | Eintracht Frankfurt | 4–1 | Holstein Kiel | Frankfurt, West Germany |
| | Hesse 13', 57'; Pfaff 65'; Schwan 76' | (Report) | Maier 31' | Stadium: Waldstadion; Attendance: 8,000; Referee: Wershoven |

| 7 June 1953 6 | 1. FC Köln | 0–0 | Eintracht Frankfurt | Cologne, West Germany |
| | | (Report) | | Attendance: 20,000; Referee: Zimmermann |

=== DFB-Pokal / SFV-Pokal ===
| 14 June 1953 Quarter-final | Stuttgarter Kickers | 3–0 | Eintracht Frankfurt | Stuttgart, West Germany |
| | Dreher | (Report) | | Stadium: Kickers-Stadion; Attendance: 5,000 |

== Squad ==
=== Squad and statistics ===
| No. | Pos | Nat | Player | Total | | Oberliga | | Championship round | | DFB-Pokal/SFV-Pokal | |
| No. | Pos | Nat | Player | Apps | Goals | Apps | Goals | Apps | Goals | Apps | Goals |
|---|---|---|---|---|---|---|---|---|---|---|---|
| | GK | (West Germany) FRG | Helmut Henig | 36 | 0 | 30 | 0 | 6 | 0 | 0 | 0 |
| | GK | (West Germany) FRG | Alexander Rothuber | 1 | 0 | 0 | 0 | 0 | 0 | 1 | 0 |
| | DF | (West Germany) FRG | Adolf Bechtold | 37 | 0 | 30 | 0 | 6 | 0 | 1 | 0 |
| | DF | (West Germany) FRG | Heinz Kaster | 20 | 1 | 17 | 1 | 2 | 0 | 1 | 0 |
| | DF | (West Germany) FRG | Ernst Kudrass | 35 | 0 | 28 | 0 | 6 | 0 | 1 | 0 |
| | MF | (West Germany) FRG | Werner Heilig | 36 | 4 | 30 | 4 | 6 | 0 | 0 | 0 |
| | MF | (West Germany) FRG | Klaus Jäckel | 1 | 0 | 0 | 0 | 0 | 0 | 1 | 0 |
| | MF | (West Germany) FRG | Karlheinz Kirchheim | 3 | 0 | 2 | 0 | 0 | 0 | 1 | 0 |
| | MF | (West Germany) FRG | Kurt Krömmelbein | 29 | 0 | 22 | 0 | 6 | 0 | 1 | 0 |
| | MF | (West Germany) FRG | Hans Wloka | 31 | 1 | 26 | 0 | 5 | 1 | 0 | 0 |
| | FW | (West Germany) FRG | Horst Bayer | 1 | 0 | 0 | 0 | 0 | 0 | 1 | 0 |
| | FW | (West Germany) FRG | Heinz Dokter | 22 | 5 | 22 | 5 | 0 | 0 | 0 | 0 |
| | FW | (West Germany) FRG | Erich Dziwoki | 27 | 13 | 21 | 12 | 6 | 1 | 0 | 0 |
| | FW | (West Germany) FRG | Erich Ebeling | 31 | 10 | 24 | 10 | 6 | 0 | 1 | 0 |
| | FW | (West Germany) FRG | Erich Geier | 3 | 0 | 3 | 0 | 0 | 0 | 0 | 0 |
| | FW | (West Germany) FRG | Hermann Hesse | 17 | 6 | 10 | 3 | 6 | 3 | 1 | 0 |
| | FW | (West Germany) FRG | Joachim Jänisch | 13 | 5 | 12 | 5 | 0 | 0 | 1 | 0 |
| | FW | (West Germany) FRG | Alfred Pfaff | 33 | 11 | 27 | 10 | 6 | 1 | 0 | 0 |
| | FW | (West Germany) FRG | Friedel Reichert | 2 | 0 | 2 | 0 | 0 | 0 | 0 | 0 |
| | FW | (West Germany) FRG | Hubert Schieth | 26 | 11 | 22 | 10 | 4 | 1 | 0 | 0 |
| | FW | (West Germany) FRG | Egon Schwan | 3 | 2 | 2 | 1 | 1 | 1 | 0 | 0 |

=== Transfers ===
In:

| No. | Pos. | Nation | Player |
|---|---|---|---|
| — | FW | (West Germany) FRG | Horst Bayer (from Eintracht Frankfurt Academy) |
| — | FW | (West Germany) FRG | Heinz Dokter (from Rheydter SV) |
| — | FW | (West Germany) FRG | Erich Dziwoki (from Alemannia Aachen) |
| — | FW | (West Germany) FRG | Erich Ebeling (from Hamburger SV) |
| — | MF | (West Germany) FRG | Klaus Jäckel (from Eintracht Frankfurt Academy) |

Out:

| No. | Pos. | Nation | Player |
|---|---|---|---|
| — | FW | (West Germany) FRG | Ludwig Kolb (to Hanau 93) |
| — | FW | (West Germany) FRG | Alfred Kraus (retired) |
| — | MF | (West Germany) FRG | Willi Kraus (to Alemannia Aachen) |
| — | FW | (West Germany) FRG | Otto Tempel (to Göttingen 05) |

== See also ==
- 1953 German football championship

== Sources ==
- Matheja, Ulrich (2011). Unsere Eintracht - Eintracht Frankfurt - Die Chronik. Die Werkstatt. ISBN 978-3-89533-750-5.
