= List of Eintracht Frankfurt players =

This is a list of former and current Eintracht Frankfurt players. Note:Career dates include first team years only.

Appearances and goals also include league, national cup and European matches and goals.

Current players are in bold typeface.

As of 21 June 2026

This is a list of notable footballers who have played for Eintracht Frankfurt from the formation of the club in 1899 to present. It generally includes only players who made more than 100 league appearances for the club, but some players with fewer than 100 appearances are also included. This includes players who have set a club record, such as most appearances, most goals, biggest transfer fee, honorary captains or honorary club members.

== Notable players ==
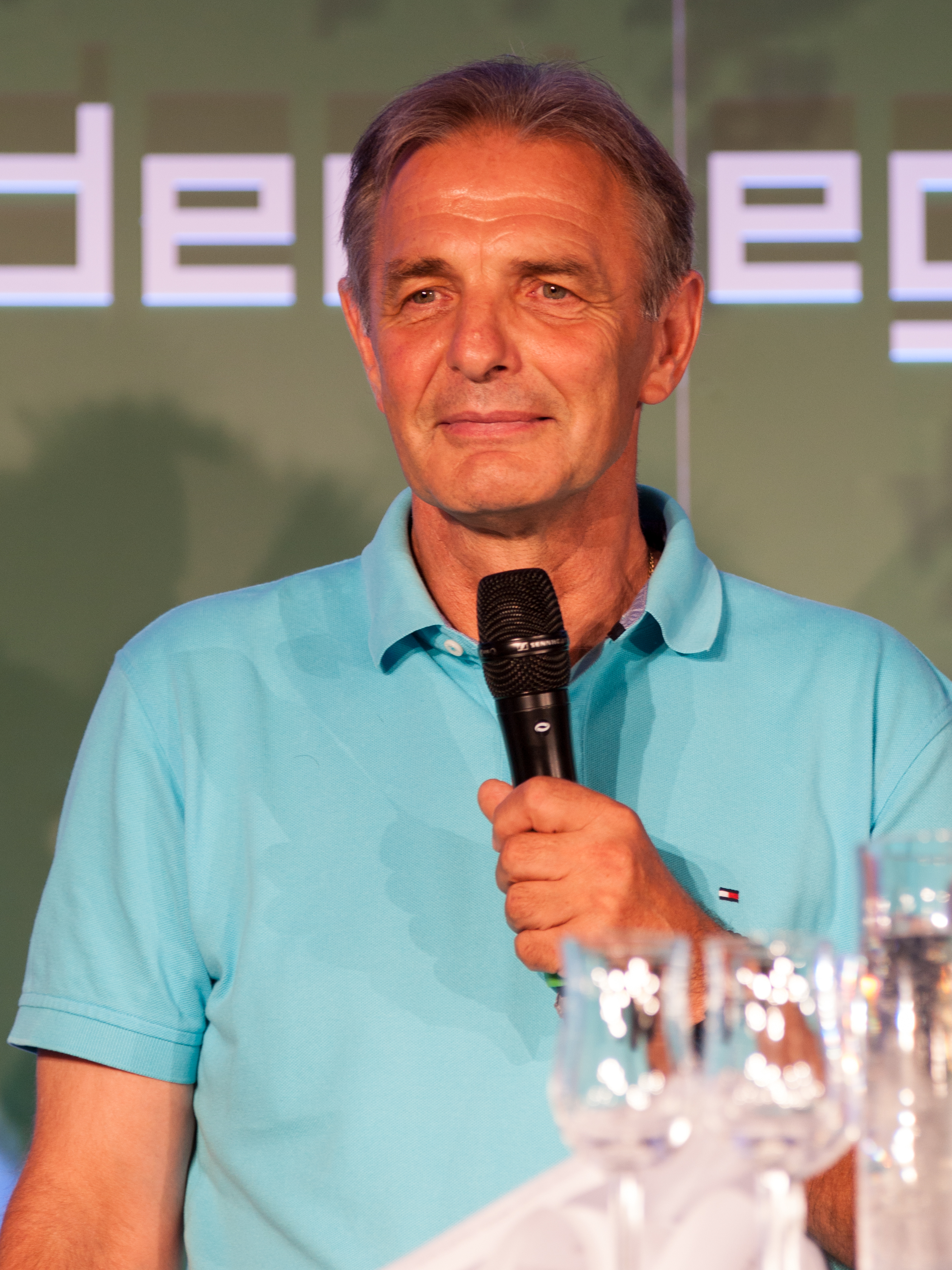
Charly Körbel gained by far the most club appearances and holds a couple of other records

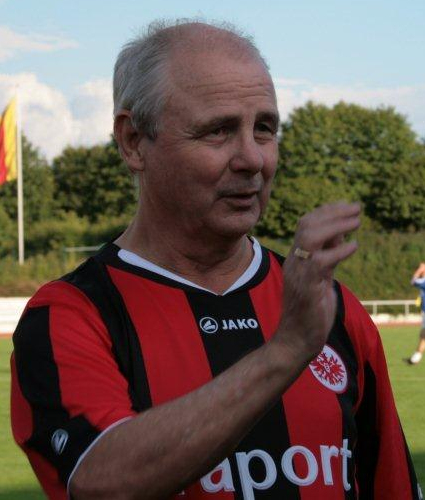
World Cup winner Bernd Hölzenbein scored the most Bundesliga goals in the history for Eintracht Frankfurt

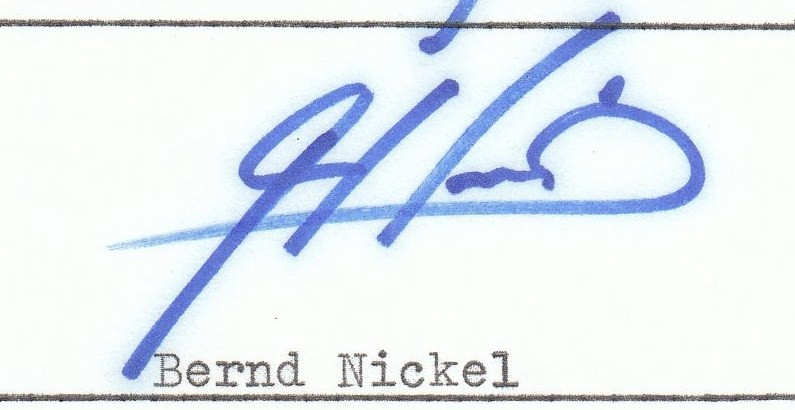
Bernd Nickel is the midfielder with the most goals in Bundesliga history.

Players who represented their country while at the club.
Player won a major trophy as a starter at his stint at Eintracht.
Club record holder.

Bold type indicates that the player currently plays for the club.

As of 21 June 2026

Name	Nationality	Position (Note: Key to positions: GK — Goalkeeper; DF — Defender; MF — Midfielder; FW — Forward)	Eintracht career	Competitive appearances	Competitive goals	Notes	Ref
Charly Körbel	Germany	DF	1972–1991	728	51		
Jürgen Grabowski	Germany	FW	1965–1980	536	140		
Bernd Nickel	Germany	MF	1967–1983	528	175		
Bernd Hölzenbein	Germany	FW	1967–1981	516	207		
Uwe Bindewald	Germany	DF	1988–2004	442	9		
Adolf Bechtold	Germany	DF	1942–1960	433	3		
Dieter Lindner	Germany	MF	1956–1971	416	72		
Oka Nikolov	North Macedonia	GK	1995–2013	415	0		
Manfred Binz	Germany	DF	1985–1996	411	38		
Werner Heilig	Germany	MF	1939–1957	397	58		
Friedel Lutz	Germany	DF	1957–1966; 1967–1973	390	9		
Ralf Falkenmayer	Germany	MF	1980–1987; 1989–1996	385	35		
Kevin Trapp	Germany	GK	2012–2015; 2018–2025	383	0		
Alexander Meier	Germany	MF	2004–2018	379	137		
Hermann Höfer	Germany	DF	1953–1967	371	20		
Lothar Schämer	Germany	DF	1960–1973	362	78		
Richard Kress	Germany	FW	1953–1964	360	96		
Alfred Pfaff	Germany	MF	1949–1961	358	136		
Willi Neuberger	Germany	DF	1974–1983	349	29		
Egon Loy	Germany	GK	1954–1967	346	0		
Marco Russ	Germany	DF	2004–2011; 2013–2020	328	24		
Dietmar Roth	Germany	DF	1987–1997	325	5		
Hans Weilbächer	Germany	MF	1952–1965	308	68		
Makoto Hasebe	Japan	MF	2014–2024	304	2		
Peter Reichel	Germany	DF	1970–1979	281	12		
Peter Kunter	Germany	GK	1965–1977	276	0		
Sebastian Rode	Germany	MF	2010–2014; 2019–2024	276	15		
Uli Stein	Germany	GK	1987–1994	276	0		
Gert Trinklein	Germany	DF	1968–1978	269	12		
Helmut Henig	Germany	GK	1939–1945; 1945; 1947–1954; 1957–1959	265	0		
Ralf Weber	Germany	MF	1989–2001	263	32		
Wilhelm Huberts	Austria	MF	1963–1970	262	89		
Ernst Kudrass	Germany	DF	1948–1962	262	4		
Benjamin Köhler	Germany	MF	2004–2013	257	33		
Roland Weidle	Germany	MF	1971–1978	253	26		
Alexander Schur	Germany	MF	1995–2006	251	23		
Eberhard Schymik	Germany	DF	1955–1964	236	16		
Wolfgang Solz	Germany	FW	1959–1968	236	87		
Adam Schmitt	Germany	FW	1935–1949	233	138		
Wolfgang Kraus	Germany	MF	1971–1979; 1986–1987	231	45		
Ralf Sievers	Germany	MF	1982–1990	230	12		
Patrick Ochs	Germany	DF	2004–2011	227	8		
Karl Ehmer	Germany	FW	1927–1938	222	225		
Hans Wloka	Germany	DF	1948–1957	222	6		
Franz Schütz	Germany	DF	1925–1934	221	4		
Jürgen Kalb	Germany	MF	1968–1975	216	28		
Walter Dietrich	Switzerland	FW	1925–1938	211	68		
Hans Stubb	Germany	DF	1928–1944	211	11		
Ronny Borchers	Germany	MF	1975–1984	209	33		
Rudolf Gramlich	Germany	MF	1929–1939; 1943–1944	208	16		
Dieter Stinka	Germany	MF	1958–1966	204	32		
Erwin Stein	Germany	FW	1959–1966	200	138		
**Timothy Chandler**	United States	DF	2014–	199	10		
Tuta	Brazil	DF	2019; 2020–2025	187	10		
Hugo Mantel	Germany	MF	1928–1934; 1934–1938	185	3		
Evan Ndicka	France	FW	2018–2023	183	12		
Uwe Bein	Germany	MF	1989–1994	182	47		
Willi Pfeiffer	Germany	FW	1910–1922; 1922–1932	181	42		
Bruno Pezzey	Austria	DF	1978–1983	181	38		
Helmut Müller	Germany	MF	1973–1982	180	6		
Fritz Schaller	Germany	FW	1925–1933	180	101		
Daichi Kamada	Japan	MF	2017–2018; 2019–2023	179	40		
David Abraham	Argentina	DF	2015–2021	178	5		
Jürgen Pahl	Germany	GK	1976–1987	177	0		
Bernhard Leis	Germany	MF	1929–1937	176	19		
**Ansgar Knauff**	Germany	MF	2022–	174	25		
Werner Lorant	Germany	MF	1978–1982	173	29		
Filip Kostić	Serbia	MF	2018–2022	172	33		
Karl-Heinz Wirth	Germany	DF	1965–1973	170	1		
Bernhard Kellerhoff	Germany	FW	1926–1932	168	32		
Bastian Oczipka	Germany	DF	2012–2017	167	2		
Rüdiger Wenzel	Germany	FW	1975–1979	166	68		
Sebastian Jung	Germany	DF	2009–2014	164	5		
Norbert Nachtweih	Germany	MF	1976–1982; 1991	164	31		
August Möbs	Germany	FW	1930–1939	163	92		
Slobodan Komljenović	FR Yugoslavia	DF	1992–1997	160	6		
Djibril Sow	Switzerland	MF	2019–2023	160	8		
Stefan Studer	Germany	MF	1988–1993	160	10		
Ioannis Amanatidis	Greece	FW	2004; 2005–2011	158	49		
Thomas Rohrbach	Germany	MF	1970–1975	158	22		
Chris	Brazil	DF	2003–2011	157	13		
Mijat Gaćinović	Serbia	MF	2015–2020	157	10		
Tony Yeboah	Ghana	FW	1990–1995	156	89		
Bum-kun Cha	South Korea	FW	1979–1983	156	58		
Mario Götze	Germany	FW	2022–	151	12		
Ludwig Schmitt	Germany	GK	1930–1938	151	0		
Albert Wirsching	Germany	FW	1936–1948	150	89		
Christoph Spycher	Switzerland	DF	2005–2010	149	1		
Pirmin Schwegler	Switzerland	MF	2009–2014	141	7		
Mirko Dickhaut	Germany	MF	1993–1997	141	12		
Christoph Preuß	Germany	MF	2000–2004; 2005–2010	141	10		
Uwe Müller	Germany	MF	1982–1988	140	22		
Peter Blusch	Germany	DF	1964–1968	139	6		
Martin Hinteregger	Austria	DF	2019–2022	138	14		
Stefan Aigner	Germany	MF	2012–2016	136	28		
Andreas Möller	Germany	MF	1985–1987; 1990–1992; 2003–2004	136	40		
Willy Trumpp	Germany	GK	1923–1930	136	0		
Alexander Kutschera	Germany	DF	1997–2001	135	3		
Erich Bäumler	Germany	FW	1954–1960	133	57		
Armin Kraaz	Germany	DF	1983–1988	133	3		
Hans-Walter Eigenbrodt	Germany	DF	1955–1964	132	4		
Oskar Lotz	Germany	FW	1965–1969	130	28		
Danny da Costa	Germany	DF	2017–2021; 2021–2022	129	9		
Fahrudin Jusufi	Yugoslavia	DF	1966–1970	129	2		
**Robin Koch**	Germany	DF	2024–	127	10		
Janusz Turowski	Poland	FW	1986–1991	127	31		
Ludwig Kolb	Germany	DF	1938–1952	124	0		
Thomas Berthold	Germany	DF	1982–1987	121	18		
Stefan Lottermann	Germany	MF	1979–1983	121	20		
Michael Sziedat	Germany	DF	1980–1984	121	4		
Horst Heese	Germany	FW	1969–1972	120	30		
Bruno Goldammer	Germany	DF	1926–1933	120	9		
Jürgen Friedrich	Germany	MF	1963–1968	119	21		
**Hugo Larsson**	Sweden	MF	2023–	119	10		
Aleksandar Vasoski	North Macedonia	MF	2005–2011	119	5		
Marco Gebhardt	Germany	MF	1997–2002	119	12		
Adolf Schmidt	Germany	MF	1938–1948	118	18		
**Ellyes Skhiri**	Tunisia	MF	2023–	117	7		
Carlos Zambrano	Peru	DF	2012–2016	117	0		
Heinz-Josef Koitka	Germany	GK	1976–1979	117	0		
Lukáš Hrádecký	Finland	GK	2015–2018	116	0		
Jay-Jay Okocha	Nigeria	MF	1992–1996	116	25		
Jørn Andersen	Norway	FW	1988–1990; 1991–1994	115	39		
Theodor Trumpler	Germany	FW	1929–1936; 1941–1942	114	31		
**Farès Chaïbi**	Algeria	MF	2023–	113	9		
Petar Hubchev	Bulgaria	DF	1996–2001	111	2		
Heinz Gründel	Germany	MF	1988–1993	110	11		
Heinz Kaster	Germany	DF	1949–1954	108	2		
Anderson Bamba	Brazil	DF	2011–2017	107	1		
Hubert Schieth	Germany	FW	1949–1953	107	46		
Albert Streit	Germany	MF	2001–2003; 2006–2007	107	8		
Rudi Bommer	Germany	MF	1992–1997	106	5		
Alfred Kraus	Germany	FW	1935–1947; 1949–1952	106	103		
Markus Pröll	Germany	GK	2003–2010	105	0		
Rolf-Christel Guié-Mien	Republic of the Congo	MF	1999–2002	104	21		
Thomas Sobotzik	Germany	MF	1994–1995; 1997–1999; 1999–2001	104	26		
Willi Kraus	Germany	FW	1946–1952	101	43		
Ante Rebić	Croatia	FW	2016–2019	101	25		
Jan Svensson	Sweden	MF	1983–1986	101	18		
Michael Fink	Germany	MF	2006–2009	100	9		
Erwin Schädler	Germany	MF	1940–1948; 1949–1950	100	9		
Fritz Kübert	Germany	DF	1925–1930	99	3		
Helmut Kraus	Germany	FW	1963–1969	94	11		
Eckehard Feigenspan	Germany	FW	1955–1959	93	70		
Luka Jović	Serbia	FW	2017–2019; 2021	93	40		
Rafael Santos Borré	Colombia	FW	2021–2023	92	15		
Karl Jockel	Germany	MF	1907; 1911–1921	92	11		
Fritz Becker	Germany	FW	1904–1921	91	7		
Günter Wienhold	Germany	GK	1972–1978	91	0		
Walter Bechtold	Germany	MF	1965–1969	90	37		
Klaus Beverungen	Germany	MF	1974–1977	87	25		
Friedrich Claus	Germany	DF	1910–1914	87	0		
Almamy Touré	Mali	DF	2019–2023	81	3		
Jesper Lindstrøm	Denmark	MF	2021–2023	80	14		
István Sztáni	Hungary	FW	1957–1959; 1965–1968	80	35		
Sébastien Haller	Ivory Coast	FW	2017–2019	77	33		
Włodzimierz Smolarek	Poland	FW	1986–1988	72	16		
André Silva	Portugal	FW	2019–2021	71	45		
Wolfgang Trapp	Germany	MF	1977–1981	71	1		
Jonathan de Guzmán	Netherlands	MF	2017–2020	68	4		
Emil Schneider	Germany	MF	1913–1925	68	3		
Jetro Willems	Netherlands	DF	2017–2019; 2020–2021	65	0		
Thomas Klepper	Germany	DF	1987–1990	62	2		
Frank Schulz	Germany	MF	1987–1989	60	14		
Randal Kolo Muani	France	FW	2022–2023	50	26		
Holger Friz	Germany	FW	1984–1986; 1987–1988	45	8		
Omar Mascarell	Equatorial Guinea	MF	2016–2018	45	2		
Harald Karger	Germany	FW	1979–1983	43	16		
Bernd Lorenz	Germany	FW	1974–1976	43	17		
Dieter Schlindwein	Germany	DF	1987–1989	42	1		
Wilhelm Gmelin	Germany	GK	1911–1922	41	0		
Lajos Détári	Hungary	MF	1987–1988	39	14		
Marius Wolf	Germany	MF	2017–2018	38	6		
Kevin-Prince Boateng	Ghana	MF	2017–2018	36	6		
Siegfried Bronnert	Germany	FW	1966–1968	33	18		
Carlos Salcedo	Mexico	DF	2017–2018	32	0		
Paul Imke	Germany	FW	1919–1922; 1924–1925	31	19		
Fred Schaub	Germany	FW	1978–1980	27	4		
Ernst Abbé	Germany	FW	1966–1969	24	7		
Michael Kostner	Germany	DF	1987–1989	19	0		
Horst Ehrmantraut	Germany	DF	1979–1980	18	0		
Jürgen Friedl	Germany	GK	–1979	5	0		

== International players ==
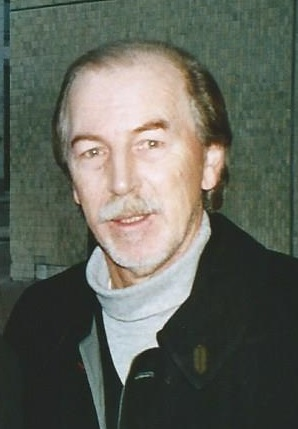
Jürgen Grabowski won the World Cup in 1974

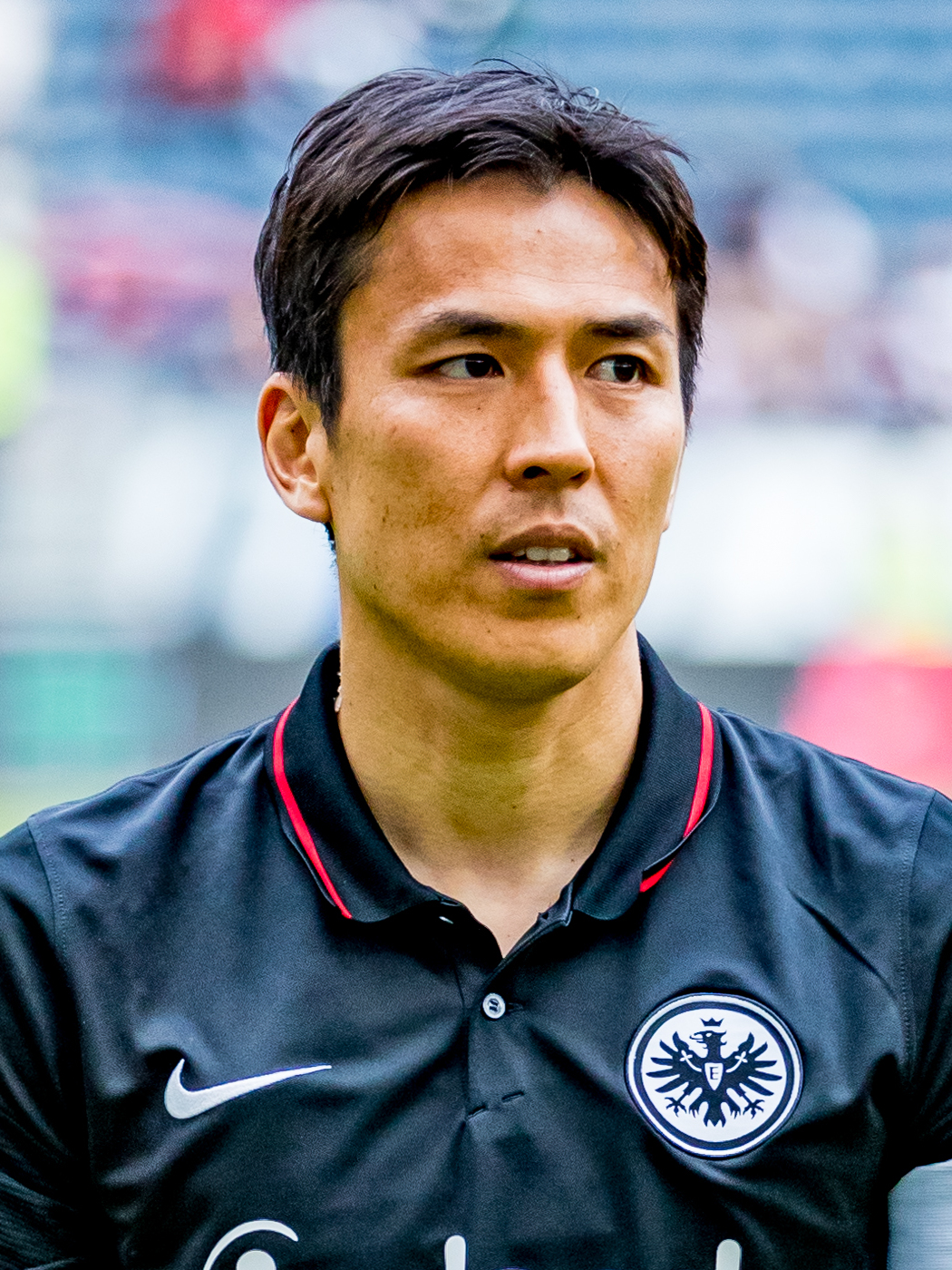
Makoto Hasebe

This is a list of Eintracht Frankfurt players who have been capped at full international level by their country whilst at the club.

Jürgen Grabowski played the most caps while an Eintracht player, with 44 for West Germany.

Makoto Hasebe played the most caps, with 114 for Japan.

== List of Eintracht Frankfurt international players ==
=== Afghanistan ===
- Abassin Alikhil
- Ali Amiri
- Zubayr Amiri
- Milad Salem

=== Albania ===
- Geri Cipi
- Mehmet Dragusha
- Ervin Skela

=== Algeria ===
- Farès Chaïbi
- Karim Matmour

=== Australia ===
- Ajdin Hrustic
- Dave Mitchell
- Ned Zelic

=== Austria ===
- Martin Hinteregger
- Erwin Hoffer
- Stefan Ilsanker
- Ümit Korkmaz
- Stefan Lexa
- Heinz Lindner
- Thomas Parits
- Bruno Pezzey
- Markus Weissenberger
- Gerd Wimmer

=== Azerbaijan ===
- Renat Dadashov

=== Belgium ===
- Arthur Theate

=== Bosnia and Herzegovina ===
- Zlatan Bajramović
- Marijan Ćavar

=== Cameroon ===
- Serge Branco
- Mohammadou Idrissou

=== Canada ===
- Olivier Occéan

=== China ===
- Yang Chen

=== Colombia ===
- Rafael Santos Borré

=== Republic of the Congo ===
- Rolf-Christel Guié-Mien

=== Croatia ===
- Kristijan Jakić
- Igor Matanović
- Ivica Mornar
- Ante Rebić
- Gordon Schildenfeld

=== Czech Republic ===
- Martin Fenin
- Václav Kadlec
- Karel Rada

=== Denmark ===
- Rasmus Kristensen
- Jesper Lindstrøm
- Frederik Rønnow

=== Ecuador ===
- Willian Pacho

=== Egypt ===
- Omar Marmoush

=== Finland ===
- Lukáš Hrádecký

=== France ===
- Randal Kolo Muani

=== Georgia ===
- Kakhaber Tskhadadze

=== Germany ===
Note: 1908-1945 German Empire, 1945-1990 West Germany and since 1990 reunified Germany

- Erich Bäumler
- Fritz Becker
- Uwe Bein
- Thomas Berthold
- Manfred Binz
- Ronny Borchers
- Nathaniel Brown
- Jonathan Burkardt
- Nnamdi Collins
- Younes Ebnoutalib
- Ralf Falkenmayer
- Maurizio Gaudino
- Mario Götze
- Jürgen Grabowski
- Rudolf Gramlich
- Horst Heldt
- Bernd Hölzenbein
- Sebastian Jung
- Robin Koch
- Andreas Köpke
- Charly Körbel
- Richard Kress
- Thomas Kroth
- Willi Lindner
- Friedel Lutz
- Hugo Mantel
- Andreas Möller
- Alfons Moog
- Bernd Nickel
- Alfred Pfaff
- Peter Reichel
- Franz Schütz
- Wolfgang Solz
- Hans Stubb
- Willi Tiefel
- Kevin Trapp
- Ralf Weber
- Hans Weilbächer
- Amin Younes

=== Ghana ===
- Tony Yeboah

=== Greece ===
- Ioannis Amanatidis
- Theofanis Gekas
- Sotirios Kyrgiakos
- Nikos Liberopoulos
- Georgios Tzavelas

=== Hungary ===
- Lajos Détári

=== Iran ===
- Mehdi Mahdavikia

=== Israel ===
- Taleb Tawatha

=== Ivory Coast ===
- Constant Djakpa

=== Jamaica ===
- Michael Hector

=== Japan ===
- Ritsu Dōan
- Makoto Hasebe
- Junichi Inamoto
- Takashi Inui
- Daichi Kamada
- Naohiro Takahara

=== Luxembourg ===
- Jan Ostrowski

=== Mali ===
- Almamy Touré

=== Mexico ===
- Marco Fabián
- Aarón Galindo
- Carlos Salcedo

=== Morocco ===
- Ayoube Amaimouni
- Aymen Barkok

=== North Macedonia ===
Note: 1993-2019 Former Yugoslav Republic of Macedonia (FYROM) and since 2019 North Macedonia.

- Saša Ćirić
- Oka Nikolov
- Aleksandar Vasoski

=== Norway ===
- Jørn Andersen
- Vadim Demidov
- Jens Petter Hauge

=== Nigeria ===
- Jay-Jay Okocha

=== Paraguay ===
- Nelson Valdez

=== Peru ===
- Carlos Zambrano

=== Philippines ===
- Stephan Schröck

=== Poland ===
- Dariusz Adamczuk
- Paweł Kryszałowicz
- Włodzimierz Smolarek

=== Portugal ===
- Gonçalo Paciência
- André Silva

=== Serbia ===
- Mijat Gaćinović
- Luka Jović
- Filip Kostić

=== Slovakia ===
- Peter Németh
- Marek Penksa

=== South Korea ===
- Cha Bum-Kun
- Cha Du-Ri
- Sim Jae-won

=== Sweden ===
- Hugo Larsson
- Jan Svensson

=== Switzerland ===
- Aurèle Amenda
- Tranquillo Barnetta
- Walter Dietrich
- Gelson Fernandes
- Benjamin Huggel
- Pirmin Schwegler
- Haris Seferovic
- Djibril Sow
- Christoph Spycher
- Steven Zuber

=== Togo ===
- Lilian Brassier

=== Tunisia ===
- Ellyes Skhiri

=== Turkey ===
- Halil Altıntop
- Ender Konca
- Can Uzun

=== United States ===
- Paxten Aaronson
- Ricardo Clark
- Timothy Chandler

=== FR Yugoslavia ===
- Slobodan Komljenović

== Medalist players at major international tournaments ==
=== World Cup ===
==== Champions ====
World Cup 1954 – West Germany

- (Germany) Alfred Pfaff (1949–1961)
- (Germany) Toni Turek (1946–1947)

World Cup 1974 – West Germany

- (Germany) Jürgen Grabowski (1965–1980)
- (Germany) Bernd Hölzenbein (1967–1981)
- (Germany) Jupp Heynckes (1994–1995)

World Cup 1990 – West Germany

- (Germany) Uwe Bein (1989–1994)
- (Germany) Thomas Berthold (1982–1987)
- (Germany) Andreas Möller (1985–1987, 1990–1992, 2003–2004)
- (Germany) Andreas Köpke (1994–1996)

World Cup 2014 – Germany

- (Germany) Erik Durm (2019–2022)
- (Germany) Mario Götze (2022–)
- (Germany) Joachim Löw (1981–1982)

===== Runner-up =====
World Cup 1954 – Hungary

- (Hungary) Gyula Lóránt (1976, as a manager)

World Cup 1966 – West Germany

- (Germany) Jürgen Grabowski (1965–1980)
- (Germany) Friedel Lutz (1957–1966), (1967–1973)
- (Germany) Hans Tilkowski (1967–1970)

World Cup 1982 – West Germany

- (Germany) Manfred Kaltz (2000–2001, as an assistant manager)
- (Germany) Felix Magath (1999–2001, as a manager)

World Cup 1986 – West Germany

- (Germany) Thomas Berthold (1982–1987)
- (Germany) Felix Magath (1999–2001, as a manager)
- (Germany) Uwe Rahn (1992–1993)
- (Germany) Wolfgang Rolff (2014–2015, as an assistant manager)
- (Germany) Uli Stein (1987–1994)

World Cup 2002 – Germany

- (Germany) Jörg Böhme (1995–1996)
- (Germany) Marko Rehmer (2005–2007)
- (Germany) Bernd Schneider (1998–1999)

World Cup 2018 – Croatia

- (Croatia) Ante Rebić (2016–2019)

World Cup 2022 – France

- (France) Randal Kolo Muani (2022–2023)

===== Third place =====
World Cup 1934 – Germany

- (Nazi Germany) Rudi Gramlich (1929–1939), (1943–1944)

World Cup 1970 – West Germany

- (Germany) Jürgen Grabowski (1965–1980)

World Cup 1982 – Poland

- (Poland) Włodzimierz Smolarek (1986–1988)

World Cup 2006 – Germany

- (Germany) Timo Hildebrand (2014–2015)
- (Germany) Bernd Schneider (1998–1999)

World Cup 2010 – Germany

- (Germany) Joachim Löw (1981–1982)
- (Germany) Marko Marin (1996–2005)

World Cup 2014 – Netherlands

- (Netherlands) Jonathan de Guzmán (2017–2020)

World Cup 2022 – Croatia

- (Croatia) Kristijan Jakić (2021–2024)

=== Continental tournaments ===
==== UEFA Euro/European Nations' Cup ====
===== Champions =====
UEFA Euro 1972 – West Germany

- (Germany) Jürgen Grabowski (1965–1980)
- (Germany) Jupp Heynckes (1994–1995, as a manager)
- (Germany) Horst Köppel (1994–1995, as an assistant manager)

UEFA Euro 1980 – West Germany

- (Germany) Felix Magath (1999–2001, as a manager)

UEFA Euro 1996 – Germany

- (Germany) Andreas Köpke (1994–1996)
- (Germany) Andreas Möller (1985–1987, 1990–1992, 2003–2004)

===== Runners-up =====
European Nations' Cup 1960 – Yugoslavia

- (Socialist Federal Republic of Yugoslavia) Fahrudin Jusufi (1966–1970)
- (Socialist Federal Republic of Yugoslavia) Branko Zebec (1982–1983, as a manager)

UEFA Euro 1976 – West Germany

- (Germany) Bernd Hölzenbein (1967–1981)
- (Germany) Peter Reichel (1970–1979)

UEFA Euro 1992 – Germany

- (Germany) Manfred Binz (1985–1996)
- (Germany) Thomas Doll (1994–1996)
- (Germany) Andreas Köpke (1994–1996)
- (Germany) Andreas Möller (1985–1987, 1990–1992, 2003–2004)

UEFA Euro 1996 – Czech Republic

- (Czech Republic) Karel Rada (2001–2002)

UEFA Euro 2024 – Spain

- (Spain) Joselu (2013–2014)

==== Africa Cup of Nations ====
===== Champions =====
1994 African Cup of Nations – Nigeria

- (Nigeria) Jay-Jay Okocha (1992–1996)

2023 Africa Cup of Nations – Ivory Coast

- (Ivory Coast) Sébastien Haller (2017–2019)
- (Ivory Coast) Evan Ndicka (2018–2023)

===== Runners-up =====
1992 African Cup of Nations – Ghana

- (Ghana) Tony Yeboah (1990–1995)

==== AFC Asian Cup ====
===== Champions =====
2011 AFC Asian Cup – Japan

- (Japan) Makoto Hasebe (2014–2024)

===== Runners-up =====
1972 AFC Asian Cup – South Korea

- (South Korea) Cha Bum-kun (1979–1983)

2015 AFC Asian Cup – South Korea

- (South Korea) Cha Du-ri (2003–2006)

==== Copa América ====
===== Runners-up =====
2024 Copa América – Colombia

- (Colombia) Rafael Santos Borré (2021–2023)

===== Third place =====
2021 Copa América – Colombia

- (Colombia) Rafael Santos Borré (2021–2023)

2024 Copa América – Uruguay

- (Uruguay) Guillermo Varela (2016–2017)

=== FIFA Confederations Cup ===
==== Champions ====
2017 FIFA Confederations Cup – Germany

- (Germany) Emre Can (2006–2009)
- (Germany) Niklas Süle (2006–2009)
- (Germany) Kevin Trapp (2012–2015, 2018–2025)
- (Germany) Amin Younes (2020–2022)

===== Runners-up =====
1997 FIFA Confederations Cup – Australia

- (Australia) Ned Zelic (1996)

===== Third place =====
1997 FIFA Confederations Cup – Czech Republic

- (Czech Republic) Karel Rada (2001–2002)

2005 FIFA Confederations Cup – Germany

- (Germany) Timo Hildebrand
- (Germany) Bernd Schneider

2017 FIFA Confederations Cup – Portugal

- (Portugal) André Silva

=== Summer Olympics ===
==== Gold ====
Summer Olympics 1952 – Hungary

- (Hungary) Gyula Lóránt (1976, as a manager)

Summer Olympics 1960– Yugoslavia

- (Socialist Federal Republic of Yugoslavia) Fahrudin Jusufi (1966–1970)

Summer Olympics 1996 – Nigeria

- (Nigeria) Jay-Jay Okocha (1992–1996)

Summer Olympics 2000 – Cameroon

- (Cameroon) Serge Branco (2000–2003)

Summer Olympics 2012 – Mexico

- (Mexico) Marco Fabián (2016–2019)

==== Silver ====
Summer Olympics 1924 – Switzerland

- (Switzerland) Walter Dietrich (1925–1938)

Summer Olympics 1952 – Yugoslavia

- (Socialist Federal Republic of Yugoslavia) Ivica Horvat (1957–1961)
- (Socialist Federal Republic of Yugoslavia) Branko Zebec (1982–1983, as a manager)

Summer Olympics 1992 – Poland

- (Poland) Dariusz Adamczuk (1992–1993)

Summer Olympics 2016 – Germany

- (Germany) Niklas Süle (2006–2009)

==== Bronze ====
Summer Olympics 1988 – West Germany

- (Germany) Rudi Bommer (1992–1997)
- (Germany) Olaf Janßen (1996–2000)
- (Germany) Ralf Sievers (1982–1990)
