= 1953–54 Eintracht Frankfurt season =

Eintracht Frankfurt
1953–54 season
- Chairman: Anton Keller
- Manager: Kurt Windmann
- Oberliga Süd: 2nd / Eliminated in championship group 1
- Top goalscorer: League: Richard Kress (17); All: Richard Kress (17)
- Highest home attendance: 35,000 on three occasions (league)
- Lowest home attendance: 6,000 30 November 1952 v BC Augsburg (league)
- Average home league attendance: 17,733

The 1953–54 Eintracht Frankfurt season was the 54th season in the club's football history. In 1953–54 the club played in the Oberliga Süd, the top tier of German football. It was the club's 9th season in the Oberliga Süd.

The season ended up with Eintracht finishing in the Oberliga Süd as runners-up. In the German championship round the Eagles didn't qualify for the final match.

== Matches ==
=== Legend ===
Win Draw Loss Postponed

=== Friendlies ===
1 August 1953	Maingau XI (West Germany)	1–6	(West Germany) Eintracht Frankfurt	Hochheim am Main, West Germany
	Olbert 51'	Report	Gonschorek 14', 32'; Weilbächer 19'; Heilig 45'; Kress 47'; Schreiber 67' (o.g.)	Attendance: 3,000; Referee: Rossel

2 August 1953	Bayern Hof (West Germany)	2–2	(West Germany) Eintracht Frankfurt
	Hüttner 38'; Thielhorn 55'	Report	Pfaff 69' (pen.); Weilbächer 80'	Attendance: 6,500; Referee: Fiedler

16 August 1953	TSG Ulm 1846 (West Germany)	2–1	(West Germany) Eintracht Frankfurt
	Schoy 34'; Sick 72'	Report	Remlein 57'	Attendance: 2,800; Referee: Horn

11 October 1953	Schwarz-Weiß Essen (West Germany)	1–3	(West Germany) Eintracht Frankfurt	Essen, West Germany
	Zaro 56'	Report	Kress 5', 51'; Dziwoki 47'	Stadium: Uhlenkrugstadion; Attendance: 10,000; Referee: Heckel

11 April 1954	Eintracht Frankfurt (West Germany)	1–1	(Brazil) Flamengo	Frankfurt, West Germany
	Kress 86'		Zezinho 60'	Attendance: 28,000; Referee: Meißner

18 April 1954	Eintracht Frankfurt (West Germany)	2–1	(Austria) First Vienna	Kirchhain, West Germany
	Kress 52'; Höfer 61'	Report	Groß 25'	Attendance: 12,000; Referee: Sparring

19 April 1954	Arminia Bielefeld / VfB Bielefeld XI (West Germany)	0–6	(West Germany) Eintracht Frankfurt	Paderborn, West Germany
		Report	Remlein 36'; Höfer 38'; Reichert 50'; Kress 51', 62'; Gonschorek 68'	Attendance: 8,000

29 May 1954	FSV Frankfurt (West Germany)	0–3	(West Germany) Eintracht Frankfurt	Frankfurt, West Germany
		Report	Reichert 17'; Dziwoki 40'; Bayer 87'	Stadium: Stadion am Bornheimer Hang; Attendance: 3,000; Referee: Tschenscher

17 June 1954	FV Horas (West Germany)	2–8	(West Germany) Eintracht Frankfurt	West Germany
	Völler 19'	Report	Kress; Weilbächer 35'; Bayer 50'; Geiger; Reichert	Attendance: 2,500; Referee: Wildfang

19 June 1954	ATS Kulmbach (West Germany)	0–5	(West Germany) Eintracht Frankfurt	Kulmbach, West Germany
		Report	Bayer 35'; Geiger 37'; Weilbächer	Attendance: 2,500

20 June 1954	TSV 04 Schwabach (West Germany)	2–3	(West Germany) Eintracht Frankfurt	Schwabach, West Germany
	Dreyer; Trabinger	Report	Höfer 30' (pen.); Hesse 49'; Bayer 55'	Attendance: 2,500; Referee: Strobel

26 June 1954	Freiburger FC (West Germany)	0–3	(West Germany) Eintracht Frankfurt
		Report	Höfer; Heilig 51'; Bayer 88'	Referee: Hesse

27 June 1954	Homburg XI (West Germany)	2–7	(West Germany) Eintracht Frankfurt	Homburg, Saar Protectorate
	Clemens		Gonschorek; Bayer; Kress; Höfer; Weilbächer; Kudrass	Attendance: 3,000

30 June 1954	SG Kelkheim (West Germany)	0–4	(West Germany) Eintracht Frankfurt	Kelkheim, West Germany
		Report	Kress 11'; Kirchheim 49'; Ebeling (58)

=== Oberliga ===
==== League table ====
Pos	Team	Pld	W	D	L	GF	GA	GD	Pts	Promotion, qualification or relegation
1	VfB Stuttgart	30	18	7	5	64	39	+25	43	Qualification to German championship
2	Eintracht Frankfurt	30	17	8	5	70	31	+39	42	Qualification to German championship
3	Kickers Offenbach	30	16	9	5	70	38	+32	41	
4	1. FC Nürnberg	30	15	8	7	71	44	+27	38	
5	Karlsruher SC	30	14	7	9	61	53	+8	35	

Source: RSSSF.com
Rules for classification: 1) Points;

==== Results summary ====
Overall								Home						Away					
Pld	W	D	L	GF	GA	GD	Pts	W	D	L	GF	GA	GD	W	D	L	GF	GA	GD
30	17	8	5	70	31	+39	42	12	2	1	43	11	+32	5	6	4	27	20	+7

Source: Bundesliga

==== Results by round ====
Round	1	2	3	4	5	6	7	8	9	10	11	12	13	14	15	16	17	18	19	20	21	22	23	24	25	26	27	28	29	30
Ground	A	H	A	H	H	A	H	A	H	A	H	A	H	A	H	H	A	H	A	A	H	A	H	A	H	A	H	A	H	A
Result	D	L	W	W	W	W	W	L	W	D	W	D	W	W	D	W	D	W	W	L	L	L	W	L	W	D	W	D	D	W
Position	7	4	3	2	2	2	2	2	2	2	2	1	1	1	1	1	1	1	1	1	1	2	1	2	2	2	2	2	2	2

A = Away; H = Home; W = Win; D = Draw; L = Loss

==== League fixtures and results ====
9 August 1953 1	Viktoria Aschaffenburg	2–2	Eintracht Frankfurt	West Germany
	Schultz 37', 45'	Report	Kress 16', 33'	Attendance: 15,000; Referee: Schmetzer

23 August 1953 2	Eintracht Frankfurt	4–1	SV Waldhof	Frankfurt, West Germany
	Kress 13', 17'; Pfaff 21'; Heilig 31'	Report	Herbold 80'	Stadium: Riederwaldstadion; Attendance: 12,000; Referee: Jakob

30 August 1953 3	BC Augsburg	2–4	Eintracht Frankfurt	West Germany
	Schuller 13' (pen.); Bachl 86'	Report	Weilbächer 6'; Kress 12'; Pfaff 67'; Dziwoki 77'	Attendance: 9,000; Referee: Eisenmann

5 September 1953 4	Eintracht Frankfurt	7–0	Stuttgarter Kickers	Frankfurt, West Germany
	Pfaff 22', 35', 78'; Dziwoki 42', 48'; Geier 59'; Weilbächer 73'	Report		Stadium: Riederwaldstadion; Attendance: 9,000; Referee: Ruhmann

13 September 1953 5	Eintracht Frankfurt	2–0	Hessen Kassel	Frankfurt, West Germany
	Kress 6'; Dziwoki 88'	Report		Stadium: Riederwaldstadion; Attendance: 10,000; Referee: Heuß

19 September 1953 6	FSV Frankfurt	0–6	Eintracht Frankfurt	Frankfurt, West Germany
			Weilbächer 14', 73'; Dziwoki 27', 48'; Kress 36'; Geier 49'	Stadium: Stadion am Bornheimer Hang; Attendance: 30,000; Referee: Jakobi

27 September 1953 7	Eintracht Frankfurt	2–1	Kickers Offenbach	Frankfurt, West Germany
	Weilbächer 31'; Dziwoki 61'	Report	Kraus 46'	Stadium: Riederwaldstadion; Attendance: 35,000; Referee: Kandelbinder

4 October 1953 8	VfB Stuttgart	1–0	Eintracht Frankfurt	Stuttgart, West Germany
	Baitinger 6'	Report		Stadium: Neckarstadion; Attendance: 25,000; Referee: Meißner

18 October 1953 9	Eintracht Frankfurt	2–1	Karlsruher SC	Frankfurt, West Germany
	Dziwoki 2'; Kress 68'	Report	Rau 69'	Stadium: Riederwaldstadion; Attendance: 18,000; Referee: Albert

25 October 1953 10	VfR Mannheim	2–2	Eintracht Frankfurt	Mannheim, West Germany
	Dziwoki 49'; Weilbächer 52'	Report	Langlotz 62', 68'	Attendance: 15,000; Referee: Ruhmann

1 November 1953 11	Eintracht Frankfurt	2–1	SpVgg Fürth	Frankfurt, West Germany
	Dziwoki 54'; Kress 73'	Report	Appis 81'	Stadium: Riederwaldstadion; Attendance: 20,000; Referee: Schmelzer

8 November 1953 12	Bayern Munich	0–0	Eintracht Frankfurt	Munich, West Germany
		Report		Stadium: Grünwalder Stadion; Attendance: 32,000; Referee: Tschenscher

15 November 1953 13	Eintracht Frankfurt	2–0	Schweinfurt 05	Frankfurt, West Germany
	Kress 46'; Schmitt 87' (o.g.)	Report		Stadium: Riederwaldstadion; Attendance: 12,000; Referee: Ketsch

29 November 1953 14	1. FC Nürnberg	0–2	Eintracht Frankfurt	Nuremberg, West Germany
		Report	Kress 44'; Dziwoki 47'	Stadium: Zabo; Attendance: 29,000; Referee: Jakobi

6 December 1953 15	Eintracht Frankfurt	1–1	Jahn Regensburg	West Germany
	Pfaff 2'	Report	Hubeny 56'	Attendance: 15,000; Referee: Krämer

19 December 1953 16	Eintracht Frankfurt	3–0	Viktoria Aschaffenburg	West Germany
	Heilig 7'; Kress 48'; Pfaff 84' (pen.)	Report		Attendance: 9,000; Referee: Eberle

27 December 1953 17	SV Waldhof	1–1	Eintracht Frankfurt	Mannheim, West Germany
	Rube 70'	Report	Heilig 83'	Attendance: 8,000; Referee: Meißner

3 January 1954 18	Eintracht Frankfurt	3–0	BC Augsburg	Frankfurt, West Germany
	Ebeling 15', 81'; Dziwoki 47'	Report		Stadium: Riederwaldstadion; Attendance: 6,000; Referee: Baumgartner

10 January 1954 19	Stuttgarter Kickers	1–2	Eintracht Frankfurt	Stuttgart, West Germany
	Ritter 85'	Report	Heilig 30'; Kress 70'	Stadium: Waldau-Stadion; Attendance: 7,000; Referee: Handwerker

17 January 1954 20	Hessen Kassel	1–0	Eintracht Frankfurt	Kassel, West Germany
	Dinger 60'	Report		Stadium: Auestadion; Attendance: 30,000; Referee: Dusch

24 January 1954 21	Eintracht Frankfurt	1–2	FSV Frankfurt	Frankfurt, West Germany
	Weilbächer 53'	Report	Popović 16', 37'	Stadium: Riederwaldstadion; Attendance: 35,000; Referee: Jakobi

31 January 1954 22	Kickers Offenbach	2–1	Eintracht Frankfurt	Offenbach, West Germany
	Kircher 62'; Schreiner 70'	Report	Kress 55'	Stadium: Stadion am Bieberer Berg; Attendance: 18,000; Referee: Meißner

7 February 1954 23	Eintracht Frankfurt	5–0	VfB Stuttgart	Frankfurt, West Germany
	Weilbächer 18', 56'; Dziwoki 43'; Remlein 59' (pen.); Pfaff 61'	Report		Stadium: Riederwaldstadion; Attendance: 28,000; Referee: Schmetzer

14 February 1954 24	Karlsruher SC	5–2	Eintracht Frankfurt	West Germany
	Traub 5', 49'; Rastetter 51'; Kunkel 57', 89'	Report	Reichert 7'; Remlein 88' (pen.)	Attendance: 14,000; Referee: Horn

21 February 1954 25	Eintracht Frankfurt	4–2	VfR Mannheim	Frankfurt, West Germany
	Kress 8', 49'; Heilig 20'; Dziwoki 89'	Report	de la Vigne 9', 62'	Stadium: Riederwaldstadion; Attendance: 10,000; Referee: Ruhmann

27 February 1954 26	SpVgg Fürth	1–1	Eintracht Frankfurt	Fürth, West Germany
	Engelhardt 87'	Report	Pfaff 72'	Stadium: Sportpark Ronhof; Attendance: 9,000; Referee: Eisenmann

7 March 1954 27	Eintracht Frankfurt	3–0	Bayern Munich	Frankfurt, West Germany
	Gonschorek 45', 62', 88'	Report		Stadium: Riederwaldstadion; Attendance: 12,000; Referee: Handwerker

14 March 1954 28	Schweinfurt 05	2–2	Eintracht Frankfurt	West Germany
	Rath 33'; Geyer 64'	Report	Dziwoki 35', 48'	Attendance: 12,000; Referee: Jacobi

20 March 1954 29	Eintracht Frankfurt	2–2	1. FC Nürnberg	Frankfurt, West Germany
	Baumann 9' (o.g.); Wloka 85'	Report	Winterstein 43'; Herbolsheimer 69'	Stadium: Riederwaldstadion; Attendance: 35,000; Referee: Freimuth

4 April 1954 30	Jahn Regensburg	0–2	Eintracht Frankfurt	Regensburg, West Germany
		Report	Kress 48'; Höfer 65'	Stadium: Jahnstadion; Attendance: 22,000; Referee: Jakobi

=== Championship round ===
Pos	Team	Pld	W	D	L	GF	GA	GR	Pts	Qualification	FCK	KOE	SGE
1	1. FC Kaiserslautern	2	2	0	0	5	3	1.667	4	Advance to final	—	4–3	1–0
2	1. FC Köln	2	1	0	1	6	6	1.000	2		—	—	3–2
3	Eintracht Frankfurt	2	0	0	2	2	4	0.500	0		—	—	—

Source: RSSSF
Rules for classification: 1) Points; 2) Goal ratio.

2 May 1954 1	1. FC Kaiserslautern	1–0	Eintracht Frankfurt	Cologne, West Germany
	F Walter 82'	Report		Stadium: Müngersdorfer Stadion; Attendance: 47,000; Referee: Ternieden

8 May 1954 2	1. FC Köln	3–2	Eintracht Frankfurt	Ludwigshafen, West Germany
	Stollenwerk 31', 39'; Dörner 50'	Report	Heilig 25'; Weilbächer 55'	Stadium: Südweststadion; Attendance: 35,000; Referee: Eix

== Squad ==
=== Squad and statistics ===
No.	Pos	Nat	Player	Total		Oberliga		Championship round	
No.	Pos	Nat	Player	Apps	Goals	Apps	Goals	Apps	Goals
	GK	(West Germany) FRG	Helmut Henig	31	0	29	0	2	0
	GK	(West Germany) FRG	Alexander Rothuber	1	0	1	0	0	0
	DF	(West Germany) FRG	Adolf Bechtold	31	0	29	0	2	0
	DF	(West Germany) FRG	Karlheinz Greiner	1	0	1	0	0	0
	DF	(West Germany) FRG	Hermann Hesse	1	0	1	0	0	0
	DF	(West Germany) FRG	Heinz Kaster	1	0	1	0	0	0
	DF	(West Germany) FRG	Ernst Kudrass	30	0	28	0	2	0
	MF	(West Germany) FRG	Werner Heilig	31	6	29	5	2	1
	MF	(West Germany) FRG	Kurt Krömmelbein	6	0	6	0	0	0
	MF	(West Germany) FRG	Alfons Remlein	29	2	27	2	2	0
	MF	(West Germany) FRG	Hans Wloka	30	1	28	1	2	0
	FW	(West Germany) FRG	Erich Dziwoki	32	16	30	16	2	0
	FW	(West Germany) FRG	Erich Ebeling	10	2	10	2	0	0
	FW	(West Germany) FRG	Erich Geier	11	2	11	2	0	0
	FW	(West Germany) FRG	Erich Gonschorek	4	3	4	3	0	0
	FW	(West Germany) FRG	Hermann Höfer	3	1	1	1	2	0
	FW	(West Germany) FRG	Richard Kress	32	17	30	17	2	0
	FW	(West Germany) FRG	Alfred Pfaff	30	9	28	9	2	0
	FW	(West Germany) FRG	Friedel Reichert	6	1	6	1	0	0
	FW	(West Germany) FRG	Hans Weilbächer	32	10	30	9	2	1

=== Transfers ===
In:

No.	Pos.	Nation	Player
—	FW	(West Germany) FRG	Erich Gonschorek (from FSV Frankfurt)
—	DF	(West Germany) FRG	Karlheinz Greiner (from Eintracht Frankfurt Amateurs)
—	FW	(West Germany) FRG	Hermann Höfer (from Eintracht Frankfurt Amateurs)
—	FW	(West Germany) FRG	Richard Kress (from FV Horas)
—	MF	(West Germany) FRG	Alfons Remlein (from TSG Ulm 1846)
—	FW	(West Germany) FRG	Hans Weilbächer (from Eintracht Frankfurt Amateurs)

Out:

No.	Pos.	Nation	Player
—	FW	(West Germany) FRG	Horst Bayer (to Eintracht Frankfurt Amateurs)
—	FW	(West Germany) FRG	Heinz Dokter (to SpVgg Herten)
—	MF	(West Germany) FRG	Klaus Jäckel (to Eintracht Frankfurt Amateurs)
—	FW	(West Germany) FRG	Joachim Jänisch (to Rot-Weiss Essen)
—	MF	(West Germany) FRG	Karlheinz Kirchheim (to Eintracht Frankfurt Amateurs)
—	FW	(West Germany) FRG	Hubert Schieth (to Schwarz-Weiß Essen)
—	FW	(West Germany) FRG	Egon Schwan (to SpVgg Herten)

== See also ==
- 1954 German football championship

== Sources ==
- Matheja, Ulrich (2011). Unsere Eintracht - Eintracht Frankfurt - Die Chronik. Die Werkstatt. ISBN 978-3-89533-750-5.
