= List of Eintracht Frankfurt records and statistics =

This article details various records of German football club Eintracht Frankfurt under the categories listed below.

== Player records ==
=== Appearances ===
- Record appearances: Charly Körbel, 728, 1972–1991
- Record league appearances: Charly Körbel, 602, 1972–1991
- Record DFB-Pokal appearances: Charly Körbel, 70
- Record European football appearances: Charly Körbel, 53
- Most capped player: Makoto Hasebe, 114, Japan
- Most capped German player: Andreas Möller, 85
- Most caps gained while at Eintracht: Jürgen Grabowski, 44
- First capped player: Fritz Becker (at Eintracht predecessor FC Frankfurter Kickers) (for (German Empire) Germany v Switzerland, 3–5, 5 April 1908)

==== All-time appearances ====
| Rank | Player | Career | Appearances | Goals |
|---|---|---|---|---|
| 1 | (Germany) Charly Körbel | 1972–1991 | 728 | 51 |
| 2 | (Germany) Jürgen Grabowski | 1965–1980 | 536 | 140 |
| 3 | (Germany) Bernd Nickel | 1967–1983 | 528 | 175 |
| 4 | (Germany) Bernd Hölzenbein | 1967–1981 | 516 | 207 |
| 5 | (Germany) Uwe Bindewald | 1988–2004 | 442 | 9 |
| 6 | (Germany) Adolf Bechtold | 1942–1960 | 433 | 3 |
| 7 | (Germany) Dieter Lindner | 1956–1971 | 416 | 72 |
| 8 | (North Macedonia) Oka Nikolov | 1995–2013 | 415 | 0 |
| 9 | (Germany) Manfred Binz | 1985–1996 | 411 | 38 |
| 10 | (Germany) Werner Heilig | 1939–1957 | 397 | 58 |

=== Goalscorers ===
- All-time record goalscorer: Karl Ehmer, 225 goals, 1927–1938
- Most Bundesliga goals: Bernd Hölzenbein, 160 goals, 1967–1981
- Most Bundesliga goals in one season: André Silva, 28 goals, 2020–21
- Most DFB-Pokal goals: Bernd Hölzenbein, 23 goals
- Most European goals: Bernd Hölzenbein, 24 goals

==== All-time goalscorers ====
Top goalscorers
| Rank | Player | Career | Apps | Goals | Average |
|---|---|---|---|---|---|
| 1 | (Germany) Karl Ehmer | 1927–1938 | 222 | 225 | 1.01 |
| 2 | (Germany) Bernd Hölzenbein | 1967–1981 | 516 | 207 | 0.40 |
| 3 | (Germany) Bernd Nickel | 1967–1983 | 528 | 175 | 0.33 |
| 4 | (Germany) Jürgen Grabowski | 1965–1980 | 536 | 140 | 0.26 |
| 5 | (Germany) Adam Schmitt | 1935–1949 | 233 | 138 | 0.59 |
| 6 | (Germany) Erwin Stein | 1959–1966 | 200 | 138 | 0.69 |
| 7 | (Germany) Alexander Meier | 2004–2018 | 379 | 137 | 0.36 |
| 8 | (Germany) Alfred Pfaff | 1949–1961 | 358 | 136 | 0.38 |
| 9 | (Germany) Alfred Kraus | 1935–1947; 1949–1952 | 106 | 103 | 0.97 |
| 10 | (Germany) Fritz Schaller | 1925–1933 | 180 | 101 | 0.56 |

== Club records ==
=== Scores ===
- Record Bundesliga win: 9–1 vs. Rot-Weiss Essen, Waldstadion (H), 5 October 1974
- Record DFB-Pokal win:
  - 11–0 vs. SC St. Tönis, Grotenburg-Stadion (A), 21 August 2026
  - 8–0 vs. Karlsruher SC, Wildparkstadion (A), 12 April 1959
  - 8–0 vs. Rödelheimer FC 02, venue unknown (A), 19 December 1959
  - 10–2 vs. Hertha Zehlendorf, Waldstadion (H), 15 October 1976
- Record European win: 9–0 vs. (Poland) Widzew Łódź, Waldstadion (H), 30 September 1992
- Record Bundesliga defeat: 0–7, vs. Karlsruher SC, Waldstadion (H), 19 October 1964

=== Firsts ===
- First match: (as FFC Victoria) vs. 1. Bockenheimer FC 1899, Friendly, 4–1, venue unknown (H), 19 March 1899
- First match: (as Eintracht Frankfurt) vs. SV Wiesbaden, Friendly, 2–2, venue unknown (H), 2 May 1920
- First DFB-Pokal match: vs. SC Opel Rüsselsheim, 1–3, venue unknown (H), 11 May 1935
- First Bundesliga match: vs. 1. FC Kaiserslautern, 1-1, Waldstadion (H), 24 August 1963
- First match at Waldstadion: vs. (Argentina) Boca Juniors, Friendly, lost 0–2, 27 May 1925
- First European match: vs. (Switzerland) Young Boys, won 4–1, European Cup, Wankdorfstadion (A), 4 November 1959

=== Attendances ===
- Record home attendance: 81,000 vs. FK Pirmasens, won 3–2, Waldstadion (H), 23 May 1959
- Record European attendance: 127,621 vs. (Spain) Real Madrid, lost 3–7, Hampden Park, (N), 18 May 1960
- Record season average attendance: 57,600 2024–25

=== Transfers ===
==== Bought ====
| Rank | Fee | Player | From | Year |
|---|---|---|---|---|
| 1 | €31,500,000 | (France) Hugo Ekitike | (France) Paris Saint-Germain | 2024 |
| 2 | €26,000,000 | (Ivory Coast) Elye Wahi | (France) Marseille | 2025 |
| 3 | €22,340,000 | (Serbia) Luka Jović | (Portugal) Benfica | 2019 |
| 4 | €21,000,000 | (Germany) Jonathan Burkardt | (Germany) Mainz 05 | 2025 |
| 4 | €21,000,000 | (Japan) Ritsu Dōan | (Germany) SC Freiburg | 2025 |

==== Sold ====
| Rank | Fee | Player | To | Year |
|---|---|---|---|---|
| 1 | €95,000,000 | (France) Randal Kolo Muani | (France) Paris Saint-Germain | 2023 |
| 2 | €91,000,000 | (France) Hugo Ekitike | (England) Liverpool | 2025 |
| 3 | €75,000,000 | (Egypt) Omar Marmoush | (England) Manchester City | 2025 |
| 4 | €63,000,000 | (Serbia) Luka Jović | (Spain) Real Madrid | 2019 |
| 5 | €50,000,000 | (France) Sébastien Haller | (England) West Ham United | 2019 |

== Bundesliga records ==
=== Club records ===
==== Wins and losses ====
- Lowest number of losses in a season closing half: (Note: Source: kicker.de - Choosable league table for every season) 0 by Eintracht Frankfurt (1976–77) same as Bayern Munich (1986–87, 2012–13 and 2019–20) and Borussia Dortmund (2011–12)
- Lowest number of losses in a season at home (34 games): 0 by Eintracht Frankfurt (1971–72 and 1973–74) same as 1860 Munich (1965–66), Bayern Munich (1970–71 to 1973–74, 1980–81, 1983–84, 1996–97, 1998–99, 2001–02, 2007–08 and 2016–17), MSV Duisburg (1970–71), Schalke 04 (1970–71), 1. FC Köln (1972–73 and 1987–88), Hertha BSC (1974–75 and 1977–78), Eintracht Braunschweig (1975–76), Hamburger SV (1981–82, 1982–83 and 1995–96), 1. FC Kaiserslautern (1981–82 and 1994–95), Werder Bremen (1982–83, 1984–85, 1985–86 and 1992–93), Borussia Mönchengladbach (1983–84), Karlsruher SC (1992–93), Bayer Leverkusen (1999–2000 and 2023–24), VfL Wolfsburg (2008–09 and 2014–15), Borussia Dortmund (2008–09, 2015–16 and 2016–17) and Hannover 96 (2011–12)
- Highest number of losses: 697 by Eintracht Frankfurt
- Lowest number of wins in a season away: 0 by Eintracht Frankfurt (1986–87 and 1995–96) same as Tasmania Berlin (1965–66), Karlsruher SC (1965–66, 1967–68 and 1976–77), Borussia Neunkirchen (1967–68), Borussia Dortmund (1967–68 and 1978–79), Hannover 96 (1969–70, 1971–72 and 2018–19), Alemannia Aachen (1969–70), Arminia Bielefeld (1971–72), Rot-Weiß Oberhausen (1972–73), Hertha BSC (1972–73 and 1982–83) Wuppertaler SV (1974–75), VfB Stuttgart (1974–75 and 2000–01), VfL Bochum (1975–76), Tennis Borussia Berlin (1976–77), Rot-Weiß Essen (1976–77), Bayern Munich (1977–78), Eintracht Braunschweig (1979–80), Bayer 05 Uerdingen (1980–81), Fortuna Düsseldorf (1981–82), MSV Duisburg (1981–82), 1. FC Nürnberg (1983–84), Kickers Offenbach (1983–84), FC 08 Homburg (1986–87), SV Waldhof Mannheim (1986–87), FC St. Pauli (1988–89 and 2001–02), Dynamo Dresden (1992–93), SG Wattenscheid 09 (1993–94), Borussia Mönchengladbach (1998–99 and 2004–05), 1. FC Köln (2003–04), SC Freiburg (2003–04), Schalke 04 (2020–21) and Greuther Fürth (2021–22)

==== Goals ====
- Lowest number of goals scored in a season opening half: 8 by Eintracht Frankfurt (1988–89) same as Tasmania Berlin (1965–66)

==== Runs ====
- Highest number of consecutive games unbeaten from start of the season closing half: 17 by Eintracht Frankfurt (1976–77) same as Bayern Munich (1986–87, 2012–13 and 2019–20) and Borussia Dortmund (2011–12)

=== Player and manager records ===
==== Appearances ====
- Highest number of appearances as a player for one club: 602 by Charly Körbel for Eintracht Frankfurt (1972–73 to 1990–91)
- Highest number of appearances as a player for one club having not played for another club: 602 by Charly Körbel for Eintracht Frankfurt (1972–73 to 1990–91)
- Oldest age for a player making his debut appearance: 38 years and 171 days by Richard Kress for Eintracht Frankfurt (matchday 1 of 1963–64)
- Highest number of seasons as a player for one club: 19 by Charly Körbel for Eintracht Frankfurt (1972–73 to 1990–91) same as Klaus Fichtel (1965–66 to 1979–80 and 1984–85 to 1987–88) for Schalke 04, Manfred Kaltz for Hamburger SV (1971–72 to 1988–89 and 1990–91)
- Highest number of seasons as a player for one club having not played for another club: 19 by Charly Körbel for Eintracht Frankfurt (1972–73 to 1990–91)

==== Runs ====
- Highest number of consecutive seasons as a player for one club: 19 by Charly Körbel for Eintracht Frankfurt (1972–73 to 1990–91)
- Highest number of consecutive seasons as a player for one club, having not played for another club: 19 by Charly Körbel for Eintracht Frankfurt (1972–73 to 1990–91)

==== Cards ====
- Shortest elapsed timespan before receiving a red card: 43 seconds (after being substituted onto the pitch) by Marcel Titsch-Rivero of Eintracht Frankfurt (matchday 34 of 2010–11)

== Honours and achievements ==
=== National ===
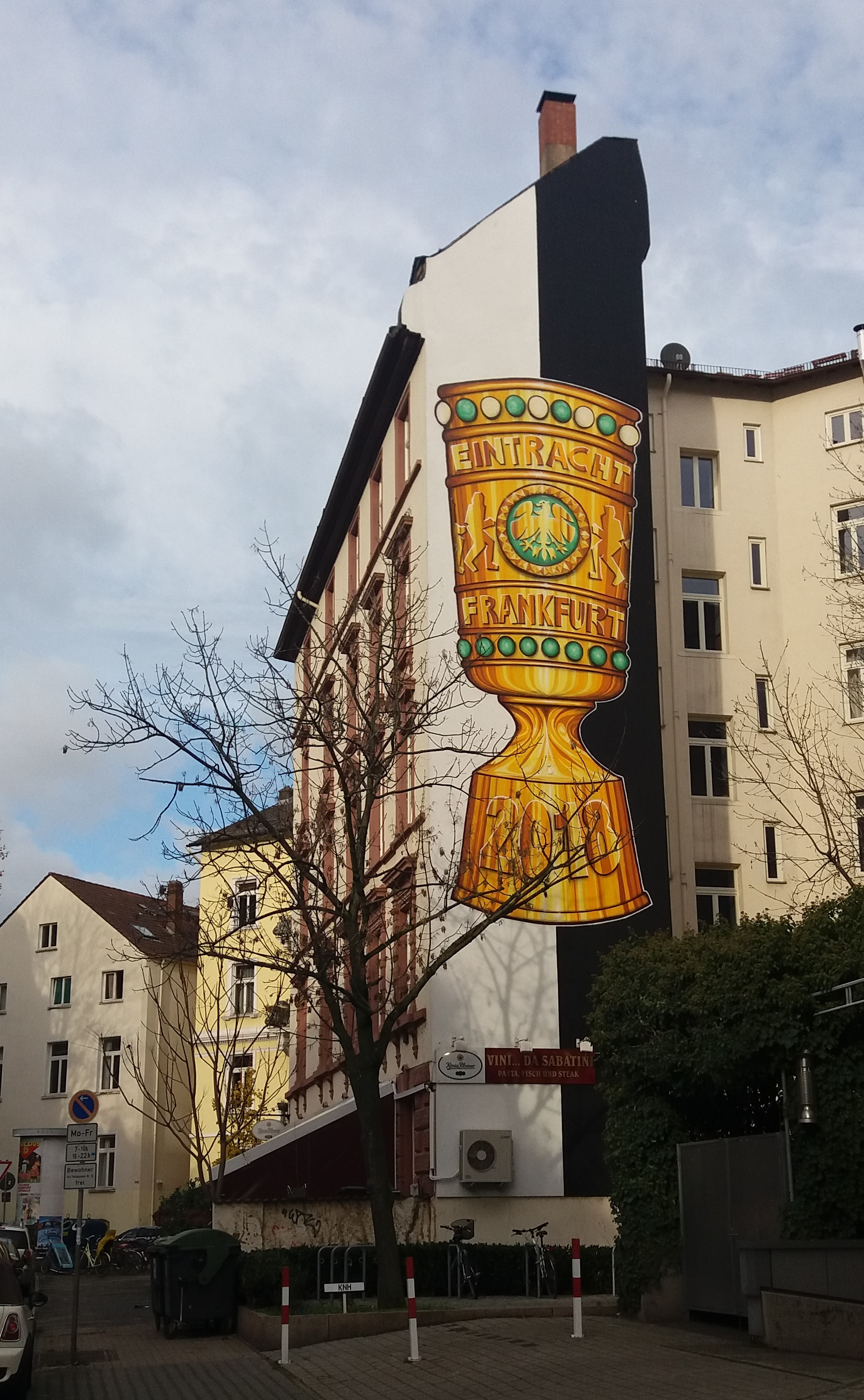
Mural in the Grüneburgweg in Frankfurt to commemorate the 2018 DFB-Pokal victory

- German Championship / Bundesliga
  - Champions: 1958–59
  - Runners-up: 1931–32
  - Third place: 1963–64, 1974–75, 1989–90, 1991–92, 1992–93, 2024–25
- DFB-Pokal
  - Winners: 1973–74, 1974–75, 1980–81, 1987–88, 2017–18
  - Runners-up: 1963–64, 2005–06, 2016–17, 2022–23
- 2. Bundesliga
  - Winners: 1997–98
  - Runners-up: 2011–12
- DFB / DFL-Supercup
  - Runners-up: 1988, 2018
- DFB-Hallenpokal
  - Runners-up: 1988

=== International ===
- European Cup / UEFA Champions League
  - Runners-up: 1959–60
  - Round of 16: 2022–23
- UEFA Cup / UEFA Europa League
  - Winners: 1979–80, 2021–22
  - Semi-finals: 2018–19
- UEFA Cup Winners' Cup
  - Semi-finals: 1975–76
- UEFA Intertoto Cup
  - Winners: 1966–67
  - Runners-up: 1977
- UEFA Super Cup
  - Runners-up: 2022

=== Regional ===
- Southern German Championship
  - Champions: 1929–30, 1931–32
  - Runners-up: 1912–13+, 1913–14+, 1927–28, 1930–31
- Oberliga Süd
  - Champions: 1952–53, 1958–59
  - Runners-up: 1953–54, 1960–61, 1961–62
- Nordkreis-Liga
  - Champions: 1911–12+, 1912–13+, 1913–14+
- Kreisliga Nordmain
  - Winners: 1919–20+, 1920–21
  - Runners-up: 1921–22
- Bezirksliga Main:
  - Runners-up: 1923–24, 1926–27
- Bezirksliga Main-Hessen:
  - Winners: 1927–28, 1928–29, 1929–30, 1930–31, 1931–32
  - Runners-up: 1932–33
- Gauliga Südwest/Mainhessen:
  - Winners: 1937–38
  - Runners-up: 1936–37
- Hesse Cup (Tiers 3-7):
  - Winners: 1946, 1969^{*}
  - Runners-up: 1949
- Hesse Championship (Tier 3, 4 & 5):
  - Champions: 1970^{*}, 2002^{*}, 2023^{*}
  - Runners-up: 1978^{*}, 1983^{*}, 1995^{*}
- + As Frankfurter FV
- ^{*} Achieved by Reserve Team

=== Other ===
==== Friendly ====
- Cup of the Alps
  - Winners: 1967
- Trofeo Conde de Fenosa:
  - Winners: 1972
- Tournoi de Paris:
  - Runners-up: 1981
- Fuji-Cup:
  - Winners: 1992
  - Runners-up: 1994
- Antalya Cup:
  - Winners: 2011
- Frankfurt Main Finance Cup:
  - Winners: 2014, 2015, 2016, 2017
- Trofeo Bortolotti:
  - Winners: 2016, 2022
- Saitama City Cup:
  - Runners-up: 2022
- Orange Trophy:
  - Runners-up: 2024

==== Honours and awards ====
- German Sportsteam of the Year
  - Winner: 2022

==== Youth ====
- German Under 19 championship
  - Champions: 1982, 1983, 1985
  - Runners-up: 1987
- Southern German Under 19 championship
  - Champions: 1970
- Under 19 Hessenliga
  - Champions: 1964, 1965, 1968, 1970, 1976, 1978, 1981, 1982, 1983, 1985, 1986, 1987, 1988, 1990, 1992, 1993, 1994, 1996
- Under 19 Gauliga Hessen-Nassau
  - Champions: 1943
- German Under 17 championship
  - Champions: 1977, 1980, 1991, 2010
  - Runners-up: 1981, 1982
- Southern German Under 17 championship
  - Champions: 1977
- Under 17 Hessenliga
  - Champions: 1977, 1980, 1981, 1982, 1984, 1986, 1987, 1988, 1989, 1991, 1993, 1995, 1996, 1997, 1998, 1999, 2000, 2001, 2004
- Southern German Under 15 championship
  - Champions: 1980, 1989, 1995, 2005, 2009, 2014
  - Runners-up: 2011, 2013, 2015, 2018
- Under 15 Hessenliga
  - Champions: 1976, 1977, 1978, 1979, 1980, 1983, 1985, 1986, 1989, 1990, 1993, 1995, 1997, 1998, 1999, 2001, 2002, 2003, 2004, 2005, 2007, 2008, 2009, 2010
