= 1959 German football championship final =

1959 German championship final
Endspiel um die Deutsche Fußballmeisterschaft
- Match programme cover
- Event: 1959 German football championship
| Eintracht Frankfurt | Kickers Offenbach |
| 5 | 3 |
- After extra time
- Date: 28 June 1959
- Venue: Olympiastadion, Berlin
- Referee: Erich Asmussen (Flensburg)
- Attendance: 75,000

The 1959 German football championship final decided the winner of the 1959 German football championship, the 49th edition of the German football championship, a knockout football cup competition contested by the regional league winners to determine the national champions.

The match was played on 28 June 1959 at the Olympiastadion in Berlin. Eintracht Frankfurt won the match 5–3 after extra time against Kickers Offenbach for their 1st German title. With the win, Eintracht Frankfurt qualified for the 1959–60 European Cup, where they went on to reach the final.

== Route to the final ==
The German football championship was a nine team single-elimination knockout cup competition, featuring the champions and runners-up of the Oberliga Nord, West, Oberliga Südwest, and Oberliga Süd, and the champions of the Oberliga Berlin. The competition started with a qualification round between two teams in order to enter the group stage. During the group phase, four teams played each other in a home and away format, with the group winners advancing to the final.

Note: In all results below, the score of the finalist is given first (H: home; A: away).

| Eintracht Frankfurt | | Round | Kickers Offenbach | |
|---|---|---|---|---|
| Opponent | Result | Group stage | Opponent | Result |
| Werder Bremen | 7–2 (A) | Matchday 1 | Hamburger SV | 3–2 (H) |
| FK Pirmasens | 3–2 (H) | Matchday 2 | Tasmania 1900 Berlin | 2–2 (A) |
| 1. FC Köln | 2–1 (H) | Matchday 3 | Westfalia Herne | 4–1 (A) |
| 1. FC Köln | 4–2 (A) | Matchday 4 | Westfalia Herne | 2–1 (H) |
| FK Pirmasens | 6–2 (A) | Matchday 5 | Tasmania 1900 Berlin | 3–2 (H) |
| Werder Bremen | 4–2 (H) | Matchday 6 | Hamburger SV | 0–1 (A) |
| Group 1 winners: Pos / Team / Pld / Pts; 1 / Eintracht Frankfurt / 6 / 12; 2 / 1. FC Köln / 6 / 5; 3 / FK Pirmasens / 6 / 4; 4 / Werder Bremen / 6 / 3; Source: RSSSF | | Final standings | Group 2 winners: Pos / Team / Pld / Pts; 1 / Kickers Offenbach / 6 / 9; 2 / Hamburger SV / 6 / 8; 3 / Westfalia Herne / 6 / 4; 4 / Tasmania Berlin / 6 / 3; Source: RSSSF | |

== Match ==
=== Details ===
28 June 1959
15:00 CET

| Eintracht Frankfurt | 5–3 (a.e.t.) | Kickers Offenbach |
|---|---|---|
| Sztáni 1', 108'; Feigenspan 14', 92' (pen.), 119' | Report | Kraus 8'; Preisendörfer 23'; Gast 110' |

Olympiastadion, Berlin
Attendance: 75,000
Referee: Erich Asmussen (Flensburg)

| Eintracht Frankfurt | Kickers Offenbach |

| GK | 1 | (West Germany) Egon Loy |
| RB | 2 | (West Germany) Hans-Walter Eigenbrodt |
| CB | 5 | (West Germany) Friedel Lutz |
| LB | 3 | (West Germany) Hermann Höfer |
| RH | 4 | (West Germany) Dieter Stinka |
| LH | 6 | (West Germany) Hans Weilbächer |
| OR | 7 | (West Germany) Richard Kress |
| IR | 8 | (Hungary) István Sztáni |
| CF | 9 | (West Germany) Eckehard Feigenspan |
| IL | 10 | (West Germany) Dieter Lindner |
| OL | 11 | (West Germany) Alfred Pfaff (c) |
Manager:
(West Germany) Paul Oßwald

| GK | 1 | (West Germany) Walter Zimmermann |
| RB | 2 | (West Germany) Karl Waldmann |
| CB | 5 | (West Germany) Heinz Lichtl |
| LB | 3 | (West Germany) Alfred Schultheis |
| RH | 4 | (West Germany) Willi Keim |
| LH | 6 | (West Germany) Ernst Wade |
| OR | 7 | (West Germany) Berti Kraus |
| IR | 8 | (West Germany) Hermann Nuber |
| CF | 9 | (West Germany) Siegfried Gast |
| IL | 10 | (West Germany) Gerhard Kaufhold (c) |
| OL | 11 | (West Germany) Helmut Preisendörfer |
Manager:
(Socialist Federal Republic of Yugoslavia) Bogdan Cuvaj

Match rules

- 90 minutes.
- 30 minutes of extra time if necessary.
- Replay if scores still level.
- No substitutions.
