= Michael Klein =

Michael Klein may refer to:

- Michael Klein (art dealer) (born 1952), American artist’s agent and freelance consultant
- Michael Klein (businessman) (born 1951), Brazilian business executive
- Michael Klein (footballer, born 1959) (1959–93), Romanian football player with Corvinul Hunedoara and Romania
- Michael Klein (footballer, born 1965), German football player with Eintracht Frankfurt
- Michael Klein (World Bank official) (born 1952), German banker
- Michael Klein (writer) (born 1954), American fiction writer, poet, and academic
- Michael L. Klein (born 1940), British-American computational chemist
- Michael R. Klein, American lawyer, co-founder of the Sunlight Foundation in 2006

== See also ==
- Michael Clyne (1939–2010), Australian linguist, academic and intellectual
- Michael Klien (born 1973), Austrian choreographer and artist in Ireland
- Michel Klyne (1781–1868), Canadian employee of North West Company and Hudson's Bay Company
