= Michel Klein =

Michel Klein may refer to:

- Michel Klein (designer) (born 1958), French fashion designer
- Michel Klein (veterinarian) (1921–2024), Romanian-born French veterinarian

== See also ==
- Michael Klein (disambiguation)
