= Ernst Kudrass =

German footballer (1924–2019)

Personal information
- Date of birth: 17 September 1924
- Place of birth: Naselwitz, German Empire; Today Nasławice, Poland
- Date of death: 24 December 2019 (aged 95)
- Position: Defender

Senior career*
Years	Team	Apps	(Gls)
- SV "Manfred von Richthofen" Schweidnitz
- DSV Schweidnitz
1948–1957	Eintracht Frankfurt	262	(4)
1957–1962	Eintracht Frankfurt II		

Managerial career
- 1962–1966: Eintracht Frankfurt II
- Viktoria Urberach
- * Club domestic league appearances and goals

Ernst Kudrass (17 September 1924 – 24 December 2019) was a German footballer. He played club football with Eintracht Frankfurt.

Kudrass played in for his Silesian homeclub SV Manfred von Richthofen Schweidnitz and later DSV Schweidnitz. During World War II he was stationed with the Kriegsmarine in the Mediterranean Sea. He was captured by the British in Trieste and sent to Egypt. After his release he joined Eintracht Frankfurt in 1948.

Firstly deployed as a right midfielder he formed the Eintracht defence couple with Adolf Bechtold.

Arguably his sportive highlights were winning the Oberliga Süd in 1953 and participating in the championship round in 1954. When Eintracht won the Oberliga Süd in 1959 and eventually won the German championship he was officially a squad member but after suffering a leg fracture in 1956 he only regularly played in the reserves team.

The trained plumber took care of coach duties in the reserves team and led the Amateurs to the Gruppenliga, the tier below the Hessenliga. In 1966 he moved with his family to Urberach and trained local side Viktoria Urberach.

In this late life Ernst Kudrass remained a regular visitor of the first team and Eintracht reserves and regularly attended Eintracht museum events.

== Honours ==
- Oberliga Süd: 1952–53; runners-up 1953–54

== Sources ==
- Matheja, Ulrich (2011). Unsere Eintracht - Eintracht Frankfurt - Die Chronik. Die Werkstatt. ISBN 978-3-89533-750-5.
