= Nasławice, Lower Silesian Voivodeship =

Nasławice
- Village
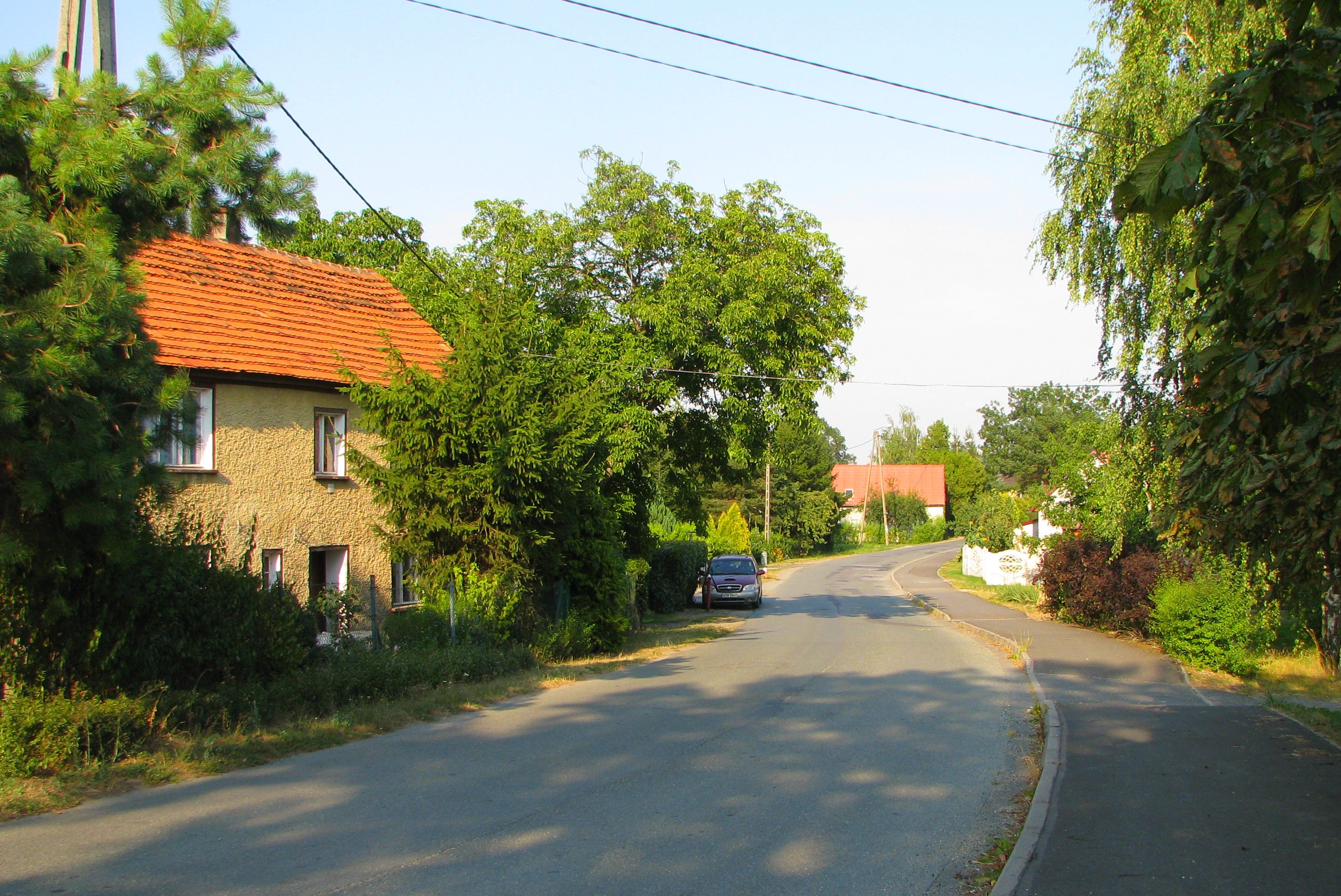

- Location within Poland
- Coordinates: 50°53′21″N 16°48′32″E
- Country: Poland
- Voivodeship: Lower Silesian
- County: Wrocław
- Gmina: Sobótka
- Population: 000,000

Nasławice [naswaˈvit͡sɛ] is a village in the administrative district of Gmina Sobótka, within Wrocław County, Lower Silesian Voivodeship, in south-western Poland.
