= Michael Klein (World Bank official) =

Michael Klein is an author, and former World Bank official. Klein has published and co-authored several policy papers on the emerging markets and the effectiveness of foreign aid.

He has regularly argued for enabling the private sector to bring about economic development rather than direct aid to the poorest nations. A paper he co-authored with Tim Harford in 2005, says:

Private financial flows such as foreign direct investment seem to encourage economic growth and relieve poverty in part because they create excellent incentives for transferring know-how and in part because they are subject to a stern market test that ensures they are allocated and monitored carefully. For aid flows, not automatically subject to these disciplines, it is difficult to be as effective. This Note argues that aid agencies, by learning what makes private flows so effective, can bring better aid to the poorest.

== Education and personal life ==
Klein is a German national and joined the World Bank as a youth through the Young Professionals program. He retired in 2009.
