= Friedrich Claus =

German association football player

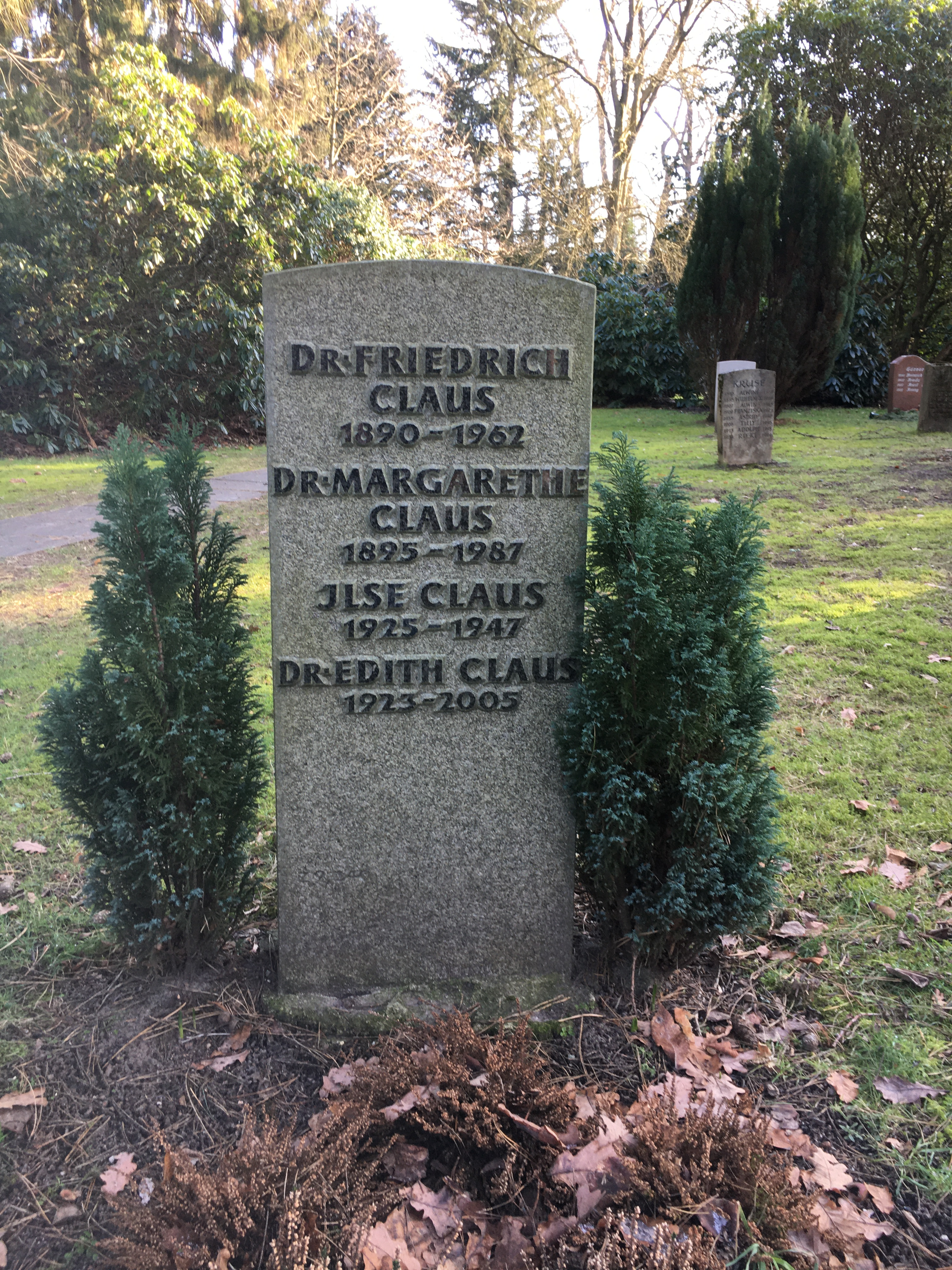
- Tombstone of Friedrich Claus

Personal information
- Date of birth: 18 March 1890
- Place of birth: Frankfurt, Germany
- Date of death: 16 May 1962 (aged 72)
- Place of death: West Germany
- Position: Defender

Youth career
- 1906–1910: Frankfurter Kickers

Senior career*
Years	Team	Apps	(Gls)
1910–1914	Frankfurter Kickers / FFV		
1918	FFV		
- * Club domestic league appearances and goals

Friedrich Claus (18 March 1890 – 16 May 1962) was a German footballer. He played club football as a defender for Frankfurter Kickers who later merged with Victoria Frankfurt to form Frankfurter Fußball-Verein Kickers-Victoria, a predecessor of Eintracht Frankfurt. Claus won with FFV three Nordkreis-Liga championships in a row from 1912 to 1914 and finished a South German runners-up twice in 1913 and 1914. Claus filled several executives position at Kickers and FFV. Claus studied medicine in Marburg and also played for VfB Marburg's academical team. In May 1914 he moved to Hamburg to practise medicine. The farewell celebration after his last FFV match, a 6-1 win in an exhibition against Borussia Erfurt, turned out so excessive that team missed the train to Leipzig where they were supposed to play another match.

Claus fought in World War I and in 1916 he was transferred from Flanders to Mesopotamia. In December 1918 he played once again for FFV.

Until his death on 16 May 1962 he was honorary captain at Eintracht Frankfurt.

== Honours ==
- Nordkreis-Liga
  - Champion: 1911–12, 1912–13, 1913–14
- Southern German Championship
  - Runner-up: 1912–13, 1913–14

== Sources ==
- Matheja, Ulrich (2011). Unsere Eintracht - Eintracht Frankfurt - Die Chronik. Die Werkstatt. ISBN 978-3-89533-750-5.
