= Helmut Henig =

German footballer (1921–1996)

Personal information
- Date of birth: 12 August 1921
- Place of birth: Frankfurt, Germany
- Date of death: 4 August 1996 (aged 74)
- Place of death: Germany
- Position: Goalkeeper

Youth career
- –1937: VfB Riederwald
- 1937–1939: Eintracht Frankfurt

Senior career*
Years	Team	Apps	(Gls)
1939–1945	Eintracht Frankfurt	16?	
1945	VfB Riederwald		
1945	Eintracht Frankfurt	5	(0)
1946	Rot-Weiß Frankfurt		
1946–1947	FSV Frankfurt		
1947	TSG Ulm 1846		
1947–1954	Eintracht Frankfurt	215	(0)
1954–1956	TSG Ulm 1846		
1956–1957	SG Dietzenbach		
1957–1959	Eintracht Frankfurt	8	(0)
- * Club domestic league appearances and goals

Helmut Henig (12 August 1921 – 4 August 1996) was a German footballer. He played club football with Eintracht Frankfurt, Rot-Weiß Frankfurt, FSV Frankfurt and TSG Ulm 1846.

== Career ==
=== Early career - until 1947 ===
Henig joined Eintracht Frankfurt in 1937 from VfB Riederwald aged 16 years old. He got his first team experience between 1939–40 and 1943–44 in the Gauliga Südwest. During the time of World War II he made 16 league appearances under Péter Szabó. When the war was over, Henig has had a hectic period of club changes. Starting with his first club VfB Riederwald November 1945 he re-joined Eintracht for two months in the first season of Oberliga Süd, playing 5 league matches. Then joining Hessian amateurs Rot-Weiss Frankfurt from January to March 1946, followed by a move to FSV Frankfurt's Bornheimer Hang where he played from March 1946 to February 1947 next former Germany international Willibald Kreß for the Black and Blue, appearing 17 times in Oberliga matches. Due to his sudden move to TSG Ulm 1846 in March until the 1946-47 season's end in July 1947 he could add 17 further Oberliga appearances. On 6 July 1947 he kept the Ulm goal at the 0-3 loss at Eintracht, facing his goalie counterpart Toni Turek who played for the Riederwald team. On 8 June he was a strong backing for Ulm' 1-0 home win against his former club FSV Frankfurt where Willibald Kreß was displaying his goalkeeping class. For the 1947-48 campaign Eintracht Frankfurt and Ulm 46 swapped goalkeepers: Turek went to Ulm and Henig returned home to Frankfurt.

=== Starting goalkeeper at Eintracht, 1947 to 1954 ===
In the first seasons Henig and Eintracht finished in the league's midfield: In 1949 (13th position) and in 1950 (14th position) the team even fought against relegation. Around Christmas 1950 Eintracht travelled to Spain to play exhibitions against Atlético de Madrid (4-3) and Sevilla (3-5). With the new coach Kurt Windmann Eintracht pushed back in 1951 and finished on 8th. Henig only missed one of 34 matches in that season. In May 1951 Eintracht started a journey to the USA until June, organised by the German American soccer association (DAFB), playing eight games between 6 and 30 May. In the 1951–52 season the team climbed to the 4th rank and in 1952-53 the Eagles finished a point ahead 1952 German champions VfB Stuttgart, winning the South German championship. In the 15 home matches Eintracht accounted twelve wins and only lost three points with drawing three times. Henig guarded the goal of the South German champions in all 30 league matches. The final group stage started off well for Henig's Eintracht with two victories against 1. FC Köln (2-0) and Holstein Kiel (1-0). However, in the third group stage on 17 May 1953 1. FC Kaiserslautern won at Eintracht's Waldstadion with 68,000 spectators thanks to a Ottmar Walter goal. FCK also on the second leg in Ludwigshafen and advanced to the final. In the last group match of the season Henig kept a clean sheet on 7 June at 1. FC Köln and Germany coach Sepp Herberger rewarded him for his outstanding season performances with calling him up for Germany B on 14 June in Düsseldorf versus Spain. Two months before turning 32 he debuted with an impressive 5-2 victory, two of Germany's goals were scored by Alfred Pfaff, Henig's club teammate and Eintracht playmaker. Pfaff was called to Germany's A team on 19 August 1953.

Henig played for a West Germany XI on 2 September 1953 in Konstanz against a Switzerland XI. The other DFB starters were Werner Liebrich, Herbert Erhardt, Herbert Schäfer, Richard Gottinger, Fritz Semmelmann, Bernhard Klodt, Max Morlock, Horst Schade and Alfred Pfaff. Sepp Herberger's West Germany won 2-0. Henig was called up on 11 October 1953 to the preliminary World Cup qualifier squad when West Germany played Saarland in Stuttgart. Toni Turek played the match, with his understudy Fritz Herkenrath on the bench.

As South German title holders, Eintracht finished as runners-up in the season that saw 1954 World Cup. This was achieved after a close triple-header with VfB Stuttgart und Kickers Offenbach. Henig only missed out on one of the 30 Oberliga matches when Eintracht conceded the fewest goals with 31. Due to the 1954 World Cup, the final championship round was played in a shortened form. Henig played two final round matches against 1. FC Kaiserslautern (0-1) and 1. FC Köln (2-3) and left Frankfurt for 2. Oberliga Süd side Ulm 1846. Eintracht replaced Henig with Egon Loy.

=== Finale and Oberliga Süd once again, 1954 to 1959 ===
The experienced goalie spent two seasons in the second tier with Ulm from 1954 to 1956. He returned to Hessen to join SG Dietzenbach preparing his football retirement. But instead Henig returned to Eintracht Frankfurt reserves in 1957. Because of an injury of regular goalkeeper Loy the 37 year old Henig played the first eight Oberliga Süd matches in 1958–59. During these matches Eintracht collected 11-5 points and 21-9 goals and sat in the table on 4th. Loy returned to the Eintracht goal on 19 October for the 1-4-loss at Bayern Munich. Eintracht Frankfurt won the South championship, advanced through final group stage and won the final match 5-3 after extra time in a derby against Kickers Offenbach. Henig ended his career in the summer of 1959 after 259 Oberliga Süd matches his active career.

== Honours ==
- Oberliga Süd
  - Winner: 1952–53, 1958–59
  - Runner-up: 1953–54

== Sources ==
- Matheja, Ulrich (2011). Unsere Eintracht - Eintracht Frankfurt - Die Chronik. Die Werkstatt. ISBN 978-3-89533-750-5.
