= Willi Kraus =

German footballer (1943–2008)

Personal information
- Date of birth: 1 May 1943
- Place of birth: Germany
- Date of death: 19 October 2008 (aged 65)
- Place of death: Westerwald, Germany
- Position: Forward

Youth career
- –1963: Schalke 04

Senior career*
Years	Team	Apps	(Gls)
1963	Schalke 04	1	(0)
1963–1964	Go Ahead Eagles	28	(0)
1964–1966	Tennis Borussia Berlin		
1966–1968	Schalke 04	36	(16)
1968–1969	Eintracht Gelsenkirchen	5	(1)
- * Club domestic league appearances and goals

Willi Kraus (1 May 1943 – 19 October 2008) was a German professional footballer who played for two seasons in the Bundesliga with FC Schalke 04.

Kraus came through the youth ranks of Schalke 04, making his Oberliga debut as a 19-year-old on 10 April 1963 in a match against TSV Marl-Hüls. Having made one appearance for Schalke, Kraus moved to the Netherlands the following season and played for the Deventer-based team Go Ahead Eagles. He came back to Germany in 1964, signing for Regionalliga team Tennis Borussia Berlin and moved back to Schalke in 1966. Over two seasons in the Bundesliga, Kraus scored 16 goals in 36 top flight appearances, helping the team against their relegation struggles. The striker, who did not shy away from tackling his footballing opponents, was known for not pulling his punches. He was as unpredictable in the penalty area as he was in his private life. Kraus missed the first two months of the 1967–68 Bundesliga season after breaking his arm in two places following a car crash in the Netherlands. Soon afterwards, he brutally attacked the barman at a local café; the club fining him 250 Deutsche Mark for "unsportsmanlike moral conduct". Kraus promised to right his wrongs, and on his comeback to the side, scored nine goals in 12 games. The club, however, fired the player in February 1968 after the police had stopped his car and found goods stolen from a burglary, including break-in tools, a loaded gun and bottles of propane gas used for welding open vaults.

As a result of the player's escapades, 1. FC Kaiserslautern and Wuppertaler SV, who had both offered Kraus a contract for the following season, reneged on their deals. Kraus signed for neighbouring club Eintracht Gelsenkirchen. A year later, on 17 September 1969, Kraus was arrested, along with two other criminals, for robbing a string of kiosks in the Osnabrück area. Eintracht Gelsenkirchen terminated his contract, and Kraus was sentenced in 1969 to seven years in prison for bank robbery. For other robberies, he was sentenced to five and ten years respectively.

Having spent most of his life in and out of prison, Kraus was due to appear before court again in Essen, in November 2008, on weapon offence charges, but died a month beforehand, on 19 October 2008, at his home in the Westerwald.
