= Hans Bauer (footballer) =

German footballer

Personal information
- Date of birth: 28 July 1927
- Place of birth: Sendling, Munich, Germany
- Date of death: 31 October 1997 (aged 70)
- Place of death: Munich, Germany
- Height: 1.72 m (5 ft 7 1/2 in)
- Position: Defender

Youth career
- 1937–1946: MTV München

Senior career*
Years	Team	Apps	(Gls)
1946–1948	Wacker München		
1948–1959	Bayern Munich	259	(12)

International career
1951–1958	West Germany	5	(0)
Medal record
Representing West Germany
FIFA World Cup
Winner	1954 Switzerland
- * Club domestic league appearances and goals

Hans Bauer (28 July 1927 – 31 October 1997) was a German footballer. Most of his career was spent with Bayern Munich, where he played as a defender and won the DFB-Pokal in 1957.

Alert and with fast reactions, the position of the left-footed Bauer was mostly that of a left full back. He played five times in the Germany national team between 1951 and 1958. The highlight of his career was being included in the squad for the 1954 World Cup.
