= Friedel Lutz =

German footballer (1939–2023)

Personal information
- Full name: Alfred Lutz
- Date of birth: 21 January 1939
- Place of birth: Bad Vilbel, Gau Hesse-Nassau, Germany
- Date of death: 7 February 2023 (aged 84)
- Place of death: Bad Vilbel
- Height: 1.78 m (5 ft 10 in)
- Position: Full-back

Youth career
- 1950–1957: FV Bad Vilbel

Senior career*
Years	Team	Apps	(Gls)
1957–1963	Eintracht Frankfurt ^{(OL Süd)}	124	(4)
1963–1966	Eintracht Frankfurt ^{(BL)}	74	(0)
1966–1967	1860 Munich	11	(0)
1967–1973	Eintracht Frankfurt	126	(4)
1973–1974	TuS Makkabi Frankfurt		
1974	SpVgg Neu-Isenburg		
1987	FC Rhein-Main		

International career
1960–1966	West Germany	12	(0)
Medal record
Men's football
Representing West Germany
FIFA World Cup
Runner-up	1966 England
- * Club domestic league appearances and goals

Alfred "Friedel" Lutz (21 January 1939 – 7 February 2023) was a German professional footballer who played as a full-back. He spent most of his career with Eintracht Frankfurt. At international level, he made 12 appearances for the West Germany national team.

== Club career ==
Lutz was born in Bad Vilbel, Germany. He joined Eintracht Frankfurt in 1955 and carried on playing for the club until 1973. With Eintracht Frankfurt, he reached the 1959–60 European Cup final which Frankfurt lost 7–3 against Real Madrid. For the 1966–67 season he joined then Bundesliga title-holder 1860 Munich, but returned to Eintracht Frankfurt after a single injury plagued season.

== International career ==
Debuting for the West Germany national team on 3 August 1960 in Iceland, a major injury prevented him from taking part in the 1962 FIFA World Cup for his country. However, he won a runner-up medal with the West Germans four years later at the 1966 FIFA World Cup. Lutz retired from playing for West Germany after that tournament, making his final appearance in the semi-final win over the Soviet Union (2–1). Overall he won 12 caps.

== Personal life and death ==
Lutz was married and had a son. He died on 7 February 2023, at the age of 84.
