= Hans Wloka =

German footballer

Personal information
- Full name: Hans Wloka
- Date of birth: March 8, 1925
- Place of birth: Gogolin, German Empire; Today Poland
- Date of death: April 8, 1976 (aged 51)
- Place of death: Frankfurt, West Germany
- Positions: Defender; midfielder

Youth career
- Vorwärts-Rasensport Gleiwitz

Senior career*
Years	Team	Apps	(Gls)
1948–1957	Eintracht Frankfurt	191	(2)
1957–1958	SKV Mörfelden		
1958–1959	Viktoria Preußen		
- * Club domestic league appearances and goals

Hans Wloka (8 March 1925 – 8 April 1976) was a German footballer.

He played for Eintracht Frankfurt from 1947 to 1957.

== Honours ==
- Oberliga Süd: 1952–53; runners-up 1953–54
