= Hermann Höfer =

German footballer (1934–1996)

Personal information
- Full name: Hermann Höfer
- Date of birth: 19 July 1934
- Date of death: 22 October 1996 (aged 62)
- Position: Defender

Youth career
- 1949–1953: Eintracht Frankfurt

Senior career*
Years	Team	Apps	(Gls)
1953–1967	Eintracht Frankfurt	311	(19)
- * Club domestic league appearances and goals

Hermann "Stift" Höfer (19 July 1934 – 22 October 1996) was a German football player who played his entire career for Eintracht Frankfurt.

Höfer joined the Frankfurt side as a 15-year-old and debuted in 1953. Until 1966, the defender gathered over 300 appearances. Wearing the Eintracht jersey he won the German championship in 1959. He also played at the 1956 Summer Olympics.

From 1963 until 1966 he played 68 times in the new founded Bundesliga. In the 1981–82 season, he was vice president of the Eagles.

== Honours ==
- German championship: 1958–59
- European Cup: runners-up 1959–60
- Oberliga Süd: 1958–59; runners-up 1953–54, 1960–61, 1961–62
- DFB-Pokal: runners-up 1963–64
- UEFA Intertoto Cup: 1966–67
