= Alfred Kraus =

German footballer

Personal information
- Date of birth: 16 January 1924
- Place of birth: Frankfurt, German Empire
- Date of death: 17 March 2005 (aged 81)
- Place of death: Frankfurt, Germany
- Position: Forward

Youth career
- 1935–1940: Eintracht Frankfurt

Senior career*
Years	Team	Apps	(Gls)
1940–1947	Eintracht Frankfurt	57	(55)
1947–1949	SpVgg Langenselbold		
1949–1952	Eintracht Frankfurt	35	(12)
- * Club domestic league appearances and goals

Alfred Kraus (16 January 1924 – 17 March 2005) was a German footballer. He played club football with Eintracht Frankfurt.

Alfred Kraus, nicknamed Bubi, debuted in 1941, aged 17 in a cup tie at GfL Darmstadt and right away scored 4 goals. From 1941 until 1944 he was Eintracht's top goal scorer with 20 goals or more. In the same year a newspaper report about his goalscoring touch against Hanau 93 almost caused him trouble. This report had been put in his health registration and his name underlined in red which meant that a person was supposed to be drafted to the World War II front line.

During a second physical examination the sergeant left Kraus alone and hid the underlined newspaper report in his chest pocket. In 2003 Kraus stated that he still owns this newspaper report. In 1942 Eintracht caretaker Willi Balles managed to move Kraus from his assignment in a march battalion to another one as court clerk in Frankfurt where he could continue playing football. In April 1943 Eintracht played a cup match against TSG Bensheim and Kraus scored 11 goals in a 14-0 victory.

After World War II continued to play for Eintracht Frankfurt, only interrupted by a two season stint at Langenselbold.In Frankfurt am Main, goalkeeper Toni Turek, who went on to become world champion in 1954 and also a “football god”, was temporarily one of his teammates. He worked as an accountant and ended his active football career in 1952.

For many year Bubi Kraus, fellow Eintracht footballer Adolf Bechtold and track and field athlete Heinz Ulzheimer kept a tradition of playing tennis once a week at Eintracht club house in Riederwald. Bubi Kraus was honorary member at Eintracht Frankfurt.

== Sources ==
- Matheja, Ulrich (2011). Unsere Eintracht - Eintracht Frankfurt - Die Chronik. Die Werkstatt. ISBN 978-3-89533-750-5.
