= Hans Weilbächer =

German footballer (1933–2022)

Personal information
- Date of birth: 23 October 1933
- Place of birth: Hattersheim am Main, Hesse, Germany
- Date of death: 1 August 2022 (aged 88)
- Position: Midfielder

Youth career
- 1945–1952: SV Hattersheim
- 1952–1953: Eintracht Frankfurt

Senior career*
Years	Team	Apps	(Gls)
1952–1965	Eintracht Frankfurt	241	(48)

International career
1955	West Germany	1	(0)
- * Club domestic league appearances and goals

Hans Weilbächer (23 October 1933 – 1 August 2022) was a German footballer who played as a midfielder. He was capped once for the West Germany national team in 1955 against Republic of Ireland. With his club side Eintracht Frankfurt, he won the German championship in 1959 and reached the European Cup final in the following year against Real Madrid which the Eagles lost.

== Honours ==
Eintracht Frankfurt

- European Cup/UEFA Champions League
  - Runner-up: 1959–60
- German Championship
  - Winner: 1959
- DFB-Pokal
  - Runner-up: 1963–64
- Oberliga Süd
  - Winner: 1952–53, 1958–59
  - Runner-up: 1953–54, 1960–61, 1961–62
