= Horst Schade =

German footballer and manager

Personal information
- Date of birth: 10 July 1922
- Place of birth: Döbeln, Germany
- Date of death: 28 February 1968 (aged 45)
- Position: Forward

Senior career*
Years	Team	Apps	(Gls)
1941–1943	Dresdner SC		
1943–1945	Döbelner SC		
1946–1947	FC Haidhof		
1948–1953	SpVgg Fürth		
1953–1956	1. FC Nürnberg		

International career
1951–1953	West Germany	3	(1)

Managerial career
- 1958–1963: FSV Bayreuth
- * Club domestic league appearances and goals

Horst Schade (10 July 1922 – 28 February 1968) was a German football player and manager.

Schade began his career with Dresdner SC in 1941, and went on to play for Döbelner SC, FC Haidhof, SpVgg Fürth and 1. FC Nürnberg. He was also capped three times for the West Germany national team.
