= Hubert Schieth =

German footballer (1927–2013)

Personal information
- Date of birth: 26 January 1927
- Place of birth: Obersayn, Germany
- Date of death: 19 February 2013 (aged 86)
- Position: Forward

Youth career
- –1947: Blau-Weiss Obersayn

Senior career*
Years	Team	Apps	(Gls)
1947–1949	1. Rödelheimer FC 02		
1949–1953	Eintracht Frankfurt	103	(45)
1953–1961	Schwarz-Weiss Essen		

Managerial career
- 1961–1963: SSV Hagen
- 1963–1967: VfL Bochum
- 1969–1971: SG Wattenscheid 09
- 1971–1975: SG Wattenscheid 09 (general manager)
- 1975–1977: Schwarz-Weiss Essen
- 1977–1981: SG Wattenscheid 09
- 1981–1983: VfL Bochum (general manager)
- BV Lüttringhausen (general manager)
- Bayer Leverkusen (general manager)
Medal record
1. Rödelheimer FC 02
Winner	Landesliga Hessen	1947–48
Eintracht Frankfurt
Winner	Oberliga Süd	1952–53
Schwarz-Weiss Essen
Runner-up	2. Oberliga West	1958–59
Winner	DFB-Pokal	1958–59
Winner	2. Oberliga West	1960–61
- * Club domestic league appearances and goals

Hubert Schieth (26 January 1927 – 19 February 2013) was a German football player and manager who played as a forward.

== Career ==
=== Statistics ===
Club performance			League		Cup		Total	
Season	Club	League	Apps	Goals	Apps	Goals	Apps	Goals
West Germany			League		DFB-Pokal		Total	
1947–48	1. Rödelheimer FC 02	Landesliga Hessen			—			
1948–49	1. Rödelheimer FC 02	Oberliga Süd			—			
1949–50	Eintracht Frankfurt	Oberliga Süd	28	15	—		28	15
1950–51	Eintracht Frankfurt	Oberliga Süd	31	9	—		31	9
1951–52	Eintracht Frankfurt	Oberliga Süd	22	11	—		22	11
1952–53	Eintracht Frankfurt	Oberliga Süd	22	10	—		22	10
1953–54	Schwarz-Weiss Essen	Oberliga West			—			
1954–55	Schwarz-Weiss Essen	Oberliga West			—			
1955–56	Schwarz-Weiss Essen	Oberliga West			—			
1956–57	Schwarz-Weiss Essen	Oberliga West			—			
1957–58	Schwarz-Weiss Essen	2. Oberliga West			—			
1958–59	Schwarz-Weiss Essen	2. Oberliga West			3	1		
1959–60	Schwarz-Weiss Essen	Oberliga West			—			
1960–61	Schwarz-Weiss Essen	2. Oberliga West			—			
Total	West Germany				3	1		
Career total					3	1		
