= Werner Heilig =

German footballer

Personal information
- Full name: Werner Heilig
- Date of birth: 20 October 1921
- Date of death: 29 January 1987 (aged 65)
- Position: Midfielder

Youth career
- 1933–1939: Eintracht Frankfurt

Senior career*
Years	Team	Apps	(Gls)
1939–1957	Eintracht Frankfurt	355	(53)
- * Club domestic league appearances and goals

Werner Heilig (20 October 1921 – 29 January 1987) was a German footballer.

He played for Eintracht Frankfurt from 1939 to 1957.

== Honours ==
- Oberliga Süd: 1952–53; runners-up 1953–54
