= Richard Kress =

German footballer (1925–1996)

Personal information
- Date of birth: 6 March 1925
- Place of birth: Niesig (today part of Fulda), Weimar Republic
- Date of death: 30 March 1996 (aged 71)
- Place of death: Frankfurt, Germany
- Position: Striker

Senior career*
Years	Team	Apps	(Gls)
1935–1953	FV 1910 Horas		
1953–1964	Eintracht Frankfurt	291	(70)

International career
1954–1961	West Germany	9	(2)
- * Club domestic league appearances and goals

Richard Kress (alternative writing Richard Kreß) (6 March 1925 – 30 March 1996) was a German footballer.

== Club career ==
Kress played for Eintracht Frankfurt from 1953 until 1964 as a typical right winger. He won the 1959 German football championship, and played in the 1960 European Cup final which was lost to Real Madrid 7–3 on 18 May at Hampden Park in Glasgow in front of 135,000 spectators, in which he scored the first goal of the match.

Kress was the oldest player to make his debut in the newly formed Bundesliga against Kaiserslautern on 24 August 1963, aged 38 years and 171 days.

== International career ==
Kress was capped nine times for Germany between 1954 and 1961 contributing two goals. When he scored his first goal – against Northern Ireland in World Cup qualifying on May 10, 1961 – he was 36 years and 65 days old, making him the oldest debut goalscorer of the national team to this day.

== Honours ==
Eintracht Frankfurt

- German championship: 1958–59
- European Cup runner-up: 1959–60
- Oberliga Süd: 1958–59; runner-up 1953–54, 1960–61, 1961–62
- DFB-Pokal runner-up: 1963–64
