= Adolf Bechtold =

German footballer

Personal information
- Full name: Adolf Bechtold
- Date of birth: 20 February 1926
- Place of birth: Frankfurt, Germany
- Date of death: 8 September 2012 (aged 86)
- Place of death: Frankfurt, Germany
- Position: Defender

Youth career
- 1938–1942: Eintracht Frankfurt

Senior career*
Years	Team	Apps	(Gls)
1942–1960	Eintracht Frankfurt	397	(3)
- * Club domestic league appearances and goals

Adolf Bechtold (20 February 1926 – 8 September 2012) was a German football player who spent his entire career with Eintracht Frankfurt. He later joined the club's youth academy in 1938. He played there until 1942 before moving up to the senior squad. He made over 400 appearances for Frankfurt until 1960 and won the German Championship in 1959, as well as the South German Championship in 1953 and 1959. In the 1959-60 season, in the twilight of his career, Frankfurt reached the final of the European Cup where they were defeated by Real Madrid with a score of 7-3. Bechtold made only one appearance in that European Cup season before retiring as an honored member and former captain of Eintracht Frankfurt.

== Honours ==
- German championship: 1958–59
- European Cup: runners-up 1959–60
- Oberliga Süd: 1952–53, 1958–59; runners-up 1953–54

== See also ==
- One-club man
