= 1953–54 Oberliga =

Oberliga
- Season: 1953–54
- Champions: Hannover 96; Berliner SV 92; 1. FC Köln; 1. FC Kaiserslautern; VfB Stuttgart
- Relegated: VfB Lübeck; Victoria Hamburg; Hertha Zehlendorf; Kickers 1900 Berlin; Rheydter SV; STV Horst-Emscher; ASV Landau; VfR Kirn; SV Waldhof Mannheim; Viktoria Aschaffenburg
- German champions: Hannover 96; 2nd German title
- Top goalscorer: Herbert Martin (35 goals)

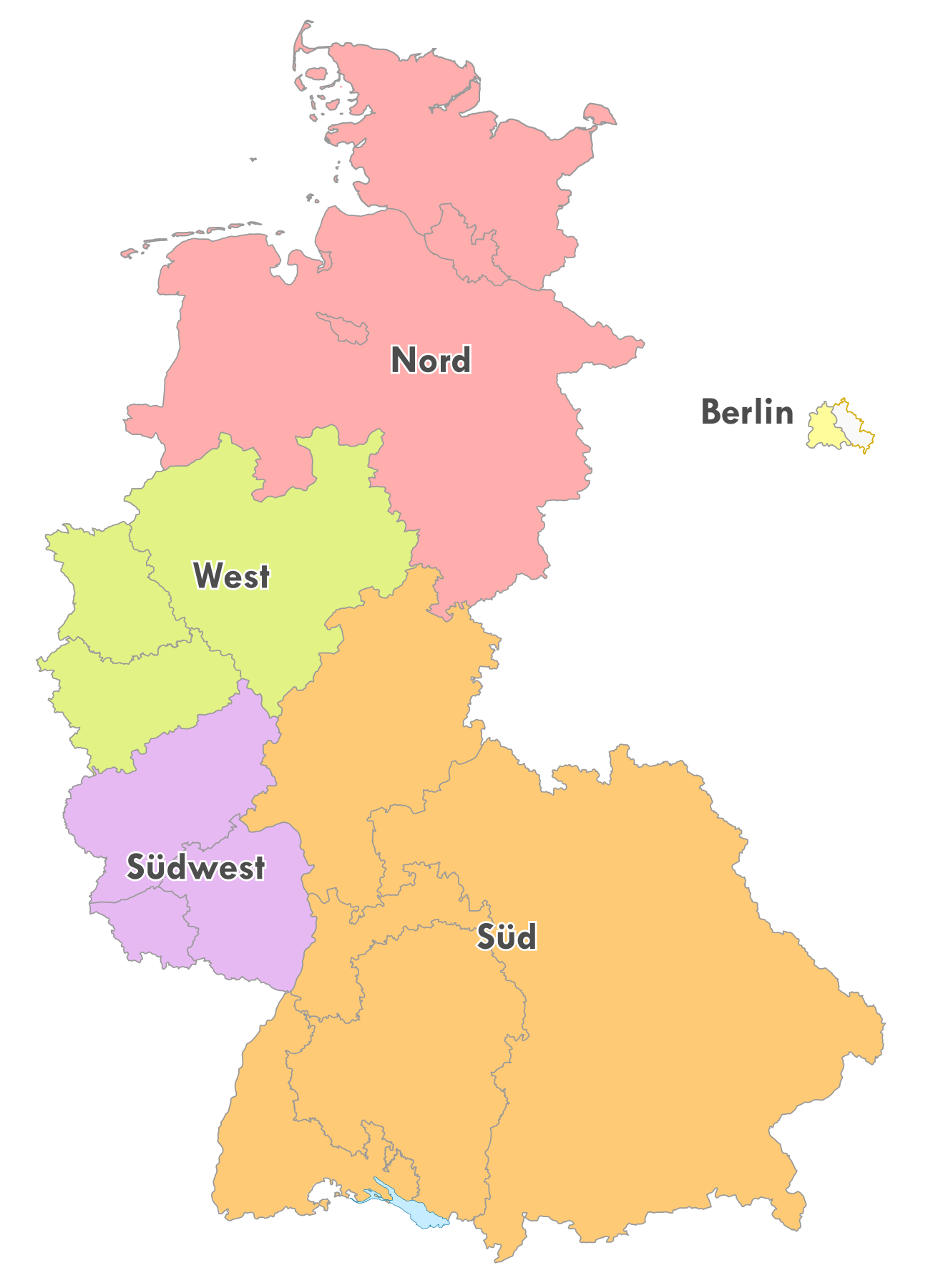
Map of the five German Oberligas 1945 to 1963

The 1953–54 Oberliga was the ninth season of the Oberliga, the first tier of the football league system in West Germany and the Saar Protectorate. The league operated in five regional divisions, Berlin, North, South, Southwest and West. The five league champions and the runners-up from the south then entered the 1954 German football championship which was won by Hannover 96. It was Hannover's second national championship, having previously won it in 1938 in an epic final against FC Schalke 04 that saw two extra time games before Hannover won 4–3.

Hannover 96 equaled the Oberliga start record set in 1952–53 by 1. FC Köln, winning its first eleven games, a mark later equaled by Hamburger SV in 1961–62 but never surpassed.

A similar-named league, the DDR-Oberliga, existed in East Germany, set at the first tier of the East German football league system. The 1953–54 DDR-Oberliga was won by Turbine Erfurt.

== Oberliga Nord ==
The 1953–54 season saw two new clubs in the league, Eintracht Braunschweig and Victoria Hamburg, both promoted from the Amateurliga. The league's top scorer was Fritz Apel (Arminia Hannover) and Werner Heitkamp (FC St. Pauli) with 21 goals each. Hannover 96 became the only team other than Hamburger SV to win the Oberliga Nord as the latter won 15 of the possible 16 league championships from 1947 to 1963 but missed out in 1953–54.

Pos	Team	Pld	W	D	L	GF	GA	GD	Pts	Promotion, qualification or relegation
1	Hannover 96 (C)	30	20	6	4	64	26	+38	46	Qualification to German championship
2	FC St. Pauli	30	16	7	7	65	37	+28	39	
3	FC Altona 93	30	13	6	11	68	59	+9	32	
4	Eintracht Braunschweig	30	12	8	10	57	58	−1	32	
5	Werder Bremen	30	13	5	12	53	43	+10	31	
6	Arminia Hannover	30	12	5	13	78	77	+1	29	
7	TuS Bremerhaven 93	30	11	7	12	53	55	−2	29	
8	Eimsbütteler TV	30	11	7	12	51	55	−4	29	
9	Holstein Kiel	30	10	9	11	50	68	−18	29	
10	Göttingen 05	30	10	8	12	43	48	−5	28	
11	Hamburger SV	30	12	8	10	77	58	+19	28 (Note: Hamburger SV deducted four points for illegal payments to player Willi Schröder.)	
12	VfL Osnabrück	30	11	5	14	48	46	+2	27	
13	Bremer SV	30	11	5	14	44	56	−12	27	
14	Harburger TB	30	10	6	14	43	60	−17	26	
15	VfB Lübeck (R)	30	7	9	14	33	59	−26	23	Relegation to Amateurliga
16	Victoria Hamburg (R)	30	7	8	15	28	50	−22	22	Relegation to Amateurliga

Source: RSSSF.com
Rules for classification: 1) Points;
(C) Champions; (R) Relegated

== Oberliga Berlin ==
The 1953–54 season saw two new clubs in the league, Kickers 1900 Berlin and Hertha Zehlendorf, both promoted from the Amateurliga Berlin. The league's top scorer was Hermann Paul of Berliner SV 1892 with 19 goals.

Pos	Team	Pld	W	D	L	GF	GA	GD	Pts	Promotion, qualification or relegation
1	Berliner SV 92	22	15	4	3	58	29	+29	34	Qualification to German championship
2	Minerva 93 Berlin	22	14	3	5	59	40	+19	31	
3	Union 06 Berlin	22	12	6	4	45	30	+15	30	
4	Spandauer SV	22	12	3	7	45	35	+10	27	
5	Alemannia 90 Berlin	22	11	4	7	44	36	+8	26	
6	Tennis Borussia Berlin	22	8	8	6	38	30	+8	24	
7	Viktoria 89 Berlin	22	9	3	10	51	42	+9	21	
8	BFC Nordstern	22	7	5	10	34	40	−6	19	
9	Wacker 04 Berlin	22	6	5	11	29	36	−7	17	
10	Blau-Weiß 90 Berlin	22	5	6	11	39	47	−8	16	
11	Hertha Zehlendorf (R)	22	4	6	12	23	50	−27	14	Relegation to Amateurliga Berlin
12	Kickers 1900 Berlin (R)	22	0	5	17	19	69	−50	5	Relegation to Amateurliga Berlin

Source: RSSSF.com
Rules for classification: 1) Points;
(R) Relegated

== Oberliga West ==
The 1953–54 season saw two new clubs in the league, Rheydter SV and VfL Bochum, both promoted from the 2. Oberliga West. The league's top scorer was Hans Schäfer of 1. FC Köln with 26 goals.

Pos	Team	Pld	W	D	L	GF	GA	GD	Pts	Promotion, qualification or relegation
1	1. FC Köln	30	17	7	6	83	43	+40	41	Qualification to German championship
2	Rot-Weiss Essen	30	19	2	9	75	49	+26	40	
3	FC Schalke 04	30	16	7	7	76	51	+25	39	
4	Preußen Münster	30	11	11	8	60	54	+6	33	
5	Borussia Dortmund	30	14	4	12	69	58	+11	32	
6	Schwarz-Weiß Essen	30	13	5	12	72	53	+19	31	
7	Bayer Leverkusen	30	13	5	12	58	67	−9	31	
8	VfL Bochum	30	13	5	12	50	58	−8	31	
9	Alemannia Aachen	30	12	4	14	59	59	0	28	
10	Fortuna Düsseldorf	30	12	3	15	53	49	+4	27	
11	Meidericher SV	30	9	9	12	46	55	−9	27	
12	Borussia München-Gladbach	30	10	7	13	56	73	−17	27	
13	Preußen Dellbrück	30	10	7	13	41	55	−14	27	
14	SV Sodingen	30	11	4	15	46	56	−10	26	
15	Rheydter SV (R)	30	9	2	19	45	76	−31	20	Relegation to 2. Oberliga West
16	STV Horst-Emscher (R)	30	7	6	17	43	76	−33	20	Relegation to 2. Oberliga West

Source: RSSSF.com
Rules for classification: 1) Points;
(R) Relegated

== Oberliga Südwest ==
The 1953–54 season saw two new clubs in the league, ASV Landau and VfR Frankenthal, both promoted from the 2. Oberliga Südwest. The league's top scorer was Herbert Martin of 1. FC Saarbrücken with 35 goals, the highest total for any scorer in the five Oberligas in 1953–54.

Pos	Team	Pld	W	D	L	GF	GA	GD	Pts	Promotion, qualification or relegation
1	1. FC Kaiserslautern	30	26	0	4	139	33	+106	52	Qualification to German championship
2	FK Pirmasens	30	24	3	3	73	30	+43	51	
3	TuS Neuendorf	30	18	3	9	85	51	+34	39	
4	Saar 05 Saarbrücken	30	16	3	11	80	62	+18	35	
5	1. FC Saarbrücken	30	14	6	10	80	53	+27	34	
6	Phönix Ludwigshafen	30	14	6	10	49	55	−6	34	
7	FSV Mainz 05	30	13	5	12	61	50	+11	31	
8	Borussia Neunkirchen	30	12	4	14	58	54	+4	28	
9	VfR Frankenthal	30	9	9	12	38	45	−7	27	
10	Eintracht Trier	30	12	2	16	57	66	−9	26	
11	Wormatia Worms	30	10	6	14	53	68	−15	26	
12	TuRa Ludwigshafen	30	10	4	16	52	65	−13	24	
13	FV Speyer	30	10	2	18	35	80	−45	22	
14	VfR Kaiserslautern	30	9	3	18	41	69	−28	21	
15	ASV Landau (R)	30	6	5	19	27	93	−66	17	Relegation to 2. Oberliga Südwest
16	VfR Kirn (R)	30	4	5	21	34	83	−49	13	Relegation to 2. Oberliga Südwest

Source: RSSSF.com
Rules for classification: 1) Points;
(R) Relegated

== Oberliga Süd ==
The 1953–54 season saw two new clubs in the league, Jahn Regensburg and KSV Hessen Kassel, both promoted from the 2. Oberliga Süd. The league's top scorer was Helmut Preisendörfer (Kickers Offenbach) and Horst Schade (1. FC Nürnberg) with 22 goals each.

Pos	Team	Pld	W	D	L	GF	GA	GD	Pts	Promotion, qualification or relegation
1	VfB Stuttgart	30	18	7	5	64	39	+25	43	Qualification to German championship
2	Eintracht Frankfurt	30	17	8	5	70	31	+39	42	Qualification to German championship
3	Kickers Offenbach	30	16	9	5	70	38	+32	41	
4	1. FC Nürnberg	30	15	8	7	71	44	+27	38	
5	Karlsruher SC	30	14	7	9	61	53	+8	35	
6	Jahn Regensburg	30	14	5	11	42	48	−6	33	
7	FSV Frankfurt	30	11	8	11	60	56	+4	30	
8	FC Schweinfurt 05	30	12	4	14	53	50	+3	28	
9	FC Bayern Munich	30	9	10	11	42	46	−4	28	
10	VfR Mannheim	30	9	9	12	62	71	−9	27	
11	SpVgg Fürth	30	9	8	13	42	54	−12	26	
12	BC Augsburg	30	11	3	16	52	66	−14	25	
13	KSV Hessen Kassel	30	9	5	16	54	74	−20	23	
14	Stuttgarter Kickers	30	8	5	17	63	79	−16	21	
15	SV Waldhof Mannheim (R)	30	5	10	15	47	66	−19	20	Relegation to 2. Oberliga Süd
16	Viktoria Aschaffenburg (R)	30	8	4	18	44	82	−38	20	Relegation to 2. Oberliga Süd

Source: RSSSF.com
Rules for classification: 1) Points;
(R) Relegated

== German championship ==
The 1954 German football championship was contested by the six qualified Oberliga teams and won by Hannover 96, defeating 1. FC Kaiserslautern in the final. The six clubs played single round of matches at neutral grounds in two groups of three. The two group winners then advanced to the final.

=== Group 1 ===
Pos	Team	Pld	W	D	L	GF	GA	GD	Pts	Promotion, qualification or relegation
1	Hannover 96 (Q)	2	2	0	0	5	2	+3	4	Qualified to final
2	VfB Stuttgart	2	1	0	1	4	3	+1	2	
3	Berliner SV 92	2	0	0	2	1	5	−4	0	

Source: RSSSF.com
Rules for classification: 1) Points;
(Q) Qualified for the phase indicated

=== Group 2 ===
Pos	Team	Pld	W	D	L	GF	GA	GD	Pts	Promotion, qualification or relegation
1	1. FC Kaiserslautern (Q)	2	2	0	0	5	3	+2	4	Qualified to final
2	1. FC Köln	2	1	0	1	6	6	0	2	
3	Eintracht Frankfurt	2	0	0	2	2	4	−2	0	

Source: RSSSF.com
Rules for classification: 1) Points;
(Q) Qualified for the phase indicated

=== Final ===
Team 1	Score	Team 2
Hannover 96	5–1	1. FC Kaiserslautern
