= 1958–59 Eintracht Frankfurt season =

Eintracht Frankfurt
1958–59 season
- Chairman: Rudolf Gramlich
- Manager: Paul Oßwald
- Oberliga Süd: 1st / Champions
- DFB-Pokal / SFV-Pokal: Final (SFV-Pokal) (Note: The cup competition was continued in the 1959-60 season due to the club's participation in the championship round.)
- Top goalscorer: League: Eckehard Feigenspan (21); All: Eckehard Feigenspan (36)
- Highest home attendance: 50,000 on two occasions (league)
- Lowest home attendance: 4,000 13 December 1958 v VfR Mannheim (league)
- Average home league attendance: 17,333

The 1958–59 Eintracht Frankfurt season was the 59th season in the club's football history. In 1958–59 the club played in the Oberliga Süd, the top tier of German football. It was the club's 14th season in the Oberliga Süd.

The season ended up with Eintracht winning the German championship for the first time, beating their local rivals Kickers Offenbach in the final match.

== Matches ==
=== Legend ===
Win Draw Loss Postponed

=== Friendlies ===
27 July 1958	SpVgg Neu-Isenburg (West Germany)	1–4	(West Germany) Eintracht Frankfurt
	Krapf 81'	(Report)	Dieter Lindner 8'; Meier 11', 20'; Höfer 62' (pen.)	Attendance: 2,000; Referee: Schreiner

2 August 1958	Union Böckingen (West Germany)	3–3	(West Germany) Eintracht Frankfurt
	Dietz 4', 78'; Freudenberger 30'	(Report)	Bäumler 23'; Kress 28'; Lindner 57'	Attendance: 3,000; Referee: Huber

3 August 1958	SV Waldhof (West Germany)	2–3	(West Germany) Eintracht Frankfurt	Hornberg, Germany
	Straub; Lebefromm 75'	(Report)	Meier; Bäumler	Attendance: 3,000

6 August 1958	SC Preußen Frankfurt (West Germany)	3–7	(West Germany) Eintracht Frankfurt	Frankfurt, Germany
	Kraus 11', 88'; Wischnewski 79'	(Report)	Feigenspan 5', 37', 42'; Pfaff 18'; Bäumler 33'; Kress 67', 69'	Stadium: Sportplatz am Dachsberg; Attendance: 3,000; Referee: Heise

10 August 1958	Eintracht Frankfurt (West Germany)	9–0	(West Germany) TuS Bremerhaven 93	Frankfurt, Germany
	Feigenspan 5', 66'; Meier 36', 48', 81', 87'; Stinka 74', 78'; Pfaff 84'	(Report)		Stadium: Riederwaldstadion; Attendance: 1,500; Referee: Birr

27 September 1958	SV Wiesbaden (West Germany)	1–4	(West Germany) Eintracht Frankfurt
	Dingler 61'	(Report)	Meier 28'; Sztáni 35'; Weilbächer 53'; Dieter Lindner 74'	Attendance: 3,000; Referee: Lunkenbein

7 October 1958	Eintracht Frankfurt (West Germany)	7–2	(West Germany) Tennis Borussia Berlin	Frankfurt, Germany
19:30 CEST	Weilbächer 20', 78'; Bäumler 24', 73'; Feigenspan 36', 69'; Höfer 70' (pen.)	(Report)	Seeger 35'; Eder 50'	Stadium: Riederwaldstadion; Attendance: 2,500; Referee: Fürchtenicht

19 July 1958	Borussia Neunkirchen (West Germany)	0–1	(West Germany) Eintracht Frankfurt	Neunkirchen, West Germany
		(Report)	Sztáni 13'	Stadium: Ellenfeldstadion; Attendance: 10,000; Referee: Carle

4 January 1959	Eintracht Frankfurt (West Germany)	4–0	(Switzerland) FC La Chaux-de-Fonds
	Bäumler 3'; Pfaff 32', 72', 87'	(Report)		Attendance: 2,500; Referee: Gathof

27 March 1959	Viktoria 89 Berlin (West Germany)	1–1	(West Germany) Eintracht Frankfurt	Berlin, West Germany
	Schultz 57'	(Report)	Schymik 1'	Attendance: 12,000

30 March 1959	Tennis Borussia Berlin (West Germany)	0–6	(West Germany) Eintracht Frankfurt	Berlin, West Germany
		(Report)	Dieter Lindner; Pfaff; Sztáni; Kress; Weilbächer	Attendance: 8,000

=== Oberliga ===
==== League fixtures and results ====
17 August 1958 1	Kickers Offenbach	1–1	Eintracht Frankfurt	Offenbach, West Germany
13:00 CEST	Nuber 34' (pen.)	(Report)	Sztáni 13'	Stadium: Bieberer Berg; Attendance: 21,000; Referee: Kandelbinder

24 August 1958 2	Eintracht Frankfurt	0–1	SpVgg Fürth	Frankfurt, West Germany
15:00 CEST		(Report)	Bucklisch 15'	Stadium: Riederwaldstadion; Attendance: 10,000; Referee: Neumeyer

31 August 1958 3	VfB Stuttgart	0–4	Eintracht Frankfurt	Stuttgart, West Germany
		(Report)	Meier 12'; Feigenspan 35'; Kress 39', 50'	Attendance: 18,000; Referee: Fischer

7 September 1958 4	Eintracht Frankfurt	3–0	TSV 1860 München	Frankfurt, West Germany
	Höfer 12', 86' (pen.); Meier 24'	(Report)		Stadium: Riederwaldstadion; Attendance: 9,000; Referee: Stemmler

14 September 1958 5	Karlsruher SC	2–4	Eintracht Frankfurt	Karlsruhe, West Germany
15:00 CEST	Witlatschil 55'; Herrmann 83'	(Report)	Dieter Lindner 56'; Meier 62', 65'; Feigenspan 81'	Attendance: 10,000; Referee: Meißner

21 September 1958 6	Eintracht Frankfurt	4–1	FSV Frankfurt	Frankfurt, West Germany
15:00 CEST	Pfaff 32', 55'; Meier 44'; Weilbächer 78'	(Report)	Schmeißer 79'	Stadium: Riederwaldstadion; Attendance: 18,000; Referee: Treiber

5 October 1958 7	1. FC Nürnberg	4–3	Eintracht Frankfurt	Nuremberg, West Germany
	Zenger 20'; Müller 48'; Schmid 76'; Morlock 85'	(Report)	Feigenspan 17' 30'; Sztáni 61'	Stadium: Sportpark Zerzabelshof; Attendance: 20,000; Referee: Handwerker

12 October 1958 8	Eintracht Frankfurt	2–0	SSV Reutlingen 05	Frankfurt, West Germany
15:00 CEST	Fritschi 59' (o.g.); Sztáni 69'	(Report)		Stadium: Riederwaldstadion; Attendance: 7,000; Referee: Reil

19 October 1958 9	FC Bayern Munich	4–1	Eintracht Frankfurt	Munich, West Germany
	Siedl 15', 34', 51'; Jobst 55'	(Report)	Dieter Lindner 59'	Stadium: Grünwalder Stadion; Attendance: 25,000; Referee: Merz

1 November 1958 10	Eintracht Frankfurt	4–1	Viktoria Aschaffenburg	Frankfurt, West Germany
15:00 CEST	Meier 31', 59'; Feigenspan 65'; Schmitt 70' (o.g.)	(Report)	Buchwalder 10'	Stadium: Riederwaldstadion; Attendance: 9,000; Referee: Klein

9 November 1958 11	Eintracht Frankfurt	2–0	TSG Ulm 1846	Frankfurt, West Germany
14:30 CEST	Feigenspan 66', 69'			Stadium: Riederwaldstadion; Attendance: 7,000; Referee: Freimut

16 November 1958 12	SV Waldhof	1–4	Eintracht Frankfurt
	Cornelius 77'	(Report)	Pfaff 22'; Preis 64' (o.g.); Feigenspan 79'; Bäumler 88'	Attendance: 10,000; Referee: Dusch

30 November 1958 13	Eintracht Frankfurt	3–0	1. FC Schweinfurt 05	Frankfurt, West Germany
14:30 CEST	Feigenspan 1'; Kress 50', 85'	(Report)		Stadium: Riederwaldstadion; Attendance: 8,000; Referee: Ritter

7 December 1958 14	BC Augsburg	1–3	Eintracht Frankfurt	Augsburg, West Germany
	Biesinger 36' (pen.)	(Report)	Bäumler 71'; Sztáni 73'; Feigenspan 87'	Stadium: Rosenaustadion; Attendance: 6,000; Referee: Fierhauser

13 December 1958 15	Eintracht Frankfurt	3–1	VfR Mannheim	Frankfurt, West Germany
15:00 CEST	Feigenspan 65'; Weilbächer 69' (pen.); Bäumler 83'	(Report)	Langlotz 52'	Stadium: Riederwaldstadion; Attendance: 4,000; Referee: Scheuring

11 January 1959 16	Eintracht Frankfurt	2–2	Kickers Offenbach	Frankfurt, West Germany
14:30 CEST	Nazarenus 4' (o.g.); Pfaff 81'	(Report)	Nuber 15', 43'	Stadium: Waldstadion; Attendance: 50,000; Referee: Kandelbinder

18 January 1959 17	SpVgg Fürth	0–3	Eintracht Frankfurt	Fürth, West Germany
		(Report)	Dieter Lindner 15'; Kress 45'; Weilbächer 54'	Stadium: Sportpark Ronhof; Attendance: 5,000; Referee: Treiber

25 January 1959 18	Eintracht Frankfurt	2–2	VfB Stuttgart	Frankfurt, West Germany
	Feigenspan 5', 58'	(Report)	Weise 22'; Eigenbrodt 32' (o.g.)	Stadium: Riederwaldstadion; Attendance: 18,000; Referee: Fischer

1 February 1959 19	TSV 1860 München	1–1	Eintracht Frankfurt	Munich, West Germany
	Börstler 6'	(Report)	Dieter Lindner 87'	Stadium: Grünwalder Stadion; Attendance: 25,000; Referee: Handwerker

15 February 1959 20	Eintracht Frankfurt	2–0	Karlsruher SC	Frankfurt, West Germany
14:30 CEST	Feigenspan 28'; Sztáni 42'	(Report)		Stadium: Riederwaldstadion; Attendance: 10,000; Referee: Meißner

22 February 1959 21	FSV Frankfurt	1–2	Eintracht Frankfurt	Frankfurt, West Germany
14:30 CEST	Buchenau 70' (pen.)	(Report)	Pfaff 59'; Feigenspan 81'	Stadium: Sportplatz Bornheimer Hang; Attendance: 20,000; Referee: Sparring

1 March 1959 22	Eintracht Frankfurt	1–0	1. FC Nürnberg	Frankfurt, West Germany
15:00 CEST	Feigenspan 23'	(Report)		Stadium: Waldstadion; Attendance: 50,000; Referee: Karle

8 March 1959 23	SSV Reutlingen 05	0–4	Eintracht Frankfurt	Reutlingen, West Germany
		(Report)	Pfaff 23'; Sztáni 55'; Feigenspan 83', 90'	Stadium: Stadion an der Kreuzeiche; Attendance: 8,000; Referee: Ommerborn

14 March 1959 24	Eintracht Frankfurt	0–0	FC Bayern Munich	Frankfurt, West Germany
16:30 CEST		(Report)		Stadium: Waldstadion; Attendance: 40,000; Referee: Handwerker

22 March 1959 25	Viktoria Aschaffenburg	0–1	Eintracht Frankfurt	Aschaffenburg, West Germany
		(Report)	Feigenspan 62'	Stadium: Stadion am Schönbusch; Attendance: 14,000; Referee: Hubbuch

12 April 1959 26	TSG Ulm 1846	0–1	Eintracht Frankfurt	Ulm, West Germany
		(Report)	Dieter Lindner 81'	Stadium: Donaustadion; Attendance: 10,000; Referee: Jakobi

19 April 1959 27	Eintracht Frankfurt	2–1	SV Waldhof	Frankfurt, West Germany
15:00 CEST	Pfaff 23'; Feigenspan 55'	(Report)	Lebefromm 48'	Stadium: Riederwaldstadion; Attendance: 8,000; Referee: Scheuring

26 April 1959 28	1. FC Schweinfurt 05	0–2	Eintracht Frankfurt	Schweinfurt, West Germany
		(Report)	Sztáni 15'; Pfaff 55'	Stadium: Willy-Sachs-Stadion; Attendance: 7,000; Referee: Fierhauser

3 May 1959 29	Eintracht Frankfurt	4–0	BC Augsburg	Frankfurt, West Germany
	Pfaff 1'; Sztáni 35'; Schymik 74'; Kress 80'	(Report)		Stadium: Riederwaldstadion; Attendance: 12,000; Referee: Moers

10 May 1959 30	VfR Mannheim	1–3	Eintracht Frankfurt	Mannheim, West Germany
	Meyer 53'	(Report)	Feigenspan 20'; Sztáni 35', 81'	Stadium: Stadion an den Brauereien; Attendance: 12,000; Referee: Meißner

==== League table ====
Position	Team	Played	Goals	Points
1.	Eintracht Frankfurt	30	71-25	49-11
2.	Kickers Offenbach	30	73-31	47-13
3.	1. FC Nürnberg	30	80-38	43-17
4.	FC Bayern Munich	30	79-49	39-21
5.	VfB Stuttgart	30	61-49	30-30
6.	TSV 1860 München	30	61-57	30-30
7.	SpVgg Fürth	30	47:45	30:30
8.	VfR Mannheim	30	65-71	29-31
9.	Karlsruher SC (C)	30	73-69	28-32
10.	1. FC Schweinfurt 05	30	47-59	25-35
11.	FSV Frankfurt	30	49-69	24-36
12.	SSV Reutlingen 05	30	44-71	24-36
13.	TSG Ulm 1846 (P)	30	39-57	22-38
14.	Viktoria Aschaffenburg	30	43-69	22-38
15.	BC Augsburg	30	53-85	20-40
16.	SV Waldhof (P)	30	43-84	18-42

	Participation at the 1959 German football championship round
	Relegated to 1959–60 2. Oberliga Süd
(C)	1957–58 Oberliga Süd champions
(P)	Promoted from 1957–58 2. Oberliga

=== Championship round ===
==== Group stage ====
Pos	Team	Pld	W	D	L	GF	GA	GR	Pts	Qualification	SGE	KOE	FKP	SVW
1	Eintracht Frankfurt	6	6	0	0	26	11	2.364	12	Advance to final	—	2–1	3–2	4–2
2	1. FC Köln	6	2	1	3	10	14	0.714	5		2–4	—	3–2	2–2
3	FK Pirmasens	6	2	0	4	16	18	0.889	4		2–6	4–0	—	4–1
4	Werder Bremen	6	1	1	4	12	21	0.571	3		2–7	0–2	5–2	—

Source: RSSSF
Rules for classification: 1) Points; 2) Goal ratio.

16 May 1959 1	Werder Bremen	2–7	Eintracht Frankfurt	Bremen, West Germany
	Schütz 34', 65'	(Report)	Kress 10'; Feigenspan 14', 23', 89'; Pfaff 80'; Stinka 55'; Schymik 88'	Stadium: Weserstadion; Attendance: 42,000; Referee: Baumgärtel

23 May 1959 2	Eintracht Frankfurt	3–2	FK Pirmasens	Frankfurt, West Germany
18:00 CEST	Feigenspan 41'; Sztáni 56', 62'	(Report)	Kapitulski 37', 58'	Stadium: Waldstadion; Attendance: 81,000; Referee: Schulenburg

30 May 1959 3	Eintracht Frankfurt	2–1	1. FC Köln	Frankfurt, West Germany
18:00 CEST	Kress 13'; Feigenspan 33'	(Report)	Dörner 75' (pen.)	Stadium: Waldstadion; Attendance: 65,000; Referee: Treichel

7 June 1959 4	1. FC Köln	2–4	Eintracht Frankfurt	Cologne, West Germany
	Fendel 19'; Röhrig 72'	(Report)	Dieter Lindner 3'; Kress 27'; Feigenspan 64'; Meier 75'	Stadium: Müngersdorfer Stadion; Attendance: 35,000; Referee: Dusch

13 June 1959 5	FK Pirmasens	2–6	Eintracht Frankfurt	Ludwigshafen, West Germany
18:00 CEST	Kapitulski 59' (pen.); Lutz o.g.' (78)	(Report)	Kress 2', 80'; Feigenspan 4', 22' (pen.); Sztáni 19'; Dieter Lindner 72'	Stadium: Südweststadion; Attendance: 50,000; Referee: Malka

20 June 1959 6	Eintracht Frankfurt	4–2	Werder Bremen	Frankfurt, West Germany
18:00 CEST	Sztáni 23', 51'; Pfaff 43'; Feigenspan 89'	(Report)	Schütz 35'; Wilmovius 39'	Stadium: Waldstadion; Attendance: 28,000; Referee: Thier

==== Final ====
28 June 1959
15:00 CET

Eintracht Frankfurt	5–3 (a.e.t.)	Kickers Offenbach
Sztáni 1', 108'; Feigenspan 14', 92' (pen.), 119'	Report	Kraus 8'; Preisendörfer 23'; Gast 110'

Olympiastadion, Berlin
Attendance: 75,000
Referee: Erich Asmussen (Flensburg)

=== DFB-Pokal / SFV-Pokal ===
28 December 1958 1st Round	VfL Marburg	1–8	Eintracht Frankfurt
	Runkel 76'	(Report)	Feigenspan 4'; Dieter Lindner 25', 86', 89'; Pfaff 37', 55'; Weilbächer 51'; Bäumler 75'	Attendance: 5,000; Referee: Rosenkranz

7 February 1959 2nd Round	Hessen Kassel	2–3	Eintracht Frankfurt	Kassel, West Germany
	Müller 9', 63'	(Report)	Bäumler 4'; Weilbächer 18'; Sztáni 71'	Stadium: Auestadion; Attendance: 8,000; Referee: Webner

12 April 1959 3rd Round	Karlsruher SC	0–8	Eintracht Frankfurt	Karlsruhe, West Germany
		(Report)	Pfaff 8'; Feigenspan 16', 58'; Dieter Lindner 17', 73'; Sztáni 41', 42'; Kress 54'	Attendance: 10,000; Referee: Kandelbinder

== Squad ==
=== Squad and statistics ===
No.	Pos	Nat	Player	Total		Oberliga		Championship round		DFB-Pokal/SFV-Pokal	
No.	Pos	Nat	Player	Apps	Goals	Apps	Goals	Apps	Goals	Apps	Goals
	GK	(West Germany) FRG	Helmut Abraham	1	0	0	0	0	0	1	0
	GK	(West Germany) FRG	Helmut Henig	8	0	8	0	0	0	0	0
	GK	(West Germany) FRG	Egon Loy	31	0	22	0	7	0	2	0
	DF	(West Germany) FRG	Adolf Bechtold	8	0	6	0	0	0	2	0
	DF	(West Germany) FRG	Hermann Höfer	39	2	30	2	7	0	2	0
	DF	(West Germany) FRG	Friedel Lutz	28	0	25	0	3	0	0	0
	MF	(West Germany) FRG	Hans-Walter Eigenbrodt	12	0	5	0	5	0	2	0
	MF	(Socialist Federal Republic of Yugoslavia) YUG	Ivica Horvat	31	0	26	0	3	0	2	0
	MF	(West Germany) FRG	Eberhard Schymik	29	2	24	1	2	1	3	0
	MF	(West Germany) FRG	Dieter Stinka	17	1	10	0	6	1	1	0
	MF	(West Germany) FRG	Hans Weilbächer	35	5	28	3	5	0	2	2
	FW	(West Germany) FRG	Erich Bäumler	12	5	9	3	1	0	2	2
	FW	(West Germany) FRG	Eckehard Feigenspan	36	36	27	21	7	12	2	3
	FW	(West Germany) FRG	Richard Kress	32	12	23	6	7	5	2	1
	FW	(West Germany) FRG	Dieter Lindner	25	10	22	5	3	5	0	0
	FW	(West Germany) FRG	Erich Meier	15	8	13	7	2	1	0	0
	FW	(West Germany) FRG	Alfred Pfaff	33	14	27	9	4	2	2	3
	FW	(Hungary) HUN	István Sztáni	27	13	25	10	2	3	0	0

=== Transfers ===
In:

No.	Pos.	Nation	Player
—	GK	(West Germany) FRG	Helmut Abraham (from SG Dietzenbach)
—	GK	(West Germany) FRG	Helmut Henig (from Eintracht Frankfurt II)
—	MF	(West Germany) FRG	Dieter Stinka (from 1. FC Gelnhausen)

Out:

No.	Pos.	Nation	Player
—	FW	(West Germany) FRG	Helmut Geiger (to FSV Frankfurt)
—	MF	(Hungary) HUN	János Hanek (to Stuttgarter Kickers)
—	DF	(West Germany) FRG	Hermann Hesse (to VfR Groß-Gerau)
—	GK	(West Germany) FRG	Karlheinz Lindner (to VfB Friedberg)
—	FW	(Hungary) HUN	Tibor Lőrincz (to Altona 93)
—	FW	(West Germany) FRG	Hermann-Josef Wehner (to Phönix Ludwigshafen)

== See also ==
- 1959 German football championship

== Sources ==
- Matheja, Ulrich (2011). Unsere Eintracht - Eintracht Frankfurt - Die Chronik. Die Werkstatt. ISBN 978-3-89533-750-5.
