= 1960–61 Eintracht Frankfurt season =

Eintracht Frankfurt
1960–61 season
- Chairman: Rudolf Gramlich
- Manager: Paul Oßwald
- Oberliga Süd: 2nd / Runners-Up
- German Championship Qualifiers: 2nd / Runners-Up
- SFV-Pokal: Final (59–60)
- SFV-Pokal: Quarterfinals (60–61; qualification for DFB-Pokal)
- Top goalscorer: League: Erwin Stein (23); All: Erwin Stein (30)
- Highest home attendance: 25,000 2 October 1927 v FSV Frankfurt (league)
- Lowest home attendance: 2,000 11 December 1927 v VfR Offenbach (league)

The 1960–61 Eintracht Frankfurt season was the 61st season in the club's football history. In Oberliga Süd the club played in the Oberliga Süd, then one of many top tiers of German football. It was the club's 16th season in the Oberliga Süd. In the German Championship Qualifiers finished as 3rd.

== Matches ==
=== Legend ===
Win Draw Loss Postponed

=== Friendlies ===
23 July 1960	SV Darmstadt 98 (Germany)	1–1	(Germany) Eintracht Frankfurt	Ober-Ramstadt, West Germany
	Ley 79' (pen.)	Report	Solz 51'	Attendance: 3,500; Referee: Eisemann

30 July 1960	Schalke 04 (Germany)	0–3	(Germany) Eintracht Frankfurt	Gelsenkirchen, West Germany
		Report	Stein 16', 20'; Schämer 22'	Stadium: Glückauf-Kampfbahn; Attendance: 20,000; Referee: Wortmann

3 August 1960	Eintracht Frankfurt (Germany)	5–6	(United States) DAFB (German-American soccer association) XI	Berlin, West Germany
	Stein 4'; Kreuz 7'; Kress 22'; Schämer 24' (pen.), 28'	Report	Vollmer 17' (pen.); Hate 59', 73'; Fister 76', 77'; Loske 90'	Attendance: 5,000; Referee: Tschenscher

6 August 1960	Mainz 05 (Germany)	1–2	(Germany) Eintracht Frankfurt	Germany
	Rother 34'	Report	Schämer 41'; Stein 75'	Attendance: 6,000; Referee: Spinnler

10 August 1960	FV Horas (Germany)	0–12	(Germany) Eintracht Frankfurt	Fulda, West Germany
		Report	Kraft 20', 28', 63', 82'; Kreuz 31', 40', 79', 85', 87'; Solz 61', 70'; Kress 81'	Stadium: Sportplatz am Aschenberg; Attendance: 3,000

27 August 1960 Trofeo Ramón de Carranza semi-final	Athletic Club (Spain)	2–1	(Germany) Eintracht Frankfurt	Cádiz, Spain
	Merodio 23'; Arieta 40'	Report	Pfaff 33'	Stadium: Estadio Ramón de Carranza; Attendance: 32,000; Referee: Contreras

28 August 1960 Trofeo Ramón de Carranza 3rd place play-off	Stade de Reims (France)	4–1	(Germany) Eintracht Frankfurt	Cádiz, Spain
	Vincent 27', 66'; Rustichelli 57'; Piantoni 88'	Report	Pfaff 34'	Stadium: Estadio Ramón de Carranza

16 November 1960	Tasmania Berlin (Germany)	1–1	(Germany) Eintracht Frankfurt	Berlin, West Germany
	Schlichting 58'	Report	Solz 35'	Attendance: 4,500; Referee: Schubeck

22 November 1960	Eintracht Frankfurt (Germany)	3–1	(Soviet Union) Dynamo Kyiv	Frankfurt, West Germany
20:00 CET	Schämer 41'; Weilbächer 62'; Solz 82'	Report	Kanevskyi 59'	Stadium: Riederwaldstadion; Attendance: 10,000; Referee: Sparing

29 March 1961	Eintracht Frankfurt (Germany)	6–2	(Germany) Schalke 04	Frankfurt, West Germany
20:00 CET	Lindner 1', 60'; Stein 43', 54'; Lutz 67' (pen.); Meier 84'	Report	Klodt 17'; Soya 90'	Stadium: Riederwaldstadion; Attendance: 12,000; Referee: Handwerker

10 May 1961	Grasshopper Club Zürich (Switzerland)	2–1	(Germany) Eintracht Frankfurt	Zürich, Switzerland
	Burger 78', 80'	Report	Kreuz 40'	Attendance: 10,000; Referee: Schicker

=== Oberliga Süd ===
==== League fixtures and results ====
14 August 1960 1	Eintracht Frankfurt	2–0	1860 Munich	Frankfurt, West Germany
	Kress 8'; Schämer 58'	Report		Stadium: Riederwaldstadion; Attendance: 10,000; Referee: Moers

21 August 1960 2	Kickers Offenbach	2–1	Eintracht Frankfurt	Frankfurt, West Germany
15:00 CET	Praxl 45', 50'	Report	Stein 22'	Stadium: Waldstadion; Attendance: 35,000; Referee: Eisemann

4 September 1960 4	Karlsruher SC	5–2	Eintracht Frankfurt	Karlsruhe, West Germany
	Nedoschil 40', 50', 87'; Herrmann; Reitgaßl 67'	Report	Schämer 70'; Kress 85'	Stadium: Wildparkstadion; Attendance: 15,000; Referee: Fischer

11 September 1960 5	Jahn Regensburg	1–4	Eintracht Frankfurt	Regensburg, West Germany
	Schmidt 85'	Report	Kress 8'; Stein 69'; Schämer 78'; Schymik 84'	Attendance: 16,000; Referee: Ommerborn

18 September 1960 6	Eintracht Frankfurt	1–1	FSV Frankfurt	Frankfurt, West Germany
15:00 CET	Lutz 48' (pen.)	Report	Schlagowski 84'	Stadium: Riederwaldstadion; Attendance: 18,000; Referee: Eckel

24 September 1960 7	SpVgg Fürth	1–3	Eintracht Frankfurt	Fürth, West Germany
	Schmidt 24'	Report	Stein 10', 50'; Groß 60' (o.g.)	Stadium: Sportpark Ronhof; Attendance: 10,000; Referee: Treiber

1 October 1960 8	Eintracht Frankfurt	6–1	SSV Reutlingen	Frankfurt, West Germany
15:30 CET	Stein 42', 46', 82'; Kress 68'; Lindner 86'; Weilbächer 89'	Report	Scheurer 40'	Stadium: Riederwaldstadion; Attendance: 7,000; Referee: Meißner

9 October 1960 9	Bayern Munich	4–2	Eintracht Frankfurt	Munich, West Germany
	Sieber 20', 43'; Grosser 80', 84'	Report	Schymik 10'; Stein 54'	Attendance: 25,000; Referee: Jakobi

15 October 1960 10	Eintracht Frankfurt	2–0	Schweinfurt 05	Frankfurt, West Germany
15:30 CET	Schymik 82'; Krämer 87' (o.g.)	Report		Stadium: Riederwaldstadion; Attendance: 6,000; Referee: Deuschel

30 October 1960 11	VfB Stuttgart	1–2	Eintracht Frankfurt	Stuttgart, West Germany
	Geiger 35'	Report	Schymik 53'; Stinka 88'	Attendance: 17,000; Referee: Handwerker

5 November 1960 12	Eintracht Frankfurt	3–2	SV Waldhof	Frankfurt, West Germany
14:30 CET	Lindner 51', 82'; Kress 65'	Report	Gutperle 24'; Kraft 25'	Stadium: Riederwaldstadion; Attendance: 8,000; Referee: Scheuring

13 November 1960 13	Ulm 1846	0–0	Eintracht Frankfurt	Ulm, West Germany
		Report		Attendance: 10,000; Referee: Kandelbinder

27 November 1960 14	Eintracht Frankfurt	0–1	Bayern Hof	Frankfurt, West Germany
14:30 CET		Report	Horn 14'	Stadium: Riederwaldstadion; Attendance: 5,000; Referee: Glatthaar

4 December 1960 15	VfR Mannheim	1–4	Eintracht Frankfurt	Mannheim, West Germany
	Bast 85'	Report	Stein 63'; Kreuz 75', 76' (pen.); Schämer 86'	Attendance: 8,000; Referee: Ott

11 December 1960 16	1860 Munich	3–0	Eintracht Frankfurt	Munich, West Germany
	Fallisch 14'; Feigenspan 54'; Brunnenmeier 89'	Report		Stadium: Grünwalder Stadion; Attendance: 18,000; Referee: Kreitlein

18 December 1960 17	Eintracht Frankfurt	2–0	Kickers Offenbach	Frankfurt, West Germany
14:00 CET	Lindner 14'; Solz 89'	Report		Stadium: Riederwaldstadion; Attendance: 18,000; Referee: Handwerker

26 December 1960 3	Eintracht Frankfurt	0–2	1. FC Nürnberg	Frankfurt, West Germany
		Report	Morlock 24'; Flachenecker 57'	Stadium: Waldstadion; Attendance: 35,000; Referee: Tschenscher

8 January 1961 18	1. FC Nürnberg	2–0	Eintracht Frankfurt	Nuremberg, West Germany
	Strehl 21'; Albrecht 47'	Report		Stadium: Zabo; Attendance: 30,000; Referee: Jakobi

15 January 1961 19	Eintracht Frankfurt	4–2	Karlsruher SC	Frankfurt, West Germany
14:15 CET	Solz 15'; Kress 34'; Stinka 56'; Stein 79'	Report	Nedoschil 13'; Späth 24'	Stadium: Riederwaldstadion; Attendance: 10,000; Referee: Kandelbinder

21 January 1961 20	Eintracht Frankfurt	11–0	Jahn Regensburg	Frankfurt, West Germany
14:30 CET	Stinka 9', 21', 54' (pen.); Stein 24', 44', 88'; Kress 48', 85'; Schämer 68'; Weilbächer 73'; Solz 76'	Report		Stadium: Riederwaldstadion; Attendance: 6,000; Referee: Schmitt

5 February 1961 22	Eintracht Frankfurt	2–2	SpVgg Fürth	Frankfurt, West Germany
	Kress 59', 61'	Report	Appis 3'; Schneider 40'	Stadium: Riederwaldstadion; Attendance: 4,000; Referee: Fritz

19 February 1961 23	SSV Reutlingen	0–3	Eintracht Frankfurt	Reutlingen, West Germany
		Report	Stinka 40' (pen.); Schämer 58'; Stein 79'	Attendance: 14,000; Referee: Deuschel

26 February 1961 24	Eintracht Frankfurt	6–0	Bayern Munich	Frankfurt, West Germany
	Lindner 5'; Stein 14', 54'; Kress 70', 84'; Schämer 86'	Report		Stadium: Riederwaldstadion; Attendance: 14,000; Referee: Dusch

5 March 1961 21	FSV Frankfurt	2–4	Eintracht Frankfurt	Frankfurt, West Germany
15:00 CET	Hofmann 24'; Geiger 46'	Report	Stein 6'; Stinka 13' (pen.); Schämer 24'; Lutz 56' (pen.)	Stadium: Stadion am Bornheimer Hang; Attendance: 30,000; Referee: Handwerker

12 March 1961 25	Schweinfurt 05	1–3	Eintracht Frankfurt	Schweinfurt, West Germany
	Lindner 24'	Report	Solz 17'; Stinka 43'; Stein 49'	Stadium: Willy-Sachs-Stadion; Attendance: 8,000; Referee: Siebert

18 March 1961 26	Eintracht Frankfurt	4–1	VfB Stuttgart	Frankfurt, West Germany
16:30 CET	Stein 23'; Stinka 28'; Weilbächer 38'; Solz 77'	Report	Geiger 84'	Stadium: Riederwaldstadion; Attendance: 15,000; Referee: Hubbuch

9 April 1961 27	SV Waldhof	0–0	Eintracht Frankfurt	Mannheim, West Germany
		Report		Attendance: 15,000; Referee: Kandelbinder

16 April 1961 28	Eintracht Frankfurt	3–0	Ulm 1846	Frankfurt, West Germany
15:00 CET	Meier 34'; Stein 44'; Lindner 58'	Report		Stadium: Riederwaldstadion; Attendance: 12,000; Referee: Beetz

22 April 1961 29	Bayern Hof	1–1	Eintracht Frankfurt	Hof, West Germany
	Friedrich 81'	Report	Stein 71'	Attendance: 12,000; Referee: Kreitlein

29 April 1961 30	Eintracht Frankfurt	3–2	VfR Mannheim	Frankfurt, West Germany
17:00 CET	Lindner 6'; Stein 43', 55'	Report	Arnold 53'; Schmidt 74'	Stadium: Riederwaldstadion; Attendance: 6,000; Referee: Sailer

==== League table ====
Pos	Team	Pld	W	D	L	GF	GA	GD	Pts	Promotion, qualification or relegation
1	1. FC Nürnberg	30	23	2	5	96	30	+66	48	Qualification to Qualifier to the championship
2	Eintracht Frankfurt	30	18	5	7	78	38	+40	41	Qualification to Qualifier to the championship
3	Karlsruher SC	30	17	4	9	75	51	+24	38	
4	Kickers Offenbach	30	16	4	10	57	46	+11	36	
5	SSV Reutlingen	30	15	2	13	65	55	+10	32	
6	1860 Munich	30	14	4	12	61	66	−5	32	
7	VfB Stuttgart	30	14	2	14	57	53	+4	30	
8	Bayern Munich	30	12	6	12	57	54	+3	30	
9	VfR Mannheim	30	13	3	14	53	51	+2	29	
10	Bayern Hof	30	9	9	12	41	60	−19	27	
11	SpVgg Fürth	30	11	4	15	40	47	−7	26	
12	FSV Frankfurt	30	9	8	13	45	59	−14	26	
13	SV Waldhof	30	10	5	15	47	56	−9	25	
14	Schweinfurt 05	30	9	7	14	42	54	−12	25	
15	Ulm 1846	30	9	6	15	48	62	−14	24	Relegation to the second tier
16	Jahn Regensburg	30	3	5	22	27	107	−80	11	Relegation to the second tier

Source: RSSSF.com
Rules for classification: 1) Points;

==== Results summary ====
Overall								Home						Away					
Pld	W	D	L	GF	GA	GD	Pts	W	D	L	GF	GA	GD	W	D	L	GF	GA	GD
30	18	5	7	78	38	+40	59	11	2	2	49	14	+35	7	3	5	29	24	+5

Source: Bundesliga

==== Results by round ====
Round	1	2	3	4	5	6	7	8	9	10	11	12	13	14	15	16	17	18	19	20	21	22	23	24	25	26	27	28	29	30
Ground	H	A	H	A	A	H	A	H	A	H	A	H	A	H	A	A	H	A	H	H	A	H	A	H	A	H	A	H	A	H
Result	W	L	L	L	W	D	W	W	L	W	W	W	D	L	W	L	W	L	W	W	W	D	W	W	W	W	D	W	D	W
Position	1	7	13	8	8	7	5	7	5	4	3	4	4	4	4	4	4	4	4	3	4	4	3	3	2	2	2	2	2	2

Updated to match(es) played on December 2020. Source: https://www.eintracht-archiv.de/1960.html
A = Away; H = Home; W = Win; D = Draw; L = Loss

=== German Championship Pre-qualifiers ===
6 May 1961 1	Eintracht Frankfurt	5–0	Borussia Neunkirchen	Ludwigshafen, West Germany
17:30 CET	Kreuz 38', 42'; Stein 48'; Lindner 78'; Kress 78'	Report		Stadium: Südweststadion; Attendance: 35,000; Referee: Ternieden

=== German Championship Qualifiers ===
==== League fixtures and results ====
20 May 1961 1	Eintracht Frankfurt	1–1	1. FC Saarbrücken	Frankfurt, West Germany
17:30 CET	Diehl 37' (o.g.)	Report	Vollmar 59'	Stadium: Waldstadion; Attendance: 48,000; Referee: Zimmermann

27 May 1961 2	Borussia Dortmund	0–1	Eintracht Frankfurt	Dortmund, West Germany
17:30 CET		Report	Meier 15'	Stadium: Stadion Rote Erde; Attendance: 43,000; Referee: Sturm

3 June 1961 3	Hamburger SV	2–1	Eintracht Frankfurt	Hamburg, West Germany
	Stürmer 62'; Seeler 72'	Report	Meier 5'	Stadium: Volksparkstadion; Attendance: 71,000; Referee: Malka

10 June 1961 4	Eintracht Frankfurt	4–2	Hamburger SV	Frankfurt, West Germany
17:30 CET	Stein 24'; Meier 63', 75'; Solz 73'	Report	Stürmer 38'; Seeler 43'	Stadium: Waldstadion; Attendance: 70,000; Referee: Thier

14 June 1961 5	Eintracht Frankfurt	1–2	Borussia Dortmund	Frankfurt, West Germany
18:30 CET	Stein 19'	Report	Schmidt 32'; Peters 73'	Stadium: Waldstadion; Attendance: 68,000; Referee: Dusch

18 June 1961 6	1. FC Saarbrücken	2–5	Eintracht Frankfurt	Saarbrücken, West Germany
15:00 CET	Thiel 56'; Vollmar 69'	Report	Kreuz 7'; Stein 47'; Meier 60'; Lutz 85'; Lindner 87'	Stadium: Ludwigsparkstadion; Attendance: 32,000; Referee: Seekamp

==== League table ====
Pos	Team	Pld	W	D	L	GF	GA	GD	Pts	Promotion, qualification or relegation
1	Borussia Dortmund	6	3	1	2	19	12	+7	7	Qualification to Qualifier to the championship
2	Eintracht Frankfurt	6	3	1	2	13	9	+4	7	
3	Hamburger SV	6	3	0	3	14	19	−5	6	
4	1. FC Saarbrücken	6	1	2	3	11	17	−6	4	

Source: RSSSF.com
Rules for classification: 1) Points;

==== Results summary ====
Overall								Home						Away					
Pld	W	D	L	GF	GA	GD	Pts	W	D	L	GF	GA	GD	W	D	L	GF	GA	GD
6	3	1	2	13	9	+4	7	1	1	1	6	5	+1	2	0	1	7	4	+3

Source: Bundesliga

==== Results by round ====
Round	1	2	3	4	5	6
Ground	H	A	A	H	H	A
Result	D	W	L	W	L	W
Position	2	1	3	1	3	1

Updated to match(es) played on 31 December 2020. Source:
A = Away; H = Home; W = Win; D = Draw; L = Loss

=== DFB-Pokal / SFV-Pokal ===
==== 1959–60 ====
(Note: The 1959–60 cup competition was continued in the 1960-61 season.)

30 July 1960 Final	Karlsruher SC	2–1	Eintracht Frankfurt	Mannheim, West Germany
	Wischnowsky 30'; Heinz Ruppenstein	Report	Weilbächer 80'	Attendance: 22,000; Referee: Fischer

==== 1960–61 ====
23 October 1960 1st Round	VfB Friedberg	0–6	Eintracht Frankfurt	West Germany
		Report	Stein 13', 35', 86'; Solz 18'; Kreuz 43'; Kraft 44'	Attendance: 3,000; Referee: Schreiner

19 November 1960 2nd Round	Hünfelder SV	0–6	Eintracht Frankfurt	Hünfeld, West Germany
		Report	Schämer 31', 42'; Lindner 52'; Kreuz 61'; Weilbächer 78', 86'	Attendance: 4,000; Referee: Clasen

11 February 1961 Round of 16	Hessen Kassel	0–1 (a.e.t.)	Eintracht Frankfurt	Kassel, West Germany
		Report	Kress 102'	Stadium: Auestadion; Attendance: 12,000; Referee: Kreitlein

25 March 1961 Quarter-finals	Eintracht Frankfurt	4–0	1. FC Pforzheim	Frankfurt, West Germany
	Weilbächer 4'; Lindner 46'; Stinka 60'; Schymik 78'	Report		Stadium: Riederwaldstadion; Attendance: 5,000; Referee: Reil
Note: The tournament didn't continue after the quarter-finals since it already counted as qualification for the DFB-Pokal

== Squad ==
=== Squad and statistics ===
No.	Pos	Nat	Player	Total		Oberliga		South German Cup		German Championship round	
No.	Pos	Nat	Player	Apps	Goals	Apps	Goals	Apps	Goals	Apps	Goals
	GK	(Germany) GER	Egon Loy	42	0	30	0	5	0	7	0
	DF	(Germany) GER	Willi Herbert	1	0	1	0	0	0	0	0
	DF	(Germany) GER	Hermann Höfer	42	0	30	0	5	0	7	0
	DF	(Germany) GER	Fritz Kübert	3	0	0	0	3	0	0	0
	DF	(Germany) GER	Friedel Lutz	37	3	28	2	2	0	7	1
	DF	(Germany) GER	Dieter Stinka	30	10	19	9	4	1	7	0
	MF	(Germany) GER	Hans-Walter Eigenbrodt	23	0	16	0	4	0	3	0
	MF	(Germany) GER	Eberhard Schymik	38	5	30	4	4	1	4	0
	MF	(Germany) GER	Hans Weilbächer	42	7	30	3	5	4	7	0
	FW	(Germany) GER	Dieter Kraft	4	1	3	0	1	1	0	0
	FW	(Germany) GER	Richard Kress	36	14	28	12	2	1	6	1
	FW	(Germany) GER	Ernst Kreuz	22	7	14	2	3	2	5	3
	FW	(Germany) GER	Dieter Lindner	30	11	20	7	4	2	6	2
	FW	(Germany) GER	Erich Meier	7	6	2	1	0	0	5	5
	FW	(Germany) GER	Alfred Pfaff	4	0	4	0	0	0	0	0
	FW	(Germany) GER	Lothar Schämer	30	10	24	8	4	2	2	0
	FW	(Germany) GER	Wolfgang Solz	31	7	23	5	4	1	4	1
	FW	(Germany) GER	Erwin Stein	40	30	28	23	5	3	7	4

=== Transfers ===
In:

No.	Pos.	Nation	Player
—	FW	GER	Dieter Kraft (from SV Offenthal)
—	FW	GER	Ernst Kreuz (from Viktoria Aschaffenburg)
—	FW	GER	Lothar Schämer (from SV Erzhausen)

Out:

No.	Pos.	Nation	Player
—	FW	GER	Erich Bäumler (to Mainz 05)
—	MF	GER	Adolf Bechtold (to Eintracht Frankfurt II)
—	MF	GER	Severin Sorger (to SV Niederlahnstein)

== See also ==
- 1961 German football championship

== Sources ==
- German archive site (in German)
- Matheja, Ulrich (2011). Unsere Eintracht - Eintracht Frankfurt - Die Chronik. Die Werkstatt. ISBN 978-3-89533-750-5.
