= 1959–60 Eintracht Frankfurt season =

Eintracht Frankfurt
1959–60 season
- Chairman: Rudolf Gramlich
- Manager: Paul Oßwald
- Oberliga Süd: 3rd
- DFB-Pokal / SFV-Pokal: Final (58–59) (Note: The 1958–59 cup competition was continued in the 1959-60 season due to the club's participation in the 1959 championship round.)
- DFB-Pokal / SFV-Pokal: Semi-final (Note: The 1959–60 cup competition was continued in the 1960-61 season due to the club's participation in the 1960 European Cup final.)
- European Cup: Runners-up
- Top goalscorer: League: Stein (24); All: Stein (43)
- Highest home attendance: 38,000 27 December 1959 v Karlsruher SC (league)
- Lowest home attendance: 3,500 5 December 1959 v SSV Reutlingen 05 (league)
- Average home league attendance: 14,467
Home colours

The 1959–60 Eintracht Frankfurt season was the 60th season in the club's football history. In 1959–60 the club played in the Oberliga Süd, the top tier of German football. It was the club's 15th season in the Oberliga Süd.

== Matches ==
=== Legend ===
Win Draw Loss Postponed

=== Friendlies ===
4 August 1959	Moldova Kishinev (Soviet Union)	5–1	(West Germany) Eintracht Frankfurt	Kishinev, Soviet Union
	Goal	(Report)	Weilbächer

6 August 1959	Arsenal Kyiv (Soviet Union)	0–1	(West Germany) Eintracht Frankfurt	Kyiv, Soviet Union
		(Report)	Kress

9 August 1959	Admiral Leningrad (Soviet Union)	2–3	(West Germany) Eintracht Frankfurt	Leningrad, Soviet Union
	Kislov; Chapovizki	(Report)	Stein 32'; Pfaff	Attendance: 30,000

6 August 1959	Helsinki XI (Finland)	0–2	(West Germany) Eintracht Frankfurt	Helsinki, Finland
		(Report)	Stinka; Stein 70'	Stadium: Olympic Stadium

19 August 1959	Eintracht Frankfurt (West Germany)	1–0	(West Germany) Fortuna Düsseldorf	Korbach, West Germany
	Pfaff 71'	(Report)		Attendance: 8,000; Referee: Böttcher

8 September 1959	Eintracht Frankfurt (West Germany)	5–1	(Belgium) Standard Liège	Frankfurt, Germany
20:00 CEST	Meier 16'; Bäumler or Weilbächer 27'; Pfaff 39'; Lindner 69'; Solz 88'	(Report)	Piters 76'	Stadium: Riederwaldstadion; Attendance: 19,000; Referee: Dietrich

3 October 1959	Servette FC (Switzerland)	2–3	(West Germany) Eintracht Frankfurt	Geneva, Switzerland
	Fatton 38'; Makay 44'	(Report)	Kress 37'; Stein 39'; Bäumler 72'	Stadium: Stade des Charmilles; Attendance: 6,000; Referee: Domeniconi

7 October 1959	TuS Neuendorf (West Germany)	4–4	(West Germany) Eintracht Frankfurt	Koblenz, West Germany
	Klein 27'; Weiand 39', 89'; Stupp 82'	(Report)	Stein 28'; Solz 29'; Lindner 32', 75'	Stadium: Stadion Oberwerth; Attendance: 4,000; Referee: Dietz

11 May 1960	Eintracht Frankfurt (West Germany)	4–0	(France) RC Strasbourg	Frankfurt, West Germany
20:00 CEST	Stinka 34'; Meier 45'; Kress 53'; Lindner 80'	(Report)		Stadium: Waldstadion; Attendance: 12,000; Referee: Eisemann

28 May 1960	FC St. Pauli (West Germany)	3–2	(West Germany) Eintracht Frankfurt	Hamburg, West Germany
	Krüger 20'; Haecks 75'; Krafczyk 89'	(Report)	Kress 60'; Lindner 65'	Stadium: Volksparkstadion; Attendance: 25,000; Referee: Sturm

4 June 1960	ARA La Gantoise (Belgium)	2–2	(West Germany) Eintracht Frankfurt
	Willems 38'; Goyvaerts 62'	(Report)	Kress 20'; Pfaff 35'	Attendance: 22,000; Referee: Willems

14 June 1960	Eintracht Frankfurt (West Germany)	2–4	(Brazil) Santos FC	Frankfurt, West Germany
20:00 CEST	Stein 22', 24'	(Report)	Zito 35', 71'; Pelé 63'; Mengálvio 79'	Stadium: Waldstadion; Attendance: 45,000; Referee: Handwerker

18 June 1960	Sportfreunde Herdorf (West Germany)	2–6	(West Germany) Eintracht Frankfurt	Herdorf, West Germany
	Krämer 5'; Grünebach 25'	(Report)	Meier 6'; Schämer 20', 62'; Stein 37', 72'; Pfaff 80'	Attendance: 7,000

19 June 1960	Hamborn 07 (West Germany)	3–5	(West Germany) Eintracht Frankfurt
	Carel 71'; Rinas 73'; Poll 80'	(Report)	Schämer 7'; Stein 12', 18', 27'; Pfaff 23'	Attendance: 15,000; Referee: Plänker

=== Oberliga ===
==== League fixtures and results ====
22 August 1959 1	Eintracht Frankfurt	5–3	SpVgg Fürth	Frankfurt, Germany
17:30 CEST	Bäumler 34'; Lindner 36'; Stein 40', 65'; Kress 46'	(Report)	Stumptner 22'; Landleiter 24'; Appis 51'	Stadium: Riederwaldstadion; Attendance: 18,000; Referee: Fritz

30 August 1959 2	VfB Stuttgart	2–3	Eintracht Frankfurt	Stuttgart, West Germany
	Geiger 14'; Praxl 52'	(Report)	Stein 13', 16'; Pfaff 66'	Stadium: Neckarstadion; Attendance: 40,000; Referee: Meißner

13 September 1959 3	TSV 1860 München	4–2	Eintracht Frankfurt	Munich, West Germany
	Feigenspan 21', 48'; Kölbl 44'; Fallisch 49'	(Report)	Bäumler 61', 83'	Stadium: Grünwalder Stadion; Attendance: 26,000; Referee: Fierhauser

19 September 1959 4	Eintracht Frankfurt	11–0	Bayern Hof	Frankfurt, Germany
17:30 CEST	Bäumler 31', 54', 56'; Stein 40', 44'; Lindner 41', 71', 86'; Kress 63'; Pfaff 69', 81'	(Report)		Stadium: Riederwaldstadion; Attendance: 12,000; Referee: Klein

27 September 1959 5	FSV Frankfurt	2–4	Eintracht Frankfurt	Frankfurt, West Germany
15:00 CEST	Hofmann 15', 87'	(Report)	Stein 19', 49', 54', 74'	Stadium: Stadion am Bornheimer Hang; Attendance: 25,000; Referee: Rodenhausen

11 October 1959 6	Eintracht Frankfurt	6–2	Stuttgarter Kickers	Frankfurt, Germany
15:00 CEST	Stein 26', 39', 76'; Lindner 37', 85'; Kress 68'	(Report)	Lettl 21'; Hanek 46'	Stadium: Riederwaldstadion; Attendance: 8,000; Referee: Ott

18 October 1959 7	1. FC Nürnberg	3–3	Eintracht Frankfurt	Nuremberg, West Germany
	Strehl 34'; Schweinberger 48'; Dirrigl 51'	(Report)	Pfaff 9', 53'; Lindner 62'	Stadium: Sportpark Zerzabelshof; Attendance: 47,000; Referee: Jakobi

25 October 1959 8	Eintracht Frankfurt	0–2	FC Bayern Munich	Frankfurt, West Germany
15:00 CEST		(Report)	Kuhnert 7'; Lutz 72' (o.g.)	Stadium: Waldstadion; Attendance: 20,000; Referee: Kreitlein

1 November 1959 9	Kickers Offenbach	2–1	Eintracht Frankfurt	Offenbach, West Germany
14:30 CEST	Kraus 74' (pen.); Nuber 78'	(Report)	Bäumler 60'	Stadium: Bieberer Berg; Attendance: 18,000; Referee: Handwerker

15 November 1959 10	Eintracht Frankfurt	5–0	1. FC Schweinfurt 05	Frankfurt, West Germany
15:00 CEST	Lindner 9'; Bäumler 44' (pen.); Pfaff 58'; Meier 86'; Stein 87'	(Report)		Stadium: Waldstadion; Attendance: 9,000; Referee: Scheffer

21 November 1959 11	VfR Mannheim	1–1	Eintracht Frankfurt	Mannheim, West Germany
14:30 CEST	Hoffmann 25'	(Report)	Lindner 55'	Attendance: 12,000; Referee: Eckel

28 November 1959 12	Eintracht Frankfurt	3–2	Viktoria Aschaffenburg	Frankfurt, West Germany
14:30 CEST	Stein 2'; Bäumler 22'; Pfaff 35'	(Report)	Wille 52'; Buchwalter 67'	Stadium: Waldstadion; Attendance: 4,500; Referee: Treiber

5 December 1959 13	Eintracht Frankfurt	2–2	SSV Reutlingen 05	Frankfurt, West Germany
14:30 CEST	Lindner 6'; Bäumler 8'	(Report)	Sattler 28'; Gernhardt 61'	Stadium: Waldstadion; Attendance: 3,500; Referee: Riegg

13 December 1959 14	TSG Ulm 1846	0–1	Eintracht Frankfurt	Ulm, West Germany
		(Report)	Solz 10'	Stadium: Donaustadion; Attendance: 12,000; Referee: Meißner

27 December 1959 15	Eintracht Frankfurt	4–1	Karlsruher SC	Frankfurt, West Germany
14:00 CEST	Stinka 26'; Solz 40'; Dieter Lindner 49', 68'	(Report)	Wischnowski 58'	Stadium: Waldstadion; Attendance: 38,000; Referee: Fischer

3 January 1960 16	SpVgg Fürth	4–0	Eintracht Frankfurt	Fürth, West Germany
14:30 CEST	Gettinger 56'; Gottinger 65'; Heidner 70'; Schmidt 84'	(Report)		Stadium: Sportpark Ronhof; Attendance: 11,000; Referee: Jedele

9 January 1960 17	Eintracht Frankfurt	2–4	VfB Stuttgart	Frankfurt, West Germany
14:30 CEST	Stein 49'; Pfaff 69'	(Report)	Waldner 3'; Geiger 21', 24', 58'	Stadium: Waldstadion; Attendance: 13,000; Referee: Meißner

17 January 1960 18	Karlsruher SC	2–1	Eintracht Frankfurt	Karlsruhe, West Germany
	Lindner 18'	(Report)	Herrmann 30'; Wischnowski 46'	Stadium: Wildparkstadion; Attendance: 12,000; Referee: Dusch

24 January 1960 19	Eintracht Frankfurt	3–2	TSV 1860 München	Frankfurt, Germany
	Pfaff 14'; Solz 24'; Kress 31'		Kölbl 16'; Lihl 78'	Stadium: Riederwaldstadion; Attendance: 13,000; Referee: Deuschel

31 January 1960 20	Bayern Hof	1–0	Eintracht Frankfurt	Hof, West Germany
14:30 CEST	Horn 81'	(Report)		Stadium: Stadion Grüne Au; Attendance: 12,000; Referee: Handwerker

7 February 1960 21	Eintracht Frankfurt	2–1	FSV Frankfurt	Frankfurt, Germany
14:30 CEST	Weilbächer 70', 81'	(Report)	Hofmann 37'	Stadium: Riederwaldstadion; Attendance: 18,000; Referee: Eisemann

14 February 1960 22	Stuttgarter Kickers	0–2	Eintracht Frankfurt	Stuttgart, West Germany
14:30 CEST		(Report)	Lindner 73'; Kress 88'	Stadium: Neckarstadion; Attendance: 9,000; Referee: Kandelbinder

21 February 1960 23	Eintracht Frankfurt	3–1	1. FC Nürnberg	Frankfurt, Germany
14:30 CEST	Lindner 7', 33'; Pfaff 14'	(Report)	Albrecht 81'	Stadium: Riederwaldstadion; Attendance: 16,000; Referee: Jakobi

6 March 1960 24	FC Bayern Munich	3–0	Eintracht Frankfurt	Munich, West Germany
16:30 CEST	Sieber 32'; Grosser 37'; Huber 61'	(Report)		Stadium: Grünwalder Stadion; Attendance: 25,000; Referee: Deuschel

13 March 1960 25	Eintracht Frankfurt	3–2	Kickers Offenbach	Frankfurt, Germany
15:00 CEST	Weilbächer 40'; Meier 68'; Stein 85'	(Report)	Kaufhold 45'; Nuber 70'	Stadium: Riederwaldstadion; Attendance: 30,000; Referee: Ott

27 March 1960 26	1. FC Schweinfurt 05	4–2	Eintracht Frankfurt	Schweinfurt, West Germany
	Wendrich 17'; Schweighöfer 27' (76); Grübert 39'	(Report)	Meier 33'; Schymik 74'	Stadium: Willy-Sachs-Stadion; Attendance: 8,500; Referee: Hubbuch

3 April 1960 27	Eintracht Frankfurt	4–0	VfR Mannheim	Frankfurt, Germany
15:00 CEST	Stein 28', 87'; Pfaff 36'; Kress 83'	(Report)		Stadium: Riederwaldstadion; Attendance: 7,000; Referee: Scheuring

9 April 1960 28	Eintracht Frankfurt	1–1	TSG Ulm 1846	Frankfurt, Germany
17:00 CEST	Stein 7'	(Report)	Ruoff 28'	Stadium: Riederwaldstadion; Attendance: 7,000; Referee: Reil

24 April 1960 29	Viktoria Aschaffenburg	4–4	Eintracht Frankfurt	Aschaffenburg
	Hitzel 29'; Wille 49'; Buchwalter 54'; Kreuz 73'	(Report)	Stein 35', 53'; Meier 48'; Kress 82'	Stadium: Stadion am Schönbusch; Attendance: 6,000; Referee: Kreitlein

30 April 1960 30	SSV Reutlingen 05	2–3	Eintracht Frankfurt	Schwenningen, West Germany
	Dulz 17'; Sattler 47'	(Report)	Pfaff 24'; Stein 52', 85'	Stadium: Gustav-Strom-Stadion; Attendance: 10,000; Referee: Scheffler

==== League table ====
Position	Team	Played	Goals	Points
1.	Karlsruher SC	30	78-39	45-15
2.	Kickers Offenbach	30	75-45	39-21
3.	Eintracht Frankfurt (C)	30	81-57	37-23
4.	TSV 1860 München	30	65-56	35-25
5.	FC Bayern Munich	30	81-55	34-26 (Note: Due to a violation against the contract regulations Bayern were punished with a 4 point deduction. The deducation is considered in this table.)
6.	1. FC Nürnberg	30	73-54	34-26
7.	VfB Stuttgart	30	66-57	33-27
8.	SSV Reutlingen 05	30	55-57	31-29
9.	FSV Frankfurt	30	59-53	28-32
10.	VfR Mannheim	30	55-52	27-33
11.	SpVgg Fürth	30	48:59	26:34
12.	1. FC Schweinfurt 05	30	48-64	25-35
13.	Bayern Hof (P)	30	45-84	25-35
14.	TSG Ulm 1846	30	39-64	21-39
15.	Viktoria Aschaffenburg	30	43-73	21-39
16.	Stuttgarter Kickers (P)	30	38-80	15-45

	Participation at the 1960 German football championship round
	Participation at the qualification to the 1960 German football championship round
	Relegated to 1960–61 2. Oberliga Süd
(C)	1958–59 Oberliga Süd champions
(P)	Promoted from 1958–59 2. Oberliga Süd

=== DFB-Pokal / SFV-Pokal ===
==== 1958–59 ====
25 July 1959 Quarter-finals	Kickers Offenbach	1–3	Eintracht Frankfurt	Frankfurt, West Germany
18:00 CEST	Nuber 66'	(Report)	Pfaff 42', 75'; Kress 54'	Stadium: Waldstadion (Note: The match was moved to the Waldstadion due to safety reasons.); Attendance: 25,000; Referee: Jakobi

1 August 1959 Semi-finals	VfB Stuttgart	2–2 (a.e.t.)	Eintracht Frankfurt	Stuttgart, West Germany
	Weise 30'; Blessing 43'	(Report)	Stein 77'; Kress 85'	Stadium: Neckarstadion; Attendance: 30,000; Referee: Handwerker

16 August 1959 Semi-finals	Eintracht Frankfurt	5–0	VfB Stuttgart	Frankfurt, West Germany
15:00 CEST	Stein 15', 41', 81'; Bäumler 38'; Pfaff 56'	(Report)		Stadium: Waldstadion; Attendance: 28,000; Referee: Hubbuch

6 September 1959 Final	VfR Mannheim	1–0	Eintracht Frankfurt	Karlsruhe, West Germany
	Loy 13' (o.g.)	(Report)		Stadium: Wildparkstadion; Attendance: 15,000; Referee: Kandlbinder

==== 1959–60 ====
19 December 1959 1st Round	Rödelheimer FC	0–8	Eintracht Frankfurt
		(Report)	Stein 15', 22', 32', 57'; Bäumler 30', 45'; Kress 59'; Meier 83'	Attendance: 3,500; Referee: Wenzel

28 February 1960 2nd Round	SV Darmstadt 98	2–3	Eintracht Frankfurt
	Mühlbach 20'; Ley 78'	(Report)	Kress 60'; Bäumler 63'; Pfaff 73'	Attendance: 8,000; Referee: Rosenhausen

20 March 1960 3rd Round	Freiburger FC	2–3	Eintracht Frankfurt
	Lebefromm 7'; Burgert 16'	(Report)	Weilbächer 57'; Solz 81'; Stein 90'	Attendance: 9,000; Referee: Fischer

24 May 1960 Quarter-finals	Eintracht Frankfurt (Note: Eintracht bought Fürth's right to play at home for 16,000 DM.)	4–1	SpVgg Fürth	Frankfurt, Germany
	Stein 5', 81'; Lindner 13'; Kress 77'	(Report)	Schneider 57'	Stadium: Riederwaldstadion; Attendance: 7,000

11 June 1960 Semi-finals	Eintracht Frankfurt	4–2	FSV Frankfurt	Frankfurt, West Germany
	Stein 12', 18', 64'; Meier 78'	(Report)	Straub 37'; Niebel 66' (pen.)	Stadium: Waldstadion; Attendance: 13,000; Referee: Meißner

=== European Cup ===
3 September 1959 Preliminary round	Eintracht Frankfurt (West Germany)	(w/o) (Note: Initially, Kuopion Palloseura planned to move their home match to Schwenningen, West Germany, to generate more income. That plan was rejected by UEFA, so KuPS withdrew and Eintracht Frankfurt walkover.)	(Finland) KuPS

8 September 1959 Preliminary round	KuPS (Finland)	(w/o)	(West Germany) Eintracht Frankfurt

4 November 1959 2nd Round	BSC Young Boys (Switzerland)	1–4	(West Germany) Eintracht Frankfurt	Bern, Switzerland
	Eugen Meier 24'	(Report)	Weilbächer 4'; Stein 70'; Bäumler 78' (pen.); Erich Meier 83'	Stadium: Wankdorfstadion; Attendance: 33,322; Referee: Zariquiegui

25 November 1959 2nd Round	Eintracht Frankfurt (West Germany)	1–1	(Switzerland) BSC Young Boys	Frankfurt, West Germany
20:00	Bäumler 68' (pen.)	(Report)	Schneider 89'	Stadium: Waldstadion; Attendance: 30,800; Referee: Pérez

3 March 1960 Quarter-finals	Eintracht Frankfurt (West Germany)	2–1	(Austria) Wiener Sport-Club	Frankfurt, West Germany
20:00 CEST	Lindner 17'; Meier 59'	(Report)	Skerlan 48'	Stadium: Waldstadion; Attendance: 32,867; Referee: Quinard

16 March 1960 Quarter-finals	Wiener Sport-Club (Austria)	1–1	(West Germany) Eintracht Frankfurt	Vienna, Austria
	Hof 3'	(Report)	Stein 60'	Stadium: Praterstadion; Attendance: 47,423; Referee: Huber

13 April 1960 Semi-finals	Eintracht Frankfurt (West Germany)	6–1	(Scotland) Rangers	Frankfurt, West Germany
20:00 CEST	Stinka 28'; Pfaff 52', 55'; Lindner 73', 84'; Stein 87'	(Report)	Caldow 29' (pen.)	Stadium: Waldstadion; Attendance: 75,069; Referee: Lindberg

5 May 1960 Semi-finals	Rangers (Scotland)	3–6	(West Germany) Eintracht Frankfurt	Glasgow, Scotland
19:30 WET	McMillan 12', 53'; Wilson 73'	(Report)	Lindner 8'; Pfaff 20', 88'; Kress 27'; Meier 67', 69'	Stadium: Ibrox Park; Attendance: 68,578; Referee: Lööw

==== Final match ====
18 May 1960
19:30 BST

Real Madrid (Spain)	7–3	(West Germany) Eintracht Frankfurt
Di Stéfano 27', 30', 73'; Puskás 45+1', 56' (pen.), 60', 71'	Report	Kress 18'; Stein 72', 75'

Hampden Park, Glasgow
Attendance: 127,621
Referee: Jack Mowat (Scotland)

Real Madrid	Eintracht Frankfurt

GK	1	(Argentina) Rogelio Domínguez
RB	2	(Spain) Marquitos
LB	3	(Spain) Pachín
RH	4	(Spain) José María Vidal
CB	5	(Spain) José Santamaría (Note: Although Santamaría had amassed 20 caps for his native Uruguay from 1952 to 1957, he had been representing Spain in international play since 1958.)
LH	6	(Spain) José María Zárraga (c)
OR	7	(Brazil) Canário
IR	8	(Spain) Luis del Sol
CF	9	(Spain) Alfredo Di Stéfano (Note: Di Stéfano, a native Argentine, had represented both Argentina and Colombia earlier in his international career; however, he became a naturalised citizen of Spain in 1956, and began playing for the Spanish national team in 1957.)
IL	10	(Hungary) Ferenc Puskás
OL	11	(Spain) Paco Gento
Manager:
(Spain) Miguel Muñoz

GK	1	(West Germany) Egon Loy
RB	2	(West Germany) Friedel Lutz
LB	3	(West Germany) Hermann Höfer
RH	4	(West Germany) Hans Weilbächer (c)
CB	5	(West Germany) Hans-Walter Eigenbrodt
LH	6	(West Germany) Dieter Stinka
OR	7	(West Germany) Richard Kress
IR	8	(West Germany) Dieter Lindner
CF	9	(West Germany) Erwin Stein
IL	10	(West Germany) Alfred Pfaff
OL	11	(West Germany) Erich Meier
Manager:
(West Germany) Paul Oßwald

== Squad ==
=== Squad and statistics ===
No.	Pos	Nat	Player	Total		Oberliga		DFB-Pokal/SFV-Pokal		European Cup	
No.	Pos	Nat	Player	Apps	Goals	Apps	Goals	Apps	Goals	Apps	Goals
	GK	(West Germany) FRG	Hans-Günter Kirchhof	4	0	3	0	1	0	0	0
	GK	(West Germany) FRG	Egon Loy	42	0	27	0	8	0	7	0
	DF	(West Germany) FRG	Hans-Walter Eigenbrodt	25	0	15	0	6	0	4	0
	DF	(West Germany) FRG	Hermann Höfer	36	0	22	0	7	0	7	0
	DF	(West Germany) FRG	Fritz Kübert	1	0	0	0	1	0	0	0
	DF	(West Germany) FRG	Eberhard Schymik	30	1	21	1	5	0	4	0
	MF	(West Germany) FRG	Adolf Bechtold	14	0	11	0	2	0	1	0
	MF	(West Germany) FRG	Willi Herbert	1	0	0	0	1	0	0	0
	MF	(West Germany) FRG	Friedel Lutz	42	0	28	0	8	0	6	0
	MF	(West Germany) FRG	Severin Sorger	2	0	2	0	0	0	0	0
	MF	(West Germany) FRG	Dieter Stinka	42	2	28	1	7	0	7	1
	MF	(West Germany) FRG	Hans Weilbächer	44	5	29	3	8	1	7	1
	FW	(West Germany) FRG	Erich Bäumler	25	16	19	10	4	4	2	2
	FW	(West Germany) FRG	Richard Kress	39	14	24	7	9	5	6	2
	FW	(West Germany) FRG	Dieter Lindner	44	21	29	16	8	1	7	4
	FW	(West Germany) FRG	Erich Meier	26	10	14	4	6	2	6	4
	FW	(West Germany) FRG	Alfred Pfaff	40	20	25	12	8	4	7	4
	FW	(West Germany) FRG	Wolfgang Solz	11	4	9	3	2	1	0	0
	FW	(West Germany) FRG	Erwin Stein	37	43	24	24	7	14	6	5
	FW	(Hungary) HUN	István Sztáni	1	0	0	0	0	0	1	0

=== Transfers ===
In:

No.	Pos.	Nation	Player
—	GK	FRG	Willi Herbert (from Eintracht Frankfurt Academy)
—	GK	FRG	Fritz Kübert (from Eintracht Frankfurt Academy)
—	GK	FRG	Wolfgang Solz (from Eintracht Frankfurt Academy)
—	GK	FRG	Hans-Günter Kirchhof (from Waldhof Mannheim)
—	GK	FRG	Severin Sorger (from TuS Neuendorf)
—	GK	FRG	Erwin Stein (from SpVgg Griesheim 02)

Out:

No.	Pos.	Nation	Player
—	GK	FRG	Helmut Abraham (to Borussia Neunkirchen)
—	FW	FRG	Eckehard Feigenspan (to TSV 1860 Munich)
—	GK	FRG	Helmut Henig (retired)
—	FW	HUN	István Sztáni (to Standard Liège)

== See also ==
- 1959–60 European Cup
- 1960 European Cup Final

== Sources ==
- Matheja, Ulrich (2011). Unsere Eintracht - Eintracht Frankfurt - Die Chronik. Die Werkstatt. ISBN 978-3-89533-750-5.
