= 1961–62 Eintracht Frankfurt season =

Eintracht Frankfurt
1961–62 season
- Chairman: Rudolf Gramlich
- Manager: Paul Oßwald
- Oberliga Süd: 2nd / Runners-up
- DFB-Pokal / South German Cup: 1st round / Quarter-finals (qualification for DFB-Pokal)
- German football championship: 2nd / Runners-up
- Top goalscorer: League: Lothar Schämer (26); All: Erwin Stein (30)
- Highest home attendance: 71,000 15 April 1962 v 1. FC Nürnberg (league)
- Lowest home attendance: 9,000 7 January 1962 v SV Waldhof (league)
- Average home league attendance: 18,933

The 1961–62 Eintracht Frankfurt season was the 62nd season in the club's football history. In Oberliga Süd the club played in the Oberliga Süd, then one of many top tiers of German football. It was the club's 17th season in the Oberliga Süd. Eintracht finished the league as runners-up. In the German Championship Qualifiers the Eagles finished as 2nd.

== Matches ==
=== Legend ===
Win Draw Loss Postponed

=== Friendlies ===
22 July 1961	Bayern Hof (Germany)	1–5	(Germany) Eintracht Frankfurt	Hof, West Germany
	Stark 75'	Report	Stein 21', 59'; Schämer 64'; Solz 70', 76'	Stadium: Stadion Grüne Au; Attendance: 10,000; Referee: Kandelbinder

23 July 1961	1. FC Haßfurt (Germany)	3–3	(Germany) Eintracht Frankfurt	Haßfurt, West Germany
	Bayer 16'; Kreh (64.)(80.)	Report	Horn 42', 86'; Kress 49'	Attendance: 9,000; Referee: Scheuring

1 August 1961	Rot-Weiss Frankfurt (Germany)	1–8	(Germany) Eintracht Frankfurt	Frankfurt, West Germany
	Becker 58'	Report	Stein (5.)(80.)(87.)(89.); Kress 31'; Kreuz (53.)(71.)(77.)	Stadium: Stadion am Brentanobad; Attendance: 4,000; Referee: Berg

22 August 1961	Standard de Liège (Belgium)	0–2	(Germany) Eintracht Frankfurt	Liège, Belgium
		Report	Kreuz 20', 67'	Attendance: 15,000; Referee: Piavier

19 September 1961	SV Wiesbaden (Germany)	1–6	(Germany) Eintracht Frankfurt	Wiesbaden, West Germany
	Erber 19'	Report	Landerer 21' (pen.); Dieter Kraft 34', 38'; Stein 36', 66'; Lindner 40'	Stadium: Stadion an der Berliner Straße; Attendance: 6,000; Referee: Schreiner

4 October 1961	SL Benfica (Portugal)	2–3	(Germany) Eintracht Frankfurt	Lisbon, Portugal
	Cavém 2'; Coluna 23'	Report	Lindner 37'; Schämer 65'; Stein 74'	Stadium: Estádio da Luz; Attendance: 35,000

17 October 1961	Rangers (Scotland)	2–3	(Germany) Eintracht Frankfurt	Glasgow, Scotland
19:30 BST	Davis 52', 55'	Report	Kress 8'; Schämer 17'; Höfer 49'	Stadium: Hampden Park; Attendance: 104,679; Referee: Davidson

19 October 1961	Sheffield United (England)	3–1	(Germany) Eintracht Frankfurt	England
19:30 BST	Pace 3'; Russell 24'; Landerer 29' (o.g.)	Report	Stein 77'	Attendance: 20,000; Referee: Leafe

15 May 1962	Panathinaikos (Greece)	0–0	(Germany) Eintracht Frankfurt	Athens, Greece
		Report		Stadium: Leoforos Alexandras Stadium; Attendance: 15,000

19 May 1962	Malaya (Federation of Malaya)	2–4	(Germany) Eintracht Frankfurt	Kuala Lumpur, Malaya
	Abdul Ghani 22', 65'	Report	Schämer 19' (pen.); Solz 44'; Kress 60'; Stinka 71'	Stadium: Stadium Merdeka; Attendance: 10,000

21 May 1962	Bangkok XI (Thailand)	1–6	(Germany) Eintracht Frankfurt
	Goal	Report	Kress; Weber; Büttner; Solz

23 May 1962	Hong Kong XI	1–5	(Germany) Eintracht Frankfurt	Hong Kong
	Mok 23'	Report	Büttner 20', 43'; Kress 38'; 44'; Stein

26 May 1962	Hong Kong XI	3–7	(Germany) Eintracht Frankfurt	Hong Kong
	Goal	Report	Kress; Weilbächer; Solz; Schämer; Stinka	Attendance: 5,000

30 May 1962	San Francisco XI (United States)	2–3	(Germany) Eintracht Frankfurt	San Francisco, United States
	Goal	Report	Stein; Büttner	Attendance: 8,000

2 June 1962	Sheffield United (England)	4–1	(Germany) Eintracht Frankfurt	Vancouver, Canada
	Allchurch; Hodgson	Report	Büttner	Attendance: 18,000

6 June 1962	Winnipeg XI (Canada)	1–6	(Germany) Eintracht Frankfurt	Winnipeg, Canada
	Goal	Report	Stein; Büttner; Schämer	Attendance: 6,500

9 June 1962	Sheffield United (England)	4–0	(Germany) Eintracht Frankfurt	Toronto, Canada
	Kettleborough 2'; Pace	Report		Attendance: 12,000

12 June 1962	DAFB (German-American soccer association) (United States)	1–4	(Germany) Eintracht Frankfurt	New York City, United States
	Erbach 60'	Report	Stein 28', 50'; Stinka 67'; Büttner 84'	Stadium: Eintracht Oval; Attendance: 2,500

20 June 1962	SG Büdingen (Germany)	0–7	(Germany) Eintracht Frankfurt	Büdingen, West Germany
		Report	Solz 13', 56', 84', 85'; Stein 41', 89'; Kress 49'	Attendance: 3,000; Referee: Gehwal

=== Oberliga Süd ===
==== League fixtures and results ====
6 August 1961 1	1860 Munich	1–6	Eintracht Frankfurt	Munich, West Germany
	Brunnenmeier 83'	Report	Schämer 16', 70', 73', 78'; Höfer 33'; Lutz 37'	Stadium: Städtisches Stadion an der Grünwalder Straße; Attendance: 20,000; Referee: Handwerker

13 August 1961 2	Eintracht Frankfurt	5–4	Kickers Offenbach	Frankfurt, West Germany
15:00 CEST	Stein 1', 47'; Kreuz 3' (pen.); Schämer 24', 42'	Report	Lotz 21'; Gast 41', 58'; Kraus 44'	Stadium: Riederwaldstadion; Attendance: 30,000; Referee: Kreitlein

20 August 1961 3	SV Waldhof	1–3	Eintracht Frankfurt	Mannheim, West Germany
	Diehl 52'	Report	Schämer 17', 38'; Kreuz 48' (pen.)	Stadium: Stadion am Alsenweg; Attendance: 18,000; Referee: Meißner

27 August 1961 4	Eintracht Frankfurt	2–2	SSV Reutlingen	Frankfurt, West Germany
15:00 CEST	Horn 51'; Stein 72'	Report	Scheurer 46'; Dulz 83'	Stadium: Riederwaldstadion; Attendance: 10,000; Referee: Kandelbinder

3 September 1961 5	BC Augsburg	2–2	Eintracht Frankfurt	Augsburg, West Germany
	Späth 4'; Haller 43' (pen.); Hochstätter I (red card) 72'	Report	Kress 13'; Stinka 83'	Attendance: 25,000; Referee: Hubbuch

10 September 1961 6	FSV Frankfurt	0–5	Eintracht Frankfurt	Frankfurt, West Germany
		Report	Stein 31'; Schämer 43'; Kreuz 60'; Lindner 75', 84'	Stadium: Stadion am Bornheimer Hang; Attendance: 25,000; Referee: Tschenscher

16 September 1961 7	Eintracht Frankfurt	9–0	VfR Mannheim	Frankfurt, West Germany
16:30 CEST	Stinka 3'; Lindner 24', 31'; Kress 37'; Kreuz 53'; Höfer 68'; Weilbächer 74'; Schämer 85', 86'	Report		Stadium: Riederwaldstadion; Attendance: 12,000; Referee: Freimuth

24 September 1961 8	Karlsruher SC	1–2	Eintracht Frankfurt	Karlsruhe, West Germany
15:00 CEST	Witlatschil 32'	Report	Schämer 29'; Stein 70'	Stadium: Wildparkstadion; Attendance: 20,000; Referee: Dusch

1 October 1961 9	Eintracht Frankfurt	2–2	Bayern Munich	Frankfurt, West Germany
15:00 CEST	Stein 6'; Lindner 15'	Report	Ohlhauser 23'; Thimm 68'	Stadium: Riederwaldstadion; Attendance: 18,000; Referee: Schneider

15 October 1961 10	VfB Stuttgart	0–3	Eintracht Frankfurt	Stuttgart, West Germany
		Report	Kreuz 19'; Stein 42'; Stinka 84'	Stadium: Neckarstadion; Attendance: 30,000; Referee: Jakobi

29 October 1961 11	Eintracht Frankfurt	1–0	SpVgg Fürth	Frankfurt, West Germany
15:00 CEST	Schymik 46'	Report		Stadium: Riederwaldstadion; Attendance: 15,000; Referee: Klein

5 November 1961 12	Bayern Hof	1–2	Eintracht Frankfurt	Hof, West Germany
	Greim 88'	Report	Lindner 29'; Schymik 31'	Stadium: Stadion Grüne Au; Attendance: 16,000; Referee: Treiber

11 November 1961 13	Eintracht Frankfurt	5–1	Schwaben Augsburg	Frankfurt, West Germany
14:30 CEST	Stein 8', 18'; Kreuz 15', 24'; Kress 25'	Report	Metzger 46'	Stadium: Riederwaldstadion; Attendance: 12,000; Referee: Handwerker

19 November 1961 14	Eintracht Frankfurt	1–1	Schweinfurt 05	Frankfurt, West Germany
14:30 CEST	Schämer 72'	Report	Kupfer 36'	Stadium: Riederwaldstadion; Attendance: 12,000; Referee: Hubbuch

26 November 1961 15	1. FC Nürnberg	0–3	Eintracht Frankfurt	Nuremberg, West Germany
		Report	Schämer 56', 66'; Lindner 80'	Stadium: Städtisches Stadion; Attendance: 45,000; Referee: Tschenscher

10 December 1961 16	Eintracht Frankfurt	4–2	1860 Munich	Frankfurt, West Germany
	Horn 39'; Höfer 60'; Lutz 69'; Lindner 87'	Report	Brunnenmeier 30'; Küppers 43'	Stadium: Riederwaldstadion; Attendance: 17,000; Referee: Neumeier

17 December 1961 17	Kickers Offenbach	1–0	Eintracht Frankfurt	Offenbach, West Germany
14:15 CEST	Kraus 35'	Report		Stadium: Stadion am Bieberer Berg; Attendance: 22,000; Referee: Kreitlein

7 January 1962 18	Eintracht Frankfurt	3–0	SV Waldhof	Frankfurt, West Germany
14:15 CEST	Schämer 31'; Stinka 34'; Stein 57'	Report		Stadium: Riederwaldstadion; Attendance: 9,000; Referee: Ommerborn

14 January 1962 19	SSV Reutlingen	4–2	Eintracht Frankfurt	Reutlingen, West Germany
	Wodarzik 21'; Fritschi 46'; Scheurer 59', 77'	Report	Stein 6', 88'	Attendance: 18,000; Referee: Fischer

21 January 1962 20	Eintracht Frankfurt	1–0	BC Augsburg	Frankfurt, West Germany
14:15 CEST	Stinka 57'	Report		Stadium: Riederwaldstadion; Attendance: 10,000; Referee: Seiler

27 January 1962 21	Eintracht Frankfurt	4–0	FSV Frankfurt	Frankfurt, West Germany
14:30 CEST	Kreuz 37'; Schämer 50', 70'; Stinka 55'	Report		Stadium: Riederwaldstadion; Attendance: 23,000; Referee: Jakobi

4 February 1962 22	VfR Mannheim	1–1	Eintracht Frankfurt	Mannheim, West Germany
	Sauter 14'	Report	Horn 19'	Attendance: 11,000; Referee: Reil

10 February 1962 23	Eintracht Frankfurt	3–1	Karlsruher SC	Frankfurt, West Germany
15:30 CEST	Schämer 13', 68'; Lindner 70'	Report	Marx 63'	Stadium: Riederwaldstadion; Attendance: 18,000; Referee: Eckel

18 February 1962 24	Bayern Munich	2–0	Eintracht Frankfurt	Munich, West Germany
	Giesemann 71'; Röckenwagner 88'	Report		Attendance: 25,000; Referee: Tschenscher

25 February 1962 25	Eintracht Frankfurt	1–2	VfB Stuttgart	Frankfurt, West Germany
14:30 CEST	Schämer 14' (pen.)	Report	Höller 65'; Neupert 89'	Stadium: Riederwaldstadion; Attendance: 12,000; Referee: Mors

11 March 1962 26	SpVgg Fürth	1–0	Eintracht Frankfurt	Fürth, West Germany
	Eigenbrodt 34' (o.g.)	Report		Attendance: 9,000; Referee: Treiber

24 March 1962 27	Eintracht Frankfurt	5–2	Bayern Hof	Frankfurt, West Germany
16:30 CEST	Schämer 43', 43', 59'; Stein 38'; Kress 63'	Report	Greim 35'; Winterstein 67'	Stadium: Riederwaldstadion; Attendance: 15,000; Referee: Fritz

1 April 1962 28	Schwaben Augsburg	1–4	Eintracht Frankfurt	Augsburg, West Germany
	Georg Lechner 53'	Report	Stein 9'; Solz 15'; Schämer 64', 70'	Attendance: 12,000; Referee: Kreitlein

8 April 1962 29	Schweinfurt 05	3–0	Eintracht Frankfurt	Schweinfurt, West Germany
	Schweighöfer 25', 65'; Kupfer 69'	Report		Stadium: Willy-Sachs-Stadion; Attendance: 16,000; Referee: Neumeier

15 April 1962 30	Eintracht Frankfurt	2–1	1. FC Nürnberg	Frankfurt, West Germany
15:00 CEST	Stein 16', 26'	Report	Flachenecker 25'	Stadium: Waldstadion; Attendance: 71,000; Referee: Tschenscher

==== League table ====
Pos	Team	Pld	W	D	L	GF	GA	GD	Pts	Promotion, qualification or relegation
1	1. FC Nürnberg	30	20	3	7	70	30	+40	43	Qualification to German championship
2	Eintracht Frankfurt	30	19	5	6	81	37	+44	43	Qualification to German championship
3	Bayern Munich	30	17	6	7	67	55	+12	40	
4	Kickers Offenbach	30	16	5	9	65	50	+15	37	
5	VfB Stuttgart	30	13	8	9	66	53	+13	34	
6	Bayern Hof	30	12	8	10	55	56	−1	32	
7	1860 Munich	30	11	8	11	64	57	+7	30	
8	SSV Reutlingen	30	12	5	13	57	51	+6	29	
9	Karlsruher SC	30	8	12	10	47	44	+3	28	
10	VfR Mannheim	30	9	10	11	47	59	−12	28	
11	BC Augsburg	30	9	8	13	55	63	−8	26	
12	SpVgg Fürth	30	6	12	12	31	39	−8	24	
13	Schwaben Augsburg	30	10	3	17	43	78	−35	23	
14	Schweinfurt 05	30	9	4	17	39	63	−24	22	
15	FSV Frankfurt	30	7	7	16	35	65	−30	21	Relegation to 2. Oberliga Süd
16	SV Waldhof	30	6	8	16	39	61	−22	20	Relegation to 2. Oberliga Süd

Source: RSSSF.com
Rules for classification: 1) Points;

==== Results summary ====
Overall								Home						Away					
Pld	W	D	L	GF	GA	GD	Pts	W	D	L	GF	GA	GD	W	D	L	GF	GA	GD
30	19	5	6	81	37	+44	43	11	3	1	48	18	+30	8	2	5	33	19	+14

Source: Bundesliga

==== Results by round ====
Round	1	2	3	4	5	6	7	8	9	10	11	12	13	14	15	16	17	18	19	20	21	22	23	24	25	26	27	28	29	30
Ground	A	H	A	H	A	A	H	A	H	A	H	A	H	H	A	H	A	H	A	H	H	A	H	A	H	A	H	A	A	H
Result	W	W	W	D	D	W	W	W	D	W	W	W	W	D	W	W	L	W	L	W	W	D	W	L	L	L	W	W	L	W
Position	3	3	1	2	2	2	2	2	2	2	2	1	1	1	1	1	1	1	1	1	1	2	2	2	2	2	2	1	2	2

Updated to match(es) played on 1 January 2021. Source:
A = Away; H = Home; W = Win; D = Draw; L = Loss

=== German football championship ===
==== League fixtures and results ====
21 April 1962 1	Eintracht Frankfurt	1–3	1. FC Köln	Frankfurt, West Germany
17:30 CEST	Kress 40'	Report	Habig 34'; Thielen 46', 49'	Stadium: Waldstadion; Attendance: 48,000; Referee: Ott

28 April 1962 2	Eintracht Frankfurt	8–1	FK Pirmasens	Stuttgart, West Germany
	Stein 19', 26', 49', 59', 77'; Lindner 22', 88'; Kress 63'	Report	Matischak 66'	Stadium: Neckarstadion; Attendance: 40,000; Referee: Treichel

5 May 1962 3	Hamburger SV	1–2	Eintracht Frankfurt	Hamburg, West Germany
	Dörfel 21'	Report	Weilbächer 15'; Stein 44'	Stadium: Volksparkstadion; Attendance: 61,000; Referee: Schörnich

==== League table ====
Pos	Team	Pld	W	D	L	GF	GA	GD	Pts	Promotion, qualification or relegation
1	1. FC Köln	3	3	0	0	14	1	+13	6	Qualified to final
2	Eintracht Frankfurt	3	2	0	1	11	5	+6	4	
3	Hamburger SV	3	1	0	2	7	6	+1	2	
4	FK Pirmasens	3	0	0	3	4	24	−20	0	

Source: RSSSF.com
Rules for classification: 1) Points;

==== Results summary ====
Overall								Home						Away					
Pld	W	D	L	GF	GA	GD	Pts	W	D	L	GF	GA	GD	W	D	L	GF	GA	GD
3	2	0	1	11	5	+6	4	1	0	1	9	4	+5	1	0	0	2	1	+1

Source: Bundesliga

==== Results by round ====
Round	1	2	3
Ground	H	H	A
Result	L	W	W
Position	4	2	2

Updated to match(es) played on 1 January 2021. Source:
A = Away; H = Home; W = Win; D = Draw; L = Loss

=== DFB-Pokal / SFV-Pokal ===
==== DFB-Pokal ====
28 July 1961 1st Round	Eintracht Frankfurt	2–3 (a.e.t.)	1. FC Köln	Frankfurt, West Germany
20:00 CEST	Stein 10'; Horn 44'	Report	Schäfer 69', 70'; Müller 102'	Stadium: Waldstadion; Attendance: 12,000; Referee: Deuschel

==== SFV-Pokal ====
23 December 1961 1st Round	VfR 07 Limburg	3–5 (a.e.t.)	Eintracht Frankfurt	Limburg, West Germany
	Becker 8', 13', 39'	Report	Stinka 38', 103'; Schämer 43' (pen.); Stein 53', 110'	Attendance: 5,000; Referee: Wenzel

18 March 1962 2nd Round	SV Wiesbaden	0–5	Eintracht Frankfurt	West Germany
		Report	Stein 1', 10', 42', 51'; Stierstorfer 11' (o.g.)	Attendance: 5,000; Referee: Handwerker

9 May 1962 3rd Round	Eintracht Frankfurt	3–2	SpVgg Neu-Isenburg	Frankfurt, West Germany
20:00 CEST	Stein 34' (pen.); Lindner 58'; Landerer 74' (pen.)	Report	Kranz 40'; E Schneider 44'	Stadium: Waldstadion; Attendance: 6,000; Referee: Sparing

13 May 1962 Quarter-finals	Eintracht Frankfurt	2–0	SV Waldhof	Frankfurt, West Germany
	Kress 18'; Schämer 73' (pen.)	Report		Stadium: Waldstadion; Attendance: 2,500
Note: The tournament didn't continue after the quarter-finals since it already counted as qualification for the DFB-Pokal

== Squad ==
=== Squad and statistics ===
No.	Pos	Nat	Player	Total		Oberliga		DFB-Pokal		German Championship round	
No.	Pos	Nat	Player	Apps	Goals	Apps	Goals	Apps	Goals	Apps	Goals
	GK	(Germany) GER	Egon Loy	36	0	30	0	3	0	3	0
	GK	(Germany) GER	Wolfgang Zscherlich	2	0	0	0	2	0	0	0
	DF	(Germany) GER	Hermann Höfer	37	3	29	3	5	0	3	0
	DF	(Germany) GER	Eberhard Schymik	26	2	20	2	3	0	3	0
	MF	(Germany) GER	Peter Büttner	2	0	0	0	2	0	0	0
	MF	(Germany) GER	Hans-Walter Eigenbrodt	33	0	26	0	4	0	3	0
	MF	(Germany) GER	Ludwig Landerer	2	1	0	0	2	1	0	0
	MF	(Germany) GER	Friedel Lutz	22	2	20	2	2	0	0	0
	MF	(Germany) GER	Dieter Stinka	34	8	27	6	4	2	3	0
	MF	(Germany) GER	Hans Weilbächer	31	2	23	1	5	0	3	1
	FW	(Germany) GER	Alfred Horn	23	5	18	3	3	2	2	0
	FW	(Germany) GER	Richard Kress	37	7	30	4	4	1	3	2
	FW	(Germany) GER	Ernst Kreuz	24	8	22	8	2	0	0	0
	FW	(Germany) GER	Dieter Lindner	24	12	18	9	3	1	3	2
	FW	(Germany) GER	Erich Meier	3	0	1	0	1	0	1	0
	FW	(Germany) GER	Lothar Schämer	35	28	30	26	3	2	2	0
	FW	(Germany) GER	Wolfgang Solz	10	1	7	1	2	0	1	0
	FW	(Germany) GER	Erwin Stein	37	30	29	16	5	8	3	6

=== Transfers ===
In:

No.	Pos.	Nation	Player
—	MF	GER	Peter Büttner (from Eintracht Frankfurt Academy)
—	FW	GER	Alfred Horn (from Bayern Hof)
—	MF	GER	Ludwig Landerer (from TSG Ulm 1846)
—	GK	GER	Wolfgang Zscherlich (from Eintracht Frankfurt academy)

Out:

No.	Pos.	Nation	Player
—	GK	GER	Hans-Günter Kirchhof (to FSV Frankfurt)
—	FW	GER	Alfred Pfaff (retired)

== Sources ==
- German archive site (in German)
- Matheja, Ulrich (2011). Unsere Eintracht - Eintracht Frankfurt - Die Chronik. Die Werkstatt. ISBN 978-3-89533-750-5.

== See also ==
- 1962 German football championship
