= Eberhard Schymik =

German footballer (1934–1979)

Personal information
- Date of birth: 8 July 1934
- Place of birth: Gelnhausen, Germany
- Date of death: 8 September 1979 (aged 45)
- Position: Defender

Youth career
- 1. FC Gelnhausen

Senior career*
Years	Team	Apps	(Gls)
–1955	1. FC Gelnhausen		
1955–1964	Eintracht Frankfurt	191	(14)
- * Club domestic league appearances and goals

Eberhard Schymik (born 8 July 1934 – 8 September 1979) was a German footballer who played as a defender for Eintracht Frankfurt.

Schymik joined the Frankfurt side as from his hometown club 1. FC Gelnhausen and debuted in 1955. Until 1964, the defender gathered over 191 appearances and scored 14 goals. Wearing the Eintracht jersey he won the German championship in 1959.

Between 1955 and 1964 he appeared in 191 Oberliga matches scoring 14 goals. As Eintracht won the 1958–59 South German championship, he mostly played as right fullback or right halfback in the WM system in which the defensive player played in 24 league match that produced one goal by Schymik. He appeared in the first two German championship group stage matches before an injury stopped him from further matches in the competition.

== Career ==
Schymik began his career at hometown club 1. FC Gelnhausen. He signed for Eintracht in 1955–56, appearing 191 times until 1964. Further 1955 signings at Riederwald were Eckehard Feigenspan and Werner Heitkamp. On matchday one, on 27 August 1955 during the 3–0 home victory to 1860 Munich, the Gelnhausen local debuted in the Oberliga Süd. Besides fellows Alfons Remlein, Ernst Kudrass, Hermann Höfer and Hermann Hesse he formed the defensive line of Eintracht coach Kurt Windmann. After the season the Eagles finished on the sixth position in which Schmymik played in 25 Oberliga matches and contributed one goal. Also in the next two season he started as a regular player under coach Adolf Patek. In the year of the 1958 World Cup in Sweden, he only missed out on one Oberliga match and finished on third in the league.

With coach Paul Oßwald at helm, Eintracht won the (regionalised) 1958–59 Oberliga Süd and reached the German championship group stage. At the beginning of the season Eintracht signed another player from Gelnhausen, Dieter Stinka. Eintracht won the South German championship with two points ahead of local rivals Kickers Offenbach. In that season Schymik appeared 24 times and scored a goal under the coach who returned from Offenbach. In the group stage for the German championship the Hessians started with two wins against Werder Bremen (7–2) and FK Pirmasens (3–2). After the away victory at Bremen featuring a goal by Schymik 81,000 spectators attended the home match on 23 May against Pirmasens at Eintracht's Waldstadion. After this match Schymik suffered an injury and missed the rest of the season. The same applied for the outstanding principal defender Ivica Horvat. He also missed out on 26 league matches and three group stage matches due to injury and illness reasons the final match on 28 June 1959 in Berlin against South German runners-up Offenbach.

In the 1959–60 campaign the European Cup matches Schymik and his team mates were peaking. In four matches facing BSC Young Boys (4–1, 1–1) and Wiener SC (2–1, 1–1) Schymik played a competitively strong part in the Eintracht defence, especially in the second leg at Vienna on 16 March 1960. In the semi-finals against Rangers and the final against Real Madrid he was missing because of an injury. In his sixth Oberliga season, 1960–61, Schymik played all 30 league matches netting four times and Eintracht finished as runners-up and advanced to the final round once again. In August 1960, at the beginning of the season, he participated in the Ramón de Carranza Trophy in Cádiz competing against Athletic Bilbao, Stade de Reims and Real Madrid. In the group stage Schymik played four games as Eintracht failed to advance to the 1961 final championship game despite being even on points with group winners Borussia Dortmund (7–5 points). In both home matches against Hamburger SV (4–2 victory on 10 June with an attendance of 70,000 people) and Borussia Dortmund (2–1 loss on 14 June with 68,000 in attendance) he played as a right fullback competing against the wingers Gert Dörfel and Hans Cieslarczyk.

In the following 1961–62 campaign Schymik contributed 20 games and two goals when Eintracht finished as runners-up in the South. In the group stage that was cut short due to the World Cup in Chhile he played all three matches against 1. FC Köln, Hamburger SV and FK Pirmasens. The last season in the old regionalised first tier Oberliga in 1962–63, Eintracht Frankfurt concluded on fourth, with 14 matches and a goal by Schymik. With a 5–0 away victory at Schwaben Augsburg on 9 December 1962 in that a contributed a goal he ended active player career. The back line consisted of goalkeeper Egon Loy, Schymik and Hermann Höfer as defenders and the midfielders Alfred Horn, Ludwig Landerer and Dieter Stinka.

In the new founded Bundesliga Schymik did not get any appearance in the 1963–64 season.

The commercial clerk died on 8 September 1979, aged 45 years, on the stands of Waldstadion due to a cardial arrest when watching an Eintracht home match to Bayer Leverkusen.

== Honours ==
Eintracht Frankfurt

- German championship: 1958–59
- European Cup: runners-up 1959–60
- Oberliga Süd: 1958–59; runners-up 1960–61, 1961–62
- DFB-Pokal: runners-up 1963–64

== Sources ==
- Matheja, Ulrich (2004). Schlappekicker und Himmelsstürmer. Die Werkstatt. ISBN 3-89533-427-8.
- Grüne, Hardy (2006). Enzyklopädie des deutschen Ligafußballs. Band 8: Spielerlexikon 1890–1963. Agon-Sportverlag. ISBN 3-89784-148-7.
