= Dieter Lindner =

Dieter Lindner may refer to:

- Dieter Lindner (footballer) (1939–2024), German football player
- Dieter Lindner (racewalker) (1937–2021), former East German racewalker
