= 1959 German football championship =

1959 German championship
Deutsche Fußballmeisterschaft

Tournament details
- Country: West Germany
- Dates: 3 May – 28 June
- Teams: 9

Final positions
- Champions: Eintracht Frankfurt; 1st German title
- Runner-up: Kickers Offenbach
- European Cup: Eintracht Frankfurt

Tournament statistics
- Matches played: 26
- Goals scored: 122 (4.69 per match)
- Attendance: 1,241,000 (47,731 per match)
- Top goal scorer(s): Eckehard Feigenspan (12 goals)

The 1959 German football championship was the culmination of the football season in the Federal Republic of Germany in 1958–59. Eintracht Frankfurt were crowned champions for the first time after a group stage and a final.

It was Eintracht's second appearance in the German final, having previously lost to FC Bayern Munich in 1932. The team won all seven games it played in the finals. On the strength of this title, the club participated in the 1959–60 European Cup, where it became the first German club to reach the final.

For the losing finalist, Kickers Offenbach, it was its second time to reach the national title game, having lost to VfB Stuttgart in 1950. It was also the only time the final was contested by two clubs from the state of Hesse.

The format used to determine the German champion was very similar to the one used in the 1957 and 1958 season. Nine clubs qualified for the tournament, with the runners-up of North and Southwest having to play a qualifying match. The remaining eight clubs then played a home-and-away round in two groups of four, with the two group winners entering the final. In previous seasons, only a single round had been played in the group stage, increasing the number of group games per team from three to six from 1959.

== Qualified teams ==
The teams qualified for the finals through the 1958–59 Oberliga season:

Club	Qualified from
Hamburger SV	Oberliga Nord champions
SV Werder Bremen	Oberliga Nord runners-up
Westfalia Herne	Oberliga West champions
1. FC Köln	Oberliga West runners-up
Tasmania 1900 Berlin	Oberliga Berlin champions
FK Pirmasens	Oberliga Südwest champions
Borussia Neunkirchen	Oberliga Südwest runners-up
Eintracht Frankfurt	Oberliga Süd champions
Kickers Offenbach	Oberliga Süd runners-up

== Competition ==
=== Qualifying round ===
3 May 1959	Werder Bremen	6 – 3	Borussia Neunkirchen	Düsseldorf
	Schütz 15'; Schröder 17' (pen.), 83', 89'; Wilmovius 30'; Barth 51'		Ringel 70'; Follmann 74'; Meurer 75'	Stadium: Rheinstadion; Attendance: 32,000; Referee: Malka (Herten)

=== Group 1 ===
Pos	Team	Pld	W	D	L	GF	GA	GR	Pts	Qualification	SGE	KOE	FKP	SVW
1	Eintracht Frankfurt	6	6	0	0	26	11	2.364	12	Advance to final	—	2–1	3–2	4–2
2	1. FC Köln	6	2	1	3	10	14	0.714	5		2–4	—	3–2	2–2
3	FK Pirmasens	6	2	0	4	16	18	0.889	4		2–6	4–0	—	4–1
4	Werder Bremen	6	1	1	4	12	21	0.571	3		2–7	0–2	5–2	—

Source: RSSSF
Rules for classification: 1) Points; 2) Goal ratio.

16 May 1959	FK Pirmasens	4 – 0	1. FC Köln	Ludwigshafen
	Kapitulski 15', 57'; Seebach 47'; Schroer 59'			Stadium: Südweststadion; Attendance: 60,000; Referee: Kandlbinder (Regensburg)

16 May 1959	Werder Bremen	2 – 7	Eintracht Frankfurt	Bremen
	Schütz 34', 65'	(Report)	Kress 10'; Feigenspan 14', 23', 89'; Stinka 55'; Pfaff 80'; Schymik 88'	Stadium: Weserstadion; Attendance: 42,000; Referee: Baumgärtel (Hagen)

23 May 1959	Eintracht Frankfurt	3 – 2	FK Pirmasens	Frankfurt
	Feigenspan 41'; Sztáni 56', 62'		Kapitulski 37', 58'	Stadium: Waldstadion; Attendance: 81,000; Referee: Schulenburg (Hamburg)

23 May 1959	1. FC Köln	2 – 2	Werder Bremen	Cologne
	Brungs 6'; Röhrig 76'		Schütz 52'; Schröder 90'	Stadium: Müngersdorfer Stadion; Attendance: 38,000; Referee: Fritz (Oggersheim)

30 May 1959	FK Pirmasens	4 – 1	Werder Bremen	Ludwigshafen
	Kapitulski 12', 52'; Laag 22'; Seebach 39'		Barth 56'	Stadium: Südweststadion; Attendance: 40,000; Referee: Fischer (Augsburg)

30 May 1959	Eintracht Frankfurt	2 – 1	1. FC Köln	Frankfurt
	Kress 13'; Feigenspan 33'		Dörner 75' (pen.)	Stadium: Waldstadion; Attendance: 65,000; Referee: Treichel (Berlin)

7 June 1959	1. FC Köln	2 – 4	Eintracht Frankfurt	Cologne
	Fendel 19'; Röhrig 72'		Lindner 3'; Kress 27'; Feigenspan 64'; Meier 75'	Stadium: Müngersdorfer Stadion; Attendance: 35,000; Referee: Dusch (Kaiserslautern)

7 June 1959	Werder Bremen	5 – 2	FK Pirmasens	Bremen
	Schütz 13'; Schröder 62' (pen.); Schimeczek 69'; Barth 75'; Hagenacker 87'		Weishaar 2'; Seebach 57'	Stadium: Weserstadion; Attendance: 20,000; Referee: Thier (Gelsenkirchen)

13 June 1959	FK Pirmasens	2 – 6	Eintracht Frankfurt	Ludwigshafen
	Kapitulski 59' (pen.); Lutz 78' (o.g.)		Kress 2', 80'; Feigenspan 4', 22' (pen.); Sztáni 19'; Lindner 72'	Stadium: Südweststadion; Attendance: 50,000

13 June 1959	Werder Bremen	0 – 2	1. FC Köln	Bremen
			Jost 61'; Bisanz 85'	Stadium: Weserstadion; Attendance: 25,000; Referee: Eckel (Munich)

20 June 1959	Eintracht Frankfurt	4 – 2	Werder Bremen	Frankfurt
	Sztáni 23', 51'; Pfaff 43'; Feigenspan 89'		Schütz 35'; Wilmovius 39'	Stadium: Waldstadion; Attendance: 26,000; Referee: Thier (Gelsenkirchen)

20 June 1959	1. FC Köln	3 – 2	FK Pirmasens	Cologne
	Müller 15', 64'; Jost 41'		Seebach 28', 55'	Stadium: Müngersdorfer Stadion; Attendance: 12,000; Referee: Schulenburg (Hamburg)

=== Group 2 ===
Pos	Team	Pld	W	D	L	GF	GA	GR	Pts	Qualification	KOF	HSV	SCW	SCT
1	Kickers Offenbach	6	4	1	1	14	9	1.556	9	Advance to final	—	3–2	2–1	3–2
2	Hamburger SV	6	4	0	2	13	8	1.625	8		1–0	—	4–2	3–0
3	Westfalia Herne	6	2	0	4	8	13	0.615	4		1–4	3–1	—	1–0
4	Tasmania Berlin	6	1	1	4	6	11	0.545	3		2–2	0–2	2–0	—

Source: RSSSF
Rules for classification: 1) Points; 2) Goal ratio.

Date	Match			Result	Stadium	Attendance
16 May 1959	Westfalia Herne	–	Tasmania 1900 Berlin	1–0 (1–0)	Dortmund, Stadion Rote Erde	30,000
16 May 1959	Kickers Offenbach	–	Hamburger SV	3–2 (0–2)	Frankfurt am Main, Waldstadion	80,000
23 May 1959	Hamburger SV	–	Westfalia Herne	4–2 (2–0)	Hamburg, Volksparkstadion	70,000
23 May 1959	Tasmania 1900 Berlin	–	Kickers Offenbach	2–2 (0–2)	Berlin, Olympiastadion	70,000
30 May 1959	Tasmania 1900 Berlin	–	Hamburger SV	0–2 (0–0)	Berlin, Olympiastadion	90,000
30 May 1959	Westfalia Herne	–	Kickers Offenbach	1–4 (0–1)	Dortmund, Stadion Rote Erde	45,000
7 June 1959	Hamburger SV	–	Tasmania 1900 Berlin	3–0 (0–0)	Hamburg, Volksparkstadion	65,000
7 June 1959	Kickers Offenbach	–	Westfalia Herne	2–1 (0–0)	Frankfurt am Main, Waldstadion	56,000
13 June 1959	Westfalia Herne	–	Hamburger SV	3–1 (1–1)	Dortmund, Stadion Rote Erde	42,000
13 June 1959	Kickers Offenbach	–	Tasmania 1900 Berlin	3–2 (0–1)	Frankfurt am Main, Waldstadion	35,000
20 June 1959	Hamburger SV	–	Kickers Offenbach	1–0 (0–0)	Hamburg, Volksparkstadion	65,000
20 June 1959	Tasmania 1900 Berlin	–	Westfalia Herne	2-0 (0–0)	Berlin, Olympiastadion	22,000

=== Final ===
28 June 1959
15:00 CET

Eintracht Frankfurt	5–3 (a.e.t.)	Kickers Offenbach
Sztáni 1', 108'; Feigenspan 14', 92' (pen.), 119'	Report	Kraus 8'; Preisendörfer 23'; Gast 110'

Olympiastadion, Berlin
Attendance: 75,000
Referee: Erich Asmussen (Flensburg)
