= Eckehard Feigenspan =

German footballer

Personal information
- Date of birth: 13 May 1935 (age 91)
- Place of birth: Wöllstadt, Germany
- Position: Forward

Senior career*
Years	Team	Apps	(Gls)
- FC Nieder-Wöllstadt
–1955	VfB Friedberg		
1955–1959	Eintracht Frankfurt	79	(52)
1959–1962	1860 Munich	41	(20)
1962–1967	Rot-Weiss Essen	80	(34)
1967	SSVg Velbert		

International career
- Germany B
- * Club domestic league appearances and goals

Eckehard Feigenspan (born 13 May 1935) is a German former professional footballer who played as a forward. He was capped twice for the Germany B national team.

== German championship 1959 ==
The 19-year-old striker Feigenspan moved in 1954 from FC Nieder-Wöllstadt to VfB Friedberg in the first amateur league of Hessen. After only one season, he received an offer from Eintracht Frankfurt and eventually signed in 1955 at the Eagles for their Oberliga South campaign. At match day two, he debuted at the 5–3 away win at Stuttgarter Kickers. Together with Erich Bäumler, Hans Weilbächer, Richard Kress and Alfred Pfaff he formed the attack at Eintracht. In his first season 1955–56 he could appear in 13 matches, netting five goals. In his fourth season at Frankfurt, 1958–59, Paul Oßwald's Eintracht won the Southern German championship, hence reached the final round of the German championship and then the final match. To this success Ekko Feigenspan contributed 21 goals in 27 matches. In the final round the Oßwald team won all six matches against Werder Bremen, FK Pirmasens and 1. FC Köln with Feigenspan he scoring nine more goals. In the final match on 28 June 1959 in Berlin, he could score three additional goals to the 5–3 win after overtime against rivals Kickers Offenbach. His offensive partners were Richard Kress, István Sztáni, Alfred Pfaff and Dieter Lindner. After the championship win, he moved to 1860 München because he wanted to continue his engineering studies. In 79 Oberliga appearances for Eintracht he scored 52 goals.

== 1860 München and Rot-Weiß Essen, 1959 until 1967 ==
Germany manager Sepp Herberger tested Feigenspan on 3 October and 8 November 1959 twice in the B squad against Switzerland and Hungary, but since Feigenspan had never caught a regular spot at the Lions from Munich in three seasons, he was not capped anymore. Alfred Heiß, Hans Küppers, Rudi Brunnenmeier and Johann Auernhammer were first choice striker for manager Max Merkel, so Feigenspan left 1860 in the summer of 1962 after 41 Oberliga appearances and 20 goals for the Western German club Rot-Weiß Essen playing in die 2nd Oberliga West. In the last season of the old league system (regional Oberligas) RWE reached the sixth rank and qualified for the second tier (Regionalliga West) for the 1963–64 season. After finishing as tenth and seventh in 1964 and 1965 respectively, Essen reached under Fritz Pliska the second place in 1965–66, qualifying for the promotion round for the Bundesliga, while Fortuna Düsseldorf won the Regionalliga West and Alemannia Aachen finished third. In three seasons in the Regionalliga Feigenspan netted 34 times in 80 appearances. In the promotion round the Red and whites prevailed with 8–4 points before FC St. Pauli. In four out of six matches the 31-year-old Feigenspan appeared. Further attackers were Heinz-Dieter Hasebrink, Willi Koslowski, Willi Lippens, Helmut Littek and Herbert Weinberg. On the first Bundesliga match day of the 1966–67 season, on 20 August 1966, Feigenspan made his last match for Essen, when they lost against MSV Duisburg 0–2. "Ekko“ made up the defender pair with Adolf Steinig.

In the summer of 1967, Feigenspan moved back to amateur football, joining SSVg Velbert.
