= Erwin Stein (footballer) =

German footballer (1935–2024)

Personal information
- Date of birth: 10 June 1935
- Place of birth: Frankfurt, Gau Hesse-Nassau, Germany
- Date of death: 26 July 2024 (aged 89)
- Position: Forward

Youth career
- 1945–1951: SG Bornheim
- 1951–1954: FFC Olympia 07

Senior career*
Years	Team	Apps	(Gls)
1954–1959	SpVgg Griesheim 02		
1959–1966	Eintracht Frankfurt	148	(89)
1966–1969	Darmstadt 98		
1969–1970	SpVgg Griesheim 02		

International career
1959	West Germany	1	(1)
- * Club domestic league appearances and goals

Erwin Stein (10 June 1935 – 26 July 2024) was a German professional footballer who played as a forward.

== Career ==
As a ten-year-old boy, Stein started to play football at SG Bornheim. Later he moved to Olympia 07 and then, from 1954, played at SpVgg Griesheim 02. At 24 years old, he was capped by Bundestrainer Sepp Herberger and his assistant Georg Gawliczek for the German amateur national team against the Netherlands on 15 April 1959 in Enschede. The pacy attacker played well and netted twice in the 2–0 win. Due to the final round of the German championship starting on 16 May, national team manager Herberger, picked the Hessian amateur player for the friendly match against Poland in Hamburg. Coming on in the 63rd minute, Stein scored the equaliser in the 81st minute, the final result. On 27 May, he was capped for the second time for the amateur national team. He netted both goals in a 2–0 victory against England. When Luxembourg celebrated its 50th anniversary a match was scheduled between a Belgian and a German XI. Belgium won 3–1 but Stein scored the only goal for the DFB squad. In the final of the German championship, Eintracht Frankfurt played on 28 June 1959 against Kickers Offenbach. Eintracht won in overtime 5–3 with Eckehard Feigenspan scoring three times for Frankfurt. With Feigenspan moving to TSV 1860 Munich, the Eintracht board negotiated intensely with the Griesheim 02 striker. Stein signed for the Riederwald club for the 1959–60 season and was therefore not eligible for the German amateur national team. Since the qualification matches for the 1960 Summer Olympics took place in November 1959 against Finland and Poland, it was a blow for the DFB's plans to take part at the Olympics. Stein debuted for the Eagles on 23 August 1959 at Eintracht's first season match against SpVgg Fürth. He contributed two goals in a 53 victory against Frankfurt. He carried on showing his scoring qualities in the Oberliga Süd but Sepp Herberger never called him up again. At the end of the 1959–60 Oberliga season he had scored 24 goals, plus, in the European Cup final on 18 May 1960 at Glaswegian Hampden Park against Real Madrid, he scored two goals in the 3–7 loss against legendary José Santamaría (nickname "the wall"). His sportive performances were great, but Herberger never forgave him his "escape" from the amateur national team.

=== Eintracht Frankfurt, 1959–66 ===
In seven years at Eintracht, Stein appeared 342 times (friendlies included) and netted 267 times. In the Oberliga Süd, he played from 1959 until 1963 in 107 matches and managed to score 75 goals. Between 1961 and 1962 he became runner-up in the Southern Oberliga and played in the final round with Eintracht. In the Bundesliga he had two more good seasons between 1963 and 1965. He bid farewell as an Eintracht active player on 4 September 1965 at Hannover 96, playing with Jürgen Grabowski and Wolfgang Solz. From 1963 until 1966, he contributed 14 goals in Bundesliga 41 matches for the Hessian team. Which that team he reached the DFB-Pokal final against 1860 Munich on 13 June 1964 which the Eagles lost 0–2 to the Lions.

=== SV Darmstadt 98, 1966–1969 ===
Stein played three seasons in the Regionalliga Süd for the "Lilies". In 83 fixtures, he scored 18 goals, playing in midfield.

He ended his career at his home club Griesheim after the 1969–70 season.

== After playing ==
Stein operated a tobacco store in Frankfurt-Griesheim which also sold lottery tickets. He died on 26 July 2024, at the age of 89.
