= Fritz Kübert (footballer, born 1939) =

German footballer

Personal information
- Full name: Fritz Kübert
- Date of birth: 8 December 1939
- Date of death: 1 September 1997 (aged 57)
- Position: Defender

Youth career
- 1952–1958: Eintracht Frankfurt

Senior career*
Years	Team	Apps	(Gls)
1958–1960	Eintracht Frankfurt Am.		
1960–1965	Eintracht Frankfurt	1	(0)
- * Club domestic league appearances and goals

Fritz Kübert (8 December 1939 – 1 September 1997) was a German footballer who played as a defender for Eintracht Frankfurt.

== Career ==
Kübert joined Eintracht Frankfurt in 1952. He made his first and only appearance for the club in the Bundesliga on 19 September 1964 against Karlsruher SC. The home match finished as a 0–7 loss for Frankfurt.

== Personal life ==
Kübert was the son of Fritz Kübert I, former player, committee member, youth coach and honorary member of Eintracht Frankfurt. Kübert died on 1 September 1997 at the age of 57.
