= Egon Loy =

German footballer (1931–2026)

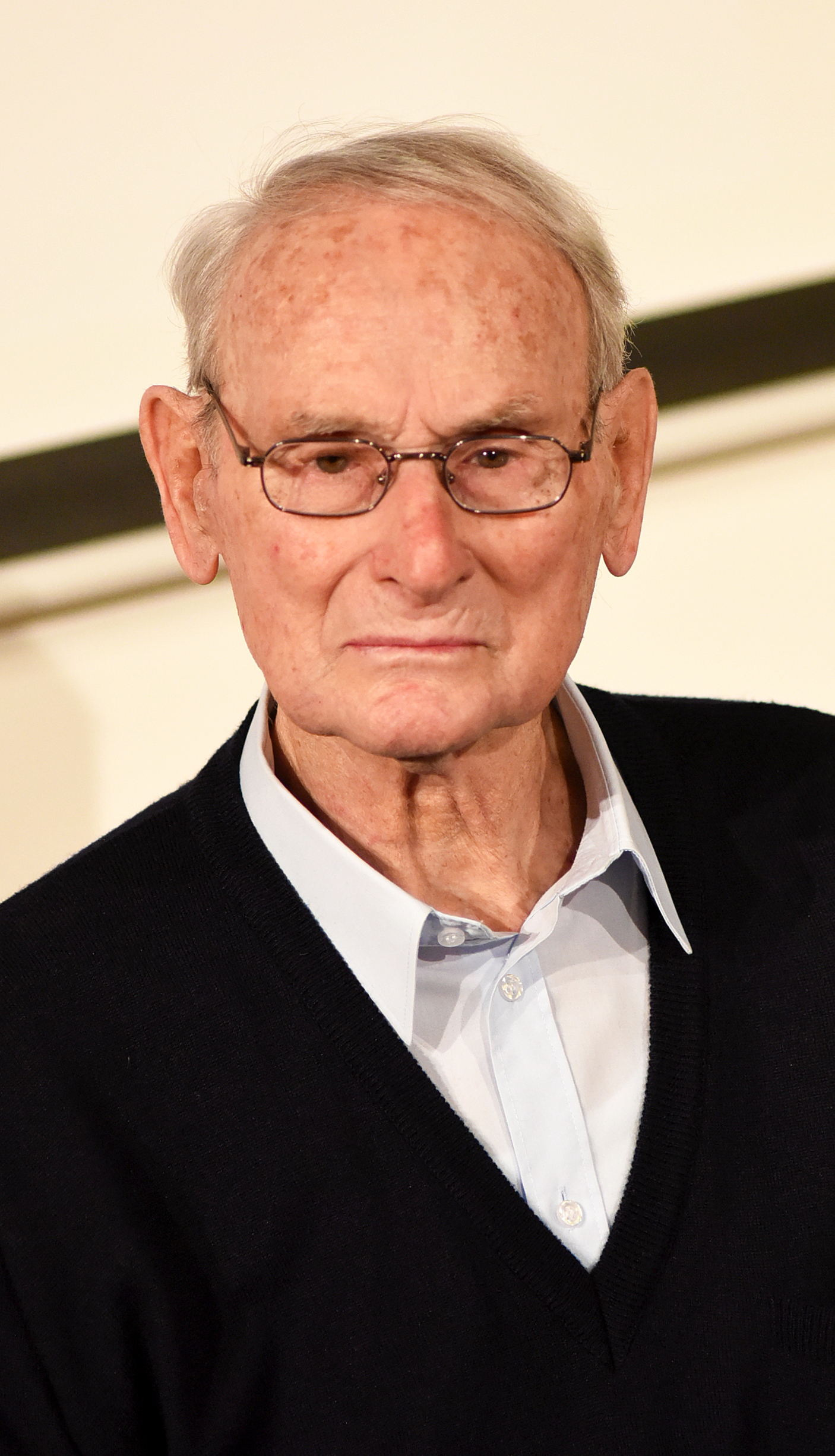
- Loy in 2023

Personal information
- Date of birth: 14 May 1931
- Place of birth: Germany
- Date of death: 15 May 2026 (aged 95)
- Position: Goalkeeper

Senior career*
Years	Team	Apps	(Gls)
–1954	TSV 04 Schwabach		
1954–1967	Eintracht Frankfurt	278	(0)
- * Club domestic league appearances and goals

Egon Loy (14 May 1931 – 15 May 2026) was a German professional footballer who played as a goalkeeper.

== Early career ==
Egon Loy spent the first years of his senior career in Schwabach near Nuremberg. From local side TSV 04 Schwabach he was promoted to the first Bavarian amateur league. Until 1954 he played with his home club in the highest amateur tier of Bavaria. Loy had the backing of the Bavarian association selection and won the Länderpokal of the amateurs three times from 1952 until 1954. Erich Bäumler, Ludwig Hinterstocker and Johann Zeitler were the strikers, scoring many goals. On 30 May 1954, Loy played for the Germany national amateur football team in Longwy against France. It was the only amateur international match in 1954, ending 0–0. In the 1954–55 season he moved to Eintracht Frankfurt. His team mate from the Bavaria selection, Erich Bäumler, also signed with the Hessian club.

== Eintracht Frankfurt, 1954 until 1967 ==
His debut in the Oberliga Süd led the former amateur on 22 August 1954 to the local Mainderby at Bieberer Berg in Offenbach. Egon Loy played well at the 1–0 away win and could secure a regular spot. He played 28 times for Eintracht and finished the season as fourth. The Frank had a heavy knee injury and could only play one match in his second Eintracht season in 1955–56 and even in the 1956–57 campaign he had to fight for his comeback. The next season, he recovered. Egon Loy absolved all 30 Oberliga fixtures and finished third. On 17 November 1957, he got a call up for the South German selection against South West Germany. For the 1958–59 season former Offenbach manager Paul Oßwald moved to Frankfurt. The squad from Riederwald won the South German championship and lost not a point in the final round, advancing to the German championship final.

On 28 June 1959, Loy and his team mates won the German championship 5–3 after overtime against Kickers Offenbach in Berlin. In 1959–60, Frankfurt played in the European Cup competition. The semi final matches against Scottish side Rangers on 13 April and 5 May 1960 were especially impressive. After a sensational 6–1 win at home, Eintracht then won 6–3 at Ibrox Park in Glasgow. The final match on 18 May at Hampden Park against the title holder Real Madrid was a football festival, despite the 7–3 loss. Alfredo Di Stefano und Ferenc Puskás showed why they were considered as the biggest stars of the competition. In the last three season of the Oberliga Süd from 1960–61 until 1962–63, Loy appeared in all 90 fixtures.

In the next two campaigns of the new founded Bundesliga, 1963–64 and 1964–65, the Schwabach native was still an unchallenged regular between the Eintracht pipes. He also played in Stuttgart the DFB-Pokal final on 13 June 1964 against TSV 1860 München. The Lions won 2–0 against Frankfurt. From 1965–66 on the former amateur national goal keeper Peter Kunter who came from Eintracht Wetzlar became number one of the Eagles. Loy played his last Bundesliga match on 8 October 1966 against MSV Duisburg.

In total, Egon Loy played 69 Bundesliga matches between 1963 and 1966.

== Death ==
Loy died on 15 May 2026, one day after his 95th birthday.

== Honours ==
Eintracht Frankfurt

- German championship: 1958–59
- European Cup runner-up: 1959–60
- Oberliga Süd: 1958–59; runner-up 1960–61, 1961–62
- DFB-Pokal runner-up: 1963–64
- UEFA Intertoto Cup: 1966–67
