= Helmut Kapitulski =

German footballer

Personal information
- Date of birth: 29 September 1934 (age 92)
- Place of birth: Dortmund, Germany
- Position: Midfielder

Youth career
- 1946–1953: Borussia Dortmund

Senior career*
Years	Team	Apps	(Gls)
1953–1957	Borussia Dortmund	76	(15)
1957–1964	FK Pirmasens	176	(125)
1964–1968	1. FC Kaiserslautern	98	(22)
1968–1970	FK Pirmasens		
1970–1973	FC Dahn		

International career
1958	West Germany	1	(0)
- * Club domestic league appearances and goals

Helmut Kapitulski (born 29 September 1934) is a German former footballer who played as a midfielder.
