= Herbert Dörner =

German footballer

Personal information
- Full name: Herbert Dörner
- Date of birth: 14 July 1930
- Place of birth: Germany
- Date of death: 26 March 1991 (aged 60)
- Position: Midfielder

Senior career*
| Years | Team | Apps | (Gls) |
| 1950–1953 | Preußen Dellbrück | | |
| 1953–1959 | 1. FC Köln | | |
| 1959–1963 | Bonner SC | | |

International career
| 1956 | West Germany | 2 | (0) |
- * Club domestic league appearances and goals

Herbert Dörner (14 July 1930 – 26 March 1991) was a German international footballer who played for Preußen Dellbrück, 1. FC Köln and Bonner SC.
