= Hermann Nuber =

German footballer (1935–2022)

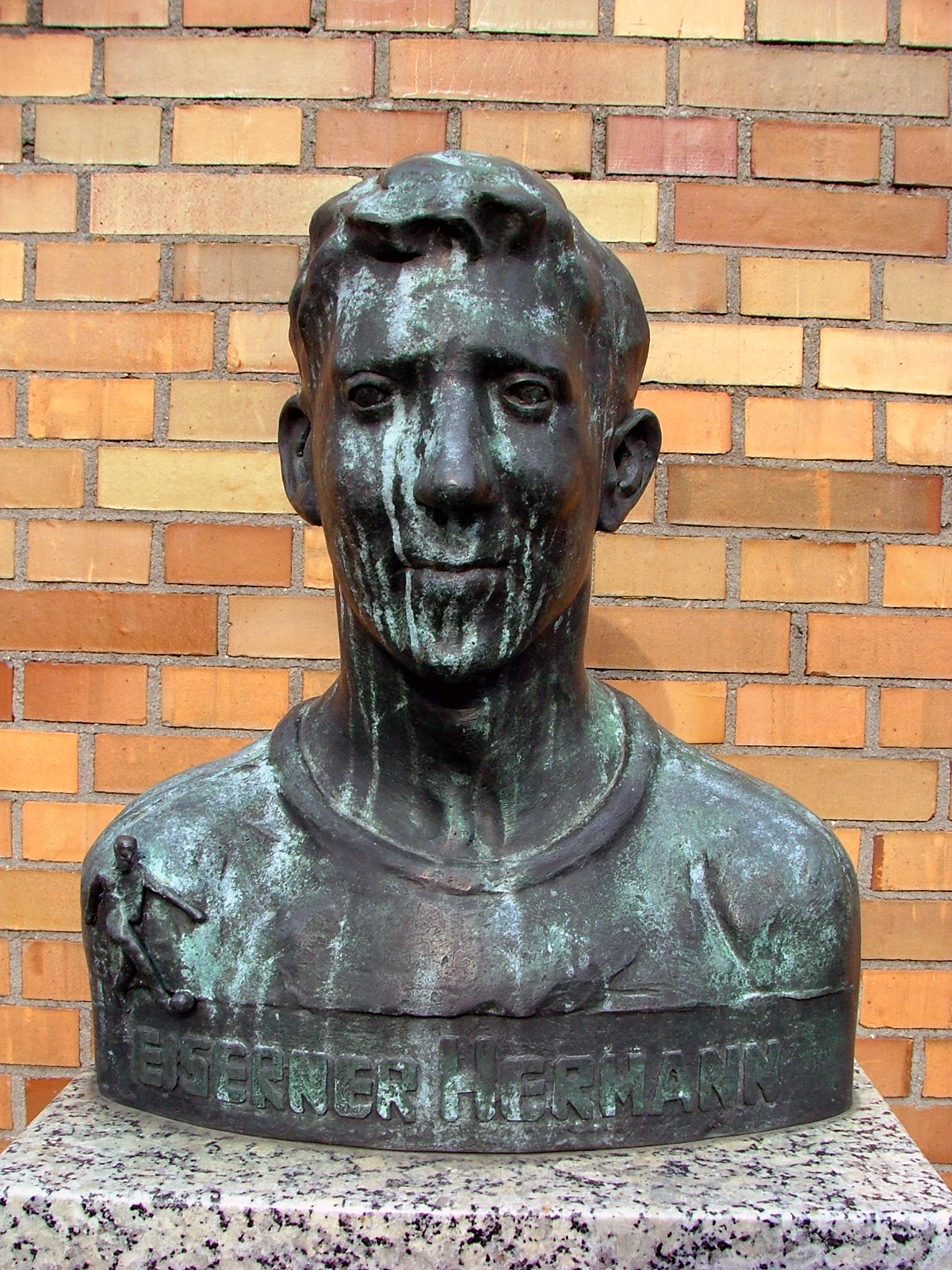
- Bust of Nuber

Personal information
- Date of birth: 10 October 1935
- Place of birth: Offenbach, Hesse, Germany
- Date of death: 12 December 2022 (aged 87)
- Place of death: Offenbach, Hesse, Germany
- Height: 1.81 m (5 ft 11 in)
- Positions: Inside forward; libero

Senior career*
Years	Team	Apps	(Gls)
1953–1971	Kickers Offenbach	408	(164)

International career
- Germany youth

Managerial career
- 1984: Kickers Offenbach
- * Club domestic league appearances and goals

Hermann Nuber (10 October 1935 – 12 December 2022) was a German footballer who played as an Inside forward or libero for Kickers Offenbach. A one-club man, he reached the final of the 1959 German football championship with the club.

== Club career ==
Nuber joined Kickers Offenbach as a youth in 1946. In 1953, at the age of 17, he made his senior debut in a DFB-Pokal match against Wormatia Worms. A regular starter from 1955 onwards, he helped the club reach the final of the 1959 German football championship against Eintracht Frankfurt. When the Bundesliga was founded in 1963, Kickers Offenbach started in the Regionalliga, Germany's second tier at the time. In 1968 Kickers Offenbach gained promotion to the Bundesliga while Nuber was placed second behind Franz Beckenbauer in Germany's footballer of the year awards. Nuber retired from playing in 1969, after Kickers Offenbach's relegation from the Bundesliga, missing the club's win of the 1970–71 DFB-Pokal. He briefly returned to play in the Bundesliga for coach Rudi Gutendorf in 1971. He made 408 league appearances scoring 164 goals between 1953 and 1971.

== International career ==
Nuber played for Germany at youth level. He was part of the West Germany national team's 22-man squad for the 1958 FIFA World Cup, being one of four players remaining in Germany waiting to be called up.

== Style of play ==
Nuber played as an Inside forward and later as a libero. He was an ambidextrous free-kick specialist, good on the ball and known for his competitive spirit.

== Coaching career ==
Nuber was twice interim coach at Kickers Offenbach, one of those occasions coming in 1983–84, the club's last season in the Bundesliga. He spent 15 years as amateur and youth coach, discovering and fostering a number of well-known footballers.

== Legacy ==
A bronze bust honouring Nuber was installed at Bieberer Berg Stadion, Kickers Offenbach's home stadium, on his 60th birthday in 1995. In summer 2022 the stadium's grandstand was named "Hermann-Nuber-Tribüne" in his honour. Upon his death, Offenbach local paper Offenbach-Post described him as the club's "most popular" player.

== Death ==
Nuber died on 12 December 2022 in his hometown Offenbach, at the age of 87.

== Honours ==
Kickers Offenbach

- German football championship: runner-up 1959

Individual

- Footballer of the Year (Germany): second-place 1968
