= Josef Röhrig =

German footballer

Personal information
- Date of birth: 28 February 1925
- Place of birth: Zündorf, Germany
- Date of death: 12 February 2014 (aged 88)
- Place of death: Cologne
- Position: Midfielder

Senior career*
Years	Team	Apps	(Gls)
1941–1943	VfL Köln 1899		
1950–1960	1. FC Köln		

International career
1950–1956	West Germany	12	(2)
- * Club domestic league appearances and goals

Josef Röhrig (28 February 1925 – 12 February 2014) was a German footballer who played as a midfielder.

== Club career ==
Röhrig was born in Zündorf, a Cologne suburb, and played after World War II for the then newly founded 1. FC Köln for a decade. He was part of the team which reached the 1954 final of the DFB-Pokal and the 1960 decider for the West German football championship but lost on both occasions.

== International career ==
Röhrig also made sporadic appearances for the West Germany national football team between 1950 and 1956, playing 12 times and scoring two goals.

== Honours ==
- DFB-Pokal runner-up, 1954
- German football championship runner-up, 1960
