= Südweststadion =

Stadium in Ludwigshafen, Germany

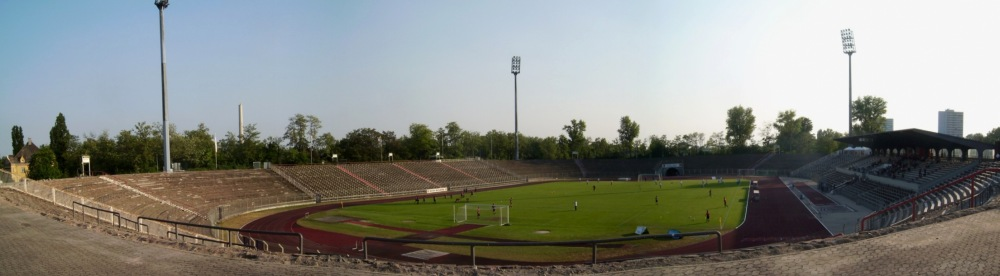
- Panoramic overview Südweststadion
- Interactive map of Südweststadion
- Full name: Südweststadion
- Location: Ludwigshafen am Rhein, Germany
- Coordinates: 49°28′6″N 8°26′29″E
- Owner: Ludwigshafen am Rhein
- Capacity: 6,000
- Surface: Grass
- Record attendance: 82,000
- Field size: 103 x 67 metres

Construction
- Built: 1946 - 1950
- Opened: 11 November 1950
- Renovated: 2007

Tenants
- FC Arminia 03 Ludwigshafen (1952 - 1979); SV Waldhof Mannheim (1983 - 1989); FSV Oggersheim (2005 - 2009); 1. FC Kaiserslautern (incidental)

Südweststadion is a multi-purpose stadium in Ludwigshafen am Rhein, Germany and was built in 1950, at which time it could hold 41,383 people. After a renovation in 2007, the maximum capacity was limited to 6,000 people. It is currently used mostly for football matches and is occasionally used as the home ground by FSV Oggersheim. The stadium has hosted several important games, such as four international matches of West Germany, two West German Cup finals and the Bundesliga championship match.

== History ==
In 1937, the first stadium was constructed on the site of the current Südweststadion. The new stadium was named after Adolf Hitler and could hold 14,000 people. During the Allied bombings of Mannheim and Ludwigshafen am Rhein during World War II, the stadium was completely damaged, and a new stadium had to be built. In 1946, the new foundations for the stadium were constructed and, on November 11, 1950, the stadium was inaugurated. At that time, it was considered to be one of West Germany’s most modern stadiums and several important West German matches were held at the stadium. When it was announced that West Germany would host the 1974 World Championship Football match, the city of Ludwigshafen applied to the organization committee as a candidate venue. The committee finally favored Frankfurt’s Waldstadion instead of the Südweststadion.

Between 1983 and 1989, SV Waldhof Mannheim played its Bundesliga matches in the Südweststadion. After that, the stadium fell into disrepair. In 2007, the stadium was partially renovated.

=== Concerts ===
During the ‘80s, the stadium hosted several concerts of Elton John, Peter Maffay, Metallica, Iron Maiden, Eros Ramazzotti, Bon Jovi, Herbert Grönemeyer and Bruce Springsteen. On August 30, 1992, Michael Jackson made a stop at the stadium as part of his Dangerous World Tour.

== Regular tenants ==
=== FC Arminia 03 ===
The football club FC Arminia 03 Ludwigshafen played most of its matches from 1952 to 1979 in the stadium. In 1979, the club moved to another location. Since 2013, the club has played in the stadium occasionally.

=== SV Waldhof Mannheim ===
When SV Waldhof Mannheim was promoted to the Bundesliga in 1983, the club played from 1983 to 1989 in the stadium, as their own venue didn't meet the high security demands from the DFB. The club from neighboring city Mannheim played 102 matches in the stadium and moved back to their old venue in 1989, when the club was relegated from the Bundesliga.

=== FSV Oggersheim ===
In 2005, FSV Oggersheim began using the stadium. After its promotion to the Regionalliga in 2007, the stadium was partially renovated. The Municipality of Ludwigshafen invested €1,5 million to modernize the stadium. A large part of the stadium was closed due to security reasons. FSV Oggersheim left the stadium in 2009.

=== 1. FC Kaiserslautern ===
Due to the stadium's large capacity, 1. FC Kaiserslautern played several home matches there during the '50s and '60s. In 1978/79 1. FC Kaiserslautern played their first two matches in the stadium when their Fritz-Walter-Stadion was redeveloped.

== Important matches ==
=== Final West German championship ===
In 1952, the stadium hosted the first final match of the West German championship.

- 22 juni 1952: VfB Stuttgart – 1. FC Saarbrücken 3:2

=== West German Cup Finals ===
The same hosted the DFB Pokal finals:

- 17 April 1954: VfB Stuttgart – 1. FC Köln 1:0
- 9 June 1968: 1. FC Köln – VfL Bochum 4:1

=== International matches ===
The West German national team played four friendly matches in the stadium.

№	Date	Match	Result	Spectators
1.	21 December 1952	Germany – Yugoslavia	3–2	70,000
2.	27 April 1960	Germany – Portugal	2–1	41,383
3.	29 April 1964	Germany – Czechoslovakia	3–4	41,383
4.	1 June 1966	Germany – Romania	1–0	41,383
