= Erich Bäumler =

German footballer and manager

Personal information
- Date of birth: 6 January 1930
- Place of birth: Weiden in der Oberpfalz, Germany
- Date of death: 18 September 2003 (aged 73)
- Place of death: Rüsselsheim, Germany
- Position: Striker

Senior career*
Years	Team	Apps	(Gls)
1945–1954	SpVgg Weiden		
1954–1960	Eintracht Frankfurt	110	(41)
1960–1962	FSV Mainz 05		
1962–1965	SC Opel Rüsselsheim		

International career
1956	Germany	1	(1)

Managerial career
- SC Opel Rüsselsheim
- 1967–1968: Mainz 05
- SG 01 Hoechst
- SG Egelsbach
- VfR Groß-Gerau
- SG Kelkheim
- * Club domestic league appearances and goals

Erich Bäumler (6 January 1930 – 18 September 2003) was a German footballer.

== Career ==
Bäumler earned his first and only cap for Germany on 13 June 1956 in a friendly match against Norway, which finished with a 3–1 win.

He died on 18 September 2003.

== Honours ==
- German championship: 1958–59
- European Cup: runners-up 1959–60
- Oberliga Süd: 1958–59
