= Wolfgang Solz =

German footballer (1940–2017)

Personal information
- Date of birth: 12 February 1940
- Place of birth: Frankfurt, Germany
- Date of death: 24 March 2017 (aged 77)
- Position: Winger

Youth career
- 1949–1958: Union Niederrad
- 1958–1959: Eintracht Frankfurt

Senior career*
Years	Team	Apps	(Gls)
1959–1968	Eintracht Frankfurt	182	(63)
1968–1971	Darmstadt 98		
1971–1974	SpVgg Bad Homburg		
1974–1975	SpVgg Neu-Isenburg		

International career
1962–1964	West Germany	2	(0)

Managerial career
- 1970–1971: Darmstadt 98 (player-manager)
- * Club domestic league appearances and goals

Wolfgang Solz (12 February 1940 – 24 March 2017) was a German professional footballer who played as a winger.

== Club career ==
=== Eintracht Frankfurt ===
The youth internationalist moved from Union Niederrad to Eintracht Frankfurt in 1958. The first season he had to spend in the youth team due to transfer regulations. From the 1959–60 campaign on, Solz was an Oberliga team member. On 6 December 1959, he debuted as left winger against SSV Reutlingen. For the European Cup final match in Glasgow against Real Madrid on 18 May 1960 he was benched. Because of his excellent technique he was called "Brasilianer", Brazilian. From 1959 until 1963 he appeared in 69 Oberliga matches, netting 17 goals and contributed to the runner-up titles in 1961 and 1962 in the Oberliga Süd. In the 1963 founded Bundesliga he gathered 46 goals in 113 matches. In the Inter-Cities Fairs Cup, Solz experienced international flair in 1964–65 and 1966–67. His last Bundesliga appearance was a 0–0 draw at Schalke 04 on 25 May 1968.

=== Darmstadt 98 ===
After his departure from Eintracht Frankfurt, Solz signed at Darmstadt 98 where he stayed from 1968 until 1971. The first two rounds in the Regionalliga Süd as a player Spieler, the 1970–71 season as a player-manager in the amateur league Hessen. He won the championship with the Lilies, leading them back to the Regionalliga.

=== SpVgg Bad Homburg ===
As 33-year-old player-manager, Solz won the German amateur championship with SpVgg Bad Homburg against the 1. FC Kaiserslautern amateurs on 30 June 1973.

== International career ==
Solz gained his first cap in the pre-Bundesliga time. On 24 October 1962, the winger played together with the ones of Uwe Seeler, Heinz Strehl and Friedhelm Konietzka in Stuttgart against France when the match ended 2–2. After 1962 FIFA World Cup in Chile, Bundestrainer Sepp Herberger had to re-build the team and the 22-year-old Frankfurt native received the chance to play for Germany. His second match for the national team was on 29 April 1964 in Ludwigshafen at the 4–3 loss against Czechoslovakia. He formed the left wing together with Wolfgang Overath but was not capped again. In acceleration he was not an excessively pacy winger and on the playmaker position Helmut Haller, Wolfgang Overath and Günter Netzer could not be pushed away.

== Managerial career ==
After eleven honours won in the amateur tiers, he retired his manager career FSV Frankfurt in 1989. He had a reputation as a sound manager and had some success with Viktoria Aschaffenburg, VfR Bürstadt, FC Erbach, RW Frankfurt, Borussia Fulda und Hanau 93.

== Later life ==
The former bureau employee founded an insurance agency in Frankfurt.

== Honours ==
- European Cup: runners-up 1959–60
- Oberliga Süd: runners-up 1960–61, 1961–62
- DFB-Pokal: runners-up 1963–64
- UEFA Intertoto Cup: 1966–67
