= Alfred Pfaff =

German footballer

Personal information
- Full name: Alfred Pfaff
- Date of birth: 16 July 1926
- Place of birth: Rödelheim, Frankfurt, Germany
- Date of death: 27 December 2008 (aged 82)
- Place of death: Erlenbach am Main, Germany
- Position: Midfielder

Youth career
- 1936–: Eintracht Frankfurt

Senior career*
| Years | Team | Apps | (Gls) |
- SC Wirges
- 1. FC Hochstadt
| 1947–1949 | 1. Rödelheimer FC 02 | | |
| 1949–1961 | Eintracht Frankfurt | 301 | (103) |

International career
| 1953–1956 | West Germany | 7 | (2) |
Medal record
Representing West Germany
FIFA World Cup
| Winner | 1954 Switzerland |
- * Club domestic league appearances and goals

Alfred Pfaff (16 July 1926 – 27 December 2008) was a German football player and World Cup winner with West Germany in 1954.

== Life ==
Pfaff was capped seven times between 1953 and 1956 for the West Germany national team, scoring two goals as an inside forward.

The highlight of his career was winning the 1954 World Cup in Switzerland. Pfaff had an appearance in the preliminary round against Hungary (3–8) and scored a goal in the 26th minute.

His club was Eintracht Frankfurt with whom he won the 1959 German Championship, and in 1960 reached the final of the Champions' Cup against Real Madrid. The left-footed Don Alfredo was the head of the team. Pfaff was a true playmaker with exceptionally good ball control and great skills at free kicks. Pfaff probably would have accumulated more than seven caps if Fritz Walter had not played the same role for West Germany as Pfaff played for Eintracht Frankfurt. In 1954, Atlético Madrid offered him 180,000 D-Mark but his wife Edith was against a move to Spain. Possibly Pfaff's greatest game was the 6–1 against Rangers in the 1959–60 semifinal first leg of the European Cup, which was followed by a 6–3 win of Eintracht Frankfurt in Glasgow in the second leg. He ended his career in 1962 at the age of 36.

Besides his sports career, Pfaff was an innkeeper and had a bar near the Hauptwache in Frankfurt. Since the 1960s, he lived as a barkeeper and hotel keeper in Zittenfelden in Morretal, Odenwald.

== Honours ==
Eintracht Frankfurt

- German championship: 1958–59
- European Cup: runners-up 1959–60
- Oberliga Süd: 1952–53, 1958–59; runners-up 1953–54, 1960–61

West Germany

- FIFA World Cup: 1954
