= Erich Meier =

German footballer (1935–2010)

Personal information
- Date of birth: 30 March 1935
- Place of birth: Biedenkopf, Germany
- Date of death: 8 February 2010 (aged 74)
- Place of death: Biedenkopf-Wallau, Germany
- Position: Left winger

Youth career
- –1956: FV 09 Breidenbach

Senior career*
Years	Team	Apps	(Gls)
1956–1962	Eintracht Frankfurt	43	(17)
1962–1965	1. FC Kaiserslautern	53	(33)
1965–1966	Alkmaar '54		(2)
1966	AGOVV Apeldoorn		(11)
- * Club domestic league appearances and goals

Erich Meier (30 March 1935 – 8 February 2010) was a German footballer who played as a winger. With Eintracht Frankfurt, Meier won the German championship in 1959 and reached the 1960 European Cup Final against Real Madrid. In his main profession he was a construction technician.

== Career ==
Meier started his career with amateur side FV 09 Breidenbach, and moved to Frankfurt in 1956. Erich Meier had his highlights in the matches of the European Cup 1959–60, as he scored four goals in six fixtures. Thus his nickname is originated, Flood light Meier. Arguably his two most remembered appearances include the final match at Glasgow's Hampden Park and the second leg of the semi-final at Rangers, when he contributed two goals to the 6–3 victory.

In the Oberliga he was overshadowed by Lothar Schämer, so he moved to 1. FC Kaiserslautern in 1962. After that, he moved to the Netherlands, where he played for Alkmaar '54 and AGOVV Apeldoorn, where he ended his career at the end of the 1965–66 season.
