= Dieter Lindner (footballer) =

German footballer (1939–2024)

Personal information
- Date of birth: 11 June 1939
- Place of birth: Breslau, Gau Silesia, Germany
- Date of death: 22 December 2024 (aged 85)
- Position: Midfielder

Youth career
- –1956: Eintracht Frankfurt

Senior career*
Years	Team	Apps	(Gls)
1956–1971	Eintracht Frankfurt	321	(54)
- * Club domestic league appearances and goals

Dieter Lindner (11 June 1939 – 22 December 2024) was a German footballer who played as a midfielder for Eintracht Frankfurt, later becoming vice-president.

== Career ==
After winning the 1959 German football championship, Lindner played with Eintracht Frankfurt in the 1960 European Cup final against Real Madrid which the Spaniards won 7–3.

In the 1980–81 season Lindner was appointed vice-president of Eintracht Frankfurt. From 5 May to 2 October 1996 he was interim president of the club.

== Death ==
Lindner died on 22 December 2024, at the age of 85.
