= 1965–66 TSV 1860 Munich season =

TSV 1860 Munich
1965–66 season
- Manager: Max Merkel
- Stadium: Grünwalder Stadion
- Bundesliga: 1st
- DFB-Pokal: 1st round
- Top goalscorer: League: Friedhelm Konietzka (26); All: Friedhelm Konietzka (33)

The 1965–66 TSV 1860 Munich season was the third season since the foundation of the Bundesliga in 1963. This season, 1860 München won the Bundesliga title. The club was eliminated in the first round of the DFB-Pokal by SV Werder Bremen and in the quarterfinals of the Inter-Cities Fairs Cup by Chelsea F.C. The top goal scorer this season was Friedhelm Konietzka who scored 26 goals in the Bundesliga and 33 goals overall. Željko Perušić, Ludwig Bründl, Alfred Kohlhäufl, Helmut Richert and Konietzka joined the club this season. Stevan Bena, Engelbert Kraus and Alfred Pyka left the club this season.

== Match results ==
=== Legend ===
Win Draw Loss

=== Bundesliga ===
==== League fixtures and results ====
MD	Date	KO^{1}	Stadium	City	Opponent	Result^{2}	Attendance	Goalscorers		Table		Ref.
MD	Date	KO^{1}	Stadium	City	Opponent	Result^{2}	Attendance	1860 München	Opponent	Pos.	Pts	Ref.
1	14 Aug.	16:00	H	Munich	Bayern Munich	1–0	44,000	Konietzka 1'	—	T4	2	
2	21 Aug.	16:00	A	Nuremberg	1. FC Nürnberg	4–1	62,000	Brunnenmeier 1' (pen.), 30', 38'; Konietzka 58'	Reisch 16' (pen.)	2	4	
3	28 Aug.	16:00	H	Munich	Hannover 96	5–0	40,000	Konietzka 14', 57', 60'; Brunnenmeier 68'; Grosser 71'	—	1	6	
4	4 Sep.	16:00	A	Kaiserslautern	1. FC K'lautern	0–3	35,000	—	Rummel 12', 34', 86'	3	6	
5	11 Sep.	16:00	H	Munich	VfB Stuttgart	0–0	35,000	—	—	4	7	
6	18 Sep.	16:00	A	Duisburg	Meidericher SV	3–2	35,000	Konietzka 4'; Grosser 46' (pen.), 80'	Lotz 54'; Krämer 63'	4	9	
7	2 Oct.	16:00	H	Munich	1. FC Köln	2–1	44,000	Rebele 25'; Grosser 76'	Löhr 59'	2	11	
8	16 Oct.	16:00	A	Bremen	Werder Bremen	2–0	48,000	Grosser 73' (pen.); Rebele 87'	—	1	13	
9	20 Oct.	20:00	H	Munich	Schalke 04	3–0	35,000	Brunnenmeier 20'; Heiß 63'; Konietzka 76'	—	1	15	
10	23 Oct.	16:00	H	Munich	Eintracht Frankfurt	4–2	30,000	Konietzka 10', 74'; Grosser 63' (pen.), 88'	Huberts 22'; Grabowski 87'	1	17	
11	30 Oct.	16:00	A	Braunschweig	Eintracht B'weig	2–2	28,000	Brunnenmeier 4', 18'	Ulsaß 67' (pen.)	1	18	
12	6 Nov.	15:00	H	Munich	Borussia Neunkirchen	4–1	24,000	Konietzka 12', 56'; Heiß 38', 88'	Simmet 77'	1	20	
13	20 Nov.	14:30	A	Berlin	Tasmania 1900	5–0	10,000	Konietzka 18', 35'; Brunnenmeier 73'; Grosser 81'; Heiß 85'	—	1	22	
14	27 Nov.	15:00	H	Munich	Karlsruher SC	2–0	19,000	Luttrop 19'; Konietzka 59'	—	1	24	
16	11 Dec.	15:00	H	Munich	Borussia Dortmund	2–1	42,000	Heiß 29'; Rebele 79'	Emmerich 72' (pen.)	1	26	
17	18 Dec.	15:00	A	Hamburg	Hamburger SV	2–1	22,000	Brunnenmeier 66'; Grosser 79'	Dörfel 72'	1	28	
15	29 Sep.	14:00	A	Mönchengladbach	Borussia M'gladbach	1–1	38,000	Konietzka 30'	Rupp 80'	1	29	
18	8 Jan.	15:00	A	Munich	Bayern Munich	0–3	40,000	—	Brenninger 59'; Ohlhauser 76'; Nafziger 84'	1	29	
19	15 Jan.	15:00	H	Munich	1. FC Nürnberg	1–1	37,000	Grosser 62'	Greif 39'	1	30	
20	29 Jan.	15:00	A	Hanover	Hannover 96	1–0	45,000	Brunnenmeier 70'	—	1	32	
22	12 Feb.	15:00	A	Stuttgart	VfB Stuttgart	0–0	50,000	—	—	3	33	
23	26 Feb.	15:00	H	Munich	Meidericher SV	3–3	23,000	Brunnenmeier 51', 61'; Konietzka 52'	Tagliari 11'; Gecks 25', 76'	2	34	
24	5 Mar.	16:00	A	Cologne	1. FC Köln	1–3	56,000	Küppers 84'	Müller 14'; Krauthausen 40'; Löhr 55'	3	34	
25	12 Mar.	16:00	H	Munich	Werder Bremen	3–1	28,000	Brunnenmeier 14'; Konietzka 29', 80'	Hänel 2'	2	36	
26	19 Mar.	16:00	A	Gelsenkirchen	Schalke 04	2–0	35,000	Heiß 39'; Konietzka 77'	—	2	38	
27	26 Mar.	16:00	A	Frankfurt	Eintracht Frankfurt	2–5	44,000	Küppers 22'; Konietzka 77'	Trimhold 21', 78', 81'; Sztáni 35'; Huberts 45' (pen.)	3	38	
28	2 Apr.	16:00	H	Munich	Eintracht B'weig	1–1	18,000	Grosser 16'	Maas 47'	3	39	
21	12 Apr.	20:00	H	Munich	1. FC K'lautern	4–2	25,000	Grosser 7', 88'; Konietzka 23', 48'	Rummel 70'; Neumann 83'	3	41	
29	16 Apr.	16:00	A	Neunkirchen	Borussia Neunkirchen	9–1	20,000	Grosser 17', 52'; Konietzka 34'; Heiß 35', 44', 70', 77'; Küppers 61'; Rebele 67'	Kuntz 56'	3	43	
30	23 Apr.	16:00	H	Munich	Tasmania 1900	4–0	23,000	Konietzka 35'; Rebele 49'; Grosser 57'; Linder 87' (o.g.)	—	3	45	
31	30 Apr.	16:00	A	Karlsruhe	Karlsruher SC	1–1	50,000	Grosser 53'	Kentschke 19'	2	46	
32	14 May	16:00	H	Munich	Borussia M'gladbach	3–3	22,000	Konietzka 36', 49'; Küppers 45'	Laumen 25', 82', 83'	2	47	
33	21 May	16:00	A	Dortmund	Borussia Dortmund	2–0	35,000	Brunnenmeier 66'; Grosser 89'	—	1	49	
34	28 May	16:00	H	Munich	Hamburger SV	1–1	44,000	Brunnenmeier 6'	Seeler 75'	1	50	

==== League standings ====
Pos	Team	Pld	W	D	L	GF	GA	GR	Pts	Qualification or relegation
1	1860 Munich (C)	34	20	10	4	80	40	2.000	50	Qualification to European Cup first round
2	Borussia Dortmund	34	19	9	6	70	36	1.944	47	Qualification to Cup Winners' Cup second round (Note: Borussia Dortmund won the 1965–66 European Cup Winners' Cup and thereby automatically qualified as defending champions.)
3	Bayern Munich	34	20	7	7	71	38	1.868	47	Qualification to Cup Winners' Cup first round
4	Werder Bremen	34	21	3	10	76	40	1.900	45	
5	1. FC Köln	34	19	6	9	74	41	1.805	44	

Rules for classification: 1) points; 2) goal ratio.
(C) Champions

=== DFB-Pokal ===
Round	Date	Stadium	City	Opponent	Result^{2}	Attendance	Goalscorers		Source
Round	Date	Stadium	City	Opponent	Result^{2}	Attendance	1860 München	Opponent	Source
R1	22 Jan.	A	Bremen	Werder Bremen	0–4	15,000	—	Dausmann 56', 82'; Zebrowski 86'; Schütz 89'	

=== Inter-Cities Fairs Cup ===
Leg	Date	KO^{1}	Stadium	City	Opponent	Result^{2}	Agg. score^{2}	Goalscorers		Source
Leg	Date	KO^{1}	Stadium	City	Opponent	Result^{2}	Agg. score^{2}	1860 München	Opponent	Source
First round
1	15 Sep.	17:00	A	Malmö	Malmö FF (Sweden)	3–0	—	Heiß 23'; Rebele 27'; Grosser 64'	—	
2	27 Sep.	22:00	H	Munich	Malmö FF (Sweden)	4–0	7–0	Brunnenmeier 7'; Heiß 24'; Grosser 58'; Rebele 88'	—	
Second round
1	2 Nov.	22:00	A	İzmir	Göztepe S.K. (Turkey)	1–2	—	Brunnenmeier 72'	Karakayah 63'; Öznur 70'	
2	23 Nov.	22:00	H	Munich	Göztepe S.K. (Turkey)	9–1	10–3	Rebele 1', 29', 58'; Konietzka 5', 36', 44', 65'; Radenković 73' (pen.); Heiß 87'	Öznur 6'	
Third round
1	7 Feb.	22:00	A	Geneva	Servette FC (Switzerland)	1–1	—	Konietzka 39'	Daina 89'	
2	14 Feb.	22:00	H	Munich	Servette FC (Switzerland)	4–1	5–2	Konietzka 16'; Grosser 35'; Brunnenmeier 58', 87'	Georgy 40'	
Quarterfinals
1	14 Mar.	22:00	H	Munich	Chelsea (England)	2–2	—	Kohlars 17'; Konietzka 75'	Tambling 36', 55'	
2	28 Mar.	22:00	A	London	Chelsea (England)	0–1	2–3	—	Osgood 78'	

== Player information ==
=== Squad and statistics ===
==== Appearances and goals ====
Player	Total		Bundesliga		DFB-Pokal		Inter-Cities Fairs Cup	
Player	Apps	Goals	Apps	Goals	Apps	Goals	Apps	Goals
Goalkeepers
Petar Radenković	43	1	34	0	1	0	8	1
Wilfried Tepe	0	0	0	0	0	0	0	0
Defenders
Bernd Patzke	36	0	28	0	1	0	7	0
Hans Reich	32	0	26	0	0	0	6	0
Manfred Wagner	32	0	26	0	1	0	5	0
Rudolf Zeiser	14	0	12	0	0	0	2	0
Rudolf Steiner	11	0	9	0	0	0	2	0
Alfred Kohlhäufl	0	0	0	0	0	0	0	0
Midfielders
Željko Perušić	43	0	34	0	1	0	8	0
Peter Grosser	41	21	32	18	1	0	8	3
Otto Luttrop	27	1	22	1	1	0	4	0
Wilfried Kohlars	27	1	19	0	1	0	7	1
Hans Küppers	26	4	19	4	1	0	6	0
Forwards
Friedhelm Konietzka	42	33	33	26	1	0	8	7
Alfred Heiß	38	13	31	10	1	0	6	3
Rudolf Brunnenmeier	33	19	27	15	1	0	5	4
Hans Rebele	28	10	22	5	0	0	6	5
Ludwig Bründl	0	0	0	0	0	0	0	0
Hans Fischer	0	0	0	0	0	0	0	0
Helmut Richert	0	0	0	0	0	0	0	0
Ernst Winterhalder	0	0	0	0	0	0	0	0

=== Transfers ===
==== In ====
Pos.	Name	Age	Moving from	Sources
MF	Željko Perušić	28	GNK Dinamo Zagreb	
FW	Ludwig Bründl	18	Unknown	
MF	Alfred Kohlhäufl	18	SpVgg Plattling	
FW	Friedhelm Konietzka	26	Borussia Dortmund	
FW	Helmut Richert	23	Unknown	

==== Out ====
Pos.	Name	Age	Moving to	Sources
DF	Stevan Bena	28	Hannover 96	
FW	Engelbert Kraus	30	Kickers Offenbach	
MF	Alfred Pyka	31	FC Schalke 04	

== Notes ==
- 1.Kickoff time in Central European Time.
- 2.1860 München goals listed first.
