= TSV 1860 Munich in European football =

- Club: TSV 1860 Munich
- Seasons played: 11
- Most appearances: Petar Radenković (26)
- Top scorer: Timo Konietzka (11)
- First entry: 1964–65 European Cup Winners' Cup
- Latest entry: 2002 UEFA Intertoto Cup

TSV 1860 Munich is a German professional football club based in Munich, the capital city of Bavaria. One of the oldest clubs in Germany, it has participated in European competitions in a total of eleven seasons in its history. The club's first participation, which came in the 1964–65 European Cup Winners' Cup, saw them reach the final. Since then, the club has taken part in all of the recognised major competitions, including twice qualifying for the European Cup / Champions League.

== History ==
=== 1964–65 European Cup Winners' Cup ===
Following their victory in the 1964 DFB-Pokal final against Eintracht Frankfurt, 1860 Munich made their first foray into European competition in the 1964–65 European Cup Winners' Cup.This proved successful, as the club was able to negotiate ties against opposition from Luxembourg, Portugal, Poland and Italy to reach the final, where they played English side West Ham United. Ultimately, 1860 Munich fell just short, losing the final 2–0.

Round	Opposition	Home	Away	Aggregate
First round	US Luxembourg	6–0	4–0	10–0
Second round	(Portugal) Porto	1–1	1–0	2–1
Quarter-final	(Poland) Legia Warsaw	0–0	4–0	4–0
Semi-final	(Italy) Torino	3–1	0–2	3–3
Semi-final play-off	(Italy) Torino	2–0		
Final	(England) West Ham United	0–2		

=== 1965–66 Inter-Cities Fairs Cup ===
1860 Munich qualified for Europe for a second successive season by virtue of their fourth place finish in the 1964–65 Bundesliga, which gave them a place in the first round of the 1965–66 Inter-Cities Fairs Cup. As with the previous season, they made relatively straightforward progress through the rounds, but fell again to an English side, this time Chelsea in the quarter-final.

Round	Opposition	Home	Away	Aggregate
First round	(Sweden) Malmö FF	4–0	3–0	7–0
Second round	(Turkey) Göztepe	9–1	1–2	10–3
Third round	(Switzerland) Servette	4–1	1–1	5–2
Quarter-final	(England) Chelsea	2–2	0–1	2–3

=== 1966–67 European Cup ===
1860 Munich's third successive European season came as a result of winning the league title in the 1965–66 Bundesliga, which gave them qualification for the European Cup for the first time. The club made it to the second round where they were eliminated by reigning champions Real Madrid.

Round	Opposition	Home	Away	Aggregate
First round	(Cyprus) Omonia	8–0	2–1	10–1
Second round	(Spain) Real Madrid	1–0	1–3	2–3

=== 1967–68 Inter-Cities Fairs Cup ===
Having finished second in the 1966–67 Bundesliga, 1860 Munich qualified for Europe once again, returning to the Inter-Cities Fairs Cup, reaching the second round where they were eliminated by English side Liverpool.

Round	Opposition	Home	Away	Aggregate
First round	(Switzerland) Servette	4–0	2–2	6–2
Second round	(England) Liverpool	2–1	0–8	2–9

=== 1968–69 Inter-Cities Fairs Cup ===
1860 Munich played their fifth successive European campaign in the 1968–69 Inter-Cities Fairs Cup. However, qualification was obtained through a 12th place finish in the 1967–68 Bundesliga, an indication of the club's slide from the heights it enjoyed a few years earlier. Playing Legia Warsaw of Poland, they failed to get past the opening round, the first time that 1860 Munich had failed to win its opening European tie.

Round	Opposition	Home	Away	Aggregate
First round	(Poland) Legia Warsaw	2–3	0–6	2–9

=== 1969–70 Inter-Cities Fairs Cup ===
The 1969–70 Inter-Cities Fairs Cup was the last of 1860 Munich's six successive European campaigns during the 1960s. The club's 10th place finish in the 1968–69 Bundesliga gave them their place in the competition, but for the second successive season they failed to get past the opening round. Following their elimination, 1860 Munich would not return to European competition for 27 years.

Round	Opposition	Home	Away	Aggregate
First round	(Norway) Skeid	2–2	1–2	3–4

=== 1996 UEFA Intertoto Cup ===
Following their success during the 1960s, 1860 Munich suffered a significant decline, entering a period after 1970 of regular promotion and relegation to and from the Bundesliga, which led to them descending as far as the amateur Amateur-Oberliga Bayern during the 1980s. The club made its first return to the Bundesliga for a decade and a half in 1994, finishing 14th in their first season back in the top flight of German football. The following season improved, with an 8th place finish seeing them qualify for the 1996 UEFA Intertoto Cup, the first time the club had qualified for European football of any kind since 1969. Drawn in Group 8 against teams from Russia, the Czech Republic, Bulgaria and Poland, 1860 Munich finished second, missing out on the competition's semi-finals.

Round	Opposition	Home	Away	Aggregate
Group 8	(Bulgaria) Spartak Varna	—N/a	1–2	2nd
Group 8	(Poland) ŁKS Łódź	5–0	—N/a	2nd
Group 8	(Czech Republic) Kaučuk Opava	—N/a	2–0	2nd
Group 8	(Russia) KAMAZ-Chally Naberezhnye Chelny	0–1	—N/a	2nd

=== 1997–98 UEFA Cup ===
The 1996–97 Bundesliga saw two-thirds of its participants qualify for Europe in one form or another, with both Borussia Dortmund and Schalke having won European trophies that season. Borussia Dortmund's victory in the Champions League saw them go into the following season's competition, meaning their place in the 1997–98 UEFA Cup for finishing third in the league passed down the league table. Similarly, fourth-placed VfB Stuttgart won the 1997 DFB-Pokal final, and went into the Cup Winners' Cup, leading to another UEFA Cup spot passing down the league table. This led to seventh-placed 1860 Munich, who had originally qualified for the Intertoto Cup, instead finding themselves with a spot in the UEFA Cup. They were ultimately eliminated in the second round by Austrian side Rapid Wien.

Round	Opposition	Home	Away	Aggregate
First round	(Finland) Jazz	6–1	1–0	7–1
Second round	(Austria) Rapid Wien	2–1	0–3	2–4

=== 2000–01 UEFA Champions League ===
In the 1999–2000 Bundesliga, 1860 Munich came 4th, the club's highest league finish since 1967, which also gave them a place in the 2000–01 UEFA Champions League. This was their first time in Europe's top club competition since they won the Bundesliga title in 1966, and saw them enter at the third qualifying round stage, where they were beaten by English side Leeds United. The format of the competition meant that losers at that stage would drop into the UEFA Cup.

Round	Opposition	Home	Away	Aggregate
Third qualifying round	(England) Leeds United	0–1	1–2	1–3

=== 2000–01 UEFA Cup ===
Following elimination from the Champions League, 1860 Munich dropped into the UEFA Cup. Ultimately reaching the third round, the club were eventually eliminated by Italian side Parma.

Round	Opposition	Home	Away	Aggregate
First round	(Czech Republic) Drnovice	1–0	0–0	1–0
Second round	(Sweden) Halmstads	3–1	2–3	5–4
Third round	(Italy) Parma	0–2	2–2	2–4

=== 2001 UEFA Intertoto Cup ===
An 11th place finish in the 2000–01 Bundesliga led to a return to the UEFA Intertoto Cup for 1860 Munich, entering in the second round of the 2001 competition. Reaching the semi-final, they were eventually eliminated by Newcastle United.

Round	Opposition	Home	Away	Aggregate
Second round	(Federal Republic of Yugoslavia) Sartid	3–1	3–2	6–3
Third round	(Netherlands) RKC Waalwijk	3–1	2–1	5–2
Semi-final	(England) Newcastle United	2–3	1–3	3–6

=== 2002 UEFA Intertoto Cup ===
With a 9th place finish in the 2001–02 Bundesliga, 1860 Munich qualified for a second successive Intertoto Cup, again entering in the second round, where they were eliminated by BATE Borisov of Belarus.

Round	Opposition	Home	Away	Aggregate
Second round	(Belarus) BATE Borisov	0–1	0–4	0–5

== Overall record ==
Correct as of match played 14 July 2002 vs BATE Borisov

=== Record by competition ===
Competition	Pld	W	D	L	GF	GA	GD	Best performance
European Cup / UEFA Champions League	6	3	0	3	13	7	+6	Second round (1966–67)
European Cup Winners' Cup	10	6	2	2	21	6	+15	Runners-up (1964–65)
UEFA Cup	10	6	2	2	17	13	+4	Third round (2000–01)
Inter-Cities Fairs Cup	16	6	4	6	37	32	+5	Quarter-final (1965–66)
UEFA Intertoto Cup	12	6	0	6	22	19	+3	Semi-final (2001)
Total	54	27	8	19	110	77	+33	

=== Record by nation ===
Nation	Pld	W	D	L	GF	GA	GD	Opponents
Austria	2	1	0	1	2	4	-2	Rapid Wien
Belarus	2	0	0	2	0	5	-5	BATE Borisov
Bulgaria	1	0	0	1	1	2	-1	Spartak Varna
Cyprus	2	2	0	0	10	1	+9	Omonia
Czech Republic	3	2	1	0	3	0	+3	Drnovice, Kaučuk Opava
England	9	1	1	7	8	23	-15	Chelsea, Leeds United, Liverpool, Newcastle United, West Ham United
Finland	2	2	0	0	7	1	+6	Jazz
Italy	5	2	1	2	7	7	0	Parma, Torino
Luxembourg	2	2	0	0	10	0	+10	US Luxembourg
Netherlands	2	2	0	0	5	2	+3	RKC Waalwijk
Norway	2	0	1	1	3	4	-1	Skeid
Poland	5	2	1	2	11	9	+2	Legia Warsaw, ŁKS Łódź
Portugal	2	1	1	0	2	1	+1	Porto
Russia	1	0	0	1	0	1	-1	KAMAZ-Chally Naberezhnye Chelny
Spain	2	1	0	1	2	3	-1	Real Madrid
Switzerland	4	2	2	0	11	4	+7	Servette
Sweden	4	4	0	0	12	4	+8	Halmstads, Malmö FF
Turkey	2	1	0	1	10	3	+7	Göztepe
FR Yugoslavia	2	2	0	0	6	3	+3	Sartid

=== European Finals ===
Year	Competition	Opposition	Score	Venue
1965	Cup Winners' Cup	(England) West Ham United	0–2	(England) Wembley Stadium, London

== All-time goalscorers in major competitions ==
The following is a list of 1860 Munich's goalscorers in major competitions:

Rank	Player	ECWC	ICFC	EC / UCL	UIC	UEFA	Total
1	(Germany) Timo Konietzka	0	7	4	0	0	11
2	(Germany) Rudolf Brunnenmeier	4	4	2	0	0	10
=3	(Germany) Alfred Heiß	5	3	0	0	0	8
=3	(Germany) Hans Rebele	3	5	0	0	0	8
=3	(Germany) Martin Max	0	0	0	5	3	8
=6	(Germany) Peter Grosser	2	5	0	0	0	7
=6	(Germany) Hans Küppers	2	2	3	0	0	7
8	(Germany) Wilfried Kohlars	0	3	3	0	0	6
=10	(Germany) Otto Luttrop	5	0	0	0	0	5
=10	(Germany) Olaf Bodden	0	0	0	5	0	5
12	(Austria) Harald Cerny	0	0	0	2	2	4
=13	(Germany) Bernhard Winkler	0	0	0	0	3	3
=13	(Australia) Paul Agostino	0	0	1	1	1	3
=13	(Germany) Thomas Häßler	0	0	0	2	1	3
=16	(Germany) Klaus Fischer	0	2	0	0	0	2
=16	(Poland) Piotr Nowak	0	0	0	1	1	2
=18	(Socialist Federal Republic of Yugoslavia) Petar Radenkovic	0	1	0	0	0	1
=18	(Germany) Ludwig Brundl	0	1	0	0	0	1
=18	(Germany) Gottfried Peter	0	1	0	0	0	1
=18	(Germany) Bernd Patzke	0	1	0	0	0	1
=18	(Germany) Jürgen Schütz	0	1	0	0	0	1
=18	(Germany) Ferdinand Keller	0	1	0	0	0	1
=18	(Germany) Jörg Böhme	0	0	0	0	1	1
=18	(Bulgaria) Daniel Borimirov	0	0	0	0	1	1
=18	(Germany) Matthias Hamann	0	0	0	0	1	1
=18	(Ghana) Abedi Pele	0	0	0	0	1	1
=18	(Germany) Markus Beierle	0	0	0	0	1	1
=18	(Germany) Marco Kurz	0	0	0	0	1	1
=18	(Czech Republic) Roman Tyce	0	0	0	0	1	1
=18	(Cameroon) Samuel Ipoua	0	0	0	1	0	1
=18	(Norway) Vidar Riseth	0	0	0	1	0	1
=18	(Germany) Markus Schroth	0	0	0	1	0	1
=18	(Croatia) Filip Tapalovic	0	0	0	1	0	1
=18	(Germany) Michael Wiesinger	0	0	0	1	0	1

== Other competitions ==
=== 1967 Cup of the Alps ===
Round	Opposition	Home	Away	Aggregate
Group stage	(Italy) Torino	0–0	—N/a	2nd
Group stage	(Italy) Roma	4–3	—N/a	2nd
Group stage	(Italy) Milan	0–0	—N/a	2nd
Group stage	(Switzerland) Basel	—N/a	4–4	2nd
Group stage	(Switzerland) Servette	—N/a	4–1	2nd

=== 1968 Intertoto Cup ===
Round	Opposition	Home	Away	Aggregate
Group A5	(Spain) Español	2–1	0–2	2nd
Group A5	Austria Wien	2–1	2–1	2nd
