= 1965 European Cup Winners' Cup final =

- Match programme cover
- Event: 1964–65 European Cup Winners' Cup
1860 Munich	West Ham United
(West Germany)	(England)
0	2
- Date: 19 May 1965
- Venue: Wembley Stadium, London
- Referee: István Zsolt (Hungary)
- Attendance: 97,974

The 1965 European Cup Winners' Cup Final was a football match between 1860 Munich of West Germany and West Ham United of England. The final was held at Wembley Stadium in London on 19 May 1965. It was the final match of the 1964–65 European Cup Winners' Cup and the fifth European Cup Winners' Cup final since the competition's inception.

== Route to the final ==
(West Germany) 1860 Munich					(England) West Ham United				
Opponent	Agg.	1st leg	2nd leg	Replay		Opponent	Agg.	1st leg	2nd leg
Union Luxembourg	10–0	4–0 (A)	6–0 (H)		First round	(Belgium) Gent	2–1	1–0 (A)	1–1 (H)
(Portugal) Porto	2–1	1–0 (A)	1–1 (H)		Second round	(Czechoslovakia) Spartak Praha Sokolovo	3–2	2–0 (H)	1–2 (A)
(Poland) Legia Warsaw	4–0	4–0 (A)	0–0 (H)		Quarter-finals	(Switzerland) Lausanne-Sport	6–4	2–1 (A)	4–3 (H)
(Italy) Torino	3–3 (r)	2–0 (H)	1–3 (aet) (A)	2–0	Semi-finals	(Spain) Zaragoza	3–2	2–1 (H)	1–1 (A)

== Match ==
=== Summary ===
West Ham began the game brightly, but despite chances at both ends, there was no score at half-time. The breakthrough came in the 70th minute when Ronnie Boyce threaded a pass between two defenders and Alan Sealey scored from a difficult angle. Two minutes later, a free kick to West Ham was not cleared; Bobby Moore crossed the ball, Radenkovic failed to collect the ball and Sealey scored a second goal to seal the match for West Ham.

=== Details ===
19 May 1965
19:30

1860 Munich (West Germany)	0–2	(England) West Ham United
	Report	Sealey 70', 72'

Wembley Stadium, London
Attendance: 97,974
Referee: István Zsolt (Hungary)

1860 Munich	West Ham United

GK	1	(Socialist Federal Republic of Yugoslavia) Petar Radenković
DF		(West Germany) Manfred Wagner
DF		(West Germany) Hans Reich
DF		(West Germany) Wilfried Kohlars
DF		(Socialist Federal Republic of Yugoslavia) Stevan Bena
MF		(West Germany) Otto Luttrop
MF		(West Germany) Alfred Heiß
MF		(West Germany) Hans Küppers
MF		(West Germany) Rudolf Brunnenmeier (c)
FW		(West Germany) Peter Grosser
FW		(West Germany) Hans Rebele
Manager:
(Austria) Max Merkel

GK	1	(England) Jim Standen
DF	2	(England) Joe Kirkup
DF	3	(England) Jack Burkett
MF	4	(England) Martin Peters
DF	5	(England) Ken Brown
DF	6	(England) Bobby Moore (c)
MF	7	(England) Alan Sealey
MF	8	(England) Ronnie Boyce
FW	9	(England) Geoff Hurst
FW	10	(England) Brian Dear
MF	11	(England) John Sissons
Manager:
(England) Ron Greenwood

== See also ==
- West Ham United F.C. in European football
