= 1964 DFB-Pokal final =

- Match programme cover
- Event: 1963–64 DFB-Pokal
Eintracht Frankfurt	1860 Munich
0	2
- Date: 13 June 1964
- Venue: Neckarstadion, Stuttgart
- Referee: Johannes Malka (Herten)
- Attendance: 45,000

The 1964 DFB-Pokal final decided the winner of the 1963–64 DFB-Pokal, the 21st season of Germany's knockout football cup competition. It was played on 13 June 1964 at the Neckarstadion in Stuttgart. 1860 Munich won the match 2–0 against Eintracht Frankfurt, to claim their 2nd cup title.

== Route to the final ==
The DFB-Pokal began with 32 teams in a single-elimination knockout cup competition. There were a total of four rounds leading up to the final. Teams were drawn against each other, and the winner after 90 minutes would advance. If still tied, 30 minutes of extra time was played. If the score was still level, a replay would take place at the original away team's stadium. If still level after 90 minutes, 30 minutes of extra time was played. If the score was still level, a drawing of lots would decide who would advance to the next round.

Note: In all results below, the score of the finalist is given first (H: home; A: away).

Eintracht Frankfurt		Round	1860 Munich
Opponent	Result	1963–64 DFB-Pokal	Opponent	Result
VfL Wolfsburg (A)	2–0	Round 1	Borussia Dortmund (H)	2–0
Hessen Kassel (H)	6–1	Round of 16	1. FC Kaiserslautern (H)	4–2
Schalke 04 (H)	2–1	Quarter-finals	1. FC Saarbrücken (A)	3–1
Hertha BSC (H)	3–1	Semi-finals	Altonaer FC 93 (A)	4–1 (a.e.t.)

== Match ==
=== Details ===
13 June 1964
16:00 CET

Eintracht Frankfurt	0–2	1860 Munich
	Report	Kohlars 43'; Brunnenmeier 63'

Neckarstadion, Stuttgart
Attendance: 45,000
Referee: Johannes Malka (Herten)

Eintracht Frankfurt	1860 Munich

GK	1	(West Germany) Egon Loy
RB		(West Germany) Friedel Lutz
LB		(West Germany) Hermann Höfer (c)
RH		(West Germany) Dieter Lindner
CH		(West Germany) Ludwig Landerer
LH		(West Germany) Dieter Stinka
OR		(West Germany) Helmut Kraus
IR		(West Germany) Horst Trimhold
CF		(West Germany) Erwin Stein
IL		(Austria) Wilhelm Huberts
OL		(West Germany) Lothar Schämer
Manager:
(Socialist Federal Republic of Yugoslavia) Ivica Horvat

GK	1	(Socialist Federal Republic of Yugoslavia) Petar Radenković
RB		(West Germany) Manfred Wagner
LB		(West Germany) Rudolf Steiner
RH		(West Germany) Rudolf Zeiser
CH		(West Germany) Alfons Stemmer
LH		(West Germany) Otto Luttrop
OR		(West Germany) Engelbert Kraus
IR		(West Germany) Wilfried Kohlars
CF		(West Germany) Rudolf Brunnenmeier (c)
IL		(West Germany) Hans Küppers
OL		(West Germany) Alfred Heiß
Manager:
(Austria) Max Merkel

Match rules

- 90 minutes.
- 30 minutes of extra time if necessary.
- Replay if scores still level.
- No substitutions.
