= 1964–65 West Ham United F.C. season =

English football team season

West Ham beat TSV Munich 1860 in the Cup Winners Cup final at Wembley Stadium. Both goals in the 2-0 win were scored by outside right Alan Sealey.

== League table ==
| Pos | Team | Pld | W | D | L | GF | GA | GAv | Pts | Qualification or relegation |
|---|---|---|---|---|---|---|---|---|---|---|
| 7 | Liverpool | 42 | 17 | 10 | 15 | 67 | 73 | 0.918 | 44 | Qualification for the European Cup Winners' Cup first round (Note: Liverpool qualified for the European Cup Winners' Cup as the 1964–65 FA Cup winners.) |
| 8 | Sheffield Wednesday | 42 | 16 | 11 | 15 | 57 | 55 | 1.036 | 43 | |
| 9 | West Ham United | 42 | 19 | 4 | 19 | 82 | 71 | 1.155 | 42 | Qualification for the European Cup Winners' Cup first round (Note: West Ham United qualified for the European Cup Winners' Cup as the Cup Winners' Cup winners.) |
| 10 | Blackburn Rovers | 42 | 16 | 10 | 16 | 83 | 79 | 1.051 | 42 | |
| 11 | Stoke City | 42 | 16 | 10 | 16 | 67 | 66 | 1.015 | 42 | |

Source: World Football
Rules for classification: 1) Points; 2) Goal average; 3) Goals scored

== Squad ==
| No. | | Player | Pos | Eur Apps | Eur Gls | Lge Apps | Lge Gls | FAC Apps | FAC Gls | LC Apps | LC Gls | CS Apps | CS Gls | Date signed | Previous club |
West Ham United 1965 Cup Winners Cup Final Team
| 1 | (England) | Jim Standen | GK | 8 | | 42 | | 2 | | 1 | | 1 | | 1962 | Luton |
| 2 | (England) | Joe Kirkup | RB | 5 | | 15 | 2 | 1 | | | | | | 1958 | Academy |
| 3 | (England) | Jack Burkett | LB | 5 | | 24 | | | | 1 | | 1 | | 1962 | Academy |
| 4 | (England) | Martin Peters (Hammer of the Year) | RH | 9 | 1 | 35 | 5 | 2 | | 1 | | | | 1962 | Academy |
| 5 | (England) | Ken Brown | CH | 9 | | 33 | 1 | 2 | | 1 | | 1 | | 1952 | Academy |
| 6 | (England) | Bobby Moore (Captain) | LH | 7 | | 28 | 1 | | | | | 1 | | 1958 | Academy |
| 7 | (England) | Alan Sealey | OR | 7 | 1 | 21 | 2 | 2 | | | | | | 1961 | Leyton Orient |
| 8 | (England) | Ronnie Boyce | IR | 9 | 1 | 41 | 4 | 2 | | 1 | | 1 | | 1960 | Academy |
| 9 | (England) | Geoff Hurst | CF | 9 | | 42 | 17 | 1 | 2 | 1 | | 1 | 1 | 1959 | Academy |
| 10 | (England) | Brian Dear | IL | 5 | 4 | 10 | 10 | | | | | | | 1962 | Academy |
| 11 | (England) | John Sissons | OL | 9 | 4 | 38 | 8 | 2 | 1 | 1 | | 1 | | 1962 | Academy |
Important Players
| 9 | (England) | Johnny Byrne | CF | 7 | 3 | 34 | 25 | 2 | 1 | 1 | | 1 | 1 | 1961 | Crystal Palace |
| 4 | (England) | Eddie Bovington | RH | 4 | | 33 | | 2 | | 1 | | 1 | | 1960 | Academy |
| 2 | (England) | John Bond | RB | 4 | 1 | 29 | 1 | 2 | | 1 | | 1 | | 1951 | Amateur |
| 7 | (England) | Peter Brabrook | OR | 1 | | 22 | 3 | | | 1 | 1 | 1 | | 1962 | Chelsea |
Other Players
| 11 | (England) | Tony Scott | OL | | | 6 | | 2 | | | | | | 1959 | Academy |
| 3 | (England) | Eddie Presland | FB | | | 4 | 1 | | | | | | | 1964 | Academy |
| 5 | (England) | Dave Bickles | M | | | 2 | | | | | | | | 1963 | Academy |
| 7 | (England) | Peter Bennett | F | | | 1 | | | | | | | | 1963 | Academy |
| 4 | (England) | John Charles | FB | | | 1 | | | | | | | | 1962 | Academy |
| 4 | (England) | Trevor Dawkins | RB | | | 1 | | | | | | | | 1964 | Academy |
| 1 | (England) | Alan Dickie | GK | 1 | | | | | | | | | | 1961 | Academy |
