= Josef Wendl =

German footballer

Personal information
- Date of birth: 17 December 1906
- Date of death: 2 September 1980 (aged 73)
- Position: Defender

Senior career*
Years	Team	Apps	(Gls)
- TSV 1860 München

International career
1930–1933	Germany	5	(0)
- * Club domestic league appearances and goals

Josef Wendl (17 December 1906 – 2 September 1980) was a German international footballer.

== Career ==
=== Association, 1916 to 1945 ===
The pupil Josef Wendl, who joined went through the youth section of the Munich "Löwen" youth section completely through the youth age groups of the white and blue sixties and was used for the first time at the age of 17 in the league team playing at that time in the district league Bavaria. In the 1926/27 season, the defensive hope had its first successes in 1860. In Bavaria, he won the runner-up championship with his club, with third place in the games for the southern German championship, the “Löwen” moved into the final round of the German Football Championship. There, the young player sat alongside his teammates Alois Pledl, Eugen Kling and Josef Hornauer against FC Schalke 04 and VfB Leipzig and only failed in the semifinals with 1: 4 goals to the future German champion 1. FC Nürnberg. Wendl had been the left-wing outrunner in all finals.

In the season 1930/31 Wendl qualified for the second time with the SV 1860 Munich for the final matches for the German championship, The Elf from Giesing also skipped the hurdle in the semi-finals, knocking out the Holstein Kiel with a 2–0 win and moving into the final of the German football championship for the first time in club history. The final was lost in front of 50,000 spectators on June 14, 1931, at the Müngersdorfer Stadion in Cologne with 2: 3 goals after a 2: 1 halftime lead against Hertha BSC. Wendl formed with Max Schäfer in front of goalkeeper Alfred Riemke the pair of defenders and acted in his previous left runner position Fritz Eiberle.

Two years later, in 1932/33, Wendl and his teammates Georg Ertl, Fritz Neumaier, Ludwig Stiglbauer and Ludwig Lachner lost the semi-finals in the final tournament with 0: 4 goals in Leipzig against Schalke 04. In the Gauliga era he came again as a 34-year-old veteran 1941 into the final tournament, As the middle runner in the group matches against the Stuttgarter Kickers, the VfL Neckarau and SK Rapid Wien he directed the defense of the "Löwen". The 2–1 home win on April 27 in front of 30,000 spectators was outstanding when he had to assert himself particularly against the rapid scorer Franz Binder and attacked Heinz Krückeberg and Ludwig Janda provided the impulses. The relatives of the Wehrmacht and team captain Wendl were prevented from playing the decisive second leg in Vienna and Rapid won the first group place with a 2–0 victory by two points ahead of 1860 Munich. The Viennese prevailed in the later final on June 22 through a 4: 3 victory against Schalke 04 and won the German championship in 1941.

When his club was able to bring the Tschammer Cup to Munich on November 15, 1942, after a 2–0 win in the final against Schalke 04, he had only 5: 3 home success on July 19 due to the war 1942 participated in the first final round against SK Rapid Vienna as a left-back alongside Georg Pledl.

In total, the defensive player who held the captain's office for ten years was active for 1860 Munich as a league player and played over 1,000 games. The last time was Wendl in spring 1945 was in a competitive game for the "lions" during a front holiday.

=== Selection and appointment, 1927 to 1935 ===
At the age of 19, the man for the left defensive side was already called into the Munich City Selection, for which he played a total of 28 games in his career. In the South German selection, the 1960 made its debut on October 9, 1927, in the Federal Cup competition in the 3: 4 defeat in Duisburg against West Germany. The game played a complete Munich city selection, with six "Bayern" actors (Adolf Schwab, Hans Schmid, Emil Kutterer, Ludwig Hofmeister, Josef Pöttinger, Ludwig Hofmann), four "Löwen" representatives (Alois Pledl, Ludwig Stiglbauer, Josef Hornauer, Josef Wendl) and the Wacker player Fritz Neubauer. With the association selection from Bavaria, Wendl became Gaupokalsieger in 1933. He was part of the Bavarian selection, which defeated Saxony with 2: 1 goals in Chemnitz and 6: 2 goals in Munich North Hesse. In the replay of the final, Bayern won 6–1 on August 6, 1933, in Munich against Brandenburg. The final triangle was formed by goalkeepers Hans Jakob and the pair of defenders Sigmund Haringer and Josef Wendl.

In the national football team, the "Löwen" player made his debut with goalkeeper Hans Jakob on November 2, 1930, at the international match in Wroclaw against Norway. On his second appointment on October 30, 1932, in Budapest against Hungary, Paul Janes celebrated his national team debut. In his third and fourth international matches - in January and March 1933 against Italy and France - he formed the German defense pair in front of goalkeeper Jakob with Haringer. With his fifth international appearance on November 19, 1933, in Zurich, Wendl said goodbye to the national team in a 2–0 victory against the Confederates. The Bayern player Ludwig Goldbrunner, on the other hand, opened his international career in the game against "Nati".

== Profession, soldier and honors ==
Wendl, who was named honorary captain, received the city honorary letter Wendl took over the city of Munich on August 31, 1934, as a workshop clerk, and on March 1, 1935, he was given a job as a road construction supervisor. On June 17, 1940, he was called up to the Wehrmacht and was on the front lines until the end of the war. In May 1945 he was captured by the Soviet Union and was only able to return home on January 5, 1950, where he returned to the Munich Roads Department.

== Trainer ==
Soon after returning from captivity, he began working as a trainer at TSV 1860 Munich in the youth department. At the sports university in Cologne, he successfully completed his training as a football teacher in 1953. Until the end of July 1965 he worked as a trainer and supervisor in the youth department of the "Löwen", where he played such well-known players as Alfred Heiß, Hans Rebele, Hans Reich and Ludwig Bründl.

== Literature ==
- Anton Löffelmeier: The "lions" under the swastika. The workshop, 2009, ISBN 978-3-89533-645-4.
- Lorenz Knieriem, Hardy Green: "Player dictionary 1890-1963." Agon, Kassel 2006, ISBN 3-89784-148-7.
- Jürgen Bitter: Germany's national soccer player. The Lexicon. Sportverlag, Berlin 1997, ISBN 3-328-00749-0.

== Nation ==
He has made 5 appearances with his own national team.

== Biography ==
- Anton Löffelmeier: Die Löwen unterm Hakenkreuz. Die Werkstatt, 2009, ISBN 978-3-89533-645-4.
- Lorenz Knieriem, Hardy Grüne: Spielerlexikon 1890–1963. Agon, Kassel 2006, ISBN 3-89784-148-7.
- Jürgen Bitter: Deutschlands Fußball-Nationalspieler. Das Lexikon. Sportverlag, Berlin 1997, ISBN 3-328-00749-0.
