= 1965–66 Bundesliga =

3rd season of the Bundesliga

Bundesliga
- Season: 1965–66
- Dates: 14 August 1965 – 28 May 1966
- Champions: 1860 Munich; 1st Bundesliga title 1st German title
- Relegated: Borussia Neunkirchen; Tasmania Berlin
- European Cup: 1860 Munich
- Cup Winners' Cup: Borussia Dortmund (title holders); Bayern Munich
- Goals: 987
- Average goals/game: 3.23
- Top goalscorer: Lothar Emmerich (31)
- Biggest home win: Hamburg 8–0 Karlsruhe (12 February 1966)
- Biggest away win: Tasmania Berlin 0–9 Meiderich (26 March 1966)
- Highest scoring: M'gladbach 8–3 Nürnberg (11 goals) (12 March 1966)

The 1965–66 Bundesliga was the third season of the Bundesliga, West Germany's premier football league. It began on 14 August 1965 and ended on 28 May 1966. Werder Bremen were the defending champions.

== Competition modus ==
Every team played two games against each other team, one at home and one away. Teams received two points for a win and one point for a draw. If two or more teams were tied on points, places were determined by goal average. The team with the most points were crowned champions while the two teams with the fewest points were relegated to their respective Regionalliga divisions.

== Team changes to 1964–65 ==
Karlsruher SC and FC Schalke 04 would initially have been relegated for finishing in the bottom two places. However, Hertha BSC were found guilty of illegal financial behavior and, as a consequence, had their Bundesliga license revoked. The Deutscher Fußball-Bund, the governing body for football in West Germany, then decided to keep Karlsruhe and Schalke in the league and expand its size to 18 teams. Bayern Munich and Borussia Mönchengladbach were promoted after having won their respective promotion play-off groups. In order to still have a representative from West Berlin in the league, the amateur side Tasmania 1900 Berlin were also granted promotion.

== Season overview ==
The 1965–66 season was the inaugural season for two of the most successful clubs regarding league titles in Bundesliga history, Borussia Mönchengladbach and Bayern Munich. It was also the first time that a city had two clubs in the Bundesliga. Bayern were a title contender for large parts of the season, but eventually were held short three points by their cross-town rivals 1860, who won their first championship. Nevertheless, the newcomers had something to celebrate as well, as they won the DFB Cup one week after the end of the season, which they finished in third place.

Borussia Dortmund finished in second place, ahead on goal average to Bayern Munich. They also had huge title chances until late in the season, but were beaten 2–0 at home by 1860 on the second-to-last match day. However, Dortmund did not end the season without a title as well, as they beat Liverpool 2–1 after extra time in the UEFA Cup Winners' Cup final at Glasgow's Hampden Park three days earlier. It marked the first time that a German club had won a European championship.

Another famous German club Tasmania Berlin were added to the league just two weeks before the start of the season after city rivals Hertha BSC had been thrown out on financial irregularities. They were not even first choice for a replacement as the Berlin representative, as they had only finished in third place in Regionalliga Berlin. But when champions Tennis Borussia were considered too weak after failing in the promotion play-off rounds and therefore were not asked, and runners-up Spandauer SV declined their interest in a Bundesliga spot as well, Tasmania gladly accepted the invitation by the German FA.

The decision turned out to be a fatal one for the club. Tasmania's team was never capable of competing in the Bundesliga. They set up a various number of records, including, among others, lowest point total (8), fewest wins (2), most losses (28), fewest goals scored (15), most goals against (108) and lowest match attendance for a Bundesliga game (827 against Borussia Mönchengladbach on 15 January 1966). Most of the records are still intact.

== Team overview ==
Location of teams in Bundesliga 1965–66

Club	Ground	Capacity
Tasmania 1900 Berlin	Olympiastadion	100,000
Eintracht Braunschweig	Eintracht-Stadion	38,000
SV Werder Bremen	Weserstadion	32,000
Borussia Dortmund	Stadion Rote Erde	30,000
Eintracht Frankfurt	Waldstadion	87,000
Hamburger SV	Volksparkstadion	80,000
Hannover 96	Niedersachsenstadion	86,000
1. FC Kaiserslautern	Stadion Betzenberg	42,000
Karlsruher SC	Wildparkstadion	50,000
1. FC Köln	Müngersdorfer Stadion	76,000
Meidericher SV	Wedaustadion	38,500
Borussia Mönchengladbach	Bökelbergstadion	34,500
TSV 1860 München	Stadion an der Grünwalder Straße	44,300
FC Bayern Munich	Stadion an der Grünwalder Straße	44,300
Borussia Neunkirchen	Ellenfeld	32,000
1. FC Nürnberg	Städtisches Stadion	64,238
FC Schalke 04	Glückauf-Kampfbahn	35,000
VfB Stuttgart	Neckarstadion	53,000

== League table ==
Pos	Team	Pld	W	D	L	GF	GA	GR	Pts	Qualification or relegation
1	1860 Munich (C)	34	20	10	4	80	40	2.000	50	Qualification to European Cup first round
2	Borussia Dortmund	34	19	9	6	70	36	1.944	47	Qualification to Cup Winners' Cup second round (Note: Borussia Dortmund won the 1965–66 European Cup Winners' Cup and thereby automatically qualified as defending champions.)
3	Bayern Munich	34	20	7	7	71	38	1.868	47	Qualification to Cup Winners' Cup first round
4	Werder Bremen	34	21	3	10	76	40	1.900	45	
5	1. FC Köln	34	19	6	9	74	41	1.805	44	
6	1. FC Nürnberg	34	14	11	9	54	43	1.256	39	Qualification to Inter-Cities Fairs Cup first round
7	Eintracht Frankfurt	34	16	6	12	64	46	1.391	38	Qualification to Inter-Cities Fairs Cup first round
8	Meidericher SV	34	14	8	12	70	48	1.458	36	
9	Hamburger SV	34	13	8	13	64	52	1.231	34	
10	Eintracht Braunschweig	34	11	12	11	49	49	1.000	34	
11	VfB Stuttgart	34	13	6	15	42	48	0.875	32	Qualification to Inter-Cities Fairs Cup first round
12	Hannover 96	34	11	8	15	59	57	1.035	30	
13	Borussia Mönchengladbach	34	9	11	14	57	68	0.838	29	
14	Schalke 04	34	10	7	17	33	55	0.600	27	
15	1. FC Kaiserslautern	34	8	10	16	42	65	0.646	26	
16	Karlsruher SC	34	9	6	19	35	71	0.493	24	
17	Borussia Neunkirchen (R)	34	9	4	21	32	82	0.390	22	Relegation to Regionalliga
18	Tasmania Berlin (R)	34	2	4	28	15	108	0.139	8	Relegation to Regionalliga

Rules for classification: 1) points; 2) goal ratio.
(C) Champions; (R) Relegated

== Results ==
Home \ Away	SCT	EBS	SVW	BVB	SGE	HSV	H96	FCK	KSC	KOE	MSV	BMG	M60	FCB	BNE	FCN	S04	VFB
Tasmania Berlin	—	0–2	1–1	0–2	0–3	0–4	1–5	1–1	2–0	0–6	0–9	0–0	0–5	0–2	2–1	0–1	1–2	0–2
Eintracht Braunschweig	3–1	—	1–0	4–0	2–2	1–4	2–1	1–1	2–0	1–2	1–0	1–1	2–2	2–4	1–2	3–0	3–0	1–1
Werder Bremen	5–0	4–0	—	1–0	3–2	2–0	3–3	4–1	3–1	2–1	2–0	2–0	0–2	1–1	5–2	1–0	2–0	3–1
Borussia Dortmund	3–1	1–1	2–1	—	3–0	2–2	4–0	4–0	4–1	3–2	1–1	3–1	0–2	3–0	1–0	2–0	7–0	4–0
Eintracht Frankfurt	4–0	4–1	1–0	4–1	—	2–0	0–1	6–0	1–0	0–0	2–0	3–1	5–2	0–0	1–2	1–2	4–1	3–2
Hamburger SV	5–1	2–1	1–3	1–1	0–1	—	2–1	4–1	8–0	2–2	2–0	5–0	1–2	0–4	3–0	0–2	1–1	4–1
Hannover 96	5–0	1–1	2–1	1–1	4–1	0–0	—	4–0	5–2	1–1	0–3	2–1	0–1	3–4	6–0	2–2	0–3	4–2
1. FC Kaiserslautern	0–0	1–1	2–3	0–0	5–2	2–1	1–1	—	1–0	3–2	1–0	1–2	3–0	1–2	0–0	0–0	3–2	1–2
Karlsruher SC	3–0	1–4	3–2	0–0	4–0	1–4	1–0	1–0	—	2–1	0–4	3–3	1–1	1–0	1–1	1–2	1–0	3–0
1. FC Köln	4–0	3–0	2–0	1–2	1–0	5–1	0–1	3–2	2–0	—	1–1	2–2	3–1	6–1	4–2	2–1	2–1	3–1
Meidericher SV	3–0	4–1	1–2	2–1	0–0	3–1	2–2	2–2	8–2	2–3	—	3–2	2–3	1–1	1–0	1–2	5–1	5–2
Borussia Mönchengladbach	5–0	1–0	0–7	4–5	1–2	0–0	2–0	2–0	1–1	2–3	1–2	—	1–1	1–2	4–1	8–3	2–0	1–0
1860 Munich	4–0	1–1	3–1	2–1	4–2	1–1	5–0	4–2	2–0	2–1	3–3	3–3	—	1–0	4–1	1–1	3–0	0–0
Bayern Munich	2–1	2–2	3–1	0–2	2–0	3–0	3–1	3–0	5–1	1–4	3–0	5–2	3–0	—	6–0	0–0	1–0	0–1
Borussia Neunkirchen	3–1	1–0	1–2	1–3	1–6	1–1	1–0	1–4	1–0	2–1	0–1	1–1	1–9	0–4	—	2–1	1–0	1–2
1. FC Nürnberg	7–2	1–1	2–1	0–0	0–0	5–0	2–1	1–1	3–0	2–0	4–1	2–2	1–4	2–2	3–1	—	1–0	1–1
Schalke 04	4–0	1–1	1–6	2–3	3–2	2–1	1–0	2–1	0–0	0–0	0–0	0–0	0–2	1–1	2–0	1–0	—	2–0
VfB Stuttgart	2–0	0–1	0–2	1–1	0–0	1–3	4–2	4–1	1–0	0–1	2–0	5–0	0–0	0–1	2–0	1–0	1–0	—

Source: DFB
Legend: Blue = home team win; Yellow = draw; Red = away team win.

== Top scorers ==
31 goals

- (Germany) Lothar Emmerich (Borussia Dortmund)

26 goals

- (Germany) Friedhelm Konietzka (TSV 1860 Munich)

20 goals

- (Germany) Arnold Schütz (Werder Bremen)

18 goals

- (Germany) Peter Grosser (TSV 1860 Munich)
- (Germany) Hannes Löhr (1. FC Köln)
- (Germany) Manfred Pohlschmidt (Hamburger SV)

17 goals

- (Austria) Wilhelm Huberts (Eintracht Frankfurt)
- (Germany) Lothar Ulsaß (Eintracht Braunschweig)

16 goals

- (Germany) Bernd Rupp (Borussia Mönchengladbach)

15 goals

- (Germany) Rudolf Brunnenmeier (TSV 1860 Munich)
- (Germany) Hans Siemensmayer (Hannover 96)

== Champion squad ==
TSV 1860 München
Goalkeeper: Petar Radenković (Socialist Federal Republic of Yugoslavia) (34).

Defenders: Bernd Patzke (28); Hans Reich (26); Manfred Wagner (26); Rudolf Zeiser (12); Rudolf Steiner (9).
Midfielders: Željko Perušić (Socialist Federal Republic of Yugoslavia) (34); Peter Grosser (32 / 18); Otto Luttrop (22 / 1); Hans Küppers (19 / 4); Wilfried Kohlars (19).
Forwards: Friedhelm Konietzka (33 / 26); Alfred Heiß (31 / 10); Rudolf Brunnenmeier (27 / 15); Hans Rebele (22 / 5).
(league appearances and goals listed in brackets)

Manager: Max Merkel (Austria) .

On the roster but did not play in a league game: Wilfried Tepe; Alfred Kohlhäufl; Ludwig Bründl; Hans Fischer; Helmut Richert; Ernst Winterhalder.

== See also ==
- 1965–66 DFB-Pokal
