= Alfred Pyka =

German footballer

Personal information
- Full name: Alfred Pyka
- Date of birth: 28 June 1934
- Place of birth: Germany
- Date of death: 10 January 2012 (aged 77)
- Position: Midfielder

Senior career*
Years	Team	Apps	(Gls)
1953–1964	Westfalia Herne		
1964–1965	TSV 1860 München		
1965–1967	Schalke 04	58	(5)
1967–1968	Westfalia Herne		

International career
1958	West Germany	1	(0)
- * Club domestic league appearances and goals

Alfred Pyka (28 June 1934 – 10 January 2012) was a German international footballer who played for Westfalia Herne, TSV 1860 München and Schalke 04.
