= Manfred Wagner (footballer, born 1938) =

German footballer

Personal information
- Date of birth: 31 August 1938
- Place of birth: Munich, Germany
- Date of death: 10 February 2015 (aged 76)
- Place of death: Munich, Germany
- Height: 1.80 m (5 ft 11 in)
- Position: Defender

Senior career*
Years	Team	Apps	(Gls)
1963–1970	TSV 1860 Munich	187	(3)
- * Club domestic league appearances and goals

Manfred Wagner (31 August 1938 – 10 February 2015) was a German football defender.

Between 1963 and 1970 he played 187 Bundesliga games for TSV 1860 Munich. His greatest successes were the 1966 league championship, as well as reaching the 1965 UEFA Cup Winners' Cup Final.

== Honours ==
1860 Munich

- UEFA Cup Winners' Cup finalist: 1964–65
- Bundesliga: 1965–66; runner-up: 1966–67
- DFB-Pokal: 1963–64
