= Helmut Richert =

German footballer

Personal information
- Date of birth: 23 July 1941
- Place of birth: Düren, Germany
- Date of death: 28 June 2024 (aged 82)
- Place of death: Munich, Germany
- Position: Forward

Senior career*
Years	Team	Apps	(Gls)
1965–1966	TSV 1860 Munich		
1966–1968	Bayer 04 Leverkusen		
1968–1970	Fortuna Düsseldorf		

Managerial career
- 1976–1977: SSV Jahn Regensburg
- 1978–1979: MTV Ingolstadt
- 1980–1981: Holstein Kiel
- 1989–1990: FC Vaduz
- * Club domestic league appearances and goals

Helmut Richert (23 July 1941 – 28 June 2024) was a German football striker and later manager.
