= Willi Bierofka =

German footballer

Personal information
- Date of birth: 21 January 1953 (age 73)
- Place of birth: Munich, West Germany
- Height: 1.74 m (5 ft 9 in)
- Position: Defender

Youth career
- –1971: Bayern Munich

Senior career*
Years	Team	Apps	(Gls)
1971–1973	SC Fürstenfeldbruck		
1973–1979	TSV 1860 Munich		

Managerial career
- 1988–1990: TSV 1860 Munich
- 1999–2003: FC Ismaning
- * Club domestic league appearances and goals

Willi Bierofka (born 21 January 1953) is a retired German football defender and later manager.
