= Željko Perušić =

Croatian footballer

Personal information
- Date of birth: 23 March 1937
- Place of birth: Duga Resa, Kingdom of Yugoslavia
- Date of death: 28 September 2017 (aged 81)
- Place of death: St. Gallen, Switzerland
- Height: 1.64 m (5 ft 4 1/2 in)
- Position: Midfielder

Senior career*
Years	Team	Apps	(Gls)
1958–1965	Dinamo Zagreb	125	(9)
1965–1970	1860 München	138	(1)
1970–1973	St. Gallen	78	(1)
Total		341	(11)

International career
1959–1964	Yugoslavia	27	(0)

Managerial career
- 1970–1974: St. Gallen
- 1974–1975: Vaduz
- 1977–1979: Brühl
Medal record
Men's Football
Representing Yugoslavia
Olympic Games
Gold medal – first place	1960 Rome	Team
European Championship
Silver medal – second place	1960 France	Team
- * Club domestic league appearances and goals

Željko Perušić (23 March 1937 – 28 September 2017) was a Croatian footballer. He was part of the Yugoslav squad that won gold at the 1960 Summer Olympics.

== Club career ==
During his club career he played for NK Dinamo Zagreb, TSV 1860 München and FC St. Gallen.

== International career ==
He made his debut for Yugoslavia in a November 1959 Olympic Games qualification match against Greece and earned a total of 27 caps, scoring no goals. He participated in the 1960 European Nations' Cup. His final international was a March 1964 friendly away against Bulgaria.

== Post-playing career ==
He then became a football manager in Switzerland.

== Honours ==
=== Club ===
Dinamo Zagreb

- Yugoslav First League: 1957–58
- Yugoslav Cup: 1959–60, 1962–63

TSV 1860 Munich

- Bundesliga: 1965–66

=== International ===
Yugoslavia

- Olympic Gold Medal: 1960
