= Enrico Albrigi =

Italian footballer (born 1943)

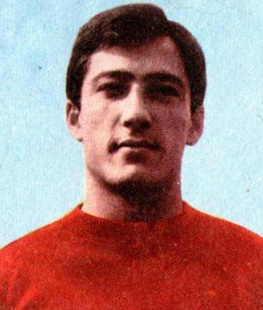

Personal information
- Date of birth: 5 January 1943 (age 83)
- Place of birth: Castiglione Olona, Italy
- Position: Forward

Senior career*
Years	Team	Apps	(Gls)
1961–1962	Torino	13	(2)
1962–1963	Verona	11	(1)
1963–1966	Torino	14	(4)
1966–1967	Catania	31	(1)
1967–1968	Torino	1	(0)
1968–1971	Livorno	74	(6)
1971–1972	S.P.A.L.	11	(0)
- * Club domestic league appearances and goals as of 21 February 2015

Enrico Albrigi (born 5 January 1943) is an Italian former footballer who played as forward.
