= Stevan Bena =

Serbian footballer

Personal information
- Full name: Stevan Bena
- Date of birth: 23 August 1935
- Place of birth: Pančevo, Kingdom of Yugoslavia
- Date of death: 6 May 2012 (aged 76)
- Place of death: Belgrade, Serbia
- Position: Defensive midfielder

Youth career
- Dinamo Pančevo

Senior career*
Years	Team	Apps	(Gls)
1955–1956	Dinamo Pančevo	6	(3)
1956–1963	Vojvodina	98	(14)
1964–1965	1860 Munich	9	(0)
1965–1967	Hannover 96	48	(3)
1968	Oakland Clippers	24	(0)
1970	Dallas Tornado	2	(0)

International career
1959–1961	Yugoslavia	7	(0)

Managerial career
- Galenika Zemun (assistant)
- Vršac
- 1989: Selangor
- * Club domestic league appearances and goals

Stevan Bena (Serbian Cyrillic: Стеван Бена; 23 August 1935 – 6 May 2012) was a Serbian footballer. He played for TSV 1860 Munich, playing in the UEFA Cup Winners' Cup at the Wembley Stadium in London in 1965, which was won by West Ham United (2–0).

== International career ==
On the national level, Bena made his debut for Yugoslavia in an October 1959 friendly match against Hungary and earned a total of 7 caps (no goals). His final international was a December 1961 friendly away against Israel.
