= Hans Reich =

German footballer

Personal information
- Date of birth: 10 July 1942 (age 84)
- Place of birth: Munich, Germany
- Height: 1.80 m (5 ft 11 in)
- Position: Defender

Senior career*
| Years | Team | Apps | (Gls) |
| 1960–1969 | TSV 1860 München | 179 | (6) |
| 1969–1971 | Kickers Offenbach | 21 | (0) |
| 1971–1974 | SK VÖEST Linz | | |
| 1974–1976 | TSV 1860 München | 69 | (1) |
- * Club domestic league appearances and goals

Hans Reich (born 10 July 1942) is a German former football player. He spent seven seasons in the Bundesliga with TSV 1860 München and Kickers Offenbach.

== Honours ==
- UEFA Cup Winners' Cup finalist: 1964–65
- Bundesliga champion: 1965–66
- DFB-Pokal winner: 1963–64, 1969–70
- Austrian Football Bundesliga champion: 1973–74
