= Max Schäfer =

German footballer and manager

Personal information
- Date of birth: 17 January 1907
- Date of death: 15 September 1990 (aged 83)
- Position: Defender

Senior career*
Years	Team	Apps	(Gls)
- TSV 1860 München

International career
1934	Germany	1	(0)

Managerial career
- 1937–1938: TSV 1860 München
- 1941–1945: TSV 1860 München
- 1946–1951: TSV 1860 München
- 1951–1953: FC Bayern Munich
- 1953–1956: TSV 1860 München
- * Club domestic league appearances and goals

Max Schäfer (17 January 1907 – 15 September 1990) was a German international footballer and manager.
