= Rudolf Brunnenmeier =

German footballer (1941–2003)

Personal information
- Date of birth: 11 February 1941
- Place of birth: Munich, Germany
- Date of death: 18 April 2003 (aged 62)
- Place of death: Olching, Germany
- Position: Striker

Youth career
- –1960: SC Olching

Senior career*
Years	Team	Apps	(Gls)
1960–1968	1860 Munich	207	(139)
1968–1972	Neuchatel Xamax		
1972–1973	FC Zürich		
1973–1977	SW Bregenz		
1977–1980	FC Balzers		

International career
1964–1965	West Germany	5	(3)
- * Club domestic league appearances and goals

Rudolf "Rudi" Brunnenmeier (11 February 1941 – 18 April 2003) was a German football player. The former top scorer of the Bundesliga and five times player for Germany is closely associated with the great era of 1860 Munich in the 1960s.

== Career ==
The forward played from 1960 until 1968 for 1860 Munich. Initially, from 1960 to 1963 the club was in the Oberliga Süd, the southern division of the then five-way split German first division. There, 1860 won the league in 1963, yielding the title of "South German Champions", a berth in the play-offs for the national championship of that year, and most importantly a place in the first Bundesliga season 1963–64. In the Oberliga years Brunnenmeier contributed an impressive 73 goals in 88 matches.

In the Bundesliga the team coached by Max Merkel continued its success, winning the German Cup in 1964. Brunnenmeier not only contributed 19 goals in 29 league matches, but also scored the decisive 2–0 in the cup final versus Frankfurt.

In the next season Brunnenmeier rose his Bundesliga tally to 24 goals, which made him top scorer in that season. Most importantly the club reached the Cup Winners' Cup 1965 which took place in front of a crowd of 100 000 in the Wembley Stadium in London. Effectively this turned out to be an away match, as West Ham United were the opponents. "Hammers" keeper Jim Standen made fine saves from 1860 captain Brunnenmeier and eventually two goals by Alan Sealey twenty minutes before time saw West Ham captain Bobby Moore lifting his first of all together three trophies within one year in Wembley.

In these years, 1964 and 1965, Brunnenmeier also played five times for the West Germany. He scored three goals in those matches.

1966 saw the peak of the Sixtiers, when they won the hitherto only championship title of their history. Peter Grosser and Hans Rebele powered the offensive style. Players like Luttrop and Reich performed defensive roles.

But Brunnenmeier had already peaked before. In the championship season he only scored 15 goals, his lowest season output since he joined the club. And the club went downhill from then on forth, so did Brunnenmeier. As the club's placings moved into double digits, so did Brunnenmeier's annual tallies turn single digit: seven goals stood at the end of the 1966–67 season and in the next season, which should be his last with the Lions he even only was left with one single goal after only 12 matches.

Brunnenmeier left with all together 66 goals in 119 league matches, which remain club record, and is considered one of the greatest forwards in 1860s history.

After his time in Munich he initially played for four years with Xamax Neuchatel in the Swiss first division followed by a year with FC Zürich.

From 1973 until 1977 he was still on the books with SW Bregenz in Austria before playing three more years with amateur side FC Balzers in Liechtenstein.

After the end of his years as player, Brunnenmeier increasingly had problems due to his inclination to alcohol abuse which eventually impoverished him. Odd jobs helped him to get by. Eventually, on 18 April 2003 he died from alcohol-related issues.

His funeral took place under significant public attention. The championship winning side of 1966 and many fans paid their last tribute to this icon of TSV 1860 Munich.

== Honours ==
1860 Munich

- Bundesliga: 1965–66
- DFB-Pokal: 1963–64
- South German Championship: 1962–63
- European Cup Winners' Cup: runner-up 1964–65

Individual

- Bundesliga top scorer: 1965, 24 goals
