= Alan Sealey =

English footballer

Personal information
- Full name: Alan William Sealey
- Date of birth: 24 February 1942
- Place of birth: Hampton, England
- Date of death: February 1996 (aged 53–54)
- Position: Outside right

Youth career
- Memorial Sports

Senior career*
Years	Team	Apps	(Gls)
1960	Leyton Orient	4	(1)
1961–1967	West Ham United	107	(22)
1967	Plymouth Argyle	4	(0)
1968–1969	Bedford Town	15	(2)
1969–1970	Romford	19	(4)
1971	Ashford Town		
Total		149	(29)
- * Club domestic league appearances and goals

Alan William Sealey (24 February 1942 – February 1996) was an English footballer. Sealey, an outside right, initially played for Leyton Orient in 1960, before moving to West Ham United, in a player exchange for Dave Dunmore, where he played from 1961 to 1967.

Sealey celebrated getting married in May 1965 just one week before he would go on to score both goals in West Ham's 2–0 win against TSV 1860 Munich in the 1965 European Cup Winners' Cup final at Wembley Stadium. He had previously scored just three goals for the east London club that season.

Sealey's top flight career virtually ended within a year of this. He was playing cricket with teammates during a rest in pre-season training, and broke his leg while falling over a wooden bench. He ended his league career playing for Plymouth Argyle in 1967, but continued playing with non-league sides Bedford Town, Romford and Ashford Town.

His family maintained its close connection to West Ham United, with his nephew, Les, and grand-nephews signing for the team between 1994 and 2001. Sealey died suddenly at his home in Collier Row, Romford in February 1996 from a heart attack, aged 53, just over five years before the same condition would claim the life of his nephew, Les at age 43. The older Sealey was survived by his wife Barbara and his son Anthony.

== Honours ==
West Ham United

- FA Cup: 1963–64
- European Cup Winners' Cup: 1964–65
