= Ludwig Bründl =

German footballer

Personal information
- Date of birth: 23 November 1946 (age 79)
- Place of birth: Munich, Germany
- Height: 1.72 m (5 ft 8 in)
- Position: Forward

Youth career
- 1959–1965: 1860 Munich

Senior career*
Years	Team	Apps	(Gls)
1965–1968	1860 Munich	42	(13)
1968–1969	1. FC Köln	13	(1)
1969–1971	Stuttgarter Kickers	71	(34)
1971–1975	Eintracht Braunschweig	120	(49)
1975–1978	Vevey Sports		

International career
1965	West Germany U-23		
- * Club domestic league appearances and goals

Ludwig "Bubi" Bründl (born 23 November 1946) is a German former professional footballer who played as a forward, spending eight seasons in the Bundesliga between 1965 and 1975. 1860 Munich won their first and only Bundesliga title in 1966 during Bründl's first season with the senior team, although he made no appearance on the field. Bründl enjoyed the most successful spell of his career with Eintracht Braunschweig, where he scored a total of 67 goals in 148 games in all official competitions between 1971 and 1975. This includes ten goals in six games in the 1971–72 UEFA Cup, which made Bründl the tournament's first top scorer.

== Honours ==
1860 Munich

- Bundesliga: 1965–66

Individual

- UEFA Cup top scorer: 1971–72
