= Rudolf Steiner (footballer, born 1937) =

German footballer

Personal information
- Date of birth: 7 April 1937
- Date of death: 3 December 2015 (aged 78)
- Height: 1.70 m (5 ft 7 in)
- Position: Defender

Senior career*
Years	Team	Apps	(Gls)
1956–1960	SC München von 1906		
1960–1969	TSV 1860 München	176	(5)

International career
1964	Germany	1	(0)
- * Club domestic league appearances and goals

Rudolf Steiner (7 April 1937 – 3 December 2015) was a German football player. He spent 6 seasons in the Bundesliga with TSV 1860 München. He represented Germany once in a friendly against Scotland.

== Honours ==
- UEFA Cup Winners' Cup finalist: 1965.
- Bundesliga champion: 1966.
- Bundesliga runner-up: 1967.
- DFB-Pokal winner: 1964.
