= Brian Dear =

English footballer

Personal information
- Full name: Brian Charles Dear
- Date of birth: 18 September 1943 (age 83)
- Place of birth: Plaistow, Essex, England
- Position: Striker

Youth career
- West Ham United

Senior career*
Years	Team	Apps	(Gls)
1962–1969	West Ham United	65	(33)
1967	→ Brighton & Hove Albion (loan)	7	(5)
1969	Fulham	13	(7)
1969–1970	Millwall	6	(0)
1970	West Ham United	4	(0)
- Woodford Town
Total		88	(45)
- * Club domestic league appearances and goals

Brian Charles Dear (born 18 September 1943) is an English former professional footballer who played as a striker in the Football League for West Ham United, Brighton & Hove Albion, Fulham and Millwall.

== Career ==
Dear was born in Plaistow, to parents originating from Tottenham. Nicknamed Stag, Dear started his career with West Ham United, joining the club at the age of 15, and represented England Schools. He made his Hammers debut against Wolverhampton Wanderers on 29 August 1962, and went on to make 69 league appearances for the club, scoring 33 goals. He was a member of the 1964–65 European Cup Winners' Cup-winning side.

He holds the record for the quickest ever five goals in an English game, 20 minutes either side of half time, in a home tie against West Brom on 16 April 1965.

Out on loan to Brighton & Hove Albion, Dear managed to score five goals in seven games. He moved to Fulham for £20,000 in 1969 but, after a short spell at Millwall, moved back to West Ham in October 1970.

His second spell at Upton Park was short-lived and Dear featured in only four games during the 1970–71 season. Dear played his last game for the club on 19 December 1970, wearing the number 9 shirt against Chelsea at Stamford Bridge. The following month, he and three West Ham teammates – Bobby Moore, Jimmy Greaves and Clyde Best, along with the club's trainer – were all fined a week's wages and banned for two games by West Ham manager Ron Greenwood after going out drinking in a nightclub until the early hours of the morning prior to an FA Cup third-round tie against Blackpool. "The game was played on an awful pitch and we lost 4–0. Blackpool had a lad called Tony Green, who probably had the game of his life." The directors wanted to sack all five individuals. "I never played very much after that, and at the end of the season I was given a free transfer. I went into non-League with Woodford Town. Jimmy only had another year's contract and he too ended in non-League. Bobby played on, but they never made it easy for him and he moved to Fulham."

Peter Shilton named Dear as his toughest opponent.

== After football ==
After retiring as a footballer and working as a publican for some years, he joined Southend United as catering manager.

Dear was awarded the Freedom of the City of London in 2001 in recognition of his charity work.

Dear provides a weekly column on West Ham United for the Yellow Advertiser online newspaper.

== Honours ==
West Ham

- European Cup Winners' Cup: 1964–65
- Football League Cup runner-up: 1965–66
