= Engelbert Kraus =

German footballer

Personal information
- Full name: Engelbert Kraus
- Date of birth: 30 July 1934
- Place of birth: Offenbach am Main, Germany
- Date of death: 14 May 2016 (aged 81)
- Height: 1.68 m (5 ft 6 in)
- Position: Striker

Senior career*
Years	Team	Apps	(Gls)
1952–1963	Kickers Offenbach^{(OL Süd)}	275	(101)
1963–1965	TSV 1860 Munich	22	(9)
1965–1967	Kickers Offenbach	33	(6)
Total		330	(116)

International career
1955–1964	West Germany	9	(3)
- * Club domestic league appearances and goals

Engelbert 'Berti' Kraus (30 July 1934 – 14 May 2016) was a German football player. He played in one match at the 1962 FIFA World Cup.
