= Rudolf Zeiser =

German footballer

Personal information
- Date of birth: March 31, 1936
- Date of death: February 4, 1993 (aged 56)
- Height: 1.76 m (5 ft 9 in)
- Positions: Defender; midfielder

Senior career*
Years	Team	Apps	(Gls)
1963–1970	TSV 1860 München	167	(9)
- * Club domestic league appearances and goals as of 16:27, 23 February 2009 (UTC)

Rudolf Zeiser (March 31, 1936 – 4 February 1993) was a German football player. He spent 7 seasons in the Bundesliga with TSV 1860 München.

== Honours ==
- UEFA Cup Winners' Cup finalist: 1965.
- Bundesliga champion: 1966.
- Bundesliga runner-up: 1967.
- DFB-Pokal winner: 1964.
