= Petar Radenković =

Serbian footballer

Personal information
- Date of birth: 1 October 1934 (age 92)
- Place of birth: Belgrade, Kingdom of Yugoslavia
- Height: 1.87 m (6 ft 2 in)
- Position: Goalkeeper

Youth career
- Milicionar
- 1949–1952: Red Star Belgrade

Senior career*
Years	Team	Apps	(Gls)
1952	Red Star Belgrade	1	(0)
1952–1960	OFK Beograd	106	(0)
1961–1962	Wormatia Worms	13	(1)
1962–1970	TSV 1860 Munich	245	(0)
Total		365	(1)

International career
1956	Yugoslavia	3	(0)
Medal record
Men's Football
Representing Yugoslavia
Olympic Games
Silver medal – second place	1956 Melbourne	Team
- * Club domestic league appearances and goals

Petar Radenković (Serbian Cyrillic: Петар Раденковић; born 1 October 1934) is a Serbian retired footballer who played as a goalkeeper. He was capped for the Yugoslavia national team.

== Playing career ==
=== Club ===
He is mostly known for his spell with TSV 1860 Munich in Germany, during which he participated, among others, in the inaugural season of the newly formed Bundesliga. He was suspended for a year after fleeing Yugoslavia in 1960 and had a spell at Wormatia Worms before joining 1860.

=== International ===
Radenković is currently the last living member of the Yugoslavia national football team of the 1956 Summer Olympics. He played two games at that tournament and added his final cap in a friendly match against Indonesia in December that year.

== Musical career ==
Radenković is also known for recording the song Bin i Radi, bin i König (lit. 'I'm Radi, I'm the King') in 1965; the record sold more than 400,000 copies in West Germany. His younger brother Milan Radenković was a musician in the United States. His father was also a singer in the U.S., performing as Rasha (or Rascha) Rodell.

== Personal life ==
Radenković married Yugoslav national basketball team player Olga Borić in June 1955 with whom he had two daughters. Olga died in 2009 and he married Slobodanka in 2014. He also goes by the name Perica and was nicknamed Radi in West Germany.

== Honours ==
TSV 1860 Munich

- Bundesliga: 1965–66
- DFB-Pokal: 1963–64
- European Cup Winner's Cup runner-up: 1964–65
