= Wilfried Kohlars =

German footballer (1939–2019)

Personal information
- Date of birth: 28 October 1939
- Place of birth: Troisdorf, Germany
- Date of death: 5 June 2019 (aged 79)
- Place of death: Munich, Germany
- Height: 1.75 m (5 ft 9 in)
- Positions: Midfielder; striker

Senior career*
Years	Team	Apps	(Gls)
1961–1962	Duisburger SV		
1963–1970	TSV 1860 München	141	(45)
- * Club domestic league appearances and goals

Wilfried Kohlars (28 October 1939 – 5 June 2019) was a German football player. He spent seven seasons in the Bundesliga with TSV 1860 München.

== Honours ==
- UEFA Cup Winners' Cup finalist: 1964–65
- Bundesliga champion: 1965–66
- Bundesliga runner-up: 1966–67
- DFB-Pokal winner: 1963–64
