= Alfred Heiß =

German footballer (born 1940)

Personal information
- Date of birth: 5 December 1940 (age 85)
- Place of birth: Munich, Nazi Germany
- Height: 1.70 m (5 ft 7 in)
- Position: Striker

Senior career*
Years	Team	Apps	(Gls)
1963–1970	TSV 1860 München	169	(40)

International career
1962–1966	West Germany	8	(2)
- * Club domestic league appearances and goals

Alfred 'Fredy' Heiß (born 5 December 1940) is a retired German football player. He spent seven seasons in the Bundesliga with TSV 1860 München. He also represented Germany eight times, including a 1966 FIFA World Cup qualifier against Cyprus (he scored a goal in that game) and seven friendlies.

== Honours ==
- UEFA Cup Winners' Cup finalist: 1964–65
- Bundesliga champion: 1965–66
- Bundesliga runner-up: 1966–67
- DFB-Pokal winner: 1963–64
