= Peter Grosser =

German footballer and coach (1938–2021)

Personal information
- Date of birth: 28 September 1938
- Place of birth: Munich, Bavaria, Germany
- Date of death: 2 March 2021 (aged 82)
- Place of death: Munich, Bavaria, Germany
- Height: 1.73 m (5 ft 8 in)
- Position: Midfielder

Youth career
- 1956–1958: Bayern Munich

Senior career*
Years	Team	Apps	(Gls)
1958–1963	Bayern Munich	134	(65)
1963–1969	1860 Munich	130	(49)
1969–1974	Austria Salzburg	164	(32)
Total		428	(146)

International career
1965–1966	Germany	2	(0)

Managerial career
- 1977–1987: SpVgg Unterhaching
- 1993: SpVgg Unterhaching
- * Club domestic league appearances and goals

Peter Grosser (28 September 1938 – 2 March 2021) was a German football player and coach.

== Club career ==
As a player, he spent six seasons in the Bundesliga with TSV 1860 Munich, captaining the club for the 1965–66 Bundesliga title and scoring 49 goals in 130 West German top-flight appearances.

== International career ==
He also represented Germany on two occasions, in a 1966 FIFA World Cup qualifier against Sweden and in a friendly against Northern Ireland.

== Death ==
Grosser died on 2 March 2021 at the age of 82.

== Honours ==
- UEFA Cup Winners' Cup finalist: 1964–65
- Bundesliga: 1965–66
- DFB-Pokal: 1963–64
