= Hans Rebele =

German footballer (1943–2023)

Personal information
- Date of birth: 26 January 1943
- Place of birth: Munich, Gau Munich-Upper Bavaria, Germany
- Date of death: 4 January 2023 (aged 79)
- Height: 1.75 m (5 ft 9 in)
- Position: Striker

Senior career*
Years	Team	Apps	(Gls)
1961–1969	1860 Munich	130	(23)
1969–1970	MTV München		
1970–1972	1860 Munich		
1972–1975	FC Wacker Innsbruck		

International career
1965, 1969	West Germany	2	(0)
- * Club domestic league appearances and goals

Hans Rebele (26 January 1943 – 4 January 2023) was a German professional footballer who played as a striker. He spent six seasons in the Bundesliga with 1860 Munich. He also represented West Germany in two friendlies.

Rebele died on 4 January 2023, at the age of 79.

== Honours ==
1860 Munich

- UEFA Cup Winners' Cup finalist: 1964–65
- Bundesliga: 1965–66; runner-up: 1966–67
- DFB-Pokal: 1963–64
