= Otto Luttrop =

German football player and manager (1939–2017)

Personal information
- Date of birth: 1 March 1939
- Place of birth: Altenbögge
- Date of death: 21 November 2017 (aged 78)
- Position: Midfielder

Youth career
- 1949–1958: VfL Altenbögge

Senior career*
Years	Team	Apps	(Gls)
1958–1959	VfL Altenbögge		
1959–1963	Westfalia Herne	93	(24)
1963–1966	1860 Munich	81	(11)
1966–1973	Lugano		
1973–1974	FC Sion		
1974–1975	1. FC Mülheim	21	(2)
1975–1976	FC Luzern		
1976–1977	Union Solingen	23	(0)
1977–1978	Chiasso		

Managerial career
- 1971–1974: AC Lugano
- 1974–1975: Chiasso
- 1975–1976: FC Luzern
- 1977–1983: Chiasso
- 1983: Zug 94
- 1983–1985: Lugano
- 1986–1987: 1. FC Saarbrücken
- 1987–1988: FC Olten
- 1988–1989: FC Winterthur
- * Club domestic league appearances and goals

Otto Luttrop (1 March 1939 – 21 November 2017) was a German football player and coach. As a player, he spent three seasons in the Bundesliga with TSV 1860 Munich.

He coached mainly in Switzerland. Luttrop died on 21 November 2017, aged 78.

== Honours ==
1860 Munich

- UEFA Cup Winners' Cup finalist: 1964–65
- Bundesliga: 1965–66
- DFB-Pokal: 1963–64

Lugano

- Swiss Cup: 1967–68

Sion

- Swiss Cup: 1973–74
