= Hans Küppers =

German footballer (1938–2021)

Personal information
- Date of birth: 24 December 1938
- Place of birth: Essen, Germany
- Date of death: 15 December 2021 (aged 82)
- Height: 1.77 m (5 ft 10 in)
- Position: Midfielder

Senior career*
Years	Team	Apps	(Gls)
1957–1961	Schwarz-Weiss Essen		
1961–1968	1860 Munich	120	(47)
1968–1969	1. FC Nürnberg	33	(10)
1969–1971	SV Wattens		
1971–1972	SSW Innsbruck		
1972	FC Lugano		

International career
1962–1967	West Germany	7	(2)
- * Club domestic league appearances and goals

Hans Küppers (24 December 1938 – 15 December 2021) was a German footballer who played as a midfielder. He spent six seasons in the Bundesliga with TSV 1860 Munich and 1. FC Nürnberg. He also represented West Germany seven times, including two UEFA Euro 1968 qualifiers against Yugoslavia and Albania and five friendlies.

Küppers died on 15 December 2021, at the age of 82.

== Honours ==
- UEFA Cup Winners' Cup finalist: 1964–65
- Bundesliga: 1965–66; runner-up 1966–67
- DFB-Pokal: 1958–59, 1963–64
