= 1964–65 European Cup Winners' Cup =

Final positions
- Champions: (England) West Ham United (1st title)
- Runners-up: (West Germany) 1860 Munich

Tournament statistics
- Matches played: 61
- Goals scored: 165 (2.7 per match)
- Top scorer(s): Pierre Kerkhoffs (Lausanne Sports); Václav Mašek (Spartak Praha Sokolovo); Ivan Mráz (Spartak Praha Sokolovo); 6 goals each

The 1964–65 season of the European Cup Winners' Cup club football tournament was won by West Ham United in a final at Wembley Stadium against 1860 Munich. West Ham's Bobby Moore captained a side that also included Geoff Hurst and Martin Peters just one season before all three went on to star in England's World-Cup-winning side of 1966. As a result of their CWC success, Bobby Moore became the only captain to climb the Wembley steps to be presented with three different trophies in three successive seasons (English FA Cup and European Cup Winners' Cup with West Ham in 1964 and 1965 respectively, then the World Cup with England in 1966).

== Teams ==
(Austria) Admira-NÖ Energie Wien (CW)	(Belgium) Gent (CW)	(Bulgaria) Slavia Sofia (CW)	(Cyprus) Anorthosis Famagusta (CW)
(Czechoslovakia) Spartak Praha Sokolovo (CW)	(Denmark) Esbjerg (CW)	(England) West Ham United (CW)	(Finland) Haka (CW)
(France) Lyon (CW)	(East Germany) Aufbau Magdeburg (CW)	(West Germany) 1860 München (CW)	(Greece) AEK Athens (CW)
(Hungary) Budapest Honvéd (2nd)	(Republic of Ireland) Cork Celtic (CR)	(Italy) Torino (CR)	US Luxembourg (CW)
(Malta) Valletta (CW)	(Netherlands) Fortuna '54 (CW)	(Northern Ireland) Derry City (CW)	(Norway) Skeid (CW)
(Poland) Legia Warsaw (CW)	(Portugal) Porto (CR)	(Portugal) Sporting CP (3rd)^{TH}	(Romania) Steaua București (CR)
(Scotland) Dundee (CR)	(Spain) Zaragoza (CW)	(Switzerland) Lausanne Sports (CW)	(Turkey) Galatasaray (CW)
(Wales) Cardiff City (CW)	(Socialist Federal Republic of Yugoslavia) Dinamo Zagreb (CR)		

== Bracket ==
First round
(Norway) Skeid	1	0	1
(Finland) Haka	0	2	2
(Italy) Torino	3	2	5
(Netherlands) Fortuna '54	1	2	3
(Romania) Steaua București	3	2	5
(Northern Ireland) Derry City	0	0	0
(Greece) AEK Athens	2	0	2
(Socialist Federal Republic of Yugoslavia) Dinamo Zagreb	0	3	3
(Austria) Admira-NÖ Energie Wien	1	0	1
(Poland) Legia Warsaw	3	1	4
(East Germany) Aufbau Magdeburg	1	1	2 (1)
(Turkey) Galatasaray (c.t.)	1	1	2 (1)
(Portugal) Porto	3	1	4
(France) Lyon	0	0	0
US Luxembourg	0	0
(West Germany) 1860 München	4	6	10
(Bulgaria) Slavia Sofia	1	2	3
(Republic of Ireland) Cork Celtic	1	0	1
(Switzerland) Lausanne Sports	2	0	2
(Hungary) Budapest Honvéd	0	1	1
(Belgium) Gent	0	1	1
(England) West Ham United	1	1	2
(Czechoslovakia) Spartak Praha Sokolovo	10	6	16
(Cyprus) Anorthosis Famagusta	0	0	0
(Malta) Valletta	0	1	1
(Spain) Zaragoza	3	5	8
(Denmark) Esbjerg	0	0	0
(Wales) Cardiff City	0	1	1

Second round
(Finland) Haka	0	0	0
(Italy) Torino	1	5	6
(Romania) Steaua București	1	0	1
(Socialist Federal Republic of Yugoslavia) Dinamo Zagreb	3	2	5
(Poland) Legia Warsaw	2	0	2 (1)
(Turkey) Galatasaray	1	1	2 (0)
(Portugal) Porto	0	1	1
(West Germany) 1860 München	1	1	2
(Bulgaria) Slavia Sofia	1	1	2 (2)
(Switzerland) Lausanne Sports	0	2	2 (3)
(England) West Ham United	2	1	3
(Czechoslovakia) Spartak Praha Sokolovo	0	2	2
(Scotland) Dundee	2	1	3
(Spain) Zaragoza	2	2	4
(Portugal) Sporting CP	1	0	1
(Wales) Cardiff City	2	0	2

Quarter-finals
(Italy) Torino	1	2	3
(Socialist Federal Republic of Yugoslavia) Dinamo Zagreb	1	1	2
(Poland) Legia Warsaw	0	0	0
(West Germany) 1860 München	4	0	4
(Switzerland) Lausanne Sports	1	3	4
(England) West Ham United	2	4	6
(Spain) Zaragoza	2	1	3
(Wales) Cardiff City	2	0	2

Semi-finals
(Italy) Torino	2	1	3 (0)
(West Germany) 1860 München	0	3	3 (2)
(England) West Ham United	2	1	3
(Spain) Zaragoza	1	1	2

Final
(West Germany) 1860 München	0
(England) West Ham United	2

== First round ==
Team 1	Agg.	Team 2	1st leg	2nd leg	Play-off
Slavia Sofia (Bulgaria)	3–1	(Republic of Ireland) Cork Celtic	1–1	2–0	
Lausanne Sports (Switzerland)	2–1	(Hungary) Budapest Honvéd	2–0	0–1	
Gent (Belgium)	1–2	(England) West Ham United	0–1	1–1	
Spartak Praha Sokolovo (Czechoslovakia)	16–0	(Cyprus) Anorthosis Famagusta	10–0	6–0	
Dundee (Scotland)	Bye		—	—	
Valletta (Malta)	1–8	(Spain) Zaragoza	0–3	1–5	
Sporting CP (Portugal)	Bye		—	—	
Esbjerg (Denmark)	0–1	(Wales) Cardiff City	0–0	0–1	
Skeid (Norway)	1–2	(Finland) Haka	1–0	0–2	
Torino (Italy)	5–3	(Netherlands) Fortuna '54	3–1	2–2	
Steaua București (Romania)	5–0	(Northern Ireland) Derry City	3–0	2–0	
AEK Athens (Greece)	2–3	(Socialist Federal Republic of Yugoslavia) Dinamo Zagreb	2–0	0–3	
Admira-NÖ Energie Wien (Austria)	1–4	(Poland) Legia Warsaw	1–3	0–1	
Aufbau Magdeburg (East Germany)	2–2	(Turkey) Galatasaray	1–1	1–1	1–1 (c)
Porto (Portugal)	4–0	(France) Lyon	3–0	1–0	
Union Luxembourg	0–10	(West Germany) 1860 München	0–4	0–6	

=== First leg ===
30 September 1964

Slavia Sofia (Bulgaria)	1–1	(Republic of Ireland) Cork Celtic
Krastev 54'		Leahy 83'

Vasil Levski National Stadium, Sofia
Referee: Gyula Gere (Hungary)

2 September 1964

Lausanne Sports (Switzerland)	2–0	(Hungary) Budapest Honvéd
Kerkhoffs 62', 70'

Stade Olympique de la Pontaise, Lausanne
Referee: Kurt Tschenscher (West Germany)

23 September 1964

Gent (Belgium)	0–1	(England) West Ham United
		Boyce 52'

Jules Ottenstadion, Ghent
Attendance: 18,000
Referee: Birger Nilsen (Norway)

16 September 1964

Spartak Praha Sokolovo (Czechoslovakia)	10–0	(Cyprus) Anorthosis Famagusta
Mašek 15' (pen.), 32', 49'; Mráz 17', 21', 34', 55', 80'; Steiningel 75'; Kraus 83'

Letná Stadium, Prague
Attendance: 8,981
Referee: Werner Treichel (West Germany)

6 September 1964

Valletta (Malta)	0–3	(Spain) Zaragoza
		Marcelino 16', 48'; Canário 80'

Empire Stadium, Gżira
Referee: Raul Righi (Italy)

9 September 1964

Esbjerg (Denmark)	0–0	(Wales) Cardiff City

Esbjerg Idrætspark, Esbjerg
Referee: Joseph Hannet (Belgium)

15 September 1964

Skeid (Norway)	1–0	(Finland) Haka
Mathisen 38'

Bislett Stadium, Oslo
Referee: Carl W. Hansen (Denmark)

23 September 1964
19:00

Torino (Italy)	3–1	(Netherlands) Fortuna '54
Hitchens 45'; Moschino 50' (pen.); Meroni 63'		Kohn 15'

Stadio Olimpico di Torino, Turin
Attendance: 11,091
Referee: Joseph Heymann (Switzerland)

9 September 1964
15:30

Steaua București (Romania)	3–0	(Northern Ireland) Derry City
Pavlovici 2', 80'; Constantin 68' (pen.)	Report

Stadionul 23 August, Bucharest
Attendance: 60,000
Referee: Alexandros Monastiriotis (Greece)

9 September 1964
16:45

AEK Athens (Greece)	2–0	(Socialist Federal Republic of Yugoslavia) Dinamo Zagreb
Papaioannou 75'; Nestoridis 80'	Report

AEK Stadium, Athens
Attendance: 23,650
Referee: Mihai Popa (Romania)

2 September 1964

Admira-NÖ Energie Wien (Austria)	1–3	(Poland) Legia Warsaw
Kaltenbrunner 69'		Brychczy 12'; Żmijewski 73', 75'

Praterstadion, Vienna
Referee: Erwin Vetter (East Germany)

9 September 1964

Aufbau Magdeburg (East Germany)	1–1	(Turkey) Galatasaray
Heuer 13'		Doğangün 52'

Ernst Grube Stadium, Magdeburg
Referee: Piet Roomer (Netherlands)

16 September 1964

Porto (Portugal)	3–0	(France) Lyon
Custódio Pinto 41', 72'; Carlos Baptista 60'

Estádio das Antas, Porto
Attendance: 18,115
Referee: Daniel Zariquiegi Izco (Spain)

2 September 1964

Union Luxembourg	0–4	(West Germany) 1860 München
		Brunnenmeier 6', 26'; Küppers 12'; Luttrop 81'

Stade Municipal, Luxembourg City
Referee: Josef Stoll (Austria)

=== Second leg ===
7 October 1964

Cork Celtic (Republic of Ireland)	0–2	(Bulgaria) Slavia Sofia
		Mishev 8'; Hristov 86'

Flower Lodge, Cork
Referee: Robert Lacoste (France)

Slavia Sofia won 3–1 on aggregate.

9 September 1964

Budapest Honvéd (Hungary)	1–0	(Switzerland) Lausanne Sports
Vági 27'

Népstadion, Budapest
Referee: Alojz Obtulovič (Czechoslovakia)

Lausanne Sports won 2–1 on aggregate.

7 October 1964

West Ham United (England)	1–1	(Belgium) Gent
Byrne 43'		Peters 32' (o.g.)

Boleyn Ground, London
Attendance: 24,000
Referee: Erling Rolf Olsen (Norway)

West Ham United won 2–1 on aggregate.

20 September 1964

Anorthosis Famagusta (Cyprus)	0–6	(Czechoslovakia) Spartak Praha Sokolovo
		Vrána 36'; Kraus 40', 84'; Dyba 67'; Mašek 82', 90'

Plzeň City Stadium, Plzeň
Attendance: 9,514
Referee: Wacław Majdan (Poland)

Spartak Praha Sokolovo won 16–0 on aggregate.

14 October 1964

Zaragoza (Spain)	5–1	(Malta) Valletta
Martínez 2', 27', 85'; Marcelino 17'; Santos 53'		Gauci 29'

La Romareda, Zaragoza
Referee: Iginio Rigato (Italy)

Zaragoza won 8–1 on aggregate.

13 October 1964

Cardiff City (Wales)	1–0	(Denmark) Esbjerg
King 57'

Ninian Park, Cardiff
Referee: Joseph Hannet (Belgium)

Cardiff City won 1–0 on aggregate.

7 October 1964

Haka (Finland)	2–0	(Norway) Skeid
Paimander 67'; Peltonen 81'

Tehtaan kenttä, Valkeakoski
Referee: Vagn Sørensen (Denmark)

Haka won 2–1 on aggregate.

7 October 1964

Fortuna '54 (Netherlands)	2–2	(Italy) Torino
Van Rijn 14'; Beeren 83'		Hitchens 5'; Brüll 8' (o.g.)

Mauritsstadion, Geleen
Attendance: 10,523
Referee: Daniel Mellet (Switzerland)

Torino won 5–3 on aggregate.

16 September 1964
15:00

Derry City (Northern Ireland)	0–2	(Romania) Steaua București
	Report	Creiniceanu 48', 57'

Brandywell Stadium, Derry
Attendance: 7,426
Referee: George McCabe (England)

Steaua București won 5–0 on aggregate.

16 September 1964
17:00

Dinamo Zagreb (Socialist Federal Republic of Yugoslavia)	3–0	(Greece) AEK Athens
Lamza 45+1'; Zambata 50'; Jerković 57'	Report

Stadion Maksimir, Zagreb
Attendance: 10,418
Referee: Petre Sotir (Romania)

Dinamo Zagreb won 3–2 on aggregate.

23 September 1964

Legia Warsaw (Poland)	1–0	(Austria) Admira-NÖ Energie Wien
Brychczy 11'

Polish Army Stadium, Warsaw
Referee: Helmut Köhler (East Germany)

Legia Warsaw won 4–1 on aggregate.

17 September 1964

Galatasaray (Turkey)	1–1	(East Germany) Aufbau Magdeburg
Köken 26'		Heuer 74'

Ali Sami Yen Stadium, Istanbul
Referee: Vladimir Stanković (Yugoslavia)

Galatasaray 2–2 Aufbau Magdeburg on aggregate.

14 October 1964

(France) Lyon	0–1	Porto (Portugal)
		Valdir 89'

Stade de Gerland, Lyon
Attendance: 19,162
Referee: Juan Gardeazábal (Spain)

Porto won 4–0 on aggregate.

9 September 1964

(West Germany) 1860 München	6–0	Union Luxembourg
Brunnenmeier 11', 46'; Luttrop 54'; Rebele 60', 74'; Grosser 69'

Stadion an der Grünwalder Straße, Munich
Referee: Eduard Babauczek (Austria)

1860 München won 10–0 on aggregate.

=== Play-off ===
7 October 1964

Galatasaray (Turkey)	1–1 (a.e.t.)	(East Germany) Aufbau Magdeburg
Oktay 81'		Klingbiel 62'

Hohe Warte Stadium, Vienna
Referee: Alfred Haberfellner (Austria)

1–1 in play-off match. Galatasaray qualified on a coin toss.

== Second round ==
Team 1	Agg.	Team 2	1st leg	2nd leg	Play-off
Slavia Sofia (Bulgaria)	2–2	(Switzerland) Lausanne Sports	1–0	1–2	2–3
West Ham United (England)	3–2	(Czechoslovakia) Spartak Praha Sokolovo	2–0	1–2	
Dundee (Scotland)	3–4	(Spain) Zaragoza	2–2	1–2	
Sporting CP (Portugal)	1–2	(Wales) Cardiff City	1–2	0–0	
Haka (Finland)	0–6	(Italy) Torino	0–1	0–5	
Steaua București (Romania)	1–5	(Socialist Federal Republic of Yugoslavia) Dinamo Zagreb	1–3	0–2	
Legia Warsaw (Poland)	2–2	(Turkey) Galatasaray	2–1	0–1	1–0
Porto (Portugal)	1–2	(West Germany) 1860 München	0–1	1–1	

=== First leg ===
18 November 1964

Slavia Sofia (Bulgaria)	1–0	(Switzerland) Lausanne Sports
Vasilev 50'

Vasil Levski National Stadium, Sofia
Referee: Paul Bonett (Malta)

25 November 1964

West Ham United (England)	2–0	(Czechoslovakia) Spartak Praha Sokolovo
Bond 58'; Sealey 82'

Boleyn Ground, London
Attendance: 27,950
Referee: José María Ortiz de Mendíbil (Spain)

18 November 1964

Dundee (Scotland)	2–2	(Spain) Zaragoza
Murray 2'; Houston 89'		Santos 23'; Villa 26'

Dens Park, Dundee
Referee: Andries van Leeuwen (Netherlands)

16 December 1964

Sporting CP (Portugal)	1–2	(Wales) Cardiff City
Figueiredo 81'		Farrell 31'; Tapscott 65'

Estádio José Alvalade, Lisbon
Referee: Rudolf Kreitlein (West Germany)

11 November 1964

Haka (Finland)	0–1	(Italy) Torino
		Albrigi 20'

Tehtaan kenttä, Valkeakoski
Attendance: 2,023
Referee: Samuel Carswell (Northern Ireland)

9 December 1964
15:30

Steaua București (Romania)	1–3	(Socialist Federal Republic of Yugoslavia) Dinamo Zagreb
Raksi 20'	Report	Matuš 35'; Pavić 61'; Kobeščak 87'

Stadionul 23 August, Bucharest
Attendance: 12,676
Referee: Zdenek Vales (Czechoslovakia)

18 November 1964

Legia Warsaw (Poland)	2–1	(Turkey) Galatasaray
Gmoch 69', 88'		Oktay 73'

Polish Army Stadium, Warsaw
Referee: Gábor Soós (Hungary)

2 December 1964

Porto (Portugal)	0–1	(West Germany) 1860 München
		Heiß 60'

Estádio das Antas, Porto
Attendance: 11,643
Referee: Joseph Barbéran (France)

=== Second leg ===
6 December 1964

Lausanne Sports (Switzerland)	2–1	(Bulgaria) Slavia Sofia
Kerkhoffs 7'; Hosp 43'		Krastev 20'

Stade Olympique de la Pontaise, Lausanne
Referee: Antonio Sbardella (Italy)

Lausanne Sports 2–2 Slavia Sofia on aggregate.

9 December 1964

Spartak Praha Sokolovo (Czechoslovakia)	2–1	(England) West Ham United
Mašek 68'; Mraz 88'		Sissons 14'

Letná Stadium, Prague
Attendance: 45,000
Referee: Kostadin Dinov (Bulgaria)

West Ham United won 3–2 on aggregate.

8 December 1964

Zaragoza (Spain)	2–1	(Scotland) Dundee
Lapetra 40', 42'		Robertson 18'

La Romareda, Zaragoza
Referee: Francesco Francescon (Italy)

Zaragoza won 4–3 on aggregate.

23 December 1964

Cardiff City (Wales)	0–0	(Portugal) Sporting CP

Ninian Park, Cardiff
Referee: Robert Schaut (Belgium)

Cardiff City won 2–1 on aggregate.

6 December 1964
14:30

Torino (Italy)	5–0	(Finland) Haka
Simoni 6'; Hitchens 9'; Meroni 33', 59'; Puia 61'

Stadio Olimpico di Torino, Turin
Attendance: 6,500
Referee: Dittmar Huber (Switzerland)

Torino won 6–0 on aggregate.

16 December 1964
15:30

Dinamo Zagreb (Socialist Federal Republic of Yugoslavia)	2–0	(Romania) Steaua București
Pavić 2'; Ramljak 62'	Report

Stadion Maksimir, Zagreb
Attendance: 5,784
Referee: Rudi Glöckner (East Germany)

Dinamo Zagreb won 5–1 on aggregate.

3 December 1964

Galatasaray (Turkey)	1–0	(Poland) Legia Warsaw
Oktay 22'

Ali Sami Yen Stadium, Istanbul
Referee: Franz Mayer (Austria)

Galatasaray 2–2 Legia Warsaw on aggregate.

16 December 1964

1860 München (West Germany)	1–1	(Portugal) Porto
Heiß 37'		Valdir 44'

Stadion an der Grünwalder Straße, Munich
Attendance: 36,430
Referee: Konstantin Zečević (Yugoslavia)

1860 München won 2–1 on aggregate.

=== Play-off ===
10 December 1964

Legia Warsaw (Poland)	1–0	(Turkey) Galatasaray
Apostel 14'

Stadionul August 23, Bucharest
Referee: Nicolae Mihăilescu (Romania)

Legia Warsaw won 1–0 in a play-off.

29 December 1964

Lausanne Sports (Switzerland)	3–2	(Bulgaria) Slavia Sofia
Eschmann 30'; Kerkhoffs 35', 80'		Hristov 15'; Gugalov 70'

Stadio Flaminio, Rome
Referee: Antonio Sbardella (Italy)

Lausanne Sports won 3–2 in a play-off.

== Quarter-finals ==
Team 1	Agg.	Team 2	1st leg	2nd leg
Lausanne Sports (Switzerland)	4–6	(England) West Ham United	1–2	3–4
Zaragoza (Spain)	3–2	(Wales) Cardiff City	2–2	1–0
Torino (Italy)	3–2	(Socialist Federal Republic of Yugoslavia) Dinamo Zagreb	1–1	2–1
Legia Warsaw (Poland)	0–4	(West Germany) 1860 Munich	0–4	0–0

=== First leg ===
16 March 1965

Lausanne Sport (Switzerland)	1–2	(England) West Ham United
Hosp 80'		Dear 21'; Byrne 53'

Stade Olympique de la Pontaise, Lausanne
Attendance: 20,000
Referee: Paul Schiller (Austria)

20 January 1965

Zaragoza (Spain)	2–2	(Wales) Cardiff City
Lapetra 2'; Pais 10'		Williams 15'; King 38'

La Romareda, Zaragoza
Referee: Dittmar Huber (Switzerland)

3 March 1965

Torino (Italy)	1–1	(Socialist Federal Republic of Yugoslavia) Dinamo Zagreb
Simoni 43'		Lamza 48'

Stadio Olimpico di Torino, Turin
Attendance: 5,000
Referee: Günther Baumgärtel (West Germany)

3 March 1965

Legia Warsaw (Poland)	0–4	(West Germany) 1860 Munich
		Grosser 69'; Küppers 73'; Heiß 75', 87'

Polish Army Stadium, Warsaw
Referee: John Adair (Northern Ireland)

=== Second leg ===
23 March 1965

West Ham United (England)	4–3	(Switzerland) Lausanne Sport
Tacchella 42' (o.g.); Dear 43', 89'; Peters 59'		Kerkhoffs 37'; Hertig 48'; Eschmann 80'

Boleyn Ground, London
Attendance: 31,780
Referee: Piet Roomer (Netherlands)

West Ham United won 6–4 on aggregate.

3 February 1965

Cardiff City (Wales)	0–1	(Spain) Zaragoza
		Canário 75'

Ninian Park, Cardiff
Referee: André Hauben (Belgium)

Zaragoza won 3–2 on aggregate.

17 March 1965

Dinamo Zagreb (Socialist Federal Republic of Yugoslavia)	1–2	(Italy) Torino
Jerković 81'		Poletti 1'; Hitchens 44'

Stadion Maksimir, Zagreb
Attendance: 35,000
Referee: József Fehérvári (Hungary)

Torino won 3–2 on aggregate.

17 March 1965

1860 Munich (West Germany)	0–0	(Poland) Legia Warsaw

Stadion an der Grünwalder Straße, Munich
Attendance: Stjepan Varaždinec (Yugoslavia)

1860 Munich won 4–0 on aggregate.

== Semi-finals ==
Team 1	Agg.	Team 2	1st leg	2nd leg	Play-off
West Ham United (England)	3–2	(Spain) Zaragoza	2–1	1–1	N/A
Torino (Italy)	3–3	(West Germany) 1860 Munich	2–0	1–3	0–2

=== First leg ===
7 April 1965
19:30

West Ham United (England)	2–1	(Spain) Zaragoza
Dear 8'; Byrne 23'	Report Report 2	Canário 54'

Boleyn Ground, London
Attendance: 34,864
Referee: Robert Lacoste (France)

20 April 1965

Torino (Italy)	2–0	(West Germany) 1860 Munich
Rosato 9'; Luttrop 41' (o.g.)	Report Report 2

Stadio Olimpico di Torino, Turin
Attendance: 18,254
Referee: Alfred Haberfellner (Austria)

=== Second leg ===
28 April 1965
20:00

Zaragoza (Spain)	1–1	(England) West Ham United
Lapetra 22'	Report Report 2	Sissons 54'

La Romareda, Zaragoza
Attendance: 29,400
Referee: Leo Horn (Netherlands)

West Ham United won 3–2 on aggregate.

27 April 1965

1860 Munich (West Germany)	3–1	(Italy) Torino
Luttrop 12', 52' (pen.); Heiß 25'	Report Report 2	Lancioni 74'

Grünwalder Stadion, Munich
Attendance: 42,931
Referee: Zdeněk Valeš (Czechoslovakia)

1860 Munich 3–3 Torino on aggregate.

=== Play-off ===
5 May 1965

1860 Munich (West Germany)	2–0	(Italy) Torino
Rebele 60'; Luttrop 90' (pen.)	Report Report 2

Letzigrund, Zürich
Attendance: 25,586
Referee: Dittmar Huber (Switzerland)

1860 Munich won 2–0 in a play-off.

== Final ==
19 May 1965
19:30

1860 Munich (West Germany)	0–2	(England) West Ham United
	Report Report 2	Sealey 70', 72'

Wembley Stadium, London
Attendance: 97,974
Referee: István Zsolt (Hungary)

== Top scorers ==
The top scorers from the 1964–65 European Cup Winners' Cup (including preliminary round) are as follows:

Rank	Name	Team	Goals
1	(Netherlands) Pierre Kerkhoffs	(Switzerland) Lausanne Sports	6
1	(Czechoslovakia) Václav Mašek	(Czechoslovakia) Spartak Praha Sokolovo	6
1	(Czechoslovakia) Ivan Mráz	(Czechoslovakia) Spartak Praha Sokolovo	6
4	(West Germany) Alfred Heiß	(West Germany) 1860 München	5
4	(West Germany) Otto Luttrop	(West Germany) 1860 München	5
6	(West Germany) Rudolf Brunnenmeier	(West Germany) 1860 München	4
6	(England) Brian Dear	(England) West Ham United	4
6	(England) Gerry Hitchens	(Italy) Torino	4
6	(Spain) Carlos Lapetra	(Spain) Zaragoza	4

== See also ==
- 1964–65 European Cup
- 1964–65 Inter-Cities Fairs Cup
