= 1963–64 DFB-Pokal =

Tournament details
- Country: West Germany
- Teams: 32

Final positions
- Champions: 1860 Munich
- Runner-up: Eintracht Frankfurt

Tournament statistics
- Matches played: 34
- Goals scored: 124 (3.65 per match)
- Top goal scorer(s): Rudolf Brunnenmeier (1860 Munich) (5)

The 1963–64 DFB-Pokal was the 21st season of the annual German football cup competition. It began on 7 April 1964 and ended on 13 June 1964. 32 teams competed in the tournament of five rounds. In the final 1860 Munich defeated Eintracht Frankfurt 2–0.

== Matches ==
=== First round ===
7 April 1964
Hamburger SV	1 – 1	SpVgg Fürth	(AET)
Meidericher SV	1 – 2	Hertha BSC	(AET)
VfL Wolfsburg	0 – 2	Eintracht Frankfurt
VfR Wormatia Worms	2 – 3	KSV Hessen Kassel
Stuttgarter Kickers	0 – 3	Phönix Ludwigshafen
SV Werder Bremen	0 – 2	FC Schalke 04
1. FC Köln	3 – 2	1. FC Nürnberg	(AET)
Eintracht Trier	1 – 1	Hannover 96	(AET)
Altonaer FC 93	2 – 1	Borussia Mönchengladbach
Eintracht Gelsenkirchen	0 – 2	Duisburger SV
Preußen Münster	1 – 3	Karlsruher SC
1. FC Saarbrücken	6 – 1	Tennis Borussia Berlin
Eintracht Braunschweig	3 – 0	VfL Osnabrück
TSV 1860 München	2 – 0	Borussia Dortmund
1. FC Kaiserslautern	2 – 0	Wuppertaler SV Borussia
VfB Stuttgart	2 – 2	SSV Reutlingen	(AET)

==== Replays ====
15 April 1964
SpVgg Fürth	2 – 1	Hamburger SV	(AET)
Hannover 96	4 – 0	Eintracht Trier
SSV Reutlingen	0 – 4	VfB Stuttgart

=== Round of 16 ===
22 April 1964
Eintracht Frankfurt	6 – 1	KSV Hessen Kassel
Phönix Ludwigshafen	1 – 2	FC Schalke 04
Hertha BSC	4 – 3	SpVgg Fürth
1. FC Köln	3 – 0	Hannover 96	(AET)
Altonaer FC 93	2 – 1	Duisburger SV
1. FC Saarbrücken	2 – 1	Eintracht Braunschweig	(AET)
TSV 1860 München	4 – 2	1. FC Kaiserslautern
2 May 1964
Karlsruher SC	2 – 1	VfB Stuttgart

=== Quarter-finals ===
20 May 1964
Eintracht Frankfurt	2 – 1	FC Schalke 04
Hertha BSC	4 – 2	1. FC Köln
Altonaer FC 93	2 – 1	Karlsruher SC
1. FC Saarbrücken	1 – 3	TSV 1860 München

=== Semi-finals ===
3 June 1964

Eintracht Frankfurt	3–1	Hertha BSC
Trimhold 44'; Stinka 56'; Schämer 77'	Report	Rehhagel 73' (pen.)

Waldstadion, Frankfurt
Attendance: 30,000
Referee: Fritz (Oggersheim)

3 June 1964

Altonaer FC 93	1–4 (a.e.t.)	TSV 1860 München
Kautz 72'	Report	Kraus 85'; Luttrop 94'; Brunnenmeier 100'; Küppers 109'

Adolf-Jäger-Kampfbahn, Hamburg
Attendance: 15,000
Referee: Malka (Herten)

=== Final ===
13 June 1964
16:00 CET

Eintracht Frankfurt	0–2	1860 Munich
	Report	Kohlars 43'; Brunnenmeier 63'

Neckarstadion, Stuttgart
Attendance: 45,000
Referee: Johannes Malka (Herten)
