= TSV 1860 Munich =

German sports club

Coordinates: 48°6′7.1″N 11°33′55.1″E

1860 Munich
- Full name: Turn- und Sportverein München von 1860 e. V.
- Nicknames: Die Löwen (The Lions); Sechzig (Sixty); Die Sechzger (The Sixties); Weiß und Blau (White and Blue); Die Blauen (The Blues)
- Founded: 17 May 1860; 166 years ago, football on 6 March 1899; 127 years ago
- Ground: Grünwalder Stadion
- Capacity: 15,000
- President: Gernot Mang
- Head coach: Alper Kayabunar
- League: Regionalliga Bayern
- 2025–26: 3. Liga, 8th of 20 (relegated)
- Website: www.tsv1860.de
Home colours	Away colours	Third colours

Turn- und Sportverein München von 1860, commonly known as TSV 1860 Munich (German pronunciation: [ˌteːʔɛsˈfaʊ ˌʔaxtseːnˈhʊndɐt ˈzɛçtsɪç ˈmʏnçn̩]; sechzig locally [ˈzɛçtsɪk]; lettered as Achtzehnhundertsechzig München) or 1860 Munich, is a sports club based in Munich. The club's football team plays in the Regionalliga Bayern, the fourth tier of the German football pyramid. Their current home ground is the Grünwalder Stadion, having first moved there in 1911 and spent much of their history there.

The sports club was established in its current form in 1860, adding a football department in 1899. 1860 emerged as a competitive force during the 1920s and 1930s, capturing the 1942 Tschammerpokal (now DFB-Pokal). Unlike local rivals Bayern Munich, they were a founding member of the Bundesliga in 1963 and subsequently enjoyed a golden era. They won the 1964 DFB-Pokal, the 1966 Bundesliga and finished as league runners-up in 1967.

Relegations and financial instability have defined the club's history since 1970, including a drop to amateur football in 1982 and a financial crisis in 2017. A brief revival saw them return to the Bundesliga in the 1990s, peaking with a fourth-place finish in 2000 and UEFA competition appearances. Mounting debt and a 16th-place finish in the 2016–17 2. Bundesliga led to investor Hasan Ismaik refusing to pay for their 3. Liga license. Despite administrative relegation to the fourth tier, they achieved 3. Liga promotion the following season. 1860 stayed in the 3. Liga until further financial instability caused the denial of a 3. Liga license for the 2026-27 season and another administrative relegation.

1860 Munich are nicknamed Die Löwen (The Lions) and Die Blauen (The Blues), having played in sky-blue kits for most of their history. Their longest-standing and fiercest rivalry is with Bayern Munich, against whom they contest the Munich derby. 1860 shared Grünwalder with Bayern from 1925 to 1972, when both clubs moved to the Olympiastadion. The following decades saw 1860 switch between the two grounds several times. In 2005, Bayern and 1860 moved to the newly built Allianz Arena. Bayern terminated 1860's rental agreement following their 2017 relegation, after which they returned to Grünwalder.

== History ==
=== Origins of the club ===
The roots of the TSV's founding as a physical fitness and gymnastics association go back to a meeting held 15 July 1848 in a local pub, Buttlesche Brauerei zum Bayerischen Löwen. It was a time of revolutionary foment due to the 1848 Revolutions, and the club was banned in 1849 by the Bavarian monarchy for "republican activities". The club was formally reestablished on 17 May 1860 and after mergers with a number of other local associations in 1862 was known as Turnverein München. A football department was created on 6 March 1899 and played its first matches against other squads three years later. On 13 March 1880 the club officially adopted the lion on their crest and the nickname Die Löwen (the Lions).

=== 1900–1945 ===
In 1919 was renamed TSV München 1860. By the mid-1920s, they were playing football in the country's upper leagues, like the Bezirksliga Bayern, making a national semi-final appearance in 1927. Die Löwen challenged for the championship in 1931, but lost a 3–2 decider to Hertha BSC. Two years later, they made another semi-final appearance which they lost to Schalke 04.

After Adolf Hitler took power in 1933, German football was re-organized under the Third Reich into 16 top-flight divisions known as Gauligen. In opposition to their rivals Bayern Munich, TSV had affinities to Nazism even before 1933 and Nazi personnel took most high ranking positions at the club.TSV joined the Gauliga Bayern where they earned second-place finishes in 1934, 1938, and 1939 before finally winning a division championship in 1941. Their subsequent play-off appearance saw them finish second in their pool to finalist Rapid Wien. The following season they did not advance to the national play-off rounds, but did earn their first major honours by defeating Schalke 04 to win the Tschammerpokal, known today as the DFB-Pokal. TSV returned to the national play-offs again in 1943, progressing to the quarter-finals.

=== Post war ===
After World War II, 1860 played in the top flight Oberliga Süd as a mid-table side, but were relegated in 1955–56 after finishing last. 1860 returned to the Oberliga Süd in 1957–58 where they stayed until winning the league championship in 1963. By becoming champions, 1860 gained automatic entry into Germany's new professional league, the Bundesliga, ahead of rivals Bayern Munich, who would have to wait two seasons for their own top flight debut since the German Football Association (DFB) did not want two teams from the same city in the new league. Through the mid-1960s, 1860 won their second DFB-Pokal in 1964 and played the 1965 European Cup Winners' Cup final against West Ham United – losing 2–0. In 1966, they came away as Bundesliga champions and qualified for the 1966–67 European Cup, but lost 3–2 on aggregate against Real Madrid in the second round. On 3 June 1967, they finished as runner-up in the Bundesliga.

=== The 1970s, 1980s and 1990s ===
Those performances were followed by poor showings in three consecutive seasons leading to relegation in 1970 to the Regionalliga Süd (II). It took 1860 seven years to make their way back to the first division, through a three-game play-off contest with Arminia Bielefeld, only to be immediately relegated again. One year later they were back, this time for a two-year stay, then in 1982 they were relegated once again, and then forced into the tier III Amateur Oberliga Bayern when financial problems led to the club being denied a licence.

The club was promoted back to the Bundesliga for the 1994–95 season, going on to finish 14th, narrowly missing out on relegation. President Karl-Heinz Wildmoser and manager Werner Lorant, however, made several purchases to improve the team's performances, including striker Olaf Bodden, winger Harald Cerny, attacking midfielder Daniel Borimirov, playmaker Peter Nowak and defensive stoppers Miroslav Stević, Jens Jeremies and Manfred Schwabl. Other players who joined 1860's squad during this time included like Abedi Pele, Thomas Häßler and Davor Šuker.

=== 2000s ===
Under the leadership of Wildmoser and Lorant, the combination of proven veterans and young talent helped the club avoid relegation and become a decent mid-table side. In 2000, 1860 finished fourth in the Bundesliga and as a result played in the UEFA Champions League Third qualifying round, where they faced Leeds United. A 3–1 aggregate defeat, however, saw 1860 play in the UEFA Cup that season, advancing to the third round, where they were eliminated by Parma. After nine years at 1860, Lorant was dismissed by the club following a 1–5 derby defeat to Bayern Munich on 13 October 2001.

After a decade in the top division, 1860 finished the 2003–04 season in 17th-place that returned the club to the 2. Bundesliga. Wildmoser made the controversial decision to groundshare with rivals Bayern Munich in the Allianz Arena, a move that outraged fans and led to accusations of a sell-out. His downfall came when he and his son Karl-Heinz Wildmoser Jr. were caught in a bribery scandal around the awarding procedure for the contract to build the stadium.

In addition to closely being relegated to the Regionalliga Süd (III) in the 2005–06 season, 1860 experienced severe financial difficulties. Stadium partner Bayern Munich bought out TSV's 50% interest in the Allianz Arena in late April 2006 for €11 million, providing the club with some immediate financial relief. Following this move, the DFB was satisfied with the financial health of the club and duly issued 1860 a licence to play in the 2. Bundesliga for the 2006–07 season.

TSV hired several new managers during the club's time in 2. Bundesliga period. The first was Rudi Bommer, followed by Reiner Maurer, Walter Schachner, Marco Kurz and Uwe Wolf. Also, former Germany national team player Stefan Reuter as a general manager. None of the new managers, however, could lead the squad back to the top-flight Bundesliga. Ewald Lienen was manager of 1860 from 13 May 2009 to the end of the 2009–10 season.

=== 2010–present ===
Reiner Maurer was hired as manager of 1860 at the start of the 2010–11 season.

1860 came close to insolvency for a second time in five years in 2011 when it needed €8 million to survive. Help was offered to the club by local rival Bayern Munich, to the disgust of the supporters of each club, since Bayern was to lose €50 million in future stadium rent if the club defaulted on its rental contract obligations until 2025. Eventually, the club was rescued by Jordanian investor Hasan Abdullah Ismaik, who, for €18 million, purchased 60% of the club's professional team's operating company, 1860 GmbH & Co. KGaA'. However his voting rights being restricted to 49% due to regulations governing German football, which is based around membership-led clubs and not entrepreneurial. H. I. Squared International, a company controlled by Ismaik, took over the marketing of the club from IMG.

The 2014–15 season saw the club finish 16th in the 2. Bundesliga. This meant a place in the relegation play-offs against Holstein Kiel, during which it retained its league place with a 2–1 home win after a 0–0 draw in the first leg. 1860 survived courtesy of an injury time goal by defender Kai Bülow in front of 57,000 spectators in Munich.

In 2016–17, the team finished 16th in the 2. Bundesliga after a 1–2 defeat against 1. FC Heidenheim in the last game of the season. They played 1–1 and 0–2 respectively in the following relegation play-off against Jahn Regensburg and were therefore officially relegated. Managing director Ian Ayre and President Peter Cassalette resigned from their positions the following day. On 2 June 2017, it was announced that 1860 were unable to obtain a 3. Liga licence for the 2017–18 season as a result of investor Hassan Ismaik's unwillingness to pay the necessary fees. As a result, the club was relegated to the Regionalliga Bayern for the 2017–18 season.

They spent only one season in the Regionalliga as they won the league in 2017–18, thus securing their return to the 3. Liga. Their first season back in the third league saw them finish 12th. The team managed to reach 4th place in the 2020–21 and 2021–22 season, one position away from promotion play-offs spot. The team also qualified for the 2021–22 DFB-Pokal and 2022–23 DFB-Pokal competitions as a result of the 4th-place finishes.

In June 2026, 1860 again failed to receive a license from the DFB to compete in 3. Liga for the 2026-27 season. They were administratively relegated to the Regionalliga Bayern for the 2026–27 season. Following this, the club terminated its 15-year cooperation agreement with Hasan Ismaik. This triggered legal battles as Ismaik attempted to sue the club back into professional football.

== Reserve team ==
The TSV 1860 Munich second team, (previously, until 2005, the TSV 1860 Munich Amateure), have historically recorded success at the Bavarian level.

The second team struggled during the club's years outside professional football, but rose through the ranks again after the club's revival in the early 1990s and returned to the Bayernliga in 1996, winning the title in its first season there and promotion to the third-tier Regionalliga Süd. The team was relegated to the Bayernliga in 2001, and returned to the Regionalliga Süd in 2004. TSV 1860 Munich II missed out on 3. Liga qualification in the 2007–08 season, and again in the 2012–13 season when it won the newly formed Regionalliga Bayern but lost to SV Elversberg in the promotion round. Because the first team was relegated to Regionalliga Bayern for the 2017–18 season, the reserve team was relegated to the fifth-tier Bayernliga Süd.

The club is the only one in Bavaria to have won the Bayernliga with its first and second team.

== Ground ==
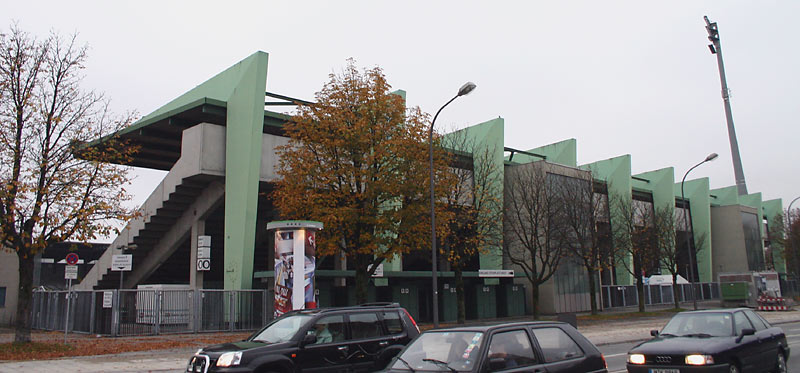
Grünwalder Stadion (1911–1995, 2004–2005, 2017–present)

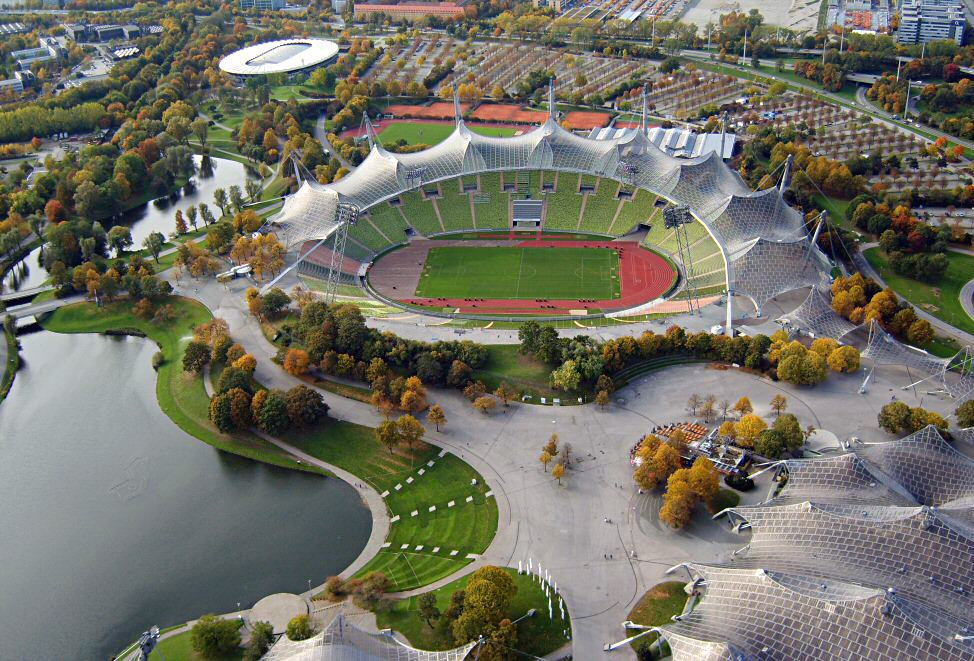
Olympiastadion (1972–2004)

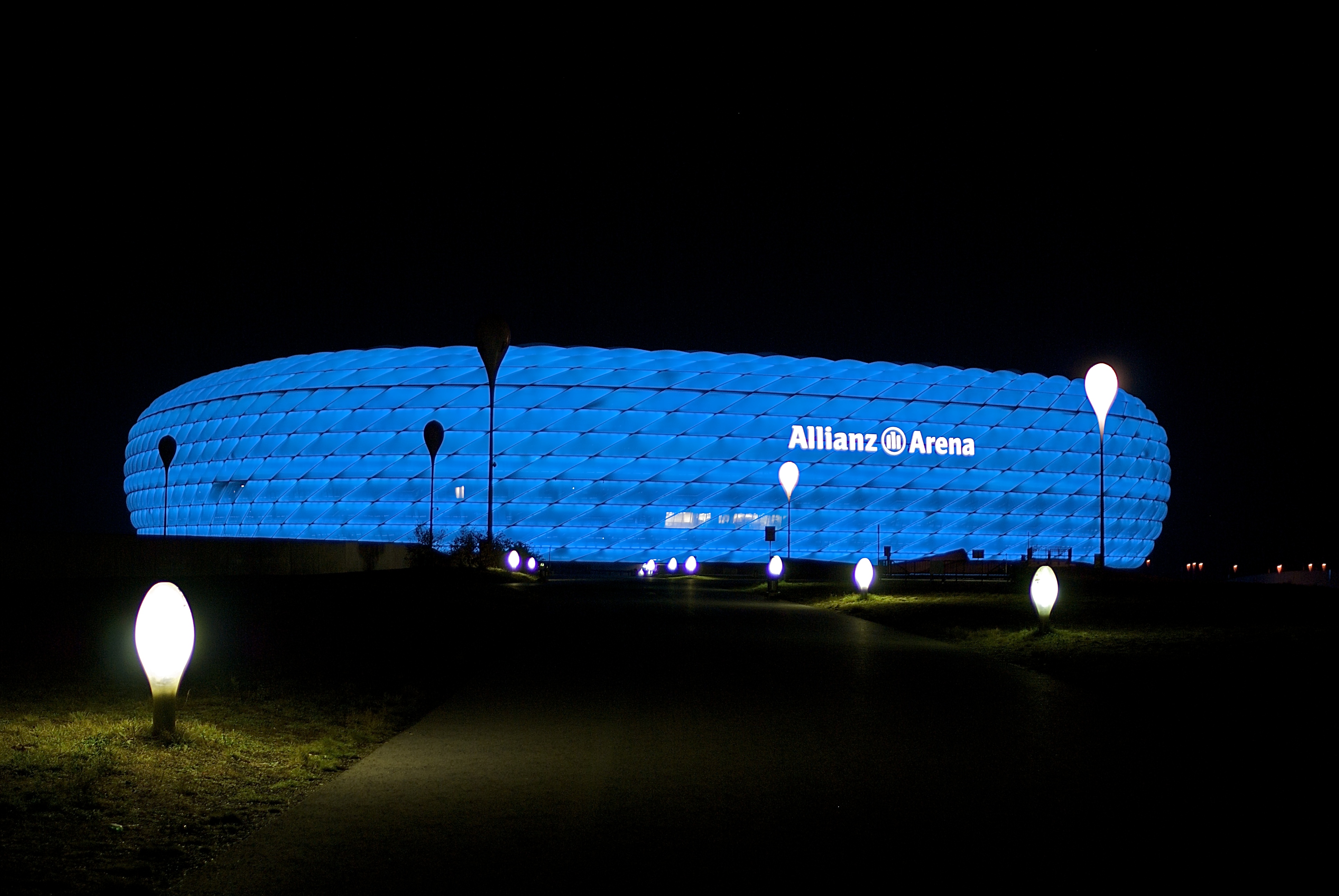
Allianz Arena (2005–2017)

Originally, 1860 Munich played their home matches in the Stadion an der Grünwalderstraße (commonly known as Sechzgerstadion, which means "60er Stadium"). They shared this venue, built in 1911, with city rivals Bayern Munich between 1925 and 1972. Both clubs then moved to the new Olympiastadion built for the 1972 Olympic Games. 1860 Munich moved back to the old ground several times from 1972 on, with the years between 1982 and 1995 being the longest period. In the 2004–05 season, 1860 again played at Sechzger, as the Allianz Arena was being readied.

From 2005 to 2017, 1860 Munich played their home matches in the Allianz Arena, which they shared—and until 2006 co-owned—with Bayern Munich. The arena's usual peach lighting was changed to 1860's blue when the team played. The club's inaugural game at the Allianz Arena was a friendly played against 1. FC Nürnberg on 30 May 2005. On 28 April 2006, 1860 sold its 50% share to Bayern Munich to help resolve a serious financial crisis that saw 1860 facing bankruptcy. On 12 July 2017, Bayern Munich terminated 1860 Munich's rental agreement for Allianz Arena. The club returned to their old stadium, the Grünwalder Stadion.

== Season-by-season performance ==
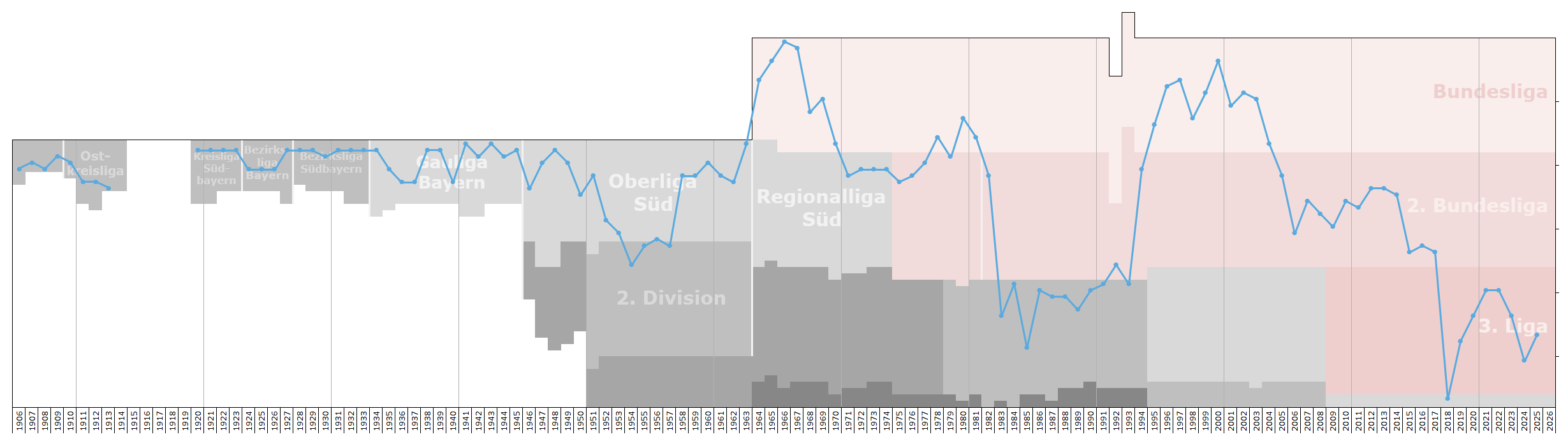
Historical chart of 1860 München league performance

Year	Division	Position	Average Home Attendance
1963–64	1. Bundesliga (I)	7th	31,949
1964–65	1. Bundesliga (I)	4th	26,765
1965–66	1. Bundesliga (I)	1st	29,316
1966–67	1. Bundesliga (I)	2nd	23,621
1967–68	1. Bundesliga (I)	12th	19,611
1968–69	1. Bundesliga (I)	10th	16,012
1969–70	1. Bundesliga (I)	17th ↓	14,923
1977–78	1. Bundesliga (I)	16th ↓	28,904
1979–80	1. Bundesliga (I)	13th	28,067
1980–81	1. Bundesliga (I)	16th ↓	23,805
1988–89	Bayernliga (III)	5th	NA
1989–90	Bayernliga	2nd	NA
1990–91	Bayernliga	1st ↑	NA
1991–92	2. Bundesliga (II)	10th ↓	15,968
1992–93	Bayernliga (III)	1st ↑	NA
1993–94	2. Bundesliga (II)	3rd ↑	19,184
1994–95	Bundesliga (I)	14th	23,140
1995–96	Bundesliga	8th	32,105
1996–97	Bundesliga	7th	34,648
1997–98	Bundesliga	13th	29,348
1998–99	Bundesliga	9th	28,417
1999–00	Bundesliga	4th	27,282
2000–01	Bundesliga	11th	25,276
2001–02	Bundesliga	9th	26,024
2002–03	Bundesliga	10th	26,518
2003–04	Bundesliga	17th ↓	28,331
2004–05	2. Bundesliga (II)	4th	20,140
2005–06	2. Bundesliga	13th	41,720
2006–07	2. Bundesliga	8th	35,688
2007–08	2. Bundesliga	11th	35,071
2008–09	2. Bundesliga	12th	28,135
2009–10	2. Bundesliga	8th	22,515
2010–11	2. Bundesliga	9th	19,768
2011–12	2. Bundesliga	6th	22,898
2012–13	2. Bundesliga	6th	22,682
2013–14	2. Bundesliga	7th	19,312
2014–15	2. Bundesliga	16th	21,917
2015–16	2. Bundesliga	15th	23,186
2016–17	2. Bundesliga	16th ↓↓	25,900
2017–18	Regionalliga Bayern (IV)	1st ↑	12,471
2018–19	3. Liga (III)	12th	14,593
2019–20	3. Liga	8th	10,211
2020–21	3. Liga	4th	0
2021–22	3. Liga	4th	8,266
2022–23	3. Liga	8th	15,000
2023–24	3. Liga	15th	15,000
2024–25	3. Liga	11th	15,000
2025–26	3. Liga	8th ↓	15,000
2026–27	Regionalliga Bayern (IV)		

↑ Promoted	↓ Relegated

== Honours ==
=== League ===
- German Championship/Bundesliga
  - Champions: 1965–66
  - Runners-up: 1931, 1966–67
- Oberliga Süd (I)
  - Champions: 1962–63
- Gauliga Bayern (I)
  - Champions: 1940–41, 1942–43
- 2. Bundesliga (II)
  - Champions: 1978–79
  - Runners-up: 1976–77
- 2. Oberliga Süd (II)
  - Champions: 1954–55, 1956–57
- Bayernliga (III)
  - Champions: 1983–84, 1990–91, 1992–93
  - Runners-up: 1985–86, 1989–90
- Regionalliga Bayern (IV)
  - Champions: 2017–18

=== Cup ===
- German Cup/DFB-Pokal
  - Winner: 1942, 1963–64
- Bavarian Cup
  - Winner: 2019–20

=== International ===
- European Cup Winners' Cup
  - Runners-up: 1964–65
- Coppa delle Alpi
  - Runners-up: 1967
- Tournoi de Pentecôte du Red Star
  - Winners: 1927

=== Youth ===
- German Under 19 championship
  - Runners-up: 1996–97
- German Under 17 championship
  - Champions: 2005–06
  - Runners-up: 1983–84
- German Under 19 cup
  - Winners: 2000, 2007
- Bavarian Under 19 championship
  - Winners: 1950–51, 1956–57, 1962–63, 1981–82, 1982–83, 1987–88, 1997–98^{‡}
  - Runners-up: 1957–58, 1968–69, 1969–70, 1976–77, 1983–84, 1985–86
- Bavarian Under 19 cup
  - Winners: 2006, 2007, 2014
  - Runners-up: 2016
- Bavarian Under 17 championship
  - Winners: 1974–75, 1979–80, 1983–84
  - Runners-up: 1978–79, 1980–81, 1998–99, 2017–18, 2018–19
- Bavarian Under 15 championship
  - Winners: 1978–79, 1979–80, 1996–97, 1997–98, 1999–2000, 2011–12

=== Reserve team ===
- Regionalliga Bayern (IV)
  - Champions: 2012–13
- Bayernliga (IV)
  - Champions: 1996–97, 2003–04
  - Runners-up: 2001–02, 2002–03
- Bayernliga-South (III)
  - Champions: 1960–61
  - Runners-up: 1959–60
- Landesliga Bayern-Süd (IV–V)
  - Champions: 1995–96
  - Runners-up: 1964–65, 1966–67, 1973–74, 1981–82
- Bezirksoberliga Oberbayern (VI)
  - Runners-up: 1994–95

== Players ==
=== Current squad ===
As of 31 August 2026

Note: Flags indicate national team as defined under FIFA eligibility rules; some limited exceptions apply. Players may hold more than one non-FIFA nationality.

No.	Pos.	Nation	Player
1	GK	GER	Paul Bachmann
2	DF	GER	Julian Bell
4	DF	GER	Felix Weber
5	MF	ENG	Mathew Collins
6	DF	GER	Benedict Hoppe
7	FW	GER	Florian Niederlechner
8	MF	GER	Raphael Wach
9	FW	GER	Fabio Wagner
10	MF	GER	Tunay Deniz
11	FW	GER	Brahim Moumou
13	MF	GER	Michael Eberwein
14	MF	GER	Dennis Dressel
12	FW	GER	Ortivero Calderon
17	FW	ITA	Cristian Leone

No.	Pos.	Nation	Player
18	MF	GER	Eric Uhlmann
19	FW	TUR	Emre Erdoğan
20	FW	GER	Noah Klose
21	DF	GER	Moritz Seiffert
23	GK	CRO	Stefan Musa
24	DF	ARM	Mark Gevorgyan
25	MF	BIH	Damjan Dordan
27	MF	GER	Raphael Ott
30	GK	GER	Vitus Eicher
33	DF	GER	Lasse Faßmann
34	DF	KOS	Edon Krasniqi
39	DF	GER	Ludwig Estermann
47	DF	GER	Lance Fiedler

== Coaches ==
- (England) Fred Spiksley (1912–14)
- (Weimar Republic) Max Breunig (1926–28)
- (Austria) Richard Kohn (1928–30)
- (Weimar Republic) (Nazi Germany) Max Breunig (1930–37)
- (Nazi Germany) Max Schäfer (1937–38)
- (Nazi Germany) Dietrich Tillmann (1938–39)
- (Nazi Germany) Otto Eckhardt (1939–40)
- (Nazi Germany) Franz Schmeifler (1940–41)
- (Nazi Germany) Max Schäfer (1941–45)
- (Allied-occupied Germany) Ludwig Goldbrunner (1945–46)
- (Allied-occupied Germany) Georg Ertl (1946–47)
- (Allied-occupied Germany) (West Germany) Max Schäfer (1947–51)
- (Austria) Josef Molzer (1951–52)
- (West Germany) Fred Harthaus (1952–55)
- (West Germany) Max Schäfer (1955–56)
- (West Germany) Hans Hipp (1956–61)
- (Austria) Max Merkel (1961–66)
- (West Germany) Hans-Wolfgang Weber (1966–67)
- (West Germany) Gunter Baumann (1967)
- (West Germany) Albert Sing (1967–68)
- (West Germany) Hans Pilz (1968–69)
- (West Germany) Fritz Langner (1969)
- (Austria) Franz Binder (1969–70)
- (West Germany) Hans Tilkowski (1970–72)
- (Socialist Republic of Romania) Elek Schwartz (1972–73)
- (West Germany) Rudi Gutendorf (1973–74)
- (Austria) Max Merkel (1974–75)
- (West Germany) Heinz Lucas (1975–78)
- (West Germany) Eckhard Krautzun (1978–79)
- (West Germany) Alfred Baumann (1979)
- (West Germany) Carl-Heinz Rühl (1979–81)
- (Czechoslovakia) Wenzel Halama (1981–82)
- (West Germany) Willibert Kremer (1982)
- (West Germany) Kurt Schwarzhuber (1982)
- (West Germany) Erich Beer (1983)
- (West Germany) Bernd Patzke (1983–84)
- (Socialist Republic of Romania) Octavian Popescu (1984)
- (West Germany) Erich Beer (1984)
- (Czechoslovakia) Wenzel Halama (1984–86)
- (West Germany) Dieter Kurz (1986)
- (Socialist Federal Republic of Yugoslavia) Fahrudin Jusufi (1986–87)
- (West Germany) Thomas Zander (1987)
- (West Germany) Uwe Klimaschewski (1987–88)
- (West Germany) Willi Bierofka (1988–90)
- (Germany) Karsten Wettberg (1990–92)
- (Germany) Werner Lorant (1992–01)
- (Austria) Peter Pacult (2001–03)
- (Germany) Falko Götz (2003–04)
- (Netherlands) Gerald Vanenburg (2004)
- (Germany) Rudi Bommer (2004)
- (Germany) Reiner Maurer (2004–06)
- (Germany) Bernhard Trares (2006)
- (Austria) Walter Schachner (2006–07)
- (Germany) Marco Kurz (2007–09)
- (Germany) Uwe Wolf (2009)
- (Germany) Ewald Lienen (2009–10)
- (Germany) Reiner Maurer (2010–12)
- (Germany) Alexander Schmidt (2012–13)
- (Germany) Friedhelm Funkel (2013–14)
- (Germany) Markus von Ahlen (2014)
- (Netherlands) Ricardo Moniz (2014)
- (Germany) Markus von Ahlen (2014–15)
- (Germany) Torsten Fröhling (2015)
- (Germany) Benno Möhlmann (2015–16)
- (Germany) Daniel Bierofka (2016)
- (Germany) Kosta Runjaić (2016)
- (Germany) Daniel Bierofka (2016)
- (Portugal) Vítor Pereira (2017)
- (Germany) Daniel Bierofka (2017–2019)
- (Germany) Oliver Beer (2019)
- (Germany) Michael Köllner (2019–2023)
- (Germany) Günther Gorenzel (2023)
- (Italy) Maurizio Jacobacci (2023)
- (Germany) Frank Schmöller (2023–2024)
- (Greece) Argiris Giannikis (2024–2025)
- (Germany) Patrick Glöckner (2024–2025)
- (Germany) Alper Kayabunar (2025)
- (Germany) Markus Kauczinski (2025–2026)
- (Germany) Alper Kayabunar (2026-)

== Notable famous or former players ==
- (Weimar Republic) (Nazi Germany) Josef Wendl (1924–45)
- (Weimar Republic) Eugen Kling (1924–31)
- (Weimar Republic) Josef Hornauer (1925–28)
- (Weimar Republic) (Nazi Germany) Ludwig Lachner (1929–34)
- (Nazi Germany) Otto Oeldenberger (1934–41)
- (Nazi Germany) (Allied-occupied Germany) (West Germany) Max Schäfer (1937–56)
- (Allied-occupied Germany) (West Germany) Fritz Sommer (1945–58)
- (West Germany) Rudolf Brunnenmeier (1960–68)
- (West Germany) Hans Reich (1960–69, 1974–76)
- (West Germany) Hans Küppers (1961–68)
- (West Germany) Petar Radenković (1962–70)
- (West Germany) Manfred Wagner (1963–70)
- (West Germany) Wilfried Kohlars (1963–70)
- (West Germany) Peter Grosser (1963–69)
- (West Germany) Otto Luttrop (1963–66)
- (West Germany) Timo Konietzka (1965–67)
- (West Germany) Bernd Patzke (1964–69)
- (West Germany) Willi Bierofka (1973–79)
- (West Germany) Rudi Völler (1980–82)
- (West Germany) Stephan Beckenbauer (1988–90)
- (Germany) Rainer Berg (1990–97)
- (Bulgaria) Daniel Borimirov (1995–04)
- (Germany) Jens Jeremies (1995–98)
- (Austria) Harald Cerny (1996–07)
- (Ghana) Abedi Pele (1996–98)
- (Germany) Manfred Bender (1996–99)
- (Australia) Paul Agostino (1997–07)
- (Germany) Thomas Häßler (1999–03)
- (Germany) Martin Max (1999–03)
- (Germany) Daniel Bierofka (2000–02; 2007–14)
- (Croatia) Davor Šuker (2001–03)
- (Germany) Lars Bender (2006–09)
- (Germany) Sven Bender (2006–09)
- (United States) Gregg Berhalter (2006–09)
- (Austria) Julian Baumgartlinger (2007–09)
- (Germany) Kevin Volland (2010–11)
- (Germany) Kai Bülow (2010–17)
- (Germany) Julian Weigl (2013–15)
- (Germany) Marius Wolf (2014–16)
- (Germany) Florian Neuhaus (2016–17)
- (Croatia) Ivica Olić (2016–17)

== Sponsorship ==
Year	Kit Manufacturer	Sponsor	Industry
1963–73	Adidas	no sponsor	
1973–76	Adidas	Frucade	Drinks
1976–79	Puma	Frucade	Drinks
1979–81	Puma	Doppeldusch	Skin Care
1981–83	Puma	Hedos	Clothing
1983–86	Puma	Vereinigte	Insurance
1986–89	Puma	Löwenbräu	Brewery
1989–90	Puma	Karnehm	Furniture
1990–91	Puma	Hacker-Pschorr	Brewery
1991–93	Puma	Lancia	Automobile
1993–94	Lotto	Ha-Ra	Cleaning
1994–95	Lotto	Löwenbräu	Brewery
1995–99	Nike	Löwenbräu	Brewery
1999–02	Nike	FTI	Tourism
2002–05	Nike	Liqui Moly	Motor Oil
2005–06	Nike	Festina	Watches
2006–07	Kappa	bwin	Sports Betting
2007–08	Kappa	trenkwalder	Personal Services
2008–09	Erima	trenkwalder	Personal Services
2009–10	Erima	Liqui Moly	Lubricants
2010–11	Erima	Comarch	Software
2011–13	Uhlsport	Aston Martin	Automobile
2013–15	Uhlsport	Volkswagen	Automobile
2015–16	Macron	Volkswagen	Automobile
2016–20	Macron	Die Bayerische	Insurance
2020–25	Nike	Die Bayerische	Insurance
2025–26	Joma	Die Bayerische	Insurance
2026-	Societas	Dialog	Insurance
