= 1966–67 Inter-Cities Fairs Cup =

Tournament details
- Dates: 24 August 1966 – 6 September 1967
- Teams: 48

Final positions
- Champions: (Socialist Federal Republic of Yugoslavia) Dinamo Zagreb (1st title)
- Runners-up: (England) Leeds United

Tournament statistics
- Matches played: 94
- Goals scored: 284 (3.02 per match)
- Top scorer: (Hungary) Flórián Albert (8 goals)

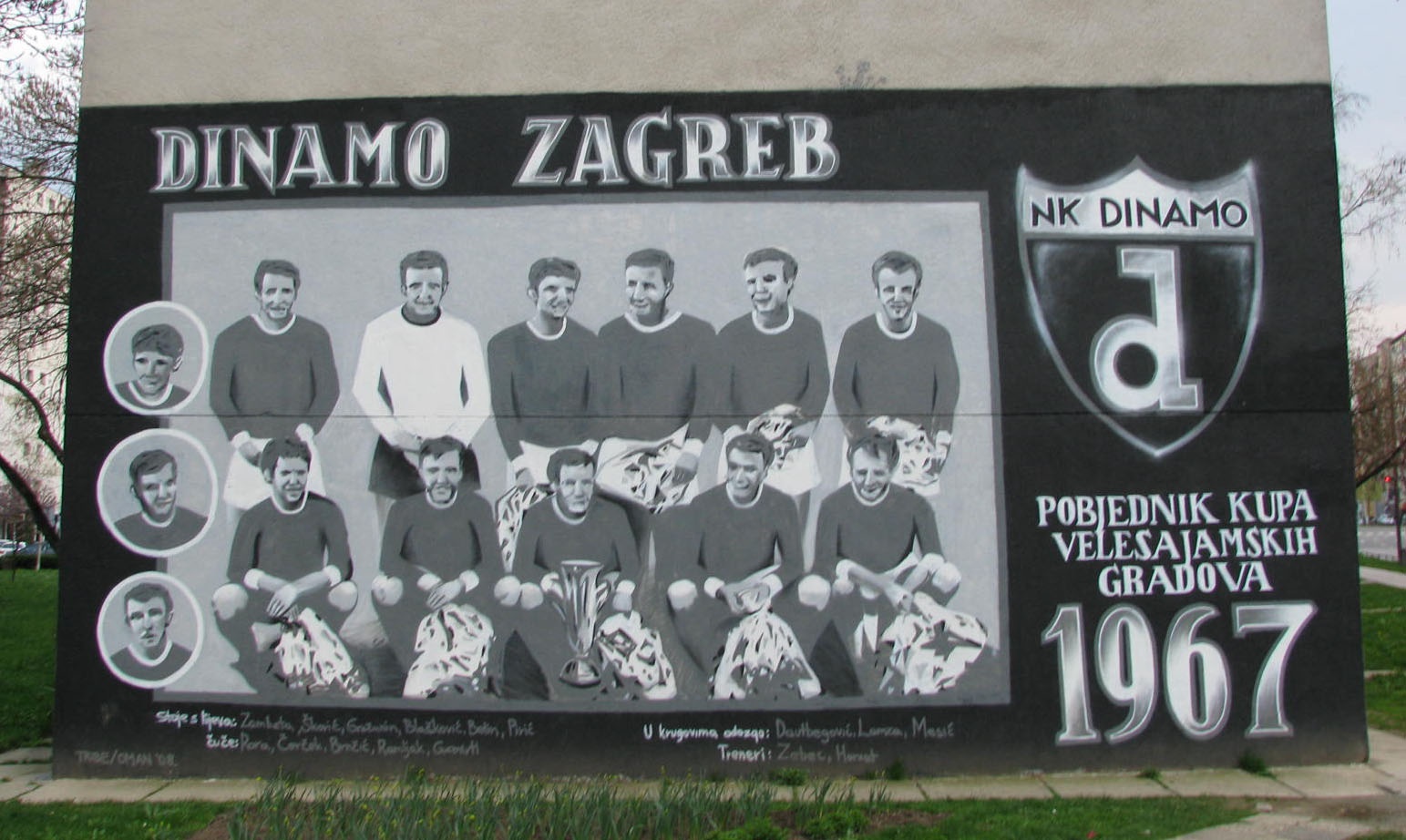
Graffiti in Zagreb commemorating the Dinamo Zagreb 1966–67 Inter-Cities Fairs Cup winning generation.

The ninth Inter-Cities Fairs Cup was played over the 1966–67 season. The competition was won by Dinamo Zagreb over two legs in the final against Leeds United. For the first time in the history of the cup, replays were scrapped, with sides going through thanks to scoring more away goals, or by tossing a coin after extra time if the sides could not be separated. Dinamo benefitted from both in the early rounds.

== First round ==
Team 1	Agg.	Team 2	1st leg	2nd leg
Drumcondra FC (Republic of Ireland)	1–8	(West Germany) Eintracht Frankfurt	0–2	1–6
OGC Nice (France)	3–4	(Sweden) Örgryte IS	2–2	1–2
Olimpija Ljubljana (Socialist Federal Republic of Yugoslavia)	3–6	(Hungary) Ferencvárosi TC	3–3	0–3
VfB Stuttgart (West Germany)	1–3	(England) Burnley	1–1	0–2
Wiener Sport-Club (Austria)	2–5	(Italy) Napoli	1–2	1–3
Aris (Greece)	0–7	(Italy) Juventus	0–2	0–5
Dinamo Piteşti (Romania)	4–2	(Spain) Sevilla FC	2–0	2–2
SK Frigg (Norway)	2–6	(Scotland) Dunfermline Athletic F.C.	1–3	1–3
Spartak Brno (Czechoslovakia)	2–2(c)	(Socialist Federal Republic of Yugoslavia) Dinamo Zagreb	2–0	0–2(aet)
Göztepe (Turkey)	2–5	(Italy) Bologna	1–2	1–3
DOS Utrecht (Netherlands)	4–3	(Switzerland) FC Basel	2–1	2–2
1. FC Nürnberg (West Germany)	1–4	(Spain) Valencia CF	1–2	0–2
FK Red Star (Socialist Federal Republic of Yugoslavia)	5–2	(Spain) Athletic Bilbao	5–0	0–2
Djurgårdens IF (Sweden)	2–5	(East Germany) 1. FC Lokomotive Leipzig	1–3	1–2
US Luxembourg	0–2	(Belgium) R. Antwerp F.C.	0–1	0–1
FC Porto (Portugal)	3–3(c)	(France) FC Girondins de Bordeaux	2–1	1–2(aet)

=== First leg ===
21 September 1966

Drumcondra FC (Republic of Ireland)	0–2	(West Germany) Eintracht Frankfurt
	Report	Lotz 25', 30'

Dalymount Park, Dublin
Attendance: 8,600
Referee: William Gow (Wales)

21 September 1966

OGC Nice (France)	2–2	(Sweden) Örgryte IS
Santos 66'; Loubet 80'	Report	Simonsson 42', 55'

Stade du Ray, Nice
Attendance: 5,566
Referee: Fabio Monti (Italy)

21 September 1966

Olimpija Ljubljana (Socialist Federal Republic of Yugoslavia)	3–3	(Hungary) Ferencvárosi TC
Frančeškin 35'; Kokot 80'; Arslanagić 88'	Report	Albert 23', 68'; Rákosi 66'

Bežigrad Stadium, Ljubljana
Attendance: 6,900
Referee: Eduard Babauczek (Austria)

20 September 1966

VfB Stuttgart (West Germany)	1–1	(England) Burnley
Weiß 50' (pen.)	Report	Irvine 17'; O'Neil (red card) 85'

Neckarstadion, Stuttgart
Attendance: 10,000
Referee: Gilbert Droz (Switzerland)

1 September 1966

Wiener Sport-Club (Austria)	1–2	(Italy) Napoli
Knoll 42'	Report	Cané 27'; Orlando 73'

Praterstadion, Vienna
Attendance: 4,000
Referee: Anton Bucheli (Switzerland)

11 September 1966

Aris (Greece)	0–2	(Italy) Juventus
	Report	del Sol 30'; Menichelli 52'

Kleanthis Vikelidis Stadium, Thessaloniki
Attendance: 27,300
Referee: Edgar Deuschel (Germany)

21 September 1966

Dinamo Pitești (Romania)	2–0	(Spain) Sevilla
Radu 2'; Nagy 10'	Report

Stadionul 1 Mai, Pitești
Attendance: 6,900
Referee: Ratko Čanak (Yugoslavia)

24 August 1966

SK Frigg (Norway)	1–3	(Scotland) Dunfermline
Pettersen 1'	Report	Callaghan 36'; Fleming 46', 50'

Bislett Stadium, Oslo
Attendance: 6,300
Referee: Aranth Jensen (Denmark)

21 September 1966

Spartak Brno (Czechoslovakia)	2–0	(Socialist Federal Republic of Yugoslavia) Dinamo Zagreb
Mesić 10' (o.g.); Bubník 79'	Report

Stadion Za Lužánkami, Brno
Attendance: 2,000
Referee: Vasile Dumitrescu (Romania)

11 September 1966

Göztepe (Turkey)	1–2	(Italy) Bologna
Ceyhan 69'	Report	Vastola 17'; Nielsen 60'

İzmir Alsancak Stadium, İzmir
Attendance: 23,000
Referee: Luben Spasov (Bulgaria)

13 September 1966

DOS Utrecht (Netherlands)	2–1	(Switzerland) Basel
Stocker 18' (o.g.); Wery 65'	Report	Odermatt 15'

Galgenwaard, Utrecht
Attendance: 4,100
Referee: William J. Mullan (Scotland)

21 September 1966

1. FC Nürnberg (West Germany)	1–2	(Spain) Valencia CF
Strehl 17'	Report	Claramunt 24'; Waldo 41'

Städtisches Stadion, Nürnberg
Attendance: 9,000
Referee: Paul Schiller (Austria)

21 September 1966

FK Red Star (Socialist Federal Republic of Yugoslavia)	5–0	(Spain) Athletic Bilbao
Mihailović 30'; Džajić 40', 58' (pen.); Ostojić 76'; Melić 87'	Report

Marakana, Belgrade
Attendance: 35,000
Referee: Gusztáv Bircsák (Hungary)

24 August 1966

Djurgårdens IF (Sweden)	1–3	(East Germany) 1. FC Lokomotive Leipzig
Persson 60'	Report	Frenzel 45'; Löwe 53'; Berger 63'

Stockholm Olympic Stadium, Stockholm
Attendance: 4,200
Referee: Hans Granlund (Norway)

21 September 1966

US Luxembourg	0–1	(Belgium) R. Antwerp F.C.
	Report	Van Moer 24'

Stade Municipal, Luxembourg City
Attendance: 1,300
Referee: Pierre Schwinte (France)

21 September 1966

FC Porto (Portugal)	2–1	(France) FC Girondins de Bordeaux
Pinto 58' (pen.); Pavão 70'	Report	Robuschi 82'

Estádio das Antas, Porto
Attendance: 16,700
Referee: Manuel Gómez Arribas (Spain)

=== Second leg ===
5 October 1966

Eintracht Frankfurt (West Germany)	6–1	(Republic of Ireland) Drumcondra FC
Kraus 5', 56'; Lotz 14'; Kenny 45' (o.g.); Huberts 60'; Solz 72'	Report	Whelan 20'

Waldstadion, Frankfurt
Attendance: 4,500
Referee: Hubert Burguet (Belgium)

Eintracht Frankfurt won 8–1 on aggregate.

27 September 1966

Örgryte IS (Sweden)	2–1	(France) OGC Nice
Simonsson 52'; Hansson 57'	Report	Barrionuevo 83'

Ullevi, Gothenburg
Attendance: 3,000
Referee: Johannes Malka (Germany)

Örgryte IS won 4–3 on aggregate.

5 October 1966

Ferencvárosi TC (Hungary)	3–0	(Socialist Federal Republic of Yugoslavia) Olimpija Ljubljana
Albert 9'; Rákosi 10'; Varga 75'	Report

Népstadion, Budapest
Attendance: 68,000
Referee: Pavel Spotak (Czechoslovakia)

Ferencvárosi TC won 6–3 on aggregate.

27 September 1966

Burnley (England)	2–0	(West Germany) VfB Stuttgart
Coates 57'; Lochhead 78'	Report

Turf Moor, Burnley
Attendance: 23,716
Referee: Johan Einar Boström (Sweden)

Burnley won 3–1 on aggregate.

21 September 1966

Napoli (Italy)	3–1	(Austria) Wiener Sport-Club
Cané 10'; Sívori 25'; Bianchi 26'	Report	Schmidt 44'

Stadio San Paolo, Naples
Attendance: 21,000
Referee: Marcel Deckx (Belgium)

Napoli won 5–2 on aggregate.

21 September 1966

Juventus (Italy)	5–0	(Greece) Aris Thessaloniki F.C.
Menichelli 32'; Favalli 36', 87'; De Paoli 65'; Gori 81'	Report

Stadio Comunale, Turin
Attendance: 9,800
Referee: John Paterson (Scotland)

Juventus won 7–0 on aggregate.

5 October 1966

Sevilla (Spain)	2–2	(Romania) Dinamo Piteşti
Dieguez 14'; Cabral 77'	Report	Prepurgel 65'; Nagy 69'

Ramón Sánchez Pizjuán Stadium, Seville
Attendance: 36,000
Referee: Aníbal Oliveira (Portugal)

Dinamo Piteşti won 4–2 on aggregate.

28 September 1966

Dunfermline (Scotland)	3–1	(Norway) SK Frigg
Delaney 10', 40'; Callaghan 28'	Report	Ballangrud 1'

East End Park, Dunfermline
Attendance: 6,300
Referee: Jim Finney (England)

Dunfermline won 6–2 on aggregate.

5 October 1966

Dinamo Zagreb (Socialist Federal Republic of Yugoslavia)	2–0 (a.e.t.)	(Czechoslovakia) Spartak Brno
Zambata 4'; Jukić 73'	Report

Stadion Maksimir, Zagreb
Attendance: 10,800
Referee: Günter Männig (Germany)

Dinamo Zagreb won on a coin toss.

28 September 1966

Bologna (Italy)	3–1	(Turkey) Göztepe
Pace 32', 59'; Haller 36' (pen.)	Report	Halil 64'

Stadio Renato Dall'Ara, Bologna
Attendance: 10,100
Referee: Mathias Frisch (Luxembourg)

Bologna won 5–2 on aggregate.

21 September 1966

Basel (Switzerland)	2–2	(Netherlands) DOS Utrecht
Frigerio 59', 62'	Report	Wery 69'; Van der Linden 78'

St. Jakob Stadium, Basel
Attendance: 6,300
Referee: Rudolf Kreitlein (Germany)

Utrecht won 4–3 on aggregate.

5 October 1966

Valencia CF (Spain)	2–0	(West Germany) 1. FC Nürnberg
Ansola 3'; Waldo 14' (pen.)	Report

Mestalla Stadium, Valencia
Attendance: 50,000
Referee: Norman Burtenshaw (England)

Valencia won 4–1 on aggregate.

28 September 1966

Athletic Bilbao (Spain)	2–0	(Socialist Federal Republic of Yugoslavia) FK Red Star
Estéfano 54', 88'	Report

San Mamés Stadium, Bilbao
Attendance: 21,500
Referee: Roger Barde (France)

FK Red Star won 5–2 on aggregate.

27 September 1966

1. FC Lokomotive Leipzig (East Germany)	2–1	(Sweden) Djurgårdens IF
Trölitzsch 24'; Karlsson 68' (o.g.)	Report	Wiestål 69'

Zentralstadion, Leipzig
Attendance: 4,200
Referee: Jef Dorpmans (Netherlands)

1. FC Lokomotive Leipzig won 5–2 on aggregate.

28 September 1966

R. Antwerp F.C. (Belgium)	1–0	US Luxembourg
Jansen 29'	Report

Bosuilstadion, Antwerp
Attendance: 4,000
Referee: Kurt Handwerker (Germany)

R. Antwerp F.C. won 2-0 on aggregate.

5 October 1966

FC Girondins de Bordeaux (France)	2–1 (a.e.t.)	(Portugal) FC Porto
Texier 40'; Péri 78'	Report	Djalma 35'

Parc Lescure, Bordeaux
Attendance: 10,320
Referee: Alessandro D'Agostini (Italy)

FC Girondins de Bordeaux won on a coin toss.

== Second round ==
Team 1	Agg.	Team 2	1st leg	2nd leg
Eintracht Frankfurt (West Germany)	7–3	(Denmark) Hvidovre IF	5–1	2–2
Örgryte IS (Sweden)	1–7	(Hungary) Ferencvárosi TC	0–0	1–7
Lausanne Sports (Switzerland)	1–8	(England) Burnley	1–3	0–5
B 1909 (Denmark)	2–6	(Italy) Napoli	1–4	1–2
Juventus (Italy)	5–1	(Portugal) Vitória FC	3–1	2–0
FC Barcelona (Spain)	1–4	(Scotland) Dundee United	1–2	0–2
Toulouse FC (France)	4–5	(Romania) Dinamo Piteşti	3–0	1–5
Dunfermline Athletic F.C. (Scotland)	4 – 4(a)	(Socialist Federal Republic of Yugoslavia) Dinamo Zagreb	4–2	0–2
Sparta Prague (Czechoslovakia)	3–4	(Italy) Bologna	2–2	1–2
DOS Utrecht (Netherlands)	3–6	(England) West Bromwich Albion	1–1	2–5
DWS (Netherlands)	2–8	(England) Leeds United	1–3	1–5
Valencia CF (Spain)	3–1	(Socialist Federal Republic of Yugoslavia) FK Red Star	1–0	2–1
1. FC Lokomotive Leipzig (East Germany)	2–1	(Belgium) RFC Liegeois	0–0	2–1
FC Spartak Plovdiv (Bulgaria)	1–4	(Portugal) S.L. Benfica	1–1	0–3
R. Antwerp F.C. (Belgium)	2–8	(Scotland) Kilmarnock	0–1	2–7
K.A.A. Gent (Belgium)	1–0	(France) FC Girondins de Bordeaux	1–0	0–0

=== First leg ===
25 October 1966

B 1909 (Denmark)	1–4	(Italy) Napoli
Haastrup 48'		Sívori 9' 20'; Altafini 49'; Cané 52'

Odense

9 November 1966

Juventus (Italy)	3–1	(Portugal) Vitória FC
Castano 72'; Favalli 75' del Sol 88'		Carlos Manuel 10'

Stadio Olimpico, Turin
Attendance: 3,000
Referee: Robert Héliès (France)

25 October 1966
20:45

Barcelona (Spain)	1–2	(Scotland) Dundee United
Fusté 82'	Report	Hainey 13'; Seemann 59' (pen.)

Camp Nou, Barcelona
Attendance: 16,800
Referee: Josip Horvath (Yugoslavia)

19 October 1966

Toulouse (France)	3–0	(Romania) Dinamo Pitești
Soukhane 32'; Dorsini 42', 44'	Report

Stadium de Toulouse, Toulouse
Attendance: 5,000
Referee: João Pinto Ferreira (Portugal)

26 October 1966

Sparta Prague (Czechoslovakia)	2–2	(Italy) Bologna
Mašek 10'; Pospíchal 81'		Turra 3'; Haller 70'

Prague

26 October 1966

FC Spartak Plovdiv (Bulgaria)	1–1	(Portugal) Benfica
Dishkov 30'		Eusébio 4'

Stadion 9-ti Septemvri, Plovdiv
Attendance: 30,000
Referee: Alojz Obtulovič (Czechoslovakia)

=== Second leg ===
2 November 1966

Napoli (Italy)	2–1	(Denmark) B 1909
Braca 84'; Altafini 85'		Haastrup 8'

Naples

Napoli won 6–2 on aggregate.

30 November 1966

Vitória Setúbal (Portugal)	0–2	(Italy) Juventus
		Gori 10'; De Paoli 51'

Estádio da Luz, Lisbon
Attendance: 1,600
Referee: Ken Dagnall (England)

Juventus won 5–1 on aggregate.

16 November 1966
19:30

Dundee United (Scotland)	2–0	(Spain) Barcelona
Mitchell 18'; Hainey 49'	Report

Tannadice Park, Dundee
Attendance: 28,000
Referee: Robert Schaut (Belgium)

Dundee United won 4–1 on aggregate.

26 October 1966

Dinamo Pitești (Romania)	5–1	(France) Toulouse
David 19'; Dobrin 50'; Radu 55', 59'; Țurcan 90'	Report	Wojciak 42'

Stadionul 1 Mai, Pitești
Attendance: 15,000
Referee: Fabio Monti (Italy)

Dinamo Pitești won 5–4 on aggregate.

27 November 1966

Bologna (Italy)	2–1	(Czechoslovakia) Sparta Prague
Haller 9' 46'		Jurkanin 21'

Bologna
Referee: Erich Linemayr

Bologna won 4–3 on aggregate.

22 November 1966

(Portugal) Benfica	3–0	FC Spartak Plovdiv (Bulgaria)
Eusébio 53'; Torres 55'; Dimov 76' (o.g.)

Estádio da Luz, Lisbon
Attendance: 14,200
Referee: John Paterson (Scotland)

Benfica won 4–1 on aggregate.

== Third round ==
Team 1	Agg.	Team 2	1st leg	2nd leg
Eintracht Frankfurt (West Germany)	5–3	(Hungary) Ferencvárosi TC	4–1	1–2
Burnley (England)	3–0	(Italy) Napoli	3–0	0–0
Juventus (Italy)	3–1	(Scotland) Dundee United	3–0	0–1
Dinamo Piteşti (Romania)	0–1	(Socialist Federal Republic of Yugoslavia) Dinamo Zagreb	0–1	0–0
Bologna (Italy)	6–1	(England) West Bromwich Albion	3–0	3–1
Leeds United (England)	3–1	(Spain) Valencia CF	1–1	2–0
1. FC Lokomotive Leipzig (East Germany)	4–3	(Portugal) S.L. Benfica	3–1	1–2
Kilmarnock (Scotland)	3–1	(Belgium) K.A.A. Gent	1–0	2 – 1(aet)

=== First leg ===
18 January 1967

Burnley (England)	3–0	(Italy) Napoli
Coates 2'; Latcham 22'; Lochhead 51'

Burnley

8 February 1967

Juventus (Italy)	3–0	(Scotland) Dundee United
Chinesinho 27' 67'; Menichelli 66'	Report

Stadio Comunale, Turin
Attendance: 6,800
Referee: Karl Keller (Switzerland)

19 February 1967

Dinamo Pitești (Romania)	0–1	(Socialist Federal Republic of Yugoslavia) Dinamo Zagreb
	Report	Zambata 17'

Stadionul 1 Mai, Pitești
Attendance: 18,000
Referee: Franz Mayer (Austria)

1 February 1967

Bologna (Italy)	3–0	(England) West Bromwich Albion
Turra 37'; Nielsen 39'; Haller 78'

Bologna

21 December 1966

1. FC Lokomotive Leipzig (East Germany)	3–1	(Portugal) Benfica
Santos 25' (o.g.); Frenzel 47', 51'		José Augusto 40'

Zentralstadion, Leipzig
Attendance: 68,000
Referee: Kevin Howley (England)

=== Second leg ===
8 February 1967

Napoli (Italy)	0–0	(England) Burnley

Naples

Burnley won 3–0 on aggregate.

8 March 1967

Dundee United (Scotland)	1–0	(Italy) Juventus
Døssing 80'	Report

Dundee
Attendance: 20,500
Referee: Piet Roomer (Netherlands)

Juventus won 3–1 on aggregate.

1 March 1967

Dinamo Zagreb (Socialist Federal Republic of Yugoslavia)	0–0	(Romania) Dinamo Pitești
	Report

Stadion Maksimir, Zagreb
Attendance: 8,200
Referee: Bruno de Marchi (Italy)

Dinamo Zagreb won 1–0 on aggregate.

8 March 1967

West Bromwich Albion (England)	1–3	(Italy) Bologna
Fairfax 55'		Nielsen 38' 64'; Bulgarelli 43'

West Bromwich

Bologna won 6–1 on aggregate.

7 March 1967

(Portugal) Benfica	2–1	1. FC Lokomotive Leipzig (East Germany)
Eusébio 65' (pen.), 88'		Frenzel 81'

Estádio da Luz, Lisbon
Attendance: 50,000
Referee: William Syme (Scotland)

Lokomotive Leipzig won 4–3 on aggregate.

== Quarter-finals ==
Team 1	Agg.	Team 2	1st leg	2nd leg
Bologna (Italy)	1–1 (c)	(England) Leeds United	1–0	0–1 (aet)
Juventus (Italy)	2–5	(Socialist Federal Republic of Yugoslavia) Dinamo Zagreb	2–2	0–3
Eintracht Frankfurt (West Germany)	3–2	(England) Burnley	1–1	2–1
1. FC Lokomotive Leipzig (East Germany)	1–2	(Scotland) Kilmarnock	1–0	0–2

=== First leg ===
22 March 1967

Bologna (Italy)	1–0	(England) Leeds United
Nielsen 64'	Report

Stadio Comunale, Bologna
Attendance: 10,000
Referee: Gerhard Schulenburg (Germany)

29 March 1967

Juventus (Italy)	2–2	(Socialist Federal Republic of Yugoslavia) Dinamo Zagreb
Zigoni 4'; Stacchini 77'	Report	Jukić 13', 69'

Stadio Comunale, Turin
Attendance: 6,000
Referee: Joseph Heymann (Switzerland)

4 April 1967

Eintracht Frankfurt (West Germany)	1–1	(England) Burnley
Friedrich 35'	Report	Miller 60'

Waldstadion, Frankfurt
Attendance: 21,000
Referee: János Bíróczky (Hungary)

19 April 1967

1. FC Lokomotive Leipzig (East Germany)	1–0	(Scotland) Kilmarnock
Berger 3'	Report

Zentralstadion, Leipzig
Attendance: 21,000
Referee: Janus Aalbrecht (Netherlands)

=== Second leg ===
19 April 1967

Leeds United (England)	1–0 (a.e.t.)	(Italy) Bologna
Giles 9' (pen.)	Report

Elland Road, Leeds
Attendance: 42,126
Referee: Erwin Vetter (Germany)

Leeds United 1–1 Bologna on aggregate. Leeds United won on a coin toss.

19 April 1967

Dinamo Zagreb (Socialist Federal Republic of Yugoslavia)	3–0	(Italy) Juventus
Novak 4'; Mesić 67'; Belin 73'	Report

Stadion Maksimir, Zagreb
Attendance: 27,900
Referee: Paul Schiller (Austria)

Dinamo Zagreb won 5–2 on aggregate.

18 April 1967

Burnley (England)	1–2	(West Germany) Eintracht Frankfurt
Miller 86'	Report	Lotz 32'; Huberts 72'

Turf Moor, Burnley
Attendance: 25,161
Referee: Johan Boström (Sweden)

Eintracht Frankfurt won 3–2 on aggregate.

26 April 1967

Kilmarnock (Scotland)	2–0	(East Germany) 1. FC Lokomotive Leipzig
Murray 9'; McIlroy 64'	Report

Rugby Park, Kilmarnock
Attendance: 20,000
Referee: Joseph Hannet (Belgium)

Kilmarnock won 2–1 on aggregate.

== Semi-finals ==
Team 1	Agg.	Team 2	1st leg	2nd leg
Eintracht Frankfurt (West Germany)	3–4	(Socialist Federal Republic of Yugoslavia) Dinamo Zagreb	3–0	0–4 (a.e.t.)
Leeds United (England)	4–2	(Scotland) Kilmarnock	4–2	0–0

=== First leg ===
19 May 1967

Leeds United (England)	4–2	(Scotland) Kilmarnock
Belfitt 1', 4', 31'; Giles 38' (pen.)	Report	McIlroy 21', 35'

Elland Road, Leeds
Attendance: 43,189
Referee: Jef Dorpmans (Netherlands)

7 June 1967

Eintracht Frankfurt (West Germany)	3–0	(Socialist Federal Republic of Yugoslavia) Dinamo Zagreb
Grabowski 11'; Bechtold 14'; Solz 67'	Report

Waldstadion, Frankfurt
Attendance: 10,000
Referee: Michel Kitabdjian (France)

=== Second leg ===
25 May 1967

Kilmarnock (Scotland)	0–0	(England) Leeds United
	Report

Rugby Park, Kilmarnock
Attendance: 28,000
Referee: Vital Loraux (Belgium)

14 June 1967

Dinamo Zagreb (Socialist Federal Republic of Yugoslavia)	4–0 (a.e.t.)	(West Germany) Eintracht Frankfurt
Zambata 14'; Novak 15'; Gucmirtl 87'; Belin 102'	Report

Stadion Maksimir, Zagreb
Attendance: 35,000
Referee: Gyula Gere (Hungary)

== Final ==
Team 1	Agg.	Team 2	1st leg	2nd leg
Dinamo Zagreb (Socialist Federal Republic of Yugoslavia)	2–0	(England) Leeds United	2–0	0–0

== Top goalscorers ==
The top scorers from the 1966–67 Inter-Cities Fairs Cup are as follows:

Rank	Name	Team	Goals
1	(Hungary) Flórián Albert	(Hungary) Ferencváros	8
2	(Scotland) Andy Lochhead	(England) Burnley	6
2	(West Germany) Oskar Lotz	(West Germany) Eintracht Frankfurt	6
2	(Socialist Federal Republic of Yugoslavia) Slaven Zambata	(Socialist Federal Republic of Yugoslavia) Dinamo Zagreb	6
5	(West Germany) Helmut Haller	(Italy) Bologna	5
5	(Denmark) Harald Nielsen	(Italy) Bologna	5
5	(Austria) Wilhelm Huberts	(West Germany) Eintracht Frankfurt	5

Source: rsssf.com
