= 1963–64 Eintracht Frankfurt season =

Eintracht Frankfurt
1963–64 season
- Chairman: Rudolf Gramlich
- Manager: Paul Oßwald (resigned on 22 April 1964); Ivica Horvat
- Bundesliga: 3rd
- DFB-Pokal: Runners-up
- Top goalscorer: League: Wilhelm Huberts (19); All: Wilhelm Huberts (23)
- Highest home attendance: 55,000 7 September 1963 v 1. FC Nürnberg (league)
- Lowest home attendance: 10,500 14 December 1963 v Karlsruher SC (league)
- Average home league attendance: 26,767
Home colours	Away colours

The 1963–64 Eintracht Frankfurt season was the 64th season in the club's football history. In 1963–64 the club played in the Bundesliga, the newly found top tier of German football. It was the club's 1st season in the Bundesliga.

The season ended up with Eintracht reaching the German cup final for the first time, losing to TSV 1860 München.

== Matches ==
=== Legend ===
Win Draw Loss Postponed

=== Friendlies ===
20 July 1963	FSV Frankfurt (West Germany)	1–1	(West Germany) Eintracht Frankfurt
	Späth 47'	(Report)	Schämer 79'	Attendance: 10,000; Referee: Eisemann

27 July 1963	Borussia Fulda (West Germany)	0–2	(West Germany) Eintracht Frankfurt	Fulda, West Germany
		(Report)	Schämer 28', 70'	Attendance: 10,000; Referee: Laudenbach

28 July 1963	Würzburger FV (West Germany)	2–9	(West Germany) Eintracht Frankfurt
	Ott 63'; Nütz 71'	(Report)	Kraus 1', 20', 25', 60'; Lindner 3'; Trimhold 41', 50'; Huberts 51'; Schämer 87'	Attendance: 3,000; Referee: Krämer

3 August 1963	Eintracht Frankfurt (West Germany)	3–5	(Socialist Federal Republic of Yugoslavia) NK Rijeka	Frankfurt, West Germany
	Huberts 42'; Kress 55'; Stein 67'	(Report)	Naumović 14'; Vranković 20'; Nevlica 36', 48'; Lukarić 80'	Stadium: Riederwaldstadion; Attendance: 5,500; Referee: Wenzel

10 August 1963	VfB Unterliederbach (West Germany)	0–4	(West Germany) Eintracht Frankfurt	Unterliederbach, West Germany
		(Report)	Lindner 35'; Stein	Stadium: VfB-Platz; Attendance: 3,000

13 August 1963	Eintracht Frankfurt (West Germany)	1–1	(England) Manchester United	Frankfurt, West Germany
	Schämer 52'	(Report)	Cantwell (yellow card) 40' (yellow-red card); Crerand 48'	Stadium: Waldstadion; Attendance: 25,000; Referee: Handwerker

17 August 1963	FC Dornbirn (Austria)	1–2	(West Germany) Eintracht Frankfurt	Dornbirn, Austria
	Sadi 12'	(Report)	Huberts 58'; Kraus 75'	Attendance: 6,000; Referee: Pamminger

18 August 1963	SV Innsbruck (Austria)	0–10	(West Germany) Eintracht Frankfurt
		(Report)	Trimhold 10', 23', 36'; Solz 26'; Huberts 41'; Schämer 46' (pen.), 49'; Kraus 57', 85'; 76' (o.g.)	Attendance: 3,000

3 September 1963	FC 07 Bensheim (West Germany)	1–11	(West Germany) Eintracht Frankfurt	Bensheim, West Germany
	Sauter	(Report)	Friedrich; Solz; Schämer; Weilbächer; Betz; Stein; Herbert	Attendance: 5,000

26 September 1963	Eintracht Frankfurt (West Germany)	3–2	(France) Racing Strasbourg	Frankfurt, West Germany
	Solz 46'; Schämer 53'; Trimhold 89'	(Report)	Farías 27', 72'	Stadium: Riederwaldstadion; Attendance: 2,000; Referee: Sparing

29 September 1963	Union Niederrad (West Germany)	0–6	(West Germany) Eintracht Frankfurt	Frankfurt, West Germany
		(Report)	Kress 33', 52'; Weilbächer 62', 74', 88'; 83'; Solz	Stadium: Unionplatz; Attendance: 500; Referee: Otto

16 October 1963	Eintracht Frankfurt (West Germany)	12–0	(United States) Los Angeles Kickers	Frankfurt, West Germany
	Trimhold 3'; Stein 6', 9', 38'; Huberts 19' (pen.); Kress 25'; Lindner 36'; Schröder 64', 67'; Friedrich 65'; Schämer 69', 75'	(Report)		Stadium: Riederwaldstadion; Attendance: 1,500; Referee: Rodenhausen

28 December 1963	Eintracht Frankfurt (West Germany)	0–1	(Argentina) Boca Juniors	Frankfurt, West Germany
		(Report)	Sanfilippo 11'	Stadium: Waldstadion; Attendance: 3,000; Referee: Ott

25 March 1964	Wiener SC (Austria)	2–1	(West Germany) Eintracht Frankfurt	Vienna, Austria
	Hof 50'; Hamerl 90'	(Report)	Huberts 3'	Stadium: Hohe Warte; Attendance: 13,000; Referee: Wlachojanis

26 March 1964	Grazer AK (Austria)	2–2	(West Germany) Eintracht Frankfurt	Graz, Austria
	Steßl 18', 85'	(Report)	Stein 37'; Trimhold 39'	Attendance: 15,000; Referee: Haberfellner

1 May 1964	1. FC Kaiserslautern (West Germany)	3–3	(West Germany) Eintracht Frankfurt	Biebesheim, West Germany
	Wrenger 70', 82'; Mangold 90'	(Report)	Friedrich 62'; Schämer 73', 86'	Stadium: Rheinstadion; Attendance: 7,000; Referee: Rodenhausen

13 May 1964	Eintracht Frankfurt (West Germany)	5–2	(Switzerland) FC Grenchen	Frankfurt, West Germany
	Huberts 23', 27', 63', 89'; Kraus 61'	(Report)	Dubios 39'; Kominek 48'	Stadium: Riederwaldstadion; Attendance: 1,700; Referee: Spindler

28 May 1964	Eintracht Frankfurt (West Germany)	2–2	(West Germany) Ludwigshafener SC	Großheubach, West Germany
	Kraus 9'; Trimhold 45'	(Report)	Link 22'; Buchert 24'	Attendance: 4,000; Referee: Müller

6 June 1964	Eintracht Frankfurt (West Germany)	5–0	Hong Kong XI	Frankfurt, West Germany
	Kraus 1', 14'; Stein 5', 30', 44'	(Report)		Stadium: Riederwaldstadion; Attendance: 2,500; Referee: Rodenhausen

17 June 1964	Bloemfontein XI (South Africa)	3–6	(West Germany) Eintracht Frankfurt	Bloemfontein, South Africa
	5'; 50'; 59'	(Report)	Stein 23'; Trimhold 30'; Friedrich 40', 58', 60'; Herbert 66'	Attendance: 4,000

22 June 1964	Western Cape XI (South Africa)	1–4	(West Germany) Eintracht Frankfurt	Cape Town, South Africa
	Thornley 70'	(Report)	Huberts 37' (pen.), 71'; Kraus 75'; Trimhold 87'	Attendance: 15,000

24 June 1964	Addington FC (South Africa)	0–2	(West Germany) Eintracht Frankfurt	Durban, South Africa
		(Report)	Huberts 32'; Kraus 44'	Attendance: 12,000

27 June 1964	Highlands Park (South Africa)	1–2	(West Germany) Eintracht Frankfurt	Johannesburg, South Africa
	68'	(Report)	Stein 1'; Kraus 45'	Attendance: 20,000

29 June 1964	Arcadia United (South Africa)	0–2	(West Germany) Eintracht Frankfurt	Pretoria, South Africa
		(Report)	Huberts 62'; Stinka 88'	Attendance: 8,000

4 July 1964	South-West Africa XI (South Africa)	0–8	(West Germany) Eintracht Frankfurt	Windhoek, South-West Africa
		(Report)	Kraus 30'; Huberts 42', 84'; Stein 59', 68', 86'; Schröder 65'; Trimhold 83'	Attendance: 3,500

=== Bundesliga ===
==== Results summary ====
Overall								Home						Away					
Pld	W	D	L	GF	GA	GD	Pts	W	D	L	GF	GA	GD	W	D	L	GF	GA	GD
30	16	7	7	65	41	+24	55	10	3	2	43	20	+23	6	4	5	22	21	+1

Source: Competitive matches

==== Results by round ====
Round	1	2	3	4	5	6	7	8	9	10	11	12	13	14	15	16	17	18	19	20	21	22	23	24	25	26	27	28	29	30
Ground	H	A	H	A	H	A	H	A	A	H	A	H	H	A	H	A	A	H	A	H	A	H	H	A	H	H	A	A	H	A
Result	D	L	L	L	W	L	W	D	W	W	L	W	W	W	L	D	L	D	W	W	D	W	W	W	D	W	W	W	W	W
Position	7	13	14	15	14	14	13	13	12	10	11	11	8	7	8	7	8	10	8	7	7	6	6	5	4	3	3	3	3	3

Source: Competitive matches
A = Away; H = Home; W = Win; D = Draw; L = Loss

==== League fixtures and results ====
24 August 1963 1	Eintracht Frankfurt	1–1	1. FC Kaiserslautern	Frankfurt, West Germany
17:00 CEST	Schämer 40' (pen.)	(Report)	Neumann 38' (pen.)	Stadium: Waldstadion; Attendance: 30,000; Referee: Malka

31 August 1963 2	Meidericher SV	3–1	Eintracht Frankfurt	Duisburg, West Germany
17:00 CEST	Rahn 7'; Heidemann 43'; Krämer 57'	(Report)	Trimhold 62'	Stadium: Wedaustadion; Attendance: 36,000; Referee: Spiewak

7 September 1963 3	Eintracht Frankfurt	2–3	1. FC Nürnberg	Frankfurt, West Germany
16:30	Stein 8'; Huberts 82' (pen.)	(Report)	Müller 14', 77'; Morlock 46'	Stadium: Waldstadion; Attendance: 55,000; Referee: Handwerker

14 September 1963 4	Hamburger SV	3–0	Eintracht Frankfurt	Hamburg, West Germany
16:30 CEST	Seeler 3', 53'; Dörfel 58'	(Report)		Stadium: Volksparkstadion; Attendance: 65,000; Referee: Weyland

21 September 1963 5	Eintracht Frankfurt	3–0	Eintracht Braunschweig	Frankfurt, West Germany
16:30 CEST	Trimhold 7'; Solz 29', 86'	(Report)		Stadium: Waldstadion; Attendance: 18,000; Referee: Ott

5 October 1963 6	Borussia Dortmund	3–0	Eintracht Frankfurt	Dortmund, West Germany
15:30 CEST	Emmerich 10'; Redder 30'; Konietzka 37'	(Report)		Stadium: Stadion Rote Erde; Attendance: 18,000; Referee: Zimmermann

12 October 1963 7	Eintracht Frankfurt	2–1	1. FC Köln	Frankfurt, West Germany
15:30 CEST	Huberts 16'; Trimhold 32'	(Report)	Müller 42'	Stadium: Waldstadion; Attendance: 41,000; Referee: Fritz

19 October 1963 8	VfB Stuttgart	0–0	Eintracht Frankfurt	Stuttgart, West Germany
15:30 CEST		(Report)		Stadium: Neckarstadion; Attendance: 50,000; Referee: Niemeyer

26 October 1963 9	Hertha BSC	1–3	Eintracht Frankfurt	Berlin, West Germany
15:30 CEST	Faeder 38'	(Report)	Huberts 53', 60'; Solz 85'	Stadium: Olympiastadion; Attendance: 23,500; Referee: Schulenburg

9 November 1963 10	Eintracht Frankfurt	4–2	FC Schalke 04	Frankfurt, West Germany
17:30 CEST	Kress 45'; Solz 55'; Trimhold 58'; Huberts 72'	(Report)	Berz 7'; Herrmann 74'	Stadium: Waldstadion; Attendance: 45,000; Referee: Mathieu

16 November 1963 11	Werder Bremen	4–1	Eintracht Frankfurt	Bremen, West Germany
17:00 CEST	Meyer 5', 44', 78'; Schütz 48'	(Report)	Stein 19'	Stadium: Weserstadion; Attendance: 22,000; Referee: Schömich

23 November 1963 12	Eintracht Frankfurt	5–2	TSV 1860 München	Frankfurt, West Germany
17:00 CEST	Kraus 11'; Horn 18'; Stein 57', 62'; Kress 71'	(Report)	Kraus 14'; Stemmer 69' (pen.)	Stadium: Waldstadion; Attendance: 25,000; Referee: Tschenscher

30 November 1963 13	Eintracht Frankfurt	3–0	Preußen Münster	Frankfurt, West Germany
17:00 CEST	Solz 73'; Bockisch 80' (o.g.); Horn 83'	(Report)		Stadium: Waldstadion; Attendance: 16,000; Referee: Deuschel

7 December 1963 14	1. FC Saarbrücken	0–4	Eintracht Frankfurt	Saarbrücken, West Germany
18:30 CEST		(Report)	Solz 4', 72', 88'; Trimhold 30'	Stadium: Ludwigsparkstadion; Attendance: 22,000; Referee: Schmidt

14 December 1963 15	Eintracht Frankfurt	0–3	Karlsruher SC	Frankfurt, West Germany
14:15 CEST		(Report)	Geisert 33'; Madl 53'; Kentschke 73'	Stadium: Waldstadion; Attendance: 10,500; Referee: Fischer

11 January 1964 16	1. FC Kaiserslautern	1–1	Eintracht Frankfurt	Kaiserslautern, West Germany
14:30 CEST	Reitgaßl 13'	(Report)	Stein 40'	Stadium: Betzenbergstadion; Attendance: 17,000; Referee: Weyland

25 January 1964 17	1. FC Nürnberg	1–0	Eintracht Frankfurt	Nuremberg
14:30 CEST	Dachlauer 12'	(Report)		Stadium: Städtisches Stadion; Attendance: 21,000; Referee: Jacobi

8 February 1964 18	Eintracht Frankfurt	2–2	Meidericher SV	Frankfurt, West Germany
15:30 CEST	Lindner 32'; Stein 82'	(Report)	Krämer 2'; Lotz 65'	Stadium: Waldstadion; Attendance: 12,500; Referee: Schulenburg

15 February 1964 19	Eintracht Braunschweig	0–3	Eintracht Frankfurt	Braunschweig, West Germany
15:30 CEST		(Report)	Huberts 28' (pen.), 50'; Solz 35'	Stadium: Eintracht-Stadion; Attendance: 18,000; Referee: Treichel

22 February 1964 20	Eintracht Frankfurt	2–1	Borussia Dortmund	Frankfurt, West Germany
15:30 CEST	Huberts 26'; Solz 72'	(Report)	Konietzka 70'	Stadium: Waldstadion; Attendance: 40,000; Referee: Regely

29 February 1964 21	1. FC Köln	1–1	Eintracht Frankfurt	Cologne, West Germany
15:30 CEST	Müller (red card) 0'; Benthaus 12'	(Report)	Huberts 81'	Stadium: Kölner Stadion; Attendance: 35,000; Referee: Lutz

7 March 1964 22	Eintracht Frankfurt	3–2	VfB Stuttgart	Frankfurt, West Germany
16:30 CEST	Schämer 21', 38'; Horn 49'	(Report)	Eisele 24'; Höller 85'	Stadium: Waldstadion; Attendance: 20,500; Referee: Reil

14 March 1964 23	Eintracht Frankfurt	4–0	Hertha BSC	Frankfurt, West Germany
16:30 CEST	Rühl 49' (o.g.); Huberts 56', 64'; Solz 84'	(Report)		Stadium: Waldstadion; Attendance: 14,000; Referee: Gusenburger

21 March 1964 24	FC Schalke 04	1–2	Eintracht Frankfurt	Gelsenkirchen, West Germany
16:30 CEST	Karnhof 89'	(Report)	Schämer 48'; Huberts 81'	Stadium: Glückauf-Kampfbahn; Attendance: 25,000; Referee: Ott

30 March 1964 25	Eintracht Frankfurt	2–2	Hamburger SV	Frankfurt, West Germany
15:30 CEST	Huberts 41'; Lindner 83'	(Report)	Seeler 44', 54'	Stadium: Waldstadion; Attendance: 38,000; Referee: Mathieu

4 April 1964 26	Eintracht Frankfurt	7–0	Werder Bremen	Frankfurt, West Germany
15:30 CEST	Huberts 4', 55' (86), pen.' (87); Stein 8', 54', 66'	(Report)		Stadium: Waldstadion; Attendance: 18,000; Referee: Thier

11 April 1964 27	TSV 1860 München	1–1	Eintracht Frankfurt	Munich, West Germany
17:00 CEST	Grosser 53'	(Report)	Kraus 50'	Stadium: Städtisches Stadion an der Grünwalder Straße; Attendance: 30,000; Referee: Handwerker

18 April 1964 28	Preußen Münster	1–3	Eintracht Frankfurt	Münster, West Germany
17:00 CEST	Lulka 26'	(Report)	Solz 13', 87'; Trimhold 38'	Stadium: Preußenstadion; Attendance: 25,000; Referee: Ott

25 April 1964 29	Eintracht Frankfurt	3–1	1. FC Saarbrücken	Frankfurt, West Germany
17:00 CEST	Solz 7'; Kraus 42', 43'	(Report)	Krafczyk 35'	Stadium: Waldstadion; Attendance: 18,000; Referee: Weyland

9 May 1964 30	Karlsruher SC	1–2	Eintracht Frankfurt	Karlsruhe, West Germany
17:00 CEST	Kahn 86'	(Report)	Schämer 40'; Huberts 78'	Stadium: Wildparkstadion; Attendance: 15,000; Referee: Niemeyer

==== League table ====
Pos	Team	Pld	W	D	L	GF	GA	GR	Pts	Qualification or relegation
1	1. FC Köln (C)	30	17	11	2	78	40	1.950	45	Qualification to European Cup preliminary round
2	Meidericher SV	30	13	13	4	60	36	1.667	39	
3	Eintracht Frankfurt	30	16	7	7	65	41	1.585	39	Qualification to Inter-Cities Fairs Cup first round
4	Borussia Dortmund	30	14	5	11	73	57	1.281	33	Qualification to Inter-Cities Fairs Cup first round
5	VfB Stuttgart	30	13	7	10	48	40	1.200	33	Qualification to Inter-Cities Fairs Cup first round

Source: www.dfb.de (in German)
Rules for classification: 1) points; 2) goal average.
(C) Champions

=== DFB-Pokal ===
8 April 1964 First round	VfL Wolfsburg	0–2	Eintracht Frankfurt	Wolfsburg, West Germany
17:00		(Report)	Huberts 36'; Schämer 63'	Stadium: VfL-Stadion; Attendance: 12,000; Referee: Epping

22 April 1964 Second round	Eintracht Frankfurt	6–1	Hessen Kassel	Frankfurt, West Germany
19:30	Kraus 9'; Huberts 15'; Solz 58', 61', 83'; Eigenbrodt 89'	(Report)	Burjan 74'	Stadium: Waldstadion; Attendance: 18,000; Referee: Jacobi

20 May 1964 Quarter-finals	Eintracht Frankfurt	2–1	FC Schalke 04	Frankfurt, West Germany
20:00	Huberts 44', 78'	(Report)	Gerhardt 77'	Stadium: Waldstadion; Attendance: 25,000; Referee: Regely

3 June 1964 Semi-finals	Eintracht Frankfurt	3–1	Hertha BSC	Frankfurt, West Germany
20:00	Trimhold 44'; Stinka 56'; Schämer 77'	(Report)	Rehhagel 73' (pen.)	Stadium: Waldstadion; Attendance: 30,000; Referee: Fritz

==== Final ====
13 June 1964
16:00 CET

Eintracht Frankfurt	0–2	1860 Munich
	Report	Kohlars 43'; Brunnenmeier 63'

Neckarstadion, Stuttgart
Attendance: 45,000
Referee: Johannes Malka (Herten)

== Squad ==
=== Squad and statistics ===
No.	Pos	Nat	Player	Total		Bundesliga		DFB-Pokal	
No.	Pos	Nat	Player	Apps	Goals	Apps	Goals	Apps	Goals
	GK	(West Germany) FRG	Karl Eisenhöfer	3	0	2	0	1	0
	GK	(West Germany) FRG	Egon Loy	32	0	28	0	4	0
	DF	(West Germany) FRG	Hans-Walter Eigenbrodt	17	1	15	0	2	1
	DF	(West Germany) FRG	Willi Herbert	6	0	6	0	0	0
	DF	(West Germany) FRG	Hermann Höfer	34	0	29	0	5	0
	DF	(West Germany) FRG	Richard Weber	5	0	4	0	1	0
	DF	(West Germany) FRG	Josef Weilbächer	2	0	2	0	0	0
	MF	(West Germany) FRG	Jürgen Friedrich	2	0	2	0	0	0
	MF	(West Germany) FRG	Alfred Horn	21	3	20	3	1	0
	MF	(West Germany) FRG	Ludwig Landerer	18	0	13	0	5	0
	MF	(West Germany) FRG	Dieter Lindner	34	2	29	2	5	0
	MF	(West Germany) FRG	Friedel Lutz	23	0	21	0	2	0
	MF	(West Germany) FRG	Eberhard Schymik	1	0	0	0	1	0
	MF	(West Germany) FRG	Dieter Stinka	18	1	14	0	4	1
	MF	(West Germany) FRG	Horst Trimhold	29	7	24	6	5	1
	FW	(Austria) AUT	Wilhelm Huberts	34	23	29	19	5	4
	FW	(West Germany) FRG	Helmut Kraus	19	5	15	4	4	1
	FW	(West Germany) FRG	Richard Kress	17	2	17	2	0	0
	FW	(West Germany) FRG	Lothar Schämer	19	7	14	5	5	2
	FW	(West Germany) FRG	Wolfgang Solz	29	17	27	14	2	3
	FW	(West Germany) FRG	Erwin Stein	22	9	19	9	3	0

=== Transfers ===
==== Transferred in ====
Pos.	Name	Age	EU	Moving from
Midfielder	Horst Trimhold	22	Yes	Schwarz-Weiß Essen
Forward	Helmut Kraus	24	Yes	Schweinfurt 05
Forward	Wilhelm Huberts	25	Yes	AS Roma

==== Transferred out ====
Pos.	Name	Age	EU	Moving to
Forward	Dieter Kraft	23	Yes	Wormatia Worms
Defender	Adolf Bechtold	37	Yes	Retired

== Sources ==
- Matheja, Ulrich (2011). Unsere Eintracht - Eintracht Frankfurt - Die Chronik. Die Werkstatt. ISBN 978-3-89533-750-5.
