= 1963–64 Hertha BSC season =

Hertha BSC
1963–64 season
- Manager: Josef Schneider
- Bundesliga: 14th
- DFB-Pokal: Semi-finals
- Inter-Cities Fairs Cup: First round
- Top goalscorer: League: Helmut Faeder (9); All: Helmut Faeder (9); Carl-Heinz Rühl (9)
- Highest home attendance: 85,411(vs. 1. FC Köln)
- Lowest home attendance: 7,300 (vs. A.S. Roma)

1963–64 Hertha BSC season was the 91st season in club history. Hertha BSC participated in the inaugural Bundesliga season.

== Review and events ==
Hertha BSC participated and finished 14th out of 16 clubs in the inaugural Bundesliga season.

== Match results ==
=== Legend ===
Win Draw Loss

=== Bundesliga ===
Match	Date	Time	Venue	City	Opponent	Result	Attendance	Hertha BSC goalscorers	Source
1	24 August	17:00	Olympic Stadium	West Berlin	1. FC Nürnberg	1–1	52,000	Schimmöller 59' (pen.)	
2	31 August	17:00	Neckarstadion	Stuttgart	VfB Stuttgart	0–2	40,000		
3	7 September	16:30	Olympic Stadium	West Berlin	1. FC Kaiserslautern	2–2	44,572	Rühl 73'; Faeder 79'	
4	14 September	16:30	Wedaustadion	Duisburg	Meidericher SV	3–1	30,000	Faeder 16'; Beyer 73', 83'	
5	21 September	16:30	Olympic Stadium	West Berlin	1. FC Köln	0–3	85,411		
6	5 October	19:00	Volksparkstadion	Hamburg	Hamburger SV	1–5	40,000	Faeder 45'	
7	12 October	15:30	Olympic Stadium	West Berlin	Eintracht Braunschweig	1–2	30,259	Klimaschefski 45'	
8	19 October	15:30	Stadion Rote Erde	Dortmund	Borussia Dortmund	2–7	28,000	Rühl 21'; Altendorff 88'	
9	26 October	15:30	Olympic Stadium	West Berlin	Eintracht Frankfurt	1–3	23,272	Faeder 38'	
10	9 November	17:00	Weserstadion	Bremen	Werder Bremen	2–2	19,000	Klimaschefski 64'; Beyer 85'	
11	16 November	19:00	Glückauf-Kampfbahn	Gelsenkirchen	Schalke 04	0–1	18,000		
12	23 November	14:30	Olympic Stadium	West Berlin	1. FC Saarbrücken	3–2	24,941	Beyer 22'; Faeder 51'; Rühl 88'	
13	30 November	14:30	Olympic Stadium	West Berlin	Karlsruher SC	2–3	24,000	Beyer 20'; Groß 55'	
14	7 December	17:00	Grünwalder Stadion	Munich	TSV 1860 München	2–1	25,000	Waclawiak 48'; Klimaschefski 82'	
15	14 December	17:00	Olympic Stadium	West Berlin	Preußen Münster	2–0	17,215	Steinert 35', 89'	
16	11 January	14:30	Städtisches Stadion	Nuremberg	1. FC Nürnberg	3–2	15,000	Waclawiak 2', 20', 49'	
17	18 January	14:30	Olympic Stadium	West Berlin	VfB Stuttgart	0–2	30,000		
18	8 February	15:30	Stadion am Betzenberg	Kaiserslautern	1. FC Kaiserslautern	0–3	6,000		
19	15 February	15:30	Müngersdorfer Stadion	Cologne	1. FC Köln	1–3	18,000	Schäfer 50' (o.g.)	
20	22 February	15:30	Olympic Stadium	West Berlin	Hamburger SV	1–2	30,000	Faeder 77'	
21	7 March	16:00	Olympic Stadium	West Berlin	Borussia Dortmund	0–0	20,510		
22	14 March	16:30	Waldstadion	Frankfurt	Eintracht Frankfurt	0–4	15,000		
23	27 March	16:30	Olympic Stadium	West Berlin	Meidericher SV	5–2	35,000	Steinert 1', 4'; Altendorff 39', 78'; Rühl 46'	
24	30 March	16:00	Eintracht-Stadion	Braunschweig	Eintracht Braunschweig	1–1	16,000	Faeder 38'	
25	4 April	17:00	Olympic Stadium	West Berlin	Schalke 04	1–0	40,000	Rühl 41'	
26	11 April	17:00	Ludwigsparkstadion	Saarbrücken	1. FC Saarbrücken	0–3	10,000		
27	15 April	20:00	Olympic Stadium	West Berlin	Werder Bremen	5–2	16,000	Borchert 8', 44', 62'; Faeder 48'; Klimaschefski 69'	
28	18 April	17:00	Wildparkstadion	Karlsruhe	Karlsruher SC	1–1	35,000	Altendorff 58'	
29	25 April	17:00	Olympic Stadium	West Berlin	TSV 1860 München	3–1	55,000	Rühl 23'; Altendorff 59'; Steinert 81'	
30	9 May	17:00	Preußenstadion	Münster	Preußen Münster	2–4	3,000	Faeder 24'; Steinert 27'	

=== DFB-Pokal ===
7 April 1964 First round	Meidericher SV	1–2 (a.e.t.)	Hertha BSC	Duisburg
19:30	Lotz 7'		Rühl 57'; Borchert 116'	Stadium: Wedaustadion; Attendance: 13,000; Referee: Max Spindler (Mainz)

22 April 1964 Round of 16	Hertha BSC	4–3	SpVgg Fürth	West Berlin
17:15	Rehhagel 44' (pen.); Steinert 48'; Beyer 55'; Borchert 62'		Perras 37'; Rehhagel 60' (o.g.); Knopf 88'	Stadium: Olympic Stadium; Attendance: 8,000; Referee: Josef Hoffmann (Krefeld)

20 May 1964 Quarter-final	Hertha BSC	4–2	1. FC Köln	West Berlin
17:30	Altendorff 48', 56'; Steinert 60'; Rühl 62'		Schäfer 20', 64'	Stadium: Olympic Stadium; Attendance: 35,000; Referee: Kurt Handwerker (Ketsch)

3 June 1964 Semi-final	Eintracht Frankfurt	3–1	Hertha BSC	Frankfurt
20:00	Trimhold 44'; Stinka 56'; Schämer 77'		Rehhagel 73' (pen.)	Stadium: Waldstadion; Attendance: 30,000; Referee: Helmut Fritz (Oggersheim)

=== Inter-Cities Fairs Cup ===
16 October 1963 First round	Hertha BSC	1–3	A.S. Roma	West Berlin, West Germany
	Rühl 32'		Schütz 21' de Sisti 60'; Leonardi 72'	Stadium: Olympic Stadium; Attendance: 7,300; Referee: Carl W. Hansen (Denmark)

30 November 1963 First round	A.S. Roma	2–0 (5-1 agg.)	Hertha BSC	Rome, Italy
	Schütz 6'; Orlando 70'			Attendance: 8,500

== Player information ==
=== Squad & statistics ===
Squad Season 1963–64
Player					Bundesliga		DFB-Pokal		Inter-Cities Fairs Cup		Totals	
Player	Nat.	Birthday	at Hertha since	Previous club	Matches	Goals	Matches	Goal	Matches	Goals	Matches	Goals
Goalkeepers
Wolfgang Tillich	German	25 November 1939			24	0	0	0	2	0	26	0
Hans-Jürgen Krumnow	German	17 February 1943			6	0	4	0	0	0	10	0
Defenders
Hans-Günter Schimmöller	German	25 September 1935			30	1	4	0	2	0	36	1
Hans Eder	German	14 November 1934	1962	Tennis Borussia Berlin	26	0	4	0	1	0	31	0
Lothar Groß	German	10 February 1940			23	1	4	0	0	0	27	1
Otto Rehhagel	German	9 August 1938	1963	Rot-Weiss Essen	23	0	4	2	2	0	29	2
Klaus Heuer	German	14 September 1935			8	0	1	0	1	0	10	0
Günter Schüler	German	10 February 1934			1	0	0	0	0	0	1	0
Lothar Philipp	German	26 February 1937			0	0	0	0	0	0	0	0
Karl-Heinz Wiegel	German	28 March 1938			0	0	0	0	0	0	0	0
Midfielders
Hans-Joachim Altendorff	German	20 December 1940			28	5	3	2	2	0	33	7
Uwe Klimaschefski	German	11 December 1938			28	4	2	0	2	0	32	4
Helmut Faeder	German	3 July 1935			27	9	4	0	2	0	33	9
Peter Schlesinger	German	8 October 1937			10	0	1	0	2	0	13	0
Forwards
Carl-Heinz Rühl	German	14 November 1939	1963	SC Viktoria 04 Köln	28	6	3	2	2	1	33	9
Lutz Steinert	German	18 March 1939			27	6	3	2	2	0	32	8
Harald Beyer	German	21 September 1939			24	5	2	1	2	0	28	6
Horst Waclawiak	German	1 January 1938			10	4	1	0	0	0	11	4
Eberhard Borchert	German	22 May 1941			7	3	4	2	0	0	11	5
Klaus Scheinig	German	15 September 1941			0	0	0	0	0	0	0	0

== See also ==
- 1963–64 Bundesliga
- 1963–64 Inter-Cities Fairs Cup
- 1963–64 DFB-Pokal
- Hertha BSC
