= 1980–81 Hertha BSC season =

Hertha BSC
1980–81 season
- Manager: Uwe Klimaschefski
- 2. Bundesliga: 3rd
- DFB-Pokal: Semi-final
- Top goalscorer: League: Werner Killmaier (36); All: Werner Killmaier (38)
- Highest home attendance: 71.500 (vs. Werder Bremen)
- Lowest home attendance: 5.400 (vs. Würzburg 04)
Home colours

The 1980–81 season of Hertha BSC started on 6 August against VfB Oldenburg.

== Review and events ==
This was the final season of the original two region 2. Bundesliga, as the DFB sought to integrate the North and South divisions into a single division for the next campaign. This meant 12 clubs from the North would be relegated to the Oberliga. At the end of the season, the club finished third, scoring 123 goals (leading the league), giving up 42 goals (only Werder Bremen gave up fewer), having the best goal difference and missed the playoff by a point.

== Results ==
=== Legend ===
Win Draw Loss

=== 2. Bundesliga Nord ===
Match	Date	Time CET	Venue	City	Opponent	Result F–A	Attendance	Hertha BSC Goalscorers	Source
1	6 August	19:30	Marschweg-Stadion	Oldenburg	VfB Oldenburg	0–2	17.000	—	
2	9 August	15:00	Olympic Stadium	West Berlin	Viktoria Köln	4–0	10.000	Quasten 10' (pen.); Remark 16'; Jüttner 29'; Dickert 33'	
3	16 August	15:00	Südstadion	Cologne	Fortuna Köln	1–3	5.500	Remark 85'	
4	20 August	19:30	Olympic Stadium	West Berlin	Alemannia Aachen	0–1	9.500	—	
5	23 August	15:00	Stadion an der Hamburger Straße	Braunschweig	Eintracht Braunschweig	4–0	14.000	Schlumberger 25'; Remark 44'; Wesseler 54' (pen.); Pagel 89'	
6	27 August	19:30	Olympic Stadium	West Berlin	OSV Hannover	3–2	13.500	Pagel 48'; Remark 60'; Timme 73'	
7	6 September	15:00	Holstein-Stadion	Kiel	Holstein Kiel	1–2	10.000	Killmaier 26'	
8	13 September	15:00	Olympic Stadium	West Berlin	SpVgg Erkenschwick	4–1	8.800	Wesseler 11', 79'; Remark 26'; Mohr 28'	
9	20 September	15:00	Stadion am Hermann-Löns-Weg	Solingen	Union Solingen	3–1	6.000	Remark 2'; Killmaier 59', 61'	
10	26 September	19:00	Olympic Stadium	West Berlin	Preußen Münster	6–0	12.400	Killmaier 16', 46'; Ehrmantraut 18'; Remark 21'; Dickert 67'; Mohr 78'	
11	30 September	19:30	Olympic Stadium	West Berlin	Göttingen 05	4–0	14.400	Killmaier 33', 46'; Wesseler 57' (pen.); Ehrmantraut 83'	
12	7 October	19:30	Georg-Melches Stadion	Essen	Rot-Weiss Essen	4–0	7.000	Ehrmantraut 8'; Killmaier 54'; Remark 54'; Mohr 87'	
13	11 October	15:00	Olympic Stadium	West Berlin	SC Herford	3–1	26.000	Remark 15', 70'; Ehrmantraut 40'	
14	18 November	15:00	Weserstadion	Bremen	Werder Bremen	1–1	19.000	Gruler 75'	
15	25 October	15:00	Olympic Stadium	West Berlin	Rot-Weiß Lüdenscheid	2–0	16.200	Remark 4'; Killmaier 36'	
16	31 October	15:00	Niedersachsenstadion	Hanover	Hannover 96	1–1	12.800	Brück 63'	
17	8 November	15:00	Olympic Stadium	West Berlin	Wattenscheid 09	8–0	13.000	Killmaier 9', 19'; Ehrmantraut 28'; Remark 35', 65', 78', 87'; Laohakul 90'	
18	15 November	15:00	Stadion an der Bremer Brücke	Osnabrück	VfL Osnabrück	0–3	15.600	—	
19	29 November	15:00	Olympic Stadium	West Berlin	Rot-Weiß Oberhausen	4–2	12.800	Killmaier 20', 83'; Dickert 69' (pen.); Stöhr 64'	
20	19 December	19:00	Olympic Stadium	West Berlin	Tennis Borussia Berlin	2–0	44.000	Remark 35'; Wesseler 73'	
21	21 December	15:00	Stadion am Hünting	Bocholt	1. FC Bocholt	3–0	7.000	Ehrmantraut 28'; Gruler 60'; Killmaier 60'	
22	3 January	15:00	Olympic Stadium	West Berlin	VfB Oldenburg	2–0	10.000	Remark 26'; Killmaier 56'	
23	10 January	15:00	Sportpark Höhenberg	Cologne	Viktoria Köln	3–0	6.500	Dickert 62'; Okudera 82'; Remark 88'	
24	25 January	15:00	Tivoli	Aachen	Alemannia Aachen	1–4	18.000	Dickert 14'	
25	8 February	15:00	Olympic Stadium	West Berlin	1. FC Bocholt	5–0	10.500	Gruler 26'; Dickert 30' (pen.); Killmaier 42', 83'; Mohr 77'	
26	15 February	15:00	Mommsenstadion	West Berlin	Tennis Borussia Berlin	4–1	26.000	Killmaier 2'; Gruler 67'; Mohr 87'; Schütte 90' (o.g.)	
27	21 February	15:00	Olympic Stadium	West Berlin	Holstein Kiel	5–1	9.000	Dickert 20' (pen.); Ehrmantraut 48'; Pagel 64'; Remark 78', 86'	
28	7 March	15:00	Stimbergstadion	Oer-Erkenschwick	SpVgg Erkenschwick	4–1	5.000	Jüttner 39'; Okudera 53'; Killmaier 70', 71'	
29	11 March	19:00	Olympic Stadium	West Berlin	Fortuna Köln	5–1	9.100	Dickert 4', 15'; Killmaier 45', 70', 77'	
30	14 March	15:00	Olympic Stadium	West Berlin	Union Solingen	4–2	13.700	Killmaier 12'; Okudera 46', 90'; Dickert 89'	
31	21 March	15:00	Preußenstadion	Münster	Preußen Münster	0–1	8.500	—	
32	28 March	15:00	Sportplatz an der Benzstraße	Göttingen	Göttingen 05	2–1	5.000	Mohr 31'; Gruler 83'	
33	11 April	15:00	Friedrich-Ludwig-Jahn-Stadion	Herford	SC Herford	5–0	5.000	Remark 14'; Wesseler 40' (pen.); Killmaier 58', 64'; Ehrmantraut 68'	
34	16 April	20:15	Olympic Stadium	West Berlin	Werder Bremen	1–2	71.500	Okudera 26'	
35	20 April	20:15	Nattenberg-Stadion	Lüdenscheid	Rot-Weiß Lüdenscheid	3–1	3.500	Killmaier 24', 47'; Wesseler 30' (pen.)	
36	25 April	15:00	Olympic Stadium	West Berlin	Hannover 96	1–0	18.700	Killmaier 66'	
37	1 May	15:00	Lohrheidestadion	Bochum	Wattenscheid 09	1–0	7.600	Mohr 40'	
38	5 May	17:30	Olympic Stadium	West Berlin	VfL Osnabrück	2–0	18.000	Killmaier 5'; Wesseler 85'	
39	9 May	15:00	Niederrheinstadion	Oberhausen	Rot-Weiß Oberhausen	6–1	2.000	Mohr 26'; Ehrmantraut 33', 44'; Wesseler 42'; Okudera 75'; Killmaier 85'	
40	16 May	15:00	Olympic Stadium	West Berlin	Eintracht Braunschweig	2–4	69.000	Remark 15'; Killmaier 50'	
41	23 May	19:00	Olympic Stadium	West Berlin	Rot-Weiss Essen	3–2	11.400	Killmaier 11', 25'; Okudera 86'	
42	30 May	15:00	Oststadtstadion	Hanover	OSV Hannover	6–0	2.500	Killmaier 7', 18'; Mohr 26'; Okudera 41'; Wesseler 51'; Quasten 57' (pen.)	

=== DFB-Pokal ===
30 August 1980 First Round	Hertha BSC	3–1	Holstein Kiel	West Berlin
		Match Report		Stadium: Olympic Stadium; Attendance: 8.000; Referee: Klaus-Peter Zittrich

3 October 1980 Second Round	Hertha BSC	4–1	Würzburg 04	West Berlin
CET		Match Report		Stadium: Olympic Stadium; Attendance: 5.400; Referee: Roth

22 November 1980 Third Round	Hertha BSC	4–1	Darmstadt 98	West Berlin
		Match Report		Stadium: Olympic Stadium; Attendance: 22.000; Referee: Friedrich Retzmann

10 February 1981 Round of 16	Hertha BSC	5–1	Bayer Uerdingen	West Berlin
		Match Report		Stadium: Olympic Stadium; Attendance: 24.500; Referee: Udo Horeis

28 February 1981 Quarter-Final	Hertha BSC	2–1	Fortuna Düsseldorf	West Berlin
		Match Report		Stadium: Olympic Stadium; Attendance: 48.000; Referee: Max Klauser

4 April 1981 Semi-Final	Eintracht Frankfurt	1–0	Hertha BSC	Frankfurt
		Match Report		Stadium: Waldstadion; Attendance: 26.000; Referee: Wilfried Heitmann

== Player information ==
=== Transfers ===
In		Out	
Player	Transferred from	Player	Transferred to
Horst Ehrmantraut	Eintracht Frankfurt	Henrik Agerbeck	
Walter Gruler	FC 08 Homburg	Hans-Jürgen Baake	
Robert Jüttner		Rainer Blechschmidt	
Werner Killmaier	ESV Ingolstadt	Hans-Joachim Förster	
Jürgen Mohr	1. FC Köln	Bernd Gersdorff	
Yasuhiko Okudera	1. FC Köln	Wolfgang Kleff	Borussia Mönchengladbach
Peter Pagel		Uwe Kliemann	Arminia Bielefeld
Gregor Quasten	FC 08 Homburg	Dietmar Krämer	
Edmund Stöhr	MTV Ingolstadt	Dieter Nüssing	
Frank Voihs		Jürgen Milewski	Hamburger SV
Lothar Wesseler	Wormatia Worms	Hans-Günther Plücken	Bayer Uerdingen
Uwe Klimaschefski	FC 08 Homburg	Ole Rasmussen	
Jochem Ziegert	Tennis Borussia Berlin	Wolfgang Sidka	TSV 1860 München
		Michael Sziedat	Eintracht Frankfurt
		Michael Toppel	
		Engin Verel	
		Christian Werner	TSV 1860 München
		Hans-Jürgen Wittelsberger	
		Helmut Kronsbein	
		Thorsten Schlumberger	Tennis Borussia Berlin

=== Roster and statistics ===
- Sources
  - League:
  - DFB-Pokal:

Squad Season 1980–81
Player	Nat.	Birthday	at Hertha since	Previous club	2. BL matches	2. BL goals	Cup matches	Cup goals	Total matches	Total goals
Goalkeepers
Gregor Quasten	German	10 March 1952	1980	FC 08 Homburg	42	2	5	0	47	2
Manfred Werner	German	2 February 1951	1976	—	0	0	1	0	1	0
Defenders
Walter Gruler	German	24 August 1951	1980	FC 08 Homburg	42	5	5	0	47	5
Horst Ehrmantraut	German	11 July 1955	1980	Eintracht Frankfurt	41	10	6	3	47	13
Holger Brück	German	30 September 1947	1972	Hessen Kassel	40	1	5	0	45	1
Dieter Timme	German	23 September 1956	1979	—	21	1	4	0	25	1
Jochem Ziegert	German	25 July 1954	1981	Tennis Borussia Berlin	17	0	3	0	20	0
Jürgen Diefenbach	German	27 March 1956	1974	—	17	0	3	0	20	0
Frank Voihs	German	27 March 1956	1980		3	0	2	0	5	0
Midfielders
Lothar Wesseler	German	21 January 1954	1980	Wormatia Worms	40	10	5	2	45	12
Werner Killmaier	German	21 April 1955	1980	ESV Ingolstadt	39	36	5	2	44	38
Yasuhiko Okudera	Japanese	12 March 1952	1980	1. FC Köln	25	8	5	0	30	8
Witthaya Hloagune	Thai	1 February 1954	1979		19	1	2	0	21	1
Robert Jüttner	German	24 November 1959	1980	—	18	2	2	0	20	2
Forwards
Thomas Remark	German	5 October 1958	1978	—	40	22	6	7	46	29
Pierre Dickert	German	3 August 1960	1979	—	38	10	5	2	43	12
Jürgen Mohr	German	18 August 1958	1980	1. FC Köln	34	9	6	0	40	9
Edmund Stöhr	German	17 September 1956	1980	MTV Ingolstadt	33	1	4	0	37	1
Thorsten Schlumberger	German	29 October 1960	1979		12	1	1	0	13	1
Peter Pagel	German	24 February 1956	1980	—	9	3	3	1	12	4
Paul Dörflinger	German	23 January 1955	1980	MSV Duisburg	3	0	2	0	5	0
