= Gregor Quasten =

German footballer (1952–2022)

- Quasten in the 1982–83 season

Personal information
- Full name: Gregor Quasten
- Date of birth: 3 October 1952
- Place of birth: Mönchengladbach, North Rhine-Westphalia, West Germany
- Date of death: 4 November 2004 (aged 52)
- Height: 1.81 m (5 ft 11 in)
- Position: Goalkeeper

Youth career
- ???–1971: PSV Mönchengladbach

Senior career*
Years	Team	Apps	(Gls)
1970–1975	Borussia Mönchengladbach		
1975–1980	FC Homburg	185	(4)
1980–1984	Hertha BSC		
1984–1987	Waldhof Mannheim		
1987–1988	FC Homburg		
1988	SV Edenkoben		
- * Club domestic league appearances and goals

Gregor Quasten (3 October 1952 – 4 November 2004) was a German footballer. He played as a goalkeeper for various clubs including Borussia Mönchengladbach, Homburg and Hertha BSC. His career highlights included him being part of the winning squads of the 1972–73 DFB-Pokal, 1974–75 Bundesliga and the 1974–75 UEFA Cup as a reserve player for Borussia Mönchengladbach.

== Club career ==
Quasten began his football career at PSV Mönchengladbach as a youth. For the 1971–72 Bundesliga, he was transferred from the Borussia youth team to the professional squad of Borussia Mönchengladbach, where he was another reserve goalkeeper for coach Hennes Weisweiler team behind Wolfgang Kleff and behind Bernd Schrage. From the 1973–74 Bundesliga, he was Kleff's reserve but did not make any competitive appearances. In 1975, he moved to FC Homburg for the 1975–76 2. Bundesliga Süd. He made his 2. Bundesliga debut on 9 August 1975 under coach Uwe Klimaschefski in a 1–1 home draw against SpVgg Bayreuth. Like fellow striker Harald Diener, he played all 38 round-robin games and Homburg finished 3rd in the final table. The men around goalkeeper Quasten defied eventual champions and Bundesliga newcomers 1. FC Saarbrücken to a 1:1 draw in the home game on 2 May 1976, in front of 20,000 spectators in the Waldstadion. Against VfB Stuttgart, which competed with players such as Dragan Holcer, Hermann Ohlicher, Dieter Brenninger and Dieter Hoeneß, the Homburg team managed two victories of 1-0 and 2–0. Due to the offside trap used by coach Klimaschefski, Quasten often exercised risky excursions out of the goal area to save the day. In addition to Quasten and Diener, top performers were Horst Ehrmantraut, Manfred Lenz and Albert Müller. In the rounds of 1976–77 and 1977–78 editions of the 2. Bundesliga, the outsider club from Homburg would hold the impressive ranks of with 4th and 3rd place in the 2. Bundesliga with Quasten being undisputed goalkeeper of the team.

Quasten played 185 second division games for Homburg, in which he scored four goals. In 1980 he joined Hertha BSC; Coach Klimaschefski had signed in Berlin and also took Walter Gruler and Horst Ehrmantraut with him. Quasten stood between the posts for Hertha for four years and played his first Bundesliga game on 17 August 1982 in the 3–1 defeat against Borussia Dortmund. As runners-up of the 2. Bundesliga, Quasten and colleagues had been promoted for the 1982–83 Bundesliga and the former Gladbach reserve had guarded the goal of the promoted team in 37 league games with 1 goal. Before the promotional playoffs, he had played six games in the 1981 Intertoto Cup against IFK Göteborg, Bohemians Praha and Grasshoppers Zurich. In total, he played 147 times for Hertha BSC.

In his last season with Hertha BSC under coach Martin Luppen, things were less than desirable as Hertha finished 11th in the 2. Bundesliga. His final notable performance with the club would occur on 2 May 1984 where a collision with Manfred Drexler would result in a broken ankle for the latter.

This left Quasten was unemployed for three months in the summer of 1984. He then received a new contract with SV Waldhof Mannheim, where he took on the role of deputy behind regular goalkeeper Uwe Zimmermann and played a total of 13 games in three rounds. In the 1987–88 season, he spent another year at FC Homburg with eight more Bundesliga appearances, where he was a reserve behind Klaus Scherer. From 1988 he ended his career with SV Edenkoben.

Quasten played 55 Bundesliga games and 299 games in the 2nd division. Although he was a goalkeeper, he scored seven league goals, including from the penalty spot.

== Death ==
Gregor Quasten died of cancer on November 4, 2004, at the age of 52.
