= Jack Shaver =

Canadian theologian and clergyman

- Born: Michael John Victor Shaver; 1918; Fort William, Ontario
- Died: 2001 (aged 82–83); Vancouver
- Education: BA, 2 Honorary Doctorates
- Occupation: Minister of the United Church of Canada
- Title: Reverend
- Spouse: Dorothy Hamlet
- Children: 5
- Parent(s): Rev. and Mrs James M. Shaver

Michael John Victor Shaver (1918-2001), known as Jack Shaver, was a theologian and clergyman of the United Church of Canada.

== Life and career ==
Shaver was born in Fort William, Ontario (Thunder Bay) in 1918 – the second son of the Rev. and Mrs. James M. Shaver. When he was two years old, his father succeeded J.S. Woodsworth as Superintendent at All Peoples' Mission – first a Methodist, and then a United Church institution in the north end of Winnipeg. The family lived in the manse next door to the Mission, serving the immigrant population of the region in the spirit of the social gospel movement. Shaver graduated from United College (now the University of Winnipeg) and was ordained by Manitoba Conference on July 23, 1942. He married Dorothy Hamlet of Fort William in 1944. They have five children.

For the first 10 years, Shaver served two rural charges in Manitoba Conference (Murillo and Sidney-Austin), then seven years at Fort Garry United Church in suburban Winnipeg. It was during this period that his theological interest and skills flourished – nurtured by a small group of clergy regularly meeting to debate the writing of Tillich, Aulén, Bultmann, and Bonhoeffer.

Shaver's next placement was in Vancouver in 1959 where he served 10 years as the first United Church chaplain at the University of British Columbia. His unique blend of ‘God talk', affirmation of ambiguity, and commitment to even the most radical Other, made him the ideal person for the hippies, draft-resistors, anti-war advocates, and disenchanted of the 1960s. It was during this period that he integrated and developed insights from the existentialists and the social psychology of Martin Buber, Erik Erikson, and Norman O. Brown into his writing and presentations. It was during this period that he became a regular panelist on a radio program initiated by Roy Bonisteel.

He left the campus ministry in 1969 and spent three years on the Metropolitan Council – an inter-presbytery urban council in BC Conference (of the United Church of Canada), where he acted as advocate, counselor, and janitor to the young people drifting through the Vancouver hostel and crash pad scene. He spent his final 10 years in the ministry on the staff of First United Church, a mission institution in downtown Eastside Vancouver. He was elected President of the BC Conference in May 1979.

Shaver received two honorary doctorates; from the University of Winnipeg (1980) and the Vancouver School of Theology (1982).

"Jack Shaver was one of the most insightful and iconoclastic theological thinkers of his generation in Canada. His life spanned most of the twentieth century Canadian landscape; his thought reflected fundamental shifts in Canadian social consciousness; his work undoubtedly contributed to the spiritual ethos of this country. His astute analyses, penetrating interventions, iconoclastic style, and enigmatic personality left an indelible imprint on all who encountered him."
