= Trimhold =

Trimhold is a surname. Notable people with the surname include:

- Holger Trimhold (born 1953), German footballer, brother of Horst
- Horst Trimhold (1941–2021), German footballer
