= Tillich =

Tillich is a German (and West Slavic) surname. It may refer to:

- Ernst Tillich (1910–1985), German theologian
- Paul Tillich (1886–1965), German-American Protestant theologian
  - Paul Tillich Park, New Harmony, Indiana, USA
- Stanislaw Tillich (born 1959), Sorbian German politician, Minister-President of Saxony
- Wolfgang Tillich (1939–1988), German footballer
