= Dieter Timme =

German footballer (1956–2024)

- Timme with Hertha BSC

Personal information
- Date of birth: 23 September 1956
- Place of birth: Werder an der Havel, Bezirk Potsdam, East Germany
- Date of death: 24 October 2024 (aged 68)
- Height: 1.82 m (6 ft 0 in)
- Position: Defender

Senior career*
Years	Team	Apps	(Gls)
1976–1979	Hertha BSC Amateure		
1979–1988	Hertha BSC	234	(16)

Managerial career
- 1989–1994: Hertha BSC (A-Youth)
- 1995–1996: Tennis Borussia Berlin (Assistant coach)
- 1996–1997: FSV Velten
- 1999–2000: Hallescher FC
- 2003–2004: SV Lichtenberg 47
- 2009–2010: Torgelower SV Greif
- 2012: Brandenburger SC Süd 05
- 2013: SV Babelsberg 03
- * Club domestic league appearances and goals

Dieter Timme (23 September 1956 – 24 October 2024) was a German football player and manager. He exclusively played as defender for Hertha BSC throughout his career as a footballer and would serve as a manager for various clubs.

== Club career ==
In his youth, Timme played exclusively for Hertha BSC, as he later did as a professional. Even as a teenager, he was allowed to train with the senior team from time to time with the permission of president Wolfgang Holst. However, Timme would not play an official match until the 1st matchday of the 1979–80 Oberliga Berlin, when he was in the starting line-up in the 0–0 draw against Eintracht Braunschweig. After the 2–1 defeat against Bayer Leverkusen on Matchday 2, Timme was not fielded by Kuno Klötzer and his successor Hans Eder initially wouldn not allow Timme to play. In the second half of the season, Helmut Kronsbein became coach for the club, but he couldn not avoid the surprising relegation. Under Uwe Klimaschefski, Timme then became a regular player in the 2. Bundesliga. However, they would only reach third place behind Werder Bremen and Eintracht Braunschweig, narrowly missing out on qualification for the promotion play-offs.

In the following season, Timme was a regular under Klimaschefski, as despite his dismissal as coach from the first half of the season, would still continue as a regular under Georg Gawliczek, who led Hertha back to the top-flight in second place behind Schalke 04. By this point, Timme was made a member of the starting XI for Hertha Berlin but by the end of the 1982–83 Bundesliga, the club would once again be relegated to the 1983–84 2. Bundesliga at dead last. Following relegation, the club had looked for direct promotion but by the first half of the season, had realized that this was not a realistic goal and so, turned their efforts by hiring Martin Luppen as the new head coach. Under Gawliczek, Timme had played the first 17 games of the season, but under Luppen, the defender did not play a game until the penultimate matchday. Since the season's goal was missed, Hertha tried a new start for the 1983–84 2. Bundesliga and installed Uwe Kliemann as coach with Timme playing 36 out of 38 games this season.

At his first coaching station, the former central defender Kliemann was "not given enough time," according to Dieter Timme. And so in the winter of 1985, Hans Eder took over as manager again for six weeks. Subsequently, from January 1986, the globetrotter Rudi Gutendorf became the new coach. Even though Timme accused him of having "no idea about football or training work", he retained his status as a regular player, which was probably also due to his position as a "mood maker" in the team according to Pierre Dickert. Gutendorf was dismissed in April of the same year and Jürgen Sundermann was tasked with the impossible task of preventing relegation in the 1985–86 2. Bundesliga. However, he would not succeed and Hertha BSC was relegated to the 1986–87 Oberliga Berlin for the first time in the club's history. Within the third tier of German football, Hertha won confidently but lost against BVL 08 Remscheid and SV Meppen. However, Timme would play significantly less of a role in the club with his last season only having played five matches during the regular season with an extra six in the promotional playoffs.

In total, he would play in 234 matches with 16 goals being scored with Timme being named captain at some point.

== Managerial career ==
Timme began his career as a coach in 1989 at Hertha BSc as coach of the A-Youth, where he stayed until 1994 and would coach future Bundesliga players such as Christian Fiedler, Carsten Ramelow and Andreas Schmidt. After a year's break, Timme began his work as assistant coach of Tennis Borussia Berlin, but "preferred to work as a responsible coach" and thus took up the offer of FSV Velten after one season. With FSV, he failed to stay in the league for the 1996–97 Regionalliga and the club was relegated alongside SC Charlottenburg. After relegation, Velten filed for bankruptcy and Timme became unemployed for almost two years until he accepted the offer from Hallescher FC. He immediately led HFC to victory in the Verbandsliga and was responsible for the club being promoted back for the 2000–01 NOFV-Oberliga. Despite being offered a new contract, Timme declined. He would lead the youth team to a Berlin championship during the 1991–1992 season, something not achieved since 1968.

It was not until January 2003 that Dieter Timme received a new job as coach of SV Lichtenberg 47. There he immediately secured relegation in the Oberliga. Due to the continuing downturn in the 2004/05 season, Timme was dismissed after the first half of the season. In the summer of 2005, he completed a six-month training as a football teacher at the German Sport University Cologne. At the same time, he began working as a player observer for the agency Rogon/Sportmanagement W. Farian.

Timme had to give up this post when he became the new coach at Torgelower SV Greif in January 2009. From the very beginning, he would have disagreements with the club's management and left the club in April 2010.

On 22 April 2012, he took over the coaching position at the Oberliga club Brandenburger SC Süd 05 from Brandenburg an der Havel. Here he coached the Oberliga team until the winter break. His contract was terminated on 31 December 2012. On 29 April 2013, the third division club SV Babelsberg 03 introduced Timme as the new interim coach until the end of the season. He was supposed to support Almedin Civa, who lacked the necessary license.

== Later life and death ==
Following his managerial career, he would continue to hold his former club of Hertha BSC in high regard to where he was invited to a special event dedicated to the club's history as a speaker in April 2024. He died on 24 October 2024, after a long illness, at the age of 68.
