= Roy Bonisteel =

Canadian journalist

- Born: Roy Earnest Bonisteel; 29 May 1930; Ameliasburg, Ontario, Canada
- Died: 16 August 2013 (aged 83); Johnstown, Quinte West, Ontario, Canada
- Occupation: journalist
- Awards: Order of Canada

Roy Earnest Bonisteel, CM (29 May 1930 – 16 August 2013) was a Canadian journalist and, from 1967 to 1989, host of the CBC Television program Man Alive.

== Life and career ==
Bonisteel was born in Ameliasburg, Ontario and was a seventh generation native of the Quinte West region. He began his journalism career with newspapers in Belleville and Trenton, the Belleville Intelligencer and Trentonian, respectively. In 1951, he began his broadcasting career in radio in the city of Belleville, Ontario, working at CJBQ. From this start he moved to CKTB radio in St. Catharines, Ontario in 1953. After 12 years at CKTB he left in 1964 to try for a job at a different station. He failed to obtain this job, so Bonisteel moved into religious broadcasting. (Canadian broadcasting regulation at the time required radio stations to broadcast religious shows.)

He entered into an agreement with the United Church of Canada to produce a 15-minute program titled Checkpoint. His efforts led this show to be syndicated across Canada. This then led to a position as director of broadcast for the United Church in Vancouver in 1965. He received an appointment as head of ecumenical radio operations for the Anglican, Roman Catholic and United churches, in Vancouver, the first person to have such an assignment. Bonisteel started a religious open-line radio program titled God Talk on CKWX, with a panel consisting of Rev. Walter Donald, Fr. John Shields and Rev. Jack Shaver with the occasional guest.

In 1967, Bonisteel met Leo Rampen, an executive producer at CBC Television. Rampen was looking for a host for Man Alive, a new series that would explore man's religious dimensions, and chose Bonisteel for the job. In the next 22 years, Bonisteel would go on to interview Malcolm Muggeridge, Elie Wiesel, Mother Teresa, 14th Dalai Lama, Hans Küng and many others. Memorable shows include broadcasts from Belfast (1974), Africa (1975), and May's Miracle (the story of May, Joe and Leslie Lemke).

He summed up his philosophy in a speech at the 80th anniversary celebration of Grace United Church in Weyburn, Saskatchewan: "We are moulded into a materialist world where we do a lot of eating, drinking and making merry until we ask the basic questions 'Who am I? Where am I going? What is our purpose in life?'".

After retiring from the CBC, Bonisteel hosted panel discussions on death and bereavement as part of the TVOntario anthology series Saying Goodbye, and later served as a citizenship judge for seven years. In 1999 and 2000, Bonisteel served as director of journalism and communication at the University of Regina.

Bonisteel died the morning of 16 August 2013 from cancer at his home in Johnstown, Quinte West Ontario; he was 83. He is survived by daughters Lesley and Mandy Bonisteel and son Steve Bonisteel and by nine grandchildren and three great-grandchildren.

== Awards and honours ==
A winner of two awards of excellence in broadcast journalism, Bonisteel also received six honorary doctorates, including an honorary Doctorate of Letters from Laurentian University in Sudbury, and an honorary Doctorate of Divinity from Queen's University in Kingston. In 1994, he was made a Member of the Order of Canada. Bonisteel was also a recipient of the Canada 125 Medal in 1992, the Distinguished Canadian Award from the University of Regina in 1994, two ACTRA Awards and the Gordon Sinclair Award for excellence in broadcast journalism and award for "best television host in Canada."

== Published works ==
=== Books ===
- Man Alive the Human Journey, c. 1983, Collins Publishers ISBN 0-00-217102-3
- In Search of Man Alive, 1980, Collins Publishers ISBN 0-00-216815-4
- All Things Considered, 1997, Doubleday Canada, ISBN 0-385-25599-3
- There was a time, 1991, Doubleday Canada, ISBN 0-385-25298-6

=== Video ===
- Circle of Witches
- All their Own
- May's Miracle
