= Horacio Barrionuevo =

Argentine former football defender

Personal information
- Full name: Horacio Óscar Barrionuevo
- Date of birth: June 6, 1939 (age 87)
- Place of birth: Junín, Argentina
- Position: Defender

Senior career*
Years	Team	Apps	(Gls)
1959	Central Córdoba		
1959–1960	Sarmiento		
1961	Tigre		
1962–1963	Argentinos Juniors	40	(7)
1964	Vélez Sársfield		
1965–1966	Sarmiento		
1966–1967	Nice	23	(5)
- * Club domestic league appearances and goals

Horacio Barrionuevo (born 6 June 1939) is an Argentine former football defender.
