= Peter Pagel =

German footballer

Personal information
- Full name: Peter Pagel
- Date of birth: 24 February 1956
- Place of birth: Germany
- Date of death: 12 December 2010 (aged 54)
- Place of death: Germany
- Position: Striker

Senior career*
Years	Team	Apps	(Gls)
1975	Tennis Borussia Berlin	1	(0)
1980–1981	Hertha BSC	9	(3)
1981–1982	FC 08 Homburg	21	(5)
	Spandauer BC	356	(290)
- * Club domestic league appearances and goals

Peter Pagel (24 February 1956 – 12 December 2010) was a professional German footballer.

Pagel made a total of 10 appearances in the 2. Bundesliga for Tennis Borussia Berlin and Hertha BSC during his playing career.

Pagel died suddenly at the age of 54.
