= Klaus Bockisch =

German footballer and coach

Personal information
- Date of birth: 5 December 1938
- Place of birth: Upper Silesia, Weimar Republic
- Date of death: 19 November 2018 (aged 79)
- Place of death: Donaueschingen, Germany
- Position: Defender

Youth career
- Lüner SV

Senior career*
Years	Team	Apps	(Gls)
1959–1960	Lüner SV		
1960–1967	Preußen Münster		
1967–1972	FC 08 Villingen		

Managerial career
- BSV 07 Schwenningen
- * Club domestic league appearances and goals

Klaus Bockisch (5 December 1938 – 19 November 2018) was a German professional football player and coach.

== Career ==
Born in Upper Silesia, Bockisch began his career with Lüner SV before moving to SC Preußen Münster in 1959. He played for them in the inaugural season of the Bundesliga, making 30 appearances, and later played for FC 08 Villingen, whom he later also coached. He also coached BSV 07 Schwenningen, FV St. Georgen and FC Klengen.

== Later life and death ==
Bockisch was married with a daughter, and lived in the village of Villingen. He died in hospital in Donaueschingen on 19 November 2018, aged 79.
