= Hans-Jürgen Krumnow =

German footballer

Personal information
- Date of birth: 17 February 1943
- Date of death: 11 July 2015 (aged 72)
- Place of death: Bad Bodenteich, Germany
- Height: 1.83 m (6 ft 0 in)
- Position: Goalkeeper

Senior career*
Years	Team	Apps	(Gls)
1961–1969	Hertha BSC	70	(0)
1967–1969	Blau-Weiß 90 Berlin		
- * Club domestic league appearances and goals

Hans-Jürgen Krumnow (17 February 1943 – 11 July 2015) was a German footballer. He played the entirety of his career in West Berlin for Hertha BSC and Blau-Weiß 90 Berlin.
