= Ceyhan Yazar =

Turkish footballer

Personal information
- Date of birth: February 1, 1944 (age 82)
- Place of birth: Antalya, Turkey
- Height: 5 ft 7 in (1.70 m)
- Position: Forward

Senior career*
Years	Team	Apps	(Gls)
1961	Somaspor		
1961–1968	Göztepe		
1970	Rochester Lancers	7	(0)
1971	New York Cosmos	9	(2)
Total		16	(2)
- * Club domestic league appearances and goals

Ceyhan Yazar (born February 1, 1944), is a former Turkish soccer player who played in the NASL.

== Career statistics ==
=== Club ===
Club	Season	League			Cup		Other		Total	
Club	Season	Division	Apps	Goals	Apps	Goals	Apps	Goals	Apps	Goals
Rochester Lancers	1970	NASL	7	0	0	0	0	0	7	0
New York Cosmos	1971	NASL	9	2	0	0	0	0	9	2
Career total			16	2	0	0	0	0	16	2
