= Hans-Walter Eigenbrodt =

German footballer

Personal information
- Full name: Hans-Walter Eigenbrodt
- Date of birth: 4 August 1935
- Place of birth: Germany
- Date of death: 29 March 1997 (aged 61)
- Position: Central defender

Youth career
- 1948–1955: Eintracht Frankfurt

Senior career*
Years	Team	Apps	(Gls)
1955–1965	Eintracht Frankfurt	94	(1)
- * Club domestic league appearances and goals

Hans-Walter Eigenbrodt (4 August 1935 – 29 March 1997) was a German football player. The defender won with Eintracht Frankfurt the German championship in 1959 and reached with the club the legendary 1960 European Cup Final against Real Madrid.

The central defender joined Eintracht Frankfurt as a youth in 1948 and should stay until 1965 when an injury forced him to retire.

In 1959 he won with Eintracht the German championship after defeating local rivals Kickers Offenbach in a dramatic final 5–3 after extra time. In the semi-finals of the European Champions' Cup 1959–60 Eintracht stunningly eliminated Rangers FC with 6–1 and 6–3 and thus reached the final which took place at Hampden Park in Glasgow. There 135 000 spectators witnessed one of the arguably greatest matches in European Cup history when Real Madrid defeated the Eagles 7–3.

Eigenbrodt, who for most part of his career also worked as a commercial employee because to the semi-professional status of German football in this era, also played 15 matches in the Bundesliga between 1963 and 1965.

Later he worked as youth coach with Eintracht. In 1977 the Under 17 team coached by him won Germany's first championship for this age group.

He died 29 March 1997, aged 61.

== Honours ==
- German championship: 1958–59
- European Cup: runners-up 1959–60
- Oberliga Süd: 1958–59; runners-up 1960–61, 1961–62
- DFB-Pokal: runners-up 1963–64
