= Pierre Dorsini =

French football player and manager (1934–2023)

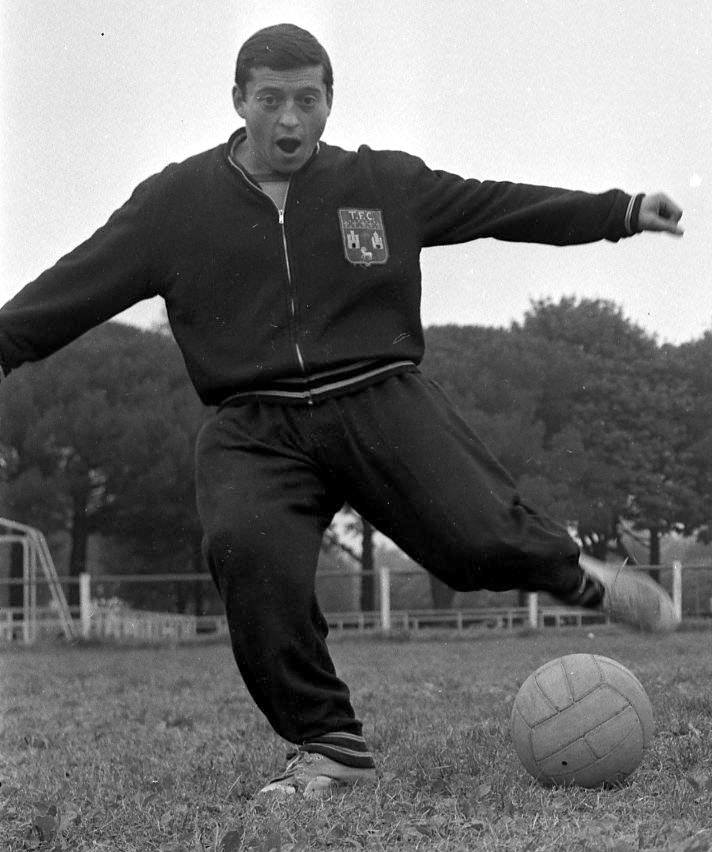
- Dorsini in 1962

Personal information
- Date of birth: 23 April 1934
- Place of birth: Villerupt, France
- Date of death: 10 January 2023 (aged 88)
- Place of death: Castelginest, France
- Height: 1.63 m (5 ft 4 in)
- Position: Forward

Senior career*
Years	Team	Apps	(Gls)
1954–1957	Nancy	39	(8)
1957–1967	Toulouse FC	324	(104)
Total		363	(112)

Managerial career
- 1972–1973: Toulouse
- * Club domestic league appearances and goals

Pierre Dorsini (23 April 1934 – 10 January 2023) was a French football player and manager who played as a forward. He played the majority of his career with the now-defunct Toulouse FC, playing in 324 matches and scoring 104 goals.

From 1972 to 1973, he was the manager of Toulouse.
