= Peter Schmidt (footballer) =

Austrian footballer (born 1943)

Personal information
- Date of birth: 3 December 1943 (age 82)
- Height: 1.77 m (5 ft 10 in)
- Position: Forward

Senior career*
Years	Team	Apps	(Gls)
1964–1968	Wiener Sport-Club	71	(16)
1968–1969	1. FC Kaiserslautern	8	(0)
1969–1972	LASK	58	(4)
Total		137	(20)

International career
1966–1967	Austria	2	(0)
- * Club domestic league appearances and goals

Peter Schmidt (born 3 December 1943) is an Austrian former footballer who played as a forward. He made two appearances for the Austria national team from 1966 to 1967.
