= Billy Hainey =

Scottish footballer

Personal information
- Full name: William Hainey
- Date of birth: 16 June 1939 (age 87)
- Place of birth: Paisley, Scotland
- Position: Inside forward

Senior career*
Years	Team	Apps	(Gls)
- Johnstone Burgh
1961–1966	Partick Thistle	111	(28)
1966–1968	Dundee United	46	(8)
	St Mirren	22	(2)
- Portadown

International career
1964	SFL trial v SFA	1	(0)
- * Club domestic league appearances and goals

William Hainey (born 16 June 1939) is a Scottish former professional footballer who played as an inside forward. He played for Partick Thistle, Dundee United, St Mirren and Portadown.

== Early life ==
Billy Hainey was born in Paisley, Renfrewshire, on 16 June 1939.

== Playing career ==
Hainey played junior football for Johnstone Burgh before joining his first senior club, Partick Thistle, in 1961. He made 111 league appearances for Partick before he was sold to Dundee United for £8,000 in March 1966. At the beginning of the 1966–67 season, he became the first ever substitute used by Dundee United in a major competitive match, and also the first substitute to score for the club. In October 1966, Hainey scored Dundee United's first ever goal in European competition, in a 2–1 win over Barcelona in the Fairs Cup. Hainey scored in both ties against Barcelona which is something very few players have ever done. He scored the second goal in the home tie in the 49th minute after Iain Mitchell had scored the opener on the 18th minute in United's 2-0 win at home on Nov 16th 1966 (4-1 on agg).

After losing his place in the Dundee United team, Hainey requested a transfer in October 1967. He was released on a free transfer in April 1968, later signing for St Mirren. He then joined Portadown in Northern Ireland.

Hainey was inducted into the Dundee United Hall of Fame in 2010. He also played alongside Walter Smith at Dallas Tornado.
