= Jim Fleming (footballer, born 1942) =

Scottish footballer (1942–2020)

Personal information
- Full name: James Paterson Fleming
- Date of birth: 7 January 1942
- Place of birth: Fishcross, Scotland
- Date of death: 10 December 2020 (aged 78)
- Position: Left winger

Youth career
- Sauchie

Senior career*
Years	Team	Apps	(Gls)
1958–1960	Partick Thistle	49	(13)
1960–1963	Luton Town	66	(9)
1963–1965	Partick Thistle	45	(10)
1965–1967	Dunfermline Athletic	42	(17)
1967–1969	Heart of Midlothian	46	(9)
1969–1972	Wigan Athletic	107	(34)
1972-1975	Ross County	111	(27)
Total		466	(119)
- * Club domestic league appearances and goals

James Paterson Fleming (7 January 1942 – 10 December 2020) was a Scottish professional footballer, who played for Partick Thistle, Luton Town, Dunfermline Athletic, Heart of Midlothian and Wigan Athletic. Jim left Wigan Athletic and moved into the Scottish Highland Football League with Ross County where Ian McNeil his former Manager at Wigan, was Manager. Jim later in his footballing career became Player Coach with Inverness Clachnacuddin FC, another Highland Football League Club.
