= Wilhelm Huberts =

Austrian footballer (1938–2022)

Willi Huberts
Personal information
- Full name: Wilhelm Huberts
- Date of birth: 22 February 1938
- Place of birth: Voitsberg, Austria
- Date of death: 4 March 2022 (aged 84)
- Height: 1.79 m (5 ft 10 in)
- Position: Midfielder

Youth career
- ASK Voitsberg

Senior career*
Years	Team	Apps	(Gls)
1955–1960	Grazer AK	118	(28)
1961–1962	New York Hungarians		
1962	Roma		
1963–1970	Eintracht Frankfurt	213	(67)
1970–1971	Austria Wien	28	(0)
1971–1975	Grazer AK	60	(0)

International career
1959–1960	Austria	4	(1)

Managerial career
- Kapfenberger SV
- Alpine Donawitz
- 1976–1978: LASK
- * Club domestic league appearances and goals

Wilhelm Huberts (22 February 1938 – 4 March 2022), also known as Willi Huberts, was an Austrian footballer who played as a midfielder.

== Club career ==
Huberts began his career in his hometown with ASK Voitsberg. From there he was transferred to Grazer AK, who got him to the Stadion an der Körösistraße in 1955. Through his immense technical skills and his scoring qualities he became a supporter's favourite in Graz.

When GAK played a couple of friendlies in New York in 1959, two of them against Real Madrid, it caused Huberts who was a midfielder, to finally convince New York Hungarians of the German American Soccer League to sign him in 1960. With this club he won National Challenge Cup (today Lamar Hunt U.S. Open Cup) in 1962.

In 1963 Huberts joined Eintracht Frankfurt in Germany. In this year the Bundesliga was founded and the Eagles from Hesse were a founding member. Huberts was one of only four foreign players in German pro football, and the only Austrian. In the 1960s team of Frankfurt he was a key player. With the jersey number 10 he scored 80 times for the boys from Main.

For the 1970–71 season he returned to Austria and joined Austria Wien and eventually his home club Grazer AK in 1971 and retired in 1975.

== International career ==
Huberts was capped four times for the Austria national team between 1959 and 1960, scoring in his debut in a 2–0 win against Belgium.

With the club change to New York came travel limitations, he was no longer selected for Austria and even when he joined Eintracht Frankfurt he never played again for the national team due to the politics of the clubs not to release foreign players except for big tournaments.

== Personal life ==
Huberts died on 4 March 2022, at the age of 84.

== Honours ==
New York Hungarians

- National Challenge Cup: 1962

Eintracht Frankfurt

- DFB-Pokal: runners-up 1963–64
- UEFA Intertoto Cup: 1966–67

Austria Wien

- Austrian Cup: 1971
