= Horst Ehrmantraut =

German footballer (born 1955)

Personal information
- Date of birth: 11 December 1955 (age 70)
- Place of birth: Homburg-Einöd, Saar Protectorate
- Height: 1.75 m (5 ft 9 in)
- Position: Defender

Youth career
- –1975: SpVgg Einöd

Senior career*
Years	Team	Apps	(Gls)
1975–1979	FC 08 Homburg	131	(13)
1979–1980	Eintracht Frankfurt	13	(0)
1980–1985	Hertha BSC	170	(16)
1985–1988	FC Homburg	70	(3)
Total		384	(32)

Managerial career
- 1990–1991: SpVgg Blau-Weiß 1890 Berlin
- 1991–1996: SV Meppen
- 1997–1998: Eintracht Frankfurt
- 2000–2001: Hannover 96
- 2003: 1. FC Saarbrücken
- 2004–2005: 1. FC Saarbrücken
- * Club domestic league appearances and goals

Horst Ehrmantraut (born 11 December 1955) is a German former professional football player and manager who played as a defender.

== Plastic chair ==
During his time as a manager, Ehrmanntraut was known for sitting on a white plastic chair instead of on the regular bench.
