= Dieter Stinka =

German footballer (born 1937)

Personal information
- Date of birth: 10 August 1937 (age 89)
- Place of birth: Allenstein, Germany
- Position: Midfielder

Youth career
- –1958: 1. FC Gelnhausen

Senior career*
Years	Team	Apps	(Gls)
1958–1966	Eintracht Frankfurt	143	(22)
1966–1968	Darmstadt 98		
1968	FCA Darmstadt		
- * Club domestic league appearances and goals

Dieter Stinka (born 10 August 1937) is a German former footballer who played as a midfielder. With Eintracht Frankfurt he won the German championship in 1959 and reached with the club the 1960 European Cup Final against Real Madrid.

== Career ==
In 1958 Stinka moved to Eintracht Frankfurt, coming from 1. FC Gelnhausen. In his second season at the Eagles, he won the German championship and achieved a runner-up medal in the following season at the European Cup. He played the first three Bundesliga seasons in Frankfurt.

On 3 October 1959, he was called up to the match of the German B national team in Konstanz against Switzerland. Together with Willi Schulz and Ferdinand Wenauer he formed the midfield. Bundestrainer Sepp Herberger called up Eintracht's left midfielder three times for the A national team: Against Belgium in Frankfurt on 8 March 1961, against Northern Ireland in Berlin on 10 May 1961 and against Denmark in Düsseldorf on 20 September 1961 but never received a cap. On his position Horst Szymaniak was seeded since the 1958 FIFA World Cup in Sweden.

The post officer Stinka was a tireless permanent issue in the Eagles' midfield. In 1961 and 1962 he won with Frankfurt the Oberliga Süd runner-up title and appeared in 16 German final round matches. After appearing in the 1965–66 season only four times, Stinka moved to lower class club Darmstadt 98, staying there until 1968. At FCA Darmstadt he announced his retirement.

Later Stinka became assistant and reserve squad coach at Eintracht. In the 1983–84 season, he managed FSV Frankfurt.
