= Helmut Faeder =

German footballer

Personal information
- Full name: Helmut Faeder
- Date of birth: 3 July 1935
- Place of birth: Großwoltersdorf, Germany
- Date of death: 3 August 2014 (aged 79)
- Place of death: Berlin
- Position: Midfielder

Youth career
- SV Buchholz

Senior career*
Years	Team	Apps	(Gls)
1953–1967	Hertha BSC	48	(12)
1967–1973	Hertha Zehlendorf		

International career
1958	West Germany	1	(0)
- * Club domestic league appearances and goals

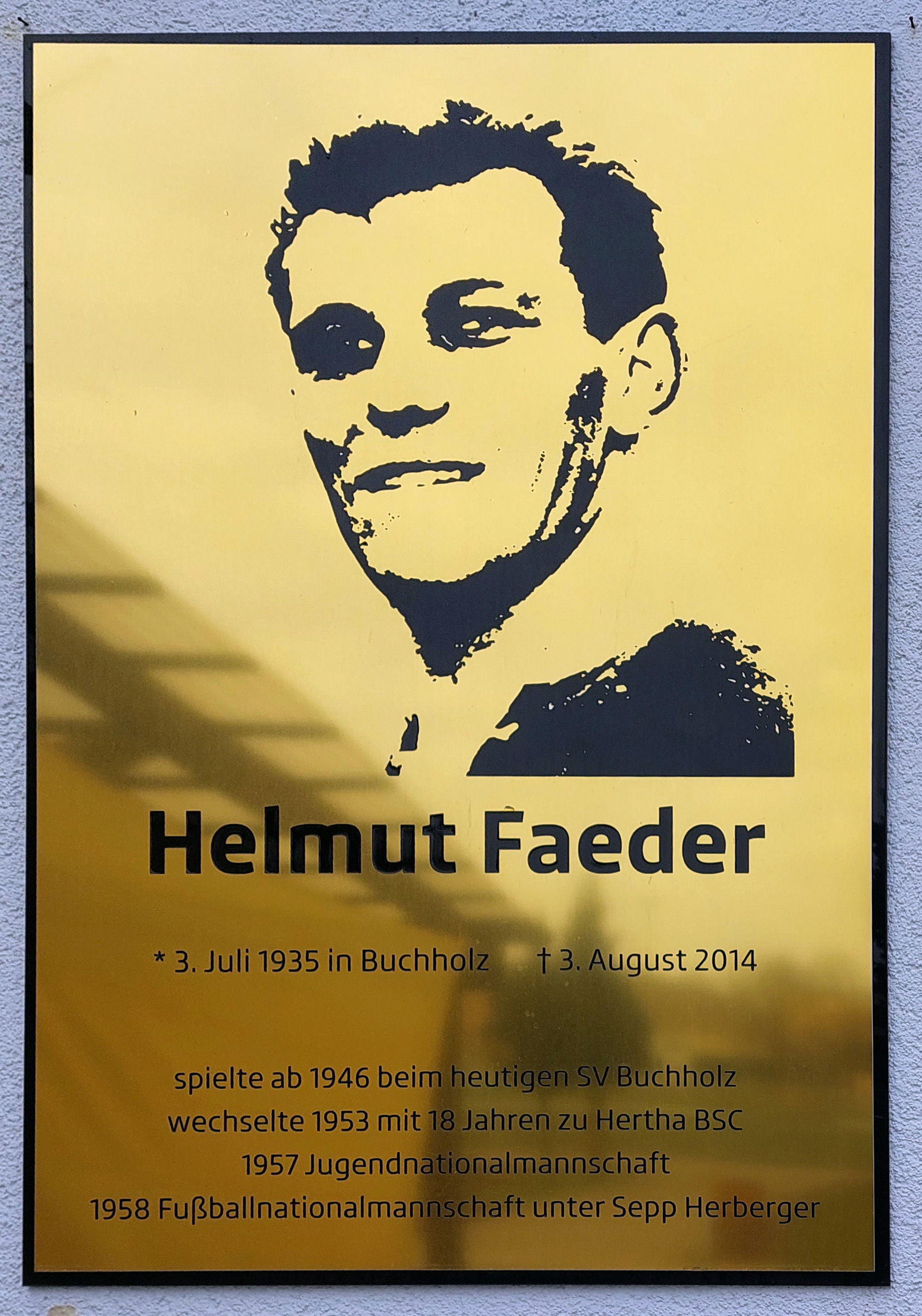
Faedar’s Memorial Plaque

Helmut Faeder (3 July 1935 - 3 August 2014) was a former German international footballer who played as a midfielder for Hertha BSC and Hertha Zehlendorf.
