= Lothar Schämer =

German footballer

Personal information
- Full name: Lothar Schämer
- Date of birth: 28 April 1940
- Place of birth: Ottowitz, Protectorate of Bohemia and Moravia
- Date of death: 27 December 2017 (aged 77)
- Place of death: Erzhausen, Germany
- Height: 1.78 m (5 ft 10 in)
- Position: Defender

Youth career
- –1960: SV Erzhausen

Senior career*
Years	Team	Apps	(Gls)
1960–1973	Eintracht Frankfurt	292	(67)
1973	SV Erzhausen		
1985	FC Rhein-Main		
- * Club domestic league appearances and goals

Lothar Schämer (28 April 1940 – 27 December 2017) was a German professional footballer who played as a defender.

Schämer played his entire professional career at Eintracht Frankfurt. In the 1963–64 season, he was part of the Frankfurt squad that debuted in the new founded Bundesliga scoring the first goal with a penalty against 1. FC Kaiserslautern. Finally, Schämer appeared in 216 Bundesliga fixtures netting 24 goals. His last match for Eintracht was on the 34th of the 1972–73 season against MSV Duisburg.

== Honours ==
- Oberliga Süd: runners-up 1960–61, 1961–62
- DFB-Pokal: runners-up 1963–64
- UEFA Intertoto Cup: 1966–67
