= Wolfgang Tillich =

German footballer (1939–1988)

Personal information
- Date of birth: 25 November 1939
- Date of death: 23 November 1988 (aged 48)
- Position: Goalkeeper

Senior career*
Years	Team	Apps	(Gls)
1957–1959	Blau-Weiß 90 Berlin		
1959–1967	Hertha BSC	39	(0)
1967–1969	Blau-Weiß 90 Berlin		
- * Club domestic league appearances and goals

Wolfgang Tillich (25 November 1939 – 23 November 1988) was a German footballer. He was the starting goalkeeper for the West Berlin-based club Hertha BSC in the inaugural season of the Bundesliga.
