= Jürgen Friedrich =

German footballer (born 1943)

Personal information
- Date of birth: 11 November 1943 (age 82)
- Place of birth: Dresden, Germany
- Height: 1.75 m (5 ft 9 in)
- Position: Midfielder

Senior career*
Years	Team	Apps	(Gls)
1963–1968	Eintracht Frankfurt	78	(12)
1968–1974	1. FC Kaiserslautern	158	(26)
- * Club domestic league appearances and goals

Jürgen "Atze" Friedrich (born 11 November 1943 in Dresden) is a retired German football player who played as a midfielder. He spent 11 seasons in the Bundesliga with Eintracht Frankfurt and 1. FC Kaiserslautern.

He spent three stints as the president of 1. FC Kaiserslautern from 1970s to 1990s.

== Honours ==
- DFB-Pokal finalist: 1963–64, 1971–72
