= Horst Trimhold =

German footballer (1941–2021)

Personal information
- Date of birth: 4 February 1941
- Place of birth: Essen, Nazi Germany
- Date of death: 8 April 2021 (aged 80)
- Place of death: Hanau, Germany
- Height: 1.75 m (5 ft 9 in)
- Position: Midfielder

Senior career*
Years	Team	Apps	(Gls)
1959–1963	Schwarz-Weiss Essen	71	(31)
1963–1966	Eintracht Frankfurt	71	(15)
1966–1971	Borussia Dortmund	96	(12)
1971–1978	FSV Frankfurt	103	(6)
Total		341	(64)

International career
1962	West Germany	1	(0)
- * Club domestic league appearances and goals

Horst Trimhold (4 February 1941 – 8 April 2021) was a German footballer who played as a midfielder.

== Club career ==
He spent eight seasons in the Bundesliga with Eintracht Frankfurt and Borussia Dortmund.

== International career ==
Trimhold represented the West Germany national team once, in a friendly against Yugoslavia in 1962.

== Honours ==
- DFB-Pokal: 1958–59; runner-up 1963–64
