= Uwe Klimaschefski =

German footballer

Personal information
- Date of birth: 11 December 1938 (age 87)
- Place of birth: Bremerhaven, Germany
- Position: Forward

Senior career*
Years	Team	Apps	(Gls)
1957–1960	TuS Bremerhaven 93		
1960–1963	Bayer Leverkusen		
1963–1965	Hertha BSC		
1965–1969	1. FC Kaiserslautern		

Managerial career
- 1970–1971: FC Homburg
- 1971–1972: Hapoel Haifa
- 1972–1974: FC Homburg
- 1974: Mainz 05
- 1974–1980: FC Homburg
- 1980–1981: Hertha BSC
- 1982–1986: 1. FC Saarbrücken
- 1986–1987: St. Gallen
- 1987: FC Homburg
- 1987–1988: 1860 Munich
- 1990: Darmstadt 98
- 1991: Blau-Weiß 90 Berlin
- 1992–1994: FC Homburg
- * Club domestic league appearances and goals

Uwe Klimaschefski (born 11 December 1938, Bremerhaven) is a German former football player and manager who played as a forward.
