= 2023–24 1. FC Nürnberg season =

1. FC Nürnberg
2023–24 season
- Board member: Dieter Hecking (sport); Niels Rossow (commercial)
- Head coach: Cristian Fiél
- Stadium: Max-Morlock-Stadion
- 2. Bundesliga: 12th
- DFB-Pokal: Round of 16
- Top goalscorer: League: Can Uzun (16); All: Can Uzun (19)
- Average home league attendance: 34,416
Home colours	Away colours

The 2023–24 season was 1. FC Nürnberg's 124th season in existence and fifth consecutive in the 2. Bundesliga. They also competed in the DFB-Pokal.

== Players ==
=== First-team squad ===
As of 31 August 2023

Note: Flags indicate national team as defined under FIFA eligibility rules; some limited exceptions apply. Players may hold more than one non-FIFA nationality.

No.	Pos.	Nation	Player
1	GK	GER	Carl Klaus
3	DF	GER	Ahmet Gürleyen
4	DF	WAL	James Lawrence
5	MF	GER	Johannes Geis
6	MF	GER	Florian Flick
7	FW	GER	Felix Lohkemper
8	MF	GER	Taylan Duman
9	FW	JPN	Daichi Hayashi (on loan from Sint-Truiden)
10	MF	NOR	Mats Møller Dæhli
11	MF	JPN	Kanji Okunuki
13	DF	GER	Erik Wekesser
14	FW	GER	Benjamin Goller
15	DF	ESP	Iván Márquez
16	DF	GER	Christopher Schindler
17	MF	GER	Jens Castrop
19	DF	GER	Florian Hübner

No.	Pos.	Nation	Player
22	DF	GER	Enrico Valentini (captain)
23	FW	ENG	Joseph Hungbo
26	GK	GER	Christian Mathenia
27	DF	GER	Nathaniel Brown
28	DF	GER	Jan Gyamerah
29	DF	GER	Tim Handwerker
31	GK	GER	Jan Reichert
33	FW	GER	Christoph Daferner
36	FW	GER	Lukas Schleimer
38	DF	GER	Jannes Horn
39	GK	GER	Nicolas Ortegel
41	MF	MAR	Ali Loune
42	FW	TUR	Can Uzun
43	DF	GER	Jannik Hofmann
44	FW	GER	Julian Kania

=== Out on loan ===
Note: Flags indicate national team as defined under FIFA eligibility rules; some limited exceptions apply. Players may hold more than one non-FIFA nationality.

No.	Pos.	Nation	Player
—	DF	GER	Louis Breunig (at Jahn Regensburg until 30 June 2024)
—	FW	GER	Jermain Nischalke (at Borussia Dortmund II until 30 June 2024)

No.	Pos.	Nation	Player
—	FW	GER	Manuel Wintzheimer (at Arminia Bielefeld until 30 June 2024)

== Transfers ==
=== In ===
Pos.	Player	Transferred from	Fee	Date	Source
FW	(Japan) Daichi Hayashi	(Belgium) Sint-Truiden	Loan	1 July 2023	

=== Out ===
Pos.	Player	Transferred to	Fee	Date	Source
MF	(Germany) Fabian Nürnberger	(Germany) Darmstadt 98	Free	1 July 2023	
DF	(Germany) Louis Breunig	(Germany) Jahn Regensburg	Loan	1 July 2023	
FW	(Switzerland) Kwadwo Duah	(Bulgaria) Ludogorets Razgrad	€3,000,000	19 July 2023	

== Pre-season and friendlies ==
Win Draw Loss

28 June 2023 Friendly	1. FC Hersbruck	1–13	1. FC Nürnberg	Hersbruck
19:00 CEST (UTC+2)	Hirschmann 53'	Report	Fuchs 2'; Uzun 9'; Handwerker 15' (pen.); Duah 18', 19', 28'; Hayashi 33'; Daferner 50'; Duman 61', 70'; Wintzheimer 64'; Lohkemper 73'; Nischalke 88'	Attendance: 2,000

1 July 2023 Friendly	1. FC Nürnberg	1–0	FK Pardubice	Ammerthal
17:00 CEST (UTC+2)	Daferner 44'	Report		Stadium: Sportplatz Ammerthal; Attendance: 500

5 July 2023 Friendly	Hartberg	2–2	1. FC Nürnberg	Bad Wimsbach, Austria
18:00 CEST (UTC+2)	Entrup 22'; Solet 51'	Report	Duah 61'; Dæhli 64'	Stadium: HF-Stadion Bad Wimsbach; Attendance: 150

9 July 2023 Friendly	Diósgyőr	1–3	1. FC Nürnberg	Hausmening, Austria
17:00 CEST (UTC+2)

13 July 2023 Friendly	1. FC Nürnberg	1–1	Arsenal	Nuremberg
19:00 CEST (UTC+2)	Okunuki 61'	Report	Saka 7'	Stadium: Max-Morlock-Stadion; Attendance: 18,781

15 July 2023 Friendly	1. FC Saarbrücken	2–1	1. FC Nürnberg	Mulfingen
14:00 CEST (UTC+2)		Report		Stadium: Arena Mulfingen-Hollenbach; Attendance: 300

22 July 2023 Friendly	SpVgg Unterhaching	1–2	1. FC Nürnberg
15:30 CEST (UTC+2)
Note: Match was played in two 30-minute periods.

22 July 2023 Friendly	1. FC Nürnberg	3–0	1860 Munich
16:45 CEST (UTC+2)
Note: Match was played in two 30-minute periods.

7 September 2023 Friendly	1. FC Nürnberg	3–1	1. FC Heidenheim	Nuremberg
14:00 CEST (UTC+2)	Wekesser 45' (pen.); Kania 78'; Geis 82'		Kühlwetter 53'	Stadium: Sportpark Valznerweiher

16 November 2023 Friendly	VfB Stuttgart	2–0	1. FC Nürnberg	Stuttgart
14:00 CET (UTC+1)		Report

== Competitions ==
=== Overall record ===
Competition	First match	Last match	Starting round	Final position	Record							
Competition	First match	Last match	Starting round	Final position	Pld	W	D	L	GF	GA	GD	Win %
2. Bundesliga	28 July 2023	19 May 2024	Matchday 1	12th	34	11	7	16	43	64	−21	32.35
DFB-Pokal	12 August 2023	5 December 2023	First round	Round of 16	3	2	0	1	12	5	+7	66.67
Total					37	13	7	17	55	69	−14	35.14

Source: Soccerway

=== 2. Bundesliga ===
==== League table ====
Pos	Team	Pld	W	D	L	GF	GA	GD	Pts
10	Schalke 04	34	12	7	15	53	60	−7	43
11	SV Elversberg	34	12	7	15	49	63	−14	43
12	1. FC Nürnberg	34	11	7	16	43	64	−21	40
13	1. FC Kaiserslautern	34	11	6	17	59	64	−5	39
14	1. FC Magdeburg	34	9	11	14	46	54	−8	38

Source: DFB
Rules for classification: 1) Points; 2) Goal difference; 3) Goals scored; 4) Head-to-head results; 5) Head-to-head away goals scored; 6) Away goals scored; 7) Play-off.
(Rules 4–6 only apply after home and away matches have been played between the tied teams.)

==== Results summary ====
Overall								Home						Away					
Pld	W	D	L	GF	GA	GD	Pts	W	D	L	GF	GA	GD	W	D	L	GF	GA	GD
19	8	3	8	27	36	−9	27	4	2	3	13	14	−1	4	1	5	14	22	−8

Last updated: 26 January 2024.

==== Results by round ====
Round	1	2	3	4	5	6	7	8	9	10	11	12	13	14	15	16	17	18	19	20	21	22	23
Ground	A	H	A	H	A	H	A	H	A	H	A	H	A	A	H	A	H	H	A	H	A	H	A
Result	L	D	W	W	L	D	D	W	L	W	W	L	W	L	L	W	L	W	L				
Position	17	14	11	8	11	11	10	8	13	9	8	11	8	9	11	10	10	7	9				

Updated to match(es) played on 26 January 2024. Source:
A = Away; H = Home; W = Win; D = Draw; L = Loss

==== Matches ====
The league fixtures were unveiled on 30 June 2023.

30 July 2023 1	Hansa Rostock	2–0	1. FC Nürnberg	Rostock
13:30 UTC+2	Strauß 42'; Fröling 47'	Report		Stadium: Ostseestadion; Attendance: 29,000 (sell-out); Referee: Florian Heft; Man of the Match: Damian Roßbach

6 August 2023 2	1. FC Nürnberg	2–2	Hannover 96	Nuremberg
13:30 UTC+2	Uzun 66', 90+2' (pen.)	Report	Teuchert 8' (pen.), 23' (pen.)	Stadium: Max-Morlock-Stadion; Attendance: 30,012; Referee: Patrick Alt; Man of the Match: Can Uzun

20 August 2023 3	VfL Osnabrück	2–3	1. FC Nürnberg	Osnabrück
13:30 UTC+2	Conteh 86', 88'	Report	Uzun 35'; Schleimer 70'; Goller 84'	Stadium: Stadion an der Bremer Brücke; Attendance: 15,741 (sell-out); Referee: Sascha Stegemann; Man of the Match: Daichi Hayashi

27 August 2023 4	1. FC Nürnberg	2–1	SV Wehen Wiesbaden	Nuremberg
13:30 UTC+2	Gyamerah 68'; Handwerker 76' (pen.)	Report	Prtajin 55'	Stadium: Max-Morlock-Stadion; Attendance: 26,547; Referee: Martin Petersen; Man of the Match: Jan Gyamerah

2 September 2023 5	1. FC Kaiserslautern	3–1	1. FC Nürnberg	Kaiserslautern
20:30 UTC+2	Tachie 19'; Puchacz 26'; Ache 30'	Report	Schleimer 37'	Stadium: Fritz-Walter-Stadion; Attendance: 43,677; Referee: Arne Aarnink; Man of the Match: Tymoteusz Puchacz

15 September 2023 6	1. FC Nürnberg	1–1	SpVgg Greuther Fürth	Nuremberg
18:30 UTC+2	Uzun 45+1' (pen.)	Report	Michalski 8'	Stadium: Max-Morlock-Stadion; Attendance: 47,000 (sell-out); Referee: Robert Hartmann; Man of the Match: Uzun

23 September 2023 7	Eintracht Braunschweig	2–2	1. FC Nürnberg	Braunschweig
13:00 UTC+2	Ujah 29', 65'	Report	Okunuki 38'; Goller 40'	Stadium: Eintracht-Stadion; Attendance: 19,798; Referee: Florian Heft; Man of the Match: Anthony Ujah

1 October 2023 8	1. FC Nürnberg	1–0	1. FC Magdeburg	Nuremberg
13:30 UTC+2	Lohkemper 46'	Report		Stadium: Max-Morlock-Stadion; Attendance: 33,106; Referee: Robin Braun; Man of the Match: Jens Castrop

7 October 2023 9	FC St. Pauli	5–1	1. FC Nürnberg	Hamburg
13:00 UTC+2	Saad 4'; Eggestein 49', 56'; Amenyido 90+3'; Metcalfe 90+5'	Report	Okunuki 24'	Stadium: Millerntor-Stadion; Attendance: 29,546; Referee: Matthias Jöllenbeck; Man of the Match: Johannes Eggestein

22 October 2023 10	1. FC Nürnberg	3–1	Hertha BSC	Nuremberg
13:30 UTC+2	Castrop 57'; Leistner 72' (o.g.); Hayashi 84'	Report	Prevljak 15'	Stadium: Max-Morlock-Stadion; Attendance: 37,320; Referee: Florian Exner; Man of the Match: Jens Castrop

29 October 2023 11	Holstein Kiel	0–2	1. FC Nürnberg	Kiel
13:30 UTC+1		Report	Handwerker 68'; Uzun 77'	Stadium: Holstein-Stadion; Attendance: 12,801; Referee: Frank Willenborg; Man of the Match: Can Uzun

4 November 2023 12	1. FC Nürnberg	1–2	Schalke 04	Nuremberg
13:00 UTC+1	Flick 47'	Report	Drexler 36'; Latza 89'	Stadium: Max-Morlock-Stadion; Attendance: 50,000; Referee: Wolfgang Haslberger

11 November 2023 13	SC Paderborn 07	1–3	1. FC Nürnberg	Paderborn
13:00 UTC+1	Grimaldi 78'	Report	Castrop 8'; Okunuki 39'; Schleimer 44'	Stadium: Home Deluxe Arena; Attendance: 12,249; Referee: Nicolas Winter

26 November 2023 14	Karlsruher SC	4–1	1. FC Nürnberg	Karlsruhe
13:30 CET	Nebel 1' (yellow card) 60'; Schleusener 70'; Beifus (yellow card) 82'; Zivzivadze 89' 90+4'	Report	Iván Márquez (yellow card) 26'; Uzun 61'; Flick (yellow card) 64'; Horn (yellow card) 80'	Stadium: BBBank Wildpark; Attendance: 25,966; Referee: (Germany) Harm Osmers

2 December 2023 15	1. FC Nürnberg	0–5	Fortuna Düsseldorf	Nuremberg
13:00 CET	Horn (yellow card) 55'; Brown (yellow card) 69'	Report	Kastenmeier (yellow card) 7'; Gavory (yellow card) 34'; Vermeij 38' 45+1' 56' (pen.) (yellow card) 57'; Tanaka 40'; Niemiec 84'	Stadium: Max-Morlock-Stadion; Attendance: 33,062; Referee: (Germany) Richard Hempel

10 December 2023 16	Elversberg	0–1	1. FC Nürnberg	Spiesen-Elversberg
13:30 CET	Sickinger (yellow card) 26'; Vandermersch (yellow card) 75'; Fellhauer (yellow card) 81'	Report	Hayashi (yellow card) 19' (goal) 83'; Gyamerah (yellow card) 78'; Iván Márquez (yellow card) 90+4'; Klaus (yellow card) 90+6'	Stadium: Waldstadion an der Kaiserlinde; Attendance: 8,150; Referee: (Germany) Robert Hartmann (referee)

16 December 2023 17	1. FC Nürnberg	0–2	Hamburger SV	Nuremberg
13:00 CET	Brown (yellow card) 45+2'	Report	Meffert (yellow card) 42'; Jatta (yellow card) 44'; Mikelbrencis (yellow card) 64'; Glatzel 80'; Bénes (yellow card) 90+6'; Dompé 90+7' (yellow card) 90+8'	Stadium: Max-Morlock-Stadion; Attendance: 41,276; Referee: (Germany) Tobias Reichel

20 January 2024 18	1. FC Nürnberg	3–0	Hansa Rostock	Nuremberg
13:00 CET	Uzun 15' 36'; Castrop 51'	Report		Stadium: Max-Morlock-Stadion; Attendance: 27,763; Referee: (Germany) Tom Bauer

26 January 2024 19	Hannover 96	3–0	1. FC Nürnberg	Hanover
18:30 CET	Nielsen 6' 38' (yellow card) 81'; Voglsammer (yellow card) 85'; Teuchert 90+2'	Report	Uzun (yellow card) 74'	Stadium: Heinz-von-Heiden-Arena; Attendance: 25,100; Referee: (Germany) Patrick Schwengers

3 February 2024 20	1. FC Nürnberg	–	Osnabrück	Nuremberg
13:00 CET				Stadium: Max-Morlock-Stadion

=== DFB-Pokal ===
12 August 2023 First round	FC Oberneuland	1–9	1. FC Nürnberg	Bremen
15:30 UTC+2	Lambers 89'	Report	Uzun 10', 14', 67'; Hayashi 15'; Gürleyen 19'; Duman 25', 29' (pen.); Goller 71'; Daferner 90'	Stadium: Marko Mock Arena; Referee: Lukas Benen

1 November 2023 Second round	1. FC Nürnberg	3–2 (a.e.t.)	Hansa Rostock	Nuremberg
20:45 UTC+1	Okunuki 63'; Lohkemper 90+5', 99'	Report	Brumado 58'; Kinsombi 74'	Stadium: Max-Morlock-Stadion; Referee: Arne Aarnink

5 December 2023 Round of 16	1. FC Kaiserslautern	2–0	1. FC Nürnberg	Kaiserslautern
18:00 UTC+1	Soldo (yellow card) 18'; Zimmer (yellow card) 31'; Tachie 75'; Ache 78'; Tomiak (yellow card) 90'	Report	Duman (yellow card) 11'; Wekesser (yellow card) 80'	Stadium: Fritz-Walter-Stadion; Attendance: 48,349; Referee: (Germany) Patrick Ittrich
