= 2022–23 1. FC Nürnberg season =

1. FC Nürnberg
2022–23 season
- Head coach: Robert Klauß / Markus Weinzierl / Dieter Hecking
- Stadium: Max-Morlock-Stadion
- 2. Bundesliga: 14th
- DFB-Pokal: Quarter-finals
- Top goalscorer: League: Kwadwo Duah (11); All: Kwadwo Duah (11)
Home colours	Away colours	Third colours

The 2022–23 season was the 123rd season in the history of 1. FC Nürnberg and their fourth consecutive season in the second division. The club participated in the 2. Bundesliga and DFB-Pokal.

== Players ==
=== First-team squad ===
As of 21 January 2023

Note: Flags indicate national team as defined under FIFA eligibility rules; some limited exceptions apply. Players may hold more than one non-FIFA nationality.

No.	Pos.	Nation	Player
1	GK	GER	Carl Klaus
3	DF	GER	Sadik Fofana (on loan from Bayer 04 Leverkusen)
4	DF	WAL	James Lawrence
5	MF	GER	Johannes Geis
6	MF	GER	Lino Tempelmann (on loan from SC Freiburg)
7	FW	GER	Felix Lohkemper
8	MF	GER	Taylan Duman
9	MF	GER	Danny Blum
10	MF	NOR	Mats Møller Dæhli
11	FW	GER	Erik Shuranov
13	DF	GER	Erik Wekesser
14	FW	GER	Benjamin Goller
15	DF	GER	Fabian Nürnberger
16	DF	GER	Christopher Schindler (captain)
17	MF	GER	Jens Castrop (on loan from Köln II)
19	DF	GER	Florian Hübner

No.	Pos.	Nation	Player
20	FW	GER	Pascal Köpke
21	MF	GER	Florian Flick (on loan from FC Schalke)
22	DF	GER	Enrico Valentini
23	FW	SUI	Kwadwo Duah
24	MF	COL	Gustavo Puerta (on loan from Bayer 04 Leverkusen)
25	MF	GER	Shawn Blum
26	GK	GER	Christian Mathenia
27	FW	GER	Jermain Nischalke
28	DF	GER	Jan Gyamerah
29	DF	GER	Tim Handwerker
30	GK	DEN	Peter Vindahl Jensen (on loan from AZ Alkmaar)
31	GK	GER	Jan Reichert
33	FW	GER	Christoph Daferner
35	DF	GER	Nathaniel Brown
36	FW	GER	Lukas Schleimer
38	DF	GER	Jannes Horn (on loan from VfL Bochum)

=== Out on loan ===
Note: Flags indicate national team as defined under FIFA eligibility rules; some limited exceptions apply. Players may hold more than one non-FIFA nationality.

No.	Pos.	Nation	Player
—	DF	GER	Paul-Philipp Besong (at FC Erzgebirge Aue until 30 June 2023)
—	FW	GER	Manuel Wintzheimer (at Eintracht Braunschweig until 30 June 2023)

== Pre-season and friendlies ==
Win Draw Loss Fixtures

18 June 2022 Friendly	Viktoria Aschaffenburg	0–2	1. FC Nürnberg	Aschaffenburg
14:00 CEST (UTC+2)				Stadium: Stadion am Schönbusch

26 June 2022 Friendly	Ludogorets Razgrad	3–0	1. FC Nürnberg	St. Johann in Tirol, Austria
16:30 CEST (UTC+2)				Stadium: Koasastadion Sankt Johann

3 July 2022 Friendly	WSG Tirol	2–0	1. FC Nürnberg	Rum, Austria
15:00 CEST (UTC+2)				Stadium: Sportzentrum Rum

8 July 2022 Friendly	1. FC Nürnberg	3–5	Arsenal	Nuremberg
17:30 CEST (UTC+2)	Geis 24'; Duah 29'; Schleimer 73'		Gabriel Jesus 47', 75'; Elneny 54', (yellow card) 59'; Schindler 58' (o.g.); Handwerker 63' (o.g.); Marí (yellow card) 85'	Stadium: Max-Morlock-Stadion; Attendance: 21,616; Referee: Michael Bacher

9 July 2022 Friendly	1. FC Nürnberg	2–1	1. FC Schweinfurt	Nuremberg
14:00 CEST (UTC+2)				Stadium: Max-Morlock-Platz im Sportpark Valznerweiher

22 September 2022 Friendly	1. FC Nürnberg	4–3	St. Gallen	Nuremberg
13:00 CEST (UTC+2)				Stadium: Max-Morlock-Platz im Sportpark Valznerweiher

14 January 2023 Friendly	Cracovia	0–0	1. FC Nürnberg	Belek, Turkey
15:00 UST (UTC+4)				Stadium: Titanic Sports Center - Field 2

== Competitions ==
=== Overall record ===
Competition	First match	Last match	Starting round	Record							
Competition	First match	Last match	Starting round	Pld	W	D	L	GF	GA	GD	Win %
2. Bundesliga	16 July 2022	28 May 2023	Matchday 1	31	9	7	15	29	47	−18	29.03
DFB-Pokal	31 July 2022		First round	4	2	1	1	4	2	+2	50.00
Total				35	11	8	16	33	49	−16	31.43

Last updated: 13 November 2022
Source: Soccerway

=== 2. Bundesliga ===
==== League table ====
Pos	Team	Pld	W	D	L	GF	GA	GD	Pts	Promotion, qualification or relegation
12	Greuther Fürth	34	10	11	13	47	50	−3	41	
13	Hansa Rostock	34	12	5	17	32	48	−16	41	
14	1. FC Nürnberg	34	10	9	15	32	49	−17	39	
15	Eintracht Braunschweig	34	9	9	16	42	59	−17	36	
16	Arminia Bielefeld (R)	34	9	7	18	50	62	−12	34	Qualification for relegation play-offs

Source: DFB
Rules for classification: 1) Points; 2) Goal difference; 3) Goals scored; 4) Head-to-head results; 5) Head-to-head away goals scored; 6) Away goals scored; 7) Play-off.
(R) Relegated

==== Results summary ====
Overall								Home						Away					
Pld	W	D	L	GF	GA	GD	Pts	W	D	L	GF	GA	GD	W	D	L	GF	GA	GD
31	9	7	15	29	47	−18	34	7	3	6	18	17	+1	2	4	9	11	30	−19

Last updated: 11 February 2023.
Source: DFB

==== Results by round ====
Round	1	2	3	4	5	6	7	8	9	10	11	12	13	14	15	16	17	18	19	20	21	22	23	24	25	26	27	28	29	30	31
Ground	A	H	A	H	A	H	A	H	A	A	H	A	H	A	H	A	H	H	A	H	A	H	A	H	A	H	H	A	H	A	H
Result	L	W	D	L	W	L	L	W	L	L	L	W	D	D	L	D	W	L	L	W	L	W	L	W	D	L	D	L	W	L	D
Position	11	7	11	13	12	12	14	11	13	14	16	14	13	14	17	17	11	12	16	13	13	12	13	12	12	13	13	14	13	13	14

Updated to match(es) played on 11 February 2023. Source: DFB
A = Away; H = Home; W = Win; D = Draw; L = Loss

==== Matches ====
The league fixtures were announced on 17 June 2022.

16 July 2022 1	FC St. Pauli	3–2	1. FC Nürnberg	Hamburg
13:30 CEST (UTC+2)	Irvine 24'; Paqarada 37' (pen.); Daschner 39'	Report	Duah 46'; Valentini 90+3'	Stadium: Millerntor-Stadion; Attendance: 28,582; Referee: Florian Heft; Man of the Match: Paqarada

23 July 2022 2	1. FC Nürnberg	2–0	Greuther Fürth	Nuremberg
13:00 CEST (UTC+2)	Daferner 15'; Wintzheimer 81'	Report		Stadium: Max-Morlock-Stadion; Attendance: 41,204; Referee: Sascha Stegemann; Man of the Match: Duah

6 August 2022 3	Jahn Regensburg	0–0	1. FC Nürnberg	Regensburg
13:00 CEST (UTC+2)		Report		Stadium: Jahnstadion Regensburg; Attendance: 15,210; Referee: Daniel Schlager; Man of the Match: Albers

12 August 2022 4	1. FC Nürnberg	0–3	1. FC Heidenheim	Nuremberg
18:30 CEST (UTC+2)		Report	Thomalla 44'; Beck 49'; Beste 80'	Stadium: Max-Morlock-Stadion; Attendance: 27,155; Referee: Florian Lechner; Man of the Match: Beck

20 August 2022 5	SV Sandhausen	1–2	1. FC Nürnberg	Sandhausen
13:00 CEST (UTC+2)	Ajdini 33'	Report	Daferner 49'; Duah 90+3'	Stadium: BWT-Stadion am Hardtwald; Attendance: 5,701; Referee: Max Burda; Man of the Match: Daferner

27 August 2022 6	1. FC Nürnberg	0–2	Hamburger SV	Nuremberg
20:30 CEST (UTC+2)		Report	Vušković 37'; Glatzel 90+2'	Stadium: Max-Morlock-Stadion; Attendance: 35,713; Referee: Felix Zwayer; Man of the Match: Meffert

2 September 2022 7	Eintracht Braunschweig	4–2	1. FC Nürnberg	Braunschweig
18:30 CEST (UTC+2)	Kaufmann 13', 61'; Ujah 44'; Pherai 59'	Report	Castrop 10'; Duah 29'	Stadium: Eintracht-Stadion; Attendance: 17,173; Referee: Patrick Alt; Man of the Match: Kaufmann

9 September 2022 8	1. FC Nürnberg	1–0	Arminia Bielefeld	Nuremberg
18:30 CEST (UTC+2)	Tempelmann 90'	Report		Stadium: Max-Morlock-Stadion; Attendance: 26,641; Referee: Alexander Sather; Man of the Match: Tempelmann

17 September 2022 9	SV Darmstadt 98	2–0	1. FC Nürnberg	Darmstadt
13:30 CEST (UTC+2)	Kempe 8'; Tietz 27'	Report		Stadium: Stadion am Böllenfalltor; Attendance: 14,500 (sell-out); Referee: Christian Dingert; Man of the Match: Kempe

2 October 2022 10	Karlsruher SC	3–0	1. FC Nürnberg	Karlsruhe
13:30 CEST (UTC+2)	Schleusener 45'; Heise 78'; Wanitzek 82'	Report		Stadium: Wildparkstadion; Attendance: 19,268; Referee: Robert Kampka; Man of the Match: Schleusener

9 October 2022 11	1. FC Nürnberg	2–3	Holstein Kiel	Nuremberg
13:30 CEST (UTC+2)	Tempelmann 39'; Daferner 90+4'	Report	Skrzybski 62', 80'; Reese 65'	Stadium: Max-Morlock-Stadion; Attendance: 28,518; Referee: Timo Gerach; Man of the Match: Skrzybski

15 October 2022 12	Fortuna Düsseldorf	0–1	1. FC Nürnberg	Düsseldorf
13:00 CEST (UTC+2)		Report	Duah 47'	Stadium: Merkur Spiel-Arena; Attendance: 25,750; Referee: Wolfgang Haslberger; Man of the Match: Schindler

22 October 2022 13	1. FC Nürnberg	0–0	Hannover 96	Nuremberg
13:00 CEST (UTC+2)		Report		Stadium: Max-Morlock-Stadion; Attendance: 28,422; Referee: Felix Zwayer; Man of the Match: Schindler

29 October 2022 14	1. FC Kaiserslautern	0–0	1. FC Nürnberg	Kaiserslautern
13:00 CEST (UTC+2)		Report		Stadium: Fritz-Walter-Stadion; Attendance: 46,895 (sell-out); Referee: Michael Bacher; Man of the Match: Mathenia

6 November 2022 15	1. FC Nürnberg	1–2	1. FC Magdeburg	Nuremberg
13:30 CET (UTC+1)	Reimann 65' (ogg.)	Report	Piccini 58', 76' (pen.)	Stadium: Max-Morlock-Stadion; Attendance: 30,377; Referee: Nicolas Winter; Man of the Match: Piccini

9 November 2022 16	FC Hansa Rostock	1–1	1. FC Nürnberg	Rostock
18:30 CET (UTC+1)	Fröling 90+1'	Report	Nürnberger 5'	Stadium: Ostseestadion; Attendance: 23,500; Referee: Robin Braun; Man of the Match: Schindler

13 November 2022 17	1. FC Nürnberg	2–1	SC Paderborn 07	Nuremberg
13:30 CET (UTC+1)	Duah 36', 55'	Report	Justvan 64'	Stadium: Max-Morlock-Stadion; Attendance: 25,527; Referee: Robert Kampka; Man of the Match: Duah

29 January 2023 18	1. FC Nürnberg	0–1	FC St. Pauli	Nuremberg
13:30 CET (UTC+1)		Report	Medić 33'	Stadium: Max-Morlock-Stadion; Attendance: 30,871; Referee: Alexander Sather; Man of the Match: Medić

4 February 2023 19	SpVgg Greuther Fürth	1–0	1. FC Nürnberg	Fürth
20:30 CET (UTC+1)	Ache 90+1'	Report		Stadium: Sportpark Ronhof; Attendance: 16,626 (sell-out); Referee: Tobias Stieler; Man of the Match: Griesbeck

11 February 2023 20	1. FC Nürnberg	1–0	SSV Jahn Regensburg	Nuremberg
13:00 CET (UTC+1)	Valentini 56'	Report		Stadium: Max-Morlock-Stadion; Attendance: 27,118; Referee: Arne Aarnink; Man of the Match: Schindler

19 February 2023 21	1. FC Heidenheim	5–0	1. FC Nürnberg	Heidenheim
13:30 CET (UTC+1)	Kleindienst 19', 23', 39', 81'; Busch 86'	Report		Stadium: Voith-Arena; Attendance: 10,955; Referee: Florian Exner; Man of the Match: Kleindienst

25 February 2023 22	1. FC Nürnberg	1–0	SV Sandhausen	Nuremberg
13:00 CET (UTC+1)	Duah 86' (pen.)	Report		Stadium: Max-Morlock-Stadion; Attendance: 26,260; Referee: Robin Braun; Man of the Match: Duah

4 March 2023 23	Hamburger SV	3–0	1. FC Nürnberg	Hamburg
13:00 CET (UTC+1)	Dompé 19'; Reis 52'; Königsdörffer 90+5'	Report		Stadium: Volksparkstadion; Attendance: 57,000; Referee: Tobias Reichel; Man of the Match: Dompé

10 March 2023 24	1. FC Nürnberg	2–0	Eintracht Braunschweig	Nuremberg
18:30 CET (UTC+1)	Hübner 69'; Gyamerah 81'	Report		Stadium: Max-Morlock-Stadion; Attendance: 25,238; Referee: Timo Gerach; Man of the Match: Tempelmann

17 March 2023 25	Arminia Bielefeld	2–2	1. FC Nürnberg	Bielefeld
18:30 CET (UTC+1)	Okugawa 6'; Klos 23'	Report	Duah 57'; Shuranov 90+8' (pen.)	Stadium: Schüco-Arena; Attendance: 23,473; Referee: Martin Petersen; Man of the Match: Okugawa

31 March 2023 26	1. FC Nürnberg	0–1	SV Darmstadt 98	Nuremberg
18:30 CEST (UTC+2)		Report	Schindler 31' (ogg.)	Stadium: Max-Morlock-Stadion; Attendance: 26,545; Referee: Sven Waschitzki; Man of the Match: Zimmermann

8 April 2023 27	1. FC Nürnberg	1–1	Karlsruher SC	Nuremberg
13:00 CEST (UTC+2)	Duah 90+4' (pen.)	Report	Kaufmann 26'	Stadium: Max-Morlock-Stadion; Attendance: 29,422; Referee: Wolfgang Haslberger; Man of the Match: Duah

15 April 2023 28	Holstein Kiel	2–1	1. FC Nürnberg	Kiel
13:00 CEST (UTC+2)	Skrzybski 19'; Reese 39'	Report	Lohkemper 65'	Stadium: Holstein-Stadion; Attendance: 12,931; Referee: Robin Braun; Man of the Match: Reese

22 April 2023 29	1. FC Nürnberg	2–0	Fortuna Düsseldorf	Nuremberg
13:00 CEST (UTC+2)	Brown 10'; Duah 90+3'	Report		Stadium: Max-Morlock-Stadion; Attendance: 27,682; Referee: Sören Storks; Man of the Match: Brown

29 April 2023 30	Hannover 96	3–0	1. FC Nürnberg	Hannover
20:30 CEST (UTC+2)	Börner 43'; Köhn 49'; Beier 70'	Report		Stadium: Niedersachsenstadion; Attendance: 28,500; Referee: Richard Hempel; Man of the Match: Köhn

=== DFB-Pokal ===
29 July 2022 First round	1. FC Kaan-Marienborn	0–2	1. FC Nürnberg	Siegen (Note: The 1. FC Kaan-Marienborn v 1. FC Nürnberg match will take place at the Leimbachstadion instead of 1. FC Kaan-Marienborn's home stadium, the Herkules-Arena im Breitenbachtal.)
18:00 CEST (UTC+2)		Report	Geis 45'; Valentini 84'	Stadium: Leimbachstadion; Attendance: 8,000; Referee: Robert Kampka

18 October 2022 Second round	Waldhof Mannheim	0–1	1. FC Nürnberg	Mannheim
18:00 CEST (UTC+2)		Report	Gohlke 63' (ogg.)	Stadium: Carl-Benz-Stadion; Attendance: 17,757; Referee: Christian Dingert; Man of the Match: Geis
