= Can Uzun =

Footballer (born 2005)

Personal information
- Full name: Can Yılmaz Uzun
- Date of birth: 11 November 2005 (age 21)
- Place of birth: Regensburg, Germany
- Height: 1.86 m (6 ft 1 in)
- Position: Attacking midfielder

Team information
- Current team: Eintracht Frankfurt
- Number: 42

Youth career
- Jahn Regensburg
- –2019: FC Ingolstadt 04
- 2019–2023: 1. FC Nürnberg

Senior career*
Years	Team	Apps	(Gls)
2023	1. FC Nürnberg II	4	(1)
2023–2024	1. FC Nürnberg	33	(16)
2024–	Eintracht Frankfurt	48	(14)

International career^{‡}
2021–2022	Turkey U17	10	(7)
2022	Turkey U18	2	(0)
2024–	Turkey	12	(1)
- * Club domestic league appearances and goals as of 19:30, 1 November 2026 (UTC) ‡ National team caps and goals as of 15 November 2026

Can Yılmaz Uzun (born 11 November 2005) is a professional footballer who plays as an attacking midfielder for Bundesliga club Eintracht Frankfurt. Born in Germany, he plays for the Turkey national team.

== Club career ==
=== Early career ===
Uzun, who hails from the Upper Palatinate, began his club career in his hometown of Regensburg, in the youth department of SSV Jahn Regensburg, before moving to Upper Bavarian side, FC Ingolstadt.

=== 1. FC Nürnberg ===
In 2019, he joined Franconian club, 1. FC Nürnberg, where he started playing for the U17 team from the 2020–21 season in the Under 17 Bundesliga. In the season, which was cut short after five games, due to the COVID-19 pandemic, Uzun scored five goals. In the following season, he scored 22 goals in 19 matches, becoming the second-highest scorer in the South/Southwest division behind Unterhaching's Maurice Krattenmacher.

==== 2022–23 season ====
As a result, the forward signed his first professional contract with the club in February 2022. In the 2022–23 season, Uzun moved up to the U19 team and immediately became a regular starter. He scored 15 goals in 15 matches in the Under 19 Bundesliga, becoming the top scorer in the South/Southwest division.

After finishing his youth season, Uzun made his senior football debut. On 10 April 2023, he debuted for 1. FC Nürnberg's reserve team in the Regionalliga Bayern, during a 3–4 defeat to 1. FC Schweinfurt 05, and he scored the equalizing goal to make it 3-3, only two minutes after being subbed on for Tim Handwerker.

Uzun appeared in three more Regionalliga matches afterward. Due to his impressive performances, he was called up to 1. FC Nürnberg's senior squad by interim coach, Dieter Hecking, for the 32nd matchday. He made his 2. Bundesliga debut in a 2–2 draw against 1. FC Magdeburg, coming on as a late substitute. He had another brief substitute appearance, and, on the final matchday, in a 1–0 victory over SC Paderborn 07, he was included in the starting lineup.

==== 2023–24 season ====
For the 2023–24 2. Bundesliga, Uzun, along with two other A-Junior players, Nicolas Ortegel and Finn Jeltsch, was permanently promoted to the first team, now coached by Cristian Fiél. Prior to the season, strikers, Kwadwo Duah, Erik Shuranov, Paul-Philipp Besong, Pascal Köpke, and Jermain Nischalke had left the club. Uzun rescued his team in the first home game of the season, with two goals, securing a point against Hannover 96. At 17 years and 268 days old, Uzun became FCN's youngest professional goalscorer, surpassing Christian Wück (18 years and 62 days).

Just six days later, Uzun set another age record, this time, in the DFB-Pokal. He contributed three goals and two assists in a 9–1 victory over FC Oberneuland, becoming the youngest player to score a hat-trick in the competition, breaking Olaf Thon’s record. In mid-September 2023, Uzun scored from a penalty in his first Franconian derby, which ended in a 1–1 draw against SpVgg Greuther Fürth.

=== Eintracht Frankfurt ===
==== 2024–25 season ====
On 2 July 2024, Uzun signed a five-year contract, with Eintracht Frankfurt.

On 24 August 2024, he made his Bundesliga debut against Borussia Dortmund and, on 2 November 2024, he scored his first goal with the team against Bochum. He would go on to make 20 appearances and start six games in the Bundesliga, during his debut season in Hessen, as Frankfurt finished in 3rd place in the Bundesliga, their best domestic finish in over a decade, en route to qualifying for the Champions League for the 2025–26 season.

==== 2025–26 season ====
Uzun was in the starting lineup for Frankfurt's Eröffnungsspiel, against northern side, Werder Bremen, on August 23, playing in the #10 position, and had an excellent game, scoring Frankfurt's first goal and assisting on the first of two goals, scored by winger, Jean-Mattéo Bahoya as Frankfurt cruised to a 4–1 win to begin the season.

== International career ==
Uzun competed for the Turkish youth national teams. In 2021, he was called up to the Turkey U17 squad and played in a few matches. In 2022, he competed with his squad at the U17 European Championship, hosted in Israel. The Turkish team was eliminated after the group stage. However, Uzun managed to score his team's only two goals, during the competition. In November 2022, he played two matches with the Turkey U18, against the Uzbekistan U18 and captained the team.

The 17-year-old was called up for the first time to the Turkey national under-21 football team in September 2023, but, owing to a slight injury, he had to withdraw from two qualification matches for the U21 European Championship in 2025.

Uzun, whose parents are both from Turkey, chose to represent the Turkish Football Federation (TFF) over the DFB in early March 2024, despite the fact that he could have represented either as a dual citizen.

For two international matches later that month, Turkish national coach, Vincenzo Montella, called up three players for the first time, including Uzun. The striker was substituted in the last moments of Turkey's first match, which ended 0–1 against Hungary. He was later included in the tentative roster for the 2024 European Championship in Germany, but Uzun did not make the final squad.

On 2 June 2026, Uzun was selected in the 26-man squad for the 2026 FIFA World Cup.

== Career statistics ==
=== Club ===
As of match played 1 November 2026

Appearances and goals by club, season and competition
Club	Season	League			DFB-Pokal		Europe		Total	
Club	Season	Division	Apps	Goals	Apps	Goals	Apps	Goals	Apps	Goals
1. FC Nürnberg II	2022–23	Regionalliga Bayern	4	1	—		—		4	1
1. FC Nürnberg	2022–23	2. Bundesliga	3	0	0	0	—		7	1
1. FC Nürnberg	2023–24	2. Bundesliga	30	16	2	3	—		32	19
1. FC Nürnberg	Total		33	16	2	3	0	0	35	19
Eintracht Frankfurt	2024–25	Bundesliga	20	4	1	0	10 (Note: Appearances in UEFA Europa League)	1	31	5
Eintracht Frankfurt	2025–26	Bundesliga	21	8	2	0	5 (Note: Appearances in UEFA Champions League)	2	28	10
Eintracht Frankfurt	2026–27	Bundesliga	7	2	2	2	—		9	4
Eintracht Frankfurt	Total		48	14	5	2	15	3	68	19
Career total			85	31	7	5	15	3	107	39

=== International ===
As of match played 15 November 2026

Appearances and goals by national team and year
National team	Year	Apps	Goals
Turkey	2024	1	0
Turkey	2025	3	0
Turkey	2026	5	1
Total		10	1

Scores and results list Turkey's goal tally first, score column indicates score after each Uzun goal.

List of international goals scored by Can Uzun
No.	Date	Venue	Opponent	Score	Result	Competition
1	1 June 2026	Şükrü Saracoğlu Stadium, Istanbul, Turkey	North Macedonia	2–0	4–0	Friendly
