= Florian Flick =

German footballer (born 2000)

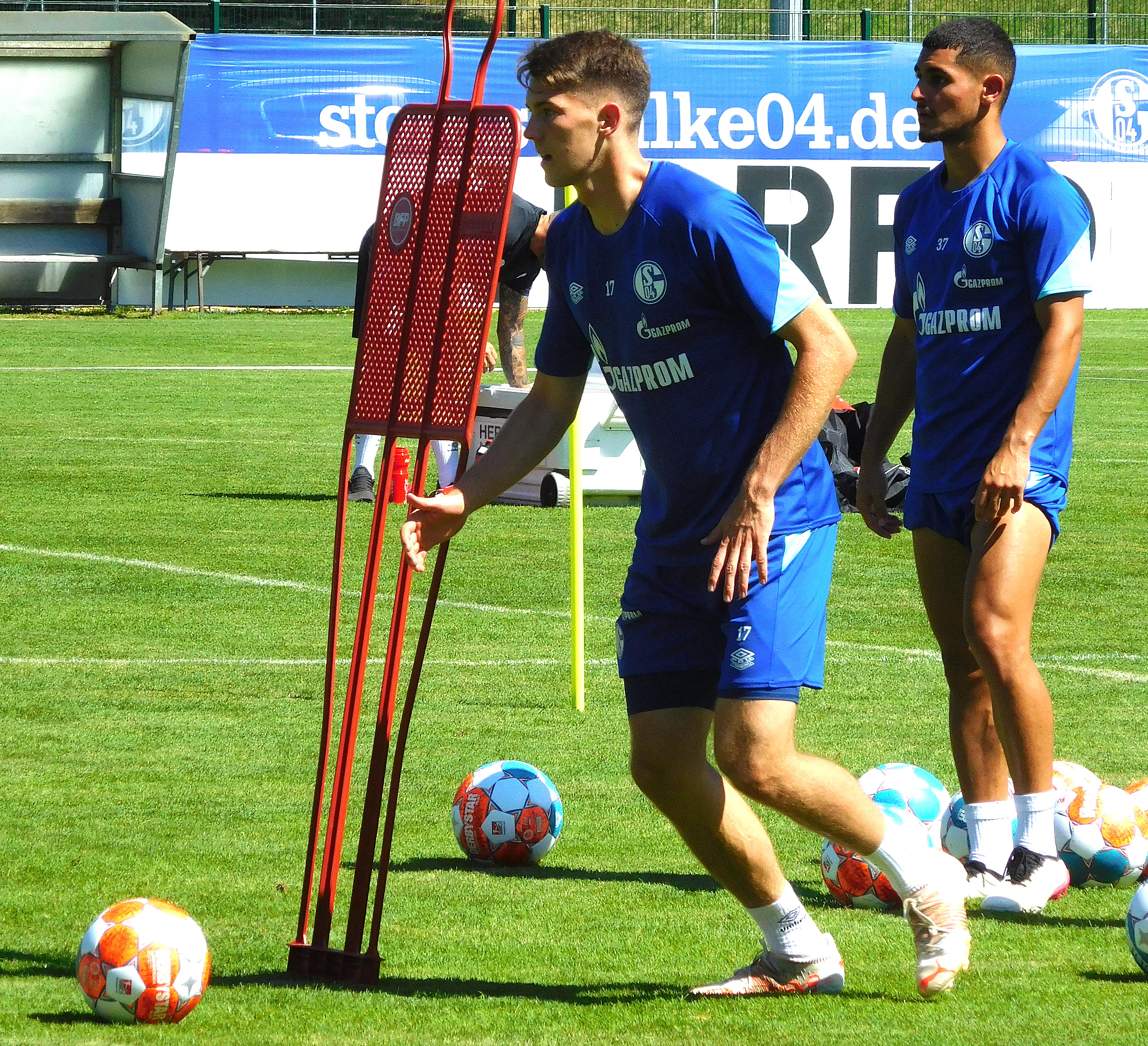
- Flick training with Schalke 04 in 2021

Personal information
- Date of birth: 1 May 2000 (age 26)
- Place of birth: Mannheim, Germany
- Height: 1.88 m (6 ft 2 in)
- Position: Defensive midfielder

Team information
- Current team: Eintracht Braunschweig
- Number: 6

Youth career
- 2005–2011: SV Gammelsbach
- 2011–2013: VfB Eberbach
- 2013–2014: JSF Hetzbach/Günterfürst
- 2014–2018: Waldhof Mannheim

Senior career*
Years	Team	Apps	(Gls)
2018–2020	Waldhof Mannheim	16	(1)
2020–2021	Schalke 04 II	34	(2)
2021–2023	Schalke 04	39	(1)
2023	→ 1. FC Nürnberg (loan)	16	(0)
2023–2026	1. FC Nürnberg	48	(3)
2025–2026	→ Eintracht Braunschweig (loan)	27	(1)
2026–	Eintracht Braunschweig	0	(0)

International career
2022	Germany U21	1	(0)
- * Club domestic league appearances and goals as of 18 May 2026

Florian Flick (born 1 May 2000) is a German professional footballer who plays as a defensive midfielder for 2. Bundesliga club Eintracht Braunschweig.

== Club career ==
Flick made his first team debut for Schalke 04 in a 4–2 away defeat against 1899 Hoffenheim on 8 May 2021, playing the complete 90 minutes. He scored his first goal for the senior team in a 4–3 win over Eintracht Frankfurt on 15 May 2021. He signed a professional contract with the club on 25 May 2021, lasting until 2023.

On 8 December 2022, he joined on loan 2. Bundesliga club 1. FC Nürnberg for the second half of the season. In August 2023, the move was made permanent.

On 1 September 2025, Flick moved to Eintracht Braunschweig on loan with a conditional obligation to buy. The conditions in the contract were fulfilled on 4 December 2025, making a permanent transfer to Eintracht Braunschweig in July 2026 and a contract with the club until mid-2028 active.

== International career ==
Flick debuted for the German U-21 national team in a 2–1 win against Poland on 7 June 2022, coming on as a substitute in the 68th minute.

== Career statistics ==
As of match played 18 May 2025

Appearances and goals by club, season and competition
Club	Season	League			DFB-Pokal		Other		Total	
Club	Season	Division	Apps	Goals	Apps	Goals	Apps	Goals	Apps	Goals
Waldhof Mannheim	2018–19	Regionalliga Südwest	3	0	—		—		3	0
Waldhof Mannheim	2019–20	3. Liga	13	1	—		—		13	1
Waldhof Mannheim	Total		16	1	—		—		16	1
Schalke 04 II	2020–21	Regionalliga West	33	2	—		—		33	2
Schalke 04 II	2021–22	Regionalliga West	1	0	—		—		1	0
Schalke 04 II	Total		34	2	—		—		34	2
Schalke 04	2020–21	Bundesliga	4	1	0	0	—		4	1
Schalke 04	2021–22	2. Bundesliga	27	0	1	0	—		28	0
Schalke 04	2022–23	Bundesliga	8	0	2	0	—		10	0
Schalke 04	Total		39	1	3	0	—		42	1
1. FC Nürnberg (loan)	2022–23	2. Bundesliga	16	0	1	0	—		17	0
1. FC Nürnberg	2023–24	2. Bundesliga	27	2	2	0	—		29	2
1. FC Nürnberg	2024–25	2. Bundesliga	21	1	1	0	—		22	1
1. FC Nürnberg	Total		64	3	4	0	—		68	3
Career total			153	7	7	0	0	0	160	7

== Honours ==
Schalke 04

- 2. Bundesliga: 2021–22
