= Hungbo =

Hungbo is a surname. Notable people with the surname include:

- Joseph Hungbo (born 2000), English footballer
