= 2024–25 1. FC Nürnberg season =

1. FC Nürnberg
2024–25 season
- Manager: Miroslav Klose
- Stadium: Max-Morlock-Stadion
- 2. Bundesliga: 10th
- DFB-Pokal: Second round
- Top goalscorer: League: Stefanos Tzimas (12); All: Stefanos Tzimas (12)
- Average home league attendance: 37,408
Home colours	Away colours	Third colours

The 2024–25 season was the 125th season in the history of 1. FC Nürnberg and the sixth consecutive season in the 2. Bundesliga. In addition to the domestic league, the club participated in the DFB-Pokal.

== Summary ==
On 11 June, former German national team striker Miroslav Klose was appointed on a two-year deal to succeed the departing Cristian Fiél.

== Transfers ==
=== In ===
Pos.	Player	Transferred from	Fee	Date	Source
MF	(Czech Republic) Michal Ševčík	(Czech Republic) Sparta Prague	Loan	1 July 2024	
MF	(Germany) Florian Pick	(Germany) 1. FC Heidenheim	Free	1 July 2024	
MF	(Germany) Rafael Lubach	(Germany) Borussia Dortmund U19		1 July 2024	
GK	(Slovakia) Michal Kukučka	(Slovakia) AS Trenčín		1 July 2024	
MF	(Germany) Caspar Jander	(Germany) MSV Duisburg	Free	1 July 2024	
DF	(Brazil) Danilo Soares	(Germany) VfL Bochum	Free	1 July 2024	
MF	(Greece) Stefanos Tzimas	(Greece) PAOK	Loan	1 July 2024	
DF	(Germany) Robin Knoche	(Germany) Union Berlin	Free	19 July 2024	
FW	(Germany) Janni Serra	(Denmark) AGF	Loan	26 July 2024	
FW	(England) Joseph Hungbo	(England) Rotherham United	Loan return	2 January 2025	

=== Out ===
Pos.	Player	Transferred to	Fee	Date	Source
FW	(Sweden) Sebastian Andersson		End of contract	1 July 2024	
FW	(Germany) Christoph Daferner	(Germany) Dynamo Dresden	Loan	1 July 2024	
MF	(Turkey) Can Uzun	(Germany) Eintracht Frankfurt	€11,000,000	2 July 2024	
MF	(England) Joseph Hungbo	(England) Rotherham United	Loan	10 July 2024	
DF	(Spain) Iván Márquez	(Netherlands) NEC Nijmegen	Loan	15 July 2024	
DF	(Germany) Jan Gyamerah	(Germany) 1. FC Kaiserslautern	Loan	26 July 2024	
DF	(Germany) Tim Handwerker	(Germany) Jahn Regensburg	Loan	3 January 2025	
FW	(England) Joseph Hungbo	(England) Wigan Athletic	Undisclosed	3 January 2025	

== Friendlies ==
=== Pre-season ===
4 July 2024 Friendly	SpVgg Ansbach	1–4	1. FC Nürnberg
18:30	27'		Pick 26'; Goller 55', 71'; Forkel 69'

13 July 2024 Friendly	1. FC Nürnberg	1–1	1860 Munich
15:30	(penalty missed) 35'; 51'		7'

20 July 2024 Friendly	1. FC Nürnberg	2–1	Blackburn Rovers	Kössen, Austria
17:00	Soares 2'; Schleimer 30'		Brittain 34'	Stadium: Kaiserwinkl Arena
Note: Two periods of 30 minutes

20 July 2024 Friendly	1. FC Nürnberg	2–1	Blackburn Rovers	Kössen, Austria
18:15	Forkel 13'; Tzimas 43'		Buckley 58'	Stadium: Kaiserwinkl Arena
Note: Two periods of 30 minutes

26 July 2024 Friendly	1. FC Nürnberg	3–0	Juventus	Nuremberg
17:00				Stadium: Max-Morlock-Stadion

=== Mid-season ===
12 January 2025 Friendly	1. FC Nürnberg	2–1	FC Ingolstadt
11:00

12 January 2025 Friendly	1. FC Nürnberg	3–0	FC Ingolstadt
13:45

== Competitions ==
=== Overall record ===
Competition	First match	Last match	Starting round	Record							
Competition	First match	Last match	Starting round	Pld	W	D	L	GF	GA	GD	Win %
2. Bundesliga	3 August 2024	18 May 2025	Matchday 1	6	2	1	3	8	12	−4	33.33
DFB-Pokal	18 August 2024		First round	1	0	1	0	1	1	+0	0.00
Total				7	2	2	3	9	13	−4	28.57

Last updated: 22 September 2024
Source: Competitions

=== 2. Bundesliga ===
==== League table ====
Pos	Team	Pld	W	D	L	GF	GA	GD	Pts
8	Karlsruher SC	34	14	10	10	57	55	+2	52
9	Hannover 96	34	13	12	9	41	36	+5	51
10	1. FC Nürnberg	34	14	6	14	60	57	+3	48
11	Hertha BSC	34	12	8	14	49	51	−2	44
12	Darmstadt 98	34	11	9	14	56	55	+1	42

Source: Bundesliga
Rules for classification: 1) Points; 2) Goal difference; 3) Goals scored; 4) Head-to-head results; 5) Head-to-head away goals scored; 6) Away goals scored; 7) Play-off.
(Rules 4–6 only apply after home and away matches have been played between the tied teams.)

==== Results summary ====
Overall								Home						Away					
Pld	W	D	L	GF	GA	GD	Pts	W	D	L	GF	GA	GD	W	D	L	GF	GA	GD
6	2	1	3	8	12	−4	7	1	0	2	3	7	−4	1	1	1	5	5	0

Last updated: 22 September 2024.

==== Results by round ====
Round	1	2	3	4	5	6	7
Ground	A	H	A	H	A	H	A
Result	L	W	D	L	W	L	
Position							

Updated to match(es) played on 22 September 2024. Source:
A = Away; H = Home; W = Win; D = Draw; L = Loss

==== Matches ====
The match schedule was released on 4 July 2024.

3 August 2024 1	Karlsruher SC	3–2	1. FC Nürnberg	Karlsruhe
13:00		Report		Stadium: Wildparkstadion; Attendance: 30,707; Referee: Robin Braun

10 August 2024 2	1. FC Nürnberg	3–1	Schalke 04	Nuremberg
13:00				Stadium: Max-Morlock-Stadion

25 August 2024 3	Darmstadt 98	1–1	1. FC Nürnberg	Darmstadt
13:30				Stadium: Merck-Stadion am Böllenfalltor

31 August 2024 4	1. FC Nürnberg	0–4	1. FC Magdeburg	Nuremberg
13:00				Stadium: Max-Morlock-Stadion

14 September 2024 5	SSV Ulm	1–2	1. FC Nürnberg	Ulm
13:00				Stadium: Donaustadion

21 September 2024 6	1. FC Nürnberg	0–2	Hertha BSC	Nürnberg

29 September 2024 7	Hannover 96	2–0	1. FC Nürnberg	Hanover
13:30				Stadium: Heinz-von-Heiden-Arena

5 October 2024 8	1. FC Nürnberg	3–2	SC Preußen Münster	Nürnberg

20 October 2024 9	Greuther Fürth	0–4	1. FC Nürnberg	Fürth

25 October 2024 10	1. FC Nürnberg	8–3	SSV Jahn Regensburg	Nürnberg

3 November 2024 11	Hamburger SV	1–1	1. FC Nürnberg	Hamburg

8 November 2024 12	1. FC Nürnberg	0–0	1. FC Kaiserslautern	Nürnberg

22 November 2024 13	SC Paderborn	3–2	1. FC Nürnberg	Paderborn

1 December 2024 14	1. FC Nürnberg	2–2	Fortuna Düsseldorf	Nürnberg

6 December 2024 15	SV Elversberg	2–1	1. FC Nürnberg	Elversberg

15 December 2024 16	1. FC Köln	3–1	1. FC Nürnberg	Köln

21 December 2024 17	1. FC Nürnberg	1–0	Eintracht Braunschweig	Nürnberg

19 January 2025 18	1. FC Nürnberg	2–1	Karlsruher SC	Nürnberg

25 January 2025 19	FC Schalke 04	3–1	1. FC Nürnberg	Gelsenkirchen

31 January 2025 20	1. FC Nürnberg	1–0	SV Darmstadt	Nürnberg

=== DFB-Pokal ===
18 August 2024 First round	1. FC Saarbrücken	1–1 (a.e.t.) (3–5 p)	1. FC Nürnberg	Saarbrücken
13:00				Stadium: Ludwigsparkstadion

30 October 2024 Second round	TSG Hoffenheim	2–1	1. FC Nürnberg	Sinsheim
20:45				Stadium: Rhein-Neckar-Arena
