= Uhlsport =

German sporting goods manufacturer

Uhlsport GmbH
- Type: Private
- Industry: Sport, Textile
- Founded: 1948; 78 years ago
- Founder: Karl Uhl
- Headquarters: Balingen, Baden-Württemberg, Germany
- Area served: Worldwide
- Key people: Dirk Hendrik Lehner, Martin Goppelt (Managing Directors)
- Products: List: Sports apparel; Athletic footwear; Goalkeeper gloves; Balls; Protective gear
- Brands: List: Uhlsport; Kempa
- Revenue: ca. 67 million euros (2017)
- Number of employees: 200 (2021)
- Website: uhlsport.group/en/

Uhlsport GmbH (German pronunciation: [ˈuːl.ʃpɔʁt], OOL-sh'port) is a German sporting goods manufacturer. Originally established in 1948 as "Haase & Uhl OHG" and later renamed "Karl Uhl GmbH", the company became "uhlsport GmbH" in 1994. It is an international company which has its permanent headquarters in Balingen in Baden-Württemberg, Germany.

The company manufactures and distributes its products through the brands Uhlsport and Kempa.

== History ==
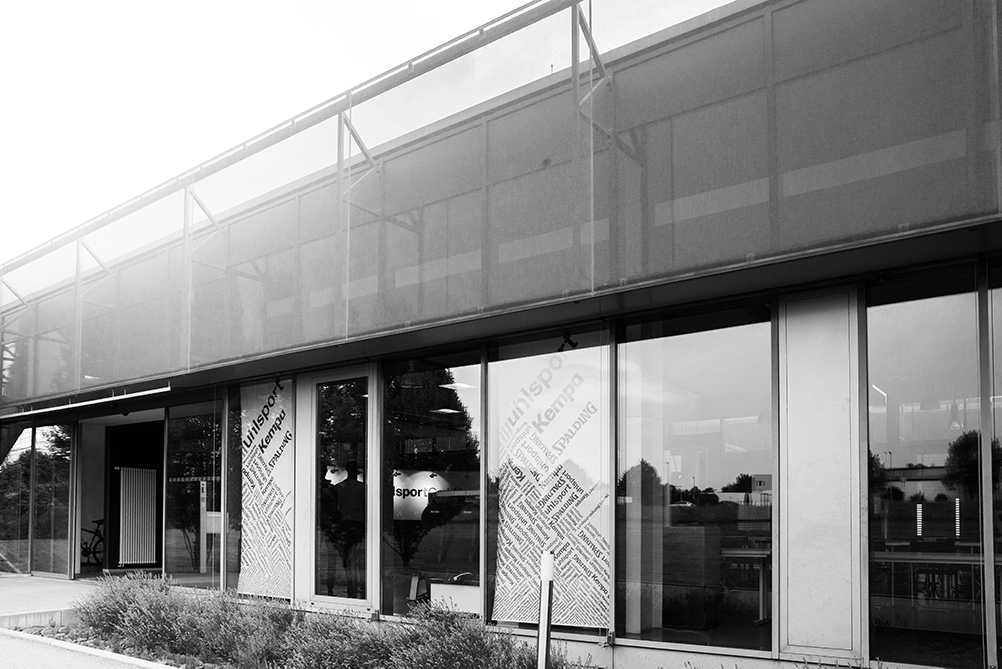
Headquarters of uhlsport GmbH in Balingen

The company was founded in 1948 by Karl Uhl. Early production focussed on manufacturing leather studs for football boots, and in 1953 uhlsport also began to produce football boot soles for sports shoe manufacturers. In the years which followed, more products were added, including shin guards, sports bandages, footballs and goalkeeper gloves, until finally uhlsport GmbH had developed a full range of football equipment. Since 2002, the company has been operating a multi-brand strategy for football and handball.

== Brands and products ==
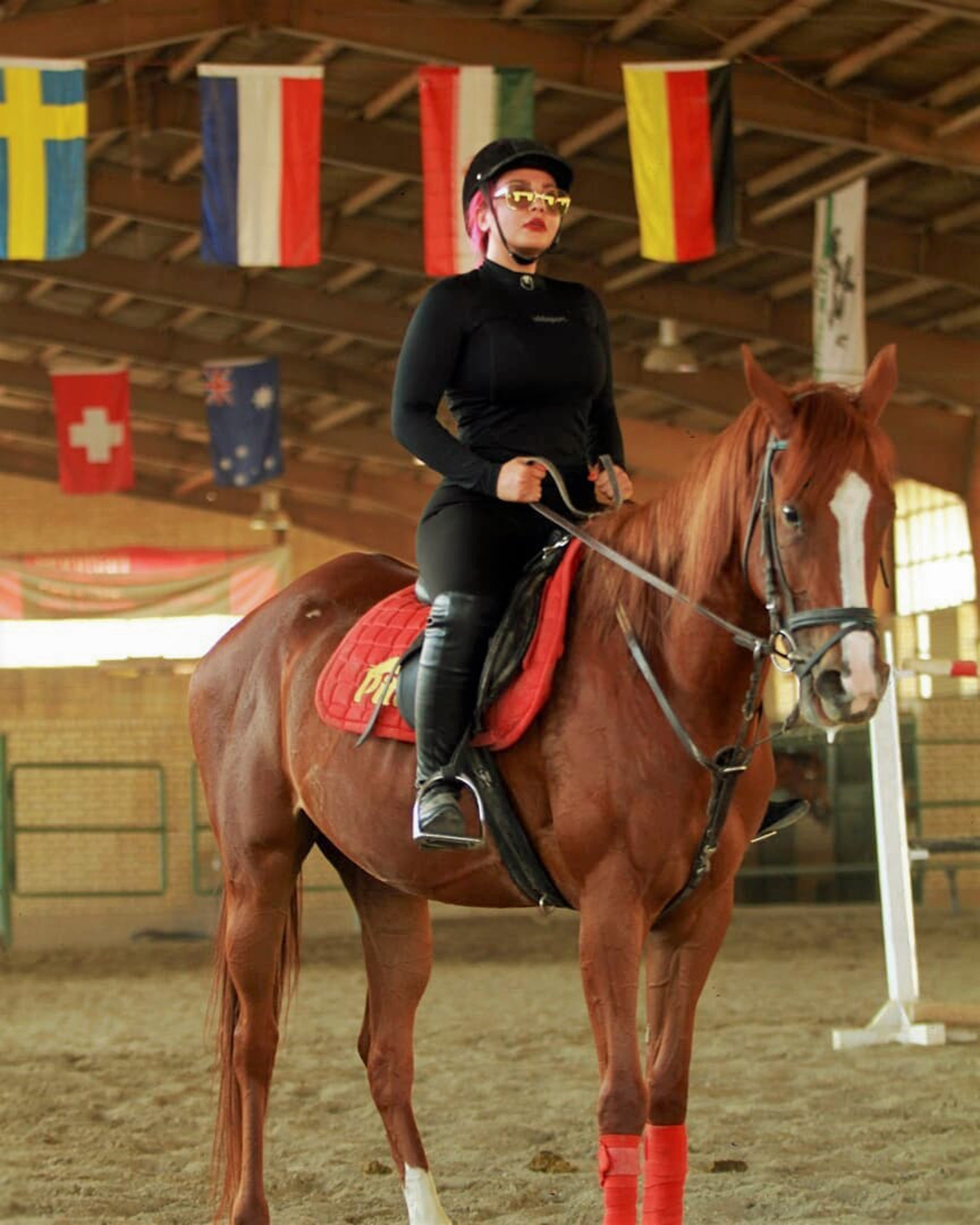
An Iranian woman wearing Uhlsport products in 2018.

The brand "uhlsport" specializes in football, especially goalkeeper equipment. Since 2002, handball equipment has been marketed through the company's own "Kempa" brand.

The German company operates an indirect distribution strategy with subsidiaries in France, Spain, and Sweden and with country managers in UK, Benelux, and Switzerland. Uhlsport has a further 80 distribution partners across the world. In 1998, the Uhl family sold the company to the Daiss family.

== Sponsorship ==
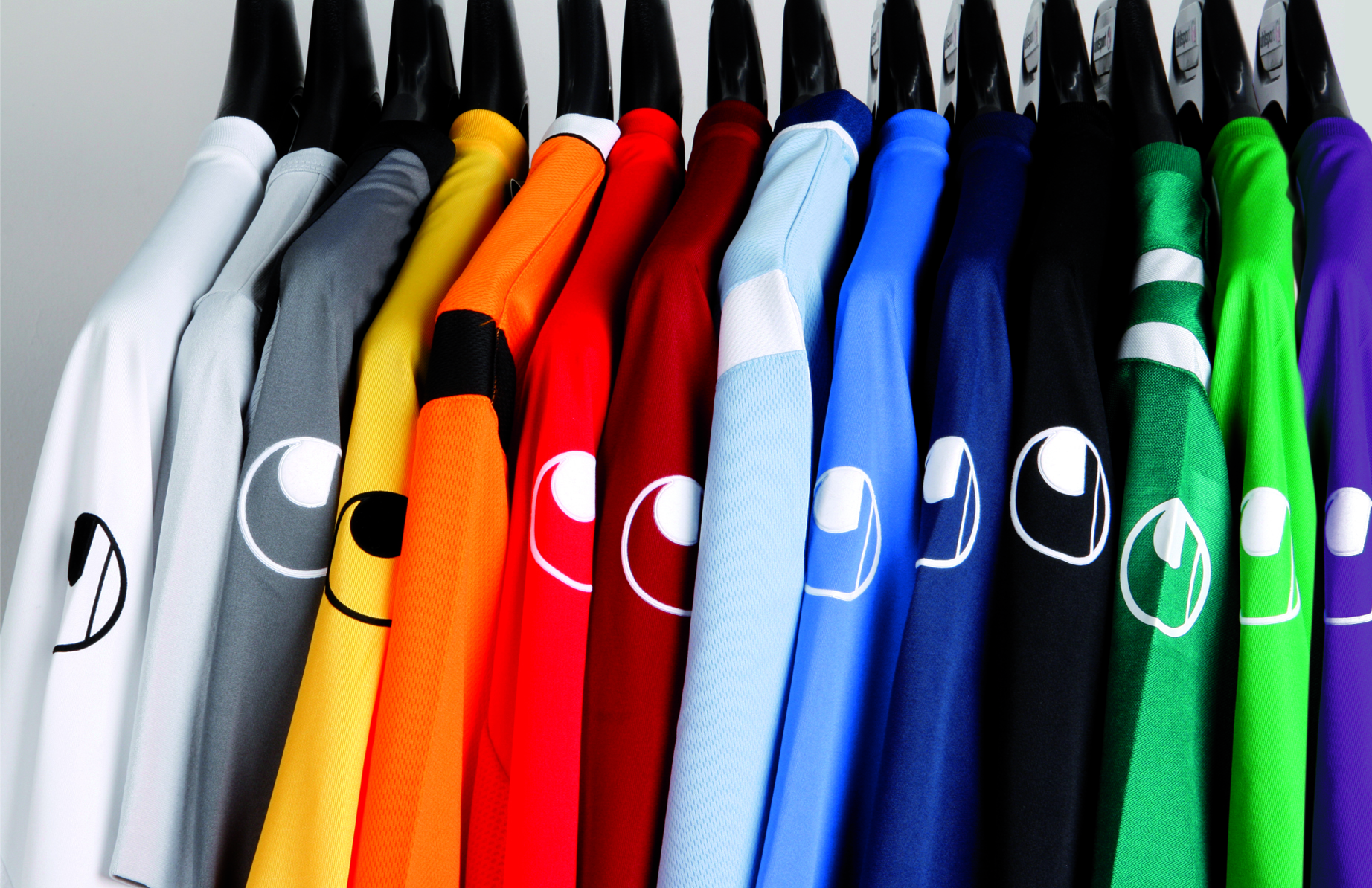
uhlsport Teamwear

Uhlsport is the official equipment supplier to 1. FC Köln and 1. FC Magdeburg, As the official ball sponsor, Uhlsport supports the Croatian SuperSport HNL. The goalkeepers Alphonse Areola, Alexander Schwolow, Mike Maignan, Oliver Baumann, Odysseas Vlachodimos, Fabian Bredlow, Diant Ramaj, Christian Mathenia, Lukas Hradecky, Ron-Robert Zieler, Pauline Peyraud-Magnin, Yassine Bounou, Ofir Marciano, Anthony Lopes and others play with Uhlsport gloves.

Kempa is the official sponsor to HBW Balingen-Weilstetten, TVB 1898 Stuttgart, Bergischer HC, Buxtehuder SV (women) and HSG Bensheim/Auerbach (women). From 2023 Kempa brand has become the new official supplier of the Germany men's national volleyball team.
