= Jens Castrop =

German-born South Korean footballer (born 2003)

Jens Castrop 옌스 카스트로프
Personal information
- Date of birth: 29 July 2003 (age 23)
- Place of birth: Düsseldorf, Germany
- Height: 1.77 m (5 ft 10 in)
- Positions: Midfielder; wing-back

Team information
- Current team: Borussia Mönchengladbach
- Number: 17

Youth career
- –2015: Fortuna Düsseldorf
- 2015–2020: 1. FC Köln

Senior career*
Years	Team	Apps	(Gls)
2020–2023	1. FC Köln II	20	(2)
2022–2023	→ 1. FC Nürnberg (loan)	34	(2)
2022	→ 1. FC Nürnberg II (loan)	7	(1)
2023–2025	1. FC Nürnberg	52	(5)
2025–	Borussia Mönchengladbach	29	(3)

International career^{‡}
2018	Germany U16	2	(0)
2019–2020	Germany U17	6	(0)
2020	Germany U18	2	(1)
2021–2022	Germany U19	6	(1)
2022–2023	Germany U20	6	(0)
2024–2025	Germany U21	4	(0)
2025–	South Korea	8	(0)
- * Club domestic league appearances and goals as of 21 November 2026 ‡ National team caps and goals as of 24 June 2026

Jens Castrop (Korean: 옌스 카스트로프; born 29 July 2003) is a professional footballer who plays as a midfielder or wing-back for Bundesliga club Borussia Mönchengladbach. Born in Germany, he plays for the South Korea national team.

== Club career ==
A native of Düsseldorf, Castrop began his career in the youth academy of Fortuna Düsseldorf. In 2015, he transferred to the academy of Düsseldorf's rival, 1. FC Köln, where he played for the club's under-15 and under-17 teams. In August 2020, Castrop was promoted to the club's first team by manager Markus Gisdol. He also signed a long-term professional contract until June 2023.

In January 2022, it was announced that Castrop would join 2. Bundesliga club 1. FC Nürnberg on a loan deal. In June 2023, the club activated a €450,000 option to sign Castrop on a permanent basis. At Nürnberg, he was deployed on the right flank of midfield or defensive line during the 2022–23 season, moved to central midfield the next season, and performed the role of left attacking midfielder in 2025.

On 2 February 2025, Castrop signed a four-season contract with Bundesliga side Borussia Mönchengladbach, beginning in the 2025–26 season. On 27 September, he scored his first Bundesliga goal in a 6–4 loss to Eintracht Frankfurt. Borussia had a hard time without a win at the bottom of the league early in the season, but he was named the club's Player of the Month for September. On 25 October, he received his first red card at the Bundesliga after tackling Luis Díaz in a 3–0 loss to Bayern Munich. On 21 March 2026, he scored two goals while playing as a left wing-back in a 3–3 draw with 1. FC Köln.

== International career ==
Castrop was born in Germany to a German father and South Korean mother. He played for Germany national youth teams at between under-16 and under-21 level before being affiliated to Korea Football Association. His request to switch international allegiance to South Korea was approved by FIFA on 11 August 2025, and he was called up to the South Korea national team for friendlies held in September. On 6 September, he came on as a 63rd-minute substitute in a 2–0 win over the United States, making his senior international debut.

Castrop was called up to the South Korea squad for the 2026 FIFA World Cup. He played 45 minutes in a 1–0 defeat to South Africa, making his FIFA World Cup debut.

== Career statistics ==
=== Club ===
As of match played on 21 November 2026

Appearances and goals by club, season and competition
Club	Season	League			DFB-Pokal		Continental		Other		Total	
Club	Season	Division	Apps	Goals	Apps	Goals	Apps	Goals	Apps	Goals	Apps	Goals
1. FC Köln II	2020–21	Regionalliga West	5	0	—		—		—		5	0
1. FC Köln II	2021–22	Regionalliga West	15	2	—		—		—		15	2
1. FC Köln II	Total		20	2	—		—		—		20	2
1. FC Nürnberg (loan)	2021–22	2. Bundesliga	5	0	0	0	—		—		5	0
1. FC Nürnberg (loan)	2022–23	2. Bundesliga	29	2	4	0	—		—		33	2
1. FC Nürnberg (loan)	Total		34	2	4	0	—		—		38	2
1. FC Nürnberg II (loan)	2021–22	Regionalliga Bayern	7	1	—		—		—		7	1
1. FC Nürnberg	2023–24	2. Bundesliga	27	2	1	0	—		—		28	2
1. FC Nürnberg	2024–25	2. Bundesliga	25	3	1	0	—		—		26	3
1. FC Nürnberg	Total		52	5	2	0	—		—		54	5
Borussia Mönchengladbach	2025–26	Bundesliga	26	3	2	0	—		—		28	3
Borussia Mönchengladbach	2026–27	Bundesliga	3	0	0	0	—		—		3	0
Borussia Mönchengladbach	Total		29	3	2	0	—		—		31	3
Career total			142	13	8	0	0	0	0	0	150	13

=== International ===
As of match played 24 June 2026

Appearances and goals by national team and year
National team	Year	Apps	Goals
South Korea	2025	5	0
South Korea	2026	3	0
Total		8	0
