= Christian Mathenia =

German footballer (born 1992)

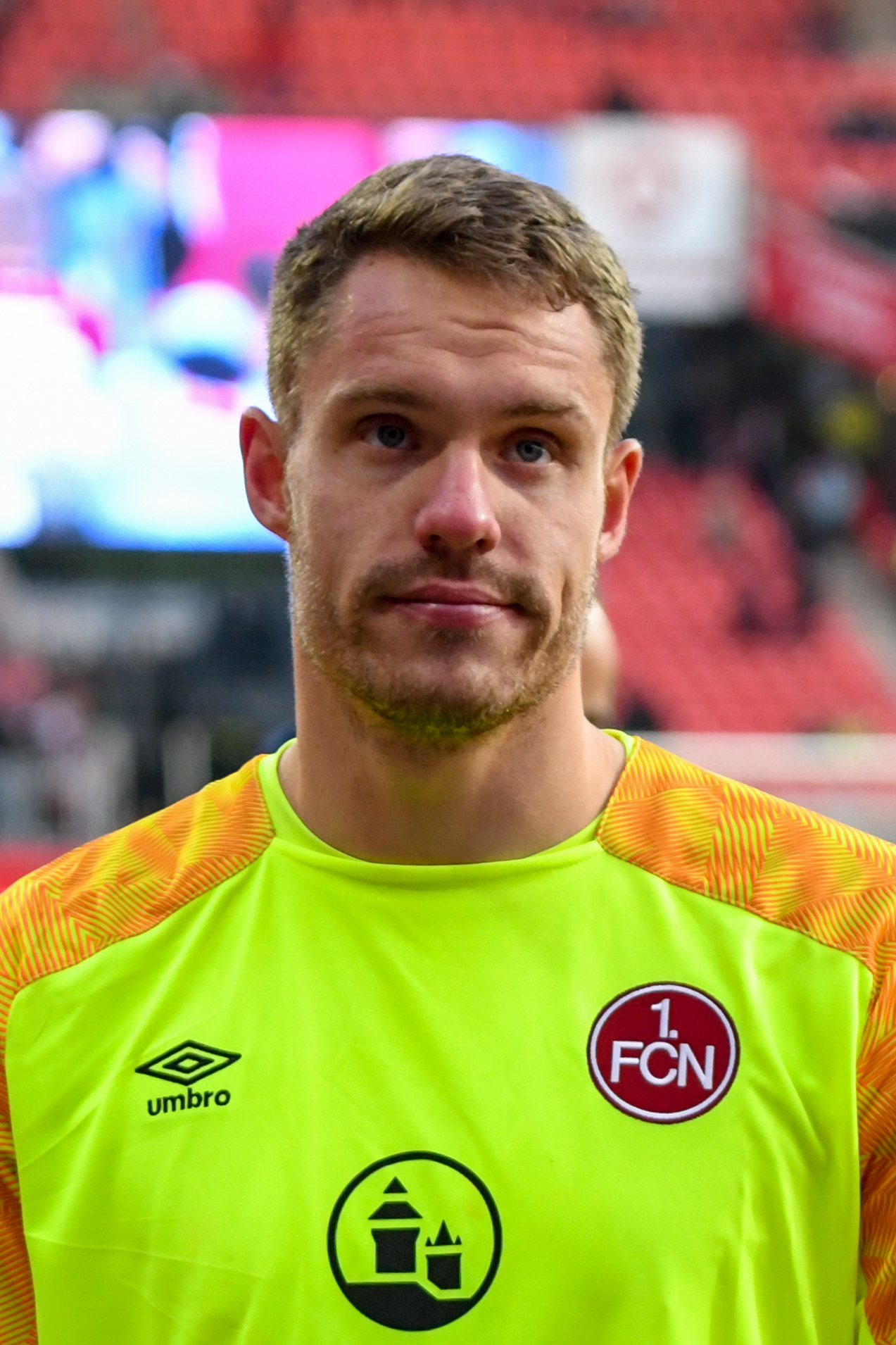
- Mathenia with 1. FC Nürnberg in 2019

Personal information
- Full name: Christian Mathenia
- Date of birth: 31 March 1992 (age 34)
- Place of birth: Mainz, Germany
- Height: 1.89 m (6 ft 2 in)
- Position: Goalkeeper

Team information
- Current team: 1. FC Nürnberg
- Number: 26

Youth career
- VfL Frei-Weinheim
- Hassia Bingen
- 2006–2011: Mainz 05

Senior career*
| Years | Team | Apps | (Gls) |
| 2011–2014 | Mainz 05 II | 51 | (0) |
| 2014–2016 | Darmstadt 98 | 67 | (0) |
| 2016–2018 | Hamburger SV | 38 | (0) |
| 2018– | 1. FC Nürnberg | 147 | (0) |
- * Club domestic league appearances and goals as of 18 May 2026

Christian Mathenia (born 31 March 1992) is a German professional footballer who plays as a goalkeeper for 1. FC Nürnberg in the 2. Bundesliga.

== Club career ==
Mathenia joined SV Darmstadt 98 in 2014 from 1. FSV Mainz 05 II on a free transfer. He made his 2. Bundesliga debut on 3 August 2014 against SV Sandhausen in a 1–0 home win. He went on to become first-choice keeper for the remaining season featuring in all of the 35 games in the league and cup keeping the most clean sheets in the process.

Mathenia joined Hamburger SV in 2016 from SV Darmstadt 98.

== Career statistics ==
As of match played 16 August 2025

Appearances and goals by club, season and competition
| Club | Season | League | | | Cup | | Other | | Total | |
| Club | Season | Division | Apps | Goals | Apps | Goals | Apps | Goals | Apps | Goals |
|---|---|---|---|---|---|---|---|---|---|---|
| Mainz 05 II | 2010–11 | Regionalliga Südwest | 10 | 0 | — | | — | | 10 | 0 |
| Mainz 05 II | 2011–12 | Regionalliga Südwest | 23 | 0 | — | | — | | 23 | 0 |
| Mainz 05 II | 2012–13 | Regionalliga Südwest | 18 | 0 | — | | — | | 18 | 0 |
| Mainz 05 II | Total | | 51 | 0 | — | | — | | 51 | 0 |
| Mainz 05 | 2012–13 | Bundesliga | 0 | 0 | 0 | 0 | — | | 0 | 0 |
| Mainz 05 | 2013–14 | Bundesliga | 0 | 0 | 0 | 0 | — | | 0 | 0 |
| Mainz 05 | Total | | 0 | 0 | 0 | 0 | — | | 0 | 0 |
| Darmstadt 98 | 2014–15 | 2. Bundesliga | 34 | 0 | 1 | 0 | — | | 35 | 0 |
| Darmstadt 98 | 2015–16 | Bundesliga | 33 | 0 | 3 | 0 | — | | 36 | 0 |
| Darmstadt 98 | Total | | 67 | 0 | 4 | 0 | — | | 71 | 0 |
| Hamburger SV | 2016–17 | Bundesliga | 14 | 0 | 0 | 0 | — | | 14 | 0 |
| Hamburger SV | 2017–18 | Bundesliga | 24 | 0 | 1 | 0 | — | | 25 | 0 |
| Hamburger SV | Total | | 38 | 0 | 1 | 0 | — | | 39 | 0 |
| 1. FC Nürnberg | 2018–19 | Bundesliga | 22 | 0 | 2 | 0 | — | | 24 | 0 |
| 1. FC Nürnberg | 2019–20 | 2. Bundesliga | 24 | 0 | 0 | 0 | 2 | 0 | 26 | 0 |
| 1. FC Nürnberg | 2020–21 | 2. Bundesliga | 34 | 0 | 1 | 0 | — | | 35 | 0 |
| 1. FC Nürnberg | 2021–22 | 2. Bundesliga | 33 | 0 | 0 | 0 | — | | 33 | 0 |
| 1. FC Nürnberg | 2022–23 | 2. Bundesliga | 17 | 0 | 1 | 0 | — | | 18 | 0 |
| 1. FC Nürnberg | 2023–24 | 2. Bundesliga | 15 | 0 | 3 | 0 | — | | 18 | 0 |
| 1. FC Nürnberg | 2024–25 | 2. Bundesliga | 1 | 0 | 2 | 0 | — | | 3 | 0 |
| 1. FC Nürnberg | 2025–26 | 2. Bundesliga | 0 | 0 | 1 | 0 | — | | 1 | 0 |
| 1. FC Nürnberg | Total | | 146 | 0 | 10 | 0 | 2 | 0 | 158 | 0 |
| Career total | | | 302 | 0 | 15 | 0 | 2 | 0 | 319 | 0 |
