= Mats Møller Dæhli =

Norwegian footballer (born 1995)

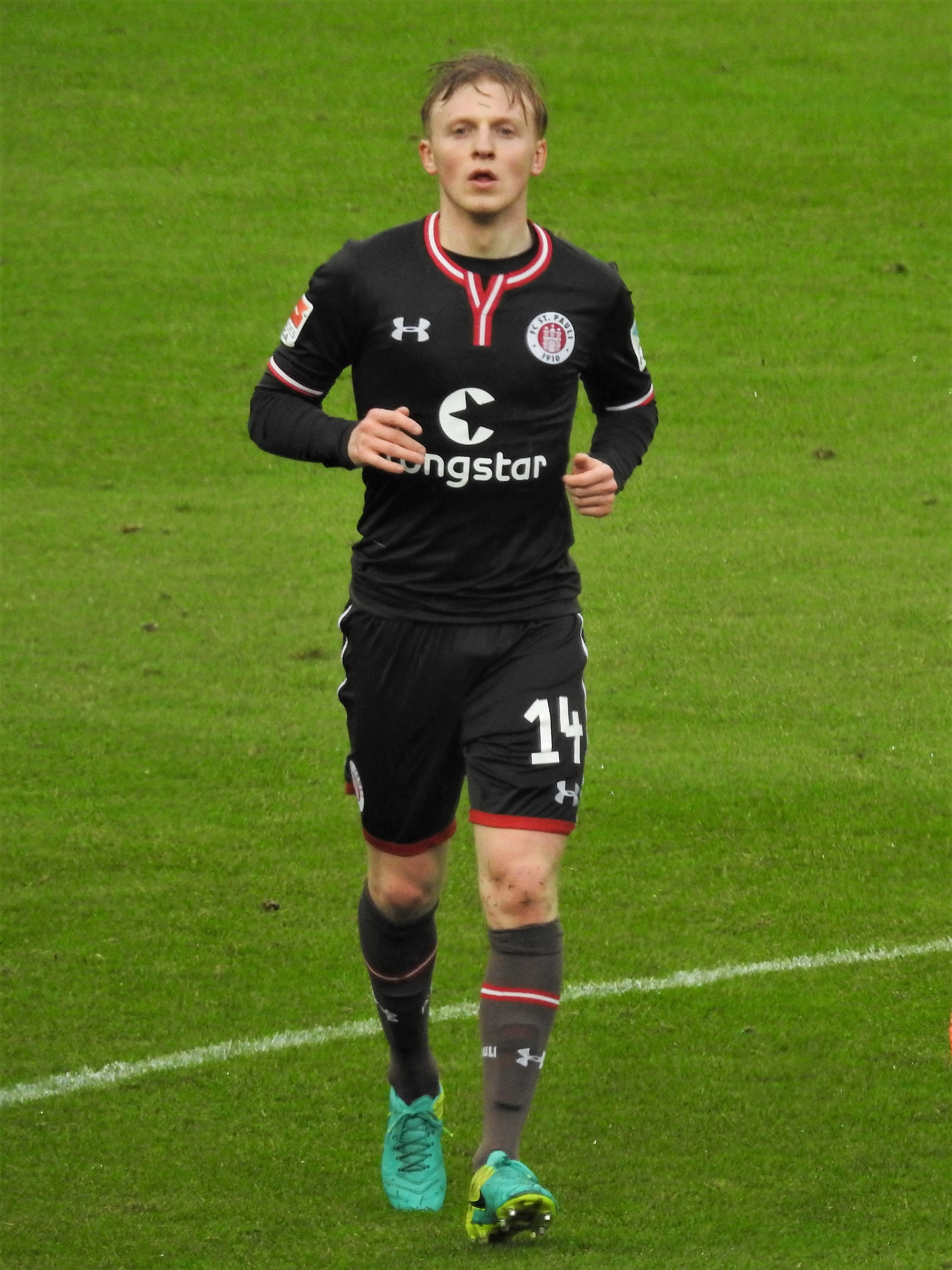
- Dæhli playing for FC St. Pauli in 2017

Personal information
- Full name: Mats Møller Dæhli
- Date of birth: 2 March 1995 (age 31)
- Place of birth: Oslo, Norway
- Height: 1.72 m (5 ft 8 in)
- Position: Midfielder

Team information
- Current team: Molde
- Number: 17

Youth career
- –2010: Lyn
- 2010: Stabæk
- 2010: Lyn
- 2011–2013: Manchester United

Senior career*
Years	Team	Apps	(Gls)
2013–2014	Molde	12	(0)
2014–2015	Cardiff City	22	(1)
2015–2018	SC Freiburg	6	(0)
2015–2018	SC Freiburg II	7	(0)
2017–2018	→ St. Pauli (loan)	34	(2)
2018–2020	St. Pauli	48	(3)
2020–2021	Genk	8	(1)
2021	→ 1. FC Nürnberg (loan)	14	(1)
2021–2024	1. FC Nürnberg	71	(4)
2024–	Molde	47	(0)

International career^{‡}
2010	Norway U15	5	(1)
2011	Norway U16	8	(3)
2012	Norway U18	1	(0)
2013	Norway U19	5	(0)
2013–2016	Norway U21	7	(0)
2013	Norway U23	1	(0)
2013–2023	Norway	36	(2)
- * Club domestic league appearances and goals as of 1 December 2025 ‡ National team caps and goals as of 23 February 2024

Mats Møller Dæhli (born 2 March 1995) is a Norwegian professional footballer who plays as a midfielder for Eliteserien club Molde and the Norway national team.

Born in Oslo, he was previously contracted to English club Manchester United, where he played for the reserve team. He joined Norwegian club Molde, then managed by now former Manchester United striker Ole Gunnar Solskjær, in July 2013 and made his professional debut the same year. He transferred to Cardiff City in January 2014, after Solskjær had been hired as manager of the Welsh club.

Dæhli has been a key player for every Norwegian youth team up to under-19 level. He has also played for the under-21 team, and made the step up to the senior team in 2013.

== Early life ==
Dæhli was born in Oslo to Mette Møller, a photographer for Dagbladet, and Truls Dæhli, a sports journalist for Verdens Gang (VG). He grew up at Ullevål Hageby in Oslo, but lived in London for two years when his father worked as a correspondent for VG. While living in London, the seven-year-old Dæhli attended a training session with Chelsea. After returning to Oslo, he spent most of his childhood playing for Lyn, but after the club was bankrupted in 2010 he had a spell at Stabæk, where he was described by Pål Berg, one of Stabæk's coaches, as "an exceptional talent" having "superior technique". He played for the reserve team in the 2. divisjon, before he returned to Lyn.

Dæhli was discovered at the age of 12 by the talent scout John Vik, who recommended Manchester United to sign the player. Dæhli trained with United a couple of times before he signed a contract with the club in November 2010, and he joined the academy in February 2011.

== Club career ==
=== Manchester United ===
Dæhli signed a professional contract with Manchester United on his 17th birthday, and made his debut for the reserves in the match against West Bromwich later the same month. His skillful performances for Paul McGuinness' Under-18s led to his elevation to the reserve squad in July 2012, and he scored the match-winning goal against Irish side Longford on 22 July 2012 after an assist from countryman Joshua King. He won the "Jimmy Murphy Young Player of the Year award" at the end of his maiden season for Manchester United.

=== Molde ===
In July 2013, Dæhli returned to Norway to sign a two-and-a-half-year contract with former Manchester United forward Ole Gunnar Solskjær's club Molde. He made his professional début when he replaced Daniel Chima at half time in the Tippeligaen game against Brann on 3 August 2013. Solskjær praised Dæhli after his performance in the semi-final of the 2013 Norwegian Football Cup against Lillestrøm, and claimed that Dæhli could have been playing for Manchester United's first-team if he had not returned to Norway. Solskjær also compared him to Adnan Januzaj, stating that the two played together at the under-18 team and that it was Dæhli who won the Player of the Year award. During Dæhli's first eight matches in the Tippeligaen, 91.88% of his passes were successful, and was a contributor to Molde's good form during the second half of the 2013 season. In October 2013 Dæhli was awarded the "Statoil Talent of the Month" award.

=== Cardiff City ===
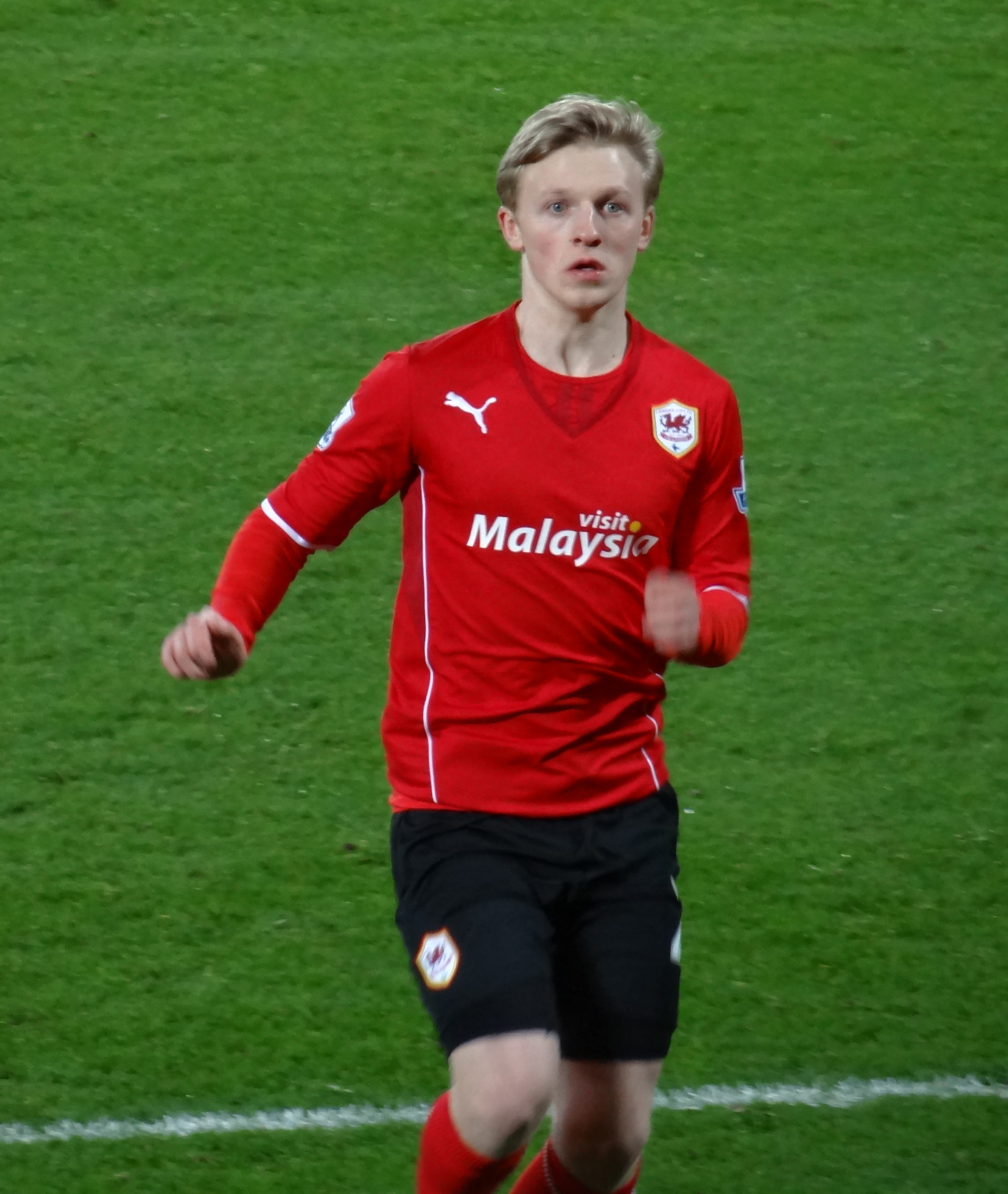
Dæhli playing for Cardiff City in 2014

Dæhli returned to the Premier League on 11 January 2014, joining up with former manager Ole Gunnar Solskjær at Cardiff City for an undisclosed fee, making him their second signing of the window after fellow Norwegian Magnus Wolff Eikrem. Solskjær stated upon signing Dæhli for the second time in his managerial career: "It's taken a bit of time because we've met some competition from Manchester United signing Mats and I'm glad to say he's chosen to come to Cardiff. That shows the desire he has for doing well for Cardiff. Mats is an outstanding talent. He'll be 19 in March, he's just made his debut for Norway - made two appearances in November - so he'll give us energy and enthusiasm."

Dæhli made his debut for Cardiff on 25 January 2014 in the 2013–14 FA Cup fourth round victory over Bolton Wanderers at the Reebok Stadium, coming on for Joe Mason in the 79th minute of the game.

Dæhli scored a 95th-minute equaliser after coming on at half-time as Cardiff twice came back to steal a potentially crucial point against West Bromwich Albion on 29 March 2014.

=== SC Freiburg ===
On 22 December 2014, Dæhli agreed to join Bundesliga club SC Freiburg in the January 2015 transfer window. He made his debut against Borussia Mönchengladbach in a 1–0 defeat.

=== FC St. Pauli ===
On 18 January 2017, Dæhli went on loan to Bundesliga club FC St. Pauli, who had the option of making the transfer permanent when the loan agreement ended on 30 June 2018. The club availed themselves of this opportunity, signing Dæhli permanently on 1 July 2018.

=== Genk ===
On 4 January 2020, St. Pauli announced that Dæhli would be joining Belgian club K.R.C. Genk with immediate effect after three and a half years with the club.

=== 1. FC Nürnberg ===
On 25 January 2021, Dæhli moved to 2.Bundesliga team 1. FC Nürnberg, on a loan deal until the end of the season. The deal included a purchase option. On 21 May 2021, he joined the club permanently.

=== Return to Molde ===
On 8 January 2024, Dæhli returned to Molde on a four-year contract.

== International career ==
Dæhli made his debut for the Norway under-15 team against Sweden U15 in 2010, and in an under-15 tournament against Spain, France and Netherlands in October 2010 he was named "player of the tournament". After his performances for Norway's youth teams, he was dubbed the most talented footballers in Norway by the former footballers Hallvard Thoresen and Nils Johan Semb while Ole Gunnar Solskjær called him one of the biggest talents in Europe and was compared to Xavi by TV 2-pundit Morten Langli.

Dæhli decided in August 2012 to take a break from the Norway youth team, after he was promoted to Manchester United's reserve team to reduce the number of matches, as he was playing for both United's under-18 and reserve teams. The next month he had a meeting with under-21 coach Per Joar Hansen, after the under-21 match against England U-21, where Hansen told Dæhli that he soon wanted Dæhli to play for the under-21 team. After qualifying for the 2013 UEFA European Under-21 Championship, Hansen successor Tor Ole Skullerud, stated that he might include Dæhli in the squad for the championship.

After Dæhli's break from the Norway youth team was over, he was selected in the under-19 squad that was playing three matches at La Manga Club in February 2013. He was suspended from the last match, after receiving yellow cards in the first two matches, and together with Ivar Furu Dæhli was promoted to the under-21 squad that was also playing at La Manga. The 17-year-old made his debut for the under-21 team when he replaced Kristoffer Larsen after 60 minutes in the semi-final of the 2011–13 International Challenge Trophy against Russia U-21 on 7 February 2013. When Skullerud announced the squad for friendly matches against Spain U-21 and Netherlands U-21 he did not call up Dæhli, and stated that because the under-19 team were playing qualification matches as the under-21 championship, he would not bring Dæhli to Israel unless he was a certain starter. Instead of playing in the under-21 championship, Dæhli was a part of the under-19 team that played three matches in the elite qualification for the 2013 UEFA European Under-19 Championship, where Norway finished second behind the Netherlands.

At the age of 18, Dæhli was for the first time called up for the Norway senior team for the friendly matches against Scotland and Denmark in November 2013.

== Career statistics ==
=== Club ===
As of 26 October 2025

Appearances and goals by club, season and competition
Club	Season	League			National Cup (Note: Includes Norwegian Cup, FA Cup, DFB-Pokal)		League Cup (Note: Includes EFL Cup)		Europe		Total	
Club	Season	Division	Apps	Goals	Apps	Goals	Apps	Goals	Apps	Goals	Apps	Goals
Molde	2013	Tippeligaen	12	0	2	0	—		1 (Note: Appearance in UEFA Europa League)	0	15	0
Cardiff City	2013–14	Premier League	13	1	2	0	0	0	—		15	1
Cardiff City	2014–15	Championship	9	0	0	0	2	0	—		11	0
Cardiff City	Total		22	1	2	0	2	0	—		26	1
SC Freiburg	2014–15	Bundesliga	2	0	0	0	—		—		2	0
SC Freiburg	2015–16	2. Bundesliga	2	0	0	0	—		—		2	0
SC Freiburg	2016–17	Bundesliga	2	0	2	1	—		—		4	1
SC Freiburg	Total		6	0	2	1	—		—		8	1
SC Freiburg II	2014–15	Regionalliga Südwest	2	0	—		—		—		2	0
SC Freiburg II	2015–16	Regionalliga Südwest	5	0	—		—		—		5	0
SC Freiburg II	Total		7	0	—		—		—		7	0
FC St. Pauli (loan)	2016–17	2. Bundesliga	13	2	0	0	—		—		13	2
FC St. Pauli (loan)	2017–18	2. Bundesliga	21	0	1	0	—		—		22	0
FC St. Pauli	2018–19	2. Bundesliga	32	2	1	0	—		—		33	2
FC St. Pauli	2019–20	2. Bundesliga	16	1	2	0	—		—		18	1
FC St. Pauli	Total		82	5	4	0	—		—		86	5
Genk	2019–20	Jupiler Pro League	3	1	0	0	—		—		3	1
Genk	2020–21	Jupiler Pro League	5	0	0	0	—		—		5	0
Genk	Total		8	1	0	0	—		—		8	1
1. FC Nürnberg (loan)	2020–21	2. Bundesliga	14	1	0	0	—		—		14	1
1. FC Nürnberg	2021–22	2. Bundesliga	33	3	2	0	—		—		35	3
1. FC Nürnberg	2022–23	2. Bundesliga	30	1	4	0	—		—		34	1
1. FC Nürnberg	2023–24	2. Bundesliga	8	0	1	0	—		—		9	0
1. FC Nürnberg	Total		85	5	7	0	—		—		92	5
Molde	2024	Eliteserien	23	0	3	0	—		14 (Note: Appearances in UEFA Europa Conference League)	1	40	1
Molde	2025	Eliteserien	20	0	4	0	—		0	0	24	0
Molde	Total		43	0	7	0	—		14	1	64	1
Career total			265	12	24	1	2	0	15	1	306	14

=== International ===
As of 23 February 2024

Appearances and goals by national team and year
National team	Year	Apps	Goals
Norway	2013	2	0
Norway	2014	9	1
Norway	2015	1	0
Norway	2016	1	0
Norway	2017	7	0
Norway	2018	1	0
Norway	2019	2	0
Norway	2020	1	0
Norway	2021	5	0
Norway	2022	6	1
Norway	2023	1	0
Total		36	2

Scores and results list Norway's goal tally first, score column indicates score after each Dæhli goal

List of international goals scored by Mats Møller Dæhli
No.	Date	Venue	Opponent	Score	Result	Competition	Ref.
1	10 October 2014	Ta' Qali National Stadium, Ta' Qali, Malta	Malta	1–0	3–0	2016 UEFA Euro qualification	
2	29 March 2022	Ullevaal Stadion, Oslo, Norway	Armenia	7–0	9–0	Friendly	

== Honours ==
Molde

- Norwegian Football Cup: 2013

Individual

- Jimmy Murphy Young Player of the Year: 2011–12
