= Jannes Horn =

German footballer (born 1997)

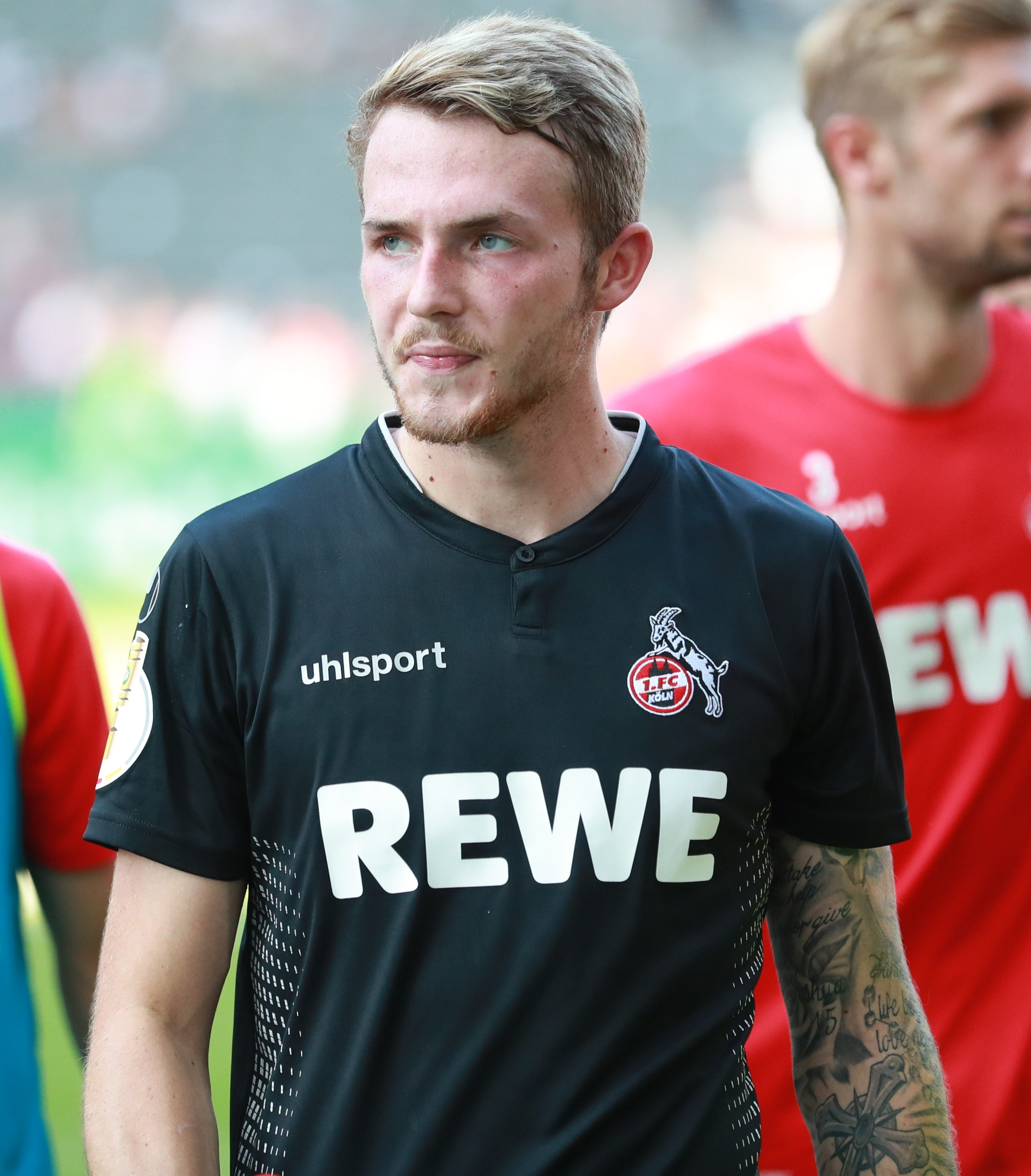
- Horn with 1. FC Köln in 2018

Personal information
- Full name: Jannes-Kilian Horn
- Date of birth: 6 February 1997 (age 29)
- Place of birth: Braunschweig, Germany
- Height: 1.86 m (6 ft 1 in)
- Position: Left-back

Team information
- Current team: SK Rapid Wien
- Number: 38

Youth career
- –2008: Rot-Weiß Braunschweig
- 2008–2016: VfL Wolfsburg

Senior career*
| Years | Team | Apps | (Gls) |
| 2016–2017 | VfL Wolfsburg II | 4 | (0) |
| 2016–2017 | VfL Wolfsburg | 13 | (0) |
| 2017–2022 | 1. FC Köln | 69 | (0) |
| 2019–2020 | → Hannover 96 (loan) | 21 | (0) |
| 2022–2023 | VfL Bochum | 2 | (0) |
| 2023 | → 1. FC Nürnberg (loan) | 7 | (0) |
| 2023–2025 | 1. FC Nürnberg | 27 | (0) |
| 2024–2025 | → St. Louis City (loan) | 18 | (0) |
| 2025– | SK Rapid Wien | 31 | (2) |

International career
| 2012–2013 | Germany U16 | 5 | (1) |
| 2014–2015 | Germany U18 | 5 | (0) |
| 2015–2016 | Germany U19 | 11 | (0) |
| 2016–2017 | Germany U20 | 2 | (0) |
| 2017 | Germany U21 | 2 | (0) |
- * Club domestic league appearances and goals as of 24 October 2026

Jannes-Kilian Horn (born 6 February 1997) is a German professional footballer who plays as a left-back for Austrian Football Bundesliga club SK Rapid Wien.

== Career ==
Horn spent his youth career at VfL Wolfsburg, where he was promoted to the first team during the 2016–17 season. In June 2017, Horn joined 1. FC Köln who had recently qualified for the UEFA Europa League.

On 15 August 2019, Horn joined Hannover 96 on a loan deal until the end of 2019–20 season. After Timo Hübers was infected with COVID-19, all Hannover 96 players were tested, but only Horn was tested positive. According to the club, his case had no connection to Hübers' case.

On 25 July 2022, Horn signed a two-year deal with VfL Bochum. On 7 January 2023, he moved on loan to 1. FC Nürnberg in 2. Bundesliga.

On 29 June 2023, Horn signed a permanent contract with 1. FC Nürnberg.

On 2 August 2024, Horn moved on loan to St. Louis City until 30 June 2025, with an option to buy.

On 20 June 2025, Horn joined SK Rapid Wien in Austria on a two-year deal.

== Career statistics ==
As of match played 24 October 2026

Appearances and goals by club, season and competition
| Club | Season | League | | | Cup | | Continental | | Other | | Total | |
| Club | Season | Division | Apps | Goals | Apps | Goals | Apps | Goals | Apps | Goals | Apps | Goals |
|---|---|---|---|---|---|---|---|---|---|---|---|---|
| VfL Wolfsburg II | 2016–17 | Regionalliga Nord | 4 | 0 | — | | — | | — | | 4 | 0 |
| VfL Wolfsburg | 2016–17 | Bundesliga | 13 | 0 | 0 | 0 | — | | 0 | 0 | 13 | 0 |
| 1. FC Köln | 2017–18 | Bundesliga | 11 | 0 | 2 | 0 | 2 (Note: Appearances in UEFA Europa League) | 0 | — | | 15 | 0 |
| 1. FC Köln | 2018–19 | 2. Bundesliga | 18 | 0 | 1 | 0 | — | | — | | 19 | 0 |
| 1. FC Köln | 2020–21 | Bundesliga | 29 | 0 | 2 | 0 | — | | 1 (Note: Appearance in Bundesliga relegation playoffs) | 0 | 32 | 0 |
| 1. FC Köln | 2021–22 | Bundesliga | 11 | 0 | 1 | 0 | — | | — | | 12 | 0 |
| 1. FC Köln | Total | | 69 | 0 | 6 | 0 | 2 | 0 | 1 | 0 | 78 | 0 |
| Hannover 96 (loan) | 2020–21 | 2. Bundesliga | 23 | 0 | — | | — | | — | | 23 | 1 |
| VfL Bochum | 2022–23 | Bundesliga | 2 | 0 | 1 | 0 | — | | — | | 3 | 0 |
| 1. FC Nürnberg (loan) | 2022–23 | 2. Bundesliga | 7 | 0 | 1 | 0 | — | | — | | 8 | 0 |
| 1. FC Nürnberg | 2023–24 | 2. Bundesliga | 27 | 0 | 2 | 0 | — | | — | | 29 | 0 |
| St. Louis City (loan) | 2024 | Major League Soccer | 9 | 0 | — | | — | | 0 | 0 | 9 | 0 |
| St. Louis City (loan) | 2025 | Major League Soccer | 9 | 0 | 2 | 0 | — | | — | | 11 | 0 |
| St. Louis City (loan) | Total | | 18 | 0 | 2 | 0 | — | | — | | 20 | 0 |
| Rapid Wien | 2025–26 | Austrian Bundesliga | 21 | 0 | 2 | 0 | 8 (Note: Appearances in UEFA Conference League) | 1 | — | | 31 | 1 |
| Rapid Wien | 2026–27 | Austrian Bundesliga | 10 | 2 | 1 | 0 | 4 | 0 | — | | 15 | 2 |
| Rapid Wien | Total | | 31 | 2 | 3 | 0 | 12 | 1 | — | | 46 | 3 |
| Career total | | | 194 | 2 | 15 | 0 | 14 | 1 | 1 | 0 | 224 | 3 |
