= Nathaniel Brown (footballer) =

German footballer (born 2003)

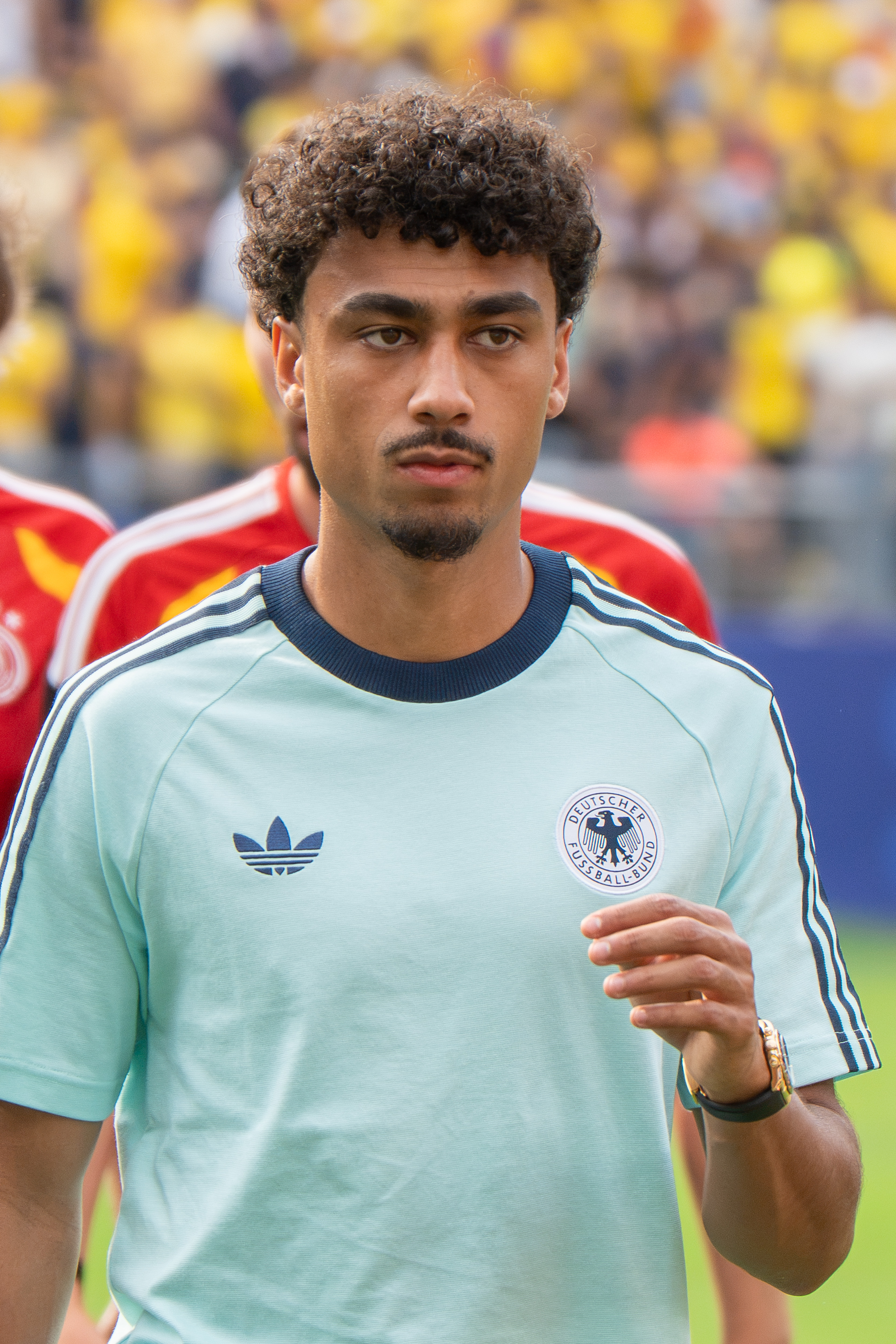
- Brown with Germany in 2026

Personal information
- Full name: Nathaniel Christopher Brown
- Date of birth: 16 June 2003 (age 23)
- Place of birth: Amberg, Germany
- Height: 1.76 m (5 ft 9 in)
- Position: Left-back

Team information
- Current team: Bayern Munich
- Number: 11

Youth career
- TSV Kümmersbruck
- 2011–2016: Jahn Regensburg
- 2016–2022: 1. FC Nürnberg

Senior career*
| Years | Team | Apps | (Gls) |
| 2022–2023 | 1. FC Nürnberg II | 27 | (1) |
| 2023–2024 | 1. FC Nürnberg | 24 | (1) |
| 2024–2026 | Eintracht Frankfurt | 58 | (7) |
| 2024 | → 1. FC Nürnberg (loan) | 16 | (0) |
| 2026– | Bayern Munich | 10 | (2) |

International career^{‡}
| 2023–2025 | Germany U21 | 14 | (1) |
| 2025– | Germany | 11 | (1) |
Medal record
Men's football
Representing Germany
UEFA European Under-21 Championship
| Runner-up | 2025 Slovakia |
- * Club domestic league appearances and goals as of 21:24, 20 November 2026 (UTC) ‡ National team caps and goals as of 21:40, 16 November 2026 (UTC)

Nathaniel Christopher "Nene" Brown (born 16 June 2003) is a German professional footballer who plays as a left-back or midfielder for Bundesliga club Bayern Munich and the Germany national team.

== Club career ==
=== 1. FC Nürnberg ===
Brown is a youth product of TSV Kümmersbruck and Jahn Regensburg, before joining Nürnberg's youth academy in 2016. On 15 June 2022, he signed his first professional contract with Nürnberg. He began his senior career with Nürnberg's reserves in 2022 in the Regionalliga. On 10 March 2023, he debuted with the senior Nürnberg team in a 2–0 2. Bundesliga win over Eintracht Braunschweig as a late substitute. On 27 June 2023, he extended professional contract with Nürnberg.

=== Eintracht Frankfurt ===
On 3 January 2024, Brown signed for Bundesliga club Eintracht Frankfurt on a five-and-a-half-year deal, returning to Nürnberg on loan for the remainder of the season. On 2 November 2024, he scored his first Bundesliga goal in a 7–2 victory over Bochum. He was voted his club's Player of the Season for 2025–26, having recorded four goals and four assists in the league, as well as two assists in the UEFA Champions League.

=== Bayern Munich ===
On 3 July 2026, Brown moved to fellow Bundesliga club Bayern Munich on a five-year deal. A month later, on 22 August, he made his debut and scored his first goal for the club in a 2–1 away victory over Borussia Dortmund in the Franz Beckenbauer Supercup.

== International career ==
Brown was born in Germany to an African American father and a German mother, and as a result, he was also previously eligible to represent the United States.

Brown was a youth international for Germany, having played for the Germany U21s. In October 2025, he was named to the German senior squad. On 10 October 2025, he made his debut for the senior team after coming on as a substitute in a 4–0 win over Luxembourg.

On 21 May 2026, Brown was named in the 26-man squad for the 2026 FIFA World Cup. On 14 June 2026, he scored his first international goal to put Germany ahead 5–1 over Curaçao in their opening match which was eventually won 7–1.

== Personal life ==
Brown is the son of a German mother and a black American father.

== Career statistics ==
=== Club ===
As of match played 20 November 2026

Appearances and goals by club, season and competition
| Club | Season | League | | | DFB-Pokal | | Europe | | Other | | Total | |
| Club | Season | Division | Apps | Goals | Apps | Goals | Apps | Goals | Apps | Goals | Apps | Goals |
|---|---|---|---|---|---|---|---|---|---|---|---|---|
| 1. FC Nürnberg II | 2021–22 | Regionalliga Bayern | 7 | 0 | — | | — | | — | | 7 | 0 |
| 1. FC Nürnberg II | 2022–23 | Regionalliga Bayern | 20 | 1 | — | | — | | — | | 20 | 1 |
| 1. FC Nürnberg II | Total | | 27 | 1 | — | | — | | — | | 27 | 1 |
| 1. FC Nürnberg | 2022–23 | 2. Bundesliga | 11 | 1 | 0 | 0 | — | | — | | 11 | 1 |
| 1. FC Nürnberg | 2023–24 | 2. Bundesliga | 13 | 0 | 3 | 0 | — | | — | | 16 | 0 |
| 1. FC Nürnberg | Total | | 24 | 1 | 3 | 0 | — | | — | | 27 | 1 |
| Eintracht Frankfurt | 2024–25 | Bundesliga | 25 | 3 | 3 | 0 | 4 (Note: Appearances in UEFA Europa League) | 0 | — | | 32 | 3 |
| Eintracht Frankfurt | 2025–26 | Bundesliga | 33 | 4 | 1 | 0 | 7 (Note: Appearances in UEFA Champions League) | 0 | — | | 41 | 4 |
| Eintracht Frankfurt | Total | | 57 | 7 | 4 | 0 | 11 | 0 | — | | 72 | 7 |
| 1. FC Nürnberg (loan) | 2023–24 | 2. Bundesliga | 16 | 0 | — | | — | | 0 | 0 | 16 | 0 |
| Bayern Munich | 2026–27 | Bundesliga | 10 | 2 | 2 | 1 | 3 | 0 | 1 (Note: Appearance in Franz Beckenbauer Supercup) | 1 | 16 | 4 |
| Career total | | | 135 | 11 | 9 | 1 | 14 | 0 | 1 | 1 | 159 | 13 |

=== International ===
As of match played 16 November 2026

Appearances and goals by national team and year
| National team | Year | Apps | Goals |
|---|---|---|---|
| Germany | 2025 | 2 | 0 |
| Germany | 2026 | 9 | 1 |
| Total | | 11 | 1 |

Germany score listed first, score column indicates score after each Brown goal.

List of international goals scored by Nathaniel Brown
| No. | Date | Venue | Cap | Opponent | Score | Result | Competition |
|---|---|---|---|---|---|---|---|
| 1 | 14 June 2026 | NRG Stadium, Houston, United States | 6 | Curaçao | 5–1 | 7–1 | 2026 FIFA World Cup |

== Honours ==
Bayern Munich

- Franz Beckenbauer Supercup: 2026

Germany U21

- UEFA European Under-21 Championship runner-up: 2025
