= Benjamin Goller =

German footballer

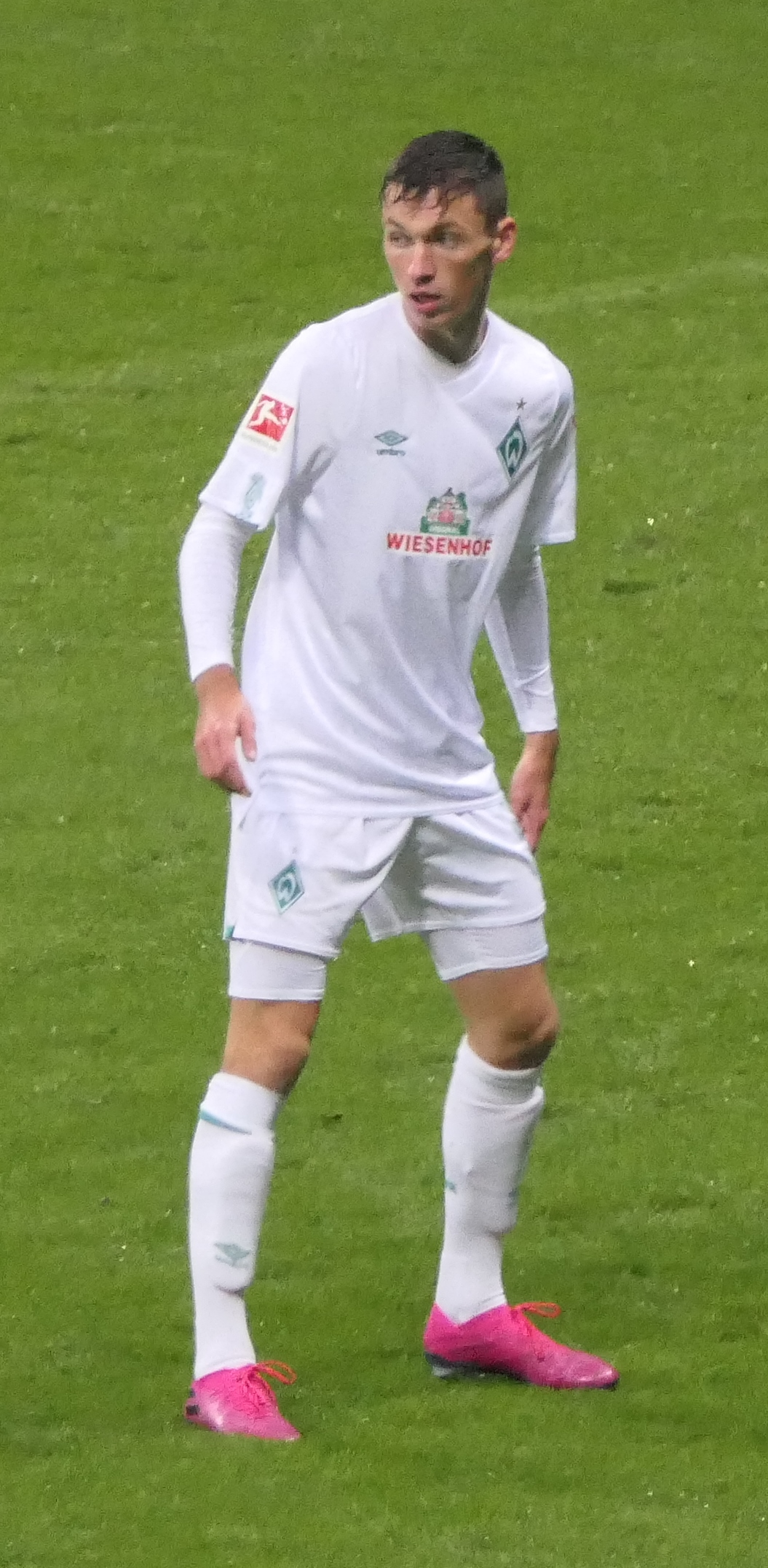
- Goller playing for Werder Bremen in 2019

Personal information
- Date of birth: 1 January 1999 (age 27)
- Place of birth: Reutlingen, Germany
- Height: 1.80 m (5 ft 11 in)
- Position: Right winger

Team information
- Current team: SSV Ulm
- Number: 7

Youth career
- –2011: TSV Holzelfingen
- 2011–2014: VfL Pfullingen
- 2014–2016: Stuttgarter Kickers
- 2016–2018: Schalke 04

Senior career*
Years	Team	Apps	(Gls)
2018–2019	Schalke 04 II	11	(1)
2018–2019	Schalke 04	0	(0)
2019–2022	Werder Bremen	10	(0)
2020–2022	Werder Bremen II	3	(1)
2020–2021	→ Karlsruher SC (loan)	27	(4)
2021–2022	→ Darmstadt 98 (loan)	11	(2)
2022	→ Karlsruher SC (loan)	13	(1)
2023–2025	1. FC Nürnberg	47	(2)
2025–2026	1. FC Nürnberg II	0	(0)
2026–	SSV Ulm	3	(1)

International career
2016–2017	Germany U18	3	(0)
2017–2018	Germany U19	5	(1)
2018–2019	Germany U20	6	(0)
- * Club domestic league appearances and goals as of 24 September 2026

Benjamin Goller (born 1 January 1999) is a German professional footballer who plays as a right winger for Regionalliga Südwest club SSV Ulm. He has represented Germany internationally at youth levels U18 through U20.

== Club career ==
=== Youth career and Schalke 04 ===
Goller began his youth career with TSV Holzelfingen, before moving to the youth team of VfL Pfullingen in 2011, and later Stuttgarter Kickers in 2014. In 2016, he joined the youth sector of Schalke 04.

For the 2018–19 season, Goller was promoted to Schalke's reserve team, playing in the Oberliga Westfalen. He made his debut for the reserve team on 1 September 2018, starting against 1. FC Gievenbeck before being substituted off in the 64th minute for Jānis Grīnbergs. The match finished as a 2–0 home loss.

On 11 December 2018, Goller made his first team debut for Schalke in the UEFA Champions League, starting against Lokomotiv Moscow before being substituted out in the 59th minute for Amine Harit. The match finished as a 1–0 home win.

=== Werder Bremen and loans ===
In July 2020, Goller joined 2. Bundesliga club Karlsruher SC on loan from Werder Bremen.

In June 2021 it was announced that he would move to Darmstadt 98 on loan for the 2021–22 season.

Goller's loan to Darmstadt 98 was cut short on 31 January 2022, the last day of the 2022 winter transfer window, and he returned to former club Karlsruher SC for a further loan.

=== 1. FC Nürnberg ===
In December 2022 it was announced Goller would join 2. Bundesliga side 1. FC Nürnberg in January 2023. He signed a long-term contract.

On 1 September 2025, the club announced that Goller will not play for the club anymore, but as he is still under contract, he will train with their reserve team 1. FC Nürnberg II (but not play in official games for the reserves either), until a suitable transfer can be arranged.

== International career ==
Goller began his youth international career with the Germany under-18 team, making his debut on 13 November 2016 in the international friendly against the Republic of Ireland. He started the match, which finished as a 3–2 win, before being substituted out in the 65th minute for Gabriel Kyeremateng. On 5 September 2017, he scored for the under-19 team in the third minute of a friendly match against England, putting Germany up 2–0. The match finished as a 3–1 win.

== Career statistics ==
=== Club ===
As of match played 26 November 2023

Appearances and goals by club, season and competition
Club	Season	League			Cup		Europe		Total	
Club	Season	Division	Apps	Goals	Apps	Goals	Apps	Goals	Apps	Goals
Schalke 04 II	2018–19	Oberliga Westfalen	11	1	—		—		11	1
Schalke 04	2018–19	Bundesliga	0	0	0	0	1 (Note: Appearance in UEFA Champions League)	0	1	0
Werder Bremen	2019–20	Bundesliga	10	0	1	0	—		11	0
Werder Bremen II	2019–20	Regionalliga Nord	2	1	–		—		2	1
Werder Bremen II	2022–23	Regionalliga Nord	1	0	–		—		1	0
Werder Bremen II	Total		3	1	0	0	0	0	3	1
Karlsruher SC (loan)	2020–21	2. Bundesliga	27	4	1	0	—		28	4
Darmstadt 98 (loan)	2021–22	2. Bundesliga	11	2	1	0	—		12	2
Karlsruher SC (loan)	2021–22	2. Bundesliga	13	1	1	0	—		14	1
1. FC Nürnberg	2022–23	2. Bundesliga	7	0	0	0	—		7	0
1. FC Nürnberg	2023–24	2. Bundesliga	12	2	2	1	—		14	3
1. FC Nürnberg	Total		19	2	2	1	0	0	21	3
Career total			94	11	6	1	1	0	101	12
