= Joseph Hungbo =

English footballer (born 2000)

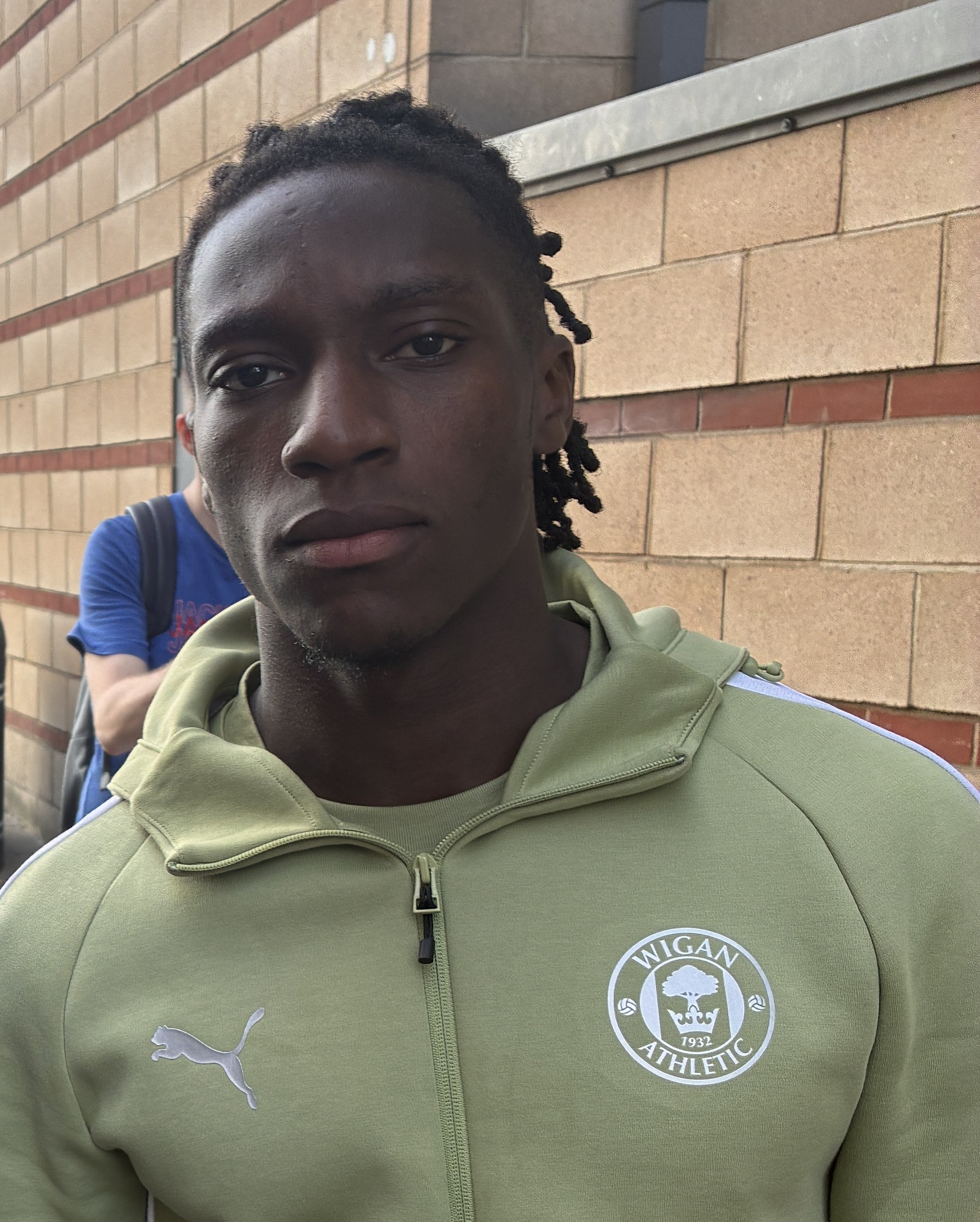
- Joseph Hungbo in 2025.

Personal information
- Full name: Joseph Oluwagbemiga Mayowa Hungbo
- Date of birth: 15 January 2000 (age 26)
- Place of birth: Lambeth, England
- Height: 1.73 m (5 ft 8 in)
- Position: Winger

Team information
- Current team: Swindon Town (on loan from Wigan Athletic)
- Number: 15

Youth career
- Crystal Palace

Senior career*
Years	Team	Apps	(Gls)
2018–2019	Crystal Palace	0	(0)
2019	→ Margate (loan)	9	(0)
2019–2023	Watford	12	(0)
2020	→ Aldershot Town (loan)	6	(0)
2021–2022	→ Ross County (loan)	33	(7)
2023	→ Huddersfield Town (loan)	14	(3)
2023–2025	1. FC Nürnberg	17	(0)
2024–2025	→ Rotherham United (loan)	13	(0)
2025–	Wigan Athletic	43	(0)
2026–	→ Swindon Town (loan)	6	(1)
- * Club domestic league appearances and goals as of 20:48, 4 October 2026 (UTC)

Joseph Oluwagbemiga Mayowa Hungbo (born 15 January 2000) is an English professional footballer who plays as a winger for EFL League Two side Swindon Town on loan from EFL League One club Wigan Athletic.

== Club career ==
=== Early career ===
As a child, Hungbo played for local side Hillyfielders FC. He was spotted by Crystal Palace in 2009 when he joined his brother Jacob at session run by a club coach at Peckham Rye Park. Following a trial, he signed for the club's under-9s. He was named the club's u9-u16 player of the year for 2015–16 and started a two-year scholarship in summer 2016, later captaining the club's under-18 side.

=== Crystal Palace ===
In summer 2018, Hungbo became a professional, signing a one-year contract with the club. He was loaned to Isthmian Premier Division side Margate in January 2019 for the rest of the 2018–19 season. Playing under Mike Sandmann, his former under-9s coach at Palace, he made nine appearances.

=== Watford ===
In summer 2019 Hungbo was released by Crystal Palace and subsequently signed for fellow Premier League side Watford. On 4 December 2019, after an impressive run of form for Watford's under-23s, Hungbo travelled with the first team squad for an away Premier League game against Leicester City. On 23 January 2020, Hungbo made his senior debut for Watford, starting in a 2–1 FA Cup third round replay defeat away at Tranmere Rovers.

Hungbo joined National League side Aldershot Town on a short-term loan deal on 12 November 2020. After featuring in six league games for the Shots, Hungbo returned to Watford on 8 January 2021.

==== Loan to Ross County ====
On 17 August 2021, Hungbo joined Scottish Premiership club Ross County on a season-long loan. On 22 August 2021, he made his debut as a substitute for David Cancola in a 4–2 home league loss against Rangers. In Ross County's first victory of the season, he scored a stunning free kick - a goal that would end up winning him the SPFL Goal of the Month.

==== Loan to Huddersfield Town ====
On 16 January 2023, Hungbo joined fellow EFL Championship side Huddersfield Town on loan for the remainder of the 2022–23 season.

=== Nürnberg ===
On 19 July 2023, Hungbo completed a transfer to 2. Bundesliga club 1. FC Nürnberg for an undisclosed fee.

==== Rotherham United (loan) ====
On 10 July 2024, Hungbo returned to England, joining League One side Rotherham United on a season-long loan deal.

=== Wigan Athletic ===
On 3 January 2025, Hungbo returned to England on a permanent basis, signing for League One side Wigan Athletic on a three-and-a-half year deal for an undisclosed fee.

On 3 August 2026, Hungbo joined Swindon Town on a season-long loan.

== Personal life ==
Hungbo is the fifth of six children born to Samuel, a Nigerian, and Rachel, a Togolese. His parents and three oldest brothers emigrated to London from Nigeria in the mid-1990s. Hungbo, an older brother, Jacob, and younger sister, Elizabeth, were all born in the United Kingdom. He was raised in Camberwell, and attended Sacred Heart Catholic School in Camberwell for secondary school before moving to the Crystal Palace affiliated Oasis Academy Shirley Park.

== Career statistics ==
As of 3 October 2026

Appearances and goals by club, season and competition
Club	Season	League			National cup (Note: Includes FA Cup)		League cup (Note: Includes EFL Cup)		Other		Total	
Club	Season	Division	Apps	Goals	Apps	Goals	Apps	Goals	Apps	Goals	Apps	Goals
Watford	2019–20	Premier League	0	0	1	0	0	0	—		1	0
Watford	2020–21	Championship	5	0	1	0	1	0	—		7	0
Watford	2021–22	Premier League	0	0	0	0	0	0	—		0	0
Watford	2022–23	Championship	7	0	1	0	1	0	—		9	0
Watford	Total		12	0	3	0	2	0	0	0	17	0
Aldershot Town (loan)	2020–21	National League	6	0	0	0	0	0	—		6	0
Ross County (loan)	2021–22	Scottish Premiership	33	7	0	0	0	0	—		33	7
Huddersfield Town (loan)	2022–23	Championship	14	3	0	0	0	0	—		14	3
1. FC Nürnberg	2023–24	2. Bundesliga	17	0	0	0	—		—		17	0
1. FC Nürnberg	2024–25	2. Bundesliga	0	0	0	0	—		—		0	0
1. FC Nürnberg	Total		17	0	0	0	0	0	0	0	17	0
Rotherham United (loan)	2024–25	League One	13	0	1	0	1	0	3 (Note: Appearance(s) in EFL Trophy)	0	18	0
Wigan Athletic	2024–25	League One	11	0	0	0	—		—		11	0
Wigan Athletic	2025–26	League One	32	0	3	0	3	0	1	0	39	0
Wigan Athletic	2026–27	League One	0	0	—		—		—		0	0
Wigan Athletic	Total		43	0	3	0	3	0	1	0	50	0
Swindon Town (loan)	2026–27	League Two	6	1	0	0	1	0	2	0	9	1
Career total			144	11	7	0	7	0	6	0	164	11
