= Felix Lohkemper =

German footballer

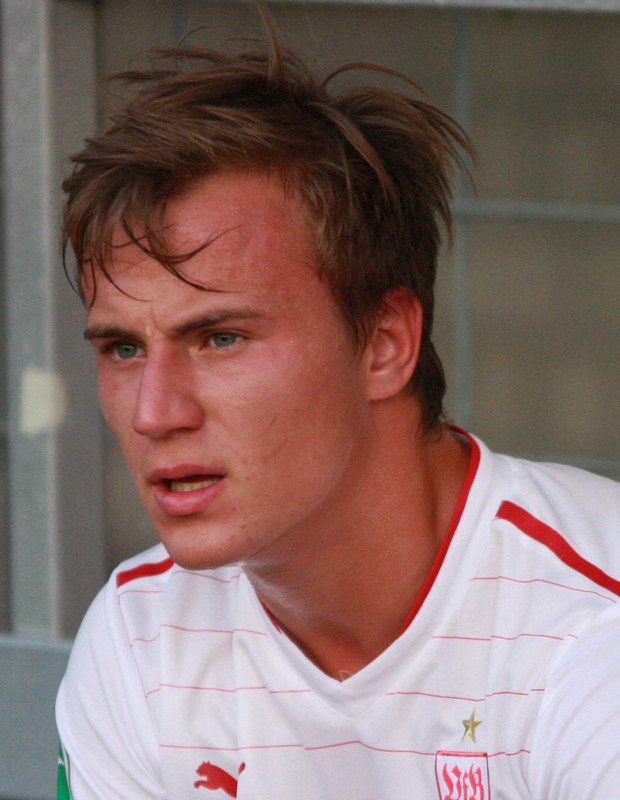
- Lohkemper with VfB Stuttgart II in July 2013

Personal information
- Date of birth: 26 January 1995 (age 31)
- Place of birth: Wetzlar, Germany
- Height: 1.80 m (5 ft 11 in)
- Position: Striker

Team information
- Current team: SV Sandhausen
- Number: 10

Youth career
- SV Kickers Büchig
- 2009–2010: Karlsruher SC
- 2010–2014: VfB Stuttgart

Senior career*
| Years | Team | Apps | (Gls) |
| 2012–2015 | VfB Stuttgart II | 30 | (3) |
| 2015–2016 | 1899 Hoffenheim II | 33 | (17) |
| 2016–2017 | Mainz 05 II | 18 | (4) |
| 2017–2019 | 1. FC Magdeburg | 46 | (11) |
| 2019–2024 | 1. FC Nürnberg | 61 | (9) |
| 2024–2026 | Waldhof Mannheim | 60 | (26) |
| 2026– | SV Sandhausen | 5 | (2) |

International career^{‡}
| 2010 | Germany U16 | 3 | (0) |
| 2011–2012 | Germany U17 | 8 | (2) |
| 2012–2013 | Germany U18 | 6 | (3) |
| 2013–2014 | Germany U19 | 12 | (3) |
| 2014–2015 | Germany U20 | 6 | (0) |
Medal record
| Winner | European U19 Championship | 2014 |
- * Club domestic league appearances and goals as of 24 September 2026 ‡ National team caps and goals as of 1 July 2017

Felix Lohkemper (born 26 January 1995) is a German professional footballer who plays as a forward for Regionalliga Südwest club SV Sandhausen.

== Club career ==
On 24 July 2024, Lohkemper signed with 3. Liga club Waldhof Mannheim.
