= Taylan Duman =

German footballer

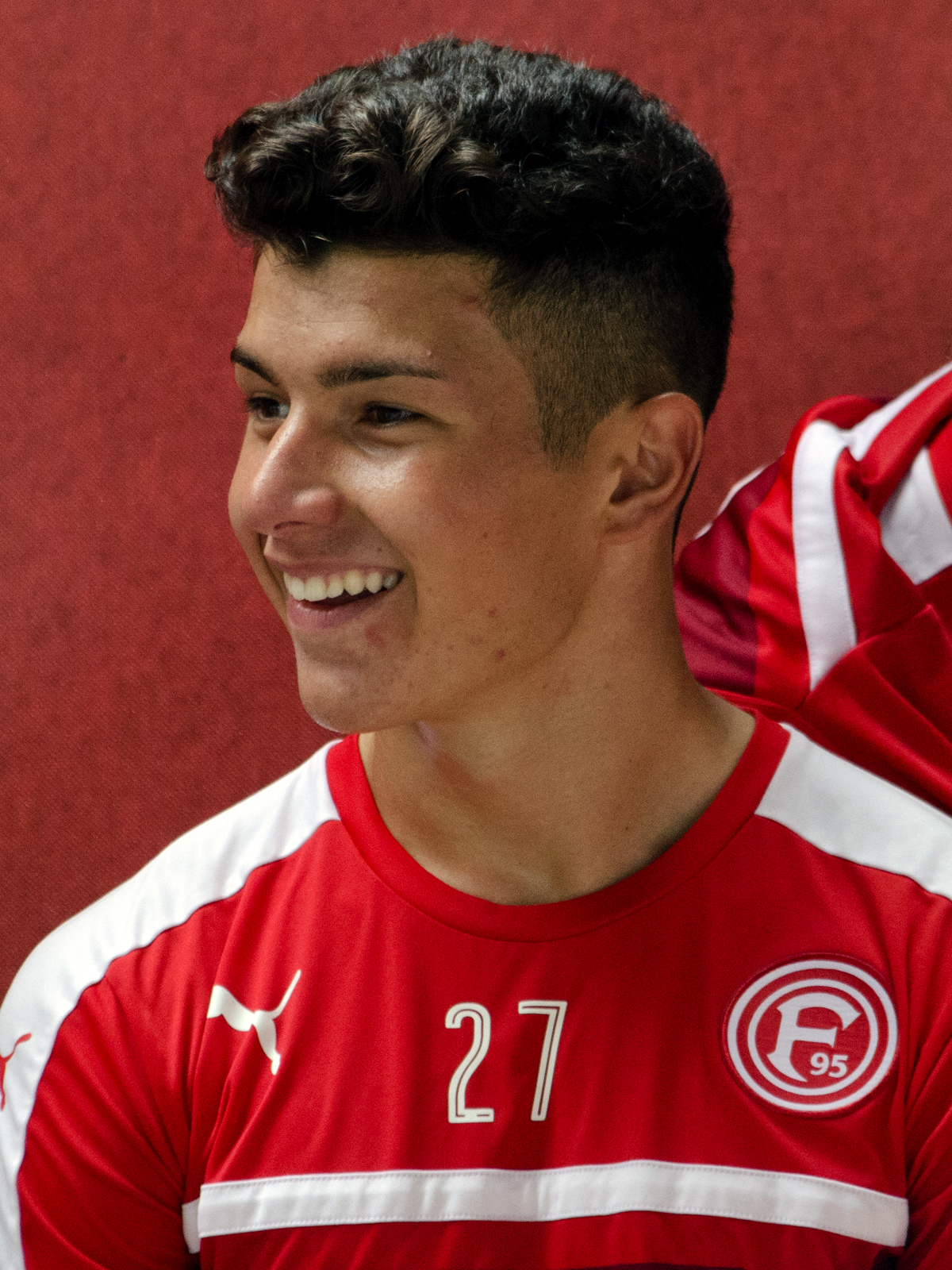
- Duman with Fortuna Düsseldorf in 2016

Personal information
- Date of birth: 30 July 1997 (age 29)
- Place of birth: Moers, Germany
- Height: 1.77 m (5 ft 10 in)
- Position: Midfielder

Team information
- Current team: Viktoria Köln
- Number: 8

Youth career
- 2006–2012: MSV Duisburg
- 2012–2016: Fortuna Düsseldorf

Senior career*
Years	Team	Apps	(Gls)
2016–2019	Fortuna Düsseldorf II	106	(15)
2016	Fortuna Düsseldorf	1	(0)
2019–2021	Borussia Dortmund II	54	(19)
2021–2025	1. FC Nürnberg	69	(4)
2025	SV Sandhausen	9	(1)
2026–	Viktoria Köln	8	(1)
- * Club domestic league appearances and goals as of 24 May 2026

Taylan Duman (born 30 July 1997) is a German professional footballer who plays as a midfielder for 3. Liga club Viktoria Köln.

== Career ==
On 24 January 2025, Duman signed with SV Sandhausen in 3. Liga.

== Personal life ==
Born in Germany, Duman is of Turkish descent.
