= Jermain Nischalke =

German footballer (born 2003)

Personal information
- Date of birth: 26 March 2003 (age 23)
- Place of birth: Berlin, Germany
- Height: 1.92 m (6 ft 4 in)
- Position: Forward

Team information
- Current team: Würzburger Kickers
- Number: 9

Youth career
- Berliner SC
- Hertha Zehlendorf
- Union Berlin
- 2020: Dynamo Dresden
- 2020–2021: Chemnitzer FC

Senior career*
Years	Team	Apps	(Gls)
2021	Chemnitzer FC	3	(1)
2022	1. FC Magdeburg	0	(0)
2022–2024	1. FC Nürnberg II	30	(18)
2023–2024	1. FC Nürnberg	3	(0)
2023–2024	→ Borussia Dortmund II (loan)	12	(0)
2024–2025	FC 08 Homburg	14	(1)
2024–2025	FC 08 Homburg II	5	(4)
2025	SpVgg Bayreuth	9	(3)
2025–	Würzburger Kickers	30	(15)
- * Club domestic league appearances and goals as of 28 June 2026

Jermain Nischalke (born 26 March 2003) is a German professional footballer who plays as a forward for 3. Liga club Würzburger Kickers.

== Club career ==
Born in Germany, Nischalke progressed through the academies of professional sides Berliner SC, Hertha Zehlendorf, Union Berlin and Dynamo Dresden before joining Chemnitzer FC in 2020. He made his debut for Chemnitzer the following year, scoring his first goal for the club in a 3–1 Regionalliga Nordost win over Lichtenberg.

In 2022, he moved to 1. FC Nürnberg, having passed through 1. FC Magdeburg without playing for the senior squad. He was promoted to the Nürnberg first team following his exploits for the reserve team, for whom he scored 9 goals and notched 5 assists in 18 appearances. He signed his first professional contract with the club in December 2022.

On 3 August 2023, Nischalke joined Borussia Dortmund II on a season-long loan deal.

On 22 June 2024, Nischalke signed a one-year deal with FC 08 Homburg in Regionalliga.

== International career ==
Despite being born in Germany, Nischalke is eligible to represent Angola at international level. He was called up to the Angolan senior squad in November 2022, and despite reportedly initially responding positively, he later rejected the call up, giving no reason.

== Career statistics ==
=== Club ===
As of 4 February 2023.

Appearances and goals by club, season and competition
Club	Season	League			Cup		Other		Total	
Club	Season	Division	Apps	Goals	Apps	Goals	Apps	Goals	Apps	Goals
Chemnitzer FC	2021–22	Regionalliga Nordost	3	1	0	0	0	0	3	1
1. FC Magdeburg	2021–22	3. Liga	0	0	0	0	0	0	0	0
1. FC Nürnberg II	2022–23	Regionalliga Bayern	19	9	–		0	0	19	9
1. FC Nürnberg	2022–23	2. Bundesliga	2	0	0	0	0	0	2	0
Career total			24	10	0	0	0	0	24	10
