= Lukas Schleimer =

German footballer

Personal information
- Date of birth: 9 December 1999 (age 26)
- Place of birth: Trier, Germany
- Height: 1.84 m (6 ft 1/2 in)
- Position: Midfielder

Team information
- Current team: SV Wehen Wiesbaden
- Number: 7

Youth career
- –2017: Mosella Schweich
- 2017–2018: 1. FC Nürnberg

Senior career*
Years	Team	Apps	(Gls)
2018–2022	1. FC Nürnberg II	68	(20)
2020–2021	→ 1. FC Saarbrücken (loan)	13	(0)
2021–2025	1. FC Nürnberg	94	(13)
2025–	SV Wehen Wiesbaden	37	(5)
- * Club domestic league appearances and goals as of 29 May 2026

Lukas Schleimer (born 9 December 1999) is a German professional footballer who plays as a midfielder for 3. Liga club SV Wehen Wiesbaden.

== Career ==
Schleimer played youth football with Mosella Schweich before joining 1. FC Nürnberg's under-19 team in 2017. He made his debut for 1. FC Nürnberg II in 2018, before signing his first professional contract with the club in June 2020, lasting until summer 2022.

On 5 October 2020, he joined 1. FC Saarbrücken on a season-long loan. He made his debut for the club on 18 October 2020, coming on as a substitute, before assisting both of Saarbrücken's goals in a 2–1 victory over SpVgg Unterhaching in the 3. Liga. He made 13 appearances whilst on loan at Saarbrücken.

Schleimer made his debut for Nürnberg's first-team on 17 September 2021, and provided the assist for the club's only goal of a 1–0 win over Hansa Rostock.

On 10 July 2025, Schleimer signed a three-season contract with SV Wehen Wiesbaden.
