= Tim Handwerker =

German footballer

Personal information
- Full name: Tim-Henry Handwerker
- Date of birth: 19 May 1998 (age 28)
- Place of birth: Bergisch Gladbach, Germany
- Height: 1.82 m (6 ft 0 in)
- Position: Left-back

Team information
- Current team: Arminia Bielefeld
- Number: 29

Youth career
- –2007: Bergisch Gladbach
- 2007–2017: Bayer Leverkusen

Senior career*
Years	Team	Apps	(Gls)
2017	1. FC Köln II	15	(1)
2017–2019	1. FC Köln	11	(0)
2018–2019	→ Groningen (loan)	31	(0)
2019–2025	1. FC Nürnberg	115	(5)
2023–2025	1. FC Nürnberg II	1	(0)
2024	→ Utrecht (loan)	2	(0)
2025	SSV Jahn Regensburg	15	(0)
2025–	Arminia Bielefeld	23	(4)

International career^{‡}
2016–2017	Germany U19	2	(0)
2019–2020	Germany U21	7	(0)
- * Club domestic league appearances and goals as of 18 May 2026 ‡ National team caps and goals as of 12 November 2020

Tim-Henry Handwerker (born 19 May 1998) is a German professional footballer who plays as a left-back for 2. Bundesliga club Arminia Bielefeld.

== Career ==
Handwerker joined 1. FC Nürnberg in July 2019 from 1. FC Köln, having spent a season on loan at FC Groningen.

In January 2024, Handwerker joined Utrecht on loan for the remainder of the season, the deal including an option for the Eredivisie club to buy.

In January 2025, he moved to SSV Jahn Regensburg.
