= 2026–27 1. FC Nürnberg season =

1. FC Nürnberg
2026–27 season
- Manager: Miroslav Klose
- Stadium: Max-Morlock-Stadion
- 2. Bundesliga: 2nd
- DFB-Pokal: First round
- Top goalscorer: League: Mohamed Ali Zoma (5); All: Mohamed Ali Zoma (5)

The 2026–27 season is the 127th season in the history of 1. Fussball-Club Nürnberg and their eighth consecutive season in the 2. Bundesliga. The club will also compete in the DFB-Pokal.

== Players ==
=== Current squad ===
As of 1 November 2026

Note: Flags indicate national team as defined under FIFA eligibility rules; some limited exceptions apply. Players may hold more than one non-FIFA nationality.

No.	Pos.	Nation	Player
1	GK	GER	Jan Reichert (captain)
4	DF	GRE	Alexis Kalogeropoulos
5	DF	ARM	Styopa Mkrtchyan
6	MF	FIN	Adam Markhiev
7	FW	FRA	Rayan Ghrieb
8	MF	ESP	Javi Fernández (on loan from Bayern Munich)
9	FW	NOR	Sigurd Haugen
10	MF	GER	Julian Justvan
11	FW	DEN	William Bøving (on loan from Mainz 05)
13	GK	POL	Robin Lisewski
14	DF	ITA	Andrea Ceresoli
15	DF	SEN	Mikayil Faye (on loan from Rennes)
16	MF	GER	Marko Soldić
18	MF	GER	Rafael Lubach
19	FW	GER	Piet Scobel

No.	Pos.	Nation	Player
20	DF	GER	Fynn Otto
21	DF	GRE	Giannis Masouras
22	MF	GER	Finn Ole Becker
23	FW	ITA	Mohamed Alì Zoma
26	GK	GER	Christian Mathenia
28	FW	SYR	Can Moustfa
32	DF	GER	Tim Janisch
35	MF	GER	Marc Kornwachs Barjuan
36	DF	CRO	Kristian Mandić
39	FW	GER	Adriano Grimaldi
41	DF	GER	Eric Porstner
43	DF	GER	Tobias Heß
44	DF	PLE	Khalid Abu El Haija
46	GK	GER	Nicolas Ortegel
—	MF	GER	Winners Osawe

== Transfers ==
=== In ===
Pos.	Player	Transferred from	Fee	Date	Source
MF	(Spain) Javier Fernández	(Germany) Bayern Munich	Loan extended	13 June 2026	
DF	(Germany) Kristian Mandić	Promoted from 1. FC Nürnberg II		1 July 2026	
DF	(Germany) Tobias Heß	Promoted from 1. FC Nürnberg II		1 July 2026	
FW	(France) Rayan Ghrieb	(Germany) 1. FC Magdeburg	€600,000	1 July 2026	
FW	(Norway) Sigurd Haugen	(Germany) 1860 Munich	Free	1 July 2026	
DF	(Greece) Alexios Kalogeropoulos	(Greece) Olympiacos	Free	1 July 2026	
DF	(Greece) Giannis Masouras	(Cyprus) Omonoia	Free	1 July 2026	
MF	(Syria) Can Moustfa	(Germany) Energie Cottbus	€300,000	1 July 2026	
DF	(Germany) Fynn Otto	(Germany) SC Verl	Free	1 July 2026	
MF	(Germany) Xaver Kiefersauer	(Germany) 1860 Munich	€75,000	16 July 2026	
DF	(Senegal) Mikayil Faye	(France) Stade Rennais	Loan (€200,000)	23 July 2026	
DF	(Italy) Andrea Ceresoli	(Italy) Atalanta U23	€500,000	4 August 2026	
FW	(Denmark) William Bøving	(Germany) Mainz 05	Loan	28 August 2026	

=== Out ===
Pos.	Player	Transferred to	Fee	Date	Source
DF	(Togo) Henri Koudossou	(Germany) FC Augsburg	Loan return	30 June 2026	
DF	(Turkey) Berkay Yılmaz	(Germany) SC Freiburg	Loan return	30 June 2026	
FW	(Martinique) Mickaël Biron	(Turkey) Batman Petrolspor	Loan	1 July 2026	
MF	(Brazil) Danilo Soares	Austria Lustenau	Free	1 July 2026	
MF	(Germany) Florian Flick	(Germany) Eintracht Braunschweig	€250,000 (from loan to definitive purchase)	1 July 2026	
DF	(Germany) Jannik Hofmann	(Germany) Rot-Weiss Essen	€150,000 (from loan to definitive purchase)	1 July 2026	
DF	(Germany) Nick Seidel	(Germany) SC Verl	€100,000	1 July 2026	
MF	(Germany) Tom Baack	(Germany) SC Paderborn	Free	1 July 2026	
FW	(Germany) Dustin Forkel	(Germany) Rot-Weiß Erfurt	Free	1 July 2026	
MF	(Peru) Fabio Gruber	(Germany) Mainz 05	€3,500,000	1 July 2026	
DF	(Georgia (country)) Luka Lochoshvili	(Germany) 1. FC Köln	€4,900,000	2 July 2026	
GK	(Slovakia) Michal Kukučka	(Czech Republic) Jablonec	Loan	10 July 2026	
FW	(Germany) Semir Telalović	(Germany) Rot-Weiss Essen	Loan	11 July 2026	
MF	(Germany) Xaver Kiefersauer	(Germany) Würzburger Kickers	Loan	17 July 2026	
FW	(Republic of the Congo) Noah Maboulou	(Germany) Viktoria Köln	Loan (€50,000)	22 July 2026	
FW	(Croatia) Tino Kusanović	(Austria) SV Ried	Loan	5 August 2026	
MF	(Morocco) Ayoub Chaikhoun	(Germany) Wehen Wiesbaden	Loan	13 August 2026	
MF	(Germany) Justin von der Hitz	(Germany) Alemannia Aachen	Loan	29 August 2026	

== Pre-season and friendlies ==
8 July 2026 Friendly	TSV Kornburg (Germany)	0–10	(Germany) 1. FC Nürnberg
19:00

11 July 2026 Friendly	SpVgg Ansbach (Germany)	1–5	(Germany) 1. FC Nürnberg
18:00

18 July 2026 Friendly	1. FC Nürnberg (Germany)	3–2	(Germany) SV Waldhof Mannheim
16:00

25 July 2026 Friendly	Palermo (Italy)	2–2	(Germany) 1. FC Nürnberg
16:30	60'; 76'		Zoma 16', 48' (pen.)

1 August 2026 Friendly	1. FC Nürnberg (Germany)	2–1	(Spain) Real Oviedo
13:00

== Competitions ==
=== Overall record ===
Competition	First match	Last match	Starting round	Record							
Competition	First match	Last match	Starting round	Pld	W	D	L	GF	GA	GD	Win %
2. Bundesliga	9 August 2026		Matchday 1	3	3	0	0	11	3	+8	100.00
DFB-Pokal	22 August 2026			0	0	0	0	0	0	+0	—
Total				3	3	0	0	11	3	+8	100.00

Last updated: 29 August 2026
Source: Competitions

=== 2. Bundesliga ===
Pos	Team	Pld	W	D	L	GF	GA	GD	Pts	Promotion, qualification or relegation
1	Hertha BSC	11	10	1	0	25	9	+16	31	Promotion to Bundesliga
2	1. FC Nürnberg	11	7	3	1	26	13	+13	24	Promotion to Bundesliga
3	1. FC Kaiserslautern	11	6	3	2	10	7	+3	21	Qualification for promotion play-offs
4	1. FC Magdeburg	11	6	2	3	25	14	+11	20	
5	VfL Wolfsburg	11	5	4	2	26	16	+10	19	

Updated to match(es) played on 8 November 2026. Source: Bundesliga
Rules for classification: 1) Points; 2) Goal difference; 3) Goals scored; 4) Head-to-head results; 5) Head-to-head away goals scored; 6) Away goals scored; 7) Play-off.
(Rules 4–6 only apply after home and away matches have been played between the tied teams.)

==== Results by round ====
Round	1	2	3	4
Ground	H	A	H	A
Result	W	W	W	D
Position	2	1	1	

Updated to match(es) played on 29 August 2026. Source:
A = Away; H = Home; W = Win; D = Draw; L = Loss

==== Matches ====
9 August 2026 1	1. FC Nürnberg	3–0	Dynamo Dresden	Nuremberg
13:30	Zoma 9', 45+6', 75', (penalty missed) 75'	Report	Keller (yellow card) 74'; Straudi (yellow card) 74'	Stadium: Max-Morlock-Stadion; Attendance: 41,622; Referee: Jarno Wienefeld

15 August 2026 2	Greuther Fürth	2–4	Nürnberg	Fürth
13:00	Klaus 22' (pen.), 41'; Keller (yellow card) 89'	Report	Scobel 26', 74'; Justvan 45+3'; Fernández (yellow card) 45+6'; Porstner (yellow card) 61'; Ghrieb (yellow card) 77'	Stadium: Sportpark Ronhof Thomas Sommer; Attendance: 16,126; Referee: Tom Bauer

29 August 2026 3	1. FC Nürnberg	4–1	Arminia Bielefeld	Nuremberg
20:30	Zoma 11', (yellow card) 60'; Janisch 22'; Markhiyev 38', 67'	Report	Wörl 76'	Stadium: Max-Morlock-Stadion; Attendance: 36,269; Referee: Patrick Schwengers

5 September 2026 4	Holstein Kiel	2–2	1. FC Nürnberg	Kiel
13:00	Kaprálik (yellow card) 12', (goal) 50'; Zec (yellow card) 16'; Balzi (yellow card) 36'; Harres 45+1'; Parduzi (yellow card) 65'	Report	Porstner (yellow card) 34'; Markhiyev 41'; Scobel 56'; Lubach (yellow card) 77'; Zoma (yellow card) 83'	Stadium: Holstein-Stadion; Referee: Patrick Schwengers

11 September 2026 5	1. FC Nürnberg	2–1	Hannover 96	Nuremberg
18:30 CEST (UTC+2)	Justvan 5'; Becker (yellow card) 23'; Scobel (yellow card) 32'; Zoma 65'; Janisch (yellow card) 90+3'	Report	Gindorf 8' (pen.); Neubauer (yellow card) 76'	Stadium: Max-Morlock-Stadion; Attendance: 41,202; Referee: Florian Lechner

=== DFB-Pokal ===
22 August 2026 First round	Viktoria Köln	1–1 (4–5 p)	1. FC Nürnberg	Cologne
15:30	Sponsel 90+6'		Scobel 56'	Referee: Eric-Dominic Weisbach
	Penalties
	Sachse (penalty scored); Prokopenko (penalty scored); Fallamann (penalty missed); Eisenhuth (penalty scored); Swider (penalty missed); Maboulou (penalty scored); Jahn (penalty missed)		(penalty scored) Justvan; (penalty scored) Mandic; (penalty scored) Markhiyev; (penalty missed) Masouras; (penalty missed) Fernández; (penalty scored) Otto; (penalty scored) Moustfa
