= 2023–24 UC AlbinoLeffe season =

UC AlbinoLeffe
2023–24 season
- Manager: Giovanni Lopez
- Stadium: AlbinoLeffe Stadium
- Serie C Group A: 9th
- Coppa Italia Serie C: First round

The 2023–24 season is UC AlbinoLeffe's 26th season in existence and fifth consecutive season in the Serie C. They are also competing in the Coppa Italia Serie C.

== Players ==
=== First-team squad ===
As of 1 September 2023

Note: Flags indicate national team as defined under FIFA eligibility rules; some limited exceptions apply. Players may hold more than one non-FIFA nationality.

No.	Pos.	Nation	Player
1	GK	ITA	Leandro Pratelli
2	DF	ITA	Jacopo Gelli
3	MF	ITA	Matteo Zanini
4	MF	ITA	Francesco Giorno
5	DF	ITA	Stefano Marchetti
6	MF	ITA	Issa Doumbia
7	MF	FRA	Gaël Genevier (Vice-captain)
8	MF	ITA	Michael Brentan
9	FW	ITA	Cristian Carletti
10	MF	ITA	Marco Piccoli
11	FW	CIV	Mohamed Alì Zoma
13	DF	ITA	Luca Milesi
16	DF	ROU	Mihai Gușu
17	MF	ITA	Duccio Toccafondi

No.	Pos.	Nation	Player
19	FW	ITA	Mattia Angeloni
20	MF	ITA	Carmelo Muzio
21	MF	ITA	Amedeo Poletti
22	GK	ITA	Christian Marietta
23	DF	ITA	Mirko Saltarelli
27	MF	ITA	Davide Munari
33	DF	ITA	Diego Borghini
42	MF	ITA	Andrea Allieri
44	DF	ITA	Riccardo Gatti
60	FW	ITA	Andrea Arrighini
90	FW	ALB	Rrok Toma
91	FW	ITA	Salvatore Longo
95	DF	ITA	Mattia Agostinelli
—	GK	ITA	Leonardo Moleri

==== Out on loan ====
Note: Flags indicate national team as defined under FIFA eligibility rules; some limited exceptions apply. Players may hold more than one non-FIFA nationality.

No.	Pos.	Nation	Player
—	GK	ITA	Lorenzo Facchetti (at Albenga until 30 June 2024)

== Transfers ==
=== In ===
Pos.	Player	Transferred from	Fee	Date	Source

=== Out ===
Pos.	Player	Transferred to	Fee	Date	Source

== Pre-season and friendlies ==
Win Draw Loss Fixtures

26 July 2023 Friendly	Reggiana (Italy)	4–1	(Italy) AlbinoLeffe
17:20 CEST (UTC+2)

30 July 2023 Friendly	Pro Sesto (Italy)	0–3	(Italy) AlbinoLeffe
17:00 CEST (UTC+2)

6 August 2023 Friendly	Ponte San Pietro (Italy)	1–2	(Italy) AlbinoLeffe
17:00 CEST (UTC+2)

9 August 2023 Friendly	Pro Vercelli (Italy)	1–3	(Italy) AlbinoLeffe
17:30 CEST (UTC+2)

19 August 2023 Friendly	AlbinoLeffe (Italy)	2–0	(Italy) Giana Erminio
17:00 CEST (UTC+2)

20 August 2023 Friendly	Aurora Pro Patria (Italy)	0–0	(Italy) AlbinoLeffe
18:00 CEST (UTC+2)

== Competitions ==
=== Overall record ===
Competition	First match	Last match	Starting round	Record							
Competition	First match	Last match	Starting round	Pld	W	D	L	GF	GA	GD	Win %
Serie C	4 September 2023	28 April 2024	Matchday 1	19	7	4	8	18	18	+0	36.84
Coppa Italia Serie C	5 October 2023		First round	1	0	0	1	0	2	−2	0.00
Total				20	7	4	9	18	20	−2	35.00

Last updated: 23 December 2023
Source: Soccerway

=== Serie C ===
==== League table ====
Pos	Team	Pld	W	D	L	GF	GA	GD	Pts
11	Virtus Verona	38	12	11	15	35	43	−8	47
12	Pro Patria	38	12	10	16	37	51	−14	46
13	AlbinoLeffe	38	10	15	13	34	37	−3	45 (Note: Albinoleffe are ahead of Renate on head-to-head points: Albinoleffe 8, Pergolettese 5, Renate 2.)
14	Pergolettese	38	13	6	19	44	50	−6	45
15	Renate	38	11	12	15	35	46	−11	45

Updated to match(es) played on 28 April 2024. Source: Lega Pro, Soccerway (in English)
Rules for classification: 1) Points; 2) Head-to-head points; 3) Head-to-head goal difference; 4) Goal difference; 5) Goals scored; 6) Lower goals against; 7) Wins; 8) Lower losses; 9) Away wins; 10) Lower home losses.
(Note: Head-to-head record is used only after all the matches between the teams in question have been played)

==== Results summary ====
Overall								Home						Away					
Pld	W	D	L	GF	GA	GD	Pts	W	D	L	GF	GA	GD	W	D	L	GF	GA	GD
38	10	15	13	34	37	−3	45	5	7	7	15	16	−1	5	8	6	19	21	−2

Source: Worldfootball

==== Results by round ====
Round	1	2	3	4	5	6	7	8	9	10	11	12	13	14	15	16	17	18	19	20
Ground	A	H	A	H	A	H	A	H	H	A	H	A	H	A	A	H	A	H	A	H
Result	D	L	L	W	L	L	D	W	D	D	W	W	L	L	W	L	W	W	L	
Position	10	16	17	11	15	17	18	15	16	15	13	9	10	14	12	14				

Updated to match(es) played on 23 December 2023. Source: Worldfootball
A = Away; H = Home; W = Win; D = Draw; L = Loss

==== Matches ====
The league fixtures were unveiled on 7 August 2023.

4 September 2023 1	Vicenza	0–0	AlbinoLeffe	Vicenza
20:45 CEST (UTC+2)		Report		Stadium: Stadio Romeo Menti; Referee: Andrea Zanotti

10 September 2023 2	AlbinoLeffe	1–2	Triestina	Zanica
18:30 CEST (UTC+2)	Gușu 63'	Report	Lescano 65', 75'	Stadium: AlbinoLeffe Stadium; Referee: Edoardo Gianquinto

17 September 2023 3	Fiorenzuola	2–1	AlbinoLeffe	Fiorenzuola d'Arda
18:30 CEST (UTC+2)	Ceravolo 6'; Gonzi 70'		Zoma 30'	Stadium: Stadio Comunale; Referee: Mauro Gangi

20 September 2023 4	AlbinoLeffe	3–1	Pro Patria	Zanica
18:30 CEST (UTC+2)	Zoma 8'; Milesi 22'; Zanini 61'		Castelli 90'	Stadium: AlbinoLeffe Stadium; Attendance: 526; Referee: Silvia Gasperotti

24 September 2023 5	Mantova	3–1	AlbinoLeffe	Mantua
18:30 CEST (UTC+2)	Brignani 12', 87'; Galuppini 66'		Zanini 15'	Stadium: Stadio Danilo Martelli; Referee: Alessandro Silvestri

30 September 2023 6	AlbinoLeffe	0–1	Legnago Salus	Zanica
16:15 CEST (UTC+2)			Rocco 26'	Stadium: AlbinoLeffe Stadium; Referee: Filippo Colaninno

7 October 2023 7	Atalanta U23	1–1	AlbinoLeffe	Bergamo
18:30 CEST (UTC+2)	Palestra 70'		Arrighini 78'	Stadium: Gewiss Stadium; Referee: Gioiele Iacobellis

13 October 2023 8	AlbinoLeffe	1–0	Virtus Verona	Zanica
20:45 CEST (UTC+2)	Piccoli 64'			Stadium: AlbinoLeffe Stadium; Referee: Giuseppe Rispoli

21 October 2023 9	AlbinoLeffe	0–0	Alessandria	Zanica
20:45 CEST (UTC+2)	Longo (red card) 81'		Gazoul (yellow card) 19' (yellow-red card) 40'	Stadium: AlbinoLeffe Stadium; Referee: Alfredo Iannello

24 October 2023 10	Giana Erminio	0–0	AlbinoLeffe	Gorgonzola
18:30 CEST (UTC+2)				Stadium: Stadio Città di Gorgonzola; Referee: Gabriele Restaldo

28 October 2023 11	AlbinoLeffe	1–0	Arzignano Valchiampo	Zanica
18:30 CEST (UTC+2)	Marchetti 18'			Stadium: AlbinoLeffe Stadium; Referee: Enrico Gemelli

4 November 2023 12	Novara	0–3	AlbinoLeffe	Novara
18:30 CET (UTC+1)			Doumbia 2'; Arrighini 6' (pen.); Zoma 90+1' (pen.)	Stadium: Stadio Silvio Piola; Attendance: 2,518; Referee: Alberto Poli

11 November 2023 13	AlbinoLeffe	0–1	Padova	Zanica
20:45 CET (UTC+1)			Villa 34'	Stadium: AlbinoLeffe Stadium; Referee: Giuseppe Vingo

18 November 2023 14	Pro Sesto	2–0	AlbinoLeffe	Sesto San Giovanni
16:15 CET (UTC+1)	Maurizii 24'; Bussaglia 42'; Bruschi (penalty missed) 83'			Stadium: Stadio Ernesto Breda; Referee: Lucio Felice Angelillo

24 November 2023 15	Trento	1–2	AlbinoLeffe	Trento
20:45 CET (UTC+1)	Petrović 76'		Borghini 37'; Muzio 51'	Stadium: Stadio Briamasco; Referee: Simone Gavini

3 December 2023 16	AlbinoLeffe	0–1	Pro Vercelli	Zanica
18:30 CET (UTC+1)			Maggio 56'	Stadium: AlbinoLeffe Stadium; Referee: Fabrizio Pacella

8 December 2023 17	Renate	0–2	AlbinoLeffe	Renate
14:00 CET (UTC+1)			Longo 11'; Zoma 57'	Stadium: Stadio Città di Meda; Referee: Jules Roland Andeng Tona Mbei

16 December 2023 18	AlbinoLeffe	1–0	Pergolettese	Zanica
18:30 CET (UTC+1)	Longo 35'			Stadium: AlbinoLeffe Stadium; Referee: Francesco Burlando

23 December 2023 19	Lumezzane	3–1	AlbinoLeffe	Lumezzane
14:00 CET (UTC+1)	Gerbi 42'; Cannavò (red card) 74'; Pisano 86'; Cali 90+5'		Arrighini (penalty missed) 68', 68'	Stadium: Stadio Tullio Saleri; Referee: Luigi Catanoso

6 January 2024 20	AlbinoLeffe	0–0	Vicenza	Zanica
14:00 CET (UTC+1)				Stadium: AlbinoLeffe Stadium

27 January 2024 23	Aurora Pro Patria	0–0	AlbinoLeffe	Busto Arsizio
16:15 CET (UTC+1)				Stadium: Stadio Carlo Speroni

4 February 2024 24	AlbinoLeffe	2–1	Mantova	Zanica
18:30 CET (UTC+1)	Zoma 54'; Longo 73'		Galuppini 81'	Stadium: AlbinoLeffe Stadium

10 February 2024 25	Legnago Salus	2–1	AlbinoLeffe	Legnago
20:45 CET (UTC+1)				Stadium: Stadio Mario Sandrini

13 February 2024 26	AlbinoLeffe	0–1	Atalanta U23	Zanica
18:30 CET (UTC+1)				Stadium: AlbinoLeffe Stadium

17 February 2024 27	Virtus Verona	1–1	AlbinoLeffe	Verona
16:15 CET (UTC+1)				Stadium: Stadio Gavagnin Nocini

24 February 2024 28	Alessandria	0–1	AlbinoLeffe	Alessandria
18:30 CET (UTC+1)			Gușu 45'	Stadium: Stadio Giuseppe Moccagatta; Referee: Gioele Iacobellis

1 March 2024 29	AlbinoLeffe	0–0	Giana Erminio	Zanica
20:45 CET (UTC+1)				Stadium: AlbinoLeffe Stadium

=== Coppa Italia Serie C ===
5 October 2023 First round	AlbinoLeffe	0–2	Renate	Zanica
16:15 CEST (UTC+2)		Report	Amadio 41'; Procaccio 82'	Stadium: AlbinoLeffe Stadium; Referee: Gabriele Totaro
