= 2025–26 1. FC Nürnberg season =

1. FC Nürnberg
2025–26 season
- Sporting director: Joti Chatzialexiou
- Commercial director: Niels Rossow
- Head coach: Miroslav Klose
- Stadium: Max-Morlock-Stadion
- 2. Bundesliga: 8th
- DFB-Pokal: First round
- Top goalscorer: League: Mohamed Ali Zoma (14); All: Mohamed Ali Zoma (14)
- Highest home attendance: 47,150
- Lowest home attendance: 25,639
- Average home league attendance: 35,099
- Biggest win: 1. FC Nürnberg 5–1 Karlsruher SC; 2. Bundesliga; (13 February 2026)
- Biggest defeat: 1. FC Nürnberg 0–3 Hertha BSC; 2. Bundesliga; (28 September 2025); 1. FC Nürnberg 0–3 1. FC Magdeburg; 2. Bundesliga (29 November 2025)
| Home colours | Away colours | Third colours |

The 2025–26 season was the 124th season in the history of 1. FC Nürnberg and their 13th consecutive campaign in the 2. Bundesliga. The club also took part in the DFB-Pokal, where they were eliminated in the first round by FV Illertissen.

== Players ==
=== First-team squad ===
As of 10 May 2026.

Note: Flags indicate national team as defined under FIFA eligibility rules; some limited exceptions apply. Players may hold more than one non-FIFA nationality.

Note: Flags indicate national team as defined under FIFA eligibility rules; some limited exceptions apply. Players may hold more than one non-FIFA nationality.

| No. | Pos. | Nation | Player |
|---|---|---|---|
| 1 | GK | GER | Jan Reichert |
| 3 | DF | BRA | Danilo Soares |
| 4 | DF | PER | Fabio Gruber |
| 5 | MF | GER | Tom Baack |
| 6 | MF | FIN | Adam Markhiyev |
| 7 | FW | MTQ | Mickaël Biron |
| 8 | DF | GER | Henri Koudossou |
| 10 | MF | GER | Julian Justvan |
| 13 | GK | POL | Robin Lisewski |
| 16 | MF | GER | Marko Soldić |
| 17 | MF | MAR | Ayoub Chaikhoun |
| 18 | MF | GER | Rafael Lubach |
| 19 | MF | POL | Eryk Grzywacz |
| 20 | MF | ESP | Javier Fernández |
| 21 | DF | TUR | Berkay Yılmaz |
| 22 | MF | FRA | Rabby Nzingoula |

| No. | Pos. | Nation | Player |
|---|---|---|---|
| 23 | FW | CIV | Mohamed Ali Zoma |
| 24 | DF | GEO | Luka Lochoshvili |
| 25 | MF | GER | Finn Becker |
| 26 | GK | GER | Christian Mathenia |
| 27 | DF | GER | Justin von der Hitz |
| 28 | DF | GER | Tarek Buchmann |
| 32 | MF | GER | Tim Janisch |
| 33 | FW | GER | Adriano Grimaldi |
| 35 | MF | GER | Simon Joachims |
| 36 | DF | CRO | Kristian Mandic |
| 37 | FW | CGO | Noah Maboulou |
| 39 | FW | GER | Piet Scobel |
| 41 | DF | GER | Eric Porstner |
| 42 | FW | CRO | Tino Kusanović |
| 44 | DF | ARM | Styopa Mkrtchyan |
| 46 | FW | GER | Levin Chiumento |

=== Players out on loan ===
| No. | Pos. | Nation | Player | To | Loan end |
|---|---|---|---|---|---|
| — | GK | (Germany) | Nicolas Ortegel | BFC Dynamo | 30 June 2026 |
| — | GK | (Slovakia) | Michal Kukučka | FC Koper | 30 June 2026 |
| — | DF | (Germany) | Jannik Hofmann | Rot-Weiss Essen | 30 June 2026 |
| — | DF | (Germany) | Nick Seidel | Jahn Regensburg | 30 June 2026 |
| — | MF | (Germany) | Florian Flick | Eintracht Braunschweig | 30 June 2026 |
| — | MF | (Germany) | Dustin Forkel | FC Schweinfurt | 30 June 2026 |
| — | MF | (Germany) | Winners Osawe | FC Schweinfurt | 30 June 2026 |
| — | FW | (Germany) | Semir Telalović | Arminia Bielefeld | 30 June 2026 |
| — | FW | (Ukraine) | Artem Stepanov | FC Utrecht | 30 June 2026 |

== Transfers ==
=== Transfers in ===
| Date | Pos. | Nation | Name | From | Fee |
|---|---|---|---|---|---|
| 12 May 2025 | DF | (Germany) | Justin von der Hitz | Köln | Free |
| 29 May 2025 | MF | (Germany) | Tom Baack | SC Verl | Free |
| 30 May 2025 | FW | (Germany) | Semir Telalović | SSV Ulm 1846 | Undisclosed |
| 3 July 2025 | DF | (Republic of the Congo) | Noah Maboulou | Rennes B | Free |
| 10 July 2025 | FW | (Martinique) | Mickaël Biron | RWD Molenbeek | €810,000 |
| 12 July 2025 | DF | (Georgia (country)) | Luka Lochoshvili | Cremonese | €1,100,000 |
| 14 July 2025 | GK | (Poland) | Robin Lisewski | Borussia Dortmund | Free |
| 14 July 2025 | DF | (Croatia) | Kristian Mandic | Eintracht Frankfurt | Undisclosed |
| 21 August 2025 | FW | (Ivory Coast) | Mohamed Ali Zoma | AlbinoLeffe | Undisclosed |
| 27 August 2025 | MF | (Germany) | Finn Becker | Hoffenheim | €260,000 |
| 1 September 2025 | MF | (Finland) | Adam Markhiyev | Aris Limassol | Undisclosed |
| 1 September 2025 | FW | (Germany) | Adriano Grimaldi | Paderborn | Undisclosed |
| 2 February 2026 | DF | (Armenia) | Styopa Mkrtchyan | Osijek | €810,000 |

=== Transfers out ===
| Date | Pos. | Nation | Name | To | Fee |
|---|---|---|---|---|---|
| 28 May 2025 | FW | (Germany) | Christoph Daferner | Dynamo Dresden | €260,000 |
| 21 June 2025 | DF | (Germany) | Jannes-Kilian Horn | Rapid Wien | Free |
| 25 June 2025 | FW | (Azerbaijan) | Mahir Emreli | 1. FC Kaiserslautern | Free |
| 10 July 2025 | FW | (Germany) | Lukas Schleimer | Wehen Wiesbaden | Free |
| 11 July 2025 | MF | (Morocco) | Ali Loune | RWD Molenbeek | Undisclosed |
| 15 July 2025 | FW | (Germany) | Manuel Wintzheimer | FC Schweinfurt | Undisclosed |
| 18 July 2025 | MF | (Denmark) | Oliver Villadsen | Brøndby IF | €750,000 |
| 1 August 2025 | DF | (Spain) | Iván Márquez | Fortuna Sittard | Undisclosed |
| 29 August 2025 | MF | (Germany) | Caspar Jander | Southampton | €12,000,000 |
| July 2025 | MF | (Germany) | Jens Castrop | Borussia Mönchengladbach | €4,500,000 |
| 4 December 2025 | MF | (Germany) | Florian Flick | Eintracht Braunschweig | Undisclosed |
| 23 January 2026 | DF | (Czech Republic) | Ondřej Karafiát | Free Agent | Free |
| 30 January 2026 | DF | (Germany) | Robin Knoche | Arminia Bielefeld | Free |

== Pre-season and friendlies ==
=== Pre-season ===
| 26 July 2025 Friendly | 1. FC Nürnberg | 0–2 | Borussia Mönchengladbach | Nürnberg |
| 14:00 CEST (UTC+2) | | Report | Ullrich 31'; Friedrich 76' | Stadium: Max-Morlock-Stadion |

== Competitions ==
=== Overall record ===
| Competition | First match | Last match | Starting round | Final position | Record | | | | | | | |
| Competition | First match | Last match | Starting round | Final position | Pld | W | D | L | GF | GA | GD | Win % |
|---|---|---|---|---|---|---|---|---|---|---|---|---|
| 2. Bundesliga | 2 August 2025 | 17 May 2026 | Matchday 1 | TBD | 33 | 12 | 9 | 12 | 44 | 42 | +2 | 36.36 |
| DFB-Pokal | 16 August 2025 | 16 August 2025 | First round | First round | 1 | 0 | 0 | 1 | 3 | 3 | +0 | 0.00 |
| Total | | | | | 34 | 12 | 9 | 13 | 47 | 45 | +2 | 35.29 |

Source: 1. FC Nürnberg

=== 2. Bundesliga ===
==== League table ====
| Pos | Team | Pld | W | D | L | GF | GA | GD | Pts |
|---|---|---|---|---|---|---|---|---|---|
| 6 | 1. FC Kaiserslautern | 34 | 16 | 4 | 14 | 52 | 47 | +5 | 52 |
| 7 | Hertha BSC | 34 | 14 | 9 | 11 | 47 | 44 | +3 | 51 |
| 8 | 1. FC Nürnberg | 34 | 12 | 10 | 12 | 47 | 45 | +2 | 46 |
| 9 | VfL Bochum | 34 | 11 | 11 | 12 | 49 | 47 | +2 | 44 |
| 10 | Karlsruher SC | 34 | 12 | 8 | 14 | 53 | 64 | −11 | 44 |

Source: Bundesliga
Rules for classification: 1) Points; 2) Goal difference; 3) Goals scored; 4) Head-to-head results; 5) Head-to-head away goals scored; 6) Away goals scored; 7) Play-off.
(Rules 4–6 only apply after home and away matches have been played between the tied teams.)

(Nürnberg are mid-table after 26 matches.)

==== Results summary ====
| Overall | | | | | | | | Home | | | | | | Away | | | | | |
| Pld | W | D | L | GF | GA | GD | Pts | W | D | L | GF | GA | GD | W | D | L | GF | GA | GD |
|---|---|---|---|---|---|---|---|---|---|---|---|---|---|---|---|---|---|---|---|
| 33 | 12 | 9 | 12 | 44 | 42 | +2 | 45 | 9 | 4 | 4 | 27 | 17 | +10 | 3 | 5 | 8 | 17 | 25 | −8 |

Last updated: 10 May 2026.
Source: Bundesliga

==== Results by round ====
| Round | 1 | 2 | 3 | 4 | 5 | 6 | 7 | 8 | 9 | 10 | 11 | 12 | 13 | 14 | 15 | 16 | 17 | 18 | 19 | 20 | 21 | 22 | 23 | 24 | 25 | 26 | 27 | 28 | 29 | 30 | 31 | 32 | 33 | 34 |
|---|---|---|---|---|---|---|---|---|---|---|---|---|---|---|---|---|---|---|---|---|---|---|---|---|---|---|---|---|---|---|---|---|---|---|
| Ground | A | H | A | H | A | H | H | A | H | A | H | A | H | A | H | A | H | H | A | H | A | H | A | A | H | A | H | A | H | A | H | A | H | A |
| Result | L | L | L | D | L | W | L | W | D | D | W | W | W | L | D | L | W | W | L | D | L | W | D | L | L | W | W | D | L | D | W | D | W | – |
| Position | 12 | 14 | 18 | 17 | 18 | 16 | 15 | 13 | 13 | 12 | 11 | 10 | 9 | 11 | 10 | 11 | 8 | 8 | 9 | 9 | 10 | 10 | 8 | 8 | 9 | 10 | 9 | 9 | 9 | 9 | 8 | 8 | 8 | – |
| Points | 0 | 0 | 0 | 1 | 1 | 4 | 4 | 7 | 8 | 9 | 12 | 15 | 18 | 18 | 19 | 19 | 22 | 25 | 25 | 26 | 26 | 29 | 30 | 30 | 30 | 33 | 36 | 37 | 37 | 38 | 41 | 42 | 45 | – |

Updated to match(es) played on 10 May 2026. Source: 1. FC Nürnberg – Gesamttabelle
A = Away; H = Home; W = Win; D = Draw; L = Loss

==== Matches ====
| 2 August 2025 Matchday 1 | SV 07 Elversberg | 1–0 | 1. FC Nürnberg | Spiesen-Elversberg |
| 13:00 CEST (UTC+2) | Rohr (yellow card) 89' (goal) 90'; Gyamerah (yellow card) 90+5' | Report | Soares (yellow card) 19'; Biron (yellow card) 28'; Gruber (yellow card) 85' | Stadium: Waldstadion an der Kaiserlinde; Attendance: 9,307; Referee: Eric-Dominic Weisbach |

| 8 August 2025 Matchday 2 | 1. FC Nürnberg | 0–1 | SV Darmstadt 98 | Nürnberg |
| 18:30 CEST (UTC+2) | Janisch (yellow card) 53'; Lochoshvili (yellow card) 61' | Report | Marseiler (yellow card) 39'; Corredor (yellow card) 67' (goal) 90+5' | Stadium: Max-Morlock-Stadion; Attendance: 32,455; Referee: Florian Lechner |

| 22 August 2025 Matchday 3 | Preußen Münster | 2–1 | 1. FC Nürnberg | Münster |
| 18:30 CEST (UTC+2) | Batista Meier 32'; Schulz 43' (yellow card) 45'; Jaeckel (yellow card) 90+5' | Report | Gruber (yellow card) 12'; Koudossou (yellow card) 20'; Jander (yellow card) 47'; Yılmaz (yellow card) 73'; Lubach 74'; Reichert (yellow card) 87'; Lochoshvili (yellow card) 90+5' | Stadium: Preußenstadion; Attendance: 10,635 |

| 29 August 2025 Matchday 4 | 1. FC Nürnberg | 0–0 | SC Paderborn 07 | Nürnberg |
| 18:30 CEST (UTC+2) | Telalović (yellow card) 29'; Gruber (yellow card) 70'; Justvan (yellow card) 72' | Report | Götze (yellow card) 43'; Engelns (yellow card) 45+4'; Hoffmeier (yellow card) 60'; Michel (yellow card) 84' | Stadium: Max-Morlock-Stadion; Attendance: 30,716 |

| 13 September 2025 Matchday 5 | Karlsruher SC | 2–1 | 1. FC Nürnberg | Karlsruhe |
| 13:00 CEST (UTC+2) | Schleusener 44'; Wanitzek 75'; Burnić (yellow card) 83'; Bernat (yellow card) 90+4' | Report | Koudossou 45+4'; Yılmaz (yellow card) 83' | Stadium: Wildparkstadion; Attendance: 33,180; Referee: Tom Bauer |

| 20 September 2025 Matchday 6 | 1. FC Nürnberg | 2–1 | VfL Bochum | Nürnberg |
| 20:30 CEST (UTC+2) | Justvan 68'; Janisch (yellow card) 85'; Grimaldi 90+2' | Report | Mašović (yellow card) 34'; Vogt (yellow card) 37'; Lenz (yellow card) 45+4'; Strompf (yellow card) 61'; Loosli (yellow card) 76'; Sissoko 86' (pen.) | Stadium: Max-Morlock-Stadion; Attendance: 33,398; Referee: Lars Erbst |

| 28 September 2025 Matchday 7 | 1. FC Nürnberg | 0–3 | Hertha BSC | Nürnberg |
| 13:30 CEST (UTC+2) | Drexler (yellow card) 78'; Grzywacz (yellow card) 90+2' | Report | Winkler 2'; Cuisance 42'; Reese (yellow card) 45+5'; Eichhorn (yellow card) 58'; Dárdai (yellow card) 60'; Kownacki 85' | Stadium: Max-Morlock-Stadion; Attendance: 38,923; Referee: Marc-Philipp Eckermann |

| 3 October 2025 Matchday 8 | Fortuna Düsseldorf | 2–3 | 1. FC Nürnberg | Düsseldorf |
| 18:30 CEST (UTC+2) | El Azzouzi (yellow card) 42' (goal) 67'; Oberdorf (yellow card) 61'; Breithaupt (yellow card) 70'; Rasmussen 83' | Report | Markhiyev (yellow card) 6'; Lubach 25'; Justvan 80' (pen.); Becker 85' (yellow card) 88' | Stadium: Merkur Spiel-Arena; Attendance: 38,204 |

| 19 October 2025 Matchday 9 | 1. FC Nürnberg | 1–1 | Holstein Kiel | Nürnberg |
| 13:30 CEST (UTC+2) | Zoma 28'; Drexler (yellow card) 68'; Gruber (yellow card) 75'; Lochoshvili (yellow card) 86'; Markhiyev (yellow card) 90+1' | Report | Johansson 86'; Zec (yellow card) 87' | Stadium: Max-Morlock-Stadion; Attendance: 31,079; Referee: Timo Gansloweit |

| 26 October 2025 Matchday 10 | 1. FC Kaiserslautern | 1–1 | 1. FC Nürnberg | Kaiserslautern |
| 13:30 CET (UTC+1) | Haas (yellow card) 32'; Hanslik 45'; Sirch (yellow card) 52'; Gyamfi (yellow card) 74' | Report | Justvan (yellow card) 37'; Lubach (yellow card) 59'; Lochoshvili (yellow card) 83'; Knoche 90+3' (pen.) | Stadium: Fritz-Walter-Stadion; Attendance: 48,000; Referee: Sören Storks |

| 1 November 2025 Matchday 11 | 1. FC Nürnberg | 2–1 | Eintracht Braunschweig | Nürnberg |
| 13:00 CET (UTC+1) | Zoma 19'; Becker 33'; Markhiyev (yellow card) 45+1'; Lochoshvili (yellow card) 90' | Report | Ehlers 40' (yellow card) 87' (yellow-red card) 90+4'; Di Michele (yellow card) 84' | Stadium: Max-Morlock-Stadion; Attendance: 33,159; Referee: Lukas Benen |

| 7 November 2025 Matchday 12 | Dynamo Dresden | 1–2 | 1. FC Nürnberg | Dresden |
| 18:30 CET (UTC+1) | Daferner (yellow card) 44'; Kother 45+1'; Casar (yellow card) 81'; Menzel (yellow card) 90+3' | Report | Lubach 1' (yellow card) 73'; Janisch 51'; Becker (yellow card) 84'; Markhiyev (yellow card) 90+5' | Stadium: Stadion Dresden; Attendance: 31,749; Referee: Eric-Dominic Weisbach |

| 23 November 2025 Matchday 13 | 1. FC Nürnberg | 2–0 | DSC Arminia Bielefeld | Nürnberg |
| 13:30 CET (UTC+1) | Zoma (yellow card) 29'; Lubach 49' (pen.); Becker 56'; Demba Diop (yellow card) 58'; Yılmaz (yellow card) 70' | Report | Boakye (yellow card) 30'; Corboz (yellow card) 48'; Schneider (yellow card) 52' | Stadium: Max-Morlock-Stadion; Attendance: 33,940; Referee: Robert Schröder |

| 29 November 2025 Matchday 14 | 1. FC Magdeburg | 3–0 | 1. FC Nürnberg | Magdeburg |
| 20:30 CET (UTC+1) | Gnaka (yellow card) 13'; Żukowski 73', 90+6'; Mathisen (yellow card) 85'; Atik (yellow card) 90'; Breunig 90+10' | Report | Yılmaz (yellow card) 32'; Lubach (yellow card) 72' (yellow-red card) 76' | Stadium: MDCC-Arena; Attendance: 26,943; Referee: Felix Bickel |

| 7 December 2025 Matchday 15 | 1. FC Nürnberg | 2–2 | SpVgg Greuther Fürth | Nürnberg |
| 13:30 CET (UTC+1) | Janisch (yellow card) 12'; Lochoshvili 48'; Zoma 57'; Becker (yellow card) 88' | Report | Futkeu (yellow card) 12'; Klaus 54'; Keller 61'; Dehm (yellow card) 63'; Schlieck (yellow card) 90+5' | Stadium: Max-Morlock-Stadion; Attendance: 47,150; Referee: Lars Erbst |

| 14 December 2025 Matchday 16 | FC Schalke 04 | 1–0 | 1. FC Nürnberg | Gelsenkirchen |
| 13:30 CET (UTC+1) | Becker 52'; Kuruçay (yellow card) 54'; Schallenberg (yellow card) 67'; Gomis (yellow card) 90+5' | Report | Lochoshvili (yellow card) 44'; Markhiyev (yellow card) 87'; Lubach (yellow card) 90+5' | Stadium: Veltins-Arena; Attendance: 62,078; Referee: Christian Dingert |

| 21 December 2025 Matchday 17 | 1. FC Nürnberg | 2–1 | Hannover 96 | Nürnberg |
| 13:30 CET (UTC+1) | Lubach (yellow card) 31' (goal) 44'; Zoma 49'; Baack (yellow card) 53'; Demba Diop (yellow card) 66'; Karafiát (yellow card) 90+2' | Report | Källman 19'; Tomiak (yellow card) 86'; Noll (yellow card) 90+1' | Stadium: Max-Morlock-Stadion; Attendance: 34,022; Referee: Max Burda |

| 17 January 2026 Matchday 18 | 1. FC Nürnberg | 3–2 | SV 07 Elversberg | Nürnberg |
| 13:00 CET (UTC+1) | Zoma (yellow card) 27'; Justvan 56'; Markhiyev (yellow card) 67'; Scobel (yellow card) 69' (goal) 71', 90+3'; Yılmaz (yellow card) 82'; Lochoshvili (yellow card) 83' | Report | Zimmerschied 39'; Keidel (yellow card) 54'; Malanga 65' | Stadium: Max-Morlock-Stadion; Attendance: 25,639; Referee: Konrad Oldhfer |

| 23 January 2026 Matchday 19 | SV Darmstadt 98 | 2–0 | 1. FC Nürnberg | Darmstadt |
| 18:30 CET (UTC+1) | Akiyama 60'; Marseiler 75'; Papela (yellow card) 77' | Report | | Stadium: Merck-Stadion am Böllenfalltor; Attendance: 17,810 |

| 30 January 2026 Matchday 20 | 1. FC Nürnberg | 1–1 | SC Preußen Münster | Nürnberg |
| 18:30 CET (UTC+1) | Gruber (yellow card) 35'; Markhiyev (yellow card) 53'; Zoma 56' | Report | Sertdemir (yellow card) 10'; Heuer (yellow card) 36'; Hendrix 63' (yellow card) 90+4'; Rondić (yellow card) 90+3' | Stadium: Max-Morlock-Stadion; Attendance: 26,170; Referee: Felix Prigan |

| 07 February 2026 Matchday 21 | SC Paderborn 07 | 2–1 | 1. FC Nürnberg | Paderborn |
| 13:00 CET (UTC+1) | Klaas 26' (pen.); Curda 29'; Obermair (yellow card) 80'; Marino (yellow card) 90+4' | Report | Janisch (yellow card) 31'; Lubach (red card) 51'; Markhiyev (yellow card) 57'; Lochoshvili 75'; Becker (yellow card) 83' | Stadium: Benteler-Arena; Attendance: 13,440; Referee: Eric-Dominic Weisbach |

| 13 February 2026 Matchday 22 | 1. FC Nürnberg | 5–1 | Karlsruher SC | Nürnberg |
| 18:30 CET (UTC+1) | Justvan 25', 28'; Zoma 41', 50', 65'; Adam Markhiyev (yellow card) 59' | Report | Scholl (yellow card) 38'; Wanitzek 58'; Kwon (yellow card) 72'; Kobald (yellow card) 86' | Stadium: Max-Morlock-Stadion; Attendance: 28,000; Referee: Tobias Stieler |

| 20 February 2026 Matchday 23 | VfL Bochum | 1–1 | 1. FC Nürnberg | Bochum |
| 18:30 CET (UTC+1) | Wittek (yellow card) 23'; Onyeka 72' (pen.) | Report | Markhiyev (yellow card) 25'; Zoma 38'; Yılmaz (yellow card) 43'; Lochoshvili (yellow card) 87' | Stadium: Vonovia Ruhrstadion; Attendance: 26,000; Referee: Patrick Ittrich |

| 1 March 2026 Matchday 24 | Hertha BSC | 2–1 | 1. FC Nürnberg | Berlin |
| 13:30 CET (UTC+1) | Brekalo 20', 88' | Report | Baack 45+1'; Gruber (yellow card) 79'; Becker (yellow card) 86' | Stadium: Olympiastadion; Attendance: 43,353; Referee: Patrick Alt |

| 7 March 2026 Matchday 25 | 1. FC Nürnberg | 0–1 | Fortuna Düsseldorf | Nürnberg |
| 13:00 CET (UTC+1) | Nzingoula (yellow card) 90+4' | Report | Egouli (yellow card) 45'; Appelkamp 53'; Muslija (yellow card) 77' | Stadium: Max-Morlock-Stadion; Attendance: 32,266; Referee: Timo Gansloweit |

| 14 March 2026 Matchday 26 | Holstein Kiel | 2–3 | 1. FC Nürnberg | Kiel |
| 13:00 CET (UTC+1) | Kaprálik 29'; Nekić (yellow card) 35'; Schwab (yellow card) 37'; Davidsen 45+8'; Zec (yellow card) 54' | Report | Justvan 14', 22'; Nzingoula (yellow card) 33'; Lubach (yellow card) 42'; Zoma 72'; Buchmann (yellow card) 83'; Markhiyev (yellow card) 86'; Becker (yellow card) 88' | Stadium: Holstein-Stadion; Attendance: 13,812; Referee: Robert Kampka |

| 21 March 2026 Matchday 27 | 1. FC Nürnberg | 3–0 | 1. FC Kaiserslautern | Nürnberg |
| 13:00 CET (UTC+1) | Lochoshvili 2', 83'; Justvan (yellow card) 55'; Markhiyev 58' | Report | Ritter (yellow card) 15'; Sirch (yellow card) 26'; Kunze (yellow card) 36' | Stadium: Max-Morlock-Stadion; Attendance: 39,849; Referee: Felix Wagner |

| 5 April 2026 Matchday 28 | Eintracht Braunschweig | 1–1 | 1. FC Nürnberg | Braunschweig |
| 13:30 CEST (UTC+2) | Mijatović 61' (yellow card) 89' | Report | Nzingoula 17'; Gruber (yellow card) 37'; Baack (yellow card) 69' | Stadium: Eintracht-Stadion; Attendance: 21,000; Referee: Tom Bauer |

| 11 April 2026 Matchday 29 | 1. FC Nürnberg | 0–2 | Dynamo Dresden | Nürnberg |
| 13:00 CEST (UTC+2) | Yılmaz (yellow card) 76' | Report | Koudossou 55' (o.g.); Ceka (yellow card) 63'; Bobzien 83' | Stadium: Max-Morlock-Stadion; Attendance: 45,000; Referee: Felix Bickel |

| 18 April 2026 Matchday 30 | Arminia Bielefeld | 1–1 | 1. FC Nürnberg | Bielefeld |
| 13:00 CEST (UTC+2) | Handwerker 81'; Bauer (yellow card) 90+2'; Russo (yellow card) 90+2' | Report | Zoma 8'; Fernández (yellow card) 35' | Stadium: SchücoArena; Attendance: 25,134; Referee: Robin Braun |

| 26 April 2026 Matchday 31 | 1. FC Nürnberg | 1–0 | 1. FC Magdeburg | Nürnberg |
| 13:30 CEST (UTC+2) | Lubach 45+2' (yellow card) 56' | Report | Bockhorn (yellow card) 54'; Musonda (yellow card) 70'; Mathisen (yellow card) 79' | Stadium: Max-Morlock-Stadion; Referee: Patrick Schwengers |

| 3 May 2026 Matchday 32 | SpVgg Greuther Fürth | 1–1 | 1. FC Nürnberg | Fürth |
| 13:30 CEST (UTC+2) | Futkeu 13'; Klaus (yellow card) 53'; Arifi (yellow card) 90' | Report | Markhiyev (yellow card) 15'; Gruber 45+3'; Fernández (yellow card) 76' | Stadium: Sportpark Ronhof; Attendance: 16,126; Referee: Sören Storks |

| 9 May 2026 Matchday 33 | 1. FC Nürnberg | 3–0 | FC Schalke 04 | Nürnberg |
| 18:30 CEST (UTC+2) | Schallenberg 20' (o.g.); Koudossou 45+2'; Becker (yellow card) 45+4'; Zoma 72' (yellow card) 73' | Report | Becker (yellow card) 37'; Ayhan (yellow card) 62' | Stadium: Max-Morlock-Stadion; Attendance: 47,000; Referee: Felix Prigan |

| 17 May 2026 Matchday 34 | Hannover 96 | v | 1. FC Nürnberg | Hannover |
| 15:30 CEST (UTC+2) | | | | Stadium: HDI-Arena |

=== DFB-Pokal ===
First round

| 16 August 2025 First round | FV Illertissen | 3–3 (a.e.t.); 6–5 (p) | 1. FC Nürnberg | Vöhlinstadion, Illertissen |
| 15:30 CEST (UTC+2) | Milic 2'; Glessing 43'; Rühle 90' | Report | Yılmaz 65'; Stepanov 78'; Telalović 86' (pen.) | Attendance: 5,000; Referee: Patrick Alt |

== Statistics ==
=== Appearances and goals ===
As of 26 April 2026.

| No. | Pos | Nat | Player | Total | | 2. Bundesliga | | DFB-Pokal | |
| No. | Pos | Nat | Player | Apps | Goals | Apps | Goals | Apps | Goals |
Goalkeepers
| 1 | GK | (Germany) GER | Jan Reichert | 31 | 0 | 31 | 0 | 0 | 0 |
| 13 | GK | (Poland) POL | Robin Lisewski | 0 | 0 | 0 | 0 | 0 | 0 |
| | GK | (Germany) GER | Nicolas Ortegel | 0 | 0 | 0 | 0 | 0 | 0 |
| 26 | GK | (Germany) GER | Christian Mathenia | 1 | 0 | 0 | 0 | 1 | 0 |
Defenders
| 3 | DF | (Brazil) BRA | Danilo Soares | 0 | 0 | 0 | 0 | 0 | 0 |
| 4 | DF | (Peru) PER | Fabio Gruber | 31 | 0 | 30 | 0 | 1 | 0 |
| 8 | DF | (Germany) GER | Henri Koudossou | 13 | 1 | 11+1 | 1 | 1 | 0 |
| 15 | DF | (Germany) GER | Tim Drexler | 14 | 0 | 9+5 | 0 | 0 | 0 |
| 20 | DF | (Spain) ESP | Javi Fernández | 5 | 0 | 4+1 | 0 | 0 | 0 |
| 21 | DF | (Turkey) TUR | Berkay Yılmaz | 32 | 1 | 31 | 0 | 1 | 1 |
| 22 | DF | (Germany) GER | Enrico Valentini | 0 | 0 | 0 | 0 | 0 | 0 |
| 24 | DF | (Georgia (country)) GEO | Luka Lochoshvili | 32 | 4 | 31 | 4 | 1 | 0 |
| 27 | DF | (Germany) GER | Justin von der Hitz | 6 | 0 | 4+2 | 0 | 0 | 0 |
| 28 | DF | (Germany) GER | Tarek Buchmann | 1 | 0 | 0+1 | 0 | 0 | 0 |
| 31 | DF | (Germany) GER | Robin Knoche | 12 | 1 | 4+7 | 1 | 1 | 0 |
| 32 | DF | (Germany) GER | Tim Janisch | 21 | 1 | 10+10 | 1 | 1 | 0 |
| 36 | DF | (Bosnia and Herzegovina) BIH | Kristian Mandic | 0 | 0 | 0 | 0 | 0 | 0 |
| 41 | DF | (Germany) GER | Eric Porstner | 1 | 0 | 0+1 | 0 | 0 | 0 |
| 43 | DF | (Germany) GER | Jannik Hofmann | 0 | 0 | 0 | 0 | 0 | 0 |
| 44 | DF | (Armenia) ARM | Styopa Mkrtchyan | 7 | 0 | 5+2 | 0 | 0 | 0 |
Midfielders
| 5 | MF | (Germany) GER | Tom Baack | 19 | 1 | 9+10 | 1 | 0 | 0 |
| 6 | MF | (Finland) FIN | Adam Markhiyev | 25 | 1 | 24+1 | 1 | 0 | 0 |
| 10 | MF | (Germany) GER | Julian Justvan | 31 | 7 | 31 | 7 | 0 | 0 |
| 16 | MF | (Germany) GER | Marko Soldic | 2 | 0 | 0+2 | 0 | 0 | 0 |
| 17 | MF | (Morocco) MAR | Ayoub Chaikhoun | 1 | 0 | 0 | 0 | 1 | 0 |
| 18 | MF | (Germany) GER | Rafael Lubach | 28 | 6 | 23+4 | 6 | 1 | 0 |
| 19 | MF | (Poland) POL | Eryk Grzywacz | 0 | 0 | 0 | 0 | 0 | 0 |
| 22 | MF | (France) FRA | Rabby Nzingoula | 12 | 1 | 10+2 | 1 | 0 | 0 |
| 25 | MF | (Germany) GER | Finn Ole Becker | 27 | 3 | 22+5 | 3 | 0 | 0 |
| 35 | MF | (Germany) GER | Simon Joachims | 0 | 0 | 0 | 0 | 0 | 0 |
Forwards
| 7 | FW | (Martinique) MTQ | Mickaël Biron | 14 | 0 | 3+10 | 0 | 1 | 0 |
| 11 | FW | (Ukraine) UKR | Artem Stepanov | 14 | 1 | 7+6 | 0 | 0+1 | 1 |
| 14 | FW | (Germany) GER | Benjamin Goller | 21 | 2 | 15+5 | 2 | 1 | 0 |
| 23 | FW | (Burkina Faso) BFA | Mohamed Ali Zoma | 28 | 11 | 27+1 | 11 | 0 | 0 |
| 33 | FW | (Germany) GER | Adriano Grimaldi | 26 | 1 | 9+17 | 1 | 0 | 0 |
| 37 | FW | (Republic of the Congo) CGO | Noah Maboulou | 2 | 0 | 0+1 | 0 | 0+1 | 0 |
| 39 | FW | (Germany) GER | Piet Scobel | 18 | 2 | 7+11 | 2 | 0 | 0 |
| 42 | FW | (Croatia) CRO | Tino Kusanović | 0 | 0 | 0 | 0 | 0 | 0 |
| 46 | FW | (Germany) GER | Levin Chiumento | 0 | 0 | 0 | 0 | 0 | 0 |
Players transferred out during the season
| - | GK | (Slovakia) SVK | Michal Kukučka | 0 | 0 | 0 | 0 | 0 | 0 |
| 6 | MF | (Germany) GER | Florian Flick | 4 | 0 | 3 | 0 | 1 | 0 |
| - | MF | (Senegal) SEN | Pape Demba Diop | 10 | 0 | 7+3 | 0 | 0 | 0 |
| - | MF | (Germany) GER | Caspar Jander | 2 | 0 | 1 | 0 | 0+1 | 0 |
| - | MF | (Germany) GER | Winners Osawe | 0 | 0 | 0 | 0 | 0 | 0 |
| 22 | MF | (Sierra Leone) SLE | Hindolo Mustapha | 0 | 0 | 0 | 0 | 0 | 0 |
| 33 | DF | (Germany) GER | Nick Seidel | 0 | 0 | 0 | 0 | 0 | 0 |
| 34 | FW | (Germany) GER | Dustin Forkel | 2 | 0 | 0+2 | 0 | 0 | 0 |
| 44 | DF | (Czech Republic) CZE | Ondřej Karafiát | 1 | 0 | 0 | 0 | 0+1 | 0 |
| - | FW | (Germany) GER | Semir Telalović | 9 | 1 | 2+6 | 0 | 1 | 1 |

Last updated: 26 April 2026
Source: Competitions

=== Goalscorers ===
As of 26 April 2026.

| Rank | No. | Pos. | Nat. | Player | 2. Bundesliga | DFB-Pokal | Total |
|---|---|---|---|---|---|---|---|
| 1 | 23 | FW | (Burkina Faso) | Mohamed Ali Zoma | 11 | 0 | 11 |
| 2 | 10 | MF | (Germany) | Julian Justvan | 7 | 0 | 7 |
| 3 | 18 | MF | (Germany) | Rafael Lubach | 6 | 0 | 6 |
| 4 | 24 | DF | (Georgia (country)) | Luka Lochoshvili | 4 | 0 | 4 |
| 5 | 25 | MF | (Germany) | Finn Ole Becker | 3 | 0 | 3 |
| 6 | 14 | FW | (Germany) | Benjamin Goller | 2 | 0 | 2 |
| 6 | 39 | FW | (Germany) | Piet Scobel | 2 | 0 | 2 |
| 8 | 5 | MF | (Germany) | Tom Baack | 1 | 0 | 1 |
| 8 | 6 | MF | (Finland) | Adam Markhiyev | 1 | 0 | 1 |
| 8 | 8 | DF | (Germany) | Henri Koudossou | 1 | 0 | 1 |
| 8 | 11 | FW | (Ukraine) | Artem Stepanov | 0 | 1 | 1 |
| 8 | 21 | DF | (Turkey) | Berkay Yılmaz | 0 | 1 | 1 |
| 8 | 22 | MF | (France) | Rabby Nzingoula | 1 | 0 | 1 |
| 8 | 31 | DF | (Germany) | Robin Knoche | 1 | 0 | 1 |
| 8 | 32 | DF | (Germany) | Tim Janisch | 1 | 0 | 1 |
| 8 | 33 | FW | (Germany) | Adriano Grimaldi | 1 | 0 | 1 |
| 8 | - | FW | (Germany) | Semir Telalović | 0 | 1 | 1 |
| Own goals | | | | | 0 | 0 | 0 |
| Totals | | | | | 42 | 3 | 45 |
