= 2022–23 UC AlbinoLeffe season =

UC AlbinoLeffe
2022–23 season
- Manager: Giuseppe Biava (until 21 February); Claudio Foscarini (from 21 February)
- Stadium: AlbinoLeffe Stadium
- Serie C Group A: 19th
- Relegation play-outs: Winners
- Coppa Italia Serie C: First round
- Biggest defeat: Arzignano Valchiampo 5–1 AlbinoLeffe

The 2022–23 season was UC AlbinoLeffe's 25th season in existence and fourth consecutive season in the Serie C. They also competed in the Coppa Italia Serie C.

== Players ==
=== First-team squad ===
As of 31 January 2023

Note: Flags indicate national team as defined under FIFA eligibility rules; some limited exceptions apply. Players may hold more than one non-FIFA nationality.

No.	Pos.	Nation	Player
1	GK	ITA	Leandro Pratelli
4	DF	ITA	Mirko Saltarelli
5	DF	ITA	Stefano Marchetti
6	MF	ITA	Issa Doumbia
7	MF	ROU	Luca Mihai (on loan from SPAL)
8	MF	ITA	Carmelo Muzio
10	FW	ITA	Jacopo Manconi
11	FW	CIV	Mohamed Alì Zoma
12	GK	ITA	Lorenzo Facchetti
13	DF	ITA	Luca Milesi
14	MF	ITA	Michael Brentan
16	DF	ROU	Mihai Gușu
17	MF	ITA	Carmine Giorgione (Captain)
18	DF	ITA	Michael Ntube

No.	Pos.	Nation	Player
19	FW	ITA	Andrea Cocco
20	FW	ITA	Luca Petrungaro
21	MF	ITA	Amedeo Poletti
22	GK	ITA	Andrea Pagno
24	DF	ITA	Filippo Concas
26	DF	ITA	Jacopo Gelli
27	DF	ITA	Armando Miculi
29	FW	ITA	Davide Rosso
30	MF	ITA	Marco Piccoli
33	DF	ITA	Diego Borghini
35	GK	ITA	Daniel Offredi
40	MF	FRA	Gaël Genevier (Vice-captain)
62	MF	ITA	Ruggero Frosinini

== Pre-season and friendlies ==
Win Draw Loss

4 August 2022 Friendly	AlbinoLeffe (Italy)	4–0	(Italy) Caronnese

== Competitions ==
=== Overall record ===
Competition	First match	Last match	Starting round	Final position	Record							
Competition	First match	Last match	Starting round	Final position	Pld	W	D	L	GF	GA	GD	Win %
Serie C	3 September 2022	22 April 2023	Matchday 1	19th	38	9	11	18	43	54	−11	23.68
Serie C relegation play-outs	6 May 2023	13 May 2023	First leg	Winners	2	1	1	0	2	1	+1	50.00
Coppa Italia Serie C	5 October 2022		First round	First round	1	0	0	1	0	1	−1	0.00
Total					41	10	12	19	45	56	−11	24.39

Source: Soccerway

=== Serie C ===
==== League table ====
Pos	Team	Pld	W	D	L	GF	GA	GD	Pts	Qualification
16	Mantova (T)	38	12	9	17	48	62	−14	45	Readmitted
17	Sangiuliano City (R)	38	12	6	20	38	46	−8	42	Qualification for the relegation play-outs
18	Triestina (O)	38	9	12	17	31	45	−14	39	Qualification for the relegation play-outs
19	AlbinoLeffe (O)	38	9	11	18	43	54	−11	38 (Note: AlbinoLeffe ahead of Piacenza due to general goal difference. Head-to-head matches: PIA-ALB 2-2; ALB-PIA 1-1)	Qualification for the relegation play-outs
20	Piacenza (R)	38	8	14	16	42	59	−17	38	Relegation to Serie D

Updated to match(es) played on 16 April 2023. Source: Lega Pro, Soccerway (in English)
Rules for classification: 1) Points; 2) Head-to-head points; 3) Head-to-head goal difference; 4) Goal difference; 5) Goals scored; 6) Lower goals against; 7) Wins; 8) Lower losses; 9) Away wins; 10) Lower home losses.
(O) Play-off winners; (R) Relegated; (T) Qualified, but not yet for the particular phase indicated

==== Results summary ====
Overall								Home						Away					
Pld	W	D	L	GF	GA	GD	Pts	W	D	L	GF	GA	GD	W	D	L	GF	GA	GD
38	9	11	18	43	54	−11	38	3	7	9	19	25	−6	6	4	9	24	29	−5

Source: Worldfootball

==== Results by round ====
Round	1	2	3	4	5	6	7	8	9	10	11	12	13	14	15	16	17	18	19	20	21	22	23	24	25	26	27	28	29	30	31	32	33	34	35	36	37	38
Ground	H	A	A	H	A	H	H	A	H	A	H	A	H	A	H	A	H	A	H	A	H	H	A	H	A	A	H	A	H	A	H	A	H	A	H	A	H	A
Result	L	D	L	D	D	D	W	W	L	D	D	W	D	D	L	W	L	W	D	L	W	W	L	D	L	W	L	L	L	L	L	L	L	W	L	L	D	L
Position	14	16	17	19	17	17	14	13	14	15	15	14	15	14	14	13	14	12	12	13	11	9	11	12	13	11	13	15	17	18	17	18	18	17	18	18	18	19

Source: Worldfootball
A = Away; H = Home; W = Win; D = Draw; L = Loss

==== Matches ====
3 September 2022 1	AlbinoLeffe	0–1	Feralpisalò	Zanica
CEST (UTC+2)				Stadium: AlbinoLeffe Stadium

10 September 2022 2	Pro Sesto	2–2	AlbinoLeffe	Sesto San Giovanni
CEST (UTC+2)				Stadium: Stadio Ernesto Breda

13 September 2022 3	Pergolettese	2–0	AlbinoLeffe	Crema
CEST (UTC+2)

17 September 2022 4	AlbinoLeffe	1–1	Vicenza	Zanica
CEST (UTC+2)				Stadium: AlbinoLeffe Stadium

24 September 2022 5	Piacenza	2–2	AlbinoLeffe	Piacenza
CEST (UTC+2)

1 October 2022 6	AlbinoLeffe	1–1	Lecco	Zanica
CEST (UTC+2)				Stadium: AlbinoLeffe Stadium

9 October 2022 7	AlbinoLeffe	3–1	Novara	Zanica
CEST (UTC+2)				Stadium: AlbinoLeffe Stadium

16 October 2022 8	Triestina	0–3	AlbinoLeffe	Trieste
CEST (UTC+2)				Stadium: Stadio Nereo Rocco

19 October 2022 9	AlbinoLeffe	0–3	Arzignano Valchiampo	Zanica
CEST (UTC+2)				Stadium: AlbinoLeffe Stadium

23 October 2022 10	Renate	0–0	AlbinoLeffe
CEST (UTC+2)

30 October 2022 11	AlbinoLeffe	1–1	Juventus Next Gen	Zanica
CET (UTC+1)				Stadium: AlbinoLeffe Stadium

5 November 2022 12	Pro Vercelli	1–3	AlbinoLeffe
CET (UTC+1)

12 November 2022 13	AlbinoLeffe	1–1	Sangiuliano	Zanica
CET (UTC+1)				Stadium: AlbinoLeffe Stadium

19 November 2022 14	Padova	2–2	AlbinoLeffe	Padua
CET (UTC+1)

27 November 2022 15	AlbinoLeffe	0–1	Pro Patria	Zanica
CET (UTC+1)				Stadium: AlbinoLeffe Stadium

30 November 2022 16	Mantova	0–1	AlbinoLeffe	Mantua
CET (UTC+1)				Stadium: Stadio Danilo Martelli

4 December 2022 17	AlbinoLeffe	0–1	Virtus Verona	Zanica
CET (UTC+1)				Stadium: AlbinoLeffe Stadium

11 December 2022 18	Trento	0–1	AlbinoLeffe	Trento
CET (UTC+1)				Stadium: Stadio Briamasco

17 December 2022 19	AlbinoLeffe	1–1	Pordenone	Zanica
CET (UTC+1)				Stadium: AlbinoLeffe Stadium

23 December 2022 20	Feralpisalò	1–0	AlbinoLeffe	Salò
CET (UTC+1)				Stadium: Stadio Lino Turina

8 January 2023 21	AlbinoLeffe	3–1	Pro Sesto	Zanica
CET (UTC+1)				Stadium: AlbinoLeffe Stadium

14 January 2023 22	AlbinoLeffe	2–0	Pergolettese	Zanica
CET (UTC+1)				Stadium: AlbinoLeffe Stadium

22 January 2023 23	Vicenza	3–0	AlbinoLeffe	Vicenza
CET (UTC+1)				Stadium: Stadio Romeo Menti

29 January 2023 24	AlbinoLeffe	1–1	Piacenza	Zanica
CET (UTC+1)				Stadium: AlbinoLeffe Stadium

1 February 2023 25	Lecco	2–1	AlbinoLeffe	Lecco
CET (UTC+1)

5 February 2023 26	Novara	1–2	AlbinoLeffe	Novara
CET (UTC+1)

11 February 2023 27	AlbinoLeffe	0–1	Triestina	Zanica
CET (UTC+1)				Stadium: AlbinoLeffe Stadium

18 February 2023 28	Arzignano Valchiampo	5–1	AlbinoLeffe	Arzignano
CET (UTC+1)

26 February 2023 29	AlbinoLeffe	2–3	Renate	Zanica
CET (UTC+1)				Stadium: AlbinoLeffe Stadium

6 March 2023 30	Juventus Next Gen	2–1	AlbinoLeffe	Arzignano
CET (UTC+1)

12 March 2023 31	AlbinoLeffe	0–1	Pro Vercelli	Zanica
CET (UTC+1)				Stadium: AlbinoLeffe Stadium

15 March 2023 32	Sangiuliano	2–0	AlbinoLeffe	San Giuliano Milanese
CET (UTC+1)	Alcibiade 36'; Fusi 90+3'			Stadium: Campo Sportivo Comunale 1

19 March 2023 33	AlbinoLeffe	2–3	Padova	Zanica
CET (UTC+1)				Stadium: AlbinoLeffe Stadium

26 March 2023 34	Pro Patria	1–4	AlbinoLeffe	Busto Arsizio
CET (UTC+1)				Stadium: Stadio Carlo Speroni

2 April 2023 35	AlbinoLeffe	0–2	Mantova	Zanica
CEST (UTC+2)				Stadium: AlbinoLeffe Stadium

8 April 2023 36	Virtus Verona	2–1	AlbinoLeffe	Verona
17:30 CEST (UTC+2)	Juanito 88'; Kristoffersen 90+1'		Cocco 67'	Stadium: Stadio Gavagnin Nocini; Referee: Davide Gandino

16 April 2023 37	AlbinoLeffe	1–1	Trento	Zanica
14:30 CEST (UTC+2)	Manconi 26' (pen.)		Petrović 1'	Stadium: AlbinoLeffe Stadium; Referee: Dario Madonia

22 April 2023 38	Pordenone	1–0	AlbinoLeffe	Fontanafredda
17:30 CEST (UTC+2)	Pinato 47'			Stadium: Stadio Comunale Omero Tognon; Referee: Dario Di Francesco

==== Relegation play-outs ====
6 May 2023 First leg	AlbinoLeffe	1–0	Mantova	Zanica
17:00 CEST (UTC+2)	Manconi 31'			Stadium: AlbinoLeffe Stadium; Referee: Giuseppe Collu

13 May 2023 Second leg	Mantova	1–1 (1–2 agg.)	AlbinoLeffe	Mantua
17:00 CEST (UTC+2)	De Francesco 80' (pen.)		Doumbia 52'	Stadium: Stadio Danilo Martelli; Referee: Paride Tremolada

=== Coppa Italia Serie C ===
5 October 2022 First round	Pro Patria	1–0	AlbinoLeffe	Busto Arsizio
CEST (UTC+2)				Stadium: Stadio Carlo Speroni
