= Osawe =

Osawe is the birthname of Oba ('king') Esigie of the Kingdom of Benin.

Osawe is a Nigerian surname. Notable people with the surname include:

- Osayamen Osawe (born 1993), Nigerian footballer
- Winners Osawe (born 2006), German footballer
