= Mohamed Alì Zoma =

Italian footballer (born 2003)

Personal information
- Date of birth: 16 December 2003 (age 22)
- Place of birth: Merate, Italy
- Height: 1.74 m (5 ft 9 in)
- Positions: Winger; forward

Team information
- Current team: 1. FC Nürnberg
- Number: 23

Youth career
- –2022: AlbinoLeffe

Senior career*
Years	Team	Apps	(Gls)
2021–2025	AlbinoLeffe	114	(27)
2025–	1. FC Nürnberg	35	(20)

International career^{‡}
2026–	Italy	1	(0)
- * Club domestic league appearances and goals as of 13:09, 19 September 2026 (UTC) ‡ National team caps and goals as of 25 September 2026

Mohamed Alì Zoma (born 16 December 2003) is an Italian professional footballer who plays as a winger or forward for 2. Bundesliga club 1. FC Nürnberg and the Italy national team.

== Early life ==
Nicknamed "Momo", Zoma was born on 16 December 2003, in Merate, Italy. He is of Burkinabé descent from his father and of Ivorian descent from his mother.

== Club career ==
Zoma joined the youth academy of Italian side AlbinoLeffe at the age of 13, and was promoted to the club's senior team in 2021, where he made 114 league appearances and scored 27 goals in Serie C.

On 19 August 2025, he moved to Germany and signed with 2. Bundesliga side 1. FC Nürnberg.

== International career ==
Zoma was one of the players who were called up with the Italy national team by head coach Roberto Mancini for the 2026–27 UEFA Nations League matches against Belgium, Turkey and France between 25 September and 5 October 2026.

== Career statistics ==
=== Club ===
As of match played 19 September 2026

Appearances and goals by club, season and competition
Club	Season	League			National cup		Europe		Other		Total	
Club	Season	Division	Apps	Goals	Apps	Goals	Apps	Goals	Apps	Goals	Apps	Goals
AlbinoLeffe	2021–22	Serie C	6	2	2	0	—		—		8	2
AlbinoLeffe	2022–23	Serie C	36	3	1	0	—		2	0	39	3
AlbinoLeffe	2023–24	Serie C	37	9	0	0	—		—		37	9
AlbinoLeffe	2024–25	Serie C	35	13	1	1	—		1	1	37	15
AlbinoLeffe	Total		114	27	4	1	0	0	3	1	121	29
1. FC Nürnberg	2025–26	2. Bundesliga	29	14	0	0	—		—		29	14
1. FC Nürnberg	2026–27	2. Bundesliga	6	6	1	0	—		—		7	6
1. FC Nürnberg	Total		35	20	1	0	0	0	0	0	36	20
Career total			149	47	5	1	0	0	3	1	157	49

=== International ===
As of match played 25 September 2026

Appearances and goals by national team and year
National team	Year	Apps	Goals
Italy	2026	1	0
Total		1	0
