= Khalid Abu El Haija =

Palestinian footballer

Personal information
- Date of birth: 13 November 2005 (age 21)
- Place of birth: Schleiz, Germany
- Height: 1.97 m (6 ft 6 in)
- Position: Centre-back

Team information
- Current team: 1. FC Nürnberg II
- Number: 4

Youth career
- 2009–2015: SV Blau-Weiß 90 Neustadt
- 2015–2024: Carl Zeiss Jena

Senior career*
Years	Team	Apps	(Gls)
2024–2025	Carl Zeiss Jena	28	(0)
2025–	1. FC Nürnberg II	30	(3)
2026–	1. FC Nürnberg	0	(0)

International career^{‡}
2024	Palestine U19	3	(0)
2022	Palestine U20	11	(1)
2025–	Palestine U23	3	(2)
2025–	Palestine	8	(0)
- * Club domestic league appearances and goals as of 31 October 2026 ‡ National team caps and goals as of 14 November 2026

Khalid Abu El Haija (Arabic: خالد أبو الهيجا; born 13 November 2005) is a professional footballer who plays as a centre-back for the Regionalliga club 1. FC Nürnberg II. Born in Germany, he plays for the Palestine national team.

== Club career ==
Abu El Haija is a product of the youth academies of the German clubs SV Blau-Weiß 90 Neustadt and Carl Zeiss Jena. He began his senior career with Carl Zeiss Jena in the Regionalliga in 2024. On 9 June 2025, he transferred to 1. FC Nürnberg II. During the 2026–27 season, he was called up with 1. FC Nürnberg by head coach Miroslav Klose, first on 28 August 2026, for a 4–1 home win 2. Bundesliga match against Arminia Bielefeld, and later on 10 October, for a 4–4 home draw 2. Bundesliga match against VfL Wolfsburg, both times as an unused substitute however.

== International career ==
Abu El Haija was born in Germany to Palestinian parents and holds Palestinian and German dual-citizenship. He played for the Palestine U19s at the 2024 WAFF U-19 Championship. He debuted with Palestine in a friendly 3–0 loss to the Basque Country on 16 November 2025.
