= 2023–24 TSG 1899 Hoffenheim season =

TSG 1899 Hoffenheim
2023–24 season
- Owner: Dietmar Hopp (96%)
- President: Kristian Baumgärtner
- Head coach: Pellegrino Matarazzo
- Stadium: Rhein-Neckar-Arena
- Bundesliga: 7th
- DFB-Pokal: Second round
- Top goalscorer: League: Maximilian Beier (16); All: Andrej Kramarić (17)
- Average home league attendance: 24,559
Home colours	Away colours	Third colours

The 2023–24 season was TSG 1899 Hoffenheim's 125th season in existence and 16th consecutive season in the Bundesliga. They also competed in the DFB-Pokal.

== Players ==
=== First-team squad ===
As of 1 February 2024

Note: Flags indicate national team as defined under FIFA eligibility rules; some limited exceptions apply. Players may hold more than one non-FIFA nationality.

No.	Pos.	Nation	Player
1	GK	GER	Oliver Baumann (captain)
3	DF	CZE	Pavel Kadeřábek
5	DF	TUR	Ozan Kabak
6	MF	GER	Grischa Prömel
7	FW	GER	Mërgim Berisha
8	MF	GER	Dennis Geiger
9	FW	TOG	Ihlas Bebou
10	FW	NED	Wout Weghorst (on loan from Burnley)
11	MF	AUT	Florian Grillitsch
14	FW	GER	Maximilian Beier
15	DF	GHA	Kasim Nuhu
16	MF	GER	Anton Stach
19	DF	CZE	David Jurásek (on loan from Benfica)

No.	Pos.	Nation	Player
20	MF	GER	Finn Ole Becker
21	FW	GER	Marius Bülter
23	DF	USA	John Brooks
24	MF	GER	Marco John
25	DF	NGR	Kevin Akpoguma
27	FW	CRO	Andrej Kramarić
29	FW	DEN	Robert Skov
31	MF	GER	Bambasé Conté
34	DF	FRA	Stanley Nsoki
36	GK	GER	Nahuel Noll
37	GK	GER	Luca Philipp
39	MF	GER	Tom Bischof
40	MF	GER	Umut Tohumcu

=== Players out on loan ===
Note: Flags indicate national team as defined under FIFA eligibility rules; some limited exceptions apply. Players may hold more than one non-FIFA nationality.

No.	Pos.	Nation	Player
—	FW	GER	Fisnik Asllani (at Austria Wien until 30 June 2024)
—	FW	DEN	Jacob Bruun Larsen (at Burnley until 30 June 2024)
—	MF	GER	Muhammed Damar (at Hannover 96 until 30 June 2024)
—	MF	GER	Julian Justvan (at SV Darmstadt 98 until 30 June 2024)
—	DF	GER	Joshua Quarshie (at Fortuna Düsseldorf until 30 June 2024)
—	MF	MLI	Diadie Samassékou (at Cádiz until 30 June 2024)
—	DF	HUN	Attila Szalai (at SC Freiburg until 30 June 2024)

== Transfers ==
=== In ===
Pos.	Player	Transferred from	Fee	Date	Source
MF	(Austria) Florian Grillitsch	(Netherlands) Ajax	Free	1 July 2023	
MF	(Germany) Julian Justvan	(Germany) SC Paderborn	€1,500,000	1 July 2023	
FW	(Germany) Marius Bülter	(Germany) Schalke 04	€2,900,000	6 July 2023	
DF	(Hungary) Attila Szalai	(Turkey) Fenerbahçe	€12,300,000	24 July 2023	
FW	(Netherlands) Wout Weghorst	(England) Burnley	Loan	9 August 2023	
FW	(Germany) Mërgim Berisha	(Germany) FC Augsburg	€14,000,000	30 August 2023	
MF	(Germany) Anton Stach	(Germany) Mainz 05	€11,000,000	1 September 2023	
DF	(Czech Republic) David Jurásek	(Portugal) Benfica	Loan	22 January 2024	

=== Out ===
Pos.	Player	Transferred to	Fee	Date	Source
MF	(Austria) Christoph Baumgartner	(Germany) RB Leipzig	€24,000,000	1 July 2023	
DF	(Bosnia and Herzegovina) Ermin Bičakčić		Free	1 July 2023	
GK	(Germany) Philipp Pentke		Free	1 July 2023	
DF	(Austria) Stefan Posch	(Italy) Bologna	€5,100,000	1 July 2023	
MF	(Germany) Sebastian Rudy	Retired	N/A	1 July 2023	
FW	(Israel) Mu'nas Dabbur	(United Arab Emirates) Shabab Al-Ahli	€1,500,000	12 July 2023	
DF	(Brazil) Lucas Ribeiro	(Brazil) Ceará	Undisclosed	22 July 2023	
FW	(Denmark) Jacob Bruun Larsen	(England) Burnley	Loan	27 July 2023	
MF	(Germany) Angelo Stiller	(Germany) VfB Stuttgart	€5,500,000	25 August 2023	
MF	(Germany) Muhammed Damar	(Germany) Hannover 96	Loan	28 August 2023	
FW	(Germany) Fisnik Asllani	Austria Wien	Loan	31 August 2023	
DF	(Germany) Kevin Vogt	(Germany) Union Berlin	Undisclosed	11 January 2024	
MF	(Germany) Julian Justvan	(Germany) SV Darmstadt 98	Loan	19 January 2024	
DF	(Hungary) Attila Szalai	(Germany) SC Freiburg	Loan	21 January 2024	
DF	(Germany) Joshua Quarshie	(Germany) Fortuna Düsseldorf	Loan	29 January 2024	
MF	(Mali) Diadie Samassékou	(Spain) Cádiz	Loan	1 February 2024	

=== New contracts ===
Position	Player	Until	Ref.
GK	(Germany) Luca Philipp	June 2026	
DF	(Nigeria) Kevin Akpoguma	June 2026	

== Pre-season and friendlies ==
Win Draw Loss Fixtures

8 July 2023 Friendly	Astoria Walldorf	1–3	TSG Hoffenheim	Walldorf
14:00 CEST (UTC+2)	Fahrenholz 71'	Report	Prömel 29'; Vogt 67' (pen.); Kadeřábek 76'; Bischof (penalty missed) 84'	Stadium: Dietmar-Hopp-Sportpark

12 July 2023 Friendly	TSG Hoffenheim	1–2	SV Elversberg	Heilbronn
18:00 CEST (UTC+2)	Prömel 11'	Report	Şahin 15'; Feil 55'	Stadium: ERBE Arena

17 July 2023 Friendly	TSG Hoffenheim	1–2	Strasbourg	Kitzbühel, Austria
17:00 CEST (UTC+2)	Vogt 61' (pen.)	Report	Mothiba 7'; Deminguet (yellow card) 35'; Saettel 89'	Stadium: Sportplatz Langau

22 July 2023 Friendly	TSG Hoffenheim	4–2	Feyenoord	Austria
13:00 CEST (UTC+2)	Kadeřábek 6'; Kramarić 44'; Bruun Larsen 89'; Stiller 114'	Report	Milambo 73'; Danilo 79'	Attendance: 0
Note: Match was played in four halves of thirty minutes each.

29 July 2023 Friendly	TSG Hoffenheim	2–2	Rangers	Sinsheim
15:30 CEST (UTC+2)	Kadeřábek 23'; Bebou 42'	Report	Tavernier 57' (pen.); Lammers 63'	Stadium: Rhein-Neckar-Arena; Attendance: 11,500

5 August 2023 Friendly	Fulham	2–1	TSG Hoffenheim	Fulham, England
13:00 CEST (UTC+1)	Jiménez 51'; Bassey 73'	Report	Prömel 57'	Stadium: Craven Cottage

7 September 2023 Friendly	TSG Hoffenheim	3–1	Luzern	Hoffenheim
15:30 CEST (UTC+2)	Vogt 39' (pen.); Berisha 59'; Becker 65'	Report	Ademi 29'	Stadium: Dietmar-Hopp-Stadion

== Competitions ==
=== Overall record ===
Competition	First match	Last match	Starting round	Final position	Record							
Competition	First match	Last match	Starting round	Final position	Pld	W	D	L	GF	GA	GD	Win %
Bundesliga	19 August 2023	18 May 2024	Matchday 1	7th	34	13	7	14	66	66	+0	38.24
DFB-Pokal	14 August 2023	1 November 2023	First round	Second round	2	1	0	1	4	2	+2	50.00
Total					36	14	7	15	70	68	+2	38.89

Source: Soccerway

=== Bundesliga ===
==== League table ====
Pos	Team	Pld	W	D	L	GF	GA	GD	Pts	Qualification or relegation
5	Borussia Dortmund	34	18	9	7	68	43	+25	63	Qualification for the Champions League league phase (Note: The Bundesliga gained an additional Champions League place as a result of Germany finishing as one of the two associations with the highest UEFA coefficient points in 2023–24.)
6	Eintracht Frankfurt	34	11	14	9	51	50	+1	47	Qualification for the Europa League league phase (Note: Since the 2023–24 DFB-Pokal winners, Bayer Leverkusen, qualified for the Champions League via league position, the spot reserved for the DFB-Pokal winners (Europa League league phase) was passed to the seventh-placed team, and the Conference League play-off round spot was passed to the eighth-placed team.)
7	TSG Hoffenheim	34	13	7	14	66	66	0	46	Qualification for the Europa League league phase
8	1. FC Heidenheim	34	10	12	12	50	55	−5	42	Qualification for the Conference League play-off round
9	Werder Bremen	34	11	9	14	48	54	−6	42	

Source: DFB
Rules for classification: 1) Points; 2) Goal difference; 3) Goals scored; 4) Head-to-head results; 5) Head-to-head away goals scored; 6) Away goals scored; 7) Play-off.

==== Results summary ====
Overall								Home						Away					
Pld	W	D	L	GF	GA	GD	Pts	W	D	L	GF	GA	GD	W	D	L	GF	GA	GD
34	13	7	14	66	66	0	46	6	5	6	31	31	0	7	2	8	35	35	0

Source: DFB

==== Results by round ====
Round	1	2	3	4	5	6	7	8	9	10	11	12	13	14	15	16	17	18	19	20	21	22	23	24	25	26	27	28	29	30	31	32	33	34
Ground	H	A	H	A	A	H	A	H	A	H	A	H	A	H	A	H	A	A	H	A	H	H	A	H	A	H	A	H	A	H	A	H	A	H
Result	L	W	W	W	W	L	W	L	W	L	D	D	L	W	L	D	L	L	D	D	D	L	W	W	L	L	L	W	L	W	L	D	W	W
Position	12	10	6	5	5	6	5	6	6	6	6	6	6	6	7	7	8	8	8	8	8	9	7	7	7	8	9	8	9	9	9	8	7	7

Source: DFB
A = Away; H = Home; W = Win; D = Draw; L = Loss

==== Matches ====
The league fixtures were unveiled on 30 June 2023.

19 August 2023 1	TSG Hoffenheim	1–2	SC Freiburg	Sinsheim
15:30 CEST (UTC+2)	Kabak 50'	Report	Lienhart (yellow card) 15'; Szalai 39' (o.g.); Sallai 45+3'	Stadium: Rhein-Neckar-Arena; Attendance: 25,890; Referee: Sven Jablonski

26 August 2023 2	1. FC Heidenheim	2–3	TSG Hoffenheim	Heidenheim
15:30 CEST (UTC+2)	Beste (penalty missed) 16', 26'; Dinkçi (yellow card) 38'; Pieringer 58'	Report	Bülter (yellow card) 25'; Akpoguma (yellow card) 40'; Grillitsch (yellow card) 70'; Beier 77'; Kadeřábek 80', (yellow card) 82'; Kramarić 90' (pen.); Weghorst (yellow card) 90+5'	Stadium: Voith-Arena; Attendance: 15,000; Referee: Robert Hartmann

2 September 2023 3	TSG Hoffenheim	3–1	VfL Wolfsburg	Sinsheim
15:30 CEST (UTC+2)	Weghorst (yellow card) 10'; Bebou (yellow card) 25'; Brooks 45+2'; Beier 60'; Skov 74'	Report	Tomás 36'; Mæhle (yellow card) 43'; Svanberg (yellow card) 74'	Stadium: Rhein-Neckar-Arena; Attendance: 17,500; Referee: Felix Zwayer

16 September 2023 4	1. FC Köln	1–3	TSG Hoffenheim	Cologne
15:30 CEST (UTC+2)	Hübers (yellow card) 34'; Chabot (yellow card) 45+3'; Selke 61'; Carstensen (yellow card) 64' (yellow-red card) 90+1'	Report	Kramarić 1'; Skov (yellow card) 23'; Grillitsch 28', (yellow card) 75'; Beier 52'; Kadeřábek (yellow card) 68'; Brooks (yellow card) 69'	Stadium: RheinEnergieStadion; Attendance: 49,300; Referee: Daniel Siebert

23 September 2023 5	Union Berlin	0–2	TSG Hoffenheim	Berlin
15:30 CEST (UTC+2)	Tousart (yellow card) 72'	Report	Kramarić 22' (pen.), (yellow card) 45+5'; Beier 38'; Stach (yellow card) 54'; Becker (yellow card) 89'	Stadium: Stadion An der Alten Försterei; Attendance: 20,000; Referee: Deniz Aytekin

29 September 2023 6	TSG Hoffenheim	1–3	Borussia Dortmund	Sinsheim
20:30 CEST (UTC+2)	Kramarić 25' (pen.); Brooks (yellow card) 44'; Vogt (yellow card) 61'; Kabak (yellow card) 85'	Report	Füllkrug 18'; Hummels (yellow card) 23'; Reus 45+3', (yellow card) 87'; Nmecha (yellow card) 60'; Bensebaini (yellow card) 67' (yellow-red card) 71'; Ryerson 90+5'	Stadium: Rhein-Neckar-Arena; Attendance: 30,150; Referee: Florian Badstübner

7 October 2023 7	Werder Bremen	2–3	TSG Hoffenheim	Bremen
18:30 CEST (UTC+2)	Schmid 17'; Keïta (yellow card) 32'; Ducksch (yellow card) 45+1'; Weiser (yellow card) 56'; Rapp (yellow card) 58'; Stage 90+1'; Jung (yellow card) 90+2'	Report	Beier 8'; Prömel 29', (yellow card) 69'; Akpoguma (yellow card) 72'; Baumann (yellow card) 90'; Bülter 90+2'; Vogt (yellow card) 90+5'	Stadium: Weserstadion; Attendance: 41,000; Referee: Christian Dingert

21 October 2023 8	TSG Hoffenheim	1–3	Eintracht Frankfurt	Sinsheim
15:30 CEST (UTC+2)	Beier 3'; Grillitsch (yellow card) 41'; Prömel (yellow card) 51'; Szalai (yellow card) 60'	Report	Marmoush 11'; Knauff 23'; Skhiri 45+3'	Stadium: Rhein-Neckar-Arena; Attendance: 30,150; Referee: Matthias Jöllenbeck

28 October 2023 9	VfB Stuttgart	2–3	TSG Hoffenheim	Stuttgart
15:30 CEST (UTC+2)	Rouault (yellow card) 21'; Undav (penalty missed) 30', 74'; Führich 61', (yellow card) 80'	Report	Prömel 5'; Akpoguma (yellow card) 17'; Weghorst 21' (pen.); Skov 66'	Stadium: MHPArena; Attendance: 53,200; Referee: Felix Zwayer

4 November 2023 10	TSG Hoffenheim	2–3	Bayer Leverkusen	Sinsheim
15:30 CET (UTC+1)	Weghorst (yellow card) 45+3', (goal) 58'; Kabak (yellow card) 48'; Stach 56'; Prömel (yellow card) 60'	Report	Wirtz 9'; Grimaldo 45+1', 70'; Hradecky (yellow card) 72'; Tah (yellow card) 81'	Stadium: Rhein-Neckar-Arena; Attendance: 30,150; Referee: Frank Willenborg

11 November 2023 11	FC Augsburg	1–1	TSG Hoffenheim	Augsburg
15:30 CET (UTC+1)	Uduokhai (yellow card) 44'; Demirović 53'	Report	Weghorst 23'; Prömel (yellow card) 56'; Akpoguma (yellow card) 76'	Stadium: WWK Arena; Attendance: 28,260; Referee: Felix Brych

26 November 2023 12	TSG Hoffenheim	1–1	Mainz 05	Sinsheim
17:30 CET (UTC+1)	Kramarić (yellow card) 25'; Brooks (yellow card) 30'; Kabak (yellow card) 32'; Prömel (yellow card) 44'; Skov 48'	Report	Fernandes (yellow card) 25'; Caci (yellow card) 29'; Richter 39', (yellow card) 68'; Barkok (penalty missed) 68'; Mwene (yellow card) 90+1'	Stadium: Rhein-Neckar-Arena; Attendance: 22,000; Referee: Deniz Aytekin

2 December 2023 13	Borussia Mönchengladbach	2–1	TSG Hoffenheim	Mönchengladbach
15:30 CET (UTC+1)	Elvedi (yellow card) 54'; Pléa 58' (pen.); Ngoumou 80'; Reitz (yellow card) 82'	Report	Tohumcu (yellow card) 50'; Weghorst 60'; Akpoguma (yellow card) 88'	Stadium: Borussia-Park; Attendance: 49,341; Referee: Tobias Reichel

8 December 2023 14	TSG Hoffenheim	3–1	VfL Bochum	Sinsheim
20:30 CET (UTC+1)	Mašović 32' (o.g.); Tohumcu (yellow card) 41'; Kramarić 43', (yellow card) 51'; Prömel (yellow card) 53'; Bebou 76'	Report	Mašović (yellow card) 60'; Riemann (yellow card) 63'; Paciência 90'	Stadium: Rhein-Neckar-Arena; Attendance: 16,023; Referee: Matthias Jöllenbeck

16 December 2023 15	RB Leipzig	3–1	TSG Hoffenheim	Leipzig
18:30 CET (UTC+1)	Klostermann 34', (yellow card) 80'; Haidara (yellow card) 40'; Simons (yellow card) 62'; Forsberg 70'; Simakan 74'	Report	Kabak 42', (yellow card) 62'; Grillitsch (yellow card) 90+4'	Stadium: Red Bull Arena; Attendance: 42,946; Referee: Robert Schröder

19 December 2023 16	TSG Hoffenheim	3–3	Darmstadt 98	Sinsheim
20:30 CET (UTC+1)	Kramarić 14' (pen.); Bebou 28', 66', (yellow card) 72'; Skov (yellow card) 49'	Report	Gjasula (yellow card) 13'; Pfeiffer 23', (yellow card) 59'; Skarke 57', 85', (yellow card) 75'; Riedel (yellow card) 81'	Stadium: Rhein-Neckar-Arena; Attendance: 18,125; Referee: Frank Willenborg

12 January 2024 17	Bayern Munich	3–0	TSG Hoffenheim	Munich
20:30 CET (UTC+1)	Musiala 18', 70'; Pavlović (yellow card) 83'; Kane 90'	Report	Stach (yellow card) 16'; Prömel (yellow card) 42' (yellow-red card) 74'	Stadium: Allianz Arena; Attendance: 75,000; Referee: Benjamin Brand

20 January 2024 18	SC Freiburg	3–2	TSG Hoffenheim	Freiburg
15:30 CET (UTC+1)	Höler 36'; Gulde (yellow card) 43' (yellow-red card) 82'; Grifo 55', (yellow card) 56'; Sallai 85'	Report	Kadeřábek (yellow card) 8'; Kabak (yellow card) 31'; Weghorst 57'; Beier 77'	Stadium: Europa-Park Stadion; Attendance: 33,600; Referee: Sascha Stegemann

27 January 2024 19	TSG Hoffenheim	1–1	1. FC Heidenheim	Sinsheim
15:30 CET (UTC+1)	Kramarić 45+7' (pen.); Stach (yellow card) 59'; Akpoguma (yellow card) 72'; Brooks (yellow card) 89'; Grillitsch (yellow card) 90+5'	Report	Dinkçi 29'	Stadium: Rhein-Neckar-Arena; Attendance: 20,120; Referee: Tobias Welz

4 February 2024 20	VfL Wolfsburg	2–2	TSG Hoffenheim	Wolfsburg
15:30 CET (UTC+1)	Majer 58', 70' (pen.), (yellow card) 90+6'; Jenz (yellow card) 90+2'	Report	Beier 6'; Kabak (yellow card) 57'; Prömel 66'; Nsoki (yellow card) 69'; Brooks (yellow card) 90+2'	Stadium: Volkswagen Arena; Attendance: 22,917; Referee: Florian Badstübner

11 February 2024 21	TSG Hoffenheim	1–1	1. FC Köln	Sinsheim
17:30 CET (UTC+1)	Bebou (yellow card) 32'; Stach (yellow card) 78'; Grillitsch (yellow card) 81'; Kramarić 90+4'	Report	Schmitz (yellow card) 55'; Maina (yellow card) 76'; Chabot (yellow card) 76'; Finkgräfe 79', (yellow card) 84'	Stadium: Rhein-Neckar-Arena; Attendance: 23,020; Referee: Christian Dingert

17 February 2024 22	TSG Hoffenheim	0–1	Union Berlin	Sinsheim
15:30 CET (UTC+1)	Nsoki (yellow card) 45' (yellow-red card) 45+3'; Kadeřábek (yellow card) 86'	Report	Volland (yellow card) 45' (yellow-red card) 45+6'; Doekhi (yellow card) 45+9'; Aaronson 84'; Leite (yellow card) 89'	Stadium: Rhein-Neckar-Arena; Attendance: 19,050; Referee: Robert Hartmann

25 February 2024 23	Borussia Dortmund	2–3	TSG Hoffenheim	Dortmund
17:30 CET (UTC+1)	Malen 21', (yellow card) 90+5'; Schlotterbeck 25'; Sabitzer (yellow card) 45'	Report	Bebou 2'; Tohumcu (yellow card) 24'; Beier 61', 64'; Brooks (yellow card) 90+3'; Geiger (yellow card) 90+4'	Stadium: Signal Iduna Park; Attendance: 81,365; Referee: Marco Fritz

3 March 2024 24	TSG Hoffenheim	2–1	Werder Bremen	Hoffenheim
16:30 CET (UTC+1)	Beier 8', 44'; Grillitsch (yellow card) 49'; Stach (yellow card) 51'; Bülter (yellow card) 61' (yellow-red card) 73'; Kadeřábek (yellow card) 78'	Report	Deman (yellow card) 85'; Alvero 90+2'	Stadium: Rhein-Neckar-Arena; Attendance: 25,000; Referee: Matthias Jöllenbeck

10 March 2024 25	Eintracht Frankfurt	3–1	TSG Hoffenheim	Frankfurt
17:30 CET (UTC+1)	Chaïbi (yellow card) 12'; Koch 32'; Dina Ebimbe 50'; Götze 64'	Report	Brooks 6', (red card) 22'; Kabak (red card) 9'; Akpoguma (yellow card) 57'	Stadium: Deutsche Bank Park; Attendance: 57,000; Referee: Bastian Dankert

16 March 2024 26	TSG Hoffenheim	0–3	VfB Stuttgart	Sinsheim
18:30 CET (UTC+1)	Kadeřábek (yellow card) 45+3'	Report	Millot 16'; Guirassy 45+1'; Leweling 68'	Stadium: Rhein-Neckar-Arena; Attendance: 30,150; Referee: Sascha Stegemann

30 March 2024 27	Bayer Leverkusen	2–1	TSG Hoffenheim	Leverkusen
15:30 CET (UTC+1)	Andrich 88'; Schick 90+1'	Report	Drexler (yellow card) 19'; Beier 33'	Stadium: BayArena; Attendance: 30,210; Referee: Deniz Aytekin

7 April 2024 28	TSG Hoffenheim	3–1	FC Augsburg	Sinsheim
15:30 CEST (UTC+2)	Weghorst 17', (yellow card) 88'; Kramarić 20'; Jurásek (yellow card) 41'; Kadeřábek (yellow card) 51'; Bebou 90'	Report	Tietz (yellow card) 38'; Demirović 61'	Stadium: Rhein-Neckar-Arena; Attendance: 28,881; Referee: Florian Exner

13 April 2024 29	Mainz 05	4–1	TSG Hoffenheim	Mainz
15:30 CEST (UTC+2)	Burkardt 47'; Mwene 51'; Gruda 63'; Onisiwo 88'	Report	Kadeřábek 19'; Prömel (yellow card) 39'; Kabak (yellow card) 83'	Stadium: Mewa Arena; Attendance: 31,000; Referee: Felix Zwayer

20 April 2024 30	TSG Hoffenheim	4–3	Borussia Mönchengladbach	Sinsheim
15:30 CEST (UTC+2)	Weghorst 36'; Kabak (yellow card) 49', (goal) 66'; Prömel 58'; Stach 90+1'	Report	Hack 39', 78', 89'; Itakura (yellow card) 75'; Čvančara (yellow card) 82'; Weigl (yellow card) 82'	Stadium: Rhein-Neckar-Arena; Attendance: 26,078; Referee: Sören Storks

26 April 2024 31	VfL Bochum	3–2	TSG Hoffenheim	Bochum
20:30 CEST (UTC+2)	Losilla (yellow card) 31'; Stöger 34', 64'; Passlack 45+2'	Report	Tohumcu (yellow card) 33'; Kramarić 73', 84'	Stadium: Vonovia Ruhrstadion; Attendance: 24,300; Referee: Tobias Stieler

3 May 2024 32	TSG Hoffenheim	1–1	RB Leipzig	Sinsheim
20:30 CEST (UTC+2)	Kabak (yellow card) 69'; Kramarić 90'	Report	Šeško 38'; Simons (yellow card) 55' (yellow-red card) 72'; Raum (yellow card) 86'	Stadium: Rhein-Neckar-Arena; Attendance: 25,066; Referee: Harm Osmers

12 May 2024 33	Darmstadt 98	0–6	TSG Hoffenheim	Darmstadt
15:30 CEST (UTC+2)	Müller (yellow card) 53'; Skarke (yellow card) 68'; Gjasula (yellow card) 75'	Report	Bebou 2', 51'; Beier 6', 44'; Kadeřábek 22'; Kabak 26'	Stadium: Merck-Stadion am Böllenfalltor; Attendance: 17,810; Referee: Florian Badstübner

18 May 2024 34	TSG Hoffenheim	4–2	Bayern Munich	Sinsheim
15:30 CEST (UTC+2)	Beier 8'; Prömel (yellow card) 51'; Grillitsch (yellow card) 54'; Kramarić 68', 85', 87', (yellow card) 88'	Report	Tel 4'; Davies 6'; Zaragoza (yellow card) 90+4'	Stadium: Rhein-Neckar-Arena; Attendance: 30,150; Referee: Marco Fritz

=== DFB-Pokal ===
14 August 2023 First round	VfB Lübeck	1–4	TSG Hoffenheim	Lübeck
18:00 CEST (UTC+2)	Gözüsirin 34' (pen.)	Report	Kramarić 42', 60' (pen.); Bülter 69'; Justvan 76'; Becker (yellow card) 86'	Stadium: Stadion an der Lohmühle; Attendance: 13,000; Referee: Florian Lechner

1 November 2023 Second round	Borussia Dortmund	1–0	TSG Hoffenheim	Dortmund
18:00 CET (UTC+1)	Reus 43'; Schlotterbeck (yellow card) 56'	Report	Kabak (yellow card) 66' (yellow-red card) 90+4'; Weghorst (yellow card) 75'	Stadium: Signal Iduna Park; Attendance: 81,365; Referee: Harm Osmers

== Statistics ==
=== Appearances and goals ===
No.	Pos	Nat	Player	Total		Bundesliga		DFB-Pokal	
No.	Pos	Nat	Player	Apps	Goals	Apps	Goals	Apps	Goals
Goalkeepers
1	GK	(Germany) GER	Oliver Baumann	23	0	21	0	2	0
36	GK	(Germany) GER	Nahuel Noel	0	0	0	0	0	0
37	GK	(Germany) GER	Luca Philipp	0	0	0	0	0	0
Defenders
3	DF	(Czech Republic) CZE	Pavel Kadeřábek	18	1	16+1	1	1	0
5	DF	(Turkey) TUR	Ozan Kabak	18	2	16	2	1+1	0
15	DF	(Ghana) GHA	Kasim Nuhu	0	0	0	0	0	0
19	DF	(Czech Republic) CZE	David Jurásek	1	0	0+1	0	0	0
23	DF	(United States) USA	John Brooks	17	1	15	1	2	0
25	DF	(Nigeria) NGR	Kevin Akpoguma	13	0	6+6	0	1	0
34	DF	(France) FRA	Stanley Nsoki	7	0	5+2	0	0	0
Midfielders
6	MF	(Germany) GER	Grischa Prömel	21	3	19	3	2	0
8	MF	(Germany) GER	Dennis Geiger	0	0	0	0	0	0
11	MF	(Austria) AUT	Florian Grillitsch	18	1	12+5	1	1	0
16	MF	(Germany) GER	Anton Stach	19	1	15+3	1	1	0
20	MF	(Germany) GER	Finn Ole Becker	15	0	4+10	0	0+1	0
24	MF	(Germany) GER	Marco John	0	0	0	0	0	0
31	MF	(Germany) GER	Bambasé Conté	5	0	0+4	0	0+1	0
39	MF	(Germany) GER	Tom Bischof	11	0	1+9	0	0+1	0
40	MF	(Germany) GER	Umut Tohumcu	10	0	4+5	0	0+1	0
Forwards
7	FW	(Germany) GER	Mërgim Berisha	7	0	0+6	0	1	0
9	FW	(Togo) TOG	Ihlas Bebou	21	3	8+11	3	1+1	0
10	FW	(Netherlands) NED	Wout Weghorst	19	5	17	5	2	0
14	FW	(Germany) GER	Maximilian Beier	22	8	15+5	8	1+1	0
21	FW	(Germany) GER	Marius Bülter	22	2	11+9	1	2	1
27	FW	(Croatia) CRO	Andrej Kramarić	19	10	14+4	8	1	2
29	FW	(Denmark) DEN	Robert Skov	19	3	11+8	3	0	0
Players transferred out during the season
13	MF	(Germany) GER	Angelo Stiller	2	0	1	0	1	0
17	MF	(Germany) GER	Julian Justvan	5	1	0+4	0	0+1	1
18	MF	(Mali) MLI	Diadie Samassékou	1	0	0+1	0	0	0
22	DF	(Germany) GER	Kevin Vogt	18	0	14+2	0	2	0
35	MF	(Germany) GER	Muhammed Damar	0	0	0	0	0	0
41	DF	(Hungary) HUN	Attila Szalai	5	0	4	0	0+1	0
44	FW	(Germany) GER	Fisnik Asllani	0	0	0	0	0	0
48	DF	(Germany) GER	Joshua Quarshie	0	0	0	0	0	0

Last updated: 11 February 2024
Source: Competitions

=== Goalscorers ===
As of 2 March 2024

Rank	Pos	No.	Nat	Name	Bundesliga	DFB-Pokal	Total
1	FW	14	(Germany)	Maximilian Beier	12	0	12
2	FW	27	(Croatia)	Andrej Kramarić	8	2	10
3	FW	10	(Netherlands)	Wout Weghorst	5	0	5
4	FW	9	(Togo)	Ihlas Bebou	4	0	4
5	FW	29	(Denmark)	Robert Skov	3	0	3
5	MF	6	(Germany)	Grischa Prömel	3	0	3
7	DF	5	(Turkey)	Ozan Kabak	2	0	2
7	FW	21	(Germany)	Marius Bülter	1	1	2
9	DF	3	(Czech Republic)	Pavel Kadeřábek	1	0	1
9	MF	11	(Austria)	Florian Grillitsch	1	0	1
9	MF	17	(Germany)	Julian Justvan	0	1	1
9	DF	23	(United States)	John Brooks	1	0	1
9	MF	16	(Germany)	Anton Stach	1	0	1
Own goals					1	0	0
Totals					43	4	47
