= Paul Scholl =

German footballer (born 2006)

Personal information
- Date of birth: 23 July 2006 (age 20)
- Place of birth: Hausham, Germany
- Height: 1.93 m (6 ft 4 in)
- Position: Centre-back

Team information
- Current team: Karlsruher SC
- Number: 15

Youth career
- 2014–2025: Bayern Munich

Senior career*
Years	Team	Apps	(Gls)
2024–2026	Bayern Munich II	16	(0)
2025–2026	→ Karlsruher SC (loan)	13	(0)
2025–2026	→ Karlsruher SC II (loan)	10	(0)
2026–	Karlsruher SC	5	(0)

International career^{‡}
2021–2022	Germany U16	6	(0)
2022–2023	Germany U17	5	(0)
- * Club domestic league appearances and goals as of 31 October 2026 ‡ National team caps and goals as of 14 January 2023

Paul Scholl (born 23 July 2006) is a German professional footballer who plays as a centre-back for 2. Bundesliga club Karlsruher SC. He is a former German youth international.

== Club career ==
=== Bayern Munich ===
Scholl is a youth product of Bundesliga side Bayern Munich, progressing from 2014 until 2025, he was promoted to Bayern Munich's reserve team for the 2024–25 season.

==== Loan to Karlsruher SC ====
In 2025, Scholl signed an extension contract with Bayern Munich until 2027, and subsequently moved to 2. Bundesliga club Karlsruher SC on a one-year loan for the 2025–26 season.

=== Karlsruher SC ===
On 19 May 2026, he joined Karlsruher SC permanently, ahead of the 2026–27 season.

== International career ==
Scholl has represented Germany at the under-16 and under-17 levels.

== Career statistics ==
=== Club ===
As of 17 May 2026

Appearances and goals by club, season and competition
Club	Season	League			National cup		Other		Total	
Club	Season	Division	Apps	Goals	Apps	Goals	Apps	Goals	Apps	Goals
Bayern Munich II	2024–25	Regionalliga Bayern	16	0	—		—		16	0
Bayern Munich II	Total		16	0	—		—		16	0
Karlsruher SC (loan)	2025–26	2. Bundesliga	13	0	0	0	—		13	0
Karlsruher SC II (loan)	2025–26	Oberliga Baden-Württemberg	10	0	—		—		10	0
Career total			39	0	0	0	0	0	39	0
