= Andrea Arrighini =

Italian footballer (born 1990)

Personal information
- Date of birth: 6 June 1990 (age 36)
- Place of birth: Pisa, Italy
- Height: 1.83 m (6 ft 0 in)
- Position: Forward

Team information
- Current team: Virtus Francavilla
- Number: 11

Senior career*
Years	Team	Apps	(Gls)
2006–2007	Lumezzane	3	(0)
2007–2014	Pontedera	154	(47)
2010–2011	→ Rosignano (loan)	32	(9)
2014–2017	Avellino	17	(1)
2015	→ Pisa (loan)	17	(2)
2015–2016	→ Cosenza (loan)	34	(9)
2016–2018	→ Cittadella (loan)	60	(12)
2018–2019	Carpi	34	(4)
2019–2022	Alessandria	73	(15)
2022–2023	Reggiana	14	(3)
2022–2023	→ Pro Vercelli (loan)	36	(2)
2023–2024	AlbinoLeffe	32	(3)
2024–	Virtus Francavilla	10	(1)
- * Club domestic league appearances and goals as of 17 November 2024

Andrea Arrighini (born 6 June 1990) is an Italian footballer who plays for Serie D club Virtus Francavilla.

== Biography ==
Born in Pisa, Tuscany, Arrighini had played three times for Lombard club Lumezzane in 2006–07 Serie C2. In 2007 Arrighini returned to Tuscany for Serie D club Pontedera.

He followed the club promoted to 2012–13 Lega Pro Seconda Divisione. He scored 17 times for the Group B runner-up. In 2013–14 Lega Pro Prima Divisione, he scored 15 times.

=== Avellino ===
On 27 June 2014, Arrighini signed a four-year contract with Serie B club Avellino. On 11 January 2015, Arrighini was farmed to Lega Pro club Pisa in temporary deal, with an option to purchase.

On 9 July Arrighini was signed by another third division club Cosenza in the same formula.

=== Alessandria ===
On 28 July 2019, he signed a three-year contract with Alessandria.

=== Reggiana ===
On 26 January 2022, he moved to Reggiana. On 1 September 2022, Arrighini was loaned by Pro Vercelli.

=== AlbinoLeffe ===
On 1 September 2023, Arrighini signed a one-season contract with AlbinoLeffe.
