= Kristian Mandić =

Croatian footballer

Personal information
- Full name: Kristian Mandić
- Date of birth: 2 October 2007 (age 19)
- Place of birth: Frankfurt, Germany
- Height: 1.86 m (6 ft 1 in)
- Position: Defender

Team information
- Current team: 1. FC Nürnberg
- Number: 36

Youth career
- –2022: FSV Frankfurt
- 2022–2025: Eintracht Frankfurt

Senior career*
| Years | Team | Apps | (Gls) |
| 2025–2026 | 1. FC Nürnberg II | 23 | (0) |
| 2026– | 1. FC Nürnberg | 1 | (0) |

International career^{‡}
| 2024 | Croatia U17 | 8 | (1) |
| 2024–2025 | Croatia U18 | 7 | (1) |
| 2025– | Croatia U19 | 20 | (0) |
- * Club domestic league appearances and goals as of 07:03, 30 August 2026 (UTC) ‡ National team caps and goals as of 07:03, 30 August 2026 (UTC)

Kristian Mandić (born 2 October 2007) is a Croatian professional footballer who plays as a defender for 2. Bundesliga club 1. FC Nürnberg.

== Club career ==
Born in Frankfurt, Germany, Mandić started his youth career with the academy of local Eintracht Frankfurt, staying there for three seasons and making 57 appearances for all the youth competitions. On 16 June 2025, it was announced that, he will be joining 1. FC Nürnberg for the upcoming season. On 30 August 2026, he made his 2. Bundesliga debut, playing the entire 90 minutes of a 4–1 victory over Arminia Bielefeld.

== International career ==
Mandić has represented Croatia in the youth international levels.

== Career statistics ==
=== Club ===
As of match played 30 August 2026

Appearances and goals by club, season and competition
| Club | Season | League | | | Cup | | Continental | | Other | | Total | |
| Club | Season | Division | Apps | Goals | Apps | Goals | Apps | Goals | Apps | Goals | Apps | Goals |
|---|---|---|---|---|---|---|---|---|---|---|---|---|
| 1. FC Nürnberg | 2026–27 | 2. Bundesliga | 1 | 0 | 1 | 0 | — | | — | | 2 | 0 |
| 1. FC Nürnberg | Total | | 1 | 0 | 1 | 0 | — | | — | | 2 | 0 |
| Career total | | | 1 | 0 | 1 | 0 | 0 | 0 | 0 | 0 | 2 | 0 |
