= Fynn Otto =

German footballer

Personal information
- Date of birth: 8 March 2002 (age 24)
- Place of birth: Giessen, Germany
- Height: 1.92 m (6 ft 4 in)
- Positions: Centre-back; defensive midfielder

Team information
- Current team: 1. FC Nürnberg
- Number: 20

Youth career
- TSV Ostheim
- –2014: SV Nieder-Weisel
- 2014–2021: Eintracht Frankfurt

Senior career*
Years	Team	Apps	(Gls)
2021–2022	Eintracht Frankfurt	0	(0)
2021–2022	→ Hallescher FC (loan)	10	(0)
2022–2024	Eintracht Frankfurt II	48	(2)
2024–2026	SC Verl	53	(1)
2026–	1. FC Nürnberg	0	(0)

International career^{‡}
2017–2018	Germany U16	9	(1)
- * Club domestic league appearances and goals as of 28 May 2026 ‡ National team caps and goals as of 20:02, 11 October 2021 (UTC)

Fynn Otto (born 8 March 2002) is a German professional footballer who plays as a centre-back or defensive midfielder for 2. Bundesliga club 1. FC Nürnberg.

== Early life and education ==
Born in Giessen, Otto was educated at the Burggymnasium in Friedberg in der Wetterau.

== Club career ==
Otto played youth football for TSV Ostheim and SV Nieder-Weisel before joining Eintracht Frankfurt's youth academy in 2014. In January 2020, Otto signed a three-year professional contract with the club, active from summer 2020. On 4 August 2021, it was announced that Otto had joined 3. Liga club Hallescher FC on a season-long loan.

On 8 May 2024, Otto signed with SC Verl in 3. Liga for the 2024–25 season.

On 5 May 2026, Otto moved to 1. FC Nürnberg in 2. Bundesliga.

== International career ==
Otto made nine appearances for Germany at under-16 level, scoring one goal. He was later called up for the under-18 team, but withdrew through injury.

== Style of play ==
Otto can play as a centre-back or as a defensive midfielder.
