= Tim Drexler =

German footballer (born 2005)

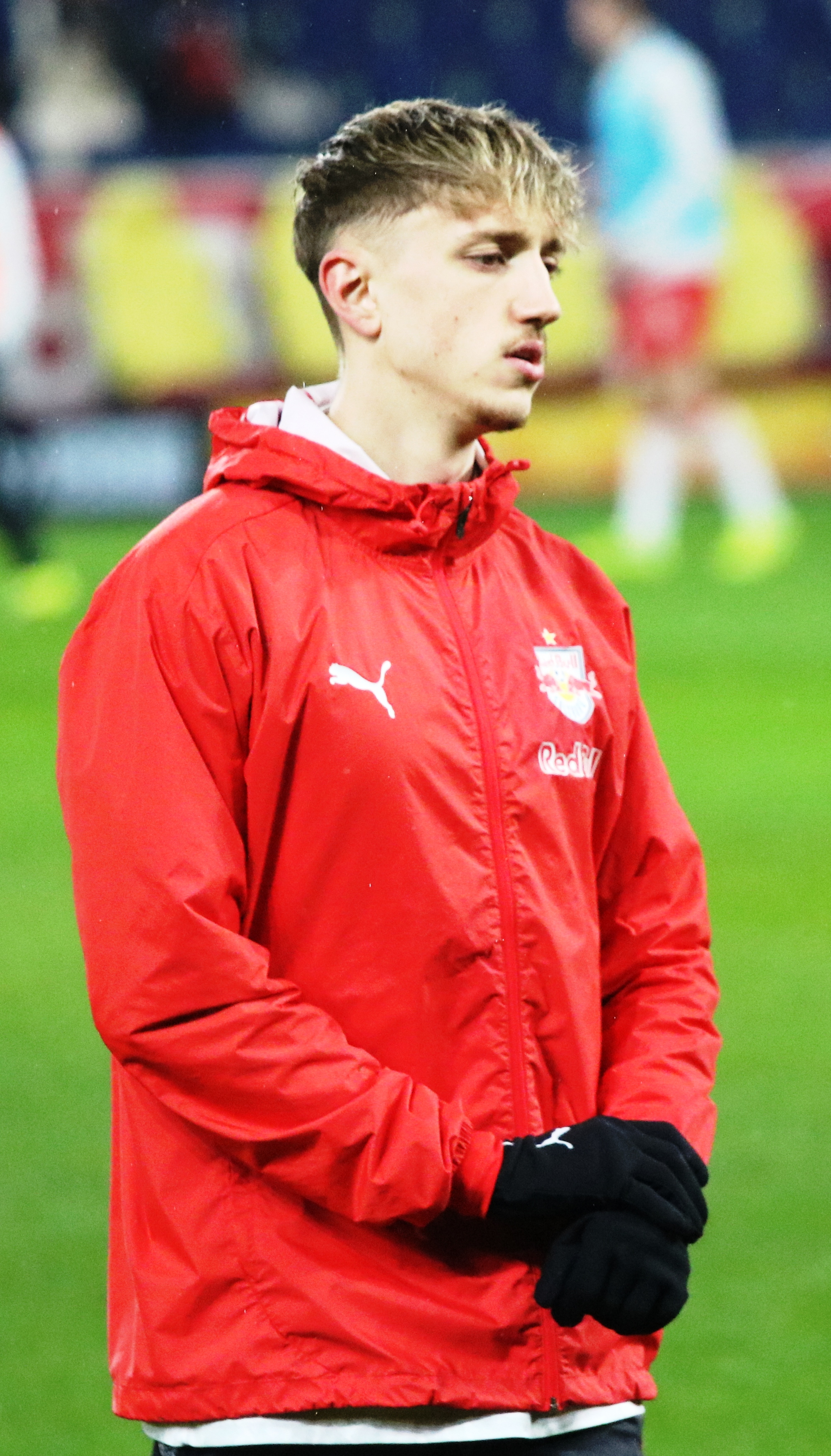
- Drexler in 2026

Personal information
- Date of birth: 6 March 2005 (age 21)
- Place of birth: Bruchsal, Germany
- Height: 1.86 m (6 ft 1 in)
- Position: Defender

Team information
- Current team: Red Bull Salzburg
- Number: 21

Youth career
- –2016: FzG Münzesheim
- 2016–2023: TSG Hoffenheim

Senior career*
Years	Team	Apps	(Gls)
2022–2024	TSG Hoffenheim II	24	(1)
2024–2026	TSG Hoffenheim	16	(0)
2025	→ 1. FC Nürnberg (loan)	14	(1)
2025–2026	→ 1. FC Nürnberg (loan)	13	(0)
2026–	Red Bull Salzburg	19	(0)

International career^{‡}
2020	Germany U16	1	(0)
2021–2022	Germany U17	6	(1)
2022	Germany U18	3	(0)
2023–2024	Germany U19	6	(0)
2024–2025	Germany U20	5	(0)
2025–	Germany U21	1	(0)
- * Club domestic league appearances and goals as of 25 October 2026 ‡ National team caps and goals as of 15:17, 15 October 2025 (UTC)

Tim Drexler (born 6 March 2005) is a German professional footballer who plays as a defender for Austrian Bundesliga club Red Bull Salzburg.

== Club career ==
Drexler began to play football at a young age for local team FzG Münzesheim, before signing for TSG Hoffenheim in 2016.

=== TSG Hoffenheim ===
Drexler played for Hoffenheim's youth teams until he made his debut for Hoffenheim II in 2022, coming on as a substitute in a 1–0 win against Astoria Walldorf. He made 5 further appearances for the reserve team that season. The following season, Drexler became a more regular starter for the reserve team, making 15 appearances and scoring a goal in a 4–0 win over TSG Balingen.

Drexler joined the first team in March 2024, making his first appearance for them in a 3–1 loss to Eintracht Frankfurt, coming on as a 72nd-minute substitute for Anton Stach. Drexler went on to make 8 Bundesliga appearances that season, before signing a new long-term contract in July 2024.

On 9 January 2025, Drexler moved on loan to 1. FC Nürnberg in 2. Bundesliga for the rest of the season.

On 31 August 2025, Drexler returned to 1. FC Nürnberg on a new season-long loan.

=== Red Bull Salzburg ===
On 31 January 2026, Drexler joined Red Bull Salzburg in Austria on a two-and-a-half-year contract.

== International career ==
Drexler has represented Germany at multiple levels, starting from the under-16s.

== Career statistics ==
As of match played 28 October 2026

Appearances and goals by club, season and competition
Club	Season	League			National cup (Note: Includes DFB-Pokal, Austrian Cup)		Continental		Other		Total	
Club	Season	Division	Apps	Goals	Apps	Goals	Apps	Goals	Apps	Goals	Apps	Goals
1899 Hoffenheim II	2022–23	Regionalliga Südwest	6	0	—		—		—		6	0
1899 Hoffenheim II	2023–24	Regionalliga Südwest	18	1	—		—		—		18	1
1899 Hoffenheim II	Total		24	1	0	0	0	0	0	0	24	1
1899 Hoffenheim	2023–24	Bundesliga	8	0	0	0	0	0	0	0	8	0
1899 Hoffenheim	2024–25	Bundesliga	8	0	2	0	3 (Note: Appearances in the UEFA Europa League)	0	0	0	13	0
1899 Hoffenheim	Total		16	0	2	0	3	0	0	0	21	0
1. FC Nürnberg (loan)	2024–25	2. Bundesliga	14	1	0	0	0	0	0	0	14	1
1. FC Nürnberg (loan)	2025–26	2. Bundesliga	13	0	—		—		—		13	0
Red Bull Salzburg	2025–26	Austrian Bundesliga	13	0	1	0	—		—		14	0
Red Bull Salzburg	2026–27	Austrian Bundesliga	6	0	2	0	4	0	—		12	0
Red Bull Salzburg	Total		19	0	3	0	4	0	—		26	0
Career total			86	2	5	0	7	0	0	0	98	2
