= Fabio Gruber =

Peruvian footballer (born 2002)

Personal information
- Full name: Fabio Gruber Betalleluz
- Date of birth: 3 September 2002 (age 24)
- Place of birth: Augsburg, Germany
- Height: 1.88 m (6 ft 2 in)
- Position: Centre-back

Team information
- Current team: Mainz 05
- Number: 3

Youth career
- –2021: FC Augsburg

Senior career*
Years	Team	Apps	(Gls)
2021–2023	FC Augsburg II	62	(6)
2023–2025	SC Verl	39	(2)
2025–2026	FC Nürnberg	41	(2)
2026–	Mainz 05	5	(0)

International career^{‡}
2025–	Peru	6	(0)
- * Club domestic league appearances and goals as of 10 October 2026 ‡ National team caps and goals as of 22:46, 14 November 2026 (UTC)

Fabio Gruber (born 3 September 2002) is a professional footballer who plays as a centre-back for Bundesliga club Mainz 05, he plays for the Peru national team.

== Early life ==
Gruber was born on 3 September 2002. Born in Augsburg, Germany, he is a native of the city.

== Club career ==
As a youth player, Gruber joined the youth academy of Bundesliga club FC Augsburg and was promoted to the club's reserve team ahead of the 2021–22 season, where he made sixty-two league appearances and scored six goals.

During the summer of 2023, he signed for 3. Liga side SC Verl, where he made 39 league appearances and scored two goals. Following his stint there, he moved for 2. Bundesliga club 1. FC Nürnberg in 2025.

On 12 June 2026, Gruber signed with Bundesliga club Mainz 05.

== International career ==
Gruber was born in Germany to a German father and Peruvian mother. In November 2025, he was called up to the Peru national team for a set of friendlies.

== Style of play ==
Gruber plays as a central defender and is right-footed. German journalist Uli Digmayer said in 2025 that he "is very talented and intelligent, very calm with the ball, relatively quick for a centre-back , has good passing skills and is especially strong in the air".

== Career statistics ==
=== Club ===
As of match played 10 October 2026

Appearances and goals by club, season and competition
Club	Season	League			DFB-Pokal		Europe		Other		Total	
Club	Season	Division	Apps	Goals	Apps	Goals	Apps	Goals	Apps	Goals	Apps	Goals
FC Augsburg II	2021–22	Regionalliga Bayern	33	1	—		—		—		33	1
FC Augsburg II	2022–23	Regionalliga Bayern	29	5	—		—		—		29	5
FC Augsburg II	Total		62	6	—		—		—		62	6
SC Verl	2023–24	3. Liga	18	0	—		—		5 (Note: Appearances in Westphalian Cup)	0	23	0
SC Verl	2024–25	3. Liga	21	2	—		—		2	0	23	2
SC Verl	Total		39	2	—		—		7	0	46	2
1. FC Nürnberg	2024–25	2. Bundesliga	9	1	—		—		—		9	1
1. FC Nürnberg	2025–26	2. Bundesliga	32	1	1	0	—		—		33	1
1. FC Nürnberg	Total		41	2	1	0	—		—		42	2
Mainz 05	2026–27	Bundesliga	5	0	1	0	—		—		6	0
Career total			146	10	2	0	0	0	7	0	155	10

=== International ===
As of match played 13 November 2026

Appearances and goals by national team and year
National team	Year	Apps	Goals
Peru	2026	6	0
Total		6	0
