= Finn Ole Becker =

German footballer (born 2000)

Personal information
- Date of birth: 8 June 2000 (age 26)
- Place of birth: Elmshorn, Germany
- Height: 1.77 m (5 ft 10 in)
- Positions: Central midfielder; right-back

Team information
- Current team: 1. FC Nürnberg
- Number: 25

Youth career
- TSV Sparrieshoop
- –2011: Holsatia Elmshorn
- 2011–2019: FC St. Pauli

Senior career*
Years	Team	Apps	(Gls)
2019–2022	FC St. Pauli	84	(4)
2022	→ FC St. Pauli II	1	(0)
2022–2024	TSG Hoffenheim II	8	(1)
2022–2025	TSG Hoffenheim	48	(0)
2025–	1. FC Nürnberg	30	(3)

International career^{‡}
2017	Germany U18	3	(0)
2018–2019	Germany U19	3	(0)
2019	Germany U20	4	(0)
2021–2023	Germany U21	4	(0)
- * Club domestic league appearances and goals as of 18 May 2026 ‡ National team caps and goals as of 19:15, 28 June 2023 (UTC)

Finn Ole Becker (born 8 June 2000) is a German professional footballer who plays as a central midfielder or right-back for 2. Bundesliga club 1. FC Nürnberg.

== Early life ==
Becker attended the Bismarckschule in Elmshorn for high school, where he graduated in 2018.

He has two sisters and a brother.

== Club career ==
=== Early career ===
Becker began playing football at TSV Sparrieshoop, for whom his father Dirk Becker had once played in the Landesliga. Until 30 June 2011, he was a player at Holsatia Elmshorn, where Bruno Harnau, who worked there as youth coordinator, introduced him to FC St. Pauli. He subsequently moved to St. Pauli on 1 July 2011 at the age of eleven.

In the 2015–16 season, Becker made 15 appearances in the Under 17 Bundesliga North/Northeast, providing an assist. He played in the Under 19 Bundesliga for the next two seasons, making 37 appearances in which he scored four goals and assisted two. In his final season for the St. Pauli under-19 team, Becker finished with 20 games, two goals and one assist.

=== FC St. Pauli ===
Becker made his professional debut for FC St. Pauli in the 2. Bundesliga under head coach Jos Luhukay on 14 April 2019, coming on as a substitute in the 87th minute for Ryō Miyaichi in the 1–1 home draw against Arminia Bielefeld. He thereby became the first player born in 2000 to make an appearance for the club. In his second game on 21 April against 1. FC Heidenheim, he came on for Christopher Buchtmann in the 45th minute, but was sent off in the 72nd minute after receiving his second yellow card. Becker made his first ever start on 3 May in the away game against Dynamo Dresden.

=== TSG Hoffenheim ===
As his contract with St. Pauli was set to expire, it was announced on 29 January 2022 that Becker would join Bundesliga club TSG Hoffenheim as a free agent from the 2022–23 season. He signed a four-year contract.

=== 1. FC Nürnberg ===
On 27 August 2025, Becker signed with 1. FC Nürnberg in 2. Bundesliga.

== International career ==
On 12 November 2017, Becker made his debut for the Germany U18 team under coach Guido Streichsbier at the age of 17 in a friendly match. He was in the starting lineup in a 3–1 win against Italy team and was substituted for Nick Bätzner in the 70th minute of the game.

== Career statistics ==
As of match played 26 April 2026

Appearances and goals by club, season and competition
Club	Season	League			DFB-Pokal		Continental		Other		Total	
Club	Season	Division	Apps	Goals	Apps	Goals	Apps	Goals	Apps	Goals	Apps	Goals
St. Pauli	2018–19	2. Bundesliga	5	0	0	0	—		0	0	5	0
St. Pauli	2019–20	2. Bundesliga	28	1	1	0	—		—		29	1
St. Pauli	2020–21	2. Bundesliga	30	1	0	0	—		—		30	1
St. Pauli	2021–22	2. Bundesliga	21	2	3	0	—		—		24	2
St. Pauli	Total		84	4	4	0	—		0	0	88	4
St. Pauli II	2021–22	Regionalliga Nord	2	0	—		—		—		2	0
1899 Hoffenheim	2022–23	Bundesliga	13	0	1	0	—		—		14	0
1899 Hoffenheim	2023–24	Bundesliga	22	0	1	0	—		—		23	0
1899 Hoffenheim	2024–25	Bundesliga	13	0	0	0	2 (Note: Appearances in UEFA Europa League)	0	—		15	0
1899 Hoffenheim	Total		48	0	2	0	2	0	0	0	52	0
1899 Hoffenheim II	2022–23	Regionalliga Südwest	7	1	—		—		—		7	1
1899 Hoffenheim II	2024–25	Regionalliga Südwest	1	0	—		—		—		1	0
1899 Hoffenheim II	Total		8	1	0	0	0	0	0	0	8	1
1. FC Nürnberg	2025–26	2. Bundesliga	27	3	0	0	—		—		27	3
Career total			169	8	6	0	2	0	0	0	177	8
