= Berkay Yılmaz (footballer, born 2005) =

Turkish footballer

Personal information
- Date of birth: 25 February 2005 (age 21)
- Place of birth: Singen, Germany
- Height: 1.78 m (5 ft 10 in)
- Position: Left-back

Team information
- Current team: SC Freiburg
- Number: 27

Youth career
- 2008–2017: DJK Singen
- 2017–2019: FC Schaffhausen
- 2019–2020: FC Radolfzell
- 2020–2023: SC Freiburg

Senior career*
Years	Team	Apps	(Gls)
2023–2026	SC Freiburg II	14	(1)
2024–2026	→ 1. FC Nürnberg (loan)	57	(0)
2026–	SC Freiburg	1	(0)

International career^{‡}
2021–2022	Turkey U17	6	(0)
2022	Turkey U18	5	(0)
2023–2024	Turkey U19	14	(0)
2024	Turkey U20	2	(0)
2025–	Turkey U21	8	(0)
- * Club domestic league appearances and goals as of 5 September 2026 ‡ National team caps and goals as of 31 March 2026

Berkay Yılmaz (born 25 February 2005) is a professional footballer who plays as a left-back for Bundesliga club SC Freiburg. Born in Germany, he is a youth international for Turkey.

== Club career ==
Yılmaz is a youth product of DJK Singen, FC Schaffhausen and FC Radolfzell, before moving to the youth academy of SC Freiburg in 2020. In July 2021, he signed a professional contract with Freiburg until 2025. In 2023, he was promoted to Freiburg's reserves in the 3. Liga.

On 27 August 2024, Yılmaz joined 1. FC Nürnberg in 2. Bundesliga on loan.

== International career ==
Born in Germany, Yılmaz is of Turkish descent. He was called up to the Turkey U19s for the 2024 UEFA European Under-19 Championship.

== Career statistics ==
As of match played 5 September 2026

Appearances and goals by club, season and competition
Club	Season	League			Cup		Europe		Other		Total	
Club	Season	Division	Apps	Goals	Apps	Goals	Apps	Goals	Apps	Goals	Apps	Goals
SC Freiburg II	2023–24	3. Liga	13	1	—		—		—		13	1
SC Freiburg II	2024–25	Regionalliga Südwest	1	0	—		—		—		1	0
SC Freiburg II	Total		14	1	—		—		—		14	1
1. FC Nürnberg (loan)	2024–25	2. Bundesliga	24	0	1	0	—		—		25	0
1. FC Nürnberg (loan)	2025–26	2. Bundesliga	33	0	1	1	—		—		34	1
1. FC Nürnberg (loan)	Total		57	0	2	1	—		—		59	1
SC Freiburg	2026–27	Bundesliga	1	0	0	0	1 (Note: Appearances in UEFA Conference League)	0	—		2	0
Career total			72	1	2	1	1	0	0	0	75	2

== Honours ==
Individual

- UEFA European Under-19 Championship Team of the Tournament: 2024
