= Cristian Carletti =

Italian footballer (born 1996)

Personal information
- Date of birth: 27 July 1996 (age 30)
- Place of birth: Cremona, Italy
- Height: 1.85 m (6 ft 1 in)
- Position: Forward

Youth career
- Cremonese

Senior career*
Years	Team	Apps	(Gls)
2015–2016	Ariete	18	(27)
2016–2017	Pergolettese	19	(7)
2017–2021	Carpi	38	(6)
2018	→ Prato (loan)	11	(2)
2018–2019	→ Gozzano (loan)	21	(1)
2021	→ Arezzo (loan)	11	(2)
2021–2023	Latina	51	(15)
2023	Trento	15	(1)
2023–2024	AlbinoLeffe	11	(0)
- * Club domestic league appearances and goals

Cristian Carletti (born 27 July 1996) is an Italian former footballer who played as a forward.

== Career ==
Carletti begun his career with Ariete in the Terza categoria - the Italian ninth (and last) division - where he was top scorer with 27 goals in 18 games, and within ten months transferred to both Pergolettese in the Serie D, and then to Carpi in the Serie B. Carletti made his professional debut in a 0–0 draw against Perugia on 26 March 2017.

On 7 January 2021, he was loaned to Arezzo with an option to purchase.

On 19 August 2021, he signed a two-year contract with Latina.

On 5 January 2023, Carletti moved to Trento on a 1.5-year contract.

On 19 July 2023, Carletti joined AlbinoLeffe.
