= Salvatore Longo =

Italian footballer (born 2000)

Personal information
- Date of birth: 19 May 2000 (age 26)
- Place of birth: Catania, Italy
- Height: 1.91 m (6 ft 3 in)
- Position: Forward

Team information
- Current team: Scafatese
- Number: 91

Youth career
- –2019: Fiorentina

Senior career*
Years	Team	Apps	(Gls)
2019–2021	Fiorentina	0	(0)
2019–2020	→ Bisceglie (loan)	23	(0)
2020–2021	→ Pergolettese (loan)	24	(2)
2021–2023	Turris	53	(3)
2023–2025	AlbinoLeffe	56	(8)
2025–2026	Monopoli	32	(6)
2026–	Scafatese	2	(1)
- * Club domestic league appearances and goals as of 28 August 2026

Salvatore Longo (born 19 May 2000) is an Italian professional footballer who plays as a forward for Serie C Group C club Scafatese.

== Club career ==
=== Fiorentina ===
He is a product of Fiorentina youth teams and started playing for their Under-19 squad in the 2017–18 season. He was not called up to the senior squad in 2017–18 and 2018–19 seasons.

==== Loan to Bisceglie ====
On 2 August 2019 he joined Serie C club Bisceglie on loan.

He made his professional Serie C debut for Bisceglie on 25 August 2019 in a game against Rende. He started the game and was substituted in the 71st minute.

=== Turris ===
On 1 July 2021, he signed a three-year contract with Serie C club Turris.

=== AlbinoLeffe ===
On 17 July 2023, Longo joined AlbinoLeffe on a two-year contract.
