= Stefano Marchetti (footballer, born 1998) =

Italian footballer

Personal information
- Date of birth: 22 April 1998 (age 28)
- Place of birth: Vimercate, Italy
- Height: 1.89 m (6 ft 2 in)
- Position: Defender

Team information
- Current team: Folgore Caratese
- Number: 5

Youth career
- –2017: Atalanta

Senior career*
Years	Team	Apps	(Gls)
2017–2020	Atalanta	0	(0)
2017–2018	→ FeralpiSalò (loan)	1	(0)
2018–2019	→ Rimini (loan)	15	(0)
2019–2020	→ Renate (loan)	5	(0)
2020–2021	Giana Erminio	31	(1)
2021–2024	AlbinoLeffe	69	(2)
2024–2026	Pro Vercelli	61	(0)
2026–	Folgore Caratese	1	(0)
- * Club domestic league appearances and goals as of 24 August 2026

Stefano Marchetti (born 22 April 1998) is an Italian football player who plays for Serie C Group A club Folgore Caratese.

== Club career ==
He made his Serie C debut for FeralpiSalò on 26 November 2017 in a game against Santarcangelo.

On 5 July 2019, he joined Renate on loan.

On 4 September 2020, he signed a one-year contract with Giana Erminio.

On 16 July 2021 he moved to AlbinoLeffe.

On 24 July 2024, Marchetti joined Pro Vercelli.
