= Piet Scobel =

German footballer

Personal information
- Date of birth: 22 April 2005 (age 21)
- Place of birth: Pinneberg, Germany
- Height: 1.91 m (6 ft 3 in)
- Position: Striker

Team information
- Current team: 1. FC Nürnberg
- Number: 19

Youth career
- 2009–2017: SV Halstenbek-Rellingen
- 2017–2020: FC St. Pauli
- 2020–2022: Blau-Weiß 96 Schenefeld
- 2022–2023: SV Lieth

Senior career*
Years	Team	Apps	(Gls)
2023–2024	Union Tornesch	28	(15)
2024–2025	Eimsbütteler TV	17	(19)
2025	1. FC Nürnberg II	29	(16)
2025–	1. FC Nürnberg	27	(5)
- * Club domestic league appearances and goals as of 16:36, 22 September 2026 (UTC)

Piet Scobel (born 22 April 2005) is a German professional footballer who plays as a striker for 2. Bundesliga club 1. FC Nürnberg.

== Early and personal life ==
Scobel was born in Pinneberg. He was a boyhood supporter of Hamburger SV.

== Career ==
Scobel played youth football for SV Halstenbek-Rellingen between 2009 and 2017 and then FC St. Pauli between 2017 and 2020.

After leaving St Pauli in 2020, he played youth football with Blau-Weiß 96 Schenefeld and SV Lieth, joining the latter in 2022. In summer 2023, he moved to play senior football with Union Tornesch, alongside five SV Lieth teammates. He scored 15 goals in 28 Oberliga Hamburg matches with Tornesch, before joining Eimsbütteler TV in summer 2024, where he scored 19 in 17 Oberliga Hamburg games.

In January 2025, Scobel signed for 1. FC Nürnberg on a contract until summer 2028, initially joining their reserve team in the Regionalliga Bayern. He scored 5 goals in 12 matches for the reserve side in the second half of the 2024–25 season, and then 11 goals in 17 matches in the first half of the 2025–26 season.

Scobel also made four brief substitute appearances for the first-team in the first half of the 2025–26 season, but was given his first start for the first team at home to SV Elversberg on 17 January 2026, the first match after the winter break, having played with the first-team for their winter friendlies. Scobel scored two headers to give the club a 3–2 win, though he did not score again for the club that season in a further 16 appearances.

Scobel was became a regular first-team starter for Nürnberg at the start of the 2026–27 season, starting the first five matches in all competitions, in which he scored five goals, including a brace in a 4–2 win against local rivals Greuther Fürth.

== Style of play ==
Scobel is a striker. He is 1.91 metres tall and has been described as an proficient goalscorer, both with his feet and his head.
