= Mihai Gușu =

Romanian footballer

Personal information
- Full name: Vasilică Mihai Gușu
- Date of birth: 24 December 1996 (age 29)
- Place of birth: Rădăuți, Romania
- Height: 1.82 m (6 ft 0 in)
- Position: Defender

Team information
- Current team: AlbinoLeffe
- Number: 16

Youth career
- –2013: Borgosesia

Senior career*
Years	Team	Apps	(Gls)
2013–2014	Borgosesia	17	(0)
2014–2015	Carrarese	0	(0)
2015	→ Borgosesia (loan)	15	(0)
2015–2017	Borgosesia	69	(1)
2017–	AlbinoLeffe	254	(11)
- * Club domestic league appearances and goals as of 20 September 2026

Vasilică Mihai Gușu (born 24 December 1996) is a Romanian professional footballer who plays as a defender for Serie C club AlbinoLeffe.

== Career ==
=== AlbinoLeffe ===
In July 2017, Gușu joined Serie C club AlbinoLeffe. He made his competitive debut for the club on 27 August 2017, coming on as a 75th-minute substitute for Fausto Coppola in a 1–0 defeat to Südtirol. He scored his first goal for the club as part of a brace later that season, scoring in the 16th and 27th minutes of a 3–1 victory over Feralpisalò.

== Career statistics ==
As of match played 20 September 2026

Appearances and goals by club, season and competition
Club	Season	League			National cup (Note: Includes Coppa Italia and Coppa Italia Serie C)		Europe		Other		Total	
Club	Season	Division	Apps	Goals	Apps	Goals	Apps	Goals	Apps	Goals	Apps	Goals
Borgosesia	2013–14	Serie D	17	0	—		—		—		17	0
Borgosesia (loan)	2014–15	Serie D	15	0	—		—		3 (Note: Appearances in Serie D promotion play-offs)	0	18	0
Borgosesia	2015–16	Serie D	36	1	—		—		—		36	1
Borgosesia	2016–17	Serie D	33	0	—		—		1	0	34	0
Borgosesia	Total		101	1	—		—		4	0	105	1
AlbinoLeffe	2017–18	Serie C	22	2	3	1	—		2 (Note: Appearances in Serie C promotion play-offs)	0	27	3
AlbinoLeffe	2018–19	Serie C	27	0	4	0	—		—		31	0
AlbinoLeffe	2019–20	Serie C	27	0	2	0	—		1	0	30	0
AlbinoLeffe	2020–21	Serie C	29	1	2	1	—		8	0	39	2
AlbinoLeffe	2021–22	Serie C	29	2	3	0	—		—		32	0
AlbinoLeffe	2022–23	Serie C	36	2	0	0	—		2 (Note: Appearances in Serie C relegation play-offs)	0	38	2
AlbinoLeffe	2023–24	Serie C	31	3	0	0	—		—		31	3
AlbinoLeffe	2024–25	Serie C	33	0	2	0	—		1	0	36	0
AlbinoLeffe	2025–26	Serie C	17	1	0	0	—		—		17	1
AlbinoLeffe	2026–27	Serie C	3	0	0	0	—		—		3	0
AlbinoLeffe	Total		254	11	16	2	—		14	0	284	13
Career total			355	12	16	2	—		18	0	389	14
