= Eric Porstner =

German footballer (born 2007)

Personal information
- Date of birth: 9 May 2007 (age 19)
- Place of birth: Nuremberg, Germany
- Height: 1.87 m (6 ft 2 in)
- Position: Left-back

Team information
- Current team: 1. FC Nürnberg
- Number: 41

Youth career
- 2011–2014: SC Eltersdorf
- 2014–2018: Greuther Fürth
- 2018–2025: 1. FC Nürnberg

Senior career*
Years	Team	Apps	(Gls)
2025–	1. FC Nürnberg II	20	(5)
2025–	1. FC Nürnberg	12	(0)

International career^{‡}
2026–	Germany U20	2	(0)
- * Club domestic league appearances and goals as of 19 September 2026 ‡ National team caps and goals as of 29 September 2026

Eric Porstner (born 29 May 2006) is a German professional footballer who plays as a left-back for 2. Bundesliga club 1. FC Nürnberg.
