= Michael Brentan =

Italian footballer

Personal information
- Date of birth: 16 April 2002 (age 24)
- Place of birth: Piove di Sacco, Italy
- Height: 1.78 m (5 ft 10 in)
- Position: Midfielder

Team information
- Current team: Torres
- Number: 4

Youth career
- 20006–2007: Corte
- 2007–2010: Lupia Maggiore
- 2010–2014: Padova
- 2014–2016: Inter Milan
- 2016: Venezia
- 2016–2020: Juventus
- 2019–2020: → Sampdoria (loan)

Senior career*
Years	Team	Apps	(Gls)
2021–2022	Sampdoria	0	(0)
2021–2022	→ Pro Sesto (loan)	36	(1)
2022–2024	AlbinoLeffe	62	(0)
2024–	Torres	60	(1)

International career^{‡}
2018	Italy U16	7	(1)
2018–2019	Italy U17	19	(2)
2019–2020	Italy U18	6	(0)
- * Club domestic league appearances and goals as of 30 April 2026 ‡ National team caps and goals as of 12 February 2020

Michael Brentan (born 16 April 2002) is an Italian professional footballer who plays as a midfielder for Serie C Group B club Torres.

== Club career ==
Born in Piove di Sacco, Brentan finish his youth career in Juventus and Sampdoria.

In 2021, he signed for Sampdoria.

On 21 July 2021, he joined Serie C club Pro Sesto on loan. He made his professional debut on 29 August 2021 against Giana Erminio.

On 18 August 2022, Brentan signed with AlbinoLeffe.

On 8 July 2024, Brentan moved to Torres.

== International career ==
Brentan was a young international for Italy. He was named in the 2019 FIFA U-17 World Cup final squad.
