= Luca Milesi (footballer) =

Italian footballer

Personal information
- Date of birth: 28 April 1993 (age 33)
- Place of birth: San Giovanni Bianco, Italy
- Height: 1.89 m (6 ft 2 in)
- Position: Centre-back

Team information
- Current team: Dolomiti Bellunesi

Youth career
- –2012: Atalanta

Senior career*
Years	Team	Apps	(Gls)
2012–2018	Atalanta	0	(0)
2013–2014	→ Benevento (loan)	15	(0)
2014–2015	→ Pro Vercelli (loan)	8	(0)
2015–2017	→ Arezzo (loan)	30	(1)
2017	→ Modena (loan)	15	(1)
2017–2018	→ Vicenza (loan)	34	(0)
2018–2019	Pro Vercelli	31	(0)
2019–2020	Piacenza	25	(0)
2020–2021	Modena	8	(0)
2021	→ Carrarese (loan)	16	(0)
2021–2022	Siena	17	(1)
2022–2024	AlbinoLeffe	70	(3)
2024–2025	Potenza	20	(0)
2025–	Dolomiti	12	(0)
2026	→ Pergolettese (loan)	17	(2)
- * Club domestic league appearances and goals as of 25 April 2026

Luca Milesi (born 28 April 1993) is an Italian professional footballer who plays as a centre-back for Serie C Group A club Dolomiti Bellunesi.

== Club career ==
Born in San Giovanni Bianco in the Bergamo Province, Luca began his career on hometown's club Atalanto, entering in the youth categories and later he played on Primavera club. On 28 August 2013 he was loaned to Lega Pro club Benevento.

On 8 September 2014 he made his first match as a professional, starting in a 1–1 draw against Grosseto at the Stadio Olimpico Carlo Zecchini, for the Lega Pro championship.

On 29 August 2019, he signed a two-year contract with Piacenza. In May 2020, after a two-month break of Italian Serie C due to the COVID-19 pandemic, he decided to leave the club following the decision of his team-mate Antonio Pergreffi.

On 16 September 2020 he returned to Modena. On 14 January 2021, he was loaned to Carrarese.

On 12 August 2021, Milesi signed with Siena in Serie C. He made his debut on the first matchday of the domestic league on 29 August in a 3–0 win over Vis Pesaro. On 1 November, he scored his first goal for the club, securing a 2–1 win in the 90th minute of the match against Gubbio.

On 31 January 2022, Milesi moved to AlbinoLeffe. On 30 August 2024, he signed with Potenza.
