= Winners Osawe =

German football player (born 2006)

Personal information
- Full name: Winners Mark Osawe
- Date of birth: 29 November 2006 (age 19)
- Place of birth: Berlin, Germany
- Height: 1.89 m (6 ft 2 in)
- Position: Defensive midfielder

Team information
- Current team: 1. FC Nürnberg

Youth career
- 2015–2019: Berliner AK 07
- 2019–2024: RB Leipzig

Senior career*
Years	Team	Apps	(Gls)
2024–	1. FC Nürnberg II	26	(1)
2025–	1. FC Nürnberg	2	(0)
2026	→ 1. FC Schweinfurt 05 (loan)	12	(1)

International career^{‡}
2023–2024	Germany U17	16	(1)
2024–2025	Germany U19	12	(0)
2025–	Germany U20	1	(0)
Medal record
Men's football
Representing Germany
FIFA U-17 World Cup
Winner	2023 Indonesia
UEFA European Under-17 Championship
Winner	2023 Hungary
- * Club domestic league appearances and goals as of 30 May 2026 ‡ National team caps and goals as of 9 September 2025

Winners Mark Osawe (born 29 November 2006) is a German professional footballer who plays as defensive midfielder for 2. Bundesliga club 1. FC Nürnberg.

== Club career ==
A youth product of Berliner AK 07, Osawe joined RB Leipzig's academy in 2019 where he finished his development. On 30 June 2024, he transferred to 1. FC Nürnberg, where he was originally assigned to their reserves. On 18 May 2025, he debuted with the senior Nürnberg in a 2. Bundesliga win over Eintracht Braunschweig.

On 15 January 2026, Osawe moved on loan to 1. FC Schweinfurt 05.

== International career ==
Born in Germany, Osawe is of Nigerian descent and holds dual-citizenship. He was called up to the Germany U17s for the squad that won the 2023 UEFA European Under-17 Championship. That same year he was part of the Germany U17s that won the 2023 FIFA U-17 World Cup.

== Playing style ==
Osawe is a physically robust, technically adept midfielder who can act both defensively and offensively. His style of play is compared to that of the French midfielder Paul Pogba.

== Honours ==
Germany U17

- FIFA U-17 World Cup: 2023
- UEFA European Under-17 Championship: 2023

Individual

- UEFA European Under-19 Championship Team of the Tournament: 2025
