= List of 1. FC Nürnberg managers =

This is a list of details of 1. FC Nürnberg managers and their statistics, trophies and other records.

== Managers, tenure, wins, draws, losses and winning percentage ==
As of 30 May 2020

| No. | Managers | From | To | Record | | | | |
| No. | Managers | From | To | G | W | D | L | Win % |
|---|---|---|---|---|---|---|---|---|
| 1 | Herbert Widmayer | 1 July 1960 | 30 October 1963 | 134 | 89 | 17 | 28 | 66.42 |
| 2 | Jeno Csaknady | 1 November 1963 | 30 June 1964 | 22 | 8 | 5 | 9 | 36.36 |
| 3 | Gunter Baumann | 1 July 1964 | 30 June 1965 | 34 | 14 | 10 | 10 | 41.18 |
| 4 | Jeno Csaknady | 1 July 1965 | 7 November 1966 | 54 | 22 | 14 | 18 | 40.74 |
| 5 | Jenő Vincze | 8 November 1966 | 31 December 1966 | 8 | 0 | 3 | 5 | 0.00 |
| 6 | Max Merkel | 3 January 1967 | 24 March 1969 | 88 | 37 | 26 | 25 | 42.05 |
| 7 | Robert Körner | 25 March 1969 | 12 April 1969 | 4 | 1 | 1 | 2 | 25.00 |
| 8 | Kuno Klötzer | 14 April 1969 | 30 June 1970 | 47 | 29 | 11 | 7 | 61.70 |
| 9 | Thomas Barthel | 1 July 1970 | 30 June 1971 | 46 | 27 | 10 | 9 | 58.70 |
| 10 | Slobodan Mihajlović | 1 July 1971 | 1 August 1971 | | | | | |
| 11 | Fritz Langner | 2 August 1971 | 5 December 1971 | | | | | |
| 12 | Zlatko Čajkovski | 6 December 1971 | 30 June 1973 | | | | | |
| 13 | Hans Tilkowski | 1 July 1973 | 30 June 1976 | 79 | 43 | 14 | 22 | 54.43 |
| 14 | Horst Buhtz | 1 July 1976 | 19 May 1978 | 76 | 40 | 22 | 14 | 52.63 |
| 15 | Werner Kern | 20 May 1978 | 20 December 1978 | 20 | 6 | 1 | 13 | 30.00 |
| 16 | Robert Gebhardt | 21 December 1978 | 30 June 1979 | 20 | 6 | 7 | 7 | 30.00 |
| 17 | Jeff Vliers | 1 July 1979 | 18 August 1979 | 3 | 0 | 1 | 2 | 0.00 |
| 18 | Robert Gebhardt | 19 September 1979 | 30 June 1980 | 38 | 27 | 8 | 3 | 71.05 |
| 19 | Horst Heese | 1 July 1980 | 3 March 1981 | 26 | 9 | 5 | 12 | 34.62 |
| 20 | Fritz Popp | 4 March 1981 | 26 May 1981 | 9 | 3 | 0 | 6 | 33.33 |
| 21 | Fred Hoffmann | 27 May 1981 | 30 June 1981 | 3 | 1 | 2 | 0 | 33.33 |
| 22 | Heinz Elzner | 1 July 1981 | 8 September 1981 | 5 | 0 | 0 | 5 | 0.00 |
| 23 | Udo Klug | 9 September 1981 | 25 October 1983 | 83 | 32 | 12 | 39 | 38.55 |
| 24 | Rudi Kröner | 26 October 1983 | 6 December 1983 | 5 | 0 | 1 | 4 | 0.00 |
| 25 | Fritz Popp | 7 December 1983 | 31 December 1983 | 1 | 0 | 0 | 1 | 0.00 |
| 26 | Heinz Höher | 1 January 1984 | 30 June 1988 | 167 | 67 | 33 | 67 | 40.12 |
| 27 | Hermann Gerland | 1 July 1988 | 9 April 1990 | 66 | 18 | 21 | 27 | 27.27 |
| 28 | Dieter Lieberwirth | 10 April 1990 | 30 June 1990 | 7 | 3 | 1 | 3 | 42.86 |
| 29 | Arie Haan | 1 July 1990 | 30 June 1991 | 37 | 11 | 10 | 16 | 29.73 |
| 30 | Willi Entenmann | 1 July 1991 | 9 November 1993 | 94 | 36 | 18 | 40 | 38.30 |
| 31 | Dieter Renner | 10 November 1993 | 2 January 1994 | 5 | 1 | 1 | 3 | 20.00 |
| 32 | Rainer Zobel | 3 January 1994 | 31 December 1994 | 32 | 8 | 12 | 12 | 25.00 |
| 33 | Günter Sebert | 1 January 1995 | 30 June 1995 | 151 | 66 | 32 | 53 | 43.71 |
| 34 | Hermann Gerland | 1 July 1995 | 30 April 1996 | 31 | 10 | 12 | 9 | 32.26 |
| 35 | Willi Entenmann | 1 May 1996 | 31 August 1997 | 14 | 4 | 1 | 9 | 28.57 |
| 36 | Felix Magath | 1 September 1997 | 30 June 1998 | 29 | 16 | 8 | 5 | 55.17 |
| 37 | Willi Reimann | 1 July 1998 | 30 November 1998 | 17 | 3 | 8 | 6 | 17.65 |
| 38 | Thomas Brunner (interim) | 1 December 1998 | 31 December 1998 | 3 | 0 | 1 | 2 | 0.00 |
| 39 | Friedel Rausch | 1 January 1999 | 18 February 2000 | 36 | 13 | 11 | 12 | 36.11 |
| 40 | Thomas Brunner (interim) | 19 February 2000 | 2 March 2000 | 1 | 0 | 1 | 0 | 0.00 |
| 41 | Klaus Augenthaler | 3 March 2000 | 29 April 2003 | 119 | 49 | 20 | 50 | 41.18 |
| 42 | Wolfgang Wolf | 30 April 2003 | 31 October 2005 | 89 | 33 | 19 | 37 | 37.08 |
| 43 | Dieter Lieberwirth (interim) | 1 November 2005 | 8 November 2005 | 1 | 1 | 0 | 0 | 100.00 |
| 44 | Hans Meyer | 9 November 2005 | 11 February 2008 | 89 | 32 | 31 | 26 | 35.96 |
| 45 | Thomas von Heesen | 12 February 2008 | 28 August 2008 | 20 | 4 | 8 | 8 | 20.00 |
| 46 | Michael Oenning | 2 September 2008 | 21 December 2009 | 54 | 21 | 15 | 18 | 38.89 |
| 47 | Dieter Hecking | 22 December 2009 | 22 December 2012 | 112 | 42 | 24 | 46 | 37.50 |
| 48 | Michael Wiesinger & Armin Reutershahn | 24 December 2012 | 7 October 2013 | 26 | 6 | 12 | 8 | 23.08 |
| 49 | Roger Prinzen (interim) | 7 October 2013 | 22 October 2013 | 1 | 0 | 1 | 0 | 0.00 |
| 50 | Gertjan Verbeek | 22 October 2013 | 23 April 2014 | 22 | 5 | 5 | 12 | 22.73 |
| 51 | Roger Prinzen (interim) | 23 April 2014 | 5 June 2014 | 3 | 0 | 0 | 3 | 0.00 |
| 52 | Valérien Ismaël | 5 June 2014 | 10 November 2014 | 14 | 4 | 2 | 8 | 28.57 |
| 53 | René Weiler | 12 November 2014 | 30 June 2016 | 60 | 30 | 13 | 17 | 50.00 |
| 54 | René Weiler | 30 June 2016 | 7 March 2017 | 25 | 8 | 6 | 11 | 32.00 |
| 55 | Michael Köllner | 7 March 2017 | 12 February 2019 | 72 | 26 | 17 | 29 | 36.11 |
| 56 | Boris Schommers (interim) | 12 February 2019 | 19 May 2019 | 13 | 1 | 4 | 8 | 7.69 |
| 57 | Damir Canadi | 19 May 2019 | 4 November 2019 | 14 | 4 | 6 | 4 | 28.57 |
| 58 | Marek Mintál (interim) | 4 November 2019 | 12 November 2019 | 1 | 0 | 0 | 1 | 0.00 |
| 59 | Jens Keller | 12 November 2019 | June 2020 | 16 | 4 | 6 | 6 | 25.00 |
