= List of 1. FC Nürnberg players =

1. FC Nürnberg is a German football club based in Nuremberg, Bavaria. The following list contains all the footballers that have made over 100 league appearances for the club since 1945.

== Players ==
Statistics correct as of the end of the 2022–23 season

Name	Nationality	Position	Club career	Appearances	Goals	Notes
Richard Albrecht	Germany	Forward	1957–1965	137	40	
Frank Baumann	Germany	Defender	1994–1999	130	11	
Gunther Baumann	Germany	Midfielder	1949–1956	154	12	
Hanno Behrens	Germany	Midfielder	2015–2021	182	30	
Bertram Beierlorzer	Germany	Defender	1977–1981	119	6	
Gerhard Bergner	Germany	Midfielder	1946–1956	234	4	
Franz Brungs	Germany	Forward	1965–1968, 1971–1972	125	56	
Hans-Jürgen Brunner	Germany	Midfielder	1984–1989	102	5	
Thomas Brunner	Germany	Defender	1980–1996	402	25	
Jörg Dittwar	Germany	Defender	1987–1994	150	12	
Hans Dorfner	Germany	Midfielder	1984–1986, 1991–1994	111	10	
Martin Driller	Germany	Forward	1997–2004	112	29	
Dieter Eckstein	Germany	Forward	1984–1988, 1991–1993	226	79	
Norbert Eder	Germany	Defender	1974–1984	300	27	
Christian Eigler	Germany	Forward	2008–2012	111	20	
Karl-Heinz Ferschl	Germany	Defender	1961–1968	120	5	
Gustav Flachenecker	Germany	Forward	1959–1967	121	59	
Mike Frantz	Germany	Midfielder	2008–2014	125	10	
Robert Gebhardt	Germany	Midfielder	1936–1950	125	22	
Kurt Geinzer	Germany	Defender	1971–1977	156	15	
Johannes Geis	Germany	Midfielder	2019–	120	11	
Anders Giske	Norway	Defender	1983–1984, 1985–1989	118	4	
Günther Glomb	Germany	Forward	1951–1959	166	66	
André Golke	Germany	Midfielder	1991–1992, 1993–1995	100	18	
Roland Grahammer	Germany	Defender	1983–1988	149	19	
Tim Handwerker	Germany	Defender	2019–	103	3	
Rudolf Hannakampf	Germany	Defender	1973–1977	103	2	
Werner Heck	Germany	Forward	1980–1984	114	34	
Herbert Heidenreich	Germany	Midfielder	1978–1984	171	26	
Helmut Herbolsheimer	Germany	Forward	1942–1956	264	89	
Helmut Hilpert	Germany	Defender	1959–1968	191	5	
Reinhold Hintermaier	Austria	Midfielder	1979–1984, 1992–1993, 1995	128	16	
Rudi Kargus	Germany	Goalkeeper	1980–1984	131	0	
Georg Kennemann	Germany	Midfielder	1939–1951	134	4	
Adolf Knoll	Germany	Defender	1941–1945, 1946–1950, 1955–1958	195	1	
Andreas Köpke	Germany	Goalkeeper	1986–1994, 1999–2001	338	2	
Tomasz Kos	Poland	Defender	1999–2004	102	1	
Jacek Krzynowek	Poland	Midfielder	1999–2004	142	28	
Markus Kurth	Germany	Forward	1995–1999	121	30	
Marco Kurz	Germany	Defender	1990–1994	108	0	
Tommy Svindal Larsen	Norway	Defender	2001–2005	109	2	
Tim Leibold	Germany	Defender	2015–2019	102	8	
Horst Leupold	Germany	Defender	1961–1972	223	3	
Dieter Lieberwirth	Germany	Midfielder	1975–1988	270	39	
Jan Majkowski	Germany	Midfielder	1971–1977, 1978–1981	142	8	
Georg Margreitter	Austria	Defender	2015–2021	129	9	
Christian Mathenia	Germany	Goalkeeper	2018–	130	0	
Marek Mintál	Slovakia	Midfielder	2003–2011	180	66	
Alfred Mirsberger	Germany	Defender	1947–1955	169	10	
Max Morlock	Germany	Forward	1942–1965	472	294	
Lukas Mühl	Germany	Defender	2016–2021	123	3	
Heinrich Müller	Germany	Forward	1954–1967	158	46	
Heinz Müller	Germany	Forward	1966–1972	153	15	
Lars Müller	Germany	Midfielder	2001–2006	138	6	
Ludwig Müller	Germany	Defender	1964–1969	136	10	
Marek Nikl	Czech Republic	Defender	1998–2007	228	16	
Fabian Nürnberger	Germany	Midfielder	2018–2023	100	7	
Dieter Nüssing	Germany	Midfielder	1968–1977	299	95	
Marc Oechler	Germany	Midfielder	1986–1999	273	25	
Ulrich Pechtold	Germany	Defender	1974–1977	110	10	
Ondrej Petrak	Czech Republic	Midfielder	2014–2020	127	3	
Slobodan Petrović	Yugoslavia	Midfielder	1972–1979	185	23	
Joachim Philipkowski	Germany	Midfielder	1985–1992	154	13	
Javier Pinola	Argentina	Defender	2005–2015	260	7	
Jan Polák	Czech Republic	Midfielder	2005–2007, 2014–2016	101	6	
Hans Pöschl	Germany	Forward	1938–1950	140	91	
Fritz Popp	Germany	Defender	1962–1972	235	3	
Alois Reinhardt	Germany	Defender	1979–1984	102	7	
Dominik Reinhardt	Germany	Defender	2002–2009	121	1	
Stefan Reisch	Germany	Midfielder	1960–1967	167	17	
Stefan Reuter	Germany	Midfielder	1984–1988	125	13	
Manfred Rüsing	Germany	Defender	1973–1977	113	1	
Raphael Schäfer	Germany	Goalkeeper	2001–2007, 2008–2017	358	0	
Eduard Schaffer	Germany	Goalkeeper	1947–1958	228	0	
Gustav Schober	Germany	Midfielder	1947–1960	152	6	
Reinhold Schöll	Germany	Defender	1974–1984	140	3	
Manfred Schwabl	Germany	Midfielder	1986–1989, 1993–1994	133	9	
Waldemar Schweinberger	Germany	Forward	1952–1961	153	40	
Timmy Simons	Belgium	Midfielder	2010–2013	102	11	
Peter Stocker	Germany	Defender	1975–1983	248	8	
Armin Störzenhofecker	Germany	Midfielder	1995–2001	173	4	
Heinz Strehl	Germany	Forward	1954–1970	300	159	
Rudolf Sturz	Germany	Defender	1971–1977	189	32	
Jürgen Täuber	Germany	Defender	1976–1984	202	5	
Amand Theis	Germany	Defender	1968–1972	108	6	
Kurt Ucko	Germany	Midfielder	1949–1961	280	20	
Hans Uebelein	Germany	Midfielder	1934–1951	122	2	
Enrico Valentini	Italy	Defender	2017–	145	5	
Róbert Vittek	Slovakia	Forward	2003–2008	124	36	
Georg Volkert	Germany	Forward	1965–1969, 1980–1981	136	37	
Roland Wabra	Germany	Goalkeeper	1954–1969	303	0	
Martin Wagner	Germany	Midfielder	1988–1992	100	14	
Hans Walitza	Germany	Forward	1974–1979	127	71	
Ferdinand Wenauer	Germany	Defender	1958–1972	403	7	
Horst Weyerich	Germany	Defender	1975–1985	230	48	
Michael Wiesinger	Germany	Midfielder	1993–1999	186	25	
Tasso Wild	Germany	Midfielder	1959–1967	153	55	
Konrad Winterstein	Germany	Forward	1945–1955	243	96	
Andreas Wolf	Germany	Defender	2002–2011	213	7	
Walter Zeitler	Germany	Defender	1952–1960	147	1	
Josef Zenger	Germany	Forward	1956–1964	115	22	
Rainer Zietsch	Germany	Defender	1991–1996	140	7	
