= 1986–87 1. FC Nürnberg season =

1. FC Nürnberg
1986–87 season
- Manager: Heinz Höher
- Bundesliga: 9th
- DFB-Pokal: 2nd Round
- Top goalscorer: League: Jørn Andersen (14); All: Jørn Andersen (16)

The 1986–87 1. FC Nürnberg season was the 87th year of existence. The club was the record-champions up until the end of the season.

== Review and events ==
1. FC Nürnberg finished the season in 9th place and lost the title of record-champions.

== Match results ==
=== Legend ===
Win Draw Loss

=== Bundesliga ===
Match	Date	Time^{1}	Venue	City	Opponent	Result^{2}	Attendance	1. FC Nürnberg; goalscorers	Sources
1	9 August 1986	15:30	Weserstadion	Bremen	Werder Bremen	3–5	25.000	Lieberwirth 20'; Andersen 34'; Grahammer 88' (pen.)	
2	16 August 1986	15:30	Städtisches Stadion	Nuremberg	VfL Bochum	3–3	25.500	Eckstein 16'; Grahammer 31' (pen.), 43' (pen.)	
3	22 August 1986	20:00	Waldstadion	Frankfurt	Eintracht Frankfurt	0–1	30.000	—	
4	3 September 1986	20:00	Städtisches Stadion	Nuremberg	Bayern Munich	1–2	56.000	Philipkowski 32'	
5	6 September 1986	15:30	Ulrich-Haberland-Stadion	Leverkusen	Bayer Leverkusen	0–2	12.500	—	
6	12 September 1986	20:00	Städtisches Stadion	Nuremberg	Waldhof Mannheim	1–1	23.700	Eckstein 29' (pen.)	
7	20 September 1986	15:30	Waldstadion	Homburg	FC 08 Homburg	0–2	7.000	—	
8	27 September 1986	15:30	Städtisches Stadion	Nuremberg	Bayer 05 Uerdingen	1–1	18.500	Andersen 82'	
9	4 October 1986	15:30	Neckarstadion	Stuttgart	VfB Stuttgart	1–1	29.000	Andersen 18'	
10	11 October 1986	15:30	Städtisches Stadion	Nuremberg	Schalke 04	2–1	26.700	Philipkowski 18'; Schwabl 41'	
11	17 October 1986	20:00	Westfalenstadion	Dortmund	Borussia Dortmund	2–2	27.000	Jambo 49'; Eckstein 67'	
12	1 November 1986	15:30	Städtisches Stadion	Nuremberg	Fortuna Düsseldorf	4–3	24.000	Reuter 14' (pen.); Eckstein 18', 83'; Stenzel 73'	
13	8 November 1986	15:30	Müngersdorfer Stadion	Cologne	1. FC Köln	1–3	9.000	Andersen 62'	
14	15 November 1986	15:30	Städtisches Stadion	Nuremberg	Blau-Weiß Berlin	7–2	22.000	Stenzel 9', 61'; Geyer 38', 49', 72'; Eckstein 50'; Philipkowski 68'	
15	22 November 1986	15:30	Volksparkstadion	Hamburg	Hamburger SV	1–1	13.000	Andersen 82'	
16	28 November 1986	20:00	Fritz-Walter-Stadion	Kaiserslautern	1. FC Kaiserslautern	1–2	33.284	Eckstein 16'	
17	6 December 1986	15:30	Städtisches Stadion	Nuremberg	Borussia Mönchengladbach	2–0	41.300	Andersen 50'; Lieberwirth 84'	
18	21 February 1987	15:30	Städtisches Stadion	Nuremberg	Werder Bremen	5–1	23.000	Eckstein 49'; Reuter 55', 74' (pen.); Andersen 69', 77'	
19	28 February 1987	15:30	Ruhrstadion	Bochum	VfL Bochum	1–0	11.000	Brunner 88'	
20^{3}	7 March 1987	15:30	Parkstadion	Gelsenkirchen	Schalke 04	4–2	14.500	Reuter 8'; Eckstein 29'; Brunner 68'; Andersen 84'	
21^{4}	14 March 1987	15:30	Städtisches Stadion	Nuremberg	Eintracht Frankfurt	1–0	33.200	Reuter 66' (pen.)	
22^{5}	21 March 1987	15:30	Olympic Stadium	Munich	Bayern Munich	0–4	75.000	—	
23^{6}	28 March 1987	15:30	Städtisches Stadion	Nuremberg	Bayer Leverkusen	1–1	25.400	Eckstein 29'	
24^{7}	3 April 1987	20:00	Südweststadion	Ludwigshafen	Waldhof Mannheim	0–3	14.000	—	
25^{8}	10 April 1987	20:00	Städtisches Stadion	Nuremberg	FC 08 Homburg	2–2	16.000	Lieberwirth 65'; Andersen 73'	
26^{9}	15 April 1987	20:00	Grotenburg-Stadion	Krefeld	Bayer Uerdingen	4–3	12.000	Philipkowski 20'; Andersen 49', 59'; Lieberwirth 68'	
27^{10}	25 April 1987	15:30	Städtisches Stadion	Nuremberg	VfB Stuttgart	2–1	28,500	Geyer 4'; Philipkowski 53'	
28	9 May 1987	15:30	Städtisches Stadion	Nuremberg	Borussia Dortmund	1–2	30,500	Grahammer 25'	
29	16 May 1987	15:30	Rheinstadion	Düsseldorf	Fortuna Düsseldorf	1–1	7,500	Giske 28'	
30	23 May 1987	15:30	Städtisches Stadion	Nuremberg	1. FC Köln	1–1	17,000	Andersen 8'	
31	28 May 1987	15:00	Olympic Stadium	Berlin	Blau-Weiß Berlin	4–1	16,882	Wilbois 58', 61'; Stenzel 63', 68'	
32	6 June 1987	15:30	Städtisches Stadion	Nuremberg	Hamburger SV	3–3	24,500	Grahammer 63', 79'; Andersen 73'	
33	13 June 1987	15:30	Städtisches Stadion	Nuremberg	1. FC Kaiserslautern	2–1	19,100	Reuter 4'; Philipkowski 20'	
34	17 June 1987	15:30	Bökelbergstadion	Mönchengladbach	Borussia Mönchengladbach	0–4	13.500	—	

- 1. Match times before 26 October 1986 and after 28 March 1987 were played in Central European Summer Time. Match times from 26 October 1986 to 28 March 1987 were played in Central European Time.
- 2. 1. FC Nürnberg goals listed first.
- 3. Originally Matchday 27.
- 4. Originally Matchday 20.
- 5. Originally Matchday 21.
- 6. Originally Matchday 22.
- 7. Originally Matchday 23.
- 8. Originally Matchday 24.
- 9. Originally Matchday 25.
- 10. Originally Matchday 26.

=== DFB-Pokal ===
31 August 1986 1st Round	FSV Frankfurt	2–8	1. FC Nürnberg	Frankfurt
	Repp 35'; Hofmann 89'	Match Report	32', 68' Grahammer; 42', 88' Wilbois; 51', 86' Andersen; 57' Eckstein; 70' Güttler	Stadium: Stadion am Bornheimer Hang; Attendance: 4.000; Referee: Anton Matheis

24 October 1986 2nd Round	Bayer Uerdingen	3–2	1. FC Nürnberg	Krefeld
	Bierhoff 21'; Funkel 58', 76'	Match Report	9' Grahammer; 69' Reuter	Stadium: Grotenburg-Stadion; Attendance: 7.300; Referee: Neuner

== Player information ==
=== Roster and statistics ===
Squad Season 1986–87 Sources:
Player					Bundesliga		DFB-Pokal		Totals	
Player	Nat.	Birthday	at FCN since	Previous club	Matches	Goals	Matches	Goal	Matches	Goals
Goalkeepers
Andreas Köpke	German	12 March 1962	1986	Hertha BSC	32	0	2	0	34	0
Manfred Müller	German	28 July 1947	1986	Bayern Munich	1	0	0	0	1	0
Rainer Stumptner	German	7 July 1964	1986		1	0	1	0	2	0
Herbert Heider	German	21 September 1959	1983	Stuttgarter Kickers	0	0	0	0	0	0
Defenders
Thomas Brunner	German	10 August 1962	1980	—	30	0	1	0	31	0
Anders Giske	Norwegian	22 November 1959	1985	Bayer Leverkusen	31	1	2	0	33	1
Roland Grahammer	German	3 November 1963	1983	FC Augsburg	20	6	2	3	22	9
Günter Güttler	German	31 May 1961	1984	Bayern Munich	19	0	2	1	21	1
Hans-Jürgen Heidenreich	German	17 August 1967	1986		2	0	0	0	2	0
Joachim Philipkowski	German	26 February 1961	1985	FC St. Pauli	30	6	2	0	32	6
Stefan Reuter	German	16 October 1966	1982	TSV Dinkelsbühl	33	6	2	1	35	7
Ludwig Martin	German	29 July 1961	1986		0	0	0	0	0	0
Midfielders
Hans-Jürgen Brunner	German	2 February 1965	1984		23	2	1	0	24	0
Reiner Geyer	German	20 April 1964	1983		18	4	0	0	18	4
Stefan Jambo	German	2 August 1958	1986	1. FC Saarbrücken	4	1	1	0	5	0
Dieter Lieberwirth	German	13 January 1954	1975	—	30	4	1	0	31	4
Frank Lippmann	German	23 April 1961	1986		6	0	0	0	6	0
Frank Nitsche	German	18 March 1964	1984		7	0	1	0	8	0
Manfred Schwabl	German	18 April 1966	1986	Bayern Munich	33	1	2	0	35	1
Norbert Wagner	German	12 April 1961	1984		25	0	1	2	26	2
Achim Wilbois	German	15 June 1963	1986		9	2	2	0	11	0
Forwards
Jørn Andersen	Norwegian	3 February 1963	1985	Vålerenga IF	29	14	1	2	30	16
Dieter Eckstein	German	12 March 1964	1984		25	10	2	1	27	11
Rudolf Stenzel	German	21 June 1960	1984		15	5	0	0	15	5
