= 1. FC Nürnberg II =

- Full name: 1. Fußball-Club Nürnberg Verein für Leibesübungen e. V.
- Nickname: Der Club
- Founded: 4 May 1900
- Ground: Max-Morlock-Platz (7,000 capacity) Max-Morlock-Stadion (50,000 capacity)
- Manager: Andreas Wolf
- League: Regionalliga Bayern (IV)
- 2025–26: Regionalliga Bayern, 1st of 18
Home colours	Away colours	Third colours

1. FC Nürnberg II is the reserve team of German football club 1. FC Nürnberg, from the city of Nuremberg, Bavaria.

Until 2005, the team played under the name of 1. FC Nürnberg Amateure.

== History ==
=== 1955–1963 ===
Nürnberg's amateur team first won promotion to Bavarias highest football league, then the tier-three Amateurliga Nordbayern, in 1955, when it took out the title in the 2. Amateurliga Mittelfranken-Süd and came second in the following promotion round. The Amateurliga Nordbayern was then one of two leagues at this level in Bavaria, covering the northern half of the state while the Amateurliga Südbayern existed in parallel in the south.

1. FC Nürnberg Amateure, as the team was then known as, was the first reserve side to reach this level, pre-dating the FC Bayern Munich II by a year. The team finished in sixth place out of fourteen in its first year in the third division. It dropped to thirteenth in the following year, three points save of relegation. After an eighth place in 1957–58, a fourteenth the following season meant relegation back to the fourth division. The team remained at this level until 1963, when, in the reorganisation of the German football league system, it became part of the new tier-four Landesliga Bayern-Mitte.

=== 1963 to 1973 ===
After coming fifth in the Landesliga in 1963–64, the team won the league the season after and earned promotion to the Amateurliga Bayern, now operating as a single division and statewide. In this league, commonly referred to as the Bayernliga, it managed a second place in its first year there, two points behind champions BC Augsburg. As the third division was the highest league reserve teams were permitted in Germany, Nürnberg could not have been promoted anyway, even if it had won the league.

The team's performances gradually fell off, year-by-year, finishing fifth, seventh, tenth and thirteenth until 1970. In the 1969–70 season, it escaped relegation by only two points. Nuremberg continued to struggle against relegation and, in 1973, finished last in the league, fourteen points clear of salvation.

=== 1973–1987 ===
Back in the Landesliga, the team played as an upper-table side, improving again season-by-season. The 1977–78 season was a step backwards however, with the side finishing eleventh and only one point clear of a relegation rank. While the following year was an improvement, 1979–80 became an outstanding one, winning the league and promotion by earning 61 of a possible 68 points.

In a repeat of 1965–66, the team once more finished runners-up in the league in its first year back, this time to MTV Ingolstadt. Decline came much quicker this time, the side struggling against relegation from then on and by 1983, Nürnberg was relegated again. It won the Landesliga title once more the year after and returned to the Bayernliga.

The team spend the next three seasons at this level before suffering another relegation in 1987, when it finished last. One place and one point above it, the senior team of local rival SpVgg Fürth went down alongside.

=== 1987–1998 ===
A considerably longer spell of Landesliga football followed now for the side. In 1990–91, it finished on top of the table, on equal points with SpVgg Fürth, losing the following championship decider. In the following promotion round, which it was qualified for as the runners-up, it lost 1–0 to Landesliga Bayern-Süd runners-up FC Gundelfingen, condemning the team to stay in the Landesliga. In most other seasons before and after, the team finished in sixth and seventh place. In 1996, with the relegation of Nürnberg's first team to the third division for the first time in its history, the side was renamed 1. FC Nürnberg II, since the first team was not playing in a fully professional league anymore and was therefore considered Amateure themselves. This lasted for only one season, 1. FCN returning to the 2. Bundesliga in 1997. Its reserve team followed this upward trend the year after, finishing second in the league and advancing through the promotion round.

=== 1998–2008 ===
The team returned to the Bayernliga, now only the fourth tier of the league system, as a more competitive side then when it left eleven years before, finishing seventh in its first year there. It continued to be an upper-table side for the years to come, finishing second three times, in 2001, 2004 and 2006. In 2001, it was only one win away from winning the championship and promotion, finishing three points behind fellow Middle Franconian club SpVgg Ansbach.

In 2004, TSV 1860 Munich II beat them by a point, while, in 2006, an eleven points gap to champions FC Ingolstadt 04 was a much more obvious result.

In 2005, 1. FC Nürnberg Amateure was permanently renamed 1. FC Nürnberg II, as were all reserve sides of first and second Bundesliga teams.

In the 2007–08 season, the team finished third, becoming one of six Bayernliga clubs to be promoted to the Regionalliga Süd in the league reform that went alongside the creation of the 3. Liga.

=== 2008–present ===
From 2008 onwards, 1. FCN II played in the tier-four Regionalliga Süd. After four seasons in this league with a second place in 2009–10 as the best result the club became part of the newly formed Regionalliga Bayern in 2012. In its first two seasons there the club finished fourth and eighth respectively.

== Honours ==
- Regionalliga Bayern (IV)
  - Champions: 2026
- Regionalliga Süd (IV)
  - Runners-up: 2010
- Bayernliga (III-IV)
  - Runners-up: (5) 1966, 1981, 2001, 2004, 2006
- Landesliga Bayern-Mitte (IV)
  - Champions: (3) 1965, 1980, 1984
  - Runners-up: (2) 1991, 1998
- 2nd Amateurliga Mittelfranken Süd (IV)
  - Champions: (2) 1955, 1963
- Mittelfranken Cup
  - Winner: (3) 1995, 2001, 2006

== Current squad ==
As of 5 February 2026

Note: Flags indicate national team as defined under FIFA eligibility rules; some limited exceptions apply. Players may hold more than one non-FIFA nationality.

No.	Pos.	Nation	Player
1	GK	GER	Leon Kickler
3	DF	GER	Leonard Gjini
4	DF	PLE	Khalid Abu El Haija
5	DF	GER	Fabian Menig (captain)
6	MF	GER	Pascal Fuchs
8	MF	GER	Ben Hagmeyer
9	FW	GER	Levin Chiumento
10	MF	GER	Benedikt Kirsch
11	MF	GER	Luca Horst
16	MF	GER	David Klos
17	MF	GER	Moritz Wiezorrek
18	FW	GER	Luca Schulten
19	DF	GER	Benjamin Eichner
20	FW	GER	Eliyah Rau
21	MF	GER	Nizar Üstel

No.	Pos.	Nation	Player
22	DF	GER	Noel Kaiser
24	DF	GER	Tobias Heß
25	MF	KOS	Lion Haxhiu
26	GK	POL	Robin Lisewski
29	FW	SYR	Can Moustfa
30	DF	GER	Kirubel Taye
31	GK	GER	Lennart Pohlmann
33	GK	KOS	Lindsay Gutaj
35	MF	GER	Marc Kornwachs Barjuan
39	FW	GER	Joel Skowronek
48	MF	GER	Marko Soldić
49	DF	GER	Farid Maboa Dibamba
96	GK	GER	Felix Kielkopf
—	MF	GER	Edwin Kracht

=== Out on loan ===
Note: Flags indicate national team as defined under FIFA eligibility rules; some limited exceptions apply. Players may hold more than one non-FIFA nationality.

No.	Pos.	Nation	Player
7	FW	CRO	Tino Kusanović (at SV Ried until 30 June 2027)

== Recent managers ==
Recent managers of the club:

Manager	Start	Finish
Dieter Nüssing	1 July 1998	30 June 2002
Alois Reinhardt	1 July 2002	22 April 2005
Dieter Nüssing	23 April 2005	30 June 2005
Peter Zeidler	1 July 2005	30 June 2007
René Müller	1 July 2007	10 April 2011
Pellegrino Matarazzo	11 April 2011	30 June 2011
Michael Wiesinger	1 July 2011	23 December 2012
Dieter Nüssing Michael Wimmer	6 January 2013	21 June 2013
Roger Prinzen	21 June 2013	6 October 2013
Roger Prinzen	22 October 2013	22 April 2014
Daniel Klewer	23 April 2014	30 June 2014
Roger Prinzen	1 July 2014	30 June 2016
Michael Köllner	1 July 2016	6 March 2017
Fabian Adelmann	7 March 2017	30 June 2017
Reiner Geyer	1 July 2017	28 October 2018
Fabian Adelmann	29 October 2018	30 June 2019
Marek Mintál	1 July 2019	5 November 2019
Marek Mintál	14 November 2019	30 June 2021
Cristian Fiél	1 July 2021	19 February 2023
Vincent Novák	20 February 2023	30 June 2023
Andreas Wolf	1 July 2023	Present

== Recent seasons ==
The recent season-by-season performance of the club:

Season	Division	Tier	Position
1999–2000	Bayernliga	IV	5th
2000–01	Bayernliga	IV	2nd
2001–02	Bayernliga	IV	3rd
2002–03	Bayernliga	IV	6th
2003–04	Bayernliga	IV	2nd
2004–05	Bayernliga	IV	4th
2005–06	Bayernliga	IV	2nd
2006–07	Bayernliga	IV	6th
2007–08	Bayernliga	IV	3rd ↑
2008–09	Regionalliga Süd	IV	5th
2009–10	Regionalliga Süd	IV	2nd
2010–11	Regionalliga Süd	IV	11th
2011–12	Regionalliga Süd	IV	10th
2012–13	Regionalliga Bayern	IV	4th
2013–14	Regionalliga Bayern	IV	8th
2014–15	Regionalliga Bayern	IV	8th
2015–16	Regionalliga Bayern	IV	3rd
2016–17	Regionalliga Bayern	IV	7th
2017–18	Regionalliga Bayern	IV	5th
2018–19	Regionalliga Bayern	IV	5th
2019–21	Regionalliga Bayern	IV	2nd
2021–22	Regionalliga Bayern	IV	11th
2022–23	Regionalliga Bayern	IV	4th
2023–24	Regionalliga Bayern	IV	3rd
2024–25	Regionalliga Bayern	IV	11th
2025–26	Regionalliga Bayern	IV	1st

- With the introduction of the Bezirksoberligas in 1988 as the new fifth tier, below the Landesligas, all leagues below dropped one tier. With the introduction of the Regionalligas in 1994 and the 3. Liga in 2008 as the new third tier, below the 2. Bundesliga, all leagues below dropped one tier. With the establishment of the Regionalliga Bayern as the new fourth tier in Bavaria in 2012 the Bayernliga was split into a northern and a southern division, the number of Landesligas expanded from three to five and the Bezirksoberligas abolished. All leagues from the Bezirksligas onward were elevated one tier.

↑ Promoted	↓ Relegated

== DFB Cup appearances ==
The club has qualified for the first round of the German Cup a number of times. Since 2008 however, reserve teams are not eligible to compete in the German Cup anymore:

Season	Round	Date	Home	Away	Result	Attendance
DFB-Pokal 1979–80	First round	25 August 1979	TuS Schloß Neuhaus	1. FC Nürnberg II	3–2	
DFB-Pokal 1981–82	First round	28 August 1981	SSV Ulm 1846	1. FC Nürnberg II	1–1	
DFB-Pokal 1981–82	First round replay	8 September 1981	1. FC Nürnberg II	SSV Ulm 1846	1–3	
DFB-Pokal 1984–85	First round	1 September 1984	1. FC Nürnberg II	SV Südwest Ludwigshafen	1–0	
DFB-Pokal 1984–85	Second round	13 October 1984	1. FC Nürnberg II	SC Jülich 1910	0–3	
DFB-Pokal 1995–96	First round	26 August 1995	1. FC Nürnberg II	Borussia Mönchengladbach	0–3	
