= 1932–33 Bezirksliga Bayern =

Bezirksliga Bayern
- Season: 1932–33
- Champions: North: 1. FC Nürnberg; South: FC Bayern Munich
- German championship: SV 1860 München

The 1932–33 Bezirksliga Bayern was the tenth and last season of the league, one of the eight Bezirksligas in Southern Germany at the time. It was the first tier of the football league system in Bavaria (German:Bayern) from 1923 to 1933. The league was organised in two regional divisions, north and south, with the best two teams from each qualified for the Southern German championship.

The southern division was won by FC Bayern Munich, the 1932 German champions. For Bayern it was the sixth consecutive title in the southern division and seventh Bezirksliga title over all. In the northern division 1. FC Nürnberg won its sixth Bezirksliga title. The two league champions and the runners-up SpVgg Fürth and SV 1860 München qualified for the 1933 Southern German championship where they played in a group with the best four teams of the Bezirksliga Rhein-Saar. The four Bavarian clubs took up top spot in this group and the group winner, SV 1860 München, qualified for the championship final where it lost 1–0 to FSV Frankfurt.

Frankfurt and SV 1860 then qualified for the 1933 German football championship where the latter reached the semi-finals where it lost 4–0 to FC Schalke 04.

The 1932–33 marked the end of the Bezirksliga as the top tier in Southern Germany and Bavaria as well as the end of the Southern German championship. The league was replaced by the Gauliga Bayern, one of 16 Gauligas in Germany from 1933 onward, introduced after the rise of the Nazis to power in 1933. Twelve clubs from the two Bezirksligas qualified for the new Gauliga Bayern while the two clubs from Ulm, located in Württemberg, were moved to the new Gauliga Württemberg.

== League tables ==
The 1932–33 season saw two new clubs in the league, Germania Nürnberg and SpVgg Erlangen.

Pos	Team	Pld	W	D	L	GF	GA	GD	Pts	Promotion, qualification or relegation
1	1. FC Nürnberg (C)	18	17	1	0	68	19	+49	35	Qualification to Southern German championship & Gauliga Bayern
2	SpVgg Fürth	18	13	2	3	60	18	+42	28	Qualification to Southern German championship & Gauliga Bayern
3	1. FC Schweinfurt 05	18	12	1	5	30	20	+10	25	Qualification to Gauliga Bayern
4	1. FC Bayreuth	18	8	3	7	32	43	−11	19	Qualification to Gauliga Bayern
5	ASV Nürnberg	18	9	0	9	41	37	+4	18	Qualification to Gauliga Bayern
6	VfR Fürth	18	8	2	8	34	39	−5	18	
7	Würzburger FV 04	18	6	3	9	49	48	+1	15	Qualification to Gauliga Bayern
8	SC Germania Nürnberg	18	3	4	11	29	43	−14	10	
9	Würzburger Kickers	18	3	2	13	27	51	−24	8	
10	SpVgg Erlangen	18	2	0	16	20	72	−52	4	

Source: claudionicoletti.eu
Rules for classification: 1) Points;
(C) Champions

== Table ==
The 1932–33 season saw two new clubs in the league, FV Ulm and SpVgg Landshut.

Pos	Team	Pld	W	D	L	GF	GA	GD	Pts	Promotion, qualification or relegation
1	FC Bayern Munich (C)	18	13	4	1	63	14	+49	30	Qualification to Southern German championship & Gauliga Bayern
2	SV 1860 München	18	10	3	5	62	28	+34	23	Qualification to Southern German championship & Gauliga Bayern
3	DSV München (Note: DSV München and Teutonia München merged after the 1932–33 season to form 1. FC München)	18	7	4	7	39	42	−3	18	Qualification to Gauliga Bayern
4	Ulmer FV 1894	18	7	4	7	40	43	−3	18	Qualification to Gauliga Württemberg
5	1. SSV Ulm	18	6	5	7	35	45	−10	17	Qualification to Gauliga Württemberg
6	FC Wacker München	18	5	6	7	28	34	−6	16	Qualification to Gauliga Bayern
7	Schwaben Augsburg	18	6	4	8	37	44	−7	16	Qualification to Gauliga Bayern
8	FC Teutonia München	18	6	4	8	22	30	−8	16	
9	Jahn Regensburg	18	3	7	8	25	27	−2	13	Qualification to Gauliga Bayern
10	SpVgg Landshut	18	5	3	10	27	71	−44	13	

Source: claudionicoletti.eu
Rules for classification: 1) Points;
(C) Champions
