= Norbert Wagner (footballer) =

German footballer

Personal information
- Date of birth: 12 April 1961 (age 65)
- Place of birth: Sulzbach, West Germany
- Height: 1.73 m (5 ft 8 in)
- Position: Defender

Senior career*
Years	Team	Apps	(Gls)
1980–1984	1. FC Amberg		
1984–1989	1. FC Nürnberg		
1989–1990	Blau-Weiß 90 Berlin		
1990–1991	SpVgg Bayreuth		
1991–1992	1. FC Nürnberg II		
- * Club domestic league appearances and goals

Norbert Wagner (born 12 April 1961) is a retired German football defender.
