= Marko Soldić =

German footballer (born 2010)

Personal information
- Date of birth: 6 January 2010 (age 16)
- Place of birth: Nuremberg, Germany
- Height: 1.79 m (5 ft 10 in)
- Position: Midfielder

Team information
- Current team: 1. FC Nürnberg
- Number: 16

Youth career
- –2018: Greuther Fürth
- 2018–: 1. FC Nürnberg

Senior career*
Years	Team	Apps	(Gls)
2026–	1. FC Nürnberg	8	(0)
2026–	1. FC Nürnberg II	6	(3)

International career^{‡}
2025	Germany U15	2	(0)
2025–	Germany U16	7	(2)
2026–	Germany U17	4	(1)
- * Club domestic league appearances and goals as of 17 October 2026 ‡ National team caps and goals as of 11 November 2026

Marko Soldić (born 6 January 2010) is a German professional footballer who plays as a midfielder for 2. Bundesliga club 1. FC Nürnberg.

== Club career ==
Soldić is a youth product of Greuther Fürth and 1. FC Nürnberg, which he joined as an under-9.

While still only 15, he started training with the first team under head coach Miroslav Klose in January 2026, making his unofficial debut in a 7–1 friendly win against Swiss Super League club Grasshopper.

Soldić made his professional debut with 1. FC Nürnberg in a 5–1 win 2. Bundesliga match over Karlsruher SC on 13 February 2026. At the age of 16 years and 38 days, he became the second youngest player in the history of the league behind only Kennet Eichhorn (who was 16 years and 14 days), and the youngest professional player in the history of the club.

In March 2026, he signed his first professional contract with 1. FC Nürnberg.

== International career ==
Born in Nuremberg, Germany, and of Croatian descent, Soldić is a youth international for Germany, first getting called to the under-15 in February, along with several fellow Croatia-eligible youngster Niko Iličević, Filip Pavić, David Balukčić and Gabriel Minutillo. He later became a regular for Germany under-16.
