= Armin Reutershahn =

German football coach and manager (born 1960)

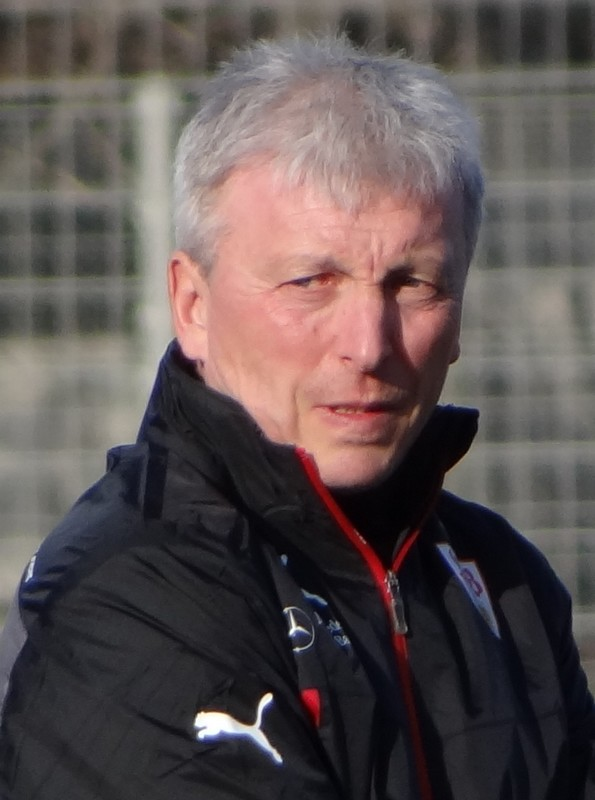
- Reutershahn

Personal information
- Full name: Armin Reutershahn
- Date of birth: 1 March 1960 (age 66)
- Place of birth: Duisburg, West Germany
- Position: Goalkeeper

Youth career
- Years: Team
- Preussen Krefeld
- TuS Xanten
- VfB Homberg

Managerial career
- 1996: Bayer Uerdingen (caretaker)
- 2012–2013: 1. FC Nürnberg

Armin Reutershahn (born 1 March 1960) is a German football coach and manager. He was most recently an assistant coach with Borussia Dortmund.

== Playing career ==
Reutershahn played in his active career for Preussen Krefeld, TuS Xanten and VfB Homberg as a midfielder.

== Coaching career ==
Reutershahn began his coaching career as assistant coach by Bayer Uerdingen and was a short time in the 1995–96 season Caretaker Head Coach of the club. After the relegation was moving back as assistant coach of Bayer Uerdingen and signed in summer 1997 a contract as assistant coach of Hamburger SV. Reutershan was than for six years assistant coach of the Hamburger SV and was named after one year without a job as assistant of Friedhelm Funkel at Eintracht Frankfurt. After the resigning of Funkel, Reutershahn left the club and signed a contract as assistant manager with 1. FC Nürnberg.

Following the departure of Nürnberg's manager Dieter Hecking in December 2012, Reutershahn took charge of the Bundesliga team along with Michael Wiesinger. On 7 October 2013, the duo was dismissed after a 5–0 defeat against Hamburger SV.

On 10 March 2014, Reutershahn became assistant manager of VfB Stuttgart.

== Personal ==
His son Yannick plays for TuRa Harksheide, his daughter Larissa is an Equestrianism and his wife is former swimmer Beate was member of the 1976 Summer Olympics team in Montreal
