= Dominik Schmitt =

German footballer

Personal information
- Date of birth: 7 April 1992 (age 34)
- Place of birth: Bamberg, Germany
- Height: 1.78 m (5 ft 10 in)
- Position: Midfielder

Youth career
- SV Hallstadt
- 1. FC Oberhaid
- –2010: 1. FC Nürnberg
- 2010–2011: Greuther Fürth

Senior career*
Years	Team	Apps	(Gls)
2011–2012	Greuther Fürth II	15	(0)
2012–2013	VfL Frohnlach	35	(3)
2013–2014	FC Ingolstadt II	32	(2)
2014–2015	Eintracht Bamberg	33	(3)
2015–2018	SpVgg Bayreuth	99	(13)
2017	SpVgg Bayreuth II	1	(0)
2018	Türkgücü-Ataspor München	15	(4)
2019	SHB Danang	11	(2)
Total		241	(27)
- * Club domestic league appearances and goals

Dominik Schmitt (born 7 April 1992) is a German former professional footballer who played as a midfielder.
