= 1933–34 Gauliga Bayern =

Gauliga Bayern
- Season: 1933–34
- Champions: 1. FC Nürnberg
- Relegated: 1. FC Bayreuth; FV Würzburg 04; 1. FC München
- German championship: 1. FC Nürnberg

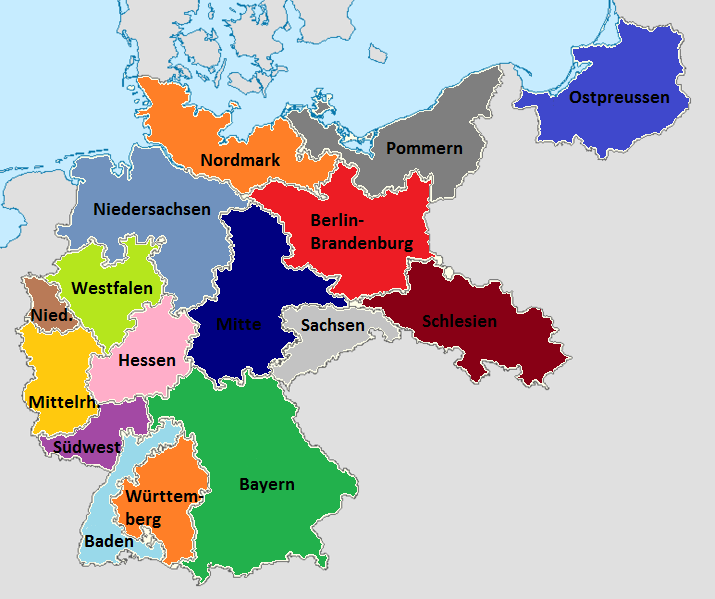
The initial 16 districts of the Gauliga with Bayern in green

The 1933–34 Gauliga Bayern was the inaugural season of the league, one of the 16 Gauligas in Germany at the time. It was the first tier of the football league system in Bavaria (German:Bayern) from 1933 to 1945. The Gauliga Bayern had replaced the Bezirksliga Bayern which had been played in two divisions, north and south, as the top tier of football in Bavaria at the end of the 1932–33 seasons.

The Gauligas in Germany replaced the seven regional championships and a large number of local leagues that existed in Germany until then and were established after the rise of the Nazis to power in 1933.

The league champions 1. FC Nürnberg qualified for the 1934 German football championship, where it finished first in its group with Dresdner SC, Borussia Fulda and Wacker Halle and qualified for the semi-finals. After defeating Viktoria 89 Berlin 2–1 Nürnberg advanced to the final where it lost 2–1 to FC Schalke 04. For 1. FC Nürnberg it was the seventh time the club reached the final and the first time it lost, having won five national championships from 1920 to 1927 and also participated in the inconclusive 1922 final. For Nürnberg it was the first of seven Gauliga championships the club would win in the era from 1933 to 1944.

After attempts to establish professionalism in German football in 1932 the rise of the Nazis to power put a sudden end to this, forcing all football leagues in Germany, including the Gauligas, to remain strictly amateur. The new political situation in Germany at the time of the introduction of the Gauligas, the Nazis having come to power, also meant that Jewish players and officials were no longer permitted to take part in German sport clubs. For Gauliga clubs like FC Bayern Munich, taunted as Judenklub, this meant it lost important figures that had built the club up to win its first German championship in 1932. After president Kurt Landauer and coach Richard Dombi had to leave the club because of their Jewish background, the club declined.

== Table ==
The 1933–34 season was the inaugural season of the league with all clubs coming from the two regional divisions of the Bezirksliga Bayern.

Pos	Team	Pld	W	D	L	GF	GA	GD	Pts	Promotion, qualification or relegation
1	1. FC Nürnberg (C)	22	15	4	3	61	26	+35	34	Qualification to German championship
2	TSV 1860 München (Note: TV München 1860 and SV 1860 München merged on 13 March 1934 to form TSV 1860 München)	22	13	7	2	48	15	+33	33	
3	FC Bayern Munich	22	11	5	6	53	35	+18	27	
4	1. FC Schweinfurt 05	22	11	4	7	38	37	+1	26	
5	Schwaben Augsburg	22	10	5	7	45	38	+7	25	
6	SpVgg Fürth	22	8	6	8	41	32	+9	22	
7	ASV Nürnberg	22	8	4	10	38	38	0	20	
8	SSV Jahn Regensburg (Note: Sportbund Jahn Regensburg merged on 24 May 1934 with Schwimmverein Regensburg and SV 1889 Regensburg to form SSV Jahn Regensburg)	22	7	5	10	36	43	−7	19	
9	FC Wacker München	22	7	4	11	36	50	−14	18	
10	1. FC Bayreuth (R)	22	5	7	10	31	52	−21	17	Relegation
11	FV Würzburg 04 (R)	22	4	5	13	27	55	−28	13	Relegation
12	1. FC München (Note: 1. FC München was formed in a merger of DSV München and Teutonia München after the 1932–33 season) (R)	22	3	4	15	26	59	−33	10	Relegation

Source: claudionicoletti.eu
Rules for classification: 1) Points;
(C) Champions; (R) Relegated
