= Dieter Renner =

German footballer and coach

Personal information
- Date of birth: 18 December 1949
- Place of birth: Giengen, West Germany
- Date of death: 28 May 1998 (aged 48)
- Place of death: Ruit auf den Fildern, Germany
- Positions: Midfielder; defender

Senior career*
Years	Team	Apps	(Gls)
1972–1980	Stuttgarter Kickers	190	(15)

Managerial career
- 1984–1987: Stuttgarter Kickers
- 1987–1989: Kickers Offenbach
- 1989–1990: SV Darmstadt 98
- 1991–1994: 1. FC Nürnberg (assistant)
- 1993–1994: 1. FC Nürnberg
- * Club domestic league appearances and goals

Dieter Renner (18 December 1949 in Giengen – 28 May 1998 in Ruit auf den Fildern) was a German football player and coach.

== Honours ==
=== As a coach ===
- DFB-Pokal finalist: 1986–87
