= Bezirksliga Bayern =

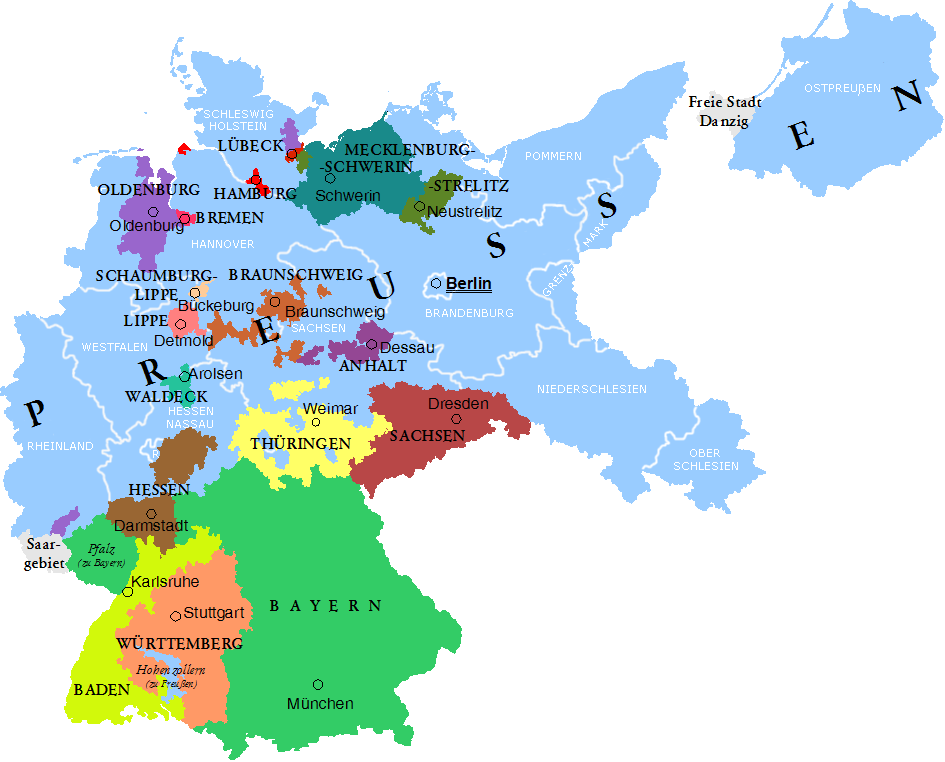
- Founded: 1923
- Folded: 1933
- Replaced by: Gauliga Bayern
- Country: Germany
- State: Bavaria
- Level on pyramid: Level 1
- Last champions: North: 1. FC Nürnberg South: FC Bayern Munich (1932–33)

The Bezirksliga Bayern was the highest association football league in the German state of Bavaria from 1923 to 1933. The league was disbanded with the rise of the Nazis to power in 1933.

== Overview ==
The league was formed in 1923, after a league reform which was decided upon in Darmstadt, Hesse.

Until the introduction of the Bezirksliga, the Kreisliga Südbayern and Kreisliga Nordbayern were the highest leagues in the state.

The league started out with eight clubs from all over the state of Bavaria, but without any teams from the Palatinate region (German:Pfalz), then politically a part of Bavaria but not geographically connected to the rest of the state. The eight clubs played each other in a home-and-away round with the two top teams advancing to the Southern German championship, which in turn was a qualification tournament for the German championship.

In its second season, the league started to incooperate clubs from the city of Ulm, Württemberg, which lies right across the border from Bavaria. Otherwise, the modus of the league remained unchanged but only the league champion qualified for the Southern German finals in this season.

For the 1926–27 season, the league was expanded to ten teams. The top team was again qualified for the finals. Additionally, the SpVgg Fürth as Southern German cup winner also qualified for this round. The runners-up of the Bezirksligas in the south also played a championship round to determine a third team from the region to go to the German finals.

After this season, the league was split into a northern and a southern group, the north having nine and the south seven teams. The winner of each division would advance to the Southern German finals while the two runners-up again played in a separate round like in the previous season.

The 1928–29 season saw no change in modus but both leagues now operated on a strength of eight clubs. The qualification system for the finals also remained unchanged. This system remained in place until 1931.

For the 1931–32 season, both divisions were expanded to ten teams. The top-two teams from each league then advanced to the Southern German finals, which were now staged in two regional groups with a finals game between the two group winners at the end. The same system applied for the final season of the league in 1932–33.

With the rise of the Nazis to power, the Gauligas were introduced as the highest football leagues in Germany. In Bavaria, the Gauliga Bayern replaced the Bezirksliga Bayern as the highest level of play. The twelve best teams from Bavaria qualified for this new, statewide league.

== National success ==
The clubs from the Bezirksliga Bayern were among the most successful in Germany in this era, specifically the 1. FC Nürnberg.

=== Southern German championship ===
Qualified teams and their success:

- 1924:
  - SpVgg Fürth, Runners-up
  - 1. FC Nürnberg, Southern German champions
- 1925:
  - 1. FC Nürnberg, Runners-up
- 1926:
  - SpVgg Fürth, Runners-up
  - FC Bayern Munich, Southern German champions
- 1927:
  - TSV 1860 Munich, Winner of the Bezirksliga-runners-up round
  - SpVgg Fürth, Runners-up
  - 1. FC Nürnberg, Southern German champions
- 1928:
  - VfR Fürth, 7th place in the Bezirksliga-runners-up round southwest division
  - TSV 1860 Munich, 3rd place in the Bezirksliga-runners-up round southwest division
  - 1. FC Nürnberg, 2nd place in the Bezirksliga-runners-up round southwest division
  - Wacker München, Winner of the Bezirksliga-runners-up round southwest division, winner division final
  - SpVgg Fürth, 3rd place
  - FC Bayern Munich, Southern German champions
- 1929:
  - ASV Nürnberg, 7th place in the Bezirksliga-runners-up round southwest division
  - TSV 1860 Munich, 3rd place in the Bezirksliga-runners-up round southwest division
  - TSV Schwaben Augsburg, 2nd place in the Bezirksliga-runners-up round southwest division
  - SpVgg Fürth, Winner of the Bezirksliga-runners-up round southwest division, winner division final
  - FC Bayern Munich, Runners-up
  - 1. FC Nürnberg, Southern German champions
- 1930:
  - Jahn Regensburg, 6th place in the Bezirksliga-runners-up round southwest division
  - ASV Nürnberg, 5th place in the Bezirksliga-runners-up round southwest division
  - TSV 1860 Munich, 2nd place in the Bezirksliga-runners-up round southwest division
  - 1. FC Nürnberg, Winner of the Bezirksliga-runners-up round southwest division, winner division final
  - FC Bayern Munich, 3rd place
  - SpVgg Fürth, Runners-up
- 1931:
  - VfR Fürth, 6th place in the Bezirksliga-runners-up round southwest division
  - TSV Schwaben Augsburg, 3rd place in the Bezirksliga-runners-up round southwest division
  - 1. FC Nürnberg, 2nd place in the Bezirksliga-runners-up round southwest division
  - TSV 1860 Munich, Winner of the Bezirksliga-runners-up round southwest division, winner division final
  - FC Bayern Munich, 3rd place
  - SpVgg Fürth, Southern German champions
- 1932:
  - TSV 1860 Munich, 6th place southwest division
  - SpVgg Fürth, 5th place southwest division
  - 1. FC Nürnberg, 2nd place southwest division, 3rd place Southern German championship
  - FC Bayern Munich, Winner southwest division, Runners-up Southern German championship
- 1933:
  - FC Bayern Munich, 4th place eastwest division
  - 1. FC Nürnberg, 3rd place eastwest division
  - SpVgg Fürth, 2nd place eastwest division, 4th place in Southern German championship
  - TSV 1860 Munich, Winner eastwest division, Runners-up Southern German championship

=== German championship ===
Qualified teams and their success:

- 1924:
  - 1. FC Nürnberg, German champions
- 1925:
  - 1. FC Nürnberg, German champions
- 1926:
  - FC Bayern Munich, First round
  - SpVgg Fürth, German champions
- 1927:
  - TSV 1860 Munich, Semi-finals
  - SpVgg Fürth, Semi-finals
  - 1. FC Nürnberg, German champions
- 1928:
  - FC Bayern Munich, Semi-finals
  - Wacker München, Semi-finals
- 1929:
  - FC Bayern Munich, Quarter-finals
  - 1. FC Nürnberg, Semi-finals
  - SpVgg Fürth, German champions
- 1930:
  - SpVgg Fürth, Quarter-finals
  - 1. FC Nürnberg, Semi-finals
- 1931:
  - SpVgg Fürth, Quarter-finals
  - TSV 1860 Munich, Final
- 1932:
  - 1. FC Nürnberg, Semi-finals
  - FC Bayern Munich, German champions
- 1933:
  - TSV 1860 Munich, Semi-finals

== Founding members of the league ==
The league was formed from eight clubs from Bavaria:

- 1. FC Nürnberg
- SpVgg Fürth
- FC Bayern Munich
- FV Nürnberg
- TSV 1860 Munich
- Wacker München
- VfR Fürth
- TSV Schwaben Augsburg

== Winners and runners-up of the Bezirksliga Bayern ==
Season	Winner	Runner-Up
1923–24	1. FC Nürnberg	SpVgg Fürth
1924–25	1. FC Nürnberg	SpVgg Fürth
1925–26	FC Bayern Munich	1. FC Nürnberg
1926–27	1. FC Nürnberg	TSV 1860 Munich

Season	North	South
1927–28	SpVgg Fürth	FC Bayern Munich
1928–29	1. FC Nürnberg	FC Bayern Munich
1929–30	SpVgg Fürth	FC Bayern Munich
1930–31	SpVgg Fürth	FC Bayern Munich
1931–32	1. FC Nürnberg	FC Bayern Munich
1932–33	1. FC Nürnberg	FC Bayern Munich

== Placings in the Bezirksliga Bayern 1923–33 ==
=== Clubs from the northern division ===
Club	1924	1925	1926	1927	1928	1929	1930	1931	1932	1933
1. FC Nürnberg	1	1	2	1	2	1	2	2	1	1
SpVgg Fürth	2	2	3	4	1	2	1	1	2	2
FC Schweinfurt 05									4	3
1. FC Bayreuth				9	6	7	6	8	7	4
ASV Nürnberg	4	6	4	6	5	3	3	6	3	5
VfR Fürth	7		7	7	3	4	7	3	5	6
FV Würzburg 04					4	5	5	5	8	7
Germania Nürnberg										8
Kickers Würzburg								7	6	9
SpVgg Erlangen										10
SpVgg Weiden									9	
Bayern Hof					7	6	4	4	10	
SpVgg Hof							8			
Franken Nürnberg						8				
FSV Nürnberg					8					
FC Fürth				8	9					

Source:"Bezirksliga Bayern". Das deutsche Fussball-Archiv.

- The FV Nürnberg joined the ASV Nürnberg in 1925.

=== Clubs from the southern division ===
Club	1924	1925	1926	1927	1928	1929	1930	1931	1932	1933
FC Bayern Munich	3	4	1	5	1	1	1	1	1	1
TSV 1860 Munich	5	5	5	2	2	3	3	2	2	2
FV Ulm							8			3
Wacker München	6	3	6	3	3	4	4	5	5	4
SSV Ulm									6	5
DSV München					5	6	6	8	7	6
TSV Schwaben Augsburg	8		8	10	6	2	5	3	8	7
Teutonia München		8				7	7	6	3	8
SpVgg Landshut										9
Jahn Regensburg					4	5	2	4	4	10
VfB Ingolstadt-Ringsee								7	9	
FC Straubing									10	
Schwaben Ulm		7			7	8				

Source:"Bezirksliga Bayern". Das deutsche Fussball-Archiv.
