= Joachim Philipkowski =

German footballer and coach

Personal information
- Date of birth: 26 February 1961 (age 65)
- Place of birth: Mrągowo, Poland
- Height: 1.84 m (6 ft 0 in)
- Positions: Midfielder; forward

Team information
- Current team: FC St. Pauli (youth team manager)

Youth career
- –1977: HSV Barmbek-Uhlenhorst
- 1977–1979: FC St. Pauli

Senior career*
Years	Team	Apps	(Gls)
1979–1984	FC St. Pauli II		
1984–1985	FC St. Pauli	33	(3)
1985–1992	1. FC Nürnberg	154	(13)
1992–1994	FC St. Pauli	15	(0)

Managerial career
- 2002: FC St. Pauli (assistant)
- 2002: FC St. Pauli
- 2003–2004: Werder Bremen (youth)
- 2004–2005: Hamburger SV II
- 2007–2009: FC St. Pauli II
- 2009–: FC St. Pauli (youth)
- * Club domestic league appearances and goals

Joachim Philipkowski (born 26 February 1961 in Mrągowo, Poland) is a German football coach and a former player who manages the youth team of FC St. Pauli.
