= Roger Prinzen =

German footballer (1969–2026)

Personal information
- Date of birth: 4 March 1969
- Place of birth: Darmstadt, West Germany
- Date of death: 13 April 2026 (aged 57)
- Height: 1.87 m (6 ft 2 in)
- Position: Defender

Senior career*
Years	Team	Apps	(Gls)
1987–1991	SV Darmstadt	81	(7)
1991–1994	SG Wattenscheid	60	(6)
1994–1996	Hannover 96	62	(4)
1996–2000	SC Austria Lustenau	70+	(6+)
1999	→ SpVgg Greuther Fürth (loan)	4	(0)
2000–2003	FC Lustenau		

Managerial career
- 2003–2007: FC Balzers
- 2010–2012: FC Vaduz (assistant)
- 2013–2016: 1. FC Nürnberg
- 2013: 1. FC Nürnberg (caretaker)
- 2014: 1. FC Nürnberg (caretaker)
- 2017–2018: SV Seligenporten
- * Club domestic league appearances and goals

Roger Prinzen (4 March 1969 – 13 April 2026) was a German football player and manager.

== Coaching career ==
Prinzen was head coach of Balzers and was assistant coach at Vaduz in Liechtenstein.

He was normally the U–23 coach for 1. FC Nürnberg. He took over the U–23 team on 21 June 2013. However, during the 2013–14 season, he took over on an interim basis on 7 October 2013 when Michael Wiesinger was sacked and on 23 April 2014 when Gertjan Verbeek was sacked. Rainer Zietsch took over the U–23 team on 19 October 2013 while Prinzen was coaching the first team. Valérien Ismaël succeeded Prinzen on 5 June 2014.

== Death ==
Prinzen died on 13 April 2026, at the age of 57.

== Coaching record ==
As of 26 February 2015

Team	From	To	Record					
Team	From	To	G	W	D	L	Win %	Ref.
Balzers	1 July 2003	30 June 2007						
1. FC Nürnberg II	21 June 2013	18 October 2013	17	5	7	5	29.41	
1. FC Nürnberg	7 October 2013	22 October 2013	1	0	1	0	0.00	
1. FC Nürnberg II	22 October 2013	23 April 2014	13	7	4	2	53.85	
1. FC Nürnberg	23 April 2014	5 June 2014	3	0	0	3	0.00	
1. FC Nürnberg II	5 June 2014	Present	22	5	8	9	22.73	
Total			56	17	20	19	30.36	—
