= Udo Klug =

German footballer

Personal information
- Date of birth: 28 July 1928
- Date of death: 3 October 2000 (aged 72)
- Position: Midfielder

Senior career*
Years	Team	Apps	(Gls)
1942–1943	FSV Frankfurt		
1945–1947	FSV Frankfurt		
1947–1948	1. FC Rödelheim 02		

Managerial career
- 1966–1971: Eintracht Frankfurt II
- 1971–1976: SV Darmstadt 98
- 1976–1978: Kickers Offenbach
- 1978–1979: Eintracht Frankfurt (caretaker)
- 1981–1983: 1. FC Nürnberg
- 1984–1986: SV Darmstadt 98
- 1986–1987: FC 08 Homburg
- 1988–1990: FC Wettingen
- 1991–1993: SV Eintracht Trier 05
- 1994–1995: SV Eintracht Trier 05
- * Club domestic league appearances and goals

Udo Klug (21 July 1928 – 3 October 2000) was a German football midfielder and later manager.

== Career ==
=== As a player ===
Udo Klug was initially active as a midfielder for FSV Frankfurt, among others. Between 1945 and 1947 he played at least 18 times for FSV in the Oberliga Süd. After his transfer to local rivals Rödelheimer FC in 1947, he played for them only once in the Oberliga. Later he was still active with SpVgg Bad Homburg, now as a goalkeeper. With this club he reached the final of the German Amateur Football Championship in 1955, which the Bad Homburg team lost 5-0 to Sportfreunde Siegen. He was a goalkeeper for the club.

=== As a coach ===
As a coach, he worked for SV Darmstadt 98, Kickers Offenbach (also manager), 1. FC Nürnberg and FC 08 Homburg in the 1. and 2. Bundesliga and in Switzerland for the first division team FC Wettingen, as a manager for Eintracht Frankfurt, FC 08 Homburg and Dynamo Dresden.

On 1 May 1966, Klug became coach of Eintracht Frankfurt's amateurs, which he managed until 1971. He also coached Eintracht Frankfurt's U23s from 1969 to 1971 before taking his first job as head coach at SV Darmstadt 98 in the Regionalliga Süd in the 1971/72 season. He built a successful team there with players from Eintracht Frankfurt's second tier, which became Regionalliga Süd champions in 1973. In the 1976/77 season, he was given leave of absence on 9 November 1976. Just a few days later, he replaced Zlatko Čajkovski as coach at Kickers Offenbach. He remained there until the end of the 1977/78 season. In 1978-1981, he was employed as manager of Eintracht Frankfurt and stepped in as interim coach from 10 December 1978, to 7 January 1979, during the 1978/79 season. After his contract as manager at Eintracht Frankfurt expired, he accepted an offer from 1. FC Nürnberg in September 1981. There he became the fifth head coach to be hired by club president Michael A. Roth in 1981. Udo Klug lasted on the bench from 9 September 1981 until 25 October 1983, before he too was fired. Klug led the "Club" to the 1982 DFB Cup final against FC Bayern Munich, which was lost 4-2 after an initial 2-0 lead, however. In the 1985/1986 season, he once again coached SV Darmstadt 98 in the 2. Bundesliga. As manager of FC 08 Homburg, he stepped in during the 1986/1987 season in the Bundesliga as interim coach from 23 August 1986 to 11 May 1987. He then accepted an engagement in Switzerland with first-division club FC Wettingen, which he coached from March 1988 to 1 October 1990, leading it from League B to League A and the second round of the UEFA Cup, where it narrowly failed to beat SSC Napoli before being dismissed - with his team in last place. His involvement with Dynamo Dresden in the 1993/94 season was curious, as he asked for his managerial contract to be terminated after just six months. His last coaching stop was Eintracht Trier (Regionalliga West/Südwest) in 1994/95. He last worked for MSV Duisburg as a player observer until 1998 and died after a long serious illness on 3 October 2000.

== Stages as a trainer ==
Year	League	Team	Note
1971/1972	Regionalliga Süd	SV Darmstadt 98	
1972/1973	Regionalliga Süd	SV Darmstadt 98	
1973/1974	Regionalliga Süd	SV Darmstadt 98	
1974/1975	2. Bundesliga Süd	SV Darmstadt 98	
1975/1976	2. Bundesliga Süd	SV Darmstadt 98	
1976/1977	2. Bundesliga Süd	SV Darmstadt 98	until 9 November 1976
1976/1977	2. Bundesliga Süd	Kickers Offenbach	(Coach / Manager Personalunion)
1977/1978	2. Bundesliga Süd	Kickers Offenbach	(Coach / Manager Personalunion)
1978/1979	Bundesliga	Eintracht Frankfurt	10 December 1978 until 7 January 1979 (interim)
1981/1982	Bundesliga	1. FC Nürnberg	from 9 September 1981
1982/1983	Bundesliga	1. FC Nürnberg	
1983/1984	Bundesliga	1. FC Nürnberg	from 25 October 1983
1984/1986	2. Bundesliga	SV Darmstadt 98	from 29 September 1984 until 25 September 1986
1986/1987	Bundesliga	FC 08 Homburg	from 23 August 1986 until 11 May 1987
1988/1989	1st League Switzerland	FC Wettingen	
1989/1990	1st League Switzerland	FC Wettingen	
1990/1991	1st League Switzerland	FC Wettingen	until 1 October 1990
1991/1992	Oberliga Südwest	Eintracht Trier	from October 1991
1992/1993	Oberliga Südwest	Eintracht Trier	
1993/1994	Regionalliga West/Südwest	Eintracht Trier	from February 1994
1994/1995	Regionalliga West/Südwest	Eintracht Trier	

== Achievements as coach ==
- Champion of the Regionallige Süd 1973 with SV Darmstadt 98
- Participation with 1. FC Nürnberg in the 1982 DFB Cup final (lost 4-2 to FC Bayern München at Frankfurt's Waldstadion on 1 May 1982)

== Stages as manager ==
- 1976–1978 Kickers Offenbach (Coach / Manager Personalunion)
- 1978–1981 Eintracht Frankfurt
- 1986–1987 FC 08 Homburg
- 1993–1994 Dynamo Dresden (Resignation in February 1994)
