= Horst Leupold =

German footballer (born 1942)

Personal information
- Date of birth: 30 January 1942 (age 84)
- Place of birth: Nuremberg, Germany
- Height: 1.74 m (5 ft 9 in)
- Position: Defender

Youth career
- 1952–1961: 1. FC Nürnberg

Senior career*
Years	Team	Apps	(Gls)
1962–1972	1. FC Nürnberg	223	(3)
1972	ASV Herzogenaurach		

Managerial career
- 1. SC Feucht
- 1979: TSV Röthenbach
- * Club domestic league appearances and goals

Horst "Leo" Leupold (born 30 January 1942) is a retired German football player. He spent six seasons in the Bundesliga with 1. FC Nürnberg.

== Honours ==
1. FC Nürnberg

- Bundesliga: 1967–68
