= Heinz Elzner =

German footballer (1928–2019)

Personal information
- Date of birth: 4 December 1928
- Place of birth: Brehna, Germany
- Date of death: 3 August 2019 (aged 90)
- Position: Defender

Senior career*
| Years | Team | Apps | (Gls) |
| 1950–1953 | TSG Ulm 1846 | | |
| 1953–1959 | Hannover 96 | | |
| 1959–1961 | Wuppertaler SV | | |

Managerial career
- 1961–1963: Eintracht Bad Kreuznach
- 1963–1966: VfB Helmbrechts
- 1966–1968: FC Bayern Hof
- 1968–1970: VfR Mannheim
- 1970–1972: Jahn Regensburg
- 1972–1974: SpVgg Fürth
- 1974–1977: FC Bayern Hof
- 1977–1980: SpVgg Bayreuth
- 1980–1981: FC Augsburg
- 1981: 1. FC Nürnberg
- * Club domestic league appearances and goals

Heinz Elzner (4 December 1928 – 3 August 2019) was a German football defender and later manager. Elzner died on 3 August 2019, at the age of 90.
