= Herbert Widmayer =

German football player and manager (1913–1998)

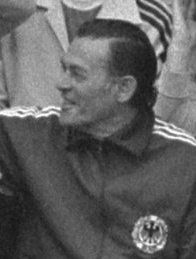
- Widmayer in 1974

Personal information
- Date of birth: 17 November 1913
- Place of birth: Kiel, German Empire
- Date of death: 31 July 1998 (aged 84)
- Place of death: Frechen, Germany
- Position: Forward

Senior career*
Years	Team	Apps	(Gls)
- Holstein Kiel
- 1860 Munich
- Eintracht Braunschweig

Managerial career
- 1948–1950: VfL Osnabrück
- 1955–1956: SV Sodingen
- 1956–1960: VfL Bochum
- 1960–1963: 1. FC Nürnberg
- 1964–1966: KSV Hessen Kassel
- 1968: Karlsruher SC
- * Club domestic league appearances and goals

Herbert Widmayer (17 November 1913 – 31 July 1998) was a German football player and manager. He is the first ever coach to be prematurely terminated in Bundesliga history. He was the younger brother of Werner Widmayer

Widmayer played Holstein Kiel, 1860 Munich and Eintracht Braunschweig. After World War II he commenced a coaching career.

In 1960, he joined 1. FC Nürnberg, the most titled German club then, succeeding the Austrian player legend Franz Binder. He led Nürnberg, in Germany nicknamed "the Club", to the South German Championship in the same year. In the final of the tournament for the national title Nürnberg defeated Borussia Dortmund in front of 82,000 spectators in Hanover's Niedersachsenstadion with 3–0. In the following year the Club once more won the South German Championship, and once more reached the national final, this time in Berlin's Olympic Stadium, and losing there 4–0 vs 1. FC Köln.

== Honours ==
- German Championship 1961
- German Cup 1962
