= Horst Heese =

German footballer and manager

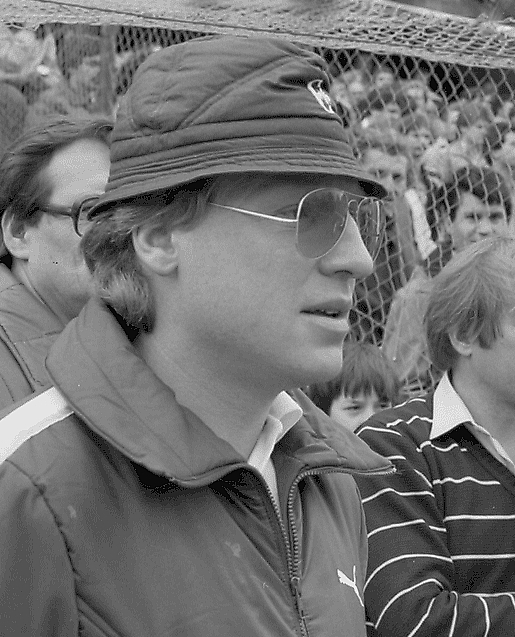

Personal information
- Date of birth: 31 December 1943 (age 82)
- Place of birth: Düsseldorf, Germany
- Position: Striker

Youth career
- –1962: BV 04 Düsseldorf
- 1962–1964: VfB Hilden

Senior career*
Years	Team	Apps	(Gls)
1964–1967	Hamborn 07		
1967–1969	Wuppertaler SV		
1969–1972	Eintracht Frankfurt	108	(27)
1972–1974	Hamburger SV	41	(11)
1974–1975	AS Eupen	23	(6)
1975–1976	AS Eupen	?	(?)

Managerial career
- 1979–1980: Kickers Offenbach
- 1980–1981: 1. FC Nürnberg
- 1981–1982: Freiburger FC
- 1982–1983: FSV Frankfurt
- 1983–1985: Fortuna Köln
- 1986: Viktoria Aschaffenburg
- 1988–1991: Malta
- 1992: Kelantan
- 1993: Eintracht Frankfurt
- 1996: VfB Gießen
- 2003–2005: Malta
- * Club domestic league appearances and goals

Horst Heese (born 31 December 1943) is a German former professional football player and manager. Heese had 149 Bundesliga appearances for Eintracht Frankfurt and HSV. After his retirement he managed Offenbach, Nürnberg and Frankfurt. After being sacked in 1993 in Frankfurt he moved back to Eupen in Belgium, where he still lives.

In 1988, he became the national coach of Malta until May 1991. After that, he coached in Cyprus and Singapore before returning to Malta for another four years as technical director and then as head coach.
