= Gunther Baumann =

German footballer (1921–1998)

Personal information
- Date of birth: 19 January 1921
- Date of death: 7 February 1998 (aged 77)
- Position: Midfielder

Senior career*
| Years | Team | Apps | (Gls) |
| 1937–1939 | VfB Leipzig | | |
| 1939–1940 | Hannover 96 | | |
| 1947–1949 | Stuttgarter Kickers | | |
| 1949–1956 | 1. FC Nürnberg | | |

International career
| 1950–1951 | West Germany | 2 | (0) |

Managerial career
- 1964–1965: 1. FC Nürnberg
- 1965–1966: 1. FC Schweinfurt 05
- 1967: 1860 Munich
- 1967–1969: VfB Stuttgart
- 1974: VfR Mannheim
- 1976: 1. FC Schweinfurt 05
- * Club domestic league appearances and goals

Gunther Baumann (19 January 1921 – 7 February 1998) was a German footballer and manager.
