= Marc Oechler =

German footballer

Personal information
- Date of birth: 11 February 1968 (age 58)
- Place of birth: Nuremberg, West Germany
- Height: 1.80 m (5 ft 11 in)
- Position: Attacking midfielder

Youth career
- 1. FC Nürnberg

Senior career*
Years	Team	Apps	(Gls)
1986–1999	1. FC Nürnberg	273	(25)
1999–2000	Kavala	16	(2)
2000–2001	SC 04 Schwabach		
- * Club domestic league appearances and goals

Marc Oechler (born 11 February 1968) is a German former professional footballer who played as an attacking midfielder. He was, as of October 2012, a board member at 1. FC Nürnberg.

Oechler played for Kavala in the 1999–2000 Alpha Ethniki season.
