= Günter Sebert =

German football player and manager (born 1948)

Personal information
- Date of birth: 29 May 1948 (age 78)
- Place of birth: Mannheim, West Germany
- Positions: Defender; midfielder; sweeper

Team information
- Current team: Waldhof Mannheim (Sport Director)

Youth career
- 1956–1966: Waldhof Mannheim

Senior career*
Years	Team	Apps	(Gls)
1966–1987	Waldhof Mannheim	592	(110)

Managerial career
- 1988–1991: Waldhof Mannheim
- 1992–1993: Hertha BSC
- 1994: Stuttgarter Kickers
- 1995: 1. FC Nürnberg
- 1996–1997: Waldhof Mannheim
- 1998–2001: VfR Mannheim
- 2001–2003: Jahn Regensburg
- 2003: TuS Celle FC
- 2003–2005: SV Sandhausen
- * Club domestic league appearances and goals

Günter Sebert (born 29 May 1948) is a German former football player and manager. He is the former sport director of SV Waldhof Mannheim.

== Playing career ==
Sebert began his career in 1957 as a nine-year-old in the youth team of SV Waldhof Mannheim before he was called up to the first team in 1967. During his active time, Sebert was only active for SV Waldhof. He played around 700 competitive games for the blue and blacks, 128 of them in the Bundesliga, in which he scored 13 goals. He is honorary captain and with 592 completed league games record player at SV Waldhof Mannheim. In 1983, Sebert led the Waldhöfer as captain to promotion to the Bundesliga. The best placement there was sixth in the 1984/85 season. Sebert ended his playing career in 1987 at the age of 39.

== Coaching career ==
Born in Mannheim, Sebert began his coaching career at Waldhof Mannheim in July 1986 as an assistant coach. He was then promoted to head coach on 17 November 1988 and was in that position until 30 June 1990. He then took over at Hertha BSC on 21 August 1992 and was head coach until 20 October 1993. He was head coach of Stuttgarter Kickers from 2 March 1994 to 30 June 1994. 1. FC Nürnberg was his next destination when he took over on 1 January 1995 and was there until 30 June 1995. He returned to Waldhof Mannheim on 10 October 1996 and was there until 28 March 1997.

== Profession ==
Sebert is a trained lathe operator and worked at Bopp & Reuther in Mannheim, later he was employed by the city of Mannheim before devoting himself entirely to football. From January 2009 to April 2013 he was sporting director at SV Waldhof.

In 1986 Sebert published his biography Waldhof ist mein Leben.

== Literature ==
- Fritz Glanzner, Kurt Schaller: Günter Sebert: Waldhof ist mein Leben. TIP-publisher, Lampertheim 1986
