= Werner Kern (football manager) =

German football coach (born 1946)

Personal information
- Full name: Werner Kern
- Date of birth: 23 February 1946 (age 80)
- Place of birth: Germany

Team information
- Current team: Bayern Munich (Director of Youth)

Managerial career
- Years: Team
- 1970–1977: Bayern Munich II
- 1977–1978: Wormatia Worms
- 1978–1979: 1. FC Nürnberg
- 1979–1981: Eintracht Trier
- 1981–1983: SSV Ulm 1846

Werner Kern (born 23 February 1946 in Berchtesgaden) is a German football coach, who is head of the youth department at FC Bayern Munich.

After a career playing amateur football, Kern was appointed assistant manager of Bayern Munich in 1970, where he remained until 1977, serving during the club's golden era. He assisted Udo Lattek and Dettmar Cramer, and also managed the reserve team.

He then went into management himself, working at Wormatia Worms, 1. FC Nürnberg, Eintracht Trier and SSV Ulm 1846. In 1998, he was to return to Bayern Munich to head up the revamped youth setup but later retired.
