= Willi Entenmann =

German footballer (1943–2012)

Personal information
- Date of birth: 25 September 1943
- Place of birth: Benningen am Neckar, Germany
- Date of death: 3 January 2012 (aged 68)
- Place of death: Garmisch-Partenkirchen, Germany
- Height: 1.75 m (5 ft 9 in)
- Position: Defender

Senior career*
Years	Team	Apps	(Gls)
–1963	TSV Benningen		
1963–1976	VfB Stuttgart	245	(28)
1976–1978	TSG Backnang		

Managerial career
- 1986: VfB Stuttgart
- 1990: VfB Stuttgart
- 1991–1993: 1. FC Nürnberg
- 1994–1996: VfB Stuttgart II
- 1996–1997: 1. FC Nürnberg
- 1997–1998: SpVgg Unterhaching
- 2000–2001: VfR Aalen
- 2002: SV Sandhausen
- 2003–2004: SGV Freiberg
- * Club domestic league appearances and goals

Willi Entenmann (25 September 1943 – 3 January 2012) was a German football coach and player.

Entenmann was born in Benningen am Neckar. As a coach in the Bundesliga, his highest finish was fifth place in 1986. He died, aged 68, in Garmisch-Partenkirchen.

== Honours ==
As a coach

- DFB-Pokal finalist: 1985–86
