= Robert Gebhardt =

German football player and manager (1920–1986)

Personal information
- Date of birth: 22 September 1920
- Place of birth: Nuremberg, Germany
- Date of death: 8 February 1986 (aged 65)
- Position: Midfielder

Senior career*
Years	Team	Apps	(Gls)
1936–1943	1. FC Nürnberg		
1943–1945	LSV Hamburg		
1945–1950	1. FC Nürnberg	125	(22)
1950–1953	FC St. Pauli		
1953–1954	TuS Bremerhaven 93		

Managerial career
- 1954–1958: TuS Bremerhaven 93
- 1958–1960: SV Sodingen
- 1960–1961: BC Augsburg
- 1961–1965: Wuppertaler SV
- 1966–1968: SpVgg Fürth
- 1968–1970: MSV Duisburg
- 1970–1971: Werder Bremen
- 1973–1974: Wacker Innsbruck
- 1975–1976: Hessen Kassel
- 1978–1980: 1. FC Nürnberg
- * Club domestic league appearances and goals

Robert Gebhardt (20 September 1920 – 8 February 1986) was a German footballer and manager. As a player, he won the 1948 German championship with 1. FC Nürnberg. He also managed several clubs in the Bundesliga, spending two years in charge of MSV Duisburg, followed by a further two years at Werder Bremen before returning to Nürnberg in 1978.
