= Fritz Popp =

German footballer (born 1940)

Personal information
- Date of birth: 20 November 1940 (age 85)
- Place of birth: Nuremberg, Germany
- Height: 1.78 m (5 ft 10 in)
- Position: Defender

Youth career
- TV 1860 Schweinau

Senior career*
Years	Team	Apps	(Gls)
1962–1972	1. FC Nürnberg	235	(3)
- ASV Herzogenaurach

Managerial career
- 1981: 1. FC Nürnberg
- 1983: 1. FC Nürnberg (interim)
- * Club domestic league appearances and goals

Fritz Popp (born 20 November 1940) is a retired German football player. He spent six seasons in the Bundesliga with 1. FC Nürnberg. As of February 2009, he is a player agent.

== Honours ==
- Bundesliga: 1967–68
