= Thomas Brunner (footballer) =

German footballer (born 1962)

Personal information
- Date of birth: 10 August 1962 (age 64)
- Place of birth: Blaibach, West Germany
- Height: 1.80 m (5 ft 11 in)
- Positions: Defender; midfielder

Team information
- Current team: 1. FC Schnaittach (manager)

Youth career
- TSV Blaibach
- –1978: ASV Cham
- 1978–1982: 1. FC Nürnberg

Senior career*
Years	Team	Apps	(Gls)
1982–1996	1. FC Nürnberg	402	(25)

International career
1981–1983	Germany U-21	9	(0)

Managerial career
- 1996–1998: 1. FC Nürnberg
- 1998: 1. FC Nürnberg (caretaker)
- 2000: 1. FC Nürnberg (caretaker)
- 2004–2005: SpVgg Weiden
- 2006–: 1. FC Schnaittach
- * Club domestic league appearances and goals

Thomas Brunner (born 10 August 1962 in Blaibach) is a German football coach and a former player who manages German lower-league side 1. FC Schnaittach.

== Career record ==
As of 26 April 2014

Team	From	To	Record					
Team	From	To	G	W	D	L	Win %	Ref.
1. FC Nürnberg	2 December 1998	20 December 1998	3	0	1	2	0.00	
1. FC Nürnberg	19 February 2000	2 March 2000	1	0	1	0	0.00	
SpVgg Weiden								
1. FC Schnaittach								
Total			4	0	2	2	0.00	—

== Honours ==
- DFB-Pokal finalist: 1981–82
