= Dieter Lieberwirth =

German footballer and coach

Personal information
- Date of birth: 13 January 1954 (age 72)
- Place of birth: Fürth, West Germany
- Position: Midfielder

Youth career
- ESV Rangierbahnhof Nürnberg
- –1975: TSV Roth

Senior career*
Years	Team	Apps	(Gls)
1975–1989	1. FC Nürnberg	270	(39)

Managerial career
- 1987–1991: 1. FC Nürnberg (assistant)
- 1990: 1. FC Nuremberg (caretaker)
- 1991–2002: SG Quelle Fürth
- 2003–2005: 1. FC Nürnberg (assistant)
- 2005: 1. FC Nürnberg (caretaker)
- 2005–2007: 1. FC Nürnberg (assistant)
- 2007–2008: 1. FC Nürnberg (youth team assistant)
- 2008–2010: 1. FC Nürnberg (youth team)
- 2012–2013: SC Eltersdorf
- * Club domestic league appearances and goals

Dieter "Jogi" Lieberwirth (born 13 January 1954) is a German football coach and a former player. In the 2005–06 season, he was caretaker manager of 1. FC Nürnberg for one game.

== Honours ==
- DFB-Pokal finalist: 1981–82
