= Michael Wiesinger =

German footballer and manager (born 1972)

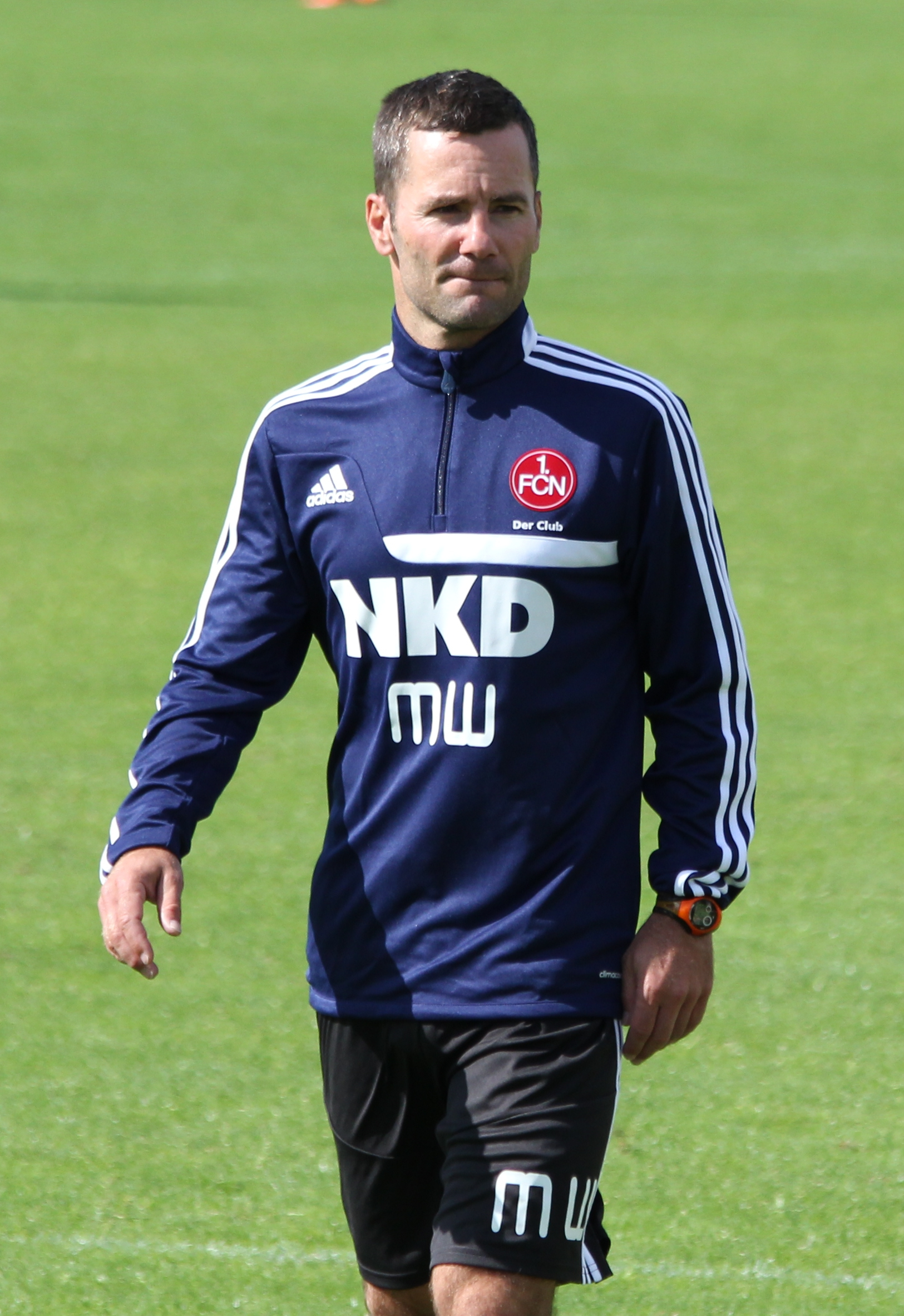
- Wiesinger as coach of 1. FC Nürnberg in 2013

Personal information
- Date of birth: 27 December 1972 (age 53)
- Place of birth: Burghausen, West Germany
- Height: 1.70 m (5 ft 7 in)
- Position: Midfielder

Team information
- Current team: FC Bayern Campus (sporting director)

Youth career
- 1976–1981: DJK Emmerting
- 1981–1990: SV Gendorf
- 1990–1991: 1860 München
- 1991–1993: FC Starnberg

Senior career*
Years	Team	Apps	(Gls)
1993–1999	1. FC Nürnberg	186	(25)
1999–2001	Bayern Munich	19	(1)
2001–2004	1860 München	44	(2)
2004–2007	Wacker Burghausen	76	(1)
2007–2008	SpVgg Weiden	24	(2)
Total		349	(31)

Managerial career
- 2008–2009: FC Ingolstadt II
- 2009: FC Ingolstadt (interim)
- 2009–2010: FC Ingolstadt
- 2011–2012: 1. FC Nürnberg II
- 2012–2013: 1. FC Nürnberg
- 2015–2017: SV Elversberg
- 2017–2018: KFC Uerdingen
- 2020: 1. FC Nürnberg (interim)
- * Club domestic league appearances and goals

Michael Wiesinger (born 27 December 1972) is a German football manager and former professional player who is currently the sporting director and head of youth development at the FC Bayern Campus.

== Playing career ==
A midfielder, Wiesinger began his professional career with 1. FC Nürnberg, before joining Bayern Munich on a free transfer in 1999. He spent two years at Bayern, winning two German titles and the Champions League, but made few first team appearances before moving to Bayern's rivals TSV 1860 München, where he had previously been a youth team player. He spent two and a half years at 1860, moving on to Wacker Burghausen, his hometown club, in January 2004. He left the club in June 2007 and joined SpVgg Weiden, where he spent one year before retiring.

== Managerial career ==
=== FC Ingolstadt ===
He took up his role as coach of FC Ingolstadt's reserve team. Since 9 November 2009, he was caretaker manager of the first team before being later confirmed as manager. Almost exactly a year later, Wiesinger was sacked with Ingolstadt in 17th place in the 2. Bundesliga.

=== 1. FC Nürnberg ===
In April 2011, he returned to 1. FC Nürnberg, to take charge of the club's reserve team. He was promoted to manager of the first team in December 2012, after Dieter Hecking left to take over at VfL Wolfsburg. Wiesinger was sacked by the club on 7 October 2013, the day after a 5–0 home defeat by Hamburger SV in the 2013-14 Bundesliga. On the day of Wiesinger's sacking, the club had scored a total of only five points and remained without a win after the first eight matches of the 2013–2014 Bundesliga, and was in the third last position in the league table. "The recent games showed that no consistent upward trend is developing. It was a very difficult decision, but in the interest of 1. FC Nürnberg we feel forced to act", Nürnberg's sporting director Martin Bader said.

=== KFC Uerdingen 05 ===
In July 2017 Wiseinger became the new manager of KFC Uerdingen 05. He left the club by mutual consent on 15 March 2018 despite the club being at first place in Regionalliga West.

=== Second stint at 1. FC Nürnberg ===
He returned to Nürnberg on 29 June 2020 for the relegation-playoffs.

=== Bayern Munich ===
On 21 April 2026, Wiesinger was appointed as head of sport and youth development at the FC Bayern Campus.

== Managerial statistics ==
As of 11 July 2020

Team	From	To	Record							
Team	From	To	G	W	D	L	GF	GA	GD	Win %
FC Ingolstadt II	1 July 2008	22 April 2009	27	10	8	9	32	32	+0	37.04
FC Ingolstadt	9 November 2009	6 November 2010	35	16	8	11	59	50	+9	45.71
1. FC Nürnberg II	1 July 2011	23 December 2012	56	22	15	19	93	80	+13	39.29
1. FC Nürnberg	24 December 2012	7 October 2013	26	6	12	8	32	43	−11	23.08
SV Elversberg	1 July 2015	30 June 2017	75	45	17	13	135	60	+75	60.00
KFC Uerdingen	1 July 2017	15 March 2018	26	14	9	3	44	19	+25	53.85
1. FC Nürnberg	29 June 2020	11 July 2020	2	1	0	1	3	3	+0	50.00
Total			247	113	70	64	395	285	+110	45.75

== Honours ==
=== Player ===
Bayern Munich

- Bundesliga: 2000–01
- DFB-Pokal: 1999–2000
- DFB-Ligapokal: 1999, 2000
- UEFA Champions League: 2000–01
