= 1. FC Nürnberg =

German association football club

- Full name: 1. Fußball-Club Nürnberg Verein für Leibesübungen e. V.
- Nicknames: Der Club (The Club); Die Legende (The Legend); Der Ruhmreiche (The Glorious); Der Altmeister (The Old Master)
- Short name: 1. FCN, FCN
- Founded: 4 May 1900; 126 years ago
- Ground: Max-Morlock-Stadion
- Capacity: 50,000
- Board of directors: Joti Chatzialexiou (Sports); Stefan Heim (Chief Financial Officer); Niels Rossow (Strategy & Marketing)
- Head coach: Miroslav Klose
- League: 2. Bundesliga
- 2025–26: 2. Bundesliga, 8th of 18
- Website: fcn.de
Home colours	Away colours	Third colours

1. Fußball-Club Nürnberg Verein für Leibesübungen e. V., often called 1. FC Nürnberg (German pronunciation: [ɛfˌtseː ˈnʏʁnbɛʁk], English: 1st Football Club Nuremberg), is a German sports club based in Nuremberg, Bavaria. It is best known for its men's football team, who currently compete in the 2. Bundesliga. Founded in 1900, the club initially competed in the Southern German championship, winning their first title in 1916. Their first German championship was won in 1920. Before the inauguration of the Bundesliga in 1963, 1. FCN won a further 11 regional championships, including the Oberliga Süd formed in 1945, and were German champions another seven times. The club has won the Bundesliga once and the DFB-Pokal four times.

Since 1963, the club has played their home games at the Max-Morlock-Stadion in Nuremberg. Today's club has sections for boxing, handball, hockey (inline skater hockey and ice hockey), rollerblading and ice skating, swimming, skiing, and tennis.

Nürnberg hold the joint record for promotions from the various second divisions to the Bundesliga at 8 with Arminia Bielefeld. Owing to its status as a founding member of the Bundesliga while Bielefeld was not, however, Nürnberg's consequent nine relegations from the top tier are a record by itself.

== History ==
=== Rise of "Der Club" ===
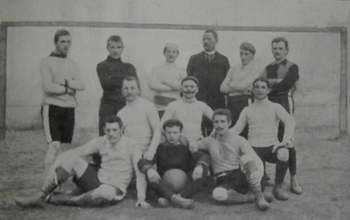
Team from 1902

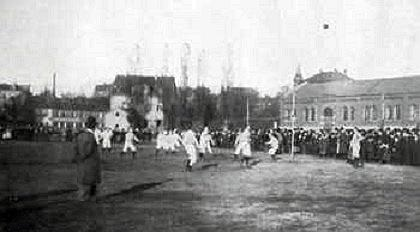
First match against FC Bayern Munich 1901

1. FC Nürnberg was founded on 4 May 1900 by a group of 18 young men who had gathered at local pub Burenhütte to assemble a side committed to playing football rather than rugby, one of the other new "English" games becoming popular at the time. By 1909, the team was playing well enough to win the South German championship. After World War I, Nürnberg would gradually turn their success into the dominance of the country's football. In the period from July 1918 to February 1922, the team would go unbeaten in 104 official matches. As early as 1919, they came to be referred to simply as "Der Club" in recognition of their skill and of their style on and off the field and would go on to become one of the nation's most widely recognized and popular teams.

Nürnberg faced SpVgg Fürth in the first national championship held after the end of World War I, beating the defending champions 2–0. That would be the first of five titles Der Club would win over the course of eight years. In each of those victories, they would shutout their opponents.

The 1922 final was contested by Nürnberg and Hamburger SV but never reached a conclusion on the pitch. The match was called on account of darkness after three hours and ten minutes of play, drawn at 2–2. The re-match also went into extra time, and in an era that did not allow for substitutions, that game was called at 1–1 when Nürnberg was reduced to just seven players and the referee ruled incorrectly the club could not continue. The German Football Association (DFB) awarded the win to Hamburger SV under the condition that they renounce the title in the name of "good sportsmanship", and ultimately the Viktoria trophy was not officially awarded that year.

=== After the glory years ===
1. FCN's dominance was already beginning to fade when they captured their final trophy of the era in 1927 as the game began to evolve into a more quickly paced contest which did not suit their slower, more deliberate approach. In 1934, they lost in the final to Schalke 04, a club that would go on to become the strongest side in the era of football in Nazi Germany. Nürnberg won national titles just before and after World War II in 1936 and 1948 – in the first post-war national final – and would also take the Tschammerpokal, the forerunner of today's DFB-Pokal, in 1935 and 1939.

=== Into the modern era ===
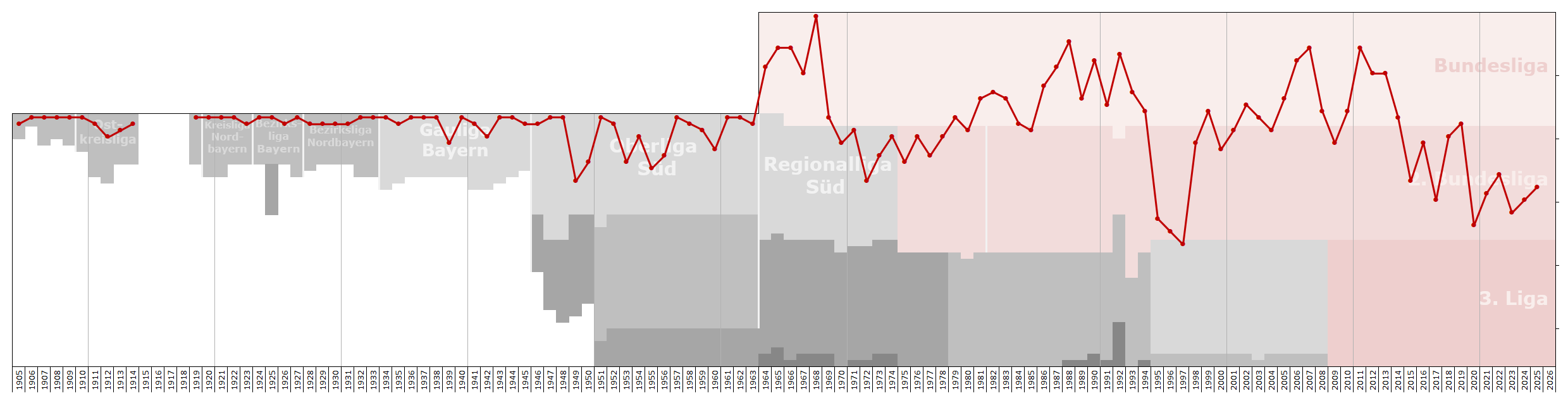
Historical chart of Nürnberg league performance

The post-war period began with the club being integrated into the Oberliga Süd, one of the five top divisions in West-Germany at the time. Nürnberg won this league six times until 1963, winning the national championship in 1948. In 1961, 1. FCN captured their eighth national title and appeared in a losing effort in the following year's final. Some consolation was to be had in the team capturing its second DFB-Pokal in 1962. The club's strong play made it an obvious choice to be amongst the 16 teams selected to participate in the Bundesliga, Germany's new professional football league formed in 1963. Der Club played as a mid-table side through the league's early years until putting on a dominating performance in 1968, in which it sat atop the league table from the fifth week of play on to the end of the season en route to its first Bundesliga title. It went on to become the first reigning champions to be relegated from the Bundesliga. This was a result of Max Merkel's decision to remove his championship-winning team of veterans – believing that they were too old – in favour of a dozen newcomers.

It would take the club nine years to recover and return from the second tier (first the Regionalliga Süd, then the 2. Bundesliga Süd), that included several failed efforts in the promotion rounds. 1. FCN returned to the Bundesliga for a year in 1978, but finish 17th and were relegated again. The club immediately played its way back to the top flight, but since then its Bundesliga performances have typically ended in the lower positions in the league table with occasional relegations. The side's best result in recent decades was a fifth-place finish in 1988.

The early 1980s saw the development of a supporter friendship between fans of Nürnberg and those of former rivals Schalke 04. Supporters have travelled to each other's away matches, and meetings between the two clubs are typically described as amicable.

In the mid-1990s, Nürnberg had financial problems, including the conviction of their club treasurer Ingo Böbel for fraud and misallocating club finances. This led to their being penalized six points in the 1995–96 season while playing in the 2. Bundesliga. The club was relegated to the third division as a consequence. Gradual improvements were made in the subsequent seasons.

In 1999, however, 1. FCN suffered what was arguably the worst end-of-season collapse in Bundesliga history. Going into the last game of the campaign, the club sat in 12th place, three points and five goals ahead of Eintracht Frankfurt in 16th place. Nürnberg's last home game against SC Freiburg, which was also facing relegation while Frankfurt was up against 1. FC Kaiserslautern, the previous season's champions who in a fight for a UEFA Champions League spot. FCN had already begun sending renewal letters to current season ticket holders which included statements about successfully avoiding relegation. Every other team in the equation won their matches, including Frankfurt who routed Kaiserslautern 5–1 with three late goals, whereas Nürnberg lost 2–1, with Frank Baumann missing a chance to score in the last minute, and suffered a shock relegation. 1. FCN was not relegated because they had fewer points than Frankfurt, nor because of a lower goal differential, but on the third tie-breaker – fewer goals scored.

=== 21st century ===
1. FCN rebounded and returned to the Bundesliga, but still found itself battling with relegation in most years. However, relegation was avoided comfortably in the 2005–06 season, finishing eighth in the Bundesliga. After several years of consolidation, Nürnberg seemed to be back as a strong force in German football. Manager Martin Bader's work (such as the signing of former Ajax captain and Czech international Tomáš Galásek), as well as head coach Hans Meyer's tactical awareness, helped Nürnberg to its most successful finish in almost 40 years. In May 2007, qualification for the UEFA Cup was assured, and after eliminating Eintracht Frankfurt in the semi-final, the Club won the DFB-Pokal final against VfB Stuttgart 3–2 after extra time, winning the trophy 45 years after its last victory.

In the first round of 2007–08 the team's form in the Bundesliga was poor, but due to finishing second in their UEFA Cup group (ahead of eventual champion Zenit Saint Petersburg), head coach Hans Meyer was allowed to restructure the team, for example by buying Czech international striker Jan Koller from Monaco. Little improvement was seen, and Meyer was replaced by Thomas von Heesen after two fixtures in the second half of the season. Von Heesen did not do much better, and 1. FCN was relegated in 16th place after losing 2–0 at home to Schalke 04 on the final matchday. After a slow start, Michael Oenning was able to guide Nürnberg to a third-place finish and a 5–0 aggregate win over Energie Cottbus in the play-off to rejoin the Bundesliga. The club was demoted again, however, after the 2013–14 season, finishing 17th with another final matchday loss to Schalke 04. The club finished third in the 2015–16 season and qualified for the promotion play-off, but lost on aggregate to Eintracht Frankfurt to remain in the 2. Bundesliga for 2016–17. The club went on to finish 2nd in 2017–2018 season, securing a promotion spot into the Bundesliga with an away win against SV Sandhausen. However, they finished bottom of the table the next season and were relegated once more.

In the 2019–20 2. Bundesliga season, they finished in 16th place and faced a relegation play-off against 3. Liga side and fellow Bavarians Ingolstadt. The tie ended 3–3 on aggregate with Nürnberg winning on away goals; the goal which retained their second-tier status was scored in the sixth minute of injury time in the second leg, thereby keeping them up at the last moment.

== Rivals ==
SpVgg Greuther Fürth is 1. FCN's longest standing local rival. The rivalry dates back to the early days of German football when, at times, those two clubs dominated the national championship. The clubs have played 258 matches against one another, the most in German professional football. In 1921, the Germany national team consisted only of players from Nürnberg and Fürth for a match against the Netherlands in Amsterdam. The players traveled in the same train, but with the Nürnberg players in a carriage at the front of the train and those from Fürth in a carriage at the rear, while team manager Georg B. Blaschke sat in the middle. A Fürth player scored the first goal of the match but was only congratulated by Fürth players. Allegedly, Hans Sutor, a former Fürth player, was forced to leave the team when he married a woman from Nuremberg. He was later signed by 1. FC Nürnberg and was in the team that eventually won three national championships. Both clubs played together in the Bundesliga in 2012–13.

Games against Bayern Munich are often considered major matches of the season, because the two clubs are among the most successful in Bavaria and Germany overall.

== Reserve team ==
The 1. FC Nürnberg II (or 1. FC Nürnberg Amateure) qualified for the Regionalliga Süd on the strength of a third place in the Bayernliga (IV) in 2007–08. The team had been playing in the Bayernlig since 1998, finishing runners-up three times in those years. When not playing in the Bayernlig, the team used to belong to the Landesliga Bayern-Mitte. Nowadays, it plays in tier four Regionalliga Bayern.

== League results ==
=== Recent seasons ===
The season-by-season performance of the club in the 21st century:

Key

↑ Promoted	↓ Relegated

Season	Division	Tier	Position
2000–01	2. Bundesliga	II	1st ↑
2001–02	Bundesliga	I	15th
2002–03	Bundesliga	I	17th ↓
2003–04	2. Bundesliga	II	1st ↑
2004–05	Bundesliga	I	14th
2005–06	Bundesliga	I	8th
2006–07	Bundesliga	I	6th
2007–08	Bundesliga	I	16th ↓
2008–09	2. Bundesliga	II	3rd ↑
2009–10	Bundesliga	I	16th
2010–11	Bundesliga	I	6th
2011–12	Bundesliga	I	10th
2012–13	Bundesliga	I	10th
2013–14	Bundesliga	I	17th ↓
2014–15	2. Bundesliga	II	9th
2015–16	2. Bundesliga	II	3rd
2016–17	2. Bundesliga	II	12th
2017–18	2. Bundesliga	II	2nd ↑
2018–19	Bundesliga	I	18th ↓
2019–20	2. Bundesliga	II	16th
2020–21	2. Bundesliga	II	11th
2021–22	2. Bundesliga	II	8th
2022–23	2. Bundesliga	II	14th
2023–24	2. Bundesliga	II	12th
2024–25	2. Bundesliga	II	10th
2025–26	2. Bundesliga	II	8th
2026–27	2. Bundesliga	II	

=== All time ===
the highest level of football in Germany; the second highest; the third highest.

== Honours ==
Der Club boasted the title of Deutscher Rekordmeister as holder of the most championships for over 60 years (although occasionally having to share the honour with Schalke 04) before being overtaken by Bayern Munich in 1987.

Germany honours its Bundesliga champions by allowing them to display the gold stars of the "Verdiente Meistervereine" – one star for three titles, two stars for five and three stars for ten. However, currently, only titles earned since 1963 in the Bundesliga are officially recognized. Despite winning the national title nine times, Nürnberg – the country's second-most successful side – is not entitled to sport any championship stars.

=== League ===
- German Football Championship/Bundesliga
  - Champions: 1920, 1921, 1924, 1925, 1927, 1936, 1948, 1961, 1967–68
  - Runners-up: 1934, 1937, 1961–62
- 2. Bundesliga/2. Bundesliga Süd
  - Champions: 1980, 1985, 2001, 2004

=== Cup ===
- DFB-Pokal
  - Winners: 1935, 1939, 1961–62, 2006–07
  - Runners-up: 1940, 1981–82

=== European competitions ===
- European Cup
  - Quarter-finals: 1961–62
- European Cup Winners' Cup
  - Semi-finals: 1962–63
- Intertoto Cup
  - Group Winners: 1968
- Coupe Jean Dupuich
  - Semi-finals: 1913

=== Regional ===
- Süddeutsche Meisterschaft
  - Champions: 1916, 1918, 1920, 1921, 1924, 1927, 1929
- Ostkreis-Liga
  - Champions: 1916, 1918
- Kreisliga Nordbayern
  - Champions: 1920, 1921
- Bezirksliga Bayern
  - Champions: 1924, 1925, 1927
- Bezirksliga Nordbayern
  - Champions: 1929, 1932, 1933
- Gauliga Bayern
  - Champions: 1934, 1936, 1937, 1938, 1940
- Oberliga Süd
  - Champions: 1947, 1948, 1951, 1957, 1961, 1962
- Regionalliga Süd (II)
  - Champions: 1971
- Southern German Cup
  - Winners: 1919, 1924

== Stadium ==
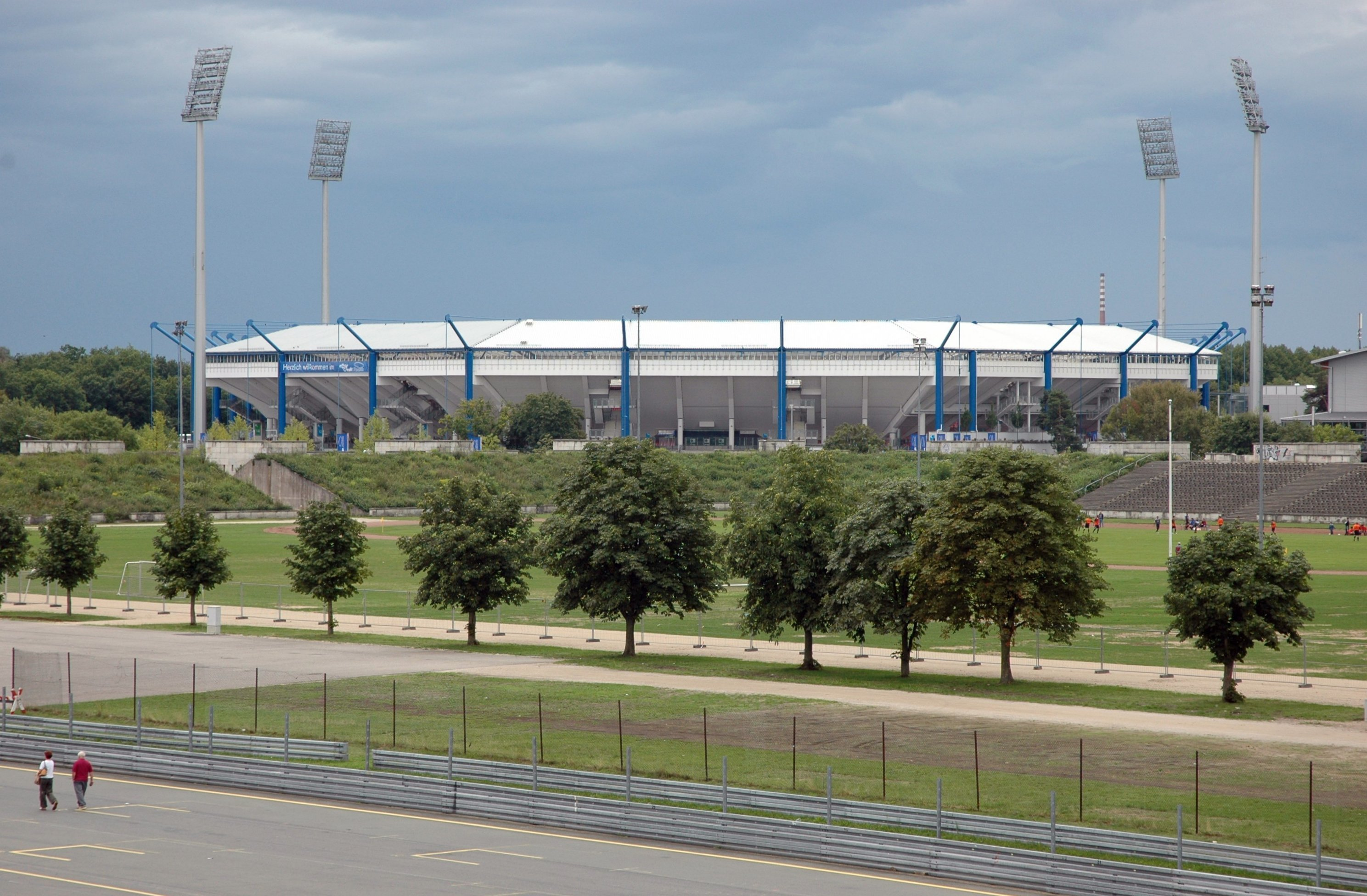
Max-Morlock-Stadion in August 2006

"Der Club" plays in the communally-owned Max-Morlock-Stadion. It has been the club's home since 1963, and currently has a capacity of 50,000 spectators following the stadium's most recent expansion during the winter break of the 2009–10 season. The club previously played its matches at the Zabo (an abbreviation of Zerzabelshof, the district in which the ground was located).

The stadium was built in 1928 and was known as Stadion der Hitler-Jugend from 1933 to 1945. then as the Frankenstadion (Franconia Stadium). Originally having a capacity of 40,000 spectators, it was expanded in 1965 to hold 65,000 and subsequently hosted the 1967 Cup Winners' Cup final between Bayern Munich and Rangers, won 1–0 by the German side. The facility was refurbished for the 1974 FIFA World Cup and another renovation allowed it to seat 45,000 for four preliminary round matches and one Round of 16 contest of the 2006 World Cup.

The Frankenstadion bore the commercial name "Grundig Stadion" from 2012 under an arrangement with a local company. The majority of the fans were in favour of renaming it after club legend Max Morlock. Morlock's name was finally used in 2017.

A feasibility study was commissioned by the club in the 2010s over the possibility of constructing a new stadium, with contact made with potential partners. It would be built on the same site and hold a capacity of 50,000 spectators. However, the club never announced any official plans for a new stadium and no major changes had been made by 2024, in which Nuremberg was overlooked as a host city for the UEFA Euro 2024 tournament held in Germany.

== Kits ==
Years	Kit manufacturer	Shirt sponsor
1985–87	Adidas	Patrizier
1987–93	Adidas	Reflecta
1993–94	Puma	Trigema
1994–96	Puma	ARO
1996–98	Adidas	ARO
1998–00	Adidas	VIAG Interkom
2000–02	Adidas	Adecco
2002–03	Adidas	Entrium Direct Bankers AG
2003–04	Adidas	DiBa Bank
2004–08	Adidas	mister*lady
2008–12	Adidas	Areva
2012–14	Adidas	NKD
2014–16	Adidas	Wolf Möbel
2016–21	Umbro	Nürnberger Versicherung
2021–25	Adidas	Nürnberger Versicherung
2025-	Adidas	Toolcraft

== Players ==
=== Current squad ===
As of 1 November 2026

Note: Flags indicate national team as defined under FIFA eligibility rules; some limited exceptions apply. Players may hold more than one non-FIFA nationality.

No.	Pos.	Nation	Player
1	GK	GER	Jan Reichert (captain)
4	DF	GRE	Alexis Kalogeropoulos
5	DF	ARM	Styopa Mkrtchyan
6	MF	FIN	Adam Markhiev
7	FW	FRA	Rayan Ghrieb
8	MF	ESP	Javi Fernández (on loan from Bayern Munich)
9	FW	NOR	Sigurd Haugen
10	MF	GER	Julian Justvan
11	FW	DEN	William Bøving (on loan from Mainz 05)
13	GK	POL	Robin Lisewski
14	DF	ITA	Andrea Ceresoli
15	DF	SEN	Mikayil Faye (on loan from Rennes)
16	MF	GER	Marko Soldić
18	MF	GER	Rafael Lubach
19	FW	GER	Piet Scobel

No.	Pos.	Nation	Player
20	DF	GER	Fynn Otto
21	DF	GRE	Giannis Masouras
22	MF	GER	Finn Ole Becker
23	FW	ITA	Mohamed Alì Zoma
26	GK	GER	Christian Mathenia
28	FW	SYR	Can Moustfa
32	DF	GER	Tim Janisch
35	MF	GER	Marc Kornwachs Barjuan
36	DF	CRO	Kristian Mandić
39	FW	GER	Adriano Grimaldi
41	DF	GER	Eric Porstner
43	DF	GER	Tobias Heß
44	DF	PLE	Khalid Abu El Haija
46	GK	GER	Nicolas Ortegel
—	MF	GER	Winners Osawe

=== Out on loan ===
Note: Flags indicate national team as defined under FIFA eligibility rules; some limited exceptions apply. Players may hold more than one non-FIFA nationality.

No.	Pos.	Nation	Player
—	GK	SVK	Michal Kukučka (at Jablonec until 30 June 2027)
—	MF	MAR	Ayoub Chaikhoun (at Wehen Wiesbaden until 30 June 2027)
—	MF	GER	Xaver Kiefersauer (at Würzburger Kickers until 30 June 2027)
—	MF	GER	Justin von der Hitz (at Alemannia Aachen until 30 June 2027)

No.	Pos.	Nation	Player
—	FW	MTQ	Mickaël Biron (at Batman Petrolspor until 30 June 2027)
—	FW	CRO	Tino Kusanović (at SV Ried until 30 June 2027)
—	FW	CGO	Noah Maboulou (at Viktoria Köln until 30 June 2027)
—	FW	GER	Semir Telalović (at Rot-Weiss Essen until 30 June 2027)

=== Notable former players ===
==== Greatest ever team ====
In the summer of 2010, as part of the club's celebration of its 110th anniversary, Nürnberg fans voted for the best players in the club's history. The players who received the most votes in each position were named in the club's greatest ever team.

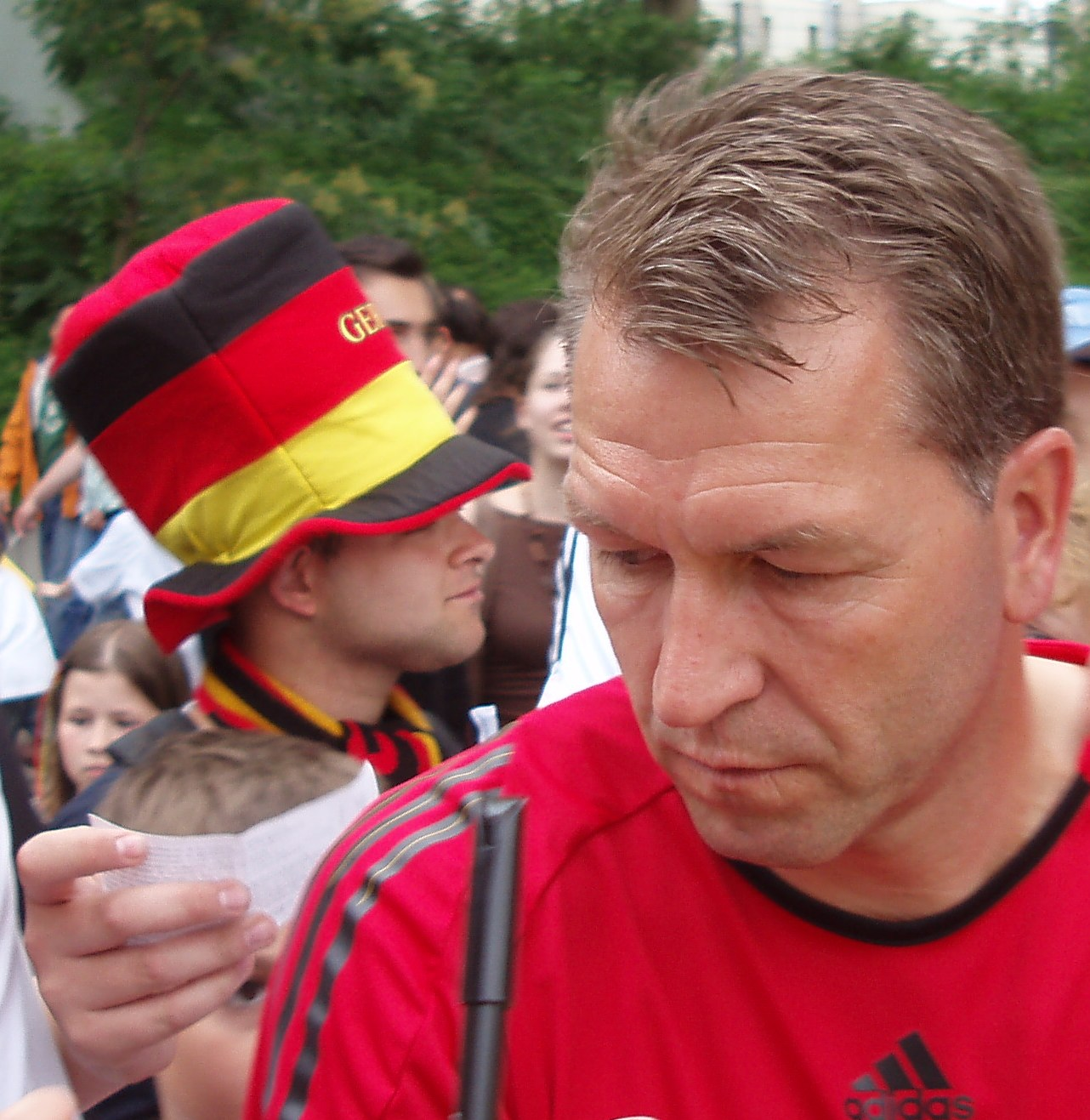
Supporters voted Andreas Köpke (pictured) as the club's greatest ever goalkeeper.

Greatest ever 1. FC Nürnberg team
- (Germany) Andreas Köpke
- (Germany) Ferdinand Wenauer
- (Germany) Thomas Brunner
- (Germany) Andreas Wolf
- (Germany) Stefan Reuter
- (Germany) Hans Dorfner
- (Austria) Reinhold Hintermaier
- (Slovakia) Marek Mintál
- (Germany) Max Morlock
- (North Macedonia) Saša Ćirić
- (Germany) Dieter Eckstein

Reserves: Hans Kalb, Stefan Kießling, Horst Leupold, Dieter Nüssing, Marc Oechler, Luitpold Popp, Raphael Schäfer, Heinz Strehl, Heinrich Stuhlfauth, Horst Weyerich, Sergio Zárate

==== Records ====
As of 24 May 2021

Most league appearances in the Bundesliga era (since 1963)
Rank	Name	Years	Bundesliga	2.Liga	Total
1	(Germany) Thomas Brunner	1980–1996	328	74	402
2	(Germany) Raphael Schäfer	2001–2007, 2008–2017	250	108	358
3	(Germany) Andreas Köpke	1986–1994, 1999–2001	280	58	338
4	(Germany) Norbert Eder	1975–1984	154	146	300
5	(Germany) Dieter Lieberwirth	1975–1988	139	131	270
6	(Argentina) Javier Pinola	2005–2015	202	58	260
7	(Germany) Peter Stocker	1975–1983	118	131	249
8	(Germany) Marc Oechler	1989–1999	163	77	240
9	(Germany) Horst Weyerich	1976–1985	132	98	230
10	(Czech Republic) Marek Nikl	1998–2007	141	87	228

Top league goalscorers in the Bundesliga era (since 1963)
Rank	Name	Years	Bundesliga	2.Liga	Total	Ratio
1	(Germany) Dieter Eckstein	1984–1988, 1991–1993	66 (189)	13 (37)	79 (226)	0.35
2	(Germany) Heinz Strehl	1963–1970	76 (174)	0 (0)	76 (174)	0.44
3	(Germany) Hans Walitza	1974–1979	0 (9)	71 (118)	71 (127)	0.56
4	(Slovakia) Marek Mintál	2003–2011	32 (121)	34 (59)	66 (180)	0.37
5	(Germany) Franz Brungs	1965–1968, 1971–1972	50 (97)	0 (0)	50 (97)	0.52
6	(Germany) Horst Weyerich	1976–1985	21 (132)	27 (98)	48 (230)	0.21
7	(Germany) Dieter Nüssing	1968–1977	5 (23)	39 (109)	44 (132)	0.33
8	(North Macedonia) Saša Ćirić	1998–1999, 2002–2004	25 (55)	18 (37)	43 (92)	0.47
9	(Germany) Dieter Lieberwirth	1975–1988	18 (139)	21 (131)	39 (270)	0.14
10	(Germany) Georg Volkert	1965–1969, 1980–1981	37 (136)	0 (0)	37 (136)	0.27

Numbers in brackets indicate appearances made.

== Staff ==
As of 1 July 2024

Position	Name
Head coach	(Germany) Miroslav Klose
Assistant coach	(Argentina) Javier Pinola (Germany) Matthias Kreutzer
Co-trainer analysis	(Germany) Jérôme Polenz
Goalkeeper coach	(Germany) Dennis Neudahm
Head of performance	(Germany) Johannes Wieber
Rehabilitation trainer	(Germany) Gerald Stürzenhofecker (Germany) Johannes Rösch
Transition coordinator	(Germany) Dominik Schmitt
Club doctor	(Germany) Prof. Dr. Werner Krutsch (Germany) Dr. Markus Geßlein (Germany) Dr. Johannes Rüther
Physiotherapist	(Germany) Jens Vergers (Slovakia) Milan Gubov (Germany) Anika Monatzetter
Equipment manager	(Germany) Marko Riegel

== Coaches and chairmen ==
=== Coaches ===
Outstanding coaches of the earlier years include Izidor "Dori" Kürschner (1921, 1922), Fred Spiksley (1913, 1920s), former player Alfred Schaffer (1930s), Dr. Karl Michalke (1930s), Alwin "Alv" Riemke (1940s–1950s) and former player Hans "Bumbes" Schmidt (1940s, 1950s), who notably did not win a single of his four German Championship titles as coach with Nürnberg, but three of them with the long-standing main rivals Schalke 04. He was also four times champion as player, thereof three times with the Club, and once with the earlier archrival SpVgg Greuther Fürth.

Managerial history (Bundesliga era)

No.	Coach	From	To
1	(West Germany) Herbert Widmayer	1 July 1960	30 October 1963
2	(Hungarian People's Republic) Jeno Csaknady	1 November 1963	30 June 1964
3	(West Germany) Gunther Baumann	1 July 1964	30 June 1965
4	(Hungarian People's Republic) Jeno Csaknady	1 July 1965	7 November 1966
5	(Hungarian People's Republic) Jenő Vincze	8 November 1966	31 December 1966
6	(Austria) Max Merkel	3 January 1967	24 March 1969
7	(Austria) Robert Körner	25 March 1969	12 April 1969
8	(West Germany) Kuno Klötzer	13 April 1969	30 June 1970
9	(West Germany) Thomas Barthel	1 July 1970	30 June 1971
10	(Socialist Federal Republic of Yugoslavia) Slobodan Mihajlović	1 July 1971	1 August 1971
11	(West Germany) Fritz Langner	2 August 1971	5 December 1971
12	(Socialist Federal Republic of Yugoslavia) Zlatko Čajkovski	6 December 1971	30 June 1973
13	(West Germany) Hans Tilkowski	1 July 1973	30 June 1976
14	(West Germany) Horst Buhtz	1 July 1976	19 May 1978
15	(West Germany) Werner Kern	20 May 1978	20 December 1978
16	(West Germany) Robert Gebhardt	21 December 1978	30 June 1979
17	(Belgium) Jeff Vliers	1 July 1979	18 August 1979
18	(West Germany) Robert Gebhardt	19 August 1979	30 June 1980
19	(West Germany) Horst Heese	1 July 1980	3 March 1981
20	(West Germany) Fritz Popp	4 March 1981	26 May 1981
21	(West Germany) Fred Hoffmann	27 May 1981	30 June 1981
22	(West Germany) Heinz Elzner	1 July 1981	8 September 1981
23	(West Germany) Udo Klug	9 September 1981	25 October 1983
24	(West Germany) Rudolf Kröner	26 October 1983	6 December 1983
25	(West Germany) Fritz Popp (interim)	7 December 1983	31 December 1983
26	(West Germany) Heinz Höher	1 January 1984	30 June 1988
27	(West Germany) Hermann Gerland	1 July 1988	9 April 1990
28	(West Germany) Dieter Lieberwirth (interim)	10 April 1990	30 June 1990
29	(Netherlands) Arie Haan	1 July 1990	30 June 1991
30	(Germany) Willi Entenmann	1 July 1991	9 November 1993
31	(Germany) Dieter Renner	10 November 1993	2 January 1994
32	(Germany) Rainer Zobel	3 January 1994	31 December 1994
33	(Germany) Günter Sebert	1 January 1995	30 June 1995

No.	Coach	From	To
34	(Germany) Hermann Gerland	1 July 1995	30 April 1996
35	(Germany) Willi Entenmann	1 May 1996	30 August 1997
36	(Germany) Felix Magath	1 September 1997	30 June 1998
37	(Germany) Willi Reimann	1 July 1998	30 November 1998
38	(Germany) Thomas Brunner	1 December 1998	31 December 1998
39	(Germany) Friedel Rausch	1 January 1999	18 February 2000
40	(Germany) Thomas Brunner (interim)	19 February 2000	2 March 2000
41	(Germany) Klaus Augenthaler	3 March 2000	29 April 2003
42	(Germany) Wolfgang Wolf	30 April 2003	31 October 2005
43	(Germany) Dieter Lieberwirth (interim)	1 November 2005	8 November 2005
44	(Germany) Hans Meyer	9 November 2005	11 February 2008
45	(Germany) Thomas von Heesen	12 February 2008	28 August 2008
46	(Germany) Michael Oenning	2 September 2008	21 December 2009
47	(Germany) Dieter Hecking	22 December 2009	23 December 2012
48	(Germany) Michael Wiesinger & (Germany) Armin Reutershahn	23 December 2012	7 October 2013
49	(Germany) Roger Prinzen (interim)	7 October 2013	22 October 2013
50	(Netherlands) Gertjan Verbeek	22 October 2013	23 April 2014
51	(Germany) Roger Prinzen (interim)	23 April 2014	5 June 2014
52	(France) Valérien Ismaël	5 June 2014	10 November 2014
53	(Switzerland) René Weiler	12 November 2014	29 June 2016
54	(Germany) Alois Schwartz	29 June 2016	7 March 2017
55	(Germany) Michael Köllner	7 March 2017	12 February 2019
56	(Germany) Boris Schommers (interim)	12 February 2019	19 May 2019
57	(Austria) Damir Canadi	19 May 2019	4 November 2019
57	(Slovakia) Marek Mintál (interim)	4 November 2019	12 November 2019
58	(Germany) Jens Keller	12 November 2019	29 June 2020
59	(Germany) Michael Wiesinger	29 June 2020	11 July 2020
60	(Germany) Robert Klauß	30 July 2020	3 October 2022
61	(Germany) Markus Weinzierl	6 October 2022	20 February 2023
62	(Germany) Dieter Hecking (interim)	20 February 2023	2 June 2023
63	(Germany) Cristian Fiél	2 June 2023	30 June 2024
64	(Germany) Miroslav Klose	1 July 2024	Present

=== Chairmen ===
- 1900–1904: Christoph Heinz
- 1904–1910: Ferdinand Küspert
- 1910–1912: Christoph Heinz
- 1912–1914: Leopold Neuburger
- 1915–1917: Ferdinand Küspert
- 1917–1919: Konrad Gerstacker
- 1919–1921: Leopold Neuburger
- 1921–1923: Ludwig Bäumler
- 1923: Eduard Kartini
- 1923–1925: Max Oberst
- 1926–1930: Hans Schregle
- 1930–1935: Ludwig Franz
- 1935–1945: Karl Müller
- 1945–1946: Hans Hofmann
- 1946–1947 Hans Schregle
- 1947–1948: Hans Hofmann
- 1948–1963: Ludwig Franz
- 1963–1964: Karl Müller
- 1964–1971: Walter Luther
- 1971–1977: Hans Ehrt
- 1977–1978: Lothar Schmechtig
- 1978–1979: Waldemar Zeitelhack
- 1979–1983: Michael A. Roth
- 1983–1991: Gerd Schmelzer
- 1991–1992: Sven Oberhof
- 1992–1994: Gerhard Voack
- 1994: Georg Haas
- 1994–2009: Michael A. Roth
- 2009–2010: Franz Schäfer
