= 1968–69 1. FC Nürnberg season =

1. FC Nürnberg
1968–69 season
- Chairman: Walter Luther
- Manager: Max Merkel (until 24 March 1969); Robert Körner (25 March 1969 – 12 April 1969); Kuno Klötzer (from 14 April 1969)
- 1. Bundesliga: 17th (relegated)
- DFB-Pokal: Semi-final
- UEFA European Cup: First round
- Top goalscorer: Hans Küppers (10)

1. FC Nürnberg played the 1968–69 season in the Fußball-Bundesliga.

== Season review ==
Despite winning the championship at the end of the previous season, coach Max Merkel decided to make significant changes to the squad. Merkel added 13 new players to the first team squad, and several of the club's more experienced players were sold, including Franz Brungs, the team's leading goalscorer in their championship winning season, and Austrian international August Starek.

Nuremberg started the season poorly, losing their opening two games, but soon recovered and spent the next couple of months in a mid-table position. As reigning champions, the club entered the UEFA European Cup, but lost 5–1 on aggregate to Ajax in the first round. Nuremberg began to struggle from November onwards, and went the next ten games without a win, dropping to the bottom of the table. Merkel was sacked on 24 March and replaced by Kuno Klötzer a few weeks later. With Klötzer in charge, Nuremberg went on to win their next three matches, including a victory against eventual champions Bayern Munich. This was followed by two draws, which took the club to 16th (one place above the relegation zone) with one game in the season remaining. This was a match away at 1. FC Köln, who were also in danger of being relegated. Nuremberg were defeated 3–0, confirming their relegation to the Regionalliga as 17th-placed Borussia Dortmund had won their final match.

== Aftermath ==
Nuremberg's relegation came as a major surprise having won the Bundesliga 12 months earlier – former player Max Morlock described the season as being "like a bad dream". They were the first champions of the Bundesliga to be relegated, and did not return to the top flight until 1978. Max Merkel is the figure often blamed for the club's relegation due to the wholesale changes made to the squad during the pre-season, with Horst Leupold later remarking that he "didn't understand why so many new players joined us after we won the title". Defender Ferdinand Wenauer pointed to more sinister reasons, claiming that goalkeeper Jürgen Rynio had been bribed by Borussia Dortmund, although this was never proven.

== Match results ==
=== Legend ===
Win	Draw	Loss

=== League ===
Game	Date	Opponent	Venue	Result	Attendance	Goalscorers	Notes
1	17 August 1968	Alemannia Aachen	Home	1–4	20,000	Walter (og)	MR
2	24 August 1968	Kickers Offenbach	Away	1–2	33,000	Küppers	MR
3	31 August 1968	Borussia Mönchengladbach	Home	4–0	40,000	Zaczyk, Čebinac (pen), Strehl, Beer	MR
4	4 September 1968	Hannover 96	Away	2–2	40,000	Beer, Nüssing	MR
5	7 September 1968	1. FC Kaiserslautern	Home	1–0	26,000	Čebinac	MR
6	14 September 1968	1860 Munich	Away	0–2	30,000		MR
7	21 September 1968	Hamburger SV	Home	0–0	12,000		MR
8	28 September 1968	Schalke 04	Away	1–4	25,000	Volkert	MR
9	5 October 1968	Hertha BSC	Home	3–0	19,000	Volkert, Zaczyk, Küppers	MR
10	19 October 1968	Eintracht Frankfurt	Away	0–3	20,000		MR
11	26 October 1968	MSV Duisburg	Home	1–1	12,000	Küppers	MR
12	30 October 1968	Eintracht Braunschweig	Away	2–0	18,000	Strehl, Küppers	MR
13	2 November 1968	VfB Stuttgart	Home	1–1	20,000	L. Müller	MR
14	12 November 1968	Bayern Munich	Away	0–3	40,000		MR
15	16 November 1968	Werder Bremen	Home	1–1	10,000	L. Müller	MR
16	30 November 1968	Borussia Dortmund	Away	1–3	16,000	Küppers	MR
17	7 December 1968	1. FC Köln	Home	0–1	11,000		MR
18	11 January 1969	Alemannia Aachen	Away	2–4	22,000	L. Müller, Nüssing	MR
19	18 January 1969	Kickers Offenbach	Home	2–2	45,000	Zaczyk, Čebinac	MR
20	25 January 1969	Borussia Mönchengladbach	Away	1–1	35,000	Volkert	MR
21	1 February 1969	Hannover 96	Home	1–2	30,000	L. Müller (pen)	MR
22	8 February 1969	1. FC Kaiserslautern	Away	1–1	8,000	H. Müller	MR
23	22 February 1969	1860 Munich	Home	3–0	50,000	Küppers (2), Kroth (og)	MR
24	8 March 1969	Schalke 04	Home	1–1	35,000	L. Müller	MR
25	15 March 1969	Hertha BSC	Away	0–2	35,000		MR
26	22 March 1969	Eintracht Frankfurt	Home	1–0	18,000	Wirth (og)	MR
27	29 March 1969	MSV Duisburg	Away	0–1	18,000		MR
28	9 April 1969	Hamburger SV	Away	2–4	22,000	Strehl (2)	MR
29	19 April 1969	Eintracht Braunschweig	Home	2–0	17,000	Nüssing (2)	MR
30	26 April 1969	VfB Stuttgart	Away	3–2	22,000	Nüssing, Volkert (2)	MR
31	17 May 1969	Bayern Munich	Home	2–0	45,000	Volkert (2)	MR
32	23 May 1969	Werder Bremen	Away	3–3	27,000	Küppers (2), Strehl (pen)	MR
33	31 May 1969	Borussia Dortmund	Home	2–2	50,000	Küppers, L. Müller (pen)	MR
34	7 June 1969	1. FC Köln	Away	0–3	53,000		MR

=== Cup ===
Round	Date	Opponent	Venue	Result	Attendance	Goalscorers	Notes
First	5 January 1969	Eintracht Trier	Away	3–1	18,000	Hansen, L. Müller, Nüssing	MR
Second	2 April 1969	Sperber Hamburg	Away	0–0	4,500		MR
Second (replay)	12 April 1969	Sperber Hamburg	Home	7–0	7,000	L. Müller (2), Zaczyk (2), Nüssing, Lehr (2)	MR
Quarter Final	23 April 1969	Hannover 96	Home	1–0	12,000	Čebinac	MR
Semi Final	3 May 1969	Bayern Munich	Away	0–2	25,000		MR

=== Europe ===
Round	Date	Opponent	Venue	Result	Attendance	Goalscorers	Notes
First (1st leg)	18 September 1968	Ajax	Home	1–1	54,000	Volkert	MR
First (2nd leg)	2 October 1968	Ajax	Away	0–4	63,000		MR
Ajax won 5–1 on aggregate

== Player details ==
Pos.	Nat.	Player	League		DFB-Pokal		Europe		Total	
Pos.	Nat.	Player	Apps	Goals	Apps	Goals	Apps	Goals	Apps	Goals
GK	(West Germany)	Jürgen Rynio	25	0	4	0	2	0	31	0
GK	(West Germany)	Roland Wabra	10	0	1	0	1	0	12	0
GK	(West Germany)	Walter Pradt	0	0	-	-	-	-	0	0
DF	(West Germany)	Ferdinand Wenauer	34	0	5	0	2	0	41	0
DF	(West Germany)	Fritz Popp	32	0	3	0	2	0	37	0
DF	(West Germany)	Ludwig Müller	29	6	5	3	1	0	35	9
DF	(West Germany)	Horst Leupold	27	0	0	0	1	0	28	0
DF	(Denmark)	Johnny Hansen	21	0	2	1	2	0	25	1
DF	(West Germany)	Peter Czernotzky	8	0	3	0	-	-	11	0
DF	(West Germany)	Amand Theis	7	0	-	-	-	-	7	0
DF	(West Germany)	Franz Zimmert	1	0	3	0	-	-	4	0
DF	(West Germany)	Ewald Schäffner	0	0	-	-	-	-	0	0
MF	(West Germany)	Klaus Zaczyk	34	3	5	2	2	0	41	5
MF	(West Germany)	Hans Küppers	33	10	4	0	2	0	39	10
MF	(West Germany)	Heinz Müller	28	1	4	0	2	0	34	1
MF	(West Germany)	Heinz Strehl	20	5	3	0	1	0	24	5
MF	(West Germany)	Hans Rigotti	4	0	2	0	1	0	7	0
MF	(West Germany)	Theodor Homann	0	0	-	-	-	-	0	0
FW	(West Germany)	Georg Volkert	28	7	5	0	2	1	35	8
FW	(West Germany)	Erich Beer	25	2	2	0	1	0	28	2
FW	(West Germany)	Dieter Nüssing	23	5	5	2	1	0	29	7
FW	(Socialist Federal Republic of Yugoslavia)	Zvezdan Čebinac	22	3	3	1	1	0	26	4
FW	(West Germany)	Jürgen Lehr	0	0	1	2	-	-	1	2

== Transfers ==
=== In ===
Player	Pos	From	Fee	Date
Erich Beer	FW	SpVgg Fürth		
Peter Czernotzky	DF	Borussia Neunkirchen		
Johnny Hansen	DF	Vejle BK		
Theodor Homann	MF	SSV Werne		
Hans Küppers	MF	1860 Munich	DM 175,000	
Jürgen Lehr	FW	1. FC Nürnberg Amateure		
Dieter Nüssing	FW	1. FC Nürnberg Amateure		
Walter Pradt	GK	1. FC Nürnberg Amateure		
Hans Rigotti	MF	Bayern Munich		
Jürgen Rynio	GK	Karlsruher SC		
Amand Theis	DF	1. FC Nürnberg Amateure		
Klaus Zaczyk	MF	Karlsruher SC		
Franz Zimmert	DF	1. FC Nürnberg Amateure		

=== Out ===
Player	Pos	To	Fee	Date
Horst Blankenburg	FW	Wiener SC	DM 45,000	
Claus-Jürgen Braun	DF	Released		
Franz Brungs	DF	Hertha BSC	DM 200,000	
Manfred Ebenhöh	MF	SpVgg Fürth		
Karl-Heinz Ferschl	MF	Hertha BSC		
Helmut Hilpert	FW	SV Waldhof Mannheim		
Adolf Ruff	FW	1. FC Nürnberg Amateure		
Hubert Schöll	GK	Hamburger SV		
August Starek	MF	Bayern Munich		
Gyula Tóth	GK	Jahn Regensburg		
Wulf-Ingo Usbeck	DF	Released		
