= 1958 DFB-Pokal final =

- Match programme cover
- Event: 1957–58 DFB-Pokal
| Fortuna Düsseldorf | VfB Stuttgart |
| 3 | 4 |
- After extra time
- Date: 16 November 1958
- Venue: Auestadion, Kassel
- Referee: Werner Treichel (West Berlin)
- Attendance: 28,000

The 1958 DFB-Pokal final decided the winner of the 1957–58 DFB-Pokal, the 15th season of Germany's knockout football cup competition. It was played on 16 November 1958 at the Auestadion in Kassel. VfB Stuttgart won the match 4–3 after extra time against Fortuna Düsseldorf, to claim their 2nd cup title.

== Route to the final ==
The DFB-Pokal began with 5 teams in a single-elimination knockout cup competition. There were a total of two rounds leading up to the final. In the qualification round, all but two teams were given a bye. Teams were drawn against each other, and the winner after 90 minutes would advance. If still tied, 30 minutes of extra time was played. If the score was still level, a replay would take place at the original away team's stadium. If still level after 90 minutes, 30 minutes of extra time was played. If the score was still level, a drawing of lots would decide who would advance to the next round.

Note: In all results below, the score of the finalist is given first (H: home; A: away).

| Fortuna Düsseldorf | | Round | VfB Stuttgart |
|---|---|---|---|---|
| Opponent | Result | 1957–58 DFB-Pokal | Opponent | Result |
| Tasmania 1900 Berlin (A) | 2–1 | Semi-finals | 1. FC Saarbrücken (A) | 4–1 |

== Match ==
=== Details ===
16 November 1958
14:00 CET

| Fortuna Düsseldorf | 3–4 (a.e.t.) | VfB Stuttgart |
|---|---|---|
| K. Hoffmann 50'; Wolfframm 52', 79' | Report | Praxl 36'; Geiger 62'; Waldner 68' (pen.); Weise 113' |

Auestadion, Kassel
Attendance: 28,000
Referee: Werner Treichel (West Berlin)

| Fortuna Düsseldorf | VfB Stuttgart |

| GK | 1 | (West Germany) Heinz Klose |
| RB | | (West Germany) Werner Vigna |
| LB | | (West Germany) Erich Juskowiak |
| RH | | (West Germany) Matthias Mauritz |
| CH | | (West Germany) Günter Jäger |
| LH | | (West Germany) Karl Hoffmann |
| OR | | (West Germany) Bernhard Steffen |
| IR | | (West Germany) Franz-Josef Wolfframm |
| CF | | (West Germany) Heinz Jansen |
| IL | | (West Germany) Jupp Derwall |
| OL | | (West Germany) Dieter Wöske |
Manager:
(West Germany) Hermann Lindemann

| GK | 1 | (West Germany) Günter Sawitzki |
| RB | | (West Germany) Hans Eisele |
| LB | | (West Germany) Günter Seibold |
| RH | | (West Germany) Oskar Hartl |
| CH | | (West Germany) Rudolf Hoffmann |
| LH | | (West Germany) Robert Schlienz (c) |
| OR | | (West Germany) Erwin Waldner |
| IR | | (West Germany) Rolf Geiger |
| CF | | (West Germany) Lothar Weise |
| IL | | (West Germany) Rolf Blessing |
| OL | | (West Germany) Dieter Praxl |
Manager:
(West Germany) Georg Wurzer

Match rules

- 90 minutes.
- 30 minutes of extra time if necessary.
- Replay if scores still level.
- No substitutions.
