= 1962 DFB-Pokal final =

- Match programme cover
- Event: 1961–62 DFB-Pokal
1. FC Nürnberg	Fortuna Düsseldorf
2	1
- After extra time
- Date: 29 August 1962
- Venue: Niedersachsenstadion, Hanover
- Referee: Rolf Seekamp (Bremen)
- Attendance: 41,000

The 1962 DFB-Pokal final decided the winner of the 1961–62 DFB-Pokal, the 19th season of Germany's knockout football cup competition. It was played on 29 August 1962 at the Niedersachsenstadion in Hanover. 1. FC Nürnberg won the match 2–1 after extra time against Fortuna Düsseldorf, to claim their 3rd cup title.

== Route to the final ==
The DFB-Pokal began with 16 teams in a single-elimination knockout cup competition. There were a total of three rounds leading up to the final. Teams were drawn against each other, and the winner after 90 minutes would advance. If still tied, 30 minutes of extra time was played. If the score was still level, a replay would take place at the original away team's stadium. If still level after 90 minutes, 30 minutes of extra time was played. If the score was still level, a drawing of lots would decide who would advance to the next round.

Note: In all results below, the score of the finalist is given first (H: home; A: away).

1. FC Nürnberg		Round	Fortuna Düsseldorf
Opponent	Result	1961–62 DFB-Pokal	Opponent	Result
Saar 05 Saarbrücken (A)	3–0	Round of 16	Sportfreunde Lebenstedt (H)	2–1
VfV Hildesheim (H)	11–0	Quarter-finals	1. FC Saarbrücken (A); (H)	2–2 (a.e.t.); 2–1 (replay)
Eintracht Frankfurt (H)	4–2	Semi-finals	Schalke 04 (H)	3–2

== Match ==
=== Details ===
29 August 1962
17:00 CET

1. FC Nürnberg	2–1 (a.e.t.)	Fortuna Düsseldorf
Haseneder 71'; Wild 93'	Report	Wolfframm 58'

Niedersachsenstadion, Hanover
Attendance: 41,000
Referee: Rolf Seekamp (Bremen)

1. FC Nürnberg	Fortuna Düsseldorf

GK	1	(West Germany) Roland Wabra
RB		(West Germany) Paul Derbfuß
LB		(West Germany) Helmut Hilpert
RH		(West Germany) Gustav Flachenecker
CH		(West Germany) Ferdinand Wenauer (c)
LH		(West Germany) Stefan Reisch
OR		(West Germany) Kurt Dachlauer
IR		(West Germany) Kurt Haseneder
CF		(West Germany) Heinz Strehl
IL		(West Germany) Tasso Wild
OL		(West Germany) Richard Albrecht
Manager:
(West Germany) Herbert Widmayer

GK	1	(West Germany) Albert Görtz
RB		(West Germany) Werner Vigna
LB		(West Germany) Horst Zimmermann
RH		(West Germany) Karl Hoffmann
CH		(West Germany) Manfred Krafft
LH		(West Germany) Hermann Straschitz
OR		(West Germany) Bernhard Steffen
IR		(West Germany) Franz-Josef Wolfframm
CF		(West Germany) Hilmar Hoffer
IL		(West Germany) Hans-Erwin Volberg
OL		(West Germany) Peter Meyer
Manager:
(West Germany) Jupp Derwall

Match rules

- 90 minutes.
- 30 minutes of extra time if necessary.
- Replay if scores still level.
- No substitutions.
