= 1967–68 1. FC Nürnberg season =

1. FC Nürnberg
1967–68 season
- Chairman: Walter Luther
- Manager: Max Merkel
- 1. Bundesliga: 1st
- DFB-Pokal: Quarter-final
- Top goalscorer: Franz Brungs (25)
Home colours	Away colours

1. FC Nürnberg played the 1967–68 season in the Fußball-Bundesliga.

== Match results ==
=== Legend ===
Win	Draw	Loss

=== Bundesliga ===
Date	Opponent	Venue	Result (Note: 1. FC Nürnberg's score written first)	Scorers	Attendance	Ref.
19 August 1967 – 16:00	Karlsruher SC	Home	2–0	Strehl (2)	32,000	
26 August 1967 – 16:00	Borussia Neunkirchen	Away	2–2	Strehl, L. Müller	20,000	
2 September 1967 – 16:00	Hamburger SV	Home	4–0	Brungs (2), Starek, Čebinac	50,000	
9 September 1967 – 16:00	Eintracht Frankfurt	Away	2–1	Strehl, Brungs	50,000	
13 September 1967 – 20:00	Borussia Mönchengladbach	Home	1–0	Ferschl	62,000	
16 September 1967 – 16:00	Eintracht Braunschweig	Away	3–0	Strehl, Brungs (2)	16,000	
23 September 1967 – 16:00	1860 Munich	Home	1–1	Strehl	58,000	
30 September 1967 – 16:00	Schalke 04	Away	0–0	—	25,000	
14 October 1967 – 16:00	VfB Stuttgart	Home	5–1	Strehl (2), Volkert (2), Ferschl	45,000	
21 October 1967 – 16:00	Werder Bremen	Away	4–0	Schütz (o.g.), Ferschl, Brungs, Volkert	45,000	
28 October 1967 – 16:00	1. FC Kaiserslautern	Home	4–1	Strehl, Ferschl, Brungs (2)	42,000	
4 November 1967 – 16:00	1. FC Köln	Away	3–3	Strehl, Brungs, Leupold	52,000	
11 November 1967 – 16:00	MSV Duisburg	Away	0–2	—	35,000	
18 November 1967 – 16:00	Alemannia Aachen	Home	4–1	Brungs (3), Strehl	30,000	
25 November 1967 – 16:00	Hannover 96	Away	1–1	Starek	55,000	
2 December 1967 – 16:00	Bayern Munich	Home	7–3	Strehl, Volkert, Brungs (5)	65,000	
9 December 1967 – 15:30	Borussia Dortmund	Away	2–1	Brungs, Čebinac	31,000	
6 January 1968 – 15:30	Karlsruher SC	Away	1–1	Volkert	45,000	
13 January 1968 – 15:30	Borussia Neunkirchen	Home	3–0	Brungs (2), H. Müller	14,000	
20 January 1968 – 15:30	Hamburger SV	Away	1–3	Volkert	45,000	
3 February 1968 – 15:30	Eintracht Frankfurt	Home	0–2	—	30,000	
10 February 1968 – 15:30	Borussia Mönchengladbach	Away	1–1	Brungs	32,000	
17 February 1968 – 15:30	Eintracht Braunschweig	Home	3–1	Čebinac, Volkert (2)	37,000	
2 March 1968 – 16:00	1860 Munich	Away	2–1	Starek, Strehl	37,000	
9 March 1968 – 16:00	Schalke 04	Home	2–3	Strehl, Starek	26,000	
16 March 1968 – 15:30	VfB Stuttgart	Away	1–1	Strehl (pen.)	55,000	
23 March 1968 – 15:30	Werder Bremen	Home	0–0	—	25,000	
30 March 1968 – 15:30	1. FC Kaiserslautern	Away	0–1	—	28,000	
6 April 1968 – 15:30	1. FC Köln	Home	2–1	Volkert, Starek	45,000	
20 April 1968 – 15:30	MSV Duisburg	Home	4–1	van Haaren (o.g.), Strehl, Brungs (2)	32,000	
27 April 1968 – 15:30	Alemannia Aachen	Away	0–2	—	29,000	
11 May 1968 – 15:30	Hannover 96	Home	2–1	Brungs, Laszig (o.g.)	30,000	
18 May 1968 – 15:30	Bayern Munich	Away	2–0	Brungs, Strehl	27,000	
25 May 1968 – 15:30	Borussia Dortmund	Home	2–1	H. Müller, Strehl	60,000	

=== DFB-Pokal ===
Round	Date	Opponent	Venue	Result	Scorers	Attendance	Ref.
First round	27 January 1968 – 14:00	Bayer 04 Leverkusen	Away	2–0	Strehl, Starek	15,000	
Round of 16	24 February 1968 – 15:30	Preußen Münster	Home	4–0	H. Müller	5,500	
Quarter-final	10 April 1968 – 20:00	Bayern Munich	Away	1–2	Brungs	40,000	

== Player details ==
Pos.	Nat.	Player	League		DFB-Pokal		Total	
Pos.	Nat.	Player	Apps	Goals	Apps	Goals	Apps	Goals
GK	(West Germany)	Roland Wabra	34	0	2	0	36	0
GK	(Socialist Federal Republic of Yugoslavia)	Gyula Toth	1	0	1	0	2	0
GK	(West Germany)	Adolf Ruff	0	0	0	0	0	0
DF	(West Germany)	Horst Leupold	34	1	3	0	37	1
DF	(West Germany)	Ferdinand Wenauer	34	0	3	0	37	0
DF	(West Germany)	Ludwig Müller	33	1	3	0	36	1
DF	(West Germany)	Fritz Popp	32	0	3	0	35	0
DF	(West Germany)	Helmut Hilpert	4	0	1	0	5	0
DF	(West Germany)	Ewald Schäffner	0	0	0	0	0	0
MF	(West Germany)	Karl-Heinz Ferschl	32	4	2	0	34	4
MF	(West Germany)	Heinz Müller	29	2	3	1	32	3
MF	(Austria)	August Starek	24	5	1	1	25	6
MF	(West Germany)	Horst Blankenburg	0	0	1	0	1	0
FW	(West Germany)	Franz Brungs	34	25	3	1	37	26
FW	(Socialist Federal Republic of Yugoslavia)	Zvezdan Čebinac	33	3	2	0	35	3
FW	(West Germany)	Heinz Strehl	33	18	3	3	36	21
FW	(West Germany)	Georg Volkert	33	9	3	1	36	10
FW	(West Germany)	Hubert Schöll	3	0	0	0	3	0
FW	(West Germany)	Claus-Jürgen Braun	0	0	0	0	0	0
FW	(West Germany)	Manfred Ebenhöh	0	0	0	0	0	0
FW	(West Germany)	Wulf-Ingo Usbeck	0	0	0	0	0	0

== Transfers ==
=== In ===
Player	Pos	From	Fee	Date
Horst Blankenburg	MF	VfL Heidenheim		
Claus-Jürgen Braun	FW	1. FC Nürnberg Amateure		
Zvezdan Čebinac	FW	PSV Eindhoven		
Adolf Ruff	GK	1. FC Nürnberg Amateure		
Ewald Schäffner	DF	1. FC Nürnberg Amateure		
August Starek	MF	Rapid Vienna		

=== Out ===
Player	Pos	To	Fee	Date
Reinhold Adelmann	FW	Hertha BSC		
Manfred Greif	FW	Hertha BSC		
Jovan Miladinovic	MF	Released		
Heinrich Müller	MF	Retired		
Edwin Preißler	DF	Waldhof Mannheim		
Stefan Reisch	MF	Neuchâtel Xamax		
Herbert Renner	MF	FC St. Gallen		
Horst-Dieter Strich	GK	Bayern Hof		
Tasso Wild	MF	Hertha BSC		

== See also ==
- 1967–68 Fußball-Bundesliga
