= List of 1. FC Nürnberg seasons =

1. FC Nürnberg is a German football club based in Nuremberg, Bavaria. The club is the country's second most successful side, having been crowned German champions nine times, and won more national championship titles than any other club before the inception of the Bundesliga.

Nürnberg were founding members of the Bundesliga, and won the league once in 1968. The club has also won the DFB-Pokal four times.

Nürnberg have struggled to emulate the success of their earlier years, and have been relegated from the Bundesliga on eight occasions - more times than any other German club.

== Key ==
Key to league record:

- Pld = Matches played
- W = Matches won
- D = Matches drawn
- L = Matches lost
- GF = Goals for
- GA = Goals against
- Pts = Points
- Pos = Final position

Key to rounds:

- NH = Not held
- QR = Qualification round
- GS = Group stage
- R1 = Round 1
- R2 = Round 2
- R3 = Round 3
- QF = Quarter-finals
- SF = Semi-finals
- RU = Runners-up
- W = Winners

Champions	Runners-up	Promoted	Relegated	Top scorer in division	First Tier	Second Tier	Third Tier

== Early years (until 1933) ==
Season	League										South German Championship	German Championship	Other	
Season	Division	Tier	Pld	W	D	L	GF	GA	Pts	Pos	South German Championship	German Championship	Other	
1904–05 Autumn	Nürnberg-Fürther Fußball-Bund	–	5	5	0	0	38	0	10	1st	–	–	–	
1904–05 Spring	Nürnberg-Fürther Fußball-Bund	–	4	4	0	0	31	5	8	1st	–	–	–	
1905–06	A-Klasse Nordbayern	1								1st^{[A]}	–	–	–	
1906–07	A-Klasse Mittelfranken	1	16	16	0	0	58	10	32	1st^{[B]}	RU	–	–	
1907–08	A-Klasse Mittelfranken	1	6	5	1	0	37	6	11	1st^{[C]}	2nd	–	–	
1908–09	A-Klasse Ostkreis Gr. Mittelfranken	1	8	7	1	0	68	8	15	1st^{[D]}	2nd	–	–	
1909–10	A-Klasse Ostkreis Gr. Nord	1	10	10	0	0	73	8	20	1st^{[E]}	–	–	–	
1910–11	Ostkreisliga	1	18	15	0	3	90	25	30	2nd	–	–	–	
1911–12	Ostkreisliga	1	20	12	2	6	55	35	26	4th	–	–	–	
1912–13	Ostkreisliga	1	14	8	2	4	48	17	18	3rd	–	–	–	
1913–14	Ostkreisliga	1	14	7	2	5	38	23	16	2nd	–	–	–	
1914–15	Ostkreisliga	1	The season was abandoned due to World War I											
1915–16	Gau Mittelfranken	1	17	17	0	0	147	7	34	1st	W	NH	–	
1916–17	Gau Mittelfranken	1	12				71	9	22	1st^{[F]}	–	NH	–	
1917–18	Gau Mittelfranken	1								1st	W	NH	–	
1918–19	Gau Mittelfranken	1								1st	NH	NH	Süddeutscher Pokal	W
1919–20	Kreisliga Nordbayern	1	18	18	0	0	115	6	36	1st	W	W	–	
1920–21	Kreisliga Nordbayern	1	18	17	1	0	85	8	35	1st	W	W	–	
1921–22	Kreisliga Nordbayern Gr.I	1	14	12	2	0	81	8	26	1st^{[G]}	–	RU^{[H]}	–	
1922–23	Kreisliga Nordbayern	1	14	10	2	2	39	12	22	2nd	–	–	–	
1923–24	Bezirksliga Bayern	1	14				27	8	20	1st	W	W	Süddeutscher Pokal	W
1924–25	Bezirksliga Bayern	1	14				44	13	24	1st	RU	W	–	
1925–26	Bezirksliga Bayern	1	14				34	18	18	2nd	–	–	–	
1926–27	Bezirksliga Bayern	1	18				64	17	33	1st	W	W	–	
1927–28	Bezirksliga Bayern Gr. Nordbayern	1	16				58	10	27	2nd	–	–	–	
1928–29	Bezirksliga Bayern Gr. Nordbayern	1	14				51	15	24	1st^{[I]}	W	SF	–	
1929–30	Bezirksliga Bayern Gr. Nordbayern	1	14				33	14	22	2nd^{[J]}	–	SF	–	
1930–31	Bezirksliga Bayern Gr. Nordbayern	1	14	9	2	3	50	14	20	2nd	–	–	–	
1931–32	Bezirksliga Bayern Gr. Nordbayern	1	18	15	0	3	56	17	30	1st	3rd	SF	–	
1932–33	Bezirksliga Bayern Gr. Nordbayern	1	18	17	1	0	68	19	35	1st	GS	–	–	

== Gauliga era (1933–1945) ==
Season	League										German Championship	Tschammer- Pokal	Top goalscorer(s)	
Season	Division	Tier	Pld	W	D	L	GF	GA	Pts	Pos	German Championship	Tschammer- Pokal	Player(s)	Goals
1933–34	Gauliga Bayern	1	22	15	4	3	61	26	34	1st	RU	NH		
1934–35	Gauliga Bayern	1	20	9	7	4	43	26	25	2nd	–	NH		
1935–36	Gauliga Bayern	1	18	13	5	0	36	12	31	1st	W	W		
1936–37	Gauliga Bayern	1	18	13	1	4	47	16	27	1st	RU	–		
1937–38	Gauliga Bayern	1	18	11	5	2	35	16	27	1st	GS	R1		
1938–39	Gauliga Bayern	1	18	9	2	7	28	33	20	5th	–	SF		
1939–40	Gauliga Bayern	1	18	13	3	2	56	13	29	1st	GS	W		
1940–41	Gauliga Bayern	1	22	14	3	5	52	24	31	2nd	–	RU		
1941–42	Gauliga Bayern	1	22	14	1	7	64	33	29	4th	–	R3		
1942–43	Gauliga Nordbayern	1	20	20	0	0	125	17	40	1st	R1	–	(Germany) Max Morlock	54
1943–44	Gauliga Nordbayern	1	18	13	2	3	85	23	28	1st	SF	QF		
1944–45	Gauliga Mittelfranken	1	The season was abandoned due to World War II											

== Oberliga era (1945–1963) ==
Season	League										German Championship	DFB-Pokal	Europe		Other		Top goalscorer(s)	
Season	Division	Tier	Pld	W	D	L	GF	GA	Pts	Pos	German Championship	DFB-Pokal	Europe		Other		Player(s)	Goals
1945–46	Oberliga Süd	1	30	20	5	5	86	44	45	2nd	NH	NH	NH		–		(Germany) Max Morlock	24
1946–47	Oberliga Süd	1	38	28	6	4	108	31	62	1st	NH	NH	NH		–		(Germany) Hans Pöschl	38
1947–48	Oberliga Süd	1	38	28	4	6	88	37	60	1st	W	NH	NH		–		(Germany) Max Morlock	30
1948–49	Oberliga Süd	1	30	11	5	14	49	55	27	11th	–	NH	NH		–		(Germany) Max Morlock	15
1949–50	Oberliga Süd	1	30	12	7	11	52	40	31	8th	–	NH	NH		–			
1950–51	Oberliga Süd	1	34	20	7	7	93	46	47	1st	GS	NH	NH		–		(Germany) Max Morlock	28
1951–52	Oberliga Süd	1	30	17	9	4	72	33	43	2nd	GS	NH	NH		–		(Germany) Max Morlock	26
1952–53	Oberliga Süd	1	30	11	7	12	67	61	29	8th	–	R2	NH		–		(Germany) Max Morlock	20
1953–54	Oberliga Süd	1	30	15	8	7	71	44	38	4th	–	QF	NH		Süddeutscher Pokal	W	(Germany) Horst Schade	22
1954–55	Oberliga Süd	1	30	12	5	13	64	51	29	9th	–	R2	NH		–		(Germany) Horst Schade	18
1955–56	Oberliga Süd	1	30	12	7	11	42	41	31	7th	–	–	–		–			
1956–57	Oberliga Süd	1	30	21	5	4	76	33	47	1st	GS	–	–		–		(Germany) Max Schmid	18
1957–58	Oberliga Süd	1	30	19	3	8	74	45	41	2nd	GS	–	–		–		(Germany) Günther Glomb (Germany) Max Morlock	14
1958–59	Oberliga Süd	1	30	19	5	6	80	38	43	3rd	–	–	–		–		(Germany) Max Morlock	20
1959–60	Oberliga Süd	1	30	15	4	11	73	54	34	6th	–	–	–		–		(Germany) Heinz Strehl	30
1960–61	Oberliga Süd	1	30	23	2	5	96	30	48	1st	W	–	–		–		(Germany) Heinz Strehl	22
1961–62	Oberliga Süd	1	30	20	3	7	70	30	43	1st	RU	W	European Cup	QF	–		(Germany) Gustav Flachenecker	14
1962–63	Oberliga Süd	1	30	18	5	7	87	41	41	2nd	GS	R1	Cup Winners Cup	SF	–		(Germany) Kurt Haseneder	24

== Bundesliga era (1963–) ==
Season	League										DFB-Pokal	Europe		Other		Top goalscorer(s)	
Season	Division	Tier	Pld	W	D	L	GF	GA	Pts	Pos	DFB-Pokal	Europe		Other		Player(s)	Goals
1963–64	Bundesliga	1	30	11	7	12	45	56	29	9th	R1	–		–		(Germany) Heinz Strehl	16
1964–65	Bundesliga	1	30	11	10	9	44	38	32	6th	SF	–		–		(Germany) Heinz Strehl	15
1965–66	Bundesliga	1	34	14	11	9	54	43	39	6th	SF	Inter-Cities Fairs Cup	R1	–		(Germany) Franz Brungs	13
1966–67	Bundesliga	1	34	12	10	12	43	50	34	10th	QR	Inter-Cities Fairs Cup	R1	–		(Germany) Franz Brungs	12
1967–68	Bundesliga	1	34	19	9	6	71	37	47	1st	QF	–		–		(Germany) Franz Brungs	25
1968–69	Bundesliga	1	34	9	11	14	45	55	29	17th	SF	Intertoto Cup	W	–		(Germany) Hans Küppers	10
1968–69	Bundesliga	1	34	9	11	14	45	55	29	17th	SF	European Cup	R1	–		(Germany) Hans Küppers	10
1969–70	Regionalliga Süd	2	38	24	9	5	64	29	57	3rd	SF	–		–		(Germany) Dieter Nüssing	14
1970–71	Regionalliga Süd	2	36	23	9	4	81	39	55	1st^{[K]}	–	–		–		(Germany) Manfred Drexler	16
1971–72	Regionalliga Süd	2	36	12	10	14	49	62	34	9th	–	–		–		(Austria) August Starek	13
1972–73	Regionalliga Süd	2	34	17	7	10	61	52	41	5th	–	–		–		(Socialist Federal Republic of Yugoslavia) Miodrag Petrović	16
1973–74	Regionalliga Süd	2	34	18	8	8	63	42	44	2nd^{[L]}	R2	–		–		(Germany) Dieter Nüssing	15
1974–75	2. Bundesliga Süd	2	38	17	8	13	70	52	42	6th	R2	–		–		(Germany) Hans Walitza	21
1975–76	2. Bundesliga Süd	2	38	24	6	8	78	42	54	2nd^{[M]}	R3	–		–		(Germany) Dieter Nüssing (Germany) Hans Walitza	21
1976–77	2. Bundesliga Süd	2	38	18	13	7	77	51	49	5th	QF	–		–		(Germany) Hans Walitza	21
1977–78	2. Bundesliga Süd	2	38	22	9	7	75	46	53	2nd^{[N]}	R1	–		–		(Germany) Horst Weyerich	14
1978–79	Bundesliga	1	34	8	8	18	36	67	24	17th	SF	–		–		(Germany) Detlef Szymanek (Germany) Horst Weyerich	5
1979–80	2. Bundesliga Süd	2	40	26	9	5	88	38	61	1st	R3	–		–		(Germany) Herbert Heidenreich	13
1980–81	Bundesliga	1	34	11	6	17	47	57	28	14th	R3	–		–		(Germany) Georg Volkert	10
1981–82	Bundesliga	1	34	11	6	17	53	72	28	13th	RU	–		–		(Germany) Werner Heck	14
1982–83	Bundesliga	1	34	11	6	17	44	70	28	14th	R2	–		–		(Germany) Werner Heck	11
1983–84	Bundesliga	1	34	6	2	26	38	85	14	18th	R1	–		–		(Germany) Manfred Burgsmüller	12
1984–85	2. Bundesliga	2	38	23	4	11	71	45	50	1st	R2	Intertoto Cup	GS	–		(Germany) Dieter Eckstein	12
1985–86	Bundesliga	1	34	12	5	17	51	54	29	12th	R2	–		–		(Germany) Dieter Eckstein	12
1986–87	Bundesliga	1	34	12	11	11	62	62	35	9th	R2	–		–		(Norway) Jörn Andersen	14
1987–88	Bundesliga	1	34	13	11	10	44	40	37	5th	R3	–		–		(Germany) Dieter Eckstein	15
1988–89	Bundesliga	1	34	8	10	16	36	54	26	14th	R2	UEFA Cup	R1	–		(Germany) Martin Wagner	7
1989–90	Bundesliga	1	34	11	11	12	42	46	33	8th	R2	–		–		(Germany) Reiner Wirsching	7
1990–91	Bundesliga	1	34	10	9	15	40	54	29	15th	R2	–		–		(Germany) Jörg Dittwar (Germany) Marc Oechler	7
1991–92	Bundesliga	1	38	18	7	13	54	51	43	7th	R2	–		–		(Germany) Dieter Eckstein	12
1992–93	Bundesliga	1	34	10	8	16	30	47	28	13th	QF	–		–		(Germany) Dieter Eckstein	10
1993–94	Bundesliga	1	34	10	8	16	41	55	28	16th	R2	–		–		(Argentina) Sergio Zárate	13
1994–95	2. Bundesliga	2	34	8	14	12	38	47	30	15th	R1	–		–		(Iceland) Arnar Gunnlaugsson	8
1995–96	2. Bundesliga	2	34	9	12	13	33	40	33^{[O]}	17th	QF	–		–		(United States) Joe-Max Moore	8
1996–97	Regionalliga Süd	3	34	25	5	4	75	26	80	1st	R2	–		Mittelfranken Cup	RU	(Germany) Markus Kurth	16
1997–98	2. Bundesliga	2	34	17	8	9	52	35	59	3rd	R1	–		–		(Germany) Michael Wiesinger	11
1998–99	Bundesliga	1	34	7	16	11	40	50	37	16th	R2	–		–		(North Macedonia) Saša Ćirić	13
1999–2000	2. Bundesliga	2	34	15	10	9	54	46	55	4th	R1	–		–		(Bulgaria) Dimtcho Beliakov	14
2000–01	2. Bundesliga	2	34	20	5	9	58	35	65	1st	R3	–		–		(Germany) Martin Driller	11
2001–02	Bundesliga	1	34	10	4	20	34	57	34	15th	R1	–		–		(Germany) Cacau	6
2002–03	Bundesliga	1	34	8	6	20	33	60	30	17th	R3	–		–		(North Macedonia) Saša Ćirić	12
2003–04	2. Bundesliga	2	34	18	7	9	68	45	61	1st	R2	–		–		(Slovakia) Marek Mintál	18
2004–05	Bundesliga	1	34	10	8	16	55	63	38	14th	R2	–		–		(Slovakia) Marek Mintál	24
2005–06	Bundesliga	1	34	12	8	14	49	51	44	8th	R3	–		–		(Slovakia) Róbert Vittek	16
2006–07	Bundesliga	1	34	11	15	8	43	32	48	6th	W	–		–		(Russia) Ivan Saenko	9
2007–08	Bundesliga	1	34	7	10	17	35	51	31	16th	R2	UEFA Cup	R32	DFL-Ligapokal	SF	(Bosnia and Herzegovina) Zvjezdan Misimović	10
2008–09	2. Bundesliga	2	34	16	12	6	51	29	60	3rd^{[P]}	R2	–		–		(Slovakia) Marek Mintál	16
2009–10	Bundesliga	1	34	8	7	19	32	58	31	16th^{[Q]}	R2	–		–		(Switzerland) Albert Bunjaku	12
2010–11	Bundesliga	1	34	13	8	13	45	47	47	6th	QF	–		–		(Germany) Christian Eigler	8
2011–12	Bundesliga	1	34	12	6	16	38	49	42	10th	R3	–		–		(Czech Republic) Tomáš Pekhart (Germany) Daniel Didavi	9
2012–13	Bundesliga	1	34	11	11	12	39	47	44	10th	R1	–		–		(Sweden) Per Nilsson	6
2013–14	Bundesliga	1	34	5	11	18	37	70	26	17th	R1	–		–		(Switzerland) Josip Drmić	17
2014–15	2. Bundesliga	2	34	13	6	15	42	47	45	9th	R1	–		–		(Slovakia) Jakub Sylvestr	9
2015–16	2. Bundesliga	2	34	19	8	7	68	41	65	3rd^{[R]}	R3	–		–		(Germany) Niclas Füllkrug	14
2016–17	2. Bundesliga	2	34	12	6	16	46	52	42	12th	R2	–		–		(Austria) Guido Burgstaller	14
2017–18	2. Bundesliga	2	34	17	9	8	61	39	60	2nd	R16	–		–		(Germany) Hanno Behrens	15
2018–19	Bundesliga	1	34	3	10	21	26	68	19	18th	R16	–		–		(Sweden) Mikael Ishak	6
2019–20	2. Bundesliga	2	34	8	13	13	45	58	37	16th^{[S]}	R2	–		–		(Germany) Robin Hack	10
2020–21	2. Bundesliga	2	34	11	11	12	46	51	44	11th	R1	–		–		(Germany) Manuel Schäffler	10
2021–22	2. Bundesliga	2	34	14	9	11	49	49	51	8th	R2	–		–		(Austria) Nikola Dovedan	7
2022–23	2. Bundesliga	2	34	10	9	15	32	49	49	14th	QF	–		–		(Switzerland) Kwadwo Duah	11
2024–25	2. Bundesliga	2	34	14	6	14	60	57	48	10th	R2	–		–		(Greece) Stefanos Tzimas	12
2025–26	2. Bundesliga	2	34	12	10	12	47	45	46	8th	R1	–		–		(Italy) Mohamed Ali Zoma	14

== Notes ==
A. Nürnberg qualified for the South German Championship, but chose not to participate.
B. Defeated MTV München 1879 to qualify for the South German Championship.
C. Defeated Bayern Munich and MTV Augsburg to qualify for the South German Championship.
D. Defeated MTV München 1879 to qualify for the South German Championship.
E. Failed to qualify for the South German Championship, finishing 2nd behind Bayern Munich in the group.
F. Failed to qualify for the South German Championship, losing to Bayern Munich.
G. Failed to qualify for the South German Championship, losing to SpVgg Fürth. However, they qualified for the German Championship as defending champions.
H. The championship was awarded to Hamburg after Nürnberg were reduced to seven men in the final. HSV later declined the title.
I. Defeated SpVgg Fürth in a playoff to win the league, after both sides finished level on points.
J. Qualified for the German Championship as the best second or third placed side in the Bezirksliga Bayern.
K. Finished 4th in the promotion play-off group.
L. Finished 2nd in the promotion play-off group.
M. Lost to Borussia Dortmund in the promotion play-off.
N. Defeated Rot-Weiss Essen in the promotion play-off.
O. Nürnberg were deducted 6 points for a breach of the licensing regulations.
P. Defeated Energie Cottbus in the promotion/relegation play-off.
Q. Defeated Augsburg in the promotion/relegation play-off.
R. Lost to Eintracht Frankfurt in the promotion/relegation play-off.
S. Defeated FC Ingolstadt in the relegation play-off.
