= List of DFB-Pokal top scorers =

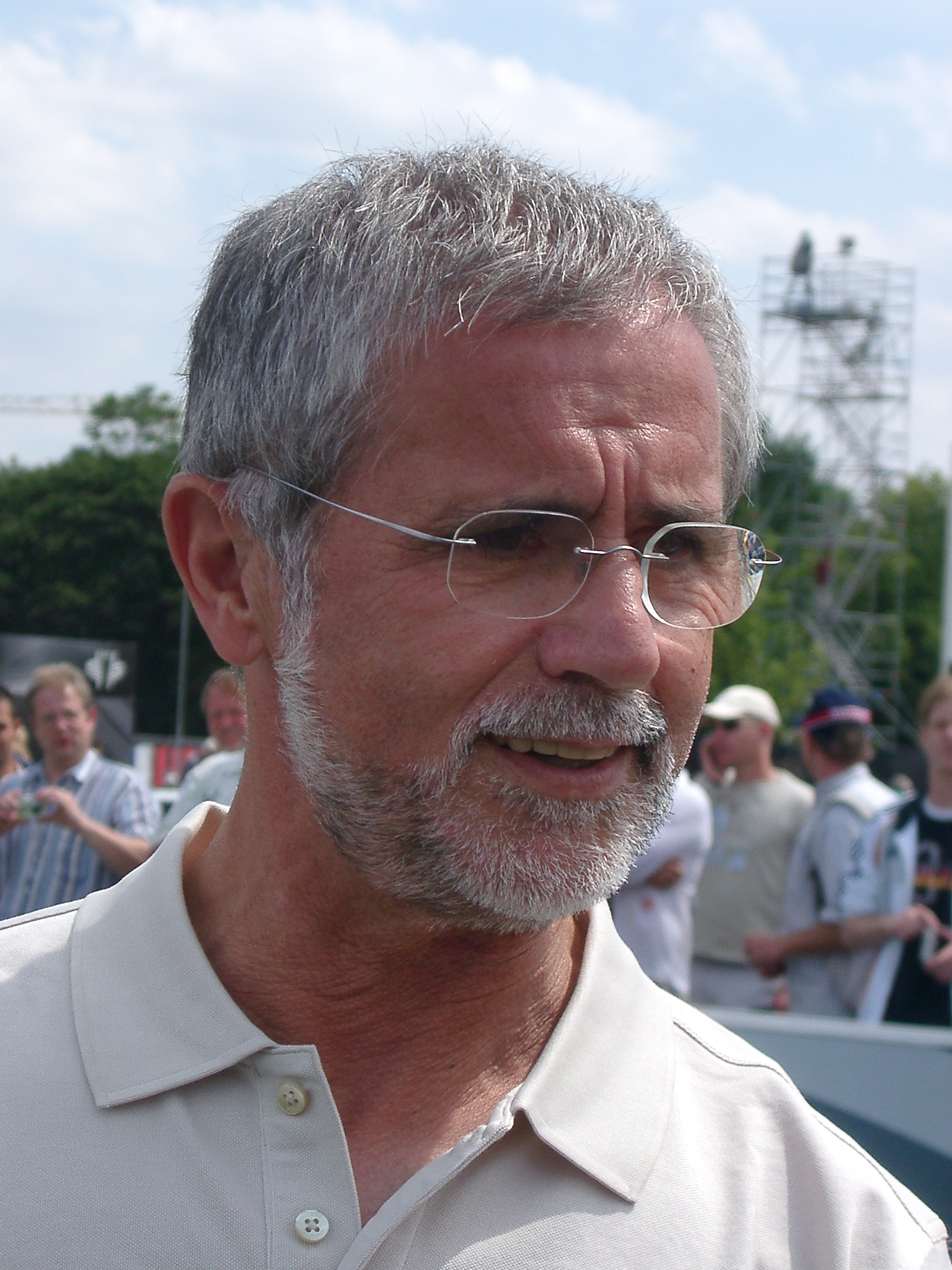
Gerd Müller holds the record for the most goals scored in the DFB-Pokal, with 78.

The list of DFB-Pokal top scorers includes the all-time top scorers of the DFB-Pokal, as well as the top scorers of each season of the competition since its inception as the Tschammerpokal in 1935. Gerd Müller is the all-time top scorer in the DFB-Pokal, having scored 78 goals in 62 appearances for Bayern Munich. The record for the most seasons as top scorer is held by Robert Lewandowski, with five titles. So far only Dieter Müller and Hannes Löhr of 1. FC Köln, along with Claudio Pizarro and Lewandowski of Bayern Munich have successfully defended their title as top scorers. Dieter Müller holds jointly with Ernst Wilimowski of 1860 Munich the record of the most goals scored in a single cup campaign, with 14.

== All-time top scorers ==
As of 30 October 2024

The table includes all players to have scored 20 or more goals.

Rank	Player	Goals	Apps	Ratio	Years	Club(s)
1	(Germany) Gerd Müller	78	62	1.26	1966–1978	Bayern Munich
2	(Germany) Dieter Müller	48	44	1.09	1973–1988	1. FC Köln, VfB Stuttgart, 1. FC Saarbrücken, Kickers Offenbach
3	(Germany) Klaus Fischer	46	60	0.77	1969–1987	1860 Munich, Schalke 04, 1. FC Köln, VfL Bochum
4	(Germany) Manfred Burgsmüller	40	50	0.8	1974–1990	Rot-Weiss Essen, Bayer Uerdingen, Borussia Dortmund, 1. FC Nürnberg, Rot-Weiß Oberhausen, Werder Bremen
4	(Germany) Hannes Löhr	40	65	0.62	1963–1977	Sportfreunde Saarbrücken, 1. FC Köln
6	(Germany) Klaus Allofs	39	61	0.64	1975–1992	Fortuna Düsseldorf, 1. FC Köln, Werder Bremen
6	(Poland) Robert Lewandowski	39	50	0.78	2010–2022	Borussia Dortmund, Bayern Munich
8	(Germany) Thomas Müller	36	67	0.54	2009–2025	Bayern Munich
9	(Germany) Ronnie Worm	35	43	0.81	1972–1985	MSV Duisburg, Eintracht Braunschweig
10	(Peru) Claudio Pizarro	34	58	0.59	1999–2019	Werder Bremen, Bayern Munich
11	(Germany) Karl Allgöwer	31	48	0.65	1977–1991	Stuttgarter Kickers, VfB Stuttgart
12	(Germany) Dieter Hoeneß	28	32	0.88	1975–1986	VfB Stuttgart, Bayern Munich
12	(Germany) Erwin Kostedde	28	38	0.74	1966–1982	Preußen Münster, MSV Duisburg, Kickers Offenbach, Hertha BSC, Borussia Dortmund, Werder Bremen, VfL Osnabrück
14	(Germany) Jupp Heynckes	27	43	0.63	1966–1977	Borussia Mönchengladbach, Hannover 96
14	(Germany) Ernst Kalwitzki	27	36	0.75	1935–1942	Schalke 04
16	(Germany) Erich Beer	26	47	0.55	1969–1982	1. FC Nürnberg, Rot-Weiss Essen, Hertha BSC, 1860 Munich
16	(Germany) Franz Binder (Note: As a result of the annexation of Austria by Nazi Germany on 13 March 1938, Binder had become a German citizen.)	26	15	1.73	1938–1941	Rapid Wien
16	(Germany) Heinz Flohe	26	65	0.4	1967–1979	1. FC Köln, 1860 Munich
16	(Germany) Mario Gómez	26	36	0.72	2004–2019	VfB Stuttgart, Bayern Munich, VfL Wolfsburg
16	(Germany) Ernst Kuzorra	26	39	0.67	1935–1943	Schalke 04
16	(Germany) Helmut Schön	26	20	1.3	1937–1943	Dresdner SC
22	(Germany) Hans-Joachim Abel	25	33	0.76	1973–1984	Fortuna Düsseldorf, Westfalia Herne, VfL Bochum, Schalke 04
22	(Germany) Stefan Kuntz	25	49	0.51	1981–1998	Borussia Neunkirchen, VfL Bochum, Bayer Uerdingen, 1. FC Kaiserslautern, Arminia Bielefeld
22	(Germany) Frank Neubarth	25	41	0.61	1980–1995	Concordia Hamburg, Werder Bremen
22	(Germany) Karl-Heinz Rummenigge	25	42	0.6	1974–1984	Bayern Munich
26	(Germany) Bernd Hölzenbein	24	53	0.45	1969–1981	Eintracht Frankfurt
26	(Germany) Bruno Labbadia	24	43	0.56	1984–2002	Darmstadt 98, Hamburger SV, 1. FC Kaiserslautern, Bayern Munich, 1. FC Köln, Werder Bremen, Arminia Bielefeld, Karlsruher SC
26	(Germany) Frank Mill	24	57	0.42	1976–1996	Rot-Weiss Essen, Borussia Mönchengladbach, Borussia Dortmund, Fortuna Düsseldorf
26	(Germany) Bernd Rupp	24	35	0.69	1966–1973	Borussia Mönchengladbach, Werder Bremen, 1. FC Köln
26	(Germany) Uwe Seeler	24	32	0.75	1954–1972	Hamburger SV
31	(Germany) Horst Hrubesch	23	31	0.74	1976–1985	Rot-Weiss Essen, Hamburger SV, Borussia Dortmund
31	(Germany) Wolfgang Overath	23	55	0.42	1964–1977	1. FC Köln
33	(Germany) Thomas Allofs	22	39	0.56	1978–1991	Fortuna Düsseldorf II, Fortuna Düsseldorf, 1. FC Kaiserslautern, 1. FC Köln
33	(Germany) Dieter Herzog	22	39	0.56	1970–1981	Fortuna Düsseldorf, Bayer Leverkusen
33	(Germany) Carsten Jancker	22	26	0.85	1993–2005	1. FC Köln, Bayern Munich, 1. FC Kaiserslautern
33	(Germany) Bernd Nickel	22	54	0.41	1968–1982	Eintracht Frankfurt
33	(Germany) Christian Schreier	22	37	0.59	1981–1995	VfL Bochum, Bayer Leverkusen, Fortuna Düsseldorf, Rot-Weiss Essen
33	(Germany) Rüdiger Wenzel	22	45	0.49	1974–1989	FC St. Pauli, Eintracht Frankfurt, Fortuna Düsseldorf
39	(Austria) **Martin Harnik**	21	28	0.75	2007–	Werder Bremen II, Werder Bremen, VfB Stuttgart, Hannover 96
39	(Bosnia and Herzegovina) Vedad Ibišević	21	40	0.53	2006–2020	Alemannia Aachen, TSG Hoffenheim, VfB Stuttgart, Hertha BSC, Schalke 04
39	(Germany) Roland Wohlfarth	21	32	0.66	1981–1995	MSV Duisburg, Bayern Munich, VfL Bochum
42	(Germany) Hans-Jörg Criens	20	36	0.56	1980–1994	VfR Neuss, Borussia Mönchengladbach, 1. FC Nürnberg
42	(Germany) Miroslav Klose	20	38	0.53	2000–2011	1. FC Kaiserslautern, Werder Bremen, Bayern Munich
42	(Germany) Nils Petersen	20	37	0.54	2007–2023	Carl Zeiss Jena, Energie Cottbus, Bayern Munich, Werder Bremen, SC Freiburg
42	(Germany) Uwe Rahn	20	39	0.51	1980–1992	Borussia Mönchengladbach, 1. FC Köln, Eintracht Frankfurt
42	(Germany) Thomas Remark	20	28	0.71	1977–1986	Röchling Völklingen, Hertha BSC, Waldhof Mannheim
42	(New Zealand) Wynton Rufer	20	27	0.74	1989–1994	Werder Bremen
42	(Germany) Michael Rummenigge	20	37	0.54	1983–1993	Bayern Munich, Borussia Dortmund
42	(Germany) Fritz Walter	20	38	0.53	1981–1997	Waldhof Mannheim, VfB Stuttgart, Arminia Bielefeld, SSV Ulm
Bold indicates active player in Germany

== Top scorers by season ==
The following lists all of the top scorers in each individual season.

=== Tschammerpokal ===
Year	Player(s)	Club(s)	Goals
1935	(Germany) Ernst Kuzorra	Schalke 04	9
1936	(Germany) Hermann Budde	VfL Benrath	7
1936	(Germany) Ernst Poertgen	Schalke 04	7
1937	(Germany) Kurt Männer	BC Hartha	7
1938	(Germany) Helmut Schön	Dresdner SC	10
1939	(Germany) Edmund Adamkiewicz	Eintracht Frankfurt, Hamburger SV	11
1939	(Germany) Franz Binder	Rapid Wien	11
1940	(Germany) Fritz Machate	Dresdner SC (C)	10
1941	(Germany) Edmund Conen	Stuttgarter Kickers	8
1942	(Germany) Ernst Wilimowski	1860 Munich (C)	14
1943	(Germany) Karl Decker	First Vienna (C)	10
1943	(Germany) Rudolf Noack	First Vienna (C)	10
C Champions Record number of goals

=== DFB-Pokal ===
Season	Player(s)	Club(s)	Goals
1952–53	(West Germany) Franz Islacker	Rot-Weiss Essen (C)	3
1953–54	(West Germany) Georg Stollenwerk	1. FC Köln	2
1953–54	(West Germany) Erwin Waldner	VfB Stuttgart (C)	2
1954–55	(Luxembourg) Antoine Kohn	Karlsruher SC (C)	2
1954–55	(West Germany) Ernst Kunkel	Karlsruher SC (C)	2
1954–55	(West Germany) Helmut Sadlowski	Schalke 04	2
1954–55	(West Germany) Dieter Seeler	Altona 93	2
1954–55	(West Germany) Kurt Sommerlatt	Karlsruher SC (C)	2
1954–55	(West Germany) Oswald Traub	Karlsruher SC (C)	2
1955–56	(West Germany) Heinz Ruppenstein	Karlsruher SC (C)	2
1955–56	(West Germany) Uwe Seeler	Hamburger SV	2
1955–56	(West Germany) Bernhard Termath	Karlsruher SC (C)	2
1956–57	(West Germany) Rudolf Jobst	Bayern Munich (C)	2
1957–58	(West Germany) Rolf Geiger	VfB Stuttgart (C)	3
1958–59	(West Germany) Manfred Rummel	Schwarz-Weiß Essen (C)	4
1959–60	(West Germany) Albert Brülls	Borussia München Gladbach (C)	2
1959–60	(West Germany) Gustav Witlatschil	Karlsruher SC	2
1960–61	(West Germany) Klaus Hänel	Werder Bremen (C)	3
1961–62	(West Germany) Gustav Flachenecker	1. FC Nürnberg (C)	2
1961–62	(West Germany) Kurt Haseneder	1. FC Nürnberg (C)	2
1961–62	(West Germany) Tasso Wild	1. FC Nürnberg (C)	2
1961–62	(West Germany) Franz-Josef Wolfframm	Fortuna Düsseldorf	2
1962–63	(West Germany) Uwe Seeler	Hamburger SV (C)	3
1963–64	(West Germany) Rudolf Brunnenmeier	1860 Munich (C)	5
1964–65	(West Germany) Christian Breuer	Alemannia Aachen	4
1964–65	(West Germany) Lothar Emmerich	Borussia Dortmund (C)	4
1964–65	(West Germany) Waldemar Gerhardt	Schalke 04	4
1964–65	(West Germany) Kurt Haseneder	Schwaben Augsburg	4
1964–65	(West Germany) Willi Koslowski	Schalke 04	4
1964–65	(West Germany) Tasso Wild	1. FC Nürnberg	4
1965–66	(West Germany) Rainer Ohlhauser	Bayern Munich (C)	5
1965–66	(West Germany) Peter Osterhoff	FC St. Pauli	5
1966–67	(West Germany) Gerd Müller	Bayern Munich (C)	7
1967–68	(West Germany) Hannes Löhr	1. FC Köln (C)	5
1968–69	(West Germany) Gerd Müller	Bayern Munich (C)	7
1969–70	(West Germany) Hannes Löhr	1. FC Köln	6
1970–71	(West Germany) Gerd Müller	Bayern Munich (C)	10
1971–72	(West Germany) Klaus Fischer	Schalke 04 (C)	7
1971–72	(West Germany) Hannes Löhr	1. FC Köln	7
1971–72	(West Germany) Wolfgang Overath	1. FC Köln	7
1971–72	(West Germany) Bernd Rupp	1. FC Köln	7
1972–73	(West Germany) Hannes Löhr	1. FC Köln	8
1973–74	(West Germany) Bernd Hölzenbein	Eintracht Frankfurt (C)	6
1974–75	(West Germany) Hermann Lindner	Rot-Weiss Essen	6
1975–76	(West Germany) Klaus Toppmöller	1. FC Kaiserslautern	8
1976–77	(West Germany) Dieter Müller	1. FC Köln (C)	14
1977–78	(West Germany) Dieter Müller	1. FC Köln (C)	8
1978–79	(West Germany) Dieter Hoeneß	VfB Stuttgart	8
1979–80	(West Germany) Klaus Allofs	Fortuna Düsseldorf (C)	9
1979–80	(West Germany) Manfred Burgsmüller	Borussia Dortmund	9
1980–81	(West Germany) Jimmy Hartwig	Hamburger SV	7
1980–81	(West Germany) Horst Hrubesch	Hamburger SV	7
1980–81	(West Germany) Thomas Remark	Hertha BSC	7
1981–82	(West Germany) Karl-Heinz Rummenigge	Bayern Munich (C)	7
1982–83	(West Germany) Stephan Engels	1. FC Köln (C)	6
1983–84	(West Germany) Klaus Fischer	1. FC Köln	5
1983–84	(West Germany) Ronnie Worm	Eintracht Braunschweig	5
1984–85	(West Germany) Manfred Dum	Union Solingen	5
1985–86	(West Germany) Karl Allgöwer	VfB Stuttgart	8
1986–87	(West Germany) Dirk Kurtenbach	Stuttgarter Kickers	8
1987–88	(West Germany) Stefan Kuntz	Bayer Uerdingen	5
1988–89	(West Germany) Christian Schreier	Bayer Leverkusen	7
1989–90	(West Germany) Stefan Kuntz	1. FC Kaiserslautern (C)	5
1989–90	(New Zealand) Wynton Rufer	Werder Bremen	5
1990–91	(Germany) Michael Tönnies	MSV Duisburg	6
1991–92	(Germany) Fritz Walter	VfB Stuttgart	7
1992–93	(Germany) Andreas Thom	Bayer Leverkusen (C)	6
1993–94	(New Zealand) Wynton Rufer	Werder Bremen (C)	5
1994–95	(Germany) Heiko Herrlich	Borussia Mönchengladbach (C)	6
1995–96	(Russia) Vladimir Beschastnykh	Werder Bremen	4
1995–96	(Germany) Thomas Häßler	Karlsruher SC	4
1995–96	(Czech Republic) Pavel Kuka	1. FC Kaiserslautern (C)	4
1996–97	(Germany) Bernhard Winkler	1860 Munich	4
1997–98	(Germany) Carsten Jancker	Bayern Munich (C)	6
1998–99	(Germany) Achim Weber	Rot-Weiß Oberhausen	6
1999–2000	(Bosnia and Herzegovina) Adnan Kevrić	Stuttgarter Kickers	8
2000–01	(Netherlands) Arie van Lent	Borussia Mönchengladbach	6
2001–02	(Bulgaria) Dimitar Berbatov	Bayer Leverkusen	6
2002–03	(Brazil) Giovane Élber	Bayern Munich (C)	6
2003–04	(Brazil) Aílton	Werder Bremen (C)	6
2003–04	(Croatia) Ivan Klasnić	Werder Bremen (C)	6
2004–05	(Germany) Carsten Jancker	1. FC Kaiserslautern	6
2004–05	(Peru) Claudio Pizarro	Bayern Munich (C)	6
2005–06	(Peru) Claudio Pizarro	Bayern Munich (C)	5
2006–07	(Brazil) Cacau	VfB Stuttgart	5
2007–08	(Germany) Mario Gómez	VfB Stuttgart	6
2008–09	(Bosnia and Herzegovina) Edin Džeko	VfL Wolfsburg	6
2008–09	(Croatia) Ivica Olić	Hamburger SV	6
2009–10	(Paraguay) Lucas Barrios	Borussia Dortmund	4
2009–10	(Germany) Thomas Müller	Bayern Munich (C)	4
2009–10	(Germany) Sahr Senesie	Eintracht Trier	4
2010–11	(Croatia) Srđan Lakić	1. FC Kaiserslautern	7
2011–12	(Poland) Robert Lewandowski	Borussia Dortmund (C)	7
2012–13	(Germany) Mario Gómez	Bayern Munich (C)	6
2013–14	(Germany) Thomas Müller	Bayern Munich (C)	8
2014–15	(Germany) Stefan Kießling	Bayer Leverkusen	6
2014–15	(Germany) Sven Schipplock	TSG Hoffenheim	6
2015–16	(Armenia) Henrikh Mkhitaryan	Borussia Dortmund	5
2016–17	(Poland) Robert Lewandowski	Bayern Munich	5
2017–18	(Poland) Robert Lewandowski	Bayern Munich	6
2018–19	(Poland) Robert Lewandowski	Bayern Munich (C)	7
2019–20	(Poland) Robert Lewandowski	Bayern Munich (C)	6
2020–21	(England) Jadon Sancho	Borussia Dortmund (C)	6
2021–22	(Germany) Robert Glatzel	Hamburger SV	5
2022–23	(France) Randal Kolo Muani	Eintracht Frankfurt	6
2023–24	(Morocco) Amine Adli	Bayer Leverkusen (C)	5
2024–25	(Germany) Nick Woltemade	VfB Stuttgart (C)	5
2025–26	(England) Harry Kane	Bayern Munich (C)	10
C Champions Record number of goals

=== Rankings ===
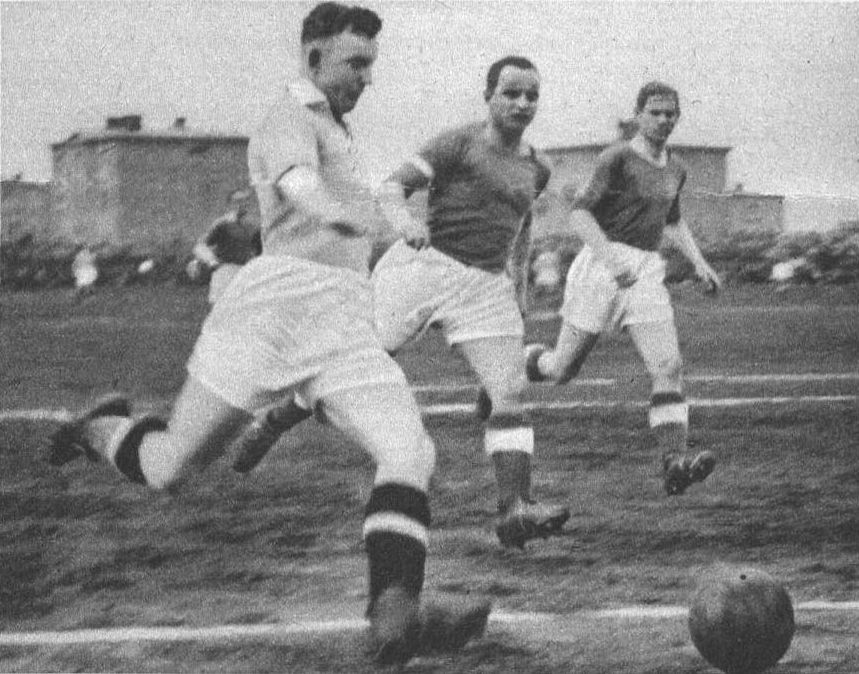
Ernst Wilimowski holds the record, along with Dieter Müller, for the most goals scored in a cup campaign, with 14.

==== By player ====
Rank	Player	Titles
1	(Poland) Robert Lewandowski	5
2	(West Germany) Hannes Löhr	4
3	(West Germany) Gerd Müller	3
4	(West Germany) Klaus Fischer	2
4	(Germany) Mario Gómez	2
4	(West Germany) Kurt Haseneder	2
4	(Germany) Carsten Jancker	2
4	(Germany) Stefan Kuntz	2
4	(West Germany) Dieter Müller	2
4	(Germany) Thomas Müller	2
4	(Peru) Claudio Pizarro	2
4	(New Zealand) Wynton Rufer	2
4	(West Germany) Uwe Seeler	2
4	(West Germany) Tasso Wild	2

==== By club ====
Rank	Club	Titles
1	Bayern Munich	21
2	1. FC Köln	10
3	Karlsruher SC	8
3	VfB Stuttgart	8
5	Werder Bremen	6
5	Borussia Dortmund	6
5	Hamburger SV	6
5	Schalke 04	6
9	1. FC Kaiserslautern	5
9	Bayer Leverkusen	5
11	1. FC Nürnberg	4
12	Stuttgarter Kickers	3
12	1860 Munich	3
12	Borussia Mönchengladbach	3
12	Eintracht Frankfurt	3
16	Rot-Weiss Essen	2

==== By nationality ====
Rank	Country	Titles
1	/ Germany	92
2	Poland	5
3	Brazil	3
3	Croatia	3
5	Bosnia and Herzegovina	2
5	England	2
5	New Zealand	2
5	Peru	2
9	Armenia	1
9	Bulgaria	1
9	Czech Republic	1
9	France	1
9	Luxembourg	1
9	Morocco	1
9	Netherlands	1
9	Paraguay	1
9	Russia	1

== See also ==
- List of Bundesliga top scorers
