= Jürgen Rynio =

German footballer

Personal information
- Date of birth: 1 April 1948 (age 78)
- Place of birth: Gelsenkirchen, Germany
- Position: Goalkeeper

Youth career
- VfL Resse 08

Senior career*
Years	Team	Apps	(Gls)
1966–1967	Eintracht Gelsenkirchen		
1967–1968	Karlsruher SC	21	(0)
1968–1969	1. FC Nürnberg	25	(0)
1969–1974	Borussia Dortmund	92	(0)
1974–1976	Rot-Weiss Essen	26	(0)
1976–1979	FC St. Pauli	106	(0)
1979–1986	Hannover 96	196	(0)
Total		466	(0)

Managerial career
- 1985–1986: Hannover 96
- * Club domestic league appearances and goals

Jürgen Rynio (born 1 April 1948) is a German retired professional footballer who played as a goalkeeper. Born in Gelsenkirchen, Rynio played in the Bundesliga for Karlsruher SC, 1. FC Nürnberg, Borussia Dortmund, Rot-Weiss Essen, FC St. Pauli and Hannover 96, appearing in over 450 games in the top two tiers of German football during his career.

== Career ==
Rynio was born on 1 April 1948, and grew up in Resse, a district in the city of Gelsenkirchen. He started his career in his hometown, playing for VfL Resse 08 before joining Eintracht Gelsenkirchen in the Regionalliga West. In 1967, he joined Bundesliga side Karlsruher SC. He made his debut on 2 September in a 0–0 draw against Alemannia Aachen, and went on to make 21 league appearances during the 1967–68 season as Karlsruhe were relegated to the Regionalliga Süd.

Rynio returned to the Bundesliga next season after being signed by reigning champions 1. FC Nürnberg. Rynio appeared 25 times for Der Club, but a disastrous campaign saw the team finish in 17th place, becoming the first league champions to be relegated from the division. Rynio has since been criticised by teammate Ferdinand Wenauer for his role in the team's 2–2 draw with Borussia Dortmund in the penultimate game of the season. Rynio had reportedly agreed to join Dortmund in the summer, and Wenauer felt that the keeper had conceded at least one stoppable goal. Rynio later claimed that he had been unlucky to concede the goal, and although he subsequently did sign a contract with Dortmund at the end of the season, the club had not made him an offer until after the game between the two sides.

Rynio played regularly for Dortmund over the next three seasons, making 81 Bundesliga appearances, but suffered relegation for the third time in his career in 1971–72, a season which included an 11–1 defeat to eventual league champions Bayern Munich. He remained with Dortmund following the club's relegation, but made only 11 appearances in two seasons in the Regionalliga West.

In 1974, he moved to Rot-Weiss Essen, playing 26 league games in two seasons before moving to FC St. Pauli in 1976. He helped the club win promotion to the Bundesliga during his first season at the club, but were relegated back down to the 2. Bundesliga North at the end of the following season. In 1979, he joined Hannover 96, where he remained in the second division for the next five seasons as first choice goalkeeper.

Rynio initially brought his playing career to an end in 1984, but remained with Hannover as a goalkeeping coach. He had a brief spell as head coach at Hannover during the 1985–86 season following the dismissal of Werner Biskup, remaining in charge until the appointment of Jörg Berger in January 1986. During the same season, he came out of retirement to play in goal after an injury to Hannover's first choice keeper Ralf Raps. In the two games he played, Rynio conceded 12 goals – losing 5–0 at home to Bayern Munich, followed by a 7–0 away defeat to VfB Stuttgart. The Stuttgart game was a record defeat for Hannover in the Bundesliga, and three of the goals conceded were penalty kicks scored by Michael Nushöhr – the only player to accomplish this in a Bundesliga game.

Hannover were relegated at the end of that season. As a result, Rynio, along with Andreas Keim and Stephan Paßlack, is one of three players to be relegated from the Bundesliga five times, and is the only player to have suffered this feat with five different clubs.

== Personal life ==
Rynio was a skilled power engineer – a trade which he began learning from the age of 14. After finishing his playing career, Rynio eventually moved away from football and became the manager of Rynio Wohnen KG in Bergen, Lower Saxony, a care home for people with mental and physical disabilities.
