= Walter Pratt =

Walter Pratt may refer to:

- Walter L. Pratt (1868–1934), American businessman and politician from New York
- Walter F. Pratt (born 1946), American law professor and administrator
- Babe Pratt (Walter Peter Pratt, 1916–1988), Canadian ice hockey player

== See also ==
- Walter Pradt (1949–2014), German football player and manager
