= Hilpert =

Hilpert is a German surname. Notable people with the surname include:

- Carl Hilpert (1888–1947), German Wehrmacht general
- Fritz Hilpert (born 1956), German musician
- Heinz Hilpert (1890–1967), German actor, screenwriter and film director
- Helmut Hilpert (1937–1997), German footballer
- Marcus Hilpert (born 1971), German tennis player
- Werner Hilpert (1897–1957), German politician

== Fictional Character ==
- Stephan Hilpert, a fictional character in the anime Gundam SEED DESTINY
