= Hans Eisele (footballer) =

German footballer (1940–2002)

Personal information
- Date of birth: 7 August 1940
- Place of birth: Stuttgart, Germany
- Date of death: 20 October 2002 (aged 62)
- Height: 1.73 m (5 ft 8 in)
- Position: Defender

Senior career*
Years	Team	Apps	(Gls)
1958–1971	VfB Stuttgart	196	(4)
1971–1972	DSV Alpine		
- * Club domestic league appearances and goals

Hans Eisele (7 August 1940 – 20 October 2002) was a German footballer who played as a defender. He spent eight seasons in the Bundesliga with VfB Stuttgart. The best result he achieved in the league was fifth place.

== Honours ==
VfB Stuttgart

- DFB-Pokal: 1957–58
