= Amand Theis =

German footballer

Personal information
- Date of birth: 19 November 1949 (age 76)
- Place of birth: Hellenhahn-Schellenberg, West Germany
- Height: 1.85 m (6 ft 1 in)
- Position: Defender

Youth career
- –1968: SV Hellenhahn

Senior career*
Years	Team	Apps	(Gls)
1968–1972	1. FC Nürnberg	108	(6)
1972–1977	Kickers Offenbach	136	(23)
1977–1980	Borussia Dortmund	84	(6)
1980–1984	Fortuna Düsseldorf	105	(10)
Total		433	(45)
- * Club domestic league appearances and goals

Amand Theis (born 19 November 1949) is a German retired professional footballer who made a total of 296 appearances in the Bundesliga during his playing career.

== Personal life ==
Theis was born in Hellenhahn-Schellenberg. He is the grandfather of the German footballer Luca Kilian.
