= 1957–58 DFB-Pokal =

Tournament details
- Country: West Germany
- Teams: 5

Final positions
- Champions: VfB Stuttgart
- Runner-up: Fortuna Düsseldorf

Tournament statistics
- Matches played: 4
- Goals scored: 21 (5.25 per match)

The 1957–58 DFB-Pokal was the 15th season of the annual German football cup competition. It began on 25 June 1958 and ended on 16 November 1958. 4 teams competed in the tournament of two rounds. In the final VfB Stuttgart defeated Fortuna Düsseldorf 4–3 after extra time.

== Matches ==
=== Qualification round ===
25 June 1958

| SC Tasmania 1900 Berlin | 1 – 1 (a.e.t.) | VfL Osnabrück |

==== Replay ====
2 July 1958

| VfL Osnabrück | 1 – 3 | SC Tasmania 1900 Berlin |

=== Semi-finals ===
21 September 1958

| SC Tasmania 1900 Berlin | 1 – 2 | Fortuna Düsseldorf |

21 September 1958

| 1. FC Saarbrücken | 1 – 4 | VfB Stuttgart |

=== Final ===
16 November 1958
14:00 CET

| Fortuna Düsseldorf | 3–4 (a.e.t.) | VfB Stuttgart |
|---|---|---|
| K. Hoffmann 50'; Wolfframm 52', 79' | Report | Praxl 36'; Geiger 62'; Waldner 68' (pen.); Weise 113' |

Auestadion, Kassel
Attendance: 28,000
Referee: Werner Treichel (West Berlin)
