= Hellenhahn-Schellenberg =

- Municipality
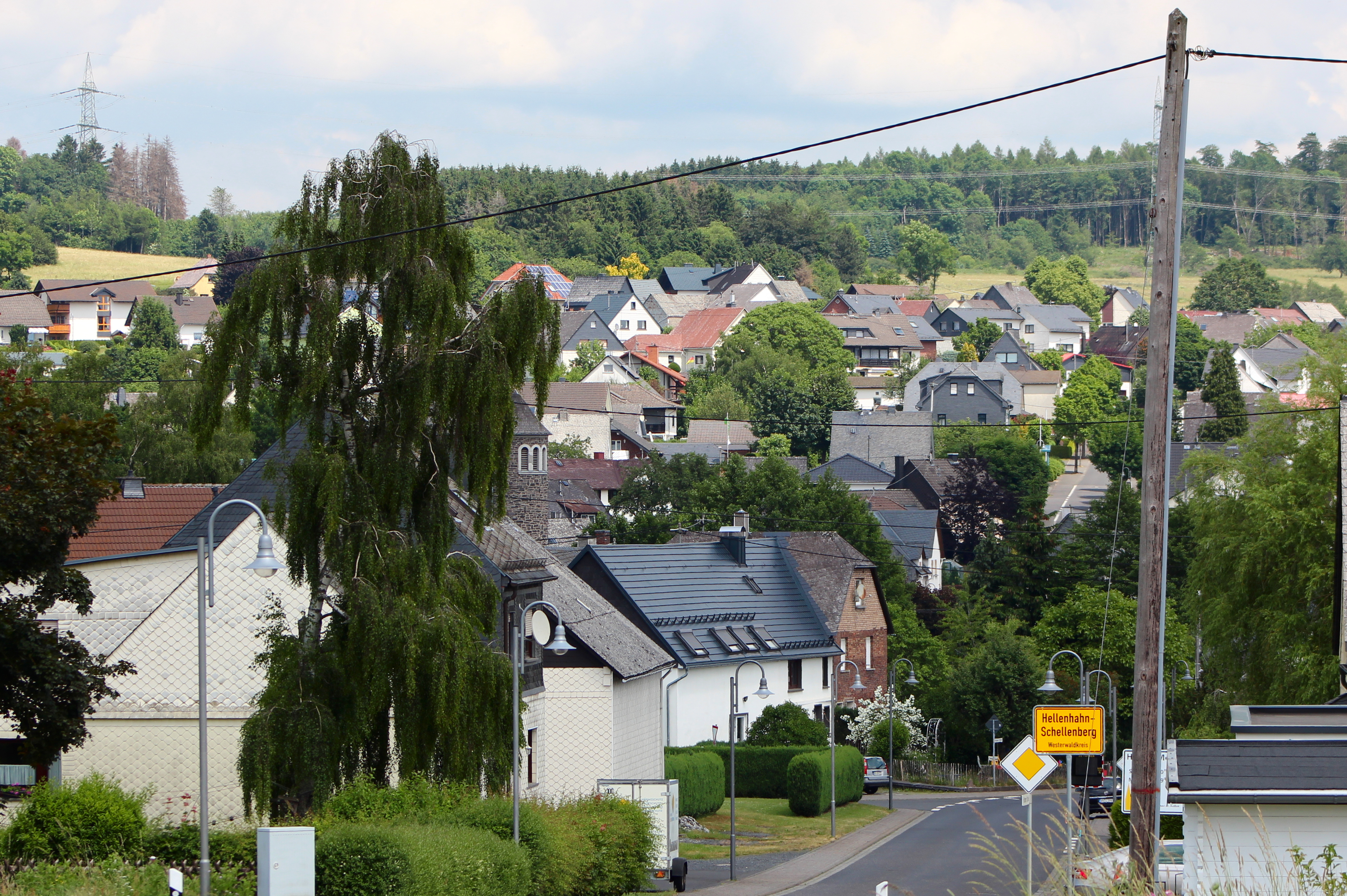

- Coat of arms

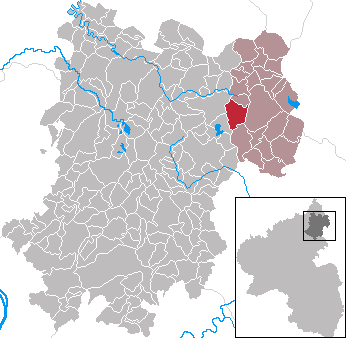
- Location of Hellenhahn-Schellenberg within Westerwaldkreis district
- Interactive map of Hellenhahn-Schellenberg
- Location within Germany Location within Rhineland-Palatinate
- Coordinates: 50°36′46″N 8°01′35″E
- Country: Germany
- State: Rhineland-Palatinate
- District: Westerwaldkreis
- Municipal assoc.: Rennerod

Government
  - Mayor (2019–24): Birgit Schmidt

Area
  - Total: 7.28 km^{2} (2.81 sq mi)
- Elevation: 460 m (1,510 ft)

Population (2025-12-31)
  - Total: 1,237
  - Density: 170/km^{2} (440/sq mi)
- Time zone: UTC+01:00 (CET)
  - Summer (DST): UTC+02:00 (CEST)
- Postal codes: 56479
- Dialling codes: 02664
- Vehicle registration: WW
- Website: www.rennerod.de

Hellenhahn-Schellenberg is a municipality in Westerwaldkreis, Rhineland-Palatinate, Germany.

== Transport ==
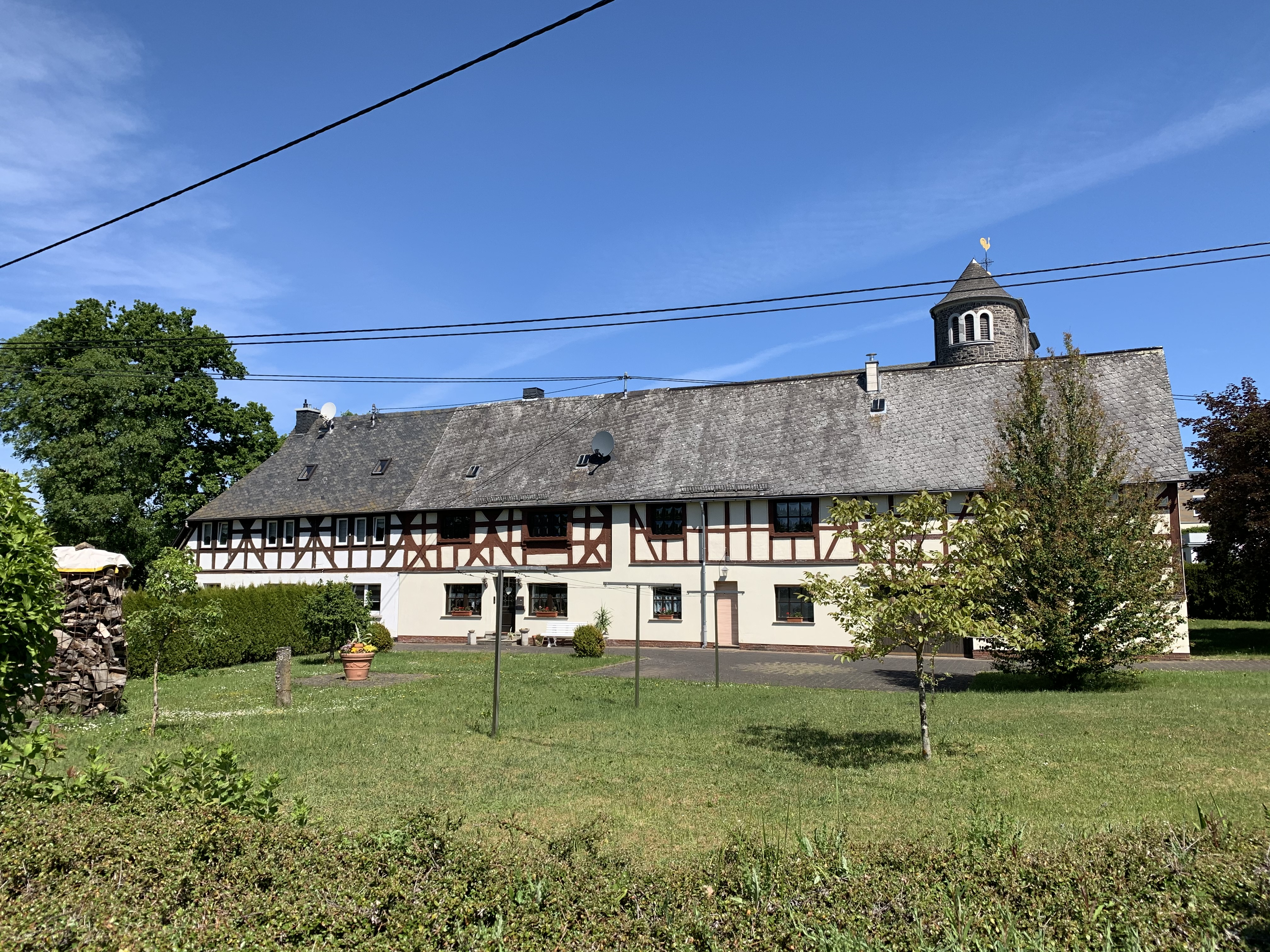
Hellenhahn, main road, house no. 7

The local bus line 477 goes from Rehe via Rennerod and Westerburg to Montabaur, the line 480 serves Hellenhahn-Schellenberg on its route from Westerburg via Pottum and Rennerod to Driedorf and Krombachtalsperre.

The village is located in the area of the transport association Verkehrsverbund Rhein-Mosel (VRM), zone number 445.

== Clubs and Organizations ==
The voluntary organisation IG Westerwald-Querbahn e. V., which aims to preserve and reactivate the Herborn–Montabaur railway Cross Westerwald railway (Herborn - Rennerod - Westerburg -Wallmerod - Montabaur), is located at Neue Strasse 9 in Hellenhahn-Schellenberg.
