= Manfred Krafft =

German footballer (1937–2022)

Personal information
- Date of birth: 11 December 1937
- Place of birth: Düsseldorf, Rhine Province, Prussia, Germany
- Date of death: 29 June 2022 (aged 84)
- Place of death: Karlsruhe, Baden-Württemberg, Germany
- Height: 1.79 m (5 ft 10 in)
- Position: Defender

Youth career
- –1959: Fortuna Düsseldorf

Senior career*
Years	Team	Apps	(Gls)
1959–1966	Fortuna Düsseldorf		

Managerial career
- 1966–1967: Fortuna Düsseldorf
- 1967–1970: VfR Neuss
- 1970–1971: SC Union Ohligs
- 1971–1973: VfR Büttgen
- 1973–1976: Fortuna Düsseldorf II
- 1975: Fortuna Düsseldorf (caretaker)
- 1976: Fortuna Düsseldorf
- 1976–1978: 1. FC Saarbrücken
- 1978–1981: Karlsruher SC
- 1982–1983: Darmstadt 98
- 1983–1985: 1. FC Kaiserslautern
- 1986–1987: SG Union Solingen
- 1987–1990: Stuttgarter Kickers
- 1990–1991: 1. FC Pforzheim
- * Club domestic league appearances and goals

Manfred Krafft (11 December 1937 – 29 June 2022) was a German football player and manager.
