= Karl-Heinz Wirth =

German footballer

Kalla Wirth
Personal information
- Full name: Karl-Heinz Wirth
- Date of birth: January 20, 1944 (age 82)
- Height: 1.72 m (5 ft 8 in)
- Position: Defender

Senior career*
Years	Team	Apps	(Gls)
–1965	SF Hamborn 07		
1965–1973	Eintracht Frankfurt	138	(0)
1973–1977	SpVgg Bad Homburg		
1977	FC Paulus Gravenbruch		
- * Club domestic league appearances and goals

Karl-Heinz Wirth (born 20 January 1944) is a German former footballer.

He played for SF Hamborn 07 from 1963 to 1965 and Eintracht Frankfurt from 1965 to 1973. He played 138 times in the Bundesliga.
