= Günter Seibold =

German football player

Personal information
- Date of birth: December 11, 1936
- Date of death: June 20, 2013 (aged 76)
- Height: 1.73 m (5 ft 8 in)
- Position: Defender

Senior career*
Years	Team	Apps	(Gls)
1958–1969	VfB Stuttgart	133	(2)
- * Club domestic league appearances and goals as of 14:38, 27 February 2009 (UTC)

Günter Seibold (December 11, 1936 – June 20, 2013) was a German football player. He spent 6 seasons in the Bundesliga with VfB Stuttgart.

== Honours ==
- DFB-Pokal winner: 1958.
