= Matthias Mauritz =

German footballer (1924–2016)

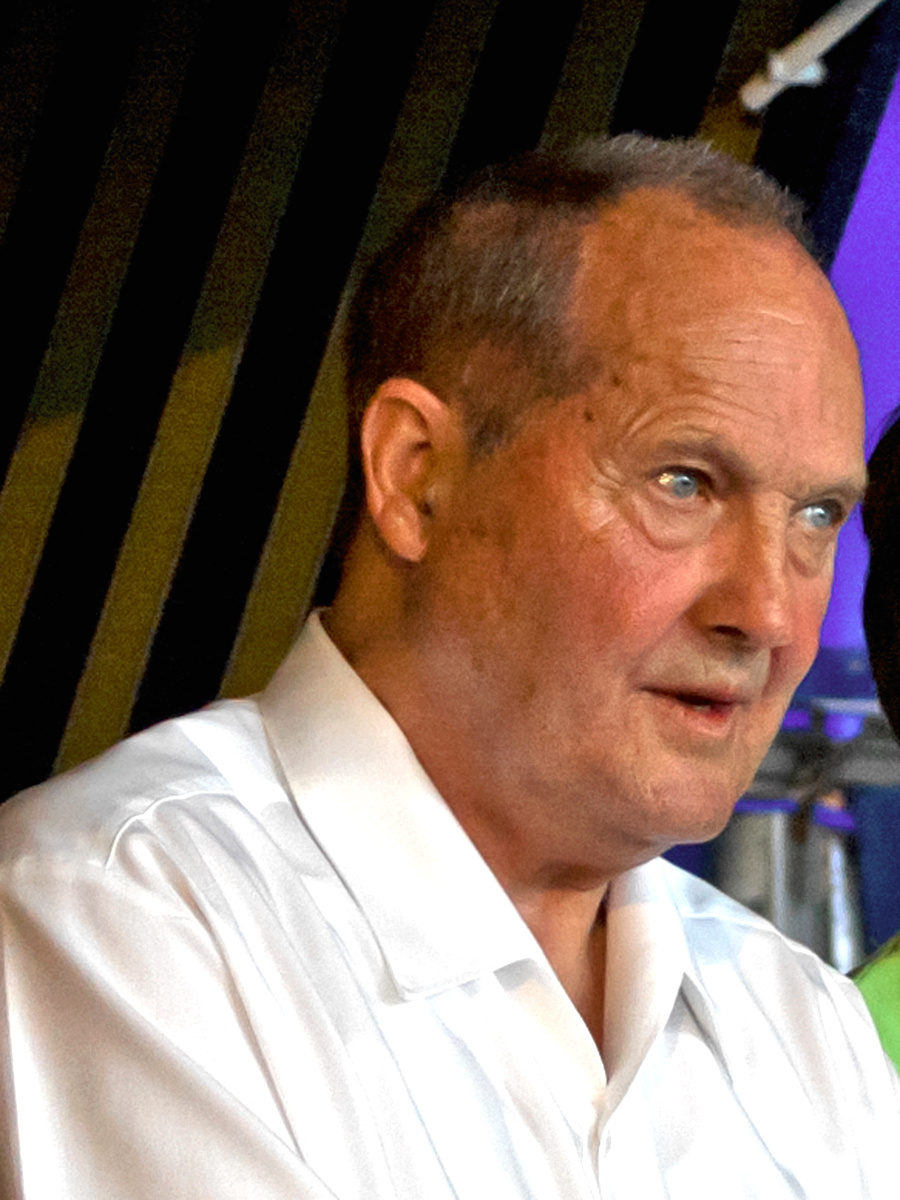
- Mauritz in 2008

Personal information
- Date of birth: 13 November 1924
- Place of birth: Düsseldorf, Germany
- Date of death: 21 November 2016 (aged 92)
- Position: Forward

Senior career*
Years	Team	Apps	(Gls)
1947–1960	Fortuna Düsseldorf		

International career
1959	West Germany	1	(0)
- * Club domestic league appearances and goals

Matthias Mauritz (13 November 1924 – 21 November 2016) was a German international footballer who played for Fortuna Düsseldorf and competed in the 1952 Summer Olympics and in the 1956 Summer Olympics. He was born in Düsseldorf.

== International career ==
Mauritz made his debut for West Germany on 20 May 1959 in a friendly match against Poland, at 34 years of age.
