= Herbert Renner =

German footballer

Personal information
- Date of birth: 28 September 1946 (age 80)
- Place of birth: Fürth, Germany
- Height: 1.80 m (5 ft 11 in)
- Position: Midfielder

Senior career*
Years	Team	Apps	(Gls)
1966–1967	1. FC Nürnberg	0	(0)
1967–1968	St. Gallen		
1968–1969	Strasbourg	14	(3)
1969–1971	1. FC Nürnberg	45	(12)
1971–1975	Mainz 05	115	(55)
1975–1977	FC Bayern Hof	25	(2)
- * Club domestic league appearances and goals

Herbert Renner (born 28 September 1946) is a German former professional footballer who played as a midfielder.
