= Walter Pradt =

German footballer and manager

Personal information
- Date of birth: 12 April 1949
- Place of birth: Wiesbaden, Germany
- Date of death: 24 August 2014 (aged 65)
- Position: Goalkeeper

Youth career
- FC 1934 Wiesbaden-Bierstadt
- Eintracht Frankfurt
- Germania Wiesbaden

Senior career*
Years	Team	Apps	(Gls)
- Germania Wiesbaden
- FC Nürnberg amateur
1968–1971	FC Nürnberg	1	(0)
1971–1973	SpVgg Bayreuth	21	(0)
1973–1985	Waldhof Mannheim	303	(12)

Managerial career
- 1985–1986: Südwest Ludwigshafen
- 1986–1990: Amicitia Viernheim
- 1990–1991: VfR Mannheim
- VfR Grünstadt
- 1995–1996: Waldhof Mannheim
- 2001: VfR Grünstadt
- 2002–2003: Waldhof Mannheim
- 2003–2004: Waldhof Mannheim
- 2006–2007: VfR Mannheim
- 2008–2009: Waldhof Mannheim II
- 2009–2010: Waldhof Mannheim
- * Club domestic league appearances and goals

Walter Pradt (12 April 1949 – 24 August 2014) was a German football player and manager.
