= Dieter Nüssing =

German footballer

Personal information
- Date of birth: 15 August 1949 (age 77)
- Place of birth: Güls, West Germany
- Height: 1.73 m (5 ft 8 in)
- Position: Midfielder

Youth career
- BSC Güls
- FC Germania Metternich

Senior career*
| Years | Team | Apps | (Gls) |
| 1968–1977 | 1. FC Nürnberg | 299 | (95) |
| 1977–1979 | Hertha BSC | 81 | (8) |
| 1980– | La Chaux-de-Fonds | | |
- * Club domestic league appearances and goals

Dieter Nüssing (born 15 August 1949) is a German former professional footballer who played as a midfielder. He spent the majority of his career in the 2. Bundesliga at 1. FC Nürnberg, and is part of the staff at the club as a coach.
