= Gyula Tóth (footballer, born 1941) =

Hungarian footballer

Gyula Toth
Personal information
- Date of birth: 30 April 1941
- Place of birth: Kikinda, Yugoslavia
- Date of death: 1 March 2014 (aged 72)
- Position: Goalkeeper

Senior career*
Years	Team	Apps	(Gls)
1960–1964	SpVgg Fürth	46	(0)
1964–1965	Schalke 04	21	(0)
1965–1968	Nürnberg	12	(0)
1968–1970	Jahn Regensburg	47	(0)
1970–1972	Homburg		
1972–1973	ASV Burglengenfeld		
1974–1975	Jahn Regensburg		

Managerial career
- 1976–1978: Hessen Kassel
- 1979: FV 04 Würzburg
- * Club domestic league appearances and goals

Gyula Toth (30 April 1941 – 1 March 2014) was a Hungarian football coach and player. He spent four seasons in the Bundesliga with FC Schalke 04 and 1. FC Nürnberg. He died as a result of Parkinson's disease.

== Honours ==
1. FC Nürnberg

- Bundesliga: 1967–68
