= Bernhard Steffen (footballer) =

German footballer

Personal information
- Full name: Bernhard Steffen
- Date of birth: 1 June 1937 (age 89)
- Place of birth: Germany
- Position: Forward

Senior career*
Years	Team	Apps	(Gls)
1957–1967	Fortuna Düsseldorf		

International career
1958–1960	West Germany	2	(0)
- * Club domestic league appearances and goals

Bernhard Steffen (born 1 June 1937) is a German former international footballer who played as a forward for Fortuna Düsseldorf.
