= Rolf Geiger =

German footballer (1934–2023)

Personal information
- Date of birth: 16 October 1934
- Place of birth: Marbach am Neckar, Germany
- Date of death: 29 November 2023 (aged 89)
- Position: Forward

Senior career*
| Years | Team | Apps | (Gls) |
- FC Marbach
- FV Salamander Kornwestheim
| 1955–1957 | Stuttgarter Kickers | 35 | (6) |
| 1957–1962 | VfB Stuttgart | 116 | (59) |
| 1962–1963 | Mantova | 24 | (5) |
| 1963–1967 | VfB Stuttgart | 70 | (19) |

International career
| 1956–1964 | West Germany | 8 | (2) |
- * Club domestic league appearances and goals

Rolf Geiger (16 October 1934 – 29 November 2023) was a German professional footballer who played as a forward. He spent four seasons in the Bundesliga with VfB Stuttgart. He represented Germany in eight friendlies. He also played for the United Team of Germany at the 1956 Olympics.

Geiger died on 29 November 2023, at the age of 89.

== Honours ==
VfB Stuttgart

- DFB-Pokal: 1957–58
