= Hubert Schöll =

German footballer

Personal information
- Date of birth: 20 October 1946
- Date of death: 23 November 1992 (aged 46)
- Height: 1.80 m (5 ft 11 in)
- Positions: Midfielder; striker

Senior career*
Years	Team	Apps	(Gls)
1965–1968	1. FC Nürnberg	4	(0)
1968–1970	Hamburger SV	16	(1)
1971–1972	ASV Neumarkt		
1972–1973	Linzer ASK		
1974–1975	KSV Hessen Kassel		
- * Club domestic league appearances and goals

Hubert Schöll (20 October 1946 – 23 November 1992) was a German football player. He spent five seasons in the Bundesliga with 1. FC Nürnberg and Hamburger SV.

== Honours ==
1. FC Nürnberg

- Bundesliga: 1967–68
