= Roland Wabra =

German footballer (1935–1994)

Personal information
- Date of birth: 25 November 1935
- Place of birth: Prague, Czechoslovakia
- Date of death: 17 October 1994 (aged 58)
- Height: 1.78 m (5 ft 10 in)
- Position: Goalkeeper

Senior career*
Years	Team	Apps	(Gls)
- SV Unterreichenbach
1957–1969	1. FC Nürnberg	223	(0)
- * Club domestic league appearances and goals as of 22:05, 17 February 2009 (UTC)

Roland 'Rolli' Wabra (25 November 1935 in Prague – 17 October 1994) was a German football player. He spent six seasons in the Bundesliga with 1. FC Nürnberg.

== Honours ==
1. FC Nürnberg

- Bundesliga: 1967–68
- DFB-Pokal: 1961–62
