= Heinz Müller (footballer, born 1943) =

German footballer

Personal information
- Date of birth: 24 April 1943 (age 83)
- Place of birth: Germany
- Height: 1.74 m (5 ft 9 in)
- Positions: Midfielder; striker

Youth career
- TV 1860 Schweinau

Senior career*
Years	Team	Apps	(Gls)
1966–1972	1. FC Nürnberg	153	(15)
- * Club domestic league appearances and goals

Heinz Müller (born 24 April 1943) is a retired German football player. He spent three seasons in the Bundesliga with 1. FC Nürnberg.

== Honours ==
- Bundesliga: 1967–68
