= Erwin Waldner =

German footballer

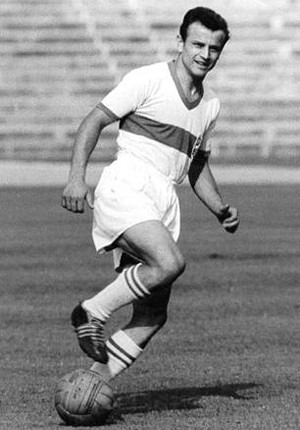

Personal information
- Full name: Erwin Waldner
- Date of birth: 24 January 1933
- Place of birth: Nürtingen, Germany
- Date of death: 18 April 2015 (aged 82)
- Place of death: Nürtingen, Germany
- Position: Forward

Youth career
- 1943–1952: TB Neckarhausen

Senior career*
Years	Team	Apps	(Gls)
1952–1960	VfB Stuttgart	214	(85)
1960–1961	FC Zürich	26	(27)
1961–1963	Real SPAL	18	(2)
1963–1967	VfB Stuttgart	63	(12)
1967–	FV 07 Ebingen		

International career
1954–1958	West Germany	13	(2)
- * Club domestic league appearances and goals

Erwin Waldner (24 January 1933 – 18 April 2015) was a German footballer.

== Club career ==
He was one of not that many West German players in the early 1960s who played his club football abroad. After spells at FC Zürich in Switzerland and Real SPAL in Italy he returned to his former club VfB Stuttgart in 1963 with the introduction of the Bundesliga.

== International career ==
Waldner won 13 caps between December 1954 and December 1958 for the West Germany national team.

== Honours ==
VfB Stuttgart

- DFB-Pokal: 1953–54 and 1957–58
