= 1967–68 Bundesliga =

5th season of the Bundesliga

Bundesliga
- Season: 1967–68
- Dates: 18 August 1967 – 28 May 1968
- Champions: 1. FC Nürnberg; 1st Bundesliga title 9th German title
- Relegated: Borussia Neunkirchen; Karlsruher SC
- European Cup: 1. FC Nürnberg
- Cup Winners' Cup: 1. FC Köln
- Goals: 993
- Average goals/game: 3.25
- Top goalscorer: Hannes Löhr (27)
- Biggest home win: M'gladbach 10–0 Neunkirchen (4 November 1967)
- Biggest away win: M'gladbach 1–6 Schalke (6 January 1968); Neunkirchen 0–5 VfB Stuttgart (18 May 1968)
- Highest scoring: M'gladbach 10–0 Neunkirchen (10 goals) (4 November 1967); M'gladbach 8–2 1. FC Kaiserslautern (10 goals) (9 September 1967); Nürnberg 7–3 FC Bayern (10 goals) (2 December 1967)

The 1967–68 Bundesliga was the fifth season of the Bundesliga, West Germany's premier football league. It began on 18 August 1967 and ended on 28 May 1968. Eintracht Braunschweig were the defending champions.

== Competition modus ==
Every team played two games against each other team, one at home and one away. Teams received two points for a win and one point for a draw. If two or more teams were tied on points, places were determined by goal average. The team with the most points were crowned champions while the two teams with the fewest points were relegated to their respective Regionalliga divisions.

== Team changes to 1967–68 ==
Fortuna Düsseldorf and Rot-Weiss Essen were relegated to the Regionalliga after finishing in the last two places. They were replaced by Alemannia Aachen and Borussia Neunkirchen, who won their respective promotion play-off groups.

== Season overview ==
The 1967–68 season began with an innovation: it was now permissible for teams to substitute out one player per match. Although such a move was only permitted in case of an injury, it was soon used by the coaches for tactical changes as well.

The title was won by 1. FC Nürnberg. The team, led by head coach Max Merkel, consistently collected points and were seven points clear after half the season played. Even a slight collapse near the end of the season could not jeopardize the first Nürnberg Bundesliga title, which also was a record ninth German championship overall for the club.

In European competitions, the European Cup Winners' Cup saw both West German teams advance into the semi-finals. It needed Italian club Milan to prevent a title hat-trick for Bundesliga sides, eliminating title holders Bayern Munich 2–0 on aggregate before beating Hamburger SV, who were the fourth West German team in the final in four consecutive years, at Rotterdam's Feijenoord Stadion by the same score. Hamburg had reached the final by beating Welsh side Cardiff City 4–3 on aggregate. The achievement eased the disappointment on another lackluster season by the club from North Germany, who finished its campaign only in 13th place.

The bottom side of the table saw an early decision in the relegation race. Borussia Neunkirchen and Karlsruher SC were demoted to the Regionalliga with four matchdays to play. Both teams clearly lacked quality players on both sides of the pitch, as they provided the poorest attacks and defences of all clubs.

== Team overview ==
Location of teams in Bundesliga 1967–68

Club	Ground	Capacity
Alemannia Aachen	Tivoli	30,000
Eintracht Braunschweig	Eintracht-Stadion	38,000
Werder Bremen	Weserstadion	32,000
Borussia Dortmund	Stadion Rote Erde	30,000
MSV Duisburg	Wedaustadion	38,500
Eintracht Frankfurt	Waldstadion	87,000
Hamburger SV	Volksparkstadion	80,000
Hannover 96	Niedersachsenstadion	86,000
1. FC Kaiserslautern	Stadion Betzenberg	42,000
Karlsruher SC	Wildparkstadion	50,000
1. FC Köln	Müngersdorfer Stadion	76,000
Borussia Mönchengladbach	Bökelbergstadion	34,500
1860 Munich	Stadion an der Grünwalder Straße	44,300
Bayern Munich	Stadion an der Grünwalder Straße	44,300
Borussia Neunkirchen	Ellenfeld	32,000
1. FC Nürnberg	Städtisches Stadion	64,238
Schalke 04	Glückauf-Kampfbahn	35,000
VfB Stuttgart	Neckarstadion	53,000

== League table ==
Pos	Team	Pld	W	D	L	GF	GA	GR	Pts	Qualification or relegation
1	1. FC Nürnberg (C)	34	19	9	6	71	37	1.919	47	Qualification to European Cup first round
2	Werder Bremen	34	18	8	8	68	51	1.333	44	
3	Borussia Mönchengladbach	34	15	12	7	77	45	1.711	42	
4	1. FC Köln	34	17	4	13	68	52	1.308	38	Qualification to Cup Winners' Cup first round
5	Bayern Munich	34	16	6	12	68	58	1.172	38	
6	Eintracht Frankfurt	34	15	8	11	58	51	1.137	38	Qualification to Inter-Cities Fairs Cup first round
7	MSV Duisburg	34	13	10	11	69	58	1.190	36	
8	VfB Stuttgart	34	14	7	13	65	54	1.204	35	
9	Eintracht Braunschweig	34	15	5	14	37	39	0.949	35	
10	Hannover 96	34	12	10	12	48	52	0.923	34	Qualification to Inter-Cities Fairs Cup first round
11	Alemannia Aachen	34	13	8	13	52	66	0.788	34	
12	1860 Munich	34	11	11	12	55	39	1.410	33	Qualification to Inter-Cities Fairs Cup first round
13	Hamburger SV	34	11	11	12	51	54	0.944	33	Qualification to Inter-Cities Fairs Cup first round
14	Borussia Dortmund	34	12	7	15	60	59	1.017	31	
15	Schalke 04	34	11	8	15	42	48	0.875	30	
16	1. FC Kaiserslautern	34	8	12	14	39	67	0.582	28	
17	Borussia Neunkirchen (R)	34	7	5	22	33	93	0.355	19	Relegation to Regionalliga
18	Karlsruher SC (R)	34	6	5	23	32	70	0.457	17	Relegation to Regionalliga

Source: www.dfb.de
Rules for classification: 1) points; 2) goal ratio.
(C) Champions; (R) Relegated

== Results ==
Home \ Away	AAC	EBS	SVW	BVB	DUI	SGE	HSV	H96	FCK	KSC	KOE	BMG	M60	FCB	BNE	FCN	S04	VFB
Alemannia Aachen	—	2–1	1–1	3–0	4–4	2–1	2–0	2–2	1–1	2–1	4–2	0–0	3–3	0–4	5–1	2–0	2–1	3–2
Eintracht Braunschweig	2–0	—	0–3	2–0	3–0	0–0	0–1	0–1	1–0	1–0	1–2	2–1	0–1	1–0	4–2	0–3	1–0	2–1
Werder Bremen	0–1	3–2	—	2–1	3–3	2–0	1–4	1–0	2–1	6–1	3–1	0–4	2–2	4–1	2–1	0–4	2–0	3–1
Borussia Dortmund	1–0	0–1	1–1	—	4–3	2–1	2–2	3–1	4–0	5–0	2–0	3–1	0–0	6–3	6–0	1–2	2–1	2–1
MSV Duisburg	3–0	2–3	1–1	2–2	—	0–1	1–2	1–2	7–0	2–1	3–2	2–2	2–1	3–3	3–1	2–0	1–1	3–3
Eintracht Frankfurt	1–1	2–0	5–3	4–1	3–2	—	1–1	3–0	5–2	2–0	1–2	3–1	2–1	2–3	4–1	1–2	2–2	4–0
Hamburger SV	5–1	0–0	2–1	3–2	1–3	0–1	—	2–3	1–1	0–0	3–1	2–3	2–2	2–1	0–0	3–1	1–1	1–1
Hannover 96	1–1	1–1	4–2	2–2	2–2	2–1	2–2	—	2–0	2–0	3–0	1–1	1–2	2–1	2–0	1–1	2–1	2–1
1. FC Kaiserslautern	1–0	2–2	2–2	2–2	0–1	1–1	3–3	0–0	—	1–1	2–1	0–1	0–0	2–2	2–1	1–0	1–0	2–0
Karlsruher SC	2–4	1–2	1–2	2–0	0–2	0–1	2–1	3–1	2–2	—	0–1	3–2	0–3	0–2	5–1	1–1	1–0	1–4
1. FC Köln	3–1	1–0	1–4	3–0	3–0	5–1	2–1	2–1	5–0	4–0	—	2–5	1–0	3–3	2–1	3–3	7–0	2–2
Borussia Mönchengladbach	3–0	2–0	3–1	2–2	1–1	1–1	4–1	5–1	8–2	0–0	1–0	—	1–1	1–1	10–0	1–1	1–6	1–1
1860 Munich	6–0	1–0	1–3	3–0	0–1	5–0	0–1	3–1	0–3	3–0	0–1	0–0	—	3–2	5–0	1–2	1–2	3–3
Bayern Munich	4–1	3–0	2–3	2–0	0–4	3–0	1–0	1–0	4–1	3–0	0–3	3–1	2–2	—	4–0	0–2	2–0	3–1
Borussia Neunkirchen	0–1	1–2	0–0	3–2	2–1	2–2	0–3	3–1	2–1	3–2	2–1	0–3	1–0	1–1	—	2–2	1–5	0–5
1. FC Nürnberg	4–1	3–1	0–0	2–1	4–1	0–2	4–0	2–1	4–1	2–0	2–1	1–0	1–1	7–3	3–0	—	2–3	5–1
Schalke 04	2–1	0–2	0–2	1–0	0–3	0–0	3–0	1–1	2–1	2–0	1–1	3–4	0–0	0–1	2–0	0–0	—	2–1
VfB Stuttgart	4–1	0–0	0–3	4–1	3–0	4–0	4–1	2–0	0–1	3–2	2–0	1–3	2–1	3–0	2–1 (Note: The VfB Stuttgart v Borussia Neunkirchen match from 2 December 1967 was suspended after 55 minutes and a score of 0–0 due to poor visibility caused by heavy fog. The replay took place on 16 December 1967 and finished with a score of 2–1.)	1–1	2–0	—

Source: DFB
Legend: Blue = home team win; Yellow = draw; Red = away team win.

== Top goalscorers ==
27 goals

- (Germany) Hannes Löhr (1. FC Köln)

25 goals

- (Germany) Franz Brungs (1. FC Nürnberg)

19 goals

- (Germany) Herbert Laumen (Borussia Mönchengladbach)
- (Germany) Peter Meyer (Borussia Mönchengladbach)
- (Germany) Gerd Müller (Bayern Munich)
- (Germany) Rainer Ohlhauser (Bayern Munich)

18 goals

- (Germany) Lothar Emmerich (Borussia Dortmund)
- (Germany) Heinz Strehl (1. FC Nürnberg)

17 goals

- (Germany) Horst Köppel (VfB Stuttgart)

16 goals

- (Germany) Rainer Budde (MSV Duisburg)
- (Germany) Werner Görts (Werder Bremen)

== Champion squad ==
1. FC Nürnberg
Goalkeepers: Roland Wabra (34); Gyula Tóth (Socialist Federal Republic of Yugoslavia) (1).

Defenders: Horst Leupold (34 / 1); Ferdinand Wenauer (34); Ludwig Müller (33 / 1); Fritz Popp (32); Helmut Hilpert (4).
Midfielders: Karl-Heinz Ferschl (32 / 4); Heinz Müller (29 / 2); August Starek (Austria) (24 / 5).
Forwards: Franz Brungs (34 / 25); Heinz Strehl (33 / 18); Georg Volkert (33 / 9); Zvezdan Čebinac (Socialist Federal Republic of Yugoslavia) (33 / 3); Hubert Schöll (3).
(league appearances and goals listed in brackets)

Manager: Max Merkel (Austria) .

On the roster but have not played in a league game: Adolf Ruff; Ewald Schäffner; Horst Blankenburg; Claus-Jürgen Braun; Manfred Ebenhöh; Wulf-Ingo Usbeck.

== See also ==
- 1967–68 DFB-Pokal
