= Ferdinand Wenauer =

German footballer (1939–1992)

Personal information
- Date of birth: 26 April 1939
- Place of birth: Germany
- Date of death: 27 July 1992 (aged 53)
- Height: 1.86 m (6 ft 1 in)
- Position: Defender

Senior career*
Years	Team	Apps	(Gls)
1958–1972	1. FC Nürnberg	403	(7)

International career
1960–1962	Germany	4	(0)
- * Club domestic league appearances and goals

Ferdinand "Nandl" Wenauer (26 April 1939 – 27 July 1992) was a German football player. He spent six seasons in the Bundesliga with 1. FC Nürnberg. He also represented Germany in four friendlies.

He died of heart failure in 1992.

== Honours ==
1. FC Nürnberg

- Bundesliga: 1960–61, 1967–68
- DFB-Pokal: 1961–62
