= Helmut Hilpert =

German footballer

Personal information
- Date of birth: 20 September 1937
- Place of birth: Germany
- Date of death: 15 June 1997 (aged 59)
- Position: Defender

Senior career*
Years	Team	Apps	(Gls)
1959–1968	1. FC Nürnberg	191	(5)
1968–1969	SV Waldhof Mannheim		
- * Club domestic league appearances and goals

Helmut Hilpert (born 20 September 1937 – 15 June 1997) was a German football player. He spent five seasons in the Bundesliga with 1. FC Nürnberg.

== Honours ==
- German championship: 1960–61
- Bundesliga champion: 1967–68
- DFB-Pokal winner: 1961–62
