= Karl Hoffmann (footballer) =

German footballer (1935–2020)

Personal information
- Date of birth: 10 October 1935
- Place of birth: Düsseldorf, Germany
- Date of death: 16 March 2020 (aged 84)
- Place of death: Langenfeld, Germany
- Position: Midfielder

Senior career*
Years	Team	Apps	(Gls)
1954–1955	VfL 06 Benrath		
1955–1966	Fortuna Düsseldorf		

International career
- West Germany
- * Club domestic league appearances and goals

Karl Hoffmann (10 October 1935 – 16 March 2020) was a German footballer who played as a midfielder. He competed for West Germany in the men's tournament at the 1956 Summer Olympics.
