= Franz-Josef Wolfframm =

German footballer

Personal information
- Date of birth: 22 October 1934
- Place of birth: Krefeld, Germany
- Date of death: 3 July 2015 (aged 80)
- Place of death: Rheinberg, Germany
- Position: Midfielder

Senior career*
Years	Team	Apps	(Gls)
1957–1964	Fortuna Düsseldorf	175	(70)
1964–1966	Bayer Leverkusen		
- * Club domestic league appearances and goals

Franz-Josef Wolfframm (22 October 1934 – 3 July 2015) was a German footballer who played as a midfielder.

== Career ==
Wolfframm played for Fortuna Düsseldorf between 1957 and 1964, scoring 75 goals in 170 league appearances. With the club he was a runner-up in the German Cup final on three occasions. After leaving in 1964 he spent two years with Bayer Leverkusen.

== Later life and death ==
Wolfframm died on 3 July 2015, at the age of 80.
