= Heinz Strehl =

German footballer

Personal information
- Date of birth: 20 July 1938
- Place of birth: Kalchreuth, Germany
- Date of death: 11 August 1986 (aged 48)
- Place of death: Kalchreuth, West Germany
- Height: 1.81 m (5 ft 11 in)
- Position: Forward

Youth career
- TSV Gleißhammer

Senior career*
Years	Team	Apps	(Gls)
1958–1970	1. FC Nürnberg	300	(159)
Total		300	(159)

International career
1962–1965	West Germany	4	(4)
- * Club domestic league appearances and goals

Heinz Strehl (20 July 1938 – 11 August 1986) was a German footballer who played as a forward.

== Career ==
A Bundesliga title-winner with 1. FC Nürnberg in 1968, Heinz Strehl was one of the proven goalscorers in West Germany in the 1960s and able to cap his West Germany debut against Yugoslavia on 30 September 1962, with a hat-trick in between the 23rd and the 62nd minute. An effort that still lists Strehl among the fastest fifteen hat-trick outputs in the West Germany national team's football history. Thanks to Strehl's goals West Germany came out 3–2 winner in Zagreb that day.

Beforehand, Strehl had already been part of Sepp Herberger's squad at the 1962 FIFA World Cup, not making any appearance. He added a fourth goal to his West German tally in spring 1965 against Cyprus (5–0) in a World Cup qualifier that remained his final match for West Germany.

Nominally a centre forward, Strehl's international career was hindered by Uwe Seeler, who played in the same position, which meant that Strehl would only get first team action when Seeler was not available. As a player, he was resilient and great at heading but also technically sound. Often he was used as an inside forward due to his good passing skills and vision. Apart from winning the Bundesliga in 1968, Strehl also won the West German football championship in 1961 and the West German Cup in 1962.

After suffering a meniscus injury in 1970, Strehl retired from professional football. He continued to act as a player manager for FC Schwaig until 1973.

Aged 48, Heinz Strehl died on 11 August 1986, of heart failure.

== Trivia ==
- Strehl's 76 goals in the Bundesliga for 1. FC Nürnberg are still the most goals scored by an individual player of 1. FC Nürnberg in their Bundesliga history.
