= 1961–62 DFB-Pokal =

1961–1962 DFB-Pokal
Tournament details
- Country: West Germany
- Teams: 16

Final positions
- Champions: 1. FC Nürnberg
- Runners-up: Fortuna Düsseldorf

Tournament statistics
- Matches played: 16

The 1961–62 DFB-Pokal was the 19th season of the annual German football cup competition. It began on 28 July 1962 and ended on 29 August 1962. 16 teams competed in the tournament of four rounds. In the final 1. FC Nürnberg defeated Fortuna Düsseldorf 2–1 after extra time.

== Matches ==
=== Round of 16 ===
28 July 1962
| VfV Hildesheim | 3 – 2 | Westfalia Herne |
| Holstein Kiel | 3 – 4 | FC Schalke 04 |
| 1. FSV Mainz 05 | 0 – 5 | 1. FC Köln |
| Fortuna Düsseldorf | 2 – 1 | Sportfreunde Lebenstedt |
| TSV 1860 München | 6 – 1 | KSV Hessen Kassel |
| 1. FC Saarbrücken | 4 – 1 | Eintracht Braunschweig |
| SV Saar 05 Saarbrücken | 0 – 3 | 1. FC Nürnberg |
| Eintracht Frankfurt | 1 – 0 | Tasmania 1900 Berlin |

=== Quarter-finals ===
8 August 1962
| 1. FC Nürnberg | 11 – 0 | VfV Hildesheim |
| 1. FC Saarbrücken | 2 – 2 | Fortuna Düsseldorf | (AET) |
| FC Schalke 04 | 4 – 2 | TSV 1860 München |
| 1. FC Köln | 1 – 2 | Eintracht Frankfurt | (AET) |

==== Replay ====
15 August 1962
| Fortuna Düsseldorf | 2 – 1 | 1. FC Saarbrücken |

=== Semi-finals ===
22 August 1962
| Fortuna Düsseldorf | 3 – 2 | FC Schalke 04 |
24 August 1962
| 1. FC Nürnberg | 4 – 2 | Eintracht Frankfurt |

=== Final ===
29 August 1962
17:00 CET

| 1. FC Nürnberg | 2–1 (a.e.t.) | Fortuna Düsseldorf |
|---|---|---|
| Haseneder 71'; Wild 93' | Report | Wolfframm 58' |

Niedersachsenstadion, Hanover
Attendance: 41,000
Referee: Rolf Seekamp (Bremen)
